= 2023 ATP Challenger Tour =

Secondary professional tennis circuit

Details
- Duration: 1 January – 3 December 2023
- Edition: 46th (15th under this name)
- Tournaments: 196
- Categories: Challenger 175 (5); Challenger 125 (35); Challenger 100 (41); Challenger 75 (98); Challenger 50 (17)

Achievements (singles)
- Most titles: (Argentina) Mariano Navone (5)
- Most finals: (Australia) James Duckworth (Argentina) Mariano Navone (Austria) Sebastian Ofner (Australia) Max Purcell (6)

The Association of Tennis Professionals (ATP) Challenger Tour in 2023 was the secondary professional tennis circuit organized by the ATP. The 2023 ATP Challenger Tour calendar comprised 196 tournaments, with prize money ranging from $40,000 up to $220,000. It was the 46th edition of Challenger tournaments cycle and 15th under the name of Challenger Tour.

== Schedule ==
This was the complete schedule of events on the 2023 calendar with player progression documented from the quarterfinals stage.

=== January ===
| Week of | Tournament | Champions | Runners-up | Semifinalists | Quarterfinalists |
|---|---|---|---|---|---|
| January 2 | Canberra Tennis International; Canberra, Australia; Hard – Challenger 100 – 32S/24Q/16D; Singles – Doubles | (Hungary) Márton Fucsovics; 7–5, 6–4 | (Switzerland) Leandro Riedi | (Japan) Yosuke Watanuki (Germany) Jan-Lennard Struff | (Australia) Marc Polmans (Slovakia) Norbert Gombos (United Kingdom) Liam Broady (France) Enzo Couacaud |
| January 2 | Canberra Tennis International; Canberra, Australia; Hard – Challenger 100 – 32S/24Q/16D; Singles – Doubles | (Sweden) André Göransson (Japan) Ben McLachlan; 6–3, 5–7, [10–5] | (Australia) Andrew Harris (Australia) John-Patrick Smith | (Japan) Yosuke Watanuki (Germany) Jan-Lennard Struff | (Australia) Marc Polmans (Slovakia) Norbert Gombos (United Kingdom) Liam Broady (France) Enzo Couacaud |
| January 2 | Open Nouvelle-Calédonie; Nouméa, New Caledonia; Hard – Challenger 100 – 32S/24Q/16D; Singles – Doubles | (Italy) Raúl Brancaccio; 4–6, 7–5, 6–2 | (France) Laurent Lokoli | (Chile) Cristian Garín (United Kingdom) Ryan Peniston | (Argentina) Facundo Díaz Acosta (France) Benoît Paire (Bosnia and Herzegovina) Damir Džumhur (New Zealand) Rubin Statham |
| January 2 | Open Nouvelle-Calédonie; Nouméa, New Caledonia; Hard – Challenger 100 – 32S/24Q/16D; Singles – Doubles | (Northern Mariana Islands) Colin Sinclair (New Zealand) Rubin Statham; 6–4, 6–3 | (Japan) Toshihide Matsui (Japan) Kaito Uesugi | (Chile) Cristian Garín (United Kingdom) Ryan Peniston | (Argentina) Facundo Díaz Acosta (France) Benoît Paire (Bosnia and Herzegovina) Damir Džumhur (New Zealand) Rubin Statham |
| January 2 | Nonthaburi Challenger; Nonthaburi, Thailand; Hard – Challenger 75 – 32S/24Q/16D; Singles – Doubles | (Austria) Dennis Novak; 6–4, 6–4 | (Chinese Taipei) Wu Tung-lin | (South Africa) Lloyd Harris (France) Antoine Escoffier | (Chinese Taipei) Hsu Yu-hsiou; Evgeny Donskoy (Australia) Max Purcell (Czech Republic) Marek Gengel |
| January 2 | Nonthaburi Challenger; Nonthaburi, Thailand; Hard – Challenger 75 – 32S/24Q/16D; Singles – Doubles | (Czech Republic) Marek Gengel (Czech Republic) Adam Pavlásek; 7–6^{(7–4)}, 6–4 | (United States) Robert Galloway (Mexico) Hans Hach Verdugo | (South Africa) Lloyd Harris (France) Antoine Escoffier | (Chinese Taipei) Hsu Yu-hsiou; Evgeny Donskoy (Australia) Max Purcell (Czech Republic) Marek Gengel |
| January 2 | Oeiras Indoors; Oeiras, Portugal; Hard (i) – Challenger 50 – 32S/24Q/16D; Singles – Doubles | (Belgium) Joris De Loore; 6–3, 6–2 | (Romania) Filip Cristian Jianu | (Turkey) Cem İlkel (Belgium) Raphaël Collignon | (France) Gabriel Debru (Croatia) Dino Prižmić (Austria) Maximilian Neuchrist (Israel) Edan Leshem |
| January 2 | Oeiras Indoors; Oeiras, Portugal; Hard (i) – Challenger 50 – 32S/24Q/16D; Singles – Doubles | (Romania) Victor Vlad Cornea (Czech Republic) Petr Nouza; 6–3, 7–6^{(7–3)} | (France) Jonathan Eysseric (France) Pierre-Hugues Herbert | (Turkey) Cem İlkel (Belgium) Raphaël Collignon | (France) Gabriel Debru (Croatia) Dino Prižmić (Austria) Maximilian Neuchrist (Israel) Edan Leshem |
| January 2 | Challenger de Tigre; Tigre, Argentina; Clay – Challenger 50 – 32S/24Q/16D; Singles – Doubles | (Argentina) Juan Manuel Cerúndolo; 4–6, 6–4, 6–2 | (Bolivia) Murkel Dellien | (Italy) Alessandro Giannessi (Argentina) Gonzalo Villanueva | (Argentina) Guido Andreozzi (Argentina) Lautaro Midón (Argentina) Juan Ignacio Londero (Argentina) Valerio Aboian |
| January 2 | Challenger de Tigre; Tigre, Argentina; Clay – Challenger 50 – 32S/24Q/16D; Singles – Doubles | (Argentina) Guido Andreozzi (Uruguay) Ignacio Carou; 5–7, 6–4, [10–5] | (Argentina) Leonardo Aboian (Argentina) Ignacio Monzón | (Italy) Alessandro Giannessi (Argentina) Gonzalo Villanueva | (Argentina) Guido Andreozzi (Argentina) Lautaro Midón (Argentina) Juan Ignacio Londero (Argentina) Valerio Aboian |
| January 9 | Nonthaburi Challenger II; Nonthaburi, Thailand; Hard – Challenger 75 – 32S/24Q/16D; Singles – Doubles | (France) Arthur Cazaux; 7–6^{(7–5)}, 6–2 | (South Africa) Lloyd Harris | (Austria) Dennis Novak (Chinese Taipei) Jason Jung | (Czech Republic) Marek Gengel (United States) Tennys Sandgren; Evgeny Donskoy (Poland) Daniel Michalski |
| January 9 | Nonthaburi Challenger II; Nonthaburi, Thailand; Hard – Challenger 75 – 32S/24Q/16D; Singles – Doubles | (India) Yuki Bhambri (India) Saketh Myneni; 2–6, 7–6^{(9–7)}, [14–12] | (Indonesia) Christopher Rungkat (Australia) Akira Santillan | (Austria) Dennis Novak (Chinese Taipei) Jason Jung | (Czech Republic) Marek Gengel (United States) Tennys Sandgren; Evgeny Donskoy (Poland) Daniel Michalski |
| January 9 | Oeiras Indoors II; Oeiras, Portugal; Hard (i) – Challenger 75 – 32S/24Q/16D; Singles – Doubles | (France) Arthur Fils; 6–1, 7–6^{(7–4)} | (Belgium) Joris De Loore | (Lithuania) Ričardas Berankis (France) Pierre-Hugues Herbert | (Croatia) Dino Prižmić (Austria) Maximilian Neuchrist (Portugal) Pedro Sousa (Italy) Lorenzo Giustino |
| January 9 | Oeiras Indoors II; Oeiras, Portugal; Hard (i) – Challenger 75 – 32S/24Q/16D; Singles – Doubles | (Netherlands) Sander Arends (Netherlands) David Pel; 6–3, 7–6^{(7–3)} | (Finland) Patrik Niklas-Salminen (Netherlands) Bart Stevens | (Lithuania) Ričardas Berankis (France) Pierre-Hugues Herbert | (Croatia) Dino Prižmić (Austria) Maximilian Neuchrist (Portugal) Pedro Sousa (Italy) Lorenzo Giustino |
| January 9 | Challenger de Tigre II; Tigre, Argentina; Clay – Challenger 50 – 32S/24Q/16D; Singles – Doubles | (Argentina) Juan Manuel Cerúndolo; 6–3, 2–6, 6–2 | (Netherlands) Jesper de Jong | (Italy) Alessandro Giannessi (Argentina) Andrea Collarini | (Argentina) Gonzalo Villanueva (Argentina) Mariano Navone (France) Térence Atmane (Argentina) Juan Bautista Torres |
| January 9 | Challenger de Tigre II; Tigre, Argentina; Clay – Challenger 50 – 32S/24Q/16D; Singles – Doubles | (Brazil) Daniel Dutra da Silva (Ukraine) Oleg Prihodko; 6–2, 6–2 | (South Korea) Chung Yun-seong (United States) Christian Langmo | (Italy) Alessandro Giannessi (Argentina) Andrea Collarini | (Argentina) Gonzalo Villanueva (Argentina) Mariano Navone (France) Térence Atmane (Argentina) Juan Bautista Torres |
| January 16 | Tenerife Challenger; Tenerife, Spain; Hard – Challenger 100 – 32S/24Q/16D; Singles – Doubles | Alexander Shevchenko; 7–5, 6–2 | (Austria) Sebastian Ofner | (Italy) Francesco Maestrelli (Hungary) Máté Valkusz | (Italy) Matteo Gigante (Italy) Lorenzo Giustino (Italy) Riccardo Bonadio (Italy) Francesco Passaro |
| January 16 | Tenerife Challenger; Tenerife, Spain; Hard – Challenger 100 – 32S/24Q/16D; Singles – Doubles | (Romania) Victor Vlad Cornea (Spain) Sergio Martos Gornés; 6–3, 6–4 | (Finland) Patrik Niklas-Salminen (Netherlands) Bart Stevens | (Italy) Francesco Maestrelli (Hungary) Máté Valkusz | (Italy) Matteo Gigante (Italy) Lorenzo Giustino (Italy) Riccardo Bonadio (Italy) Francesco Passaro |
| January 16 | Brasil Tennis Challenger; Piracicaba, Brazil; Clay – Challenger 75 – 32S/24Q/16D; Singles – Doubles | (Argentina) Andrea Collarini; 6–2, 7–6^{(7–1)} | (Chile) Tomás Barrios Vera | (Argentina) Renzo Olivo (Argentina) Camilo Ugo Carabelli | (Chile) Alejandro Tabilo (France) Térence Atmane (Argentina) Hernán Casanova (Brazil) Thiago Seyboth Wild |
| January 16 | Brasil Tennis Challenger; Piracicaba, Brazil; Clay – Challenger 75 – 32S/24Q/16D; Singles – Doubles | (Brazil) Orlando Luz (Brazil) Marcelo Zormann; Walkover | (Argentina) Andrea Collarini (Argentina) Renzo Olivo | (Argentina) Renzo Olivo (Argentina) Camilo Ugo Carabelli | (Chile) Alejandro Tabilo (France) Térence Atmane (Argentina) Hernán Casanova (Brazil) Thiago Seyboth Wild |
| January 16 | Nonthaburi Challenger III; Nonthaburi, Thailand; Hard – Challenger 50 – 32S/24Q/16D; Singles – Doubles | (Japan) Sho Shimabukuro; 6–2, 7–5 | (France) Arthur Cazaux | (South Korea) Hong Seong-chan (Italy) Giovanni Fonio | (Czech Republic) Zdeněk Kolář (Belgium) Michael Geerts (France) Antoine Escoffier (United States) Tennys Sandgren |
| January 16 | Nonthaburi Challenger III; Nonthaburi, Thailand; Hard – Challenger 50 – 32S/24Q/16D; Singles – Doubles | (South Korea) Nam Ji-sung (South Korea) Song Min-kyu; 6–4, 6–4 | (United Kingdom) Jan Choinski (United Kingdom) Stuart Parker | (South Korea) Hong Seong-chan (Italy) Giovanni Fonio | (Czech Republic) Zdeněk Kolář (Belgium) Michael Geerts (France) Antoine Escoffier (United States) Tennys Sandgren |
| January 23 | BW Open; Ottignies-Louvain-la-Neuve, Belgium; Hard (i) – Challenger 125 – 32S/24Q/16D; Singles – Doubles | (Belgium) David Goffin; 6–4, 6–1 | (Sweden) Mikael Ymer | (Belgium) Gauthier Onclin (Turkey) Altuğ Çelikbilek | (Germany) Yannick Hanfmann (Japan) Kaichi Uchida (Austria) Filip Misolic (Hungary) Fábián Marozsán |
| January 23 | BW Open; Ottignies-Louvain-la-Neuve, Belgium; Hard (i) – Challenger 125 – 32S/24Q/16D; Singles – Doubles | (Monaco) Romain Arneodo (Austria) Sam Weissborn; 6–4, 6–3 | (Czech Republic) Roman Jebavý (Czech Republic) Adam Pavlásek | (Belgium) Gauthier Onclin (Turkey) Altuğ Çelikbilek | (Germany) Yannick Hanfmann (Japan) Kaichi Uchida (Austria) Filip Misolic (Hungary) Fábián Marozsán |
| January 23 | Open Quimper Bretagne; Quimper, France; Hard (i) – Challenger 125 – 32S/24Q/16D; Singles – Doubles | (France) Grégoire Barrère; 6–1, 6–4 | (France) Arthur Fils | (France) Calvin Hemery (France) Geoffrey Blancaneaux | (Switzerland) Dominic Stricker (Finland) Otto Virtanen (Moldova) Radu Albot (France) Lucas Pouille |
| January 23 | Open Quimper Bretagne; Quimper, France; Hard (i) – Challenger 125 – 32S/24Q/16D; Singles – Doubles | (France) Sadio Doumbia (France) Fabien Reboul; 6–2, 6–4 | (India) Anirudh Chandrasekar (India) Arjun Kadhe | (France) Calvin Hemery (France) Geoffrey Blancaneaux | (Switzerland) Dominic Stricker (Finland) Otto Virtanen (Moldova) Radu Albot (France) Lucas Pouille |
| January 23 | Challenger Concepción; Concepción, Chile; Clay – Challenger 100 – 32S/24Q/16D; Singles – Doubles | (Argentina) Federico Coria; 6–4, 6–3 | (Kazakhstan) Timofey Skatov | (Bolivia) Hugo Dellien (Argentina) Facundo Díaz Acosta | (Argentina) Federico Delbonis (Argentina) Juan Manuel Cerúndolo (Argentina) Juan Bautista Torres (Chile) Alejandro Tabilo |
| January 23 | Challenger Concepción; Concepción, Chile; Clay – Challenger 100 – 32S/24Q/16D; Singles – Doubles | (Argentina) Guido Andreozzi (Argentina) Guillermo Durán; 7–6^{(7–1)}, 6–7^{(3–7)}, [10–7] | (Italy) Luciano Darderi (Ukraine) Oleg Prihodko | (Bolivia) Hugo Dellien (Argentina) Facundo Díaz Acosta | (Argentina) Federico Delbonis (Argentina) Juan Manuel Cerúndolo (Argentina) Juan Bautista Torres (Chile) Alejandro Tabilo |
| January 30 | Koblenz Open; Koblenz, Germany; Hard (i) – Challenger 100 – 32S/24Q/16D; Singles – Doubles | Roman Safiullin; 6–2, 7–5 | (Canada) Vasek Pospisil | (Czech Republic) Zdeněk Kolář (Belgium) Raphaël Collignon | (France) Alexandre Müller (Germany) Louis Wessels (Germany) Maximilian Marterer; Alexey Vatutin |
| January 30 | Koblenz Open; Koblenz, Germany; Hard (i) – Challenger 100 – 32S/24Q/16D; Singles – Doubles | (Germany) Fabian Fallert (Germany) Hendrik Jebens; 7–6^{(7–2)}, 6–3 | (France) Jonathan Eysseric (Ukraine) Denys Molchanov | (Czech Republic) Zdeněk Kolář (Belgium) Raphaël Collignon | (France) Alexandre Müller (Germany) Louis Wessels (Germany) Maximilian Marterer; Alexey Vatutin |
| January 30 | Burnie International; Burnie, Australia; Hard – Challenger 75 – 32S/24Q/16D; Singles – Doubles | (Australia) Rinky Hijikata; 6–3, 6–3 | (Australia) James Duckworth | (Australia) Marc Polmans (Japan) Yuta Shimizu | (Australia) Philip Sekulic (Australia) Adam Walton (Australia) Thomas Fancutt (Australia) James McCabe |
| January 30 | Burnie International; Burnie, Australia; Hard – Challenger 75 – 32S/24Q/16D; Singles – Doubles | (Australia) Marc Polmans (Australia) Max Purcell; 7–6^{(7–4)}, 6–4 | (Australia) Luke Saville (Australia) Tristan Schoolkate | (Australia) Marc Polmans (Japan) Yuta Shimizu | (Australia) Philip Sekulic (Australia) Adam Walton (Australia) Thomas Fancutt (Australia) James McCabe |
| January 30 | Cleveland Open; Cleveland, United States; Hard (i) – Challenger 75 – 32S/24Q/16D; Singles – Doubles | (United States) Aleksandar Kovacevic; 3–6, 7–5, 7–6^{(7–2)} | (China) Wu Yibing | (Ecuador) Emilio Gómez (United States) Tennys Sandgren | (Canada) Gabriel Diallo (United States) Steve Johnson (United States) Zachary Svajda (United States) Stefan Kozlov |
| January 30 | Cleveland Open; Cleveland, United States; Hard (i) – Challenger 75 – 32S/24Q/16D; Singles – Doubles | (United States) Robert Galloway (Mexico) Hans Hach Verdugo; 3–6, 7–5, [10–6] | (Philippines) Ruben Gonzales (United States) Reese Stalder | (Ecuador) Emilio Gómez (United States) Tennys Sandgren | (Canada) Gabriel Diallo (United States) Steve Johnson (United States) Zachary Svajda (United States) Stefan Kozlov |
| January 30 | Tenerife Challenger II; Tenerife, Spain; Hard – Challenger 75 – 32S/24Q/16D; Singles – Doubles | (Italy) Matteo Arnaldi; 6–1, 6–2 | (Italy) Raúl Brancaccio | (South Africa) Lloyd Harris (Spain) Nicolás Álvarez Varona | (Italy) Roberto Marcora (Spain) Carlos Taberner (Spain) Alejandro Moro Cañas (Ukraine) Oleksii Krutykh |
| January 30 | Tenerife Challenger II; Tenerife, Spain; Hard – Challenger 75 – 32S/24Q/16D; Singles – Doubles | (United States) Christian Harrison (Japan) Shintaro Mochizuki; 6–4, 6–3 | (Italy) Matteo Gigante (Italy) Francesco Passaro | (South Africa) Lloyd Harris (Spain) Nicolás Álvarez Varona | (Italy) Roberto Marcora (Spain) Carlos Taberner (Spain) Alejandro Moro Cañas (Ukraine) Oleksii Krutykh |

=== February ===
| Week of | Tournament | Champions | Runners-up | Semifinalists | Quarterfinalists |
|---|---|---|---|---|---|
| February 6 | Vitas Gerulaitis Cup; Vilnius, Lithuania; Hard (i) – Challenger 100 – 32S/24Q/16D; Singles – Doubles | (United Kingdom) Liam Broady; 6–4, 6–4 | (Czech Republic) Zdeněk Kolář | (Turkey) Cem İlkel (Bosnia and Herzegovina) Damir Džumhur | (Belgium) Joris De Loore (France) Antoine Escoffier (Austria) Dennis Novak (France) Evan Furness |
| February 6 | Vitas Gerulaitis Cup; Vilnius, Lithuania; Hard (i) – Challenger 100 – 32S/24Q/16D; Singles – Doubles | Ivan Liutarevich (Ukraine) Vladyslav Manafov; 6–0, 6–2 | (India) Arjun Kadhe (Germany) Daniel Masur | (Turkey) Cem İlkel (Bosnia and Herzegovina) Damir Džumhur | (Belgium) Joris De Loore (France) Antoine Escoffier (Austria) Dennis Novak (France) Evan Furness |
| February 6 | Tenerife Challenger III; Tenerife, Spain; Hard – Challenger 75 – 32S/24Q/16D; Singles – Doubles | (Italy) Matteo Gigante; 6–3, 6–2 | (Italy) Stefano Travaglia | (Italy) Riccardo Bonadio (United Kingdom) Ryan Peniston | (Spain) Pablo Llamas Ruiz (Italy) Francesco Maestrelli (Italy) Alessandro Giannessi (Italy) Giovanni Fonio |
| February 6 | Tenerife Challenger III; Tenerife, Spain; Hard – Challenger 75 – 32S/24Q/16D; Singles – Doubles | (Australia) Andrew Harris (United States) Christian Harrison; 7–6^{(8–6)}, 6–7^{(4–7)}, [10–8] | (United Kingdom) Luke Johnson (Netherlands) Sem Verbeek | (Italy) Riccardo Bonadio (United Kingdom) Ryan Peniston | (Spain) Pablo Llamas Ruiz (Italy) Francesco Maestrelli (Italy) Alessandro Giannessi (Italy) Giovanni Fonio |
| February 13 | Bahrain Ministry of Interior Tennis Challenger; Manama, Bahrain; Hard – Challenger 125 – 32S/24Q/16D; Singles – Doubles | (Australia) Thanasi Kokkinakis; 6–1, 6–4 | (Jordan) Abdullah Shelbayh | (Italy) Salvatore Caruso (Germany) Jan-Lennard Struff | (Australia) Jason Kubler (Italy) Lorenzo Giustino (Czech Republic) Tomáš Macháč (Australia) Alexei Popyrin |
| February 13 | Bahrain Ministry of Interior Tennis Challenger; Manama, Bahrain; Hard – Challenger 125 – 32S/24Q/16D; Singles – Doubles | (Finland) Patrik Niklas-Salminen (Netherlands) Bart Stevens; 6–3, 6–4 | (Philippines) Ruben Gonzales (Brazil) Fernando Romboli | (Italy) Salvatore Caruso (Germany) Jan-Lennard Struff | (Australia) Jason Kubler (Italy) Lorenzo Giustino (Czech Republic) Tomáš Macháč (Australia) Alexei Popyrin |
| February 13 | Chennai Open Challenger; Chennai, India; Hard – Challenger 100 – 32S/24Q/16D; Singles – Doubles | (Australia) Max Purcell; 5–7, 7–6^{(7–2)}, 6–4 | (United States) Nicolas Moreno de Alboran | (India) Sumit Nagal (Australia) Dane Sweeny | (Japan) Yasutaka Uchiyama (United Kingdom) Jay Clarke (France) Arthur Cazaux (Australia) James Duckworth |
| February 13 | Chennai Open Challenger; Chennai, India; Hard – Challenger 100 – 32S/24Q/16D; Singles – Doubles | (United Kingdom) Jay Clarke (India) Arjun Kadhe; 6–0, 6–4 | (Austria) Sebastian Ofner (Croatia) Nino Serdarušić | (India) Sumit Nagal (Australia) Dane Sweeny | (Japan) Yasutaka Uchiyama (United Kingdom) Jay Clarke (France) Arthur Cazaux (Australia) James Duckworth |
| February 13 | Challenger La Manche; Cherbourg, France; Hard (i) – Challenger 75 – 32S/24Q/16D; Singles – Doubles | (Italy) Giulio Zeppieri; 7–5, 7–6^{(7–4)} | (France) Titouan Droguet | (United Kingdom) Jan Choinski (France) Antoine Escoffier | (Germany) Mats Moraing (France) Gabriel Debru (France) Luca Van Assche; Alexey Vatutin |
| February 13 | Challenger La Manche; Cherbourg, France; Hard (i) – Challenger 75 – 32S/24Q/16D; Singles – Doubles | Ivan Liutarevich (Ukraine) Vladyslav Manafov; 7–6^{(12–10)}, 7–6^{(9–7)} | (Poland) Karol Drzewiecki (Poland) Kacper Żuk | (United Kingdom) Jan Choinski (France) Antoine Escoffier | (Germany) Mats Moraing (France) Gabriel Debru (France) Luca Van Assche; Alexey Vatutin |
| February 20 | Monterrey Challenger; Monterrey, Mexico; Hard – Challenger 125 – 32S/24Q/16D; Singles – Doubles | (Portugal) Nuno Borges; 6–4, 7–6^{(8–6)} | (Croatia) Borna Gojo | (Japan) Yosuke Watanuki (United States) Mitchell Krueger | (United States) Aleksandar Kovacevic (United States) Denis Kudla (Germany) Daniel Altmaier (Australia) Bernard Tomic |
| February 20 | Monterrey Challenger; Monterrey, Mexico; Hard – Challenger 125 – 32S/24Q/16D; Singles – Doubles | (Sweden) André Göransson (Japan) Ben McLachlan; 6–3, 6–4 | (Venezuela) Luis David Martínez (Colombia) Cristian Rodríguez | (Japan) Yosuke Watanuki (United States) Mitchell Krueger | (United States) Aleksandar Kovacevic (United States) Denis Kudla (Germany) Daniel Altmaier (Australia) Bernard Tomic |
| February 20 | Bengaluru Open; Bangalore, India; Hard – Challenger 100 – 32S/24Q/16D; Singles – Doubles | (Australia) Max Purcell; 3–6, 7–5, 7–6^{(7–5)} | (Australia) James Duckworth | (Serbia) Hamad Medjedovic (Australia) James McCabe | (Chinese Taipei) Tseng Chun-hsin (Italy) Luca Nardi (France) Harold Mayot (Bulgaria) Dimitar Kuzmanov |
| February 20 | Bengaluru Open; Bangalore, India; Hard – Challenger 100 – 32S/24Q/16D; Singles – Doubles | (South Korea) Chung Yun-seong (Chinese Taipei) Hsu Yu-hsiou; 3–6, 7–6^{(9–7)}, [11–9] | (India) Anirudh Chandrasekar (India) Vijay Sundar Prashanth | (Serbia) Hamad Medjedovic (Australia) James McCabe | (Chinese Taipei) Tseng Chun-hsin (Italy) Luca Nardi (France) Harold Mayot (Bulgaria) Dimitar Kuzmanov |
| February 20 | Coosa Valley Open; Rome, United States; Hard (i) – Challenger 75 – 32S/24Q/16D; Singles – Doubles | (Australia) Jordan Thompson; 6–4, 6–2 | (United States) Alex Michelsen | (United States) Zachary Svajda (South Korea) Hong Seong-chan | (United Kingdom) Alastair Gray (Germany) Elmar Ejupovic (United States) Toby Kodat (Israel) Edan Leshem |
| February 20 | Coosa Valley Open; Rome, United States; Hard (i) – Challenger 75 – 32S/24Q/16D; Singles – Doubles | (United Kingdom) Luke Johnson (Netherlands) Sem Verbeek; 6–2, 6–2 | (Brazil) Gabriel Décamps (United States) Alex Rybakov | (United States) Zachary Svajda (South Korea) Hong Seong-chan | (United Kingdom) Alastair Gray (Germany) Elmar Ejupovic (United States) Toby Kodat (Israel) Edan Leshem |
| February 20 | Internazionali di Tennis Città di Rovereto; Rovereto, Italy; Hard (i) – Challenger 75 – 32S/24Q/16D; Singles – Doubles | (Switzerland) Dominic Stricker; 7–6^{(10–8)}, 6–2 | (Italy) Giulio Zeppieri | (Japan) Kaichi Uchida (Belgium) Gauthier Onclin | (Austria) Jurij Rodionov (France) Antoine Escoffier (Czech Republic) Zdeněk Kolář (Spain) Alejandro Moro Cañas |
| February 20 | Internazionali di Tennis Città di Rovereto; Rovereto, Italy; Hard (i) – Challenger 75 – 32S/24Q/16D; Singles – Doubles | (Romania) Victor Vlad Cornea (Croatia) Franko Škugor; 6–7^{(3–7)}, 6–2, [10–4] | (Ukraine) Vladyslav Manafov (Ukraine) Oleg Prihodko | (Japan) Kaichi Uchida (Belgium) Gauthier Onclin | (Austria) Jurij Rodionov (France) Antoine Escoffier (Czech Republic) Zdeněk Kolář (Spain) Alejandro Moro Cañas |
| February 27 | Teréga Open Pau–Pyrénées; Pau, France; Hard (i) – Challenger 125 – 32S/24Q/16D; Singles – Doubles | (France) Luca Van Assche; 7–6^{(7–5)}, 4–6, 7–6^{(8–6)} | (France) Ugo Humbert | (France) Arthur Rinderknech (Japan) Kaichi Uchida | (Germany) Jan-Lennard Struff (Austria) Jurij Rodionov (France) Laurent Lokoli (Switzerland) Antoine Bellier |
| February 27 | Teréga Open Pau–Pyrénées; Pau, France; Hard (i) – Challenger 125 – 32S/24Q/16D; Singles – Doubles | (France) Dan Added (France) Albano Olivetti; 3–6, 6–1, [10–8] | (United Kingdom) Julian Cash (Germany) Constantin Frantzen | (France) Arthur Rinderknech (Japan) Kaichi Uchida | (Germany) Jan-Lennard Struff (Austria) Jurij Rodionov (France) Laurent Lokoli (Switzerland) Antoine Bellier |
| February 27 | Pune Challenger; Pune, India; Hard – Challenger 100 – 32S/24Q/16D; Singles – Doubles | (Australia) Max Purcell; 6–2, 6–3 | (Italy) Luca Nardi | (Serbia) Miljan Zekić (Czech Republic) Dominik Palán | (France) Harold Mayot (Italy) Francesco Maestrelli (Japan) Rio Noguchi (Chinese Taipei) Tseng Chun-hsin |
| February 27 | Pune Challenger; Pune, India; Hard – Challenger 100 – 32S/24Q/16D; Singles – Doubles | (India) Anirudh Chandrasekar (India) Vijay Sundar Prashanth; 6–1, 4–6, [10–3] | (Japan) Toshihide Matsui (Japan) Kaito Uesugi | (Serbia) Miljan Zekić (Czech Republic) Dominik Palán | (France) Harold Mayot (Italy) Francesco Maestrelli (Japan) Rio Noguchi (Chinese Taipei) Tseng Chun-hsin |
| February 27 | Texas Tennis Classic; Waco, United States; Hard – Challenger 75 – 32S/24Q/16D; Singles – Doubles | (United States) Aleksandar Kovacevic; 6–3, 4–6, 6–2 | (France) Alexandre Müller | (United States) Alex Michelsen (Croatia) Borna Gojo | (Australia) Aleksandar Vukic (South Korea) Hong Seong-chan (Portugal) Gastão Elias (Japan) Shintaro Mochizuki |
| February 27 | Texas Tennis Classic; Waco, United States; Hard – Challenger 75 – 32S/24Q/16D; Singles – Doubles | (Serbia) Ivan Sabanov (Serbia) Matej Sabanov; 6–1, 3–6, [12–10] | (United States) Evan King (United States) Mitchell Krueger | (United States) Alex Michelsen (Croatia) Borna Gojo | (Australia) Aleksandar Vukic (South Korea) Hong Seong-chan (Portugal) Gastão Elias (Japan) Shintaro Mochizuki |

=== March ===
| Week of | Tournament | Champions | Runners-up | Semifinalists | Quarterfinalists |
|---|---|---|---|---|---|
| March 6 | Puerto Vallarta Open; Puerto Vallarta, Mexico; Hard – Challenger 100 – 32S/24Q/16D; Singles – Doubles | (France) Benoît Paire; 3–6, 6–0, 6–2 | (Japan) Yuta Shimizu | (Australia) James McCabe (Ukraine) Illya Marchenko | (Germany) Daniel Altmaier (United States) Ulises Blanch (Portugal) Gastão Elias (Tunisia) Aziz Dougaz |
| March 6 | Puerto Vallarta Open; Puerto Vallarta, Mexico; Hard – Challenger 100 – 32S/24Q/16D; Singles – Doubles | (United States) Robert Galloway (Mexico) Miguel Ángel Reyes-Varela; 3–0 ret. | (Sweden) André Göransson (Japan) Ben McLachlan | (Australia) James McCabe (Ukraine) Illya Marchenko | (Germany) Daniel Altmaier (United States) Ulises Blanch (Portugal) Gastão Elias (Tunisia) Aziz Dougaz |
| March 6 | Antalya Challenger; Antalya, Turkey; Clay – Challenger 75 – 32S/24Q/16D; Singles – Doubles | (Hungary) Fábián Marozsán; 7–5, 6–0 | (Austria) Sebastian Ofner | (Italy) Gianluca Mager (Czech Republic) Vít Kopřiva | (Belgium) Kimmer Coppejans (Bosnia and Herzegovina) Nerman Fatić (Belgium) Michael Geerts (Poland) Daniel Michalski |
| March 6 | Antalya Challenger; Antalya, Turkey; Clay – Challenger 75 – 32S/24Q/16D; Singles – Doubles | (Sweden) Filip Bergevi (Greece) Petros Tsitsipas; 6–2, 6–4 | (Turkey) Sarp Ağabigün (Turkey) Ergi Kırkın | (Italy) Gianluca Mager (Czech Republic) Vít Kopřiva | (Belgium) Kimmer Coppejans (Bosnia and Herzegovina) Nerman Fatić (Belgium) Michael Geerts (Poland) Daniel Michalski |
| March 6 | Challenger Città di Lugano; Lugano, Switzerland; Hard (i) – Challenger 75 – 32S/24Q/16D; Singles – Doubles | (Finland) Otto Virtanen; 6–4, 7–6^{(7–5)} | (Turkey) Cem İlkel | (France) Antoine Escoffier (Switzerland) Dominic Stricker | (Ukraine) Vitaliy Sachko (Switzerland) Mika Brunold (Lithuania) Ričardas Berankis (United Kingdom) Liam Broady |
| March 6 | Challenger Città di Lugano; Lugano, Switzerland; Hard (i) – Challenger 75 – 32S/24Q/16D; Singles – Doubles | (Belgium) Zizou Bergs (Netherlands) David Pel; 6–2, 7–6^{(8–6)} | (Germany) Constantin Frantzen (Germany) Hendrik Jebens | (France) Antoine Escoffier (Switzerland) Dominic Stricker | (Ukraine) Vitaliy Sachko (Switzerland) Mika Brunold (Lithuania) Ričardas Berankis (United Kingdom) Liam Broady |
| March 6 | Challenger de Santiago; Santiago, Chile; Clay – Challenger 75 – 32S/24Q/16D; Singles – Doubles | (Bolivia) Hugo Dellien; 3–6, 6–3, 6–3 | (Brazil) Thiago Seyboth Wild | (Argentina) Facundo Díaz Acosta (Argentina) Genaro Alberto Olivieri | (Italy) Luciano Darderi (Argentina) Facundo Bagnis (Italy) Franco Agamenone (Italy) Federico Gaio |
| March 6 | Challenger de Santiago; Santiago, Chile; Clay – Challenger 75 – 32S/24Q/16D; Singles – Doubles | (Brazil) Pedro Boscardin Dias (Brazil) João Lucas Reis da Silva; 6–4, 3–6, [10–7] | (Ecuador) Diego Hidalgo (Colombia) Cristian Rodríguez | (Argentina) Facundo Díaz Acosta (Argentina) Genaro Alberto Olivieri | (Italy) Luciano Darderi (Argentina) Facundo Bagnis (Italy) Franco Agamenone (Italy) Federico Gaio |
| March 13 | Arizona Tennis Classic; Phoenix, United States; Hard – Challenger 175 – 32S/24Q/16D; Singles – Doubles | (Portugal) Nuno Borges; 4–6, 6–2, 6–1 | Alexander Shevchenko | (France) Quentin Halys (Germany) Jan-Lennard Struff | (Italy) Matteo Berrettini (United States) Aleksandar Kovacevic (Kazakhstan) Alexander Bublik (Australia) Alexei Popyrin |
| March 13 | Arizona Tennis Classic; Phoenix, United States; Hard – Challenger 175 – 32S/24Q/16D; Singles – Doubles | (United States) Nathaniel Lammons (United States) Jackson Withrow; 6–7^{(1–7)}, 6–4, [10–8] | (Monaco) Hugo Nys (Poland) Jan Zieliński | (France) Quentin Halys (Germany) Jan-Lennard Struff | (Italy) Matteo Berrettini (United States) Aleksandar Kovacevic (Kazakhstan) Alexander Bublik (Australia) Alexei Popyrin |
| March 13 | Viña Challenger; Viña del Mar, Chile; Clay – Challenger 75 – 32S/24Q/16D; Singles – Doubles | (Brazil) Thiago Seyboth Wild; 7–5, 6–1 | (France) Hugo Gaston | (Chile) Tomás Barrios Vera (Italy) Andrea Vavassori | (Italy) Andrea Pellegrino (Spain) Álvaro López San Martín (Argentina) Camilo Ugo Carabelli (Italy) Riccardo Bonadio |
| March 13 | Viña Challenger; Viña del Mar, Chile; Clay – Challenger 75 – 32S/24Q/16D; Singles – Doubles | (Ecuador) Diego Hidalgo (Colombia) Cristian Rodríguez; 6–4, 7–6^{(7–5)} | (Italy) Luciano Darderi (Italy) Andrea Vavassori | (Chile) Tomás Barrios Vera (Italy) Andrea Vavassori | (Italy) Andrea Pellegrino (Spain) Álvaro López San Martín (Argentina) Camilo Ugo Carabelli (Italy) Riccardo Bonadio |
| March 13 | Kiskút Open; Székesfehérvár, Hungary; Clay (i) – Challenger 50 – 32S/24Q/16D; Singles – Doubles | (Serbia) Hamad Medjedovic; 6–4, 6–3 | (Croatia) Nino Serdarušić | (Hungary) Fábián Marozsán (France) Evan Furness | (Bulgaria) Adrian Andreev (Bosnia and Herzegovina) Damir Džumhur (Hungary) Zsombor Piros (Italy) Flavio Cobolli |
| March 13 | Kiskút Open; Székesfehérvár, Hungary; Clay (i) – Challenger 50 – 32S/24Q/16D; Singles – Doubles | Bogdan Bobrov (Uzbekistan) Sergey Fomin; 6–2, 5–7, [11–9] | (Turkey) Sarp Ağabigün (Turkey) Ergi Kırkın | (Hungary) Fábián Marozsán (France) Evan Furness | (Bulgaria) Adrian Andreev (Bosnia and Herzegovina) Damir Džumhur (Hungary) Zsombor Piros (Italy) Flavio Cobolli |
| March 20 | Challenger Biel/Bienne; Biel/Bienne, Switzerland; Hard (i) – Challenger 100 – 32S/24Q/16D; Singles – Doubles | (Austria) Jurij Rodionov; 6–3, 0–0 ret. | (United Kingdom) Liam Broady | (Romania) Marius Copil (Lebanon) Benjamin Hassan | (Switzerland) Mika Brunold (Canada) Gabriel Diallo (Slovakia) Norbert Gombos (Finland) Otto Virtanen |
| March 20 | Challenger Biel/Bienne; Biel/Bienne, Switzerland; Hard (i) – Challenger 100 – 32S/24Q/16D; Singles – Doubles | (Germany) Constantin Frantzen (Germany) Hendrik Jebens; 6–2, 6–4 | (Romania) Victor Vlad Cornea (Croatia) Franko Škugor | (Romania) Marius Copil (Lebanon) Benjamin Hassan | (Switzerland) Mika Brunold (Canada) Gabriel Diallo (Slovakia) Norbert Gombos (Finland) Otto Virtanen |
| March 20 | Challenger Club Els Gorchs; Les Franqueses del Vallès, Spain; Hard – Challenger 75 – 32S/24Q/16D; Singles – Doubles | (France) Hugo Grenier; 3–6, 6–1, 7–6^{(7–3)} | (United Kingdom) Billy Harris | (Australia) Max Purcell (China) Bu Yunchaokete | (Spain) David Jordà Sanchis (Argentina) Marco Trungelliti (Portugal) Gastão Elias; Ivan Gakhov |
| March 20 | Challenger Club Els Gorchs; Les Franqueses del Vallès, Spain; Hard – Challenger 75 – 32S/24Q/16D; Singles – Doubles | (India) Anirudh Chandrasekar (India) Vijay Sundar Prashanth; 7–5, 6–1 | (India) Purav Raja (India) Divij Sharan | (Australia) Max Purcell (China) Bu Yunchaokete | (Spain) David Jordà Sanchis (Argentina) Marco Trungelliti (Portugal) Gastão Elias; Ivan Gakhov |
| March 20 | Open Saint-Brieuc; Saint-Brieuc, France; Hard (i) – Challenger 75 – 32S/24Q/16D; Singles – Doubles | (Lithuania) Ričardas Berankis; 6–3, 6–7^{(3–7)}, 7–6^{(7–5)} | (France) Dan Added | (France) Evan Furness (France) Pierre-Hugues Herbert | (France) Antoine Escoffier (France) Harold Mayot (France) Lucas Poullain (Estonia) Mark Lajal |
| March 20 | Open Saint-Brieuc; Saint-Brieuc, France; Hard (i) – Challenger 75 – 32S/24Q/16D; Singles – Doubles | (France) Dan Added (France) Albano Olivetti; 4–6, 7–6^{(9–7)}, [10–6] | (Finland) Patrik Niklas-Salminen (Netherlands) Bart Stevens | (France) Evan Furness (France) Pierre-Hugues Herbert | (France) Antoine Escoffier (France) Harold Mayot (France) Lucas Poullain (Estonia) Mark Lajal |
| March 20 | Zadar Open; Zadar, Croatia; Clay – Challenger 75 – 32S/24Q/16D; Singles – Doubles | (Italy) Alessandro Giannessi; 6–4, 5–7, 7–6^{(8–6)} | (Austria) Sebastian Ofner | (Italy) Flavio Cobolli (France) Arthur Cazaux | (Italy) Giulio Zeppieri (Italy) Matteo Gigante (Hungary) Zsombor Piros (Croatia) Dino Prižmić |
| March 20 | Zadar Open; Zadar, Croatia; Clay – Challenger 75 – 32S/24Q/16D; Singles – Doubles | (France) Manuel Guinard (Croatia) Nino Serdarušić; 6–4, 6–0 | (Serbia) Ivan Sabanov (Serbia) Matej Sabanov | (Italy) Flavio Cobolli (France) Arthur Cazaux | (Italy) Giulio Zeppieri (Italy) Matteo Gigante (Hungary) Zsombor Piros (Croatia) Dino Prižmić |
| March 27 | Mexico City Open; Mexico City, Mexico; Clay – Challenger 125 – 32S/24Q/16D; Singles – Doubles | (Germany) Dominik Koepfer; 2–6, 6–4, 6–2 | (Argentina) Thiago Agustín Tirante | (Austria) Maximilian Neuchrist (United Kingdom) Jan Choinski | (Italy) Federico Gaio (Switzerland) Antoine Bellier (Colombia) Nicolás Mejía (France) Enzo Couacaud |
| March 27 | Mexico City Open; Mexico City, Mexico; Clay – Challenger 125 – 32S/24Q/16D; Singles – Doubles | (Bolivia) Boris Arias (Bolivia) Federico Zeballos; 7–5, 5–7, [10–2] | (United States) Evan King (United States) Reese Stalder | (Austria) Maximilian Neuchrist (United Kingdom) Jan Choinski | (Italy) Federico Gaio (Switzerland) Antoine Bellier (Colombia) Nicolás Mejía (France) Enzo Couacaud |
| March 27 | Sanremo Challenger; Sanremo, Italy; Clay – Challenger 125 – 32S/24Q/16D; Singles – Doubles | (France) Luca Van Assche; 6–1, 6–3 | (Peru) Juan Pablo Varillas | (Belgium) Kimmer Coppejans (Czech Republic) Vít Kopřiva | (Italy) Andrea Vavassori (Hungary) Zsombor Piros (France) Alexandre Müller (Italy) Gianluca Mager |
| March 27 | Sanremo Challenger; Sanremo, Italy; Clay – Challenger 125 – 32S/24Q/16D; Singles – Doubles | (Romania) Victor Vlad Cornea (Croatia) Franko Škugor; 6–2, 6–3 | (Serbia) Nikola Ćaćić (Brazil) Marcelo Demoliner | (Belgium) Kimmer Coppejans (Czech Republic) Vít Kopřiva | (Italy) Andrea Vavassori (Hungary) Zsombor Piros (France) Alexandre Müller (Italy) Gianluca Mager |
| March 27 | Play In Challenger; Lille, France; Hard (i) – Challenger 100 – 32S/24Q/16D; Singles – Doubles | (Finland) Otto Virtanen; 6–7^{(3–7)}, 6–4, 6–2 | (Australia) Max Purcell | (Belgium) Michael Geerts (Austria) Jurij Rodionov | (France) Maxime Janvier (Turkey) Altuğ Çelikbilek (Ukraine) Vitaliy Sachko (Canada) Gabriel Diallo |
| March 27 | Play In Challenger; Lille, France; Hard (i) – Challenger 100 – 32S/24Q/16D; Singles – Doubles | (Australia) Max Purcell (Australia) Jason Taylor; 7–6^{(7–3)}, 6–4 | (Jamaica) Dustin Brown (Pakistan) Aisam-ul-Haq Qureshi | (Belgium) Michael Geerts (Austria) Jurij Rodionov | (France) Maxime Janvier (Turkey) Altuğ Çelikbilek (Ukraine) Vitaliy Sachko (Canada) Gabriel Diallo |
| March 27 | Girona Challenger; Girona, Spain; Clay – Challenger 75 – 32S/24Q/16D; Singles – Doubles | Ivan Gakhov; 5–7, 6–4, 0–0 ret. | (Portugal) Gastão Elias | (Netherlands) Jesper de Jong (Spain) Pedro Martínez | (Argentina) Pedro Cachin (Kazakhstan) Timofey Skatov (Argentina) Mariano Navone (Spain) Jaume Munar |
| March 27 | Girona Challenger; Girona, Spain; Clay – Challenger 75 – 32S/24Q/16D; Singles – Doubles | (India) Yuki Bhambri (India) Saketh Myneni; 6–4, 6–4 | (Spain) Íñigo Cervantes (Spain) Oriol Roca Batalla | (Netherlands) Jesper de Jong (Spain) Pedro Martínez | (Argentina) Pedro Cachin (Kazakhstan) Timofey Skatov (Argentina) Mariano Navone (Spain) Jaume Munar |

=== April ===
| Week of | Tournament | Champions | Runners-up | Semifinalists | Quarterfinalists |
|---|---|---|---|---|---|
| April 3 | Open Città della Disfida; Barletta, Italy; Clay – Challenger 75 – 32S/24Q/16D; Singles – Doubles | (Japan) Shintaro Mochizuki; 6–1, 6–4 | (Argentina) Santiago Rodríguez Taverna | (Italy) Franco Agamenone (Romania) Nicholas David Ionel | (Hungary) Zsombor Piros (France) Laurent Lokoli (Italy) Andrea Pellegrino (Canada) Steven Diez |
| April 3 | Open Città della Disfida; Barletta, Italy; Clay – Challenger 75 – 32S/24Q/16D; Singles – Doubles | (Italy) Jacopo Berrettini (Italy) Flavio Cobolli; 1–6, 7–5, [10–6] | (Czech Republic) Zdeněk Kolář (Ukraine) Denys Molchanov | (Italy) Franco Agamenone (Romania) Nicholas David Ionel | (Hungary) Zsombor Piros (France) Laurent Lokoli (Italy) Andrea Pellegrino (Canada) Steven Diez |
| April 3 | Murcia Open; Murcia, Spain; Clay – Challenger 75 – 32S/24Q/16D; Singles – Doubles | (Italy) Matteo Arnaldi; 6–4, 7–6^{(7–4)} | (Croatia) Borna Gojo | (Spain) Pablo Llamas Ruiz (Argentina) Marco Trungelliti | (Netherlands) Jesper de Jong (Brazil) Daniel Dutra da Silva (Norway) Viktor Durasovic (Kazakhstan) Mikhail Kukushkin |
| April 3 | Murcia Open; Murcia, Spain; Clay – Challenger 75 – 32S/24Q/16D; Singles – Doubles | (Spain) Daniel Rincón (Jordan) Abdullah Shelbayh; 7–6^{(7–3)}, 6–4 | (Italy) Marco Bortolotti (Spain) Sergio Martos Gornés | (Spain) Pablo Llamas Ruiz (Argentina) Marco Trungelliti | (Netherlands) Jesper de Jong (Brazil) Daniel Dutra da Silva (Norway) Viktor Durasovic (Kazakhstan) Mikhail Kukushkin |
| April 3 | San Luis Open Challenger; San Luis Potosí, Mexico; Clay – Challenger 75 – 32S/24Q/16D; Singles – Doubles | (Chile) Tomás Barrios Vera; 7–6^{(8–6)}, 7–5 | (Germany) Dominik Koepfer | (United Kingdom) Jan Choinski (United States) Patrick Kypson | (Argentina) Thiago Agustín Tirante (Austria) Maximilian Neuchrist (France) Giovanni Mpetshi Perricard (France) Térence Atmane |
| April 3 | San Luis Open Challenger; San Luis Potosí, Mexico; Clay – Challenger 75 – 32S/24Q/16D; Singles – Doubles | (Northern Mariana Islands) Colin Sinclair (Australia) Adam Walton; 5–7, 6–3, [10–5] | (Zimbabwe) Benjamin Lock (New Zealand) Rubin Statham | (United Kingdom) Jan Choinski (United States) Patrick Kypson | (Argentina) Thiago Agustín Tirante (Austria) Maximilian Neuchrist (France) Giovanni Mpetshi Perricard (France) Térence Atmane |
| April 10 | Sarasota Open; Sarasota, United States; Clay – Challenger 125 – 32S/24Q/16D; Singles – Doubles | (Germany) Daniel Altmaier; 7–6^{(7–1)}, 6–1 | (Colombia) Daniel Elahi Galán | (Czech Republic) Tomáš Macháč (France) Enzo Couacaud | (Australia) Jason Kubler (Australia) Aleksandar Vukic (Canada) Gabriel Diallo (Argentina) Genaro Alberto Olivieri |
| April 10 | Sarasota Open; Sarasota, United States; Clay – Challenger 125 – 32S/24Q/16D; Singles – Doubles | (United Kingdom) Julian Cash (United Kingdom) Henry Patten; 7–6^{(7–4)}, 6–4 | (Argentina) Guido Andreozzi (Argentina) Guillermo Durán | (Czech Republic) Tomáš Macháč (France) Enzo Couacaud | (Australia) Jason Kubler (Australia) Aleksandar Vukic (Canada) Gabriel Diallo (Argentina) Genaro Alberto Olivieri |
| April 10 | Open Comunidad de Madrid; Madrid, Spain; Clay – Challenger 75 – 32S/24Q/16D; Singles – Doubles | Alexander Shevchenko; 6–4, 6–3 | (Argentina) Pedro Cachin | (Argentina) Andrea Collarini (Italy) Francesco Passaro | (Austria) Sebastian Ofner (Serbia) Miljan Zekić (United States) Nicolas Moreno de Alboran (Spain) Sergi Pérez Contri |
| April 10 | Open Comunidad de Madrid; Madrid, Spain; Clay – Challenger 75 – 32S/24Q/16D; Singles – Doubles | Ivan Liutarevich (Ukraine) Vladyslav Manafov; 6–4, 6–4 | (Finland) Patrik Niklas-Salminen (Netherlands) Bart Stevens | (Argentina) Andrea Collarini (Italy) Francesco Passaro | (Austria) Sebastian Ofner (Serbia) Miljan Zekić (United States) Nicolas Moreno de Alboran (Spain) Sergi Pérez Contri |
| April 10 | León Open; León, Mexico; Hard – Challenger 75 – 32S/24Q/16D; Singles – Doubles | (France) Giovanni Mpetshi Perricard; 6–7^{(5–7)}, 7–6^{(8–6)}, 7–6^{(7–3)} | (Argentina) Juan Pablo Ficovich | (Tunisia) Aziz Dougaz (Austria) Maximilian Neuchrist | (Australia) James Duckworth (Colombia) Nicolás Mejía (Switzerland) Antoine Bellier (Germany) Elmar Ejupovic |
| April 10 | León Open; León, Mexico; Hard – Challenger 75 – 32S/24Q/16D; Singles – Doubles | (Tunisia) Aziz Dougaz (France) Antoine Escoffier; 7–6^{(7–5)}, 3–6, [10–5] | (Austria) Maximilian Neuchrist (Greece) Michail Pervolarakis | (Tunisia) Aziz Dougaz (Austria) Maximilian Neuchrist | (Australia) James Duckworth (Colombia) Nicolás Mejía (Switzerland) Antoine Bellier (Germany) Elmar Ejupovic |
| April 10 | Split Open; Split, Croatia; Clay – Challenger 75 – 32S/24Q/16D; Singles – Doubles | (Hungary) Zsombor Piros; 7–6^{(7–2)}, 7–6^{(11–9)} | (Slovakia) Norbert Gombos | (Australia) Christopher O'Connell (Australia) Marc Polmans | (Croatia) Dino Prižmić (Moldova) Radu Albot (Hungary) Máté Valkusz (Austria) Filip Misolic |
| April 10 | Split Open; Split, Croatia; Clay – Challenger 75 – 32S/24Q/16D; Singles – Doubles | (France) Sadio Doumbia (France) Fabien Reboul; 6–4, 6–4 | (India) Anirudh Chandrasekar (India) Vijay Sundar Prashanth | (Australia) Christopher O'Connell (Australia) Marc Polmans | (Croatia) Dino Prižmić (Moldova) Radu Albot (Hungary) Máté Valkusz (Austria) Filip Misolic |
| April 17 | Open de Oeiras; Oeiras, Portugal; Clay – Challenger 125 – 32S/24Q/16D; Singles – Doubles | (Hungary) Zsombor Piros; 6–3, 6–4 | (Argentina) Juan Manuel Cerúndolo | (Austria) Sebastian Ofner (Portugal) Pedro Sousa | (Belgium) Kimmer Coppejans (Italy) Andrea Vavassori (Japan) Kaichi Uchida (Canada) Steven Diez |
| April 17 | Open de Oeiras; Oeiras, Portugal; Clay – Challenger 125 – 32S/24Q/16D; Singles – Doubles | (Romania) Victor Vlad Cornea (Croatia) Franko Škugor; 7–6^{(7–2)}, 7–6^{(7–4)} | (Brazil) Marcelo Demoliner (Italy) Andrea Vavassori | (Austria) Sebastian Ofner (Portugal) Pedro Sousa | (Belgium) Kimmer Coppejans (Italy) Andrea Vavassori (Japan) Kaichi Uchida (Canada) Steven Diez |
| April 17 | Florianópolis Challenger; Florianópolis, Brazil; Clay – Challenger 75 – 32S/24Q/16D; Singles – Doubles | (Chile) Tomás Barrios Vera; 6–4, 6–4 | (Chile) Alejandro Tabilo | (Brazil) Eduardo Ribeiro (Lebanon) Benjamin Hassan | (Argentina) Genaro Alberto Olivieri (Brazil) João Fonseca (Italy) Alessandro Giannessi (Argentina) Francisco Comesaña |
| April 17 | Florianópolis Challenger; Florianópolis, Brazil; Clay – Challenger 75 – 32S/24Q/16D; Singles – Doubles | (Brazil) Pedro Boscardin Dias (Brazil) Gustavo Heide; 6–2, 7–5 | (Brazil) Christian Oliveira (Brazil) Pedro Sakamoto | (Brazil) Eduardo Ribeiro (Lebanon) Benjamin Hassan | (Argentina) Genaro Alberto Olivieri (Brazil) João Fonseca (Italy) Alessandro Giannessi (Argentina) Francisco Comesaña |
| April 17 | Morelos Open; Cuernavaca, Mexico; Hard – Challenger 75 – 32S/24Q/16D; Singles – Doubles | (Argentina) Thiago Agustín Tirante; 7–5, 6–0 | (Australia) James Duckworth | (United States) Christian Langmo (Estonia) Mark Lajal | (Ukraine) Vitaliy Sachko (France) Antoine Escoffier (Argentina) Juan Pablo Ficovich (France) Térence Atmane |
| April 17 | Morelos Open; Cuernavaca, Mexico; Hard – Challenger 75 – 32S/24Q/16D; Singles – Doubles | (Tunisia) Skander Mansouri (Greece) Michail Pervolarakis; 6–4, 6–4 | (Zimbabwe) Benjamin Lock (New Zealand) Rubin Statham | (United States) Christian Langmo (Estonia) Mark Lajal | (Ukraine) Vitaliy Sachko (France) Antoine Escoffier (Argentina) Juan Pablo Ficovich (France) Térence Atmane |
| April 17 | Challenger di Roseto degli Abruzzi; Roseto degli Abruzzi, Italy; Clay – Challenger 75 – 32S/24Q/16D; Singles – Doubles | (Austria) Filip Misolic; 4–6, 7–5, 7–6^{(8–6)} | (Belgium) Raphaël Collignon | (Czech Republic) Dalibor Svrčina (Romania) Nicholas David Ionel | (Italy) Andrea Pellegrino (Netherlands) Jesper de Jong (Belgium) Gauthier Onclin (Italy) Franco Agamenone |
| April 17 | Challenger di Roseto degli Abruzzi; Roseto degli Abruzzi, Italy; Clay – Challenger 75 – 32S/24Q/16D; Singles – Doubles | (France) Dan Added (France) Titouan Droguet; 6–2, 1–6, [12–10] | (Italy) Jacopo Berrettini (Italy) Andrea Pellegrino | (Czech Republic) Dalibor Svrčina (Romania) Nicholas David Ionel | (Italy) Andrea Pellegrino (Netherlands) Jesper de Jong (Belgium) Gauthier Onclin (Italy) Franco Agamenone |
| April 17 | Tallahassee Tennis Challenger; Tallahassee, United States; Clay – Challenger 75 – 32S/24Q/16D; Singles – Doubles | (Belgium) Zizou Bergs; 7–5, 6–2 | (Chinese Taipei) Wu Tung-lin | (South Korea) Hong Seong-chan (France) Enzo Couacaud | (China) Zhang Zhizhen (Tunisia) Moez Echargui (United States) Thai-Son Kwiatkowski (United States) Alex Michelsen |
| April 17 | Tallahassee Tennis Challenger; Tallahassee, United States; Clay – Challenger 75 – 32S/24Q/16D; Singles – Doubles | (Argentina) Federico Agustín Gómez (Argentina) Nicolás Kicker; 7–6^{(7–2)}, 4–6, [13–11] | (United States) William Blumberg (Venezuela) Luis David Martínez | (South Korea) Hong Seong-chan (France) Enzo Couacaud | (China) Zhang Zhizhen (Tunisia) Moez Echargui (United States) Thai-Son Kwiatkowski (United States) Alex Michelsen |
| April 24 | Seoul Open Challenger; Seoul, South Korea; Hard – Challenger 125 – 32S/24Q/16D; Singles – Doubles | (China) Bu Yunchaokete; 7–6^{(7–4)}, 6–4 | (Australia) Aleksandar Vukic | (Japan) Yasutaka Uchiyama (South Korea) Chung Yun-seong | (South Korea) Hong Seong-chan (United States) Denis Kudla (Australia) Rinky Hijikata (United States) Christopher Eubanks |
| April 24 | Seoul Open Challenger; Seoul, South Korea; Hard – Challenger 125 – 32S/24Q/16D; Singles – Doubles | (Australia) Max Purcell (Japan) Yasutaka Uchiyama; 6–1, 6–4 | (South Korea) Chung Yun-seong (Japan) Yuta Shimizu | (Japan) Yasutaka Uchiyama (South Korea) Chung Yun-seong | (South Korea) Hong Seong-chan (United States) Denis Kudla (Australia) Rinky Hijikata (United States) Christopher Eubanks |
| April 24 | Ostra Group Open; Ostrava, Czech Republic; Clay – Challenger 75 – 32S/24Q/16D; Singles – Doubles | (Czech Republic) Zdeněk Kolář; 6–3, 6–2 | (Hungary) Máté Valkusz | (Japan) Shintaro Mochizuki (Italy) Riccardo Bonadio | (Bosnia and Herzegovina) Damir Džumhur (Belgium) Gauthier Onclin (Portugal) Frederico Ferreira Silva (Czech Republic) Jiří Veselý |
| April 24 | Ostra Group Open; Ostrava, Czech Republic; Clay – Challenger 75 – 32S/24Q/16D; Singles – Doubles | (United States) Robert Galloway (Mexico) Miguel Ángel Reyes-Varela; 7–5, 7–6^{(7–5)} | (Argentina) Guido Andreozzi (Argentina) Guillermo Durán | (Japan) Shintaro Mochizuki (Italy) Riccardo Bonadio | (Bosnia and Herzegovina) Damir Džumhur (Belgium) Gauthier Onclin (Portugal) Frederico Ferreira Silva (Czech Republic) Jiří Veselý |
| April 24 | Garden Open; Rome, Italy; Clay – Challenger 75 – 32S/24Q/16D; Singles – Doubles | (India) Sumit Nagal; 6–3, 6–2 | (Netherlands) Jesper de Jong | (Belgium) Joris De Loore (Italy) Flavio Cobolli | (Switzerland) Alexander Ritschard (Netherlands) Max Houkes (Argentina) Marco Trungelliti (Italy) Franco Agamenone |
| April 24 | Garden Open; Rome, Italy; Clay – Challenger 75 – 32S/24Q/16D; Singles – Doubles | (Colombia) Nicolás Barrientos (Portugal) Francisco Cabral; 6–3, 6–1 | (Kazakhstan) Andrey Golubev (Ukraine) Denys Molchanov | (Belgium) Joris De Loore (Italy) Flavio Cobolli | (Switzerland) Alexander Ritschard (Netherlands) Max Houkes (Argentina) Marco Trungelliti (Italy) Franco Agamenone |
| April 24 | Savannah Challenger; Savannah, United States; Clay – Challenger 75 – 32S/24Q/16D; Singles – Doubles | (Argentina) Facundo Díaz Acosta; 6–3, 6–1 | (United States) Tristan Boyer | (France) Calvin Hemery (United States) Patrick Kypson | (Belgium) Zizou Bergs (United States) Mitchell Krueger (Argentina) Nicolás Kicker (Tunisia) Aziz Dougaz |
| April 24 | Savannah Challenger; Savannah, United States; Clay – Challenger 75 – 32S/24Q/16D; Singles – Doubles | (United States) William Blumberg (Venezuela) Luis David Martínez; 6–1, 6–4 | (Argentina) Federico Agustín Gómez (Argentina) Nicolás Kicker | (France) Calvin Hemery (United States) Patrick Kypson | (Belgium) Zizou Bergs (United States) Mitchell Krueger (Argentina) Nicolás Kicker (Tunisia) Aziz Dougaz |
| April 24 | Challenger AAT; Buenos Aires, Argentina; Clay – Challenger 50 – 32S/24Q/16D; Singles – Doubles | (Brazil) Thiago Seyboth Wild; 6–3, 6–3 | (Italy) Luciano Darderi | (Argentina) Andrea Collarini (Argentina) Mariano Navone | (Argentina) Gonzalo Villanueva (Argentina) Santiago Rodríguez Taverna (Argentina) Hernán Casanova (Argentina) Román Andrés Burruchaga |
| April 24 | Challenger AAT; Buenos Aires, Argentina; Clay – Challenger 50 – 32S/24Q/16D; Singles – Doubles | (Argentina) Francisco Comesaña (Brazil) Thiago Seyboth Wild; 6–3, 6–7^{(5–7)}, [10–6] | (Argentina) Hernán Casanova (Argentina) Santiago Rodríguez Taverna | (Argentina) Andrea Collarini (Argentina) Mariano Navone | (Argentina) Gonzalo Villanueva (Argentina) Santiago Rodríguez Taverna (Argentina) Hernán Casanova (Argentina) Román Andrés Burruchaga |

=== May ===
| Week of | Tournament | Champions | Runners-up | Semifinalists | Quarterfinalists |
|---|---|---|---|---|---|
| May 1 | Open Aix Provence; Aix-en-Provence, France; Clay – Challenger 175 – 28S/16Q/16D; Singles – Doubles | (United Kingdom) Andy Murray; 2–6, 6–1, 6–2 | (United States) Tommy Paul | (Belgium) David Goffin (France) Harold Mayot | (Austria) Jurij Rodionov (France) Arthur Fils (France) Luca Van Assche (Kazakhstan) Alexander Bublik |
| May 1 | Open Aix Provence; Aix-en-Provence, France; Clay – Challenger 175 – 28S/16Q/16D; Singles – Doubles | (Australia) Jason Kubler (Australia) John Peers; 6–7^{(5–7)}, 6–4, [10–7] | (Portugal) Nuno Borges (Portugal) Francisco Cabral | (Belgium) David Goffin (France) Harold Mayot | (Austria) Jurij Rodionov (France) Arthur Fils (France) Luca Van Assche (Kazakhstan) Alexander Bublik |
| May 1 | Sardegna Open; Cagliari, Italy; Clay – Challenger 175 – 28S/16Q/16D; Singles – Doubles | (France) Ugo Humbert; 4–6, 7–5, 6–4 | (Serbia) Laslo Djere | (Colombia) Daniel Elahi Galán (United States) Ben Shelton | (Croatia) Borna Gojo (Japan) Taro Daniel (Australia) Thanasi Kokkinakis (Italy) Giulio Zeppieri |
| May 1 | Sardegna Open; Cagliari, Italy; Clay – Challenger 175 – 28S/16Q/16D; Singles – Doubles | (Austria) Alexander Erler (Austria) Lucas Miedler; 7–6^{(8–6)}, 6–3 | (Argentina) Máximo González (Argentina) Andrés Molteni | (Colombia) Daniel Elahi Galán (United States) Ben Shelton | (Croatia) Borna Gojo (Japan) Taro Daniel (Australia) Thanasi Kokkinakis (Italy) Giulio Zeppieri |
| May 1 | Gwangju Open; Gwangju, South Korea; Hard – Challenger 75 – 32S/24Q/16D; Singles – Doubles | (Australia) Jordan Thompson; 6–3, 6–2 | (Australia) Max Purcell | (Australia) Marc Polmans (United States) Christopher Eubanks | (Ecuador) Emilio Gómez (Chinese Taipei) Jason Jung (Australia) Rinky Hijikata (China) Bu Yunchaokete |
| May 1 | Gwangju Open; Gwangju, South Korea; Hard – Challenger 75 – 32S/24Q/16D; Singles – Doubles | (United States) Evan King (United States) Reese Stalder; 6–4, 6–2 | (Australia) Andrew Harris (Australia) John-Patrick Smith | (Australia) Marc Polmans (United States) Christopher Eubanks | (Ecuador) Emilio Gómez (Chinese Taipei) Jason Jung (Australia) Rinky Hijikata (China) Bu Yunchaokete |
| May 1 | Advantage Cars Prague Open; Prague, Czech Republic; Clay – Challenger 75 – 32S/24Q/16D; Singles – Doubles | (Switzerland) Dominic Stricker; 7–6^{(9–7)}, 6–3 | (Austria) Sebastian Ofner | (Serbia) Filip Krajinović (Slovakia) Lukáš Klein | (Germany) Dominik Koepfer (Czech Republic) Dalibor Svrčina (Czech Republic) Zdeněk Kolář (Chile) Tomás Barrios Vera |
| May 1 | Advantage Cars Prague Open; Prague, Czech Republic; Clay – Challenger 75 – 32S/24Q/16D; Singles – Doubles | (Czech Republic) Petr Nouza (Czech Republic) Andrew Paulson; 6–4, 6–3 | (Czech Republic) Jiří Barnat (Czech Republic) Jan Hrazdil | (Serbia) Filip Krajinović (Slovakia) Lukáš Klein | (Germany) Dominik Koepfer (Czech Republic) Dalibor Svrčina (Czech Republic) Zdeněk Kolář (Chile) Tomás Barrios Vera |
| May 1 | Challenger Coquimbo; Coquimbo, Chile; Clay – Challenger 50 – 32S/24Q/16D; Singles – Doubles | (Brazil) Matheus Pucinelli de Almeida; 7–6^{(7–1)}, 6–7^{(4–7)}, 6–4 | (Brazil) João Lucas Reis da Silva | (Argentina) Román Andrés Burruchaga (Brazil) Thiago Seyboth Wild | (Dominican Republic) Nick Hardt (Argentina) Santiago Rodríguez Taverna (Italy) Facundo Juárez (Brazil) Mateus Alves |
| May 1 | Challenger Coquimbo; Coquimbo, Chile; Clay – Challenger 50 – 32S/24Q/16D; Singles – Doubles | (Argentina) Valerio Aboian (Bolivia) Murkel Dellien; 7–6^{(7–4)}, 6–0 | (Argentina) Tomás Farjat (Italy) Facundo Juárez | (Argentina) Román Andrés Burruchaga (Brazil) Thiago Seyboth Wild | (Dominican Republic) Nick Hardt (Argentina) Santiago Rodríguez Taverna (Italy) Facundo Juárez (Brazil) Mateus Alves |
| May 8 | Busan Open; Busan, South Korea; Hard – Challenger 125 – 32S/24Q/16D; Singles – Doubles | (Australia) Aleksandar Vukic; 6–4, 1–0 ret. | (Australia) Max Purcell | (Canada) Gabriel Diallo (United States) Brandon Holt | (Japan) Yasutaka Uchiyama (Australia) Jordan Thompson (Australia) Li Tu (United States) Christopher Eubanks |
| May 8 | Busan Open; Busan, South Korea; Hard – Challenger 125 – 32S/24Q/16D; Singles – Doubles | (United States) Evan King (United States) Reese Stalder; Walkover | (Australia) Max Purcell (New Zealand) Rubin Statham | (Canada) Gabriel Diallo (United States) Brandon Holt | (Japan) Yasutaka Uchiyama (Australia) Jordan Thompson (Australia) Li Tu (United States) Christopher Eubanks |
| May 8 | Upper Austria Open; Mauthausen, Austria; Clay – Challenger 100 – 32S/24Q/16D; Singles – Doubles | (Serbia) Hamad Medjedovic; 6–2, 6–7^{(5–7)}, 6–4 | (Austria) Filip Misolic | (Austria) Dominic Thiem (Austria) Sebastian Ofner | (Croatia) Dino Prižmić (Austria) Dennis Novak (Argentina) Facundo Bagnis (France) Hugo Gaston |
| May 8 | Upper Austria Open; Mauthausen, Austria; Clay – Challenger 100 – 32S/24Q/16D; Singles – Doubles | (Monaco) Romain Arneodo (Austria) Sam Weissborn; 6–4, 6–2 | (Germany) Constantin Frantzen (Germany) Hendrik Jebens | (Austria) Dominic Thiem (Austria) Sebastian Ofner | (Croatia) Dino Prižmić (Austria) Dennis Novak (Argentina) Facundo Bagnis (France) Hugo Gaston |
| May 8 | Internazionali di Tennis d'Abruzzo; Francavilla al Mare, Italy; Clay – Challenger 75 – 32S/24Q/16D; Singles – Doubles | (Chile) Alejandro Tabilo; 6–1, 7–5 | (France) Benoît Paire | (Italy) Lorenzo Giustino (Romania) Nicholas David Ionel | (Belgium) Raphaël Collignon (Italy) Gianluca Mager (Belgium) Kimmer Coppejans (Argentina) Thiago Agustín Tirante |
| May 8 | Internazionali di Tennis d'Abruzzo; Francavilla al Mare, Italy; Clay – Challenger 75 – 32S/24Q/16D; Singles – Doubles | (Colombia) Nicolás Barrientos (Uruguay) Ariel Behar; 7–6^{(7–1)}, 3–6, [10–6] | (Netherlands) Sander Arends (Greece) Petros Tsitsipas | (Italy) Lorenzo Giustino (Romania) Nicholas David Ionel | (Belgium) Raphaël Collignon (Italy) Gianluca Mager (Belgium) Kimmer Coppejans (Argentina) Thiago Agustín Tirante |
| May 8 | Sparta Prague Open; Prague, Czech Republic; Clay – Challenger 75 – 32S/24Q/16D; Singles – Doubles | (Czech Republic) Jakub Menšík; 6–4, 6–3 | (Germany) Dominik Koepfer | (Spain) Alejandro Moro Cañas (Argentina) Nicolás Kicker | (Australia) Akira Santillan (Japan) Shintaro Mochizuki (Slovakia) Lukáš Klein (Switzerland) Henri Laaksonen |
| May 8 | Sparta Prague Open; Prague, Czech Republic; Clay – Challenger 75 – 32S/24Q/16D; Singles – Doubles | (France) Dan Added (France) Albano Olivetti; 6–4, 6–3 | (Latvia) Miķelis Lībietis (United States) Hunter Reese | (Spain) Alejandro Moro Cañas (Argentina) Nicolás Kicker | (Australia) Akira Santillan (Japan) Shintaro Mochizuki (Slovakia) Lukáš Klein (Switzerland) Henri Laaksonen |
| May 15 | BNP Paribas Primrose Bordeaux; Bordeaux, France; Clay – Challenger 175 – 28S/16Q/16D; Singles – Doubles | (France) Ugo Humbert; 7–6^{(7–3)}, 6–4 | (Argentina) Tomás Martín Etcheverry | (Germany) Jan-Lennard Struff (France) Richard Gasquet | (France) Corentin Moutet (Spain) Albert Ramos Viñolas (Sweden) Mikael Ymer (Switzerland) Stan Wawrinka |
| May 15 | BNP Paribas Primrose Bordeaux; Bordeaux, France; Clay – Challenger 175 – 28S/16Q/16D; Singles – Doubles | (United Kingdom) Lloyd Glasspool (Finland) Harri Heliövaara; 6–4, 6–2 | (France) Sadio Doumbia (France) Fabien Reboul | (Germany) Jan-Lennard Struff (France) Richard Gasquet | (France) Corentin Moutet (Spain) Albert Ramos Viñolas (Sweden) Mikael Ymer (Switzerland) Stan Wawrinka |
| May 15 | Piemonte Open; Turin, Italy; Clay – Challenger 175 – 28S/16Q/16D; Singles – Doubles | (Germany) Dominik Koepfer; 6–7^{(5–7)}, 6–2, 6–0 | (Italy) Federico Gaio | (Argentina) Sebastián Báez (Colombia) Daniel Elahi Galán | (Brazil) Thiago Seyboth Wild (Argentina) Andrea Collarini (Italy) Edoardo Lavagno (Italy) Flavio Cobolli |
| May 15 | Piemonte Open; Turin, Italy; Clay – Challenger 175 – 28S/16Q/16D; Singles – Doubles | (Kazakhstan) Andrey Golubev (Ukraine) Denys Molchanov; 7–6^{(7–4)}, 6–7^{(6–8)}, [10–5] | (United States) Nathaniel Lammons (Australia) John Peers | (Argentina) Sebastián Báez (Colombia) Daniel Elahi Galán | (Brazil) Thiago Seyboth Wild (Argentina) Andrea Collarini (Italy) Edoardo Lavagno (Italy) Flavio Cobolli |
| May 15 | Tunis Open; Tunis, Tunisia; Clay – Challenger 75 – 32S/24Q/16D; Singles – Doubles | (Japan) Sho Shimabukuro; 6–4, 6–4 | (France) Geoffrey Blancaneaux | (Croatia) Borna Gojo (Netherlands) Jesper de Jong | (Czech Republic) Jakub Menšík (Germany) Maximilian Marterer (Tunisia) Aziz Dougaz (Bosnia and Herzegovina) Damir Džumhur |
| May 15 | Tunis Open; Tunis, Tunisia; Clay – Challenger 75 – 32S/24Q/16D; Singles – Doubles | (France) Théo Arribagé (France) Luca Sanchez; 4–6, 6–3, [10–5] | (Australia) James McCabe (Tunisia) Aziz Ouakaa | (Croatia) Borna Gojo (Netherlands) Jesper de Jong | (Czech Republic) Jakub Menšík (Germany) Maximilian Marterer (Tunisia) Aziz Dougaz (Bosnia and Herzegovina) Damir Džumhur |
| May 15 | Open de Oeiras II; Oeiras, Portugal; Clay – Challenger 75 – 32S/24Q/16D; Singles – Doubles | (Argentina) Facundo Díaz Acosta; 6–4, 6–3 | (Australia) Aleksandar Vukic | (United States) Nicolas Moreno de Alboran (Brazil) Felipe Meligeni Alves | (Argentina) Pedro Cachin (Moldova) Radu Albot (Switzerland) Alexander Ritschard (Spain) Pedro Martínez |
| May 15 | Open de Oeiras II; Oeiras, Portugal; Clay – Challenger 75 – 32S/24Q/16D; Singles – Doubles | (United Kingdom) Luke Johnson (Netherlands) Sem Verbeek; 6–7^{(6–8)}, 7–5, [10–6] | (Portugal) Jaime Faria (Portugal) Henrique Rocha | (United States) Nicolas Moreno de Alboran (Brazil) Felipe Meligeni Alves | (Argentina) Pedro Cachin (Moldova) Radu Albot (Switzerland) Alexander Ritschard (Spain) Pedro Martínez |
| May 22 | Macedonian Open; Skopje, North Macedonia; Clay – Challenger 75 – 32S/24Q/16D; Singles – Doubles | (Hungary) Máté Valkusz; 6–3, 6–4 | (Argentina) Francisco Comesaña | (Sweden) Dragoș Nicolae Mădăraș; Evgeny Donskoy | (Tunisia) Aziz Dougaz (Italy) Alexander Weis (United States) Oliver Crawford (South Korea) Gerard Campaña Lee |
| May 22 | Macedonian Open; Skopje, North Macedonia; Clay – Challenger 75 – 32S/24Q/16D; Singles – Doubles | (Czech Republic) Petr Nouza (Czech Republic) Andrew Paulson; 7–6^{(7–5)}, 6–3 | (India) Sriram Balaji (India) Jeevan Nedunchezhiyan | (Sweden) Dragoș Nicolae Mădăraș; Evgeny Donskoy | (Tunisia) Aziz Dougaz (Italy) Alexander Weis (United States) Oliver Crawford (South Korea) Gerard Campaña Lee |
| May 29 | Little Rock Challenger; Little Rock, United States; Hard – Challenger 75 – 32S/24Q/16D; Singles – Doubles | (Estonia) Mark Lajal; 6–4, 7–5 | (Kazakhstan) Beibit Zhukayev | (France) Antoine Escoffier (Australia) Adam Walton | (Tunisia) Aziz Dougaz (United States) Thai-Son Kwiatkowski (Canada) Alexis Galarneau (Kazakhstan) Mikhail Kukushkin |
| May 29 | Little Rock Challenger; Little Rock, United States; Hard – Challenger 75 – 32S/24Q/16D; Singles – Doubles | (South Korea) Nam Ji-sung (New Zealand) Artem Sitak; 6–4, 6–4 | (Canada) Alexis Galarneau (United States) Nicolas Moreno de Alboran | (France) Antoine Escoffier (Australia) Adam Walton | (Tunisia) Aziz Dougaz (United States) Thai-Son Kwiatkowski (Canada) Alexis Galarneau (Kazakhstan) Mikhail Kukushkin |
| May 29 | Saturn Oil Open; Troisdorf, Germany; Clay – Challenger 75 – 32S/24Q/16D; Singles – Doubles | Ivan Gakhov; 6–2, 5–7, 6–3 | (Portugal) Frederico Ferreira Silva | Pavel Kotov (India) Sumit Nagal | (Latvia) Robert Strombachs (Dominican Republic) Nick Hardt (Ukraine) Oleksii Krutykh (Argentina) Renzo Olivo |
| May 29 | Saturn Oil Open; Troisdorf, Germany; Clay – Challenger 75 – 32S/24Q/16D; Singles – Doubles | (Spain) Íñigo Cervantes (Spain) Oriol Roca Batalla; 6–2, 7–6^{(7–1)} | (France) Manuel Guinard (France) Grégoire Jacq | Pavel Kotov (India) Sumit Nagal | (Latvia) Robert Strombachs (Dominican Republic) Nick Hardt (Ukraine) Oleksii Krutykh (Argentina) Renzo Olivo |
| May 29 | Internazionali di Tennis Città di Vicenza; Vicenza, Italy; Clay – Challenger 75 – 32S/24Q/16D; Singles – Doubles | (Argentina) Francisco Comesaña; 3–6, 6–2, 6–2 | (Spain) Pablo Llamas Ruiz | (Italy) Francesco Passaro (Argentina) Román Andrés Burruchaga | (Argentina) Santiago Rodríguez Taverna (Brazil) Matheus Pucinelli de Almeida (Croatia) Nino Serdarušić (Italy) Luca Nardi |
| May 29 | Internazionali di Tennis Città di Vicenza; Vicenza, Italy; Clay – Challenger 75 – 32S/24Q/16D; Singles – Doubles | (India) Anirudh Chandrasekar (India) Vijay Sundar Prashanth; 6–3, 6–2 | (Brazil) Fernando Romboli (Brazil) Marcelo Zormann | (Italy) Francesco Passaro (Argentina) Román Andrés Burruchaga | (Argentina) Santiago Rodríguez Taverna (Brazil) Matheus Pucinelli de Almeida (Croatia) Nino Serdarušić (Italy) Luca Nardi |

=== June ===
| Week of | Tournament | Champions | Runners-up | Semifinalists | Quarterfinalists |
|---|---|---|---|---|---|
| June 5 | Heilbronner Neckarcup; Heilbronn, Germany; Clay – Challenger 125 – 32S/24Q/16D; Singles – Doubles | (Italy) Matteo Arnaldi; 7–6^{(7–4)}, 6–1 | (Argentina) Facundo Díaz Acosta | (Germany) Rudolf Molleker (Spain) Pedro Martínez | (Australia) Akira Santillan (Colombia) Daniel Elahi Galán; Pavel Kotov (Spain) Jaume Munar |
| June 5 | Heilbronner Neckarcup; Heilbronn, Germany; Clay – Challenger 125 – 32S/24Q/16D; Singles – Doubles | (Germany) Constantin Frantzen (Germany) Hendrik Jebens; 7–6^{(9–7)}, 6–4 | (Romania) Victor Vlad Cornea (Austria) Philipp Oswald | (Germany) Rudolf Molleker (Spain) Pedro Martínez | (Australia) Akira Santillan (Colombia) Daniel Elahi Galán; Pavel Kotov (Spain) Jaume Munar |
| June 5 | Surbiton Trophy; Surbiton, United Kingdom; Grass – Challenger 125 – 32S/24Q/16D; Singles – Doubles | (United Kingdom) Andy Murray; 6–3, 6–2 | (Austria) Jurij Rodionov | (Belgium) Zizou Bergs (Australia) Jordan Thompson | (Canada) Gabriel Diallo (France) Constant Lestienne (Australia) Rinky Hijikata (Australia) Jason Kubler |
| June 5 | Surbiton Trophy; Surbiton, United Kingdom; Grass – Challenger 125 – 32S/24Q/16D; Singles – Doubles | (United Kingdom) Liam Broady (United Kingdom) Jonny O'Mara; 6–4, 5–7, [10–8] | (Australia) Alexei Popyrin (Australia) Aleksandar Vukic | (Belgium) Zizou Bergs (Australia) Jordan Thompson | (Canada) Gabriel Diallo (France) Constant Lestienne (Australia) Rinky Hijikata (Australia) Jason Kubler |
| June 5 | UniCredit Czech Open; Prostějov, Czech Republic; Clay – Challenger 100 – 32S/24Q/16D; Singles – Doubles | (Czech Republic) Dalibor Svrčina; 6–4, 6–2 | (Czech Republic) Tomáš Macháč | (Slovakia) Lukáš Klein (Argentina) Francisco Comesaña | (Czech Republic) Jiří Lehečka (Czech Republic) Jakub Menšík (Bulgaria) Dimitar Kuzmanov (Argentina) Román Andrés Burruchaga |
| June 5 | UniCredit Czech Open; Prostějov, Czech Republic; Clay – Challenger 100 – 32S/24Q/16D; Singles – Doubles | (Uruguay) Ariel Behar (Czech Republic) Adam Pavlásek; 7–5, 6–4 | (Italy) Marco Bortolotti (Spain) Sergio Martos Gornés | (Slovakia) Lukáš Klein (Argentina) Francisco Comesaña | (Czech Republic) Jiří Lehečka (Czech Republic) Jakub Menšík (Bulgaria) Dimitar Kuzmanov (Argentina) Román Andrés Burruchaga |
| June 5 | Tyler Tennis Championships; Tyler, United States; Hard – Challenger 75 – 32S/24Q/16D; Singles – Doubles | (United States) Nicolas Moreno de Alboran; 6–7^{(8–10)}, 7–6^{(7–0)}, 6–4 | (Kazakhstan) Mikhail Kukushkin | (Germany) Peter Gojowczyk (Canada) Alexis Galarneau | (United States) Adam Neff (United States) Tennys Sandgren (Japan) Yuta Shimizu (Tunisia) Skander Mansouri |
| June 5 | Tyler Tennis Championships; Tyler, United States; Hard – Challenger 75 – 32S/24Q/16D; Singles – Doubles | (Australia) Alex Bolt (Australia) Andrew Harris; 6–1, 6–4 | (United States) Evan King (United States) Reese Stalder | (Germany) Peter Gojowczyk (Canada) Alexis Galarneau | (United States) Adam Neff (United States) Tennys Sandgren (Japan) Yuta Shimizu (Tunisia) Skander Mansouri |
| June 12 | Nottingham Open; Nottingham, United Kingdom; Grass – Challenger 125 – 32S/24Q/16D; Singles – Doubles | (United Kingdom) Andy Murray; 6–4, 6–4 | (France) Arthur Cazaux | (Portugal) Nuno Borges (Germany) Dominik Koepfer | (Switzerland) Dominic Stricker (Japan) Sho Shimabukuro (Canada) Gabriel Diallo (United Kingdom) George Loffhagen |
| June 12 | Nottingham Open; Nottingham, United Kingdom; Grass – Challenger 125 – 32S/24Q/16D; Singles – Doubles | (United Kingdom) Jacob Fearnley (United Kingdom) Johannus Monday; 6–3, 6–7^{(6–8)}, [10–7] | (United Kingdom) Liam Broady (United Kingdom) Jonny O'Mara | (Portugal) Nuno Borges (Germany) Dominik Koepfer | (Switzerland) Dominic Stricker (Japan) Sho Shimabukuro (Canada) Gabriel Diallo (United Kingdom) George Loffhagen |
| June 12 | Internazionali di Tennis Città di Perugia; Perugia, Italy; Clay – Challenger 125 – 32S/24Q/16D; Singles – Doubles | (Hungary) Fábián Marozsán; 6–2, 6–3 | (Italy) Edoardo Lavagno | (Argentina) Pedro Cachin (France) Alexandre Müller | (Bosnia and Herzegovina) Nerman Fatić (Italy) Francesco Maestrelli (Spain) Jaume Munar (Italy) Raúl Brancaccio |
| June 12 | Internazionali di Tennis Città di Perugia; Perugia, Italy; Clay – Challenger 125 – 32S/24Q/16D; Singles – Doubles | (Bolivia) Boris Arias (Bolivia) Federico Zeballos; 7–6^{(7–3)}, 7–6^{(8–6)} | (Italy) Luciano Darderi (Argentina) Juan Pablo Paz | (Argentina) Pedro Cachin (France) Alexandre Müller | (Bosnia and Herzegovina) Nerman Fatić (Italy) Francesco Maestrelli (Spain) Jaume Munar (Italy) Raúl Brancaccio |
| June 12 | Bratislava Open; Bratislava, Slovakia; Clay – Challenger 100 – 32S/24Q/16D; Singles – Doubles | (Ukraine) Vitaliy Sachko; 2–6, 6–2, 7–6^{(7–2)} | (Bulgaria) Dimitar Kuzmanov | (Slovakia) Alex Molčan (Chile) Tomás Barrios Vera | (Czech Republic) Tomáš Macháč (Switzerland) Jérôme Kym (Argentina) Federico Coria (Czech Republic) Jakub Menšík |
| June 12 | Bratislava Open; Bratislava, Slovakia; Clay – Challenger 100 – 32S/24Q/16D; Singles – Doubles | (Uruguay) Ariel Behar (Czech Republic) Adam Pavlásek; 6–4, 6–4 | (Austria) Neil Oberleitner (Germany) Tim Sandkaulen | (Slovakia) Alex Molčan (Chile) Tomás Barrios Vera | (Czech Republic) Tomáš Macháč (Switzerland) Jérôme Kym (Argentina) Federico Coria (Czech Republic) Jakub Menšík |
| June 12 | Open Sopra Steria de Lyon; Lyon, France; Clay – Challenger 100 – 32S/24Q/16D; Singles – Doubles | (Brazil) Felipe Meligeni Alves; 6–4, 0–6, 7–6^{(9–7)} | (Switzerland) Alexander Ritschard | (Spain) Alejandro Moro Cañas (France) Gabriel Debru | (Spain) Pablo Llamas Ruiz (France) Mathias Bourgue (Italy) Salvatore Caruso (France) Benoît Paire |
| June 12 | Open Sopra Steria de Lyon; Lyon, France; Clay – Challenger 100 – 32S/24Q/16D; Singles – Doubles | (France) Manuel Guinard (France) Grégoire Jacq; 6–4, 2–6, [10–7] | (Germany) Constantin Frantzen (Germany) Hendrik Jebens | (Spain) Alejandro Moro Cañas (France) Gabriel Debru | (Spain) Pablo Llamas Ruiz (France) Mathias Bourgue (Italy) Salvatore Caruso (France) Benoît Paire |
| June 12 | Caribbean Open; Palmas del Mar, Puerto Rico; Hard – Challenger 75 – 32S/24Q/16D; Singles – Doubles | (Japan) Kei Nishikori; 6–2, 7–5 | (United States) Michael Zheng | (Kazakhstan) Beibit Zhukayev (Brazil) Gustavo Heide | (Canada) Liam Draxl (Canada) Alexis Galarneau (Australia) Adam Walton (Australia) Bernard Tomic |
| June 12 | Caribbean Open; Palmas del Mar, Puerto Rico; Hard – Challenger 75 – 32S/24Q/16D; Singles – Doubles | (United States) Evan King (United States) Reese Stalder; 3–6, 7–5, [11–9] | (Japan) Toshihide Matsui (Japan) Kaito Uesugi | (Kazakhstan) Beibit Zhukayev (Brazil) Gustavo Heide | (Canada) Liam Draxl (Canada) Alexis Galarneau (Australia) Adam Walton (Australia) Bernard Tomic |
| June 19 | Ilkley Trophy; Ilkley, United Kingdom; Grass – Challenger 125 – 32S/24Q/16D; Singles – Doubles | (Australia) Jason Kubler; 6–4, 6–4 | (Austria) Sebastian Ofner | (France) Arthur Cazaux (Hungary) Zsombor Piros | (Japan) Sho Shimabukuro (China) Shang Juncheng (United States) Denis Kudla (United Kingdom) Charles Broom |
| June 19 | Ilkley Trophy; Ilkley, United Kingdom; Grass – Challenger 125 – 32S/24Q/16D; Singles – Doubles | (Ecuador) Gonzalo Escobar (Kazakhstan) Aleksandr Nedovyesov; 2–6, 7–5, [11–9] | (United States) Robert Galloway (Australia) John-Patrick Smith | (France) Arthur Cazaux (Hungary) Zsombor Piros | (Japan) Sho Shimabukuro (China) Shang Juncheng (United States) Denis Kudla (United Kingdom) Charles Broom |
| June 19 | Emilia-Romagna Open; Montechiarugolo, Italy; Clay – Challenger 125 – 32S/24Q/16D; Singles – Doubles | (France) Alexandre Müller; 6–1, 6–4 | (Italy) Francesco Maestrelli | (Italy) Giulio Zeppieri (Italy) Stefano Travaglia | (Spain) Albert Ramos Viñolas (Argentina) Andrea Collarini (Italy) Alessandro Giannessi (Brazil) Thiago Monteiro |
| June 19 | Emilia-Romagna Open; Montechiarugolo, Italy; Clay – Challenger 125 – 32S/24Q/16D; Singles – Doubles | (France) Jonathan Eysseric (Mexico) Miguel Ángel Reyes-Varela; 6–2, 6–3 | (Switzerland) Luca Margaroli (India) Ramkumar Ramanathan | (Italy) Giulio Zeppieri (Italy) Stefano Travaglia | (Spain) Albert Ramos Viñolas (Argentina) Andrea Collarini (Italy) Alessandro Giannessi (Brazil) Thiago Monteiro |
| June 19 | Poznań Open; Poznań, Poland; Clay – Challenger 100 – 32S/24Q/16D; Singles – Doubles | (Argentina) Mariano Navone; 7–5, 6–3 | (Chile) Tomás Barrios Vera | (Czech Republic) Zdeněk Kolář (Germany) Timo Stodder | (United States) Ulises Blanch (Argentina) Facundo Díaz Acosta (Poland) Daniel Michalski (France) Manuel Guinard |
| June 19 | Poznań Open; Poznań, Poland; Clay – Challenger 100 – 32S/24Q/16D; Singles – Doubles | (Poland) Karol Drzewiecki (Czech Republic) Petr Nouza; 7–6^{(7–2)}, 7–6^{(7–2)} | (Uruguay) Ariel Behar (Czech Republic) Adam Pavlásek | (Czech Republic) Zdeněk Kolář (Germany) Timo Stodder | (United States) Ulises Blanch (Argentina) Facundo Díaz Acosta (Poland) Daniel Michalski (France) Manuel Guinard |
| June 19 | Internationaux de Tennis de Blois; Blois, France; Clay – Challenger 75 – 32S/24Q/16D; Singles – Doubles | (France) Quentin Halys; 4–6, 6–2, 2–0 ret. | (France) Kyrian Jacquet | (Lebanon) Benjamin Hassan (Spain) Nikolás Sánchez Izquierdo | (Argentina) Renzo Olivo (France) Harold Mayot (France) Ugo Blanchet (France) Kenny de Schepper |
| June 19 | Internationaux de Tennis de Blois; Blois, France; Clay – Challenger 75 – 32S/24Q/16D; Singles – Doubles | (France) Dan Added (France) Grégoire Jacq; 6–4, 6–4 | (France) Théo Arribagé (France) Luca Sanchez | (Lebanon) Benjamin Hassan (Spain) Nikolás Sánchez Izquierdo | (Argentina) Renzo Olivo (France) Harold Mayot (France) Ugo Blanchet (France) Kenny de Schepper |
| June 19 | Cali Open; Cali, Colombia; Clay – Challenger 75 – 32S/24Q/16D; Singles – Doubles | (Argentina) Federico Delbonis; 6–4, 6–7^{(6–8)}, 6–3 | (Argentina) Guido Andreozzi | (Argentina) Santiago Rodríguez Taverna (Brazil) Pedro Sakamoto | (Chile) Alejandro Tabilo (Brazil) Gustavo Heide (Austria) Gerald Melzer (Brazil) Pedro Boscardin Dias |
| June 19 | Cali Open; Cali, Colombia; Clay – Challenger 75 – 32S/24Q/16D; Singles – Doubles | (Argentina) Guido Andreozzi (Colombia) Cristian Rodríguez; 6–3, 6–4 | (Brazil) Orlando Luz (Ukraine) Oleg Prihodko | (Argentina) Santiago Rodríguez Taverna (Brazil) Pedro Sakamoto | (Chile) Alejandro Tabilo (Brazil) Gustavo Heide (Austria) Gerald Melzer (Brazil) Pedro Boscardin Dias |
| June 26 | Modena Challenger; Modena, Italy; Clay – Challenger 75 – 32S/24Q/16D; Singles – Doubles | (United States) Emilio Nava; 6–7^{(5–7)}, 7–6^{(8–6)}, 6–4 | (France) Titouan Droguet | (Bosnia and Herzegovina) Nerman Fatić (Tunisia) Moez Echargui | (Argentina) Federico Coria (Poland) Maks Kaśnikowski (Italy) Gianmarco Ferrari (France) Térence Atmane |
| June 26 | Modena Challenger; Modena, Italy; Clay – Challenger 75 – 32S/24Q/16D; Singles – Doubles | (United States) William Blumberg (Venezuela) Luis David Martínez; 6–4, 6–4 | (Czech Republic) Roman Jebavý (Ukraine) Vladyslav Manafov | (Bosnia and Herzegovina) Nerman Fatić (Tunisia) Moez Echargui | (Argentina) Federico Coria (Poland) Maks Kaśnikowski (Italy) Gianmarco Ferrari (France) Térence Atmane |
| June 26 | Open Rionegro; Medellín, Colombia; Clay – Challenger 50 – 32S/24Q/16D; Singles – Doubles | (United States) Patrick Kypson; 6–3, 6–3 | (Zimbabwe) Benjamin Lock | (Colombia) Adrià Soriano Barrera (Brazil) Eduardo Ribeiro | (Colombia) Nicolás Mejía (Croatia) Nino Serdarušić (Chile) Matías Soto (Argentina) Santiago Rodríguez Taverna |
| June 26 | Open Rionegro; Medellín, Colombia; Clay – Challenger 50 – 32S/24Q/16D; Singles – Doubles | (Colombia) Juan Sebastián Gómez (Colombia) Andrés Urrea; 6–3, 7–6^{(12–10)} | (Brazil) Orlando Luz (Ukraine) Oleg Prihodko | (Colombia) Adrià Soriano Barrera (Brazil) Eduardo Ribeiro | (Colombia) Nicolás Mejía (Croatia) Nino Serdarušić (Chile) Matías Soto (Argentina) Santiago Rodríguez Taverna |

=== July ===
| Week of | Tournament | Champions | Runners-up | Semifinalists | Quarterfinalists |
|---|---|---|---|---|---|
| July 3 | Cranbrook Tennis Classic; Bloomfield Hills, United States; Hard – Challenger 75 – 32S/24Q/16D; Singles – Doubles | (United States) Steve Johnson; 6–4, 6–7^{(7–9)}, 7–6^{(7–4)} | (Kazakhstan) Mikhail Kukushkin | (United States) Tennys Sandgren (Australia) Tristan Schoolkate | (India) Mukund Sasikumar (United States) Denis Kudla (Australia) Omar Jasika (Japan) Yasutaka Uchiyama |
| July 3 | Cranbrook Tennis Classic; Bloomfield Hills, United States; Hard – Challenger 75 – 32S/24Q/16D; Singles – Doubles | (Australia) Tristan Schoolkate (Australia) Adam Walton; 7–5, 6–3 | (Australia) Blake Ellis (Australia) Calum Puttergill | (United States) Tennys Sandgren (Australia) Tristan Schoolkate | (India) Mukund Sasikumar (United States) Denis Kudla (Australia) Omar Jasika (Japan) Yasutaka Uchiyama |
| July 3 | Tennis Open Karlsruhe; Karlsruhe, Germany; Clay – Challenger 75 – 32S/24Q/16D; Singles – Doubles | (Chile) Alejandro Tabilo; 2–6, 1–0 ret. | (Italy) Giulio Zeppieri | (Hungary) Zsombor Piros (Kazakhstan) Timofey Skatov | (Brazil) Thiago Seyboth Wild; Ivan Gakhov (Lebanon) Hady Habib (Switzerland) Leandro Riedi |
| July 3 | Tennis Open Karlsruhe; Karlsruhe, Germany; Clay – Challenger 75 – 32S/24Q/16D; Singles – Doubles | (Austria) Neil Oberleitner (Germany) Tim Sandkaulen; 6–1, 6–1 | (Czech Republic) Vít Kopřiva (Greece) Michail Pervolarakis | (Hungary) Zsombor Piros (Kazakhstan) Timofey Skatov | (Brazil) Thiago Seyboth Wild; Ivan Gakhov (Lebanon) Hady Habib (Switzerland) Leandro Riedi |
| July 3 | Aspria Tennis Cup; Milan, Italy; Clay – Challenger 75 – 32S/24Q/16D; Singles – Doubles | (Argentina) Facundo Díaz Acosta; 6–3, 6–3 | (Italy) Matteo Gigante | (Italy) Flavio Cobolli (Italy) Luciano Darderi | (Belgium) Gauthier Onclin (Argentina) Thiago Agustín Tirante (Italy) Luca Nardi (Argentina) Lautaro Midón |
| July 3 | Aspria Tennis Cup; Milan, Italy; Clay – Challenger 75 – 32S/24Q/16D; Singles – Doubles | (France) Jonathan Eysseric (Ukraine) Denys Molchanov; 6–2, 6–4 | (France) Théo Arribagé (France) Luca Sanchez | (Italy) Flavio Cobolli (Italy) Luciano Darderi | (Belgium) Gauthier Onclin (Argentina) Thiago Agustín Tirante (Italy) Luca Nardi (Argentina) Lautaro Midón |
| July 3 | Internationaux de Tennis de Troyes; Troyes, France; Clay – Challenger 50 – 32S/24Q/16D; Singles – Doubles | (France) Manuel Guinard; 6–4, 6–3 | (France) Calvin Hemery | (Spain) David Jordà Sanchis (Croatia) Duje Ajduković | (Italy) Lorenzo Giustino (Italy) Giovanni Fonio (France) Térence Atmane (Norway) Viktor Durasovic |
| July 3 | Internationaux de Tennis de Troyes; Troyes, France; Clay – Challenger 50 – 32S/24Q/16D; Singles – Doubles | (France) Manuel Guinard (France) Grégoire Jacq; Walkover | (Spain) Álvaro López San Martín (Spain) Daniel Rincón | (Spain) David Jordà Sanchis (Croatia) Duje Ajduković | (Italy) Lorenzo Giustino (Italy) Giovanni Fonio (France) Térence Atmane (Norway) Viktor Durasovic |
| July 3 | Challenger Santa Fe; Santa Fe, Argentina; Clay – Challenger 50 – 32S/24Q/16D; Singles – Doubles | (Argentina) Mariano Navone; 6–2, 6–4 | (Paraguay) Daniel Vallejo | (Argentina) Francisco Comesaña (Argentina) Román Andrés Burruchaga | (Argentina) Tomás Farjat (Ecuador) Álvaro Guillén Meza (Brazil) Pedro Boscardin Dias (Argentina) Ignacio Monzón |
| July 3 | Challenger Santa Fe; Santa Fe, Argentina; Clay – Challenger 50 – 32S/24Q/16D; Singles – Doubles | (United States) Vasil Kirkov (Chile) Matías Soto; 7–6^{(7–3)}, 6–2 | (Uruguay) Ignacio Carou (Argentina) Ignacio Monzón | (Argentina) Francisco Comesaña (Argentina) Román Andrés Burruchaga | (Argentina) Tomás Farjat (Ecuador) Álvaro Guillén Meza (Brazil) Pedro Boscardin Dias (Argentina) Ignacio Monzón |
| July 10 | Brawo Open; Braunschweig, Germany; Clay – Challenger 125 – 32S/24Q/16D; Singles – Doubles | (Italy) Franco Agamenone; 7–5, 6–3 | Pavel Kotov | (Lebanon) Benjamin Hassan (Brazil) Thiago Seyboth Wild | (Germany) Daniel Altmaier (Denmark) August Holmgren (Slovakia) Jozef Kovalík (United Kingdom) Jan Choinski |
| July 10 | Brawo Open; Braunschweig, Germany; Clay – Challenger 125 – 32S/24Q/16D; Singles – Doubles | (France) Pierre-Hugues Herbert (France) Arthur Reymond; 7–6^{(9–7)}, 6–4 | (India) Rithvik Choudary Bollipalli (India) Arjun Kadhe | (Lebanon) Benjamin Hassan (Brazil) Thiago Seyboth Wild | (Germany) Daniel Altmaier (Denmark) August Holmgren (Slovakia) Jozef Kovalík (United Kingdom) Jan Choinski |
| July 10 | Salzburg Open; Salzburg, Austria; Clay – Challenger 125 – 32S/24Q/16D; Singles – Doubles | (Austria) Sebastian Ofner; 6–3, 6–2 | (Austria) Lukas Neumayer | (Slovenia) Blaž Rola (Argentina) Juan Manuel Cerúndolo | (Austria) Filip Misolic (Brazil) Thiago Monteiro (Bosnia and Herzegovina) Nerman Fatić (Sweden) Elias Ymer |
| July 10 | Salzburg Open; Salzburg, Austria; Clay – Challenger 125 – 32S/24Q/16D; Singles – Doubles | (Kazakhstan) Andrey Golubev (Ukraine) Denys Molchanov; 6–4, 7–6^{(10–8)} | (India) Anirudh Chandrasekar (India) Vijay Sundar Prashanth | (Slovenia) Blaž Rola (Argentina) Juan Manuel Cerúndolo | (Austria) Filip Misolic (Brazil) Thiago Monteiro (Bosnia and Herzegovina) Nerman Fatić (Sweden) Elias Ymer |
| July 10 | Iași Open; Iași, Romania; Clay – Challenger 100 – 32S/24Q/16D; Singles – Doubles | (France) Hugo Gaston; 3–6, 6–0, 6–4 | (Spain) Bernabé Zapata Miralles | (Chile) Cristian Garín (Canada) Steven Diez | (Czech Republic) Jakub Menšík (Italy) Riccardo Bonadio (Ukraine) Vitaliy Sachko (North Macedonia) Kalin Ivanovski |
| July 10 | Iași Open; Iași, Romania; Clay – Challenger 100 – 32S/24Q/16D; Singles – Doubles | (Colombia) Nicolás Barrientos (Pakistan) Aisam-ul-Haq Qureshi; 6–3, 6–3 | (Romania) Gabi Adrian Boitan (Romania) Bogdan Pavel | (Chile) Cristian Garín (Canada) Steven Diez | (Czech Republic) Jakub Menšík (Italy) Riccardo Bonadio (Ukraine) Vitaliy Sachko (North Macedonia) Kalin Ivanovski |
| July 10 | San Benedetto Tennis Cup; San Benedetto del Tronto, Italy; Clay – Challenger 100 – 32S/24Q/16D; Singles – Doubles | (France) Benoît Paire; 4–6, 6–1, 6–1 | (France) Richard Gasquet | (Spain) Daniel Rincón (Chile) Alejandro Tabilo | (Italy) Flavio Cobolli (Bulgaria) Dimitar Kuzmanov (Belgium) Kimmer Coppejans (Italy) Luciano Darderi |
| July 10 | San Benedetto Tennis Cup; San Benedetto del Tronto, Italy; Clay – Challenger 100 – 32S/24Q/16D; Singles – Doubles | (Brazil) Fernando Romboli (Brazil) Marcelo Zormann; 6–3, 6–4 | (Ecuador) Diego Hidalgo (Colombia) Cristian Rodríguez | (Spain) Daniel Rincón (Chile) Alejandro Tabilo | (Italy) Flavio Cobolli (Bulgaria) Dimitar Kuzmanov (Belgium) Kimmer Coppejans (Italy) Luciano Darderi |
| July 10 | Chicago Men's Challenger; Chicago, United States; Hard – Challenger 75 – 32S/24Q/16D; Singles – Doubles | (United States) Alex Michelsen; 7–5, 6–2 | (Japan) Yuta Shimizu | (France) Giovanni Mpetshi Perricard (China) Shang Juncheng | (Chinese Taipei) Jason Jung (Estonia) Mark Lajal (United States) Ethan Quinn (Japan) Kei Nishikori |
| July 10 | Chicago Men's Challenger; Chicago, United States; Hard – Challenger 75 – 32S/24Q/16D; Singles – Doubles | (Latvia) Miķelis Lībietis (Tunisia) Skander Mansouri; 7–6^{(7–5)}, 6–3 | (South Korea) Chung Yun-seong (Australia) Andrew Harris | (France) Giovanni Mpetshi Perricard (China) Shang Juncheng | (Chinese Taipei) Jason Jung (Estonia) Mark Lajal (United States) Ethan Quinn (Japan) Kei Nishikori |
| July 17 | Championnats Banque Nationale de Granby; Granby, Canada; Hard – Challenger 100 – 32S/24Q/16D; Singles – Doubles | (Canada) Alexis Galarneau; 6–4, 3–6, 6–3 | (Australia) Philip Sekulic | (Japan) James Trotter (Chinese Taipei) Wu Tung-lin | (Australia) James McCabe (Canada) Justin Boulais (France) Maxime Janvier (Australia) Tristan Schoolkate |
| July 17 | Championnats Banque Nationale de Granby; Granby, Canada; Hard – Challenger 100 – 32S/24Q/16D; Singles – Doubles | (United States) Christian Harrison (Latvia) Miķelis Lībietis; 6–4, 6–3 | (Australia) Tristan Schoolkate (Australia) Adam Walton | (Japan) James Trotter (Chinese Taipei) Wu Tung-lin | (Australia) James McCabe (Canada) Justin Boulais (France) Maxime Janvier (Australia) Tristan Schoolkate |
| July 17 | Internazionali di Tennis Città di Trieste; Trieste, Italy; Clay – Challenger 100 – 32S/24Q/16D; Singles – Doubles | (France) Hugo Gaston; 6–3, 5–7, 6–2 | (Italy) Francesco Passaro | (Hungary) Fábián Marozsán (Spain) Pedro Martínez | (Italy) Enrico Dalla Valle (Argentina) Guido Andreozzi (France) Kyrian Jacquet (Italy) Stefano Napolitano |
| July 17 | Internazionali di Tennis Città di Trieste; Trieste, Italy; Clay – Challenger 100 – 32S/24Q/16D; Singles – Doubles | (Australia) Matthew Romios (Australia) Jason Taylor; 4–6, 7–5, [10–6] | (Italy) Marco Bortolotti (Italy) Andrea Pellegrino | (Hungary) Fábián Marozsán (Spain) Pedro Martínez | (Italy) Enrico Dalla Valle (Argentina) Guido Andreozzi (France) Kyrian Jacquet (Italy) Stefano Napolitano |
| July 17 | Dutch Open; Amersfoort, Netherlands; Clay – Challenger 75 – 32S/24Q/16D; Singles – Doubles | (Germany) Maximilian Marterer; 6–4, 6–2 | (France) Titouan Droguet | (France) Mathys Erhard (Germany) Rudolf Molleker | (Argentina) Facundo Díaz Acosta (Netherlands) Alec Deckers (Belgium) Gauthier Onclin (Belgium) Michael Geerts |
| July 17 | Dutch Open; Amersfoort, Netherlands; Clay – Challenger 75 – 32S/24Q/16D; Singles – Doubles | (France) Manuel Guinard (France) Grégoire Jacq; 6–4, 6–4 | (Netherlands) Mats Hermans (Netherlands) Sander Jong | (France) Mathys Erhard (Germany) Rudolf Molleker | (Argentina) Facundo Díaz Acosta (Netherlands) Alec Deckers (Belgium) Gauthier Onclin (Belgium) Michael Geerts |
| July 17 | Open de Tenis Ciudad de Pozoblanco; Pozoblanco, Spain; Hard – Challenger 75 – 32S/24Q/16D; Singles – Doubles | (France) Hugo Grenier; 6–7^{(4–7)}, 6–2, 7–6^{(7–3)} | (Argentina) Juan Pablo Ficovich | (Spain) Alejandro Moro Cañas (France) Térence Atmane | (France) Antoine Escoffier (France) Dan Added (Lithuania) Edas Butvilas (Israel) Daniel Cukierman |
| July 17 | Open de Tenis Ciudad de Pozoblanco; Pozoblanco, Spain; Hard – Challenger 75 – 32S/24Q/16D; Singles – Doubles | (South Korea) Nam Ji-sung (South Korea) Song Min-kyu; 2–6, 6–4, [10–8] | (United Kingdom) Luke Johnson (Zimbabwe) Benjamin Lock | (Spain) Alejandro Moro Cañas (France) Térence Atmane | (France) Antoine Escoffier (France) Dan Added (Lithuania) Edas Butvilas (Israel) Daniel Cukierman |
| July 17 | Tampere Open; Tampere, Finland; Clay – Challenger 75 – 32S/24Q/16D; Singles – Doubles | (India) Sumit Nagal; 6–4, 7–5 | (Czech Republic) Dalibor Svrčina | (Germany) Henri Squire (Spain) Daniel Rincón | (Poland) Daniel Michalski (Slovakia) Lukáš Klein (Croatia) Duje Ajduković (Tunisia) Aziz Dougaz |
| July 17 | Tampere Open; Tampere, Finland; Clay – Challenger 75 – 32S/24Q/16D; Singles – Doubles | (Poland) Szymon Kielan (Poland) Piotr Matuszewski; 6–4, 7–6^{(9–7)} | (Ukraine) Vladyslav Orlov (Australia) Adam Taylor | (Germany) Henri Squire (Spain) Daniel Rincón | (Poland) Daniel Michalski (Slovakia) Lukáš Klein (Croatia) Duje Ajduković (Tunisia) Aziz Dougaz |
| July 24 | Zug Open; Zug, Switzerland; Clay – Challenger 125 – 32S/24Q/16D; Singles – Doubles | (France) Arthur Rinderknech; 3–6, 6–3, 6–4 | (Belgium) Joris De Loore | (Austria) Jurij Rodionov (Italy) Fabio Fognini | (Bulgaria) Adrian Andreev (Belgium) Zizou Bergs (Czech Republic) Jakub Menšík (Italy) Matteo Gigante |
| July 24 | Zug Open; Zug, Switzerland; Clay – Challenger 125 – 32S/24Q/16D; Singles – Doubles | (France) Théo Arribagé (France) Luca Sanchez; 6–3, 7–5 | (Turkey) Ergi Kırkın (Czech Republic) Dalibor Svrčina | (Austria) Jurij Rodionov (Italy) Fabio Fognini | (Bulgaria) Adrian Andreev (Belgium) Zizou Bergs (Czech Republic) Jakub Menšík (Italy) Matteo Gigante |
| July 24 | Open Castilla y León; Segovia, Spain; Hard – Challenger 100 – 32S/24Q/16D; Singles – Doubles | (Spain) Pablo Llamas Ruiz; 7–6^{(11–9)}, 7–6^{(7–5)} | (France) Antoine Escoffier | (France) Térence Atmane (United States) Nicolas Moreno de Alboran | (Hungary) Márton Fucsovics (Spain) David Jordà Sanchis (Spain) Fernando Verdasco (Argentina) Juan Pablo Ficovich |
| July 24 | Open Castilla y León; Segovia, Spain; Hard – Challenger 100 – 32S/24Q/16D; Singles – Doubles | (France) Dan Added (France) Pierre-Hugues Herbert; 4–6, 6–3, [12–10] | (Philippines) Francis Alcantara (China) Sun Fajing | (France) Térence Atmane (United States) Nicolas Moreno de Alboran | (Hungary) Márton Fucsovics (Spain) David Jordà Sanchis (Spain) Fernando Verdasco (Argentina) Juan Pablo Ficovich |
| July 24 | Internazionali di Tennis Città di Verona; Verona, Italy; Clay – Challenger 100 – 32S/24Q/16D; Singles – Doubles | (Czech Republic) Vít Kopřiva; 1–6, 7–6^{(7–3)}, 6–2 | (Ukraine) Vitaliy Sachko | (Belgium) David Goffin (France) Mathias Bourgue | (Italy) Stefano Napolitano (Argentina) Francisco Comesaña (Italy) Francesco Passaro (Italy) Luciano Darderi |
| July 24 | Internazionali di Tennis Città di Verona; Verona, Italy; Clay – Challenger 100 – 32S/24Q/16D; Singles – Doubles | (Italy) Federico Gaio (Italy) Andrea Pellegrino; 7–6^{(8–6)}, 6–2 | (Brazil) Daniel Dutra da Silva (Dominican Republic) Nick Hardt | (Belgium) David Goffin (France) Mathias Bourgue | (Italy) Stefano Napolitano (Argentina) Francisco Comesaña (Italy) Francesco Passaro (Italy) Luciano Darderi |
| July 24 | Salinas Challenger; Salinas, Ecuador; Hard – Challenger 75 – 32S/24Q/16D; Singles – Doubles | (Ukraine) Illya Marchenko; 6–4, 6–4 | (Croatia) Matija Pecotić | (Turkey) Altuğ Çelikbilek (France) Giovanni Mpetshi Perricard | (Australia) Omar Jasika (Jordan) Abdullah Shelbayh (Kazakhstan) Beibit Zhukayev (Japan) Rio Noguchi |
| July 24 | Salinas Challenger; Salinas, Ecuador; Hard – Challenger 75 – 32S/24Q/16D; Singles – Doubles | (United States) Vasil Kirkov (United States) Alfredo Perez; 7–5, 7–5 | (Ecuador) Ángel Díaz Jalil (Ecuador) Álvaro Guillén Meza | (Turkey) Altuğ Çelikbilek (France) Giovanni Mpetshi Perricard | (Australia) Omar Jasika (Jordan) Abdullah Shelbayh (Kazakhstan) Beibit Zhukayev (Japan) Rio Noguchi |
| July 24 | President's Cup; Astana, Kazakhstan; Hard – Challenger 50 – 32S/24Q/16D; Singles – Doubles | (Kazakhstan) Denis Yevseyev; 7–5, 2–6, 6–4 | (Uzbekistan) Khumoyun Sultanov | Evgeny Karlovskiy (Turkey) Yankı Erel | (Kazakhstan) Mikhail Kukushkin; Evgeny Philippov; Alexander Zgirovsky (Zimbabwe) Benjamin Lock |
| July 24 | President's Cup; Astana, Kazakhstan; Hard – Challenger 50 – 32S/24Q/16D; Singles – Doubles | (India) S D Prajwal Dev (India) Niki Kaliyanda Poonacha; 6–3, 7–6^{(7–4)} | (Japan) Toshihide Matsui (Japan) Kaito Uesugi | Evgeny Karlovskiy (Turkey) Yankı Erel | (Kazakhstan) Mikhail Kukushkin; Evgeny Philippov; Alexander Zgirovsky (Zimbabwe) Benjamin Lock |
| July 31 | Porto Open; Porto, Portugal; Hard – Challenger 125 – 32S/24Q/16D; Singles – Doubles | (Italy) Luca Nardi; 5–7, 6–4, 6–1 | (Portugal) João Sousa | (France) Jules Marie (France) Antoine Escoffier | (Kazakhstan) Denis Yevseyev (France) Pierre-Hugues Herbert (Bulgaria) Adrian Andreev (Canada) Steven Diez |
| July 31 | Porto Open; Porto, Portugal; Hard – Challenger 125 – 32S/24Q/16D; Singles – Doubles | (Japan) Toshihide Matsui (Japan) Kaito Uesugi; 6–7^{(5–7)}, 6–3, [10–5] | (India) Rithvik Choudary Bollipalli (India) Arjun Kadhe | (France) Jules Marie (France) Antoine Escoffier | (Kazakhstan) Denis Yevseyev (France) Pierre-Hugues Herbert (Bulgaria) Adrian Andreev (Canada) Steven Diez |
| July 31 | San Marino Open; San Marino, San Marino; Clay – Challenger 125 – 32S/24Q/16D; Singles – Doubles | (Spain) Jaume Munar; 6–4, 6–1 | (Italy) Andrea Pellegrino | (Bosnia and Herzegovina) Nerman Fatić (Spain) Daniel Rincón | (Italy) Alexander Weis (Belgium) David Goffin (Italy) Fabio Fognini (Argentina) Federico Delbonis |
| July 31 | San Marino Open; San Marino, San Marino; Clay – Challenger 125 – 32S/24Q/16D; Singles – Doubles | Ivan Liutarevich (Ukraine) Vladyslav Manafov; 6–4, 7–6^{(10–8)} | (France) Théo Arribagé (France) Luca Sanchez | (Bosnia and Herzegovina) Nerman Fatić (Spain) Daniel Rincón | (Italy) Alexander Weis (Belgium) David Goffin (Italy) Fabio Fognini (Argentina) Federico Delbonis |
| July 31 | Platzmann-Sauerland Open; Lüdenscheid, Germany; Clay – Challenger 100 – 32S/24Q/16D; Singles – Doubles | (Croatia) Duje Ajduković; 7–5, 6–4 | (Bolivia) Hugo Dellien | (Italy) Raúl Brancaccio (France) Benoît Paire | (Germany) Rudolf Molleker (Argentina) Camilo Ugo Carabelli (Belgium) Gauthier Onclin (Spain) Pedro Martínez |
| July 31 | Platzmann-Sauerland Open; Lüdenscheid, Germany; Clay – Challenger 100 – 32S/24Q/16D; Singles – Doubles | (Switzerland) Luca Margaroli (Argentina) Santiago Rodríguez Taverna; 7–6^{(7–4)}, 6–4 | (Germany) Jakob Schnaitter (Germany) Kai Wehnelt | (Italy) Raúl Brancaccio (France) Benoît Paire | (Germany) Rudolf Molleker (Argentina) Camilo Ugo Carabelli (Belgium) Gauthier Onclin (Spain) Pedro Martínez |
| July 31 | Lexington Challenger; Lexington, United States; Hard – Challenger 75 – 32S/24Q/16D; Singles – Doubles | (United States) Steve Johnson; 7–6^{(7–5)}, 6–4 | (France) Arthur Cazaux | (United States) Cannon Kingsley (United States) Tennys Sandgren | (United States) Aidan Mayo (Chinese Taipei) Wu Tung-lin (South Korea) Hong Seong-chan (United States) Ulises Blanch |
| July 31 | Lexington Challenger; Lexington, United States; Hard – Challenger 75 – 32S/24Q/16D; Singles – Doubles | (United States) Eliot Spizzirri (United States) Tyler Zink; 4–6, 6–3, [10–8] | (United States) George Goldhoff (United States) Vasil Kirkov | (United States) Cannon Kingsley (United States) Tennys Sandgren | (United States) Aidan Mayo (Chinese Taipei) Wu Tung-lin (South Korea) Hong Seong-chan (United States) Ulises Blanch |
| July 31 | Svijany Open; Liberec, Czech Republic; Clay – Challenger 75 – 32S/24Q/16D; Singles – Doubles | (Argentina) Francisco Comesaña; 6–2, 6–4 | (United States) Toby Kodat | (South Korea) Gerard Campaña Lee (France) Ugo Blanchet | (Argentina) Hernán Casanova (Argentina) Federico Agustín Gómez (Czech Republic) Dalibor Svrčina (Croatia) Dino Prižmić |
| July 31 | Svijany Open; Liberec, Czech Republic; Clay – Challenger 75 – 32S/24Q/16D; Singles – Doubles | (Czech Republic) Petr Nouza (Czech Republic) Andrew Paulson; 6–3, 6–4 | (Austria) Neil Oberleitner (Germany) Tim Sandkaulen | (South Korea) Gerard Campaña Lee (France) Ugo Blanchet | (Argentina) Hernán Casanova (Argentina) Federico Agustín Gómez (Czech Republic) Dalibor Svrčina (Croatia) Dino Prižmić |

=== August ===
| Week of | Tournament | Champions | Runners-up | Semifinalists | Quarterfinalists |
|---|---|---|---|---|---|
| August 7 | RD Open; Santo Domingo, Dominican Republic; Clay – Challenger 125 – 32S/24Q/16D; Singles – Doubles | (Argentina) Genaro Alberto Olivieri; 7–5, 2–6, 6–4 | (Argentina) Marco Trungelliti | (Argentina) Federico Coria (Argentina) Francisco Comesaña | (Australia) Bernard Tomic (Bolivia) Murkel Dellien (Brazil) Felipe Meligeni Alves (Chile) Alejandro Tabilo |
| August 7 | RD Open; Santo Domingo, Dominican Republic; Clay – Challenger 125 – 32S/24Q/16D; Singles – Doubles | (Brazil) Pedro Boscardin Dias (Brazil) Gustavo Heide; 6–4, 7–5 | (Ecuador) Diego Hidalgo (Colombia) Cristian Rodríguez | (Argentina) Federico Coria (Argentina) Francisco Comesaña | (Australia) Bernard Tomic (Bolivia) Murkel Dellien (Brazil) Felipe Meligeni Alves (Chile) Alejandro Tabilo |
| August 7 | Banja Luka Challenger; Banja Luka, Bosnia and Herzegovina; Clay – Challenger 100 – 32S/24Q/16D; Singles – Doubles | (Croatia) Dino Prižmić; 6–2, 6–3 | (Belgium) Kimmer Coppejans | (Hungary) Fábián Marozsán (Germany) Marko Topo | (Spain) Javier Barranco Cosano (Bosnia and Herzegovina) Damir Džumhur (Slovakia) Norbert Gombos (United States) Toby Kodat |
| August 7 | Banja Luka Challenger; Banja Luka, Bosnia and Herzegovina; Clay – Challenger 100 – 32S/24Q/16D; Singles – Doubles | (Romania) Victor Vlad Cornea (Austria) Philipp Oswald; 3–6, 6–1, [15–13] | (Kazakhstan) Andrey Golubev (Ukraine) Denys Molchanov | (Hungary) Fábián Marozsán (Germany) Marko Topo | (Spain) Javier Barranco Cosano (Bosnia and Herzegovina) Damir Džumhur (Slovakia) Norbert Gombos (United States) Toby Kodat |
| August 7 | Cary Challenger; Cary, United States; Hard – Challenger 75 – 32S/24Q/16D; Singles – Doubles | (Australia) Adam Walton; 6–4, 3–6, 7–5 | (United States) Nicolas Moreno de Alboran | (United States) Patrick Kypson (United Kingdom) Liam Broady | (Chinese Taipei) Wu Tung-lin (United Kingdom) Ryan Peniston (South Africa) Lloyd Harris (Australia) Rinky Hijikata |
| August 7 | Cary Challenger; Cary, United States; Hard – Challenger 75 – 32S/24Q/16D; Singles – Doubles | (United States) Evan King (United States) Reese Stalder; 6–3, 7–6^{(7–4)} | (Latvia) Miķelis Lībietis (Australia) Adam Walton | (United States) Patrick Kypson (United Kingdom) Liam Broady | (Chinese Taipei) Wu Tung-lin (United Kingdom) Ryan Peniston (South Africa) Lloyd Harris (Australia) Rinky Hijikata |
| August 7 | Internazionali di Tennis del Friuli Venezia Giulia; Cordenons, Italy; Clay – Challenger 75 – 32S/24Q/16D; Singles – Doubles | (Italy) Matteo Gigante; 6–0, 6–2 | (Austria) Lukas Neumayer | (Italy) Riccardo Bonadio (Italy) Enrico Dalla Valle | (France) Matteo Martineau (Spain) Carlos Sánchez Jover (Argentina) Hernán Casanova (Argentina) Federico Agustín Gómez |
| August 7 | Internazionali di Tennis del Friuli Venezia Giulia; Cordenons, Italy; Clay – Challenger 75 – 32S/24Q/16D; Singles – Doubles | (Italy) Giovanni Fonio (Italy) Francesco Forti; 5–7, 6–1, [10–7] | (India) Niki Kaliyanda Poonacha (Australia) Adam Taylor | (Italy) Riccardo Bonadio (Italy) Enrico Dalla Valle | (France) Matteo Martineau (Spain) Carlos Sánchez Jover (Argentina) Hernán Casanova (Argentina) Federico Agustín Gómez |
| August 7 | Meerbusch Challenger; Meerbusch, Germany; Clay – Challenger 75 – 32S/24Q/16D; Singles – Doubles | (United Kingdom) Jan Choinski; 6–4, 6–0 | (Argentina) Camilo Ugo Carabelli | (France) Manuel Guinard (France) Titouan Droguet | (Spain) Daniel Rincón (Lebanon) Benjamin Hassan (Germany) Max Hans Rehberg (Bulgaria) Dimitar Kuzmanov |
| August 7 | Meerbusch Challenger; Meerbusch, Germany; Clay – Challenger 75 – 32S/24Q/16D; Singles – Doubles | (France) Manuel Guinard (France) Grégoire Jacq; 7–5, 7–6^{(7–3)} | (Brazil) Fernando Romboli (Brazil) Marcelo Zormann | (France) Manuel Guinard (France) Titouan Droguet | (Spain) Daniel Rincón (Lebanon) Benjamin Hassan (Germany) Max Hans Rehberg (Bulgaria) Dimitar Kuzmanov |
| August 14 | Golden Gate Open; Stanford, United States; Hard – Challenger 125 – 32S/24Q/16D; Singles – Doubles | (France) Constant Lestienne; 7–6^{(7–4)}, 6–2 | (United States) Emilio Nava | (United States) Tristan Boyer (Japan) Yosuke Watanuki | (United States) Aleksandar Kovacevic (United States) Michael Mmoh (Croatia) Borna Gojo (Australia) James Duckworth |
| August 14 | Golden Gate Open; Stanford, United States; Hard – Challenger 125 – 32S/24Q/16D; Singles – Doubles | (Ecuador) Diego Hidalgo (Colombia) Cristian Rodríguez; 6–7^{(1–7)}, 6–4, [10–8] | (United Kingdom) Julian Cash (United Kingdom) Henry Patten | (United States) Tristan Boyer (Japan) Yosuke Watanuki | (United States) Aleksandar Kovacevic (United States) Michael Mmoh (Croatia) Borna Gojo (Australia) James Duckworth |
| August 14 | Kozerki Open; Grodzisk Mazowiecki, Poland; Hard – Challenger 100 – 32S/24Q/16D; Singles – Doubles | (Netherlands) Jesper de Jong; 6–3, 6–3 | (Lebanon) Benjamin Hassan | (Kazakhstan) Denis Yevseyev (Sweden) Elias Ymer | (France) Maxime Janvier (Romania) Marius Copil (Poland) Maks Kaśnikowski (Poland) Kacper Żuk |
| August 14 | Kozerki Open; Grodzisk Mazowiecki, Poland; Hard – Challenger 100 – 32S/24Q/16D; Singles – Doubles | (France) Théo Arribagé (France) Luca Sanchez; 6–4, 6–4 | (India) Anirudh Chandrasekar (India) Vijay Sundar Prashanth | (Kazakhstan) Denis Yevseyev (Sweden) Elias Ymer | (France) Maxime Janvier (Romania) Marius Copil (Poland) Maks Kaśnikowski (Poland) Kacper Żuk |
| August 14 | Internazionali di Tennis Città di Todi; Todi, Italy; Clay – Challenger 75 – 32S/24Q/16D; Singles – Doubles | (Italy) Luciano Darderi; 6–4, 6–7^{(5–7)}, 6–1 | (France) Clément Tabur | (Italy) Giovanni Fonio (Italy) Francesco Maestrelli | (Tunisia) Moez Echargui (United Kingdom) Felix Gill (Spain) Carlos Sánchez Jover (France) Gabriel Debru |
| August 14 | Internazionali di Tennis Città di Todi; Todi, Italy; Clay – Challenger 75 – 32S/24Q/16D; Singles – Doubles | (Brazil) Fernando Romboli (Brazil) Marcelo Zormann; 6–7^{(13–15)}, 6–4, [10–5] | (Argentina) Román Andrés Burruchaga (Brazil) Orlando Luz | (Italy) Giovanni Fonio (Italy) Francesco Maestrelli | (Tunisia) Moez Echargui (United Kingdom) Felix Gill (Spain) Carlos Sánchez Jover (France) Gabriel Debru |
| August 14 | Winnipeg National Bank Challenger; Winnipeg, Canada; Hard – Challenger 75 – 32S/24Q/16D; Singles – Doubles | (United Kingdom) Ryan Peniston; 6–4, 4–6, 6–4 | (Switzerland) Leandro Riedi | (France) Arthur Cazaux (United Kingdom) Liam Broady | (United Kingdom) Jack Draper (Barbados) Darian King (United Kingdom) Billy Harris (Italy) Mattia Bellucci |
| August 14 | Winnipeg National Bank Challenger; Winnipeg, Canada; Hard – Challenger 75 – 32S/24Q/16D; Singles – Doubles | (Canada) Gabriel Diallo (Switzerland) Leandro Riedi; 6–2, 6–3 | (Canada) Juan Carlos Aguilar (Canada) Taha Baadi | (France) Arthur Cazaux (United Kingdom) Liam Broady | (United Kingdom) Jack Draper (Barbados) Darian King (United Kingdom) Billy Harris (Italy) Mattia Bellucci |
| August 21 | Schwaben Open; Augsburg, Germany; Clay – Challenger 50 – 32S/24Q/16D; Singles – Doubles | (Spain) Carlos Taberner; 6–4, 6–4 | (Spain) Oriol Roca Batalla | (Brazil) Nicolas Zanellato (Germany) Timo Stodder | (Tunisia) Moez Echargui (Croatia) Nino Serdarušić (Italy) Gianmarco Ferrari (Lebanon) Benjamin Hassan |
| August 21 | Schwaben Open; Augsburg, Germany; Clay – Challenger 50 – 32S/24Q/16D; Singles – Doubles | (Germany) Constantin Frantzen (Germany) Hendrik Jebens; 6–2, 6–2 | (France) Constantin Bittoun Kouzmine (Ukraine) Volodymyr Uzhylovskyi | (Brazil) Nicolas Zanellato (Germany) Timo Stodder | (Tunisia) Moez Echargui (Croatia) Nino Serdarušić (Italy) Gianmarco Ferrari (Lebanon) Benjamin Hassan |
| August 21 | Lima Challenger; Lima, Peru; Clay – Challenger 50 – 32S/24Q/16D; Singles – Doubles | (Ecuador) Álvaro Guillén Meza; 7–6^{(7–3)}, 6–1 | (Jamaica) Blaise Bicknell | (Bolivia) Murkel Dellien (Argentina) Renzo Olivo | (Peru) Ignacio Buse (Chile) Gonzalo Lama (Peru) Arklon Huertas del Pino (Peru) Gonzalo Bueno |
| August 21 | Lima Challenger; Lima, Peru; Clay – Challenger 50 – 32S/24Q/16D; Singles – Doubles | (Peru) Gonzalo Bueno (Paraguay) Daniel Vallejo; 6–4, 6–2 | (Peru) Ignacio Buse (Peru) Jorge Panta | (Bolivia) Murkel Dellien (Argentina) Renzo Olivo | (Peru) Ignacio Buse (Chile) Gonzalo Lama (Peru) Arklon Huertas del Pino (Peru) Gonzalo Bueno |
| August 21 | IBG Prague Open; Prague, Czech Republic; Clay – Challenger 50 – 32S/24Q/16D; Singles – Doubles | (Germany) Rudolf Molleker; 6–2, 6–2 | (France) Gabriel Debru | (Portugal) João Sousa (Monaco) Valentin Vacherot | (United States) Toby Kodat (Italy) Luciano Darderi (Argentina) Federico Agustín Gómez (Czech Republic) Andrew Paulson |
| August 21 | IBG Prague Open; Prague, Czech Republic; Clay – Challenger 50 – 32S/24Q/16D; Singles – Doubles | (Czech Republic) Petr Nouza (Czech Republic) Andrew Paulson; 7–5, 6–3 | (Sweden) Filip Bergevi (Netherlands) Mick Veldheer | (Portugal) João Sousa (Monaco) Valentin Vacherot | (United States) Toby Kodat (Italy) Luciano Darderi (Argentina) Federico Agustín Gómez (Czech Republic) Andrew Paulson |
| August 21 | Zhuhai Challenger; Zhuhai, China; Hard – Challenger 50 – 32S/24Q/16D; Singles – Doubles | (France) Arthur Weber; 6–3, 5–7, 6–3 | (Chinese Taipei) Jason Jung | (Greece) Stefanos Sakellaridis (China) Li Zhe | (China) Zhou Yi; Aliaksandr Liaonenka; Evgeny Karlovskiy (Latvia) Robert Strombachs |
| August 21 | Zhuhai Challenger; Zhuhai, China; Hard – Challenger 50 – 32S/24Q/16D; Singles – Doubles | (Switzerland) Luca Castelnuovo (Poland) Filip Peliwo; 7–5, 7–6^{(7–4)} | (China) Li Hanwen (China) Li Zhe | (Greece) Stefanos Sakellaridis (China) Li Zhe | (China) Zhou Yi; Aliaksandr Liaonenka; Evgeny Karlovskiy (Latvia) Robert Strombachs |
| August 28 | Città di Como Challenger; Como, Italy; Clay – Challenger 75 – 32S/24Q/16D; Singles – Doubles | (Brazil) Thiago Seyboth Wild; 5–7, 6–2, 6–3 | (Spain) Pedro Martínez | (France) Benoît Paire (Italy) Stefano Napolitano | (Germany) Rudolf Molleker (Bulgaria) Dimitar Kuzmanov (Italy) Luciano Darderi (India) Sumit Nagal |
| August 28 | Città di Como Challenger; Como, Italy; Clay – Challenger 75 – 32S/24Q/16D; Singles – Doubles | (Germany) Constantin Frantzen (Germany) Hendrik Jebens; 6–3, 6–4 | (Sweden) Filip Bergevi (Netherlands) Mick Veldheer | (France) Benoît Paire (Italy) Stefano Napolitano | (Germany) Rudolf Molleker (Bulgaria) Dimitar Kuzmanov (Italy) Luciano Darderi (India) Sumit Nagal |
| August 28 | Rafa Nadal Open; Mallorca, Spain; Hard – Challenger 75 – 32S/24Q/16D; Singles – Doubles | (Serbia) Hamad Medjedovic; 6–2, 4–6, 6–2 | (France) Harold Mayot | (Bosnia and Herzegovina) Damir Džumhur (Spain) Daniel Rincón | (Dominican Republic) Nick Hardt (Estonia) Mark Lajal (France) Antoine Escoffier (Italy) Mattia Bellucci |
| August 28 | Rafa Nadal Open; Mallorca, Spain; Hard – Challenger 75 – 32S/24Q/16D; Singles – Doubles | (Israel) Daniel Cukierman (United Kingdom) Joshua Paris; 6–4, 6–4 | (India) Sriram Balaji (India) Ramkumar Ramanathan | (Bosnia and Herzegovina) Damir Džumhur (Spain) Daniel Rincón | (Dominican Republic) Nick Hardt (Estonia) Mark Lajal (France) Antoine Escoffier (Italy) Mattia Bellucci |
| August 28 | International Challenger Zhangjiagang; Zhangjiagang, China; Hard – Challenger 75 – 32S/24Q/16D; Singles – Doubles | (France) Térence Atmane; 6–1, 6–2 | Mikalai Haliak | (Australia) James McCabe (Lithuania) Ričardas Berankis | (China) Te Rigele (Japan) Yusuke Takahashi (Northern Mariana Islands) Colin Sinclair (Australia) Li Tu |
| August 28 | International Challenger Zhangjiagang; Zhangjiagang, China; Hard – Challenger 75 – 32S/24Q/16D; Singles – Doubles | (Chinese Taipei) Ray Ho (Australia) Matthew Romios; 6–3, 6–4 | (Philippines) Francis Alcantara (China) Sun Fajing | (Australia) James McCabe (Lithuania) Ričardas Berankis | (China) Te Rigele (Japan) Yusuke Takahashi (Northern Mariana Islands) Colin Sinclair (Australia) Li Tu |

=== September ===
| Week of | Tournament | Champions | Runners-up | Semifinalists | Quarterfinalists |
|---|---|---|---|---|---|
| September 4 | AON Open Challenger; Genoa, Italy; Clay – Challenger 125 – 32S/24Q/16D; Singles – Doubles | (Brazil) Thiago Seyboth Wild; 6–2, 7–6^{(7–3)} | (Italy) Fabio Fognini | (Brazil) Thiago Monteiro (Italy) Andrea Vavassori | (Chinese Taipei) Tseng Chun-hsin (Hungary) Zsombor Piros (Italy) Stefano Napolitano (Argentina) Federico Coria |
| September 4 | AON Open Challenger; Genoa, Italy; Clay – Challenger 125 – 32S/24Q/16D; Singles – Doubles | (Italy) Giovanni Oradini (Italy) Lorenzo Rottoli; 6–4, 6–3 | (Serbia) Ivan Sabanov (Serbia) Matej Sabanov | (Brazil) Thiago Monteiro (Italy) Andrea Vavassori | (Chinese Taipei) Tseng Chun-hsin (Hungary) Zsombor Piros (Italy) Stefano Napolitano (Argentina) Federico Coria |
| September 4 | Copa Sevilla; Seville, Spain; Clay – Challenger 125 – 32S/24Q/16D; Singles – Doubles | (Spain) Roberto Carballés Baena; 6–3, 6–1 | (France) Calvin Hemery | (France) Hugo Gaston (France) Valentin Royer | (Sweden) Elias Ymer (Italy) Alessandro Giannessi (Kazakhstan) Timofey Skatov (Spain) Pablo Llamas Ruiz |
| September 4 | Copa Sevilla; Seville, Spain; Clay – Challenger 125 – 32S/24Q/16D; Singles – Doubles | (Spain) Alberto Barroso Campos (Spain) Pedro Martínez; 3–6, 7–6^{(7–5)}, [11–9] | (India) Sriram Balaji (Brazil) Fernando Romboli | (France) Hugo Gaston (France) Valentin Royer | (Sweden) Elias Ymer (Italy) Alessandro Giannessi (Kazakhstan) Timofey Skatov (Spain) Pablo Llamas Ruiz |
| September 4 | Shanghai Challenger; Shanghai, China; Hard – Challenger 100 – 32S/24Q/16D; Singles – Doubles | (Australia) Christopher O'Connell; 6–3, 7–5 | (Japan) Yosuke Watanuki | (Australia) Li Tu (China) Shang Juncheng | (China) Bai Yan (Switzerland) Antoine Bellier (Italy) Lorenzo Giustino (Vietnam) Lý Hoàng Nam |
| September 4 | Shanghai Challenger; Shanghai, China; Hard – Challenger 100 – 32S/24Q/16D; Singles – Doubles | (Australia) Alex Bolt (Australia) Luke Saville; 4–6, 6–3, [11–9] | (China) Bu Yunchaokete (China) Te Rigele | (Australia) Li Tu (China) Shang Juncheng | (China) Bai Yan (Switzerland) Antoine Bellier (Italy) Lorenzo Giustino (Vietnam) Lý Hoàng Nam |
| September 4 | NÖ Open; Tulln, Austria; Clay – Challenger 100 – 32S/24Q/16D; Singles – Doubles | (Czech Republic) Vít Kopřiva; 6–2, 6–4 | (India) Sumit Nagal | (Italy) Flavio Cobolli (Germany) Maximilian Marterer | (Spain) Albert Ramos Viñolas (Germany) Henri Squire (Argentina) Santiago Rodríguez Taverna (Bulgaria) Dimitar Kuzmanov |
| September 4 | NÖ Open; Tulln, Austria; Clay – Challenger 100 – 32S/24Q/16D; Singles – Doubles | (Czech Republic) Zdeněk Kolář (Slovenia) Blaž Rola; 6–4, 4–6, [10–6] | (Poland) Piotr Matuszewski (Germany) Kai Wehnelt | (Italy) Flavio Cobolli (Germany) Maximilian Marterer | (Spain) Albert Ramos Viñolas (Germany) Henri Squire (Argentina) Santiago Rodríguez Taverna (Bulgaria) Dimitar Kuzmanov |
| September 4 | Cassis Open Provence; Cassis, France; Hard – Challenger 75 – 32S/24Q/16D; Singles – Doubles | (Italy) Mattia Bellucci; 6–3, 6–4 | (Czech Republic) Tomáš Macháč | (France) Alexandre Müller (United Kingdom) Liam Broady | (Italy) Giulio Zeppieri (Spain) Alejandro Moro Cañas (France) Lucas Poullain (United Kingdom) Billy Harris |
| September 4 | Cassis Open Provence; Cassis, France; Hard – Challenger 75 – 32S/24Q/16D; Singles – Doubles | (France) Dan Added (France) Jonathan Eysseric; 6–0, 4–6, [11–9] | (United Kingdom) Liam Broady (France) Antoine Hoang | (France) Alexandre Müller (United Kingdom) Liam Broady | (Italy) Giulio Zeppieri (Spain) Alejandro Moro Cañas (France) Lucas Poullain (United Kingdom) Billy Harris |
| September 4 | Istanbul Challenger; Istanbul, Turkey; Hard – Challenger 75 – 32S/24Q/16D; Singles – Doubles | (Bosnia and Herzegovina) Damir Džumhur; 7–6^{(7–5)}, 6–3 | (Slovakia) Lukáš Klein | (Dominican Republic) Nick Hardt (Netherlands) Jesper de Jong | (Turkey) Altuğ Çelikbilek (Croatia) Dino Prižmić (Kazakhstan) Denis Yevseyev (France) Giovanni Mpetshi Perricard |
| September 4 | Istanbul Challenger; Istanbul, Turkey; Hard – Challenger 75 – 32S/24Q/16D; Singles – Doubles | (United Kingdom) Luke Johnson (Tunisia) Skander Mansouri; 7–6^{(7–3)}, 6–3 | (Netherlands) Sander Arends (Pakistan) Aisam-ul-Haq Qureshi | (Dominican Republic) Nick Hardt (Netherlands) Jesper de Jong | (Turkey) Altuğ Çelikbilek (Croatia) Dino Prižmić (Kazakhstan) Denis Yevseyev (France) Giovanni Mpetshi Perricard |
| September 11 | Szczecin Open; Szczecin, Poland; Clay – Challenger 125 – 32S/24Q/16D; Singles – Doubles | (Argentina) Federico Coria; 6–1, 7–6^{(7–4)} | (Czech Republic) Vít Kopřiva | Alexander Shevchenko (Italy) Francesco Maestrelli | (Italy) Flavio Cobolli (Bulgaria) Adrian Andreev (Spain) Jaume Munar (Argentina) Pedro Cachin |
| September 11 | Szczecin Open; Szczecin, Poland; Clay – Challenger 125 – 32S/24Q/16D; Singles – Doubles | (Czech Republic) Andrew Paulson (Ukraine) Vitaliy Sachko; 6–1, 7–6^{(8–6)} | (Czech Republic) Zdeněk Kolář (Spain) Sergio Martos Gornés | Alexander Shevchenko (Italy) Francesco Maestrelli | (Italy) Flavio Cobolli (Bulgaria) Adrian Andreev (Spain) Jaume Munar (Argentina) Pedro Cachin |
| September 11 | Open de Rennes; Rennes, France; Hard (i) – Challenger 100 – 32S/24Q/16D; Singles – Doubles | (United States) Maxime Cressy; 6–3, 2–0 ret. | (France) Benjamin Bonzi | (France) Matteo Martineau (France) Grégoire Barrère | (France) Richard Gasquet (France) Lucas Pouille (Italy) Mattia Bellucci (Moldova) Radu Albot |
| September 11 | Open de Rennes; Rennes, France; Hard (i) – Challenger 100 – 32S/24Q/16D; Singles – Doubles | (Netherlands) Sander Arends (Netherlands) David Pel; 6–3, 6–2 | (France) Antoine Escoffier (India) Niki Kaliyanda Poonacha | (France) Matteo Martineau (France) Grégoire Barrère | (France) Richard Gasquet (France) Lucas Pouille (Italy) Mattia Bellucci (Moldova) Radu Albot |
| September 11 | Cary Challenger II; Cary, United States; Hard – Challenger 75 – 32S/24Q/16D; Singles – Doubles | (United States) Zachary Svajda; 7–6^{(7–3)}, 4–6, 6–1 | (Australia) Rinky Hijikata | (United States) Patrick Kypson (United States) Alex Michelsen | (Spain) Pedro Vives Marcos (United States) Tennys Sandgren (United Kingdom) Toby Samuel (Argentina) Guido Andreozzi |
| September 11 | Cary Challenger II; Cary, United States; Hard – Challenger 75 – 32S/24Q/16D; Singles – Doubles | (Australia) Andrew Harris (Australia) Rinky Hijikata; 6–4, 3–6, [10–6] | (United States) William Blumberg (Venezuela) Luis David Martínez | (United States) Patrick Kypson (United States) Alex Michelsen | (Spain) Pedro Vives Marcos (United States) Tennys Sandgren (United Kingdom) Toby Samuel (Argentina) Guido Andreozzi |
| September 11 | Guangzhou International Challenger; Guangzhou, China; Hard – Challenger 75 – 32S/24Q/16D; Singles – Doubles | (France) Térence Atmane; 4–6, 7–6^{(9–7)}, 6–4 | (Australia) Marc Polmans | (China) Bu Yunchaokete; Evgeny Donskoy | (Australia) Christopher O'Connell (Australia) Dane Sweeny (Australia) Omar Jasika (Australia) Li Tu |
| September 11 | Guangzhou International Challenger; Guangzhou, China; Hard – Challenger 75 – 32S/24Q/16D; Singles – Doubles | (Switzerland) Antoine Bellier (Switzerland) Luca Castelnuovo; 6–3, 7–6^{(7–5)} | (Chinese Taipei) Ray Ho (Australia) Matthew Romios | (China) Bu Yunchaokete; Evgeny Donskoy | (Australia) Christopher O'Connell (Australia) Dane Sweeny (Australia) Omar Jasika (Australia) Li Tu |
| September 11 | Santa Cruz Challenger; Santa Cruz de la Sierra, Bolivia; Clay – Challenger 75 – 32S/24Q/16D; Singles – Doubles | (Argentina) Mariano Navone; 4–6, 7–5, 6–1 | (Argentina) Francisco Comesaña | (Argentina) Juan Manuel Cerúndolo (Argentina) Andrea Collarini | (Brazil) Pedro Sakamoto (Argentina) Thiago Agustín Tirante (Argentina) Facundo Mena (Argentina) Genaro Alberto Olivieri |
| September 11 | Santa Cruz Challenger; Santa Cruz de la Sierra, Bolivia; Clay – Challenger 75 – 32S/24Q/16D; Singles – Doubles | (Bolivia) Boris Arias (Bolivia) Federico Zeballos; 6–2, 4–6, [10–7] | (Chile) Matías Soto (Argentina) Gonzalo Villanueva | (Argentina) Juan Manuel Cerúndolo (Argentina) Andrea Collarini | (Brazil) Pedro Sakamoto (Argentina) Thiago Agustín Tirante (Argentina) Facundo Mena (Argentina) Genaro Alberto Olivieri |
| September 18 | Layjet Open; Bad Waltersdorf, Austria; Clay – Challenger 125 – 32S/24Q/16D; Singles – Doubles | (Italy) Andrea Pellegrino; 1–6, 7–6^{(7–5)}, 6–3 | (Austria) Dennis Novak | (Spain) Albert Ramos Viñolas (Czech Republic) Vít Kopřiva | (Slovakia) Jozef Kovalík (Austria) Filip Misolic (United Kingdom) Jan Choinski (Germany) Marvin Möller |
| September 18 | Layjet Open; Bad Waltersdorf, Austria; Clay – Challenger 125 – 32S/24Q/16D; Singles – Doubles | (Germany) Constantin Frantzen (Germany) Hendrik Jebens; 6–1, 6–2 | (Italy) Marco Bortolotti (Italy) Francesco Passaro | (Spain) Albert Ramos Viñolas (Czech Republic) Vít Kopřiva | (Slovakia) Jozef Kovalík (Austria) Filip Misolic (United Kingdom) Jan Choinski (Germany) Marvin Möller |
| September 18 | Saint-Tropez Open; Saint-Tropez, France; Hard – Challenger 125 – 32S/24Q/16D; Singles – Doubles | (France) Constant Lestienne; 4–6, 6–3, 6–4 | (United Kingdom) Liam Broady | (Moldova) Radu Albot (United States) Michael Mmoh | (Netherlands) Gijs Brouwer (France) Arthur Cazaux (Italy) Giulio Zeppieri (Austria) Sebastian Ofner |
| September 18 | Saint-Tropez Open; Saint-Tropez, France; Hard – Challenger 125 – 32S/24Q/16D; Singles – Doubles | (France) Dan Added (France) Albano Olivetti; 3–6, 1–0 ret. | (France) Jonathan Eysseric (France) Harold Mayot | (Moldova) Radu Albot (United States) Michael Mmoh | (Netherlands) Gijs Brouwer (France) Arthur Cazaux (Italy) Giulio Zeppieri (Austria) Sebastian Ofner |
| September 18 | Antofagasta Challenger; Antofagasta, Chile; Clay – Challenger 100 – 32S/24Q/16D; Singles – Doubles | (Argentina) Camilo Ugo Carabelli; 3–6, 6–1, 7–5 | (United States) Tristan Boyer | (Argentina) Román Andrés Burruchaga (Italy) Luciano Darderi | (Brazil) Matheus Pucinelli de Almeida (Argentina) Francisco Comesaña (Brazil) João Lucas Reis da Silva (Chile) Gonzalo Lama |
| September 18 | Antofagasta Challenger; Antofagasta, Chile; Clay – Challenger 100 – 32S/24Q/16D; Singles – Doubles | (Bolivia) Boris Arias (Bolivia) Federico Zeballos; 5–7, 6–4, [10–8] | (Italy) Luciano Darderi (Bolivia) Murkel Dellien | (Argentina) Román Andrés Burruchaga (Italy) Luciano Darderi | (Brazil) Matheus Pucinelli de Almeida (Argentina) Francisco Comesaña (Brazil) João Lucas Reis da Silva (Chile) Gonzalo Lama |
| September 18 | Columbus Challenger; Columbus, United States; Hard (i) – Challenger 75 – 32S/24Q/16D; Singles – Doubles | (United States) Denis Kudla; 6–2, 6–1 | (Canada) Alexis Galarneau | (United States) Cannon Kingsley (United Kingdom) Ryan Peniston | (France) Enzo Couacaud (United States) Christian Harrison (Canada) Vasek Pospisil (Australia) Tristan Schoolkate |
| September 18 | Columbus Challenger; Columbus, United States; Hard (i) – Challenger 75 – 32S/24Q/16D; Singles – Doubles | (United States) Robert Cash (Japan) James Trotter; 6–4, 2–6, [10–7] | (Argentina) Guido Andreozzi (Mexico) Hans Hach Verdugo | (United States) Cannon Kingsley (United Kingdom) Ryan Peniston | (France) Enzo Couacaud (United States) Christian Harrison (Canada) Vasek Pospisil (Australia) Tristan Schoolkate |
| September 18 | Sibiu Open; Sibiu, Romania; Clay – Challenger 75 – 32S/24Q/16D; Singles – Doubles | (Bosnia and Herzegovina) Nerman Fatić; 6–2, 6–4 | (Bosnia and Herzegovina) Damir Džumhur | (Hungary) Zsombor Piros (Italy) Flavio Cobolli | (France) Calvin Hemery; Ivan Gakhov (Italy) Stefano Travaglia (Croatia) Duje Ajduković |
| September 18 | Sibiu Open; Sibiu, Romania; Clay – Challenger 75 – 32S/24Q/16D; Singles – Doubles | (Czech Republic) Andrew Paulson (Czech Republic) Michael Vrbenský; 6–2, 6–2 | (Poland) Piotr Matuszewski (Germany) Kai Wehnelt | (Hungary) Zsombor Piros (Italy) Flavio Cobolli | (France) Calvin Hemery; Ivan Gakhov (Italy) Stefano Travaglia (Croatia) Duje Ajduković |
| September 25 | Open Bogotá; Bogotá, Colombia; Clay – Challenger 125 – 32S/24Q/16D; Singles – Doubles | (Argentina) Thiago Agustín Tirante; Walkover | (Brazil) Gustavo Heide | (Chile) Tomás Barrios Vera (Spain) David Jordà Sanchis | (Argentina) Renzo Olivo (Bolivia) Murkel Dellien (Brazil) Matheus Pucinelli de Almeida (Chile) Alejandro Tabilo |
| September 25 | Open Bogotá; Bogotá, Colombia; Clay – Challenger 125 – 32S/24Q/16D; Singles – Doubles | (Argentina) Renzo Olivo (Argentina) Thiago Agustín Tirante; 7–6^{(8–6)}, 6–4 | (Argentina) Guillermo Durán (Brazil) Orlando Luz | (Chile) Tomás Barrios Vera (Spain) David Jordà Sanchis | (Argentina) Renzo Olivo (Bolivia) Murkel Dellien (Brazil) Matheus Pucinelli de Almeida (Chile) Alejandro Tabilo |
| September 25 | Open d'Orléans; Orléans, France; Hard (i) – Challenger 125 – 32S/24Q/16D; Singles – Doubles | (Czech Republic) Tomáš Macháč; 6–4, 4–6, 6–3 | (United Kingdom) Jack Draper | (France) Richard Gasquet (France) Luca Van Assche | (United Kingdom) Arthur Fery (France) Benjamin Bonzi (Netherlands) Gijs Brouwer (Belgium) David Goffin |
| September 25 | Open d'Orléans; Orléans, France; Hard (i) – Challenger 125 – 32S/24Q/16D; Singles – Doubles | (Germany) Constantin Frantzen (Germany) Hendrik Jebens; 7–6^{(7–5)}, 7–6^{(14–12)} | (United Kingdom) Henry Patten (Australia) John-Patrick Smith | (France) Richard Gasquet (France) Luca Van Assche | (United Kingdom) Arthur Fery (France) Benjamin Bonzi (Netherlands) Gijs Brouwer (Belgium) David Goffin |
| September 25 | Braga Open; Braga, Portugal; Clay – Challenger 75 – 32S/24Q/16D; Singles – Doubles | (Spain) Oriol Roca Batalla; 4–6, 6–1, 6–1 | (Croatia) Duje Ajduković | (Hungary) Máté Valkusz (Lebanon) Benjamin Hassan | (France) Titouan Droguet (France) Geoffrey Blancaneaux (Spain) Pablo Llamas Ruiz (Portugal) Jaime Faria |
| September 25 | Braga Open; Braga, Portugal; Clay – Challenger 75 – 32S/24Q/16D; Singles – Doubles | (Italy) Marco Bortolotti (Romania) Alexandru Jecan; 7–5, 7–5 | (Italy) Stefano Travaglia (Italy) Alexander Weis | (Hungary) Máté Valkusz (Lebanon) Benjamin Hassan | (France) Titouan Droguet (France) Geoffrey Blancaneaux (Spain) Pablo Llamas Ruiz (Portugal) Jaime Faria |
| September 25 | LTP Men's Open; Charleston, United States; Hard – Challenger 75 – 32S/24Q/16D; Singles – Doubles | (Jordan) Abdullah Shelbayh; 6–2, 6–7^{(5–7)}, 6–3 | (United States) Oliver Crawford | (Mexico) Ernesto Escobedo (United Kingdom) Ryan Peniston | (United States) Denis Kudla (United States) Stefan Dostanic (United States) Ethan Quinn (Australia) Adam Walton |
| September 25 | LTP Men's Open; Charleston, United States; Hard – Challenger 75 – 32S/24Q/16D; Singles – Doubles | (United Kingdom) Luke Johnson (Tunisia) Skander Mansouri; 6–4, 6–4 | (United States) Nicholas Bybel (United States) Oliver Crawford | (Mexico) Ernesto Escobedo (United Kingdom) Ryan Peniston | (United States) Denis Kudla (United States) Stefan Dostanic (United States) Ethan Quinn (Australia) Adam Walton |

=== October ===
| Week of | Tournament | Champions | Runners-up | Semifinalists | Quarterfinalists |
|---|---|---|---|---|---|
| October 2 | JC Ferrero Challenger Open; Alicante, Spain; Hard – Challenger 100 – 32S/24Q/16D; Singles – Doubles | (France) Constant Lestienne; 6–7^{(10–12)}, 6–2, 6–4 | (France) Hugo Grenier | (Germany) Maximilian Marterer (Austria) Dennis Novak | (Spain) Martín Landaluce (United States) Martin Damm (United Kingdom) Billy Harris (Sweden) Elias Ymer |
| October 2 | JC Ferrero Challenger Open; Alicante, Spain; Hard – Challenger 100 – 32S/24Q/16D; Singles – Doubles | (India) Niki Kaliyanda Poonacha (India) Divij Sharan; 6–4, 3–6, [10–7] | (India) Jeevan Nedunchezhiyan (Australia) John-Patrick Smith | (Germany) Maximilian Marterer (Austria) Dennis Novak | (Spain) Martín Landaluce (United States) Martin Damm (United Kingdom) Billy Harris (Sweden) Elias Ymer |
| October 2 | Campeonato Internacional de Tênis de Campinas; Campinas, Brazil; Clay – Challenger 100 – 32S/24Q/16D; Singles – Doubles | (Brazil) Thiago Monteiro; 3–6, 6–4, 6–4 | (Argentina) Camilo Ugo Carabelli | (Italy) Andrea Pellegrino (Italy) Luciano Darderi | (Brazil) Orlando Luz (Brazil) José Pereira (Bolivia) Hugo Dellien (Argentina) Román Andrés Burruchaga |
| October 2 | Campeonato Internacional de Tênis de Campinas; Campinas, Brazil; Clay – Challenger 100 – 32S/24Q/16D; Singles – Doubles | (Argentina) Guido Andreozzi (Argentina) Guillermo Durán; 7–6^{(7–4)}, 6–3 | (Ecuador) Diego Hidalgo (Colombia) Cristian Rodríguez | (Italy) Andrea Pellegrino (Italy) Luciano Darderi | (Brazil) Orlando Luz (Brazil) José Pereira (Bolivia) Hugo Dellien (Argentina) Román Andrés Burruchaga |
| October 2 | Open de Vendée; Mouilleron-le-Captif, France; Hard (i) – Challenger 100 – 32S/24Q/16D; Singles – Doubles | (Czech Republic) Tomáš Macháč; 6–3, 6–4 | (United Kingdom) Arthur Fery | (France) Antoine Escoffier (France) Lucas Poullain | (France) Hugo Gaston (Italy) Giulio Zeppieri (Italy) Luca Nardi (United Kingdom) Jack Draper |
| October 2 | Open de Vendée; Mouilleron-le-Captif, France; Hard (i) – Challenger 100 – 32S/24Q/16D; Singles – Doubles | (United Kingdom) Julian Cash (United States) Robert Galloway; 6–4, 5–7, [12–10] | (United States) Maxime Cressy (Finland) Otto Virtanen | (France) Antoine Escoffier (France) Lucas Poullain | (France) Hugo Gaston (Italy) Giulio Zeppieri (Italy) Luca Nardi (United Kingdom) Jack Draper |
| October 2 | Lisboa Belém Open; Lisbon, Portugal; Clay – Challenger 75 – 32S/24Q/16D; Singles – Doubles | (Italy) Flavio Cobolli; 7–5, 7–5 | (Lebanon) Benjamin Hassan | (Spain) Albert Ramos Viñolas (Italy) Franco Agamenone | (Portugal) João Sousa (Spain) Oriol Roca Batalla (Italy) Riccardo Bonadio (France) Calvin Hemery |
| October 2 | Lisboa Belém Open; Lisbon, Portugal; Clay – Challenger 75 – 32S/24Q/16D; Singles – Doubles | (Poland) Karol Drzewiecki (Czech Republic) Zdeněk Kolář; 6–2, 7–6^{(7–5)} | (Portugal) Jaime Faria (Portugal) Henrique Rocha | (Spain) Albert Ramos Viñolas (Italy) Franco Agamenone | (Portugal) João Sousa (Spain) Oriol Roca Batalla (Italy) Riccardo Bonadio (France) Calvin Hemery |
| October 2 | Tiburon Challenger; Tiburon, United States; Hard – Challenger 75 – 32S/24Q/16D; Singles – Doubles | (United States) Zachary Svajda; 6–2, 6–2 | (Australia) Adam Walton | (Australia) Tristan Schoolkate (Canada) Alexis Galarneau | (United States) Thai-Son Kwiatkowski (Australia) Bernard Tomic (United States) Nishesh Basavareddy (Switzerland) Alexander Ritschard |
| October 2 | Tiburon Challenger; Tiburon, United States; Hard – Challenger 75 – 32S/24Q/16D; Singles – Doubles | (United Kingdom) Luke Johnson (Tunisia) Skander Mansouri; 6–2, 6–3 | (United States) William Blumberg (Venezuela) Luis David Martínez | (Australia) Tristan Schoolkate (Canada) Alexis Galarneau | (United States) Thai-Son Kwiatkowski (Australia) Bernard Tomic (United States) Nishesh Basavareddy (Switzerland) Alexander Ritschard |
| October 9 | Slovak Open; Bratislava, Slovakia; Hard (i) – Challenger 125 – 32S/24Q/16D; Singles – Doubles | (Canada) Gabriel Diallo; 6–0, 7–5 | (Belgium) Joris De Loore | (United States) Martin Damm (Italy) Luca Nardi | (Slovakia) Lukáš Klein (United States) Maxime Cressy (Ukraine) Illya Marchenko (Bosnia and Herzegovina) Damir Džumhur |
| October 9 | Slovak Open; Bratislava, Slovakia; Hard (i) – Challenger 125 – 32S/24Q/16D; Singles – Doubles | (India) Sriram Balaji (Germany) Andre Begemann; 6–3, 5–7, [10–8] | (Kazakhstan) Andrey Golubev (Ukraine) Denys Molchanov | (United States) Martin Damm (Italy) Luca Nardi | (Slovakia) Lukáš Klein (United States) Maxime Cressy (Ukraine) Illya Marchenko (Bosnia and Herzegovina) Damir Džumhur |
| October 9 | Málaga Open; Málaga, Spain; Hard – Challenger 125 – 32S/24Q/16D; Singles – Doubles | (France) Ugo Blanchet; 6–4, 6–4 | (Italy) Mattia Bellucci | (France) Maxime Janvier (United States) Emilio Nava | (United Kingdom) Billy Harris (Italy) Flavio Cobolli (Spain) Alejandro Moro Cañas (Italy) Andrea Vavassori |
| October 9 | Málaga Open; Málaga, Spain; Hard – Challenger 125 – 32S/24Q/16D; Singles – Doubles | (United Kingdom) Julian Cash (United States) Robert Galloway; 7–5, 6–2 | (Australia) Andrew Harris (Australia) John-Patrick Smith | (France) Maxime Janvier (United States) Emilio Nava | (United Kingdom) Billy Harris (Italy) Flavio Cobolli (Spain) Alejandro Moro Cañas (Italy) Andrea Vavassori |
| October 9 | Challenger de Buenos Aires; Buenos Aires, Argentina; Clay – Challenger 100 – 32S/24Q/16D; Singles – Doubles | (Argentina) Mariano Navone; 2–6, 6–3, 6–4 | (Argentina) Federico Coria | (Argentina) Facundo Díaz Acosta (Italy) Luciano Darderi | (United Kingdom) Jan Choinski (Argentina) Francisco Comesaña (Italy) Franco Agamenone (Argentina) Juan Manuel Cerúndolo |
| October 9 | Challenger de Buenos Aires; Buenos Aires, Argentina; Clay – Challenger 100 – 32S/24Q/16D; Singles – Doubles | (Ecuador) Diego Hidalgo (Colombia) Cristian Rodríguez; 6–3, 6–2 | (Brazil) Fernando Romboli (Brazil) Marcelo Zormann | (Argentina) Facundo Díaz Acosta (Italy) Luciano Darderi | (United Kingdom) Jan Choinski (Argentina) Francisco Comesaña (Italy) Franco Agamenone (Argentina) Juan Manuel Cerúndolo |
| October 9 | Shenzhen Longhua Open; Shenzhen, China; Hard – Challenger 100 – 32S/24Q/16D; Singles – Doubles | (United States) Aleksandar Kovacevic; 7–6^{(7–4)}, 7–6^{(7–5)} | (Portugal) Nuno Borges | Egor Gerasimov (Argentina) Pedro Cachin | (Kazakhstan) Beibit Zhukayev (Chinese Taipei) Hsu Yu-hsiou (Kazakhstan) Denis Yevseyev (Chinese Taipei) Jason Jung |
| October 9 | Shenzhen Longhua Open; Shenzhen, China; Hard – Challenger 100 – 32S/24Q/16D; Singles – Doubles | (Austria) Alexander Erler (Austria) Lucas Miedler; 6–3, 6–4 | (Poland) Piotr Matuszewski (Australia) Matthew Romios | Egor Gerasimov (Argentina) Pedro Cachin | (Kazakhstan) Beibit Zhukayev (Chinese Taipei) Hsu Yu-hsiou (Kazakhstan) Denis Yevseyev (Chinese Taipei) Jason Jung |
| October 9 | Fairfield Challenger; Fairfield, United States; Hard – Challenger 75 – 32S/24Q/16D; Singles – Doubles | (United States) Zachary Svajda; 6–4, 6–1 | (United States) Nishesh Basavareddy | (United States) Steve Johnson (Switzerland) Alexander Ritschard | (United States) Alex Michelsen (United States) Christian Harrison (United States) Brandon Holt (United States) Mitchell Krueger |
| October 9 | Fairfield Challenger; Fairfield, United States; Hard – Challenger 75 – 32S/24Q/16D; Singles – Doubles | (United States) Evan King (United States) Reese Stalder; 7–5, 6–3 | (United States) Vasil Kirkov (United States) Denis Kudla | (United States) Steve Johnson (Switzerland) Alexander Ritschard | (United States) Alex Michelsen (United States) Christian Harrison (United States) Brandon Holt (United States) Mitchell Krueger |
| October 16 | Olbia Challenger; Olbia, Italy; Hard – Challenger 125 – 32S/24Q/16D; Singles – Doubles | (France) Kyrian Jacquet; 6–3, 6–4 | (Italy) Flavio Cobolli | (Belgium) Joris De Loore (Slovakia) Alex Molčan | (France) Ugo Blanchet (Italy) Francesco Forti (Italy) Mattia Bellucci (France) Constant Lestienne |
| October 16 | Olbia Challenger; Olbia, Italy; Hard – Challenger 125 – 32S/24Q/16D; Singles – Doubles | (India) Rithvik Choudary Bollipalli (India) Arjun Kadhe; 6–1, 6–3 | (Serbia) Ivan Sabanov (Serbia) Matej Sabanov | (Belgium) Joris De Loore (Slovakia) Alex Molčan | (France) Ugo Blanchet (Italy) Francesco Forti (Italy) Mattia Bellucci (France) Constant Lestienne |
| October 16 | Challenger Santa Fe II; Santa Fe, Argentina; Clay – Challenger 75 – 32S/24Q/16D; Singles – Doubles | (Argentina) Mariano Navone; 3–6, 6–2, 6–3 | (Italy) Andrea Pellegrino | (Czech Republic) Vít Kopřiva (Brazil) Thiago Monteiro | (Argentina) Federico Coria (Argentina) Federico Delbonis (Chile) Tomás Barrios Vera (Argentina) Facundo Bagnis |
| October 16 | Challenger Santa Fe II; Santa Fe, Argentina; Clay – Challenger 75 – 32S/24Q/16D; Singles – Doubles | (Switzerland) Luca Margaroli (Argentina) Santiago Rodríguez Taverna; 7–6^{(7–2)}, 6–4 | (Italy) Franco Agamenone (Argentina) Mariano Kestelboim | (Czech Republic) Vít Kopřiva (Brazil) Thiago Monteiro | (Argentina) Federico Coria (Argentina) Federico Delbonis (Chile) Tomás Barrios Vera (Argentina) Facundo Bagnis |
| October 16 | Shenzhen Luohu Challenger; Shenzhen, China; Hard – Challenger 75 – 32S/24Q/16D; Singles – Doubles | (Australia) James Duckworth; 6–0, 6–1 | (Hong Kong) Coleman Wong | (China) Bu Yunchaokete (United States) Aleksandar Kovacevic | (Australia) Li Tu (China) Bai Yan (Chinese Taipei) Huang Tsung-hao (Italy) Lorenzo Giustino |
| October 16 | Shenzhen Luohu Challenger; Shenzhen, China; Hard – Challenger 75 – 32S/24Q/16D; Singles – Doubles | (China) Gao Xin (China) Wang Aoran; 6–4, 6–2 | Mikalai Haliak (Greece) Markos Kalovelonis | (China) Bu Yunchaokete (United States) Aleksandar Kovacevic | (Australia) Li Tu (China) Bai Yan (Chinese Taipei) Huang Tsung-hao (Italy) Lorenzo Giustino |
| October 16 | Hamburg Ladies & Gents Cup; Hamburg, Germany; Hard (i) – Challenger 50 – 32S/24Q/16D; Singles – Doubles | (Ukraine) Illya Marchenko; 6–2, 6–3 | (Austria) Dennis Novak | (France) Tristan Lamasine (United Kingdom) Billy Harris | (Spain) Javier Barranco Cosano (Australia) Akira Santillan (Hungary) Máté Valkusz (Australia) Adam Walton |
| October 16 | Hamburg Ladies & Gents Cup; Hamburg, Germany; Hard (i) – Challenger 50 – 32S/24Q/16D; Singles – Doubles | (Austria) Dennis Novak (Australia) Akira Santillan; 6–4, 3–6, [10–3] | (Romania) Alexandru Jecan (Netherlands) Mick Veldheer | (France) Tristan Lamasine (United Kingdom) Billy Harris | (Spain) Javier Barranco Cosano (Australia) Akira Santillan (Hungary) Máté Valkusz (Australia) Adam Walton |
| October 23 | Brest Challenger; Brest, France; Hard (i) – Challenger 100 – 32S/24Q/16D; Singles – Doubles | (Spain) Pedro Martínez; 7–6^{(8–6)}, 7–6^{(7–1)} | (France) Benjamin Bonzi | (France) Hugo Gaston (France) Constant Lestienne | (France) Arthur Cazaux (United Kingdom) Arthur Fery (Hungary) Zsombor Piros (France) Titouan Droguet |
| October 23 | Brest Challenger; Brest, France; Hard (i) – Challenger 100 – 32S/24Q/16D; Singles – Doubles | (India) Yuki Bhambri (United Kingdom) Julian Cash; 6–7^{(5–7)}, 6–3, [10–5] | (United States) Robert Galloway (France) Albano Olivetti | (France) Hugo Gaston (France) Constant Lestienne | (France) Arthur Cazaux (United Kingdom) Arthur Fery (Hungary) Zsombor Piros (France) Titouan Droguet |
| October 23 | Curitiba Challenger; Curitiba, Brazil; Clay – Challenger 75 – 32S/24Q/16D; Singles – Doubles | (Bolivia) Hugo Dellien; 7–6^{(8–6)}, 4–6, 7–6^{(7–1)} | (United States) Oliver Crawford | (Argentina) Guido Andreozzi (Italy) Luciano Darderi | (Argentina) Santiago Rodríguez Taverna (Argentina) Román Andrés Burruchaga (Brazil) Orlando Luz (Czech Republic) Dalibor Svrčina |
| October 23 | Curitiba Challenger; Curitiba, Brazil; Clay – Challenger 75 – 32S/24Q/16D; Singles – Doubles | (Argentina) Guido Andreozzi (Uruguay) Ignacio Carou; 6–4, 6–4 | (Ecuador) Diego Hidalgo (Colombia) Cristian Rodríguez | (Argentina) Guido Andreozzi (Italy) Luciano Darderi | (Argentina) Santiago Rodríguez Taverna (Argentina) Román Andrés Burruchaga (Brazil) Orlando Luz (Czech Republic) Dalibor Svrčina |
| October 23 | City of Playford Tennis International; Playford, Australia; Hard – Challenger 75 – 32S/24Q/16D; Singles – Doubles | (Australia) James Duckworth; 7–5, 7–5 | (Hong Kong) Coleman Wong | (Japan) Taro Daniel (Australia) Rinky Hijikata | (Australia) Tristan Schoolkate (Japan) Yuta Shimizu (Japan) Hiroki Moriya (South Korea) Hong Seong-chan |
| October 23 | City of Playford Tennis International; Playford, Australia; Hard – Challenger 75 – 32S/24Q/16D; Singles – Doubles | (United States) Ryan Seggerman (United States) Patrik Trhac; 6–3, 7–6^{(7–3)} | (Australia) Blake Ellis (Australia) Tristan Schoolkate | (Japan) Taro Daniel (Australia) Rinky Hijikata | (Australia) Tristan Schoolkate (Japan) Yuta Shimizu (Japan) Hiroki Moriya (South Korea) Hong Seong-chan |
| October 23 | Sparkassen ATP Challenger; Ortisei, Italy; Hard (i) – Challenger 50 – 32S/24Q/16D; Singles – Doubles | (Slovakia) Lukáš Klein; 6–7^{(4–7)}, 7–6^{(7–4)}, 7–6^{(8–6)} | (Poland) Maks Kaśnikowski | (United Kingdom) Billy Harris (Italy) Federico Gaio | (Italy) Enrico Dalla Valle (Estonia) Daniil Glinka (Italy) Luca Giacomini (France) Mathias Bourgue |
| October 23 | Sparkassen ATP Challenger; Ortisei, Italy; Hard (i) – Challenger 50 – 32S/24Q/16D; Singles – Doubles | (Czech Republic) Andrew Paulson (Czech Republic) Patrik Rikl; 4–6, 7–6^{(9–7)}, [11–9] | (Austria) Maximilian Neuchrist (Switzerland) Jakub Paul | (United Kingdom) Billy Harris (Italy) Federico Gaio | (Italy) Enrico Dalla Valle (Estonia) Daniil Glinka (Italy) Luca Giacomini (France) Mathias Bourgue |
| October 30 | Trofeo Faip–Perrel; Bergamo, Italy; Hard (i) – Challenger 75 – 32S/24Q/16D; Singles – Doubles | (United Kingdom) Jack Draper; 1–6, 7–6^{(7–3)}, 6–3 | (Belgium) David Goffin | (United States) Brandon Nakashima (Estonia) Mark Lajal | (United Kingdom) Billy Harris (Italy) Fabio Fognini (Slovakia) Alex Molčan (France) Pierre-Hugues Herbert |
| October 30 | Trofeo Faip–Perrel; Bergamo, Italy; Hard (i) – Challenger 75 – 32S/24Q/16D; Singles – Doubles | (United States) Evan King (United States) Brandon Nakashima; 6–4, 7–6^{(7–1)} | (Portugal) Francisco Cabral (United Kingdom) Henry Patten | (United States) Brandon Nakashima (Estonia) Mark Lajal | (United Kingdom) Billy Harris (Italy) Fabio Fognini (Slovakia) Alex Molčan (France) Pierre-Hugues Herbert |
| October 30 | Charlottesville Men's Pro Challenger; Charlottesville, United States; Hard (i) – Challenger 75 – 32S/24Q/16D; Singles – Doubles | (Kazakhstan) Beibit Zhukayev; 6–3, 6–4 | (United States) Aidan Mayo | (United States) Ethan Quinn (United States) Patrick Kypson | (Switzerland) Alexander Ritschard (France) Benoît Paire (Croatia) Nino Serdarušić (United States) Brandon Holt |
| October 30 | Charlottesville Men's Pro Challenger; Charlottesville, United States; Hard (i) – Challenger 75 – 32S/24Q/16D; Singles – Doubles | (Australia) John-Patrick Smith (Netherlands) Sem Verbeek; 3–6, 6–3, [10–5] | (United States) Denis Kudla (United States) Thai-Son Kwiatkowski | (United States) Ethan Quinn (United States) Patrick Kypson | (Switzerland) Alexander Ritschard (France) Benoît Paire (Croatia) Nino Serdarušić (United States) Brandon Holt |
| October 30 | Challenger Ciudad de Guayaquil; Guayaquil, Ecuador; Clay – Challenger 75 – 32S/24Q/16D; Singles – Doubles | (Chile) Alejandro Tabilo; 6–2, 6–2 | (Colombia) Daniel Elahi Galán | (Argentina) Román Andrés Burruchaga (Brazil) Felipe Meligeni Alves | (Argentina) Federico Coria (Argentina) Camilo Ugo Carabelli (Argentina) Facundo Díaz Acosta (Bolivia) Hugo Dellien |
| October 30 | Challenger Ciudad de Guayaquil; Guayaquil, Ecuador; Clay – Challenger 75 – 32S/24Q/16D; Singles – Doubles | (Peru) Arklon Huertas del Pino (Peru) Conner Huertas del Pino; 6–3, 6–1 | (Switzerland) Luca Margaroli (Argentina) Santiago Rodríguez Taverna | (Argentina) Román Andrés Burruchaga (Brazil) Felipe Meligeni Alves | (Argentina) Federico Coria (Argentina) Camilo Ugo Carabelli (Argentina) Facundo Díaz Acosta (Bolivia) Hugo Dellien |
| October 30 | Wolffkran Open; Ismaning, Germany; Carpet (i) – Challenger 75 – 32S/24Q/16D; Singles – Doubles | (Switzerland) Antoine Bellier; 7–6^{(7–5)}, 6–7^{(5–7)}, 7–6^{(8–6)} | (Germany) Maximilian Marterer | (Germany) Rudolf Molleker (Slovakia) Lukáš Klein | Alibek Kachmazov (Switzerland) Marc-Andrea Hüsler (Germany) Max Hans Rehberg (Czech Republic) Andrew Paulson |
| October 30 | Wolffkran Open; Ismaning, Germany; Carpet (i) – Challenger 75 – 32S/24Q/16D; Singles – Doubles | (India) Sriram Balaji (Germany) Andre Begemann; 7–6^{(7–4)}, 6–4 | (Germany) Constantin Frantzen (Germany) Hendrik Jebens | (Germany) Rudolf Molleker (Slovakia) Lukáš Klein | Alibek Kachmazov (Switzerland) Marc-Andrea Hüsler (Germany) Max Hans Rehberg (Czech Republic) Andrew Paulson |
| October 30 | NSW Open; Sydney, Australia; Hard – Challenger 75 – 32S/24Q/16D; Singles – Doubles | (Japan) Taro Daniel; 6–2, 6–4 | (Australia) Marc Polmans | (Australia) Thanasi Kokkinakis (Australia) Rinky Hijikata | (Japan) Rio Noguchi (Australia) Blake Mott (Japan) Shintaro Mochizuki (South Korea) Nam Ji-sung |
| October 30 | NSW Open; Sydney, Australia; Hard – Challenger 75 – 32S/24Q/16D; Singles – Doubles | (United States) Ryan Seggerman (United States) Patrik Trhac; 6–4, 6–4 | (Philippines) Ruben Gonzales (South Korea) Nam Ji-sung | (Australia) Thanasi Kokkinakis (Australia) Rinky Hijikata | (Japan) Rio Noguchi (Australia) Blake Mott (Japan) Shintaro Mochizuki (South Korea) Nam Ji-sung |

=== November ===
| Week of | Tournament | Champions | Runners-up | Semifinalists | Quarterfinalists |
|---|---|---|---|---|---|
| November 6 | HPP Open; Helsinki, Finland; Hard (i) – Challenger 125 – 32S/24Q/16D; Singles – Doubles | (France) Corentin Moutet; 6–3, 3–6, 6–2 | (India) Sumit Nagal | (France) Arthur Rinderknech (Italy) Stefano Travaglia | (Spain) Jaume Munar (France) Alexandre Müller (Moldova) Radu Albot (Finland) Emil Ruusuvuori |
| November 6 | HPP Open; Helsinki, Finland; Hard (i) – Challenger 125 – 32S/24Q/16D; Singles – Doubles | (India) Sriram Balaji (Germany) Andre Begemann; 6–2, 7–5 | (India) Jeevan Nedunchezhiyan (India) Vijay Sundar Prashanth | (France) Arthur Rinderknech (Italy) Stefano Travaglia | (Spain) Jaume Munar (France) Alexandre Müller (Moldova) Radu Albot (Finland) Emil Ruusuvuori |
| November 6 | Calgary National Bank Challenger; Calgary, Canada; Hard (i) – Challenger 75 – 32S/24Q/16D; Singles – Doubles | (Canada) Liam Draxl; 6–4, 6–3 | (Germany) Dominik Koepfer | (Canada) Gabriel Diallo (United States) Andres Martin | (Belgium) Zizou Bergs (Tunisia) Aziz Dougaz (France) Enzo Wallart (Spain) Iñaki Montes de la Torre |
| November 6 | Calgary National Bank Challenger; Calgary, Canada; Hard (i) – Challenger 75 – 32S/24Q/16D; Singles – Doubles | (Canada) Juan Carlos Aguilar (Canada) Justin Boulais; 6–3, 6–2 | (United Kingdom) Charles Broom (United Kingdom) Ben Jones | (Canada) Gabriel Diallo (United States) Andres Martin | (Belgium) Zizou Bergs (Tunisia) Aziz Dougaz (France) Enzo Wallart (Spain) Iñaki Montes de la Torre |
| November 6 | Knoxville Challenger; Knoxville, United States; Hard (i) – Challenger 75 – 32S/24Q/16D; Singles – Doubles | (United States) Alex Michelsen; 7–5, 4–6, 6–2 | (United States) Denis Kudla | (United States) Emilio Nava (United States) Tennys Sandgren | (United Kingdom) Aidan McHugh (United States) Zachary Svajda (United States) Nishesh Basavareddy (Switzerland) Alexander Ritschard |
| November 6 | Knoxville Challenger; Knoxville, United States; Hard (i) – Challenger 75 – 32S/24Q/16D; Singles – Doubles | (United States) Cannon Kingsley (Venezuela) Luis David Martínez; 7–6^{(7–3)}, 6–3 | (United States) Mac Kiger (United States) Mitchell Krueger | (United States) Emilio Nava (United States) Tennys Sandgren | (United Kingdom) Aidan McHugh (United States) Zachary Svajda (United States) Nishesh Basavareddy (Switzerland) Alexander Ritschard |
| November 6 | Lima Challenger II; Lima, Peru; Clay – Challenger 75 – 32S/24Q/16D; Singles – Doubles | (Italy) Luciano Darderi; 4–6, 6–3, 7–5 | (Argentina) Mariano Navone | (Chile) Alejandro Tabilo (Argentina) Francisco Comesaña | (Peru) Juan Pablo Varillas (Argentina) Román Andrés Burruchaga (Colombia) Daniel Elahi Galán (Argentina) Guido Andreozzi |
| November 6 | Lima Challenger II; Lima, Peru; Clay – Challenger 75 – 32S/24Q/16D; Singles – Doubles | (Brazil) Mateus Alves (Brazil) Eduardo Ribeiro; 3–6, 7–5, [10–8] | (Colombia) Nicolás Barrientos (Brazil) Orlando Luz | (Chile) Alejandro Tabilo (Argentina) Francisco Comesaña | (Peru) Juan Pablo Varillas (Argentina) Román Andrés Burruchaga (Colombia) Daniel Elahi Galán (Argentina) Guido Andreozzi |
| November 6 | Matsuyama Challenger; Matsuyama, Japan; Hard – Challenger 75 – 32S/24Q/16D; Singles – Doubles | (Italy) Luca Nardi; 3–6, 6–4, 6–2 | (Japan) Taro Daniel | (Denmark) August Holmgren (France) Geoffrey Blancaneaux | (Chinese Taipei) Hsu Yu-hsiou (Croatia) Duje Ajduković (China) Bu Yunchaokete (Germany) Benjamin Hassan |
| November 6 | Matsuyama Challenger; Matsuyama, Japan; Hard – Challenger 75 – 32S/24Q/16D; Singles – Doubles | (Poland) Karol Drzewiecki (Czech Republic) Zdeněk Kolář; 6–3, 6–2 | (Japan) Toshihide Matsui (Japan) Kaito Uesugi | (Denmark) August Holmgren (France) Geoffrey Blancaneaux | (Chinese Taipei) Hsu Yu-hsiou (Croatia) Duje Ajduković (China) Bu Yunchaokete (Germany) Benjamin Hassan |
| November 13 | Uruguay Open; Montevideo, Uruguay; Clay – Challenger 100 – 32S/24Q/16D; Singles – Doubles | (Argentina) Facundo Díaz Acosta; 6–3, 4–3 ret. | (Brazil) Thiago Monteiro | (Brazil) Gustavo Heide (Bolivia) Hugo Dellien | (Argentina) Facundo Bagnis (Argentina) Román Andrés Burruchaga (Chile) Tomás Barrios Vera (Argentina) Camilo Ugo Carabelli |
| November 13 | Uruguay Open; Montevideo, Uruguay; Clay – Challenger 100 – 32S/24Q/16D; Singles – Doubles | (Argentina) Guido Andreozzi (Argentina) Guillermo Durán; 2–6, 7–6^{(7–2)}, [10–8] | (Bolivia) Boris Arias (Bolivia) Federico Zeballos | (Brazil) Gustavo Heide (Bolivia) Hugo Dellien | (Argentina) Facundo Bagnis (Argentina) Román Andrés Burruchaga (Chile) Tomás Barrios Vera (Argentina) Camilo Ugo Carabelli |
| November 13 | Champaign–Urbana Challenger; Champaign, United States; Hard (i) – Challenger 75 – 32S/24Q/16D; Singles – Doubles | (United States) Patrick Kypson; 6–4, 6–3 | (United States) Alex Michelsen | (United States) Ethan Quinn (France) Titouan Droguet | (United States) Aleksandar Kovacevic (Croatia) Nino Serdarušić (United States) Mitchell Krueger (United States) Martin Damm |
| November 13 | Champaign–Urbana Challenger; Champaign, United States; Hard (i) – Challenger 75 – 32S/24Q/16D; Singles – Doubles | (Australia) John-Patrick Smith (Netherlands) Sem Verbeek; 6–2, 7–6^{(7–4)} | (United States) Lucas Horve (United Kingdom) Oliver Okonkwo | (United States) Ethan Quinn (France) Titouan Droguet | (United States) Aleksandar Kovacevic (Croatia) Nino Serdarušić (United States) Mitchell Krueger (United States) Martin Damm |
| November 13 | Good to Great Challenger; Danderyd, Sweden; Hard (i) – Challenger 75 – 32S/24Q/16D; Singles – Doubles | (Germany) Maximilian Marterer; 2–6, 6–4, 6–3 | (United States) Brandon Nakashima | (Belgium) Alexander Blockx (Italy) Flavio Cobolli | (Czech Republic) Jakub Menšík (Belgium) David Goffin (Moldova) Radu Albot (United States) Maxime Cressy |
| November 13 | Good to Great Challenger; Danderyd, Sweden; Hard (i) – Challenger 75 – 32S/24Q/16D; Singles – Doubles | (United Kingdom) Julian Cash (Netherlands) Bart Stevens; 6–7^{(7–9)}, 6–4, [10–7] | (India) Jeevan Nedunchezhiyan (India) Vijay Sundar Prashanth | (Belgium) Alexander Blockx (Italy) Flavio Cobolli | (Czech Republic) Jakub Menšík (Belgium) David Goffin (Moldova) Radu Albot (United States) Maxime Cressy |
| November 13 | Challenger Banque Nationale de Drummondville; Drummondville, Canada; Hard (i) – Challenger 75 – 32S/24Q/16D; Singles – Doubles | (Belgium) Zizou Bergs; 6–4, 7–5 | (Australia) James Duckworth | (Czech Republic) Michael Vrbenský (Australia) Li Tu | (Germany) Dominik Koepfer (Tunisia) Aziz Dougaz (Portugal) João Sousa (United Kingdom) Ryan Peniston |
| November 13 | Challenger Banque Nationale de Drummondville; Drummondville, Canada; Hard (i) – Challenger 75 – 32S/24Q/16D; Singles – Doubles | (Sweden) André Göransson (United Kingdom) Toby Samuel; 6–7^{(2–7)}, 6–3, [10–8] | (Canada) Liam Draxl (United Kingdom) Giles Hussey | (Czech Republic) Michael Vrbenský (Australia) Li Tu | (Germany) Dominik Koepfer (Tunisia) Aziz Dougaz (Portugal) João Sousa (United Kingdom) Ryan Peniston |
| November 13 | Kobe Challenger; Kobe, Japan; Hard (i) – Challenger 75 – 32S/24Q/16D; Singles – Doubles | (Croatia) Duje Ajduković; 6–4, 6–2 | (Japan) Sho Shimabukuro | (Chinese Taipei) Wu Tung-lin (Italy) Luca Nardi | (Austria) Jurij Rodionov (Chinese Taipei) Jason Jung (Australia) Marc Polmans (Japan) Shintaro Mochizuki |
| November 13 | Kobe Challenger; Kobe, Japan; Hard (i) – Challenger 75 – 32S/24Q/16D; Singles – Doubles | (United States) Evan King (United States) Reese Stalder; 7–6^{(7–3)}, 2–6, [10–7] | (Australia) Andrew Harris (South Korea) Nam Ji-sung | (Chinese Taipei) Wu Tung-lin (Italy) Luca Nardi | (Austria) Jurij Rodionov (Chinese Taipei) Jason Jung (Australia) Marc Polmans (Japan) Shintaro Mochizuki |
| November 20 | Aberto da República; Brasília, Brazil; Hard – Challenger 100 – 32S/24Q/16D; Singles – Doubles | (Chile) Alejandro Tabilo; 6–3, 7–6^{(8–6)} | (Argentina) Román Andrés Burruchaga | (Argentina) Santiago Rodríguez Taverna (Argentina) Juan Pablo Ficovich | (Chile) Cristian Garín (United States) Tristan Boyer (Australia) Bernard Tomic (Argentina) Thiago Agustín Tirante |
| November 20 | Aberto da República; Brasília, Brazil; Hard – Challenger 100 – 32S/24Q/16D; Singles – Doubles | (Colombia) Nicolás Barrientos (Sweden) André Göransson; 7–6^{(7–3)}, 4–6, [11–9] | (Brazil) Marcelo Demoliner (Brazil) Rafael Matos | (Argentina) Santiago Rodríguez Taverna (Argentina) Juan Pablo Ficovich | (Chile) Cristian Garín (United States) Tristan Boyer (Australia) Bernard Tomic (Argentina) Thiago Agustín Tirante |
| November 20 | Copa Faulcombridge; Valencia, Spain; Clay – Challenger 100 – 32S/24Q/16D; Singles – Doubles | (Italy) Fabio Fognini; 3–6, 7–6^{(10–8)}, 7–6^{(7–3)} | (Spain) Roberto Bautista Agut | (Kazakhstan) Denis Yevseyev (Spain) Albert Ramos Viñolas | (Spain) Alejandro Moro Cañas (Spain) Martín Landaluce (France) Hugo Gaston (France) Pierre-Hugues Herbert |
| November 20 | Copa Faulcombridge; Valencia, Spain; Clay – Challenger 100 – 32S/24Q/16D; Singles – Doubles | (Italy) Andrea Pellegrino (Italy) Andrea Vavassori; 6–2, 6–4 | (Spain) Daniel Rincón (Spain) Oriol Roca Batalla | (Kazakhstan) Denis Yevseyev (Spain) Albert Ramos Viñolas | (Spain) Alejandro Moro Cañas (Spain) Martín Landaluce (France) Hugo Gaston (France) Pierre-Hugues Herbert |
| November 20 | Keio Challenger; Yokohama, Japan; Hard – Challenger 75 – 32S/24Q/16D; Singles – Doubles | (Japan) Yosuke Watanuki; 7–6^{(7–5)}, 6–4 | (Japan) Yuta Shimizu | (United States) Michael Mmoh (Japan) Yasutaka Uchiyama | (Italy) Giovanni Fonio (Italy) Luca Nardi (Hong Kong) Coleman Wong (Australia) Li Tu |
| November 20 | Keio Challenger; Yokohama, Japan; Hard – Challenger 75 – 32S/24Q/16D; Singles – Doubles | (Sweden) Filip Bergevi (Netherlands) Mick Veldheer; 2–6, 7–5, [11–9] | (Chinese Taipei) Ray Ho (Australia) Calum Puttergill | (United States) Michael Mmoh (Japan) Yasutaka Uchiyama | (Italy) Giovanni Fonio (Italy) Luca Nardi (Hong Kong) Coleman Wong (Australia) Li Tu |
| November 27 | Maia Challenger; Maia, Portugal; Clay (i) – Challenger 100 – 32S/24Q/16D; Singles – Doubles | (Portugal) Nuno Borges; 6–1, 6–4 | (France) Benoît Paire | (France) Matteo Martineau (France) Maxime Janvier | (Italy) Andrea Vavassori (United Kingdom) Anton Matusevich (Sweden) Elias Ymer (Spain) Albert Ramos Viñolas |
| November 27 | Maia Challenger; Maia, Portugal; Clay (i) – Challenger 100 – 32S/24Q/16D; Singles – Doubles | (Italy) Marco Bortolotti (Italy) Andrea Vavassori; 6–4, 3–6, [12–10] | (Brazil) Fernando Romboli (Poland) Szymon Walków | (France) Matteo Martineau (France) Maxime Janvier | (Italy) Andrea Vavassori (United Kingdom) Anton Matusevich (Sweden) Elias Ymer (Spain) Albert Ramos Viñolas |
| November 27 | Yokkaichi Challenger; Yokkaichi, Japan; Hard – Challenger 100 – 32S/24Q/16D; Singles – Doubles | (Belgium) Zizou Bergs; 6–2, 7–6^{(7–2)} | (United States) Michael Mmoh | (Australia) Marc Polmans (Hong Kong) Coleman Wong | (Italy) Giovanni Fonio (Japan) James Trotter (Australia) Li Tu (Denmark) August Holmgren |
| November 27 | Yokkaichi Challenger; Yokkaichi, Japan; Hard – Challenger 100 – 32S/24Q/16D; Singles – Doubles | (United States) Evan King (United States) Reese Stalder; 7–5, 6–4 | (Chinese Taipei) Ray Ho (Australia) Calum Puttergill | (Australia) Marc Polmans (Hong Kong) Coleman Wong | (Italy) Giovanni Fonio (Japan) James Trotter (Australia) Li Tu (Denmark) August Holmgren |
| November 27 | Maspalomas Challenger; Maspalomas, Spain; Clay – Challenger 75 – 32S/24Q/16D; Singles – Doubles | (Spain) Pedro Martínez; 6–4, 4–6, 6–3 | (Switzerland) Kilian Feldbausch | (Austria) Filip Misolic (Spain) Daniel Rincón | Svyatoslav Gulin (Bulgaria) Adrian Andreev (Czech Republic) Jonáš Forejtek (Spain) Imanol López Morillo |
| November 27 | Maspalomas Challenger; Maspalomas, Spain; Clay – Challenger 75 – 32S/24Q/16D; Singles – Doubles | (United Kingdom) Scott Duncan (United Kingdom) Marcus Willis; 7–6^{(7–5)}, 6–4 | (France) Théo Arribagé (France) Sadio Doumbia | (Austria) Filip Misolic (Spain) Daniel Rincón | Svyatoslav Gulin (Bulgaria) Adrian Andreev (Czech Republic) Jonáš Forejtek (Spain) Imanol López Morillo |
| November 27 | Challenger Temuco; Temuco, Chile; Hard – Challenger 75 – 32S/24Q/16D; Singles – Doubles | (United States) Aleksandar Kovacevic; 4–6, 6–3, 6–3 | (Brazil) Gilbert Klier Júnior | (Chile) Tomás Barrios Vera (Monaco) Valentin Vacherot | (Jamaica) Blaise Bicknell (Brazil) Pedro Sakamoto (Argentina) Santiago Rodríguez Taverna (United States) Alafia Ayeni |
| November 27 | Challenger Temuco; Temuco, Chile; Hard – Challenger 75 – 32S/24Q/16D; Singles – Doubles | (Brazil) Mateus Alves (Chile) Matías Soto; 6–2, 7–5 | (United States) Aleksandar Kovacevic (United States) Keegan Smith | (Chile) Tomás Barrios Vera (Monaco) Valentin Vacherot | (Jamaica) Blaise Bicknell (Brazil) Pedro Sakamoto (Argentina) Santiago Rodríguez Taverna (United States) Alafia Ayeni |

== Cancelled tournaments ==
The following tournaments were formally announced by the ATP before being cancelled.

| Week of | Tournament |
|---|---|
| January 23 | Columbus Challenger I Columbus, United States; Hard (i) – Challenger 75 |
| April 3 | Villeneuve-Loubet Challenger; Villeneuve-Loubet, France; Clay – Challenger 50 |
| May 15 | Zagreb Open; Zagreb, Croatia; Clay – Challenger 50 |
| August 14 | Barranquilla Open; Barranquilla, Colombia; Hard – Challenger 75 |
| August 28 | Internationaux de Tennis de Toulouse; Toulouse, France; Clay – Challenger 75 |
| October 23 | Las Vegas Challenger; Las Vegas, United States; Hard – Challenger 75 |

== Statistical information ==
These tables present the number of singles (S) and doubles (D) titles won by each player and each nation during the season. The players/nations are sorted by: 1) total number of titles (a doubles title won by two players representing the same nation counts as only one win for the nation); 2) a singles > doubles hierarchy; 3) alphabetical order (by family names for players).

The ATP announced in March 2022 that players representing Russia or Belarus would not be able to compete under their respective country's flag due to the 2022 Russian invasion of Ukraine. These players competed under no nationality, and any titles won by these players weren't counted towards a country's tally of total titles.

=== Titles won by player ===
| Total | Player | S | D | S | D |
|---|---|---|---|---|---|
| 8 | Dan Added (FRA) | | ● ● ● ● ● ● ● ● | 0 | 8 |
| 8 | Evan King (USA) | | ● ● ● ● ● ● ● ● | 0 | 8 |
| 7 | Hendrik Jebens (GER) | | ● ● ● ● ● ● ● | 0 | 7 |
| 7 | Andrew Paulson (CZE) | | ● ● ● ● ● ● ● | 0 | 7 |
| 7 | Reese Stalder (USA) | | ● ● ● ● ● ● ● | 0 | 7 |
| 6 | Max Purcell (AUS) | ● ● ● | ● ● ● | 3 | 3 |
| 6 | Manuel Guinard (FRA) | ● | ● ● ● ● ● | 1 | 5 |
| 6 | Guido Andreozzi (ARG) | | ● ● ● ● ● ● | 0 | 6 |
| 6 | Victor Vlad Cornea (ROU) | | ● ● ● ● ● ● | 0 | 6 |
| 6 | Constantin Frantzen (GER) | | ● ● ● ● ● ● | 0 | 6 |
| 6 | Petr Nouza (CZE) | | ● ● ● ● ● ● | 0 | 6 |
| 5 | Mariano Navone (ARG) | ● ● ● ● ● | | 5 | 0 |
| 5 | Thiago Seyboth Wild (BRA) | ● ● ● ● | ● | 4 | 1 |
| 5 | Julian Cash (GBR) | | ● ● ● ● ● | 0 | 5 |
| 5 | Robert Galloway (USA) | | ● ● ● ● ● | 0 | 5 |
| 5 | Grégoire Jacq (FRA) | | ● ● ● ● ● | 0 | 5 |
| 5 | Luke Johnson (GBR) | | ● ● ● ● ● | 0 | 5 |
| 5 | Skander Mansouri (TUN) | | ● ● ● ● ● | 0 | 5 |
| 4 | Facundo Díaz Acosta (ARG) | ● ● ● ● | | 4 | 0 |
| 4 | Aleksandar Kovacevic (USA) | ● ● ● ● | | 4 | 0 |
| 4 | Alejandro Tabilo (CHI) | ● ● ● ● | | 4 | 0 |
| 4 | Zizou Bergs (BEL) | ● ● ● | ● | 3 | 1 |
| 4 | Zdeněk Kolář (CZE) | ● | ● ● ● | 1 | 3 |
| 4 | Boris Arias (BOL) | | ● ● ● ● | 0 | 4 |
| 4 | Nicolás Barrientos (COL) | | ● ● ● ● | 0 | 4 |
| 4 | André Göransson (SWE) | | ● ● ● ● | 0 | 4 |
| 4 | Ivan Liutarevich | | ● ● ● ● | 0 | 4 |
| 4 | Vladyslav Manafov (UKR) | | ● ● ● ● | 0 | 4 |
| 4 | Albano Olivetti (FRA) | | ● ● ● ● | 0 | 4 |
| 4 | Cristian Rodríguez (COL) | | ● ● ● ● | 0 | 4 |
| 4 | Sem Verbeek (NED) | | ● ● ● ● | 0 | 4 |
| 4 | Federico Zeballos (BOL) | | ● ● ● ● | 0 | 4 |
| 3 | Matteo Arnaldi (ITA) | ● ● ● | | 3 | 0 |
| 3 | Nuno Borges (POR) | ● ● ● | | 3 | 0 |
| 3 | Constant Lestienne (FRA) | ● ● ● | | 3 | 0 |
| 3 | Hamad Medjedovic (SRB) | ● ● ● | | 3 | 0 |
| 3 | Andy Murray (GBR) | ● ● ● | | 3 | 0 |
| 3 | Zachary Svajda (USA) | ● ● ● | | 3 | 0 |
| 3 | Francisco Comesaña (ARG) | ● ● | ● | 2 | 1 |
| 3 | Pedro Martínez (ESP) | ● ● | ● | 2 | 1 |
| 3 | Thiago Agustín Tirante (ARG) | ● ● | ● | 2 | 1 |
| 3 | Andrea Pellegrino (ITA) | ● | ● ● | 1 | 2 |
| 3 | Adam Walton (AUS) | ● | ● ● | 1 | 2 |
| 3 | Théo Arribagé (FRA) | | ● ● ● | 0 | 3 |
| 3 | Sriram Balaji (IND) | | ● ● ● | 0 | 3 |
| 3 | Andre Begemann (GER) | | ● ● ● | 0 | 3 |
| 3 | Ariel Behar (URU) | | ● ● ● | 0 | 3 |
| 3 | Yuki Bhambri (IND) | | ● ● ● | 0 | 3 |
| 3 | Pedro Boscardin Dias (BRA) | | ● ● ● | 0 | 3 |
| 3 | Anirudh Chandrasekar (IND) | | ● ● ● | 0 | 3 |
| 3 | Karol Drzewiecki (POL) | | ● ● ● | 0 | 3 |
| 3 | Guillermo Durán (ARG) | | ● ● ● | 0 | 3 |
| 3 | Jonathan Eysseric (FRA) | | ● ● ● | 0 | 3 |
| 3 | Andrew Harris (AUS) | | ● ● ● | 0 | 3 |
| 3 | Christian Harrison (USA) | | ● ● ● | 0 | 3 |
| 3 | Diego Hidalgo (ECU) | | ● ● ● | 0 | 3 |
| 3 | Luis David Martínez (VEN) | | ● ● ● | 0 | 3 |
| 3 | Denys Molchanov (UKR) | | ● ● ● | 0 | 3 |
| 3 | Nam Ji-sung (KOR) | | ● ● ● | 0 | 3 |
| 3 | Adam Pavlásek (CZE) | | ● ● ● | 0 | 3 |
| 3 | David Pel (NED) | | ● ● ● | 0 | 3 |
| 3 | Vijay Sundar Prashanth (IND) | | ● ● ● | 0 | 3 |
| 3 | Miguel Ángel Reyes-Varela (MEX) | | ● ● ● | 0 | 3 |
| 3 | Luca Sanchez (FRA) | | ● ● ● | 0 | 3 |
| 3 | Franko Škugor (CRO) | | ● ● ● | 0 | 3 |
| 3 | Marcelo Zormann (BRA) | | ● ● ● | 0 | 3 |
| 2 | Duje Ajduković (CRO) | ● ● | | 2 | 0 |
| 2 | Térence Atmane (FRA) | ● ● | | 2 | 0 |
| 2 | Tomás Barrios Vera (CHI) | ● ● | | 2 | 0 |
| 2 | Juan Manuel Cerúndolo (ARG) | ● ● | | 2 | 0 |
| 2 | Federico Coria (ARG) | ● ● | | 2 | 0 |
| 2 | Luciano Darderi (ITA) | ● ● | | 2 | 0 |
| 2 | Hugo Dellien (BOL) | ● ● | | 2 | 0 |
| 2 | James Duckworth (AUS) | ● ● | | 2 | 0 |
| 2 | Ivan Gakhov | ● ● | | 2 | 0 |
| 2 | Hugo Gaston (FRA) | ● ● | | 2 | 0 |
| 2 | Matteo Gigante (ITA) | ● ● | | 2 | 0 |
| 2 | Hugo Grenier (FRA) | ● ● | | 2 | 0 |
| 2 | Ugo Humbert (FRA) | ● ● | | 2 | 0 |
| 2 | Steve Johnson (USA) | ● ● | | 2 | 0 |
| 2 | Dominik Koepfer (GER) | ● ● | | 2 | 0 |
| 2 | Vít Kopřiva (CZE) | ● ● | | 2 | 0 |
| 2 | Patrick Kypson (USA) | ● ● | | 2 | 0 |
| 2 | Tomáš Macháč (CZE) | ● ● | | 2 | 0 |
| 2 | Illya Marchenko (UKR) | ● ● | | 2 | 0 |
| 2 | Fábián Marozsán (HUN) | ● ● | | 2 | 0 |
| 2 | Maximilian Marterer (GER) | ● ● | | 2 | 0 |
| 2 | Alex Michelsen (USA) | ● ● | | 2 | 0 |
| 2 | Sumit Nagal (IND) | ● ● | | 2 | 0 |
| 2 | Luca Nardi (ITA) | ● ● | | 2 | 0 |
| 2 | Benoît Paire (FRA) | ● ● | | 2 | 0 |
| 2 | Zsombor Piros (HUN) | ● ● | | 2 | 0 |
| 2 | Alexander Shevchenko | ● ● | | 2 | 0 |
| 2 | Sho Shimabukuro (JPN) | ● ● | | 2 | 0 |
| 2 | Dominic Stricker (SUI) | ● ● | | 2 | 0 |
| 2 | Jordan Thompson (AUS) | ● ● | | 2 | 0 |
| 2 | Luca Van Assche (FRA) | ● ● | | 2 | 0 |
| 2 | Otto Virtanen (FIN) | ● ● | | 2 | 0 |
| 2 | Antoine Bellier (SUI) | ● | ● | 1 | 1 |
| 2 | Liam Broady (GBR) | ● | ● | 1 | 1 |
| 2 | Flavio Cobolli (ITA) | ● | ● | 1 | 1 |
| 2 | Gabriel Diallo (CAN) | ● | ● | 1 | 1 |
| 2 | Rinky Hijikata (AUS) | ● | ● | 1 | 1 |
| 2 | Jason Kubler (AUS) | ● | ● | 1 | 1 |
| 2 | Shintaro Mochizuki (JPN) | ● | ● | 1 | 1 |
| 2 | Dennis Novak (AUT) | ● | ● | 1 | 1 |
| 2 | Oriol Roca Batalla (ESP) | ● | ● | 1 | 1 |
| 2 | Vitaliy Sachko (UKR) | ● | ● | 1 | 1 |
| 2 | Abdullah Shelbayh (JOR) | ● | ● | 1 | 1 |
| 2 | Mateus Alves (BRA) | | ● ● | 0 | 2 |
| 2 | Sander Arends (NED) | | ● ● | 0 | 2 |
| 2 | Romain Arneodo (MON) | | ● ● | 0 | 2 |
| 2 | Filip Bergevi (SWE) | | ● ● | 0 | 2 |
| 2 | William Blumberg (USA) | | ● ● | 0 | 2 |
| 2 | Alex Bolt (AUS) | | ● ● | 0 | 2 |
| 2 | Marco Bortolotti (ITA) | | ● ● | 0 | 2 |
| 2 | Ignacio Carou (URU) | | ● ● | 0 | 2 |
| 2 | Luca Castelnuovo (SUI) | | ● ● | 0 | 2 |
| 2 | Sadio Doumbia (FRA) | | ● ● | 0 | 2 |
| 2 | Alexander Erler (AUT) | | ● ● | 0 | 2 |
| 2 | Andrey Golubev (KAZ) | | ● ● | 0 | 2 |
| 2 | Gustavo Heide (BRA) | | ● ● | 0 | 2 |
| 2 | Pierre-Hugues Herbert (FRA) | | ● ● | 0 | 2 |
| 2 | Arjun Kadhe (IND) | | ● ● | 0 | 2 |
| 2 | Niki Kaliyanda Poonacha (IND) | | ● ● | 0 | 2 |
| 2 | Vasil Kirkov (USA) | | ● ● | 0 | 2 |
| 2 | Miķelis Lībietis (LAT) | | ● ● | 0 | 2 |
| 2 | Luca Margaroli (SUI) | | ● ● | 0 | 2 |
| 2 | Ben McLachlan (JPN) | | ● ● | 0 | 2 |
| 2 | Lucas Miedler (AUT) | | ● ● | 0 | 2 |
| 2 | Saketh Myneni (IND) | | ● ● | 0 | 2 |
| 2 | Fabien Reboul (FRA) | | ● ● | 0 | 2 |
| 2 | Santiago Rodríguez Taverna (ARG) | | ● ● | 0 | 2 |
| 2 | Fernando Romboli (BRA) | | ● ● | 0 | 2 |
| 2 | Matthew Romios (AUS) | | ● ● | 0 | 2 |
| 2 | Ryan Seggerman (USA) | | ● ● | 0 | 2 |
| 2 | Colin Sinclair (NMI) | | ● ● | 0 | 2 |
| 2 | John-Patrick Smith (AUS) | | ● ● | 0 | 2 |
| 2 | Song Min-kyu (KOR) | | ● ● | 0 | 2 |
| 2 | Matías Soto (CHI) | | ● ● | 0 | 2 |
| 2 | Bart Stevens (NED) | | ● ● | 0 | 2 |
| 2 | Jason Taylor (AUS) | | ● ● | 0 | 2 |
| 2 | Patrik Trhac (USA) | | ● ● | 0 | 2 |
| 2 | Andrea Vavassori (ITA) | | ● ● | 0 | 2 |
| 2 | Sam Weissborn (AUT) | | ● ● | 0 | 2 |
| 1 | Franco Agamenone (ITA) | ● | | 1 | 0 |
| 1 | Daniel Altmaier (GER) | ● | | 1 | 0 |
| 1 | Grégoire Barrère (FRA) | ● | | 1 | 0 |
| 1 | Mattia Bellucci (ITA) | ● | | 1 | 0 |
| 1 | Ričardas Berankis (LTU) | ● | | 1 | 0 |
| 1 | Ugo Blanchet (FRA) | ● | | 1 | 0 |
| 1 | Raúl Brancaccio (ITA) | ● | | 1 | 0 |
| 1 | Bu Yunchaokete (CHN) | ● | | 1 | 0 |
| 1 | Roberto Carballés Baena (ESP) | ● | | 1 | 0 |
| 1 | Arthur Cazaux (FRA) | ● | | 1 | 0 |
| 1 | Jan Choinski (GBR) | ● | | 1 | 0 |
| 1 | Andrea Collarini (ARG) | ● | | 1 | 0 |
| 1 | Maxime Cressy (USA) | ● | | 1 | 0 |
| 1 | Taro Daniel (JPN) | ● | | 1 | 0 |
| 1 | Jesper de Jong (NED) | ● | | 1 | 0 |
| 1 | Joris De Loore (BEL) | ● | | 1 | 0 |
| 1 | Federico Delbonis (ARG) | ● | | 1 | 0 |
| 1 | Jack Draper (GBR) | ● | | 1 | 0 |
| 1 | Liam Draxl (CAN) | ● | | 1 | 0 |
| 1 | Damir Džumhur (BIH) | ● | | 1 | 0 |
| 1 | Nerman Fatić (BIH) | ● | | 1 | 0 |
| 1 | Arthur Fils (FRA) | ● | | 1 | 0 |
| 1 | Fabio Fognini (ITA) | ● | | 1 | 0 |
| 1 | Márton Fucsovics (HUN) | ● | | 1 | 0 |
| 1 | Alexis Galarneau (CAN) | ● | | 1 | 0 |
| 1 | Alessandro Giannessi (ITA) | ● | | 1 | 0 |
| 1 | David Goffin (BEL) | ● | | 1 | 0 |
| 1 | Álvaro Guillén Meza (ECU) | ● | | 1 | 0 |
| 1 | Quentin Halys (FRA) | ● | | 1 | 0 |
| 1 | Kyrian Jacquet (FRA) | ● | | 1 | 0 |
| 1 | Lukáš Klein (SVK) | ● | | 1 | 0 |
| 1 | Thanasi Kokkinakis (AUS) | ● | | 1 | 0 |
| 1 | Denis Kudla (USA) | ● | | 1 | 0 |
| 1 | Mark Lajal (EST) | ● | | 1 | 0 |
| 1 | Pablo Llamas Ruiz (ESP) | ● | | 1 | 0 |
| 1 | Felipe Meligeni Alves (BRA) | ● | | 1 | 0 |
| 1 | Jakub Menšík (CZE) | ● | | 1 | 0 |
| 1 | Filip Misolic (AUT) | ● | | 1 | 0 |
| 1 | Rudolf Molleker (GER) | ● | | 1 | 0 |
| 1 | Thiago Monteiro (BRA) | ● | | 1 | 0 |
| 1 | Nicolas Moreno de Alboran (USA) | ● | | 1 | 0 |
| 1 | Corentin Moutet (FRA) | ● | | 1 | 0 |
| 1 | Giovanni Mpetshi Perricard (FRA) | ● | | 1 | 0 |
| 1 | Alexandre Müller (FRA) | ● | | 1 | 0 |
| 1 | Jaume Munar (ESP) | ● | | 1 | 0 |
| 1 | Emilio Nava (USA) | ● | | 1 | 0 |
| 1 | Kei Nishikori (JPN) | ● | | 1 | 0 |
| 1 | Christopher O'Connell (AUS) | ● | | 1 | 0 |
| 1 | Sebastian Ofner (AUT) | ● | | 1 | 0 |
| 1 | Genaro Alberto Olivieri (ARG) | ● | | 1 | 0 |
| 1 | Ryan Peniston (GBR) | ● | | 1 | 0 |
| 1 | Dino Prižmić (CRO) | ● | | 1 | 0 |
| 1 | Matheus Pucinelli de Almeida (BRA) | ● | | 1 | 0 |
| 1 | Arthur Rinderknech (FRA) | ● | | 1 | 0 |
| 1 | Jurij Rodionov (AUT) | ● | | 1 | 0 |
| 1 | Roman Safiullin | ● | | 1 | 0 |
| 1 | Dalibor Svrčina (CZE) | ● | | 1 | 0 |
| 1 | Carlos Taberner (ESP) | ● | | 1 | 0 |
| 1 | Camilo Ugo Carabelli (ARG) | ● | | 1 | 0 |
| 1 | Máté Valkusz (HUN) | ● | | 1 | 0 |
| 1 | Aleksandar Vukic (AUS) | ● | | 1 | 0 |
| 1 | Yosuke Watanuki (JPN) | ● | | 1 | 0 |
| 1 | Arthur Weber (FRA) | ● | | 1 | 0 |
| 1 | Denis Yevseyev (KAZ) | ● | | 1 | 0 |
| 1 | Giulio Zeppieri (ITA) | ● | | 1 | 0 |
| 1 | Beibit Zhukayev (KAZ) | ● | | 1 | 0 |
| 1 | Valerio Aboian (ARG) | | ● | 0 | 1 |
| 1 | Juan Carlos Aguilar (CAN) | | ● | 0 | 1 |
| 1 | Alberto Barroso Campos (ESP) | | ● | 0 | 1 |
| 1 | Jacopo Berrettini (ITA) | | ● | 0 | 1 |
| 1 | Bogdan Bobrov | | ● | 0 | 1 |
| 1 | Rithvik Choudary Bollipalli (IND) | | ● | 0 | 1 |
| 1 | Justin Boulais (CAN) | | ● | 0 | 1 |
| 1 | Gonzalo Bueno (PER) | | ● | 0 | 1 |
| 1 | Francisco Cabral (POR) | | ● | 0 | 1 |
| 1 | Robert Cash (USA) | | ● | 0 | 1 |
| 1 | Íñigo Cervantes (ESP) | | ● | 0 | 1 |
| 1 | Chung Yun-seong (KOR) | | ● | 0 | 1 |
| 1 | Jay Clarke (GBR) | | ● | 0 | 1 |
| 1 | Daniel Cukierman (ISR) | | ● | 0 | 1 |
| 1 | Murkel Dellien (BOL) | | ● | 0 | 1 |
| 1 | S D Prajwal Dev (IND) | | ● | 0 | 1 |
| 1 | Aziz Dougaz (TUN) | | ● | 0 | 1 |
| 1 | Titouan Droguet (FRA) | | ● | 0 | 1 |
| 1 | Scott Duncan (GBR) | | ● | 0 | 1 |
| 1 | Daniel Dutra da Silva (BRA) | | ● | 0 | 1 |
| 1 | Gonzalo Escobar (ECU) | | ● | 0 | 1 |
| 1 | Antoine Escoffier (FRA) | | ● | 0 | 1 |
| 1 | Fabian Fallert (GER) | | ● | 0 | 1 |
| 1 | Jacob Fearnley (GBR) | | ● | 0 | 1 |
| 1 | Sergey Fomin (UZB) | | ● | 0 | 1 |
| 1 | Giovanni Fonio (ITA) | | ● | 0 | 1 |
| 1 | Francesco Forti (ITA) | | ● | 0 | 1 |
| 1 | Federico Gaio (ITA) | | ● | 0 | 1 |
| 1 | Gao Xin (CHN) | | ● | 0 | 1 |
| 1 | Marek Gengel (CZE) | | ● | 0 | 1 |
| 1 | Lloyd Glasspool (GBR) | | ● | 0 | 1 |
| 1 | Federico Agustín Gómez (ARG) | | ● | 0 | 1 |
| 1 | Juan Sebastián Gómez (COL) | | ● | 0 | 1 |
| 1 | Hans Hach Verdugo (MEX) | | ● | 0 | 1 |
| 1 | Harri Heliövaara (FIN) | | ● | 0 | 1 |
| 1 | Ray Ho (TPE) | | ● | 0 | 1 |
| 1 | Hsu Yu-hsiou (TPE) | | ● | 0 | 1 |
| 1 | Arklon Huertas del Pino (PER) | | ● | 0 | 1 |
| 1 | Conner Huertas del Pino (PER) | | ● | 0 | 1 |
| 1 | Alexandru Jecan (ROU) | | ● | 0 | 1 |
| 1 | Nicolás Kicker (ARG) | | ● | 0 | 1 |
| 1 | Szymon Kielan (POL) | | ● | 0 | 1 |
| 1 | Cannon Kingsley (USA) | | ● | 0 | 1 |
| 1 | Nathaniel Lammons (USA) | | ● | 0 | 1 |
| 1 | Orlando Luz (BRA) | | ● | 0 | 1 |
| 1 | Sergio Martos Gornés (ESP) | | ● | 0 | 1 |
| 1 | Toshihide Matsui (JPN) | | ● | 0 | 1 |
| 1 | Piotr Matuszewski (POL) | | ● | 0 | 1 |
| 1 | Johannus Monday (GBR) | | ● | 0 | 1 |
| 1 | Brandon Nakashima (USA) | | ● | 0 | 1 |
| 1 | Aleksandr Nedovyesov (KAZ) | | ● | 0 | 1 |
| 1 | Patrik Niklas-Salminen (FIN) | | ● | 0 | 1 |
| 1 | Jonny O'Mara (GBR) | | ● | 0 | 1 |
| 1 | Neil Oberleitner (AUT) | | ● | 0 | 1 |
| 1 | Renzo Olivo (ARG) | | ● | 0 | 1 |
| 1 | Giovanni Oradini (ITA) | | ● | 0 | 1 |
| 1 | Philipp Oswald (AUT) | | ● | 0 | 1 |
| 1 | Joshua Paris (GBR) | | ● | 0 | 1 |
| 1 | Henry Patten (GBR) | | ● | 0 | 1 |
| 1 | John Peers (AUS) | | ● | 0 | 1 |
| 1 | Filip Peliwo (POL) | | ● | 0 | 1 |
| 1 | Alfredo Perez (USA) | | ● | 0 | 1 |
| 1 | Michail Pervolarakis (GRE) | | ● | 0 | 1 |
| 1 | Marc Polmans (AUS) | | ● | 0 | 1 |
| 1 | Oleg Prihodko (UKR) | | ● | 0 | 1 |
| 1 | Aisam-ul-Haq Qureshi (PAK) | | ● | 0 | 1 |
| 1 | João Lucas Reis da Silva (BRA) | | ● | 0 | 1 |
| 1 | Arthur Reymond (FRA) | | ● | 0 | 1 |
| 1 | Eduardo Ribeiro (BRA) | | ● | 0 | 1 |
| 1 | Leandro Riedi (SUI) | | ● | 0 | 1 |
| 1 | Patrik Rikl (CZE) | | ● | 0 | 1 |
| 1 | Daniel Rincón (ESP) | | ● | 0 | 1 |
| 1 | Blaž Rola (SLO) | | ● | 0 | 1 |
| 1 | Lorenzo Rottoli (ITA) | | ● | 0 | 1 |
| 1 | Ivan Sabanov (SRB) | | ● | 0 | 1 |
| 1 | Matej Sabanov (SRB) | | ● | 0 | 1 |
| 1 | Toby Samuel (GBR) | | ● | 0 | 1 |
| 1 | Tim Sandkaulen (GER) | | ● | 0 | 1 |
| 1 | Akira Santillan (AUS) | | ● | 0 | 1 |
| 1 | Luke Saville (AUS) | | ● | 0 | 1 |
| 1 | Tristan Schoolkate (AUS) | | ● | 0 | 1 |
| 1 | Nino Serdarušić (CRO) | | ● | 0 | 1 |
| 1 | Divij Sharan (IND) | | ● | 0 | 1 |
| 1 | Artem Sitak (NZL) | | ● | 0 | 1 |
| 1 | Eliot Spizzirri (USA) | | ● | 0 | 1 |
| 1 | Rubin Statham (NZL) | | ● | 0 | 1 |
| 1 | James Trotter (JPN) | | ● | 0 | 1 |
| 1 | Petros Tsitsipas (GRE) | | ● | 0 | 1 |
| 1 | Yasutaka Uchiyama (JPN) | | ● | 0 | 1 |
| 1 | Kaito Uesugi (JPN) | | ● | 0 | 1 |
| 1 | Andrés Urrea (COL) | | ● | 0 | 1 |
| 1 | Daniel Vallejo (PAR) | | ● | 0 | 1 |
| 1 | Mick Veldheer (NED) | | ● | 0 | 1 |
| 1 | Michael Vrbenský (CZE) | | ● | 0 | 1 |
| 1 | Wang Aoran (CHN) | | ● | 0 | 1 |
| 1 | Marcus Willis (GBR) | | ● | 0 | 1 |
| 1 | Jackson Withrow (USA) | | ● | 0 | 1 |
| 1 | Tyler Zink (USA) | | ● | 0 | 1 |

=== Titles won by nation ===
| Total | Nation | S | D |
|---|---|---|---|
| 49 | France (FRA) | 27 | 22 |
| 43 | United States (USA) | 17 | 26 |
| 33 | Argentina (ARG) | 21 | 12 |
| 28 | Australia (AUS) | 13 | 15 |
| 24 | Italy (ITA) | 17 | 7 |
| 24 | Great Britain (GBR) | 7 | 17 |
| 22 | Czech Republic (CZE) | 7 | 15 |
| 17 | Brazil (BRA) | 7 | 10 |
| 17 | Germany (GER) | 6 | 11 |
| 15 | India (IND) | 2 | 13 |
| 12 | Japan (JPN) | 6 | 6 |
| 12 | Ukraine (UKR) | 3 | 9 |
| 11 | Spain (ESP) | 7 | 4 |
| 11 | Austria (AUT) | 4 | 7 |
| 11 | Netherlands (NED) | 1 | 10 |
| 9 | Colombia (COL) | 0 | 9 |
| 8 | Chile (CHI) | 6 | 2 |
| 8 | Switzerland (SUI) | 3 | 5 |
| 7 | Croatia (CRO) | 3 | 4 |
| 7 | Bolivia (BOL) | 2 | 5 |
| 7 | Romania (ROU) | 0 | 7 |
| 6 | Hungary (HUN) | 6 | 0 |
| 6 | Belgium (BEL) | 5 | 1 |
| 6 | Sweden (SWE) | 0 | 6 |
| 6 | Tunisia (TUN) | 0 | 6 |
| 5 | Canada (CAN) | 3 | 2 |
| 5 | Kazakhstan (KAZ) | 2 | 3 |
| 5 | Ecuador (ECU) | 1 | 4 |
| 5 | Poland (POL) | 0 | 5 |
| 5 | Uruguay (URU) | 0 | 5 |
| 4 | Portugal (POR) | 3 | 1 |
| 4 | Serbia (SRB) | 3 | 1 |
| 4 | Finland (FIN) | 2 | 2 |
| 4 | Mexico (MEX) | 0 | 4 |
| 4 | South Korea (KOR) | 0 | 4 |
| 3 | Venezuela (VEN) | 0 | 3 |
| 2 | Bosnia and Herzegovina (BIH) | 2 | 0 |
| 2 | China (CHN) | 1 | 1 |
| 2 | Jordan (JOR) | 1 | 1 |
| 2 | Chinese Taipei (TPE) | 0 | 2 |
| 2 | Greece (GRE) | 0 | 2 |
| 2 | Latvia (LAT) | 0 | 2 |
| 2 | Monaco (MON) | 0 | 2 |
| 2 | New Zealand (NZL) | 0 | 2 |
| 2 | Northern Mariana Islands (NMI) | 0 | 2 |
| 2 | Peru (PER) | 0 | 2 |
| 1 | Estonia (EST) | 1 | 0 |
| 1 | Lithuania (LTU) | 1 | 0 |
| 1 | Slovakia (SVK) | 1 | 0 |
| 1 | Israel (ISR) | 0 | 1 |
| 1 | Pakistan (PAK) | 0 | 1 |
| 1 | Paraguay (PAR) | 0 | 1 |
| 1 | Slovenia (SLO) | 0 | 1 |
| 1 | Uzbekistan (UZB) | 0 | 1 |

== Point distribution ==
Points are awarded as follows:

| Tournament category | Singles | | | | | | | | | Doubles | | | | |
| Tournament category | W | F | SF | QF | R16 | R32 | Q | Q2 | Q1 | W | F | SF | QF | R16 |
|---|---|---|---|---|---|---|---|---|---|---|---|---|---|---|
| Challenger 175 | 175 | 100 | 60 | 32 | 15 | 0 | 6 | 3 | 0 | 175 | 100 | 60 | 32 | 0 |
| Challenger 125 | 125 | 75 | 45 | 25 | 11 | 0 | 5 | 2 | 0 | 125 | 75 | 45 | 25 | 0 |
| Challenger 100 | 100 | 60 | 36 | 20 | 9 | 0 | 5 | 2 | 0 | 100 | 60 | 36 | 20 | 0 |
| Challenger 75 | 75 | 50 | 30 | 16 | 7 | 0 | 4 | 2 | 0 | 75 | 50 | 30 | 16 | 0 |
| Challenger 50 | 50 | 30 | 17 | 9 | 4 | 0 | 3 | 1 | 0 | 50 | 30 | 17 | 9 | 0 |
