= 2023 Challenger Temuco =

- Date: 27 November – 3 December
- Edition: 2nd
- Surface: Hard
- Location: Temuco, Chile

Champions

Singles
- (United States) Aleksandar Kovacevic

Doubles
- (Brazil) Mateus Alves / (Chile) Matías Soto
← 2022 ·	Challenger Temuco	· 2024 →

The 2023 Challenger Temuco was a professional tennis tournament played on hard courts. It was the second edition of the tournament which was part of the 2023 ATP Challenger Tour. It took place in Temuco, Chile between 27 November and 3 December 2023.

== Singles main-draw entrants ==
=== Seeds ===
Country	Player	Rank^{1}	Seed
CHI	Tomás Barrios Vera	104	1
~~CHI~~	~~Alejandro Tabilo~~	~~106~~	~~2~~
BOL	Hugo Dellien	108	3
USA	Aleksandar Kovacevic	120	4
ARG	Guido Andreozzi	178	5
ARG	Santiago Rodríguez Taverna	244	6
BRA	Gustavo Heide	248	7
ARG	Juan Pablo Ficovich	282	8

- ^{1} Rankings are as of 20 November 2023.

=== Other entrants ===
The following players received wildcards into the singles main draw:

- (Chile) Diego Fernández Flores
- (Chile) Gonzalo Lama
- (Chile) Matías Soto

The following players received entry into the singles main draw as alternates:

- (United States) Alafia Ayeni
- (United States) Bruno Kuzuhara

The following players received entry from the qualifying draw:

- (Ecuador) Andrés Andrade
- (Peru) Ignacio Buse
- (Brazil) Gabriel Décamps
- (Argentina) Mariano Kestelboim
- (Argentina) Facundo Mena
- (United States) Keegan Smith

The following player received entry as a lucky loser:

- (Peru) Conner Huertas del Pino

== Champions ==
=== Singles ===
- (United States) Aleksandar Kovacevic def. (Brazil) Gilbert Klier Júnior 4–6, 6–3, 6–3.

=== Doubles ===
- (Brazil) Mateus Alves / (Chile) Matías Soto def. (United States) Aleksandar Kovacevic / (United States) Keegan Smith 6–2, 7–5.
