= 2024 Challenger Temuco – Singles =

Singles
- 2024 Challenger Temuco

Final
- Champion: (Lebanon) Hady Habib
- Runner-up: (Argentina) Camilo Ugo Carabelli
- Score: 6–4, 6–7^{(3–7)}, 7–6^{(7–2)}

Events
Singles	Doubles
- Challenger Temuco

Aleksandar Kovacevic was the defending champion but lost in the second round to Juan Carlos Prado Ángelo.

Hady Habib won the title after defeating Camilo Ugo Carabelli 6–4, 6–7^{(3–7)}, 7–6^{(7–2)} in the final. Habib became the first Lebanese player in history to win a Challenger trophy in singles.

== Seeds ==
1. (United States) Aleksandar Kovacevic (second round)
2. (Argentina) Francisco Comesaña (first round, retired)
3. (Argentina) Camilo Ugo Carabelli (final)
4. (Argentina) Thiago Agustín Tirante (withdrew)
5. (Chile) Tomás Barrios Vera (quarterfinals)
6. (Argentina) Santiago Rodríguez Taverna (first round)
7. (Peru) Gonzalo Bueno (first round)
8. (Brazil) Mateus Alves (first round)

== Draw ==
Key

- Q = Qualifier
- WC = Wild card
- LL = Lucky loser
- Alt = Alternate
- ITF = ITF entry
- PR = Protected ranking
- SR = Special ranking
- SE = Special exempt
- JE = Junior exempt
- JR = Junior Accelerator Programme entrant
- CO = College Accelerator Programme entrant
- NG = Next Gen Accelerator Program entrant
- w/o = Walkover
- r = Retired
- d = Defaulted

=== Finals ===
Semifinals
(Argentina) Renzo Olivo	3	4
3	(Argentina) Camilo Ugo Carabelli	6	6
(Lebanon) Hady Habib	6	6
(Brazil) João Lucas Reis da Silva	3	2

Final
3	(Argentina) Camilo Ugo Carabelli	4	7^{7}	6^{2}
(Lebanon) Hady Habib	6	6^{3}	7^{7}

=== Top half ===
First round
1	(United States) A Kovacevic	6^{6}	6	6
WC	(Chile) D Fernández Flores	7^{8}	1	4
(Argentina) GA Olivieri	7	3	4
(Bolivia) JC Prado Ángelo	5	6	6
Q	(Argentina) M Kestelboim	6	4	2
PR	(Argentina) N Kicker	4	6	6
(Argentina) R Olivo	6	7^{7}
7	(Peru) G Bueno	4	6^{3}
3	(Argentina) C Ugo Carabelli	6	6
(Argentina) JB Torres	4	2
(Switzerland) R Bertola	7	4	6
(Zimbabwe) B Lock	5	6	3
Q	(Brazil) Gilbert Klier Júnior	7	6
Q	(Brazil) P Boscardin Dias	5	1
Q	(Greece) S Sakellaridis	1	2
5	(Chile) T Barrios Vera	6	6

Second round
1	(United States) A Kovacevic	4	5
(Bolivia) JC Prado Ángelo	6	7
PR	(Argentina) N Kicker	7^{7}	3	5
(Argentina) R Olivo	6^{3}	6	7
3	(Argentina) C Ugo Carabelli	6	6
(Switzerland) R Bertola	4	2
Q	(Brazil) G Klier Júnior	5	6	6^{5}
5	(Chile) T Barrios Vera	7	1	7^{7}

Quarterfinals
(Bolivia) JC Prado Ángelo	2	4
(Argentina) R Olivo	6	6
3	(Argentina) C Ugo Carabelli	2	6	7^{8}
5	(Chile) T Barrios Vera	6	2	6^{6}

Semifinals
(Argentina) R Olivo	3	4
3	(Argentina) C Ugo Carabelli	6	6

=== Bottom half ===
First round
8	(Brazil) M Alves	4	6	6^{9}
(Ecuador) Á Guillén Meza	6	4	7^{11}
(Brazil) D Dutra da Silva	7	6
Alt	(Argentina) LE Ambrogi	5	3
Alt	(Argentina) G Villanueva	6^{9}	2
(Lebanon) H Habib	7^{11}	6
(Chile) M Soto	6	4	6
LL	(Brazil) O Luz	1	6	3
6	(Argentina) S Rodríguez Taverna	4	6^{2}
Q	(Peru) C Huertas del Pino	6	7^{7}
Alt	(Argentina) L Midón	7^{7}	6
Q	(Argentina) Tomás Farjat	6^{5}	2
WC	(Germany) D Dedura-Palomero	7^{7}	6
(Brazil) P Sakamoto	6^{3}	1
(Brazil) JL Reis da Silva	6	3
2/WC	(Argentina) F Comesaña	4	1^{r}

Second round
(Ecuador) Á Guillén Meza	6^{2}	3
(Brazil) D Dutra da Silva	7^{7}	6
(Lebanon) H Habib	7^{7}	7^{7}
(Chile) M Soto	6^{2}	6^{2}
Q	(Peru) C Huertas del Pino	6	6
Alt	(Argentina) L Midón	1	3
WC	(Germany) D Dedura-Palomero	2	7^{7}	2
(Brazil) JL Reis da Silva	6	6^{1}	6

Quarterfinals
(Brazil) D Dutra da Silva	4	2
(Lebanon) H Habib	6	6
Q	(Peru) C Huertas del Pino	5	6	6^{5}
(Brazil) JL Reis da Silva	7	3	7^{7}

Semifinals
(Lebanon) H Habib	6	6
(Brazil) JL Reis da Silva	3	2
