= 2023 Challenger Temuco – Singles =

Singles
- 2023 Challenger Temuco

Final
- Champion: (United States) Aleksandar Kovacevic
- Runner-up: (Brazil) Gilbert Klier Júnior
- Score: 4–6, 6–3, 6–3

Events
Singles	Doubles
- Challenger Temuco

Guido Andreozzi was the defending champion but lost in the first round to Keegan Smith.

Aleksandar Kovacevic won the title after defeating Gilbert Klier Júnior 4–6, 6–3, 6–3 in the final.

== Seeds ==
1. (Chile) Tomás Barrios Vera (semifinals)
2. (Chile) Alejandro Tabilo (withdrew)
3. (Bolivia) Hugo Dellien (first round)
4. (United States) Aleksandar Kovacevic (champion)
5. (Argentina) Guido Andreozzi (first round)
6. (Argentina) Santiago Rodríguez Taverna (quarterfinals)
7. (Brazil) Gustavo Heide (second round)
8. (Argentina) Juan Pablo Ficovich (first round)

== Draw ==
Key

- Q = Qualifier
- WC = Wild card
- LL = Lucky loser
- Alt = Alternate
- ITF = ITF entry
- PR = Protected ranking
- SR = Special ranking
- SE = Special exempt
- JE = Junior exempt
- JR = Junior Accelerator Programme entrant
- CO = College Accelerator Programme entrant
- NG = Next Gen Accelerator Program entrant
- w/o = Walkover
- r = Retired
- d = Defaulted

=== Finals ===
Semifinals
1	(Chile) Tomás Barrios Vera	4	3
(Brazil) Gilbert Klier Júnior	6	6
4	(United States) Aleksandar Kovacevic	6^{4}	6	6
(Monaco) Valentin Vacherot	7^{7}	0	3

Final
(Brazil) Gilbert Klier Júnior	6	3	3
4	(United States) Aleksandar Kovacevic	4	6	6

=== Top half ===
First round
1	(Chile) T Barrios Vera	6	6
WC	(Chile) D Fernández Flores	1	2
Q	(Argentina) F Mena	4	3
WC	(Chile) M Soto	6	6
Q	(Brazil) G Décamps	7^{8}	4	6^{4}
(Jamaica) B Bicknell	6^{6}	6	7^{7}
Q	(United States) K Smith	3	7^{7}	7
5	(Argentina) G Andreozzi	6	6^{4}	5
3	(Bolivia) H Dellien	6	6^{3}	4
Q	(Peru) I Buse	1	7^{7}	6
(Brazil) Gilbert Klier Júnior	6	6
(Zimbabwe) B Lock	3	2
WC	(Chile) G Lama	2	1
(Brazil) JL Reis da Silva	6	6
(Brazil) P Sakamoto	5	7^{7}	6
8	(Argentina) JP Ficovich	7	6^{5}	4

Second round
1	(Chile) T Barrios Vera	7^{7}	6
WC	(Chile) M Soto	6^{4}	4
(Jamaica) B Bicknell	6	6
Q	(United States) K Smith	3	0
Q	(Peru) I Buse	4	6^{6}
(Brazil) G Klier Júnior	6	7^{8}
(Brazil) JL Reis da Silva	4	6	2
(Brazil) P Sakamoto	6	4	6

Quarterfinals
1	(Chile) T Barrios Vera	6	7^{9}
(Jamaica) B Bicknell	4	6^{7}
(Brazil) G Klier Júnior	6	6
(Brazil) P Sakamoto	0	3

Semifinals
1	(Chile) T Barrios Vera	4	3
(Brazil) G Klier Júnior	6	6

=== Bottom half ===
First round
6	(Argentina) S Rodríguez Taverna	6^{5}	7^{7}	6
(Brazil) M Alves	7^{7}	6^{5}	4
Alt	(United States) B Kuzuhara	6	3	3
(Brazil) M Pucinelli de Almeida	3	6	6
(New Zealand) R Statham	3	3
(Argentina) G Villanueva	6	6
(Argentina) FA Gómez	7^{7}	6^{4}	6^{2}
4	(United States) A Kovacevic	6^{4}	7^{7}	7^{7}
7	(Brazil) G Heide	6	6
(Argentina) JP Paz	3	3
Q	(Argentina) M Kestelboim	5	2
(Monaco) V Vacherot	7	6
(Argentina) MF Descotte	6	3	2
Alt	(United States) A Ayeni	4	6	6
Q	(Ecuador) A Andrade	6	5	2
LL	(Peru) C Huertas del Pino	3	7	6

Second round
6	(Argentina) S Rodríguez Taverna	3	7^{10}	6
(Brazil) M Pucinelli de Almeida	6	6^{8}	1
(Argentina) G Villanueva	4	6^{5}
4	(United States) A Kovacevic	6	7^{7}
7	(Brazil) G Heide	6	4	2
(Monaco) V Vacherot	1	6	6
Alt	(United States) A Ayeni	3	6	6
LL	(Peru) C Huertas del Pino	6	0	3

Quarterfinals
6	(Argentina) S Rodríguez Taverna	3	2
4	(United States) A Kovacevic	6	6
(Monaco) V Vacherot	6	2	6
Alt	(United States) A Ayeni	2	6	4

Semifinals
4	(United States) A Kovacevic	6^{4}	6	6
(Monaco) V Vacherot	7^{7}	0	3
