= 2023 Texas Tennis Classic – Doubles =

Doubles
- 2023 Texas Tennis Classic

Final
- Champions: (Serbia) Ivan Sabanov (Serbia) Matej Sabanov
- Runners-up: (United States) Evan King (United States) Mitchell Krueger
- Score: 6–1, 3–6, [12–10]

Events
Singles	Doubles
Texas Tennis Classic	· 2024 →

This was the first edition of the tournament.

Ivan and Matej Sabanov won the title after defeating Evan King and Mitchell Krueger 6–1, 3–6, [12–10] in the final.

== Seeds ==
1. (Serbia) Ivan Sabanov / (Serbia) Matej Sabanov (champions)
2. (United Kingdom) Luke Johnson / (Netherlands) Sem Verbeek (semifinals)
3. (Australia) Alex Bolt / (Australia) Rinky Hijikata (first round)
4. (Japan) Shinji Hazawa / (Japan) Yuta Shimizu (quarterfinals)

== Draw ==
=== Key ===
- Q = Qualifier
- WC = Wild card
- LL = Lucky loser
- Alt = Alternate
- SE = Special exempt
- PR = Protected ranking
- ITF = ITF entry
- JE = Junior exempt
- w/o = Walkover
- r = Retired
- d = Defaulted
- SR = Special ranking

First round
1	(Serbia) I Sabanov (Serbia) M Sabanov	6	6
(South Korea) S-c Hong (South Korea) J-s Nam	1	1
(United States) C Harrison (Japan) S Mochizuki	4	3
(Israel) D Cukierman (Germany) T Sandkaulen	6	6
3	(Australia) A Bolt (Australia) R Hijikata	7	4	[7]
(Canada) A Galarneau (United States) A Kovacevic	5	6	[10]
(United States) U Blanch (Argentina) JP Ficovich	5	6	[10]
Alt	(Brazil) G Décamps (France) A Müller	7	2	[6]
(Italy) M Bellucci (Germany) Elmar Ejupovic	4	4
(United States) E King (United States) M Krueger	6	6
WC	(France) Martin Breysach (Hungary) Zsombor Velcz	2	4
4	(Japan) S Hazawa (Japan) Y Shimizu	6	6
WC	(United States) T Kodat (United States) C Williams	6	7^{7}
(Colombia) N Mejía (Spain) D Rincón	4	6^{4}
(Tunisia) A Dougaz (Dominican Republic) N Hardt	2	4
2	(United Kingdom) L Johnson (Netherlands) S Verbeek	6	6

Quarterfinals
1	(Serbia) I Sabanov (Serbia) M Sabanov	6	6
(Israel) D Cukierman (Germany) T Sandkaulen	2	3
(Canada) A Galarneau (United States) A Kovacevic	7^{7}	4	[8]
(United States) U Blanch (Argentina) JP Ficovich	6^{4}	6	[10]
(United States) E King (United States) M Krueger	6	6
4	(Japan) S Hazawa (Japan) Y Shimizu	4	3
WC	(United States) T Kodat (United States) C Williams	4	3
2	(United Kingdom) L Johnson (Netherlands) S Verbeek	6	6

Semifinals
1	(Serbia) I Sabanov (Serbia) M Sabanov	w/o
(United States) U Blanch (Argentina) JP Ficovich
(United States) E King (United States) M Krueger	1	6	[14]
2	(United Kingdom) L Johnson (Netherlands) S Verbeek	6	2	[12]

Final
1	(Serbia) I Sabanov (Serbia) M Sabanov	6	3	[12]
(United States) E King (United States) M Krueger	1	6	[10]
