= 2024 Challenger Temuco – Doubles =

Doubles
- 2024 Challenger Temuco

Final
- Champions: (United States) Christian Harrison (United States) Evan King
- Runners-up: (Zimbabwe) Benjamin Lock (Argentina) Renzo Olivo
- Score: 7–6^{(7–5)}, 7–5

Events
Singles	Doubles
← 2023 ·	Challenger Temuco	· 2025 →

Mateus Alves and Matías Soto were the defending champions but lost in the quarterfinals to Christian Harrison and Evan King.

Harrison and King won the title after defeating Benjamin Lock and Renzo Olivo 7–6^{(7–5)}, 7–5 in the final.

== Seeds ==
1. (Brazil) Orlando Luz / (Brazil) Marcelo Zormann (semifinals)
2. (United States) Christian Harrison / (United States) Evan King (champions)
3. (Ecuador) Diego Hidalgo / (Brazil) Fernando Romboli (quarterfinals)
4. (Bolivia) Boris Arias / (Bolivia) Federico Zeballos (first round)

== Draw ==
=== Key ===
- Q = Qualifier
- WC = Wild card
- LL = Lucky loser
- Alt = Alternate
- SE = Special exempt
- PR = Protected ranking
- ITF = ITF entry
- JE = Junior exempt
- w/o = Walkover
- r = Retired
- d = Defaulted
- SR = Special ranking

=== Draw ===
First round
1	(Brazil) O Luz (Brazil) M Zormann	7^{7}	6
Alt	(Argentina) JP Paz (Brazil) PA Saraiva dos Santos	6^{5}	4
PR	(Peru) A Huertas del Pino (Peru) C Huertas del Pino	6^{3}	3
WC	(United States) Milledge Cossu (Chile) Amador Salazar	7^{7}	6
3	(Ecuador) D Hidalgo (Brazil) F Romboli	6	7^{7}
(Argentina) Tomás Farjat (Argentina) G Villanueva	3	6^{1}
(Zimbabwe) B Lock (Argentina) R Olivo	7^{10}	7^{7}
(United Kingdom) S Duncan (United States) H Reese	6^{8}	6^{3}
(Brazil) L Britto (Brazil) D Dutra da Silva	6	6
PR	(Argentina) M Kestelboim (Argentina) N Kicker	2	1
Alt	(Brazil) Gilbert Klier Júnior (Brazil) Wilson Leite	6	6
4	(Bolivia) B Arias (Bolivia) F Zeballos	2	2
(Brazil) M Alves (Chile) M Soto	6	6
(Brazil) P Boscardin Dias (Brazil) JL Reis da Silva	3	3
(Chile) D Fernández Flores (Greece) S Sakellaridis	2	1
2	(United States) C Harrison (United States) E King	6	6

Quarterfinals
1	(Brazil) O Luz (Brazil) M Zormann	6	6
WC	(United States) M Cossu (Chile) A Salazar	3	2
3	(Ecuador) D Hidalgo (Brazil) F Romboli	4	6	[6]
(Zimbabwe) B Lock (Argentina) R Olivo	6	3	[10]
(Brazil) L Britto (Brazil) D Dutra da Silva	6	4	[10]
Alt	(Brazil) G Klier Júnior (Brazil) W Leite	4	6	[12]
(Brazil) M Alves (Chile) M Soto	4	1
2	(United States) C Harrison (United States) E King	6	6

Semifinals
1	(Brazil) O Luz (Brazil) M Zormann	7^{7}	6^{6}	[5]
(Zimbabwe) B Lock (Argentina) R Olivo	6^{2}	7^{8}	[10]
Alt	(Brazil) G Klier Júnior (Brazil) W Leite	2	4
2	(United States) C Harrison (United States) E King	6	6

Final
(Zimbabwe) B Lock (Argentina) R Olivo	6^{5}	5
2	(United States) C Harrison (United States) E King	7^{7}	7
