= 2025 Challenger Temuco – Singles =

Singles
- 2025 Challenger Temuco

Final
- Champion: (Argentina) Federico Agustín Gómez
- Runner-up: (Argentina) Lautaro Midón
- Score: 6–4, 6–1

Events
Singles	Doubles
- Challenger Temuco

Hady Habib was the defending champion but lost in the first round to Lucio Ratti.

Federico Agustín Gómez won the title after defeating Lautaro Midón 6–4, 6–1 in the final.

== Seeds ==
1. (Argentina) Juan Manuel Cerúndolo (quarterfinals)
2. (Lebanon) Hady Habib (first round)
3. (Brazil) João Lucas Reis da Silva (first round)
4. (Argentina) Facundo Díaz Acosta (quarterfinals)
5. (Bolivia) Juan Carlos Prado Ángelo (semifinals)
6. (Argentina) Nicolás Kicker (second round)
7. (Argentina) Lautaro Midón (final)
8. (Brazil) Pedro Boscardin Dias (first round)

== Draw ==
Key

- Q = Qualifier
- WC = Wild card
- LL = Lucky loser
- Alt = Alternate
- ITF = ITF entry
- PR = Protected ranking
- SR = Special ranking
- SE = Special exempt
- JE = Junior exempt
- JR = Junior Accelerator Programme entrant
- CO = College Accelerator Programme entrant
- NG = Next Gen Accelerator Program entrant
- w/o = Walkover
- r = Retired
- d = Defaulted

=== Finals ===
Semifinals
Q	(United States) Alafia Ayeni	3	1
(Argentina) Federico Agustín Gómez	6	6
5	(Bolivia) Juan Carlos Prado Ángelo	5	2
7	(Argentina) Lautaro Midón	7	6

Final
(Argentina) Federico Agustín Gómez	6	6
7	(Argentina) Lautaro Midón	4	1

=== Top half ===
First round
1	(Argentina) JM Cerúndolo	6	6
(France) A Ghibaudo	2	2
(Canada) JC Aguilar	3	2
(Germany) C Negritu	6	6
WC	(United States) Milledge Cossu	4	3
Q	(United States) A Ayeni	6	6
Q	(United States) N Schachter	2	3
6	(Argentina) N Kicker	6	6
4	(Argentina) F Díaz Acosta	6	6
WC	(Chile) Benjamín Torrealba	2	1
(United States) D Milavsky	6	4	2
(Brazil) E Ribeiro	4	6	6
WC	(Chile) Daniel Antonio Núñez	3	6	6
Q	(Brazil) Wilson Leite	6	1	2
(Argentina) FA Gómez	6	6
8	(Brazil) P Boscardin Dias	3	4

Second round
1	(Argentina) JM Cerúndolo	6	6
(Germany) C Negritu	3	4
Q	(United States) A Ayeni	6	6
6	(Argentina) N Kicker	4	3
4	(Argentina) F Díaz Acosta	7^{7}	6
(Brazil) E Ribeiro	6^{4}	4
WC	(Chile) DA Núñez	1	4
(Argentina) FA Gómez	6	6

Quarterfinals
1	(Argentina) JM Cerúndolo	4	6	3
Q	(United States) A Ayeni	6	4	6
4	(Argentina) F Díaz Acosta	6	4	2
(Argentina) FA Gómez	3	6	6

Semifinals
Q	(United States) A Ayeni	3	1
(Argentina) FA Gómez	6	6

=== Bottom half ===
First round
5	(Bolivia) JC Prado Ángelo	6	7^{7}
Q	(Chile) D Jarry Fillol	4	6^{4}
(Brazil) M Pucinelli de Almeida	4	2
(Argentina) G Villanueva	6	6
(Brazil) João Eduardo Schiessl	6^{4}	4
Q	(United States) Matt Kuhar	7^{7}	6
(Argentina) Carlos María Zárate	7^{7}	6
3	(Brazil) JL Reis da Silva	6^{4}	2
7	(Argentina) L Midón	6	6
(Ecuador) A Andrade	3	2
(United States) S Kirchheimer	7^{7}	6
(Brazil) D Dutra da Silva	6^{3}	2
(Argentina) JM La Serna	6	6^{2}	7
(United States) A Ganesan	4	7^{7}	5
Q	(Argentina) Lucio Ratti	7^{7}	3	6
2	(Lebanon) H Habib	6^{2}	6	3

Second round
5	(Bolivia) JC Prado Ángelo	6	4	7
(Argentina) G Villanueva	4	6	5
Q	(United States) M Kuhar	6	6
(Argentina) CM Zárate	2	2
7	(Argentina) L Midón	7^{7}	4	6
(United States) S Kirchheimer	6^{3}	6	3
(Argentina) JM La Serna	4	7	7
Q	(Argentina) L Ratti	6	5	5

Quarterfinals
5	(Bolivia) JC Prado Ángelo	7	3	6
Q	(United States) M Kuhar	5	6	2
7	(Argentina) L Midón	4	6	6
(Argentina) JM La Serna	6	3	3

Semifinals
5	(Bolivia) JC Prado Ángelo	5	2
7	(Argentina) L Midón	7	6
