= 2022 Challenger Temuco – Singles =

Singles
- 2022 Challenger Temuco

Final
- Champion: (Argentina) Guido Andreozzi
- Runner-up: (Argentina) Nicolás Kicker
- Score: 4–6, 6–4, 6–2

Events
Singles	Doubles
- Challenger Temuco

This was the first edition of the tournament.

Guido Andreozzi won the title after defeating Nicolás Kicker 4–6, 6–4, 6–2 in the final.

== Seeds ==
1. (Argentina) Facundo Bagnis (quarterfinals)
2. (Ecuador) Emilio Gómez (semifinals)
3. (Peru) Juan Pablo Varillas (withdrew)
4. (Argentina) Juan Pablo Ficovich (first round)
5. (Argentina) Santiago Rodríguez Taverna (first round)
6. (Argentina) Facundo Mena (first round)
7. (Argentina) Renzo Olivo (quarterfinals)
8. (Argentina) Nicolás Kicker (final)
9. (Dominican Republic) Nick Hardt (quarterfinals)

== Draw ==
Key

- Q = Qualifier
- WC = Wild card
- LL = Lucky loser
- Alt = Alternate
- ITF = ITF entry
- PR = Protected ranking
- SR = Special ranking
- SE = Special exempt
- JE = Junior exempt
- JR = Junior Accelerator Programme entrant
- CO = College Accelerator Programme entrant
- NG = Next Gen Accelerator Program entrant
- w/o = Walkover
- r = Retired
- d = Defaulted

=== Finals ===
Semifinals
8	(Argentina) Nicolás Kicker	6	6^{1}	6
(Colombia) Nicolás Mejía	2	7^{7}	3
Q	(Argentina) Guido Andreozzi	3	7	6
2	(Ecuador) Emilio Gómez	6	5	1

Final
8	(Argentina) Nicolás Kicker	6	4	2
Q	(Argentina) Guido Andreozzi	4	6	6

=== Top half ===
First round
1	(Argentina) F Bagnis	6	6
Q	(Argentina) T Lipovšek Puches	2	0
(Argentina) JB Torres	6	2
Q	(Argentina) Matías Zukas	0	1^{r}
(Brazil) JL Reis da Silva	6	5	6
WC	(Argentina) Juan Ignacio Galarza	4	7	3
(Peru) N Álvarez	2	5
8	(Argentina) N Kicker	6	7
9	(Dominican Republic) N Hardt	6	6
WC	(Chile) Nicolás Bruna	1	3
Q	(United States) A Ayeni	7^{8}	6
(Argentina) M Navone	6^{6}	4
(Argentina) RA Burruchaga	3	1
(Colombia) N Mejía	6	6
(Zimbabwe) B Lock	7^{7}	6
5	(Argentina) S Rodríguez Taverna	6^{3}	2

Second round
1	(Argentina) F Bagnis	6	6
(Argentina) JB Torres	3	2
(Brazil) JL Reis da Silva	6	4	3
8	(Argentina) N Kicker	3	6	6
9	(Dominican Republic) N Hardt	6	3	7
Q	(United States) A Ayeni	3	6	5
(Colombia) N Mejía	6	6
(Zimbabwe) B Lock	4	3

Quarterfinals
1	(Argentina) F Bagnis	0	2
8	(Argentina) N Kicker	6	6
9	(Dominican Republic) N Hardt	7^{7}	4	4
(Colombia) N Mejía	6^{1}	6	6

Semifinals
8	(Argentina) N Kicker	6	6^{1}	6
(Colombia) N Mejía	2	7^{7}	3

=== Bottom half ===
First round
6	(Argentina) F Mena	6	6^{0}	2
Q	(Argentina) G Andreozzi	2	7^{7}	6
(Argentina) TA Tirante	6	5
(Brazil) D Dutra da Silva	3	3^{r}
(Brazil) G Décamps	6	6
(Brazil) Wilson Leite	3	0
WC	(Argentina) Juan Bautista Otegui	7	6
4	(Argentina) JP Ficovich	5	2
7	(Argentina) R Olivo	7	1	6
Q	(Bolivia) F Zeballos	5	6	2
LL	(Jamaica) B Bicknell	4	2
(Portugal) J Domingues	6	6
Q	(Argentina) Tomás Farjat	6	6
(Argentina) G Villanueva	3	4
(Argentina) JP Paz	4	3
2	(Ecuador) E Gómez	6	6

Second round
Q	(Argentina) G Andreozzi	7^{7}	6^{7}	6
(Argentina) TA Tirante	6^{4}	7^{9}	4
(Brazil) G Décamps	6^{7}	4
WC	(Argentina) JB Otegui	7^{9}	6
7	(Argentina) R Olivo	6	7^{7}
(Portugal) J Domingues	2	6^{1}
Q	(Argentina) T Farjat	1	5
2	(Ecuador) E Gómez	6	7

Quarterfinals
Q	(Argentina) G Andreozzi	6	6
WC	(Argentina) JB Otegui	1	1
7	(Argentina) R Olivo	3	6	2
2	(Ecuador) E Gómez	6	3	6

Semifinals
Q	(Argentina) G Andreozzi	3	7	6
2	(Ecuador) E Gómez	6	5	1
