= 2025 Challenger Temuco – Doubles =

Doubles
- 2025 Challenger Temuco

Final
- Champions: (United States) Alafia Ayeni (United States) Daniel Milavsky
- Runners-up: (Canada) Juan Carlos Aguilar (Bolivia) Federico Zeballos
- Score: 6–7^{(6–8)}, 6–4, [10–6]

Events
Singles	Doubles
- Challenger Temuco

Christian Harrison and Evan King were the defending champions but chose not to defend their title.

Alafia Ayeni and Daniel Milavsky won the title after defeating Juan Carlos Aguilar and Federico Zeballos 6–7^{(6–8)}, 6–4, [10–6] in the final.

== Seeds ==
1. (Bolivia) Boris Arias / (Denmark) Johannes Ingildsen (semifinals)
2. (Peru) Alexander Merino / (Germany) Christoph Negritu (quarterfinals)
3. (Canada) Juan Carlos Aguilar / (Bolivia) Federico Zeballos (final)
4. (Brazil) Bruno Oliveira / (Argentina) Gonzalo Villanueva (quarterfinals)

== Draw ==
Key

- Q = Qualifier
- WC = Wild card
- LL = Lucky loser
- Alt = Alternate
- ITF = ITF entry
- PR = Protected ranking
- SR = Special ranking
- SE = Special exempt
- JE = Junior exempt
- JR = Junior Accelerator Programme entrant
- CO = College Accelerator Programme entrant
- NG = Next Gen Accelerator Program entrant
- w/o = Walkover
- r = Retired
- d = Defaulted

First round
4	(Brazil) Bruno Oliveira (Argentina) G Villanueva	6	6
WC	(Chile) Claudio Aravena (Chile) Sebastián Saffirio	0	1
(Chile) Benjamín Torrealba (Chile) Nicolás Villalón	2	5
(United States) A Ayeni (United States) D Milavsky	6	7
(Brazil) D Dutra da Silva (Brazil) M Pucinelli de Almeida	6	6
WC	(United States) Milledge Cossu (Chile) Anders Matta	2	3
(United States) P Kumar (United States) N Schachter	7	6
(Argentina) N Kicker (Argentina) Carlos María Zárate	5	3

Quarterfinals
1	(Bolivia) B Arias (Denmark) J Ingildsen	6	7
(United States) A Ganesan (United States) S Kirchheimer	3	5
4	(Brazil) B Oliveira (Argentina) G Villanueva	5	3
(United States) A Ayeni (United States) D Milavsky	7	6
(Brazil) D Dutra da Silva (Brazil) M Pucinelli de Almeida	6^{8}	6	[6]
3	(Canada) JC Aguilar (Bolivia) F Zeballos	7^{10}	1	[10]
(United States) P Kumar (United States) N Schachter	6	6
2	(Peru) A Merino (Germany) C Negritu	4	4

Semifinals
1	(Bolivia) B Arias (Denmark) J Ingildsen	6^{6}	7	[8]
(United States) A Ayeni (United States) D Milavsky	7^{8}	5	[10]
3	(Canada) JC Aguilar (Bolivia) F Zeballos	7^{7}	7^{7}
(United States) P Kumar (United States) N Schachter	6^{2}	6^{3}

Final
(United States) A Ayeni (United States) D Milavsky	6^{6}	6	[10]
3	(Canada) JC Aguilar (Bolivia) F Zeballos	7^{8}	4	[6]
