= 2022 Challenger Temuco – Doubles =

Doubles
- 2022 Challenger Temuco

Final
- Champions: (Argentina) Guido Andreozzi (Argentina) Guillermo Durán
- Runners-up: (Venezuela) Luis David Martínez (India) Jeevan Nedunchezhiyan
- Score: 6–4, 6–2

Events
Singles	Doubles
Challenger Temuco	· 2023 →

This was the first edition of the tournament.

Guido Andreozzi and Guillermo Durán won the title after defeating Luis David Martínez and Jeevan Nedunchezhiyan 6–4, 6–2 in the final.

== Seeds ==
1. (Argentina) Guido Andreozzi / (Argentina) Guillermo Durán (champions)
2. (Venezuela) Luis David Martínez / (India) Jeevan Nedunchezhiyan (final)
3. (Bolivia) Boris Arias / (Bolivia) Federico Zeballos (semifinals)
4. (Zimbabwe) Benjamin Lock / (Zimbabwe) Courtney John Lock (quarterfinals)

== Draw ==
Key

- Q = Qualifier
- WC = Wild card
- LL = Lucky loser
- Alt = Alternate
- ITF = ITF entry
- PR = Protected ranking
- SR = Special ranking
- SE = Special exempt
- JE = Junior exempt
- JR = Junior Accelerator Programme entrant
- CO = College Accelerator Programme entrant
- NG = Next Gen Accelerator Program entrant
- w/o = Walkover
- r = Retired
- d = Defaulted

First round
1	(Argentina) G Andreozzi (Argentina) G Durán	6	6
WC	(Chile) Daniel Antonio Núñez (Chile) Sebastián Santibáñez	3	4
(Argentina) Juan Ignacio Galarza (Argentina) T Lipovšek Puches	w/o
Alt	(Jamaica) B Bicknell (United States) Preston Brown
4	(Zimbabwe) B Lock (Zimbabwe) CJ Lock	w/o
(Colombia) N Mejía (Argentina) TA Tirante
(Argentina) Tomás Farjat (Argentina) Matías Zukas	6	5	[3]
(Argentina) R Olivo (Argentina) JP Paz	3	7	[10]
(Argentina) Juan Bautista Otegui (Chile) Miguel Fernando Pereira	2	3
3	(Bolivia) B Arias (Bolivia) F Zeballos	6	6
(Brazil) Wilson Leite (Brazil) JL Reis da Silva	4	5
WC	(Chile) Nicolás Bruna (Portugal) J Domingues	6	7
(Brazil) M Alves (United States) A Ayeni	4	2
2	(Venezuela) LD Martínez (India) J Nedunchezhiyan	6	6

Quarterfinals
1	(Argentina) G Andreozzi (Argentina) G Durán	6	6
(Argentina) JI Galarza (Argentina) T Lipovšek Puches	3	1
4	(Zimbabwe) B Lock (Zimbabwe) CJ Lock	6	3	[5]
(Argentina) R Olivo (Argentina) JP Paz	2	6	[10]
Alt	(Chile) Gonzalo Achondo (Chile) Cristóbal Castro	2	3
3	(Bolivia) B Arias (Bolivia) F Zeballos	6	6
WC	(Chile) N Bruna (Portugal) J Domingues	1	4
2	(Venezuela) LD Martínez (India) J Nedunchezhiyan	6	6

Semifinals
1	(Argentina) G Andreozzi (Argentina) G Durán	6	6
(Argentina) R Olivo (Argentina) JP Paz	3	1
3	(Bolivia) B Arias (Bolivia) F Zeballos	6	4	[3]
2	(Venezuela) LD Martínez (India) J Nedunchezhiyan	4	6	[10]

Final
1	(Argentina) G Andreozzi (Argentina) G Durán	6	6
2	(Venezuela) LD Martínez (India) J Nedunchezhiyan	4	2
