= 2023 Challenger Temuco – Doubles =

Doubles
- 2023 Challenger Temuco

Final
- Champions: (Brazil) Mateus Alves (Chile) Matías Soto
- Runners-up: (United States) Aleksandar Kovacevic (United States) Keegan Smith
- Score: 6–2, 7–5

Events
Singles	Doubles
← 2022 ·	Challenger Temuco	· 2024 →

Guido Andreozzi and Guillermo Durán were the defending champions but only Andreozzi chose to defend his title, partnering Ignacio Carou. Andreozzi withdrew before the start of the tournament due to a foot injury.

Mateus Alves and Matías Soto won the title after defeating Aleksandar Kovacevic and Keegan Smith 6–2, 7–5 in the final.

== Seeds ==
1. (Colombia) Nicolás Barrientos / (Sweden) André Göransson (quarterfinals)
2. (Bolivia) Boris Arias / (Bolivia) Federico Zeballos (semifinals)
3. (Argentina) Guido Andreozzi / (Uruguay) Ignacio Carou (withdrew)
4. (Argentina) Federico Agustín Gómez / (Venezuela) Luis David Martínez (first round)

== Draw ==
=== Key ===
- Q = Qualifier
- WC = Wild card
- LL = Lucky loser
- Alt = Alternate
- SE = Special exempt
- PR = Protected ranking
- ITF = ITF entry
- JE = Junior exempt
- w/o = Walkover
- r = Retired
- d = Defaulted
- SR = Special ranking

First round
1	(Colombia) N Barrientos (Sweden) A Göransson	4	6	[10]
(Zimbabwe) B Lock (New Zealand) R Statham	6	1	[5]
WC	(Ecuador) A Andrade (Venezuela) B Pérez	6	6^{5}	[4]
(Brazil) Gilbert Klier Júnior (Brazil) JL Reis da Silva	3	7^{7}	[10]
4	(Argentina) FA Gómez (Venezuela) LD Martínez	5	6	[9]
(United States) A Kovacevic (United States) K Smith	7	1	[11]
(Brazil) Wilson Leite (Brazil) M Pucinelli de Almeida	5	6	[10]
WC	(Chile) Alejandro Bancalari (Chile) Benjamín Herrera	7	2	[2]
(Brazil) L Britto (Brazil) PA Saraiva dos Santos	1	7	[10]
(Switzerland) L Margaroli (Argentina) S Rodríguez Taverna	6	5	[5]
(Brazil) M Alves (Chile) M Soto	6	6
Alt	(Jamaica) B Bicknell (The Bahamas) J Roberts	3	0
(Argentina) JP Paz (Brazil) Gabriel Roveri Sidney	3	4
(Argentina) M Kestelboim (Argentina) G Villanueva	6	6
(Peru) I Buse (Peru) C Huertas del Pino	2	4
2	(Bolivia) B Arias (Bolivia) F Zeballos	6	6

Quarterfinals
1	(Colombia) N Barrientos (Sweden) A Göransson	7^{10}	3	[8]
(Brazil) G Klier Júnior (Brazil) JL Reis da Silva	6^{8}	6	[10]
(United States) A Kovacevic (United States) K Smith	6	6
(Brazil) W Leite (Brazil) M Pucinelli de Almeida	3	4
(Brazil) L Britto (Brazil) PA Saraiva dos Santos	1	4
(Brazil) M Alves (Chile) M Soto	6	6
(Argentina) M Kestelboim (Argentina) G Villanueva	2	2
2	(Bolivia) B Arias (Bolivia) F Zeballos	6	6

Semifinals
(Brazil) G Klier Júnior (Brazil) JL Reis da Silva	4	3
(United States) A Kovacevic (United States) K Smith	6	6
(Brazil) M Alves (Chile) M Soto	2	7^{7}	[10]
2	(Bolivia) B Arias (Bolivia) F Zeballos	6	6^{4}	[5]

Final
(United States) A Kovacevic (United States) K Smith	2	5
(Brazil) M Alves (Chile) M Soto	6	7
