= 2022 Challenger Temuco =

- Date: 21–27 November
- Edition: 1st
- Surface: Hard
- Location: Temuco, Chile

Champions

Singles
- (Argentina) Guido Andreozzi

Doubles
- (Argentina) Guido Andreozzi / (Argentina) Guillermo Durán
Challenger Temuco	· 2023 →

The 2022 Challenger Temuco was a professional tennis tournament played on hard courts. It was the 1st edition of the tournament which was part of the 2022 ATP Challenger Tour. It took place in Temuco, Chile between 21 and 27 November 2022.

== Singles main-draw entrants ==
=== Seeds ===
Country	Player	Rank^{1}	Seed
ARG	Facundo Bagnis	103	1
ECU	Emilio Gómez	111	2
~~PER~~	~~Juan Pablo Varillas~~	~~119~~	~~3~~
ARG	Juan Pablo Ficovich	136	4
ARG	Santiago Rodríguez Taverna	169	5
ARG	Facundo Mena	177	6
ARG	Renzo Olivo	188	7
ARG	Nicolás Kicker	200	8
DOM	Nick Hardt	219	9

- ^{1} Rankings are as of 14 November 2022.

=== Other entrants ===
The following players received wildcards into the singles main draw:

- (Chile) Nicolás Bruna
- (Argentina) Juan Ignacio Galarza
- (Argentina) Juan Bautista Otegui

The following players received entry from the qualifying draw:

- (Argentina) Guido Andreozzi
- (United States) Alafia Ayeni
- (Argentina) Tomás Farjat
- (Argentina) Tomás Lipovšek Puches
- (Bolivia) Federico Zeballos
- (Argentina) Matías Zukas

The following player received entry as a lucky loser:

- (Jamaica) Blaise Bicknell

== Champions ==
=== Singles ===
- (Argentina) Guido Andreozzi def. (Argentina) Nicolás Kicker 4–6, 6–4, 6–2.

=== Doubles ===
- (Argentina) Guido Andreozzi / (Argentina) Guillermo Durán def. (Venezuela) Luis David Martínez / (India) Jeevan Nedunchezhiyan 6–4, 6–2.
