= 2024 Challenger Temuco =

- Date: 25 November – 1 December
- Edition: 3rd
- Surface: Hard
- Location: Temuco, Chile

Champions

Singles
- (Lebanon) Hady Habib

Doubles
- (United States) Christian Harrison / (United States) Evan King
- Challenger Temuco

The 2024 Challenger Temuco was a professional tennis tournament played on hard courts. It was the third edition of the tournament which was part of the 2024 ATP Challenger Tour. It took place in Temuco, Chile between 25 November and 1 December 2024.

== Singles main-draw entrants ==
=== Seeds ===
Country	Player	Rank^{1}	Seed
USA	Aleksandar Kovacevic	96	1
ARG	Francisco Comesaña	102	2
ARG	Camilo Ugo Carabelli	104	3
~~ARG~~	~~Thiago Agustín Tirante~~	~~123~~	~~4~~
CHI	Tomás Barrios Vera	162	5
ARG	Santiago Rodríguez Taverna	233	6
PER	Gonzalo Bueno	237	7
BRA	Mateus Alves	271	8

- ^{1} Rankings are as of 18 November 2024.

=== Other entrants ===
The following players received wildcards into the singles main draw:

- (Argentina) Francisco Comesaña
- (Germany) Diego Dedura-Palomero
- (Chile) Diego Fernández Flores

The following player received entry into the singles main draw using a protected ranking:

- (Argentina) Nicolás Kicker

The following players received entry into the singles main draw as alternates:

- (Argentina) Luciano Emanuel Ambrogi
- (Argentina) Lautaro Midón
- (Argentina) Gonzalo Villanueva

The following players received entry from the qualifying draw:

- (Brazil) Pedro Boscardin Dias
- (Argentina) Tomás Farjat
- (Peru) Conner Huertas del Pino
- (Argentina) Mariano Kestelboim
- (Brazil) Gilbert Klier Júnior
- (Greece) Stefanos Sakellaridis

The following player received entry as a lucky loser:

- (Brazil) Orlando Luz

== Champions ==
=== Singles ===
- (Lebanon) Hady Habib def. (Argentina) Camilo Ugo Carabelli 6–4, 6–7^{(3–7)}, 7–6^{(7–2)}.

=== Doubles ===
- (United States) Christian Harrison / (United States) Evan King def. (Zimbabwe) Benjamin Lock / (Argentina) Renzo Olivo 7–6^{(7–5)}, 7–5.
