= 2023 Texas Tennis Classic – Singles =

Singles
- 2023 Texas Tennis Classic

Final
- Champion: (United States) Aleksandar Kovacevic
- Runner-up: (France) Alexandre Müller
- Score: 6–3, 4–6, 6–2

Events
Singles	Doubles
- Texas Tennis Classic

This was the first edition of the tournament.

Aleksandar Kovacevic won the title after defeating Alexandre Müller 6–3, 4–6, 6–2 in the final.

== Seeds ==
1. (Australia) Jordan Thompson (withdrew)
2. (Australia) Rinky Hijikata (first round)
3. (United States) Aleksandar Kovacevic (champion)
4. (Italy) Mattia Bellucci (first round)
5. (Germany) Maximilian Marterer (first round)
6. (Croatia) Borna Gojo (semifinals)
7. (Chinese Taipei) Wu Tung-lin (first round)
8. (France) Alexandre Müller (final)

== Draw ==
Key

- Q = Qualifier
- WC = Wild card
- LL = Lucky loser
- Alt = Alternate
- ITF = ITF entry
- PR = Protected ranking
- SR = Special ranking
- SE = Special exempt
- JE = Junior exempt
- JR = Junior Accelerator Programme entrant
- CO = College Accelerator Programme entrant
- NG = Next Gen Accelerator Program entrant
- w/o = Walkover
- r = Retired
- d = Defaulted

=== Finals ===
Semifinals
SE	(United States) Alex Michelsen	3	0
8	(France) Alexandre Müller	6	6
3/WC	(United States) Aleksandar Kovacevic	6	7^{9}
6/SE	(Croatia) Borna Gojo	3	6^{7}

Final
8	(France) Alexandre Müller	3	6	2
3/WC	(United States) Aleksandar Kovacevic	6	4	6

=== Top half ===
First round
Q	(Austria) F Misolic	3	1
(Australia) A Vukic	6	6
Q	(Hong Kong) C Wong	3	1
(United States) M Krueger	6	6
Q	(United States) K Smith	3	4
PR	(Australia) A Bolt	6	6
SE	(United States) A Michelsen	6	6
5	(Germany) M Marterer	0	3
4	(Italy) M Bellucci	4	1
(South Korea) S-c Hong	6	6
(United States) Z Svajda	6^{7}	4
(Colombia) N Mejía	7^{9}	6
(Argentina) M Trungelliti	2	6	6
(Germany) D Koepfer	6	4	4
(Argentina) JP Ficovich	2	6	6^{8}
8	(France) A Müller	6	3	7^{10}

Second round
(Australia) A Vukic	6	6
(United States) M Krueger	3	4
PR	(Australia) A Bolt	2	3
SE	(United States) A Michelsen	6	6
(South Korea) S-c Hong	7	6
(Colombia) N Mejía	5	1
(Argentina) M Trungelliti	1	2
8	(France) A Müller	6	6

Quarterfinals
(Australia) A Vukic	4	4
SE	(United States) A Michelsen	6	6
(South Korea) S-c Hong	7^{9}	6^{1}	2
8	(France) A Müller	6^{7}	7^{7}	6

Semifinals
SE	(United States) A Michelsen	3	0
8	(France) A Müller	6	6

=== Bottom half ===
First round
7	(Chinese Taipei) T-l Wu	6	4	3
Q	(Tunisia) A Dougaz	3	6	6
(Portugal) G Elias	7^{7}	6
(France) E Couacaud	6^{4}	2
(Dominican Republic) N Hardt	6	6
WC	(United States) T Kodat	3	4
WC	(United States) R Harrison	3	6^{4}
3/WC	(United States) A Kovacevic	6	7^{7}
6/SE	(Croatia) B Gojo	6	6
(France) B Paire	3	4
Q	(United States) U Blanch	5	6	4
(Japan) S Shimabukuro	7	3	6
LL	(Germany) Elmar Ejupovic	0	3
(Canada) A Galarneau	6	6
Q	(Japan) S Mochizuki	3	7^{7}	7
2	(Australia) R Hijikata	6	6^{2}	5

Second round
Q	(Tunisia) A Dougaz	5	3
(Portugal) G Elias	7	6
(Dominican Republic) N Hardt	2	1
3/WC	(United States) A Kovacevic	6	6
6/SE	(Croatia) B Gojo	6	6^{5}	6
(Japan) S Shimabukuro	3	7^{7}	3
(Canada) A Galarneau	3	3
Q	(Japan) S Mochizuki	6	6

Quarterfinals
(Portugal) G Elias	5	5
3/WC	(United States) A Kovacevic	7	7
6/SE	(Croatia) B Gojo	6	4
Q	(Japan) S Mochizuki	2	0^{r}

Semifinals
3/WC	(United States) A Kovacevic	6	7^{9}
6/SE	(Croatia) B Gojo	3	6^{7}
