= 2025 ATP Hong Kong Tennis Open – Doubles =

Doubles
- 2025 ATP Hong Kong Tennis Open

Final
- Champions: (Netherlands) Sander Arends (United Kingdom) Luke Johnson
- Runners-up: Karen Khachanov; Andrey Rublev
- Score: 7–5, 4–6, [10–7]

Details
- Draw: 16 (2 WC )
- Seeds: 4

Events
Singles	Doubles
← 2024 ·	Hong Kong Open	· 2026 →

Sander Arends and Luke Johnson defeated Karen Khachanov and Andrey Rublev in the final, 7–5, 6–4, [10–7] to win the doubles tennis title at the 2025 ATP Hong Kong Tennis Open.

Marcelo Arévalo and Mate Pavić were the reigning champions, but both players decided not to participate this year.

== Seeds ==
1. (France) Sadio Doumbia / (France) Fabien Reboul (semifinals)
2. (Czech Republic) Adam Pavlásek / (Netherlands) Jean-Julien Rojer (first round)
3. (Tunisia) Skander Mansouri / (Belgium) Joran Vliegen (semifinals)
4. (India) Yuki Bhambri / (France) Albano Olivetti (quarterfinals)

== Draw ==
=== Key ===
- Q = Qualifier
- WC = Wild card
- LL = Lucky loser
- Alt = Alternate
- SE = Special exempt
- PR = Protected ranking
- ITF = ITF entry
- JE = Junior exempt
- w/o = Walkover
- r = Retired
- d = Defaulted
- SR = Special ranking

First round
1	(France) S Doumbia (France) F Reboul	6	6
(Spain) R Carballés Baena (France) A Müller	3	2
WC	(Belgium) Z Bergs (United States) L Tien	6^{5}	7^{9}	[11]
(Italy) L Darderi (United Kingdom) C Norrie	7^{7}	6^{7}	[9]
4	(India) Y Bhambri (France) A Olivetti	6	5	[10]
(Germany) C Frantzen (Germany) H Jebens	3	7	[5]
K Khachanov; A Rublev	6	6
WC	(South Korea) J-s Nam (Hong Kong) C Wong	1	4
(Spain) A Davidovich Fokina (France) A Fils	6	6
(Spain) P Martínez (Spain) J Munar	2	1
Alt	(Canada) G Diallo (Italy) F Passaro	3	6^{4}
3	(Tunisia) S Mansouri (Belgium) J Vliegen	6	7^{7}
(Italy) L Musetti (Italy) L Sonego	6	4	[7]
(Mexico) S González (Austria) L Miedler	4	6	[10]
(Netherlands) S Arends (United Kingdom) L Johnson	5	6	[10]
2	(Czech Republic) A Pavlásek (Netherlands) J-J Rojer	7	3	[5]

Quarterfinals
1	(France) S Doumbia (France) F Reboul	6	6
WC	(Belgium) Z Bergs (United States) L Tien	3	2
4	(India) Y Bhambri (France) A Olivetti	4	6^{5}
K Khachanov; A Rublev	6	7^{7}
(Spain) A Davidovich Fokina (France) A Fils
3	(Tunisia) S Mansouri (Belgium) J Vliegen	w/o
(Mexico) S González (Austria) L Miedler	6^{2}	5
(Netherlands) S Arends (United Kingdom) L Johnson	7^{7}	7

Semifinals
1	(France) S Doumbia (France) F Reboul	6^{3}	3
K Khachanov; A Rublev	7^{7}	6
3	(Tunisia) S Mansouri (Belgium) J Vliegen	6	3	[5]
(Netherlands) S Arends (United Kingdom) L Johnson	2	6	[10]

Final
K Khachanov; A Rublev	5	6	[7]
(Netherlands) S Arends (United Kingdom) L Johnson	7	4	[10]
