= 2025 Challenger Temuco =

- Date: 24 – 30 November
- Edition: 4th
- Surface: Hard
- Location: Temuco, Chile

Champions

Singles
- (Argentina) Federico Agustín Gómez

Doubles
- (United States) Alafia Ayeni / (United States) Daniel Milavsky
- Challenger Temuco

The 2025 Challenger Temuco was a professional tennis tournament played on hard courts. It was the fourth edition of the tournament which was part of the 2025 ATP Challenger Tour. It took place in Temuco, Chile between 24 and 30 November 2025.

== Singles main-draw entrants ==
=== Seeds ===
| Country | Player | Rank^{1} | Seed |
|---|---|---|---|
| ARG | Juan Manuel Cerúndolo | 85 | 1 |
| LBN | Hady Habib | 178 | 2 |
| BRA | João Lucas Reis da Silva | 187 | 3 |
| ARG | Facundo Díaz Acosta | 226 | 4 |
| BOL | Juan Carlos Prado Ángelo | 228 | 5 |
| ARG | Nicolás Kicker | 259 | 6 |
| ARG | Lautaro Midón | 262 | 7 |
| BRA | Pedro Boscardin Dias | 268 | 8 |

- ^{1} Rankings are as of 17 November 2025.

=== Other entrants ===
The following players received wildcards into the singles main draw:

- (United States) Milledge Cossu
- (Chile) Daniel Antonio Núñez
- (Chile) Benjamín Torrealba

The following players received entry from the qualifying draw:

- (United States) Alafia Ayeni
- (Chile) Diego Jarry Fillol
- (United States) Matt Kuhar
- (Brazil) Wilson Leite
- (Argentina) Lucio Ratti
- (United States) Noah Schachter

== Champions ==
=== Singles ===
- (Argentina) Federico Agustín Gómez def. (Argentina) Lautaro Midón 6–4, 6–1.

=== Doubles ===
- (United States) Alafia Ayeni / (United States) Daniel Milavsky def. (Canada) Juan Carlos Aguilar / (Bolivia) Federico Zeballos 6–7^{(6–8)}, 6–4, [10–6].
