= 2023 Grand Prix Hassan II – Singles =

Singles
- 2023 Grand Prix Hassan II

Final
- Champion: (Spain) Roberto Carballés Baena
- Runner-up: (France) Alexandre Müller
- Score: 4–6, 7–6^{(7–3)}, 6–2

Details
- Draw: 28 (4 Q / 3 WC )
- Seeds: 8

Events
Singles	Doubles
- Grand Prix Hassan II

Roberto Carballés Baena defeated Alexandre Müller in the final, 4–6, 7–6^{(7–3)}, 6–2 to win the men's singles tennis title at the 2023 Grand Prix Hassan II. It was his second ATP Tour singles title.

David Goffin was the reigning champion, but withdrew due to injury before the tournament.

== Seeds ==
The top four seeds received a bye into the second round.

1. (Italy) Lorenzo Musetti (quarterfinals)
2. (United Kingdom) Dan Evans (semifinals)
3. (Netherlands) Botic van de Zandschulp (second round)
4. (Netherlands) Tallon Griekspoor (quarterfinals)
5. (United States) Maxime Cressy (first round)
6. (France) Richard Gasquet (first round)
7. (France) Benjamin Bonzi (second round)
8. (Chile) Nicolás Jarry (first round)

== Draw ==
Key

- Q = Qualifier
- WC = Wild card
- LL = Lucky loser
- Alt = Alternate
- ITF = ITF entry
- PR = Protected ranking
- SR = Special ranking
- SE = Special exempt
- JE = Junior exempt
- JR = Junior Accelerator Programme entrant
- CO = College Accelerator Programme entrant
- NG = Next Gen Accelerator Program entrant
- w/o = Walkover
- r = Retired
- d = Defaulted

=== Finals ===
Semifinals
(France) Alexandre Müller	7^{7}	7
Pavel Kotov	6^{3}	5
(Spain) Roberto Carballés Baena	2	6	6
2	(United Kingdom) Dan Evans	6	4	2

Final
(France) Alexandre Müller	6	6^{3}	2
(Spain) Roberto Carballés Baena	4	7^{7}	6

=== Top half ===
First round
(France) H Gaston	3	6	7
(Germany) J-L Struff	6	4	5
A Karatsev	5	6	3
(Italy) F Passaro	7	3	6
(France) A Müller	6	6
6	(France) R Gasquet	4	4
Q	(Italy) R Bonadio	5	4
(Australia) C O'Connell	7	6
P Kotov	6	1	7^{7}
(Spain) P Martínez	2	6	6^{5}
LL	A Vatutin	3	3
7	(France) B Bonzi	6	6

Second round
1	(Italy) L Musetti	6	6
(France) H Gaston	2	3
(Italy) F Passaro	4	4
(France) A Müller	6	6
3	(Netherlands) B van de Zandschulp	7^{10}	4	0
(Australia) C O'Connell	6^{8}	6	6
P Kotov	6	7^{7}
7	(France) B Bonzi	0	6^{2}

Quarterfinals
1	(Italy) L Musetti	3	6	4
(France) A Müller	6	1	6
(Australia) C O'Connell	3	7^{8}	6^{3}
P Kotov	6	6^{6}	7^{7}

Semifinals
(France) A Müller	7^{7}	7
P Kotov	6^{3}	5

=== Bottom half ===
First round
5	(United States) M Cressy	7^{7}	3	1
(Spain) R Carballés Baena	6^{4}	6	6
Q	(Bulgaria) D Kuzmanov	6	6
LL	(France) H Grenier	3	4
WC	(Morocco) A Moundir	4	6^{6}
Q	(Sweden) E Ymer	6	7^{8}
8	(Chile) N Jarry	2	6	3
Q	(Italy) A Vavassori	6	3	6
(Spain) J Munar	6	6
WC	(Morocco) E Benchetrit	4	4
WC	(Morocco) Y Lalami Laaroussi	3	2
(Australia) A Popyrin	6	6

Second round
(Spain) R Carballés Baena	2
Q	(Bulgaria) D Kuzmanov	0^{r}
Q	(Sweden) E Ymer	6	3	4
4	(Netherlands) T Griekspoor	1	6	6
Q	(Italy) A Vavassori	6^{4}	7^{8}	6
(Spain) J Munar	7^{7}	6^{6}	4
(Australia) A Popyrin	1	3
2	(United Kingdom) D Evans	6	6

Quarterfinals
(Spain) R Carballés Baena	6	2	6
4	(Netherlands) T Griekspoor	3	6	2
Q	(Italy) A Vavassori	3	5
2	(United Kingdom) D Evans	6	7

Semifinals
(Spain) R Carballés Baena	2	6	6
2	(United Kingdom) D Evans	6	4	2

== Qualifying ==
=== Seeds ===
1. (France) Hugo Grenier (qualifying competition, lucky loser)
2. (Sweden) Elias Ymer (qualified)
3. (Czech Republic) Vít Kopřiva (first round)
4. (Italy) Riccardo Bonadio (qualified)
5. (United States) Nicolas Moreno de Alboran (qualifying competition)
6. (Bulgaria) Dimitar Kuzmanov (qualified)
7. (Italy) Andrea Vavassori (qualified)
8. (France) Arthur Cazaux (qualifying competition)

=== Qualifiers ===
1. (Bulgaria) Dimitar Kuzmanov
2. (Sweden) Elias Ymer
3. (Italy) Andrea Vavassori
4. (Italy) Riccardo Bonadio

=== Lucky losers ===
1. (France) Hugo Grenier
2. Alexey Vatutin

=== Qualifying draw ===
==== First qualifier ====
First round
1	(France) Hugo Grenier	7	7
(Bosnia and Herzegovina) Nerman Fatić	5	5
WC	(Morocco) Walid Ahouda	1	2
6	(Bulgaria) Dimitar Kuzmanov	6	6

Qualifying competition
1	(France) Hugo Grenier	3	6	0
6	(Bulgaria) Dimitar Kuzmanov	6	4	6

==== Second qualifier ====
First round
2	(Sweden) Elias Ymer	4	7^{7}	6
Alt	(France) Matteo Martineau	6	6^{3}	4
Alexey Vatutin	3	6	1
5	(United States) Nicolas Moreno de Alboran	6	4	6

Qualifying competition
2	(Sweden) Elias Ymer	7^{9}	6
5	(United States) Nicolas Moreno de Alboran	6^{7}	4

==== Third qualifier ====
First round
3	(Czech Republic) Vít Kopřiva	6^{4}	5
WC	(Morocco) Reda Bennani	7^{7}	7
(Bulgaria) Alexandar Lazarov	6^{2}	3
7	(Italy) Andrea Vavassori	7^{7}	6

Qualifying competition
WC	(Morocco) Reda Bennani	2	3
7	(Italy) Andrea Vavassori	6	6

==== Fourth qualifier ====
First round
4	(Italy) Riccardo Bonadio	6	7
(Spain) Pablo Andújar	2	5
(Czech Republic) Marek Gengel	3	1
8	(France) Arthur Cazaux	6	6

Qualifying competition
4	(Italy) Riccardo Bonadio	6	6^{1}	6
8	(France) Arthur Cazaux	4	7^{7}	3
