= 2025 ATP Hong Kong Tennis Open =

ATP tennis tournament

- Date: 30 December 2024–5 January 2025
- Edition: 29th
- Category: ATP Tour 250 series
- Draw: 28S / 16D
- Surface: Hard / outdoor
- Location: Hong Kong
- Venue: Victoria Park Tennis Stadium

Champions

Singles
- (France) Alexandre Müller

Doubles
- (Netherlands) Sander Arends / (United Kingdom) Luke Johnson
- Hong Kong Open (tennis)

The 2025 ATP Hong Kong Tennis Open (also known as the Bank of China Hong Kong Tennis Open for sponsorship reasons) was a men's tennis tournament played on outdoor hard courts. It was the 29th edition of the ATP Hong Kong Open, and part of the ATP 250 tournaments on the 2025 ATP Tour. It took place at the Victoria Park Tennis Stadium in Hong Kong, from 30 December 2024 to 5 January 2025.

== Champions ==
=== Singles ===
- (France) Alexandre Müller def (Japan) Kei Nishikori 2–6, 6–1, 6–3

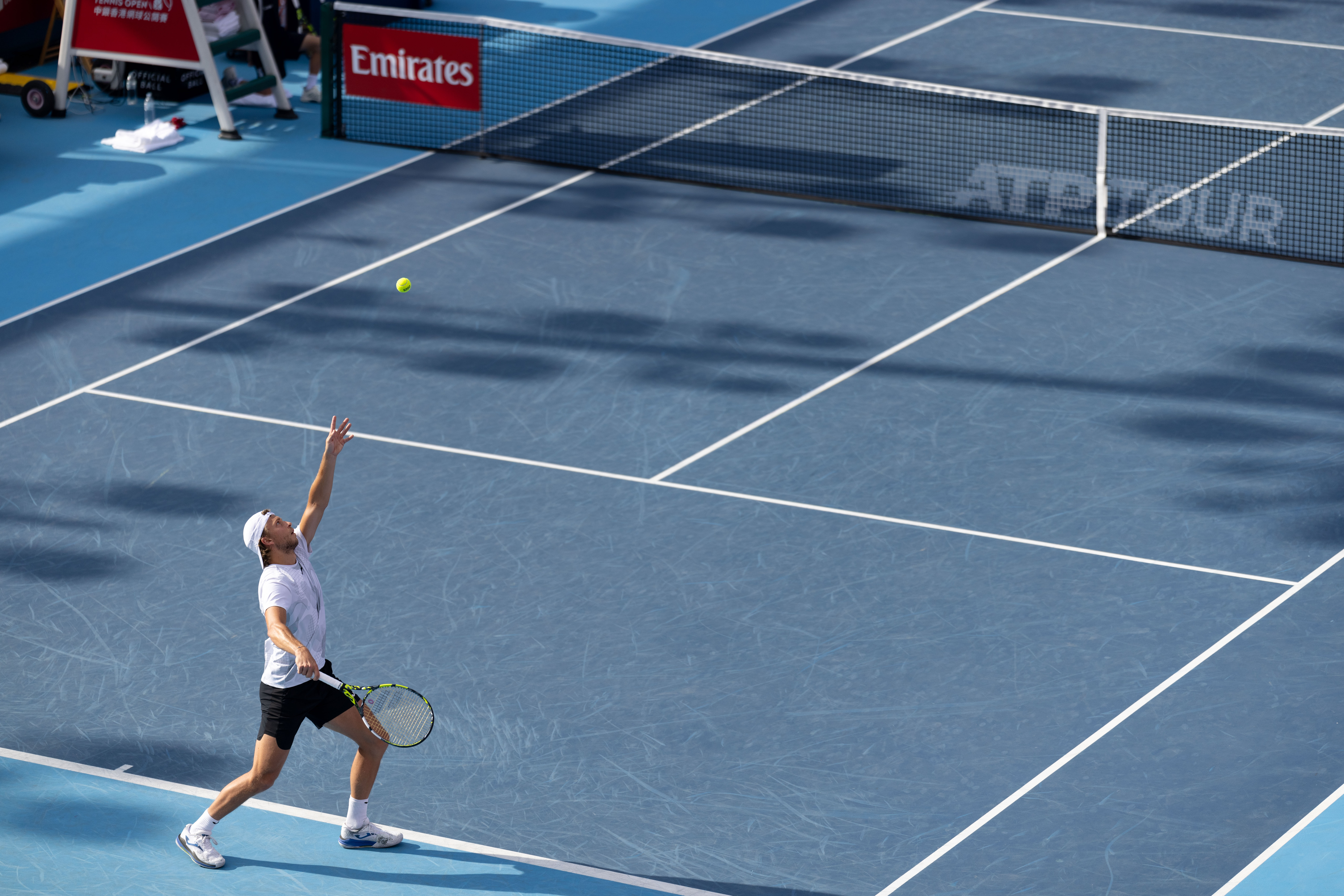
Alexandre Müller serving at the 2025 Hong Kong Open

=== Doubles ===
- (Netherlands) Sander Arends / (United Kingdom) Luke Johnson def. Karen Khachanov / Andrey Rublev 7–5, 4–6, [10–7]

== Singles main-draw entrants ==
=== Seeds ===
Country	Player	Rank^{1}	Seed
	Andrey Rublev	8	1
ITA	Lorenzo Musetti	17	2
	Karen Khachanov	19	3
FRA	Arthur Fils	20	4
POR	Nuno Borges	36	5
USA	Brandon Nakashima	38	6
ESP	Pedro Martínez	43	7
ITA	Luciano Darderi	44	8

- ^{1} Rankings are as of 23 December 2024.

=== Other entrants ===
The following players received wildcards into the singles main draw:

- (Belgium) Zizou Bergs
- (Japan) Kei Nishikori
- (Hong Kong) Coleman Wong

The following player received entry under the ATP Next Gen programme for players aged under 20 and ranked in the top 350:

- (United States) Learner Tien

The following players received entry from the qualifying draw:

- (Switzerland) Marc-Andrea Hüsler
- (Canada) Gabriel Diallo
- (Spain) Alejandro Moro Cañas
- (Italy) Francesco Passaro

=== Withdrawals ===
- (Netherlands) Tallon Griekspoor → replaced by (China) Bu Yunchaokete

== Doubles main-draw entrants ==
=== Seeds ===
Country	Player	Country	Player	Rank^{1}	Seed
FRA	Sadio Doumbia	FRA	Fabien Reboul	66	1
CZE	Adam Pavlásek	NED	Jean-Julien Rojer	75	2
TUN	Skander Mansouri	BEL	Joran Vliegen	87	3
IND	Yuki Bhambri	FRA	Albano Olivetti	92	4

- ^{1} Rankings are as of 23 December 2024

=== Other entrants ===
The following pairs received wildcards into the doubles main draw:

- (Belgium) Zizou Bergs / (United States) Learner Tien
- (South Korea) Nam Ji-sung / (Hong Kong) Coleman Wong

The following pair received entry into the doubles main draw as alternates:

- (Canada) Gabriel Diallo / (Italy) Francesco Passaro

=== Withdrawals ===
- (China) Shang Juncheng / (Canada) Denis Shapovalov → replaced by (Canada) Gabriel Diallo / (Italy) Francesco Passaro

== Points and prize money ==
=== Point distribution ===
Below is a series of tables for each competition showing the ranking points offered for each event.

==== Points ====
Event	W	F	SF	QF	Round of 16	Round of 28	Q	Q2	Q1
Singles	250	165	100	50	25	0	13	7	0
Doubles	250	150	90	45	0	N/A			

=== Prize money ===
The Hong Kong ATP Event total prize money for 2025 is $680,125, 2.8% more than last year’s event.

Event	W	F	SF	QF	Round of 16	Round of 28	Q2	Q1
Singles	$103,455	$60,350	$35,480	$20,555	$11,935	$7,295	$3,650	$1,990
Doubles*	$35,980	$19,330	$11,310	$6,270	$3,700	N/A		

* per team
