= 2023 Texas Tennis Classic =

- Date: 27 February – 5 March
- Edition: 1st
- Surface: Hard
- Location: Waco, Texas, United States

Champions

Singles
- (United States) Aleksandar Kovacevic

Doubles
- (Serbia) Ivan Sabanov / (Serbia) Matej Sabanov
Texas Tennis Classic	· 2024 →

The 2023 Texas Tennis Classic was a professional tennis tournament played on hard courts. It was the first edition of the tournament which was part of the 2023 ATP Challenger Tour. It took place in Waco, Texas, United States between 27 February and 5 March 2023.

== Singles main-draw entrants ==
=== Seeds ===
Country	Player	Rank^{1}	Seed
~~AUS~~	~~Jordan Thompson~~	~~93~~	~~1~~
AUS	Rinky Hijikata	117	2
USA	Aleksandar Kovacevic	124	3
ITA	Mattia Bellucci	149	4
GER	Maximilian Marterer	159	5
CRO	Borna Gojo	160	6
TPE	Wu Tung-lin	164	7
FRA	Alexandre Müller	170	8

- ^{1} Rankings are as of 20 February 2023.

=== Other entrants ===
The following players received wildcards into the singles main draw:

- (United States) Ryan Harrison
- (United States) Toby Kodat
- (United States) Aleksandar Kovacevic

The following players received entry into the singles main draw as special exempts:

- (Croatia) Borna Gojo
- (United States) Alex Michelsen

The following player received entry into the singles main draw using a protected ranking:

- (Australia) Alex Bolt

The following players received entry from the qualifying draw:

- (United States) Ulises Blanch
- (Tunisia) Aziz Dougaz
- (Austria) Filip Misolic
- (Japan) Shintaro Mochizuki
- (United States) Keegan Smith
- (Hong Kong) Coleman Wong

The following player received entry as a lucky loser:

- (Germany) Elmar Ejupovic

== Champions ==
=== Singles ===
- (United States) Aleksandar Kovacevic def. (France) Alexandre Müller 6–3, 4–6, 6–2.

=== Doubles ===
- (Serbia) Ivan Sabanov / (Serbia) Matej Sabanov def. (United States) Evan King / (United States) Mitchell Krueger 6–1, 3–6, [12–10].
