= 2025 ATP Hong Kong Tennis Open – Singles =

Singles
- 2025 ATP Hong Kong Tennis Open

Final
- Champion: (France) Alexandre Müller
- Runner-up: (Japan) Kei Nishikori
- Score: 2–6, 6–1, 6–3

Details
- Draw: 28 (4 Q / 3 WC )
- Seeds: 8

Events
Singles	Doubles
- Hong Kong Open

Alexandre Müller defeated Kei Nishikori in the final, 2–6, 6–1, 6–3 to win the singles tennis title at the 2025 ATP Hong Kong Tennis Open. It was his first ATP Tour singles title. Müller saved two match points in his second-round match against Miomir Kecmanović and became the third player in the Open Era to win a tour-level title after losing the first set in all of his matches, after Arthur Ashe (in 1975 WCT Finals) and Alexander Bublik (in 2024 Montpellier).

It was Nishikori's first ATP Tour final since the 2019 Brisbane International.

Andrey Rublev was the defending champion, but lost in the second round to Fábián Marozsán.

== Seeds ==
The top four seeds will receive a bye into the second round.

1. (Russia) Andrey Rublev (second round)
2. (Italy) Lorenzo Musetti (quarterfinals)
3. (Russia) Karen Khachanov (second round)
4. (France) Arthur Fils (quarterfinals)
5. (Portugal) Nuno Borges (second round)
6. (United States) Brandon Nakashima (first round)
7. (Spain) Pedro Martínez (second round)
8. (Italy) Luciano Darderi (first round)

== Draw ==
Key

- Q = Qualifier
- WC = Wild card
- LL = Lucky loser
- Alt = Alternate
- ITF = ITF entry
- PR = Protected ranking
- SR = Special ranking
- SE = Special exempt
- JE = Junior exempt
- JR = Junior Accelerator Programme entrant
- CO = College Accelerator Programme entrant
- NG = Next Gen Accelerator Program entrant
- w/o = Walkover
- r = Retired
- d = Defaulted

=== Finals ===
Semifinals
(China) Shang Juncheng	3^{r}
WC	(Japan) Kei Nishikori	4
(France) Alexandre Müller	4	7^{7}	6
(Spain) Jaume Munar	6	6^{5}	4

Final
WC	(Japan) Kei Nishikori	6	1	3
(France) Alexandre Müller	2	6	6

=== Top half ===
First round
R Safiullin	1	6^{9}
(Hungary) F Marozsán	6	7^{11}
(China) J Shang	7^{7}	6
WC	(Hong Kong) C Wong	6^{3}	4
Q	(Italy) F Passaro	4	4
7	(Spain) P Martínez	6	6
(Canada) D Shapovalov	2	3
WC	(Japan) K Nishikori	6	6
(United Kingdom) C Norrie	6	7
(United States) L Tien	3	5
(Italy) L Sonego	7^{7}	6
6	(United States) B Nakashima	6^{4}	3

Second round
1	A Rublev	5	6	3
(Hungary) F Marozsán	7	3	6
(China) J Shang	6	6
7	(Spain) P Martínez	3	1
3	K Khachanov	6	3	5
WC	(Japan) K Nishikori	4	6	7
(United Kingdom) C Norrie	6	4	6
(Italy) L Sonego	2	6	1

Quarterfinals
(Hungary) F Marozsán	6	3	4
(China) J Shang	1	6	6
WC	(Japan) K Nishikori	6	3	6
(United Kingdom) C Norrie	3	6	2

Semifinals
(China) J Shang	3^{r}
WC	(Japan) K Nishikori	4

=== Bottom half ===
First round
8	(Italy) L Darderi	3	3
(Serbia) M Kecmanović	6	6
(France) A Müller	2	6	6
Q	(Switzerland) M-A Hüsler	6	4	3
WC	(Belgium) Z Bergs	6	6
Q	(Spain) A Moro Cañas	4	4
5	(Portugal) N Borges	3	6	7^{8}
(China) Y Bu	6	3	6^{6}
(Spain) J Munar	4	6	6
(Spain) A Davidovich Fokina	6	3	3
Q	(Canada) G Diallo	4	7^{7}	7
(Spain) R Carballés Baena	6	6^{4}	5

Second round
(Serbia) M Kecmanović	7	6^{6}	6^{10}
(France) A Müller	5	7^{8}	7^{12}
WC	(Belgium) Z Bergs	6^{7}	4
4	(France) A Fils	7^{9}	6
5	(Portugal) N Borges	3	5
(Spain) J Munar	6	7
Q	(Canada) G Diallo	4	3
2	(Italy) L Musetti	6	6

Quarterfinals
(France) A Müller	3	6	6
4	(France) A Fils	6	3	1
(Spain) J Munar	2	7^{7}	7
2	(Italy) L Musetti	6	6^{4}	5

Semifinals
(France) A Müller	4	7^{7}	6
(Spain) J Munar	6	6^{5}	4

== Qualifying ==
=== Seeds ===
1. Pavel Kotov (qualifying competition)
2. (Canada) Gabriel Diallo (qualified)
3. (Germany) Daniel Altmaier (first round)
4. (Italy) Francesco Passaro (qualified)
5. (Serbia) Laslo Djere (first round)
6. (Argentina) Juan Manuel Cerúndolo (first round)
7. (Chile) Cristian Garín (first round)
8. (France) Hugo Grenier (qualifying competition)

=== Qualifiers ===
1. (Switzerland) Marc-Andrea Hüsler
2. (Canada) Gabriel Diallo
3. (Spain) Alejandro Moro Cañas
4. (Italy) Francesco Passaro

=== Qualifying draw ===
==== First qualifier ====
First round
1	Pavel Kotov	3	7	7^{7}
(France) Valentin Royer	6	5	6^{5}
(Switzerland) Marc-Andrea Hüsler	7	6
5	(Serbia) Laslo Djere	5	4

Qualifying competition
1	Pavel Kotov	6^{7}	4
(Switzerland) Marc-Andrea Hüsler	7^{9}	6

==== Second qualifier ====
First round
2	(Canada) Gabriel Diallo	7^{7}	6
WC	(Hong Kong) Ng Ki-lung	6^{2}	2
(France) Térence Atmane	6	3	4
8	(France) Hugo Grenier	3	6	6

Qualifying competition
2	(Canada) Gabriel Diallo	4	6	7
8	(France) Hugo Grenier	6	1	5

==== Third qualifier ====
First round
3	(Germany) Daniel Altmaier	4	3
(Spain) Alejandro Moro Cañas	6	6
WC	(China) Cui Jie	6	6
6	(Argentina) Juan Manuel Cerúndolo	2	4

Qualifying competition
(Spain) Alejandro Moro Cañas	6	6
WC	(China) Cui Jie	2	3

==== Fourth qualifier ====
First round
4	(Italy) Francesco Passaro	7	4	6
(Tunisia) Aziz Dougaz	5	6	3
(Kazakhstan) Denis Yevseyev	6	2	6
7	(Chile) Cristian Garín	4	6	2

Qualifying competition
4	(Italy) Francesco Passaro	4	6	6
(Kazakhstan) Denis Yevseyev	6	2	4
