= 2023 Grand Prix Hassan II – Doubles =

Doubles
- 2023 Grand Prix Hassan II

Final
- Champions: (Brazil) Marcelo Demoliner (Italy) Andrea Vavassori
- Runners-up: (Austria) Alexander Erler (Austria) Lucas Miedler
- Score: 6–4, 3–6, [12–10]

Events
Singles	Doubles
- Grand Prix Hassan II

Marcelo Demoliner and Andrea Vavassori defeated Alexander Erler and Lucas Miedler in the final, 6–4, 3–6, [12–10] to win the doubles tennis title at the 2023 Grand Prix Hassan II.

Rafael Matos and David Vega Hernández were the reigning champions, but chose not to compete this year.

== Seeds ==
1. (Spain) Marcel Granollers / (Netherlands) Matwé Middelkoop (first round)
2. (Colombia) Juan Sebastián Cabal / (Colombia) Robert Farah (withdrew)
3. (Austria) Alexander Erler / (Austria) Lucas Miedler (final)
4. (France) Jérémy Chardy / (France) Fabrice Martin (first round)
5. (United States) Maxime Cressy / (France) Albano Olivetti (semifinals)

== Draw ==
Key

- Q = Qualifier
- WC = Wild card
- LL = Lucky loser
- Alt = Alternate
- ITF = ITF entry
- PR = Protected ranking
- SR = Special ranking
- SE = Special exempt
- JE = Junior exempt
- JR = Junior Accelerator Programme entrant
- CO = College Accelerator Programme entrant
- NG = Next Gen Accelerator Program entrant
- w/o = Walkover
- r = Retired
- d = Defaulted

=== Draw ===
First round
1	(Spain) M Granollers (Netherlands) M Middelkoop	4	6^{1}
(India) S Balaji (India) J Nedunchezhiyan	6	7^{7}
(Netherlands) T Griekspoor (Netherlands) B van de Zandschulp	6	5	[10]
(Serbia) I Sabanov (Serbia) M Sabanov	4	7	[5]
4	(France) J Chardy (France) F Martin	4	7	[9]
(Brazil) M Demoliner (Italy) A Vavassori	6	5	[11]
(Spain) P Martínez (Spain) J Munar	3	4
(Netherlands) S Arends (Pakistan) A-u-H Qureshi	6	6
(United Kingdom) D Evans (United Kingdom) J O'Mara	3	2
(Czech Republic) R Jebavý (Czech Republic) A Pavlásek	6	6
(Chile) N Jarry (Venezuela) LD Martínez	5	3
3	(Austria) A Erler (Austria) L Miedler	7	6
WC	(Morocco) E Benchetrit (Morocco) A Moundir	6	6
WC	(Morocco) H El Amine (Morocco) Y Lalami Laaroussi	4	1
Alt	(Germany) H Jebens (Greece) Pe Tsitsipas	3	6^{5}
5	(United States) M Cressy (France) A Olivetti	6	7^{7}

Quarterfinals
(India) S Balaji (India) J Nedunchezhiyan	7^{7}	4	[10]
(Netherlands) T Griekspoor (Netherlands) B van de Zandschulp	6^{3}	6	[8]
(Brazil) M Demoliner (Italy) A Vavassori	7^{12}	6
(Netherlands) S Arends (Pakistan) A-u-H Qureshi	6^{10}	3
(Czech Republic) R Jebavý (Czech Republic) A Pavlásek	6	1	[11]
3	(Austria) A Erler (Austria) L Miedler	4	6	[13]
WC	(Morocco) E Benchetrit (Morocco) A Moundir	4	3
5	(United States) M Cressy (France) A Olivetti	6	6

Semifinals
(India) S Balaji (India) J Nedunchezhiyan	6	3	[3]
(Brazil) M Demoliner (Italy) A Vavassori	3	6	[10]
3	(Austria) A Erler (Austria) L Miedler	6	7^{7}
5	(United States) M Cressy (France) A Olivetti	2	6^{1}

Final
(Brazil) M Demoliner (Italy) A Vavassori	6	3	[12]
3	(Austria) A Erler (Austria) L Miedler	4	6	[10]
