= 2023 Grand Prix Hassan II =

- Date: 3–9 April
- Edition: 37th
- Draw: 28S / 16D
- Prize money: €562,815
- Surface: Clay / outdoor
- Location: Marrakesh, Morocco

Champions

Singles
- (Spain) Roberto Carballés Baena

Doubles
- (Brazil) Marcelo Demoliner / (Italy) Andrea Vavassori
- Grand Prix Hassan II

The 2023 Grand Prix Hassan II was a professional tennis tournament played in Marrakesh, Morocco on clay courts. It was the 37th edition of the tournament and was classified as an ATP Tour 250 event on the 2023 ATP Tour. It took place from 3 to 9 April 2023.

== Champions ==
=== Singles ===
- (Spain) Roberto Carballés Baena def. (France) Alexandre Müller, 4–6, 7–6^{(7–3)}, 6–2

=== Doubles ===
- (Brazil) Marcelo Demoliner / (Italy) Andrea Vavassori def. (Austria) Alexander Erler / (Austria) Lucas Miedler, 6–4, 3–6, [12–10]

== Point and prize money ==
=== Point ===
Event	W	F	SF	QF	Round of 16	Round of 32	Q	Q2	Q1
Singles	250	150	90	45	20	0	12	6	0
Doubles	250	150	90	45	0	—N/a	—N/a	—N/a	—N/a

=== Prize money ===
Event	W	F	SF	QF	Round of 16	Round of 32	Q2	Q1
Singles	€85,605	€49,940	€29,355	€17,010	€9,880	€6,035	€3,020	€1,645
Doubles*	€29,740	€15,910	€9,330	€5,220	€3,070	—N/a	—N/a	—N/a

_{*per team}

== Singles main draw entrants ==
=== Seeds ===
Country	Player	Rank^{†}	Seed
ITA	Lorenzo Musetti	21	1
GBR	Dan Evans	29	2
NED	Botic van de Zandschulp	32	3
NED	Tallon Griekspoor	36	4
USA	Maxime Cressy	37	5
FRA	Richard Gasquet	40	6
FRA	Benjamin Bonzi	49	7
CHI	Nicolás Jarry	57	8

^{†} Rankings are as of 20 March 2023

=== Other entrants ===
The following players received wildcard entry into the singles main draw:

- (Morocco) Elliot Benchetrit
- (Morocco) Younes Lalami Laaroussi
- (Morocco) Adam Moundir

The following players received entry from qualifying draw:

- (Italy) Riccardo Bonadio
- (Bulgaria) Dimitar Kuzmanov
- (Italy) Andrea Vavassori
- (Sweden) Elias Ymer

The following players received entry as lucky losers:

- (France) Hugo Grenier
- Alexey Vatutin

=== Withdrawals ===
- (Argentina) Federico Coria → replaced by (France) Hugo Grenier
- (Serbia) Laslo Đere → replaced by (Italy) Francesco Passaro
- (Belgium) David Goffin → replaced by (Spain) Pedro Martínez
- (France) Ugo Humbert → replaced by (Germany) Jan-Lennard Struff
- Ilya Ivashka → replaced by Pavel Kotov
- (Slovakia) Alex Molčan → replaced by (Australia) Alexei Popyrin
- (France) Arthur Rinderknech → replaced by (France) Alexandre Müller
- (Peru) Juan Pablo Varillas → replaced by Alexey Vatutin

== Doubles main draw entrants ==
=== Seeds ===
Country	Player	Country	Player	Rank^{1}	Seed
ESP	Marcel Granollers	NED	Matwé Middelkoop	38	1
~~COL~~	~~Juan Sebastián Cabal~~	~~COL~~	~~Robert Farah~~	~~47~~	~~2~~
AUT	Alexander Erler	AUT	Lucas Miedler	88	3
FRA	Jérémy Chardy	FRA	Fabrice Martin	136	4
USA	Maxime Cressy	FRA	Albano Olivetti	138	5

- Rankings are as of 20 March 2023

=== Other entrants ===
The following pairs received wildcards into the doubles main draw:

- (Morocco) Elliot Benchetrit / (Morocco) Adam Moundir
- (Morocco) Hamza El Amine / (Morocco) Younes Lalami Laaroussi

The following pair received entry as alternates:

- (Germany) Hendrik Jebens / (Greece) Petros Tsitsipas

=== Withdrawals ===
- (Colombia) Juan Sebastián Cabal / (Colombia) Robert Farah → replaced by (Germany) Hendrik Jebens / (Greece) Petros Tsitsipas
- (Argentina) Máximo González / (Argentina) Andrés Molteni → replaced by (Netherlands) Sander Arends / (Pakistan) Aisam-ul-Haq Qureshi
- Ilya Ivashka / (Chile) Nicolás Jarry → replaced by (Chile) Nicolás Jarry / (Venezuela) Luis David Martínez
- (France) Nicolas Mahut / (France) Édouard Roger-Vasselin → replaced by (Serbia) Ivan Sabanov / (Serbia) Matej Sabanov
