= Texas Tennis Classic =

- 2023 Texas Tennis Classic

ATP Challenger Tour
- Event name: Texas Tennis Classic
- Location: Waco, Texas, United States
- Venue: Hurd Tennis Center
- Category: ATP Challenger Tour
- Surface: Hard

The Texas Tennis Classic was a professional tennis tournament played on hardcourts. It was part of the Association of Tennis Professionals (ATP) Challenger Tour. It was held in Waco, Texas, United States in 2023.

== Past finals ==
=== Singles ===
Year	Champion	Runner-up	Score
2023	(United States) Aleksandar Kovacevic	(France) Alexandre Müller	6–3, 4–6, 6–2

=== Doubles ===
Year	Champions	Runners-up	Score
2023	(Serbia) Ivan Sabanov (Serbia) Matej Sabanov	(United States) Evan King (United States) Mitchell Krueger	6–1, 3–6, [12–10]
