= Diego Jarry Fillol =

Chilean tennis player (born 2003)

- Country (sports): United States (2021); Chile (2023–)
- Born: 11 February 2003 (age 23) Santiago, Chile
- Height: 1.96 m (6 ft 5 in)
- Plays: Right-handed (one-handed backhand)
- College: University of North Carolina at Chapel Hill
- Prize money: US $6,566

Singles
- Career record: 0–0 (at ATP Tour level, Grand Slam level, and in Davis Cup)
- Career titles: 0
- Highest ranking: No. 1,339 (4 May 2026)
- Current ranking: No. 1,339 (4 May 2026)

Doubles
- Career record: 0–1 (at ATP Tour level, Grand Slam level, and in Davis Cup)
- Career titles: 0
- Highest ranking: No. 1,423 (23 June 2025)
- Current ranking: No. 1,594 (4 May 2026)
- Last updated on: 5 May 2026.

Diego Jarry Fillol Spanish pronunciation: [djeɣoˈɟʝari fiˈʎol]; born 11 February 2003) is a Chilean tennis player. He has a career-high ATP singles ranking of No. 1,339 achieved on 4 May 2026 and a doubles ranking of No. 1,423 reached on 23 June 2025. In 2021, he represented the United States.

== Early life ==
Jarry Fillol began to engage seriously with tennis at approximately 15 years of age, having previously prioritized other sports, including football. His subsequent development was shaped by factors such as foot injuries, the disruption of competition during the COVID-19 pandemic, and his collegiate studies at the University of North Carolina at Chapel Hill, which contributed to a more gradual transition toward a professional tennis career.

In 2013, when Rafael Nadal visited Chile to compete in the Viña del Mar ATP tournament, the ten-year-old Diego had the opportunity to practice briefly with him.

== Career ==
In the main draw of the 2025 Challenger Temuco, Jarry Fillol lost in the first round to fifth seed Juan Carlos Prado Ángelo, after having earned his first ATP points by advancing through qualifying.

He made his ATP main draw debut at the 2026 Chile Open in the doubles draw partnering his brother Nicolás. They lost in the first round to Gonzalo Escobar and Jean-Julien Rojer in a closely contested match, 7–5, 7–6(10), during which they squandered three set points in the second set. It was the first time the two brothers competed together in a doubles match.

== Personal life ==
Jarry Fillol regularly communicates with his older brother Nicolás through messages or video calls to seek advice on tennis-related situations, describing him as a helpful influence despite limited face-to-face interaction.

He is also the grandson of Jaime Fillol, a former ATP player who won seven titles, and the great-nephew of Álvaro Fillol. His uncle, Jaime Fillol Jr., also played professionally, and his aunt, Catalina Fillol, is the tournament director of the Chile Open in Santiago, Chile. Another uncle, Martín Rodríguez, represented Argentina on the professional tour. His cousin, Martín Sáenz, is a track and field athlete who specializes in the 110 metre hurdles.
