= Alexandre Müller =

French tennis player (born 1997)

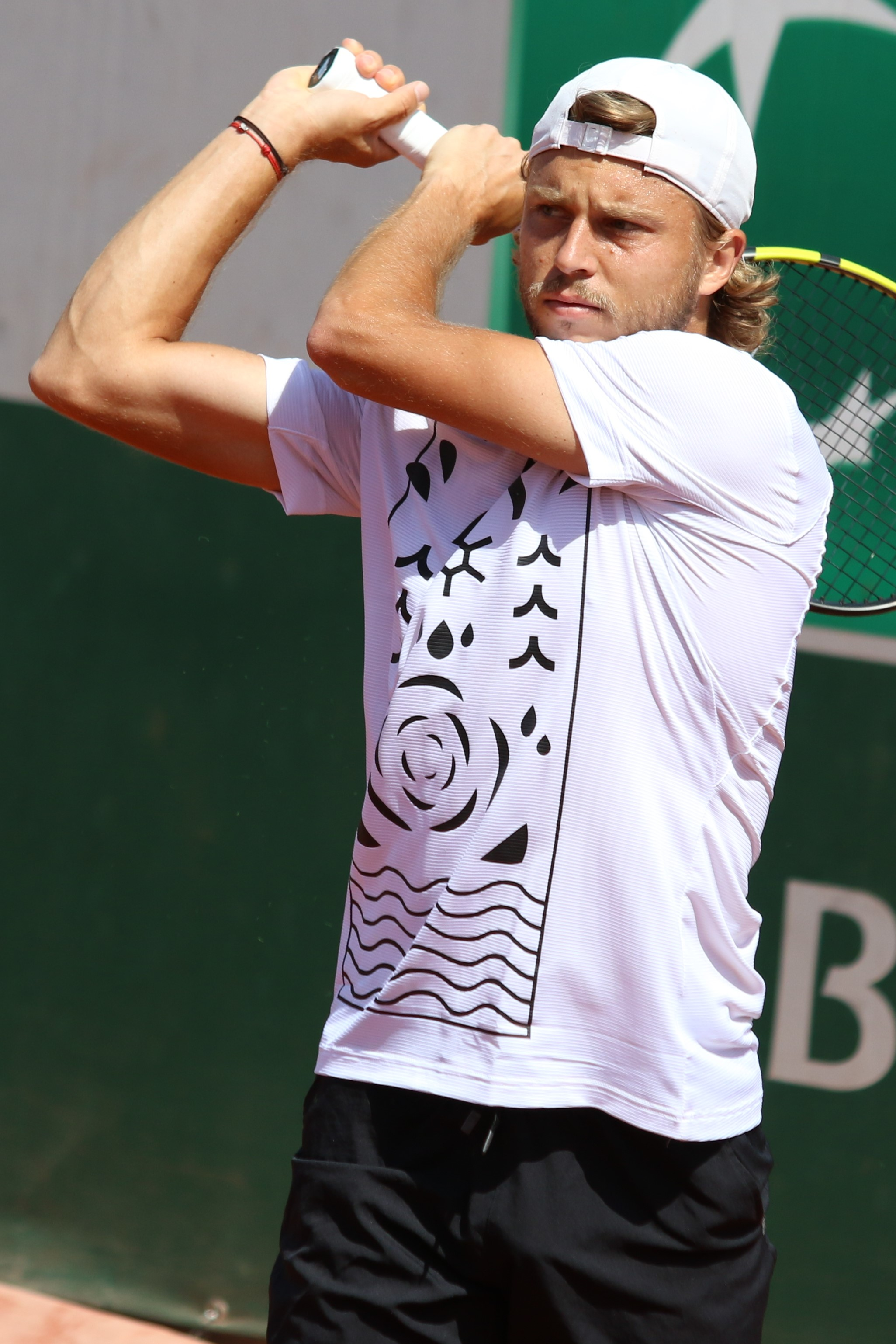
- Müller at the 2022 French Open
- Country (sports): France
- Born: 1 February 1997 (age 29) Poissy, France
- Height: 1.83 m (6 ft 0 in)
- Turned pro: 2014
- Plays: Right-handed (two-handed backhand)
- Coach: Xavier Pujo
- Prize money: US $4,445,436

Singles
- Career record: 55–79
- Career titles: 1
- Highest ranking: No. 38 (18 August 2025)
- Current ranking: No. 132 (31 August 2026)

Grand Slam singles results
- Australian Open: 2R (2021, 2026)
- French Open: 2R (2024)
- Wimbledon: 2R (2023, 2024)
- US Open: 2R (2024)

Doubles
- Career record: 7–28
- Career titles: 0
- Highest ranking: No. 263 (25 November 2024)
- Current ranking: No. 437 (31 August 2026)

Grand Slam doubles results
- Australian Open: 2R (2024)
- French Open: 1R (2018, 2024, 2025, 2026)
- Wimbledon: 1R (2024, 2025)
- US Open: 1R (2023, 2024, 2025)
Medal record
Men's tennis
Representing France
Mediterranean Games
Gold medal – first place	2018 Tarragona	Doubles
- Last updated on: 31 August 2026.

Alexandre Müller (French pronunciation: [alɛksɑ̃dʁ mylɛʁ]; born 1 February 1997) is a French professional tennis player. He has a career-high ATP singles ranking of world No. 38, achieved on 18 August 2025 and a doubles ranking of No. 263, achieved on 25 November 2024.

In 2023, Müller made his breakthrough on the ATP Tour after reaching his first tour final in Marrakesh, which earned him his top 100 debut in April 2023. In 2025, he won his maiden title in Hong Kong.

Müller has won 17 total singles and doubles titles across both the ITF and the ATP Challenger Tours.

== Personal life ==
Müller has Crohn’s disease.

== Professional career ==
=== 2017–2019: Grand Slam debut ===
Müller made his ATP main draw debut at the 2017 French Open after receiving a wildcard to the singles main draw. He was defeated by Thiago Monteiro in the first round. He qualified for the 2019 French Open but lost in the first round to Roberto Carballés Baena.

=== 2021: First Grand Slam win, top 200 debut ===
At the 2021 Australian Open Müller won his first Grand Slam match as a lucky loser defeating Juan Ignacio Londero. As a result, he entered the top 200 at a career-high of World No. 194 on 22 February 2021.

=== 2022: First Challenger title, top 150 debut ===
In June, Müller won his first Challenger tournament in Blois, France, defeating Nikola Milojević. A month later, he made his top 150 debut on 25 July 2022 at world No. 149.

=== 2023: First ATP final, top 100 and Masters debuts ===
At the 2023 Qatar ExxonMobil Open in Doha, Müller as a qualifier reached his first ATP quarterfinal in his career, defeating Nikoloz Basilashvili and eighth seed Botic van de Zandschulp. He lost to Andy Murray.

At the 2023 Grand Prix Hassan II he reached a second quarterfinal defeating sixth seed Richard Gasquet and Francesco Passaro. Next he defeated top seed Lorenzo Musetti to reach his first ATP semifinal in a close to two hours match. He then faced Russian Pavel Kotov, defeating him also in two hours in straight sets to reach his first ATP final, before losing to Roberto Carballés Baena. As a result he secured a new career high singles ranking into the top 100 at world No. 96 on 10 April 2023. He made his Masters debut at the 2023 Italian Open as a qualifier and recorded his first win defeating Kyle Edmund. Müller reached a new career-high ranking of No. 82 on 26 June 2023, following his first title at a Challenger 125 level at the 2023 Emilia-Romagna Open in Montechiarugolo, Italy, defeating Francesco Maestrelli. He made his debut at Wimbledon, defeating compatriot Arthur Rinderknech in the first round for his second win in a Major. He then lost to top seed Carlos Alcaraz.

At the US Open, Müller faced second seed Novak Djokovic in the first round, losing in straight sets. He received a wildcard for the main draw of the 2023 Rolex Paris Masters.

=== 2024: First top 10 win, Masters fourth round ===
In January, following a quarterfinal showing as a qualifier at the 2024 ASB Classic where he defeated compatriot Benjamin Bonzi and third seed Francisco Cerúndolo, Müller reached the top 75 in the rankings on 15 January 2024. In February, Muller lost to Andy Murray in the first round of the ATP Qatar Open. This was Andy Murray's first victory since October 2023.

In May, Müller reached the fourth round of a Masters at the Italian Open for the first time in his career by defeating Márton Fucsovics, compatriot and 31st seed Arthur Fils, and fourth seed Andrey Rublev, having reached the main draw as a qualifier. The win against Rublev ended the Madrid champion seven-match winning streak and was his first career win against a top 10 player. As a result he made it back to the top 100 climbing close to 20 positions up in the rankings. He lost to Nicolás Jarry in the fourth round. In June, Müller reached his first Challenger final in a year in Lyon, losing to top seed Hugo Gaston in the final. In July, he won his first Challenger title in more than a year in San Marino, defeating Tseng Chun-hsin in the final.

Müller received a wildcard for the main draw of the US Open, where he reached the second round, recording his first win at the tournament over Adam Walton. He lost to fourth seed Alexander Zverev. In October, Müller reached the third round at a Masters for the second time in his career at the Shanghai Masters, defeating Luca Nardi in the first round and eighteenth seed Félix Auger-Aliassime in the second round before losing to tenth seed Stefanos Tsitsipas in the third round.

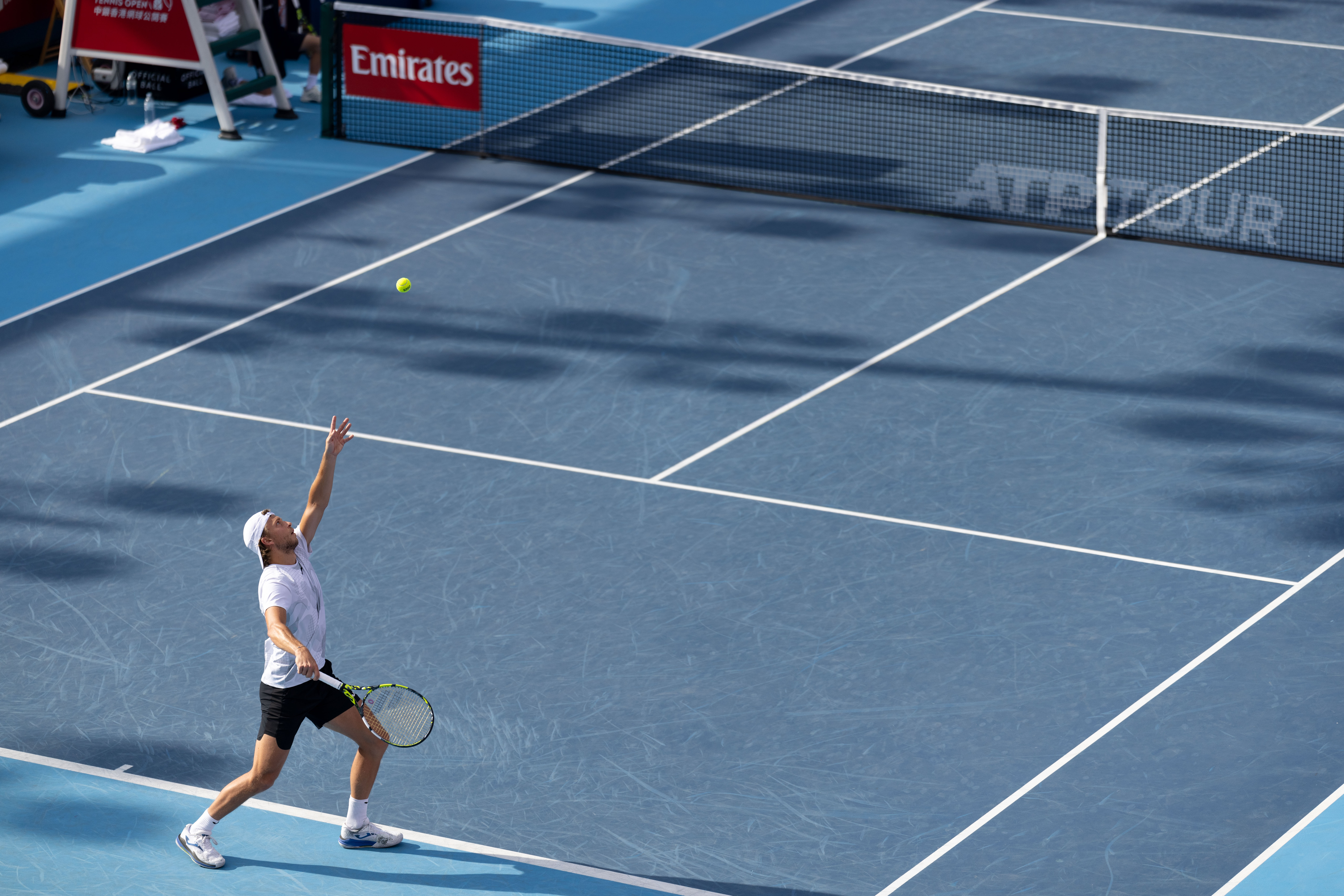
Alexandre Müller serving at the 2025 ATP Hong Kong Tennis Open

=== 2025: Maiden ATP title, ATP 500 final, top 40 ===
In January, Müller won his maiden ATP title at the Hong Kong Open defeating Kei Nishikori in the final.

In February, Müller reached his first ATP 500 final at the Rio Open defeating João Fonseca and three Argentine players, with upsets of eighth seed Tomás Martín Etcheverry and fourth seed Francisco Cerúndolo, and Francisco Comesana, and setting his record to 15-1 in his past 16 encounters against Argentines across all levels (10-0 on clay). As a result he entered the Top 50 on 24 February 2024. Next he setup a meeting in the final with defending champion Sebastián Báez, after becoming the first Frenchman to reach the Rio title round, which he lost in straight sets. Ranked No. 41, Müller lost for a second time to Novak Djokovic in the first round at Wimbledon.

== Performance timeline ==
Key
W	F	SF	QF	#R	RR	Q#	P#	DNQ	A	Z#	PO	G	S	B	NMS	NTI	P	NH

(W) winner; (F) finalist; (SF) semifinalist; (QF) quarterfinalist; (#R) rounds 4, 3, 2, 1; (RR) round-robin stage; (Q#) qualification round; (DNQ) did not qualify; (A) absent; (NH) not held; (SR) strike rate (events won / competed); (W–L) win–loss record.
To avoid confusion and double counting, these charts are updated at the conclusion of a tournament or when the player's participation has ended.

=== Singles ===
Current through the 2026 Australian Open.

Tournament	2017	2018	2019	2020	2021	2022	2023	2024	2025	2026	SR	W–L	Win%
Australian Open	A	A	A	Q1	2R	Q1	Q3	1R	1R	2R	0 / 3	2–4	25%
French Open	1R	Q3	1R	Q2	Q1	Q2	1R	2R	1R		0 / 5	1–5	17%
Wimbledon	A	A	A	NH	Q1	Q2	2R	2R	1R		0 / 3	2–3	40%
US Open	A	A	A	A	Q1	Q1	1R	2R	1R		0 / 3	1–3	25%
Win–loss	0–1	0–0	0–1	0–0	1–1	0–0	1–3	3–4	0–4	1-1	0 / 14	6–15	26%
ATP Masters 1000 tournaments
Indian Wells Masters	A	A	A	NH	A	A	Q2	2R	1R	0 / 2	1–2	33%	
Miami Open	A	A	A	NH	A	A	A	1R	2R	0 / 2	1–2	33%	
Monte-Carlo Masters	A	A	A	NH	A	A	A	Q2	2R	0 / 1	1–1	50%	
Madrid Open	A	A	A	NH	A	A	Q1	Q1	3R	0 / 1	2–1	67%	
Italian Open	A	A	A	A	A	A	2R	4R	2R	0 / 3	5–3	63%	
Canadian Open	A	A	A	NH	A	A	A	A	3R	0 / 1	1–1	50%	
Cincinnati Open	A	A	A	A	A	A	Q1	A	1R	0 / 1	0–1	0%	
Shanghai Masters	A	A	A	NH			1R	3R	1R	0 / 3	2–3	40%	
Paris Masters	A	A	A	A	A	A	1R	Q1		0 / 1	0–1	0%	
Win–loss	0–0	0–0	0–0	0–0	0–0	0–0	1–3	6–4	6–8	0 / 15	13–15	46%	

== ATP Tour finals ==
=== Singles: 3 (1 title, 2 runner-ups) ===
Legend Grand Slam (0–0) ATP 1000 (0–0) ATP 500 (0–1) ATP 250 (1–1)	Finals by surface Hard (1–0) Clay (0–2) Grass (0–0)	Finals by setting Outdoor (1–2) Indoor (0–0)

Result	W–L	Date	Tournament	Tier	Surface	Opponent	Score
Loss	0–1	Apr 2023	Grand Prix Hassan II, Morocco	ATP 250	Clay	(Spain) Roberto Carballés Baena	6–4, 6–7^{(3–7)}, 2–6
Win	1–1	Jan 2025	Hong Kong Open, China SAR	ATP 250	Hard	(Japan) Kei Nishikori	2–6, 6–1, 6–3
Loss	1–2	Feb 2025	Rio Open, Brazil	ATP 500	Clay	(Argentina) Sebastián Báez	2–6, 3–6

== ATP Challenger Tour finals ==
=== Singles: 6 (3 titles, 3 runner-ups) ===
Legend ATP Challenger Tour (3–3)	Finals by surface Hard (0–2) Clay (3–1)

Result	W–L	Date	Tournament	Tier	Surface	Opponent	Score
Loss	0–1	Sep 2019	Murray Trophy, United Kingdom	Challenger	Hard (i)	(Finland) Emil Ruusuvuori	3–6, 1–6
Win	1–1	Jun 2022	Internationaux de Blois, France	Challenger	Clay	(Serbia) Nikola Milojević	7–6^{(7-3)}, 6–1
Loss	1–2	Feb 2023	Texas Tennis Classic, US	Challenger	Hard	(United States) Aleksandar Kovacevic	3–6, 6–4, 2–6
Win	2–2	Jun 2023	Emilia-Romagna Open, Italy	Challenger	Clay	(Italy) Francesco Maestrelli	6–1, 6–4
Loss	2–3	Jun 2024	Open Steria de Lyon, France	Challenger	Clay	(France) Hugo Gaston	2–6, 6–1, 1–6
Win	3–3	Jul 2024	San Marino Open	Challenger	Clay	(Chinese Taipei) Chun-Hsin Tseng	6–3, 4–6, 7–6^{(7-3)}

=== Doubles: 3 (2 titles, 1 runner-up) ===
Legend ATP Challenger Tour (2–1)

Result	W–L	Date	Tournament	Tier	Surface	Partner	Opponents	Score
Win	1–0	Jun 2019	Internationaux de Blois, France	Challenger	Clay	(France) Corentin Denolly	(Peru) Sergio Galdós (Sweden) Andreas Siljeström	7–5, 6–7^{(5–7)}, [10–6]
Loss	1–1	Feb 2022	Bengaluru Open, India	Challenger	Hard	(France) Hugo Grenier	(India) Saketh Myneni (India) Ramkumar Ramanathan	3-6, 2-6
Win	2–1	Apr 2022	Sanremo Challenger, Italy	Challenger	Clay	(France) Geoffrey Blancaneaux	(Italy) Flavio Cobolli (Italy) Matteo Gigante	4–6, 6–3, [11–9]

== ITF Futures/World Tennis Tour finals ==
=== Singles: 21 (7 titles, 14 runner-ups) ===
Legend ITF Futures/WTT (7–14)	Finals by surface Hard (2–8) Clay (5–6)

Result	W–L	Date	Tournament	Tier	Surface	Opponent	Score
Loss	0–1	Nov 2015	Tunisia F32, Port El Kantaoui	Futures	Hard	(Serbia) Nikola Milojević	2–6, 3–6
Loss	0–2	Mar 2016	Egypt F8, Sharm El Sheikh	Futures	Hard	(Serbia) Marko Tepavac	6–7^{(3–7)}, 1–6
Loss	0–3	May 2016	Algeria F1, Oran	Futures	Clay	(France) Sadio Doumbia	6–4, 4–6, 4–6
Loss	0–4	Jun 2016	North Macedonia F1, Skopje	Futures	Clay	(Serbia) Danilo Petrović	3–6, 6–4, 6–7^{(6–8)}
Win	1–4	Jul 2016	North Macedonia F2, Skopje	Futures	Clay	(North Macedonia) Dimitar Grabul	6–2, 6–4
Loss	1–5	Aug 2016	Morocco F6, Tangier	Futures	Clay	(France) Maxime Hamou	3–6, 6–4, 2–6
Loss	1–6	Oct 2016	Croatia F9, Bol	Futures	Clay	(Italy) Riccardo Bellotti	4–6, 1–6
Loss	1–7	Nov 2016	Greece F8, Heraklion	Futures	Hard	(Czech Republic) Václav Šafránek	5–7, 4–6
Win	2–7	Nov 2016	Cyprus F2, Limassol	Futures	Hard	(Austria) Lucas Miedler	6–2, 6–2
Loss	2–8	Dec 2016	Israel F17, Ramat Gan	Futures	Hard	(France) David Guez	7–5, 5–7, 3–6
Loss	2–9	Feb 2017	Indonesia F3, Jakarta	Futures	Hard	(Germany) Sebastian Fanselow	1–6, 3–6
Loss	2–10	May 2017	France F10, Grasse	Futures	Clay	(France) Corentin Moutet	4–6, 3–6
Win	3–10	Jul 2017	Poland F3, Mrągowo	Futures	Clay	(Sweden) Markus Eriksson	6–3, 0–6, 6–3
Win	4–10	Jul 2017	France F16, Uriage-les-Bains	Futures	Clay	(France) Corentin Denolly	5–7, 7–6^{(7–1)}, 6–4
Win	5–10	Oct 2017	Tunisia F32, Hammamet	Futures	Clay	(Spain) Guillermo Olaso	4–6, 6–3, 6–3
Loss	5–11	Mar 2018	Tunisia F8, Djerba	Futures	Hard	(Tunisia) Moez Echargui	6–7^{(5–7)}, 6–2, 1–6
Loss	5–12	Sep 2018	Lebanon F1, Jounieh	Futures	Clay	(Spain) Jordi Samper Montaña	3–6, 4–6
Win	6–12	Oct 2018	Lebanon F2, Jounieh	Futures	Clay	(France) Fabien Reboul	6–7^{(2–7)}, 6–3, 6–4
Loss	6–13	Dec 2018	Tunisia F42, Monastir	Futures	Hard	(Russia) Aslan Karatsev	4–6, 6–4, 1–6
Loss	6–14	Oct 2019	M25 Tavira, Portugal	WTT	Hard	(Portugal) Frederico Ferreira Silva	2–6, 1–6
Win	7–14	Nov 2019	M25 Monastir, Tunisia	WTT	Hard	(Cyprus) Petros Chrysochos	3–6, 7–6 ^{(7-5)}, 6–2

=== Doubles: 13 (6 titles, 7 runner-ups) ===
Legend ITF Futures (6–7)	Finals by surface Hard (1–3) Clay (5–4)

Result	W–L	Date	Tournament	Tier	Surface	Partner	Opponents	Score
Loss	0–1	Oct 2015	Greece F8, Heraklion	Futures	Hard	(France) Corentin Denolly	(United Kingdom) Lloyd Glasspool (United Kingdom) Joshua Ward-Hibbert	walkover
Win	1–1	Jan 2016	France F1, Bagnoles-de-l'Orne	Futures	Clay (i)	(France) Corentin Denolly	(France) Benjamin Bonzi (France) Grégoire Jacq	2–6, 6–1, [10–6]
Win	2–1	May 2016	Algeria F1, Oran	Futures	Clay	(France) Fabien Reboul	(Spain) Adrià Mas Mascolo (Spain) Pol Toledo Bagué	6–4, 6–4
Win	3–1	May 2016	Algeria F2, Algiers	Futures	Clay	(France) Grégoire Jacq	(Venezuela) Jordi Muñoz Abreu (France) Fabien Reboul	6–4, 6–3
Loss	3–2	Jul 2016	Italy F20, Formigine-Casinalbo	Futures	Clay	(Germany) Pirmin Hänle	(Italy) Riccardo Balzerani (Italy) Enrico Dalla Valle	3–6, 3–6
Loss	3–3	Aug 2016	Morocco F5, Tangier	Futures	Clay	(France) Gianni Mina	(Belgium) Sander Gillé (France) Antoine Hoang	4–6, 6–7^{(7–9)}
Loss	3–4	Aug 2016	Morocco F6, Tangier	Futures	Clay	(France) Gianni Mina	(Portugal) Felipe Cunha e Silva (Italy) Julian Ocleppo	3–6, 3–6
Loss	3–5	Nov 2016	Greece F8, Heraklion	Futures	Hard	(France) Florent Diep	(Switzerland) Adrian Bodmer (Germany) Jakob Sude	2–6, 1–6
Loss	3–6	Dec 2016	Cyprus F3, Larnaca	Futures	Hard	(Russia) Markos Kalovelonis	(Austria) Lucas Miedler (Austria) Maximilian Neuchrist	3–6, 6–1, [5–10]
Win	4–6	Jan 2017	Egypt F1, Sharm El Sheikh	Futures	Hard	(France) Antoine Escoffier	(Switzerland) Adrian Bodmer (Germany) Jakob Sude	6–2, 3–6, [11–9]
Win	5–6	Jul 2017	Belgium F4, Lasne	Futures	Clay	(France) Corentin Denolly	(France) Maxence Brovillé (France) Clément Tabur	6–1, 6–3
Win	6–6	Jul 2017	France F16, Uriage-les-Bains	Futures	Clay	(France) Corentin Denolly	(Switzerland) Antoine Bellier (France) Johan Sébastien Tatlot	6–3, 7–5
Loss	6–7	May 2018	France F9, Grasse	Futures	Clay	(France) Corentin Denolly	(France) Clément Tabur (France) Hugo Gaston	2–6, 4–6

== Wins against Top 10 players ==
- Müller has a 3–11 record against players who were ranked in the top 10 at the time the match was played.

Season	2024	2025	Total
Wins	1	2	3

#	Player	Rk	Event	Surface	Rd	Score	Rk
2024
1.	Andrey Rublev	6	Italian Open, Italy	Clay	3R	3–6, 6–3, 6–2	109
2025
2.	(Germany) Alexander Zverev	3	Hamburg Open, Germany	Clay	2R	6–3, 4–6, 7–6^{(7–5)}	40
3.	Karen Khachanov	10	China Open, China	Hard	1R	4–6, 7–6^{(7–5)}, 6–4	38

* As of 25 September 2025.
