= Aleksandar Kovacevic (tennis) =

American tennis player (born 1998)

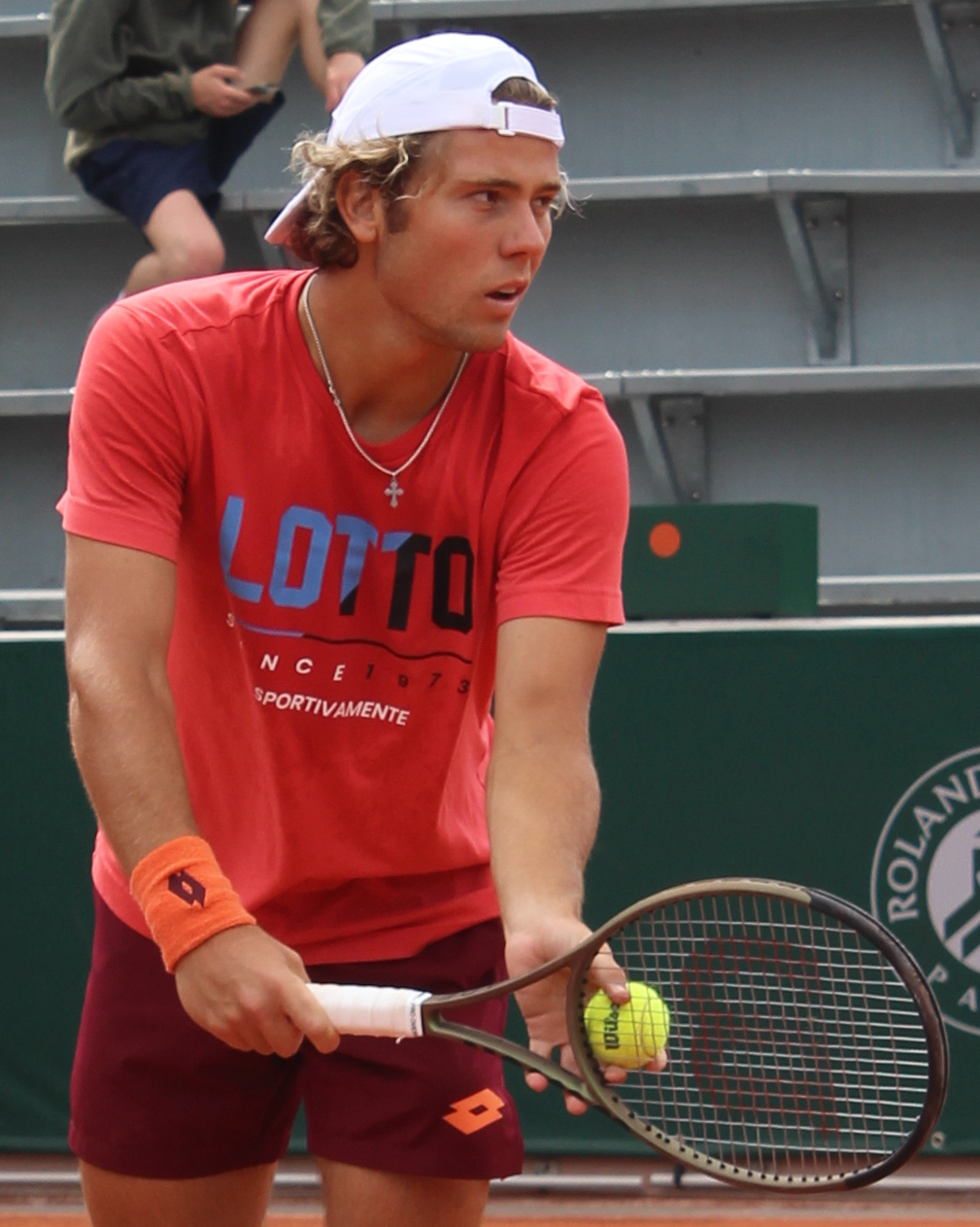
- Kovacevic at the 2023 French Open
- Country (sports): United States
- Born: August 29, 1998 (age 28) New York City, US
- Height: 6 ft 0 in (1.83 m)
- Turned pro: 2021
- Plays: Right-handed (one-handed backhand)
- College: Illinois
- Coach: Damion Jackson; David Witt (2026-)
- Prize money: US $3,449,302

Singles
- Career record: 44–78
- Career titles: 0
- Highest ranking: No. 54 (January 12, 2026)
- Current ranking: No. 83 (November 9, 2026)

Grand Slam singles results
- Australian Open: 2R (2024)
- French Open: 1R (2023, 2024, 2025, 2026)
- Wimbledon: 1R (2024, 2025, 2026)
- US Open: 1R (2024, 2025, 2026)

Doubles
- Career record: 7–7
- Career titles: 0
- Highest ranking: No. 94 (September 28, 2026)
- Current ranking: No. 94 (September 28, 2026)

Grand Slam doubles results
- Wimbledon: SF (2026)
- US Open: 2R (2026)

Grand Slam mixed doubles results
- US Open: SF (2024)
- Last updated on: September 29, 2026.

Aleksandar Kovacevic (born August 29, 1998) is an American professional tennis player. He has a career-high ATP singles ranking of world No. 54 achieved on January 12, 2026 and a best doubles ranking of No. 94, reached on September 28, 2026.

== Early life and background ==
Kovacevic was born in New York City, to parents Milanka from Bosnia and Milan from Serbia. They played table tennis and met on the Ping Pong tour during a tournament in their teenage years. In the 1990s, his family emigrated from Yugoslavia to the United States, where his father, Milan, studied computer science at UCLA and then worked at Columbia University.

Kovacevic started taking tennis lessons in his childhood and rapidly took part in junior tournaments. Kovacevic cites the 2005 US Open match between Novak Djokovic and Gaël Monfils, which he watched on Court 10 at Flushing Meadows, as the reason why he began playing tennis.

Kovacevic earned a finance degree from the University of Illinois, while playing on the men's tennis team from 2016-21. He was a two-time ITA All-American, and three-time All-Big Ten first team selection.

== Professional career ==
=== 2021: Turned Pro, Grand Slam qualifying debut ===
Kovacevic made his Grand Slam qualifying debut at the 2021 US Open, where he advanced to the final round before falling to Argentine Marco Trungelliti.

=== 2022: ATP debut, first win and semifinal, Top 200 ===
Kovacevic made his Top 250 debut on July 25, 2022, as world No. 227 following a final showing at the 2022 Indy Challenger.

Kovacevic made his ATP main draw debut at the 2022 Korea Open, where he entered as a lucky loser. He recorded his first ATP tour level win by defeating Miomir Kecmanović in the first round. Next he defeated Tseng Chun-hsin to reach his first ATP quarterfinal and Mackenzie McDonald to reach his first ATP semifinal. As a result, he climbed 55 positions and reached No. 167 on October 3, 2022.

=== 2023: First Challenger win, Major and Masters debuts, top 125 ===
Kovacevic reached the top 125 on 6 February 2023, following his first Challenger title at the 2023 Cleveland Open. At the 2023 Delray Beach Open, he received a wildcard for his second ATP tour event, losing in the first round to Michael Mmoh.

In March, he won his second Challenger title at the 2023 Texas Tennis Classic in Waco, Texas as a wildcard. He made his Masters 1000 debut at the 2023 BNP Paribas Open as a wildcard. He reached the main draw at the 2023 Miami Open as a lucky loser and recorded his first Masters win against Jaume Munar.

Kovacevic entered the 2023 U.S. Men's Clay Court Championships as a direct entry. He was accepted as a direct entry at the 2023 French Open, making his Grand Slam debut where he played Novak Djokovic. He defeated qualifier Omni Kumar and then world No. 13 Cameron Norrie in the second round of the 2023 Los Cabos Open for the biggest win of his career, to reach the quarterfinals, where he lost to Dominik Koepfer.

Kovacevic qualified at the Masters 1000 at the 2023 Rolex Shanghai Masters on his debut but lost to Chilean Cristian Garín. He won his third Challenger title at the 2023 Shenzhen Longhua Open, defeating Portuguese Nuno Borges. He also reached the semifinals at the new 2023 Shenzhen Luohu Challenger but lost after a walkover.

=== 2024: Australian Open debut and first major win, top 75 ===
Kovacevic qualified for the 2024 Australian Open making his debut at this major and recorded his first win in five sets over Chilean Alejandro Tabilo. As a result, he moved into the top 85 in the singles rankings.

Kovacevic entered the 2024 Delray Beach Open as a wildcard and the following week qualified for the 2024 Los Cabos Open where in the latter, he reached back-to-back quarterfinals at this tournament. He also qualified for his first ATP 500 tournament, the 2024 Abierto Mexicano Telcel and defeated Los Cabos champion, Australian Jordan Thompson.

The American also received an invitation for the 2024 BNP Paribas Open. At the next Masters, the 2024 Miami Open, he reached the main draw after qualifying.

At the 2024 U.S. Men's Clay Court Championships, he recorded his first victory on clay in 3 hours and 16 minutes, the longest first round and tied for second-longest recorded match in the Houston tournament history, over another Australian, Thanasi Kokkinakis. In the next round, he met sixth seed Jordan Thompson again, losing in three sets in the longest recorded match in the tournament history lasting 3 hours and 34 minutes, with two tiebreaks in the last two sets.

At the ATP 500 Citi DC Open in Washington, he reached the round of 16, defeating Atlanta champion Yoshihito Nishioka and 11th seed Roberto Carballés Baena and moved into the top 80 in the rankings on 5 August 2024 and to the top 75 two weeks later.

=== 2025–2026: ATP 250 finals & 500 semifinal ===
In January, Kovacevic won the Oeiras Indoors II Challenger, defeating Zsombor Piros in the final. He qualified for the main-draw at the Open Occitanie in Montpellier, France, and went on to defeat top seed and world No. 10 Andrey Rublev in the last four to reach his first ATP Tour final, where he lost to Canadian second seed Félix Auger-Aliassime in a deciding set tiebreak.

In July, Kovacevic reached his second ATP Tour final at the Los Cabos Open, defeating again top seed and world No. 10 Andrey Rublev in the last four. He lost to another Canadian, Denis Shapovalov, in the final. As a result, he reached a new career-high ranking of world No. 66 on 21 July 2025.

Kovacevic reached the semifinal of an ATP 500 at the 2026 Hamburg Open as a lucky loser upsetting top seed Felix Auger-Aliassime and Camilo Ugo Carabelli. Kovacevic became the first American to reach the quarterfinals in Hamburg since Andre Agassi, and then the semifinals since Pete Sampras in 1995.

== Performance timeline ==
Key
W	F	SF	QF	#R	RR	Q#	DNQ	A	NH

(W) winner; (F) finalist; (SF) semifinalist; (QF) quarterfinalist; (#R) rounds 4, 3, 2, 1; (RR) round-robin stage; (Q#) qualification round; (DNQ) did not qualify; (A) absent; (NH) not held; (SR) strike rate (events won / competed); (W–L) win–loss record.
To avoid confusion and double counting, these charts are updated at the conclusion of a tournament or when the player's participation has ended.

=== Singles ===
Tournament	2021	2022	2023	2024	2025	2026	SR	W–L	Win%
Grand Slam tournaments
Australian Open	A	A	Q1	2R	Q2	1R	0 / 2	1–2	33%
French Open	A	A	1R	1R	1R	1R	0 / 4	0–4	0%
Wimbledon	A	A	Q3	1R	1R	1R	0 / 3	0–3	0%
US Open	Q3	Q1	Q2	1R	1R	1R	0 / 3	0–3	0%
Win–loss	0–0	0–0	0–1	1–4	0–3	0–4	0 / 12	1–12	8%
ATP Masters 1000
Indian Wells Masters	Q1	A	1R	1R	1R	3R	0 / 4	2–4	33%
Miami Open	A	A	2R	1R	1R	1R	0 / 4	1–4	20%
Monte Carlo Masters	A	A	A	A	A	A	0 / 0	0–0	–
Madrid Open	A	A	A	1R	1R	Q1	0 / 2	0–2	0%
Italian Open	A	A	Q1	Q1	1R	2R	0 / 2	0–2	0%
Canadian Open	A	A	Q1	Q1	1R	1R	0 / 2	0–2	0%
Cincinnati Open	A	A	A	1R	1R	2R	0 / 3	1–3	25%
Shanghai Masters	NH		1R	1R	1R	1R	0 / 4	0–4	0%
Paris Masters	A	A	A	A	1R	Q1	0 / 1	0–1	0%
Win–loss	0–0	0–0	1–3	0–5	0–8	3–6	0 / 22	4–22	15%
Career statistics
Tournaments	0	1	9	22	23	11	66		
Titles	0	0	0	0	0	0	0		
Finals	0	0	0	0	2	0	2		
Overall win–loss	0–0	3–1	3–9	10–22	13–23	8–11	0 / 66	37–66	51%
Year-end ranking	356	158	110	111	62				

== ATP Tour finals ==
=== Singles: 2 (2 runner-ups) ===
Legend Grand Slam (–) ATP 1000 (–) ATP 500 (–) ATP 250 (0–2)	Finals by surface Hard (0–2) Clay (–) Grass (–)	Finals by setting Outdoor (0–1) Indoor (0–1)

Result	W–L	Date	Tournament	Tier	Surface	Opponent	Score
Loss	0–1	Jan 2025	Open Occitanie, France	ATP 250	Hard (i)	(Canada) Félix Auger-Aliassime	2–6, 7–6^{(9–7)}, 6–7^{(2–7)}
Loss	0–2	Jul 2025	Los Cabos Open, Mexico	ATP 250	Hard	(Canada) Denis Shapovalov	4–6, 2–6

== ATP Challenger and ITF World Tennis Tour finals ==
=== Singles: 8 (6 titles, 2 runner-ups) ===
Legend ATP Challenger Tour (6–1) ITF WTT (0–1)	Finals by Surface Hard (6–1) Clay (0–1)

Result	W–L	Date	Tournament	Tier	Surface	Opponent	Score
Loss	0–1	Jul 2022	Indy Challenger, US	Challenger	Hard (i)	(China) Wu Yibing	7–6^{(12–10)}, 6–7^{(13–15)}, 3–6
Win	1–1	Jan 2023	Cleveland Open, US	Challenger	Hard (i)	(China) Wu Yibing	3–6, 7–5, 7–6^{(7–2)}
Win	2–1	Feb 2023	Texas Tennis Classic, US	Challenger	Hard	(France) Alexandre Müller	6–3, 4–6, 6–2
Win	3–1	Oct 2023	Shenzhen Longhua Open, China	Challenger	Hard	(Portugal) Nuno Borges	7–6^{(7–4)}, 7–6^{(7–5)}
Win	4–1	Nov 2023	Challenger Temuco, Chile	Challenger	Hard	(Brazil) Gilbert Klier Jr.	4–6, 6–3, 6–3
Win	5–1	Jan 2025	Oeiras Indoors, Portugal	Challenger	Hard (i)	(Hungary) Zsombor Piros	6–4, 7–6^{(7–4)}
Win	6–1	Mar 2025	Copa Cap Cana, Dominican Republic	Challenger	Hard	(Bosnia and Herzegovina) Damir Džumhur	6–2, 6–3

Result	W–L	Date	Tournament	Tier	Surface	Opponent	Score
Loss	0–1	Oct 2019	M25 Fayetteville, US	WTT	Clay	(Dominican Republic) Roberto Cid Subervi	2–6, 2–6

=== Doubles: 3 (3 runner-ups) ===
Legend ATP Challenger Tour (0–2) ITF WTT (0–1)	Finals by surface Hard (0–3) Clay (–)

Result	W–L	Date	Tournament	Tier	Surface	Partner	Opponents	Score
Loss	0–1	Oct 2022	Seoul Open Challenger, South Korea	Challenger	Hard	(South Korea) Chung Yun-seong	(Japan) Kaichi Uchida (Chinese Taipei) Wu Tung-lin	7–6^{(7–2)}, 5–7, [9–11]
Loss	0–2	Nov 2023	Challenger Temuco, Chile	Challenger	Hard	(United States) Keegan Smith	(Brazil) Mateus Alves (Chile) Matías Soto	2–6, 5–7

Result	W–L	Date	Tournament	Tier	Surface	Partner	Opponents	Score
Loss	0–1	Nov 2020	M15 Fayetteville, US	WTT	Hard	(Canada) Liam Draxl	(United Kingdom) Charles Broom (Chile) Matías Soto	6–2, 2–6, [5–10]

== Wins over top 10 players ==
- Kovacevic has a 3–6 record against players who were, at the time the match was played, ranked in the top 10.

Season	2025	2026	Total
Wins	2	1	3

#	Player	Rk	Event	Surface	Rd	Score	Rk
2025
1.	Andrey Rublev	10	Open Occitanie, France	Hard (i)	SF	7–5, 6–4	102
2.	Andrey Rublev	10	Los Cabos Open, Mexico	Hard	SF	3–6, 6–4, 6–4	76
2026
3.	(Canada) Félix Auger-Aliassime	5	Hamburg Open, Germany	Clay	2R	4–6, 7–5, 6–4	94

*As of 19 July 2025
