= Diego Fernández Flores =

Chilean tennis player

- Country (sports): Chile
- Born: 7 October 2000 (age 25) Santiago, Chile
- Height: 1.85 m (6 ft 1 in)
- Plays: Right-handed (one-handed backhand)
- Prize money: US $62,411

Singles
- Career record: 1–0 (at ATP Tour level, Grand Slam level, and in Davis Cup)
- Career titles: 0
- Highest ranking: No. 652 (14 October 2024)
- Current ranking: No. 1,092 (15 June 2026)

Doubles
- Career record: 0–0 (at ATP Tour level, Grand Slam level, and in Davis Cup)
- Career titles: 0
- Highest ranking: No. 589 (21 August 2023)
- Current ranking: No. 809 (15 June 2026)
- Last updated on: 18 June 2026.

Diego Fernández Flores (born 7 October 2000) is a Chilean tennis player. Fernández Flores has a career high ATP singles ranking of No. 652 achieved on 14 October 2024 and a career high ATP doubles ranking of No. 589 achieved on 21 August 2023.

Fernández Flores represents Chile at the Davis Cup, making his first appearance in a tie against Slovenia.

== ITF World Tennis Tour finals ==
=== Singles: 4 (4 runner-ups) ===
Legend ITF WTT (0–4)	Finals by surface Hard (0–3) Clay (0–1) Grass (0–0) Carpet (0–0)

Result	W–L	Date	Tournament	Tier	Surface	Opponent	Score
Loss	0–1	May 2021	M15 Marbella, Spain	WTT	Hard	(Belgium) Yannick Mertens	2–6, 1–6
Loss	0–2	Jun 2022	M15 Quito, Ecuador	WTT	Clay	(Chile) Matías Soto	3–6, 6–7^{(3–7)}
Loss	0–3	Feb 2024	M15 Villena, Spain	WTT	Hard	(Spain) Alejo Sánchez Quílez	4–6, 6–4, 2–6
Loss	0–4	Apr 2024	M15 Sanxenxo, Spain	WTT	Hard	(Argentina) Julio Cesar Porras	2–6, 1–6

=== Doubles: 4 (4 runner-ups) ===
Legend ITF WTT (0–4)	Finals by surface Hard (0–3) Clay (0–1) Grass (0–0) Carpet (0–0)

Result	W–L	Date	Tournament	Tier	Surface	Partner	Opponents	Score
Loss	0–1	Nov 2021	M15 Monastir, Tunisia	WTT	Hard	(Colombia) Adrià Soriano Barrera	(France) Martin Breysach (France) Cesar Bourgouis	4–6, 4–6
Loss	0–2	Jun 2022	M15 Quito, Ecuador	WTT	Clay	(Chile) Matías Soto	(Colombia) Juan Sebastián Osorio (Colombia) Juan Sebastián Gómez	6–7^{(5–7)}, 6–7^{(2–7)}
Loss	0–3	Sep 2022	M25 Sintra, Portugal	WTT	Hard	(Colombia) Adrià Soriano Barrera	(United Kingdom) Harry Wendelken (Denmark) Benjamin Hannestad	6–4, 1–6, [7–10]
Loss	0–4	Mar 2023	M25 Quinta do Lago, Portugal	WTT	Hard	(Colombia) Adrià Soriano Barrera	(Netherlands) Mats Hermans (Netherlands) Mick Veldheer	4–6, 3–6

== Davis Cup ==
=== Participations (1–0) ===
Group membership World Group (0–0) Qualifying Round (0–0) WG Play-off (0–0) Group I (1–0) Group II (0–0) Group III (0–0) Group IV (0–0)	Matches by surface Hard (0–0) Clay (1–0) Grass (0–0) Carpet (0–0)	Matches by type Singles (1–0) Doubles (0–0)

- ▲ ▼ indicates the outcome of the Davis Cup match followed by the score, date, place of event, the zonal classification and its phase, and the court surface.

Rubber outcome	No.	Rubber	Match type (partner if any)	Opponent nation	Opponent player(s)	Score
▲4–0; 4-5 March 2022; Club de Tenis Unión, Viña del Mar, Chile; Davis Cup World Group I Play-offs; Clay (outdoor) surface
Victory	1	IV	Singles	Slovenia	Sebastian Dominko	3–6, 7–6^{7–4}, [10–2]
