= Challenger Temuco =

Tennis tournament in Chile

- 2025 Challenger Temuco

ATP Challenger Tour
- Event name: Challenger Temuco
- Location: Temuco, Chile
- Category: ATP Challenger 100 (2024-)
- Surface: Hard
- Prize money: $133,250 (2024)

Current champions (2024)
- Singles: (Lebanon) Hady Habib
- Doubles: (United States) Christian Harrison (United States) Evan King

The Challenger Dove Men+Care Temuco is a professional tennis tournament played on hard courts. It is part of the Association of Tennis Professionals (ATP) Challenger Tour. It is held in Temuco, Chile, since 2022.

== Past finals ==
=== Singles ===
Year	Champion	Runner-up	Score
2025	(Argentina) Federico Agustín Gómez	(Argentina) Lautaro Midón	6–4, 6–1
2024	(Lebanon) Hady Habib	(Argentina) Camilo Ugo Carabelli	6–4, 6–7^{(3–7)}, 7–6^{(7–2)}
2023	(United States) Aleksandar Kovacevic	(Brazil) Gilbert Klier Júnior	4–6, 6–3, 6–3
2022	(Argentina) Guido Andreozzi	(Argentina) Nicolás Kicker	4–6, 6–4, 6–2

=== Doubles ===
Year	Champions	Runners-up	Score
2025	(United States) Alafia Ayeni (United States) Daniel Milavsky	(Canada) Juan Carlos Aguilar (Bolivia) Federico Zeballos	6–7^{(6–8)}, 6–4, [10–6]
2024	(United States) Christian Harrison (United States) Evan King	(Zimbabwe) Benjamin Lock (Argentina) Renzo Olivo	7–6^{(7–5)}, 7–5
2023	(Brazil) Mateus Alves (Chile) Matías Soto	(United States) Aleksandar Kovacevic (United States) Keegan Smith	6–2, 7–5
2022	(Argentina) Guido Andreozzi (Argentina) Guillermo Durán	(Venezuela) Luis David Martínez (India) Jeevan Nedunchezhiyan	6–4, 6–2
