= Alafia Ayeni =

American tennis player

- Country (sports): United States
- Born: August 10, 1999 (age 27) Walnut Creek, California
- Height: 6 ft 3 in (1.91 m)
- Plays: Right-handed
- College: Cornell, University of Kentucky
- Prize money: US $162,128

Singles
- Career record: 0–0 (at ATP Tour level, Grand Slam level, and in Davis Cup)
- Career titles: 0
- Highest ranking: No. 395 (June 12, 2023)
- Current ranking: No. 428 (November 9, 2026)

Doubles
- Career record: 0–0 (at ATP Tour level, Grand Slam level, and in Davis Cup)
- Career titles: 0
- Highest ranking: No. 161 (November 16, 2026)
- Current ranking: No. 161 (November 16, 2026)
- Last updated on: November 16, 2026.

Alafia Ayeni (born August 10, 1999) is an American tennis player. He has a career-high singles ranking of world No. 395 achieved on June 12, 2023 and a doubles ranking of No. 161 achieved on November 16, 2026.

== Early life ==
Raised in San Diego, California, he is the son of Anthony Ayeni and Pamela Hinkson Ayeni, and he has one brother and one sister. He attended Westview High School, prior to attending Cornell University. He then transferred to the University of Kentucky, where he won all-American honours in June 2023.

== Career ==
=== 2017: Juniors ===
In April 2017, Ayeni won the Easter Bowl USTA Junior Spring Nationals played at the Indian Wells Tennis Garden. He defeated Sebastian Korda, 6-4, 0-6, 7-5, to win the final.

=== 2018-2025: First pro titles ===
In November 2025, playing alongside compatriot Daniel Milavsky, Ayeni won his first title on the ATP Challenger Tour, winning the men's doubles at the 2025 Challenger Temuco in Chile, where they defeated Juan Carlos Aguilar and Federico Zeballos on a match tie-break. He also defeated the top seed Juan Manuel Cerúndolo to reach the semifinals in singles at the tournament.

== Personal life ==
The son of a Pamela and Anthony, his mother is a software engineer. He is of Nigerian descent; his father is from Nigeria and moved to the United States at the age of 17 and works as a lawyer. Ayeni taught himself to play piano. In 2022, Ayeni launched his own brand Team 3x, designed to help empower minorities overcome structural barriers and social stigmas in sport. Profits from his clothing line is used to assist junior tennis players in southern California.
