= 2024 JC Ferrero Challenger Open =

- Date: 30 September – 6 October
- Edition: 7th
- Surface: Hard
- Location: Villena, Alicante, Spain
- Venue: Ferrero Tennis Academy

Champions

Singles
- (Poland) Kamil Majchrzak

Doubles
- (India) Anirudh Chandrasekar / (India) Niki Kaliyanda Poonacha
- Villena Open

The 2024 Villena Open Alicante Ferrero Challenger was a professional tennis tournament played on hardcourts. It was the seventh edition of the tournament which was part of the 2024 ATP Challenger Tour. It took place at the Ferrero Tennis Academy in Villena, Alicante, Spain, between 30 September and 6 October 2024.

== Singles main-draw entrants ==
=== Seeds ===
Country	Player	Rank^{1}	Seed
CRO	Duje Ajduković	108	1
FRA	Luca Van Assche	111	2
SVK	Lukáš Klein	122	3
FRA	Constant Lestienne	138	4
USA	Nicolas Moreno de Alboran	145	5
POL	Kamil Majchrzak	147	6
FRA	Hugo Grenier	150	7
SUI	Jérôme Kym	152	8

- ^{1} Rankings are as of 23 September 2024.

=== Other entrants ===
The following players received wildcards into the singles main draw:

- (United States) Dali Blanch
- (United States) Darwin Blanch
- (Spain) Rafael Jódar

The following player received entry into the singles main draw as an alternate:

- (Italy) ~~Giovanni Fonio~~

The following players received entry from the qualifying draw:

- (Germany) Justin Engel
- (Belgium) Michael Geerts
- (Spain) David Jordà Sanchis
- (Spain) Daniel Mérida
- (Switzerland) Jakub Paul
- (Czech Republic) Jiří Veselý

The following players received entry as lucky losers:

- (France) Laurent Lokoli
- (Germany) Christoph Negritu

== Champions ==
=== Singles ===
- (Poland) Kamil Majchrzak def. (United States) Nicolas Moreno de Alboran 6–4, 6–2.

=== Doubles ===
- (India) Anirudh Chandrasekar / (India) Niki Kaliyanda Poonacha def. (Monaco) Romain Arneodo / (Spain) Íñigo Cervantes 7–6^{(7–2)}, 6–4.
