= 2021 JC Ferrero Challenger Open =

- Date: 11–17 October
- Edition: 4th
- Surface: Clay
- Location: Villena, Alicante, Spain
- Venue: Ferrero Tennis Academy

Champions

Singles
- (France) Constant Lestienne

Doubles
- (Ukraine) Denys Molchanov / (Spain) David Vega Hernández
- JC Ferrero Challenger Open

The 2021 JC Ferrero Challenger Open was a professional tennis tournament played on clay courts. It was the fourth edition of the tournament which was part of the 2021 ATP Challenger Tour. It took place at the Ferrero Tennis Academy in Villena, Alicante, Spain, between 11 and 17 October 2021.

== Singles main-draw entrants ==
=== Seeds ===
Country	Player	Rank^{1}	Seed
ESP	Feliciano López	108	1
ESP	Fernando Verdasco	137	2
GER	Oscar Otte	138	3
FRA	Quentin Halys	158	4
KAZ	Dmitry Popko	165	5
POL	Kacper Żuk	172	6
ESP	Mario Vilella Martínez	173	7
POR	João Sousa	182	8

- ^{1} Rankings are as of 4 October 2021.

=== Other entrants ===
The following players received wildcards into the singles main draw:

- (Spain) Nicolás Álvarez Varona
- (Spain) Feliciano López
- (United States) Emilio Nava

The following players received entry into the singles main draw as alternates:

- (Austria) Lucas Miedler
- (United States) ~~Nicolas Moreno de Alboran~~
- (Ukraine) Vladyslav Orlov
- (Germany) Mischa Zverev

The following players received entry from the qualifying draw:

- (India) Sriram Balaji
- (Ukraine) Georgii Kravchenko
- (Argentina) Santiago Rodríguez Taverna
- (Kazakhstan) Denis Yevseyev

== Champions ==
=== Singles ===
- (France) Constant Lestienne def. (France) Hugo Grenier 6–4, 6–3.

=== Doubles ===
- (Ukraine) Denys Molchanov / (Spain) David Vega Hernández def. (Monaco) Romain Arneodo / (Australia) Matt Reid 6–4, 6–2.
