= 2025 Villena Open =

- Date: 29 September – 5 October
- Edition: 8th
- Surface: Hard
- Location: Villena, Alicante, Spain
- Venue: Ferrero Tennis Academy

Champions

Singles
- (Spain) Pablo Carreño Busta

Doubles
- (Belgium) Sander Gillé / (Netherlands) Sem Verbeek
- Villena Open

The 2025 Ferrero Challenger was a professional tennis tournament played on hardcourts. It was the eighth edition of the tournament which was part of the 2025 ATP Challenger Tour. It took place at the Ferrero Tennis Academy in Villena, Alicante, Spain, between 29 September and 5 October 2025.

== Singles main-draw entrants ==
=== Seeds ===
Country	Player	Rank^{1}	Seed
GER	Jan-Lennard Struff	102	1
CHI	Nicolás Jarry	111	2
ESP	Pablo Carreño Busta	123	3
SVK	Lukáš Klein	127	4
ESP	Martín Landaluce	136	5
TUN	Moez Echargui	142	6
~~SUI~~	~~Jérôme Kym~~	~~152~~	~~7~~
ESP	Daniel Mérida	173	8

- ^{1} Rankings are as of 22 September 2025.

=== Other entrants ===
The following players received wildcards into the singles main draw:

- (United States) Dali Blanch
- (United States) Darwin Blanch
- (Spain) Iñaki Montes de la Torre

The following player received entry into the singles main draw as an alternate:

- (Spain) Albert Ramos Viñolas

The following players received entry from the qualifying draw:

- (Spain) Alberto Barroso Campos
- (Italy) Raúl Brancaccio
- (Czech Republic) Petr Brunclík
- (Italy) Lorenzo Carboni
- (Poland) Maks Kaśnikowski
- (Austria) Neil Oberleitner

The following players received entry as lucky losers:

- (United Kingdom) Giles Hussey
- (Italy) Luca Potenza

== Champions ==
=== Singles ===
- (Spain) Pablo Carreño Busta def. (France) Hugo Grenier 4–6, 6–1, 6–4.

=== Doubles ===
- (Belgium) Sander Gillé / (Netherlands) Sem Verbeek def. (Czech Republic) Petr Nouza / (Czech Republic) Patrik Rikl 6–3, 6–4.
