= 2024 JC Ferrero Challenger Open – Singles =

Singles
- 2024 JC Ferrero Challenger Open

Final
- Champion: (Poland) Kamil Majchrzak
- Runner-up: (United States) Nicolas Moreno de Alboran
- Score: 6–4, 6–2

Events
Singles	Doubles
- Villena Open

Constant Lestienne was the defending champion but lost in the quarterfinals to Nicolas Moreno de Alboran.

Kamil Majchrzak won the title after defeating Moreno de Alboran 6–4, 6–2 in the final.

== Seeds ==
1. (Croatia) Duje Ajduković (quarterfinals)
2. (France) Luca Van Assche (second round)
3. (Slovakia) Lukáš Klein (second round)
4. (France) Constant Lestienne (quarterfinals)
5. (United States) Nicolas Moreno de Alboran (final)
6. (Poland) Kamil Majchrzak (champion)
7. (France) Hugo Grenier (quarterfinals)
8. (Switzerland) Jérôme Kym (semifinals)

== Draw ==
Key

- Q = Qualifier
- WC = Wild card
- LL = Lucky loser
- Alt = Alternate
- ITF = ITF entry
- PR = Protected ranking
- SR = Special ranking
- SE = Special exempt
- JE = Junior exempt
- JR = Junior Accelerator Programme entrant
- CO = College Accelerator Programme entrant
- NG = Next Gen Accelerator Program entrant
- w/o = Walkover
- r = Retired
- d = Defaulted

=== Finals ===
Semifinals
6	(Poland) Kamil Majchrzak	6	6
(Spain) Martín Landaluce	3	4
5	(United States) Nicolas Moreno de Alboran	3	6	6
8	(Switzerland) Jérôme Kym	6	1	2

Final
6	(Poland) Kamil Majchrzak	6	6
5	(United States) Nicolas Moreno de Alboran	4	2

=== Top half ===
First round
1	(Croatia) D Ajduković	4	6	6
(Switzerland) M-A Hüsler	6	4	2
(France) R Bertrand	6	6
LL	(France) L Lokoli	2	4
WC	(United States) Dali Blanch	1	3
Q	(Czech Republic) J Veselý	6	6
(Croatia) M Poljičak	4	6^{4}
6	(Poland) K Majchrzak	6	7^{7}
3	(Slovakia) L Klein	7^{9}	2
(Netherlands) G Brouwer	6^{7}	1^{r}
Q	(Spain) D Jordà Sanchis	6	3	6^{4}
(Spain) M Landaluce	4	6	7^{7}
(Italy) E Dalla Valle	6	6
Q	(Belgium) M Geerts	3	3
WC	(United States) Dar Blanch	4	4
7	(France) H Grenier	6	6

Second round
1	(Croatia) D Ajduković	7^{7}	6
(France) R Bertrand	6^{2}	2
Q	(Czech Republic) J Veselý	6^{2}	7^{7}	5
6	(Poland) K Majchrzak	7^{7}	6^{5}	7
3	(Slovakia) L Klein	6	2	6^{3}
(Spain) M Landaluce	3	6	7^{7}
(Italy) E Dalla Valle	4	6^{4}
7	(France) H Grenier	6	7^{7}

Quarterfinals
1	(Croatia) D Ajduković	6	3	2
6	(Poland) K Majchrzak	4	6	6
(Spain) M Landaluce	7^{9}	6
7	(France) H Grenier	6^{7}	3

Semifinals
6	(Poland) K Majchrzak	6	6
(Spain) M Landaluce	3	4

=== Bottom half ===
First round
5	(United States) N Moreno de Alboran	6	6
(Romania) C Crețu	2	2
(France) Jules Marie	1	7^{7}	6
(France) B Paire	6	6^{2}	4
(Germany) R Molleker	1	6	4
LL	(Germany) C Negritu	6	3	6
Q	(Switzerland) J Paul	6	2	1
4	(France) C Lestienne	3	6	6
8	(Switzerland) J Kym	6	6
(Italy) M Gigante	3	1
(France) V Royer	6	6
(Bosnia and Herzegovina) N Fatić	3	4
WC	(Spain) R Jódar	3	3
Q	(Germany) J Engel	6	6
Q	(Spain) D Mérida	3	3
2	(France) L Van Assche	6	6

Second round
5	(United States) N Moreno de Alboran	6^{0}	6	6
(France) J Marie	7^{7}	2	0
LL	(Germany) C Negritu	6	5	5
4	(France) C Lestienne	3	7	7
8	(Switzerland) J Kym	6	6
(France) V Royer	1	1
Q	(Germany) J Engel	3	6	6
2	(France) L Van Assche	6	4	0

Quarterfinals
5	(United States) N Moreno de Alboran	6	6
4	(France) C Lestienne	4	4
8	(Switzerland) J Kym	6	7^{7}
Q	(Germany) J Engel	2	6^{5}

Semifinals
5	(United States) N Moreno de Alboran	3	6	6
8	(Switzerland) J Kym	6	1	2
