= 2022 JC Ferrero Challenger Open =

- Date: 3–9 October
- Edition: 5th
- Surface: Clay
- Location: Villena, Alicante, Spain
- Venue: Ferrero Tennis Academy

Champions

Singles
- (Slovakia) Lukáš Klein

Doubles
- (Netherlands) Robin Haase / (France) Albano Olivetti
- JC Ferrero Challenger Open

The 2022 JC Ferrero Challenger Open was a professional tennis tournament played on clay courts. It was the fifth edition of the tournament which was part of the 2022 ATP Challenger Tour. It took place at the Ferrero Tennis Academy in Villena, Alicante, Spain, between 3 and 9 October 2022.

== Singles main-draw entrants ==
=== Seeds ===
Country	Player	Rank^{1}	Seed
ESP	Fernando Verdasco	116	1
FRA	Geoffrey Blancaneaux	139	2
ITA	Matteo Arnaldi	157	3
BUL	Dimitar Kuzmanov	159	4
ITA	Raúl Brancaccio	170	5
USA	Emilio Nava	176	6
HUN	Fábián Marozsán	185	7
SVK	Lukáš Klein	219	8

- ^{1} Rankings are as of 26 September 2022.

=== Other entrants ===
The following players received wildcards into the singles main draw:

- (United States) Dali Blanch
- (United States) Ulises Blanch
- (Spain) Martín Landaluce

The following players received entry into the singles main draw as alternates:

- (Netherlands) Robin Haase
- (United Kingdom) Billy Harris

The following players received entry from the qualifying draw:

- (China) Bu Yunchaokete
- (Canada) Steven Diez
- (Italy) Federico Gaio
- (Lebanon) Hady Habib
- (Germany) Rudolf Molleker
- (United Kingdom) Stuart Parker

== Champions ==
=== Singles ===
- (Slovakia) Lukáš Klein def. (Dominican Republic) Nick Hardt 6–3, 6–4.

=== Doubles ===
- (Netherlands) Robin Haase / (France) Albano Olivetti def. (Uzbekistan) Sanjar Fayziev / (Uzbekistan) Sergey Fomin 7–6^{(7–5)}, 7–5.
