= 2023 JC Ferrero Challenger Open =

- Date: 2–8 October
- Edition: 6th
- Surface: Hard
- Location: Villena, Alicante, Spain
- Venue: Ferrero Tennis Academy

Champions

Singles
- (France) Constant Lestienne

Doubles
- (India) Niki Kaliyanda Poonacha / (India) Divij Sharan
- JC Ferrero Challenger Open

The 2023 Alicante Ferrero Challenger was a professional tennis tournament played on hardcourts. It was the sixth edition of the tournament which was part of the 2023 ATP Challenger Tour. It took place at the Ferrero Tennis Academy in Villena, Alicante, Spain, between 2 and 8 October 2023.

== Singles main-draw entrants ==
=== Seeds ===
Country	Player	Rank^{1}	Seed
FRA	Constant Lestienne	94	1
SVK	Alex Molčan	113	2
ESP	Pedro Martínez	116	3
FRA	Benoît Paire	121	4
FRA	Arthur Cazaux	125	5
GER	Maximilian Marterer	126	6
ARG	Thiago Agustín Tirante	143	7
ITA	Mattia Bellucci	144	8

- ^{1} Rankings are as of 25 September 2023.

=== Other entrants ===
The following players received wildcards into the singles main draw:

- (Spain) Diego Augusto Barreto Sánchez
- (United States) Darwin Blanch
- (Spain) Martín Landaluce

The following players received entry from the qualifying draw:

- (Spain) Alberto Barroso Campos
- (Israel) Daniel Cukierman
- (United States) Martin Damm
- (Tunisia) Moez Echargui
- (United Kingdom) Billy Harris
- (Australia) Akira Santillan

The following player received entry as a lucky loser:

- (United Kingdom) Daniel Cox

== Champions ==
=== Singles ===
- (France) Constant Lestienne def. (France) Hugo Grenier 6–7^{(10–12)}, 6–2, 6–4.

=== Doubles ===
- (India) Niki Kaliyanda Poonacha / (India) Divij Sharan def. (India) Jeevan Nedunchezhiyan / (Australia) John-Patrick Smith 6–4, 3–6, [10–7].
