= 2018 JC Ferrero Challenger Open =

- Date: 2–7 April
- Edition: 1st
- Surface: Clay
- Location: Villena, Alicante, Spain
- Venue: Ferrero Tennis Academy

Champions

Singles
- (Spain) Pablo Andújar

Doubles
- (Netherlands) Wesley Koolhof / (New Zealand) Artem Sitak
- JC Ferrero Challenger Open

The 2018 JC Ferrero Challenger Open was a professional tennis tournament played on clay courts. It was the first edition of the tournament which was part of the 2018 ATP Challenger Tour. It took place at the Ferrero Tennis Academy in Villena, Alicante, Spain, between 2 and 7 April 2018.

== Singles main-draw entrants ==
=== Seeds ===
Country	Player	Rank^{1}	Seed
ESP	Roberto Carballés Baena	78	1
ITA	Marco Cecchinato	97	2
ITA	Stefano Travaglia	123	3
AUS	Alex de Minaur	130	4
ESP	Marcel Granollers	131	5
RUS	Alexey Vatutin	157	6
ITA	Alessandro Giannessi	161	7
FRA	Kenny de Schepper	173	8

- ^{1} Rankings are as of 19 March 2018.

=== Other entrants ===
The following players received wildcards into the singles main draw:

- (Spain) Pablo Andújar
- (Spain) Carlos Boluda-Purkiss
- (Spain) Alejandro Davidovich Fokina
- (Spain) Bernabé Zapata Miralles

The following players received entry from the qualifying draw:

- (Russia) Ivan Gakhov
- (Spain) Daniel Gimeno Traver
- (Italy) Gian Marco Moroni
- (Spain) Mario Vilella Martínez

The following player received entry as a lucky loser:

- (Italy) Federico Gaio

== Champions ==
=== Singles ===
- (Spain) Pablo Andújar def. (Australia) Alex de Minaur 7–6^{(7–5)}, 6–1.

=== Doubles ===
- (Netherlands) Wesley Koolhof / (New Zealand) Artem Sitak def. (Argentina) Guido Andreozzi / (Uruguay) Ariel Behar 6–3, 6–2.
