= 2023 Challenger Club Els Gorchs – Singles =

Singles
- 2023 Challenger Club Els Gorchs

Final
- Champion: (France) Hugo Grenier
- Runner-up: (United Kingdom) Billy Harris
- Score: 3–6, 6–1, 7–6^{(7–3)}

Events
Singles	Doubles
Challenger Club Els Gorchs	· 2024 →

This was the first edition of the tournament.

Hugo Grenier won the title after defeating Billy Harris 3–6, 6–1, 7–6^{(7–3)} in the final.

== Seeds ==
1. (Australia) Max Purcell (semifinals)
2. (France) Hugo Grenier (champion)
3. (Ukraine) Oleksii Krutykh (first round)
4. (Czech Republic) Dalibor Svrčina (first round)
5. (Bulgaria) Adrian Andreev (second round)
6. (Italy) Lorenzo Giustino (second round)
7. (Argentina) Marco Trungelliti (quarterfinals)
8. (Romania) Nicholas David Ionel (second round)

== Draw ==
=== Key ===
- Q = Qualifier
- WC = Wild card
- LL = Lucky loser
- Alt = Alternate
- SE = Special exempt
- PR = Protected ranking
- ITF = ITF entry
- JE = Junior exempt
- w/o = Walkover
- r = Retired
- d = Defaulted
- SR = Special ranking

=== Finals ===
Semifinals
1	(Australia) Max Purcell	6^{3}	6^{4}
Q	(United Kingdom) Billy Harris	7^{7}	7^{7}
(China) Bu Yunchaokete	7^{9}	3	6^{3}
2	(France) Hugo Grenier	6^{7}	6	7^{7}

Final
Q	(United Kingdom) Billy Harris	6	1	6^{3}
2	(France) Hugo Grenier	3	6	7^{7}

=== Top half ===
First round
1	(Australia) M Purcell	3	6	7^{7}
(Italy) A Arnaboldi	6	1	6^{3}
(United States) U Blanch	4	6^{1}
(Belgium) M Geerts	6	7^{7}
WC	(Spain) D Jordà Sanchis	7^{10}	6
(Israel) E Leshem	6^{8}	1
Q	(Japan) Rimpei Kawakami	6	3	3
8	(Romania) ND Ionel	2	6	6
3	(Ukraine) O Krutykh	1	2
Q	(United Kingdom) B Harris	6	6
(Spain) O Roca Batalla	7^{7}	2	6
(Czech Republic) L Rosol	6^{5}	6	2
Q	(Sweden) K Friberg	6	5	6
Q	Bogdan Bobrov	4	7	1
(Portugal) J Domingues	5	6	3
7	(Argentina) M Trungelliti	7	3	6

Second round
1	(Australia) M Purcell	7	6
(Belgium) M Geerts	5	1
WC	(Spain) D Jordà Sanchis	4	6	6
8	(Romania) ND Ionel	6	3	3
Q	(United Kingdom) B Harris	6	6
(Spain) O Roca Batalla	2	0
Q	(Sweden) K Friberg	3	1
7	(Argentina) M Trungelliti	6	6

Quarterfinals
1	(Australia) M Purcell	6	7^{7}
WC	(Spain) D Jordà Sanchis	1	6^{3}
Q	(United Kingdom) B Harris	6	6
7	(Argentina) M Trungelliti	0	3

Semifinals
1	(Australia) M Purcell	6^{3}	6^{4}
Q	(United Kingdom) B Harris	7^{7}	7^{7}

=== Bottom half ===
First round
5	(Bulgaria) A Andreev	4	6	6
WC	(Spain) D Mérida	6	1	3
(Canada) S Diez	6	2	4
(Portugal) G Elias	3	6	6
(China) Y Bu	6	6
WC	(Spain) John Echeverría	1	2
(Tunisia) S Mansouri	6	6
4	(Czech Republic) D Svrčina	1	4
6	(Italy) L Giustino	6	5	7^{7}
(Germany) R Molleker	3	7	6^{4}
(United Kingdom) J Clarke	3	2
I Gakhov	6	6
Q	(Ukraine) Aleksandr Braynin	6^{4}	5
Q	(United Kingdom) D Cox	7^{7}	7
(Spain) N Sánchez Izquierdo	4	4
2	(France) H Grenier	6	6

Second round
5	(Bulgaria) A Andreev	4	3
(Portugal) G Elias	6	6
(China) Y Bu	6	6
(Tunisia) S Mansouri	2	2
6	(Italy) L Giustino	2	5
I Gakhov	6	7
Q	(United Kingdom) D Cox	3	4
2	(France) H Grenier	6	6

Quarterfinals
(Portugal) G Elias	3	6^{5}
(China) Y Bu	6	7^{7}
I Gakhov	6	3	3
2	(France) H Grenier	4	6	6

Semifinals
(China) Y Bu	7^{9}	3	6^{3}
2	(France) H Grenier	6^{7}	6	7^{7}
