= 2022 JC Ferrero Challenger Open – Singles =

Singles
- 2022 JC Ferrero Challenger Open

Final
- Champion: (Slovakia) Lukáš Klein
- Runner-up: (Dominican Republic) Nick Hardt
- Score: 6–3, 6–4

Events
Singles	Doubles
- JC Ferrero Challenger Open

Constant Lestienne was the defending champion but chose not to defend his title.

Lukáš Klein won the title after defeating Nick Hardt 6–3, 6–4 in the final.

== Seeds ==
1. (Spain) Fernando Verdasco (second round)
2. (France) Geoffrey Blancaneaux (first round, retired)
3. (Italy) Matteo Arnaldi (semifinals)
4. (Bulgaria) Dimitar Kuzmanov (quarterfinals)
5. (Italy) Raúl Brancaccio (second round)
6. (United States) Emilio Nava (quarterfinals)
7. (Hungary) Fábián Marozsán (semifinals)
8. (Slovakia) Lukáš Klein (champion)

== Draw ==
Key

- Q = Qualifier
- WC = Wild card
- LL = Lucky loser
- Alt = Alternate
- ITF = ITF entry
- PR = Protected ranking
- SR = Special ranking
- SE = Special exempt
- JE = Junior exempt
- JR = Junior Accelerator Programme entrant
- CO = College Accelerator Programme entrant
- NG = Next Gen Accelerator Program entrant
- w/o = Walkover
- r = Retired
- d = Defaulted

=== Finals ===
Semifinals
8	(Slovakia) Lukáš Klein	6	7^{7}
7	(Hungary) Fábián Marozsán	4	6^{2}
3	(Italy) Matteo Arnaldi	7	5	4
(Dominican Republic) Nick Hardt	5	7	6

Final
8	(Slovakia) Lukáš Klein	6	6
(Dominican Republic) Nick Hardt	3	4

=== Top half ===
First round
1	(Spain) F Verdasco	7	4	6
(Portugal) J Domingues	5	6	0
(Ukraine) O Krutykh	5	6	3
(Italy) S Caruso	7	1	6
WC	(Spain) M Landaluce	2	3
(Belgium) M Geerts	6	6
(Poland) K Żuk	3	4
8	(Slovakia) L Klein	6	6
4	(Bulgaria) D Kuzmanov	6	6
Q	(Canada) S Diez	3	2
Alt	(United Kingdom) B Harris	6	6
WC	(United States) Dali Blanch	3	4
Q	(United Kingdom) S Parker	6	4	1
(Italy) L Giustino	4	6	6
Q	(Lebanon) H Habib	2	1
7	(Hungary) F Marozsán	6	6

Second round
1	(Spain) F Verdasco	4	6^{4}
(Italy) S Caruso	6	7^{7}
(Belgium) M Geerts	6	6^{5}	4
8	(Slovakia) L Klein	4	7^{7}	6
4	(Bulgaria) D Kuzmanov	6	6
Alt	(United Kingdom) B Harris	4	4
(Italy) L Giustino	2	6	1
7	(Hungary) F Marozsán	6	3	6

Quarterfinals
(Italy) S Caruso	3	0
8	(Slovakia) L Klein	6	6
4	(Bulgaria) D Kuzmanov	6	5	5
7	(Hungary) F Marozsán	3	7	7

Semifinals
8	(Slovakia) L Klein	6	7^{7}
7	(Hungary) F Marozsán	4	6^{2}

=== Bottom half ===
First round
5	(Italy) R Brancaccio	7	7
Q	(China) Y Bu	5	5
(Portugal) F Ferreira Silva	4	6	6
(Lebanon) B Hassan	6	2	0
(Netherlands) J de Jong	6	6
Alt	(Netherlands) R Haase	3	1
WC	(United States) U Blanch	1	5
3	(Italy) M Arnaldi	6	7
6	(United States) Em Nava	6	6
(France) H Mayot	3	4
Q	(Germany) R Molleker	3	3
Q	(Italy) F Gaio	6	6
(Spain) N Álvarez Varona	6	7
(Brazil) G Décamps	2	5
(Dominican Republic) N Hardt	6	1
2	(France) G Blancaneaux	2	0^{r}

Second round
5	(Italy) R Brancaccio	2	3
(Portugal) F Ferreira Silva	6	6
(Netherlands) J de Jong	3	2
3	(Italy) M Arnaldi	6	6
6	(United States) Em Nava	6	6
Q	(Italy) F Gaio	3	2
(Spain) N Álvarez Varona	6^{6}	4
(Dominican Republic) N Hardt	7^{8}	6

Quarterfinals
(Portugal) F Ferreira Silva	5	6	4
3	(Italy) M Arnaldi	7	4	6
6	(United States) Em Nava	7^{7}	6^{3}	1
(Dominican Republic) N Hardt	6^{5}	7^{7}	6

Semifinals
3	(Italy) M Arnaldi	7	5	4
(Dominican Republic) N Hardt	5	7	6
