= 2023 Challenger Club Els Gorchs =

- Date: 20–26 March
- Edition: 1st
- Surface: Hard
- Location: Les Franqueses del Vallès, Spain

Champions

Singles
- (France) Hugo Grenier

Doubles
- (India) Anirudh Chandrasekar / (India) Vijay Sundar Prashanth
Challenger Club Els Gorchs	· 2024 →

The 2023 Challenger Club Els Gorchs was a professional tennis tournament played on hard courts. It was the first edition of the tournament which was part of the 2023 ATP Challenger Tour. It took place in Les Franqueses del Vallès, Spain between 20 and 26 March 2023.

== Singles main-draw entrants ==
=== Seeds ===
Country	Player	Rank^{1}	Seed
AUS	Max Purcell	95	1
FRA	Hugo Grenier	151	2
UKR	Oleksii Krutykh	162	3
CZE	Dalibor Svrčina	181	4
BUL	Adrian Andreev	204	5
ITA	Lorenzo Giustino	220	6
ARG	Marco Trungelliti	225	7
ROU	Nicholas David Ionel	229	8

- ^{1} Rankings are as of 6 March 2023.

=== Other entrants ===
The following players received wildcards into the singles main draw:

- (Spain) John Echeverría
- (Spain) David Jordà Sanchis
- (Spain) Daniel Mérida

The following players received entry from the qualifying draw:

- Bogdan Bobrov
- (Ukraine) Aleksandr Braynin
- (United Kingdom) Daniel Cox
- (Sweden) Karl Friberg
- (United Kingdom) Billy Harris
- (Japan) Rimpei Kawakami

== Champions ==
=== Singles ===
- (France) Hugo Grenier def. (United Kingdom) Billy Harris 3–6, 6–1, 7–6^{(7–3)}.

=== Doubles ===
- (India) Anirudh Chandrasekar / (India) Vijay Sundar Prashanth def. (India) Purav Raja / (India) Divij Sharan 7–5, 6–1.
