= 2026 Ferrero Challenger =

- Date: 5 – 11 October
- Edition: 9th
- Surface: Hard
- Location: Villena, Alicante, Spain
- Venue: Ferrero Tennis Academy

Champions

Singles
- (Serbia) Laslo Djere

Doubles
- (United States) Benjamin Kittay / (Japan) Takeru Yuzuki
- Ferrero Challenger

The 2026 Ferrero & Forty Challenger was a professional tennis tournament played on hardcourts. It was the ninth edition of the tournament which was part of the 2026 ATP Challenger Tour. It took place at the Ferrero Tennis Academy in Villena, Alicante, Spain, between 5 and 11 October 2026.

== Singles main-draw entrants ==
=== Seeds ===
Country	Player	Rank^{1}	Seed
~~CRO~~	~~Dino Prižmić~~	~~95~~	~~1~~
GBR	Toby Samuel	98	2
BIH	Damir Džumhur	102	3
ESP	Pedro Martínez	130	4
ESP	Pablo Llamas Ruiz	144	5
CRO	Borna Gojo	148	6
ITA	Francesco Maestrelli	168	7
BEL	Gauthier Onclin	169	8

- ^{1} Rankings are as of 28 September 2026.

=== Other entrants ===
The following players received wildcards into the singles main draw:

- (Spain) Maxi Carrascosa Díaz
- (Spain) Carles Hernández
- (Spain) Alejo Sánchez Quílez

The following players received entry into the singles main draw as alternates:

- (Italy) Luca Nardi
- (Spain) Daniel Rincón
- (Jordan) Abdullah Shelbayh

The following players received entry from the qualifying draw:

- (South Africa) Philip Henning
- (Ukraine) Georgii Kravchenko
- (Bulgaria) Petr Nesterov
- (Germany) Max Hans Rehberg
- (Switzerland) Dominic Stricker
- (United Kingdom) Oliver Tarvet

The following players received entry as lucky losers:

- (Czech Republic) Hynek Bartoň
- (Germany) Diego Dedura

== Champions ==
=== Singles ===
- (Serbia) Laslo Djere def. (Estonia) Daniil Glinka 6–4, 6–4.

=== Doubles ===
- (United States) Benjamin Kittay / (Japan) Takeru Yuzuki def. (Israel) Daniel Cukierman / (Brazil) Fernando Romboli 6–4, 5–7, [10–7].
