= 2023 Challenger Club Els Gorchs – Doubles =

Doubles
- 2023 Challenger Club Els Gorchs

Final
- Champions: (India) Anirudh Chandrasekar (India) Vijay Sundar Prashanth
- Runners-up: (India) Purav Raja (India) Divij Sharan
- Score: 7–5, 6–1

Events
Singles	Doubles
Challenger Club Els Gorchs	· 2024 →

This was the first edition of the tournament.

Anirudh Chandrasekar and Vijay Sundar Prashanth won the title after defeating Purav Raja and Divij Sharan 7–5, 6–1 in the final.

== Seeds ==
1. (Portugal) Francisco Cabral / (Australia) Max Purcell (quarterfinals)
2. (Italy) Marco Bortolotti / (Spain) Sergio Martos Gornés (semifinals)
3. (India) Anirudh Chandrasekar / (India) Vijay Sundar Prashanth (champions)
4. (India) Purav Raja / (India) Divij Sharan (final)

== Draw ==
=== Key ===
- Q = Qualifier
- WC = Wild card
- LL = Lucky loser
- Alt = Alternate
- ITF = ITF entry
- PR = Protected ranking
- SR = Special ranking
- SE = Special exempt
- JE = Junior exempt
- JR = Junior Accelerator Programme entrant
- CO = College Accelerator Programme entrant
- NG = Next Gen Accelerator Program entrant
- w/o = Walkover
- r = Retired
- d = Defaulted

First round
1	(Portugal) F Cabral (Australia) M Purcell	6	6
(Sweden) F Bergevi (Greece) Pe Tsitsipas	3	2
(Portugal) J Domingues (Portugal) G Elias	6	0	[5]
(United Kingdom) J Clarke (Italy) L Giustino	4	6	[10]
3	(India) A Chandrasekar (India) VS Prashanth	6	6
(Uzbekistan) S Fayziev (Ukraine) O Krutykh	2	4
(China) F Sun (Ukraine) V Uzhylovskyi	6	6
WC	(Spain) Aitor Capot Requena (Ukraine) Dmytro Kovkin	2	2
(Belgium) M Geerts (Tunisia) S Mansouri	6	4	[8]
WC	(Spain) D Jordà Sanchis (Spain) B Pujol Navarro	0	6	[10]
(Spain) A Barroso Campos (Argentina) M Trungelliti	3	7^{7}	[5]
4	(India) P Raja (India) D Sharan	6	6^{5}	[10]
(Spain) Í Cervantes (Spain) O Roca Batalla	6^{1}	2
I Gakhov (China) Y Bu	7^{7}	6
(United Kingdom) B Harris (Australia) A Santillan	4	3
2	(Italy) M Bortolotti (Spain) S Martos Gornés	6	6

Quarterfinals
1	(Portugal) F Cabral (Australia) M Purcell	6^{2}	6^{3}
(United Kingdom) J Clarke (Italy) L Giustino	7^{7}	7^{7}
3	(India) A Chandrasekar (India) VS Prashanth	6	6
(China) F Sun (Ukraine) V Uzhylovskyi	3	4
WC	(Spain) D Jordà Sanchis (Spain) B Pujol Navarro	4	3
4	(India) P Raja (India) D Sharan	6	6
I Gakhov (China) Y Bu	6^{6}	2
2	(Italy) M Bortolotti (Spain) S Martos Gornés	7^{8}	6

Semifinals
(United Kingdom) J Clarke (Italy) L Giustino	5	2
3	(India) A Chandrasekar (India) VS Prashanth	7	6
4	(India) P Raja (India) D Sharan	6	7^{7}
2	(Italy) M Bortolotti (Spain) S Martos Gornés	2	6^{4}

Final
3	(India) A Chandrasekar (India) VS Prashanth	7	6
4	(India) P Raja (India) D Sharan	5	1
