= 2026 Ferrero Challenger – Singles =

Singles
- 2026 Ferrero Challenger

Final
- Champion: (Serbia) Laslo Djere
- Runner-up: (Estonia) Daniil Glinka
- Score: 6–4, 6–4

Events
Singles	Doubles
- Ferrero Challenger

Pablo Carreño Busta was the defending champion but chose not to defend his title.

Laslo Djere won the title after defeating Daniil Glinka 6–4, 6–4 in the final.

== Seeds ==
1. (Croatia) Dino Prižmić (withdrew)
2. (United Kingdom) Toby Samuel (first round)
3. (Bosnia and Herzegovina) Damir Džumhur (second round)
4. (Spain) Pedro Martínez (semifinals)
5. (Spain) Pablo Llamas Ruiz (quarterfinals, retired)
6. (Croatia) Borna Gojo (quarterfinals)
7. (Italy) Francesco Maestrelli (first round)
8. (Belgium) Gauthier Onclin (first round)

== Draw ==
Key

- Q = Qualifier
- WC = Wild card
- LL = Lucky loser
- Alt = Alternate
- ITF = ITF entry
- PR = Protected ranking
- SR = Special ranking
- SE = Special exempt
- JE = Junior exempt
- JR = Junior Accelerator Programme entrant
- CO = College Accelerator Programme entrant
- NG = Next Gen Accelerator Program entrant
- w/o = Walkover
- r = Retired
- d = Defaulted

=== Finals ===
Semifinals
(United Kingdom) Jack Pinnington Jones	6	6^{6}	2
(Estonia) Daniil Glinka	3	7^{8}	6
4	(Spain) Pedro Martínez	4	2
(Serbia) Laslo Djere	6	6

Final
(Estonia) Daniil Glinka	4	4
(Serbia) Laslo Djere	6	6

=== Top half ===
First round
LL	(Germany) D Dedura	4	2
(United Kingdom) J Pinnington Jones	6	6
(France) F Balshaw	7^{7}	3	5
(Austria) J Schwärzler	6^{1}	6	7
Q	(South Africa) P Henning	7^{7}	6
(Poland) M Kaśnikowski	6^{3}	1
WC	(Spain) Maxi Carrascosa Díaz	2	2
6	(Croatia) B Gojo	6	6
3	(Bosnia and Herzegovina) D Džumhur	7	6
Q	(Ukraine) G Kravchenko	5	3
Alt	(Jordan) A Shelbayh	6	6
(Spain) D Jordà Sanchis	4	3
(Tunisia) M Echargui	7	6
(Italy) R Brancaccio	5	4
(Estonia) D Glinka	4	6	6
8	(Belgium) G Onclin	6	2	3

Second round
(United Kingdom) J Pinnington Jones	6	6
(Austria) J Schwärzler	1	3
Q	(South Africa) P Henning	6^{4}	6^{0}
6	(Croatia) B Gojo	7^{7}	7^{7}
3	(Bosnia and Herzegovina) D Džumhur	5	6	3
Alt	(Jordan) A Shelbayh	7	3	6
(Tunisia) M Echargui	2	1
(Estonia) D Glinka	6	6

Quarterfinals
(United Kingdom) J Pinnington Jones	6	7
6	(Croatia) B Gojo	2	5
Alt	(Jordan) A Shelbayh	6^{2}	6	3
(Estonia) D Glinka	7^{7}	4	6

Semifinals
(United Kingdom) J Pinnington Jones	6	6^{6}	2
(Estonia) D Glinka	3	7^{8}	6

=== Bottom half ===
First round
5	(Spain) P Llamas Ruiz	6	7^{7}
Alt	(Italy) L Nardi	1	6^{5}
WC	(Spain) Carles Hernández	3	6^{4}
Q	(Bulgaria) P Nesterov	6	7^{7}
Alt	(Spain) D Rincón	6	6
WC	(Spain) A Sánchez Quílez	2	4
(Denmark) A Holmgren	6	6^{1}	5
4	(Spain) P Martínez	2	7^{7}	7
7	(Italy) F Maestrelli	6	3	4
Q	(United Kingdom) O Tarvet	4	6	6
Q	(Switzerland) D Stricker	1	5
(Serbia) L Djere	6	7
(Lithuania) E Butvilas	6	4	5
Q	(Germany) MH Rehberg	1	6	7
LL	(Czech Republic) H Bartoň	7^{13}	6
2	(United Kingdom) T Samuel	6^{11}	3

Second round
5	(Spain) P Llamas Ruiz	3	7^{7}	6
Q	(Bulgaria) P Nesterov	6	6^{5}	3
Alt	(Spain) D Rincón	5	4
4	(Spain) P Martínez	7	6
Q	(United Kingdom) O Tarvet	4	6^{4}
(Serbia) L Djere	6	7^{7}
Q	(Germany) MH Rehberg	1	7^{7}	6^{3}
LL	(Czech Republic) H Bartoň	6	6^{1}	7^{7}

Quarterfinals
5	(Spain) P Llamas Ruiz	4	2^{r}
4	(Spain) P Martínez	6	4
(Serbia) L Djere	6	7
LL	(Czech Republic) H Bartoň	3	5

Semifinals
4	(Spain) P Martínez	4	2
(Serbia) L Djere	6	6
