= 2023 JC Ferrero Challenger Open – Singles =

Singles
- 2023 JC Ferrero Challenger Open

Final
- Champion: (France) Constant Lestienne
- Runner-up: (France) Hugo Grenier
- Score: 6–7^{(10–12)}, 6–2, 6–4

Events
Singles	Doubles
- JC Ferrero Challenger Open

Lukáš Klein was the defending champion but lost in the second round to Maximilian Marterer.

Constant Lestienne won the title after defeating Hugo Grenier 6–7^{(10–12)}, 6–2, 6–4 in the final.

== Seeds ==
1. (France) Constant Lestienne (champion)
2. (Slovakia) Alex Molčan (first round)
3. (Spain) Pedro Martínez (second round)
4. (France) Benoît Paire (second round)
5. (France) Arthur Cazaux (second round)
6. (Germany) Maximilian Marterer (semifinals)
7. (Argentina) Thiago Agustín Tirante (first round)
8. (Italy) Mattia Bellucci (second round)

== Draw ==
Key

- Q = Qualifier
- WC = Wild card
- LL = Lucky loser
- Alt = Alternate
- ITF = ITF entry
- PR = Protected ranking
- SR = Special ranking
- SE = Special exempt
- JE = Junior exempt
- JR = Junior Accelerator Programme entrant
- CO = College Accelerator Programme entrant
- NG = Next Gen Accelerator Program entrant
- w/o = Walkover
- r = Retired
- d = Defaulted

=== Finals ===
Semifinals
1	(France) Constant Lestienne	7^{7}	6
6	(Germany) Maximilian Marterer	6^{3}	4
(France) Hugo Grenier	4	6	6
(Austria) Dennis Novak	6	4	3

Final
1	(France) Constant Lestienne	6^{10}	6	6
(France) Hugo Grenier	7^{12}	2	4

=== Top half ===
First round
1	(France) C Lestienne	6	7
(Italy) F Gaio	1	5
WC	(Spain) Diego Augusto Barreto Sánchez	4	3
(United States) Em Nava	6	6
(Italy) F Maestrelli	4	6	4
WC	(Spain) M Landaluce	6	4	6
(Italy) R Brancaccio	2	1
5	(France) A Cazaux	6	6
4	(France) B Paire	6	6
Q	(Israel) D Cukierman	4	1
Q	(United States) M Damm	6	7^{7}
Q	(Spain) A Barroso Campos	4	6^{5}
(Slovakia) L Klein	6	6
LL	(United Kingdom) D Cox	3	2
(Spain) A Moro Cañas	4	4
6	(Germany) M Marterer	6	6

Second round
1	(France) C Lestienne	6	6
(United States) Em Nava	1	1
WC	(Spain) M Landaluce	4	6	6
5	(France) A Cazaux	6	2	3
4	(France) B Paire	2	3
Q	(United States) M Damm	6	6
(Slovakia) L Klein	3	5
6	(Germany) M Marterer	6	7

Quarterfinals
1	(France) C Lestienne	6	7^{7}
WC	(Spain) M Landaluce	3	6^{5}
Q	(United States) M Damm	5	5
6	(Germany) M Marterer	7	7

Semifinals
1	(France) C Lestienne	7^{7}	6
6	(Germany) M Marterer	6^{3}	4

=== Bottom half ===
First round
7	(Argentina) TA Tirante	4	4
Q	(Tunisia) M Echargui	6	6
(Austria) M Neuchrist	4	3
(France) H Grenier	6	6
Q	(United Kingdom) B Harris	6	6^{5}	6
(Turkey) A Çelikbilek	2	7^{7}	1
(Spain) P Carreño Busta	3	5
3	(Spain) P Martínez	6	7
8	(Italy) M Bellucci	6	7
Q	(Australia) A Santillan	4	5
(Bulgaria) A Andreev	6	1	4
(Sweden) E Ymer	4	6	6
(Portugal) F Ferreira Silva	6	6
WC	(United States) Dar Blanch	4	3
(Austria) D Novak	6	6
2	(Slovakia) A Molčan	1	3

Second round
Q	(Tunisia) M Echargui	4	4
(France) H Grenier	6	6
Q	(United Kingdom) B Harris	6	6
3	(Spain) P Martínez	1	2
8	(Italy) M Bellucci	6	6^{5}	3
(Sweden) E Ymer	3	7^{7}	6
(Portugal) F Ferreira Silva	5	6^{7}
(Austria) D Novak	7	7^{9}

Quarterfinals
(France) H Grenier	6	6
Q	(United Kingdom) B Harris	3	4
(Sweden) E Ymer	4	2
(Austria) D Novak	6	6

Semifinals
(France) H Grenier	4	6	6
(Austria) D Novak	6	4	3
