= 2024 JC Ferrero Challenger Open – Doubles =

Doubles
- 2024 JC Ferrero Challenger Open

Final
- Champions: (India) Anirudh Chandrasekar (India) Niki Kaliyanda Poonacha
- Runners-up: (Monaco) Romain Arneodo (Spain) Íñigo Cervantes
- Score: 7–6^{(7–2)}, 6–4

Events
Singles	Doubles
- JC Ferrero Challenger Open

Niki Kaliyanda Poonacha and Divij Sharan were the defending champions but chose to defend their title with different partners. Kaliyanda Poonacha partnered Anirudh Chandrasekar and successfully defended his title. Sharan partnered Stefano Travaglia but they withdrew from the tournament before their first round match.

Chandrasekar and Kaliyanda Poonacha won the title after defeating Romain Arneodo and Íñigo Cervantes 7–6^{(7–2)}, 6–4 in the final.

== Seeds ==
1. (Netherlands) Sander Arends / (United Kingdom) Luke Johnson (first round)
2. (India) Jeevan Nedunchezhiyan / (India) Vijay Sundar Prashanth (quarterfinals)
3. (Poland) Karol Drzewiecki / (Poland) Piotr Matuszewski (first round)
4. (India) Anirudh Chandrasekar / (India) Niki Kaliyanda Poonacha (champions)

== Draw ==
Key

- Q = Qualifier
- WC = Wild card
- LL = Lucky loser
- Alt = Alternate
- ITF = ITF entry
- PR = Protected ranking
- SR = Special ranking
- SE = Special exempt
- JE = Junior exempt
- JR = Junior Accelerator Programme entrant
- CO = College Accelerator Programme entrant
- NG = Next Gen Accelerator Program entrant
- w/o = Walkover
- r = Retired
- d = Defaulted

=== Draw ===
First round
1	(Netherlands) S Arends (United Kingdom) L Johnson	1	6	[8]
(Peru) A Merino (Germany) C Negritu	6	3	[10]
WC	(United States) Dali Blanch (Spain) Carles Hernández	6	6^{5}	[6]
(Monaco) R Arneodo (Spain) Í Cervantes	3	7^{7}	[10]
3	(Poland) K Drzewiecki (Poland) P Matuszewski	6^{5}	4
Alt	(Spain) Rafael Izquierdo Luque (Spain) Iván Marrero Curbelo	7^{7}	6
(Switzerland) J Kym (Germany) R Molleker	6	6
WC	(Spain) Diego Augusto Barreto Sánchez (Spain) A Manzanera Pertusa	2	3
(Switzerland) J Paul (Czech Republic) M Vocel	6	7^{7}
PR	(Croatia) Z Babić (United States) N Moreno de Alboran	3	6^{3}
(Austria) D Pichler (Spain) D Vega Hernández	2	2
4	(India) A Chandrasekar (India) N Kaliyanda Poonacha	6	6
(Belgium) M Geerts (Finland) P Niklas-Salminen	3	5
(Romania) C Crețu (France) V Royer	6	7
(France) R Bertrand (France) B Paire	6^{5}	3
2	(India) J Nedunchezhiyan (India) VS Prashanth	7^{7}	6

Quarterfinals
(Peru) A Merino (Germany) C Negritu	6^{3}	4
(Monaco) R Arneodo (Spain) Í Cervantes	7^{7}	6
Alt	(Spain) R Izquierdo Luque (Spain) I Marrero Curbelo	2	4
(Switzerland) J Kym (Germany) R Molleker	6	6
(Switzerland) J Paul (Czech Republic) M Vocel	6^{5}	6	[7]
4	(India) A Chandrasekar (India) N Kaliyanda Poonacha	7^{7}	3	[10]
(Romania) C Crețu (France) V Royer	6	6^{8}	[10]
2	(India) J Nedunchezhiyan (India) VS Prashanth	3	7^{10}	[7]

Semifinals
(Monaco) R Arneodo (Spain) Í Cervantes	6	7^{7}
(Switzerland) J Kym (Germany) R Molleker	4	6^{3}
4	(India) A Chandrasekar (India) N Kaliyanda Poonacha	6	7^{7}
(Romania) C Crețu (France) V Royer	3	6^{5}

Final
(Monaco) R Arneodo (Spain) Í Cervantes	6^{2}	4
4	(India) A Chandrasekar (India) N Kaliyanda Poonacha	7^{7}	6
