= 2023 JC Ferrero Challenger Open – Doubles =

Doubles
- 2023 JC Ferrero Challenger Open

Final
- Champions: (India) Niki Kaliyanda Poonacha (India) Divij Sharan
- Runners-up: (India) Jeevan Nedunchezhiyan (Australia) John-Patrick Smith
- Score: 6–4, 3–6, [10–7]

Events
Singles	Doubles
- JC Ferrero Challenger Open

Robin Haase and Albano Olivetti were the defending champions but chose not to defend their title.

Niki Kaliyanda Poonacha and Divij Sharan won the title after defeating Jeevan Nedunchezhiyan and John-Patrick Smith 6–4, 3–6, [10–7] in the final.

== Seeds ==
1. (Mexico) Miguel Ángel Reyes-Varela / (Spain) David Vega Hernández (quarterfinals)
2. (Colombia) Nicolás Barrientos / (Sweden) André Göransson (quarterfinals)
3. (India) Jeevan Nedunchezhiyan / (Australia) John-Patrick Smith (final)
4. (India) Niki Kaliyanda Poonacha / (India) Divij Sharan (champions)

== Draw ==
Key

- Q = Qualifier
- WC = Wild card
- LL = Lucky loser
- Alt = Alternate
- ITF = ITF entry
- PR = Protected ranking
- SR = Special ranking
- SE = Special exempt
- JE = Junior exempt
- JR = Junior Accelerator Programme entrant
- CO = College Accelerator Programme entrant
- NG = Next Gen Accelerator Program entrant
- w/o = Walkover
- r = Retired
- d = Defaulted

First round
1	(Mexico) MÁ Reyes-Varela (Spain) D Vega Hernández	6	6
Alt	(United States) Jack Vance (United States) Tennyson Whiting	0	1
(Spain) John Echeverría (Spain) A Moro Cañas	4	4
(Italy) M Bellucci (Tunisia) M Echargui	6	6
4	(India) N Kaliyanda Poonacha (India) D Sharan	7^{7}	2	[12]
Svyatoslav Gulin (Slovakia) L Pokorný	6^{4}	6	[10]
(Israel) D Cukierman (United Kingdom) J Paris	6	6
(Portugal) F Ferreira Silva (Italy) F Maestrelli	2	4
(United Kingdom) B Harris (Australia) A Santillan	7^{8}	6
WC	(Spain) A Manzanera Pertusa (United States) Em Nava	6^{6}	4
(Austria) M Neuchrist (Ukraine) V Orlov	4	3
3	(India) J Nedunchezhiyan (Australia) J-P Smith	6	6
(United States) N Chappell (United States) M Damm	7^{7}	7^{7}
(Spain) Í Cervantes (Slovakia) I Zelenay	6^{4}	6^{2}
WC	(United States) Dali Blanch (United States) Dar Blanch
2	(Colombia) N Barrientos (Sweden) A Göransson	w/o

Quarterfinals
1	(Mexico) MÁ Reyes-Varela (Spain) D Vega Hernández	5	6	[8]
(Italy) M Bellucci (Tunisia) M Echargui	7	3	[10]
4	(India) N Kaliyanda Poonacha (India) D Sharan	6	6
(Israel) D Cukierman (United Kingdom) J Paris	1	3
(United Kingdom) B Harris (Australia) A Santillan	2	2
3	(India) J Nedunchezhiyan (Australia) J-P Smith	6	6
(United States) N Chappell (United States) M Damm	7	6
2	(Colombia) N Barrientos (Sweden) A Göransson	5	3

Semifinals
(Italy) M Bellucci (Tunisia) M Echargui	1	7	[8]
4	(India) N Kaliyanda Poonacha (India) D Sharan	6	5	[10]
3	(India) J Nedunchezhiyan (Australia) J-P Smith	6	3	[12]
(United States) N Chappell (United States) M Damm	4	6	[10]

Final
4	(India) N Kaliyanda Poonacha (India) D Sharan	6	3	[10]
3	(India) J Nedunchezhiyan (Australia) J-P Smith	4	6	[7]
