= 2018 JC Ferrero Challenger Open – Singles =

Singles
- 2018 JC Ferrero Challenger Open

Final
- Champion: (Spain) Pablo Andújar
- Runner-up: (Australia) Alex de Minaur
- Score: 7–6^{(7–5)}, 6–1

Events
| Singles | Doubles |
- JC Ferrero Challenger Open

This was the first edition of the tournament.

Pablo Andújar won the title after defeating Alex de Minaur 7–6^{(7–5)}, 6–1 in the final.

== Seeds ==
1. (Spain) Roberto Carballés Baena (semifinals)
2. (Italy) Marco Cecchinato (semifinals)
3. (Italy) Stefano Travaglia (first round)
4. (Australia) Alex de Minaur (final)
5. (Spain) Marcel Granollers (quarterfinals)
6. (Russia) Alexey Vatutin (first round)
7. (Italy) Alessandro Giannessi (second round, retired)
8. (France) Kenny de Schepper (first round)

== Draw ==
Key

- Q = Qualifier
- WC = Wild card
- LL = Lucky loser
- Alt = Alternate
- ITF = ITF entry
- PR = Protected ranking
- SR = Special ranking
- SE = Special exempt
- JE = Junior exempt
- JR = Junior Accelerator Programme entrant
- CO = College Accelerator Programme entrant
- NG = Next Gen Accelerator Program entrant
- w/o = Walkover
- r = Retired
- d = Defaulted

=== Finals ===
Semifinals
1 | (Spain) Roberto Carballés Baena | 2 | 4
4 | (Australia) Alex de Minaur | 6 | 6
WC | (Spain) Pablo Andújar | 6 | 5 | 6
2 | (Italy) Marco Cecchinato | 4 | 7 | 4

Final
4 | (Australia) Alex de Minaur | 6^{5} | 1
WC | (Spain) Pablo Andújar | 7^{7} | 6

=== Top half ===
First round
1 | (Spain) R Carballés Baena | 6 | 6
(United States) N Rubin | 3 | 4
(Spain) E López Pérez | 2 | 4
(Italy) A Arnaboldi | 6 | 6
(Italy) M Viola | 4 | 2
Q | (Spain) M Vilella Martínez | 6 | 6
Q | (Russia) I Gakhov | 1 | 6^{1}
7 | (Italy) A Giannessi | 6 | 7^{7}
4 | (Australia) A de Minaur | 6 | 6
(Spain) R Ojeda Lara | 3 | 3
WC | (Spain) Carlos Boluda-Purkiss | 6 | 6
(Czech Republic) Z Kolář | 2 | 3
(Spain) J Martí | 1 | 1
Q | (Spain) D Gimeno Traver | 6 | 6
WC | (Spain) B Zapata Miralles | 0 | 2
5 | (Spain) M Granollers | 6 | 6

Second round
1 | (Spain) R Carballés Baena | 6 | 6
(Italy) A Arnaboldi | 3 | 2
Q | (Spain) M Vilella Martínez | 5
7 | (Italy) A Giannessi | 2^{r}
4 | (Australia) A de Minaur | 6 | 2 | 6
WC | (Spain) C Boluda-Purkiss | 2 | 6 | 3
Q | (Spain) D Gimeno Traver | 3 | 3
5 | (Spain) M Granollers | 6 | 6

Quarterfinals
1 | (Spain) R Carballés Baena | 7 | 3 | 6
Q | (Spain) M Vilella Martínez | 5 | 6 | 0
4 | (Australia) A de Minaur | 6 | 7^{7}
5 | (Spain) M Granollers | 4 | 6^{4}

Semifinals
1 | (Spain) R Carballés Baena | 2 | 4
4 | (Australia) A de Minaur | 6 | 6

=== Bottom half ===
First round
8 | (France) K de Schepper | 4 | 3
(Spain) J Munar | 6 | 6
WC | (Spain) P Andújar | 6 | 6
(Portugal) G Oliveira | 2 | 2
(Canada) F Auger-Aliassime | 7 | 7
WC | (Spain) A Davidovich Fokina | 5 | 5
(Argentina) G Andreozzi | 7^{7} | 6
3 | (Italy) S Travaglia | 6^{5} | 4
6 | (Russia) A Vatutin | 3 | 4
(Hungary) A Balázs | 6 | 6
(Spain) P Martínez | 6^{7} | 2
Q | (Italy) GM Moroni | 7^{9} | 6
(Italy) L Giustino | 5
(Spain) C Taberner | 1^{r}
LL | (Italy) F Gaio | 3 | 4
2 | (Italy) M Cecchinato | 6 | 6

Second round
(Spain) J Munar | 6^{3} | 6 | 2
WC | (Spain) P Andújar | 7^{7} | 1 | 6
(Canada) F Auger-Aliassime | 6^{2} | 6 | 4
(Argentina) G Andreozzi | 7^{7} | 2 | 6
(Hungary) A Balázs | 6 | 5 | 4
Q | (Italy) GM Moroni | 4 | 7 | 6
(Italy) L Giustino | 3 | 5
2 | (Italy) M Cecchinato | 6 | 7

Quarterfinals
WC | (Spain) P Andújar | 1 | 6 | 6
(Argentina) G Andreozzi | 6 | 4 | 4
Q | (Italy) GM Moroni | 4 | 4
2 | (Italy) M Cecchinato | 6 | 6

Semifinals
WC | (Spain) P Andújar | 6 | 5 | 6
2 | (Italy) M Cecchinato | 4 | 7 | 4
