= 2022 JC Ferrero Challenger Open – Doubles =

Doubles
- 2022 JC Ferrero Challenger Open

Final
- Champions: (Netherlands) Robin Haase (France) Albano Olivetti
- Runners-up: (Uzbekistan) Sanjar Fayziev (Uzbekistan) Sergey Fomin
- Score: 7–6^{(7–5)}, 7–5

Events
Singles	Doubles
- JC Ferrero Challenger Open

Denys Molchanov and David Vega Hernández were the defending champions but chose not to defend their title.

Robin Haase and Albano Olivetti won the title after defeating Sanjar Fayziev and Sergey Fomin 7–6^{(7–5)}, 7–5 in the final.

== Seeds ==
1. (Netherlands) Robin Haase / (France) Albano Olivetti (champions)
2. (Ukraine) Vladyslav Manafov / (Ukraine) Oleg Prihodko (first round)
3. (Netherlands) Jesper de Jong / (Netherlands) Bart Stevens (semifinals)
4. (Switzerland) Luca Margaroli / (Spain) Adrián Menéndez Maceiras (first round)

== Draw ==
Key

- Q = Qualifier
- WC = Wild card
- LL = Lucky loser
- Alt = Alternate
- ITF = ITF entry
- PR = Protected ranking
- SR = Special ranking
- SE = Special exempt
- JE = Junior exempt
- JR = Junior Accelerator Programme entrant
- CO = College Accelerator Programme entrant
- NG = Next Gen Accelerator Program entrant
- w/o = Walkover
- r = Retired
- d = Defaulted

First round
1	(Netherlands) R Haase (France) A Olivetti	w/o
(France) G Blancaneaux (Belgium) M Geerts
Alt	(Australia) A Santillan (Australia) A Taylor	6	6
(Italy) R Brancaccio (Canada) S Diez	4	1
3	(Netherlands) J de Jong (Netherlands) B Stevens	5	6	[11]
WC	(Spain) Diego Augusto Barreto Sánchez (United States) Dali Blanch	7	4	[9]
(Portugal) J Domingues (Portugal) Gonçalo Falcão	3	6	[6]
(Romania) A Jecan (Ukraine) O Krutykh	6	2	[10]
WC	(Spain) A Manzanera Pertusa (Spain) Samuel Martínez Arjona	1	3
(Italy) S Caruso (Italy) F Gaio	6	6
(Portugal) F Ferreira Silva (Italy) L Giustino	6	6
4	(Switzerland) L Margaroli (Spain) A Menéndez Maceiras	1	4
(Spain) N Álvarez Varona (France) H Mayot	3	6	[11]
(United Kingdom) B Harris (Canada) K Stevenson	6	2	[13]
(Uzbekistan) S Fayziev (Uzbekistan) S Fomin	6	6
2	(Ukraine) V Manafov (Ukraine) O Prihodko	2	4

Quarterfinals
1	(Netherlands) R Haase (France) A Olivetti	6	6
Alt	(Australia) A Santillan (Australia) A Taylor	3	4
3	(Netherlands) J de Jong (Netherlands) B Stevens	6	6
(Romania) A Jecan (Ukraine) O Krutykh	1	0
(Italy) S Caruso (Italy) F Gaio	6	7^{7}
(Portugal) F Ferreira Silva (Italy) L Giustino	2	6^{3}
(United Kingdom) B Harris (Canada) K Stevenson	7	2	[4]
(Uzbekistan) S Fayziev (Uzbekistan) S Fomin	5	6	[10]

Semifinals
1	(Netherlands) R Haase (France) A Olivetti	7^{9}	7^{13}
3	(Netherlands) J de Jong (Netherlands) B Stevens	6^{7}	6^{11}
(Italy) S Caruso (Italy) F Gaio	4	6	[7]
(Uzbekistan) S Fayziev (Uzbekistan) S Fomin	6	4	[10]

Final
1	(Netherlands) R Haase (France) A Olivetti	7^{7}	7
(Uzbekistan) S Fayziev (Uzbekistan) S Fomin	6^{5}	5
