= 2025 Villena Open – Doubles =

Doubles
- 2025 Villena Open

Final
- Champions: (Belgium) Sander Gillé (Netherlands) Sem Verbeek
- Runners-up: (Czech Republic) Petr Nouza (Czech Republic) Patrik Rikl
- Score: 6–3, 6–4

Events
Singles	Doubles
- Villena Open

Anirudh Chandrasekar and Niki Kaliyanda Poonacha were the defending champions but chose not to defend their title.

Sander Gillé and Sem Verbeek won the title after defeating Petr Nouza and Patrik Rikl 6–3, 6–4 in the final.

== Seeds ==
1. (France) Théo Arribagé / (Germany) Constantin Frantzen (semifinals)
2. (Belgium) Sander Gillé / (Netherlands) Sem Verbeek (champions)
3. (Czech Republic) Petr Nouza / (Czech Republic) Patrik Rikl (final)
4. (United Kingdom) Joshua Paris / (United States) Jackson Withrow (semifinals)

== Draw ==
Key

- Q = Qualifier
- WC = Wild card
- LL = Lucky loser
- Alt = Alternate
- ITF = ITF entry
- PR = Protected ranking
- SR = Special ranking
- SE = Special exempt
- JE = Junior exempt
- JR = Junior Accelerator Programme entrant
- CO = College Accelerator Programme entrant
- NG = Next Gen Accelerator Program entrant
- w/o = Walkover
- r = Retired
- d = Defaulted

=== Draw ===
First round
1	(France) T Arribagé (Germany) C Frantzen	6	6
(Peru) A Merino (Germany) C Negritu	4	4
(Republic of Ireland) C Barry (France) M Westphal	6^{6}	3
(Czech Republic) H Bartoň (Czech Republic) M Vocel	7^{8}	6
3	(Czech Republic) P Nouza (Czech Republic) P Rikl	7^{7}	6
(Austria) N Oberleitner (Czech Republic) M Vrbenský	6^{5}	3
I Liutarevich (Italy) G Ricca	6	7
WC	(United States) Dar Blanch (Bulgaria) Anas Mazdrashki	4	5
WC	(United States) Dali Blanch (Spain) Carles Hernández	2	6	[8]
(United States) T Hilderbrand (United States) M Kiger	6	4	[10]
Alt	(Ivory Coast) E Coulibaly (Spain) John Echeverría	6^{5}	6^{2}
4	(United Kingdom) J Paris (United States) J Withrow	7^{7}	7^{7}
(Norway) V Durasovic (Norway) L Hellum Lilleengen	4	7^{9}	[10]
(Spain) A Barroso Campos (Spain) I Montes de la Torre	6	6^{7}	[8]
Alt	(Italy) Lorenzo Carboni (Italy) Luca Potenza	4	2
2	(Belgium) S Gillé (Netherlands) S Verbeek	6	6

Quarterfinals
1	(France) T Arribagé (Germany) C Frantzen	6	7
(Czech Republic) H Bartoň (Czech Republic) M Vocel	3	5
3	(Czech Republic) P Nouza (Czech Republic) P Rikl	6	4	[10]
I Liutarevich (Italy) G Ricca	3	6	[7]
(United States) T Hilderbrand (United States) M Kiger	6^{5}	3
4	(United Kingdom) J Paris (United States) J Withrow	7^{7}	6
(Norway) V Durasovic (Norway) L Hellum Lilleengen	5	4
2	(Belgium) S Gillé (Netherlands) S Verbeek	7	6

Semifinals
1	(France) T Arribagé (Germany) C Frantzen	5	4
3	(Czech Republic) P Nouza (Czech Republic) P Rikl	7	6
4	(United Kingdom) J Paris (United States) J Withrow	6^{2}	7^{9}	[2]
2	(Belgium) S Gillé (Netherlands) S Verbeek	7^{7}	6^{7}	[10]

Final
3	(Czech Republic) P Nouza (Czech Republic) P Rikl	3	4
2	(Belgium) S Gillé (Netherlands) S Verbeek	6	6
