= 2025 Villena Open – Singles =

Singles
- 2025 Villena Open

Final
- Champion: (Spain) Pablo Carreño Busta
- Runner-up: (France) Hugo Grenier
- Score: 4–6, 6–1, 6–4

Events
Singles	Doubles
- Villena Open

Kamil Majchrzak was the defending champion but chose not to defend his title.

Pablo Carreño Busta won the title after defeating Hugo Grenier 4–6, 6–1, 6–4 in the final.

== Seeds ==
1. (Germany) Jan-Lennard Struff (first round)
2. (Chile) Nicolás Jarry (first round)
3. (Spain) Pablo Carreño Busta (champion)
4. (Slovakia) Lukáš Klein (first round)
5. (Spain) Martín Landaluce (quarterfinals)
6. (Tunisia) Moez Echargui (second round)
7. (Switzerland) Jérôme Kym (withdrew)
8. (Spain) Daniel Mérida (semifinals)

== Draw ==
Key

- Q = Qualifier
- WC = Wild card
- LL = Lucky loser
- Alt = Alternate
- ITF = ITF entry
- PR = Protected ranking
- SR = Special ranking
- SE = Special exempt
- JE = Junior exempt
- JR = Junior Accelerator Programme entrant
- CO = College Accelerator Programme entrant
- NG = Next Gen Accelerator Program entrant
- w/o = Walkover
- r = Retired
- d = Defaulted

=== Finals ===
Semifinals
Q	(Czech Republic) Petr Brunclík	4	3
3	(Spain) Pablo Carreño Busta	6	6
8	(Spain) Daniel Mérida	4	6^{4}
(France) Hugo Grenier	6	7^{7}

Final
3	(Spain) Pablo Carreño Busta	4	6	6
(France) Hugo Grenier	6	1	4

=== Top half ===
First round
1	(Germany) J-L Struff	4	2
(Lithuania) E Butvilas	6	6
WC	(United States) Dar Blanch	4	5
LL	(Italy) Luca Potenza	6	7
Q	(Austria) N Oberleitner	7^{8}	6
(France) A Géa	6^{6}	4
Q	(Czech Republic) Petr Brunclík	7	6
LL	(United Kingdom) G Hussey	5	1
3	(Spain) P Carreño Busta	6	4	6
WC	(United States) Dali Blanch	2	6	3
(Germany) C Negritu	6	5	4
(Ivory Coast) E Coulibaly	3	7	6
Q	(Italy) Lorenzo Carboni	2	1
(United Kingdom) O Crawford	6	6
WC	(Spain) I Montes de la Torre	4	6	3
5	(Spain) M Landaluce	6	4	6

Second round
(Lithuania) E Butvilas	1	4
LL	(Italy) L Potenza	6	6
Q	(Austria) N Oberleitner	2	2
Q	(Czech Republic) P Brunclík	6	6
3	(Spain) P Carreño Busta	6	6
(Ivory Coast) E Coulibaly	4	3
(United Kingdom) O Crawford	4	4
5	(Spain) M Landaluce	6	6

Quarterfinals
LL	(Italy) L Potenza	4	3
Q	(Czech Republic) P Brunclík	6	6
3	(Spain) P Carreño Busta	6	6
5	(Spain) M Landaluce	3	1

Semifinals
Q	(Czech Republic) P Brunclík	4	3
3	(Spain) P Carreño Busta	6	6

=== Bottom half ===
First round
8	(Spain) D Mérida	6	6
(United Kingdom) R Peniston	4	2
Alt	(Spain) A Ramos Viñolas	2	4
Q	(Poland) M Kaśnikowski	6	6
Q	(Spain) A Barroso Campos	3	1
(United Kingdom) G Loffhagen	6	6
(Norway) V Durasovic	7^{7}	6
4	(Slovakia) L Klein	6^{4}	2
6	(Tunisia) M Echargui	6	6
Q	(Italy) R Brancaccio	4	4
(Czech Republic) H Bartoň	3	3
(France) H Grenier	6	6
(Bulgaria) D Kuzmanov	7^{7}	6
(Belgium) K Coppejans	6^{3}	4
(Germany) T Gentzsch	7^{7}	6
2	(Chile) N Jarry	6^{4}	3

Second round
8	(Spain) D Mérida	6	6
Q	(Poland) M Kaśnikowski	4	3
(United Kingdom) G Loffhagen	4	6	6
(Norway) V Durasovic	6	3	2
6	(Tunisia) M Echargui	4	4
(France) H Grenier	6	6
(Bulgaria) D Kuzmanov	4	4
(Germany) T Gentzsch	6	6

Quarterfinals
8	(Spain) D Mérida	6	1	7
(United Kingdom) G Loffhagen	1	6	5
(France) H Grenier	7	6
(Germany) T Gentzsch	5	2

Semifinals
8	(Spain) D Mérida	4	6^{4}
(France) H Grenier	6	7^{7}
