= 2018 JC Ferrero Challenger Open – Doubles =

Doubles
- 2018 JC Ferrero Challenger Open

Final
- Champions: (Netherlands) Wesley Koolhof (New Zealand) Artem Sitak
- Runners-up: (Argentina) Guido Andreozzi (Uruguay) Ariel Behar
- Score: 6–3, 6–2

Events
Singles	Doubles
- JC Ferrero Challenger Open

This was the first edition of the tournament. Wesley Koolhof and Artem Sitak won the title after defeating Guido Andreozzi and Ariel Behar 6–3, 6–2 in the final.

== Seeds ==
1. (Netherlands) Wesley Koolhof / (New Zealand) Artem Sitak (champions)
2. (Germany) Andre Begemann / (India) Divij Sharan (first round)
3. (France) Jonathan Eysseric / (France) Hugo Nys (first round)
4. (Argentina) Guido Andreozzi / (Uruguay) Ariel Behar (final)

== Draw ==
Key

- Q = Qualifier
- WC = Wild card
- LL = Lucky loser
- Alt = Alternate
- ITF = ITF entry
- PR = Protected ranking
- SR = Special ranking
- SE = Special exempt
- JE = Junior exempt
- JR = Junior Accelerator Programme entrant
- CO = College Accelerator Programme entrant
- NG = Next Gen Accelerator Program entrant
- w/o = Walkover
- r = Retired
- d = Defaulted

First round
1	(Netherlands) W Koolhof (New Zealand) A Sitak	6	6
(Spain) Í Cervantes (Spain) D Marrero	4	1
Alt	(Italy) A Arnaboldi (Italy) A Giannessi	7	7
(Australia) R Junaid (Portugal) G Oliveira	5	5
3	(France) J Eysseric (France) H Nys	2	4
WC	(Spain) P Martínez (Spain) D Vega Hernández	6	6
WC	(Australia) A de Minaur (Spain) S Gutiérrez Ferrol	2	4
(Belarus) Y Shyla (Belarus) A Vasilevski	6	6
WC	(Spain) Carlos Boluda-Purkiss (Spain) M Vilella Martínez	6	6
(France) K de Schepper (Spain) E López Pérez	4	2
(Poland) T Bednarek (Poland) G Panfil	2	6	[8]
4	(Argentina) G Andreozzi (Uruguay) A Behar	6	3	[10]
(Italy) A Motti (Italy) S Travaglia	6	7^{7}
(Czech Republic) Z Kolář (Sweden) A Siljeström	1	6^{3}
(United Kingdom) S Clayton (Netherlands) D Pel	6	5	[10]
2	(Germany) A Begemann (India) D Sharan	4	7	[6]

Quarterfinals
1	(Netherlands) W Koolhof (New Zealand) A Sitak	w/o
Alt	(Italy) A Arnaboldi (Italy) A Giannessi
WC	(Spain) P Martínez (Spain) D Vega Hernández	6	4	[10]
(Belarus) Y Shyla (Belarus) A Vasilevski	4	6	[8]
WC	(Spain) C Boluda-Purkiss (Spain) M Vilella Martínez	3	1
4	(Argentina) G Andreozzi (Uruguay) A Behar	6	6
(Italy) A Motti (Italy) S Travaglia	6	6
(United Kingdom) S Clayton (Netherlands) D Pel	3	2

Semifinals
1	(Netherlands) W Koolhof (New Zealand) A Sitak	5	6	[10]
WC	(Spain) P Martínez (Spain) D Vega Hernández	7	4	[5]
4	(Argentina) G Andreozzi (Uruguay) A Behar	6	6
(Italy) A Motti (Italy) S Travaglia	0	2

Final
1	(Netherlands) W Koolhof (New Zealand) A Sitak	6	6
4	(Argentina) G Andreozzi (Uruguay) A Behar	3	2
