= 2021 JC Ferrero Challenger Open – Doubles =

Doubles
- 2021 JC Ferrero Challenger Open

Final
- Champions: (Ukraine) Denys Molchanov (Spain) David Vega Hernández
- Runners-up: (Monaco) Romain Arneodo (Australia) Matt Reid
- Score: 6–4, 6–2

Events
Singles	Doubles
- JC Ferrero Challenger Open

Enzo Couacaud and Albano Olivetti were the defending champions but chose not to defend their title.

Denys Molchanov and David Vega Hernández won the title after defeating Romain Arneodo and Matt Reid 6–4, 6–2 in the final.

== Seeds ==
1. (Sweden) André Göransson / (Poland) Szymon Walków (first round)
2. (Monaco) Romain Arneodo / (Australia) Matt Reid (final)
3. (Ukraine) Denys Molchanov / (Spain) David Vega Hernández (champions)
4. (United States) Robert Galloway / (United States) Alex Lawson (semifinals)

== Draw ==
Key

- Q = Qualifier
- WC = Wild card
- LL = Lucky loser
- Alt = Alternate
- ITF = ITF entry
- PR = Protected ranking
- SR = Special ranking
- SE = Special exempt
- JE = Junior exempt
- JR = Junior Accelerator Programme entrant
- CO = College Accelerator Programme entrant
- NG = Next Gen Accelerator Program entrant
- w/o = Walkover
- r = Retired
- d = Defaulted

First round
1	(Sweden) A Göransson (Poland) S Walków	4	2
(India) J Nedunchezhiyan (India) P Raja	6	6
WC	(Spain) D Marrero (United States) Dhruva Mulye	6	2
(Kazakhstan) D Popko (Kazakhstan) D Yevseyev	1	0^{r}
3	(Ukraine) D Molchanov (Spain) D Vega Hernández	6	6
(Russia) T Gabashvili (Spain) N Kuhn	1	2
(Croatia) B Gojo (Poland) K Żuk	6	6
(India) S Balaji (India) R Ramanathan	4	3
(Austria) L Miedler (India) D Sharan	6^{2}	4
WC	(Spain) Diego Augusto Barreto Sánchez (Spain) D Rincón	7^{7}	6
(Spain) A Menéndez Maceiras (Spain) M Vilella Martínez	6	4	[6]
4	(United States) R Galloway (United States) A Lawson	4	6	[10]
(Croatia) A Šančić (New Zealand) A Sitak	3	6	[6]
WC	(United States) Em Nava (Spain) F Verdasco	6	4	[10]
(Poland) K Drzewiecki (Poland) P Matuszewski	6	3	[5]
2	(Monaco) R Arneodo (Australia) M Reid	3	6	[10]

Quarterfinals
(India) J Nedunchezhiyan (India) P Raja	6	6
WC	(Spain) D Marrero (United States) D Mulye	2	3
3	(Ukraine) D Molchanov (Spain) D Vega Hernández	6	1	[12]
(Croatia) B Gojo (Poland) K Żuk	3	6	[10]
WC	(Spain) DA Barreto Sánchez (Spain) D Rincón	1	6^{4}
4	(United States) R Galloway (United States) A Lawson	6	7^{7}
WC	(United States) Em Nava (Spain) F Verdasco
2	(Monaco) R Arneodo (Australia) M Reid	w/o

Semifinals
(India) J Nedunchezhiyan (India) P Raja	4	4
3	(Ukraine) D Molchanov (Spain) D Vega Hernández	6	6
4	(United States) R Galloway (United States) A Lawson	4	4
2	(Monaco) R Arneodo (Australia) M Reid	6	6

Final
3	(Ukraine) D Molchanov (Spain) D Vega Hernández	6	6
2	(Monaco) R Arneodo (Australia) M Reid	4	2
