= 2026 Ferrero Challenger – Doubles =

Doubles
- 2026 Ferrero Challenger

Final
- Champions: (United States) Benjamin Kittay (Japan) Takeru Yuzuki
- Runners-up: (Israel) Daniel Cukierman (Brazil) Fernando Romboli
- Score: 6–4, 5–7, [10–7]

Events
Singles	Doubles
- Ferrero Challenger

Sander Gillé and Sem Verbeek were the defending champions but chose not to defend their title.

Benjamin Kittay and Takeru Yuzuki won the title after defeating Daniel Cukierman and Fernando Romboli 6–4, 5–7, [10–7] in the final.

== Seeds ==
1. (New Zealand) Finn Reynolds / (New Zealand) James Watt (semifinals)
2. (Germany) Hendrik Jebens / (Czech Republic) Michael Vrbenský (quarterfinals)
3. (Argentina) Andrés Molteni / (Spain) David Vega Hernández (quarterfinals)
4. (Israel) Daniel Cukierman / (Brazil) Fernando Romboli (final)

== Draw ==
Key

- Q = Qualifier
- WC = Wild card
- LL = Lucky loser
- Alt = Alternate
- ITF = ITF entry
- PR = Protected ranking
- SR = Special ranking
- SE = Special exempt
- JE = Junior exempt
- JR = Junior Accelerator Programme entrant
- CO = College Accelerator Programme entrant
- NG = Next Gen Accelerator Program entrant
- w/o = Walkover
- r = Retired
- d = Defaulted

First round
1	(New Zealand) F Reynolds (New Zealand) J Watt	6	6
(Poland) M Kaśnikowski (Italy) F Maestrelli	1	4
(Serbia) S Latinović (Croatia) M Poljičak	4	3
WC	(Spain) Enrique Carrascosa Díaz (Spain) Maxi Carrascosa Díaz	6	6
3	(Argentina) A Molteni (Spain) D Vega Hernández	7	6
WC	(Spain) A Manzanera Pertusa (Brazil) Thomas Miranda	5	3
(United States) B Kittay (Japan) T Yuzuki	7^{7}	7
(Bulgaria) A Genov (United Kingdom) M Whitehouse	6^{4}	5
(United States) T Hilderbrand (Romania) B Pavel	6	6^{3}	[9]
(Romania) V Cornea (Czech Republic) D Poljak	4	7^{7}	[11]
Alt	(India) VS Prashanth (United States) J Sheehy	6^{3}	2
4	(Israel) D Cukierman (Brazil) F Romboli	7^{7}	6
(Netherlands) J Jans (Belgium) J Vliegen	6^{6}	6	[11]
(Czech Republic) H Bartoň (Czech Republic) F Duda	7^{8}	4	[9]
(India) A Kadhe (Antigua and Barbuda) J Maginley	2	6^{2}
2	(Germany) H Jebens (Czech Republic) M Vrbenský	6	7^{7}

Quarterfinals
1	(New Zealand) F Reynolds (New Zealand) J Watt	6	6
WC	(Spain) E Carrascosa Díaz (Spain) M Carrascosa Díaz	0	3
3	(Argentina) A Molteni (Spain) D Vega Hernández	5	3
(United States) B Kittay (Japan) T Yuzuki	7	6
(Romania) V Cornea (Czech Republic) D Poljak	2	3
4	(Israel) D Cukierman (Brazil) F Romboli	6	6
(Netherlands) J Jans (Belgium) J Vliegen	6	6
2	(Germany) H Jebens (Czech Republic) M Vrbenský	2	4

Semifinals
1	(New Zealand) F Reynolds (New Zealand) J Watt	3	5
(United States) B Kittay (Japan) T Yuzuki	6	7
4	(Israel) D Cukierman (Brazil) F Romboli	7	6
(Netherlands) J Jans (Belgium) J Vliegen	5	4

Final
(United States) B Kittay (Japan) T Yuzuki	6	5	[10]
4	(Israel) D Cukierman (Brazil) F Romboli	4	7	[7]
