= 2021 JC Ferrero Challenger Open – Singles =

Singles
- 2021 JC Ferrero Challenger Open

Final
- Champion: (France) Constant Lestienne
- Runner-up: (France) Hugo Grenier
- Score: 6–4, 6–3

Events
Singles	Doubles
- JC Ferrero Challenger Open

Carlos Alcaraz was the defending champion but chose not to defend his title.

Constant Lestienne won the title after defeating Hugo Grenier 6–4, 6–3 in the final.

== Seeds ==
1. (Spain) Feliciano López (second round)
2. (Spain) Fernando Verdasco (second round)
3. (Germany) Oscar Otte (semifinals)
4. (France) Quentin Halys (first round)
5. (Kazakhstan) Dmitry Popko (first round)
6. (Poland) Kacper Żuk (second round)
7. (Spain) Mario Vilella Martínez (second round)
8. (Portugal) João Sousa (semifinals)

== Draw ==
Key

- Q = Qualifier
- WC = Wild card
- LL = Lucky loser
- Alt = Alternate
- ITF = ITF entry
- PR = Protected ranking
- SR = Special ranking
- SE = Special exempt
- JE = Junior exempt
- JR = Junior Accelerator Programme entrant
- CO = College Accelerator Programme entrant
- NG = Next Gen Accelerator Program entrant
- w/o = Walkover
- r = Retired
- d = Defaulted

=== Finals ===
Semifinals
(France) Hugo Grenier	6	6^{3}	6
3	(Germany) Oscar Otte	3	7^{7}	4
8	(Portugal) João Sousa	4	6^{5}
(France) Constant Lestienne	6	7^{7}

Final
(France) Hugo Grenier	4	3
(France) Constant Lestienne	6	6

=== Top half ===
First round
1/WC	(Spain) F López	6	6
(Italy) R Marcora	3	1
WC	(United States) Em Nava	6^{3}	4
(France) H Grenier	7^{7}	6
(Belgium) M Geerts	3	7^{7}	1
(Portugal) N Borges	6	6^{5}	6
Q	(Ukraine) G Kravchenko	3	2
7	(Spain) M Vilella Martínez	6	6
3	(Germany) O Otte	6	6
(Spain) A Menéndez Maceiras	2	3
(Italy) T Fabbiano	6	3	6
(India) R Ramanathan	4	6	3
(France) K Jacquet	2	6	2^{r}
(Uzbekistan) D Istomin	6	4	3
Q	(Kazakhstan) D Yevseyev	7^{7}	6
5	(Kazakhstan) D Popko	6^{5}	4

Second round
1/WC	(Spain) F López	3	5
(France) H Grenier	6	7
(Portugal) N Borges	3	6	6
7	(Spain) M Vilella Martínez	6	3	1
3	(Germany) O Otte	6	6
(Italy) T Fabbiano	1	4
(Uzbekistan) D Istomin	5	4
Q	(Kazakhstan) D Yevseyev	7	6

Quarterfinals
(France) H Grenier	6	3	6
(Portugal) N Borges	4	6	4
3	(Germany) O Otte	7^{10}	6
Q	(Kazakhstan) D Yevseyev	6^{8}	1

Semifinals
(France) H Grenier	6	6^{3}	6
3	(Germany) O Otte	3	7^{7}	4

=== Bottom half ===
First round
8	(Portugal) J Sousa	6	7^{7}
(Italy) M Viola	1	6^{5}
Q	(India) S Balaji	5	6	6
WC	(Spain) N Álvarez Varona	7	4	4
Alt	(Ukraine) V Orlov	2	1
Alt	(Germany) M Zverev	6	6
(Portugal) F Ferreira Silva	6^{3}	7^{7}	7^{8}
4	(France) Q Halys	7^{7}	6^{4}	6^{6}
6	(Poland) K Żuk	5	7^{7}	6
(Russia) T Gabashvili	7	6^{1}	3
Q	(Argentina) S Rodríguez Taverna	5	3
Alt	(Austria) L Miedler	7	6
(France) C Lestienne	6	7
(Croatia) B Gojo	4	5
(Spain) N Kuhn	4	3
2	(Spain) F Verdasco	6	6

Second round
8	(Portugal) J Sousa	6	3	6
Q	(India) S Balaji	2	6	4
Alt	(Germany) M Zverev	2	0
(Portugal) F Ferreira Silva	6	6
6	(Poland) K Żuk	5	3
Alt	(Austria) L Miedler	7	6
(France) C Lestienne	5	7^{7}	7
2	(Spain) F Verdasco	7	6^{4}	5

Quarterfinals
8	(Portugal) J Sousa	3	6	6
(Portugal) F Ferreira Silva	6	3	4
Alt	(Austria) L Miedler	6^{5}	4
(France) C Lestienne	7^{7}	6

Semifinals
8	(Portugal) J Sousa	4	6^{5}
(France) C Lestienne	6	7^{7}
