= Pepe Vendrell =

Spanish tennis coach

- Full name: José Luis Vendrell Bru
- Country (sports): Spain
- Residence: Castellón de la Plana, Spain
- Born: 21 August 1980 (age 46) Castellón de la Plana, Spain

Coaching career (2011–)
- Roberto Bautista Agut (2011–2021, 2023–2026); Cristian Garín (2022); Nicolás Álvarez Varona (2022–2023)

Coaching achievements
- Coachee singles titles total: 9
- List of notable tournaments (with champion) Davis Cup (Bautista Agut)
- Last updated on: 5 January 2022.

José Luis "Pepe" Vendrell Bru (born 21 August 1980) is a Spanish tennis coach.

== Coaching career ==
He coached countryman Roberto Bautista Agut from 2011 to 2021, helping him capture nine ATP Tour singles titles and reach a career-high ranking of World No. 9. Vendrell was said to be "like a brother, a friend and a psychologist" to Bautista Agut. The two ended their professional relationship on good terms.

In January 2021, Vendrell was appointed as the captain of the Spanish team at the ATP Cup.

In the beginning of 2022, Vendrell worked at the JC Ferrero Equelite Sport Academy, located in Villena, Spain.

From April to September 2022, Vendrell coached Cristian Garín. Under his coaching, Garín reached his maiden Grand Slam quarterfinal at the 2022 Wimbledon Championships.

From late 2022 to early 2023, he served as one of the coaches to Nicolás Álvarez Varona; since mid-2023, he has resumed his role as coach to Bautista Agut.
