= Challenger Club Els Gorchs =

Tennis tournament in Spain

- 2023 Challenger Club Els Gorchs

ATP Challenger Tour
- Event name: Challenger Club Els Gorchs
- Location: Les Franqueses del Vallès, Spain
- Venue: Club Tennis Els Gorchs
- Category: ATP Challenger Tour
- Surface: Hard

The Challenger Club Els Gorchs is a professional tennis tournament played on hard courts. It is currently part of the Association of Tennis Professionals (ATP) Challenger Tour. It was first held in Les Franqueses del Vallès, Spain, in 2023.

== Past finals ==
=== Singles ===
Year	Champion	Runner-up	Score
2023	(France) Hugo Grenier	(United Kingdom) Billy Harris	3–6, 6–1, 7–6^{(7–3)}

=== Doubles ===
Year	Champions	Runners-up	Score
2023	(India) Anirudh Chandrasekar (India) Vijay Sundar Prashanth	(India) Purav Raja (India) Divij Sharan	7–5, 6–1
