= Les Franqueses del Vallès =

- Municipality
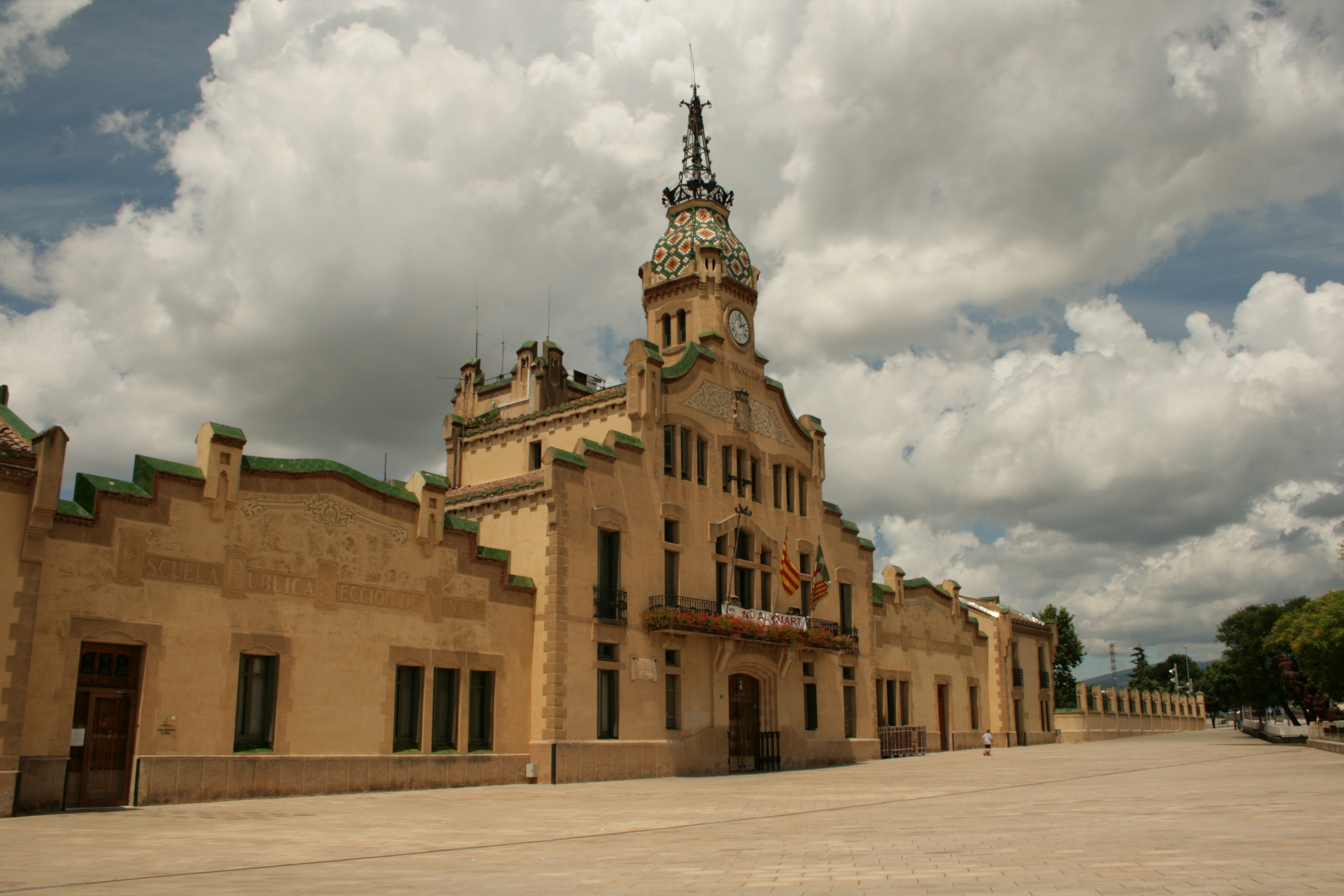
- Town Hall (Ajuntament)

- Flag Coat of arms

- Location in Catalonia Les Franqueses del Vallès (Spain)
- Coordinates: 41.633°N 2.298°E
- Country: Spain
- Community: Catalonia
- Province: Barcelona
- Comarca: Vallès Oriental

Government
  - Mayor: Juan Antonio Corchado Ponce (2023-2027)

Area
  - Total: 29.1 km^{2} (11.2 sq mi)
- Elevation: 232 m (761 ft)

Population (2025-01-01)
  - Total: 20,881
  - Density: 718/km^{2} (1,860/sq mi)
- Demonym(s): Franquesí, franquesina
- Website: lesfranqueses.cat

Les Franqueses del Vallès (Catalan pronunciation: [ləs fɾəŋˈkɛzəz ðəl βəˈʎɛs]; Spanish: Las Franquesas del Vallés [las fɾaŋˈkesas ðel βaˈʎes]) is a municipality in the comarca of the Vallès Oriental in Catalonia, Spain. It lies to the north of Granollers, the capital and largest city in the comarca. The municipality covers an area of 29.1 km^{2}, and has about 20,000 inhabitants.

It is divided into five neighbourhoods: Bellavista, Corró d'Amunt, Corró d'Avall, Llerona and Marata.

== Demography ==
1900	1930	1950	1970	1986	2007
1,888	2,118	2,247	5,539	9,403	16,325
