= Constant Lestienne =

French tennis player

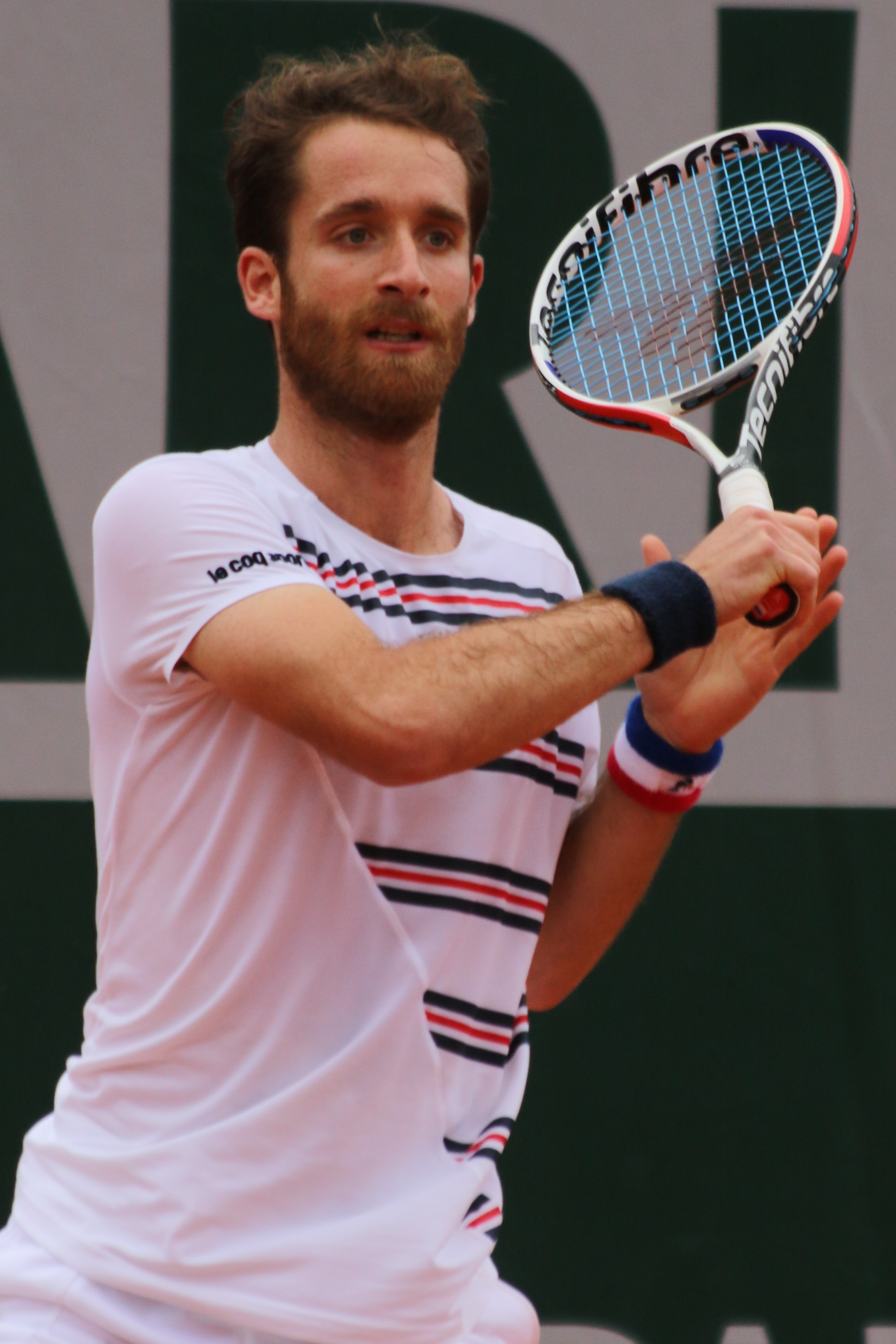
- Lestienne in 2019
- Country (sports): France
- Residence: Paris, France
- Born: 23 May 1992 (age 34) Amiens, France
- Height: 1.80 m (5 ft 11 in)
- Turned pro: 2012
- Retired: June 2025 (last match played)
- Plays: Right-handed (two-handed backhand)
- Prize money: US $2,244,278

Singles
- Career record: 18–43
- Career titles: 0
- Highest ranking: No. 48 (6 February 2023)

Grand Slam singles results
- Australian Open: 2R (2023)
- French Open: 1R (2023, 2024)
- Wimbledon: 1R (2023, 2024)
- US Open: 1R (2023, 2024)

Doubles
- Career record: 6–14
- Career titles: 0
- Highest ranking: No. 250 (12 June 2023)

Grand Slam doubles results
- Australian Open: 1R (2023)
- French Open: 2R (2017)
- Wimbledon: 1R (2023)
- Last updated on: 1 September 2026.

Constant Lestienne (French pronunciation: [kɔ̃stɑ̃ lɛstjɛn]; born 23 May 1992) is a French inactive professional tennis player. He reached his highest ATP singles ranking of world No. 48 on 6 February 2023 and his highest doubles ranking of No. 250 was achieved on 12 June 2023. He has won eight ATP Challenger singles titles. In addition, he has won five singles titles and three doubles titles on the ITF Circuit.

== Career ==
=== 2015-2016: ATP Tour debut, maiden Challenger title ===
Lestienne reached his first career ATP Tour singles main draw at the 2015 Estoril Open after winning two singles qualifying matches. He lost in the first round to Pablo Carreño Busta.

In May 2016, Lestienne won his first ATP Challenger Tour tournament in Ostrava.

=== 2017-2021: Grand Slam debut in doubles ===
He made his Grand Slam main draw debut at the 2017 French Open after receiving a wildcard to the doubles main draw with Corentin Moutet. They defeated Dustin Brown and Lu Yen-hsun in the first round, but were defeated by Jean-Julien Rojer and Horia Tecău in the second round.

He won his third Challenger at the 2021 JC Ferrero Challenger Open in Alicante, Spain and climbed 50 positions in the rankings to world No. 208 on 18 October 2021.

=== 2022: Three Challengers, Top 75, first ATP semifinal ===
On 1 August 2022, Lestienne entered the Top 100 at World No. 90, following two ATP Challenger Tour titles in Spain in July 2022 and two more finals in the same year. He won his third Challenger in Vancouver in August and reached the top 75 in the rankings on 22 August 2022.

In September 2022, Lestienne reached his first quarterfinal on the ATP Tour at the San Diego Open defeating Brandon Holt and sixth seed Alejandro Tabilo. He entered the top 70 in the rankings on 26 September 2022 at world No. 68. Lestienne followed this by reaching his first semifinal at the 2022 Tel Aviv Open defeating seventh seed compatriot Adrian Mannarino, Emil Ruusuvuori and fourth seed Maxime Cressy in the quarterfinal, his first win against a player in the Top 50.

=== 2023: Major & Masters singles debuts, first Major win & top 50 ===
At 30 years old, he made his Grand Slam debut in singles at the 2023 Australian Open and won his first Major match defeating Thiago Monteiro. He reached the top 50 on 6 February 2023 at world No. 48.

In February, Lestienne reached his first ATP Tour doubles final at the Qatar Open, playing along Botic van de Zandschulp losing to Rohan Bopanna and Matthew Ebden in the finals.

He made his Masters debut at the 2023 Indian Wells Masters but retired in the first round against Emil Ruusuvuori. He also made his debut at the Italian Open but also retired after one set in the first round against Laslo Djere. On his debut at the 2023 French Open he lost in the first round to 11th seed Karen Khachanov. Also on his debut at Wimbledon he lost in the first round to Liam Broady.

In August, Lestienne won the title in Stanford, defeating qualifier Emilio Nava in the final, his first Challenger title in a year. In September, Lestienne won another Challenger title in Saint-Tropez, defeating ninth seed Liam Broady in the final, returning in the top 100 on 25 September 2023 as a result. In October, Lestienne reached his 14th Challenger final in Alicante and defeated fellow countryman Hugo Grenier in the final for a second time at this tournament, winning his ninth Challenger.

== Suspension for betting ==
In September 2016, Lestienne was suspended for seven months and fined $10,000 by the International Tennis Federation for betting on tennis matches. The Tennis Integrity Unit (TIU) in cooperation with French online gambling regulator ARJEL found that Lestienne had bet on 220 tennis matches from February 2012 to June 2015. None of these matches were his own. Half of the ban was suspended, and his fine would be cut in half if he assisted the TIU.

== Performance timeline ==
Key
W	F	SF	QF	#R	RR	Q#	DNQ	A	NH

(W) winner; (F) finalist; (SF) semifinalist; (QF) quarterfinalist; (#R) rounds 4, 3, 2, 1; (RR) round-robin stage; (Q#) qualification round; (DNQ) did not qualify; (A) absent; (NH) not held; (SR) strike rate (events won / competed); (W–L) win–loss record.
To avoid confusion and double counting, these charts are updated at the conclusion of a tournament or when the player's participation has ended.

=== Singles ===
Current through the 2025 Wimbledon

Tournament	2013	2014	2015	2016	2017	2018	2019	2020	2021	2022	2023	2024	2025	SR	W–L
Grand Slam tournaments
Australian Open	A	A	A	A	A	A	Q1	Q3	Q3	Q2	2R	1R	Q1	0 / 2	1–2
French Open	A	A	Q1	A	Q1	Q2	Q1	Q2	Q1	Q1	1R	1R	Q1	0 / 2	0–2
Wimbledon	A	A	A	Q1	A	Q2	Q1	NH	Q1	Q2	1R	1R	Q1	0 / 2	0–2
US Open	A	A	A	Q1	A	Q2	Q3	A	Q2	Q2	1R	1R	A	0 / 2	0–2
Win–loss	0-0	0-0	0-0	0–0	0–0	0–0	0–0	0–0	0–0	0–0	1–4	0–4	0–0	0 / 8	1–8
ATP Masters 1000
Indian Wells Masters	A	A	A	A	A	A	A	NH	A	A	1R	2R	Q1	0 / 2	1–2
Miami Open	A	A	A	A	A	A	A	NH	A	A	A	A	A	0 / 0	0–0
Monte-Carlo Masters	A	A	A	A	A	A	A	NH	A	A	Q1	A	A	0 / 0	0–0
Madrid Open	A	A	A	A	A	A	A	NH	A	A	A	A	A	0 / 0	0–0
Italian Open	A	A	A	A	A	A	A	A	A	A	1R	A	A	0 / 1	0–1
Canadian Open	A	A	A	A	A	A	A	NH	A	A	Q2	A	A	0 / 0	0–0
Cincinnati Masters	A	A	A	A	A	A	A	A	A	A	A	A	A	0 / 0	0–0
Shanghai Masters	A	A	A	A	A	A	A	NH			A	A	A	0 / 0	0–0
Paris Masters	Q1	A	A	A	A	Q1	A	A	A	Q1	A	A	A	0 / 0	0–0
Win–loss	0–0	0–0	0–0	0–0	0–0	0–0	0–0	0–0	0–0	0–0	0–2	1–1	0–0	0 / 3	1–3
Career statistics
	2013	2014	2015	2016	2017	2018	2019	2020	2021	2022	2023	2024	2025	Career	
Tournaments	0	0	1	0	0	2	2	0	1	4	19	12	2	43	
Titles	0	0	0	0	0	0	0	0	0	0	0	0	0	0	
Finals	0	0	0	0	0	0	0	0	0	0	0	0	0	0	
Overall win–loss	0–0	0–0	0–1	0–0	0–0	1–2	0–2	0–0	0–1	7–4	6–19	3–12	1–2	18–43	
Year-end ranking	459	456	289	165	316	151	204	225	228	65	87	189	318	30%	

== ATP career finals ==
=== Doubles: 1 (1 runner up) ===
Legend Grand Slam tournaments (0–0) ATP Tour Masters 1000 (0–0) ATP Tour 500 Series (0–0) ATP Tour 250 Series (0–1)	Finals by surface Hard (0–1) Clay (0–0) Grass (0–0)

Result	W–L	Date	Tournament	Tier	Surface	Partner	Opponents	Score
Loss	0–1	Feb 2023	Qatar Open, Qatar	250 Series	Hard	(Netherlands) Botic van de Zandschulp	(India) Rohan Bopanna (Australia) Matthew Ebden	7–6^{(7–5)}, 4–6, [6–10]

== ATP Challenger and ITF Tour finals ==
=== Singles: 28 (14–14) ===
Legend (singles) ATP Challenger Tour (9–5) ITF Futures Tour (5–9)	Titles by surface Hard (10–6) Clay (4–8) Grass (0–0) Carpet (0–0)

Result	W–L	Date	Tournament	Tier	Surface	Opponent	Score
Loss	0-1	Feb 2013	France F3, Feucherolles	Futures	Hard (i)	(France) David Guez	0–6, 1–6
Loss	0-2	Aug 2013	Belgium F8, Eupen	Futures	Clay	(North Macedonia) Dimitar Grabul	6–0, 1–6, 3–6
Loss	0-3	Sep 2013	Germany F16, Kenn, Germany	Futures	Clay	(Germany) Yannick Maden	4–6, 6–4, 3–6
Loss	0-4	Jun 2014	France F12, Toulon	Futures	Clay	(France) Enzo Couacaud	4–6, 2–6
Win	1-4	Aug 2014	Belgium F9, Ostend	Futures	Clay	(France) Alexandre Sidorenko	6–4, 6–2
Loss	1-5	Mar 2015	France F7, Saint-Raphaël	Futures	Hard (i)	(France) Yanais Laurent	2–6, 2–6
Win	2-5	Aug 2015	Netherlands F6, Rotterdam	Futures	Clay	(Russia) Alexey Vatutin	6–0, 6–4
Loss	2-6	Jan 2016	France F1, Bagnoles-de-l'Orne	Futures	Clay (i)	(Belgium) Yannik Reuter	3–6, 2–6
Win	3-6	Jan 2016	France F2, Bressuire	Futures	Hard (i)	(France) Hugo Nys	6–7^{(4–7)}, 6–1, 6–4
Win	4-6	May 2016	Ostrava, Czech Republic	Challenger	Clay	(Czech Republic) Zdeněk Kolář	6–7^{(5–7)}, 6–1, 6–2
Loss	4-7	Jul 2016	France F12, Montauban	Futures	Clay	(Spain) Jordi Samper Montaña	6–7^{(6–8)}, 7–6^{(8–6)}, 2–6
Loss	4-8	Jul 2016	San Benedetto del Tronto, Italy	Challenger	Clay	(Italy) Federico Gaio	2–6, 6–1, 3–6
Loss	4-9	Jan 2017	France F1, Bagnoles-de-l'Orne	Futures	Clay (i)	(France) Maxime Hamou	6–3, 4–6, 3–6
Win	5-9	Jun 2017	Hungary F4, Gyula	Futures	Clay	(Argentina) Facundo Mena	7–5, 6–4
Loss	5-10	Jul 2017	France F14, Bourg-en-Bresse	Futures	Clay	(France) Geoffrey Blancaneaux	6–3, 2–6, 5–7
Winner	6-10	Dec 2017	Czech Republic F12, Prague	Futures	Hard (i)	(Czech Republic) Petr Michnev	6–3, 6–3
Loss	6-11	Feb 2018	Cherbourg, France	Challenger	Hard (i)	(Germany) Maximilian Marterer	4–6, 5–7
Loss	6-12	Apr 2018	Saint-Brieuc, France	Challenger	Hard (i)	(Lithuania) Ričardas Berankis	2–6, 7–5, 4–6
Win	7-12	Aug 2018	Portorož, Slovenia	Challenger	Hard	(Italy) Andrea Arnaboldi	6–2, 6–1
Win	8-12	Oct 2021	Alicante, Spain	Challenger	Hard	(France) Hugo Grenier	6–4, 6–3
Loss	8-13	Feb 2022	Cherbourg, France	Challenger	Hard (i)	(France) Benjamin Bonzi	6–4, 2–6, 6–4
Win	9-13	Jul 2022	Malaga, Spain	Challenger	Hard	(Ecuador) Emilio Gomez	6–3, 5–7, 6–2
Win	10-13	Jul 2022	Pozoblanco, Spain	Challenger	Hard	(France) Grégoire Barrère	6–0, 7–6 ^{(7–3)}
Loss	10-14	Jul 2022	Segovia, Spain	Challenger	Hard	(France) Hugo Grenier	5–7, 3–6
Win	11-14	Aug 2022	Vancouver, Canada	Challenger	Hard	(France) Arthur Rinderknech	6–0, 4–6, 6–3
Win	12-14	Aug 2023	Stanford, United States	Challenger	Hard	(United States) Emilio Nava	7–6^{(7–4)}, 6–2
Win	13-14	Sep 2023	Saint-Tropez, France	Challenger	Hard	(United Kingdom) Liam Broady	4–6, 6–3, 6–4
Win	14–14	Oct 2023	Alicante, Spain	Challenger	Hard	(France) Hugo Grenier	6–7^{(10–12)}, 6–2, 6–4

=== Doubles (3–3) ===
Legend
ATP Challenger Tour (0–0)
ITF Men's Circuit (3–3)

Outcome	No.	Date	Tournament	Surface	Partner	Opponent	Score
Winner	1.	29 June 2014	Toulon, France	Clay	(France) Yanais Laurent	(Argentina) Federico Coria (Argentina) Dante Gennaro	3–6, 6–3, [10–4]
Winner	2.	6 July 2014	Montauban, France	Clay	(France) Yanais Laurent	(France) Remy Chala (France) Valentin Masse	6–1, 6–3
Runner-up	3.	8 March 2015	Lille, France	Hard (i)	(France) Jonathan Eysseric	(Belgium) Yannick Mertens (Netherlands) Boy Westerhof	4–6, 4–6
Runner-up	4.	22 March 2015	Poitiers, France	Hard (i)	(France) Grégoire Jacq	(France) Grégoire Burquier (France) Alexandre Sidorenko	4–6, 2–6
Runner-up	5.	5 July 2015	Montauban, France	Clay	(France) Yanais Laurent	(France) Tristan Lamasine (France) Maxime Teixeira	4–6, 4–6
Winner	6.	15 January 2017	Bagnoles-de-l'Orne, France	Clay (i)	(France) Alexis Musialek	(France) Grégoire Jacq (France) Hugo Nys	3–6, 7–5, [10–8]
