= Hugo Grenier =

French tennis player

- Grenier at the 2026 Wimbledon Championships
- Country (sports): France
- Residence: Montbrison, France
- Born: 23 March 1996 (age 30) Montbrison, France
- Height: 1.96 m (6 ft 5 in)
- Turned pro: 2013
- Plays: Right-handed (two-handed backhand)
- Coach: Gerard Solves
- Prize money: US $1,859,704

Singles
- Career record: 9–19 (at ATP Tour level, Grand Slam level, and in Davis Cup)
- Career titles: 0
- Highest ranking: No. 95 (12 September 2022)
- Current ranking: No. 418 (9 November 2026)

Grand Slam singles results
- Australian Open: 2R (2024)
- French Open: 1R (2023)
- Wimbledon: 2R (2022)
- US Open: 2R (2022)

Doubles
- Career record: 0–1 (at ATP Tour level, Grand Slam level, and in Davis Cup)
- Career titles: 0
- Highest ranking: No. 362 (21 February 2022)
- Current ranking: No. 1,220 (9 November 2026)
- Last updated on: 9 November 2026.

Hugo Grenier (born 23 March 1996) is a French professional tennis player. Grenier has a career high ATP singles ranking of world No. 95 achieved on 12 September 2022. He also has a career high ATP doubles ranking of No. 362 achieved on 21 February 2022. Grenier has won five Challenger singles titles. He has also won six singles titles and three doubles titles on the ITF Futures Tour.

== Career ==
=== 2021: ATP and top 150 debuts, maiden Challenger title ===
In January, Grenier made his ATP Tour main draw debut at the 2021 Antalya Open, where he defeated Slovak qualifier Alex Molčan in the first round in straight sets before losing to fifth seed German Jan-Lennard Struff by walkover in the second round.

In November, Grenier won his first career ATP Challenger Tour singles title in Roanne, France.

=== 2022: Major & top 100 debuts ===
He entered the main draw as a lucky loser at the 2022 Barcelona Open Banc Sabadell.

He made his Grand Slam singles main draw debut also as a lucky loser at the 2022 Wimbledon Championships where he earned his first career Grand Slam singles main draw match win and just his second career ATP Tour singles main draw match win by defeating fellow first-time qualifier Marc-Andrea Hüsler in five sets in a close-to-4-hours first round match. He lost to the unseeded Cristian Garín in straight sets in the second round. Later in the month of July, he won his second career ATP Challenger Tour singles title at the 2022 Open Castilla y León dropping one set the whole week.

In August, he made his US Open singles main draw debut, entering the main draw as a lucky loser. There, he beat Tomás Martín Etcheverry in the first round and lost to the 13th seed Matteo Berrettini in the second round. Grenier broke into the top 100 of the ATP singles rankings at world No. 95 on 12 September 2022, after winning the Cassis Open Provence singles title, defeating James Duckworth in the final.

=== 2023: Masters debut and first clay-court wins, out of top 150 ===
In March, Grenier won his fourth career Challenger singles title in Les Franqueses del Vallès, Spain. Grenier made his ATP Tour singles main draw clay-court debut at the 2023 Grand Prix Hassan II. There, he was defeated in the final qualifying round by Dimitar Kuzmanov but entered the main draw as a lucky loser, where coincidentally he lost again to Kuzmanov in the first round.

Ranked No. 128 in the world, Grenier made his Masters 1000 singles main draw debut at the 2023 Mutua Madrid Open by winning two qualifying matches. In the main draw, he earned his first career ATP Tour singles main draw clay-court match win by defeating former top 10 player Diego Schwartzman in straight sets in the first round. In the second round, he recorded his first career top 30 win by defeating 22nd seed Sebastian Korda in a straight-sets match with two tiebreaks. In the third round, he lost to 13th seed Alexander Zverev in straight sets 1–6, 0–6 in a 56-minute match. Ranked No. 124, he entered the next Masters 1000 in Rome as a lucky loser but lost to J. J. Wolf in the first round.

Grenier made his French Open singles main draw debut thanks to a wildcard, where he lost in the first round to the unseeded Márton Fucsovics in four sets.

In July, Grenier won his fifth career Challenger singles title in Pozablanco, Spain, defeating Juan Pablo Ficovich in the final. In October, Grenier reached the final in Alicante, Spain, where he lost to fellow countryman Constant Lestienne in the final for the second time at this tournament, the first time being in 2021.

Grenier finished the season outside the top 150 ranked at world No. 177.

=== 2024: Australian Open debut and first win ===
Ranked No. 178, Grenier qualified for the 2024 Australian Open defeating compatriot Giovanni Mpetshi Perricard making his debut at this Major and recorded his first ever win at the tournament over another Frenchman Alexandre Müller.

He qualified for the 2024 Open 13 Provence but lost to Sebastian Korda. Next he also qualified for the 2024 Qatar ExxonMobil Open and defeated lucky loser Maximilian Marterer.

In March, Grenier qualified to the Indian Wells Masters, his third career Masters appearance.

In April, ranked No. 156, he also entered the main draw of the ATP 500, the 2024 Barcelona Open Banc Sabadell as a lucky loser for a second time at this tournament, after the late withdrawal of defending champion and top seed Carlos Alcaraz.

Ranked No. 173, he qualified for the 2024 US Open making his second appearance at this Major, losing to fellow qualifier Mitchell Krueger in the first round.

=== 2025: Back to top 200, Challenger final in two years ===
In October, Grenier reached his first Challenger final in two years at the Villena Open, losing to third seed Pablo Carreño Busta in the final.

== Performance timeline ==
Key
W	F	SF	QF	#R	RR	Q#	P#	DNQ	A	Z#	PO	G	S	B	NMS	NTI	P	NH

(W) winner; (F) finalist; (SF) semifinalist; (QF) quarterfinalist; (#R) rounds 4, 3, 2, 1; (RR) round-robin stage; (Q#) qualification round; (DNQ) did not qualify; (A) absent; (NH) not held; (SR) strike rate (events won / competed); (W–L) win–loss record.
To avoid confusion and double counting, these charts are updated at the conclusion of a tournament or when the player's participation has ended.

Current through the 2025 Wimbledon.

Grand Slam tournaments	2018	2019	2020	2021	2022	2023	2024	2025	2026	SR	W–L	Win%
Australian Open	A	A	A	A	Q1	Q1	2R	Q1	Q2	0 / 1	1–1	50%
French Open	Q1	A	Q2	A	Q1	1R	Q2	Q1	Q1	0 / 1	0–1	0%
Wimbledon	A	A	NH	A	2R	Q1	Q3	Q1	Q1	0 / 1	1–1	50%
US Open	A	A	A	Q1	2R	Q1	1R	Q3		0 / 2	1–2	33%
Win–loss	0–0	0–0	0–0	0–0	2–2	0–1	1–2	0–0	0–0	0 / 5	3–5	38%
ATP Masters 1000
Indian Wells Masters	A	A	NH	A	Q1	A	1R	A		0 / 1	0–1	0%
Miami Open	A	A	NH	A	Q2	A	Q2	A		0 / 0	0–0	–
Monte-Carlo Masters	A	A	NH	A	A	A	A	A		0 / 0	0–0	–
Madrid Open	A	A	NH	A	A	3R	A	A		0 / 1	2–1	67%
Italian Open	A	A	A	A	A	1R	A	A		0 / 1	0–1	0%
Canadian Open	A	A	NH	A	A	A	A	A		0 / 0	0–0	–
Cincinnati Masters	A	A	A	A	A	A	A	A		0 / 0	0–0	–
Shanghai Masters	A	A	NH			A	A	A		0 / 0	0–0	–
Paris Masters	A	A	A	A	Q1	A	A	A		0 / 0	0–0	–
Win–loss	0–0	0–0	0–0	0–0	0–0	2–2	0–1	0–0	0–0	0 / 3	2–3	40%

== ATP Challenger and ITF Tour finals ==
=== Singles: 23 (11 titles, 12 runner-ups) ===
Legend (singles) ATP Challenger Tour (5–3) ITF Futures Tour/ITF World Tennis Tour (6–9)	Titles by surface Hard (10–12) Clay (0–0) Grass (0–0) Carpet (1–0)

Result	W–L	Date	Tournament	Tier	Surface	Opponent	Score
Loss	0–1	Jul 2015	Kuwait F1, Mishref	Futures	Hard	(Netherlands) Lennert Van der Linden	4–6, 6–7^{(1–7)}
Loss	0–2	Mar 2016	Italy F2, Basiglio	Futures	Hard (i)	(Netherlands) Antal Van der Duim	6–7^{(2–7)}, 2–6
Loss	0–3	Jul 2016	Portugal F8, Idanha-a-Nova	Futures	Hard	(Portugal) Joao Monteiro	3–6, 2–6
Loss	0–4	Aug 2016	Italy F26, Piombino	Futures	Hard	(Italy) Matteo Trevisan	5–7, 4–6
Win	1–4	Jan 2017	France F3, Veigy-Foncenex	Futures	Carpet (i)	(Belgium) Clement Geens	6–3, 6–4
Loss	1–5	Feb 2017	Great Britain F1, Glasgow	Futures	Hard (i)	(Slovakia) Filip Horansky	2–6, 3–6
Loss	1–6	Jul 2017	Israel F12, Tel Aviv	Futures	Hard	(France) Antoine Escoffier	7–6^{(7–4)}, 4–6, 2–4 Ret.
Loss	1–7	Aug 2017	Belarus F3, Minsk	Futures	Hard	(Belarus) Dzmitry Zhyrmont	6–7^{(4–7)}, 2–6
Loss	1–8	Jul 2018	Spain F17, Bakio	Futures	Hard	(Spain) Roberto Ortega Olmedo	2–6, 0–3 Ret.
Win	2–8	Mar 2019	M15 Toulouse, France	World Tennis Tour	Hard (i)	(Switzerland) Raphael Baltensperger	4–6, 6–3, 6–4
Win	3–8	Apr 2019	M15 Cancún, Mexico	World Tennis Tour	Hard	(Italy) Lorenzo Frigerio	2–6, 7–6^{(7–3)}, 6–2
Win	4–8	Apr 2019	M15 Cancún, Mexico	World Tennis Tour	Hard	(United States) Gage Brymer	6–3, 6–2
Loss	4–9	Jul 2019	M25 Bakio, Spain	World Tennis Tour	Hard	(France) Laurent Lokoli	3–6, 3–6
Win	5–9	Nov 2019	M25 Saint-Dizier, France	World Tennis Tour	Hard (i)	(France) Harold Mayot	6–1, 7–5
Win	6–9	Jul 2021	M25 Bakio, Spain	World Tennis Tour	Hard	(Spain) Adrián Menéndez Maceiras	6–0, 6–1
Loss	6–10	Oct 2021	Villena, Spain	Challenger	Hard	(France) Constant Lestienne	4–6, 3–6
Win	7–10	Nov 2021	Roanne, France	Challenger	Hard	(Japan) Hiroki Moriya	6–2, 6–3
Win	8–10	Jul 2022	Segovia, Spain	Challenger	Hard	(France) Constant Lestienne	7–5, 6–3
Win	9–10	Sep 2022	Cassis, France	Challenger	Hard	(Australia) James Duckworth	7–5, 6–4
Win	10–10	Mar 2023	Les Franqueses del Vallès, Spain	Challenger	Hard	(United Kingdom) Billy Harris	3–6, 6–1, 7–6^{(7–3)}
Win	11–10	Jul 2023	Pozoblanco, Spain	Challenger	Hard	(Argentina) Juan Pablo Ficovich	6–7^{(4–7)}, 6–2, 7–6^{(7–3)}
Loss	11–11	Oct 2023	Villena, Spain	Challenger	Hard	(France) Constant Lestienne	7–6(12–10), 2–6, 4–6
Loss	11–12	Sep 2025	Villena, Spain	Challenger	Hard	(Spain) Pablo Carreño Busta	6–4, 1–6, 4–6
