= Ferrero Challenger =

- 2026 Ferrero Challenger

ATP Challenger Tour
- Event name: Ferrero & Forty Challenger (2026-), Villena Open (2024-2025), Alicante Ferrero Challenger (-2023)
- Location: Villena, Province of Alicante, Spain
- Venue: Ferrero Tennis Academy
- Category: ATP Challenger Tour
- Surface: Clay (2018-2022); Hard (2023-)
- Draw: 32S/32Q/16D
- Prize money: €145,250 (2025), €43,000 (2018)
- Website: Website

The Ferrero & Forty Challenger is a professional tennis tournament played on hardcourts. It is currently part of the ATP Challenger Tour. It is held annually in Villena, Spain since 2018.

== Past finals ==
=== Singles ===
Year	Champion	Runner-up	Score
2026	(Serbia) Laslo Djere	(Estonia) Daniil Glinka	6–4, 6–4
2025	(Spain) Pablo Carreño Busta	(France) Hugo Grenier	4–6, 6–1, 6–4
2024	(Poland) Kamil Majchrzak	(United States) Nicolas Moreno de Alboran	6–4, 6–2
2023	(France) Constant Lestienne	(France) Hugo Grenier	6–7^{(10–12)}, 6–2, 6–4
2022	(Slovakia) Lukáš Klein	(Dominican Republic) Nick Hardt	6–3, 6–4
2021	(France) Constant Lestienne	(France) Hugo Grenier	6–4, 6–3
2020	(Spain) Carlos Alcaraz	(Spain) Pedro Martínez	7–6^{(8–6)}, 6–3
2019	(Spain) Pablo Andújar (2)	(Spain) Pedro Martínez	6–3, 3–6, 6–3
2018	(Spain) Pablo Andújar	(Australia) Alex de Minaur	7–6^{(7–5)}, 6–1

=== Doubles ===
Year	Champions	Runners-up	Score
2026	(United States) Benjamin Kittay (Japan) Takeru Yuzuki	(Israel) Daniel Cukierman (Brazil) Fernando Romboli	6–4, 5–7, [10–7]
2025	(Belgium) Sander Gillé (Netherlands) Sem Verbeek	(Czech Republic) Petr Nouza (Czech Republic) Patrik Rikl	6–3, 6–4
2024	(India) Anirudh Chandrasekar (India) Niki Kaliyanda Poonacha	(Monaco) Romain Arneodo (Spain) Íñigo Cervantes	7–6^{(7–2)}, 6–4
2023	(India) Niki Kaliyanda Poonacha (India) Divij Sharan	(India) Jeevan Nedunchezhiyan (Australia) John-Patrick Smith	6–4, 3–6, [10–7]
2022	(Netherlands) Robin Haase (France) Albano Olivetti	(Uzbekistan) Sanjar Fayziev (Uzbekistan) Sergey Fomin	7–6^{(7–5)}, 7–5
2021	(Ukraine) Denys Molchanov (Spain) David Vega Hernández	(Monaco) Romain Arneodo (Australia) Matt Reid	6–4, 6–2
2020	(France) Enzo Couacaud (France) Albano Olivetti	(Spain) Íñigo Cervantes (Spain) Oriol Roca Batalla	4–6, 6–4, [10–2]
2019	(Brazil) Thomaz Bellucci (Argentina) Guillermo Durán	(Spain) Gerard Granollers (Spain) Pedro Martínez	2–6, 7–5, [10–5]
2018	(Netherlands) Wesley Koolhof (New Zealand) Artem Sitak	(Argentina) Guido Andreozzi (Uruguay) Ariel Behar	6–3, 6–2
