= Ferrero Tennis Academy =

Tennis club and academy in Villena, Alicante, Spain

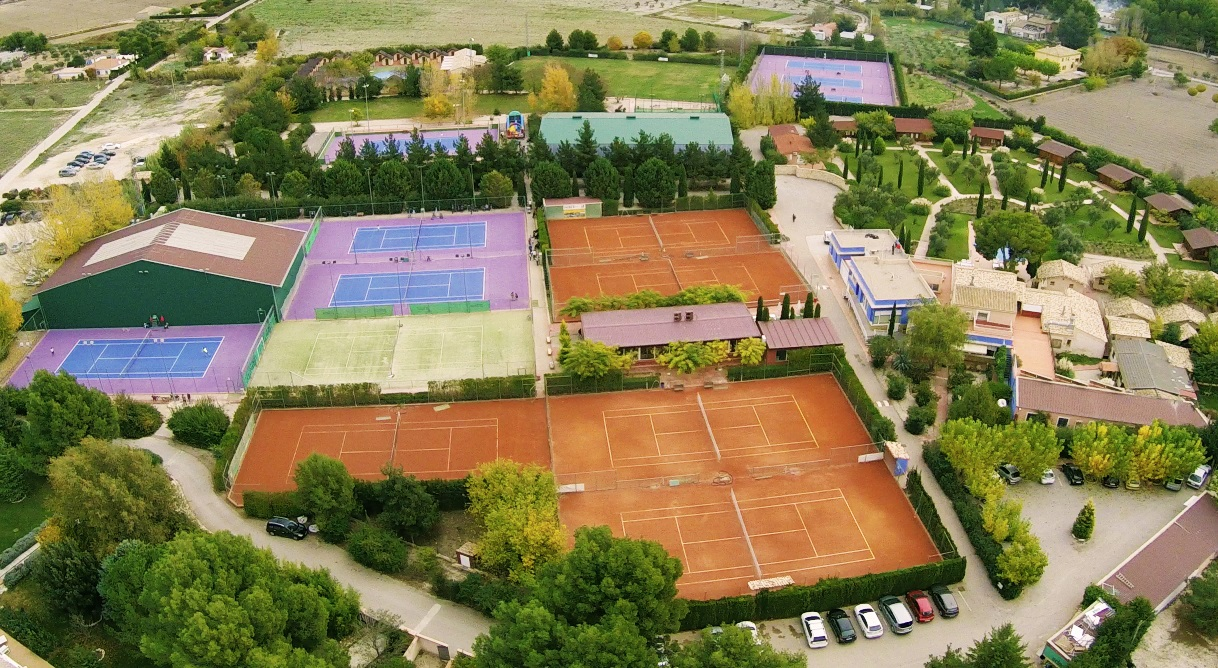
- Aerial view of the Ferrero Tennis Academy
- Formation: 1990; 36 years ago
- Founder: Antonio Martínez Cascales
- Purpose: Sport
- Location: Villena, Alicante, Spain
- Coordinates: 38.6677°N 0.9060°W
- Director: Juan Carlos Ferrero
- Website: ferreroacademy.com

The Ferrero Tennis Academy is a tennis academy and training center in Villena, Alicante, Spain. It hosts the Villena Open on the ATP Challenger Tour.

== History ==
The academy was founded in 1990 by Antonio Martínez Cascales, the future coach of Juan Carlos Ferrero. Originally named the Equelite Academy, its name was later changed to the JC Ferrero Equelite Academy in honor of Ferrero, and shortened to the Ferrero Tennis Academy for simplification purposes. It currently houses 20 courts.

In 2018, the academy held the inaugural JC Ferrero Challenger Open, the first Challenger tournament to be held in Alicante since 1996. In July 2020, during the COVID-19 pandemic, the academy held an exhibition tournament featuring Pablo Carreño Busta, Alex de Minaur, João Sousa, Alejandro Davidovich Fokina, and 17-year-old Carlos Alcaraz. In 2023, its center court was named after Alcaraz, a longtime student of Ferrero and the academy.

== Notable people ==
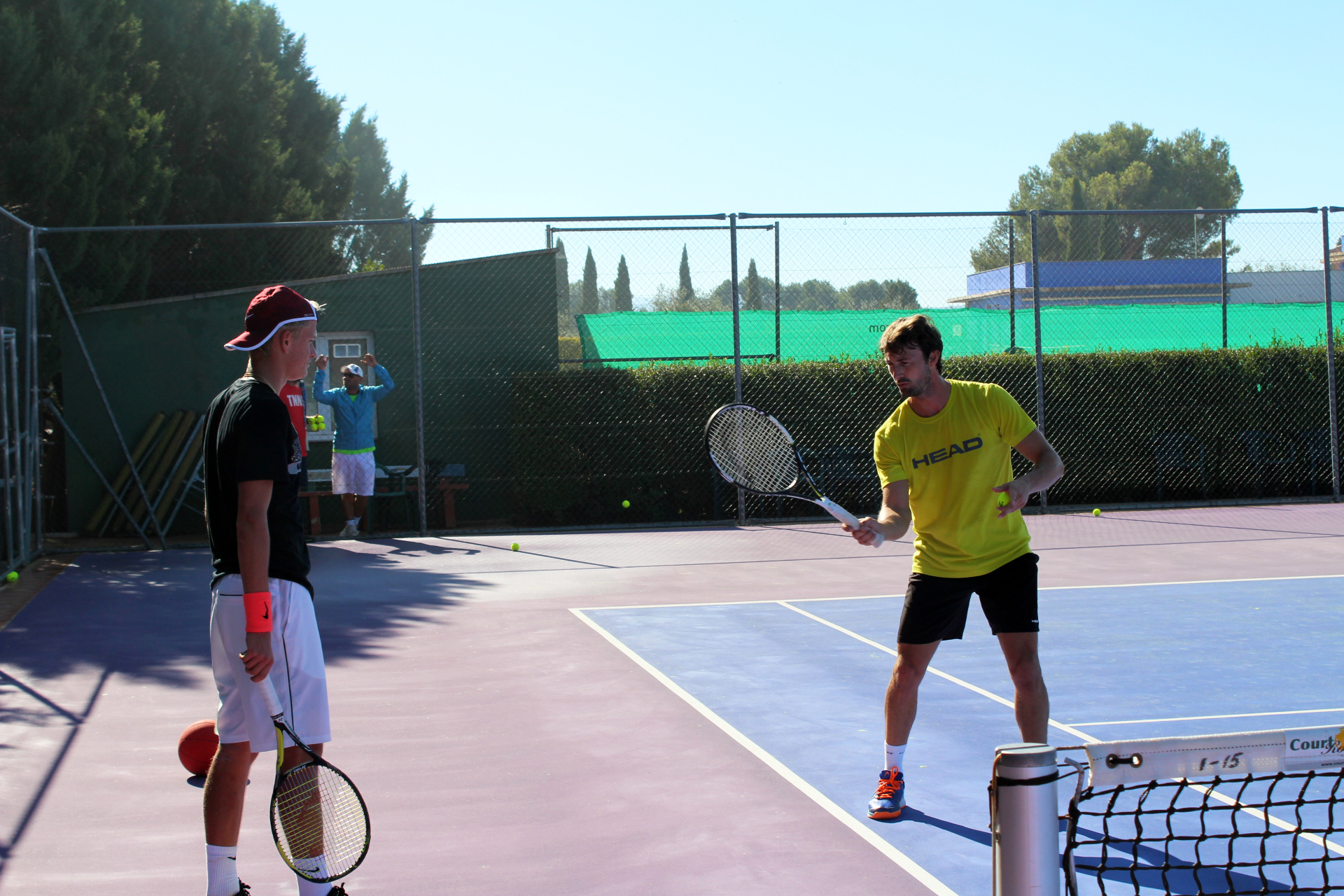
Nicola Kuhn (left) and Juan Carlos Ferrero (right) at the Ferrero Tennis Academy in 2015

=== Players ===
- Carlos Alcaraz
- Nicolás Almagro
- Darwin Blanch
- Ulises Blanch
- Pablo Carreño Busta
- David Ferrer
- Mariusz Fyrstenberg
- Carlos Gimeno Valero
- Nicola Kuhn
- Alejandro Manzanera Pertusa
- María José Martínez Sánchez
- Emilio Nava
- Santiago Ventura Bertomeu
- María Teresa Torró Flor
- Mario Vilella Martínez
- James Ward
- Bu Yunchaokete

=== Coaches ===
- Juan Carlos Ferrero
- Samuel López
- Pepe Vendrell
