= 2023 Challenger Santa Fe II – Singles =

Singles
- 2023 Challenger Santa Fe II

Final
- Champion: (Argentina) Mariano Navone
- Runner-up: (Italy) Andrea Pellegrino
- Score: 3–6, 6–2, 6–3

Events
Singles	Doubles
← 2023 ·	Challenger Santa Fe	· 2024 →

Mariano Navone was the defending champion and successfully defended his title after defeating Andrea Pellegrino 3–6, 6–2, 6–3 in the final.

== Seeds ==
1. (Argentina) Federico Coria (quarterfinals, retired)
2. (Argentina) Juan Manuel Cerúndolo (first round)
3. (Chile) Tomás Barrios Vera (quarterfinals)
4. (Czech Republic) Vít Kopřiva (semifinals)
5. (Argentina) Francisco Comesaña (second round)
6. (United Kingdom) Jan Choinski (first round, retired)
7. (Argentina) Genaro Alberto Olivieri (first round, retired)
8. (Brazil) Felipe Meligeni Alves (second round)

== Draw ==
=== Key ===
- Q = Qualifier
- WC = Wild card
- LL = Lucky loser
- Alt = Alternate
- ITF = ITF entry
- PR = Protected ranking
- SR = Special ranking
- SE = Special exempt
- JE = Junior exempt
- JR = Junior Accelerator Programme entrant
- CO = College Accelerator Programme entrant
- NG = Next Gen Accelerator Program entrant
- w/o = Walkover
- r = Retired
- d = Defaulted

=== Finals ===
Semifinals
(Italy) Andrea Pellegrino	6	6
4	(Czech Republic) Vít Kopřiva	1	3
(Argentina) Mariano Navone	7	6
(Brazil) Thiago Monteiro	5	4

Final
(Italy) Andrea Pellegrino	6	2	3
(Argentina) Mariano Navone	3	6	6

=== Top half ===
First round
1	(Argentina) F Coria	6	7
Q	(Colombia) N Mejía	4	5
(Italy) F Agamenone	3	4
(Slovakia) J Kovalík	6	6
Alt	(Argentina) M Trungelliti	6	6
(Argentina) A Collarini	3	4
(Italy) A Pellegrino	6	3
6	(United Kingdom) J Choinski	4	0^{r}
4	(Czech Republic) V Kopřiva	6	0	6
Q	(Paraguay) AD Vallejo	0	6	3
(Peru) G Bueno	6	3	0
WC	(Argentina) RA Burruchaga	4	6	6
Q	(Jamaica) B Bicknell	2	2
WC	(Argentina) F Delbonis	6	6
(Austria) L Neumayer	5	1
8	(Brazil) F Meligeni Alves	7	6

Second round
1	(Argentina) F Coria	4	7^{7}	7^{7}
(Slovakia) J Kovalík	6	6^{5}	6^{2}
Alt	(Argentina) M Trungelliti	1	6	4
(Italy) A Pellegrino	6	2	6
4	(Czech Republic) V Kopřiva	6	6
WC	(Argentina) RA Burruchaga	3	0
WC	(Argentina) F Delbonis	6	6
8	(Brazil) F Meligeni Alves	1	3

Quarterfinals
1	(Argentina) F Coria	0	2^{r}
(Italy) A Pellegrino	6	3
4	(Czech Republic) V Kopřiva	6	6
WC	(Argentina) F Delbonis	4	3

Semifinals
(Italy) A Pellegrino	6	6
4	(Czech Republic) V Kopřiva	1	3

=== Bottom half ===
First round
5	(Argentina) F Comesaña	6	6
(Italy) R Bonadio	4	2
(Argentina) M Navone	6^{7}	6	6
Q	(Argentina) A Barrena	7^{9}	2	2
WC	(Argentina) JB Torres	1	0^{r}
(Italy) L Darderi	6	4
(Argentina) G Andreozzi	6^{3}	2
3	(Chile) T Barrios Vera	7^{7}	6
7	(Argentina) GA Olivieri	5	0^{r}
(Argentina) F Bagnis	7	2
LL	(Argentina) JP Ficovich	3	2
(Czech Republic) D Svrčina	6	6
Q	(Spain) C Taberner	6	7
Q	(Brazil) P Boscardin Dias	4	5
(Brazil) T Monteiro	6	2	7^{7}
2	(Argentina) JM Cerúndolo	3	6	6^{4}

Second round
5	(Argentina) F Comesaña	3	6	4
(Argentina) M Navone	6	3	6
(Italy) L Darderi	4	6	6^{3}
3	(Chile) T Barrios Vera	6	4	7^{7}
(Argentina) F Bagnis	6	6
(Czech Republic) D Svrčina	3	4
Q	(Spain) C Taberner	4	6	1
(Brazil) T Monteiro	6	4	6

Quarterfinals
(Argentina) M Navone	7^{7}	6
3	(Chile) T Barrios Vera	6^{2}	4
(Argentina) F Bagnis	2	0
(Brazil) T Monteiro	6	6

Semifinals
(Argentina) M Navone	7	6
(Brazil) T Monteiro	5	4
