= 2024 Challenger Santa Fe =

- Date: 3 – 9 June
- Edition: 3rd
- Surface: Clay
- Location: Santa Fe, Argentina

Champions

Singles
- (Argentina) Andrea Collarini

Doubles
- (Lebanon) Hady Habib / (United States) Trey Hilderbrand
← 2023 ·	Challenger Santa Fe	· 2025 →

The 2024 Challenger Santa Fe, known as AAT Challenger Santander edición Santa Fe, was a professional tennis tournament played on clay courts. It was the third edition of the tournament which was part of the 2024 ATP Challenger Tour. It took place in Santa Fe, Argentina between 3 and 9 June 2024.

== Singles main-draw entrants ==
=== Seeds ===
Country	Player	Rank^{1}	Seed
BOL	Hugo Dellien	168	1
BOL	Murkel Dellien	222	2
ARG	Santiago Rodríguez Taverna	245	3
LIB	Hady Habib	259	4
PER	Gonzalo Bueno	276	5
ECU	Álvaro Guillén Meza	279	6
ARG	Andrea Collarini	292	7
BRA	Pedro Sakamoto	302	8

- ^{1} Rankings are as of 27 May 2024.

=== Other entrants ===
The following players received wildcards into the singles main draw:

- (Argentina) Juan Estévez
- (Argentina) Alejo Lorenzo Lingua Lavallén
- (Argentina) Ezequiel Monferrer

The following player received entry into the singles main draw using a protected ranking:

- (Peru) Nicolás Álvarez

The following players received entry into the singles main draw as alternates:

- (Spain) Diego Augusto Barreto Sánchez
- (Brazil) Wilson Leite

The following players received entry from the qualifying draw:

- (Argentina) Leonardo Aboian
- (United States) Dali Blanch
- (Argentina) Tomás Farjat
- (Ecuador) Emilio Gómez
- (United States) Trey Hilderbrand
- Aleksandr Lobanov

== Champions ==
=== Singles ===
- (Argentina) Andrea Collarini def. (Argentina) Facundo Mena 6–2, 6–3.

=== Doubles ===
- (Lebanon) Hady Habib / (United States) Trey Hilderbrand def. (Uruguay) Ignacio Carou / (Argentina) Facundo Mena 6–7^{(5–7)}, 6–2, [10–4].
