= 2024 Challenger Santa Fe – Doubles =

Doubles
- 2024 Challenger Santa Fe

Final
- Champions: (Lebanon) Hady Habib (United States) Trey Hilderbrand
- Runners-up: (Uruguay) Ignacio Carou (Argentina) Facundo Mena
- Score: 6–7^{(5–7)}, 6–2, [10–4]

Events
Singles	Doubles
- Challenger Santa Fe

Luca Margaroli and Santiago Rodríguez Taverna were the defending champions but chose not to defend their title.

Hady Habib and Trey Hilderbrand won the title after defeating Ignacio Carou and Facundo Mena 6–7^{(5–7)}, 6–2, [10–4] in the final.

== Seeds ==
1. (Brazil) Luís Britto / (Argentina) Gonzalo Villanueva (first round)
2. (Japan) Seita Watanabe / (Japan) Takeru Yuzuki (semifinals)
3. (Brazil) Pedro Boscardin Dias / (Brazil) Pedro Sakamoto (first round)
4. (Bolivia) Hugo Dellien / (Bolivia) Murkel Dellien (withdrew)

== Draw ==
Key

- Q = Qualifier
- WC = Wild card
- LL = Lucky loser
- Alt = Alternate
- ITF = ITF entry
- PR = Protected ranking
- SR = Special ranking
- SE = Special exempt
- JE = Junior exempt
- JR = Junior Accelerator Programme entrant
- CO = College Accelerator Programme entrant
- NG = Next Gen Accelerator Program entrant
- w/o = Walkover
- r = Retired
- d = Defaulted

=== Draw ===
First round
1	(Brazil) L Britto (Argentina) G Villanueva	4	3
(Argentina) Tomás Farjat (Argentina) AL Lingua Lavallén	6	6
(Argentina) L Midón (Argentina) Lorenzo Joaquín Rodríguez	3	3
(Lebanon) H Habib (United States) T Hilderbrand	6	6
3	(Brazil) P Boscardin Dias (Brazil) P Sakamoto	3	7	[5]
(Argentina) Leonardo Aboian (Argentina) V Aboian	6	5	[10]
(Argentina) F Ribero (Argentina) JB Torres	7	6
(Argentina) H Casanova (Argentina) A Collarini	5	2
WC	(Argentina) Thiago Cigarrán (Argentina) S de la Fuente	6^{8}	5
Aleksandr Lobanov; Alexey Nesterov	7^{10}	7
(Uruguay) I Carou (Argentina) F Mena	6	6
Alt	(Colombia) Juan Sebastián Osorio (Brazil) Rafael Tosetto	3	3
(Brazil) Wilson Leite (Brazil) M Pucinelli de Almeida	6	6
WC	(Argentina) Lautaro Agustín Corthey (Argentina) Tadeo David Ramírez	3	4
(Spain) Diego Augusto Barreto Sánchez (Colombia) JS Gómez	4	1
2	(Japan) S Watanabe (Japan) T Yuzuki	6	6

Quarterfinals
(Argentina) T Farjat (Argentina) AL Lingua Lavallén	4	4
(Lebanon) H Habib (United States) T Hilderbrand	6	6
(Argentina) L Aboian (Argentina) V Aboian	6	6
(Argentina) F Ribero (Argentina) JB Torres	4	0
A Lobanov; A Nesterov	1	3
(Uruguay) I Carou (Argentina) F Mena	6	6
(Brazil) W Leite (Brazil) M Pucinelli de Almeida	4	3
2	(Japan) S Watanabe (Japan) T Yuzuki	6	6

Semifinals
(Lebanon) H Habib (United States) T Hilderbrand	6	6^{1}	[10]
(Argentina) L Aboian (Argentina) V Aboian	4	7^{7}	[6]
(Uruguay) I Carou (Argentina) F Mena	7^{7}	7^{7}
2	(Japan) S Watanabe (Japan) T Yuzuki	6^{5}	6^{4}

Final
(Lebanon) H Habib (United States) T Hilderbrand	6^{5}	6	[10]
(Uruguay) I Carou (Argentina) F Mena	7^{7}	2	[4]
