= 2022 Tampere Open – Singles =

Singles
- 2022 Tampere Open

Final
- Champion: (Hungary) Zsombor Piros
- Runner-up: (France) Harold Mayot
- Score: 6–2, 1–6, 6–4

Events
Singles	Doubles
← 2021 ·	Tampere Open	· 2023 →

Jiří Lehečka was the defending champion but chose not to defend his title.

Zsombor Piros won the title after defeating Harold Mayot 6–2, 1–6, 6–4 in the final.

== Seeds ==
1. (Argentina) Juan Manuel Cerúndolo (semifinals)
2. (Germany) Mats Moraing (first round)
3. (Germany) Maximilian Marterer (quarterfinals)
4. (Austria) Jurij Rodionov (second round)
5. (Hungary) Zsombor Piros (champion)
6. (Argentina) Thiago Agustín Tirante (second round)
7. (Bulgaria) Dimitar Kuzmanov (first round)
8. (Italy) Alessandro Giannessi (first round)

== Draw ==
=== Key ===
- Q = Qualifier
- WC = Wild card
- LL = Lucky loser
- Alt = Alternate
- SE = Special exempt
- PR = Protected ranking
- ITF = ITF entry
- JE = Junior exempt
- w/o = Walkover
- r = Retired
- d = Defaulted
- SR = Special ranking

=== Finals ===
Semifinals
1	(Argentina) Juan Manuel Cerúndolo	7^{7}	3	1
Q	(France) Harold Mayot	6^{3}	6	6
5	(Hungary) Zsombor Piros	5
(France) Laurent Lokoli	2^{r}

Final
Q	(France) Harold Mayot	2	6	4
5	(Hungary) Zsombor Piros	6	1	6

=== Top half ===
First round
1	(Argentina) JM Cerúndolo	7^{7}	6
Alt	(Austria) L Miedler	6^{2}	2
WC	(Finland) P Niklas-Salminen	2	3
(Italy) L Giustino	6	6
(Croatia) D Ajduković	6	4	6^{1}
(Portugal) F Ferreira Silva	2	6	7^{7}
(Argentina) N Kicker	6	6
8	(Italy) A Giannessi	4	3
4	(Austria) J Rodionov	4	6	7
Q	(Tunisia) M Echargui	6	1	5
Q	(France) C Tabur	3	3
(Netherlands) J Sels	6	6
WC	(Finland) E Vasa	4	4
Q	(France) H Mayot	6	6
LL	(Portugal) J Domingues	6	7
7	(Bulgaria) D Kuzmanov	3	5

Second round
1	(Argentina) JM Cerúndolo	7^{7}	6
(Italy) L Giustino	6^{2}	1
(Portugal) F Ferreira Silva	7^{7}	7
(Argentina) N Kicker	6^{5}	5
4	(Austria) J Rodionov	5	6^{3}
(Netherlands) J Sels	7	7^{7}
Q	(France) H Mayot	7	7
LL	(Portugal) J Domingues	5	5

Quarterfinals
1	(Argentina) JM Cerúndolo	6	6
(Portugal) F Ferreira Silva	1	2
(Netherlands) J Sels	4	6	2
Q	(France) H Mayot	6	3	6

Semifinals
1	(Argentina) JM Cerúndolo	7^{7}	3	1
Q	(France) H Mayot	6^{3}	6	6

=== Bottom half ===
First round
5	(Hungary) Z Piros	6	6
WC	(Sweden) L Borg	2	3
Q	(Italy) Luigi Sorrentino	6	4	6
Alt	(Finland) O Virtanen	4	6	4
(France) E Furness	7	6
(Germany) C-M Stebe	5	3
(Czech Republic) J Forejtek	2	0
3	(Germany) M Marterer	6	6
6	(Argentina) TA Tirante	6	6
(Slovakia) F Horanský	3	2
Q	(France) A Fils	7^{7}	4	2
(France) L Lokoli	6^{4}	6	6
Q	(Argentina) JB Torres	6^{3}	3
(Austria) S Ofner	7^{7}	6
(Austria) G Melzer	6^{5}	6	6
2	(Germany) M Moraing	7^{7}	4	1

Second round
5	(Hungary) Z Piros	3	7^{12}	6
Q	(Italy) L Sorrentino	6	6^{10}	2
(France) E Furness	3	1
3	(Germany) M Marterer	6	6
6	(Argentina) TA Tirante	6	2	3
(France) L Lokoli	3	6	6
(Austria) S Ofner	3	6^{4}
(Austria) G Melzer	6	7^{7}

Quarterfinals
5	(Hungary) Z Piros	6	6
3	(Germany) M Marterer	3	3
(France) L Lokoli	7^{7}	4	7
(Austria) G Melzer	6^{5}	6	5

Semifinals
5	(Hungary) Z Piros	5
(France) L Lokoli	2^{r}
