= 2023 Challenger Santa Fe – Doubles =

Doubles
- 2023 Challenger Santa Fe

Final
- Champions: (United States) Vasil Kirkov (Chile) Matías Soto
- Runners-up: (Uruguay) Ignacio Carou (Argentina) Ignacio Monzón
- Score: 7–6^{(7–3)}, 6–2

Events
Singles	Doubles
- Challenger Santa Fe

This was the first edition of the tournament.

Vasil Kirkov and Matías Soto won the title after defeating Ignacio Carou and Ignacio Monzón 7–6^{(7–3)}, 6–2 in the final.

== Seeds ==
1. (Uruguay) Ignacio Carou / (Argentina) Ignacio Monzón (final)
2. (United States) Vasil Kirkov / (Chile) Matías Soto (champions)
3. (Brazil) Mateus Alves / (Brazil) Eduardo Ribeiro (semifinals)
4. (Argentina) Santiago de la Fuente / (Argentina) Tomás Farjat (semifinals)

== Draw ==
Key

- Q = Qualifier
- WC = Wild card
- LL = Lucky loser
- Alt = Alternate
- ITF = ITF entry
- PR = Protected ranking
- SR = Special ranking
- SE = Special exempt
- JE = Junior exempt
- JR = Junior Accelerator Programme entrant
- CO = College Accelerator Programme entrant
- NG = Next Gen Accelerator Program entrant
- w/o = Walkover
- r = Retired
- d = Defaulted

First round
Alt	(Argentina) Francisco Faigenbaum (Argentina) Rocco Valente	2	3
(Argentina) Lorenzo Joaquín Rodríguez (Argentina) Fermín Tenti	6	6
(Brazil) L Britto (United States) Preston Brown	6	1	[5]
WC	(Argentina) RA Burruchaga (Argentina) Lucca Guercio	3	6	[10]

Quarterfinals
1	(Uruguay) I Carou (Argentina) Ignacio Monzón	6	6
WC	(Argentina) Nicolás García Longo (Argentina) Gonzalo Zeitune	4	2
4	(Argentina) S de la Fuente (Argentina) Tomás Farjat	6	3	[10]
(Argentina) LJ Rodríguez (Argentina) F Tenti	4	6	[7]
WC	(Argentina) RA Burruchaga (Argentina) L Guercio	3	6	[7]
3	(Brazil) M Alves (Brazil) E Ribeiro	6	3	[10]
(Argentina) JM La Serna (Argentina) Luciano Tacchi	7^{7}	0	[8]
2	(United States) V Kirkov (Chile) M Soto	6^{1}	6	[10]

Semifinals
1	(Uruguay) I Carou (Argentina) I Monzón	6	3	[10]
4	(Argentina) S de la Fuente (Argentina) T Farjat	0	6	[5]
3	(Brazil) M Alves (Brazil) E Ribeiro	0	3
2	(United States) V Kirkov (Chile) M Soto	6	6

Final
1	(Uruguay) I Carou (Argentina) I Monzón	6^{3}	2
2	(United States) V Kirkov (Chile) M Soto	7^{7}	6
