= 2025 Challenger Santa Fe – Singles =

Singles
- 2025 Challenger Santa Fe

Final
- Champion: (Brazil) João Lucas Reis da Silva
- Runner-up: (Argentina) Lautaro Midón
- Score: 6–4, 6–3

Events
Singles	Doubles
- Challenger Santa Fe

Andrea Collarini was the defending champion but lost in the semifinals to João Lucas Reis da Silva.

Reis da Silva won the title after defeating Lautaro Midón 6–4, 6–3 in the final.

== Seeds ==
1. (Ecuador) Álvaro Guillén Meza (first round)
2. (Argentina) Santiago Rodríguez Taverna (quarterfinals)
3. (Argentina) Andrea Collarini (semifinals)
4. (Brazil) Matheus Pucinelli de Almeida (quarterfinals)
5. (Argentina) Juan Bautista Torres (first round)
6. (Argentina) Genaro Alberto Olivieri (first round)
7. (Argentina) Lautaro Midón (final)
8. (Brazil) Pedro Sakamoto (first round)

== Draw ==
Key

- Q = Qualifier
- WC = Wild card
- LL = Lucky loser
- Alt = Alternate
- ITF = ITF entry
- PR = Protected ranking
- SR = Special ranking
- SE = Special exempt
- JE = Junior exempt
- JR = Junior Accelerator Programme entrant
- CO = College Accelerator Programme entrant
- NG = Next Gen Accelerator Program entrant
- w/o = Walkover
- r = Retired
- d = Defaulted

=== Finals ===
Semifinals
(Brazil) João Lucas Reis da Silva	6	6
3	(Argentina) Andrea Collarini	2	4
Q	(United States) Dali Blanch	2	1
7	(Argentina) Lautaro Midón	6	6

Final
(Brazil) João Lucas Reis da Silva	6	6
7	(Argentina) Lautaro Midón	4	3

=== Top half ===
First round
1	(Ecuador) Á Guillén Meza	4	6	5
(Argentina) M Kestelboim	6	2	7
(Brazil) JL Reis da Silva	6	6
Q	(Brazil) Igor Gimenez	3	4
(Brazil) P Boscardin Dias	6	6
(Argentina) JM La Serna	2	0
(Peru) G Bueno	6	6
5	(Argentina) JB Torres	3	3
3	(Argentina) A Collarini	6	7
LL	(Spain) Diego Augusto Barreto Sánchez	4	5
Q	(Germany) Lucas Gerch	6^{7}	7^{7}	3
(Argentina) G Villanueva	7^{9}	6^{3}	6
(Argentina) Tomás Farjat	3	4
(Thailand) M Jones	6	6
(Argentina) H Casanova	6	6
6	(Argentina) GA Olivieri	3	3

Second round
(Argentina) M Kestelboim	1	2
(Brazil) JL Reis da Silva	6	6
(Brazil) P Boscardin Dias	3	6^{7}
(Peru) G Bueno	6	7^{9}
3	(Argentina) A Collarini	6	6
(Argentina) G Villanueva	4	4
(Thailand) M Jones	3	2
(Argentina) H Casanova	6	6

Quarterfinals
(Brazil) JL Reis da Silva	6	6
(Peru) G Bueno	3	3
3	(Argentina) A Collarini	6	6
(Argentina) H Casanova	4	3

Semifinals
(Brazil) JL Reis da Silva	6	6
3	(Argentina) A Collarini	2	4

=== Bottom half ===
First round
8	(Brazil) P Sakamoto	7	1	0
Q	(United States) Dali Blanch	5	6	6
Alt	(United States) B Kuzuhara	6	2	7
(Uruguay) F Roncadelli	0	6	5
(Argentina) LE Ambrogi	7	6
WC	(Argentina) Thiago Cigarrán	5	0
Q	(Brazil) Wilson Leite	2	4
4	(Brazil) M Pucinelli de Almeida	6	6
7	(Argentina) L Midón	6	7
Q	(Argentina) Lorenzo Joaquín Rodríguez	1	5
WC	(Argentina) F Bagnis	6	6
Alt	(Peru) C Huertas del Pino	3	4
LL	(Germany) John Sperle	7^{7}	6
WC	(Argentina) R Olivo	6^{4}	2
Q	(Uruguay) J Aguilar Cardozo	5	3
2	(Argentina) S Rodríguez Taverna	7	6

Second round
Q	(United States) Dal Blanch	7	6
Alt	(United States) B Kuzuhara	5	2
(Argentina) LE Ambrogi	6^{3}	6	1
4	(Brazil) M Pucinelli de Almeida	7^{7}	4	6
7	(Argentina) L Midón	7	6
WC	(Argentina) F Bagnis	5	4
LL	(Germany) J Sperle	6^{7}	2
2	(Argentina) S Rodríguez Taverna	7^{9}	6

Quarterfinals
Q	(United States) Dal Blanch	7	4	6
4	(Brazil) M Pucinelli de Almeida	5	6	4
7	(Argentina) L Midón	6	7^{9}
2	(Argentina) S Rodríguez Taverna	2	6^{7}

Semifinals
Q	(United States) Dal Blanch	2	1
7	(Argentina) L Midón	6	6
