= 2025 Challenger Santa Fe – Doubles =

Doubles
- 2025 Challenger Santa Fe

Final
- Champions: (Argentina) Mariano Kestelboim (Argentina) Gonzalo Villanueva
- Runners-up: (Argentina) Santiago de la Fuente (Argentina) Genaro Alberto Olivieri
- Score: 6–1, 2–6, [11–9]

Events
Singles	Doubles
- Challenger Santa Fe

Hady Habib and Trey Hilderbrand were the defending champions but chose not to defend their title.

Mariano Kestelboim and Gonzalo Villanueva won the title after defeating Santiago de la Fuente and Genaro Alberto Olivieri 6–1, 2–6, [11–9] in the final.

== Seeds ==
1. (Argentina) Mariano Kestelboim / (Argentina) Gonzalo Villanueva (champions)
2. (Thailand) Pruchya Isaro / (Canada) Kelsey Stevenson (first round)
3. (Peru) Arklon Huertas del Pino / (Peru) Conner Huertas del Pino (first round)
4. (Brazil) Luís Britto / (Uruguay) Ignacio Carou (semifinals)

== Draw ==
Key

- Q = Qualifier
- WC = Wild card
- LL = Lucky loser
- Alt = Alternate
- ITF = ITF entry
- PR = Protected ranking
- SR = Special ranking
- SE = Special exempt
- JE = Junior exempt
- JR = Junior Accelerator Programme entrant
- CO = College Accelerator Programme entrant
- NG = Next Gen Accelerator Program entrant
- w/o = Walkover
- r = Retired
- d = Defaulted

=== Draw ===
First round
1	(Argentina) M Kestelboim (Argentina) G Villanueva	6	6
(Argentina) LE Ambrogi (Argentina) Tomás Farjat	1	0
(Brazil) M Barreiros Reyes (United States) B Kuzuhara	6	2	[10]
(Peru) G Bueno (Argentina) JB Torres	1	6	[3]
4	(Brazil) L Britto (Uruguay) I Carou	5	7	[10]
(United States) S Bangoura (Israel) R Stepanov	7	5	[6]
(Argentina) Leonardo Aboian (Argentina) Lorenzo Joaquín Rodríguez	3	4
(Germany) Lucas Gerch (Germany) John Sperle	6	6
(Argentina) H Casanova (Argentina) S Rodríguez Taverna	1	6	[10]
(Brazil) JL Reis da Silva (Uruguay) F Roncadelli	6	1	[12]
WC	(Argentina) S de la Fuente (Argentina) GA Olivieri	6	4	[10]
3	(Peru) A Huertas del Pino (Peru) C Huertas del Pino	2	6	[8]
WC	(Argentina) Tomás Martínez (Argentina) Ezequiel Monferrer	4	6^{4}
(Ecuador) Á Guillén Meza (Argentina) Bautista Vilicich	6	7^{7}
Alt	(Spain) Diego Augusto Barreto Sánchez (United States) Dali Blanch	6	4	[10]
2	(Thailand) P Isaro (Canada) K Stevenson	1	6	[5]

Quarterfinals
1	(Argentina) M Kestelboim (Argentina) G Villanueva	7	6
(Brazil) M Barreiros Reyes (United States) B Kuzuhara	5	3
4	(Brazil) L Britto (Uruguay) I Carou	7^{7}	6
(Germany) L Gerch (Germany) J Sperle	6^{3}	4
(Brazil) JL Reis da Silva (Uruguay) F Roncadelli	4	6	[8]
WC	(Argentina) S de la Fuente (Argentina) GA Olivieri	6	3	[10]
(Ecuador) Á Guillén Meza (Argentina) B Vilicich
Alt	(Spain) DA Barreto Sánchez (United States) Dal Blanch	w/o

Semifinals
1	(Argentina) M Kestelboim (Argentina) G Villanueva	6	6^{5}	[10]
4	(Brazil) L Britto (Uruguay) I Carou	4	7^{7}	[6]
WC	(Argentina) S de la Fuente (Argentina) GA Olivieri	w/o
Alt	(Spain) DA Barreto Sánchez (United States) Dal Blanch

Final
1	(Argentina) M Kestelboim (Argentina) G Villanueva	6	2	[11]
WC	(Argentina) S de la Fuente (Argentina) GA Olivieri	1	6	[9]
