= 2023 Challenger Santa Fe II =

- Date: 16 – 21 October
- Edition: 2nd
- Surface: Clay
- Location: Santa Fe, Argentina

Champions

Singles
- (Argentina) Mariano Navone

Doubles
- (Switzerland) Luca Margaroli / (Argentina) Santiago Rodríguez Taverna
| ← 2023 · | Challenger Santa Fe | · 2024 → |

The 2023 Challenger Santa Fe II was a professional tennis tournament played on clay courts. It was the second edition of the tournament which was part of the 2023 ATP Challenger Tour. It took place in Santa Fe, Argentina between 16 and 21 October 2023.

== Singles main-draw entrants ==
=== Seeds ===
| Country | Player | Rank^{1} | Seed |
|---|---|---|---|
| ARG | Federico Coria | 83 | 1 |
| ARG | Juan Manuel Cerúndolo | 102 | 2 |
| CHI | Tomás Barrios Vera | 108 | 3 |
| CZE | Vít Kopřiva | 114 | 4 |
| ARG | Francisco Comesaña | 126 | 5 |
| GBR | Jan Choinski | 127 | 6 |
| ARG | Genaro Alberto Olivieri | 131 | 7 |
| BRA | Felipe Meligeni Alves | 143 | 8 |

- ^{1} Rankings are as of 2 October 2023.

=== Other entrants ===
The following players received wildcards into the singles main draw:

- (Argentina) Román Andrés Burruchaga
- (Argentina) Federico Delbonis
- (Argentina) Juan Bautista Torres

The following player received entry into the singles main draw as an alternate:

- (Argentina) Marco Trungelliti

The following players received entry from the qualifying draw:

- (Argentina) Alex Barrena
- (Jamaica) Blaise Bicknell
- (Brazil) Pedro Boscardin Dias
- (Colombia) Nicolás Mejía
- (Spain) Carlos Taberner
- (Paraguay) Daniel Vallejo

The following player received entry as a lucky loser:

- (Argentina) Juan Pablo Ficovich

== Champions ==
=== Singles ===
- (Argentina) Mariano Navone def. (Italy) Andrea Pellegrino 3–6, 6–2, 6–3.

=== Doubles ===
- (Switzerland) Luca Margaroli / (Argentina) Santiago Rodríguez Taverna def. (Italy) Franco Agamenone / (Argentina) Mariano Kestelboim 7–6^{(7–2)}, 6–4.
