= 2023 Tampere Open – Doubles =

Doubles
- 2023 Tampere Open

Final
- Champions: (Poland) Szymon Kielan (Poland) Piotr Matuszewski
- Runners-up: (Ukraine) Vladyslav Orlov (Australia) Adam Taylor
- Score: 6–4, 7–6^{(9–7)}

Events
Singles	Doubles
← 2022 ·	Tampere Open	· 2024 →

Alexander Erler and Lucas Miedler were the defending champions but chose not to defend their title.

Szymon Kielan and Piotr Matuszewski won the title after defeating Vladyslav Orlov and Adam Taylor 6–4, 7–6^{(9–7)} in the final.

== Seeds ==
1. (Austria) Neil Oberleitner / (Poland) Szymon Walków (quarterfinals)
2. (Argentina) Hernán Casanova / (Argentina) Tomás Lipovšek Puches (quarterfinals)
3. (Poland) Szymon Kielan / (Poland) Piotr Matuszewski (champions)
4. (Ukraine) Eric Vanshelboim / (Switzerland) Damien Wenger (quarterfinals)

== Draw ==
=== Key ===
- Q = Qualifier
- WC = Wild card
- LL = Lucky loser
- Alt = Alternate
- SE = Special exempt
- PR = Protected ranking
- ITF = ITF entry
- JE = Junior exempt
- w/o = Walkover
- r = Retired
- d = Defaulted
- SR = Special ranking

First round
1	(Austria) N Oberleitner (Poland) S Walków	7^{7}	2	[10]
(Spain) D Rincón (Spain) N Sánchez Izquierdo	6^{5}	6	[7]
(Finland) Patrick Kaukovalta (Finland) E Vasa	7	6
(Switzerland) R Bertola (Germany) Elmar Ejupovic	5	1
3	(Poland) S Kielan (Poland) P Matuszewski	4	6	[10]
(Romania) Dragoș Nicolae Cazacu (Romania) Alexandru Cristian Dumitru	6	1	[7]
(Tunisia) M Echargui (Italy) Federico Iannaccone	3	6^{7}
(Brazil) JL Reis da Silva (Argentina) Matías Zukas	6	7^{9}
WC	(Finland) Vesa Ahti (Finland) Roni Rikkonen	3	4
4	(Ukraine) Eric Vanshelboim (Switzerland) D Wenger	6	6
(Poland) M Kaśnikowski (Czech Republic) D Svrčina	4	3
(Ukraine) V Orlov (Australia) A Taylor	6	6
WC	(Finland) Hermanni Tiainen (Finland) Jussi Tiainen	2	3
2	(Argentina) H Casanova (Argentina) T Lipovšek Puches	6	6

Quarterfinals
1	(Austria) N Oberleitner (Poland) S Walków	4	5
(Finland) P Kaukovalta (Finland) E Vasa	6	7
3	(Poland) S Kielan (Poland) P Matuszewski	6	6
(Estonia) Johannes Seeman (Estonia) S Troost	2	2
(Brazil) JL Reis da Silva (Argentina) M Zukas	6^{5}	7	[10]
4	(Ukraine) E Vanshelboim (Switzerland) D Wenger	7^{7}	5	[5]
(Ukraine) V Orlov (Australia) A Taylor	5	6	[10]
2	(Argentina) H Casanova (Argentina) T Lipovšek Puches	7	2	[5]

Semifinals
(Finland) P Kaukovalta (Finland) E Vasa	4	7	[8]
3	(Poland) S Kielan (Poland) P Matuszewski	6	5	[10]
(Brazil) JL Reis da Silva (Argentina) M Zukas	6	2	[6]
(Ukraine) V Orlov (Australia) A Taylor	3	6	[10]

Final
3	(Poland) S Kielan (Poland) P Matuszewski	6	7^{9}
(Ukraine) V Orlov (Australia) A Taylor	4	6^{7}
