= 2023 Challenger Santa Fe II – Doubles =

Doubles
- 2023 Challenger Santa Fe II

Final
- Champions: (Switzerland) Luca Margaroli (Argentina) Santiago Rodríguez Taverna
- Runners-up: (Italy) Franco Agamenone (Argentina) Mariano Kestelboim
- Score: 7–6^{(7–2)}, 6–4

Events
Singles	Doubles
- Challenger Santa Fe

Vasil Kirkov and Matías Soto were the defending champions but chose not to defend their title.

Luca Margaroli and Santiago Rodríguez Taverna won the title after defeating Franco Agamenone and Mariano Kestelboim 7–6^{(7–2)}, 6–4 in the final.

== Seeds ==
1. (Ecuador) Diego Hidalgo / (Colombia) Cristian Rodríguez (semifinals)
2. (Brazil) Orlando Luz / (Brazil) Marcelo Zormann (semifinals)
3. (Switzerland) Luca Margaroli / (Argentina) Santiago Rodríguez Taverna (champions)
4. (Argentina) Guido Andreozzi / (Argentina) Román Andrés Burruchaga (quarterfinals)

== Draw ==
Key

- Q = Qualifier
- WC = Wild card
- LL = Lucky loser
- Alt = Alternate
- ITF = ITF entry
- PR = Protected ranking
- SR = Special ranking
- SE = Special exempt
- JE = Junior exempt
- JR = Junior Accelerator Programme entrant
- CO = College Accelerator Programme entrant
- NG = Next Gen Accelerator Program entrant
- w/o = Walkover
- r = Retired
- d = Defaulted

First round
1	(Ecuador) D Hidalgo (Colombia) C Rodríguez	6	7^{7}
(Peru) C Huertas del Pino (Australia) A Taylor	1	6^{3}
(Brazil) P Boscardin Dias (Argentina) G Villanueva
Alt	(United States) A Ayeni (Italy) Facundo Juárez	w/o
(Italy) F Agamenone (Argentina) M Kestelboim	6^{4}	6	[10]
(Czech Republic) V Kopřiva (Czech Republic) D Svrčina	7^{7}	0	[6]
(Brazil) F Romboli (Argentina) M Trungelliti
(Colombia) N Mejía (Colombia) A Urrea	w/o
(Italy) R Bonadio (Spain) C Taberner
3	(Switzerland) L Margaroli (Argentina) S Rodríguez Taverna	w/o
WC	(Argentina) LE Ambrogi (Argentina) Mateo del Pino	6^{5}	1
WC	(Argentina) Lautaro Agustín Corthey (Argentina) Agustín Mastri	7^{7}	6

Quarterfinals
1	(Ecuador) D Hidalgo (Colombia) C Rodríguez	6	6
Alt	(United States) A Ayeni (Italy) F Juárez	4	2
4	(Argentina) G Andreozzi (Argentina) RA Burruchaga	2	4
(Italy) F Agamenone (Argentina) M Kestelboim	6	6
(Colombia) N Mejía (Colombia) A Urrea	6	5	[5]
3	(Switzerland) L Margaroli (Argentina) S Rodríguez Taverna	3	7	[10]
WC	(Argentina) LA Corthey (Argentina) A Mastri	2	1
2	(Brazil) O Luz (Brazil) M Zormann	6	6

Semifinals
1	(Ecuador) D Hidalgo (Colombia) C Rodríguez	2	4
(Italy) F Agamenone (Argentina) M Kestelboim	6	6
3	(Switzerland) L Margaroli (Argentina) S Rodríguez Taverna	5	6	[10]
2	(Brazil) O Luz (Brazil) M Zormann	7	4	[4]

Final
(Italy) F Agamenone (Argentina) M Kestelboim	6^{2}	4
3	(Switzerland) L Margaroli (Argentina) S Rodríguez Taverna	7^{7}	6
