= 2023 Challenger Santa Fe – Singles =

Singles
- 2023 Challenger Santa Fe

Final
- Champion: (Argentina) Mariano Navone
- Runner-up: (Paraguay) Daniel Vallejo
- Score: 6–2, 6–4

Events
Singles	Doubles
- Challenger Santa Fe

This was the first edition of the tournament.

Mariano Navone won the title after defeating Daniel Vallejo 6–2, 6–4 in the final.

== Seeds ==
1. (Argentina) Mariano Navone (champion)
2. (Argentina) Santiago Rodríguez Taverna (first round)
3. (Argentina) Román Andrés Burruchaga (semifinals)
4. (Argentina) Francisco Comesaña (semifinals)
5. (Brazil) Gustavo Heide (first round)
6. (Brazil) Eduardo Ribeiro (first round)
7. (Peru) Nicolás Álvarez (withdrew)
8. (Brazil) Pedro Boscardin Dias (quarterfinals)
9. (Argentina) Matías Franco Descotte (second round)

== Draw ==
Key

- Q = Qualifier
- WC = Wild card
- LL = Lucky loser
- Alt = Alternate
- ITF = ITF entry
- PR = Protected ranking
- SR = Special ranking
- SE = Special exempt
- JE = Junior exempt
- JR = Junior Accelerator Programme entrant
- CO = College Accelerator Programme entrant
- NG = Next Gen Accelerator Program entrant
- w/o = Walkover
- r = Retired
- d = Defaulted

=== Finals ===
Semifinals
1	(Argentina) Mariano Navone	7	7
4	(Argentina) Francisco Comesaña	5	5
3	(Argentina) Román Andrés Burruchaga	6	6^{5}	4
Q	(Paraguay) Daniel Vallejo	4	7^{7}	6

Final
1	(Argentina) Mariano Navone	6	6
Q	(Paraguay) Daniel Vallejo	2	4

=== Top half ===
First round
1	(Argentina) M Navone	6	6
(Brazil) JVC Loureiro	2	4
LL	(Uruguay) I Carou	6	3	1
(Argentina) LE Ambrogi	4	6	6
(Argentina) Tomás Farjat	6^{5}	6	6
(Argentina) Fermín Tenti	7^{7}	4	3
Q	(Brazil) Igor Gimenez	6	4	6
6	(Brazil) E Ribeiro	2	6	4
4	(Argentina) F Comesaña	6	6
(Argentina) GI Justo	2	4
(Chile) G Lama	6	6^{2}	6
(Argentina) Lorenzo Joaquín Rodríguez	3	7^{7}	4
(Chile) M Soto	6	7^{7}
Q	(Chile) Nicolás Villalón	2	6^{5}
Q	(Ecuador) Á Guillén Meza	6	6
5	(Brazil) G Heide	4	4

Second round
1	(Argentina) M Navone	6	6
(Argentina) LE Ambrogi	4	1
(Argentina) T Farjat	6	6^{3}	6
Q	(Brazil) I Gimenez	3	7^{7}	2
4	(Argentina) F Comesaña	6	6
(Chile) G Lama	3	3
(Chile) M Soto	3	1
Q	(Ecuador) Á Guillén Meza	6	6

Quarterfinals
1	(Argentina) M Navone	6	6
(Argentina) T Farjat	2	3
4	(Argentina) F Comesaña	6	7^{7}
Q	(Ecuador) Á Guillén Meza	0	6^{3}

Semifinals
1	(Argentina) M Navone	7	7
4	(Argentina) F Comesaña	5	5

=== Bottom half ===
First round
8	(Brazil) P Boscardin Dias	7^{7}	6
Alt	(United States) Preston Brown	6^{5}	3
(United States) B Kuzuhara	6	6
(Monaco) L Catarina	2	4
Q	(Argentina) Lautaro Corthey	1	4
Q	(Argentina) Luciano Tacchi	6	6
(Brazil) M Alves	2	6	3
3	(Argentina) RA Burruchaga	6	3	6
9	(Argentina) MF Descotte	6	6
WC	(Argentina) Lucio Ratti	0	2
(Argentina) S de la Fuente	6	3	0
Q	(Paraguay) AD Vallejo	4	6	6
(Argentina) Ignacio Monzón	6	7
Alt	(Argentina) JM La Serna	3	5
WC	(Argentina) AL Lingua Lavallén	6	3	6
2	(Argentina) S Rodríguez Taverna	4	6	3

Second round
8	(Brazil) P Boscardin Dias	7^{8}	4	6
(United States) B Kuzuhara	6^{6}	6	3
Q	(Argentina) L Tacchi	6^{2}	3
3	(Argentina) RA Burruchaga	7^{7}	6
9	(Argentina) MF Descotte	6	4	1
Q	(Paraguay) AD Vallejo	3	6	6
(Argentina) I Monzón	7^{7}	6
WC	(Argentina) AL Lingua Lavallén	6^{1}	3

Quarterfinals
8	(Brazil) P Boscardin Dias	3	5
3	(Argentina) RA Burruchaga	6	7
Q	(Paraguay) AD Vallejo	6	6
(Argentina) I Monzón	0	4

Semifinals
3	(Argentina) RA Burruchaga	6	6^{5}	4
Q	(Paraguay) AD Vallejo	4	7^{7}	6
