= 2023 Tampere Open – Singles =

Singles
- 2023 Tampere Open

Final
- Champion: (India) Sumit Nagal
- Runner-up: (Czech Republic) Dalibor Svrčina
- Score: 6–4, 7–5

Events
Singles	Doubles
← 2022 ·	Tampere Open	· 2024 →

Zsombor Piros was the defending champion but lost in the second round to Henri Squire.

Sumit Nagal won the title after defeating Dalibor Svrčina 6–4, 7–5 in the final.

== Seeds ==
1. (Hungary) Zsombor Piros (second round)
2. (Chile) Cristian Garín (second round, retired)
3. (Slovakia) Lukáš Klein (quarterfinals)
4. (Belgium) Kimmer Coppejans (second round)
5. (Czech Republic) Dalibor Svrčina (final)
6. (Italy) Riccardo Bonadio (second round, retired)
7. (India) Sumit Nagal (champion)
8. (Italy) Edoardo Lavagno (first round)

== Draw ==
=== Key ===
- Q = Qualifier
- WC = Wild card
- LL = Lucky loser
- Alt = Alternate
- SE = Special exempt
- PR = Protected ranking
- ITF = ITF entry
- JE = Junior exempt
- w/o = Walkover
- r = Retired
- d = Defaulted
- SR = Special ranking

=== Finals ===
Semifinals
(Germany) Henri Squire	6^{6}	1
5	(Czech Republic) Dalibor Svrčina	7^{8}	6
(Spain) Daniel Rincón	6	3	2
7	(India) Sumit Nagal	4	6	6

Final
5	(Czech Republic) Dalibor Svrčina	4	5
7	(India) Sumit Nagal	6	7

=== Top half ===
First round
1	(Hungary) Z Piros	6	7^{7}
(Tunisia) M Echargui	4	6^{5}
(Germany) H Squire	3	7	6
Q	(United States) T Kodat	6	5	0
WC	(Finland) Patrick Kaukovalta	3	6^{3}
(Poland) D Michalski	6	7^{7}
(Poland) M Kaśnikowski	4	0
6	(Italy) R Bonadio	6	6
3	(Slovakia) L Klein	6	6
(Germany) Elmar Ejupovic	3	4
(Italy) G Fonio	4	6^{6}
(Czech Republic) V Kopřiva	6	7^{8}
Q	(Switzerland) R Bertola	6	3	0
(Argentina) H Casanova	4	6	6
(Romania) FC Jianu	6	3	3
5	(Czech Republic) D Svrčina	3	6	6

Second round
1	(Hungary) Z Piros	7^{7}	4	1
(Germany) H Squire	6^{3}	6	6
(Poland) D Michalski	7	5
6	(Italy) R Bonadio	5	6^{r}
3	(Slovakia) L Klein	7	6
(Czech Republic) V Kopřiva	5	1
(Argentina) H Casanova	5	6^{5}
5	(Czech Republic) D Svrčina	7	7^{7}

Quarterfinals
(Germany) H Squire	7	1	6
(Poland) D Michalski	5	6	3
3	(Slovakia) L Klein	6^{5}	1
5	(Czech Republic) D Svrčina	7^{7}	6

Semifinals
(Germany) H Squire	6^{6}	1
5	(Czech Republic) D Svrčina	7^{8}	6

=== Bottom half ===
First round
8	(Italy) Edoardo Lavagno	4	3
(Spain) N Sánchez Izquierdo	6	6
Q	(Croatia) D Ajduković	1	7^{8}	6
Q	(Monaco) V Vacherot	6	6^{6}	2
(Spain) D Rincón	6	3	7
Q	(Italy) L Rottoli	2	6	5
Q	(Turkey) E Kırkın	6	5	2
4	(Belgium) K Coppejans	3	7	6
7	(India) S Nagal	6	6
WC	(Czech Republic) J Veselý	4	1
(Brazil) JL Reis da Silva	5	6	6
(Lebanon) B Hassan	7	4	3
(Serbia) M Zekić	2	4
(Tunisia) A Dougaz	6	6
(Croatia) N Serdarušić	6	3	2
2/WC	(Chile) C Garín	1	6	6

Second round
(Spain) N Sánchez Izquierdo	1	6^{5}
Q	(Croatia) D Ajduković	6	7^{7}
(Spain) D Rincón	7	6
4	(Belgium) K Coppejans	5	4
7	(India) S Nagal	6	6^{2}	7^{7}
(Brazil) JL Reis da Silva	3	7^{7}	6^{4}
(Tunisia) A Dougaz	6	4
2/WC	(Chile) C Garín	2	0^{r}

Quarterfinals
Q	(Croatia) D Ajduković	3	1
(Spain) D Rincón	6	6
7	(India) S Nagal	6	6
(Tunisia) A Dougaz	3	3

Semifinals
(Spain) D Rincón	6	3	2
7	(India) S Nagal	4	6	6
