= 2021 Tampere Open – Singles =

Singles
- 2021 Tampere Open

Final
- Champion: (Czech Republic) Jiří Lehečka
- Runner-up: (Argentina) Nicolás Kicker
- Score: 5–7, 6–4, 6–3

Events
Singles	Doubles
- Tampere Open

Mikael Ymer was the defending champion but chose not to defend his title.

Jiří Lehečka won the title after defeating Nicolás Kicker 5–7, 6–4, 6–3 in the final.

== Seeds ==
1. (Netherlands) Botic van de Zandschulp (semifinals)
2. (Switzerland) Henri Laaksonen (withdrew)
3. (France) Antoine Hoang (first round)
4. (Spain) Mario Vilella Martínez (quarterfinals)
5. (Kazakhstan) Dmitry Popko (quarterfinals)
6. (Belgium) Kimmer Coppejans (first round)
7. (France) Alexandre Müller (second round)
8. (Argentina) Guido Andreozzi (second round)

== Draw ==
Key

- Q = Qualifier
- WC = Wild card
- LL = Lucky loser
- Alt = Alternate
- ITF = ITF entry
- PR = Protected ranking
- SR = Special ranking
- SE = Special exempt
- JE = Junior exempt
- JR = Junior Accelerator Programme entrant
- CO = College Accelerator Programme entrant
- NG = Next Gen Accelerator Program entrant
- w/o = Walkover
- r = Retired
- d = Defaulted

=== Finals ===
Semifinals
1	(Netherlands) Botic van de Zandschulp	3	6	3
Q	(Argentina) Nicolás Kicker	6	3	6
(Czech Republic) Jiří Lehečka	6	6
LL	(France) Kyrian Jacquet	3	0

Final
Q	(Argentina) Nicolás Kicker	7	4	3
(Czech Republic) Jiří Lehečka	5	6	6

=== Top half ===
First round
1	(Netherlands) B van de Zandschulp	4	6	6
(Italy) R Bonadio	6	2	2
(United States) JC Aragone	4	4
(Serbia) P Krstin	6	6
(Italy) A Arnaboldi	6	6
(Brazil) F Meligeni Alves	1	4
Alt	(Brazil) O Luz	6^{5}	5
5	(Kazakhstan) D Popko	7^{7}	7
4/SE	(Spain) M Vilella Martínez	4	7^{7}	7
(Portugal) J Domingues	6	6^{5}	5
Q	(Russia) B Bobrov	1	5
(Argentina) P Cachin	6	7
Q	(Argentina) N Kicker	6	6
WC	(Sweden) Leo Borg	3	0
WC	(Finland) P Niklas-Salminen	2	1
7	(France) A Müller	6	6

Second round
1	(Netherlands) B van de Zandschulp	6	6
(Serbia) P Krstin	3	1
(Italy) A Arnaboldi	4	3
5	(Kazakhstan) D Popko	6	6
4/SE	(Spain) M Vilella Martínez	7	6
(Argentina) P Cachin	5	4
Q	(Argentina) N Kicker	6	3	6
7	(France) A Müller	4	6	2

Quarterfinals
1	(Netherlands) B van de Zandschulp	6	7^{7}
5	(Kazakhstan) D Popko	4	6^{0}
4/SE	(Spain) M Vilella Martínez	6^{6}	0
Q	(Argentina) N Kicker	7^{8}	6

Semifinals
1	(Netherlands) B van de Zandschulp	3	6	3
Q	(Argentina) N Kicker	6	3	6

=== Bottom half ===
First round
8	(Argentina) G Andreozzi	6	6
(Germany) M Moraing	4	1
Q	(France) A Cazaux	6	6^{5}	2
WC	(Finland) O Virtanen	3	7^{7}	6
(Chile) N Jarry	6^{3}	6	6
Alt	(Czech Republic) J Forejtek	7^{7}	3	3
(Czech Republic) J Lehečka	6	6
3	(France) A Hoang	1	4
6	(Belgium) K Coppejans	6	3	6^{6}
(Bulgaria) D Kuzmanov	1	6	7^{8}
LL	(France) K Jacquet	2	6	3
(Portugal) G Oliveira	6	1	0^{r}
Q	(France) G Blancaneaux	6	7
(Argentina) F Mena	4	5
(Portugal) G Elias	4	6	5
LL	(Austria) A Erler	6	3	7

Second round
8	(Argentina) G Andreozzi	2	4
WC	(Finland) O Virtanen	6	6
(Chile) N Jarry	4	4
(Czech Republic) J Lehečka	6	6
(Bulgaria) D Kuzmanov	6	4	6^{5}
LL	(France) K Jacquet	3	6	7^{7}
Q	(France) G Blancaneaux	6	4	6
LL	(Austria) A Erler	3	6	2

Quarterfinals
WC	(Finland) O Virtanen	4	1
(Czech Republic) J Lehečka	6	6
LL	(France) K Jacquet	6	6
Q	(France) G Blancaneaux	3	3

Semifinals
(Czech Republic) J Lehečka	6	6
LL	(France) K Jacquet	3	0
