= 2021 Tampere Open =

- Date: 19–25 July
- Edition: 39th
- Surface: Clay
- Location: Tampere, Finland

Champions

Singles
- (Czech Republic) Jiří Lehečka

Doubles
- (Argentina) Pedro Cachin / (Argentina) Facundo Mena
← 2019 ·	Tampere Open	· 2022 →

The 2021 Tampere Open was a professional tennis tournament played on clay courts. It was the 39th edition of the tournament which was part of the 2021 ATP Challenger Tour. It took place in Tampere, Finland, on 19–25 July 2021.

== Men's singles main draw entrants ==
=== Seeds ===
Country	Player	Rank^{1}	Seed
NED	Botic van de Zandschulp	132	1
~~SUI~~	~~Henri Laaksonen~~	~~134~~	~~2~~
FRA	Antoine Hoang	148	3
ESP	Mario Vilella Martínez	178	4
KAZ	Dmitry Popko	185	5
BEL	Kimmer Coppejans	191	6
FRA	Alexandre Müller	197	7
ARG	Guido Andreozzi	206	8

- ^{1} Rankings as of 12 July 2021.

=== Other entrants ===
The following players received wildcards into the singles main draw:

- (Sweden) Leo Borg
- (Finland) Patrik Niklas-Salminen
- (Finland) Otto Virtanen

The following player received entry into the singles main draw as a special exempt:

- (Spain) Mario Vilella Martínez

The following players received entry into the singles main draw as alternates:

- (Czech Republic) Jonáš Forejtek
- (Brazil) Orlando Luz

The following players received entry from the qualifying draw:

- (France) Geoffrey Blancaneaux
- (Russia) Bogdan Bobrov
- (France) Arthur Cazaux
- (Argentina) Nicolás Kicker

The following players received entry as lucky losers:

- (Austria) Alexander Erler
- (France) Kyrian Jacquet

== Champions ==
=== Singles ===
- (Czech Republic) Jiří Lehečka def. (Argentina) Nicolás Kicker 5–7, 6–4, 6–3.

=== Doubles ===
- (Argentina) Pedro Cachin / (Argentina) Facundo Mena def. (Brazil) Orlando Luz / (Brazil) Felipe Meligeni Alves 7–5, 6–3.
