= 2023 Tampere Open =

- Date: 17–23 July
- Edition: 41st
- Surface: Clay
- Location: Tampere, Finland

Champions

Singles
- (India) Sumit Nagal

Doubles
- (Poland) Szymon Kielan / (Poland) Piotr Matuszewski
← 2022 ·	Tampere Open	· 2024 →

The 2023 Tampere Open was a professional tennis tournament played on clay courts. It was the 41st edition of the tournament which was part of the 2023 ATP Challenger Tour. It took place in Tampere, Finland, between 17 and 23 July 2023.

== Singles main draw entrants ==
=== Seeds ===
Country	Player	Rank^{1}	Seed
HUN	Zsombor Piros	113	1
CHI	Cristian Garín	124	2
SVK	Lukáš Klein	152	3
BEL	Kimmer Coppejans	188	4
CZE	Dalibor Svrčina	193	5
ITA	Riccardo Bonadio	194	6
IND	Sumit Nagal	225	7
ITA	Edoardo Lavagno	230	8

- ^{1} Rankings as of 3 July 2023.

=== Other entrants ===
The following players received wildcards into the singles main draw:

- (Chile) Cristian Garín
- (Finland) Patrick Kaukovalta
- (Czech Republic) Jiří Veselý

The following players received entry from the qualifying draw:

- (Croatia) Duje Ajduković
- (Switzerland) Rémy Bertola
- (Turkey) Ergi Kırkın
- (United States) Toby Kodat
- (Italy) Lorenzo Rottoli
- (Monaco) Valentin Vacherot

== Champions ==
=== Singles ===
- (India) Sumit Nagal def. (Czech Republic) Dalibor Svrčina 6–4, 7–5.

=== Doubles ===
- (Poland) Szymon Kielan / (Poland) Piotr Matuszewski def. (Ukraine) Vladyslav Orlov / (Australia) Adam Taylor 6–4, 7–6^{(9–7)}.
