= 2021 Tampere Open – Doubles =

Doubles
- 2021 Tampere Open

Final
- Champions: (Argentina) Pedro Cachin (Argentina) Facundo Mena
- Runners-up: (Brazil) Orlando Luz (Brazil) Felipe Meligeni Alves
- Score: 7–5, 6–3

Events
Singles	Doubles
- Tampere Open

Sander Arends and David Pel were the defending champions but chose not to defend their title.

Pedro Cachin and Facundo Mena won the title after defeating Orlando Luz and Felipe Meligeni Alves 7–5, 6–3 in the final.

== Seeds ==
1. (Brazil) Orlando Luz / (Brazil) Felipe Meligeni Alves (final)
2. (Peru) Sergio Galdós / (Portugal) Gonçalo Oliveira (first round, withdrew)
3. (France) Manuel Guinard / (France) Antoine Hoang (first round, withdrew)
4. (Argentina) Pedro Cachin / (Argentina) Facundo Mena (champions)

== Draw ==
Key

- Q = Qualifier
- WC = Wild card
- LL = Lucky loser
- Alt = Alternate
- ITF = ITF entry
- PR = Protected ranking
- SR = Special ranking
- SE = Special exempt
- JE = Junior exempt
- JR = Junior Accelerator Programme entrant
- CO = College Accelerator Programme entrant
- NG = Next Gen Accelerator Program entrant
- w/o = Walkover
- r = Retired
- d = Defaulted

First round
(Sweden) M Eriksson (Poland) P Matuszewski	3	6	[8]
(France) G Blancaneaux (Austria) A Erler	6	3	[10]
3	(France) M Guinard (France) A Hoang
(Portugal) J Domingues (Kazakhstan) D Popko	w/o
(Philippines) R Gonzales (United States) H Johnson	2	7	[10]
WC	(Sweden) Leo Borg (Finland) O Virtanen	6	5	[4]
(Netherlands) G Smits (Netherlands) B Stevens	6	6
WC	(Finland) Peetu Pohjola (Finland) Roni Rikkonen	3	3
(Switzerland) L Castelnuovo (France) K Jacquet	1	4
4	(Argentina) P Cachin (Argentina) F Mena	6	6
(Argentina) G Andreozzi (Argentina) N Kicker	7	7^{7}
WC	(Finland) E Vasa (Finland) Iiro Vasa	5	6^{5}
(Russia) B Bobrov (Brazil) Oscar José Gutierrez	w/o
2	(Peru) S Galdós (Portugal) G Oliveira

Quarterfinals
1	(Brazil) O Luz (Brazil) F Meligeni Alves	6^{5}	6	[10]
(France) G Blancaneaux (Austria) A Erler	7^{7}	3	[2]
(Portugal) J Domingues (Kazakhstan) D Popko
(Philippines) R Gonzales (United States) H Johnson	w/o
(Netherlands) G Smits (Netherlands) B Stevens	4	3
4	(Argentina) P Cachin (Argentina) F Mena	6	6
(Argentina) G Andreozzi (Argentina) N Kicker	6	6
(Russia) B Bobrov (Brazil) OJ Gutierrez	3	3

Semifinals
1	(Brazil) O Luz (Brazil) F Meligeni Alves	3	6	[10]
(Philippines) R Gonzales (United States) H Johnson	6	1	[8]
4	(Argentina) P Cachin (Argentina) F Mena	6	6
(Argentina) G Andreozzi (Argentina) N Kicker	3	2

Final
1	(Brazil) O Luz (Brazil) F Meligeni Alves	5	3
4	(Argentina) P Cachin (Argentina) F Mena	7	6
