= 2024 Challenger Santa Fe – Singles =

Singles
- 2024 Challenger Santa Fe

Final
- Champion: (Argentina) Andrea Collarini
- Runner-up: (Argentina) Facundo Mena
- Score: 6–2, 6–3

Events
Singles	Doubles
- Challenger Santa Fe

Mariano Navone was the defending champion but chose not to defend his title.

Andrea Collarini won the title after defeating Facundo Mena 6–2, 6–3 in the final.

== Seeds ==
1. (Bolivia) Hugo Dellien (second round, retired)
2. (Bolivia) Murkel Dellien (first round)
3. (Argentina) Santiago Rodríguez Taverna (first round)
4. (Lebanon) Hady Habib (first round)
5. (Peru) Gonzalo Bueno (second round)
6. (Ecuador) Álvaro Guillén Meza (first round)
7. (Argentina) Andrea Collarini (champion)
8. (Brazil) Pedro Sakamoto (first round)

== Draw ==
Key

- Q = Qualifier
- WC = Wild card
- LL = Lucky loser
- Alt = Alternate
- ITF = ITF entry
- PR = Protected ranking
- SR = Special ranking
- SE = Special exempt
- JE = Junior exempt
- JR = Junior Accelerator Programme entrant
- CO = College Accelerator Programme entrant
- NG = Next Gen Accelerator Program entrant
- w/o = Walkover
- r = Retired
- d = Defaulted

=== Finals ===
Semifinals
7	(Argentina) Andrea Collarini	7	6
(Argentina) Gonzalo Villanueva	5	3
(Argentina) Facundo Mena	7^{7}	7^{7}
(United States) Ulises Blanch	6^{3}	6^{5}

Final
7	(Argentina) Andrea Collarini	6	6
(Argentina) Facundo Mena	2	3

=== Top half ===
First round
1	(Bolivia) H Dellien	6	6
Alt	(Brazil) Wilson Leite	4	4
(Argentina) H Casanova	2	1
(Brazil) M Pucinelli de Almeida	6	6
(Argentina) Lorenzo Joaquín Rodríguez	1	1
(Argentina) JB Torres	6	6
WC	(Argentina) AL Lingua Lavallén	1	6^{1}
7	(Argentina) A Collarini	6	7^{7}
4	(Lebanon) H Habib	5	6^{5}
Alt	(Spain) Diego Augusto Barreto Sánchez	7	7^{7}
(Argentina) V Aboian	2	3
Q	(Argentina) Tomás Farjat	6	6
(Argentina) G Villanueva	6	6
WC	(Argentina) Juan Estévez	1	3
WC	(Argentina) Ezequiel Monferrer	7	2	6
6	(Ecuador) Á Guillén Meza	5	6	3

Second round
1	(Bolivia) H Dellien	2^{r}
(Brazil) M Pucinelli de Almeida	5
(Argentina) JB Torres	3	1
7	(Argentina) A Collarini	6	6
Alt	(Spain) DA Barreto Sánchez	4	3
Q	(Argentina) T Farjat	6	6
(Argentina) G Villanueva	6	6
WC	(Argentina) E Monferrer	4	4

Quarterfinals
(Brazil) M Pucinelli de Almeida	7	2	3
7	(Argentina) A Collarini	5	6	6
Q	(Argentina) T Farjat	7	5	4
(Argentina) G Villanueva	5	7	6

Semifinals
7	(Argentina) A Collarini	7	6
(Argentina) G Villanueva	5	3

=== Bottom half ===
First round
5	(Peru) G Bueno	7^{11}	6
Q	(United States) Dali Blanch	6^{9}	3
Q	(Argentina) Leonardo Aboian	6	3	6^{4}
Q	(United States) T Hilderbrand	3	6	7^{7}
(Argentina) F Mena	5	6	7
Q	(Ecuador) E Gómez	7	3	5
(Argentina) GI Justo	6	7
3	(Argentina) S Rodríguez Taverna	3	5
8	(Brazil) P Sakamoto	2	6	5
(Argentina) L Midón	6	4	7
PR	(Peru) N Álvarez	6	3	3
(Brazil) Nicolas Zanellato	4	6	6
(Brazil) P Boscardin Dias	4	6	6
Q	Aleksandr Lobanov	6	3	1
(United States) U Blanch	6	6
2	(Bolivia) M Dellien	4	3

Second round
5	(Peru) G Bueno	7	4	1
Q	(United States) T Hilderbrand	5	6	6
(Argentina) F Mena	7^{7}	6
(Argentina) GI Justo	6^{2}	2
(Argentina) L Midón	6	6
(Brazil) N Zanellato	2	2
(Brazil) P Boscardin Dias	4	4
(United States) U Blanch	6	6

Quarterfinals
Q	(United States) T Hilderbrand	4	6^{3}
(Argentina) F Mena	6	7^{7}
(Argentina) L Midón	4	4
(United States) U Blanch	6	6

Semifinals
(Argentina) F Mena	7^{7}	7^{7}
(United States) U Blanch	6^{3}	6^{5}
