= 2022 Tampere Open =

- Date: 18–24 July
- Edition: 40th
- Surface: Clay
- Location: Tampere, Finland

Champions

Singles
- (Hungary) Zsombor Piros

Doubles
- (Austria) Alexander Erler / (Austria) Lucas Miedler
← 2021 ·	Tampere Open	· 2023 →

The 2022 Tampere Open was a professional tennis tournament played on clay courts. It was the 40th edition of the tournament which was part of the 2022 ATP Challenger Tour. It took place in Tampere, Finland, between 18–24 July 2022.

== Men's singles main draw entrants ==
=== Seeds ===
Country	Player	Rank^{1}	Seed
ARG	Juan Manuel Cerúndolo	114	1
GER	Mats Moraing	133	2
GER	Maximilian Marterer	145	3
AUT	Jurij Rodionov	151	4
HUN	Zsombor Piros	168	5
ARG	Thiago Agustín Tirante	170	6
BUL	Dimitar Kuzmanov	171	7
ITA	Alessandro Giannessi	182	8

- ^{1} Rankings as of 11 July 2022.

=== Other entrants ===
The following players received wildcards into the singles main draw:

- (Sweden) Leo Borg
- (Finland) Patrik Niklas-Salminen
- (Finland) Eero Vasa

The following players received entry into the singles main draw as alternates:

- (Austria) Lucas Miedler
- (Finland) Otto Virtanen

The following players received entry from the qualifying draw:

- (Tunisia) Moez Echargui
- (France) Arthur Fils
- (France) Harold Mayot
- (Italy) Luigi Sorrentino
- (France) Clément Tabur
- (Argentina) Juan Bautista Torres

The following player received entry as a lucky loser:

- (Portugal) João Domingues

== Champions ==
=== Singles ===
- (Hungary) Zsombor Piros def. (France) Harold Mayot 6–2, 1–6, 6–4.

=== Doubles ===
- (Austria) Alexander Erler / (Austria) Lucas Miedler def. (Poland) Karol Drzewiecki / (Finland) Patrik Niklas-Salminen 7–6^{(7–3)}, 6–1.
