= 2022 Tampere Open – Doubles =

Doubles
- 2022 Tampere Open

Final
- Champions: (Austria) Alexander Erler (Austria) Lucas Miedler
- Runners-up: (Poland) Karol Drzewiecki (Finland) Patrik Niklas-Salminen
- Score: 7–6^{(7–3)}, 6–1

Events
Singles	Doubles
- Tampere Open

Pedro Cachin and Facundo Mena were the defending champions but chose not to defend their title.

Alexander Erler and Lucas Miedler won the title after defeating Karol Drzewiecki and Patrik Niklas-Salminen 7–6^{(7–3)}, 6–1 in the final.

== Seeds ==
1. (Austria) Alexander Erler / (Austria) Lucas Miedler (champions)
2. (India) Sriram Balaji / (India) Jeevan Nedunchezhiyan (semifinals)
3. (Austria) Maximilian Neuchrist / (Austria) Tristan-Samuel Weissborn (semifinals)
4. (Poland) Karol Drzewiecki / (Finland) Patrik Niklas-Salminen (final)

== Draw ==
Key

- Q = Qualifier
- WC = Wild card
- LL = Lucky loser
- Alt = Alternate
- ITF = ITF entry
- PR = Protected ranking
- SR = Special ranking
- SE = Special exempt
- JE = Junior exempt
- JR = Junior Accelerator Programme entrant
- CO = College Accelerator Programme entrant
- NG = Next Gen Accelerator Program entrant
- w/o = Walkover
- r = Retired
- d = Defaulted

First round
(India) A Chandrasekar (India) VS Prashanth	4	7^{7}	[10]
(Finland) E Vasa (Finland) Iiro Vasa	6	6^{4}	[8]
3	(Austria) M Neuchrist (Austria) T-S Weissborn	6	6
(Argentina) TA Tirante (Argentina) JB Torres	1	2
(Italy) Lorenzo Bocchi (Italy) Marco Brugnerotto	6	3	[4]
(Australia) A Taylor (Australia) J Taylor	3	6	[10]
WC	(Finland) Santtu Leskinen (Finland) O Virtanen	4	1
(Argentina) Juan Ignacio Galarza (Slovenia) T Lipovšek Puches	6	6
(Italy) A Giannessi (Italy) Luigi Sorrentino
4	(Poland) K Drzewiecki (Finland) P Niklas-Salminen	w/o
(France) K Jacquet (France) C Tabur	6	6
WC	(Finland) Vesa Ahti (Finland) Roni Rikkonen	3	1
(Denmark) B Hannestad (Denmark) J Ingildsen	3	4
2	(India) S Balaji (India) J Nedunchezhiyan	6	6

Quarterfinals
1	(Austria) A Erler (Austria) L Miedler	6	7
(India) A Chandrasekar (India) VS Prashanth	3	5
3	(Austria) M Neuchrist (Austria) T-S Weissborn	6	6
(Australia) A Taylor (Australia) J Taylor	2	3
(Argentina) JI Galarza (Slovenia) T Lipovšek Puches	3	3
4	(Poland) K Drzewiecki (Finland) P Niklas-Salminen	6	6
(France) K Jacquet (France) C Tabur	7^{7}	1	[2]
2	(India) S Balaji (India) J Nedunchezhiyan	6^{4}	6	[10]

Semifinals
1	(Austria) A Erler (Austria) L Miedler	6	7^{7}
3	(Austria) M Neuchrist (Austria) T-S Weissborn	3	6^{4}
4	(Poland) K Drzewiecki (Finland) P Niklas-Salminen	4	6	[11]
2	(India) S Balaji (India) J Nedunchezhiyan	6	4	[9]

Final
1	(Austria) A Erler (Austria) L Miedler	7^{7}	6
4	(Poland) K Drzewiecki (Finland) P Niklas-Salminen	6^{3}	1
