= 2025 Challenger Santa Fe =

- Date: 9 – 15 June
- Edition: 4th
- Surface: Clay
- Location: Santa Fe, Argentina

Champions

Singles
- (Brazil) João Lucas Reis da Silva

Doubles
- (Argentina) Mariano Kestelboim / (Argentina) Gonzalo Villanueva
- Challenger Santa Fe

The 2025 Challenger Santa Fe, known as AAT Challenger Santander edición Santa Fe, was a professional tennis tournament played on clay courts. It was the fourth edition of the tournament which was part of the 2025 ATP Challenger Tour. It took place in Santa Fe, Argentina between 9 and 15 June 2025.

== Singles main-draw entrants ==
=== Seeds ===
Country	Player	Rank^{1}	Seed
ECU	Álvaro Guillén Meza	179	1
ARG	Santiago Rodríguez Taverna	195	2
ARG	Andrea Collarini	203	3
BRA	Matheus Pucinelli de Almeida	281	4
ARG	Juan Bautista Torres	290	5
ARG	Genaro Alberto Olivieri	291	6
ARG	Lautaro Midón	317	7
BRA	Pedro Sakamoto	322	8

- ^{1} Rankings are as of 26 May 2025.

=== Other entrants ===
The following players received wildcards into the singles main draw:

- (Argentina) Facundo Bagnis
- (Argentina) Thiago Cigarrán
- (Argentina) Renzo Olivo

The following players received entry into the singles main draw as alternates:

- (Peru) Conner Huertas del Pino
- (United States) Bruno Kuzuhara

The following players received entry from the qualifying draw:

- (Uruguay) Joaquín Aguilar Cardozo
- (United States) Dali Blanch
- (Germany) Lucas Gerch
- (Brazil) Igor Gimenez
- (Brazil) Wilson Leite
- (Argentina) Lorenzo Joaquín Rodríguez

The following players received entry as lucky losers:

- (Spain) Diego Augusto Barreto Sánchez
- (Germany) John Sperle

== Champions ==
=== Singles ===
- (Brazil) João Lucas Reis da Silva def. (Argentina) Lautaro Midón 6–4, 6–3.

=== Doubles ===
- (Argentina) Mariano Kestelboim / (Argentina) Gonzalo Villanueva def. (Argentina) Santiago de la Fuente / (Argentina) Genaro Alberto Olivieri 6–1, 2–6, [11–9].
