= 2023 Challenger Santa Fe =

- Date: 3 – 9 July
- Edition: 1st
- Surface: Clay
- Location: Santa Fe, Argentina

Champions

Singles
- (Argentina) Mariano Navone

Doubles
- (United States) Vasil Kirkov / (Chile) Matías Soto
- Challenger Santa Fe

The 2023 Challenger Santa Fe was a professional tennis tournament played on clay courts. It was the first edition of the tournament which was part of the 2023 ATP Challenger Tour. It took place in Santa Fe, Argentina between 3 and 9 July 2023.

== Singles main-draw entrants ==
=== Seeds ===
Country	Player	Rank^{1}	Seed
ARG	Mariano Navone	190	1
ARG	Santiago Rodríguez Taverna	228	2
ARG	Román Andrés Burruchaga	238	3
ARG	Francisco Comesaña	242	4
BRA	Gustavo Heide	338	5
BRA	Eduardo Ribeiro	344	6
~~PER~~	~~Nicolás Álvarez~~	~~405~~	~~7~~
BRA	Pedro Boscardin Dias	414	8
ARG	Matías Franco Descotte	426	9

- ^{1} Rankings are as of 26 June 2023.

=== Other entrants ===
The following players received wildcards into the singles main draw:

- (Argentina) Alejo Lorenzo Lingua Lavallén
- (Argentina) ~~Juan Ignacio Londero~~
- (Argentina) Lucio Ratti

The following players received entry into the singles main draw as alternates:

- (United States) Preston Brown
- (Argentina) Juan Manuel La Serna

The following players received entry from the qualifying draw:

- (Argentina) Lautaro Corthey
- (Brazil) Igor Gimenez
- (Ecuador) Álvaro Guillén Meza
- (Argentina) Luciano Tacchi
- (Paraguay) Daniel Vallejo
- (Chile) Nicolás Villalón

The following player received entry as a lucky loser:

- (Uruguay) Ignacio Carou

== Champions ==
=== Singles ===
- (Argentina) Mariano Navone def. (Paraguay) Daniel Vallejo 6–2, 6–4.

=== Doubles ===
- (United States) Vasil Kirkov / (Chile) Matías Soto def. (Uruguay) Ignacio Carou / (Argentina) Ignacio Monzón 7–6^{(7–3)}, 6–2.
