= Facundo Mena =

Argentine tennis player

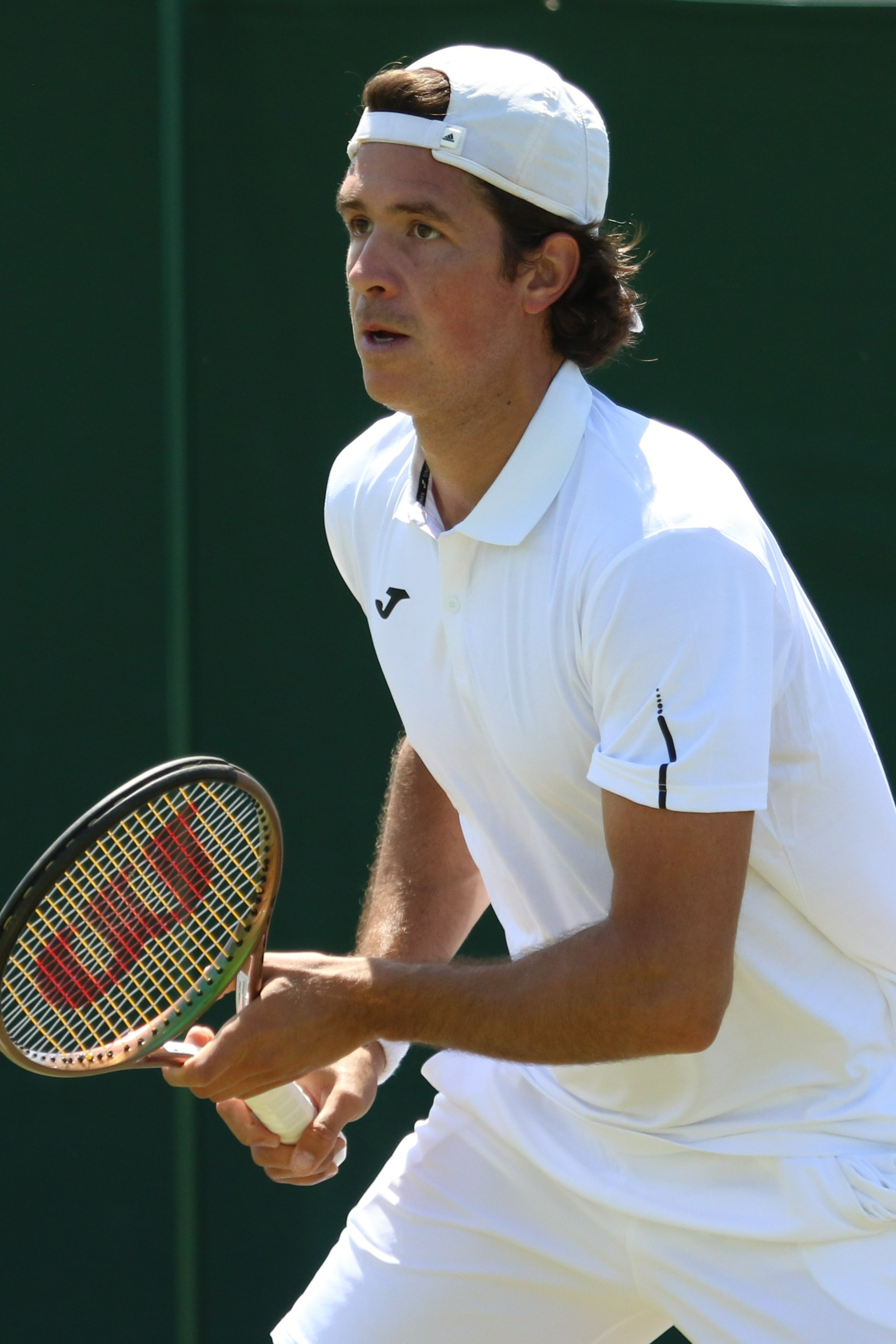
- Mena at the 2022 Wimbledon Championships
- Country (sports): Argentina
- Born: 22 September 1992 (age 34) Buenos Aires, Argentina
- Height: 1.83 m (6 ft 0 in)
- Plays: Right-handed (two-handed backhand)
- Coach: Guillermo Gomez, Ignacio Jojot
- Prize money: US $793,295

Singles
- Career record: 0–1
- Career titles: 0
- Highest ranking: No. 127 (12 September 2022)
- Current ranking: No. 196 (2 October 2026)

Grand Slam singles results
- Australian Open: Q1 (2020, 2021, 2022, 2023, 2025)
- French Open: Q2 (2020, 2022)
- Wimbledon: Q2 (2022)
- US Open: Q2 (2022)

Doubles
- Career record: 1–1
- Career titles: 0
- Highest ranking: No. 150 (20 April 2026)
- Current ranking: No. 170 (13 July 2026)
- Last updated on: 8 October 2026.

Facundo Mena (born 22 September 1992) is an Argentine professional tennis player. He has a career-high ATP singles ranking of world No. 127 achieved on 12 September 2022 and a best doubles ranking of No. 150 achieved on 20 April 2026.

Mena plays mostly on ATP Challenger Tour, where he won four titles in singles and five in doubles.

== ATP Challenger Tour finals ==
=== Singles: 12 (5 titles, 7 runner-ups) ===
Finals by surface
Hard (0–0)
Clay (5–7)

Result	W–L	Date	Tournament	Tier	Surface	Opponent	Score
Win	1–0	Sep 2019	Città di Como Challenger, Italy	Challenger	Clay	(Slovakia) Andrej Martin	2–6, 6–4, 6–1
Win	2–0	Sep 2021	Quito Challenger, Ecuador	Challenger	Clay	(Chile) Gonzalo Lama	6–4, 6–4
Loss	2–1	Sep 2021	Open Bogotá, Colombia	Challenger	Clay	(Austria) Gerald Melzer	2–6, 6–3, 6–7^{(5–7)}
Loss	2–2	Mar 2022	Pereira Challenger, Colombia	Challenger	Clay	(Argentina) Facundo Bagnis	3–6, 0–6
Win	3–2	Jul 2022	Cali Open, Colombia	Challenger	Clay	(Serbia) Miljan Zekić	6–2, 7–6^{(7–3)}
Loss	3–3	Jun 2024	Challenger Santa Fe, Argentina	Challenger	Clay	(Argentina) Andrea Collarini	2–6, 3–6
Loss	3–4	Jun 2024	Ibagué Open, Colombia	Challenger	Clay	(Ecuador) Álvaro Guillén Meza	0–6, 4–6
Win	4–4	Aug 2024	Open Bogotá, Colombia	Challenger	Clay	(Brazil) Mateus Alves	6–4, 7–5
Loss	4–5	Feb 2025	Brasil Tennis Challenger, Brazil	Challenger	Clay	(Argentina) Román Andrés Burruchaga	6–7^{(10–8)}, 7–6^{(8–6)}, 6–7^{(7–4)}
Loss	4–6	Aug 2026	Schwaben Open, Germany	Challenger	Clay	(Romania) Cezar Crețu	2–6, 0–6
Win	5–6	Aug 2026	CT Porto Cup, Portugal	Challenger	Clay	(Bolivia) Hugo Dellien	7–6^{(7–4)}, 6–4
Loss	5–7	Sep 2026	Challenger de Buenos Aires, Argentina	Challenger	Clay	(Argentina) Alex Barrena	4–6, 0–6

=== Doubles: 15 (7 titles, 8 runner-ups) ===
Finals by surface
Hard (0–0)
Clay (7–8)

Result	W–L	Date	Tournament	Tier	Surface	Partner	Opponents	Score
Loss	0–1	Sep 2019	Banja Luka Challenger, Bosnia and Herzegovina	Challenger	Clay	(Peru) Sergio Galdós	(France) Fabien Reboul (France) Sadio Doumbia	3–6, 6–7^{(4–7)}
Win	1–1	Jul 2021	Tampere Open, Finland	Challenger	Clay	(Argentina) Pedro Cachín	(Brazil) Orlando Luz (Brazil) Felipe Meligeni Alves	7–5, 6–3
Loss	1–2	Jul 2021	Challenger de Santiago, Chile	Challenger	Clay	(Argentina) Pedro Cachín	(Ecuador) Diego Hidalgo (Colombia) Cristian Rodríguez	4–6, 4–6
Win	2–2	Aug 2022	Lima Challenger, Peru	Challenger	Clay	(Uruguay) Ignacio Carou	(Brazil) Orlando Luz (Argentina) Camilo Ugo Carabelli	6–2, 6–2
Loss	2–3	Jun 2024	Challenger Santa Fe, Argentina	Challenger	Clay	(Uruguay) Ignacio Carou	(Lebanon) Hady Habib (United States) Trey Hilderbrand	7–6^{(7–5)}, 2–6, [4–10]
Win	3–3	Sep 2024	Buenos Aires Challenger, Argentina	Challenger	Clay	(Bolivia) Murkel Dellien	(Brazil) Felipe Meligeni Alves (Brazil) Marcelo Zormann	1–6, 6–2, [12–10]
Loss	3–4	Oct 2024	Internacional de Campinas, Brazil	Challenger	Clay	(Chile) Tomás Barrios Vera	(Brazil) Orlando Luz (Brazil) Mateus Alves	3–6, 4–6
Loss	3–5	Jan 2025	Punta Open, Uruguay	Challenger	Clay	(Argentina) Marco Trungelliti	(Brazil) Gustavo Heide (Brazil) João Lucas Reis da Silva	2–6, 3–6
Win	4–5	May 2025	Abruzzo Open, Italy	Challenger	Clay	(Venezuela) Luis David Martínez	(France) Théo Arribagé (France) Grégoire Jacq	7–5, 2–6, [10–6]
Win	5–5	Nov 2025	Uruguay Open, Uruguay	Challenger	Clay	(Mexico) Rodrigo Pacheco Méndez	(Ecuador) Gonzalo Escobar (Mexico) Miguel Ángel Reyes-Varela	3–6, 6–3, [11–9]
Win	6–5	Feb 2026	Rosario Challenger, Argentina	Challenger	Clay	(Uruguay) Ignacio Carou	(Mexico) Miguel Ángel Reyes-Varela (Brazil) Fernando Romboli	6–1, 6–4
Loss	6–6	Mar 2026	Banorte Tennis Open, Mexico	Challenger	Clay	(Mexico) Rodrigo Pacheco Méndez	(Australia) Jake Delaney (Australia) Tristan Schoolkate	4–6, 6–7^{(2–7)}
Loss	6–7	Jul 2026	Open Bogotá, Colombia	Challenger	Clay	(Ecuador) Gonzalo Escobar	(Chile) Matías Soto (Bolivia) Federico Zeballos	4–6, 6–2, [9–11]
Loss	6–8	Aug 2026	Open de Sion, Switzerland	Challenger	Clay	(Bolivia) Murkel Dellien	(Austria) Maximilian Neuchrist (Czech Republic) David Poljak	4–6, 4–6
Win	7–8	Nov 2026	Lima Challenger, Peru	Challenger	Clay	(Argentina) Facundo Bagnis	(Poland) Karol Drzewiecki (Poland) Piotr Matuszewski	4–6, 6–4, [10–3]

== ITF Futures/World Tennis Tour finals ==
=== Singles: 30 (12 titles, 18 runner-ups) ===
Finals by surface
Hard (2–4)
Clay (10–14)

Result	W–L	Date	Tournament	Tier	Surface	Opponent	Score
Loss	0–1	Aug 2011	Argentina F12, Neuquén	Futures	Clay	(Argentina) Juan-Pablo Villar	5–7, 4–6
Win	1–1	Oct 2011	Bolivia F4, Sucre	Futures	Clay	(Argentina) Juan Ignacio Amarante	4–6, 6–3, 6–4
Win	2–1	Oct 2012	Bolivia F5, Santa Cruz de la Sierra	Futures	Clay	(Argentina) Joaquín-Jesús Monteferrario	6–1, 6–2
Loss	2–2	Jul 2013	Argentina F11, Corrientes	Futures	Clay	(Argentina) Andrea Collarini	1–6, 4–6
Loss	2–3	Aug 2013	Argentina F14, San Francisco	Futures	Clay	(Argentina) Tomás Lipovšek Puches	3–6, 2–6
Loss	2–4	Oct 2013	Chile F5, Santiago	Futures	Clay	(Chile) Gonzalo Lama	2–6, 1–6
Loss	2–5	Oct 2013	Chile F6, Santiago	Futures	Clay	(Chile) Juan Carlos Sáez	4–6, 2–6
Loss	2–6	Dec 2013	Brazil F18, Foz do Iguaçu	Futures	Clay	(Brazil) Rafael Camilo	5–7, 3–6
Loss	2–7	May 2014	USA F12, Vero Beach	Futures	Clay	(United States) Connor Smith	2–6, 4–6
Loss	2–8	May 2015	USA F14, Vero Beach	Futures	Clay	(United States) Wil Spencer	3–6, 4–6
Loss	2–9	May 2015	Colombia F3, Pereira	Futures	Clay	(Brazil) Wilson Leite	6–2, 6–7^{(11–13)}, 3–6
Win	3–9	Jul 2015	Colombia F5, Cali	Futures	Clay	(Colombia) Alejandro Gómez	6–1, 6–2
Loss	3–10	Dec 2015	Dominican Republic F3, Santo Domingo	Futures	Hard	(United States) Sekou Bangoura	7–6^{(8–6)}, 3–6, 2–6
Loss	3–11	Jun 2016	Colombia F2, Barranquilla	Futures	Clay	(Dominican Republic) Roberto Cid Subervi	1–6, 2–6
Loss	3–12	Jul 2016	USA F24, Godfrey	Futures	Hard	(United States) Tennys Sandgren	0–6, 4–6
Loss	3–13	Dec 2016	Uruguay F2, Paysandu	Futures	Clay	(Austria) Michael Linzer	0–6, 3–6
Win	4–13	May 2017	USA F16, Tampa	Futures	Clay	(Japan) Kaichi Uchida	6–4, 6–7^{(4–7)}, 6–0
Loss	4–14	Jul 2017	Hungary F4, Gyula	Futures	Clay	(France) Constant Lestienne	5–7, 4–6
Win	5–14	Nov 2018	Chile F2, Santiago	Futures	Clay	(Chile) Bastian Malla	6–4, 6–4
Win	6–14	Dec 2018	Chile F3, Antofagasta	Futures	Clay	(Argentina) Gabriel Alejandro Hidalgo	6–1, 4–6, 6–1
Win	7–14	Mar 2019	M15 Cancún, Mexico	WTT	Hard	(Ecuador) Diego Hidalgo	6–2, 6–4
Win	8–14	Mar 2019	M15 Cancún, Mexico	WTT	Hard	(Peru) Juan Pablo Varillas	4–6, 6–3, 6–1
Loss	8–15	Nov 2023	M15 Santo Domingo, Dominican Republic	WTT	Hard	(United States) Bruno Kuzuhara	5–7, 5–7
Loss	8–16	Nov 2023	M15 Santo Domingo, Dominican Republic	WTT	Hard	(United States) Bruno Kuzuhara	1–6, 0–6
Win	9–16	Dec 2023	M15 Concepción, Chile	WTT	Clay	(Argentina) Nicolás Kicker	7–6^{(7–4)}, 6–1
Loss	9–17	Dec 2023	M15 Concepción, Chile	WTT	Clay	(Argentina) Gonzalo Villanueva	3–6, 4–6
Loss	9–18	Feb 2024	M15 Villa María, Argentina	WTT	Clay	(Argentina) Mariano Kestelboim	3–6, 0–6
Win	10–18	Apr 2024	M15 Santiago, Chile	WTT	Clay	(Argentina) Fermín Tenti	6–2, 6–3
Win	11–18	Jul 2024	M15 Telfs, Austria	WTT	Clay	(Austria) Lukas Neumayer	6–4, 6–2
Win	12–18	Jan 2026	M15 Santiago, Chile	WTT	Clay	(Chile) Matías Soto	6–4, 6–4

=== Doubles: 29 (14 titles, 15 runner-ups) ===
Finals by surface
Hard (3–1)
Clay (11–14)

Result	W–L	Date	Tournament	Tier	Surface	Partner	Opponents	Score
Loss	0–1	Jul 2011	Chile F5, Iquique	Futures	Clay	(Argentina) Federico Coria	(Argentina) Gustavo Sterin (Argentina) Patricio Heras	4–6, 6–7^{(4–7)}
Loss	0–2	Aug 2011	Argentina F10, Buenos Aires	Futures	Clay	(Argentina) Guillermo Carry	(Argentina) Guillermo Bujniewicz (Argentina) Alejandro Fabbri	6–4, 3–6, [8-10]
Win	1–2	Jul 2012	Peru F3, Lima	Futures	Clay	(Argentina) Juan Pablo Ortiz	(Brazil) Nicolas Santos (Brazil) Ricardo Siggia	6–1, 6–3
Win	2–2	Sep 2012	Bolivia F2, Trinidad	Futures	Clay	(Venezuela) Sebastian Serrano	(Bolivia) Hugo Dellien (Bolivia) Murkel Dellien	6–3, 7–5
Win	3–2	Sep 2012	Bolivia F3, La Paz	Futures	Clay	(Peru) Rodrigo Sánchez	(Guatemala) Christopher Díaz Figueroa (Venezuela) Sebastian Serrano	7–6^{(7–5)}, 7–6^{(8–6)}
Win	4–2	Dec 2012	Argentina F27, Buenos Aires	Futures	Clay	(Argentina) Leandro Migani	(Argentina) Juan Ignacio Londero (Argentina) Mateo Nicolás Martínez	6–3, 6–3
Win	5–2	Jul 2013	Argentina F11, Corrientes	Futures	Clay	(Ecuador) Iván Endara	(Argentina) Joaquín-Jesús Monteferrario (Argentina) Patricio Heras	6–3, 6–3
Win	6–2	Sep 2013	Argentina F18, Neuquén	Futures	Clay	(Italy) Stefano Travaglia	(Argentina) Juan Pablo Ficovich (Colombia) Juan Manuel Benítez Chavarriaga	6–7^{(5–7)}, 6–1, [10-8]
Loss	6–3	Oct 2013	Chile F5, Santiago	Futures	Clay	(Argentina) Francisco Bahamonde	(Chile) Víctor Núñez (Chile) Jorge Aguilar	2–6, 7–6^{(7–2)}, [4-10]
Loss	6–4	Nov 2013	Brazil F16, Itajubá	Futures	Clay	(Brazil) Gustavo Guerses	(Brazil) Pedro Sakamoto (Brazil) Alexandre Tsuchiya	5–7, 7–6^{(7–1)}, [8-10]
Loss	6–5	Dec 2013	Brazil F18, Foz do Iguaçu	Futures	Clay	(Argentina) Joaquín-Jesús Monteferrario	(Brazil) Wilson Leite (Sweden) Cristian Lindell	6–4, 4–6, [10-12]
Win	7–5	Mar 2014	Argentina F5, Rosario	Futures	Clay	(Bolivia) Hugo Dellien	(Brazil) Leonardo Kirche (Brazil) André Miele	6–4, 0–6, [10–5]
Loss	7–6	Aug 2014	Colombia F3, Medellín	Futures	Clay	(United States) Cătălin Gârd	(El Salvador) Marcelo Arévalo (Mexico) César Ramírez	4–6, 4–6
Loss	7–7	Nov 2014	Colombia F7, Manizales	Futures	Clay	(Argentina) Mateo Nicolás Martínez	(Colombia) Nicolás Barrientos (Colombia) Eduardo Struvay	5–7, 6–2, [5–10]
Win	8–7	Dec 2014	Argentina F20, Mendoza	Futures	Clay	(Argentina) Mateo Nicolás Martínez	(Chile) Jorge Aguilar (Chile) Cristian Garín	7–6^{(7–4)}, 6–4
Loss	8–8	May 2015	USA F15, Orange Park	Futures	Clay	(Argentina) Maximiliano Estévez	(United States) Jean-Yves Aubone (New Zealand) Ben Mclachlan	4–6, 4–6
Win	9–8	Jul 2015	Colombia F4, Popayán	Futures	Hard	(Chile) Jorge Montero	(Mexico) Manuel Sánchez (Colombia) Steffen Zormosa	7–6^{(7–2)}, 6–2
Loss	9–9	Aug 2015	Colombia F6, Medellín	Futures	Clay	(Chile) Jorge Montero	(Colombia) Nicolás Barrientos (Colombia) Eduardo Struvay	3–6, 5–7
Win	10–9	Aug 2015	Colombia F7, Bucaramanga	Futures	Clay	(Chile) Jorge Montero	(Colombia) Nicolás Barrientos (Colombia) Juan Montes	6–2, 6–2
Loss	10–10	Nov 2015	Colombia F8, Bogotá	Futures	Clay	(Colombia) Juan Sebastián Gómez	(Colombia) Cristian Rodríguez (Colombia) Mateo Andrés Ruiz Naranjo	6–7^{(3–7)}, 3–6
Loss	10–11	Dec 2015	Dominican Republic F2, Santo Domingo	Futures	Clay	(Argentina) Juan Ignacio Galarza	(South Africa) Keith-Patrick Crowley (United States) Max Schnur	6–4, 4–6, [5–10]
Win	11–11	Jun 2016	Colombia F1, Cartagena	Futures	Hard	(Chile) Jorge Montero	(Colombia) Jose Daniel Bendeck (Colombia) Nicolás Mejía	6–4, 7-6^{(7–5)}
Loss	11–12	Jul 2016	USA F24, Godfrey	Futures	Hard	(Venezuela) Jesús Bandrés	(United States) Nathan Ponwith (United States) Emil Reinberg	3–6, 4–6
Loss	11–13	Jun 2017	Italy F16, Padova	Futures	Clay	(Argentina) Franco Agamenone	(Italy) Andrea Vavassori (Italy) Julian Ocleppo	6–4, 1–6, [8–10]
Win	12–13	Jul 2017	Colombia F2, Manizales	Futures	Clay	(Argentina) Camilo Ugo Carabelli	(Argentina) Facundo Arguello (Argentina) Gonzalo Villanueva	6–3, 1–6, [10–4]
Win	13–13	Oct 2018	Brazil F2, Mogi das Cruzes	Futures	Clay	(Brazil) Rafael Matos	(Brazil) Daniel Dutra da Silva (Brazil) Eduardo Russi	6–1, 6–2
Loss	13–14	Jun 2019	M25+H Arion, Belgium	WTT	Clay	(Belgium) Martin Van Der Meerschen	(Sweden) Markus Eriksson (Belgium) Jeroen Vanneste	2–6, 2–6
Loss	13–15	Jul 2019	M25 Lasne, Belgium	WTT	Clay	(Peru) Sergio Galdós	(United States) Hunter Johnson (United States) Yates Johnson	3–6, 6–7^{(5–7)}
Win	14–15	May 2023	M25 Xalapa, Mexico	WTT	Hard	(Ecuador) Andrés Andrade	(Canada) Juan Carlos Aguilar (Peru) Jorge Panta	7–6^{(7–3)}, 6–3
