= Challenger Santa Fe =

Tennis tournament in Chile

- 2024 Challenger Santa Fe

ATP Challenger Tour
- Event name: Challenger Santa Fe
- Location: Santa Fe, Argentina
- Category: ATP Challenger Tour
- Surface: Clay
- Prize money: $41,000 (2024)
- Website: Website

The Challenger Santa Fe is a professional tennis tournament played on clay courts. It is currently part of the ATP Challenger Tour. It was first held in Santa Fe, Argentina, in 2023.

== Past finals ==
=== Singles ===
Year	Champion	Runner-up	Score
2025	(Brazil) João Lucas Reis da Silva	(Argentina) Lautaro Midón	6–4, 6–3
2024	(Argentina) Andrea Collarini	(Argentina) Facundo Mena	6–2, 6–3
2023 (2)	(Argentina) Mariano Navone	(Italy) Andrea Pellegrino	3–6, 6–2, 6–3
2023 (1)	(Argentina) Mariano Navone	(Paraguay) Daniel Vallejo	6–2, 6–4

=== Doubles ===
Year	Champions	Runners-up	Score
2025	(Argentina) Mariano Kestelboim (Argentina) Gonzalo Villanueva	(Argentina) Santiago de la Fuente (Argentina) Genaro Alberto Olivieri	6–1, 2–6, [11–9]
2024	(Lebanon) Hady Habib (United States) Trey Hilderbrand	(Uruguay) Ignacio Carou (Argentina) Facundo Mena	6–7^{(5–7)}, 6–2, [10–4]
2023 (2)	(Switzerland) Luca Margaroli (Argentina) Santiago Rodríguez Taverna	(Italy) Franco Agamenone (Argentina) Mariano Kestelboim	7–6^{(7–2)}, 6–4
2023 (1)	(United States) Vasil Kirkov (Chile) Matías Soto	(Uruguay) Ignacio Carou (Argentina) Ignacio Monzón	7–6^{(7–3)}, 6–2
