= 2021 Zadar Open – Singles =

Singles
- 2021 Zadar Open

Final
- Champion: (Serbia) Nikola Milojević
- Runner-up: (Bulgaria) Dimitar Kuzmanov
- Score: 2–6, 6–2, 7–6^{(7–5)}

Events
Singles	Doubles
Zadar Open	· 2022 →

This was the first edition of the tournament.

Nikola Milojević won the title after defeating Dimitar Kuzmanov 2–6, 6–2, 7–6^{(7–5)} in the final.

== Seeds ==
1. (Italy) Gianluca Mager (quarterfinals)
2. (India) Sumit Nagal (quarterfinals)
3. (Serbia) Nikola Milojević (champion)
4. (Slovenia) Blaž Rola (first round)
5. (Italy) Alessandro Giannessi (second round)
6. (Slovakia) Filip Horanský (first round)
7. (France) Enzo Couacaud (first round)
8. (Italy) Gian Marco Moroni (first round)

== Draw ==
=== Key ===
- Q = Qualifier
- WC = Wild card
- LL = Lucky loser
- Alt = Alternate
- SE = Special exempt
- PR = Protected ranking
- ITF = ITF entry
- JE = Junior exempt
- w/o = Walkover
- r = Retired
- d = Defaulted
- SR = Special ranking

=== Finals ===
Semifinals
(Slovakia) Lukáš Klein	4	6	2
3	(Serbia) Nikola Milojević	6	4	6
(Bulgaria) Dimitar Kuzmanov	6	2
Q	(Bosnia and Herzegovina) Nerman Fatić	2	0^{r}

Final
3	(Serbia) Nikola Milojević	2	6	7^{7}
(Bulgaria) Dimitar Kuzmanov	6	2	6^{5}

=== Top half ===
First round
1	(Italy) G Mager	6	4	6
(Netherlands) I Sijsling	4	6	4
Q	(Spain) N Sánchez Izquierdo	3	6	6
WC	(Croatia) M Pecotić	6	3	2
LL	(Ukraine) V Orlov	1	2
(Slovakia) L Klein	6	6
(Czech Republic) M Vrbenský	6	6
7	(France) E Couacaud	3	2
3	(Serbia) N Milojević	7^{7}	6
(Chinese Taipei) T-l Wu	6^{4}	1
(Russia) T Gabashvili	2	6	3
LL	(Russia) I Nedelko	6	2	6
Q	(Italy) M Bortolotti	1	3
(Czech Republic) V Kopřiva	6	6
Q	(Belarus) U Ignatik	6	6
6	(Slovakia) F Horanský	1	3

Second round
1	(Italy) G Mager	1	6	6
Q	(Spain) N Sánchez Izquierdo	6	4	1
(Slovakia) L Klein	5	6	6
(Czech Republic) M Vrbenský	7	3	1
3	(Serbia) N Milojević	6	6
LL	(Russia) I Nedelko	2	1
(Czech Republic) V Kopřiva	2	6	6
Q	(Belarus) U Ignatik	6	1	3

Quarterfinals
1	(Italy) G Mager	4	6	4
(Slovakia) L Klein	6	4	6
3	(Serbia) N Milojević	7	6
(Czech Republic) V Kopřiva	5	4

Semifinals
(Slovakia) L Klein	4	6	2
3	(Serbia) N Milojević	6	4	6

=== Bottom half ===
First round
8	(Italy) GM Moroni	4	4
(Bulgaria) D Kuzmanov	6	6
(Czech Republic) Z Kolář	6	6
(Russia) A Vatutin	4	2
(Slovenia) B Kavčič	6	6
(Italy) A Pellegrino	3	1
(Slovakia) A Molčan	6	6
4	(Slovenia) B Rola	4	4
5	(Italy) A Giannessi	7	7
(Italy) R Bonadio	5	5
Q	(Bosnia and Herzegovina) N Fatić	6	6
Alt	(Australia) H Bourchier	2	4
WC	(Croatia) F Ninčević	4	6	6
WC	(Croatia) M Poljičak	6	4	3
(Croatia) N Serdarušić	6^{4}	4
2	(India) S Nagal	7^{7}	6

Second round
(Bulgaria) D Kuzmanov	6	6
(Czech Republic) Z Kolář	4	3
(Slovenia) B Kavčič	6	6
(Slovakia) A Molčan	2	1
5	(Italy) A Giannessi	6^{4}	7	6^{6}
Q	(Bosnia and Herzegovina) N Fatić	7^{7}	5	7^{8}
WC	(Croatia) F Ninčević	0	1
2	(India) S Nagal	6	6

Quarterfinals
(Bulgaria) D Kuzmanov	6	6
(Slovenia) B Kavčič	4	1
Q	(Bosnia and Herzegovina) N Fatić	5	6	7
2	(India) S Nagal	7	3	5

Semifinals
(Bulgaria) D Kuzmanov	6	2
Q	(Bosnia and Herzegovina) N Fatić	2	0^{r}
