= 2023 Zadar Open – Doubles =

Doubles
- 2023 Zadar Open

Final
- Champions: (France) Manuel Guinard (Croatia) Nino Serdarušić
- Runners-up: (Serbia) Ivan Sabanov (Serbia) Matej Sabanov
- Score: 6–4, 6–0

Events
Singles	Doubles
← 2022 ·	Zadar Open	· 2024 →

Zdeněk Kolář and Andrea Vavassori were the defending champions but chose not to defend their title.

Manuel Guinard and Nino Serdarušić won the title after defeating Ivan and Matej Sabanov 6–4, 6–0 in the final.

== Seeds ==
1. (Czech Republic) Roman Jebavý / (Czech Republic) Adam Pavlásek (first round)
2. (Serbia) Ivan Sabanov / (Serbia) Matej Sabanov (final)
3. Ivan Liutarevich / (Ukraine) Vladyslav Manafov (semifinals)
4. (Ukraine) Denys Molchanov / (Croatia) Mili Poljičak (quarterfinals)

== Draw ==
=== Key ===
- Q = Qualifier
- WC = Wild card
- LL = Lucky loser
- Alt = Alternate
- SE = Special exempt
- PR = Protected ranking
- ITF = ITF entry
- JE = Junior exempt
- w/o = Walkover
- r = Retired
- d = Defaulted
- SR = Special ranking

First round
1	(Czech Republic) R Jebavý (Czech Republic) A Pavlásek	5	2
(France) T Arribagé (France) T Droguet	7	6
WC	(Bosnia and Herzegovina) M Bašić (Bosnia and Herzegovina) D Džumhur	6	7^{7}
(Croatia) Z Babić (Poland) P Matuszewski	4	6^{5}
(Czech Republic) V Kopřiva (Czech Republic) J Pospíšil	1	5
(France) M Guinard (Croatia) N Serdarušić	6	7
(Austria) S Ofner (United Kingdom) R Peniston	4	2
3	I Liutarevich (Ukraine) V Manafov	6	6
(Romania) FC Jianu (Slovakia) J Kovalík	3	6	[7]
WC	(Croatia) D Ajduković (Croatia) F Ninčević	6	3	[10]
(Latvia) M Lībietis (Switzerland) L Margaroli	2	6	[4]
2	(Serbia) I Sabanov (Serbia) M Sabanov	6	4	[10]

Quarterfinals
(France) T Arribagé (France) T Droguet	2	6	[10]
WC	(Bosnia and Herzegovina) M Bašić (Bosnia and Herzegovina) D Džumhur	6	4	[6]
4	(Ukraine) D Molchanov (Croatia) M Poljičak	1	6^{4}
(France) M Guinard (Croatia) N Serdarušić	6	7^{7}
(Bosnia and Herzegovina) N Fatić (Serbia) H Međedović	6^{3}	6^{5}
3	I Liutarevich (Ukraine) V Manafov	7^{7}	7^{7}
WC	(Croatia) D Ajduković (Croatia) F Ninčević	1	2
2	(Serbia) I Sabanov (Serbia) M Sabanov	6	6

Semifinals
(France) T Arribagé (France) T Droguet	2	6	[8]
(France) M Guinard (Croatia) N Serdarušić	6	4	[10]
3	I Liutarevich (Ukraine) V Manafov	4	5
2	(Serbia) I Sabanov (Serbia) M Sabanov	6	7

Final
(France) M Guinard (Croatia) N Serdarušić	6	6
2	(Serbia) I Sabanov (Serbia) M Sabanov	4	0
