= 2023 Zadar Open – Singles =

Singles
- 2023 Zadar Open

Final
- Champion: (Italy) Alessandro Giannessi
- Runner-up: (Austria) Sebastian Ofner
- Score: 6–4, 5–7, 7–6^{(8–6)}

Events
| Singles | Doubles |
| ← 2022 · | Zadar Open | · 2024 → |

Flavio Cobolli was the defending champion but lost in the semifinals to Sebastian Ofner.

Alessandro Giannessi won the title after defeating Ofner 6–4, 5–7, 7–6^{(8–6)} in the final.

== Seeds ==
1. (Chinese Taipei) Tseng Chun-hsin (second round)
2. (Slovakia) Jozef Kovalík (second round)
3. (United Kingdom) Ryan Peniston (first round)
4. (Austria) Sebastian Ofner (final)
5. (Italy) Flavio Cobolli (semifinals)
6. (France) Laurent Lokoli (withdrew)
7. (Czech Republic) Vít Kopřiva (first round)
8. (France) Manuel Guinard (first round)

== Draw ==
=== Key ===
- Q = Qualifier
- WC = Wild card
- LL = Lucky loser
- Alt = Alternate
- SE = Special exempt
- PR = Protected ranking
- ITF = ITF entry
- JE = Junior exempt
- w/o = Walkover
- r = Retired
- d = Defaulted
- SR = Special ranking

=== Finals ===
Semifinals
5 | (Italy) Flavio Cobolli | 5 | 5
4 | (Austria) Sebastian Ofner | 7 | 7
(Italy) Alessandro Giannessi | 6 | 6
(France) Arthur Cazaux | 3 | 4

Final
4 | (Austria) Sebastian Ofner | 4 | 7 | 6^{6}
(Italy) Alessandro Giannessi | 6 | 5 | 7^{8}

=== Top half ===
First round
1 | (Chinese Taipei) C-h Tseng | 6 | 7
LL | (Serbia) N Milojević | 4 | 5
Q | (Italy) G Zeppieri | 6 | 6
Q | (Austria) D Pichler | 1 | 4
(Romania) FC Jianu | 1 | 6^{4}
(Bosnia and Herzegovina) D Džumhur | 6 | 7^{7}
WC | (Croatia) M Poljičak | 1 | 3
5 | (Italy) F Cobolli | 6 | 6
4 | (Austria) S Ofner | 7^{7} | 2 | 6
(Bosnia and Herzegovina) N Fatić | 6^{1} | 6 | 2
(Serbia) M Zekić | 6 | 3 | 2
(Sweden) DN Mădăraș | 2 | 6 | 6
Q | (Italy) J Ocleppo | 3 | 6 | 4
(Italy) M Gigante | 6 | 2 | 6
(Serbia) H Međedović | 6 | 6
7 | (Czech Republic) V Kopřiva | 4 | 2

Second round
1 | (Chinese Taipei) C-h Tseng | 6 | 1 | 4
Q | (Italy) G Zeppieri | 4 | 6 | 6
(Bosnia and Herzegovina) D Džumhur | 6 | 2 | 5
5 | (Italy) F Cobolli | 3 | 6 | 7
4 | (Austria) S Ofner | 1 | 7^{7} | 6
(Sweden) DN Mădăraș | 6 | 6^{3} | 4
(Italy) M Gigante | 6 | 6
(Serbia) H Međedović | 1 | 2

Quarterfinals
Q | (Italy) G Zeppieri | 6 | 2 | 1
5 | (Italy) F Cobolli | 3 | 6 | 6
4 | (Austria) S Ofner | 6 | 6
(Italy) M Gigante | 4 | 1

Semifinals
5 | (Italy) F Cobolli | 5 | 5
4 | (Austria) S Ofner | 7 | 7

=== Bottom half ===
First round
8 | (France) M Guinard | 4 | 2
(Italy) A Giannessi | 6 | 6
(Croatia) N Serdarušić | 6 | 6
(Italy) G Mager | 4 | 2
LL | (Italy) S Caruso | 3 | 7^{7} | 6
(Belgium) K Coppejans | 6 | 6^{4} | 1
(Hungary) Z Piros | 6 | 6
3 | (United Kingdom) R Peniston | 4 | 4
Q | (Italy) G Fonio | 6 | 4 | 2
(France) A Cazaux | 4 | 6 | 6
(France) T Droguet | 4 | 6 | 4
WC | (Croatia) D Ajduković | 6 | 3 | 6
WC | (Croatia) D Prižmić | 6 | 6
Q | (Bosnia and Herzegovina) M Bašić | 1 | 3
Q | (Germany) Jeremy Jahn | 7 | 3 | 2
2 | (Slovakia) J Kovalík | 5 | 6 | 6

Second round
(Italy) A Giannessi | 7^{7} | 6
(Croatia) N Serdarušić | 6^{4} | 3
LL | (Italy) S Caruso | 2 | 3
(Hungary) Z Piros | 6 | 6
(France) A Cazaux | 6 | 6
WC | (Croatia) D Ajduković | 3 | 4
WC | (Croatia) D Prižmić | 6 | 6
2 | (Slovakia) J Kovalík | 3 | 4

Quarterfinals
(Italy) A Giannessi | 7^{8} | 6
(Hungary) Z Piros | 6^{6} | 2
(France) A Cazaux | 6 | 6
WC | (Croatia) D Prižmić | 1 | 1

Semifinals
(Italy) A Giannessi | 6 | 6
(France) A Cazaux | 3 | 4
