= 2022 Zadar Open – Doubles =

Doubles
- 2022 Zadar Open

Final
- Champions: (Czech Republic) Zdeněk Kolář (Italy) Andrea Vavassori
- Runners-up: (Italy) Franco Agamenone (France) Manuel Guinard
- Score: 3–6, 7–6^{(9–7)}, [10–6]

Events
Singles	Doubles
← 2021 ·	Zadar Open	· 2023 →

Blaž Kavčič and Blaž Rola were the defending champions but chose not to defend their title.

Zdeněk Kolář and Andrea Vavassori won the title after defeating Franco Agamenone and Manuel Guinard 3–6, 7–6^{(9–7)}, [10–6] in the final.

== Seeds ==
1. (Ukraine) Denys Molchanov / (Kazakhstan) Aleksandr Nedovyesov (first round)
2. (Serbia) Ivan Sabanov / (Serbia) Matej Sabanov (quarterfinals)
3. (Czech Republic) Zdeněk Kolář / (Italy) Andrea Vavassori (champions)
4. (Italy) Marco Bortolotti / (France) Sadio Doumbia (semifinals)

== Draw ==
=== Key ===
- Q = Qualifier
- WC = Wild card
- LL = Lucky loser
- Alt = Alternate
- SE = Special exempt
- PR = Protected ranking
- ITF = ITF entry
- JE = Junior exempt
- w/o = Walkover
- r = Retired
- d = Defaulted
- SR = Special ranking

First round
1	(Ukraine) D Molchanov (Kazakhstan) A Nedovyesov	3	3
(Italy) F Agamenone (France) M Guinard	6	6
(Switzerland) L Castelnuovo (China) Zh Zhang	7^{7}	6
(Spain) J Barranco Cosano (Italy) R Brancaccio	6^{4}	3
4	(Italy) M Bortolotti (France) S Doumbia	6	6
PR	(India) J Nedunchezhiyan (India) VS Prashanth	2	3
(Italy) F Forti (Italy) G Zeppieri	6	6
(Uzbekistan) D Istomin (Czech Republic) L Rosol	2	3
(Serbia) N Milojević (Serbia) M Zekić	6	6^{5}	[8]
WC	(Croatia) D Ajduković (Croatia) F Ninčević	3	7^{7}	[10]
(Slovakia) A Martin (Austria) T-S Weissborn	6	4	[4]
3	(Czech Republic) Z Kolář (Italy) A Vavassori	3	6	[10]
WC	(Croatia) M Poljičak (Croatia) N Serdarušić	7^{7}	6
(Romania) A Jecan (Austria) D Pichler	6^{2}	1
(Uzbekistan) S Fayziev (Greece) M Kalovelonis	4	3
2	(Serbia) I Sabanov (Serbia) M Sabanov	6	6

Quarterfinals
(Italy) F Agamenone (France) M Guinard	6	7^{8}
(Switzerland) L Castelnuovo (China) Zh Zhang	3	6^{6}
4	(Italy) M Bortolotti (France) S Doumbia	6	4	[10]
(Italy) F Forti (Italy) G Zeppieri	3	6	[6]
WC	(Croatia) D Ajduković (Croatia) F Ninčević	3	3
3	(Czech Republic) Z Kolář (Italy) A Vavassori	6	6
WC	(Croatia) M Poljičak (Croatia) N Serdarušić	6	7
2	(Serbia) I Sabanov (Serbia) M Sabanov	4	5

Semifinals
(Italy) F Agamenone (France) M Guinard	6	6
4	(Italy) M Bortolotti (France) S Doumbia	4	4
3	(Czech Republic) Z Kolář (Italy) A Vavassori	6	6
WC	(Croatia) M Poljičak (Croatia) N Serdarušić	4	4

Final
(Italy) F Agamenone (France) M Guinard	6	6^{7}	[6]
3	(Czech Republic) Z Kolář (Italy) A Vavassori	3	7^{9}	[10]
