= 2025 Zadar Open – Singles =

Singles
- 2025 Zadar Open

Final
- Champion: (Croatia) Borna Ćorić
- Runner-up: (France) Valentin Royer
- Score: 3–6, 6–2, 6–3

Events
Singles	Doubles
← 2024 ·	Zadar Open	· 2026 →

Jozef Kovalík was the defending champion but lost in the quarterfinals to Enrico Dalla Valle.

Borna Ćorić won the title after defeating Valentin Royer 3–6, 6–2, 6–3 in the final.

== Seeds ==
1. (Bosnia and Herzegovina) Damir Džumhur (semifinals, retired)
2. (Czech Republic) Vít Kopřiva (first round)
3. (Croatia) Borna Ćorić (champion)
4. (Slovakia) Jozef Kovalík (quarterfinals)
5. (France) Valentin Royer (final)
6. (Czech Republic) Dalibor Svrčina (second round, retired)
7. (Croatia) Duje Ajduković (first round)
8. (Germany) Henri Squire (first round)

== Draw ==
=== Key ===
- Q = Qualifier
- WC = Wild card
- LL = Lucky loser
- Alt = Alternate
- ITF = ITF entry
- PR = Protected ranking
- SR = Special ranking
- SE = Special exempt
- JE = Junior exempt
- JR = Junior Accelerator Programme entrant
- CO = College Accelerator Programme entrant
- NG = Next Gen Accelerator Program entrant
- w/o = Walkover
- r = Retired
- d = Defaulted

=== Finals ===
Semifinals
1	(Bosnia and Herzegovina) Damir Džumhur	4	0^{r}
3	(Croatia) Borna Ćorić	6	1
Alt	(Italy) Enrico Dalla Valle	2	1
5	(France) Valentin Royer	6	6

Final
3	(Croatia) Borna Ćorić	3	6	6
5	(France) Valentin Royer	6	2	3

=== Top half ===
First round
1	(Bosnia and Herzegovina) D Džumhur	7^{8}	2	6
Q	(Czech Republic) Z Kolář	6^{6}	6	2
(France) G Blancaneaux	1	5
Q	(France) L Pavlovic	6	7
WC	(Croatia) M Poljičak	6	4	7
Q	(Germany) M Topo	4	6	5
SE	(Bulgaria) D Kuzmanov	7^{9}	6
8	(Germany) H Squire	6^{7}	3
3	(Croatia) B Ćorić	7	6
(Argentina) P Cachin	5	1
Q	(Croatia) L Mikrut	7	6
(Italy) F Arnaboldi	5	4
Q	(Bosnia and Herzegovina) M Bašić	4	4
(Romania) FC Jianu	6	6
Q	(Slovakia) A Martin	1	1
6	(Czech Republic) D Svrčina	6	6

Second round
1	(Bosnia and Herzegovina) D Džumhur	6	6
Q	(France) L Pavlovic	3	4
WC	(Croatia) M Poljičak	6	6^{4}	7
SE	(Bulgaria) D Kuzmanov	0	7^{7}	5
3	(Croatia) B Ćorić	6	6
Q	(Croatia) L Mikrut	2	3
(Romania) FC Jianu	3	6	4
6	(Czech Republic) D Svrčina	6	4	2^{r}

Quarterfinals
1	(Bosnia and Herzegovina) D Džumhur	6	6
WC	(Croatia) M Poljičak	2	2
3	(Croatia) B Ćorić	7^{7}	6
(Romania) FC Jianu	6^{2}	3

Semifinals
1	(Bosnia and Herzegovina) D Džumhur	4	0^{r}
3	(Croatia) B Ćorić	6	1

=== Bottom half ===
First round
7	(Croatia) D Ajduković	6	3	4
(Italy) F Maestrelli	4	6	6
Alt	(Italy) E Dalla Valle	3	6	6
(Germany) MH Rehberg	6	3	1
(Hungary) Z Piros	7	6
(Austria) F Misolic	5	4
(Croatia) M Dodig	5	3
4	(Slovakia) J Kovalík	7	6
5	(France) V Royer	6	3	6
(Bulgaria) A Andreev	4	6	4
WC	(Croatia) D Prižmić	6	6
(Sweden) E Ymer	1	1
WC	(Bosnia and Herzegovina) N Fatić	6	7^{7}
(Kazakhstan) T Skatov	2	6^{3}
(Spain) C Sánchez Jover	6	2	6
2	(Czech Republic) V Kopřiva	2	6	3

Second round
(Italy) F Maestrelli	5	2
Alt	(Italy) E Dalla Valle	7	6
(Hungary) Z Piros	4	1
4	(Slovakia) J Kovalík	6	6
5	(France) V Royer	6	7^{7}
WC	(Croatia) D Prižmić	3	6^{4}
WC	(Bosnia and Herzegovina) N Fatić	6	6
(Spain) C Sánchez Jover	3	4

Quarterfinals
Alt	(Italy) E Dalla Valle	6	3	7^{8}
4	(Slovakia) J Kovalík	2	6	6^{6}
5	(France) V Royer	7^{7}	7
WC	(Bosnia and Herzegovina) N Fatić	6^{2}	5

Semifinals
Alt	(Italy) E Dalla Valle	2	1
5	(France) V Royer	6	6
