= 2022 Zadar Open – Singles =

Singles
- 2022 Zadar Open

Final
- Champion: (Italy) Flavio Cobolli
- Runner-up: (Poland) Daniel Michalski
- Score: 6–4, 6–2

Events
Singles	Doubles
← 2021 ·	Zadar Open	· 2023 →

Nikola Milojević was the defending champion but lost in the first round to Eduard Esteve Lobato.

Flavio Cobolli won the title after defeating Daniel Michalski 6–4, 6–2 in the final.

== Seeds ==
1. (Italy) Gianluca Mager (first round)
2. (Serbia) Nikola Milojević (first round)
3. (Slovakia) Andrej Martin (second round)
4. (Czech Republic) Zdeněk Kolář (first round)
5. (Italy) Franco Agamenone (first round)
6. (Italy) Flavio Cobolli (champion)
7. (Bulgaria) Dimitar Kuzmanov (first round)
8. (France) Manuel Guinard (semifinals)

== Draw ==
=== Key ===
- Q = Qualifier
- WC = Wild card
- LL = Lucky loser
- Alt = Alternate
- SE = Special exempt
- PR = Protected ranking
- ITF = ITF entry
- JE = Junior exempt
- w/o = Walkover
- r = Retired
- d = Defaulted
- SR = Special ranking

=== Finals ===
Semifinals
Q	(Spain) Carlos Sánchez Jover	6	2	2
Q	(Poland) Daniel Michalski	3	6	6
8	(France) Manuel Guinard	2	6	3
6	(Italy) Flavio Cobolli	6	3	6

Final
Q	(Poland) Daniel Michalski	4	2
6	(Italy) Flavio Cobolli	6	6

=== Top half ===
First round
1	(Italy) G Mager	2	2
(Croatia) D Ajduković	6	6
(Italy) L Giustino	6	5	7
(Hungary) Z Piros	4	7	5
(Portugal) G Elias	2	4
Q	(Romania) C Crețu	6	6
Q	(Spain) C Sánchez Jover	6	0	6
5	(Italy) F Agamenone	4	6	1
3	(Slovakia) A Martin	6	6
Q	(Italy) Riccardo Balzerani	3	3
Q	(Italy) M Arnaldi	2	2
(Czech Republic) D Svrčina	6	6
WC	(Croatia) M Poljičak	2	6	5
Q	(Poland) D Michalski	6	4	7
(Bosnia and Herzegovina) N Fatić	6	7^{7}
7	(Bulgaria) D Kuzmanov	2	6^{5}

Second round
(Croatia) D Ajduković	6	7^{7}
(Italy) L Giustino	4	6^{1}
Q	(Romania) C Crețu	4	1
Q	(Spain) C Sánchez Jover	6	6
3	(Slovakia) A Martin	6	2	2
(Czech Republic) D Svrčina	4	6	6
Q	(Poland) D Michalski	7	6
(Bosnia and Herzegovina) N Fatić	5	1

Quarterfinals
(Croatia) D Ajduković	6^{3}	3
Q	(Spain) C Sánchez Jover	7^{7}	6
(Czech Republic) D Svrčina	3	1
Q	(Poland) D Michalski	6	6

Semifinals
Q	(Spain) C Sánchez Jover	6	2	2
Q	(Poland) D Michalski	3	6	6

=== Bottom half ===
First round
8	(France) M Guinard	7	6
(Italy) G Zeppieri	5	2
Q	(Serbia) M Zekić	6	6
(Czech Republic) L Rosol	3	4
(Italy) A Vavassori	6	7^{7}
(China) Zh Zhang	2	6^{3}
WC	(Serbia) H Međedović	6	7^{9}
4	(Czech Republic) Z Kolář	2	6^{7}
6	(Italy) F Cobolli	1	6	6
(Croatia) N Serdarušić	6	4	1
WC	(Croatia) D Prižmić	7	6
(Uzbekistan) D Istomin	5	3
(Italy) R Brancaccio	6	7
(Spain) J Barranco Cosano	2	5
(Spain) Eduard Esteve Lobato	3	6	6
2	(Serbia) N Milojević	6	2	3

Second round
8	(France) M Guinard	6	6
Q	(Serbia) M Zekić	3	4
(Italy) A Vavassori	6	6
WC	(Serbia) H Međedović	1	4
6	(Italy) F Cobolli	2	7	6
WC	(Croatia) D Prižmić	6	5	2
(Italy) R Brancaccio	3	6	2
(Spain) E Esteve Lobato	6	2	6

Quarterfinals
8	(France) M Guinard	6	6
(Italy) A Vavassori	4	4
6	(Italy) F Cobolli	6	7
(Spain) E Esteve Lobato	1	5

Semifinals
8	(France) M Guinard	2	6	3
6	(Italy) F Cobolli	6	3	6
