= 2025 Zadar Open – Doubles =

Doubles
- 2025 Zadar Open

Final
- Champions: (Czech Republic) Zdeněk Kolář (Austria) Neil Oberleitner
- Runners-up: (Ukraine) Denys Molchanov (Netherlands) Mick Veldheer
- Score: 6–3, 6–4

Events
Singles	Doubles
← 2024 ·	Zadar Open	· 2026 →

Manuel Guinard and Grégoire Jacq were the defending champions but chose not to defend their title.

Zdeněk Kolář and Neil Oberleitner won the title after defeating Denys Molchanov and Mick Veldheer 6–3, 6–4 in the final.

== Seeds ==
1. (Ukraine) Denys Molchanov / (Netherlands) Mick Veldheer (final)
2. (France) Geoffrey Blancaneaux / (Poland) Szymon Walków (quarterfinals)
3. (Peru) Alexander Merino / (Germany) Christoph Negritu (first round)
4. (Austria) David Pichler / (France) Luca Sanchez (first round)

== Draw ==
=== Key ===
- Q = Qualifier
- WC = Wild card
- LL = Lucky loser
- Alt = Alternate
- ITF = ITF entry
- PR = Protected ranking
- SR = Special ranking
- SE = Special exempt
- JE = Junior exempt
- JR = Junior Accelerator Programme entrant
- CO = College Accelerator Programme entrant
- NG = Next Gen Accelerator Program entrant
- w/o = Walkover
- r = Retired
- d = Defaulted

=== Draw ===
First round
1	(Ukraine) D Molchanov (Netherlands) M Veldheer	7^{7}	6
(Argentina) P Cachin (Kazakhstan) T Skatov	6^{1}	2
(Czech Republic) V Kopřiva (Poland) D Michalski	7	6
(Romania) A Jecan (Romania) FC Jianu	5	2
3	(Peru) A Merino (Germany) C Negritu	4	3
(Czech Republic) D Svrčina (Czech Republic) M Vrbenský	6	6
(Italy) M Cecchinato (Italy) E Dalla Valle	6^{4}	3
(Italy) F Agamenone (France) L Pavlovic	7^{7}	6
(Zimbabwe) CJ Lock (Ukraine) O Ovcharenko	1	2
WC	(Croatia) L Mikrut (Croatia) M Poljičak	6	6
(Serbia) I Sabanov (Serbia) M Sabanov	6	6^{4}	[10]
4	(Austria) D Pichler (France) L Sanchez	2	7^{7}	[3]
WC	(Slovakia) J Kovalík (Croatia) N Serdarušić	6	4	[7]
(Czech Republic) Z Kolář (Austria) N Oberleitner	4	6	[10]
Alt	(Bosnia and Herzegovina) M Bašić (Bosnia and Herzegovina) N Fatić
2	(France) G Blancaneaux (Poland) S Walków	w/o

Quarterfinals
1	(Ukraine) D Molchanov (Netherlands) M Veldheer	3	6	[10]
(Czech Republic) V Kopřiva (Poland) D Michalski	6	3	[5]
(Czech Republic) D Svrčina (Czech Republic) M Vrbenský
(Italy) F Agamenone (France) L Pavlovic	w/o
WC	(Croatia) L Mikrut (Croatia) M Poljičak	4	2
(Serbia) I Sabanov (Serbia) M Sabanov	6	6
(Czech Republic) Z Kolář (Austria) N Oberleitner	1	6	[10]
2	(France) G Blancaneaux (Poland) S Walków	6	4	[7]

Semifinals
1	(Ukraine) D Molchanov (Netherlands) M Veldheer	3	7^{7}	[10]
(Italy) F Agamenone (France) L Pavlovic	6	6^{5}	[5]
(Serbia) I Sabanov (Serbia) M Sabanov	2	5
(Czech Republic) Z Kolář (Austria) N Oberleitner	6	7

Final
1	(Ukraine) D Molchanov (Netherlands) M Veldheer	3	4
(Czech Republic) Z Kolář (Austria) N Oberleitner	6	6
