= 2026 Zadar Open – Doubles =

Doubles
- 2026 Zadar Open

Final
- Champions: (Ecuador) Gonzalo Escobar (Croatia) Nino Serdarušić
- Runners-up: (Italy) Simone Agostini (Czech Republic) Jonáš Forejtek
- Score: 6–1, 6–2

Events
Singles	Doubles
- Zadar Open

Zdeněk Kolář and Neil Oberleitner were the defending champions but chose not to defend their title.

Gonzalo Escobar and Nino Serdarušić won the title after defeating Simone Agostini and Jonáš Forejtek 6–1, 6–2 in the final.

== Seeds ==
1. (Ecuador) Gonzalo Escobar / (Croatia) Nino Serdarušić (champions)
2. (Germany) Tim Rühl / (Netherlands) Mick Veldheer (quarterfinals)
3. (Poland) Szymon Kielan / (Portugal) Tiago Pereira (first round)
4. (Sweden) Erik Grevelius / (Sweden) Adam Heinonen (quarterfinals)

== Draw ==
Key

- Q = Qualifier
- WC = Wild card
- LL = Lucky loser
- Alt = Alternate
- ITF = ITF entry
- PR = Protected ranking
- SR = Special ranking
- SE = Special exempt
- JE = Junior exempt
- JR = Junior Accelerator Programme entrant
- CO = College Accelerator Programme entrant
- NG = Next Gen Accelerator Program entrant
- w/o = Walkover
- r = Retired
- d = Defaulted

First round
1	(Ecuador) G Escobar (Croatia) N Serdarušić	6	6
(Bosnia and Herzegovina) M Bašić (Serbia) S Latinović	3	4
(Czech Republic) J Jermář (Italy) S Travaglia	1	5
(Croatia) M Dodig (Croatia) M Poljičak	6	7
4	(Sweden) E Grevelius (Sweden) A Heinonen	6	6
(Netherlands) M Hermans (Australia) C Puttergill	3	2
(Serbia) I Sabanov (Serbia) M Sabanov	4^{r}
WC	(Poland) D Michalski (Croatia) Josip Šimundža	5
(United Kingdom) S Duncan (United Kingdom) B Jones	2	5
WC	(Croatia) D Ajduković (Croatia) A Kalender	6	7
(United Kingdom) C Thomson (United Kingdom) M Whitehouse	6	7
3	(Poland) S Kielan (Portugal) T Pereira	3	5
(Italy) Simone Agostini (Czech Republic) J Forejtek	6^{2}	7^{7}	[10]
(Venezuela) Juan José Bianchi (Venezuela) B Pérez	7^{7}	6^{4}	[8]
Alt	(Czech Republic) M Krumich (Netherlands) J Sels	4	6^{2}
2	(Germany) T Rühl (Netherlands) M Veldheer	6	7^{7}

Quarterfinals
1	(Ecuador) G Escobar (Croatia) N Serdarušić	6	6
(Croatia) M Dodig (Croatia) M Poljičak	2	1
4	(Sweden) E Grevelius (Sweden) A Heinonen	6	3	[11]
WC	(Poland) D Michalski (Croatia) J Šimundža	2	6	[13]
WC	(Croatia) D Ajduković (Croatia) A Kalender	6	1	[10]
(United Kingdom) C Thomson (United Kingdom) M Whitehouse	2	6	[7]
(Italy) S Agostini (Czech Republic) J Forejtek	7^{7}	7^{7}
2	(Germany) T Rühl (Netherlands) M Veldheer	6^{1}	6^{5}

Semifinals
1	(Ecuador) G Escobar (Croatia) N Serdarušić	4
WC	(Poland) D Michalski (Croatia) J Šimundža	0^{r}
WC	(Croatia) D Ajduković (Croatia) A Kalender	2	0
(Italy) S Agostini (Czech Republic) J Forejtek	6	6

Final
1	(Ecuador) G Escobar (Croatia) N Serdarušić	6	6
(Italy) S Agostini (Czech Republic) J Forejtek	1	2
