= 2024 Zadar Open – Doubles =

Doubles
- 2024 Zadar Open

Final
- Champions: (France) Manuel Guinard (France) Grégoire Jacq
- Runners-up: (Czech Republic) Roman Jebavý (Czech Republic) Zdeněk Kolář
- Score: 6–4, 6–4

Events
Singles	Doubles
← 2023 ·	Zadar Open	· 2025 →

Manuel Guinard and Nino Serdarušić were the defending champions but chose to defend their title with different partners. Guinard partnered Grégoire Jacq and successfully defended his title. Serdarušić partnered Stefano Travaglia but lost in the first round to Jonáš Forejtek and Michael Vrbenský.

Guinard and Jacq won the title after defeating Roman Jebavý and Zdeněk Kolář 6–4, 6–4 in the final.

== Seeds ==
1. (Germany) Constantin Frantzen / (Germany) Hendrik Jebens (quarterfinals)
2. (Serbia) Nikola Ćaćić / (Ukraine) Denys Molchanov (semifinals)
3. (Czech Republic) Roman Jebavý / (Czech Republic) Zdeněk Kolář (final)
4. (France) Manuel Guinard / (France) Grégoire Jacq (champions)

== Draw ==
Key

- Q = Qualifier
- WC = Wild card
- LL = Lucky loser
- Alt = Alternate
- ITF = ITF entry
- PR = Protected ranking
- SR = Special ranking
- SE = Special exempt
- JE = Junior exempt
- JR = Junior Accelerator Programme entrant
- CO = College Accelerator Programme entrant
- NG = Next Gen Accelerator Program entrant
- w/o = Walkover
- r = Retired
- d = Defaulted

=== Draw ===
First round
1	(Germany) C Frantzen (Germany) H Jebens	6	7^{7}
WC	(Bosnia and Herzegovina) M Bašić (Bosnia and Herzegovina) N Fatić	3	6^{5}
(Serbia) I Sabanov (Serbia) M Sabanov	6	7
(Germany) J Schnaitter (Germany) M Wallner	3	5
3	(Czech Republic) R Jebavý (Czech Republic) Z Kolář	4	6	[10]
WC	(Croatia) M Dodig (Croatia) Josip Šimundža	6	3	[8]
(Slovakia) J Kovalík (Slovakia) I Zelenay	6	3	[7]
(Sweden) F Bergevi (Netherlands) M Veldheer	4	6	[10]
(United Kingdom) S Duncan (United Kingdom) M Willis	6	3	[11]
(Poland) D Michalski (Ukraine) Eric Vanshelboim	3	6	[9]
(Bulgaria) D Kuzmanov (Italy) F Maestrelli
4	(France) M Guinard (France) G Jacq	w/o
(Czech Republic) J Forejtek (Czech Republic) M Vrbenský	6	3	[11]
(Croatia) N Serdarušić (Italy) S Travaglia	4	6	[9]
(Italy) M Bortolotti (Italy) A Giannessi	4	0
2	(Serbia) N Ćaćić (Ukraine) D Molchanov	6	6

Quarterfinals
1	(Germany) C Frantzen (Germany) H Jebens	3	6	[6]
(Serbia) I Sabanov (Serbia) M Sabanov	6	3	[10]
3	(Czech Republic) R Jebavý (Czech Republic) Z Kolář	6^{5}	6	[10]
(Sweden) F Bergevi (Netherlands) M Veldheer	7^{7}	1	[7]
(United Kingdom) S Duncan (United Kingdom) M Willis	6^{3}	6^{5}
4	(France) M Guinard (France) G Jacq	7^{7}	7^{7}
(Czech Republic) J Forejtek (Czech Republic) M Vrbenský	7^{7}	2	[11]
2	(Serbia) N Ćaćić (Ukraine) D Molchanov	6^{4}	6	[13]

Semifinals
(Serbia) I Sabanov (Serbia) M Sabanov	7	2	[9]
3	(Czech Republic) R Jebavý (Czech Republic) Z Kolář	5	6	[11]
4	(France) M Guinard (France) G Jacq	6	6
2	(Serbia) N Ćaćić (Ukraine) D Molchanov	2	2

Final
3	(Czech Republic) R Jebavý (Czech Republic) Z Kolář	4	4
4	(France) M Guinard (France) G Jacq	6	6
