= 2023 Zadar Open =

- Date: 20–26 March
- Edition: 3rd
- Surface: Clay
- Location: Zadar, Croatia

Champions

Singles
- (Italy) Alessandro Giannessi

Doubles
- (France) Manuel Guinard / (Croatia) Nino Serdarušić
← 2022 ·	Zadar Open	· 2024 →

The 2023 Zadar Open was a professional tennis tournament played on clay courts. It was the third edition of the tournament which was part of the 2023 ATP Challenger Tour. It took place in Zadar, Croatia between 20 and 26 March 2023.

== Singles main-draw entrants ==
=== Seeds ===
Country	Player	Rank^{1}	Seed
TPE	Tseng Chun-hsin	125	1
SVK	Jozef Kovalík	145	2
GBR	Ryan Peniston	152	3
AUT	Sebastian Ofner	160	4
ITA	Flavio Cobolli	165	5
~~FRA~~	~~Laurent Lokoli~~	~~168~~	~~6~~
CZE	Vít Kopřiva	169	7
FRA	Manuel Guinard	177	8

- ^{1} Rankings are as of 6 March 2023.

=== Other entrants ===
The following players received wildcards into the singles main draw:

- (Croatia) Duje Ajduković
- (Croatia) Mili Poljičak
- (Croatia) Dino Prižmić

The following players received entry from the qualifying draw:

- (Bosnia and Herzegovina) Mirza Bašić
- (Italy) Giovanni Fonio
- (Germany) Jeremy Jahn
- (Italy) Julian Ocleppo
- (Austria) David Pichler
- (Italy) Giulio Zeppieri

The following players received entry as lucky losers:

- (Italy) Salvatore Caruso
- (Serbia) Nikola Milojević

== Champions ==
=== Singles ===
- (Italy) Alessandro Giannessi def. (Austria) Sebastian Ofner 6–4, 5–7, 7–6^{(8–6)}.

=== Doubles ===
- (France) Manuel Guinard / (Croatia) Nino Serdarušić def. (Serbia) Ivan Sabanov / (Serbia) Matej Sabanov 6–4, 6–0.
