= 2021 Zadar Open =

- Date: 22–28 March
- Edition: 1st
- Surface: Clay
- Location: Zadar, Croatia

Champions

Singles
- (Serbia) Nikola Milojević

Doubles
- (Slovenia) Blaž Kavčič / (Slovenia) Blaž Rola
Zadar Open	· 2022 →

The 2021 Zadar Open was a professional tennis tournament played on clay courts. It was the first edition of the tournament which was part of the 2021 ATP Challenger Tour. It took place in Zadar, Croatia between 22 and 28 March 2021.

== Singles main-draw entrants ==
=== Seeds ===
Country	Player	Rank^{1}	Seed
ITA	Gianluca Mager	101	1
IND	Sumit Nagal	139	2
SRB	Nikola Milojević	146	3
SLO	Blaž Rola	165	4
ITA	Alessandro Giannessi	167	5
SVK	Filip Horanský	173	6
FRA	Enzo Couacaud	185	7
ITA	Gian Marco Moroni	233	8

- ^{1} Rankings are as of 15 March 2021.

=== Other entrants ===
The following players received wildcards into the singles main draw:

- (Croatia) Frane Ninčević
- (Croatia) Matija Pecotić
- (Croatia) Mili Poljičak

The following player received entry into the singles main draw as an alternate:

- (Australia) Harry Bourchier

The following players received entry from the qualifying draw:

- (Italy) Marco Bortolotti
- (Bosnia and Herzegovina) Nerman Fatić
- (Belarus) Uladzimir Ignatik
- (Spain) Nikolás Sánchez Izquierdo

The following players received entry as lucky losers:

- (Russia) Ivan Nedelko
- (Ukraine) Vladyslav Orlov

== Champions ==
=== Singles ===
- (Serbia) Nikola Milojević def. (Bulgaria) Dimitar Kuzmanov 2–6, 6–2, 7–6^{(7–5)}.

=== Doubles ===
- (Slovenia) Blaž Kavčič / (Slovenia) Blaž Rola def. (Slovakia) Lukáš Klein / (Slovakia) Alex Molčan 2–6, 6–2, [10–3].
