= 2024 Zadar Open – Singles =

Singles
- 2024 Zadar Open

Final
- Champion: (Slovakia) Jozef Kovalík
- Runner-up: (Bulgaria) Adrian Andreev
- Score: 6–4, 6–2

Events
Singles	Doubles
- Zadar Open

Alessandro Giannessi was the defending champion but lost in the second round to Timofey Skatov.

Jozef Kovalík won the title after defeating Adrian Andreev 6–4, 6–2 in the final.

== Seeds ==
1. (Austria) Dominic Thiem (second round)
2. (France) Corentin Moutet (first round)
3. (Hungary) Zsombor Piros (second round)
4. (Austria) Filip Misolic (first round, retired)
5. (Croatia) Dino Prižmić (second round)
6. (Italy) Stefano Travaglia (second round)
7. (France) Matteo Martineau (first round)
8. (Bosnia and Herzegovina) Nerman Fatić (first round)

== Draw ==
Key

- Q = Qualifier
- WC = Wild card
- LL = Lucky loser
- Alt = Alternate
- ITF = ITF entry
- PR = Protected ranking
- SR = Special ranking
- SE = Special exempt
- JE = Junior exempt
- JR = Junior Accelerator Programme entrant
- CO = College Accelerator Programme entrant
- NG = Next Gen Accelerator Program entrant
- w/o = Walkover
- r = Retired
- d = Defaulted

=== Finals ===
Semifinals
Q	(Czech Republic) Jonáš Forejtek	4	3
(Slovakia) Jozef Kovalík	6	6
(Bulgaria) Adrian Andreev	6	6
(Kazakhstan) Timofey Skatov	3	4

Final
(Slovakia) Jozef Kovalík	6	6
(Bulgaria) Adrian Andreev	4	2

=== Top half ===
First round
1	(Austria) D Thiem	6	7^{7}
WC	(Serbia) F Krajinović	2	6^{4}
Q	(France) Mathys Erhard	3	2
(Austria) L Neumayer	6	6
Q	(Ukraine) O Krutykh	1	7	2
Q	(Czech Republic) J Forejtek	6	5	6
Alt	(Czech Republic) M Vrbenský	1	2
5	(Croatia) D Prižmić	6	6
3	(Hungary) Z Piros	7^{7}	6
Alt	(Poland) D Michalski	6^{0}	2
(Slovakia) J Kovalík	6	6
Q	(France) E Furness	0	2
(Czech Republic) Z Kolář	6	6^{4}	6
(Italy) R Bonadio	4	7^{7}	3
WC	(Croatia) N Serdarušić	6	6
7	(France) M Martineau	3	1

Second round
1	(Austria) D Thiem	2	1
(Austria) L Neumayer	6	6
Q	(Czech Republic) J Forejtek	7^{10}	0	6
5	(Croatia) D Prižmić	6^{8}	6	4
3	(Hungary) Z Piros	6	6^{4}	3
(Slovakia) J Kovalík	0	7^{7}	6
(Czech Republic) Z Kolář	6	3	2
WC	(Croatia) N Serdarušić	2	6	6

Quarterfinals
(Austria) L Neumayer	3	6	4
Q	(Czech Republic) J Forejtek	6	1	6
(Slovakia) J Kovalík	3	6	7^{7}
WC	(Croatia) N Serdarušić	6	3	6^{4}

Semifinals
Q	(Czech Republic) J Forejtek	4	3
(Slovakia) J Kovalík	6	6

=== Bottom half ===
First round
6	(Italy) S Travaglia	6	6
(France) C Tabur	4	1
Q	(France) A Géa	2	6	4
(Italy) E Dalla Valle	6	3	6
(France) M Guinard	1	4
(Bulgaria) A Andreev	6	6
WC	(Croatia) M Dodig	7^{7}	5
4	(Austria) F Misolic	6^{2}	2^{r}
8	(Bosnia and Herzegovina) N Fatić	0	6^{5}
(Bulgaria) D Kuzmanov	6	7^{7}
(Italy) F Maestrelli	2	6^{3}
Q	(Austria) S Kopp	6	7^{7}
(Austria) D Novak	6^{5}	7^{7}	1
(Kazakhstan) T Skatov	7^{7}	6^{5}	6
(Italy) A Giannessi	5	6	6
2	(France) C Moutet	7	2	4

Second round
6	(Italy) S Travaglia	1	4
(Italy) E Dalla Valle	6	6
(Bulgaria) A Andreev	6	4	6
WC	(Croatia) M Dodig	4	6	1
(Bulgaria) D Kuzmanov	6^{7}	2
Q	(Austria) S Kopp	7^{9}	6
(Kazakhstan) T Skatov	6	6
(Italy) A Giannessi	1	2

Quarterfinals
(Italy) E Dalla Valle	6	4	2
(Bulgaria) A Andreev	3	6	6
Q	(Austria) S Kopp	6	3	4
(Kazakhstan) T Skatov	4	6	6

Semifinals
(Bulgaria) A Andreev	6	6
(Kazakhstan) T Skatov	3	4
