= 2026 Zadar Open – Singles =

Singles
- 2026 Zadar Open

Final
- Champion: (Italy) Stefano Travaglia
- Runner-up: (France) Arthur Géa
- Score: 2–1 ret.

Events
Singles	Doubles
- Zadar Open

Borna Ćorić was the defending champion but chose not to defend his title.

Stefano Travaglia won the title after Arthur Géa retired trailing 1–2 in the final.

== Seeds ==
1. (Hungary) Zsombor Piros (first round)
2. (France) Kyrian Jacquet (semifinals)
3. (France) Arthur Géa (final, retired)
4. (Italy) Stefano Travaglia (champion)
5. (Slovakia) Alex Molčan (quarterfinals, retired)
6. (Italy) Lorenzo Giustino (first round)
7. (Croatia) Matej Dodig (semifinals)
8. (Austria) Lukas Neumayer (quarterfinals)

== Draw ==
Key

- Q = Qualifier
- WC = Wild card
- LL = Lucky loser
- Alt = Alternate
- ITF = ITF entry
- PR = Protected ranking
- SR = Special ranking
- SE = Special exempt
- JE = Junior exempt
- JR = Junior Accelerator Programme entrant
- CO = College Accelerator Programme entrant
- NG = Next Gen Accelerator Program entrant
- w/o = Walkover
- r = Retired
- d = Defaulted

=== Finals ===
Semifinals
7	(Croatia) Matej Dodig	6^{3}	3
4	(Italy) Stefano Travaglia	7^{7}	6
3	(France) Arthur Géa	6^{4}	7^{7}	6
2	(France) Kyrian Jacquet	7^{7}	6^{2}	1

Final
4	(Italy) Stefano Travaglia	2
3	(France) Arthur Géa	1^{r}

=== Top half ===
First round
1	(Hungary) Z Piros	1	6^{4}
WC	(Italy) E Dalla Valle	6	7^{7}
Alt	(Serbia) Dušan Obradović	0	4
(Croatia) D Ajduković	6	6
(Czech Republic) M Krumich	7	6
Q	(Germany) John Sperle	5	4
Q	(France) L Lokoli	6	2	6^{0}
7	(Croatia) M Dodig	2	6	7^{7}
4	(Italy) S Travaglia	7	7
(Croatia) M Poljičak	5	5
(Germany) H Squire	6	5
LL	(Romania) Ștefan Paloși	4	3^{r}
(Spain) M Alcalá Gurri	6	6
Q	(Czech Republic) Matyáš Černý	2	2
Q	(United States) Christian Langmo	1	3
5	(Slovakia) A Molčan	6	6

Second round
WC	(Italy) E Dalla Valle	4	5
(Croatia) D Ajduković	6	7
(Czech Republic) M Krumich	6	4	6^{4}
7	(Croatia) M Dodig	3	6	7^{7}
4	(Italy) S Travaglia	6	6
(Germany) H Squire	3	2
(Spain) M Alcalá Gurri	6	3	2
5	(Slovakia) A Molčan	1	6	6

Quarterfinals
(Croatia) D Ajduković	3	3
7	(Croatia) M Dodig	6	6
4	(Italy) S Travaglia	6	0
5	(Slovakia) A Molčan	2	0^{r}

Semifinals
7	(Croatia) M Dodig	6^{3}	3
4	(Italy) S Travaglia	7^{7}	6

=== Bottom half ===
First round
8	(Austria) L Neumayer	3	6	6
(India) S Nagal	6	3	4
(Bosnia and Herzegovina) N Fatić	7	6
(Portugal) T Pereira	5	2
Q	(Italy) S Pieri	3	0
(Poland) D Michalski	6	6
(Bulgaria) D Kuzmanov	6	2	3
3	(France) A Géa	4	6	6
6	(Italy) L Giustino	2	4
(Czech Republic) J Forejtek	6	6
(Bosnia and Herzegovina) A Nedić	7	6
WC	(Croatia) Emanuel Ivanišević	5	2
WC	(Croatia) Josip Šimundža	1	1
Q	(Spain) Sergi Pérez Contri	6	6
(Netherlands) J Sels	0	6	0
2	(France) K Jacquet	6	4	6

Second round
8	(Austria) L Neumayer	4	6	6
(Bosnia and Herzegovina) N Fatić	6	3	4
(Poland) D Michalski	3	6^{4}
3	(France) A Géa	6	7^{7}
(Czech Republic) J Forejtek	6	6
(Bosnia and Herzegovina) A Nedić	3	4
Q	(Spain) S Pérez Contri	2	0
2	(France) K Jacquet	6	6

Quarterfinals
8	(Austria) L Neumayer	6^{1}	6	3
3	(France) A Géa	7^{7}	4	6
(Czech Republic) J Forejtek	6^{3}	2
2	(France) K Jacquet	7^{7}	6

Semifinals
3	(France) A Géa	6^{4}	7^{7}	6
2	(France) K Jacquet	7^{7}	6^{2}	1
