= 2025 Zadar Open =

- Date: 17–23 March
- Edition: 5th
- Surface: Clay
- Location: Zadar, Croatia

Champions

Singles
- (Croatia) Borna Ćorić

Doubles
- (Czech Republic) Zdeněk Kolář / (Austria) Neil Oberleitner
← 2024 ·	Zadar Open	· 2026 →

The 2025 Zadar Open, known as the Falkensteiner Punta Skala Zadar Open, was a professional tennis tournament played on clay courts. It was the fifth edition of the tournament which was part of the 2025 ATP Challenger Tour. It took place in Zadar, Croatia between 17 and 23 March 2025.

== Singles main-draw entrants ==
=== Seeds ===
Country	Player	Rank^{1}	Seed
BIH	Damir Džumhur	84	1
CZE	Vít Kopřiva	119	2
CRO	Borna Ćorić	120	3
SVK	Jozef Kovalík	125	4
FRA	Valentin Royer	151	5
CZE	Dalibor Svrčina	164	6
CRO	Duje Ajduković	167	7
GER	Henri Squire	173	8

- ^{1} Rankings are as of 3 March 2025.

=== Other entrants ===
The following players received wildcards into the singles main draw:

- (Bosnia and Herzegovina) Nerman Fatić
- (Croatia) Mili Poljičak
- (Croatia) Dino Prižmić

The following player received entry into the singles main draw as a special exempt:

- (Bulgaria) Dimitar Kuzmanov

The following player received entry into the singles main draw as an alternate:

- (Italy) Enrico Dalla Valle

The following players received entry from the qualifying draw:

- (Bosnia and Herzegovina) Mirza Bašić
- (Czech Republic) Zdeněk Kolář
- (Slovakia) Andrej Martin
- (Croatia) Luka Mikrut
- (France) Luka Pavlovic
- (Germany) Marko Topo

== Champions ==
=== Singles ===
- (Croatia) Borna Ćorić def. (France) Valentin Royer 3–6, 6–2, 6–3.

=== Doubles ===
- (Czech Republic) Zdeněk Kolář / (Austria) Neil Oberleitner def. (Ukraine) Denys Molchanov / (Netherlands) Mick Veldheer 6–3, 6–4.
