= 2022 Zadar Open =

Tennis tournament in Zadar, Croatia (2022)

- Date: 21–27 March
- Edition: 2nd
- Prize money: €45,730 (2022)
- Surface: Clay
- Location: Zadar, Croatia

Champions

Singles
- (Italy) Flavio Cobolli

Doubles
- (Czech Republic) Zdeněk Kolář / (Italy) Andrea Vavassori
← 2021 ·	Zadar Open	· 2023 →

The 2022 Zadar Open was a professional tennis tournament played on clay courts. It was the second edition of the tournament which was part of the 2022 ATP Challenger Tour. It took place in Zadar, Croatia between 21 and 27 March 2022.

== Singles main-draw entrants ==
=== Seeds ===
Country	Player	Rank^{1}	Seed
ITA	Gianluca Mager	95	1
SRB	Nikola Milojević	126	2
SVK	Andrej Martin	127	3
CZE	Zdeněk Kolář	138	4
ITA	Franco Agamenone	169	5
ITA	Flavio Cobolli	177	6
BUL	Dimitar Kuzmanov	193	7
FRA	Manuel Guinard	199	8

- ^{1} Rankings are as of 14 March 2022.

=== Other entrants ===
The following players received wildcards into the singles main draw:

- (Serbia) Hamad Međedović
- (Croatia) Mili Poljičak
- (Croatia) Dino Prižmić

The following players received entry from the qualifying draw:

- (Italy) Matteo Arnaldi
- (Italy) Riccardo Balzerani
- (Romania) Cezar Crețu
- (Poland) Daniel Michalski
- (Spain) Carlos Sánchez Jover
- (Serbia) Miljan Zekić

== Champions ==
=== Singles ===
- (Italy) Flavio Cobolli def. (Poland) Daniel Michalski 6–4, 6–2.

=== Doubles ===
- (Czech Republic) Zdeněk Kolář / (Italy) Andrea Vavassori def. (Italy) Franco Agamenone / (France) Manuel Guinard 3–6, 7–6^{(9–7)}, [10–6].
