= 2024 Zadar Open =

- Date: 18–24 March
- Edition: 4th
- Surface: Clay
- Location: Zadar, Croatia

Champions

Singles
- (Slovakia) Jozef Kovalík

Doubles
- (France) Manuel Guinard / (France) Grégoire Jacq
- Zadar Open

The 2024 Zadar Open was a professional tennis tournament played on clay courts. It was the fourth edition of the tournament which was part of the 2024 ATP Challenger Tour. It took place in Zadar, Croatia between 18 and 24 March 2024.

== Singles main-draw entrants ==
=== Seeds ===
Country	Player	Rank^{1}	Seed
AUT	Dominic Thiem	91	1
FRA	Corentin Moutet	105	2
HUN	Zsombor Piros	106	3
AUT	Filip Misolic	164	4
CRO	Dino Prižmić	169	5
ITA	Stefano Travaglia	189	6
FRA	Matteo Martineau	190	7
BIH	Nerman Fatić	194	8

- ^{1} Rankings are as of 4 March 2024.

=== Other entrants ===
The following players received wildcards into the singles main draw:

- (Croatia) Matej Dodig
- (Serbia) Filip Krajinović
- (Croatia) Nino Serdarušić

The following players received entry into the singles main draw as alternates:

- (Poland) Daniel Michalski
- (Czech Republic) Michael Vrbenský

The following players received entry from the qualifying draw:

- (France) Mathys Erhard
- (Czech Republic) Jonáš Forejtek
- (France) Evan Furness
- (France) Arthur Géa
- (Austria) Sandro Kopp
- (Ukraine) Oleksii Krutykh

== Champions ==
=== Singles ===
- (Slovakia) Jozef Kovalík def. (Bulgaria) Adrian Andreev 6–4, 6–2.

=== Doubles ===
- (France) Manuel Guinard / (France) Grégoire Jacq def. (Czech Republic) Roman Jebavý / (Czech Republic) Zdeněk Kolář 6–4, 6–4.
