= Sebastian Ofner =

Austrian tennis player (born 1996)

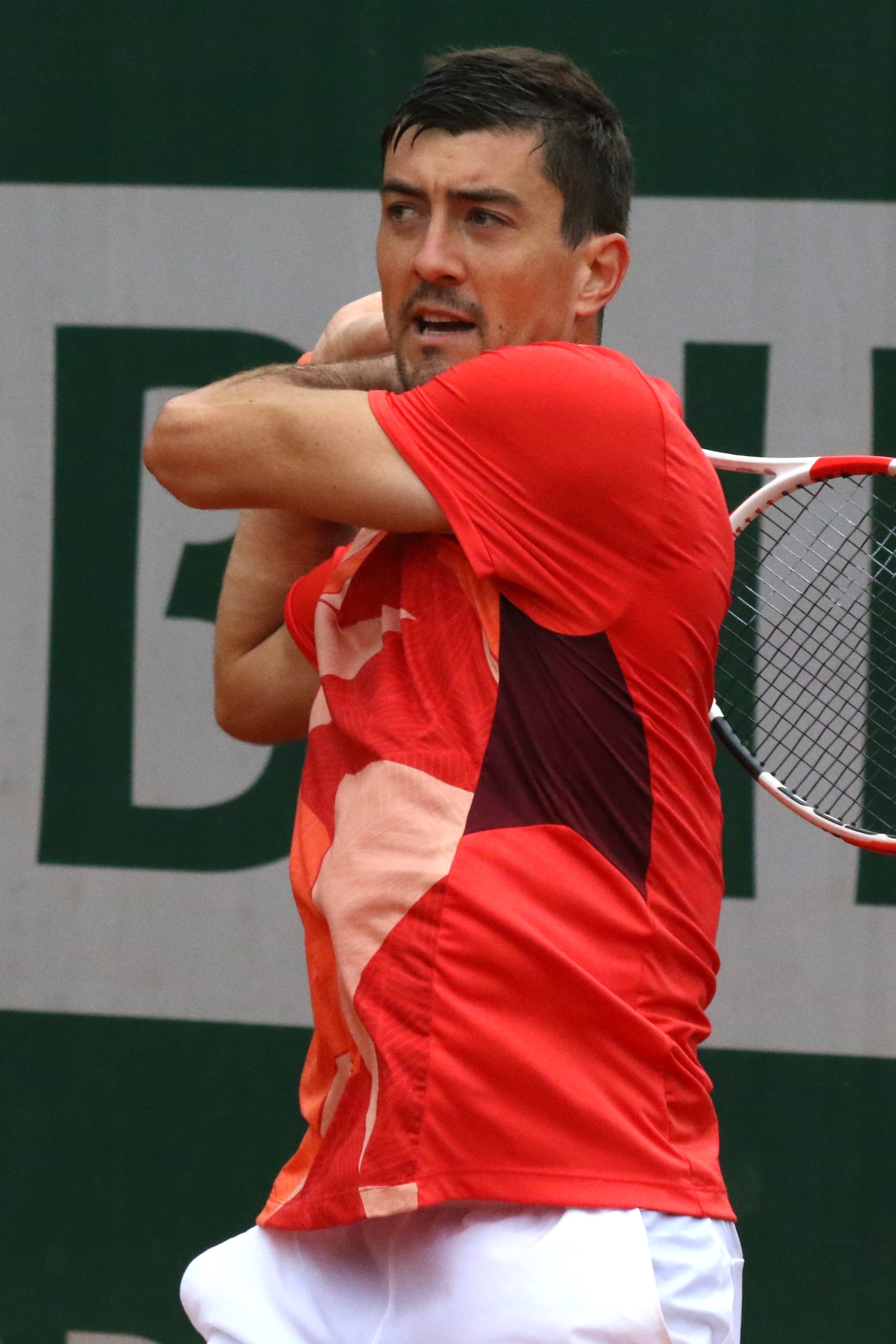
- Ofner at the 2023 French Open
- Country (sports): Austria
- Residence: Sankt Marein im Mürztal, Austria
- Born: 12 May 1996 (age 30) Bruck an der Mur, Austria
- Height: 1.91 m (6 ft 3 in)
- Turned pro: 2015
- Plays: Right-handed (two-handed backhand)
- Coach: Stefan Rettl, Wolfgang Thiem (2017-), Alexander Peya (2019)
- Prize money: US $4,052,019

Singles
- Career record: 53–74
- Career titles: 0
- Highest ranking: No. 37 (8 January 2024)
- Current ranking: No. 122 (19 October 2026)

Grand Slam singles results
- Australian Open: 1R (2024)
- French Open: 4R (2023)
- Wimbledon: 3R (2017, 2025)
- US Open: 2R (2023)

Other tournaments
- Olympic Games: 2R (2024)

Doubles
- Career record: 3–19
- Career titles: 0
- Highest ranking: No. 240 (29 January 2024)
- Current ranking: No. 669 (31 August 2026)

Grand Slam doubles results
- Australian Open: 2R (2024)
- Wimbledon: 2R (2024)
- US Open: 1R (2023, 2024)
- Last updated on: 31 October 2026.

Sebastian Ofner (born 12 May 1996) is an Austrian professional tennis player. He has a career high ATP singles ranking of World No. 37 achieved on 8 January 2024. He is currently the No. 1 Austrian player.

== Professional career ==
=== 2017: ATP and Grand Slam debut at Wimbledon & third round ===
Ofner made his ATP main draw debut at the 2017 Wimbledon Championships after going through qualifying, defeating Kimmer Coppejans, Miljan Zekić and Jay Clarke. In the first round, he beat Thomaz Bellucci in straight sets. In the next round, he upset world No. 18 Jack Sock in a five-setter.

In August, Ofner caused another surprise in front of his home crowd at the 2017 Generali Open Kitzbühel by defeating first seed Pablo Cuevas as a wildcard in the second round. He then won over Renzo Olivo to reach the semifinals where he fell to João Sousa.

=== 2018–2022: Maiden Challenger title, French Open debut ===
Ofner won his maiden ATP Challenger title at the 2018 President's Cup in Astana.

At the 2022 French Open he qualified to make his Grand Slam main draw debut at this Major. He lost to World No. 3 Alexander Zverev in the first round.

=== 2023: Major fourth round, Austrian No. 1, top 50, Masters debut and first win ===
In the first three months of the season Ofner reached three Challenger Tour finals in Tenerife, Antalya and in Zadar.

He qualified for his first ATP tournament for the season in Estoril where he lost in the first round to Dominic Thiem.

Ranked No. 118, he qualified for the main draw of the 2023 French Open for a second consecutive year and defeated Maxime Cressy for his first win at this Major. Next he defeated 24th seed Sebastian Korda to reach the third round for a second time at a Major. He went one step further and defeated Fabio Fognini to reach the fourth round of a Major for the first time in his career. He lost to Stefanos Tsitsipas in straight sets. As a result, he made his top 100 debut at world No. 81 and became the Austrian No. 1 player on 12 June 2023. He further reached the top 70 following a Challenger final showing at the 2023 Ilkley Trophy where he lost to Jason Kubler. As a result of his run he received a wildcard for the 2023 Wimbledon Championships, where he had made the third round previously in 2017. He reached a new career-high ranking of No. 52 on 24 July 2023. He also made the second round at the last Major, the US Open.

At the 2023 Astana Open, he reached the semifinals defeating third seed Alexander Bublik and this time compatriot Dominic Thiem. As a result, he moved into the top 50 in the rankings on 2 October 2023. He lost to sixth seed and eventual champion Adrian Mannarino.

Ofner made his Masters debut at the 2023 Rolex Shanghai Masters where he reached the second round for his first win over Juan Pablo Varillas. He received a wildcard for the 2023 Erste Bank Open.

He finished the year ranked No. 43 in the world.

=== 2024-2025: Top 40, Australian, Olympics debuts, ATP final ===
Ofner reached the semifinals in Hong Kong defeating Mackenzie McDonald, fifth seed Jan-Lennard Struff and Roberto Bautista Agut. He lost to Emil Ruusuvuori in three sets. As a result, he reached the top 40 on 8 January 2024.

He made his debut at the 2024 Australian Open where he lost to Thanasi Kokkinakis in a tight five setter with a fifth set tiebreak.

He reached his maiden final at the 2024 Mallorca Championships, which he lost to Alejandro Tabilo.

== Performance timeline ==
Key
| W | F | SF | QF | #R | RR | Q# | DNQ | A | NH |

(W) winner; (F) finalist; (SF) semifinalist; (QF) quarterfinalist; (#R) rounds 4, 3, 2, 1; (RR) round-robin stage; (Q#) qualification round; (DNQ) did not qualify; (A) absent; (NH) not held; (SR) strike rate (events won / competed); (W–L) win–loss record.
To avoid confusion and double counting, these charts are updated at the conclusion of a tournament or when the player's participation has ended.

Current through the 2025 Rolex Shanghai Masters.

| Tournament | 2015 | 2016 | 2017 | 2018 | 2019 | 2020 | 2021 | 2022 | 2023 | 2024 | 2025 | SR | W–L |
|---|---|---|---|---|---|---|---|---|---|---|---|---|---|
Grand Slam tournaments
| Australian Open | A | A | A | Q1 | Q2 | Q1 | Q1 | A | Q3 | 1R | A | 0 / 1 | 0–1 |
| French Open | A | A | A | Q1 | Q2 | Q3 | Q1 | 1R | 4R | 3R | 2R | 0 / 4 | 6–4 |
| Wimbledon | A | A | 3R | Q1 | Q1 | NH | Q3 | Q3 | 1R | 1R | 3R | 0 / 4 | 4–4 |
| US Open | A | A | Q1 | Q2 | Q1 | A | Q1 | Q2 | 2R | 1R | 1R | 0 / 2 | 1–3 |
| Win–loss | 0–0 | 0–0 | 2–1 | 0–0 | 0–0 | 0–0 | 0–0 | 0–1 | 4–3 | 2–4 | 3–3 | 0 / 11 | 11–12 |
National representation
| Olympics | NH | A | NH | | | | A | NH | | 2R | NH | 0 / 1 | 1–1 |
| Davis Cup | A | A | A | G1 | G1 | A | A | A | G1 | | | 0 / 0 | 0–3 |
ATP Tour Masters 1000
| Indian Wells Masters | A | A | A | A | A | NH | A | A | A | 1R | A | 0 / 1 | 0–1 |
| Miami Open | A | A | A | A | A | NH | A | A | A | 2R | A | 0 / 1 | 1–1 |
| Monte-Carlo Masters | A | A | A | A | A | NH | A | A | A | 2R | A | 0 / 1 | 1–1 |
| Madrid Open | A | A | A | A | A | NH | A | A | Q2 | 1R | 2R | 0 / 2 | 1–2 |
| Italian Open | A | A | A | A | A | A | A | A | A | 1R | 3R | 0 / 2 | 2–2 |
| Canadian Open | A | A | A | A | A | NH | A | A | A | A | 1R | 0 / 1 | 0–1 |
| Cincinnati Masters | A | A | A | A | A | A | A | A | A | A | 1R | 0 / 1 | 0–1 |
| Shanghai Masters | A | A | A | A | A | NH | | | 2R | A | 1R | 0 / 2 | 1–2 |
| Paris Masters | A | A | A | A | A | A | A | A | Q2 | A | | 0 / 0 | 0–0 |
Career statistics
| Tournaments | 0 | 0 | 3 | 2 | 1 | 1 | 3 | 2 | 13 | 24 | 14 | 63 | |
| Overall win–loss | 0–0 | 0–0 | 5–3 | 1–3 | 1–2 | 1–1 | 2–3 | 1–2 | 13–14 | 17–24 | 9–14 | 50–66 | |
| Year-end ranking | 743 | 288 | 143 | 179 | 156 | 159 | 191 | 195 | 43 | 88 | 134 | 44% | |

== ATP Tour finals ==
=== Singles: 1 (runner-up) ===
| Legend Grand Slam (–) ATP 1000 (–) ATP 500 (–) ATP 250 (0–1) | Finals by surface Hard (–) Clay (–) Grass (0–1) | Finals by setting Outdoor (0–1) Indoor (–) |

| Result | W–L | Date | Tournament | Tier | Surface | Opponent | Score |
|---|---|---|---|---|---|---|---|
| Loss | 0–1 | Jun 2024 | Mallorca Championships, Spain | ATP 250 | Grass | (Chile) Alejandro Tabilo | 3–6, 4–6 |

== ATP Challenger Tour finals ==
=== Singles: 16 (6 titles, 10 runner-ups) ===
| Legend ATP Challenger Tour (6–10) | Finals by surface Hard (4–4) Clay (2–5) Grass (0–1) |

| Result | W–L | Date | Tournament | Tier | Surface | Opponent | Score |
|---|---|---|---|---|---|---|---|
| Loss | 0–1 | May 2017 | Mestre, Italy | Challenger | Clay | (Portugal) João Domingues | 6–7^{(4–7)}, 4–6 |
| Win | 1–1 | Jul 2018 | Astana, Kazakhstan | Challenger | Hard | (Germany) Daniel Brands | 7–6^{(7–5)}, 6–3 |
| Win | 2–1 | May 2019 | Puerto Vallarta, Mexico | Challenger | Hard | (Australia) John-Patrick Smith | 7–6^{(10–8)}, 3–6, 6–3 |
| Loss | 2–2 | Nov 2019 | Ortisei, Italy | Challenger | Hard (i) | (Italy) Jannik Sinner | 2–6, 4–6 |
| Loss | 2–3 | Nov 2020 | Hamburg, Germany | Challenger | Hard (i) | (Japan) Taro Daniel | 1–6, 2–6 |
| Loss | 2–4 | Mar 2021 | Nur-Sultan, Kazakhstan | Challenger | Hard | (Czech Republic) Tomáš Macháč | 6–4, 4–6, 4–6 |
| Win | 3–4 | Apr 2022 | Prague, Czech Republic | Challenger | Clay | (Czech Republic) Dalibor Svrčina | 6–0, 6–4 |
| Loss | 3–5 | Jan 2023 | Tenerife, Spain | Challenger | Hard | Alexander Shevchenko | 5–7, 2–6 |
| Loss | 3–6 | Mar 2023 | Antalya, Turkey | Challenger | Clay | (Hungary) Fábián Marozsán | 5–7, 0–6 |
| Loss | 3–7 | Mar 2023 | Zadar, Croatia | Challenger | Clay | (Italy) Alessandro Giannessi | 4–6, 7–5, 6–7^{(6–8)} |
| Loss | 3–8 | May 2023 | Prague, Czech Republic | Challenger | Clay | (Switzerland) Dominic Stricker | 6–7^{(7–9)}, 3–6 |
| Loss | 3–9 | Jun 2023 | Ilkley, United Kingdom | Challenger | Grass | (Australia) Jason Kubler | 4–6, 4–6 |
| Win | 4–9 | Jul 2023 | Salzburg, Austria | Challenger | Clay | (Austria) Lukas Neumayer | 6–3, 6–2 |
| Win | 5–9 | Feb 2026 | Saint-Brieuc, France | Challenger | Hard (i) | (France) Pierre-Hugues Herbert | 6–4, 7–6^{(7–4)} |
| Win | 6–9 | Mar 2026 | Thionville, France | Challenger | Hard (i) | (Norway) Nicolai Budkov Kjær | 6–7^{(5–7)}, 6–3, 7–6^{(9–7)} |
| Loss | 6–10 | Jun 2026 | Parma, Italy | Challenger | Clay | (France) Luca Van Assche | 6–2, 2–6, 3–6 |

=== Doubles: 5 (3 titles, 2 runner-ups) ===
| Legend ATP Challenger Tour (3–2) |

| Result | W–L | Date | Tournament | Tier | Surface | Partner | Opponents | Score |
|---|---|---|---|---|---|---|---|---|
| Loss | 0–1 | Jun 2018 | Shymkent, Kazakhstan | Challenger | Clay | (Austria) Lucas Miedler | (Italy) Lorenzo Giustino (Portugal) Gonçalo Oliveira | 2–6, 6–7^{(4–7)} |
| Win | 1–1 | Apr 2019 | León, Mexico | Challenger | Hard | (Austria) Lucas Miedler | (Australia) Matt Reid (Australia) John-Patrick Smith | 4–6, 6–4, [10–6] |
| Loss | 1–2 | Feb 2023 | Chennai, India | Challenger | Hard | (Croatia) Nino Serdarušić | (United Kingdom) Jay Clarke (India) Arjun Kadhe | 0–6, 4–6 |
| Win | 2–2 | Mar 2025 | Menorca, Spain | Challenger | Clay | (Lebanon) Benjamin Hassan | (Italy) Andrea Vavassori (Italy) Matteo Vavassori | 7–5, 6–3 |
| Win | 3–2 | Mar 2026 | Murcia, Spain | Challenger | Clay | (Lebanon) Benjamin Hassan | (Poland) Karol Drzewiecki (Poland) Piotr Matuszewski | 6–3, 6–4 |

== ITF Futures finals ==
=== Singles: 10 (5 titles, 5 runner-ups) ===
| Legend ITF Futures (5–5) | Finals by surface Hard (2–4) Clay (3–1) |

| Result | W–L | Date | Tournament | Tier | Surface | Opponent | Score |
|---|---|---|---|---|---|---|---|
| Loss | 0–1 | Aug 2015 | Austria F8, Vogau | Futures | Clay | (Kazakhstan) Dmitry Popko | 0–6, 2–6 |
| Loss | 0–2 | Apr 2016 | Turkey F14, Antalya | Futures | Hard | (Germany) Marc Sieber | 7–5, 5–7, 3–6 |
| Win | 1–2 | Jul 2016 | Austria F3, Bad Waltersdorf | Futures | Clay | (France) Corentin Denolly | 6–4, 4–6, 6–3 |
| Win | 2–2 | Aug 2016 | Austria F5, Innsbruck | Futures | Clay | (Portugal) Gonçalo Oliveira | 6–2, 6–3 |
| Win | 3–2 | Sep 2016 | Austria F5, St. Pölten | Futures | Clay | (Italy) Riccardo Bellotti | 7–5, 6–4 |
| Loss | 3–3 | Nov 2016 | Greece F10, Heraklion | Futures | Hard | (Czech Republic) Václav Šafránek | 6–4, 3–6, 5–7 |
| Win | 4–3 | Nov 2016 | Greece F11, Heraklion | Futures | Hard | (Czech Republic) Dominik Kellovský | 7–6^{(8–6)}, 6–4 |
| Loss | 4–4 | Dec 2016 | Qatar F5, Doha | Futures | Hard | (India) Ramkumar Ramanathan | 5–7, 3–6 |
| Loss | 4–5 | Dec 2016 | Qatar F6, Doha | Futures | Hard | (India) Ramkumar Ramanathan | 5–7, 3–6 |
| Win | 5–5 | Feb 2017 | Turkey F5, Antalya | Futures | Hard | (Czech Republic) Michal Konečný | 3–6, 6–1, 6–2 |

=== Doubles: 7 (2 titles, 5 runner-ups) ===
| Legend ITF Futures (2–5) | Finals by surface Hard (2–1) Clay (0–4) |

| Result | W–L | Date | Tournament | Tier | Surface | Partner | Opponents | Score |
|---|---|---|---|---|---|---|---|---|
| Loss | 0–1 | Jul 2013 | Austria F5, Bad Waltersdorf | Futures | Clay | (Austria) Patrick Ofner | (Austria) Philip Lang (Austria) Richard Ruckelshausen | 6–7^{(5–7)}, 3–6 |
| Loss | 0–2 | Jul 2015 | Austria F5, Bad Waltersdorf | Futures | Clay | (Austria) Philip Lang | (Slovenia) Tom Kočevar-Dešman (Austria) Lucas Miedler | 2–6, 2–6 |
| Loss | 0–3 | Jul 2016 | Austria F3, Bad Waltersdorf | Futures | Clay | (Austria) Sebastian Bader | (Austria) Bernd Kossler (Austria) Gregor Ramskogler | 4–6, 6–2, [4–10] |
| Loss | 0–4 | Aug 2016 | Austria F6, Vogau | Futures | Clay | (Austria) Lenny Hampel | (Bolivia) Hugo Dellien (Bolivia) Federico Zeballos | 5–7, 4–6 |
| Win | 1–4 | Nov 2016 | Greece F11, Heraklion | Futures | Hard | (Austria) Lenny Hampel | (Croatia) Domagoj Bilješko (Croatia) Antun Vidak | 7–5, 6–2 |
| Loss | 1–5 | Dec 2016 | Qatar F4, Doha | Futures | Hard | (Austria) Lenny Hampel | (United Kingdom) James Marsalek (United Kingdom) Jonny O'Mara | 4–6, 4–6 |
| Win | 2–5 | Feb 2017 | Turkey F4, Antalya | Futures | Hard | (Austria) Alexander Erler | (Ukraine) Volodymyr Uzhylovskyi (Russia) Anton Zaitcev | 6–2, 3–6, [10–7] |

== Record against top 10 players ==
- Ofner's record against players who have been ranked in the top 10, with those who are active in **boldface**. Only ATP Tour main draw matches and Davis Cup matches are considered:

| Player | Record | Win % | Hard | Clay | Grass | Last match |
|---|---|---|---|---|---|---|
| **Number 1 ranked players** | | | | | | |
| (Russia) **Daniil Medvedev** | 0–2 | 0% | 0–1 | 0–1 | – | Lost (2–6, 2–6) at 2024 Paris Olympics |
| Number 2 ranked players | | | | | | |
| (Norway) **Casper Ruud** | 0–2 | 0% | – | 0–2 | – | Lost (6–4, 2–6, 2–6) at 2024 Geneva |
| (Germany) **Alexander Zverev** | 0–4 | 0% | 0–1 | 0–2 | 0–1 | Lost (3–6, 4–6) at 2024 Monte Carlo |
| Number 3 ranked players | | | | | | |
| (Austria) Dominic Thiem | 1–3 | 25% | 1–0 | 0–3 | – | Won (5–7, 6–4, 6–2) at 2023 Astana |
| (Croatia) **Marin Čilić** | 0–1 | 0% | – | – | 0–1 | Lost (2–6, 7–6^{(7–5)}, 6–7^{(4–7)}) at 2021 Queen's Club |
| (Greece) **Stefanos Tsitsipas** | 0–2 | 0% | – | 0–2 | – | Lost (4–6, 5–7) at 2024 Barcelona |
| Number 4 ranked players | | | | | | |
| (Japan) **Kei Nishikori** | 1–0 | 100% | 1–0 | – | – | Won (6–3, 6–4) at 2024 Miami |
| Number 5 ranked players | | | | | | |
| (South Africa) Kevin Anderson | 0–1 | 0% | – | – | 0–1 | Lost (5–7, 6–7^{(3–7)}) at 2021 Newport |
| Number 6 ranked players | | | | | | |
| (Canada) **Félix Auger-Aliassime** | 0–1 | 0% | 0–1 | – | – | Lost (4–6, 1–6) at 2023 Tokyo |
| (Australia) **Alex de Minaur** | 0–1 | 0% | 0–1 | – | – | Lost (1–6, 3–6) at 2024 Acapulco |
| Number 7 ranked players | | | | | | |
| (France) Richard Gasquet | 1–0 | 100% | – | 1–0 | – | Won (1–6, 7–5, 7–5) at 2022 Kitzbühel |
| Number 8 ranked players | | | | | | |
| (United States) Jack Sock | 1–0 | 100% | – | – | 1–0 | Won (6–3, 6–4, 3–6, 2–6, 6–2) at 2017 Wimbledon |
| (Argentina) Diego Schwartzman | 0–1 | 0% | – | 0–1 | – | Lost (2–6, 6–2, 5–7) at 2020 Kitzbühel |
| Number 9 ranked players | | | | | | |
| (Spain) **Roberto Bautista Agut** | 1–0 | 100% | 1–0 | – | – | Won (6–4, 6–4) at 2024 Hong Kong |
| (Italy) Fabio Fognini | 1–0 | 100% | – | 1–0 | – | Won (5–7, 6–3, 7–5, 1–6, 6–4) at 2023 French Open |
| Number 10 ranked players | | | | | | |
| (Canada) **Denis Shapovalov** | 1–0 | 100% | 1–0 | – | – | Won (6–4, 6–2) at 2024 Auckland |
| (France) Lucas Pouille | 0–1 | 0% | 0–1 | – | – | Lost (3–6, 4–6) at 2017 Vienna |
| (United States) **Frances Tiafoe** | 1–1 | 50% | 0–1 | 1–0 | – | Won (6–2, 6–7, 6–3) at 2025 Rome |
| **Total** | **7–20** | **26%** | **4–6 (40%)** | **2–11 (15%)** | **1–3 (25%)** | *** Statistics correct as of 22 May 2025.** |
