= 2026 Zadar Open =

- Date: 16–22 March
- Edition: 6th
- Surface: Clay
- Location: Zadar, Croatia

Champions

Singles
- (Italy) Stefano Travaglia

Doubles
- (Ecuador) Gonzalo Escobar / (Croatia) Nino Serdarušić
- Zadar Open

The 2026 Zadar Open was a professional tennis tournament played on clay courts. It was the sixth edition of the tournament which was part of the 2026 ATP Challenger Tour. It took place in Zadar, Croatia between 16 and 22 March 2026.

== Singles main-draw entrants ==
=== Seeds ===
Country	Player	Rank^{1}	Seed
HUN	Zsombor Piros	142	1
FRA	Kyrian Jacquet	149	2
FRA	Arthur Géa	161	3
ITA	Stefano Travaglia	166	4
SVK	Alex Molčan	200	5
ITA	Lorenzo Giustino	204	6
CRO	Matej Dodig	215	7
AUT	Lukas Neumayer	230	8

- ^{1} Rankings are as of 2 March 2026.

=== Other entrants ===
The following players received wildcards into the singles main draw:

- (Italy) Enrico Dalla Valle
- (Croatia) Emanuel Ivanišević
- (Croatia) Josip Šimundža

The following player received entry into the singles main draw as a special exempt:

- (Czech Republic) ~~Maxim Mrva~~

The following player received entry into the singles main draw as an alternate:

- (Serbia) Dušan Obradović

The following players received entry from the qualifying draw:

- (Czech Republic) Matyáš Černý
- (United States) Christian Langmo
- (France) Laurent Lokoli
- (Spain) Sergi Pérez Contri
- (Italy) Samuele Pieri
- (Germany) John Sperle

The following player received entry as a lucky loser:

- (Romania) Ștefan Paloși

== Champions ==
=== Singles ===
- (Italy) Stefano Travaglia def. (France) Arthur Géa 2–1 retired.

=== Doubles ===
- (Ecuador) Gonzalo Escobar / (Croatia) Nino Serdarušić def. (Italy) Simone Agostini / (Czech Republic) Jonáš Forejtek 6–1, 6–2.
