= Frane Ninčević =

Croatian tennis player

- Country (sports): Croatia
- Residence: Sukošan, Croatia
- Born: 17 June 1999 (age 27) Zagreb, Croatia
- Height: 1.83 m (6 ft 0 in)
- Plays: Right-handed (two-handed backhand)
- Prize money: US $18,200

Singles
- Career record: 0–0 (at ATP Tour level, Grand Slam level, and in Davis Cup)
- Career titles: 0
- Highest ranking: No. 1,009 (21 March 2022)

Doubles
- Career record: 0–1 (at ATP Tour level, Grand Slam level, and in Davis Cup)
- Career titles: 0
- Highest ranking: No. 551 (22 August 2022)
- Last updated on: 26 October 2026.

Frane Ninčević (born 17 June 1999) is a Croatian tennis player. He has a career-high ATP singles ranking of world No. 1,009 achieved on 21 March 2022 and a doubles ranking of No. 551 achieved on 22 August 2022.

Ninčević made his ATP main draw debut at the 2021 Croatia Open Umag after receiving a wildcard into the doubles main draws.

== ITF World Tennis Tour finals ==
=== Doubles: 5 (3 titles, 2 runner-ups) ===
Legend ITF WTT (3–2)	Finals by surface Hard (0–0) Clay (3–2)

Result	W–L	Date	Tournament	Tier	Surface	Partner	Opponents	Score
Win	1–0	Jun 2021	M15 Sarajevo, Bosnia and Herzegovina	WTT	Clay	(Croatia) Domagoj Bilješko	(Brazil) Gilbert Klier Júnior (Brazil) João Lucas Reis da Silva	6–2, 3–6, [10–4]
Loss	1–1	Jul 2021	M25 Velenje, Slovenia	WTT	Clay	(Croatia) Duje Kekez	(Austria) Neil Oberleitner (Austria) David Pichler	4–6, 6–7^{(1–7)}
Win	2–1	Jul 2022	M25 Radomlje, Slovenia	WTT	Clay	Mikalai Haliak	(Slovenia) Žiga Kovačič (Slovenia) Jan Kupčič	7–6^{(7–2)}, 4–6, [10–4]
Win	3–1	Aug 2022	M15 Novi Sad, Serbia	WTT	Clay	(Ukraine) Oleksandr Ovcharenko	Marat Sharipov (Serbia) Viktor Jović	7–5, 3–6, [11–9]
Loss	3–2	Aug 2022	M25 Padova, Italy	WTT	Clay	(Croatia) Duje Ajduković	(Australia) Jason Taylor (Australia) Brandon Walkin	6–7^{(3–7)}, 0–6
