= Zdeněk Kolář =

Czech tennis player (born 1996)

- Kolář at the 2026 Wimbledon Championships
- Country (sports): Czech Republic
- Residence: Bystřice nad Pernštejnem, Czech Republic
- Born: 9 October 1996 (age 30) Bystřice nad Pernštejnem, Czech Republic
- Height: 1.85 m (6 ft 1 in)
- Turned pro: 2014
- Plays: Right-handed (two-handed backhand)
- Coach: Zdenek Kolar Sr.
- Prize money: US $1,303,312

Singles
- Career record: 1–3
- Career titles: 0
- Highest ranking: No. 111 (13 June 2022)
- Current ranking: No. 154 (22 June 2026)

Grand Slam singles results
- Australian Open: Q2 (2018, 2022)
- French Open: 2R (2022)
- Wimbledon: 1R (2022)
- US Open: Q3 (2023)

Doubles
- Career record: 1–2
- Career titles: 0
- Highest ranking: No. 110 (1 August 2022)
- Current ranking: No. 220 (22 June 2026)
- Last updated on: 22 June 2026.

Zdeněk Kolář (Czech pronunciation: [ˈzdɛɲɛk ˈkolaːr̝̊]; born 9 October 1996) is a Czech tennis player. Kolář has a career high ATP singles ranking of world No. 111 achieved on 13 June 2022 and a career high doubles ranking of No. 110 achieved on 1 August 2022.

== Professional career ==
=== 2016-2018: First ITF title and ATP debut ===
In 2016, Kolář won his maiden ITF title in Porec, Croatia.

Kolář played his first main draw match in an ATP tournament, after qualifying for the 2018 Swedish Open. He was defeated in straight sets by defending champion and former Top 10 member David Ferrer.

=== 2021: Three Challenger titles ===
In 2021, Kolář won three ATP Challenger singles titles: in April in Oeiras Portugal, in August in Iasi Romania, in September in Szczecin Poland and four ATP Challenger doubles titles.

=== 2022-2023: Grand Slam debut and first win ===
In 2022, Kolář made his ATP main draw debut in doubles at Chile Open alongside Nikola Milojević. They reached the quarterfinals with a win over local wildcards Alejandro Tabilo and Gonzalo Lama.

In his fifth qualifying attempt, Kolar finally reached the main draw of the 2022 French Open with a straight sets win over Franco Agamenone for his Grand Slam tournament main draw debut. He won his first ATP and Grand Slam match defeating home favorite and wildcard Lucas Pouille. He lost in the second round to fourth seed Stefanos Tsitsipas in four sets with three tiebreaks in a match that lasted over four hours.

He entered the 2022 Wimbledon Championships main draw as a lucky loser but lost to Benjamin Bonzi.

=== 2025: Fifth Challenger title ===
Kolář won his fifth Challenger title and first since 2023 at the 2025 Genesis Trading Cup in Sofia, Bulgaria after defeating Murkel Dellien in the final. Kolář claimed his sixth Challenger title in November at the 2025 Montemar Challenger in Alicante, Spain after beating first time Challenger finalist Gianluca Cadenasso in the final and returned to world's Top 200 after this win.

== National representation ==
Kolář was nominated for the Czech Republic Davis Cup team in 2017 but did not play in a match.

== Performance timeline ==
Key
W	F	SF	QF	#R	RR	Q#	DNQ	A	NH

(W) winner; (F) finalist; (SF) semifinalist; (QF) quarterfinalist; (#R) rounds 4, 3, 2, 1; (RR) round-robin stage; (Q#) qualification round; (DNQ) did not qualify; (A) absent; (NH) not held; (SR) strike rate (events won / competed); (W–L) win–loss record.
To avoid confusion and double counting, these charts are updated at the conclusion of a tournament or when the player's participation has ended.

=== Singles ===
Tournament	2017	2018	2019	2020	2021	2022	2023	2024	2025	2026	SR	W–L	Win %
Grand Slam tournaments
Australian Open	Q1	Q2	Q1	Q1	Q1	Q2	A	Q1	A	Q1	0 / 0	0–0	–
French Open	A	Q3	Q1	Q1	Q1	2R	Q2	Q2	A		0 / 1	1–1	50%
Wimbledon	A	Q2	Q1	NH	Q2	1R	Q1	A	A		0 / 1	0–1	0%
US Open	A	Q1	Q2	A	Q2	Q1	Q3	A	A		0 / 0	0–0	–
Win–loss	0–0	0–0	0–0	0–0	0–0	1–2	0–0	0–0	0–0	0–0	0 / 2	1–2	33%
ATP Masters 1000
Indian Wells Masters	A	A	A	NH	A	A	A	A	A		0 / 0	0–0	–
Miami Open	A	A	A	NH	A	A	A	A	A		0 / 0	0–0	–
Monte Carlo Masters	A	A	A	NH	A	A	A	A	A		0 / 0	0–0	–
Madrid Open	A	A	A	NH	A	A	A	A	A		0 / 0	0-0	–
Italian Open	A	A	A	A	A	A	A	A	A		0 / 0	0–0	–
Canadian Open	A	A	A	NH	A	A	A	A	A		0 / 0	0–0	–
Cincinnati Masters	A	A	A	A	A	A	A	A	A		0 / 0	0–0	–
Shanghai Masters	A	A	A	NH			A	A	A		0 / 0	0–0	–
Paris Masters	A	A	A	A	A	A	A	A	A		0 / 0	0–0	–
Win–loss	0–0	0–0	0–0	0–0	0–0	0–0	0–0	0–0	0–0	0–0	0 / 0	0–0	–

== ATP Challenger and ITF Tour finals ==
=== Singles: 26 (13 titles, 13 runner-ups) ===
Legend ATP Challenger Tour (6–3) ITF Futures/WTT (7–10)	Finals by surface Hard (1–1) Clay (11–11) Grass (0–0) Carpet (0–1)

Result	W–L	Date	Tournament	Tier	Surface	Opponent	Score
Win	1–0	Mar 2016	Croatia F2, Poreč	Futures	Clay	(Germany) Yannick Maden	4–6, 6–4, 6–2
Loss	1–1	Mar 2016	Croatia F3, Pula	Futures	Clay	(Spain) Pedro Martínez	3–6, 1–6
Loss	1–2	May 2016	Hungary F3, Szeged	Futures	Clay	(Belgium) Germain Gigounon	1–6, 0–6
Win	2–2	May 2016	Czech Republic F2, Prague	Futures	Clay	(Belgium) Clement Geens	6–3, 6–2
Loss	2–3	Mar 2017	Croatia F2, Poreč	Futures	Clay	(Italy) Riccardo Bellotti	4–6, 3–6
Loss	2–4	Apr 2017	Croatia F4, Opatija	Futures	Clay	(Serbia) Laslo Đere	5–7, 4–6
Loss	2–5	Apr 2017	Kazakhstan F3, Shymkent	Futures	Clay	(Spain) Mario Vilella Martínez	4–6, 6–3, 0–6
Loss	2–6	Apr 2017	Kazakhstan F4, Shymkent	Futures	Clay	(Serbia) Danilo Petrović	6–7^{(3–7)}, 3–6
Win	3–6	Jun 2017	Poland F1, Sopot	Futures	Clay	(Poland) Kamil Majchrzak	6–3, 6–2
Win	4–6	Jul 2017	Poland F5, Mrągowo	Futures	Clay	(Lithuania) Laurynas Grigelis	7–5, 1–0 ret
Loss	4–7	Aug 2017	Poland F10, Poznań	Futures	Clay	(Germany) Mats Moraing	6–7^{(5–7)}, 4–6
Loss	4–8	Sep 2017	Hungary F8, Székesfehérvár	Futures	Clay	(Spain) Enrique López Pérez	1–6, 1–6
Loss	4–9	Oct 2017	Estonia F2, Tartu	Futures	Carpet (i)	(Finland) Harri Heliövaara	3–6, 5–7
Win	5–9	Oct 2024	M15 Grodzisk Mazowiecki, Poland	WTT	Hard (i)	(Poland) Jasza Szajrych	6–3, 6–4
Win	6–9	Jan 2025	M25 Antalya, Turkey	WTT	Clay	(Netherlands) Guy den Ouden	6–3, 2–6, 6–1
Loss	6–10	Feb 2025	M25 Antalya, Turkey	WTT	Clay	(Poland) Daniel Michalski	6–7^{(5–7)}, 1–6
Win	7–10	Jun 2025	M15 Grodzisk Mazowiecki, Poland	WTT	Clay	(Czech Republic) Jakub Filip	6–4, 6–2
Loss	0–1	May 2016	Ostrava, Czech Republic	Challenger	Clay	(France) Constant Lestienne	7–6^{(7–5)}, 1–6, 2–6
Win	1–1	Apr 2021	Oeiras, Portugal	Challenger	Clay	(Portugal) Gastão Elias	6–4, 7–5
Win	2–1	Jul 2021	Iași, Romania	Challenger	Clay	(France) Hugo Gaston	7–5, 4–6, 6–4
Win	3–1	Sep 2021	Szczecin, Poland	Challenger	Clay	(Poland) Kamil Majchrzak	7–6^{(7–4)}, 7–5
Loss	3–2	Feb 2022	Vilnius, Lithuania	Challenger	Hard (i)	(United Kingdom) Liam Broady	4–6, 4–6
Win	4–2	Apr 2023	Ostrava, Czech Republic	Challenger	Clay	(Hungary) Máté Valkusz	6–3, 6–2
Win	5–2	Aug 2025	Sofia, Bulgaria	Challenger	Clay	(Bolivia) Murkel Dellien	6–2, 6–2
Win	6–2	Nov 2025	Alicante, Spain	Challenger	Clay	(Italy) Gianluca Cadenasso	6–4, 6–4
Loss	6–3	May 2026	Ostrava, Czech Republic	Challenger	Clay	(Spain) Nikolás Sánchez Izquierdo	4–6, 6–7^{(4–7)}

=== Doubles: 57 (32 titles, 25 runner-ups) ===
Legend ATP Challenger Tour (25–18) ITF Futures (7–7)	Finals by surface Hard (9–3) Clay (23–21) Grass (0–0) Carpet (0–1)

Result	W–L	Date	Tournament	Tier	Surface	Partner	Opponents	Score
Loss	0–1	Mar 2015	Croatia F5, Pula	Futures	Clay	(Czech Republic) Dominik Süč	(Croatia) Ivan Sabanov (Croatia) Matej Sabanov	6–4, 0–6, [7–10]
Loss	0–2	Aug 2015	Poland F1, Koszalin	Futures	Clay	(Czech Republic) Petr Michnev	(Poland) Grzegorz Panfil (Poland) Marcin Gawron	0–6, 4–6
Win	1–2	Oct 2015	Croatia F18, Solin	Futures	Clay	(Czech Republic) Tomáš Toman	(United States) Stefan Kozlov (Croatia) Nino Serdarušić	6–4, 2–6, [10–6]
Loss	1–3	May 2016	Hungary F3, Szeged	Futures	Clay	(Romania) Victor Vlad Cornea	(Hungary) Gábor Borsos (Hungary) Ádám Kellner	2–6, 1–6
Loss	1–4	May 2016	Czech Republic F2, Prague	Futures	Clay	(Czech Republic) Petr Michnev	(Germany) Oscar Otte (Germany) Andreas Mies	0–6, 4–6
Loss	0–1	Jun 2016	Prague, Czech Republic	Challenger	Clay	(Czech Republic) Matěj Vocel	(Poland) Tomasz Bednarek (Croatia) Nikola Mektić	4–6, 7–5, [7–10]
Win	2–4	Jul 2016	Czech Republic F4, Pardubice	Futures	Clay	(Czech Republic) Jan Hernych	(Czech Republic) David Novák (Czech Republic) Roman Jebavý	6–1, 6–4
Loss	2–5	Aug 2016	Italy F24, Cornaiano	Futures	Clay	(Chile) Bastian Malla	(France) Jonathan Eysseric (Dominican Republic) José Hernández-Fernández	6–7^{(2–7)}, 6–2, [4–10]
Loss	0–2	Aug 2016	Cordenons, Italy	Challenger	Clay	(Czech Republic) Roman Jebavý	(Germany) Andre Begemann (Belarus) Aliaksandr Bury	7–5, 4–6, [9–11]
Loss	2–6	Oct 2016	Hungary F8, Balatonboglár	Futures	Clay	(Czech Republic) Pavel Nejedlý	(Hungary) Gábor Borsos (Hungary) Ádám Kellner	6–3, 2–6, [8–10]
Loss	0–3	Nov 2016	Andria, Italy	Challenger	Carpet (i)	(Czech Republic) Roman Jebavý	(Netherlands) Wesley Koolhof (Netherlands) Matwé Middelkoop	3–6, 3–6
Win	3–6	Mar 2017	Croatia F2, Poreč	Futures	Clay	(Croatia) Nino Serdarušić	(Croatia) Matej Sabanov (Croatia) Ivan Sabanov	6–3, 6–3
Win	4–6	Mar 2017	Croatia F3, Umag	Futures	Clay	(Croatia) Nino Serdarušić	(Argentina) Hernán Casanova (Argentina) Juan Pablo Ficovich	7–5, 6–0
Win	5–6	Apr 2017	Kazakhstan F4, Shymkent	Futures	Clay	(Croatia) Nino Serdarušić	(Russia) Alexander Zhurbin (Spain) Mario Vilella Martínez	6–2, 6–2
Win	1–3	May 2017	Samarkand, Uzbekistan	Challenger	Clay	(Lithuania) Laurynas Grigelis	(India) Prajnesh Gunneswaran (India) Vishnu Vardhan	7–6^{(7–2)}, 6–3
Win	2–3	Aug 2017	Liberec, Czech Republic	Challenger	Clay	(Lithuania) Laurynas Grigelis	(Poland) Tomasz Bednarek (Netherlands) David Pel	6–3, 6–4
Win	3–3	Aug 2017	Cordenons, Italy	Challenger	Clay	(Czech Republic) Roman Jebavý	(Slovakia) Igor Zelenay (Netherlands) Matwé Middelkoop	6–2, 6–3
Loss	3–4	Jan 2018	Bangkok, Thailand	Challenger	Hard	(Portugal) Gonçalo Oliveira	(Spain) Gerard Granollers (Spain) Marcel Granollers	3–6, 6–7^{(6–8)}
Loss	3–5	Jul 2018	Båstad, Sweden	Challenger	Clay	(Portugal) Gonçalo Oliveira	(Finland) Harri Heliövaara (Switzerland) Henri Laaksonen	4–6, 3–6
Win	4–5	Oct 2018	Almaty II, Kazakhstan	Challenger	Hard	(Czech Republic) Lukáš Rosol	(Kazakhstan) Timur Khabibulin (Russia) Evgeny Karlovskiy	6–3, 6–1
Win	5–5	Jan 2019	Koblenz, Germany	Challenger	Hard (i)	(Czech Republic) Adam Pavlásek	(Austria) Jürgen Melzer (Slovakia) Filip Polášek	6–3, 6–4
Win	6–5	Feb 2019	Bergamo, Italy	Challenger	Hard (i)	(Lithuania) Laurynas Grigelis	(Bosnia and Herzegovina) Tomislav Brkić (Germany) Dustin Brown	7–5, 7–6^{(9–7)}
Loss	6–6	May 2019	Braga, Portugal	Challenger	Clay	(Belgium) Kimmer Coppejans	(Spain) Gerard Granollers (Brazil) Fabrício Neis	4–6, 3–6
Win	7–6	Feb 2020	Bergamo, Italy	Challenger	Hard (i)	(Italy) Julian Ocleppo	(Switzerland) Luca Margaroli (Italy) Andrea Vavassori	6–4, 6–3
Loss	7–7	Aug 2020	Prague, Czech Republic	Challenger	Clay	(Czech Republic) Lukáš Rosol	(France) Pierre-Hugues Herbert (France) Arthur Rinderknech	3–6, 4–6
Win	8–7	Sep 2020	Prostejov, Czech Republic	Challenger	Clay	(Czech Republic) Lukáš Rosol	(India) Sriram Balaji (India) Divij Sharan	6–2, 2–6, [10–6]
Loss	8–8	Oct 2020	Lisbon, Portugal	Challenger	Clay	(Finland) Harri Heliövaara	(Dominican Republic) Roberto Cid Subervi (Portugal) Gonçalo Oliveira	6-7^{(5–7)}, 6–4, [4-10]
Win	9–8	Nov 2020	Maia, Portugal	Challenger	Clay	(Italy) Andrea Vavassori	(United Kingdom) Lloyd Glasspool (Finland) Harri Heliövaara	6–3, 6–4
Win	10–8	Feb 2021	Potechefstroom, South Africa	Challenger	Hard	(Switzerland) Marc-Andrea Hüsler	(Canada) Peter Polansky (Canada) Brayden Schnur	6–4, 2–6, [10–4]
Loss	10–9	Feb 2021	Potechefstroom II, South Africa	Challenger	Hard	(Belgium) Julien Cagnina	(South Africa) Raven Klaasen (South Africa) Ruan Roelofse	4-6, 4–6
Loss	10–10	June 2021	Prostejov, Czech Republic	Challenger	Clay	(Czech Republic) Roman Jebavý	(Kazakhstan) Aleksandr Nedovyesov (Portugal) Gonçalo Oliveira	6-1, 6-7^{(5–7)}, [6-10]
Win	11–10	Jul 2021	Poznań, Poland	Challenger	Clay	(Czech Republic) Jiří Lehečka	(Poland) Karol Drzewiecki (Australia) Aleksandar Vukic	6–4, 3–6, [10–5]
Win	12–10	Aug 2021	City of San Marino, San Marino	Challenger	Clay	(Venezuela) Luis David Martínez	(Brazil) Rafael Matos (Brazil) João Menezes	1–6, 6–3, [10–3]
Win	13–10	Nov 2021	Bergamo, Italy	Challenger	Hard (i)	(Czech Republic) Jiří Lehečka	(United Kingdom) Lloyd Glasspool (Finland) Harri Heliövaara	6-4, 6–4
Win	14–10	Jan 2022	Traralgon, Australia	Challenger	Hard	(France) Manuel Guinard	(Switzerland) Marc-Andrea Hüsler (Switzerland) Dominic Stricker	6-3, 6–4
Win	15–10	Mar 2022	Zadar, Croatia	Challenger	Clay	(Italy) Andrea Vavassori	(Italy) Franco Agamenone (France) Manuel Guinard	3–6, 7–6^{(9–7)}, [10–6]
Loss	15–11	April 2022	Oeiras II, Portugal	Challenger	Clay	(Czech Republic) Adam Pavlásek	(Portugal) Nuno Borges (Portugal) Francisco Cabral	4-6, 0–6
Win	16–11	Jul 2022	Zug, Switzerland	Challenger	Clay	(Czech Republic) Adam Pavlásek	(Poland) Karol Drzewiecki (Finland) Patrik Niklas-Salminen	6–3, 7–5
Loss	16–12	Sep 2022	Tulln an der Donau, Austria	Challenger	Clay	(Ukraine) Denys Molchanov	(Austria) Alexander Erler (Austria) Lucas Miedler	3–6, 4–6
Win	17–12	Sep 2022	Lisbon, Portugal	Challenger	Clay	(Portugal) Gonçalo Oliveira	(Ukraine) Vladyslav Manafov (Ukraine) Oleg Prihodko	6–1, 7–6^{(7–4)}
Loss	17–13	Apr 2023	Barletta, Italy	Challenger	Clay	(Ukraine) Denys Molchanov	(Italy) Jacopo Berrettini (Italy) Flavio Cobolli	6–1, 5–7, [6–10]
Win	18–13	Sep 2023	Tulln an der Donau, Austria	Challenger	Clay	(Slovenia) Blaž Rola	(Poland) Piotr Matuszewski (Germany) Kai Wehnelt	6–4, 4–6, [10–6]
Loss	18–14	Sep 2023	Szczecin, Poland	Challenger	Clay	(Spain) Sergio Martos Gornés	(Czech Republic) Andrew Paulson (Ukraine) Vitaliy Sachko	1–6, 6–7 ^{(6–8)}
Win	19–14	Oct 2023	Lisbon, Portugal	Challenger	Clay	(Poland) Karol Drzewiecki	(Portugal) Jaime Faria (Portugal) Henrique Rocha	6–2, 7–6 ^{(7–5)}
Win	20–14	Nov 2023	Matsuyama, Japan	Challenger	Hard	(Poland) Karol Drzewiecki	(Japan) Toshihide Matsui (Japan) Kaito Uesugi	6–3, 6–2
Loss	20–15	Mar 2024	Zadar, Croatia	Challenger	Clay	(Czech Republic) Roman Jebavý	(France) Gregoire Jacq (France) Manuel Guinard	4–6, 4–6
Win	21–15	Apr 2024	Barletta, Italy	Challenger	Clay	(Chinese Taipei) Tseng Chun-hsin	(France) Théo Arribagé (France) Benjamin Bonzi	1–6, 6–3, [10–7]
Loss	21–16	Jan 2025	Nonthaburi, Thailand	Challenger	Hard	(Austria) Neil Oberleitner	(Japan) Kokoro Isomura (Japan) Rio Noguchi	6–7 ^{(3–7)}, 6–7 ^{(9–11)}
Win	6–6	Feb 2025	M25 Antalya, Turkey	Futures	Clay	(Croatia) Nino Serdarušić	(Italy) Manuel Mazza (Italy) Andrea Picchione	6–3, 7–6 ^{(7–4)}
Win	7–6	Feb 2025	M25 Antalya, Turkey	Futures	Clay	(Croatia) Nino Serdarušić	(Romania) Gabriel Ghetu; Ivan Gretskiy	6–0, 6–2
Loss	21–17	Mar 2025	Kigali, Rwanda	Challenger	Clay	(France) Geoffrey Blancaneaux	(Netherlands) Jesper de Jong (Netherlands) Max Houkes	3–6, 5–7
Loss	21–18	Mar 2025	Kigali, Rwanda	Challenger	Clay	(France) Geoffrey Blancaneaux	(India) Siddhant Banthia (Bulgaria) Alexander Donski	4–6, 7–5, [8–10]
Win	22–18	Mar 2025	Zadar, Croatia	Challenger	Clay	(Austria) Neil Oberleitner	(Ukraine) Denys Molchanov (Netherlands) Mick Veldheer	6–3, 6–4
Loss	7–7	Apr 2025	M25 Antalya, Turkey	Futures	Clay	(Czech Republic) Jakub Nicod	(Finland) Patrick Kaukovalta (Finland) Eero Vasa	1–6, 3–6
Win	23–18	May 2025	Bogotá, Colombia	Challenger	Clay	(Brazil) Luís Britto	(Peru) Arklon Huertas del Pino (Peru) Conner Huertas del Pino	6–4, 7–6 ^{(7–4)}
Win	24–18	Jan 2026	Oeiras, Portugal	Challenger	Hard (i)	(Czech Republic) Filip Duda	(Sweden) Erik Grevelius (Sweden) Adam Heinonen	6–3, 6–4
Win	25–18	Nov 2026	Sauipe, Brazil	Challenger	Clay	(Argentina) Santiago Rodríguez Taverna	(Ecuador) Diego Hidalgo (Argentina) Andrés Molteni	6–4, 6–4
