= Nikola Milojević (tennis) =

Serbian tennis player (born 1995)

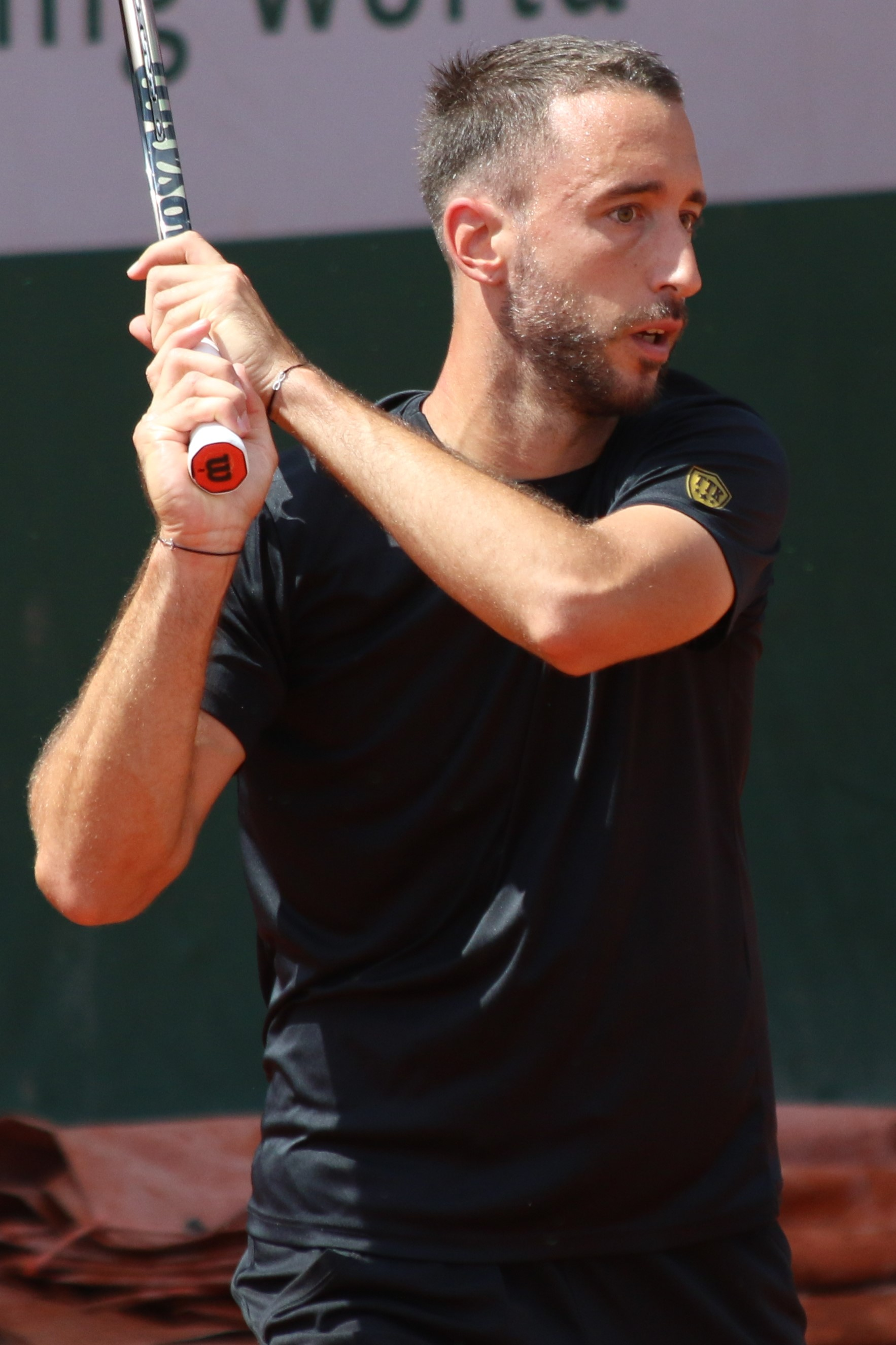
- Milojević at the 2022 French Open
- Country (sports): Serbia
- Residence: Belgrade, Serbia
- Born: 19 June 1995 (age 31) Belgrade, Serbia, FR Yugoslavia
- Height: 1.88 m (6 ft 2 in)
- Turned pro: 2013
- Plays: Right-handed (two-handed backhand)
- Coach: Marcos Roy
- Prize money: US $1,052,865

Singles
- Career record: 6–8
- Career titles: 0; 3 Challengers, 12 Futures
- Highest ranking: No. 125 (21 February 2022)

Grand Slam singles results
- Australian Open: 1R (2022)
- French Open: 2R (2020)
- Wimbledon: Q3 (2021)
- US Open: Q3 (2018)

Doubles
- Career record: 2–3
- Career titles: 0
- Highest ranking: No. 252 (18 February 2019)

Team competitions
- Davis Cup: 1–2 (Sin. 0–0, Dbs. 1–2)

Nikola Milojević (Serbian Cyrillic: Никола Милојевић, pronounced [nǐkola mǐlojeʋitɕ]; born 19 June 1995) is a Serbian professional tennis player. He has a career high ATP singles ranking of No. 125 achieved on 21 February 2022 and a career high ATP doubles ranking of No. 252 achieved on 18 February 2019. He reached his highest ranking of no. 1 in ITF Junior rankings on 7 January 2013.

== Career ==
=== Junior career (2008–2013) ===
As a junior, Milojević was a prodigious player who won several youth tournaments. He won his first title, the U14 Jug Open, on 25 May 2008, when he was still one month short of his 13th birthday. Between July and November 2008, Milojević reached five U14 finals in a row, winning three and losing two.

In 2009, Milojević dominated the U14 circuit in the Tennis Europe Junior Tour, starting off the season by winning a national title at the indoor championship held in Novi Sad, which was followed by a Category 1 title in Bolton. He then collected two of the most prestigious trophies of the year at Petits As and the European Junior Championships at Plzeň, beating Borna Ćorić and Kyle Edmund, respectively, in the finals. He also won titles in Maia (Portugal) and Livorno (Italy). He remained undefeated in his age group (Under 14), both on the domestic and world stage, until six months after his debut in the U14 circuit.

Before he turned 14, Milojević started competing in the ITF Junior Circuit in the under-18 category. In his first three tournaments, he reached the quarterfinals in all of them, including a semifinal in Riyadh, Saudi Arabia, in November 2009.

In 2012, Milojević won five ITF titles across all four surfaces, winning in Malaysia and Manila on hardcourts, in Halle (Westfalen) on grass, Nagoya on carpet, and in Mexico City on clay. He then kickstarted 2013 by winning the Copa del Cafe in Costa Rica, beating Tommy Mylnikov in the final. This triumph allowed him to become the world's No. 1 in the ITF Junior rankings, thus becoming the first Serbian to reach such a feat since Janko Tipsarević.

=== 2014: ATP debut ===
Milojević was a fifth player on a Serbian Davis Cup team in the first round tie against United States in the 2010 Davis Cup as well as a first round tie against Switzerland in 2014 and didn't play in any match.

Milojević made his ATP main draw debut as a wildcard at 2014 Düsseldorf Open, where he defeated Mirza Bašić in the first round before losing to eventual finalist, Ivo Karlović, in the second round.

=== 2017: Three Challengers finals, Top 150 debut ===
He was also invited for a semifinal clash against France in 2017, but instead chose to play in a Challenger tournament in order to improve his ATP ranking. He reached the top 150 on 2 October 2017.

=== 2018–19: Davis Cup debut, First & Second Challenger titles ===
In February 2018, he finally made his Davis Cup debut, partnered with another debutant, Miljan Zekić, in a doubles match against the US, losing 7–6^{(3)}, 2–6, 5–7, 4–6 in the first round.

In June 2018, Milojević won his first Challenger title in Fergana, Uzbekistan.

Milojević partnered with Danilo Petrović for the 2018 Davis Cup World Group play-offs vs. India in September. They defeated Rohan Bopanna/Saketh Myneni in straight sets to help secure Serbia a decisive 3–0 lead after second day's play. (Serbia eventually won the tie 4–0)

In August 2019, he won his third Challenger title at the 2019 Svijany Open in Liberec, Czechia.

=== 2020–21: ATP Cup champion & Major debut & first win, Challenger Third title & two finals ===
In January 2020, he was part of Serbian team that won the Inaugural ATP Cup by defeating Spain in the final.

In September 2020, Milojević reached the second round on his debut as a qualifier in a Grand Slam main draw at the 2020 French Open, where he won his first match against fellow Serbian Filip Krajinović in four sets 6–4, 3–6, 6–3, 6–1.

After winning his third Challenger title at the 2021 Zadar Open in Croatia by defeating Bulgarian Dimitar Kuzmanov, Milojević reached his best career-high ranking of No. 129 on 5 April 2021.

=== 2022: Australian Open debut, ATP quarterfinal and Top 125 debut ===
In January, Milojević qualified into the main draw of the 2022 Australian Open for the first time at this Major, but lost to Mackenzie McDonald in the opening round. After the Australian tour, he reached the quarterfinals as a lucky loser at the Córdoba Open where he lost to Juan Ignacio Londero. As a result, he reached the top 125 on 21 February 2022.

== Singles performance timeline ==
Key
W	F	SF	QF	#R	RR	Q#	DNQ	A	NH

(W) winner; (F) finalist; (SF) semifinalist; (QF) quarterfinalist; (#R) rounds 4, 3, 2, 1; (RR) round-robin stage; (Q#) qualification round; (DNQ) did not qualify; (A) absent; (NH) not held; (SR) strike rate (events won / competed); (W–L) win–loss record.
To avoid confusion and double counting, these charts are updated at the conclusion of a tournament or when the player's participation has ended.

Current through the 2023 French Open.

Tournament	2013	2014	2015	2016	2017	2018	2019	2020	2021	2022	2023	2024	SR	W–L	Win%
Grand Slam tournaments
Australian Open	A	A	A	A	Q1	Q1	Q1	Q3	Q2	1R	Q1	A	0 / 1	0–1	0%
French Open	A	A	A	Q1	A	Q1	Q2	2R	Q2	Q1	A		0 / 1	1–1	50%
Wimbledon	A	A	A	A	Q2	Q1	Q1	NH	Q3	Q1	A		0 / 0	0–0	0%
US Open	A	A	A	Q1	Q1	Q3	Q2	A	Q1	Q1	A		0 / 0	0–0	0%
Win–loss	0–0	0–0	0–0	0–0	0–0	0–0	0–0	1–1	0–0	0–1	0–0	0–0	0 / 2	1–2	33%
Career statistics
Tournaments	0	1	0	0	0	0	1	2	2	2	0	0	Career total: 8		
Overall win–loss	0–0	1–1	0–0	0–0	0–0	0–0	1–1	2–2	1–2	1–2	0–0	0–0	0 / 8	6–8	43%
Win %	–	50%	–	–	–	–	50%	50%	33%	33%	–	–	Career total: 43%		
Year-end ranking	703	385	240	238	158	174	155	138	136	259	797		$1,047,468		

== Team competition finals: 1 (1 title) ==
Result	W–L	Date	Team competition	Surface	Partner/Team	Opponents	Score
Win	1–0	Jan 2020	ATP Cup, Sydney, Australia	Hard	(Serbia) Novak Djokovic (Serbia) Dušan Lajović (Serbia) Viktor Troicki (Serbia) Nikola Ćaćić	(Spain) Rafael Nadal (Spain) Roberto Bautista Agut (Spain) Pablo Carreño Busta (Spain) Albert Ramos Viñolas (Spain) Feliciano López	2–1

== Challenger and Futures finals ==
=== Singles: 34 (15 titles, 19 runner–ups) ===
Legend (singles) ATP Challenger Tour (3–8) ITF Futures Tour / WTT (12–11)	Titles by surface Hard (12–11) Clay (3–8)	Titles by setting Outdoor (13–19) Indoor (2–0)

Result	W–L	Date	Tournament	Tier	Surface	Opponent	Score
Win	1–0	Sep 2013	Greece F12, Marathon	Futures	Hard	(Republic of Ireland) Louk Sorensen	w/o
Win	2–0	Mar 2014	Kazakhstan F3, Aktobe	Futures	Hard (i)	(Russia) Ilya Lebedev	7–6^{(7–5)}, 6–3
Loss	2–1	Jun 2014	Turkey F19, Bodrum	Futures	Clay	(United States) Jared Donaldson	3–6, 4–6
Loss	2–2	Jul 2014	China F9, Zhangjiagang	Futures	Hard	(China) Li Zhe	2–6, 2–6
Win	3–2	Aug 2014	Turkey F27, Ankara	Futures	Clay	(Australia) Gavin van Peperzeel	7–5, 7–5
Loss	3–3	Feb 2015	Turkey F5, Antalya	Futures	Hard	(Italy) Riccardo Bellotti	6–7^{(2–7)}, 5–7
Loss	3–4	Feb 2015	Egypt F6, Sharm El Sheikh	Futures	Hard	(Czech Republic) Jaroslav Pospíšil	4–6, 4–6
Loss	3–5	Apr 2015	Greece F2, Heraklion	Futures	Hard	(Serbia) Peđa Krstin	4–6, 6–7^{(3–7)}
Loss	3–6	Jun 2015	Uzbekistan F3, Andijan	Futures	Hard	(Ukraine) Denys Molchanov	6–2, 6–7^{(3–7)}, 4–6
Loss	3–7	Aug 2015	Switzerland F3, Geneva	Futures	Clay	(Italy) Roberto Marcora	4–6, 2–6
Win	4–7	Sep 2015	Tunisia F24, El Kantaoui	Futures	Hard	(Germany) Jannis Kahlke	6–3, 6–1
Win	5–7	Nov 2015	Tunisia F31, El Kantaoui	Futures	Hard	(France) Antoine Hoang	2–6, 7–5, 6–4
Win	6–7	Nov 2015	Tunisia F32, El Kantaoui	Futures	Hard	(France) Alexandre Müller	6–2, 6–3
Win	7–7	Dec 2015	Tunisia F35, El Kantaoui	Futures	Hard	(Tunisia) Anis Ghorbel	6–3, 7–5
Win	8–7	Dec 2015	Tunisia F36, El Kantaoui	Futures	Hard	(Tunisia) Anis Ghorbel	6–2, 4–6, 6–3
Loss	8–8	Feb 2016	Egypt F3, Sharm El Sheikh	Futures	Hard	(Egypt) Karim-Mohamed Maamoun	6–7^{(5–7)}, 6–2, 4–6
Win	9–8	Feb 2016	Egypt F4, Sharm El Sheikh	Futures	Hard	(France) Laurent Rochette	6–2, 6–4
Loss	9–9	Jun 2016	Tunisia F21, Hammamet	Futures	Clay	(Chile) Cristian Garín	4–6, 6–2, 0–6
Win	10–9	Aug 2016	Egypt F18, Sharm El Sheikh	Futures	Hard	(Australia) Bradley Mousley	3–6, 6–3, 6–3
Loss	10–10	Oct 2016	Turkey F41, Antalya	Futures	Hard	(Slovakia) Alex Molčan	4–6, 5–7
Loss	10–11	Jan 2017	Nouméa, New Caledonia	Challenger	Hard	(France) Adrian Mannarino	3–6, 5–7
Loss	10–12	Feb 2017	Tempe, USA	Challenger	Hard	(United States) Tennys Sandgren	6–4, 0–6, 3–6
Loss	10–13	Jun 2017	Fergana, Uzbekistan	Challenger	Hard	(Belarus) Ilya Ivashka	4–6, 3–6
Win	11–13	Jul 2017	China F14, Tianjin	Futures	Hard	(China) Li Zhe	6–4, 6–2
Win	12–13	Feb 2018	Kazakhstan F2, Shymkent	Futures	Hard (i)	(Uzbekistan) Sanjar Fayziev	6–2, 5–7, 7–6^{(8–6)}
Win	13–13	Jun 2018	Fergana, Uzbekistan	Challenger	Hard	(Spain) Enrique López Pérez	6–3, 6–4
Loss	13–14	Oct 2018	Almaty, Kazakhstan	Challenger	Hard	(Uzbekistan) Denis Istomin	7–6^{(7–4)}, 6–7^{(5–7)}, 2–6
Loss	13–15	Apr 2019	Barletta, Italy	Challenger	Clay	(Italy) Gianluca Mager	6–7^{(4–7)}, 7–5, 2–3 ret.
Win	14–15	Aug 2019	Liberec, Czech Republic	Challenger	Clay	(Brazil) Rogério Dutra Silva	6–3, 3–6, 6–4
Win	15–15	Mar 2021	Zadar, Croatia	Challenger	Clay	(Bulgaria) Dimitar Kuzmanov	2–6, 6–2, 7–6^{(7–5)}
Loss	15–16	Sep 2021	Banja Luka, Bosnia and Herzegovina	Challenger	Clay	(Argentina) Juan Manuel Cerúndolo	3-6, 1-6
Loss	15–17	Sep 2021	Braga, Portugal	Challenger	Clay	(Brazil) Thiago Monteiro	5-7, 5-7
Loss	15–18	June 2022	Blois, France	Challenger	Clay	(France) Alexandre Müller	6–7^{(3–7)}, 1–6
Loss	15–19	Nov 2024	M15 Sharm El Sheikh, Egypt	WTT	Clay	(Egypt) Mohamed Safwat	3–6, 2–6
