= Zadar Open =

- 2026 Zadar Open

ATP Challenger Tour
- Event name: Zadar Open
- Founded: 2021
- Editions: 6 (2026)
- Location: Zadar, Croatia
- Venue: Falkensteiner Resort Punta Skala
- Category: ATP Challenger 75
- Surface: Clay
- Prize money: €74.825 (2024), €91,250 (2025)
- Website: Website

Current champions (2026)
- Singles: (Italy) Stefano Travaglia
- Doubles: (Ecuador) Gonzalo Escobar (Croatia) Nino Serdarušić

The Zadar Open is a professional tennis tournament played on outdoor clay courts. It is currently part of the ATP Challenger Tour. It is held in Zadar, Croatia since 2021.

== Past finals ==
=== Singles ===
Year	Champion	Runner-up	Score
2026	(Italy) Stefano Travaglia	(France) Arthur Géa	2–1 ret.
2025	(Croatia) Borna Ćorić	(France) Valentin Royer	3–6, 6–2, 6–3
2024	(Slovakia) Jozef Kovalík	(Bulgaria) Adrian Andreev	6–4, 6–2
2023	(Italy) Alessandro Giannessi	(Austria) Sebastian Ofner	6–4, 5–7, 7–6^{(8–6)}
2022	(Italy) Flavio Cobolli	(Poland) Daniel Michalski	6–4, 6–2
2021	(Serbia) Nikola Milojević	(Bulgaria) Dimitar Kuzmanov	2–6, 6–2, 7–6^{(7–5)}

=== Doubles ===
Year	Champions	Runners-up	Score
2026	(Ecuador) Gonzalo Escobar (Croatia) Nino Serdarušić	(Italy) Simone Agostini (Czech Republic) Jonáš Forejtek	6–1, 6–2
2025	(Czech Republic) Zdeněk Kolář (Austria) Neil Oberleitner	(Ukraine) Denys Molchanov (Netherlands) Mick Veldheer	6–3, 6–4
2024	(France) Manuel Guinard (France) Grégoire Jacq	(Czech Republic) Roman Jebavý (Czech Republic) Zdeněk Kolář	6–4, 6–4
2023	(France) Manuel Guinard (Croatia) Nino Serdarušić	(Serbia) Ivan Sabanov (Serbia) Matej Sabanov	6–4, 6–0
2022	(Czech Republic) Zdeněk Kolář (Italy) Andrea Vavassori	(Italy) Franco Agamenone (France) Manuel Guinard	3–6, 7–6^{(9–7)}, [10–6]
2021	(Slovenia) Blaž Kavčič (Slovenia) Blaž Rola	(Slovakia) Lukáš Klein (Slovakia) Alex Molčan	2–6, 6–2, [10–3]
