= Nino Serdarušić =

Croatian tennis player

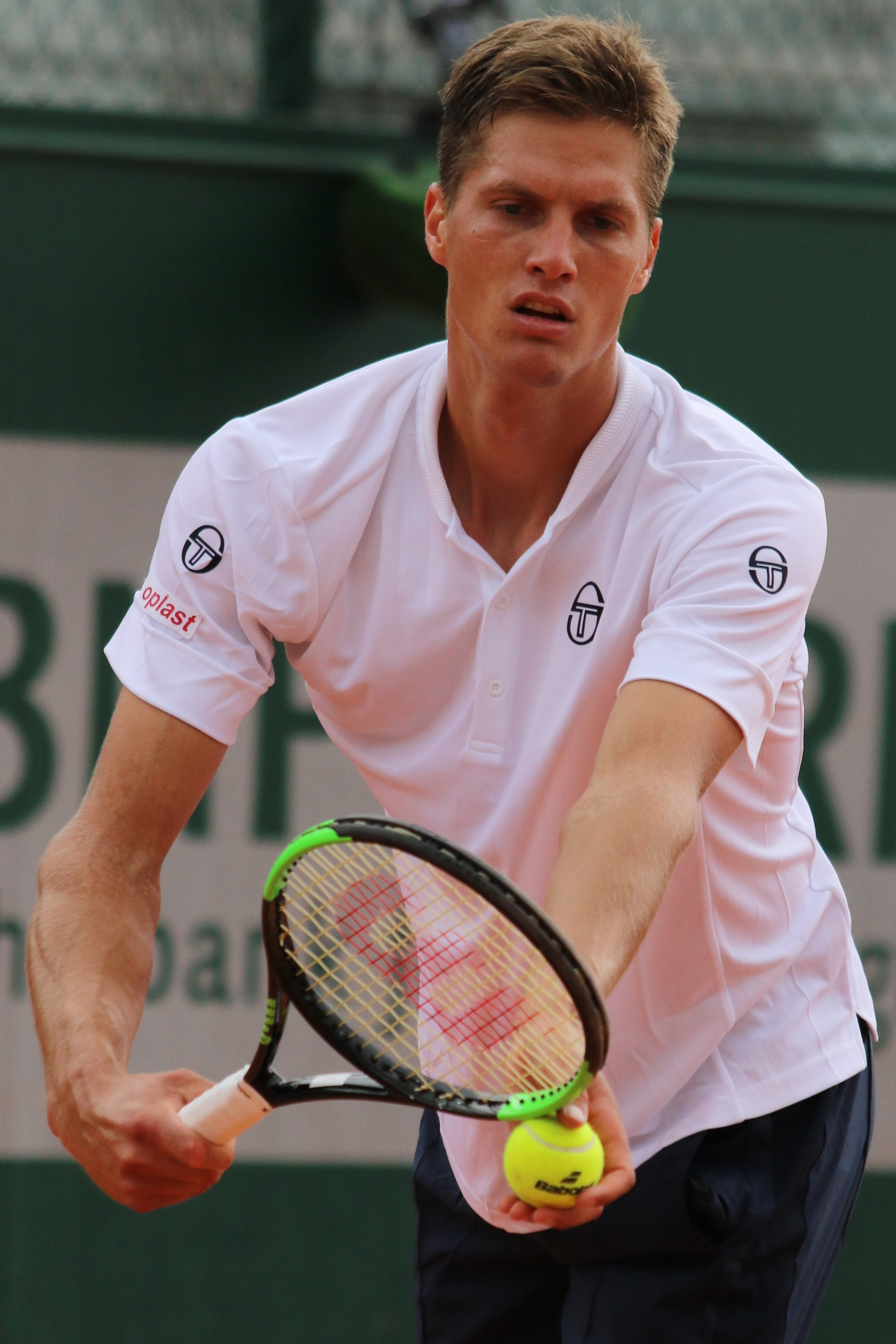
- Serdarušić at the 2019 French Open
- Full name: Nino Serdarušić
- Country (sports): Croatia
- Residence: Zagreb, Croatia
- Born: 13 December 1996 (age 29) Zagreb, Croatia
- Height: 1.91 m (6 ft 3 in)
- Turned pro: 2014
- Plays: Right-handed (two-handed backhand)
- Coach: Filip Serdarušić
- Prize money: US $586,012

Singles
- Career record: 2–8
- Career titles: 0
- Highest ranking: No. 167 (27 June 2022)

Grand Slam singles results
- Australian Open: Q1 (2022, 2023)
- French Open: Q3 (2022)
- Wimbledon: Q1 (2018, 2022)
- US Open: Q1 (2018, 2022)

Doubles
- Career record: 7–8
- Career titles: 1
- Highest ranking: No. 83 (14 September 2026)
- Current ranking: No. 83 (14 September 2026)

Team competitions
- Davis Cup: F (2021)
- Last updated on: 14 September 2026.

Nino Serdarušić (Croatian pronunciation: [nǐːno serdǎruʃitɕ]; born 13 December 1996) is a Croatian tennis player. He has a career-high doubles ranking of world No. 83 achieved on 14 September 2026 and a singles ranking of No. 167 achieved on 27 June 2022.

== Career ==
=== 2014-2015: Wimbledon Junior semifinal, Pro debut ===
Serdarušić had a career high junior ranking of No. 21, and partnering Petros Chrysochos, made the doubles semifinals of the 2014 Wimbledon Championships boys' doubles.

He made his ATP doubles main draw debut at the 2014 ATP Vegeta Croatia Open Umag, partnering Dino Marcan, losing in the first round to the second seeds Pablo Cuevas and Horacio Zeballos in three sets.

=== 2016: ATP singles debut ===
In 2016, he made his first appearance in an ATP singles draw, also in the Croatia Open but lost in straight sets to Teymuraz Gabashvili.

=== 2018-2021: First Challenger finals ===
In 2018, he reached his first Challenger final in Ostrava, Czechia but lost to Arthur De Greef in three sets.

In 2021, he reached his second Challenger final in Verona, Italy where he was defeated by Holger Rune.

=== 2023-2026: ATP doubles title and top 100 ===
In May 2023 at the 2023 Geneva Open he qualified for the main draw but lost to Christopher O'Connell. In July 2023, Serdarusic won his first title at the ATP 250 2023 Croatia Open Umag with Blaž Rola.

== Personal life ==
In 2022, after losing in Australian Open qualifying, his brother and coach, Filip Serdarušić, was deported due to being unvaccinated.

== ATP Tour finals ==
=== Doubles: 1 (title) ===
Legend Grand Slam (0–0) ATP 1000 (0–0) ATP 500 (0–0) ATP 250 (1–0)	Finals by surface Hard (0–0) Clay (1–0) Grass (0–0)	Finals by setting Outdoor (1–0) Indoor (0–0)

Result	W–L	Date	Tournament	Tier	Surface	Partner	Opponents	Score
Win	1–0	Jul 2023	Croatia Open, Croatia	ATP 250	Clay	(Slovenia) Blaž Rola	(Italy) Simone Bolelli (Italy) Andrea Vavassori	4–6, 7–6^{(7–2)}, [15–13]

== ATP Challenger Tour finals ==
=== Singles: 5 (5 runner-ups) ===
Legend ATP Challenger Tour (0–5)	Finals by surface Hard (0–0) Clay (0–5)

Result	W–L	Date	Tournament	Tier	Surface	Opponent	Score
Loss	0–1	May 2018	Prosperita Open, Czech Republic	Challenger	Clay	(Belgium) Arthur De Greef	6–4, 4–6, 2–6
Loss	0–2	Aug 2021	Internazionali di Tennis Verona, Italy	Challenger	Clay	(Denmark) Holger Rune	4–6, 2–6
Loss	0–3	Aug 2021	Polish Cup, Poland	Challenger	Clay	(Argentina) Camilo Ugo Carabelli	4–6, 2–6
Loss	0–4	Mar 2022	Open de Oeiras, Portugal	Challenger	Clay	(Portugal) Gastão Elias	3–6, 4–6
Loss	0–5	Mar 2023	Kiskút Open, Hungary	Challenger	Clay (i)	(Serbia) Hamad Medjedovic	4–6, 3–6

=== Doubles: 18 (12 titles, 6 runner-ups) ===
Legend ATP Challenger Tour (12–6)	Finals by surface Hard (0–2) Clay (12–4)

Result	W–L	Date	Tournament	Tier	Surface	Partner	Opponents	Score
Loss	0–1	Aug 2016	Tilia Slovenia Open, Slovenia	Challenger	Hard (i)	(Croatia) Tomislav Draganja	(Belarus) Sergey Betov (Belarus) Ilya Ivashka	6–1, 3–6, [4–10]
Loss	0–2	Oct 2017	Almaty Challenger, Kazakhstan	Challenger	Clay	(Russia) Ivan Gakhov	(Kazakhstan) Timur Khabibulin (Kazakhstan) Aleksandr Nedovyesov	6–1, 3–6, [3–10]
Win	1–2	Sep 2021	Banja Luka Challenger, Bosnia and Herzegovina	Challenger	Clay	(Croatia) Antonio Šančić	(Croatia) Ivan Sabanov (Croatia) Matej Sabanov	6–3, 6–3
Loss	1–3	Oct 2021	Tennis Napoli Cup, Italy	Challenger	Clay	(Bosnia and Herzegovina) Mirza Bašić	(Germany) Dustin Brown (Italy) Andrea Vavassori	5–7, 6–7^{(5–7)}
Loss	1–4	Feb 2023	Chennai Open, India	Challenger	Hard	(Austria) Sebastian Ofner	(United Kingdom) Jay Clarke (India) Arjun Kadhe	0–6, 4–6
Win	2–4	Mar 2023	Zadar Open, Croatia	Challenger	Clay	(France) Manuel Guinard	(Serbia) Ivan Sabanov (Serbia) Matej Sabanov	6–4, 6–0
Win	3–4	May 2025	Zagreb Open, Croatia	Challenger	Clay	(Croatia) Matej Dodig	(Croatia) Luka Mikrut (Croatia) Mili Poljičak	6–4, 6–4
Win	4–4	Jun 2025	Royan Open, France	Challenger	Clay	(Croatia) Matej Dodig	(India) Adil Kalyanpur (India) Parikshit Somani	7–5, 6–7^{(4–7)}, [12–10]
Win	5–4	Aug 2025	Sofia Challenger, Bulgaria	Challenger	Clay	(Austria) David Pichler	(Romania) Alexandru Jecan (Romania) Bogdan Pavel	4–6, 7–6^{(7–2)}, [10–7]
Win	6–4	Sep 2025	Layjet Open, Austria	Challenger	Clay	(Austria) David Pichler	(Czech Republic) Jiří Barnat (Czech Republic) Filip Duda	6–3, 6–3
Loss	6–5	Nov 2025	Maia Challenger, Portugal	Challenger	Clay (i)	(France) Théo Arribagé	(Bulgaria) Alexander Donski (Portugal) Tiago Pereira	2–6, 6–7^{(6–8)}
Win	7–5	Mar 2026	Zadar Open, Croatia	Challenger	Clay	(Ecuador) Gonzalo Escobar	(Italy) Simone Agostini (Czech Republic) Jonáš Forejtek	6–1, 6–2
Win	8–5	May 2026	Košice Open, Slovakia	Challenger	Clay	(Slovakia) Miloš Karol	(Slovakia) Lukáš Pokorný (Czech Republic) David Poljak	5–7, 7–6^{(7–4)}, [10–5]
Win	9–5	Jul 2026	Internazionali di Tennis Città di Trieste, Italy	Challenger	Clay	(Croatia) Admir Kalender	(Netherlands) Jarno Jans (United Kingdom) Mark Whitehouse	7–6^{(7–4)}, 6–4
Win	10–5	Aug 2026	Platzmann Open, Germany	Challenger	Clay	(Croatia) Admir Kalender	(United Kingdom) Finn Bass (Netherlands) Jarno Jans	6–4, 3–6, [13–11]
Win	11–5	Aug 2026	Hamburg Ladies & Gents Cup, Germany	Challenger	Clay	(Croatia) Admir Kalender	(Germany) Niels McDonald (Germany) Jannik Opitz	6–3, 6–4
Win	12–5	Aug 2026	Como Lake Challenger, Italy	Challenger	Clay	(Croatia) Admir Kalender	(Poland) Karol Drzewiecki (Poland) Piotr Matuszewski	6–3, 6–4
Loss	12–6	Sep 2026	AON Open Challenger, Italy	Challenger	Clay	(Croatia) Admir Kalender	(Serbia) Stefan Latinović (Croatia) Mili Poljičak	6–7^{(1–7)}, 7–6^{(7–3)}, [6–10]

== ITF Futures/World Tennis Tour finals ==
=== Singles: 20 (8 titles, 12 runner-ups) ===
Legend ITF Futures/WTT (8–12)	Finals by surface Hard (0–0) Clay (8–12)

Result	W–L	Date	Tournament	Tier	Surface	Opponent	Score
Loss	0–1	Mar 2016	Croatia F4, Opatija	Futures	Clay	(Romania) Dragoș Dima	1–6, 1–6
Loss	0–2	May 2016	Bosnia and Herzegovina F1, Doboj	Futures	Clay	(Croatia) Kristijan Mesaroš	1–6, 1–6
Loss	0–3	Oct 2016	Croatia F8, Solin	Futures	Clay	(France) Corentin Moutet	2–6, 6–7^{(1–7)}
Loss	0–4	May 2017	Bosnia and Herzegovina F1, Doboj	Futures	Clay	(Italy) Fabrizio Ornago	1–3 ret.
Loss	0–5	Jul 2017	North Macedonia F1, Skopje	Futures	Clay	(Austria) Maximilian Neuchrist	3–6, 5–7
Loss	0–6	Aug 2017	North Macedonia F2, Skopje	Futures	Clay	(Chinese Taipei) Yang Tsung-hua	6–7^{(2–7)}, 6–4, 3–6
Win	1–6	Aug 2017	Serbia F1, Novi Sad	Futures	Clay	(Italy) Antonio Massara	6–1, 6–4
Loss	1–7	Aug 2017	Serbia F2, Novi Sad	Futures	Clay	(Bosnia and Herzegovina) Tomislav Brkić	2–6, 7–6^{(7–5)}, 3–6
Win	2–7	Sep 2017	Serbia F4, Zlatibor	Futures	Clay	(Argentina) Manuel Peña López	6–3, 6–2
Win	3–7	Sep 2017	Serbia F5, Novi Sad	Futures	Clay	(Croatia) Domagoj Bilješko	6–2, 6–2
Win	4–7	Oct 2017	Tunisia F31, Hammamet	Futures	Clay	(Canada) Steven Diez	6–3, 3–6, 6–4
Win	5–7	Nov 2017	Tunisia F34, Hammamet	Futures	Clay	(Spain) Eduard Esteve Lobato	6–4, 5–7, 6–2
Loss	5–8	Nov 2017	Tunisia F36, Hammamet	Futures	Clay	(Spain) Oriol Roca Batalla	4–6, 1–6
Loss	5–9	Feb 2018	Turkey F5, Antalya	Futures	Clay	(Spain) Enrique López Pérez	3–6, 3–6
Win	6–9	Mar 2018	Croatia F1, Rovinj	Futures	Clay	(Spain) Javier Barranco Cosano	6–7^{(4–7)}, 6–2, 6–4
Loss	6–10	Mar 2018	Croatia F3, Opatija	Futures	Clay	(France) Geoffrey Blancaneaux	2–6, 6–3, 2–6
Win	7–10	Apr 2018	Turkey F14, Antalya	Futures	Clay	(Czech Republic) Jaroslav Pospíšil	6–2, 2–6, 6–3
Win	8–10	Apr 2018	Turkey F15, Antalya	Futures	Clay	(Germany) Rudolf Molleker	7–5, 6–2
Loss	8–11	Oct 2019	M25 Santa Margherita di Pula, Italy	WTT	Clay	(Bosnia and Herzegovina) Nerman Fatić	2–6, 1–6
Loss	8–12	Mar 2024	M25 Santa Margherita di Pula, Italy	WTT	Clay	(France) Valentin Royer	3–6, 3–6

=== Doubles: 32 (25 titles, 7 runner-ups) ===
Legend ITF Futures/WTT (25–7)	Finals by surface Hard (5–1) Clay (20–6) Grass (0–0)

Result	W–L	Date	Tournament	Tier	Surface	Partner	Opponents	Score
Win	1–0	May 2015	Bosnia and Herzegovina F1, Doboj	Futures	Clay	(Croatia) Joško Topić	(Ukraine) Danylo Kalenichenko (Slovakia) Juraj Masar	2–6, 6–4, [12–10]
Win	2–0	Aug 2015	Serbia F8, Novi Sad	Futures	Clay	(Slovakia) Martin Blasko	(Czech Republic) Filip Dolezel (Czech Republic) Dominik Kellovský	6–4, 6–4
Win	3–0	Sep 2015	Serbia F11, Zlatibor	Futures	Clay	(Serbia) Danilo Petrović	(Serbia) Luka Ilić (Serbia) Darko Jandrić	6–3, 6–7^{(3–7)}, [12–10]
Win	4–0	Sep 2015	Serbia F12, Niš	Futures	Clay	(Serbia) Danilo Petrović	(France) Florent Diep (Germany) Pirmin Hänle	6–1, 6–2
Loss	4–1	Oct 2015	Croatia F18, Solin	Futures	Clay	(United States) Stefan Kozlov	(Czech Republic) Zdeněk Kolář (Czech Republic) Tomas Toman	4–6, 6–2, [6–10]
Win	5–1	Nov 2015	Cyprus F1, Nicosia	Futures	Hard	(Cyprus) Petros Chrysochos	(Belgium) Alexandre Folie (Slovakia) Adrian Sikora	6–3, 3–6, [11–9]
Win	6–1	Nov 2015	Cyprus F2, Limassol	Futures	Hard	(Cyprus) Petros Chrysochos	(Spain) Andrés Artuñedo (Canada) Steven Diez	1–6, 6–4, [10–3]
Win	7–1	Mar 2016	Croatia F1, Rovinj	Futures	Clay	(Serbia) Danilo Petrović	(Italy) Omar Giacalone (Italy) Pietro Rondoni	6–1, 7–5
Win	8–1	Mar 2016	Croatia F4, Opatija	Futures	Clay	(Croatia) Tomislav Draganja	(Croatia) Ivan Sabanov (Croatia) Matej Sabanov	6–4, 7–6^{(12–10)}
Win	9–1	May 2016	Bosnia and Herzegovina F1, Doboj	Futures	Clay	(Romania) Victor Vlad Cornea	(Ukraine) Danylo Kalenichenko (Austria) David Pichler	6–0, 2–6, [10–8]
Win	10–1	Jun 2016	Bosnia and Herzegovina F4, Sarajevo	Futures	Clay	(Croatia) Tomislav Draganja	(Croatia) Ivan Sabanov (Croatia) Matej Sabanov	7–5, 6–3
Loss	10–2	Jul 2016	North Macedonia F2, Skopje	Futures	Clay	(Czech Republic) Libor Salaba	(North Macedonia) Tomislav Jotovski (Bulgaria) Alexandar Lazov	2–6, 6–3, [6–10]
Win	11–2	Sep 2016	Serbia F8, Sokobanja	Futures	Clay	(Argentina) Matias Zukas	(Germany) Nils Brinkmann (Serbia) Dejan Katić	6–2, 6–4
Loss	11–3	Oct 2016	Croatia F9, Bol	Futures	Clay	(Slovenia) Nik Razboršek	(Austria) Pascal Brunner (Austria) Lucas Miedler	2–6, 2–6
Win	12–3	Oct 2016	Croatia F9, Bol	Futures	Clay	(Croatia) Borna Gojo	(Serbia) Ivan Bjelica (Serbia) Darko Jandrić	6–3, 6–7^{(11–13)}, [10–5]
Win	13–3	Jan 2017	Turkey F1, Antalya	Futures	Hard	(Norway) Viktor Durasovic	(United Kingdom) Liam Broady (United Kingdom) Luke Johnson	6–3, 6–3
Win	14–3	Jan 2017	Turkey F3, Antalya	Futures	Hard	(Romania) Victor Vlad Cornea	(Ukraine) Vadim Alekseenko (Colombia) Felipe Mantilla	6–3, 6–1
Win	15–3	Feb 2017	China F1, Anning	Futures	Clay	(Italy) Marco Bortolotti	(Australia) Thomas Fancutt (Australia) Brandon Walkin	6–7^{(6–8)}, 6–3, [10–8]
Win	16–3	Mar 2017	Croatia F2, Poreč	Futures	Clay	(Czech Republic) Zdeněk Kolář	(Croatia) Ivan Sabanov (Croatia) Matej Sabanov	6–3, 6–3
Win	17–3	Mar 2017	Croatia F3, Umag	Futures	Clay	(Czech Republic) Zdeněk Kolář	(Argentina) Hernán Casanova (Argentina) Juan Pablo Ficovich	7–5, 6–0
Win	18–3	Apr 2017	Kazakhstan F4, Shymkent	Futures	Clay	(Czech Republic) Zdeněk Kolář	(Spain) Mario Vilella Martínez (Russia) Alexander Zhurbin	6–2, 6–2
Loss	18–4	May 2017	Hungary F2, Zamárdi	Futures	Clay	(Croatia) Domagoj Bilješko	(Austria) Pascal Brunner (Austria) David Pichler	5–7, 4–6
Loss	18–5	Aug 2017	Serbia F1, Novi Sad	Futures	Clay	(Hungary) Gábor Borsos	(Australia) Dane Propoggia (Australia) Scott Puodziunas	3–6, 5–7
Win	19–5	Oct 2017	Tunisia F30, Hammamet	Futures	Clay	(Italy) Cristian Carli	(Brazil) Rafael Matos (Brazil) Marcelo Zormann	6–7^{(6–8)}, 6–4, [10–7]
Win	20–5	Nov 2017	Tunisia F34, Hammamet	Futures	Clay	(Serbia) Nikola Ćaćić	(Spain) Marc Giner (Spain) Jaume Pla Malfeito	6–2, 6–1
Win	21–5	Nov 2017	Tunisia F35, Hammamet	Futures	Clay	(Serbia) Nikola Ćaćić	(Tunisia) Moez Echargui (Tunisia) Anis Ghorbel	7–5, 6–3
Win	22–5	Feb 2018	Turkey F4, Antalya	Futures	Clay	(Austria) Pascal Brunner	(Italy) Flavio Cipolla (Spain) Enrique López Pérez	6–3, 6–2
Win	23–5	Jan 2025	M25 Antalya, Turkey	WTT	Clay	(Czech Republic) Zdeněk Kolář	(Italy) Manuel Mazza (Italy) Andrea Picchione	6–3, 7–6^{(7–4)}
Win	24–5	Feb 2025	M25 Antalya, Turkey	WTT	Clay	(Czech Republic) Zdeněk Kolář	Ivan Gretskiy (Romania) Gabriel Gheţu	6–0, 6–2
Loss	24–6	Feb 2025	M25 Trento, Italy	WTT	Hard (i)	(Croatia) Admir Kalender	(Czech Republic) Jan Jermář (France) Dan Added	4–6, 4–6
Loss	24–7	May 2025	M25 Bol, Croatia	WTT	Clay	(Croatia) Matej Dodig	(Croatia) Admir Kalender; Pavel Verbin	6–3, 4–6, [6–10]
Win	25–7	Jul 2025	M15 Nova Gorica, Slovenia	WTT	Clay	(Croatia) Admir Kalender	(Netherlands) Stijn Pel (United States) Oren Vasser	6–1, 6–4
