= 2024 NÖ Open – Doubles =

Doubles
- 2024 NÖ Open

Final
- Champions: (Slovakia) Miloš Karol (Ukraine) Vitaliy Sachko
- Runners-up: (Poland) Karol Drzewiecki (Poland) Piotr Matuszewski
- Score: 6–4, 2–6, [11–9]

Events
Singles	Doubles
- NÖ Open

Zdeněk Kolář and Blaž Rola were the defending champions but only Rola chose to defend his title, partnering Mohamed Safwat. They lost in the first round to Gerald Melzer and Lukas Neumayer.

Miloš Karol and Vitaliy Sachko won the title after defeating Karol Drzewiecki and Piotr Matuszewski 6–4, 2–6, [11–9] in the final.

== Seeds ==
1. (Germany) Jakob Schnaitter / (Germany) Mark Wallner (first round)
2. (Poland) Karol Drzewiecki / (Poland) Piotr Matuszewski (final)
3. (Sweden) Filip Bergevi / (Netherlands) Mick Veldheer (first round)
4. (Czech Republic) Andrew Paulson / (Czech Republic) Michael Vrbenský (quarterfinals)

== Draw ==
Key

- Q = Qualifier
- WC = Wild card
- LL = Lucky loser
- Alt = Alternate
- ITF = ITF entry
- PR = Protected ranking
- SR = Special ranking
- SE = Special exempt
- JE = Junior exempt
- JR = Junior Accelerator Programme entrant
- CO = College Accelerator Programme entrant
- NG = Next Gen Accelerator Program entrant
- w/o = Walkover
- r = Retired
- d = Defaulted

=== Draw ===
First round
1	(Germany) J Schnaitter (Germany) M Wallner	4	3
(Austria) N Oberleitner (Austria) J Schwärzler	6	6
WC	(Austria) G Melzer (Austria) L Neumayer	7	6
PR	(Slovenia) B Rola (Egypt) M Safwat	5	4
3	(Sweden) F Bergevi (Netherlands) M Veldheer	6^{4}	5
(Slovakia) M Karol (Ukraine) V Sachko	7^{7}	7
(United Kingdom) S Duncan (United Kingdom) J MacKinlay	5	6	[8]
(United States) Nicholas Bybel (United Kingdom) O Crawford	7	3	[10]
(Germany) D Masur (Germany) K Wehnelt	6	6
(Austria) M Neuchrist (Austria) S Weissborn	3	2
(Czech Republic) F Duda (Czech Republic) V Kopřiva	5	7^{7}	[5]
4	(Czech Republic) A Paulson (Czech Republic) M Vrbenský	7	6^{5}	[10]
WC	(Austria) S Kopp (Austria) Matthias Ujvary	7^{7}	7^{9}
(Germany) R Molleker; A Vatutin	6^{2}	6^{7}

Quarterfinals
(Austria) N Oberleitner (Austria) J Schwärzler	6	3	[8]
WC	(Austria) G Melzer (Austria) L Neumayer	4	6	[10]
(Slovakia) M Karol (Ukraine) V Sachko	5	6	[10]
(United States) N Bybel (United Kingdom) O Crawford	7	4	[8]
(Germany) D Masur (Germany) K Wehnelt	2	6	[11]
4	(Czech Republic) A Paulson (Czech Republic) M Vrbenský	6	2	[9]
WC	(Austria) S Kopp (Austria) M Ujvary	4	3
2	(Poland) K Drzewiecki (Poland) P Matuszewski	6	6

Semifinals
WC	(Austria) G Melzer (Austria) L Neumayer	3	1
(Slovakia) M Karol (Ukraine) V Sachko	6	6
(Germany) D Masur (Germany) K Wehnelt	1	2
2	(Poland) K Drzewiecki (Poland) P Matuszewski	6	6

Final
(Slovakia) M Karol (Ukraine) V Sachko	6	2	[11]
2	(Poland) K Drzewiecki (Poland) P Matuszewski	4	6	[9]
