= 2025 NÖ Open – Doubles =

Doubles
- 2025 NÖ Open

Final
- Champions: (Austria) Neil Oberleitner (Austria) Joel Schwärzler
- Runners-up: (Ukraine) Oleg Prihodko (Ukraine) Vitaliy Sachko
- Score: 5–7, 6–3, [10–7]

Events
Singles	Doubles
- NÖ Open

Miloš Karol and Vitaliy Sachko were the defending champions but only Sachko chose to defend his title, partnering Oleg Prihodko. They lost in the final to Neil Oberleitner and Joel Schwärzler.

Oberleitner and Schwärzler won the title after defeating Prihodko and Sachko 5–7, 6–3, [10–7] in the final.

== Seeds ==
1. (Czech Republic) Andrew Paulson / (Czech Republic) Michael Vrbenský (first round)
2. (Czech Republic) Zdeněk Kolář / (Ukraine) Denys Molchanov (quarterfinals)
3. (Romania) Victor Vlad Cornea / (Argentina) Santiago Rodríguez Taverna (quarterfinals)
4. (Netherlands) Mats Hermans / (Portugal) Tiago Pereira (quarterfinals)

== Draw ==
Key

- Q = Qualifier
- WC = Wild card
- LL = Lucky loser
- Alt = Alternate
- ITF = ITF entry
- PR = Protected ranking
- SR = Special ranking
- SE = Special exempt
- JE = Junior exempt
- JR = Junior Accelerator Programme entrant
- CO = College Accelerator Programme entrant
- NG = Next Gen Accelerator Program entrant
- w/o = Walkover
- r = Retired
- d = Defaulted

=== Draw ===
First round
1	(Czech Republic) A Paulson (Czech Republic) M Vrbenský	4	6	[3]
(Croatia) M Poljičak (Croatia) N Serdarušić	6	2	[10]
WC	(Austria) Bastian Berenz (Austria) Gregor Ramskogler	5	7^{7}	[5]
(Ukraine) O Prihodko (Ukraine) V Sachko	7	6^{5}	[10]
3	(Romania) V Cornea (Argentina) S Rodríguez Taverna	6	7^{7}
(Czech Republic) Jiří Barnat (Czech Republic) D Poljak	4	6^{3}
(Czech Republic) Jakub Nicod (Netherlands) J Sels	6^{6}	1
(Austria) S Kopp (Austria) L Neumayer	7^{8}	6
(Austria) N Oberleitner (Austria) J Schwärzler	w/o
I Gakhov; A Vatutin
WC	(Germany) R Molleker (Austria) D Novak	3	2
4	(Netherlands) M Hermans (Portugal) T Pereira	6	6
(Czech Republic) J Jermář (Germany) K Wehnelt	1	6	[7]
(Croatia) L Mikrut (Germany) M Topo	6	3	[10]
(Zimbabwe) CJ Lock (Argentina) M Trungelliti	6	5	[8]
2	(Czech Republic) Z Kolář (Ukraine) D Molchanov	3	7	[10]

Quarterfinals
(Croatia) M Poljičak (Croatia) N Serdarušić	6^{4}	6	[5]
(Ukraine) O Prihodko (Ukraine) V Sachko	7^{7}	1	[10]
3	(Romania) V Cornea (Argentina) S Rodríguez Taverna	3	6	[7]
(Austria) S Kopp (Austria) L Neumayer	6	1	[10]
(Austria) N Oberleitner (Austria) J Schwärzler	7^{7}	6
4	(Netherlands) M Hermans (Portugal) T Pereira	6^{5}	2
(Croatia) L Mikrut (Germany) M Topo	7	2	[12]
2	(Czech Republic) Z Kolář (Ukraine) D Molchanov	5	6	[10]

Semifinals
(Ukraine) O Prihodko (Ukraine) V Sachko	6^{6}	6	[10]
(Austria) S Kopp (Austria) L Neumayer	7^{8}	3	[6]
(Austria) N Oberleitner (Austria) J Schwärzler	7	6^{1}	[10]
(Croatia) L Mikrut (Germany) M Topo	5	7^{7}	[6]

Final
(Ukraine) O Prihodko (Ukraine) V Sachko	7	3	[7]
(Austria) N Oberleitner (Austria) J Schwärzler	5	6	[10]
