= 2022 NÖ Open – Singles =

Singles
- 2022 NÖ Open

Final
- Champion: (Slovakia) Jozef Kovalík
- Runner-up: (Netherlands) Jelle Sels
- Score: 7–6^{(8–6)}, 7–6^{(7–3)}

Events
Singles	Doubles
← 2021 ·	NÖ Open	· 2023 →

Mats Moraing was the defending champion but chose not to defend his title.

Jozef Kovalík won the title after defeating Jelle Sels 7–6^{(8–6)}, 7–6^{(7–3)} in the final.

== Seeds ==
1. (Argentina) Federico Coria (second round)
2. (Chinese Taipei) Tseng Chun-hsin (first round)
3. (Slovakia) Norbert Gombos (semifinals)
4. (Sweden) Elias Ymer (semifinals)
5. (Austria) Dennis Novak (first round)
6. (Austria) Jurij Rodionov (quarterfinals)
7. (Austria) Filip Misolic (first round)
8. (Italy) Marco Cecchinato (first round)

== Draw ==
Key

- Q = Qualifier
- WC = Wild card
- LL = Lucky loser
- Alt = Alternate
- ITF = ITF entry
- PR = Protected ranking
- SR = Special ranking
- SE = Special exempt
- JE = Junior exempt
- JR = Junior Accelerator Programme entrant
- CO = College Accelerator Programme entrant
- NG = Next Gen Accelerator Program entrant
- w/o = Walkover
- r = Retired
- d = Defaulted

=== Finals ===
Semifinals
Q	(Netherlands) Jelle Sels	6	7^{7}
3	(Slovakia) Norbert Gombos	4	6^{4}
4	(Sweden) Elias Ymer	5	6	4
(Slovakia) Jozef Kovalík	7	3	6

Final
Q	(Netherlands) Jelle Sels	6^{6}	6^{3}
(Slovakia) Jozef Kovalík	7^{8}	7^{7}

=== Top half ===
First round
1	(Argentina) F Coria	6	3	6
A Shevchenko	4	6	3
SE	(France) M Janvier	6	4	3
Q	(Netherlands) J Sels	4	6	6
WC	(Austria) J Schwärzler	1	2
(Italy) G Zeppieri	6	6
Q	(Germany) Elmar Ejupovic	6	7
8	(Italy) M Cecchinato	4	5
3	(Slovakia) N Gombos	7	6
(Argentina) TA Tirante	5	4
(Italy) F Cobolli	2	7^{7}	6^{7}
(Italy) G Mager	6	6^{3}	7^{9}
SE	(Germany) C-M Stebe	4	4
PR	(Austria) S Ofner	6	6
WC	(Austria) L Miedler	6	7^{8}
7	(Austria) F Misolic	4	6^{6}

Second round
1	(Argentina) F Coria	6	6^{5}	3
Q	(Netherlands) J Sels	4	7^{7}	6
(Italy) G Zeppieri	6	6
Q	(Germany) E Ejupovic	4	4
3	(Slovakia) N Gombos	6	7
(Italy) G Mager	4	5
PR	(Austria) S Ofner	7	6
WC	(Austria) L Miedler	5	2

Quarterfinals
Q	(Netherlands) J Sels	6	3
(Italy) G Zeppieri	3	1^{r}
3	(Slovakia) N Gombos	1	6	6
PR	(Austria) S Ofner	6	3	2

Semifinals
Q	(Netherlands) J Sels	6	7^{7}
3	(Slovakia) N Gombos	4	6^{4}

=== Bottom half ===
First round
5	(Austria) D Novak	6^{9}	4
Q	(Slovakia) L Klein	7^{11}	6
(Brazil) F Meligeni Alves	6	7^{7}
(Czech Republic) Z Kolář	3	6^{3}
PR	(Portugal) P Sousa	6	6
(Italy) F Passaro	4	4
WC	(Austria) L Neumayer	3	4
4	(Sweden) E Ymer	6	6
6	(Austria) J Rodionov	7^{7}	6
Q	(Lebanon) B Hassan	6^{5}	4
(Bulgaria) D Kuzmanov	7^{7}	2	1
Q	(Germany) J Lenz	6^{5}	6	6
Q	I Gakhov	6	7
Alt	(Austria) G Melzer	2	5
(Slovakia) J Kovalík	5	6	6
2	(Chinese Taipei) C-h Tseng	7	3	4

Second round
Q	(Slovakia) L Klein	4	7^{7}	6
(Brazil) F Meligeni Alves	6	6^{4}	4
PR	(Portugal) P Sousa	3	2
4	(Sweden) E Ymer	6	6
6	(Austria) J Rodionov	6	6
Q	(Germany) J Lenz	4	2
Q	I Gakhov	3	0^{r}
(Slovakia) J Kovalík	6	4

Quarterfinals
Q	(Slovakia) L Klein	5	3
4	(Sweden) E Ymer	7	6
6	(Austria) J Rodionov	1	3
(Slovakia) J Kovalík	6	6

Semifinals
4	(Sweden) E Ymer	5	6	4
(Slovakia) J Kovalík	7	3	6
