= 2022 NÖ Open =

- Date: 5–10 September
- Edition: 2nd
- Surface: Clay
- Location: Tulln an der Donau, Austria

Champions

Singles
- (Slovakia) Jozef Kovalík

Doubles
- (Austria) Alexander Erler / (Austria) Lucas Miedler
← 2021 ·	NÖ Open	· 2023 →

The 2022 NÖ Open was a professional tennis tournament played on clay courts. It was the second edition of the tournament which was part of the 2022 ATP Challenger Tour. It took place in Tulln an der Donau, Austria between 5 and 10 September 2022.

== Singles main-draw entrants ==
=== Seeds ===
Country	Player	Rank^{1}	Seed
ARG	Federico Coria	78	1
TPE	Tseng Chun-hsin	89	2
SVK	Norbert Gombos	114	3
SWE	Elias Ymer	133	4
AUT	Dennis Novak	136	5
AUT	Jurij Rodionov	139	6
AUT	Filip Misolic	141	7
ITA	Marco Cecchinato	142	8

- ^{1} Rankings are as of 29 August 2022.

=== Other entrants ===
The following players received wildcards into the singles main draw:

- (Austria) Lucas Miedler
- (Austria) Lukas Neumayer
- (Austria) Joel Schwärzler

The following players received entry into the singles main draw as special exempts:

- (France) Maxime Janvier
- (Germany) Cedrik-Marcel Stebe

The following players received entry into the singles main draw using protected rankings:

- (Austria) Sebastian Ofner
- (Portugal) Pedro Sousa

The following player received entry into the singles main draw as an alternate:

- (Austria) Gerald Melzer

The following players received entry from the qualifying draw:

- (Germany) Elmar Ejupovic
- Ivan Gakhov
- (Lebanon) Benjamin Hassan
- (Slovakia) Lukáš Klein
- (Germany) Julian Lenz
- (Netherlands) Jelle Sels

== Champions ==
=== Singles ===
- (Slovakia) Jozef Kovalík def. (Netherlands) Jelle Sels 7–6^{(8–6)}, 7–6^{(7–3)}.

=== Doubles ===
- (Austria) Alexander Erler / (Austria) Lucas Miedler def. (Czech Republic) Zdeněk Kolář / (Ukraine) Denys Molchanov 6–3, 6–4.
