= 2021 NÖ Open – Doubles =

Doubles
- 2021 NÖ Open

Final
- Champions: (Germany) Dustin Brown (Italy) Andrea Vavassori
- Runners-up: (Brazil) Rafael Matos (Brazil) Felipe Meligeni Alves
- Score: 7–6^{(7–5)}, 6–1

Events
| Singles | Doubles |
| NÖ Open | · 2022 → |

This was the first edition of the tournament.

Dustin Brown and Andrea Vavassori won the title after defeating Rafael Matos and Felipe Meligeni Alves 7–6^{(7–5)}, 6–1 in the final.

== Seeds ==
1. (Sweden) André Göransson / (United States) Nathaniel Lammons (semifinals)
2. (Brazil) Rafael Matos / (Brazil) Felipe Meligeni Alves (final)
3. (Czech Republic) Roman Jebavý / (Slovakia) Igor Zelenay (first round, retired)
4. (Germany) Dustin Brown / (Italy) Andrea Vavassori (champions)

== Draw ==
Key

- Q = Qualifier
- WC = Wild card
- LL = Lucky loser
- Alt = Alternate
- ITF = ITF entry
- PR = Protected ranking
- SR = Special ranking
- SE = Special exempt
- JE = Junior exempt
- JR = Junior Accelerator Programme entrant
- CO = College Accelerator Programme entrant
- NG = Next Gen Accelerator Program entrant
- w/o = Walkover
- r = Retired
- d = Defaulted

First round
1 | (Sweden) A Göransson (United States) N Lammons | 6 | 7^{7}
(Russia) B Bobrov (Slovakia) F Horanský | 4 | 6^{3}
WC | (Austria) Lenny Hampel (Austria) Lukas Krainer | 3 | 4
(Switzerland) M-A Hüsler (Poland) J Zieliński | 6 | 6
4 | (Germany) D Brown (Italy) A Vavassori | 7 | 6
(Austria) G Melzer (Austria) J Melzer | 5 | 2
(France) G Blancaneaux (France) M Janvier | 5 | 6 | [10]
(Austria) F Misolic (Austria) M Neuchrist | 7 | 3 | [4]
(Austria) A Erler (Austria) L Miedler | 3 | 6 | [9]
(Germany) J Härteis (Germany) B Hassan | 6 | 2 | [11]
(Czech Republic) M Gengel (Belarus) U Ignatik | 6 | 3
3 | (Czech Republic) R Jebavý (Slovakia) I Zelenay | 3 | 0^{r}
(France) M Martineau (Argentina) G Villanueva | 6 | 2 | [10]
WC | (Austria) L Neumayer (Austria) N Oberleitner | 3 | 6 | [6]
WC | (Austria) Benedikt Emesz (Austria) Hans Peter Kaufmann | 3 | 3
2 | (Brazil) R Matos (Brazil) F Meligeni Alves | 6 | 6

Quarterfinals
1 | (Sweden) A Göransson (United States) N Lammons | 6 | 6
(Switzerland) M-A Hüsler (Poland) J Zieliński | 4 | 4
4 | (Germany) D Brown (Italy) A Vavassori | 6 | 6
(France) G Blancaneaux (France) M Janvier | 4 | 2
(Germany) J Härteis (Germany) B Hassan | 6 | 6
(Czech Republic) M Gengel (Belarus) U Ignatik | 3 | 3
(France) M Martineau (Argentina) G Villanueva | 1 | 2
2 | (Brazil) R Matos (Brazil) F Meligeni Alves | 6 | 6

Semifinals
1 | (Sweden) A Göransson (United States) N Lammons | 3 | 2
4 | (Germany) D Brown (Italy) A Vavassori | 6 | 6
(Germany) J Härteis (Germany) B Hassan | 3 | 6^{3}
2 | (Brazil) R Matos (Brazil) F Meligeni Alves | 6 | 7^{7}

Final
4 | (Germany) D Brown (Italy) A Vavassori | 7^{7} | 6
2 | (Brazil) R Matos (Brazil) F Meligeni Alves | 6^{5} | 1
