= 2024 NÖ Open – Singles =

Singles
- 2024 NÖ Open

Final
- Champion: (United Kingdom) Jan Choinski
- Runner-up: (Austria) Lukas Neumayer
- Score: 6–4, 6–1

Events
Singles	Doubles
- NÖ Open

Vít Kopřiva was the defending champion but lost in the first round to Jan Choinski.

Choinski won the title after defeating Lukas Neumayer 6–4, 6–1 in the final.

== Seeds ==
1. (Czech Republic) Vít Kopřiva (first round)
2. (Switzerland) Jérôme Kym (quarterfinals)
3. (France) Valentin Royer (second round)
4. (Hungary) Zsombor Piros (first round)
5. (Austria) Filip Misolic (first round)
6. (United Kingdom) Oliver Crawford (second round)
7. (Romania) Filip Cristian Jianu (first round)
8. (Austria) Dennis Novak (first round)

== Draw ==
Key

- Q = Qualifier
- WC = Wild card
- LL = Lucky loser
- Alt = Alternate
- ITF = ITF entry
- PR = Protected ranking
- SR = Special ranking
- SE = Special exempt
- JE = Junior exempt
- JR = Junior Accelerator Programme entrant
- CO = College Accelerator Programme entrant
- NG = Next Gen Accelerator Program entrant
- w/o = Walkover
- r = Retired
- d = Defaulted

=== Finals ===
Semifinals
(United Kingdom) Jan Choinski	6	6
Alt	(Czech Republic) Jakub Nicod	4	4
(Germany) Rudolf Molleker	4	3
(Austria) Lukas Neumayer	6	6

Final
(United Kingdom) Jan Choinski	6	6
(Austria) Lukas Neumayer	4	1

=== Top half ===
First round
1	(Czech Republic) V Kopřiva	6	3	4
(United Kingdom) J Choinski	1	6	6
LL	(Egypt) M Safwat	4	4
(Germany) M Möller	6	6
Q	(Bulgaria) P Nesterov	3	6	3
Q	(Germany) MH Rehberg	6	4	6
(Croatia) L Mikrut	4	6	6
7	(Romania) FC Jianu	6	4	3
4	(Hungary) Z Piros	4	6^{5}
Q	(Germany) M Topo	6	7^{7}
Q	I Gakhov	6^{2}	6	6
WC	(Austria) J Schwärzler	7^{7}	4	3
Alt	(Czech Republic) Jakub Nicod	6	3	6
WC	(Austria) N Oberleitner	4	6	4
(Germany) D Masur	6	5	6
8	(Austria) D Novak	3	7	4

Second round
(United Kingdom) J Choinski	7^{7}	6^{6}	7
(Germany) M Möller	6^{2}	7^{8}	5
Q	(Germany) MH Rehberg	6	3	6
(Croatia) L Mikrut	0	6	1
Q	(Germany) M Topo	6^{7}	2
Q	I Gakhov	7^{9}	6
Alt	(Czech Republic) J Nicod	7^{10}	6
(Germany) D Masur	6^{8}	0

Quarterfinals
(United Kingdom) J Choinski	6	6
Q	(Germany) MH Rehberg	1	1
Q	I Gakhov	3	7	2
Alt	(Czech Republic) J Nicod	6	5	6

Semifinals
(United Kingdom) J Choinski	6	6
Alt	(Czech Republic) J Nicod	4	4

=== Bottom half ===
First round
5	(Austria) F Misolic	3	1
Q	(Ukraine) V Sachko	6	6
(Czech Republic) A Paulson	6	4	7
(Czech Republic) M Vrbenský	4	6	5
(Germany) R Molleker	4	7^{7}	6
(Brazil) M Pucinelli de Almeida	6	6^{4}	1
Q	(Slovenia) B Rola	4	2
3	(France) V Royer	6	6
6	(United Kingdom) O Crawford	7^{12}	2	6
(Italy) L Giustino	6^{10}	6	3
(Austria) L Neumayer	6	6
WC	(Austria) S Kopp	4	2
(Czech Republic) M Krumich	7^{7}	6
(Czech Republic) J Forejtek	6^{4}	2
(Netherlands) M Houkes	6	3	4
2	(Switzerland) J Kym	4	6	6

Second round
Q	(Ukraine) V Sachko	1	5
(Czech Republic) A Paulson	6	7
(Germany) R Molleker	7	6
3	(France) V Royer	5	4
6	(United Kingdom) O Crawford	4	0
(Austria) L Neumayer	6	6
(Czech Republic) M Krumich	4	6	1
2	(Switzerland) J Kym	6	4	6

Quarterfinals
(Czech Republic) A Paulson	4	7^{7}	3
(Germany) R Molleker	6	6^{5}	6
(Austria) L Neumayer	7	6^{3}	6
2	(Switzerland) J Kym	5	7^{7}	4

Semifinals
(Germany) R Molleker	4	3
(Austria) L Neumayer	6	6
