= 2026 NÖ Open – Doubles =

Doubles
- 2026 NÖ Open

Final
- Champions: (Slovakia) Miloš Karol (Czech Republic) Andrew Paulson
- Runners-up: (Romania) Victor Vlad Cornea (Austria) Maximilian Neuchrist
- Score: 6–3, 3–6, [10–7]

Events
Singles	Doubles
- NÖ Open

Neil Oberleitner and Joel Schwärzler were the defending champions but chose not to defend their title.

Miloš Karol and Andrew Paulson won the title after defeating Victor Vlad Cornea and Maximilian Neuchrist 6–3, 3–6, [10–7] in the final.

== Seeds ==
1. (Israel) Daniel Cukierman / (Czech Republic) David Poljak (semifinals)
2. (Slovakia) Miloš Karol / (Czech Republic) Andrew Paulson (champions)
3. (Netherlands) Jarno Jans / (Netherlands) Niels Visker (quarterfinals)
4. (Romania) Victor Vlad Cornea / (Austria) Maximilian Neuchrist (final)

== Draw ==
Key

- Q = Qualifier
- WC = Wild card
- LL = Lucky loser
- Alt = Alternate
- ITF = ITF entry
- PR = Protected ranking
- SR = Special ranking
- SE = Special exempt
- JE = Junior exempt
- JR = Junior Accelerator Programme entrant
- CO = College Accelerator Programme entrant
- NG = Next Gen Accelerator Program entrant
- w/o = Walkover
- r = Retired
- d = Defaulted

First round
1	(Israel) D Cukierman (Czech Republic) D Poljak	4	6	[13]
(Czech Republic) Z Kolář (Slovakia) L Pokorný	6	3	[11]
(Argentina) Valentín Basel (Argentina) F Ribero	2	3
(Bulgaria) A Genov (Germany) K Wehnelt	6	6
4	(Romania) V Cornea (Austria) M Neuchrist	6	6
(Germany) J Opitz (Latvia) R Strombachs	4	4
(Austria) N Hipfl (Austria) S Kopp
WC	(Austria) Timo Rosenkranz-König (Austria) Matthias Ujvary	w/o
(Argentina) JM La Serna (Argentina) Lucio Ratti
(Czech Republic) D Reček (Czech Republic) D Siniakov	w/o
(Austria) F Misolic (Austria) L Neumayer	2	1
3	(Netherlands) J Jans (Netherlands) N Visker	6	6
(Czech Republic) H Bartoň (Ukraine) V Sachko	3	6^{5}
WC	(Austria) Jonas Gundacker (Austria) Gregor Hausberger	6	7^{7}
(Peru) A Merino (United States) Michael Zhu	3	3
2	(Slovakia) M Karol (Czech Republic) A Paulson	6	6

Quarterfinals
1	(Israel) D Cukierman (Czech Republic) D Poljak	7^{8}	6
(Bulgaria) A Genov (Germany) K Wehnelt	6^{6}	4
4	(Romania) V Cornea (Austria) M Neuchrist	6	6
WC	(Austria) T Rosenkranz-König (Austria) M Ujvary	1	3
(Czech Republic) D Reček (Czech Republic) D Siniakov	7^{7}	3	[10]
3	(Netherlands) J Jans (Netherlands) N Visker	6^{3}	6	[4]
WC	(Austria) J Gundacker (Austria) G Hausberger	2	4
2	(Slovakia) M Karol (Czech Republic) A Paulson	6	6

Semifinals
1	(Israel) D Cukierman (Czech Republic) D Poljak	6	6^{5}	[7]
4	(Romania) V Cornea (Austria) M Neuchrist	3	7^{7}	[10]
(Czech Republic) D Reček (Czech Republic) D Siniakov	6	6^{6}	[8]
2	(Slovakia) M Karol (Czech Republic) A Paulson	2	7^{8}	[10]

Final
4	(Romania) V Cornea (Austria) M Neuchrist	3	6	[7]
2	(Slovakia) M Karol (Czech Republic) A Paulson	6	3	[10]
