= 2025 NÖ Open – Singles =

Singles
- 2025 NÖ Open

Final
- Champion: (Argentina) Marco Trungelliti
- Runner-up: (Czech Republic) Andrew Paulson
- Score: 7–5, 6–1

Events
Singles	Doubles
- NÖ Open

Jan Choinski was the defending champion but lost in the second round to Joel Schwärzler.

Marco Trungelliti won the title after defeating Andrew Paulson 7–5, 6–1 in the final.

== Seeds ==
1. (United Kingdom) Jan Choinski (second round)
2. (Italy) Francesco Maestrelli (quarterfinals)
3. (Austria) Lukas Neumayer (first round)
4. (Argentina) Marco Trungelliti (champion)
5. (Argentina) Santiago Rodríguez Taverna (semifinals)
6. (Ukraine) Vitaliy Sachko (second round)
7. (Switzerland) Dominic Stricker (first round)
8. (Argentina) Alex Barrena (first round)

== Draw ==
Key

- Q = Qualifier
- WC = Wild card
- LL = Lucky loser
- Alt = Alternate
- ITF = ITF entry
- PR = Protected ranking
- SR = Special ranking
- SE = Special exempt
- JE = Junior exempt
- JR = Junior Accelerator Programme entrant
- CO = College Accelerator Programme entrant
- NG = Next Gen Accelerator Program entrant
- w/o = Walkover
- r = Retired
- d = Defaulted

=== Finals ===
Semifinals
WC	(Austria) Joel Schwärzler	4	3
4	(Argentina) Marco Trungelliti	6	6
5	(Argentina) Santiago Rodríguez Taverna	7	3	3
PR	(Czech Republic) Andrew Paulson	5	6	6

Final
4	(Argentina) Marco Trungelliti	7	6
PR	(Czech Republic) Andrew Paulson	5	1

=== Top half ===
First round
1	(United Kingdom) J Choinski	6	6
Q	(Slovakia) J Kovalík	0	2
WC	(Austria) J Schwärzler	6	3	6
(Portugal) T Pereira	4	6	3
(India) S Nagal	6	6
(Croatia) M Poljičak	4	2
(Romania) FC Jianu	6	6
8	(Argentina) A Barrena	4	2
4	(Argentina) M Trungelliti	6	6
I Gakhov	4	2
Q	(Czech Republic) Z Kolář	7	2	3
(Croatia) L Mikrut	5	6	6
(France) C Denolly	6	5	2
WC	(Austria) S Kopp	2	7	6
Q	(Czech Republic) M Mrva	2	6^{5}
6	(Ukraine) V Sachko	6	7^{7}

Second round
1	(United Kingdom) J Choinski	6^{3}	2
WC	(Austria) J Schwärzler	7^{7}	6
(India) S Nagal	6	6
(Romania) FC Jianu	3	4
4	(Argentina) M Trungelliti	7^{7}	6
(Croatia) L Mikrut	6^{4}	0
WC	(Austria) S Kopp	1	7^{7}	6
6	(Ukraine) V Sachko	6	6^{2}	4

Quarterfinals
WC	(Austria) J Schwärzler	6^{4}	6	6
(India) S Nagal	7^{7}	4	1
4	(Argentina) M Trungelliti	7^{7}	6
WC	(Austria) S Kopp	6^{2}	1

Semifinals
WC	(Austria) J Schwärzler	4	3
4	(Argentina) M Trungelliti	6	6

=== Bottom half ===
First round
5	(Argentina) S Rodríguez Taverna	6	6
(France) Mathys Erhard	3	4
(Netherlands) J Sels	6	3	2
NG	(Germany) D Dedura	4	6	6
Q	(Germany) R Molleker	7^{8}	4	6
Q	(Czech Republic) D Poljak	6^{6}	6	3
(Ukraine) O Prihodko	1	6	6
3	(Austria) L Neumayer	6	3	4
7	(Switzerland) D Stricker	4	4
(Germany) M Topo	6	6
PR	(Czech Republic) A Paulson	6	6
(Italy) J Berrettini	3	4
Q	(Germany) K Wehnelt	6	7^{7}
WC	(Austria) N Oberleitner	3	6^{3}
(Bulgaria) D Kuzmanov	6^{3}	1
2	(Italy) F Maestrelli	7^{7}	6

Second round
5	(Argentina) S Rodríguez Taverna	6	6
NG	(Germany) D Dedura	4	4
Q	(Germany) R Molleker	2	5
(Ukraine) O Prihodko	6	7
(Germany) M Topo	5	6	6^{5}
PR	(Czech Republic) A Paulson	7	3	7^{7}
Q	(Germany) K Wehnelt	2	6	5
2	(Italy) F Maestrelli	6	3	7

Quarterfinals
5	(Argentina) S Rodríguez Taverna	6	6
(Ukraine) O Prihodko	3	4
PR	(Czech Republic) A Paulson	6	6
2	(Italy) F Maestrelli	2	3

Semifinals
5	(Argentina) S Rodríguez Taverna	7	3	3
PR	(Czech Republic) A Paulson	5	6	6
