= 2024 NÖ Open =

- Date: 2–8 September
- Edition: 4th
- Surface: Clay
- Location: Tulln an der Donau, Austria

Champions

Singles
- (United Kingdom) Jan Choinski

Doubles
- (Slovakia) Miloš Karol / (Ukraine) Vitaliy Sachko
- NÖ Open

The 2024 NÖ Open powered by EVN was a professional tennis tournament played on clay courts. It was the fourth edition of the tournament which was part of the 2024 ATP Challenger Tour. It took place in Tulln an der Donau, Austria between 2 and 8 September 2024.

== Singles main-draw entrants ==
=== Seeds ===
Country	Player	Rank^{1}	Seed
CZE	Vít Kopřiva	118	1
SUI	Jérôme Kym	180	2
FRA	Valentin Royer	200	3
HUN	Zsombor Piros	212	4
AUT	Filip Misolic	224	5
GBR	Oliver Crawford	225	6
ROU	Filip Cristian Jianu	233	7
AUT	Dennis Novak	238	8

- ^{1} Rankings are as of 26 August 2024.

=== Other entrants ===
The following players received wildcards into the singles main draw:

- (Austria) Sandro Kopp
- (Austria) Neil Oberleitner
- (Austria) Joel Schwärzler

The following player received entry into the singles main draw as an alternate:

- (Czech Republic) Jakub Nicod

The following players received entry from the qualifying draw:

- Ivan Gakhov
- (Bulgaria) Petr Nesterov
- (Germany) Max Hans Rehberg
- (Slovenia) Blaž Rola
- (Ukraine) Vitaliy Sachko
- (Germany) Marko Topo

The following player received entry as a lucky loser:

- (Egypt) Mohamed Safwat

== Champions ==
=== Singles ===
- (United Kingdom) Jan Choinski def. (Austria) Lukas Neumayer 6–4, 6–1.

=== Doubles ===
- (Slovakia) Miloš Karol / (Ukraine) Vitaliy Sachko def. (Poland) Karol Drzewiecki / (Poland) Piotr Matuszewski 6–4, 2–6, [11–9].
