= 2021 NÖ Open – Singles =

Singles
- 2021 NÖ Open

Final
- Champion: (Germany) Mats Moraing
- Runner-up: (France) Hugo Gaston
- Score: 6–2, 6–1

Events
Singles	Doubles
NÖ Open	· 2022 →

This was the first edition of the tournament.

Mats Moraing won the title after defeating Hugo Gaston 6–2, 6–1 in the final.

== Seeds ==
1. (Italy) Marco Cecchinato (first round)
2. (Czech Republic) Jiří Veselý (semifinals)
3. (Brazil) Thiago Monteiro (quarterfinals)
4. (Poland) Kamil Majchrzak (semifinals)
5. (Slovakia) Jozef Kovalík (second round)
6. (Bosnia and Herzegovina) Damir Džumhur (first round)
7. (Austria) Dennis Novak (quarterfinals)
8. (France) Hugo Gaston (final)

== Draw ==
Key

- Q = Qualifier
- WC = Wild card
- LL = Lucky loser
- Alt = Alternate
- ITF = ITF entry
- PR = Protected ranking
- SR = Special ranking
- SE = Special exempt
- JE = Junior exempt
- JR = Junior Accelerator Programme entrant
- CO = College Accelerator Programme entrant
- NG = Next Gen Accelerator Program entrant
- w/o = Walkover
- r = Retired
- d = Defaulted

=== Finals ===
Semifinals
8	(France) Hugo Gaston	6	3	6
4	(Poland) Kamil Majchrzak	3	6	4
(Germany) Mats Moraing	3	7	6
2	(Czech Republic) Jiří Veselý	6	5	3

Final
8	(France) Hugo Gaston	2	1
(Germany) Mats Moraing	6	6

=== Top half ===
First round
1	(Italy) M Cecchinato	6^{1}	6	2
WC	(Austria) F Misolic	7^{7}	2	6
Q	(France) M Martineau	2	6^{4}
(Czech Republic) J Forejtek	6	7^{7}
(Austria) S Ofner	6	5	7^{7}
Q	(Germany) B Hassan	3	7	6^{5}
Q	(Austria) N Oberleitner	6^{5}	2
8	(France) H Gaston	7^{7}	6
4	(Poland) K Majchrzak	3	6	6
(Denmark) H Rune	6	4	2
(Czech Republic) J Lehečka	6	6
(France) M Janvier	4	3
Alt	(Germany) J Härteis	6	4	3
(Slovakia) F Horanský	4	6	6
(Switzerland) M-A Hüsler	6^{5}	6	6
6	(Bosnia and Herzegovina) D Džumhur	7^{7}	2	3

Second round
WC	(Austria) F Misolic	6^{2}	6	6
(Czech Republic) J Forejtek	7^{7}	3	2
(Austria) S Ofner	1	4
8	(France) H Gaston	6	6
4	(Poland) K Majchrzak	6	6
(Czech Republic) J Lehečka	1	0
(Slovakia) F Horanský	6	1	4
(Switzerland) M-A Hüsler	2	6	6

Quarterfinals
WC	(Austria) F Misolic	0	6	3
8	(France) H Gaston	6	2	6
4	(Poland) K Majchrzak	7^{7}	7
(Switzerland) M-A Hüsler	6^{5}	5

Semifinals
8	(France) H Gaston	6	3	6
4	(Poland) K Majchrzak	3	6	4

=== Bottom half ===
First round
5	(Slovakia) J Kovalík	6	3	7
(Germany) Y Hanfmann	3	6	5
(Germany) M Moraing	6	6
Alt	(Austria) L Miedler	2	1
(Austria) A Erler	4	7	1
(Czech Republic) L Rosol	6	5	6
(Germany) M Bachinger	6	1	1
3	(Brazil) T Monteiro	3	6	6
7	(Austria) D Novak	1	6	6
Q	(Belarus) U Ignatik	6	4	2
WC	(Austria) G Melzer	2	6	5
(Brazil) F Meligeni Alves	6	3	7
(Germany) C-M Stebe	3	0
(France) G Blancaneaux	6	6
WC	(Austria) L Neumayer	5	6^{8}
2	(Czech Republic) J Veselý	7	7^{10}

Second round
5	(Slovakia) J Kovalík	6	3	4
(Germany) M Moraing	2	6	6
(Czech Republic) L Rosol	6^{6}	1
3	(Brazil) T Monteiro	7^{8}	6
7	(Austria) D Novak	7	6
(Brazil) F Meligeni Alves	5	4
(France) G Blancaneaux	1	1
2	(Czech Republic) J Veselý	6	6

Quarterfinals
(Germany) M Moraing	6	0	7^{7}
3	(Brazil) T Monteiro	1	6	6^{5}
7	(Austria) D Novak	3	3
2	(Czech Republic) J Veselý	6	6

Semifinals
(Germany) M Moraing	3	7	6
2	(Czech Republic) J Veselý	6	5	3
