= 2022 NÖ Open – Doubles =

Doubles
- 2022 NÖ Open

Final
- Champions: (Austria) Alexander Erler (Austria) Lucas Miedler
- Runners-up: (Czech Republic) Zdeněk Kolář (Ukraine) Denys Molchanov
- Score: 6–3, 6–4

Events
Singles	Doubles
- NÖ Open

Dustin Brown and Andrea Vavassori were the defending champions but only Brown chose to defend his title, partnering Evan King. Brown lost in the first round to Lukáš Klein and Igor Zelenay.

Alexander Erler and Lucas Miedler won the title after defeating Zdeněk Kolář and Denys Molchanov 6–3, 6–4 in the final.

== Seeds ==
1. (Austria) Alexander Erler / (Austria) Lucas Miedler (champions)
2. (Serbia) Ivan Sabanov / (Serbia) Matej Sabanov (first round)
3. (Czech Republic) Roman Jebavý / (Czech Republic) Adam Pavlásek (first round)
4. (Czech Republic) Zdeněk Kolář / (Ukraine) Denys Molchanov (final)

== Draw ==
Key

- Q = Qualifier
- WC = Wild card
- LL = Lucky loser
- Alt = Alternate
- ITF = ITF entry
- PR = Protected ranking
- SR = Special ranking
- SE = Special exempt
- JE = Junior exempt
- JR = Junior Accelerator Programme entrant
- CO = College Accelerator Programme entrant
- NG = Next Gen Accelerator Program entrant
- w/o = Walkover
- r = Retired
- d = Defaulted

First round
1	(Austria) A Erler (Austria) L Miedler	6	6
(Lebanon) B Hassan (Ukraine) O Krutykh	4	1
WC	(Austria) S Kopp (Austria) Lukas Krainer	6	6^{5}	[10]
(Brazil) F Meligeni Alves (Argentina) TA Tirante	4	7^{7}	[4]
3	(Czech Republic) R Jebavý (Czech Republic) A Pavlásek	7^{7}	3	[8]
(Austria) M Neuchrist (Austria) T-S Weissborn	6^{1}	6	[10]
(Italy) M Cecchinato (Italy) G Zeppieri	3	0
(Uzbekistan) S Fayziev (Ukraine) V Manafov	6	6
(Italy) G Mager (Switzerland) L Margaroli	6	7^{7}
(Turkey) E Kırkın; A Shevchenko	3	6^{4}
WC	(Austria) N Oberleitner (Austria) J Schwärzler	2	4
4	(Czech Republic) Z Kolář (Ukraine) D Molchanov	6	6
(Jamaica) D Brown (United States) E King	3	3
(Slovakia) L Klein (Slovakia) I Zelenay	6	6
Alt	(Germany) J Lenz (Netherlands) J Sels	7^{7}	2	[10]
2	(Serbia) I Sabanov (Serbia) M Sabanov	6^{3}	6	[7]

Quarterfinals
1	(Austria) A Erler (Austria) L Miedler	6	7
WC	(Austria) S Kopp (Austria) L Krainer	3	5
(Austria) M Neuchrist (Austria) T-S Weissborn	7^{8}	6
(Uzbekistan) S Fayziev (Ukraine) V Manafov	6^{6}	1
(Italy) G Mager (Switzerland) L Margaroli	3	3
4	(Czech Republic) Z Kolář (Ukraine) D Molchanov	6	6
(Slovakia) L Klein (Slovakia) I Zelenay	7^{7}	6
Alt	(Germany) J Lenz (Netherlands) J Sels	6^{1}	3

Semifinals
1	(Austria) A Erler (Austria) L Miedler	6	6
(Austria) M Neuchrist (Austria) T-S Weissborn	3	4
4	(Czech Republic) Z Kolář (Ukraine) D Molchanov	w/o
(Slovakia) L Klein (Slovakia) I Zelenay

Final
1	(Austria) A Erler (Austria) L Miedler	6	6
4	(Czech Republic) Z Kolář (Ukraine) D Molchanov	3	4
