= 2023 NÖ Open – Singles =

Singles
- 2023 NÖ Open

Final
- Champion: (Czech Republic) Vít Kopřiva
- Runner-up: (India) Sumit Nagal
- Score: 6–2, 6–4

Events
Singles	Doubles
- NÖ Open

Jozef Kovalík was the defending champion but lost in the first round to Henri Squire.

Vít Kopřiva won the title after defeating Sumit Nagal 6–2, 6–4 in the final.

== Seeds ==
1. (Spain) Albert Ramos Viñolas (quarterfinals)
2. (Austria) Jurij Rodionov (second round)
3. (Germany) Maximilian Marterer (semifinals)
4. (Italy) Flavio Cobolli (semifinals)
5. (Slovakia) Jozef Kovalík (first round)
6. Ivan Gakhov (second round)
7. (Czech Republic) Dalibor Svrčina (second round)
8. (Ukraine) Vitaliy Sachko (second round)

== Draw ==
Key

- Q = Qualifier
- WC = Wild card
- LL = Lucky loser
- Alt = Alternate
- ITF = ITF entry
- PR = Protected ranking
- SR = Special ranking
- SE = Special exempt
- JE = Junior exempt
- JR = Junior Accelerator Programme entrant
- CO = College Accelerator Programme entrant
- NG = Next Gen Accelerator Program entrant
- w/o = Walkover
- r = Retired
- d = Defaulted

=== Finals ===
Semifinals
(India) Sumit Nagal	6	6
4	(Italy) Flavio Cobolli	3	4
3	(Germany) Maximilian Marterer	3	3
(Czech Republic) Vít Kopřiva	6	6

Final
(India) Sumit Nagal	2	4
(Czech Republic) Vít Kopřiva	6	6

=== Top half ===
First round
1	(Spain) A Ramos Viñolas	6	7^{7}
(Austria) F Misolic	4	6^{2}
WC	(Austria) S Kopp	3	4
Q	(Austria) G Melzer	6	6
(India) S Nagal	6	6
Q	(Germany) D Masur	1	2
(Austria) L Neumayer	6^{2}	6^{1}
8	(Ukraine) V Sachko	7^{7}	7^{7}
4	(Italy) F Cobolli	6	7
(Netherlands) J Sels	3	5
Q	(Germany) Jeremy Jahn	7^{7}	4	6^{4}
(Switzerland) H Laaksonen	6^{5}	6	7^{7}
WC	(Austria) N Oberleitner	6^{4}	6	3
WC	(Austria) L Miedler	7^{7}	2	6
(Germany) H Squire	6^{3}	6	6
5	(Slovakia) J Kovalík	7^{7}	2	4

Second round
1	(Spain) A Ramos Viñolas	6	6
Q	(Austria) G Melzer	3	2
(India) S Nagal	7^{7}	3	6
8	(Ukraine) V Sachko	6^{2}	6	3
4	(Italy) F Cobolli	5
(Switzerland) H Laaksonen	0^{r}
WC	(Austria) L Miedler	6	3	4
(Germany) H Squire	4	6	6

Quarterfinals
1	(Spain) A Ramos Viñolas	6^{6}	3
(India) S Nagal	7^{8}	6
4	(Italy) F Cobolli	6	6
(Germany) H Squire	1	2

Semifinals
(India) S Nagal	6	6
4	(Italy) F Cobolli	3	4

=== Bottom half ===
First round
6	I Gakhov	7	6
Q	(Lebanon) B Hassan	5	4
(Germany) R Molleker	5	4
(Argentina) S Rodríguez Taverna	7	6
(Germany) Timo Stodder	1	6	6
(Canada) S Diez	6	2	1
Q	(Czech Republic) L Rosol	4	6	3
3	(Germany) M Marterer	6	3	6
7	(Czech Republic) D Svrčina	1	6	6
Q	(Germany) M Möller	6	4	1
(Bulgaria) D Kuzmanov	6^{3}	6	7
(Austria) D Novak	7^{7}	2	5
(Czech Republic) V Kopřiva	6	7^{7}
(Czech Republic) Z Kolář	2	6^{4}
(Germany) Elmar Ejupovic	6^{4}	6	4
2	(Austria) J Rodionov	7^{7}	2	6

Second round
6	I Gakhov	7^{7}	4	6^{4}
(Argentina) S Rodríguez Taverna	6^{4}	6	7^{7}
(Germany) T Stodder	6^{9}	1
3	(Germany) M Marterer	7^{11}	6
7	(Czech Republic) D Svrčina	6	4	2
(Bulgaria) D Kuzmanov	2	6	6
(Czech Republic) V Kopřiva	7	2	6
2	(Austria) J Rodionov	5	6	4

Quarterfinals
(Argentina) S Rodríguez Taverna	6	4	6^{1}
3	(Germany) M Marterer	4	6	7^{7}
(Bulgaria) D Kuzmanov	1	1
(Czech Republic) V Kopřiva	6	6

Semifinals
3	(Germany) M Marterer	3	3
(Czech Republic) V Kopřiva	6	6
