= 2025 NÖ Open =

- Date: 1–7 September
- Edition: 5th
- Surface: Clay
- Location: Tulln an der Donau, Austria

Champions

Singles
- (Argentina) Marco Trungelliti

Doubles
- (Austria) Neil Oberleitner / (Austria) Joel Schwärzler
- NÖ Open

The 2025 NÖ Open was a professional tennis tournament played on clay courts. It was the fifth edition of the tournament which was part of the 2025 ATP Challenger Tour. It took place in Tulln an der Donau, Austria between 1 and 7 September 2025.

== Singles main-draw entrants ==
=== Seeds ===
Country	Player	Rank^{1}	Seed
GBR	Jan Choinski	150	1
ITA	Francesco Maestrelli	155	2
AUT	Lukas Neumayer	157	3
ARG	Marco Trungelliti	183	4
ARG	Santiago Rodríguez Taverna	207	5
UKR	Vitaliy Sachko	217	6
SUI	Dominic Stricker	226	7
ARG	Alex Barrena	228	8

- ^{1} Rankings are as of 25 August 2025.

=== Other entrants ===
The following players received wildcards into the singles main draw:

- (Austria) Sandro Kopp
- (Austria) Neil Oberleitner
- (Austria) Joel Schwärzler

The following player received entry into the singles main draw using a protected ranking:

- (Czech Republic) Andrew Paulson

The following player received entry into the singles main draw through the Next Gen Accelerator programme:

- (Germany) Diego Dedura

The following players received entry from the qualifying draw:

- (Czech Republic) Zdeněk Kolář
- (Slovakia) Jozef Kovalík
- (Germany) Rudolf Molleker
- (Czech Republic) Maxim Mrva
- (Czech Republic) David Poljak
- (Germany) Kai Wehnelt

== Champions ==
=== Singles ===
- (Argentina) Marco Trungelliti def. (Czech Republic) Andrew Paulson 7–5, 6–1.

=== Doubles ===
- (Austria) Neil Oberleitner / (Austria) Joel Schwärzler def. (Ukraine) Oleg Prihodko / (Ukraine) Vitaliy Sachko 5–7, 6–3, [10–7].
