= 2023 NÖ Open – Doubles =

Doubles
- 2023 NÖ Open

Final
- Champions: (Czech Republic) Zdeněk Kolář (Slovenia) Blaž Rola
- Runners-up: (Poland) Piotr Matuszewski (Germany) Kai Wehnelt
- Score: 6–4, 4–6, [10–6]

Events
Singles	Doubles
- NÖ Open

Alexander Erler and Lucas Miedler were the defending champions but chose not to defend their title.

Zdeněk Kolář and Blaž Rola won the title after defeating Piotr Matuszewski and Kai Wehnelt 6–4, 4–6, [10–6] in the final.

== Seeds ==
1. (France) Théo Arribagé / (France) Luca Sanchez (semifinals)
2. (India) Anirudh Chandrasekar / (India) Vijay Sundar Prashanth (first round)
3. (Czech Republic) Roman Jebavý / (Czech Republic) Petr Nouza (first round)
4. (Austria) Neil Oberleitner / (Ukraine) Oleg Prihodko (first round)

== Draw ==
Key

- Q = Qualifier
- WC = Wild card
- LL = Lucky loser
- Alt = Alternate
- ITF = ITF entry
- PR = Protected ranking
- SR = Special ranking
- SE = Special exempt
- JE = Junior exempt
- JR = Junior Accelerator Programme entrant
- CO = College Accelerator Programme entrant
- NG = Next Gen Accelerator Program entrant
- w/o = Walkover
- r = Retired
- d = Defaulted

First round
1	(France) T Arribagé (France) L Sanchez	6	6
Andrey Chepelev; Denis Klok	3	3
(United States) Jamie Vance (United States) Leonardo Vega	4	6	[2]
WC	(Austria) S Kopp (Austria) Matthias Ujvary	6	3	[10]
4	(Austria) N Oberleitner (Ukraine) O Prihodko	6^{5}	5
(Poland) P Matuszewski (Germany) K Wehnelt	7^{7}	7
(Poland) M Kaśnikowski (Bulgaria) Y Milev	6	3	[8]
(Switzerland) L Margaroli (Argentina) S Rodríguez Taverna	4	6	[10]
(Austria) D Pichler (Ukraine) V Sachko	6	3	[4]
WC	(Austria) G Melzer (Germany) M Moraing	2	6	[10]
(Czech Republic) Z Kolář (Slovenia) B Rola	4	7^{8}	[10]
3	(Czech Republic) R Jebavý (Czech Republic) P Nouza	6	6^{6}	[8]
(Czech Republic) V Kopřiva (Czech Republic) D Svrčina	4	6	[10]
(Canada) S Diez (Netherlands) J Sels	6	2	[7]
(Germany) M Marterer (Germany) D Masur	6	6
2	(India) A Chandrasekar (India) VS Prashanth	4	3

Quarterfinals
1	(France) T Arribagé (France) L Sanchez	7^{7}	6
WC	(Austria) S Kopp (Austria) M Ujvary	6^{5}	3
(Poland) P Matuszewski (Germany) K Wehnelt	6	6
(Switzerland) L Margaroli (Argentina) S Rodríguez Taverna	0	4
WC	(Austria) G Melzer (Germany) M Moraing	2	2
(Czech Republic) Z Kolář (Slovenia) B Rola	6	6
(Czech Republic) V Kopřiva (Czech Republic) D Svrčina
(Germany) M Marterer (Germany) D Masur	w/o

Semifinals
1	(France) T Arribagé (France) L Sanchez	6^{9}	7^{7}	[8]
(Poland) P Matuszewski (Germany) K Wehnelt	7^{11}	6^{5}	[10]
(Czech Republic) Z Kolář (Slovenia) B Rola	6	6
(Germany) M Marterer (Germany) D Masur	3	4

Final
(Poland) P Matuszewski (Germany) K Wehnelt	4	6	[6]
(Czech Republic) Z Kolář (Slovenia) B Rola	6	4	[10]
