= 2021 NÖ Open =

- Date: 6–12 September
- Edition: 1st
- Surface: Clay
- Location: Tulln an der Donau, Austria

Champions

Singles
- (Germany) Mats Moraing

Doubles
- (Germany) Dustin Brown / (Italy) Andrea Vavassori
- NÖ Open

The 2021 NÖ Open was a professional tennis tournament played on clay courts. It was the first edition of the tournament which was part of the 2021 ATP Challenger Tour. It took place in Tulln an der Donau, Austria between 6 and 12 September 2021.

== Singles main-draw entrants ==
=== Seeds ===
Country	Player	Rank^{1}	Seed
ITA	Marco Cecchinato	81	1
CZE	Jiří Veselý	90	2
BRA	Thiago Monteiro	93	3
POL	Kamil Majchrzak	114	4
SVK	Jozef Kovalík	118	5
BIH	Damir Džumhur	120	6
AUT	Dennis Novak	125	7
FRA	Hugo Gaston	127	8

- ^{1} Rankings are as of 30 August 2021.

=== Other entrants ===
The following players received wildcards into the singles main draw:

- (Austria) Gerald Melzer
- (Austria) Filip Misolic
- (Austria) Lukas Neumayer

The following players received entry into the singles main draw as alternates:

- (Germany) Johannes Härteis
- (Austria) Lucas Miedler

The following players received entry from the qualifying draw:

- (Germany) Benjamin Hassan
- (Belarus) Uladzimir Ignatik
- (France) Matteo Martineau
- (Austria) Neil Oberleitner

== Champions ==
=== Singles ===
- (Germany) Mats Moraing def. (France) Hugo Gaston 6–2, 6–1.

=== Doubles ===
- (Germany) Dustin Brown / (Italy) Andrea Vavassori def. (Brazil) Rafael Matos / (Brazil) Felipe Meligeni Alves 7–6^{(7–5)}, 6–1.
