= 2026 NÖ Open =

- Date: 7–13 September
- Edition: 6th
- Surface: Clay
- Location: Tulln an der Donau, Austria

Champions

Singles
- (Switzerland) Mika Brunold

Doubles
- (Slovakia) Miloš Karol / (Czech Republic) Andrew Paulson
- NÖ Open

The 2026 NÖ Open was a professional tennis tournament played on clay courts. It was the sixth edition of the tournament which was part of the 2026 ATP Challenger Tour. It took place in Tulln an der Donau, Austria between 7 and 13 September 2026.

== Singles main-draw entrants ==
=== Seeds ===
Country	Player	Rank^{1}	Seed
SVK	Alex Molčan	86	1
BRA	Gustavo Heide	128	2
CZE	Zdeněk Kolář	175	3
UKR	Vitaliy Sachko	188	4
AUT	Lukas Neumayer	191	5
CZE	Maxim Mrva	212	6
GER	Henri Squire	215	7
ARG	Alex Barrena	235	8

- ^{1} Rankings are as of 31 August 2026.

=== Other entrants ===
The following players received wildcards into the singles main draw:

- (Austria) Nico Hipfl
- (Austria) Filip Misolic
- (Austria) Sebastian Sorger

The following players received entry into the singles main draw as alternates:

- (Serbia) Ognjen Milić
- (Germany) Marvin Möller
- (Germany) Max Hans Rehberg
- (Germany) Marko Topo

The following players received entry from the qualifying draw:

- (Switzerland) Mika Brunold
- (Germany) Diego Dedura
- Svyatoslav Gulin
- (Slovakia) Lukáš Pokorný
- (Czech Republic) Daniel Siniakov
- (Sweden) Olle Wallin

== Champions ==
=== Singles ===
- (Switzerland) Mika Brunold def. (Brazil) João Lucas Reis da Silva 6–4, 6–3.

=== Doubles ===
- (Slovakia) Miloš Karol / (Czech Republic) Andrew Paulson def. (Romania) Victor Vlad Cornea / (Austria) Maximilian Neuchrist 6–3, 3–6, [10–7].
