= 2023 NÖ Open =

- Date: 4–10 September
- Edition: 3rd
- Surface: Clay
- Location: Tulln an der Donau, Austria

Champions

Singles
- (Czech Republic) Vít Kopřiva

Doubles
- (Czech Republic) Zdeněk Kolář / (Slovenia) Blaž Rola
- NÖ Open

The 2023 NÖ Open was a professional tennis tournament played on clay courts. It was the third edition of the tournament which was part of the 2023 ATP Challenger Tour. It took place in Tulln an der Donau, Austria between 4 and 10 September 2023.

== Singles main-draw entrants ==
=== Seeds ===
Country	Player	Rank^{1}	Seed
ESP	Albert Ramos Viñolas	88	1
AUT	Jurij Rodionov	100	2
GER	Maximilian Marterer	130	3
ITA	Flavio Cobolli	137	4
SVK	Jozef Kovalík	151	5
	Ivan Gakhov	161	6
CZE	Dalibor Svrčina	164	7
UKR	Vitaliy Sachko	165	8

- ^{1} Rankings are as of 28 August 2023.

=== Other entrants ===
The following players received wildcards into the singles main draw:

- (Austria) Sandro Kopp
- (Austria) Lucas Miedler
- (Austria) Neil Oberleitner

The following players received entry from the qualifying draw:

- (Lebanon) Benjamin Hassan
- (Germany) Jeremy Jahn
- (Germany) Daniel Masur
- (Austria) Gerald Melzer
- (Germany) Marvin Möller
- (Czech Republic) Lukáš Rosol

== Champions ==
=== Singles ===
- (Czech Republic) Vít Kopřiva def. (India) Sumit Nagal 6–2, 6–4.

=== Doubles ===
- (Czech Republic) Zdeněk Kolář / (Slovenia) Blaž Rola def. (Poland) Piotr Matuszewski / (Germany) Kai Wehnelt 6–4, 4–6, [10–6].
