= Victor Vlad Cornea =

Romanian tennis player

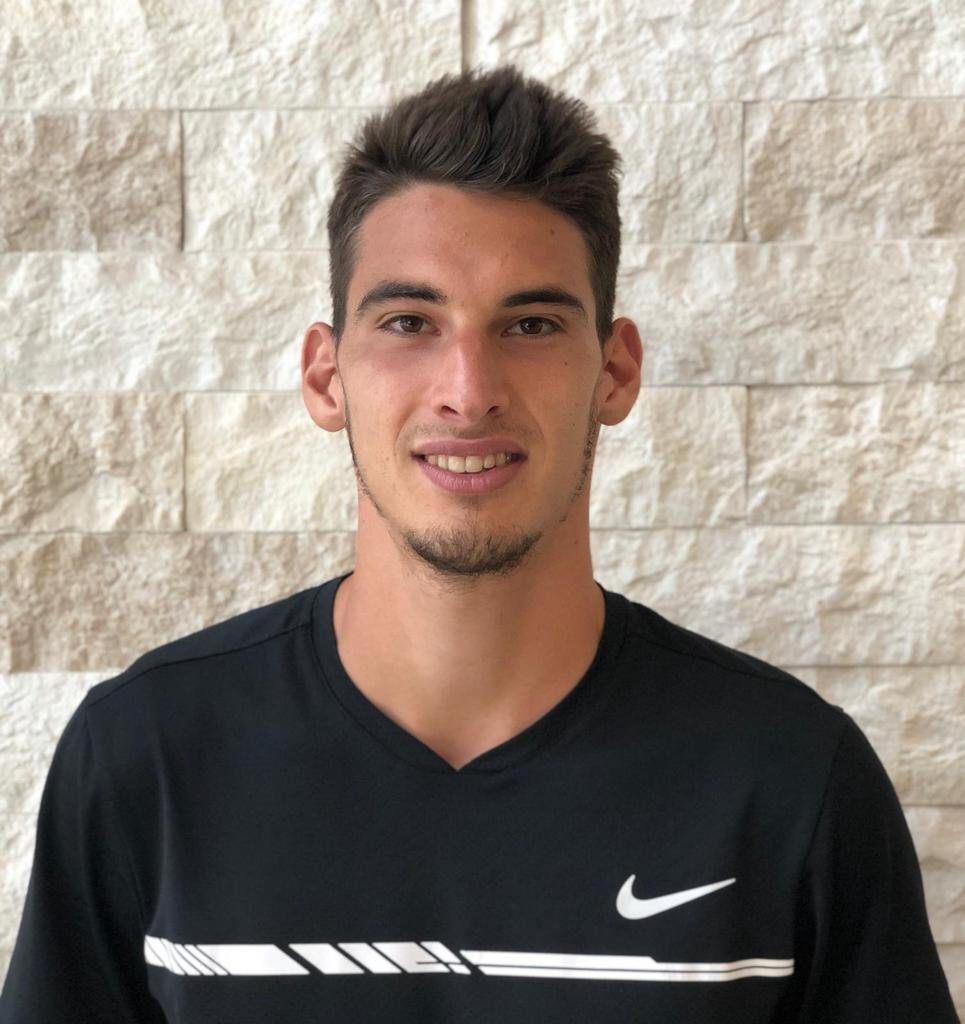
- Full name: Victor Vlad Cornea
- Country (sports): Romania
- Residence: Sibiu, Romania
- Born: 24 September 1993 (age 32) Sibiu, Romania
- Turned pro: 2016
- Plays: Left-Handed, Two-Handed Backhand
- Prize money: US$ 307,056

Singles
- Career record: 0–0
- Career titles: 0
- Highest ranking: No. 786 (22 June 2015)

Doubles
- Career record: 14–34
- Career titles: 15 Challenger, 22 Futures
- Highest ranking: No. 64 (19 February 2024)
- Current ranking: No. 139 (1 September 2025)

Grand Slam doubles results
- Australian Open: 2R (2024, 2025)
- French Open: 1R (2023, 2024)
- Wimbledon: 1R (2024)
- US Open: 1R (2023)
- Last updated on: 6 January 2025.

Victor Vlad Cornea (born 24 September 1993) is a Romanian tennis player who specializes in doubles. He reached his highest ATP doubles ranking of No. 64 on 19 February 2024. He has won 15 ATP Challenger Tour doubles titles.

He has six Davis Cup selections for Team Romania.

== Career ==
Cornea made his Grand Slam debut at the 2023 French Open with Zhang Zhizhen and at the 2023 US Open with Nikola Ćaćić. He reached the semifinals at the ATP 500 2023 Hamburg European Open with Cacic, defeating Bolivian pair of lucky losers Federico Zeballos and Boris Arias, and also Bolivian Hugo Dellien and Argentine Guido Pella. He qualified at the ATP 500 2023 Swiss Indoors as a lucky loser pair with Cacic and reached the quarterfinals by defeating Swiss duo Mika Brunold and Marc-Andrea Hüsler in straight sets.

He recorded his first Grand Slam win on his debut at the 2024 Australian Open partnering with Sriram Balaji as an alternate pair over Italians Matteo Arnaldi and Andrea Pellegrino.

== Career statistics ==
=== Grand Slam tournament performance timeline ===
Key
W	F	SF	QF	#R	RR	Q#	DNQ	A	NH

(W) winner; (F) finalist; (SF) semifinalist; (QF) quarterfinalist; (#R) rounds 4, 3, 2, 1; (RR) round-robin stage; (Q#) qualification round; (DNQ) did not qualify; (A) absent; (NH) not held; (SR) strike rate (events won / competed); (W–L) win–loss record.
To avoid confusion and double counting, these charts are updated at the conclusion of a tournament or when the player's participation has ended.

=== Doubles ===
Current through the 2025 Australian Open.

Tournament	2023	2024	2025	SR	W–L	Win%
Australian Open	A	2R	2R	0 / 2	2–2	50%
French Open	1R	1R	A	0 / 2	0–2	0%
Wimbledon	A	1R	A	0 / 1	0–1	0%
US Open	1R	A	A	0 / 1	0–1	0%
Win–loss	0–2	1–3	1–1	0 / 6	1–6	14%

== ATP Challenger and ITF Tour finals ==
=== Singles: 1 (0–1) ===
Legend ATP Challenger (0–0) ITF Futures/World Tennis Tour (0–1)	Finals by surface Hard (0–0) Clay (0–1)

Result	W–L	Date	Tournament	Tier	Surface	Opponent	Score
Loss	0–1	Jun 2015	Bosnia & Herzegovina F4, Kiseljak	Futures	Clay	(Czech Republic) Pavel Nejedlý	6–7^{(5–7)}, 6–2, 4–6

=== Doubles: 62 (37–25) ===
Legend ATP Challenger (15–11) ITF Futures/World Tennis Tour (22–14)	Finals by surface Hard (8–6) Clay (29–18) Carpet (0–1)

Result	W–L	Date	Tournament	Tier	Surface	Partner	Opponents	Score
Loss	0–1	Jun 2013	Romania F4, Cluj-Napoca	Futures	Clay	(Romania) Tudor Cristian Șulea	(Spain) Carlos Boluda-Purkiss (Spain) Adam Sanjurjo Hermida	7–6^{(7–5)}, 6–7^{(5–7)}, [6–10]
Win	1–1	Jun 2013	Romania F5, Sibiu	Futures	Clay	(Romania) Tudor Cristian Șulea	(Romania) Patrick Ciorcilă (Romania) Victor Crivoi	7–6^{(7–4)}, 1–6, [10–8]
Win	2–1	Jun 2014	Romania F6, Focșani	Futures	Clay	(Romania) Petru-Alexandru Luncanu	(Romania) Alexandru-Daniel Carpen (Moldova) Maxim Dubarenco	7–6^{(8–6)}, 6–1
Loss	2–2	Jul 2014	Romania F7, Pitești-Bascov	Futures	Clay	(Romania) Tudor Cristian Șulea	(Romania) Ilie-Aurelian Giurgiu (Romania) Alexandru Jecan	1–6, 4–6
Win	3–2	Jul 2014	Romania F8, Curtea de Argeș	Futures	Clay	(Romania) Petru-Alexandru Luncanu	(Romania) Bogdan Ionuț Apostol (Romania) Nicolae Frunză	6–2, 6–3
Loss	3–3	Jul 2014	Romania F9, Pitești	Futures	Clay	(Romania) Petru-Alexandru Luncanu	(Romania) Patrick Grigoriu (Romania) Costin Pavăl	7–5, 4–6, [6–10]
Loss	3–4	Jan 2015	Germany F1, Schwieberdingen	Futures	Carpet (i)	(Switzerland) Henri Laaksonen	(Germany) Fabian Fallert (Germany) Florian Fallert	4–6, 3–6
Loss	3–5	May 2015	Romania F2, Galați	Futures	Clay	(Switzerland) Luca Margaroli	(Romania) Petru-Alexandru Luncanu (Lithuania) Lukas Mugevičius	5–7, 4–6
Win	4–5	May 2015	Bosnia & Herzegovina F3, Brčko	Futures	Clay	(Romania) Tudor Cristian Șulea	(Croatia) Ivan Sabanov (Croatia) Matej Sabanov	6–2, 6–4
Win	5–5	Jul 2015	Romania F10, Pitești	Futures	Clay	(Romania) Victor-Mugurel Anagnastopol	(Romania) Matei Adrian Avram (Romania) William Emanuel Birău	7–5, 6–2
Loss	5–6	Aug 2015	Romania F12, Iași	Futures	Clay	(Romania) Alexandru-Daniel Carpen	(Romania) Andrei Ștefan Apostol (Romania) Nicolae Frunză	2–6, 6–3, [7–10]
Win	6–6	Aug 2015	Romania F14, Bucharest	Futures	Clay	(Netherlands) Stephan Fransen	(Romania) Bogdan Borza (Romania) Luca George Tatomir	6–3, 6–3
Loss	6–7	May 2016	Hungary F3, Szeged	Futures	Clay	(Czech Republic) Zdeněk Kolář	(Hungary) Gábor Borsos (Hungary) Ádám Kellner	2–6, 1–6
Win	7–7	May 2016	Bosnia & Herzegovina F1, Doboj	Futures	Clay	(Croatia) Nino Serdarušić	(Ukraine) Danylo Kalenichenko (Austria) David Pichler	6–0, 2–6, [10–8]
Loss	7–8	May 2016	Romania F3, Bucharest	Futures	Clay	(Romania) Victor-Mugurel Anagnastopol	(Romania) Victor Crivoi (Romania) Petru-Alexandru Luncanu	4–6, 6–2, [6–10]
Loss	7–9	Jun 2016	Romania F5, Arad, Romania	Futures	Clay	(Romania) Victor-Mugurel Anagnastopol	(Ukraine) Danylo Kalenichenko (Austria) David Pichler	4–6, 1–6
Loss	7–10	Jun 2016	Romania F8, Curtea de Argeș	Futures	Clay	(Romania) Victor-Mugurel Anagnastopol	(Argentina) Mariano Kestelboim (Romania) Petru-Alexandru Luncanu	1–6, 3–6
Win	8–10	Jul 2016	Romania F10, Cluj-Napoca	Futures	Clay	(Romania) Victor-Mugurel Anagnastopol	(France) Ronan Joncour (Ukraine) Vladyslav Manafov	6–4, 6–2
Win	9–10	Aug 2016	Romania F12, Iași	Futures	Clay	(Romania) Victor-Mugurel Anagnastopol	(Romania) Petru-Alexandru Luncanu (Ukraine) Vladyslav Manafov	6–1, 3–6, [10–6]
Loss	9–11	Aug 2016	Romania F13, Mediaș	Futures	Clay	(Romania) Victor-Mugurel Anagnastopol	(Chile) Nicolás Jarry (Chile) Simón Navarro	3–6, 4–6
Win	10–11	Aug 2016	Romania F15, Brașov	Futures	Clay	(Romania) Victor-Mugurel Anagnastopol	(Romania) Vasile Antonescu (Romania) Alexandru Jecan	4–6, 7–6^{(8–6)}, [10–8]
Win	11–11	Jan 2017	Turkey F3, Antalya	Futures	Hard	(Croatia) Nino Serdarušić	(Ukraine) Vadim Alekseenko (Colombia) Felipe Mantilla	6–3, 6–1
Win	12–11	Mar 2017	Turkey F12, Antalya	Futures	Clay	(Romania) Victor-Mugurel Anagnastopol	(Argentina) Mariano Kestelboim (Argentina) Alejo Vilaró	6–2, 6–2
Loss	12–12	May 2017	Bulgaria F1, Sozopol	Futures	Hard	(Romania) Victor-Mugurel Anagnastopol	(Czech Republic) Michal Konečný (Spain) Roberto Ortega Olmedo	6–4, 5–7, [9–11]
Win	13–12	Aug 2017	Romania F10, Bucharest	Futures	Clay	(Romania) Victor-Mugurel Anagnastopol	(Australia) Nathan Eshmade (Netherlands) Sem Verbeek	7–5, 7–6^{(7–1)}
Loss	13–13	May 2018	Romania F1, Bucharest	Futures	Clay	(Romania) Victor Crivoi	(Romania) Vasile Antonescu (Romania) Patrick Grigoriu	1–6, 4–6
Win	14–13	Aug 2018	Romania F8, Bucharest	Futures	Clay	(Romania) Petru-Alexandru Luncanu	(Romania) Alexandru Vasile Manole (Romania) Dan Alexandru Tomescu	6–2, 6–2
Win	15–13	Oct 2018	Italy F34, Pula	Futures	Clay	(Romania) Alexandru Jecan	(Italy) Marco Bortolotti (Brazil) Diego Matos	7–5, 2–6, [10–6]
Win	16–13	Apr 2019	M25 Pula, Italy	World Tennis Tour	Clay	(Romania) Alexandru Jecan	(Romania) Bogdan Ionuț Apostol (Romania) Nicolae Frunză	6–7^{(5–7)}, 6–4, [10–4]
Loss	16–14	Apr 2019	M25 Pula, Italy	World Tennis Tour	Clay	(Romania) Alexandru Jecan	(United States) Hunter Johnson (United States) Yates Johnson	3–6, 7–6^{(7–2)}, [5–10]
Win	17–14	May 2019	M15 Antalya, Turkey	World Tennis Tour	Clay	(Romania) Alexandru Jecan	(Turkey) Umut Akkoyun (Turkey) Mert Alkaya	6–0, 6–2
Win	18–14	Jul 2019	M25 Cuneo, Italy	World Tennis Tour	Clay	(Romania) Alexandru Jecan	(Argentina) Tomás Martín Etcheverry (Italy) Andrea Gola	6–4, 6–3
Win	19–14	Aug 2019	M25 Pitești, Romania	World Tennis Tour	Clay	(Romania) Alexandru Jecan	(Romania) Vladimir Filip (Romania) Luca George Tatomir	6–2, 6–2
Win	20–14	Mar 2021	M15 Bratislava, Slovakia	World Tennis Tour	Hard (i)	(France) Jonathan Eysseric	(Slovakia) Matej Gálik (Slovakia) Karol Miloš	7–6^{(7–3)}, 6–1
Win	21–14	Mar 2021	M25 Rovinj, Croatia	World Tennis Tour	Clay	(Italy) Marco Bortolotti	(Croatia) Zvonimir Babić (Croatia) Josip Krstanović	3–6, 6–3, [10–5]
Win	22–14	Aug 2021	M25 Bolzano, Italy	World Tennis Tour	Clay	(Greece) Petros Tsitsipas	(Italy) Marco Bortolotti (Brazil) Daniel Dutra da Silva	6–3, 6–4
Win	23–14	Aug 2021	Prague, Czech Republic	Challenger 50	Clay	(Greece) Petros Tsitsipas	(Czech Republic) Martin Krumich (Czech Republic) Andrew Paulson	6–3, 3–6, [10–8]
Loss	23–15	Oct 2021	Lošinj, Croatia	Challenger 80	Clay	(Turkey) Ergi Kırkın	(Slovakia) Andrej Martin (Austria) Tristan-Samuel Weissborn	1–6, 6–7^{(5–7)}
Win	24–15	Jan 2022	Forlì, Italy	Challenger 80	Hard (i)	(Germany) Fabian Fallert	(Czech Republic) Jonáš Forejtek (Netherlands) Jelle Sels	6–4, 6–7^{(6–8)}, [10–7]
Win	25–15	Feb 2022	Forlì, Italy (2)	Challenger 80	Hard (i)	(Germany) Fabian Fallert	(Croatia) Antonio Šančić (Slovakia) Igor Zelenay	6–4, 3–6, [10–2]
Loss	25–16	Feb 2022	Forlì, Italy	Challenger 80	Hard (i)	(Germany) Fabian Fallert	(Italy) Marco Bortolotti (Ukraine) Vitaliy Sachko	6-7^{(5–7)}, 6–3, [5–10]
Loss	25–17	Jul 2022	Pozoblanco, Spain	Challenger 80	Hard	(Venezuela) Luis David Martínez	(France) Dan Added (France) Albano Olivetti	6–3, 1–6, [10–12]
Win	26–17	Aug 2022	Prague, Czech Republic (2)	Challenger 50	Clay	(Czech Republic) Andrew Paulson	(Bulgaria) Adrian Andreev (Bolivia) Murkel Dellien	6–3, 6–1
Win	27–17	Oct 2022	Yokohama, Japan	Challenger 80	Hard	(Philippines) Ruben Gonzales	(Japan) Tomoya Fujiwara (Japan) Masamichi Imamura	7–5, 6–3
Win	28–17	Jan 2023	Oeiras, Portugal	Challenger 50	Hard (i)	(Czech Republic) Petr Nouza	(France) Jonathan Eysseric (France) Pierre-Hugues Herbert	6–3, 7–6^{(7–3)}
Win	29–17	Jan 2023	Tenerife, Spain	Challenger 100	Hard	(Spain) Sergio Martos Gornés	(Finland) Patrik Niklas-Salminen (Netherlands) Bart Stevens	6–3, 6–4
Win	30–17	Feb 2023	Rovereto, Italy	Challenger 75	Hard (i)	(Croatia) Franko Škugor	(Ukraine) Vladyslav Manafov (Ukraine) Oleg Prihodko	6–7^{(3–7)}, 6–2, [10–4]
Loss	30–18	Mar 2023	Biel/Bienne, Switzerland	Challenger 100	Hard (i)	(Croatia) Franko Škugor	(Germany) Constantin Frantzen (Germany) Hendrik Jebens	2–6, 4–6
Win	31–18	Mar 2023	Sanremo, Italy	Challenger 125	Clay	(Croatia) Franko Škugor	(Serbia) Nikola Ćaćić (Brazil) Marcelo Demoliner	6–2, 6–3
Win	32–18	Apr 2023	Oeiras, Portugal	Challenger 125	Clay	(Croatia) Franko Škugor	(Brazil) Marcelo Demoliner (Italy) Andrea Vavassori	7–6^{(7–2)}, 7–6^{(7–4)}
Loss	32–19	Jun 2023	Heilbronn, Germany	Challenger 125	Clay	(Austria) Philipp Oswald	(Germany) Constantin Frantzen (Germany) Hendrik Jebens	6–7^{(7–9)}, 4–6
Win	33–19	Aug 2023	Banja Luka, Bosnia and Herzegovina	Challenger 100	Clay	(Austria) Philipp Oswald	(Kazakhstan) Andrey Golubev (Ukraine) Denys Molchanov	3–6, 6–1, [15–13]
Win	34–19	Mar 2024	Murcia, Spain	Challenger 75	Clay	(France) Théo Arribagé	(India) Arjun Kadhe (India) Jeevan Nedunchezhiyan	7–5, 6–1
Loss	34–20	Mar 2024	Naples, Italy	Challenger 125	Clay	(France) Théo Arribagé	(Argentina) Guido Andreozzi (Mexico) Miguel Ángel Reyes-Varela	4–6, 6–1, [7–10]
Win	35–20	May 2024	Francavilla al Mare, Italy	Challenger 75	Clay	(France) Théo Arribagé	(Netherlands) Sander Arends (Netherlands) Matwé Middelkoop	7–6^{(7–1)}, 7–6^{(9–7)}
Loss	35–21	Aug 2024	Dobrich, Bulgaria	Challenger 50	Clay	(Turkey) Ergi Kırkın	(Peru) Alexander Merino (Germany) Christoph Negritu	4–6, 2–6
Win	36–21	Aug 2024	Como, Italy	Challenger 75	Clay	(Ukraine) Denys Molchanov	(Romania) Alexandru Jecan (Belarus) Ivan Liutarevich	6–2, 6–3
Loss	36–22	Aug 2025	Hersonissos, Greece	Challenger 50	Hard	(Finland) Patrik Niklas-Salminen	(Germany) Mats Rosenkranz (United Kingdom) Harry Wendelken	6–4, 4–6, [7–10]
Win	37–22	Aug 2025	Como, Italy (2)	Challenger 75	Clay	(Argentina) Santiago Rodríguez Taverna	(Israel) Daniel Cukierman (Denmark) Johannes Ingildsen	6–3, 6–2
Loss	37–23	Oct 2025	Olbia, Italy	Challenger 125	Hard	(Spain) Bruno Pujol Navarro	(France) Arthur Reymond (France) Luca Sanchez	4–6, 1–6
Loss	37–24	Jul 2026	Bunschoten, Netherlands	Challenger 75	Clay	(Israel) Daniel Cukierman	(Czech Republic) Andrew Paulson (Belgium) Joran Vliegen	6–7^{(5–7)}, 2–6
Loss	37–25	Sep 2026	Tulln an der Donau, Austria	Challenger 100	Clay	(Austria) Maximilian Neuchrist	(Slovakia) Miloš Karol (Czech Republic) Andrew Paulson	3–6, 6–3, [7–10]
