= Miloš Karol =

Slovak tennis player (born 2002)

- Country (sports): Slovakia
- Born: 13 December 2002 (age 23) Trnava, Slovakia
- Height: 1.98 m (6 ft 6 in)
- Plays: Right-handed (two-handed backhand)
- Prize money: US $144,723

Singles
- Career record: 0–0
- Career titles: 0 Challenger, 2 ITF
- Highest ranking: No. 356 (15 September 2025)
- Current ranking: No. 443 (8 June 2026)

Doubles
- Career record: 0–0
- Career titles: 8 Challenger, 11 ITF
- Highest ranking: No. 108 (8 June 2026)
- Current ranking: No. 127 (2 November 2026)

Team competitions
- Davis Cup: Doubles: 2–2
- Last updated on: 7 November 2026.

Miloš Karol (born 13 December 2002) is a Slovak tennis player. He has a career high ATP singles ranking of world No. 356 achieved on 15 September 2025 and a doubles ranking of No. 108 achieved on 8 June 2026. He is currently the No. 4 Slovak player. Karol has won eight ATP Challenger doubles titles.

== Career ==
In 2024 and 2025, Karol has won two ATP Challenger doubles titles at the 2024 NÖ Open with Vitaliy Sachko, and at the 2025 Istanbul Challenger with Daniel Masur.

In 2026 he won six more doubles titles - in Croatia (2026 Split Open), in Slovakia (2026 Košice Open), in the Czech Republic (2026 UniCredit Czech Open), in Austria (2026 NÖ Open), in Bulgaria (2026 Plovdiv Challenger IV), and in Portugal (2026 Maia Challenger).

== ATP Challenger and ITF Tour finals ==
=== Singles: 7 (2 titles, 5 runner-ups) ===
Legend (singles) ITF World Tennis Tour (2–5)	Titles by surface Hard (2–2) Clay (0–3)

Result	W–L	Date	Tournament	Tier	Surface	Opponent	Score
Loss	0–1	Sep 2023	M15 Vienna, Austria	WTT	Clay	(Germany) Peter Heller	6–7^{(7–9)}, 2–6
Loss	0–2	Sep 2024	M15 Vienna, Austria	WTT	Clay	(Slovakia) Andrej Martin	2–6, 1–6
Loss	0–3	Sep 2024	M15 Pardubice, Czech Republic	WTT	Clay	(Czech Republic) Maxim Mrva	4–6, 5–7
Loss	0–4	Sep 2024	M15 Trnava, Slovakia	WTT	Hard (i)	(Slovakia) Lukáš Pokorný	6–7^{(2–7)}, 2–6
Loss	0–5	Oct 2024	M15 Trnava, Slovakia	WTT	Hard (i)	(Russia) Evgeny Karlovskiy	6–3, 5–7, 3–6
Win	1–5	Oct 2024	M25 Trnava, Slovakia	WTT	Hard (i)	(Austria) Dennis Novak	6–2, 6–4
Win	2–5	Mar 2026	M15 Monastir, Tunisia	WTT	Hard	(France) Leo Raquillet	6–3, 7–5

=== Doubles: 46 (20 titles, 26 runners-up) ===
Legend (doubles) ATP Challenger Tour (9–9) ITF World Tennis Tour (11–17)	Titles by surface Hard (5–8) Clay (15–18)

Result	W–L	Date	Tournament	Tier	Surface	Partner	Opponent	Score
Loss	0–1	Mar 2021	M15 Bratislava, Slovakia	WTT	Hard (i)	(Slovakia) Matej Gálik	(Romania) Victor Vlad Cornea (France) Jonathan Eysseric	6–7^{(3–7)}, 1–6
Win	1–1	Aug 2021	M25 Frankfurt am Main, Germany	WTT	Clay	(Colombia) Alejandro Gómez	(Argentina) Juan Ignacio Galarza (Argentina) Mariano Kestelboim	6–3, 6–3
Loss	1–2	Nov 2021	M15 Ostrava, Czech Republic	WTT	Hard (i)	(Slovakia) Lukáš Pokorný	(Czech Republic) Filip Duda (Czech Republic) Adam Pavlásek	4–6, 4–6
Loss	1–3	May 2022	M15 Doboj, Bosnia and Herzegovina	WTT	Clay	(Slovakia) Lukáš Pokorný	(Ukraine) Oleksandr Bielinskyi (Japan) Rimpei Kawakami	6–3, 6–7^{(3–7)}, [6–10]
Loss	1–4	Jul 2022	M25 Poprad, Slovakia	WTT	Clay	(Slovakia) Lukáš Pokorný	(Sweden) Simon Freund (Denmark) Johannes Ingildsen	4–6, 2–6
Loss	1–5	Jul 2022	M15 Innsbruck, Austria	WTT	Clay	(Czech Republic) Adam Jurajda	(Austria) Sandro Kopp (Austria) Neil Oberleitner	2–6, 2–6
Loss	1–6	Jul 2022	M15 Łódź, Poland	WTT	Clay	(Slovakia) Lukáš Pokorný	(Poland) Szymon Kielan (Czech Republic) Petr Nouza	5–7, 4–6
Win	2–6	Aug 2022	M15 Kottingbrunn, Austria	WTT	Clay	(United States) Toby Kodat	(Italy) Francesco Ferrari (Italy) Alessio Zanotti	7–6^{(7–3)}, 7–5
Loss	2–7	Sep 2022	M25 Pardubice, Czech Republic	WTT	Clay	(United States) Toby Kodat	(Czech Republic) Matyáš Černý (Czech Republic) Dominik Reček	4–6, 2–6
Win	3–7	Oct 2022	M15 Heraklion, Greece	WTT	Hard	(Austria) David Pichler	(Netherlands) Dax Donders (Netherlands) Sidané Pontjodikromo	6–4, 5–7, [10–7]
Win	4–7	May 2023	M15 Prijedor, Bosnia and Herzegovina	WTT	Clay	(Morocco) Adam Moundir	(Czech Republic) Petr Brunclík; Vitali Shvets	6–3, 7–5
Loss	4–8	Jul 2023	M25 Telfs, Austria	WTT	Clay	(Austria) Sandro Kopp	(Germany) Jakob Schnaitter (Germany) Mark Wallner	4–6, 7–6^{(9–7)}, [5–10]
Loss	4–9	Aug 2023	M25 Łódź, Poland	WTT	Clay	(Poland) Szymon Kielan	(Czech Republic) Matyáš Černý (Czech Republic) Daniel Pátý	3–6, 3–6
Loss	4–10	Aug 2023	M15 Kottingbrunn, Austria	WTT	Clay	(Austria) David Pichler	(Czech Republic) Dominik Kellovský (Austria) Joel Schwärzler	6–3, 3–6, [4–10]
Loss	4–11	Nov 2023	M15 Monastir, Tunisia	WTT	Hard	(Germany) Adrian Oetzbach	(Peru) Alexander Merino (Germany) Christoph Negritu	3–6, 1–6
Loss	4–12	Feb 2024	M15 Monastir, Tunisia	WTT	Hard	(Switzerland) Jakub Paul	(Peru) Alexander Merino (Germany) Christoph Negritu	3–6, 3–6
Loss	4–13	Mar 2024	M15 Monastir, Tunisia	WTT	Hard	(Sweden) Fred Simonsson	(Peru) Alexander Merino (Germany) Christoph Negritu	6–7^{(3–7)}, 3–6
Loss	4–14	May 2024	M15 Villach, Austria	WTT	Clay	(Germany) Adrian Oetzbach	(Austria) Nico Hipfl (Switzerland) Jérôme Kym	4–6, 3–6
Win	5–14	Jun 2024	M15 Gyula, Hungary	WTT	Clay	(Germany) Tim Rühl	(Czech Republic) Filip Apltauer (Czech Republic) Matyáš Černý	6–0, 7–6^{(7–2)}
Loss	5–15	Jun 2024	Bratislava, Slovakia	Challenger	Clay	(Slovakia) Tomáš Lánik	(Germany) Jakob Schnaitter (Germany) Mark Wallner	4–6, 4–6
Win	6–15	Jun 2024	M15 Nyíregyháza, Hungary	WTT	Clay	(United Kingdom) Michael Shaw	(Hungary) Attila Boros (Hungary) Botond Kisantal	6–3, 6–3
Loss	6–16	Jun 2024	M25 Satu Mare, Romania	WTT	Clay	(United Kingdom) Michael Shaw	(Bulgaria) Petr Nesterov (Ukraine) Vladyslav Orlov	4–6, 2–6
Loss	6–17	Jul 2024	M15 Poprad, Slovakia	WTT	Clay	(Slovakia) Tomáš Lánik	(Czech Republic) Petr Brunclík (Czech Republic) Jakub Filip	4–6, 4–6
Loss	6–18	Aug 2024	Liberec, Czech Republic	Challenger	Clay	(Slovakia) Tomáš Lánik	(Czech Republic) Jonáš Forejtek (Czech Republic) Michael Vrbenský	5–7, 7–6^{(7–5)}, [4–10]
Win	7–18	Aug 2024	M15 Neulengbach, Austria	WTT	Clay	(Slovakia) Tomáš Lánik	(Austria) Tobias Leitner (Austria) Lukas Rohseano	6–2, 6–2
Win	8–18	Aug 2024	M15 Arad, Romania	WTT	Clay	(Italy) Matteo De Vincentis	(Romania) Patrick Grigoriu (Romania) Daniel Uță	6–3, 7–6^{(7–3)}
Win	9–18	Sep 2024	M15 Vienna, Austria	WTT	Clay	(Slovakia) Tomáš Lánik	(Netherlands) Daniel de Jonge (Germany) Jannik Opitz	7–6^{(7–2)}, 6–4
Win	10–18	Sep 2024	Tulln an der Donau, Austria	Challenger	Clay	(Ukraine) Vitaliy Sachko	(Poland) Karol Drzewiecki (Poland) Piotr Matuszewski	6–4, 2–6, [11–9]
Win	11–18	Sep 2024	M15 Trnava, Slovakia	WTT	Hard (i)	(Slovakia) Tomáš Lánik	(Germany) Tim Rühl (Germany) Kai Wehnelt	7–6^{(7–4)}, 7–5
Loss	11–19	Oct 2024	M25 Trnava, Slovakia	WTT	Hard (i)	(Ukraine) Vitaliy Sachko	(Switzerland) Rémy Bertola (Italy) Filippo Romano	3–6, 3–6
Win	12–19	Feb 2025	M15 Oberhaching, Germany	WTT	Hard (i)	(Italy) Giovanni Oradini	(Germany) Aaron Funk (Germany) Mika Petkovic	6–3, 6–3
Loss	12–20	Jul 2025	Modena, Italy	Challenger	Clay	(Denmark) Johannes Ingildsen	(Argentina) Federico Agustín Gómez (Venezuela) Luis David Martínez	5–7, 6–7^{(5–7)}
Loss	12–21	Jul 2025	San Marino, San Marino	Challenger	Clay	(Ukraine) Vitaliy Sachko	(Poland) Karol Drzewiecki (Chinese Taipei) Ray Ho	5–7, 6–7^{(3–7)}
Loss	12–22	Aug 2025	Sofia, Bulgaria	Challenger	Clay	(Finland) Patrik Niklas-Salminen	(Serbia) Stefan Latinović; Marat Sharipov	3–6, 6–2, [11–13]
Win	13–22	Sep 2025	Istanbul, Turkey	Challenger	Hard	(Germany) Daniel Masur	(Greece) Stefanos Sakellaridis (India) Karan Singh	7–6^{(7–2)}, 6–1
Loss	13–23	Oct 2025	Hamburg, Germany	Challenger	Hard (i)	(Finland) Patrik Niklas-Salminen	(Belgium) Michael Geerts (Germany) Tim Rühl	6–7^{(6–8)}, 5–7
Loss	13–24	Jan 2026	Nottingham, United Kingdom	Challenger	Hard (i)	(Germany) Daniel Masur	(United Kingdom) Charles Broom (United Kingdom) David Stevenson	2–6, 6–7^{(5–7)}
Win	14–24	Mar 2026	Split, Croatia	Challenger	Clay	(Croatia) Mili Poljičak	(Bosnia and Herzegovina) Mirza Bašić (Bosnia and Herzegovina) Andrej Nedić	6–2, 6–2
Loss	14–25	Mar 2026	Barletta, Italy	Challenger	Clay	(Ukraine) Vitaliy Sachko	(Czech Republic) Filip Duda (Serbia) Stefan Latinović	6–7^{(4–7)}, 7–6^{(8–6)}, [11–13]
Loss	14–26	Apr 2026	Rome, Italy	Challenger	Clay	(Czech Republic) Andrew Paulson	(Colombia) Nicolás Barrientos (Uruguay) Ariel Behar	6–7^{(4–7)}, 6–4, [7–10]
Win	15–26	May 2026	Košice, Slovakia	Challenger	Clay	(Croatia) Nino Serdarušić	(Slovakia) Lukáš Pokorný (Czech Republic) David Poljak	5–7, 7–6^{(7–4)}, [10–5]
Win	16–26	Jun 2026	Prostějov, Czech Republic	Challenger	Clay	(Czech Republic) Andrew Paulson	Ivan Liutarevich (Poland) Filip Pieczonka	6–3, 6–3
Win	17–26	Sep 2026	Tulln an der Donau, Austria	Challenger	Clay	(Czech Republic) Andrew Paulson	(Romania) Victor Vlad Cornea (Austria) Maximilian Neuchrist	6–3, 3–6, [10–7]
Win	18–26	Sep 2026	Plovdiv, Bulgaria	Challenger	Clay	(Czech Republic) Andrew Paulson	(Romania) Bogdan Pavel (Spain) Benjamín Winter López	6–3, 6–4
Win	19–26	Oct 2026	Maia, Portugal	Challenger	Clay (i)	(Czech Republic) Andrew Paulson	(Portugal) Tiago Pereira (Spain) Benjamín Winter López	4–6, 6–1, [11–9]
Win	20–26	Nov 2026	Bratislava, Slovakia	Challenger	Hard (i)	(Czech Republic) Andrew Paulson	(Netherlands) Jean-Julien Rojer (United States) Theodore Winegar	7–6^{(7–3)}, 6–3
