= NÖ Open =

- 2025 NÖ Open

ATP Challenger Tour
- Event name: NÖ Open
- Location: Tulln an der Donau, Austria
- Venue: TC Tulln
- Category: ATP Challenger Tour 100
- Surface: Clay
- Draw: 32S/32Q/16D
- Website: website

The NÖ Open is a professional tennis tournament played on clay courts. It is currently part of the ATP Challenger Tour. It is held annually in Tulln an der Donau, Austria since 2021.

== Past finals ==
=== Singles ===
Year	Champion	Runner-up	Score
2026	(Switzerland) Mika Brunold	(Brazil) João Lucas Reis da Silva	6–4, 6–3
2025	(Argentina) Marco Trungelliti	(Czech Republic) Andrew Paulson	7–5, 6–1
2024	(United Kingdom) Jan Choinski	(Austria) Lukas Neumayer	6–4, 6–1
2023	(Czech Republic) Vít Kopřiva	(India) Sumit Nagal	6–2, 6–4
2022	(Slovakia) Jozef Kovalík	(Netherlands) Jelle Sels	7–6^{(8–6)}, 7–6^{(7–3)}
2021	(Germany) Mats Moraing	(France) Hugo Gaston	6–2, 6–1

=== Doubles ===
Year	Champions	Runners-up	Score
2026	(Slovakia) Miloš Karol (Czech Republic) Andrew Paulson	(Romania) Victor Vlad Cornea (Austria) Maximilian Neuchrist	6–3, 3–6, [10–7]
2025	(Austria) Neil Oberleitner (Austria) Joel Schwärzler	(Ukraine) Oleg Prihodko (Ukraine) Vitaliy Sachko	5–7, 6–3, [10–7]
2024	(Slovakia) Miloš Karol (Ukraine) Vitaliy Sachko	(Poland) Karol Drzewiecki (Poland) Piotr Matuszewski	6–4, 2–6, [11–9]
2023	(Czech Republic) Zdeněk Kolář (Slovenia) Blaž Rola	(Poland) Piotr Matuszewski (Germany) Kai Wehnelt	6–4, 4–6, [10–6]
2022	(Austria) Alexander Erler (Austria) Lucas Miedler	(Czech Republic) Zdeněk Kolář (Ukraine) Denys Molchanov	6–3, 6–4
2021	(Germany) Dustin Brown (Italy) Andrea Vavassori	(Brazil) Rafael Matos (Brazil) Felipe Meligeni Alves	7–6^{(7–5)}, 6–1
