= Andrew Paulson (tennis) =

Czech tennis player (born 2001)

- Country (sports): Czech Republic
- Born: 16 November 2001 (age 24) Prague, Czech Republic
- Height: 1.91 m (6 ft 3 in)
- Plays: Right-handed (two-handed backhand)
- Prize money: US $237,434

Singles
- Career record: 0–0
- Career titles: 0 Challenger, 7 Futures
- Highest ranking: No. 302 (6 November 2023)
- Current ranking: No. 1,090 (16 November 2026)

Doubles
- Career record: 1–1
- Career titles: 12 Challenger, 11 Futures
- Highest ranking: No. 65 (16 November 2026)
- Current ranking: No. 65 (16 November 2026)
- Last updated on: 16 November 2026.

Andrew Paulson (born 16 November 2001) is a Czech tennis player. Paulson has a career-high ATP singles ranking of No. 302 achieved on 6 November 2023 and a career-high doubles ranking of No. 65 achieved on 16 November 2026.

Paulson has won twelve ATP Challenger doubles titles, seven of them in 2023.

== Career ==
He won his maiden Challenger title at the 2022 IBG Prague Open with Victor Vlad Cornea, defeating Adrian Andreev and Murkel Dellien.

== Challenger and World Tennis Tour finals ==
=== Singles: 10 (7–3) ===
Legend (singles) ATP Challenger Tour (0–1) ITF World Tennis Tour (7–2)	Titles by surface Hard (1–1) Clay (5–2) Grass (0–0) Carpet (1–0)

Result	W–L	Date	Tournament	Tier	Surface	Opponent	Score
Win	1–0	Oct 2019	M15 Liberec, Czech Republic	World Tennis Tour	Carpet (i)	(Czech Republic) Petr Michnev	7-6^{(7–3)}, 6–1
Win	2–0	Nov 2021	M15 Ostrava, Czech Republic	World Tennis Tour	Hard (i)	(Germany) Marvin Möller	6-3, 7-6^{(8–6)}
Loss	2-1	Feb 2022	M15 Monastir, Tunisia	World Tennis Tour	Hard	(Spain) Alberto Barroso Campos	2-6, 0–6
Win	3-1	May 2022	M15 Most, Czech Republic	World Tennis Tour	Clay	(Austria) Maximilian Neuchrist	6–3, 6–3
Win	4-1	Oct 2022	M15 Prostějov, Czech Republic	World Tennis Tour	Clay	(Czech Republic) Daniel Siniakov	6–4, 6–3
Loss	4-2	Jun 2023	M25 Poprad, Slovakia	World Tennis Tour	Clay	(Czech Republic) Patrik Rikl	6–3, 6–7^{(5–7)}, 4–6
Win	5-2	Jul 2023	M25 Kassel, Germany	World Tennis Tour	Clay	(Brazil) Daniel Dutra da Silva	6–4, 6–2
Win	6-2	Aug 2023	M25 Łódź, Poland	World Tennis Tour	Clay	(Czech Republic) Daniel Pátý	6–4, 4–6, 6–4
Win	7-2	Oct 2023	M25 Zlatibor, Serbia	World Tennis Tour	Clay	(Monaco) Valentin Vacherot	6–3, 5–7, 6–3
Loss	7-3	Sep 2025	Tulln, Austria	Challenger	Clay	(Argentina) Marco Trungelliti	5-7, 1–6

=== Doubles: 41 (32–9) ===
Legend (doubles) ATP Challenger Tour (21–7) ITF World Tennis Tour (11–2)	Titles by surface Hard (9–1) Clay (22–8) Grass (0–0) Carpet (1–0)

Result	W–L	Date	Tournament	Tier	Surface	Partner	Opponents	Score
Win	1–0	Nov 2019	M15 Milovice, Czech Republic	World Tennis Tour	Hard	(Czech Republic) Petr Michnev	(Italy) Francesco Vilardo (United Kingdom) Mark Whitehouse	6-1, 7–5
Win	2–0	Feb 2020	M15 Grenoble, France	World Tennis Tour	Hard	(Russia) Artem Dubrivnyy	(Germany) Fabian Fallert (Germany) Hendrik Jebens	7-6^{(7–4)}, 3–6, 10–7
Win	3–0	Feb 2021	M15 St. Petersburg, Russia	World Tennis Tour	Hard	(Czech Republic) Patrik Rikl	(Moldova) Alexandr Cozbinov (Ukraine) Marat Deviatiarov	4-6, 6–4, 10–8
Win	4–0	Feb 2021	M15 St. Petersburg, Russia	World Tennis Tour	Hard	(Czech Republic) Patrik Rikl	(Russia) Artem Dubrivnyy (Russia) Alexey Zakharov	3-6, 7-6^{(7–5)}, 10–2
Loss	4–1	May 2021	Ostrava, Czech Republic	Challenger	Clay	(Czech Republic) Patrik Rikl	(Australia) Marc Polmans (Ukraine) Sergiy Stakhovsky	6-7^{(4–7)}, 6–3, 7–10
Loss	4–2	May 2021	M25 Prague, Czech Republic	World Tennis Tour	Clay	(Czech Republic) Patrik Rikl	(Italy) Franco Agamenone (Poland) Piotr Matuszewski	4-6, 3–6
Win	5–2	May 2021	M25 Jablonec nad Nisou, Czech Republic	World Tennis Tour	Clay	(Czech Republic) Patrik Rikl	(Belarus) Uladzimir Ignatik (Ukraine) Vitaliy Sachko	0-6, 6–2, 10–7
Loss	5–3	Aug 2021	M15 Bratislava, Slovakia	World Tennis Tour	Clay	(Czech Republic) Robin Stanek	(Hungary) Mate Valkusz (Hungary) Zsombor Velcz	6-3, 6-7^{(6–8)}, 7–10
Win	6–3	Sep 2021	M25 Pardubice, Czech Republic	World Tennis Tour	Clay	(Czech Republic) Antonin Bolardt	(Czech Republic) Filip Duda (Czech Republic) Adam Pavlasek	6-4, 3–6, 10–8
Win	7–3	Oct 2021	M25 Prague, Czech Republic	World Tennis Tour	Hard	(Czech Republic) David Poljak	(Czech Republic) Filip Duda (Czech Republic) Adam Pavlasek	7-5, 6–1
Win	8–3	Feb 2022	M15 Monastir, Tunisia	World Tennis Tour	Hard	(Czech Republic) Antonin Bolardt	(Japan) Shinji Hazawa (Netherlands) Ryan Nijboer	6-0, 7–5
Win	9–3	Mar 2022	M25 Trento, Italy	World Tennis Tour	Hard	(France) Dan Added	(Germany) TIM Handel (Switzerland) Yannik Steinegger	6-4, 3–6, 10–8
Win	10–3	Mar 2022	M25 Trimbach, Switzerland	World Tennis Tour	Carpet	(Czech Republic) Petr Nouza	(Germany) Daniel Masur (Switzerland) Yannik Steinegger	6-4, 6–4
Loss	10–4	May 2022	Prague, Czech Republic	Challenger	Clay	(Czech Republic) Adam Pavlasek	(Portugal) Nuno Borges (Portugal) Francisco Cabral	4-6, 7-6^{(7–3)}, 5–10
Win	11–4	Aug 2022	Prague, Czech Republic	Challenger	Clay	(Romania) Victor Vlad Cornea	(Bulgaria) Adrian Andreev (Bolivia) Murkel Dellien	6-3, 6–1
Win	12–4	Sep 2022	M25 Szabolcsveresmart, Hungary	World Tennis Tour	Clay	(Czech Republic) Michael Vrbensky	(Ukraine) Georgii Kravchenko (Czech Republic) Petr Nouza	6-3, 3–6, 10–8
Loss	12–5	Nov 2022	Bratislava, Slovakia	Challenger	Hard	(Czech Republic) Petr Nouza	(Ukraine) Denys Molchanov (Kazakhstan) Aleksandr Nedovyesov	6-4, 4–6, 6–10
Win	13–5	May 2023	Prague, Slovakia	Challenger	Clay	(Czech Republic) Petr Nouza	(Czech Republic) Jiří Barnat (Czech Republic) Jan Hrazdil	6-4, 6–3
Win	14–5	May 2023	Skopje, North Macedonia	Challenger	Clay	(Czech Republic) Petr Nouza	(India) Sriram Balaji (India) Jeevan Nedunchezhiyan	7–6^{(7–5)}, 6–3
Win	15–5	Aug 2023	Liberec, Czech Republic	Challenger	Clay	(Czech Republic) Petr Nouza	(Austria) Neil Oberleitner (Germany) Tim Sandkaulen	6–3, 6–4
Win	16–5	Aug 2023	Prague, Czech Republic	Challenger	Clay	(Czech Republic) Petr Nouza	(Sweden) Filip Bergevi (Netherlands) Mick Veldheer	7–5, 6–3
Win	17–5	Sep 2023	Szczecin, Poland	Challenger	Clay	(Ukraine) Vitaliy Sachko	(Czech Republic) Zdenek Kolar (Spain) Sergio Martos Gornés	6–3, 7–6^{(8–6)}
Win	18–5	Sep 2023	Sibiu, Romania	Challenger	Clay	(Czech Republic) Michael Vrbenský	(Poland) Piotr Matuszewski (Germany) Kai Wehnelt	6–2, 6–2
Win	19–5	Oct 2023	Ortisei, Italy	Challenger	Hard	(Czech Republic) Patrik Rikl	(Austria) Maximilian Neuchrist (Switzerland) Jakub Paul	4–6, 7–6^{(9–7)}, 11–9
Loss	19–6	May 2024	Skopje, North Macedonia	Challenger	Clay	(Czech Republic) Patrik Rikl	(United States) Ryan Seggerman (United States) Patrik Trhac	3–6, 6–7^{(4–7)}
Loss	19–7	Aug 2024	Cordenons, Italy	Challenger	Clay	(Czech Republic) Jiri Barnat	(Italy) Marco Bortolotti (Australia) Matthew Romios	w/o
Win	20–7	May 2025	Skopje, North Macedonia	Challenger	Clay	(Czech Republic) Michael Vrbensky	(India) Sriram Balaji (Mexico) Miguel-Angel Reyes-Varela	2–6, 6–4, 10–6
Win	21–7	Jun 2025	Bratislava, Slovakia	Challenger	Clay	(Czech Republic) Matej Vocel	(Czech Republic) Jiri Barnat (Czech Republic) Filip Duda	6–1, 6–4
Win	22–7	Aug 2025	Liberec, Czech Republic	Challenger	Clay	(Czech Republic) Michael Vrbensky	(Czech Republic) Jiri Barnat (Czech Republic) Filip Duda	6–4, 6–1
Win	23–7	Aug 2025	Cordenons, Italy	Challenger	Clay	(Czech Republic) Michael Vrbensky	(Bolivia) Boris Arias (Bolivia) Murkel Dellien	6–4, 6–2
Win	24–7	Apr 2026	Madrid, Spain	Challenger	Clay	(Czech Republic) Michael Vrbensky	(United States) George Goldhoff (United States) Trey Hilderbrand	2–6, 6–4, [10–8]
Loss	24–8	Apr 2026	Rome, Italy	Challenger	Clay	(Slovakia) Miloš Karol	(Colombia) Nicolás Barrientos (Uruguay) Ariel Behar	6–7^{(4–7)}, 6–4, [7–10]
Win	25–8	Jun 2026	Prostějov, Czech Republic	Challenger	Clay	(Slovakia) Miloš Karol	Ivan Liutarevich (Poland) Filip Pieczonka	6–3, 6–3
Win	26–8	Jul 2026	Bunschoten, Netherlands	Challenger	Clay	(Belgium) Joran Vliegen	(Romania) Victor Vlad Cornea (Israel) Daniel Cukierman	7–6^{(7–5)}, 6–2
Loss	26–9	Jul 2026	Zug, Switzerland	Challenger	Clay	(Czech Republic) David Poljak	(Netherlands) Thijmen Loof (Japan) Kaito Uesugi	4–6, 2–6
Win	27–9	Aug 2026	Prague, Czech Republic	Challenger	Clay	(Belgium) Joran Vliegen	(Sweden) Erik Grevelius (Sweden) Adam Heinonen	6–4, 6–3
Win	28–9	Sep 2026	Tulln an der Donau, Austria	Challenger	Clay	(Slovakia) Miloš Karol	(Romania) Victor Vlad Cornea (Austria) Maximilian Neuchrist	6–3, 3–6, [10–7]
Win	29–9	Sep 2026	Szczecin, Poland	Challenger	Clay	(Portugal) Tiago Pereira	(Spain) Iñigo Cervantes (Ukraine) Denys Molchanov	6–2, 6–0
Win	30–9	Sep 2026	Plovdiv, Bulgaria	Challenger	Clay	(Slovakia) Miloš Karol	(Romania) Bogdan Pavel (Spain) Benjamín Winter López	6–3, 6–4
Win	31–9	Oct 2026	Maia, Portugal	Challenger	Clay (i)	(Slovakia) Miloš Karol	(Portugal) Tiago Pereiral (Spain) Benjamín Winter López	4–6, 6–1, [11–9]
Win	32–9	Nov 2026	Bratislava, Slovakia	Challenger	Hard (i)	(Slovakia) Miloš Karol	(Netherlands) Jean-Julien Rojer (United States) Theodore Winegar	7–6^{(7–3)}, 6–3

== Junior Grand Slam finals ==
=== Doubles: 1 (1 runner-up) ===
Result	Year	Tournament	Surface	Partner	Opponents	Score
Loss	2019	US Open	Hard	(Belarus) Alexander Zgirovsky	(United States) Eliot Spizzirri (United States) Tyler Zink	6–7^{(4–7)}, 4–6

== Private life ==
In 2024, he started dating Czech tennis player Markéta Vondroušová.
