= Joel Schwärzler =

Austrian tennis player (born 2006)

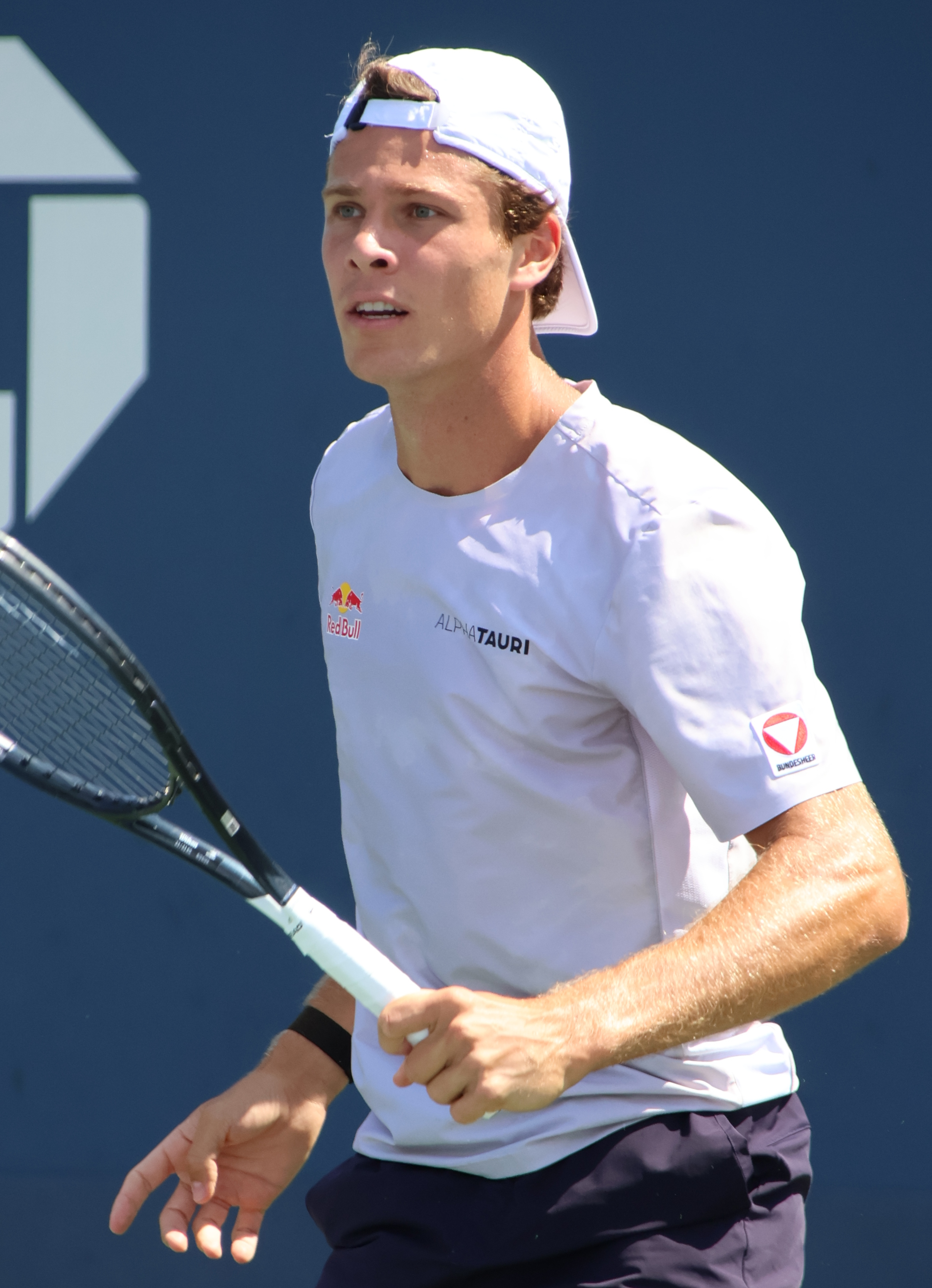
- Schwärzler at the 2026 US Open
- Full name: Joel Josef Schwärzler
- ITF name: Joel Schwaerzler
- Country (sports): Austria
- Born: 27 January 2006 (age 20) Sandton, South Africa
- Height: 1.88 m (6 ft 2 in)
- Plays: Left-handed (two-handed backhand)
- Coach: Julian Schwärzler
- Prize money: US $364,894

Singles
- Career record: 0–5 (at ATP Tour level, Grand Slam level, and in Davis Cup)
- Career titles: 0
- Highest ranking: No. 150 (10 August 2026)
- Current ranking: No. 150 (10 August 2026)

Grand Slam singles results
- French Open: Q2 (2026)
- Wimbledon: Q1 (2026)
- US Open: Q2 (2026)

Doubles
- Career record: 4–5 (at ATP Tour level, Grand Slam level, and in Davis Cup)
- Career titles: 0
- Highest ranking: No. 202 (12 January 2026)
- Current ranking: No. 295 (10 August 2026)
- Last updated on: 10 August 2026.

Joel Josef Schwärzler (born 27 January 2006) is an Austrian professional tennis player. He has a career-high ATP singles ranking of No. 150 achieved on 10 August 2026 and a doubles ranking of No. 202, reached on 12 January 2026. He is currently the No. 3 singles player from Austria.

== Early life ==
Schwärzler is the son of a South African mother and an Austrian father. He grew up in Hard, Austria. He began playing tennis at the age of 5.

He began training at the ÖTV performance centre in Südstadt in 2021.

== Junior career ==
Schwärzler won the Austrian U18 national championship titles in singles and doubles in 2022, and followed this up by winning the U16 European Championships in July 2022 in Přerov, Czechia, defeating top seed Martín Landaluce in the final.

In September 2023, Schwärzler was a runner-up in the boys' doubles category at the 2023 US Open, with Italian Federico Bondioli. The pair lost to Max Dahlin and Oliver Ojakäär, despite twice having a match point. In October, Schwärzler won two singles titles in a row, claiming victory at J500 event in Osaka and following that up with victory at the ITF Junior Masters event in Chengdu, China. He defeated Mexican Rodrigo Pacheco Méndez in the boys’ final. He became the first Austrian player to win the title.

At the 2024 French Open, Schwärzler won his first Grand Slam Junior title, in the boys' doubles, partnering with Norwegian Nicolai Budkov Kjær.

The Austrian had good results on the ITF junior circuit, maintaining a 105–46 singles win-loss record and reached an ITF junior combined ranking of world No. 1 on 29 January 2024.

== Professional career ==
=== 2024-25: Challenger title, ATP & top 300 debuts ===
In 2024, Schwärzler won his first Challenger title at the 2024 Macedonian Open, defeating Sergey Fomin, Ergi Kırkın, Andrew Paulson, Gerard Campaña Lee and Kamil Majchrzak in the process. He achieved a new career high ranking of No. 387 with the win, and became the youngest player (born in 2006) to win a Challenger title, followed by Gabriel Debru and Learner Tien who were also champions in 2024 at that level. He was also just the fourth player to win an ATP Challenger Tour title while holding the Junior No. 1 ranking after Nick Kyrgios, Taylor Fritz and Wu Yibing.

Schwärzler made his ATP debut at the 2024 Generali Open Kitzbühel, losing to Thiago Seyboth Wild in the first round. He also received a wildcard for the 2024 Erste Bank Open but lost to top seed Alexander Zverev.

Joel Schwärzler and Neil Oberleitner reached the doubles final of the 2025 Generali Open Kitzbühel, but lost to Petr Nouza and Patrik Rikl. It was the first ATP Tour final for both players.

On 25 August 2025, Schwärzler made his top 300 singles debut after reaching the final in Sofia, Bulgaria but lost to qualifier Alex Molčan.

== ATP Tour finals ==
=== Doubles: 1 (runner-up) ===
Legend Grand Slam (–) ATP 1000 (–) ATP 500 (–) ATP 250 (0–1)	Finals by surface Hard (–) Clay (0–1) Grass (–)	Finals by setting Outdoor (0–1) Indoor (–)

Result	W–L	Date	Tournament	Tier	Surface	Partner	Opponents	Score
Loss	0–1	Jul 2025	Generali Open Kitzbühel, Austria	ATP 250	Clay	(Austria) Neil Oberleitner	(Czech Republic) Petr Nouza (Czech Republic) Patrik Rikl	6–1, 6–7^{(3–7)}, [5–10]

== ATP Challenger Tour finals ==
=== Singles: 5 (3 titles, 2 runner-ups) ===
Finals by surface
Hard (1–1)
Clay (2–1)

Result	W–L	Date	Tournament	Tier	Surface	Opponent	Score
Win	1–0	May 2024	Macedonian Open, North Macedonia	Challenger	Clay	(Poland) Kamil Majchrzak	6–3, 6–3
Loss	1–1	Aug 2025	Genesis Cup II, Bulgaria	Challenger	Clay	(Slovakia) Alex Molčan	5–7, 4–6
Loss	1–2	Feb 2026	Challenger Città di Lugano, Switzerland	Challenger	Hard (i)	(Hungary) Zsombor Piros	5–7, 6–4, 3–6
Win	2–2	Mar 2026	Rwanda Challenger, Rwanda	Challenger	Clay	(Italy) Stefano Napolitano	7–6^{(7–5)}, 7–6^{(8–6)}
Win	3–2	Aug 2026	Mazovia Open, Poland	Challenger	Hard	(Italy) Andrea Guerrieri	7–6^{(7–4)}, 6–1

=== Doubles: 2 (2 titles) ===
Result	W–L	Date	Tournament	Tier	Surface	Partner	Opponents	Score
Win	1–0	Sep 2025	NÖ Open, Austria	Challenger	Clay	(Austria) Neil Oberleitner	(Ukraine) Oleg Prihodko (Ukraine) Vitaliy Sachko	5–7, 6–3, [10–7]
Win	2–0	Jan 2026	Nonthaburi Challenger, Thailand	Challenger	Hard	(Israel) Daniel Cukierman	(Chinese Taipei) Hsieh Cheng-peng (Chinese Taipei) Huang Tsung-hao	6–3, 6–1

== ITF World Tennis Tour finals ==
=== Singles: 3 (3 runner-ups) ===
Result	W–L	Date	Tournament	Tier	Surface	Opponent	Score
Loss	0–1	Mar 2024	M15 Antalya, Turkey	WTT	Clay	(Romania) Filip Cristian Jianu	1–6, 2–6
Loss	0–2	Jun 2025	M25 Klosters, Switzerland	WTT	Clay	(Austria) Sandro Kopp	6–0, 4–6, 4–6
Loss	0–3	Jul 2025	M25+H Bastia-Lucciana, France	WTT	Clay	(Switzerland) Kilian Feldbausch	3–6, 6–3, 4–6

=== Doubles: 4 (4 titles) ===
Finals by surface
Hard (2–0)
Clay (2–0)

Result	W–L	Date	Tournament	Tier	Surface	Partner	Opponents	Score
Win	1–0	Aug 2023	M15 Kottingbrunn, Austria	WTT	Clay	(Czech Republic) Dominik Kellovský	(Slovakia) Miloš Karol (Austria) David Pichler	3–6, 6–3, [10–4]
Win	2–0	Nov 2023	M15 Heraklion, Greece	WTT	Hard	(Austria) Neil Oberleitner	(Cyprus) Sergis Kyratzis (Cyprus) Eleftherios Neos	6–0, 6–3
Win	3–0	Nov 2023	M15 Heraklion, Greece	WTT	Hard	(Austria) Neil Oberleitner	(Greece) Pavlos Tsitsipas (Greece) Petros Tsitsipas	7–6^{(7–4)}, 6–2
Win	4–0	Mar 2024	M15 Antalya, Turkey	WTT	Clay	(Czech Republic) Jan Hrazdil	(Turkey) Mert Alkaya (Turkey) S Mert Özdemir	6–1, 6–0

== Junior Grand Slam finals ==
=== Doubles: 2 (1 title, 1 runner-up) ===
Result	Year	Tournament	Surface	Partner	Opponents	Score
Loss	2023	US Open	Hard	(Italy) Federico Bondioli	(Sweden) Max Dahlin (Estonia) Oliver Ojakäär	6–3, 3–6, [9–11]
Win	2024	French Open	Clay	(Norway) Nicolai Budkov Kjær	(Italy) Federico Cinà (Japan) Rei Sakamoto	6–4, 7–6^{(7–3)}
