= Neil Oberleitner =

Austrian tennis player

- Country (sports): Austria
- Residence: Vienna, Austria
- Born: 5 August 1999 (age 27) Vienna, Austria
- Height: 1.91 m (6 ft 3 in)
- Plays: Right-handed (two-handed backhand)
- Coach: Alexander Peya
- Prize money: US $848,796

Singles
- Career record: 0–0
- Career titles: 0
- Highest ranking: No. 384 (5 May 2025)
- Current ranking: No. 935 (9 November 2026)

Doubles
- Career record: 33–22
- Career titles: 3
- Highest ranking: No. 13 (9 November 2026)
- Current ranking: No. 13 (9 November 2026)

Grand Slam doubles results
- Australian Open: 2R (2026)
- French Open: QF (2026)
- Wimbledon: 3R (2026)
- US Open: 2R (2026)
- Last updated on: 9 November 2026.

Neil Oberleitner (born 5 August 1999) is an Austrian professional tennis player who specializes in doubles. He has a career-high ATP doubles ranking of world No. 13 achieved on 9 November 2026 and a singles ranking of No. 384 achieved on 5 May 2025. Oberleitner has won 15 doubles Challenger titles, including eight titles in 2025, tied for the most titles for that season.

== Career ==
=== 2021-24: ATP debut ===
Oberleitner made his ATP main draw debut at the 2021 Generali Open Kitzbühel after receiving a wildcard for the doubles main draw, partnering with compatriot Tristan-Samuel Weissborn.

=== 2025-26: Record 8 Challenger titles, First ATP final, top 60 ===
Oberleitner and Joel Schwärzler reached the doubles final of the 2025 Generali Open Kitzbühel, but lost to Petr Nouza and Patrik Rikl. It was the first ATP Tour final for both players.

Oberleitner made his top 60 debut in the ATP doubles rankings on 4 May 2026.

== ATP Tour finals ==
=== Doubles: 5 (3 titles, 2 runner-up) ===
Legend Grand Slam (0–0) ATP 1000 (1–0) ATP 500 (1–0) ATP 250 (1–2)	Finals by surface Hard (3–1) Clay (0–1) Grass (0–0)	Finals by setting Outdoor (2–1) Indoor (1–1)

Result	W–L	Date	Tournament	Tier	Surface	Partner	Opponents	Score
Loss	0–1	Jul 2025	Kitzbühel Open, Austria	ATP 250	Clay	(Austria) Joel Schwärzler	(Czech Republic) Petr Nouza (Czech Republic) Patrik Rikl	6–1, 6–7^{(3–7)}, [5–10]
Win	1–1	Aug 2026	Winston-Salem Open, United States	ATP 250	Hard	(Czech Republic) Petr Nouza	(United States) Austin Krajicek (Croatia) Nikola Mektić	7–5, 6–4
Win	2–1	Oct 2026	Shanghai Masters, China	ATP 1000	Hard	(Austria) Lucas Miedler	(Portugal) Francisco Cabral (United States) JJ Tracy	6–3, 6–4
Loss	2–2	Oct 2026	Almaty Open, Kazakhstan	ATP 250	Hard (i)	(Austria) Lucas Miedler	(India) Yuki Bhambri (United States) Ryan Seggerman	6–7^{(3–7)}, 7–6^{(7–1)}, [2–10]
Win	3–2	Oct 2026	Vienna Open, Austria	ATP 500	Hard (i)	(Austria) Lucas Miedler	(United States) Ryan Seggerman (United States) Learner Tien	6–1, 7–5

== ATP Challenger and ITF Tour finals ==
=== Singles: 7 (3 titles, 4 runner-ups) ===
Legend ATP Challenger Tour (0–0) ITF WTT (3–4)	Finals by surface Hard (0–1) Clay (2–3) Grass (0–0) Carpet (1–0)

Result	W–L	Date	Tournament	Tier	Surface	Opponent	Score
Win	1–0	Jan 2023	M25 Veigy-Foncenex, France	World Tour	Carpet (i)	(Germany) Matthias Bachinger	6–4, 6–2
Win	2–0	May 2023	M15 Osijek, Croatia	World Tour	Clay	(Egypt) Mohamed Safwat	6–4, 6–3
Loss	2–1	Apr 2024	M15 Dubrovnik, Croatia	World Tour	Clay	(France) Maxime Chazal	2–6, 4–6
Win	3–1	Aug 2024	M15 Ollersbach, Austria	World Tour	Clay	(Czech Republic) Jakub Nicod	6–7^{(5–7)}, 7–6^{(10–8)}, 1–0 ret.
Loss	3–2	Oct 2024	M15 Szabolcsveresmart, Hungary	World Tour	Hard	(Hungary) Peter Fajta	6–7^{(5–7)}, 3–6
Los	3–3	Jun 2024	M15 Nyíregyháza, Hungary	World Tour	Clay	(Hungary) Peter Fajta	3–6, 4–6
Los	3–4	Aug 2025	M15 Vienna, Austria	World Tour	Clay	(Croatia) Josip Šimundža	4–6, 6–2, 5–7

=== Doubles: 58 (44 titles, 14 runner-ups) ===
Legend ATP Challenger Tour (16–5) ITF WTT (28–9)	Finals by surface Hard (25–7) Clay (19–7)

Result	W–L	Date	Tournament	Tier	Surface	Partner	Opponents	Score
Loss	0–1	Jun 2019	M15 Balatonalmádi, Hungary	World Tour	Clay	(Austria) Lenny Hampel	(Brazil) Matheus Pucinelli de Almeida (Brazil) João Lucas Reis da Silva	4–6, 6–7^{(1–7)}
Win	1–1	Nov 2019	M15 Heraklion, Greece	World Tour	Hard	(Austria) Alexander Erler	(United Kingdom) Luke Johnson (Poland) Jan Zieliński	6–4, 6–0
Loss	1–2	Aug 2020	M15 Anif, Austria	World Tour	Clay	(Austria) Lucas Miedler	(Germany) Fabian Fallert (Germany) Peter Heller	6–7^{(3–7)}, 7–5, [9–11]
Win	2–2	Sep 2020	M25 Klosters, Switzerland	World Tour	Clay	(Germany) Patrick Zahraj	(Switzerland) Jakub Paul (Switzerland) Damien Wenger	6–3, 6–7^{(5–7)}, [10–6]
Win	3–2	Nov 2020	M15 Heraklion, Greece	World Tour	Hard	(Austria) Lucas Miedler	(Netherlands) Gijs Brouwer (Netherlands) Mick Veldheer	6–4, 6–2
Loss	3–3	Nov 2020	M15 Heraklion, Greece	World Tour	Hard	(Austria) Lucas Miedler	(Germany) Timo Stodder (Germany) Robert Strombachs	4–6, 4–6
Win	4–3	Mar 2021	M15 Bratislava, Slovakia	World Tour	Hard	(Poland) Michał Mikuła	(Poland) Michał Dembek (Ukraine) Vitaliy Sachko	6–7^{(2–7)}, 6–3, [10–5]
Win	5–3	Mar 2021	M15 Sharm El Sheikh, Egypt	World Tour	Hard	(Italy) Jacopo Berrettini	(Japan) Takuto Niki (Japan) Yusuke Takahashi	6–3, 6–3
Win	6–3	Mar 2021	M15 Sharm El Sheikh, Egypt	World Tour	Hard	(Netherlands) Ryan Nijboer	(Ukraine) Marat Deviatiarov (Ukraine) Volodymyr Uzhylovskyi	6–0, 5–7, [10–6]
Loss	6–4	Apr 2021	M15 Sharm El Sheikh, Egypt	World Tour	Hard	(Netherlands) Ryan Nijboer	(Brazil) Oscar José Gutierrez (China) Li Hanwen	Walkover
Win	7–4	Apr 2021	M15 Sharm El Sheikh, Egypt	World Tour	Hard	(Netherlands) Ryan Nijboer	(Japan) Makoto Ochi (Japan) Yuta Shimizu	4–6, 7–6^{(7–4)}, [10–6]
Win	8–4	Jul 2021	M25 Velenje, Slovenia	World Tour	Clay	(Austria) David Pichler	(Croatia) Duje Kekez (Croatia) Frane Ninčević	6–4, 7–6^{(7–1)}
Win	9–4	Jul 2021	M25 Telfs, Austria	World Tour	Clay	(Latvia) Mārtiņš Podžus	(Austria) Filip Misolic (Austria) Lukas Neumayer	7–6^{(7–5)}, 2–6, [10–5]
Loss	9–5	Aug 2021	M15 Warmbad-Villach, Austria	World Tour	Clay	(Austria) Lukas Krainer	(Italy) Daniele Capecchi (Italy) Alexander Weis	6–3, 3–6, [6–10]
Win	10–5	Aug 2021	M15 Bad Waltersdorf, Austria	World Tour	Clay	(Austria) Lukas Neumayer	(Croatia) Admir Kalender (Austria) Lukas Krainer	5–7, 6–3, [10–7]
Win	11–5	Sep 2021	M15 Bad Waltersdorf, Austria	World Tour	Clay	(Austria) Lukas Neumayer	(Austria) Lenny Hampel (Austria) David Pichler	1–6, 6–0, [10–5]
Loss	11–6	Oct 2021	M25 Pretoria, South Africa	World Tour	Hard	(Netherlands) Ryan Nijboer	(Australia) Jeremy Beale (Zimbabwe) Benjamin Lock	6–4, 4–6, [7–10]
Loss	11–7	Nov 2021	M15 Sharm El Sheikh, Egypt	World Tour	Hard	(Ukraine) Volodymyr Uzhylovskyi	(United Kingdom) Ben Jones (United Kingdom) Daniel Little	3–6, 2–6
Win	12–7	Jan 2022	M25 Cairo, Egypt	World Tour	Clay	(Chinese Taipei) Hsu Yu-hsiou	(Greece) Markos Kalovelonis (Austria) David Pichler	7–6^{(7–5)}, 6–4
Loss	12–8	Feb 2022	M25 Sharm El Sheikh, Egypt	World Tour	Hard	(Chinese Taipei) Hsu Yu-hsiou	(Russia) Alibek Kachmazov (Kazakhstan) Beibit Zhukayev	6–1, 6–7^{(1–7)}, [5–10]
Win	13–8	Mar 2022	M25 Portimão, Portugal	World Tour	Hard	(Chinese Taipei) Hsu Yu-hsiou	(Austria) Maximilian Neuchrist (Germany) Kai Wehnelt	6–3, 3–6, [10–7]
Win	14–8	Mar 2022	M25 Loulé, Portugal	World Tour	Hard	(Chinese Taipei) Hsu Yu-hsiou	(Portugal) Pedro Araújo (Netherlands) Guy den Ouden	7–5, 7–5
Win	15–8	Mar 2022	M25 Loulé, Portugal	World Tour	Hard	(Chinese Taipei) Hsu Yu-hsiou	(Portugal) Fábio Coelho (Portugal) Gonçalo Falcão	7–5, 4–6, [10–8]
Win	16–8	Apr 2022	M15 Cairo, Egypt	World Tour	Clay	(Germany) Kai Lemstra	(Romania) Cezar Crețu (Ukraine) Volodymyr Uzhylovskyi	7–6^{(10–8)}, 6–4
Win	17–8	Jul 2022	M15 Innsbruck, Austria	World Tour	Clay	(Austria) Sandro Kopp	(Czech Republic) Adam Jurajda (Slovakia) Miloš Karol	6–2, 6–2
Win	18–8	Aug 2022	Liberec, Czech Republic	Challenger	Clay	(Austria) Philipp Oswald	(Czech Republic) Roman Jebavý (Czech Republic) Adam Pavlásek	7–6^{(7–5)}, 6–2
Loss	18–9	Aug 2022	Meerbusch, Germany	Challenger	Clay	(Austria) Philipp Oswald	(Netherlands) David Pel (Poland) Szymon Walków	5–7, 1–6
Win	19–9	Nov 2022	M25 Heraklion, Greece	World Tour	Hard	(Austria) Sandro Kopp	(Bulgaria) Alexander Donski (Germany) Tim Sandkaulen	6–7^{(2–7)}, 6–3, [10–7]
Win	20–9	Nov 2022	M25 Heraklion, Greece	World Tour	Hard	(Germany) Tim Sandkaulen	(Israel) Daniel Cukierman (Ukraine) Volodymyr Uzhylovskyi	6–2, 7–6^{(7–5)}
Win	21–9	Dec 2022	M25 Monastir, Tunisia	World Tour	Hard	(France) Arthur Bouquier	(Chinese Taipei) Ray Ho (China) Bu Yunchaokete	6–1, 6–4
Win	22–9	Dec 2022	M15 Monastir, Tunisia	World Tour	Hard	Bogdan Bobrov	(Italy) Gabriele Maria Noce (Italy) Stefano Battaglino	7–6^{(7–4)}, 6–1
Loss	22–10	Feb 2023	M25 Monastir, Tunisia	World Tour	Hard	(Ukraine) Oleksandr Ovcharenko	Erik Arutiunian; Daniil Ostapenkov	1–6, 7–6^{(7–3)}, [6–10]
Win	23–10	Apr 2023	M25 Nottingham, Great Britain	World Tour	Hard	(United Kingdom) Marcus Willis	(Denmark) August Holmgren (Denmark) Johannes Ingildsen	7–6^{(7–1)}, 6–3
Loss	23–11	Jun 2023	Bratislava, Slovakia	Challenger	Clay	(Germany) Tim Sandkaulen	(Uruguay) Ariel Behar (Czech Republic) Adam Pavlásek	4–6, 4–6
Win	24–11	Jul 2023	Karlsruhe, Germany	Challenger	Clay	(Germany) Tim Sandkaulen	(Czech Republic) Vít Kopřiva (Greece) Michail Pervolarakis	6–1, 6–1
Loss	24–12	Jul 2023	Liberec, Czech Republic	Challenger	Clay	(Germany) Tim Sandkaulen	(Czech Republic) Petr Nouza (Czech Republic) Andrew Paulson	3–6, 4–6
Win	25–12	Sep 2023	M25 Pazardzhik, Bulgaria	World Tour	Clay	(Austria) Sandro Kopp	(Netherlands) Max Houkes (Ukraine) Eric Vanshelboim	6–0, 6–0
Win	26–12	Nov 2023	M15 Heraklion, Greece	World Tour	Hard	(Austria) Joel Schwärzler	(Cyprus) Sergis Kyratzis (Cyprus) Eleftherios Neos	6–0, 6–3
Win	27–12	Nov 2023	M15 Heraklion, Greece	World Tour	Hard	(Austria) Joel Schwärzler	(Greece) Pavlos Tsitsipas (Greece) Petros Tsitsipas	7–6^{(7–4)}, 6–2
Win	28–12	Feb 2024	M25 Trento, Italy	World Tour	Hard	(Germany) Daniel Masur	(Italy) Giorgio Ricca (Italy) Augusto Virgili	6–2, 6–4
Win	29–12	Mar 2024	M25 Trnava, Slovak Republic	World Tour	Hard	(Switzerland) Jakub Paul	(Czech Republic) David Poljak (Czech Republic) Matěj Vocel	7–5, 6–0
Win	30–12	Apr 2024	M15 Dubrovnik, Croatia	World Tour	Clay	(Germany) Adrian Oetzbach	(Austria) David Pichler (Czech Republic) Michael Vrbenský	7–6^{(7–2)}, 6–3
Win	31–12	Jul 2024	Troyes, France	Challenger	Clay	(Switzerland) Jakub Paul	(Uzbekistan) Denis Istomin; Evgeny Karlovskiy	6–4, 7–6^{(7–1)}
Loss	31–13	Jan 2025	Nonthaburi, Thailand	Challenger	Hard	(Czech Republic) Zdenek Kolar	(Japan) Kokoro Isomura (Japan) Rio Noguchi	6–7 ^{(3–7)}, 6–7 ^{(9–11)}
Win	32–13	Jan 2025	Nonthaburi II, Thailand	Challenger	Hard	(Chinese Taipei) Ray Ho	(United Kingdom) Joshua Paris (Israel) Daniel Cukierman	6–4, 7–6
Win	33–13	Jan 2025	Nonthaburi III, Thailand	Challenger	Hard	(Chinese Taipei) Ray Ho	(China) Wang Aoran (Thailand) Pruchya Isaro	6–3, 6–4
Win	34–13	Mar 2025	Zadar, Croatia	Challenger	Clay	(Czech Republic) Zdenek Kolar	(Ukraine) Denys Molchanov (Netherlands) Mick Veldheer	6–3, 6–4
Win	35–13	Aug 2025	Bonn, Germany	Challenger	Clay	(Netherlands) Mick Veldheer	(Germany) Tim Rühl (Germany) Patrick Zahraj	4–6, 7–6^{(7–3)}, [12–10]
Win	36–13	Sep 2025	Tulln an der Donau, Austria	Challenger	Clay	(Austria) Joel Schwärzler	(Ukraine) Oleg Prihodko (Ukraine) Vitaliy Sachko	5–7, 6–3, [10–7]
Win	37–13	Sep 2025	Târgu Mureș, Romania	Challenger	Clay	(Croatia) Mili Poljičak	(Romania) Alexandru Cristian Dumitru (Romania) Dan Alexandru Tomescu	6–0, 6–3
Win	38–13	Nov 2025	Kobe, Japan	Challenger	Hard	(Czech Republic) Michael Vrbenský	(Thailand) Pruchya Isaro (India) Niki Kaliyanda Poonacha	6–7^{(1–7)}, 7–6^{(10–8)}, [10–4]
Win	39–13	Nov 2025	Yokohama, Japan	Challenger	Hard	(Czech Republic) Michael Vrbenský	(Japan) Masamichi Imamura (Japan) Ryuki Matsuda	7–6^{(8–6)}, 6–1
Win	40–13	Jan 2026	Nonthaburi, Thailand	Challenger	Hard	(India) Sriram Balaji	(India) Anirudh Chandrasekar (Japan) Takeru Yuzuki	6–3, 7–6^{(8–6)}
Win	41–13	Jan 2026	Manama, Bahrain	Challenger	Hard	(India) Sriram Balaji	(United States) Vasil Kirkov (Netherlands) Bart Stevens	7–6^{(7–1)}, 6–4
Win	42–13	Feb 2026	Pau, France	Challenger	Hard (i)	(India) Sriram Balaji	(Switzerland) Jakub Paul (Czech Republic) Matěj Vocel	1–6, 6–3, [13–11]
Win	43–13	Apr 2026	Oeiras, Portugal	Challenger	Clay	(India) Sriram Balaji	(Colombia) Nicolás Barrientos (Uruguay) Ariel Behar	6–7^{(7–9)}, 6–4, [11–9]
Loss	43–14	Apr 2026	Cagliari, Italy	Challenger	Clay	(Czech Republic) Petr Nouza	(Belgium) Sander Gillé (Netherlands) Sem Verbeek	6–4, 3–6, [4–10]
Win	44–14	May 2026	Bordeaux, France	Challenger	Clay	(Czech Republic) Petr Nouza	(France) Arthur Reymond (France) Luca Sanchez	7–6^{(7–3)}, 6–7^{(3–7)}, [10–6]
