= Lukas Neumayer =

Austrian tennis player (born 2002)

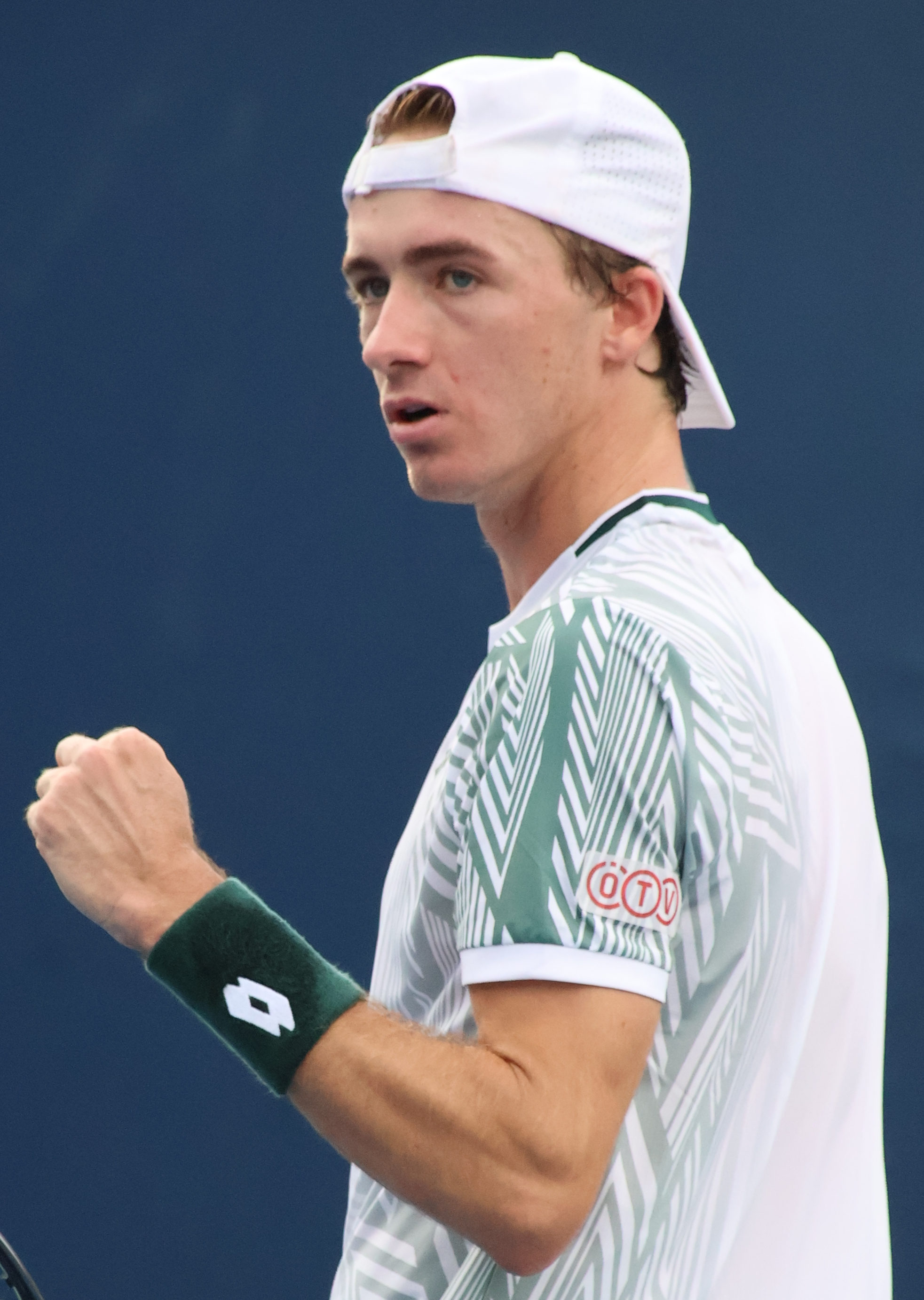
- Neumayer at the 2026 US Open
- Country (sports): Austria
- Residence: Radstadt, Austria
- Born: 6 September 2002 (age 24) Salzburg, Austria
- Height: 1.83 m (6 ft 0 in)
- Turned pro: 2021
- Plays: Right-handed (two-handed backhand)
- Coach: Gerald Kamitz, Günter Bresnik
- Prize money: US $776,138

Singles
- Career record: 5–8 (at ATP Tour level, Grand Slam level, and in Davis Cup)
- Career titles: 2 ATP Challenger
- Highest ranking: No. 152 (9 November 2026)
- Current ranking: No. 152 (9 November 2026)

Grand Slam singles results
- Australian Open: Q2 (2025)
- French Open: Q3 (2026)
- Wimbledon: Q1 (2024, 2025, 2026)
- US Open: Q2 (2026)

Doubles
- Career record: 1–3 (at ATP Tour level, Grand Slam level, and in Davis Cup)
- Career titles: 0
- Highest ranking: No. 492 (18 July 2022)
- Current ranking: No. 671 (9 November 2026)
- Last updated on: 9 November 2026.

Lukas Neumayer (born 6 September 2002) is an Austrian tennis player. He has a career-high ATP singles ranking of world No. 152 achieved on 9 November 2026 and a career-high ATP doubles ranking of No. 492 achieved on 18 July 2022. He is the current No. 4 Austrian player.

== Career ==
Ranked No. 980, Neumayer made his ATP debut at the 2021 Generali Open Kitzbühel after qualifying for the singles main draw.

In February 2022, he won his first Futures Tournament, an M15 in Antalya, defeating Martín Cuevas from Uruguay in the final.

In his seventh final at this level, Neumayer won his first ATP Challenger title at the 2026 Barletta Open, defeating Michele Ribecai in three sets. He won his second Challenger trophy at the 2026 Internazionali di Tennis Città di Vicenza, overcoming Jacopo Vasamì in the final.

== Performance timeline ==
Key
W	F	SF	QF	#R	RR	Q#	DNQ	A	NH

(W) winner; (F) finalist; (SF) semifinalist; (QF) quarterfinalist; (#R) rounds 4, 3, 2, 1; (RR) round-robin stage; (Q#) qualification round; (DNQ) did not qualify; (A) absent; (NH) not held; (SR) strike rate (events won / competed); (W–L) win–loss record.
To avoid confusion and double counting, these charts are updated at the conclusion of a tournament or when the player's participation has ended.

Current through the 2025 Davis Cup.

Tournament	2021	2022	2023	2024	2025	2026	SR	W–L	Win %
Grand Slam tournaments
Australian Open	A	A	A	A	Q2	Q1	0 / 0	0–0	–
French Open	A	A	A	Q1	Q2	Q3	0 / 0	0–0	–
Wimbledon	A	A	A	Q1	Q1		0 / 0	0–0	–
US Open	A	A	A	A	Q1		0 / 0	0–0	–
Win–loss	0–0	0–0	0–0	0–0	0–0	0–0	0 / 0	0–0	–
National representation
Davis Cup	A	A	A	G1			0 / 0	1–0	–
ATP Masters 1000
Indian Wells Masters	A	A	A	A	A		0 / 0	0–0	–
Miami Open	A	A	A	A	A		0 / 0	0–0	–
Monte Carlo Masters	A	A	A	A	A		0 / 0	0–0	–
Madrid Open	A	A	A	A	A		0 / 0	0-0	–
Italian Open	A	A	A	A	A		0 / 0	0–0	–
Canadian Open	A	A	A	A	A		0 / 0	0–0	–
Cincinnati Masters	A	A	A	A	A		0 / 0	0–0	–
Shanghai Masters	NH		A	A	A		0 / 0	0–0	–
Paris Masters	A	A	A	A	A		0 / 0	0–0	–
Win–loss	0–0	0–0	0–0	0–0	0–0	0–0	0 / 0	0–0	–
Career statistics
Tournaments	1	0	0	1	1	3			
Overall win–loss	0–1	0–0	0–0	2–1	2–2	4–4			
Year-end ranking	660	296	236	226					

== ATP Challenger finals ==
=== Singles: 8 (2–6) ===
Finals by surface
Hard (0–0)
Clay (2–6)

Result	W–L	Date	Tournament	Surface	Opponent	Score
Loss	0–1	Jul 2023	Salzburg, Austria	Clay	(Austria) Sebastian Ofner	3–6, 2–6
Loss	0–2	Aug 2023	Cordenons, Italy	Clay	(Italy) Matteo Gigante	0–6, 2–6
Loss	0–3	Sep 2024	NÖ Open Tulln, Austria	Clay	(United Kingdom) Jan Choinski	4–6, 1–6
Loss	0–4	Nov 2024	Montemar, Spain	Clay	(Italy) Fabio Fognini	3–6, 6–2, 3–6
Loss	0–5	May 2025	Vicenza, Italy	Clay	(Chinese Taipei) Tseng Chun-hsin	3–6, 4–6
Loss	0–6	Aug 2025	Cordenons, Italy	Clay	(Serbia) Dušan Lajović	2–6, 6–7^{(3–7)}
Win	1–6	Mar 2026	Barletta, Italy	Clay	(Italy) Michele Ribecai	2–6, 6–3, 6–3
Win	2–6	May 2026	Vicenza, Italy	Clay	(Italy) Jacopo Vasamì	6–2, 6–2

=== Doubles 1 (0–1) ===
Finals by surface
Hard (0–0)
Clay (0–1)

Result	W–L	Date	Tournament	Surface	Partner	Opponents	Score
Loss	0–1	Jan 2024	Buenos Aires, Argentina	Clay	(Netherlands) Max Houkes	(Peru) Arklon Huertas del Pino (Peru) Conner Huertas del Pino	3–6, 6–3, [6–10]

== ITF World Tennis Tour finals ==
=== Singles: 7 (5–2) ===
Finals by surface
Hard (1–0)
Clay (4–2)

Result	W–L	Date	Tournament	Surface	Opponent	Score
Win	1–0	Feb 2022	M15 Antalya, Turkey	Clay	(Uruguay) Martin Cuevas	6–2, 6–2
Win	2–0	Mar 2022	M15 Antalya, Turkey	Clay	(Argentina) Román Andrés Burruchaga	6–4, 1–6, 6–2
Loss	2–1	Jun 2022	M25 Klosters, Switzerland	Clay	(Italy) Mattia Bellucci	3–6, 2–6
Win	3–1	Sep 2022	M25 Madrid, Spain	Hard	(United States) Nicolas Moreno de Alboran	6–4, 6–1
Win	4–1	May 2023	M25 Prague, Czech Republic	Clay	(Germany) Henri Squire	6–2, 6–3
Win	5–1	Jun 2023	M25 Jablonec nad Nisou, Czech Republic	Clay	(Germany) Tim Handel	6–2, 3–6, 6–1
Loss	5–2	Jul 2024	M25 Telfs, Austria	Clay	(Argentina) Facundo Mena	4–6, 2–6
