= 2026 INTARO Open – Doubles =

Doubles
- 2026 INTARO Open

Final
- Champions: (Netherlands) Thijmen Loof (Japan) Kaito Uesugi
- Runners-up: (Serbia) Stefan Latinović (Czech Republic) Michael Vrbenský
- Score: 2–6, 7–6^{(7–0)}, [10–6]

Events
Singles	Doubles
- INTARO Open

Dominik Reček and Daniel Siniakov were the defending champions but chose not to defend their title.

Thijmen Loof and Kaito Uesugi won the title after defeating Stefan Latinović and Michael Vrbenský 2–6, 7–6^{(7–0)}, [10–6] in the final.

== Seeds ==
1. (Colombia) Nicolás Barrientos / (Uruguay) Ariel Behar (semifinals)
2. (Serbia) Stefan Latinović / (Czech Republic) Michael Vrbenský (final)
3. (Romania) Alexandru Jecan / (Romania) Bogdan Pavel (quarterfinals)
4. (Thailand) Pruchya Isaro / (Peru) Alexander Merino (first round)

== Draw ==
Key

- Q = Qualifier
- WC = Wild card
- LL = Lucky loser
- Alt = Alternate
- ITF = ITF entry
- PR = Protected ranking
- SR = Special ranking
- SE = Special exempt
- JE = Junior exempt
- JR = Junior Accelerator Programme entrant
- CO = College Accelerator Programme entrant
- NG = Next Gen Accelerator Program entrant
- w/o = Walkover
- r = Retired
- d = Defaulted

First round
1	(Colombia) N Barrientos (Uruguay) A Behar	7^{7}	6
(Switzerland) L Castelnuovo (Japan) A Santillan	6^{4}	2
(Romania) C Crețu (Romania) Radu Mihai Papoe	6	6
WC	(Moldova) R Albot (Romania) Ștefan Horia Haita	3	4
3	(Romania) A Jecan (Romania) B Pavel	7	6
(Venezuela) Juan José Bianchi (Venezuela) B Pérez	5	4
WC	(Romania) Adrian Constantin (Romania) Sebastian Gima	6^{2}	4
(Netherlands) T Loof (Japan) K Uesugi	7^{7}	6
Alt	(Ecuador) Á Guillén Meza (Colombia) Miguel Tobón	6	6
(Romania) V Cornea (Argentina) F Ribero	0	2
(India) VS Prashanth (India) R Ramanathan	6	4	[10]
4	(Thailand) P Isaro (Peru) A Merino	4	6	[6]
(Spain) M Alcalá Gurri (Spain) M Damas	3	2
(Croatia) D Ajduković (Croatia) A Kalender	6	6
PR	(India) A Kalyanpur (Australia) J Taylor	4	2
2	(Serbia) S Latinović (Czech Republic) M Vrbenský	6	6

Quarterfinals
1	(Colombia) N Barrientos (Uruguay) A Behar	6	6
(Romania) C Crețu (Romania) RM Papoe	4	1
3	(Romania) A Jecan (Romania) B Pavel	6^{4}	2
(Netherlands) T Loof (Japan) K Uesugi	7^{7}	6
Alt	(Ecuador) Á Guillén Meza (Colombia) M Tobón	3	4
(India) VS Prashanth (India) R Ramanathan	6	6
(Croatia) D Ajduković (Croatia) A Kalender	7^{8}	4	[8]
2	(Serbia) S Latinović (Czech Republic) M Vrbenský	6^{6}	6	[10]

Semifinals
1	(Colombia) N Barrientos (Uruguay) A Behar	4	4
(Netherlands) T Loof (Japan) K Uesugi	6	6
(India) VS Prashanth (India) R Ramanathan	1	4
2	(Serbia) S Latinović (Czech Republic) M Vrbenský	6	6

Final
(Netherlands) T Loof (Japan) K Uesugi	2	7^{7}	[10]
2	(Serbia) S Latinović (Czech Republic) M Vrbenský	6	6^{0}	[6]
