= 2026 Schwaben Open =

- Date: 24–29 August
- Edition: 5th
- Location: Augsburg, Germany

Champions

Singles
- (Romania) Cezar Crețu

Doubles
- (Czech Republic) Dominik Reček / (Czech Republic) Daniel Siniakov
- Schwaben Open

The 2026 Schwaben Open was a professional tennis tournament played on clay courts. It was the fifth edition of the tournament which was part of the 2026 ATP Challenger Tour. It took place in Augsburg, Germany between 24 and 29 August 2026.

== Singles main-draw entrants ==
=== Seeds ===
Country	Player	Rank^{1}	Seed
BIH	Andrej Nedić	250	1
CZE	Martin Krumich	255	2
CHI	Matías Soto	262	3
CRO	Mili Poljičak	264	4
ROU	Cezar Crețu	266	5
CZE	Hynek Bartoň	268	6
DOM	Nick Hardt	277	7
AUT	Sandro Kopp	280	8

- ^{1} Rankings are as of 10 August 2026.

=== Other entrants ===
The following players received wildcards into the singles main draw:

- (Germany) Henri Haupt
- (Germany) Daniel Masur
- (Germany) Niels McDonald

The following player received entry into the singles main draw as an alternate:

- (Brazil) Eduardo Ribeiro

The following players received entry from the qualifying draw:

- (Switzerland) Mika Brunold
- Svyatoslav Gulin
- (Lebanon) Benjamin Hassan
- (Ukraine) Oleksii Krutykh
- (Germany) Benito Sanchez Martinez
- (Germany) Kai Wehnelt

== Champions ==
=== Singles ===
- (Romania) Cezar Crețu def. (Argentina) Facundo Mena 6–2, 6–0.

=== Doubles ===
- (Czech Republic) Dominik Reček / (Czech Republic) Daniel Siniakov def. (Argentina) Juan Manuel La Serna / (Brazil) Eduardo Ribeiro 6–2, 6–3.
