= 2025 INTARO Open II – Singles =

Singles
- 2025 INTARO Open II

Final
- Champion: (Italy) Franco Agamenone
- Runner-up: (United Kingdom) Jay Clarke
- Score: 6–3, 6–4

Events
Singles	Doubles
- INTARO Open

Marco Trungelliti was the defending champion but chose not to defend his title.

Franco Agamenone won the title after defeating Jay Clarke 6–3, 6–4 in the final.

== Seeds ==
1. (United Kingdom) Jay Clarke (final)
2. (Spain) Daniel Rincón (quarterfinals)
3. (Bulgaria) Dimitar Kuzmanov (second round)
4. (France) Mathys Erhard (semifinals)
5. (Romania) Filip Cristian Jianu (second round)
6. (Italy) Lorenzo Giustino (first round, retired)
7. (Spain) Nicolás Álvarez Varona (second round)
8. (Switzerland) Mika Brunold (second round)

== Draw ==
Key

- Q = Qualifier
- WC = Wild card
- LL = Lucky loser
- Alt = Alternate
- ITF = ITF entry
- PR = Protected ranking
- SR = Special ranking
- SE = Special exempt
- JE = Junior exempt
- JR = Junior Accelerator Programme entrant
- CO = College Accelerator Programme entrant
- NG = Next Gen Accelerator Program entrant
- w/o = Walkover
- r = Retired
- d = Defaulted

=== Finals ===
Semifinals
1	(United Kingdom) Jay Clarke	6	6
(Spain) Miguel Damas	3	0
4	(France) Mathys Erhard	0	2
(Italy) Franco Agamenone	6	6

Final
1	(United Kingdom) Jay Clarke	3	4
(Italy) Franco Agamenone	6	6

=== Top half ===
First round
1	(United Kingdom) J Clarke	6	6
(Ukraine) O Ovcharenko	0	4
Q	(Romania) Daniel Uta	1	1
Q	(France) Amaury Raynel	6	6
WC	(Romania) Cezar Stefan Bentzel	0	3
(Romania) GA Boitan	6	6
(Uruguay) F Roncadelli	4	4
7	(Spain) N Álvarez Varona	6	6
3	(Bulgaria) D Kuzmanov	7^{7}	4	6
(Spain) I Montes de la Torre	6^{3}	6	1
Q	(Romania) Dan Alexandru Tomescu	2	3
(Italy) Andrea Picchione	6	6
(Netherlands) Ryan Nijboer	3	2
(Spain) M Damas	6	6
(Spain) Àlex Martí Pujolràs	4	4
8	(Switzerland) M Brunold	6	6

Second round
1	(United Kingdom) J Clarke	6	6
Q	(France) A Raynel	2	4
(Romania) GA Boitan	6^{2}	6	6
7	(Spain) N Álvarez Varona	7^{7}	3	4
3	(Bulgaria) D Kuzmanov	6^{4}	7^{7}	6^{2}
(Italy) A Picchione	7^{7}	6^{3}	7^{7}
(Spain) M Damas	6	6
8	(Switzerland) M Brunold	3	1

Quarterfinals
1	(United Kingdom) J Clarke	6	7
(Romania) GA Boitan	0	5
(Italy) A Picchione	3	2^{r}
(Spain) M Damas	6	3

Semifinals
1	(United Kingdom) J Clarke	6	6
(Spain) M Damas	3	0

=== Bottom half ===
First round
6	(Italy) L Giustino	6^{2}	1^{r}
(Spain) M Alcalá Gurri	7^{7}	2
(France) C Denolly	6^{2}	7^{7}	6
Q	(South Korea) G Campaña Lee	7^{7}	6^{4}	2
WC	(Romania) Mihai Alexandru Coman	2	2
WC	(Romania) Sebastian Gima	6	6
(Czech Republic) M Mrva	6^{6}	5
4	(France) Mathys Erhard	7^{8}	7
5	(Romania) FC Jianu	6	6^{2}	6
(Austria) M Neuchrist	2	7^{7}	3
Q	(France) T Faurel	1	3
(Italy) F Agamenone	6	6
(Spain) B Zapata Miralles	4	6	3
Q	(Belgium) Jack Logé	6	3	6
(Romania) ND Ionel	0	2
2	(Spain) D Rincón	6	6

Second round
(Spain) M Alcalá Gurri	3	6	6^{5}
(France) C Denolly	6	3	7^{7}
WC	(Romania) S Gima	3	4
4	(France) M Erhard	6	6
5	(Romania) FC Jianu	4	3
(Italy) F Agamenone	6	6
Q	(Belgium) J Logé	6	1	2
2	(Spain) D Rincón	1	6	6

Quarterfinals
(France) C Denolly	0	3
4	(France) M Erhard	6	6
(Italy) F Agamenone	6	7
2	(Spain) D Rincón	2	5

Semifinals
4	(France) M Erhard	0	2
(Italy) F Agamenone	6	6
