= 2025 INTARO Open – Singles =

Singles
- 2025 INTARO Open

Final
- Champion: (Argentina) Marco Trungelliti
- Runner-up: (Croatia) Mili Poljičak
- Score: 6–1, 0–0 ret.

Events
Singles	Doubles
- INTARO Open

This was the first edition of the tournament.

Marco Trungelliti won the title after Mili Poljičak retired while trailing 1–6, 0–0 in the final.

== Seeds ==
1. (Argentina) Marco Trungelliti (champion)
2. (United Kingdom) Jay Clarke (semifinals)
3. (Romania) Filip Cristian Jianu (semifinals)
4. (Spain) Nicolás Álvarez Varona (first round, retired)
5. (France) Mathys Erhard (first round)
6. (Spain) Daniel Rincón (second round)
7. (Croatia) Mili Poljičak (final, retired)
8. (France) Corentin Denolly (second round)

== Draw ==
Key

- Q = Qualifier
- WC = Wild card
- LL = Lucky loser
- Alt = Alternate
- ITF = ITF entry
- PR = Protected ranking
- SR = Special ranking
- SE = Special exempt
- JE = Junior exempt
- JR = Junior Accelerator Programme entrant
- CO = College Accelerator Programme entrant
- NG = Next Gen Accelerator Program entrant
- w/o = Walkover
- r = Retired
- d = Defaulted

=== Finals ===
Semifinals
1	(Argentina) Marco Trungelliti	6	6
3	(Romania) Filip Cristian Jianu	4	4
7	(Croatia) Mili Poljičak	6	7
2	(United Kingdom) Jay Clarke	3	5

Final
1	(Argentina) Marco Trungelliti	6	0
7	(Croatia) Mili Poljičak	1	0^{r}

=== Top half ===
First round
1	(Argentina) M Trungelliti	6	6
(Spain) B Zapata Miralles	4	3
(Switzerland) M Brunold	7^{7}	6
(Canada) D Martin	6^{3}	3
(Italy) F Agamenone	6	7^{7}
(Spain) M Alcalá Gurri	2	6^{5}
Q	(Spain) Imanol López Morillo	2	3
6	(Spain) D Rincón	6	6
3	(Romania) FC Jianu	6	6
(Italy) Tommaso Compagnucci	2	1
(Spain) M Damas	6	6^{4}	4
(Austria) M Neuchrist	4	7^{7}	6
(Spain) Àlex Martí Pujolràs	6	6
(Austria) N Oberleitner	2	4
Q	(Romania) Ștefan Paloși	7^{7}	6
5	(France) Mathys Erhard	6^{5}	4

Second round
1	(Argentina) M Trungelliti	7^{7}	6
(Switzerland) M Brunold	6^{5}	4
(Italy) F Agamenone	6	6^{5}	6
6	(Spain) D Rincón	4	7^{7}	3
3	(Romania) FC Jianu	6	6
(Austria) M Neuchrist	3	2
(Spain) À Martí Pujolràs	3	3
Q	(Romania) Ș Paloși	6	6

Quarterfinals
1	(Argentina) M Trungelliti	6	4	6
(Italy) F Agamenone	4	6	4
3	(Romania) FC Jianu	6	2	6
Q	(Romania) Ș Paloși	4	6	3

Semifinals
1	(Argentina) M Trungelliti	6	6
3	(Romania) FC Jianu	4	4

=== Bottom half ===
First round
7	(Croatia) M Poljičak	4	6	6
(Romania) ND Ionel	6	3	4
(Romania) GA Boitan	6	6
WC	(Romania) Dan Alexandru Tomescu	3	1
WC	(Romania) Mihai Alexandru Coman	3	2
Q	(Romania) C Crețu	6	6
Q	(Belgium) Émilien Demanet	6	3
4	(Spain) N Álvarez Varona	3	0^{r}
8	(France) C Denolly	6	6
Q	(Romania) Ștefan Adrian Andreescu	2	2
WC	(Romania) Sebastian Gima	3	4
(Italy) Andrea Picchione	6	6
Q	(Romania) Radu Mihai Papoe	6	7^{8}
(South Korea) G Campaña Lee	4	6^{6}
(Netherlands) Ryan Nijboer	3	2
2	(United Kingdom) J Clarke	6	6

Second round
7	(Croatia) M Poljičak	6^{4}	6	6
(Romania) GA Boitan	7^{7}	2	1
Q	(Romania) C Crețu	3	6	6
Q	(Belgium) É Demanet	6	2	4
8	(France) C Denolly	4	0
(Italy) A Picchione	6	6
Q	(Romania) RM Papoe	6	3	4
2	(United Kingdom) J Clarke	3	6	6

Quarterfinals
7	(Croatia) M Poljičak	6	6
Q	(Romania) C Crețu	3	2
(Italy) A Picchione	4	6	5
2	(United Kingdom) J Clarke	6	3	7

Semifinals
7	(Croatia) M Poljičak	6	7
2	(United Kingdom) J Clarke	3	5
