= 2026 INTARO Open – Singles =

Singles
- 2026 INTARO Open

Final
- Champion: (India) Sumit Nagal
- Runner-up: (France) Felix Balshaw
- Score: 6–3, 7–5

Events
Singles	Doubles
- INTARO Open

Franco Agamenone was the defending champion but lost in the second round to Duje Ajduković.

Sumit Nagal won the title after defeating Felix Balshaw 6–3, 7–5 in the final.

== Seeds ==
1. (Denmark) Elmer Møller (second round, retired)
2. (Italy) Francesco Passaro (second round)
3. (Bosnia and Herzegovina) Andrej Nedić (semifinals)
4. (Italy) Franco Agamenone (second round)
5. (Ecuador) Álvaro Guillén Meza (second round)
6. (Czech Republic) Martin Krumich (quarterfinals)
7. (Spain) Miguel Damas (first round)
8. (Spain) Max Alcalá Gurri (quarterfinals)

== Draw ==
Key

- Q = Qualifier
- WC = Wild card
- LL = Lucky loser
- Alt = Alternate
- ITF = ITF entry
- PR = Protected ranking
- SR = Special ranking
- SE = Special exempt
- JE = Junior exempt
- JR = Junior Accelerator Programme entrant
- CO = College Accelerator Programme entrant
- NG = Next Gen Accelerator Program entrant
- w/o = Walkover
- r = Retired
- d = Defaulted

=== Finals ===
Semifinals
Q	(France) Felix Balshaw	7^{7}	7
3	(Bosnia and Herzegovina) Andrej Nedić	6^{5}	5
(India) Sumit Nagal	6	4	6
Alt	(Romania) Cezar Crețu	3	6	1

Final
Q	(France) Felix Balshaw	3	5
(India) Sumit Nagal	6	7

=== Top half ===
First round
1	(Denmark) E Møller	6	7
Q	(Italy) Luca Potenza	4	5
Q	(France) F Balshaw	6	6
WC	(Romania) Ștefan Horia Haita	2	0
I Simakin	4	6	2
(Germany) M Topo	6	4	6
NG	(Colombia) Miguel Tobón	4	6	4
6	(Czech Republic) M Krumich	6	4	6
3	(Bosnia and Herzegovina) A Nedić	6	6
Q	(Mexico) AF Rubio Fierros	1	2
LL	(Romania) Sebastian Gima	7^{7}	6
Q	(Kazakhstan) D Yevseyev	6^{4}	3
(France) S Gueymard Wayenburg	7	6
WC	(Romania) Gabriel Ghețu	5	1
(Uzbekistan) S Fomin	6^{6}	1
8	(Spain) M Alcalá Gurri	7^{8}	6

Second round
1	(Denmark) E Møller	1	0^{r}
Q	(France) F Balshaw	6	3
(Germany) M Topo	4	2
6	(Czech Republic) M Krumich	6	6
3	(Bosnia and Herzegovina) A Nedić	6^{4}	6	7
LL	(Romania) S Gima	7^{7}	3	5
(France) S Gueymard Wayenburg	2	5
8	(Spain) M Alcalá Gurri	6	7

Quarterfinals
Q	(France) F Balshaw	6	3	6
6	(Czech Republic) M Krumich	3	6	3
3	(Bosnia and Herzegovina) A Nedić	6	6
8	(Spain) M Alcalá Gurri	2	4

Semifinals
Q	(France) F Balshaw	7^{7}	7
3	(Bosnia and Herzegovina) A Nedić	6^{5}	5

=== Bottom half ===
First round
7	(Spain) M Damas	2	6	6^{3}
(Lebanon) B Hassan	6	3	7^{7}
Alt	(Croatia) M Poljičak	4	6	5
(India) S Nagal	6	3	7
WC	(Moldova) R Albot	6	6^{3}	6^{11}
(Croatia) D Ajduković	3	7^{7}	7^{13}
(Switzerland) L Castelnuovo	3	6	5
4	(Italy) F Agamenone	6	3	7
5	(Ecuador) Á Guillén Meza	7^{7}	7
Q	(Romania) Radu Mihai Papoe	6^{4}	5
Alt	(Romania) C Crețu	6	6
(Japan) A Santillan	4	3
(Italy) M Ribecai	5	7^{7}	1
JR	(Germany) N McDonald	7	6^{5}	6
Q	(Spain) O Roca Batalla	6^{2}	4
2	(Italy) F Passaro	7^{7}	6

Second round
(Lebanon) B Hassan	6	4	4
(India) S Nagal	1	6	6
(Croatia) D Ajduković	7	7
4	(Italy) F Agamenone	5	5
5	(Ecuador) Á Guillén Meza	2	3
Alt	(Romania) C Crețu	6	6
JR	(Germany) N McDonald	6^{5}	6	6
2	(Italy) F Passaro	7^{7}	3	4

Quarterfinals
(India) S Nagal	3	7	6
(Croatia) D Ajduković	6	5	4
Alt	(Romania) C Crețu	6	6
JR	(Germany) N McDonald	3	4

Semifinals
(India) S Nagal	6	4	6
Alt	(Romania) C Crețu	3	6	1
