= 2026 Florence Challenger – Singles =

Singles
- 2026 Florence Challenger

Final
- Champion: (Italy) Filippo Romano
- Runner-up: (Italy) Michele Ribecai
- Score: 6–3, 4–6, 6–2

Events
Singles	Doubles
- Florence Challenger

This was the first edition of the tournament.

Filippo Romano won the title after defeating Michele Ribecai 6–3, 4–6, 6–2 in the final.

== Seeds ==
1. (Czech Republic) Zdeněk Kolář (first round)
2. (Italy) Lorenzo Giustino (first round)
3. (Italy) Gianluca Cadenasso (first round)
4. (United Kingdom) Felix Gill (first round)
5. (Netherlands) Max Houkes (second round)
6. (United Kingdom) Henry Searle (second round)
7. (United Kingdom) Jay Clarke (first round)
8. (Bosnia and Herzegovina) Andrej Nedić (second round)

== Draw ==
Key

- Q = Qualifier
- WC = Wild card
- LL = Lucky loser
- Alt = Alternate
- ITF = ITF entry
- PR = Protected ranking
- SR = Special ranking
- SE = Special exempt
- JE = Junior exempt
- JR = Junior Accelerator Programme entrant
- CO = College Accelerator Programme entrant
- NG = Next Gen Accelerator Program entrant
- w/o = Walkover
- r = Retired
- d = Defaulted

=== Finals ===
Semifinals
(Spain) Oriol Roca Batalla	5	4
(Italy) Michele Ribecai	7	6
(Austria) Sandro Kopp	3	7	3
(Italy) Filippo Romano	6	5	6

Final
(Italy) Michele Ribecai	3	6	2
(Italy) Filippo Romano	6	4	6

=== Top half ===
First round
1	(Czech Republic) Z Kolář	6	3	2
(Italy) F Bondioli	4	6	6
(Italy) F Forti	6	7^{7}
(Czech Republic) J Forejtek	2	6^{3}
(Romania) Radu Mihai Papoe	4	1
(Spain) O Roca Batalla	6	6
Q	(Greece) D Sakellaridis	7	4	6
7	(United Kingdom) J Clarke	5	6	2
4	(United Kingdom) F Gill	6^{5}	1
Q	(Austria) F Misolic	7^{7}	6
JR	(Bulgaria) I Ivanov	3	0^{r}
LL	(Spain) Izan Almazán Valiente	6	3
(Italy) M Ribecai	4	6	4
NG	(Italy) J Vasamì	6	0	2^{r}
Alt	(Italy) F Agamenone	6^{5}	7	1
5	(Netherlands) M Houkes	7^{7}	5	6

Second round
(Italy) F Bondioli	1	0
(Italy) F Forti	6	6
(Spain) O Roca Batalla	6	6
Q	(Greece) D Sakellaridis	1	4
Q	(Austria) F Misolic	4	6	6
LL	(Spain) I Almazán Valiente	6	3	3
(Italy) M Ribecai	3	6	6
5	(Netherlands) M Houkes	6	3	0

Quarterfinals
(Italy) F Forti	2	7^{7}	0
(Spain) O Roca Batalla	6	6^{4}	6
Q	(Austria) F Misolic	2	1
(Italy) M Ribecai	6	6

Semifinals
(Spain) O Roca Batalla	5	4
(Italy) M Ribecai	7	6

=== Bottom half ===
First round
8	(Bosnia and Herzegovina) A Nedić	6	6
WC	(Italy) G Piraino	2	2
Q	(Spain) Àlex Martí Pujolràs	6	1	6
Q	(Italy) Pierluigi Basile	4	6	3
(Spain) M Damas	4	6	2
WC	(Italy) S Pieri	6	3	6
(Austria) S Kopp	7^{7}	6
3	(Italy) G Cadenasso	6^{2}	1
6	(United Kingdom) H Searle	6	7^{9}
WC	(Italy) Massimo Giunta	2	6^{7}
Q	(Czech Republic) Matthew William Donald	6	5	6
(Spain) C Sánchez Jover	4	7	3
(Italy) F Romano	6	6
(Romania) FC Jianu	3	2
Q	(Bulgaria) Y Milev	6	6^{3}	6
2	(Italy) L Giustino	1	7^{7}	3

Second round
8	(Bosnia and Herzegovina) A Nedić	1	2
Q	(Spain) À Martí Pujolràs	6	6
WC	(Italy) S Pieri	6	3	4
(Austria) S Kopp	4	6	6
6	(United Kingdom) H Searle	4	6^{16}
Q	(Czech Republic) MW Donald	6	7^{18}
(Italy) F Romano	6	6
Q	(Bulgaria) Y Milev	3	3

Quarterfinals
Q	(Spain) À Martí Pujolràs	3	2
(Austria) S Kopp	6	6
Q	(Czech Republic) MW Donald	3	2
(Italy) F Romano	6	6

Semifinals
(Austria) S Kopp	3	7	3
(Italy) F Romano	6	5	6
