= 2025 INTARO Open – Doubles =

Doubles
- 2025 INTARO Open

Final
- Champions: (Austria) Neil Oberleitner (Croatia) Mili Poljičak
- Runners-up: (Romania) Alexandru Cristian Dumitru (Romania) Dan Alexandru Tomescu
- Score: 6–0, 6–3

Events
Singles	Doubles
- INTARO Open

This was the first edition of the tournament.

Neil Oberleitner and Mili Poljičak won the title after defeating Alexandru Cristian Dumitru and Dan Alexandru Tomescu 6–0, 6–3 in the final.

== Seeds ==
1. (Austria) Neil Oberleitner / (Croatia) Mili Poljičak (champions)
2. (Czech Republic) Jan Jermář / (Czech Republic) David Poljak (first round)
3. (Netherlands) Ryan Nijboer / (Spain) Daniel Rincón (quarterfinals)
4. (United Kingdom) Jay Clarke / (France) Corentin Denolly (semifinals)

== Draw ==
Key

- Q = Qualifier
- WC = Wild card
- LL = Lucky loser
- Alt = Alternate
- ITF = ITF entry
- PR = Protected ranking
- SR = Special ranking
- SE = Special exempt
- JE = Junior exempt
- JR = Junior Accelerator Programme entrant
- CO = College Accelerator Programme entrant
- NG = Next Gen Accelerator Program entrant
- w/o = Walkover
- r = Retired
- d = Defaulted

=== Draw ===
First round
1	(Austria) N Oberleitner (Croatia) M Poljičak	6	3	[10]
(Romania) GA Boitan (Romania) FC Jianu	1	6	[6]
(Romania) ND Ionel (Romania) Radu Mihai Papoe	1	1
(Italy) F Agamenone (Italy) Lorenzo Lorusso	6	6
3	(Netherlands) Ryan Nijboer (Spain) D Rincón	6	6
(Italy) Tommaso Compagnucci (Italy) Andrea Picchione	4	4
(Romania) Dragoș Nicolae Cazacu (Austria) M Neuchrist	7	6
(Spain) M Alcalá Gurri (Spain) Àlex Martí Pujolràs	5	3
Alt	(Canada) Benjamin Thomas George (Ghana) I Nortey	3	7^{7}	[9]
(Canada) D Martin (Ukraine) N Mashtakov	6	6^{3}	[11]
WC	(Romania) C Crețu (Romania) Daniel Uta	6^{1}	6^{4}
4	(United Kingdom) J Clarke (France) C Denolly	7^{7}	7^{7}
WC	(Romania) Mihai Alexandru Coman (Romania) Sebastian Gima	7^{7}	4	[8]
(Romania) Alexandru Cristian Dumitru (Romania) Dan Alexandru Tomescu	6^{3}	6	[10]
(Spain) M Damas (France) Mathys Erhard	6	3	[11]
2	(Czech Republic) J Jermář (Czech Republic) D Poljak	3	6	[9]

Quarterfinals
1	(Austria) N Oberleitner (Croatia) M Poljičak	7^{9}	6
(Italy) F Agamenone (Italy) L Lorusso	6^{7}	1
3	(Netherlands) R Nijboer (Spain) D Rincón	6^{6}	7^{7}	[6]
(Romania) DN Cazacu (Austria) M Neuchrist	7^{8}	6^{4}	[10]
(Canada) D Martin (Ukraine) N Mashtakov	1	4
4	(United Kingdom) J Clarke (France) C Denolly	6	6
(Romania) AC Dumitru (Romania) DA Tomescu	6	6
(Spain) M Damas (France) M Erhard	3	2

Semifinals
1	(Austria) N Oberleitner (Croatia) M Poljičak	6	7
(Romania) DN Cazacu (Austria) M Neuchrist	4	5
4	(United Kingdom) J Clarke (France) C Denolly	2	6	[5]
(Romania) AC Dumitru (Romania) DA Tomescu	6	3	[10]

Final
1	(Austria) N Oberleitner (Croatia) M Poljičak	6	6
(Romania) AC Dumitru (Romania) DA Tomescu	0	3
