= 2026 INTARO Open =

- Date: 22–27 June
- Edition: 3rd
- Surface: Clay
- Location: Târgu Mureș, Romania

Champions

Singles
- (India) Sumit Nagal

Doubles
- (Netherlands) Thijmen Loof / (Japan) Kaito Uesugi
- INTARO Open

The 2026 INTARO Open was a professional tennis tournament played on clay courts. It was the third edition of the tournament which was part of the 2026 ATP Challenger Tour. It took place in Târgu Mureș, Romania between 22 and 27 June 2026.

== Singles main-draw entrants ==
=== Seeds ===
Country	Player	Rank^{1}	Seed
DEN	Elmer Møller	151	1
ITA	Francesco Passaro	178	2
BIH	Andrej Nedić	255	3
ITA	Franco Agamenone	264	4
ECU	Álvaro Guillén Meza	266	5
CZE	Martin Krumich	268	6
ESP	Miguel Damas	269	7
ESP	Max Alcalá Gurri	272	8

^{1} Rankings are as of 15 June 2026.

=== Other entrants ===
The following players received wildcards into the singles main draw:

- (Moldova) Radu Albot
- (Romania) Gabriel Ghețu
- (Romania) Ștefan Horia Haita

The following player received entry into the singles main draw through the Junior Accelerator programme:

- (Germany) Niels McDonald

The following player received entry into the singles main draw through the Next Gen Accelerator programme:

- (Colombia) Miguel Tobón

The following players received entry into the singles main draw as alternates:

- (Romania) ~~Adrian Boitan~~
- (Romania) Cezar Crețu
- (Croatia) Mili Poljičak

The following players received entry from the qualifying draw:

- (France) Felix Balshaw
- (Romania) Radu Mihai Papoe
- (Italy) Luca Potenza
- (Spain) Oriol Roca Batalla
- (Mexico) Alan Fernando Rubio Fierros
- (Kazakhstan) Denis Yevseyev

The following player received entry as a lucky loser:

- (Romania) Sebastian Gima

== Champions ==
=== Singles ===
- (India) Sumit Nagal def. (France) Felix Balshaw 6–3, 7–5.

=== Doubles ===
- (Netherlands) Thijmen Loof / (Japan) Kaito Uesugi def. (Serbia) Stefan Latinović / (Czech Republic) Michael Vrbenský 2–6, 7–6^{(7–0)}, [10–6].
