= 2026 Florence Challenger – Doubles =

Doubles
- 2026 Florence Challenger

Final
- Champions: (Netherlands) Mats Hermans (Netherlands) Max Houkes
- Runners-up: (Italy) Jacopo Bilardo (Italy) Giorgio Ricca
- Score: 7–5, 4–6, [10–8]

Events
Singles	Doubles
- Florence Challenger

This was the first edition of the tournament.

Mats Hermans and Max Houkes won the title after defeating Jacopo Bilardo and Giorgio Ricca 7–5, 4–6, [10–8] in the final.

== Seeds ==
1. (Italy) Francesco Forti / (Italy) Filippo Romano (semifinals)
2. (Czech Republic) Dominik Reček / (Czech Republic) Daniel Siniakov (quarterfinals)
3. (Netherlands) Mats Hermans / (Netherlands) Max Houkes (champions)
4. (Italy) Jacopo Bilardo / (Italy) Giorgio Ricca (final)

== Draw ==
Key

- Q = Qualifier
- WC = Wild card
- LL = Lucky loser
- Alt = Alternate
- ITF = ITF entry
- PR = Protected ranking
- SR = Special ranking
- SE = Special exempt
- JE = Junior exempt
- JR = Junior Accelerator Programme entrant
- CO = College Accelerator Programme entrant
- NG = Next Gen Accelerator Program entrant
- w/o = Walkover
- r = Retired
- d = Defaulted

First round
1	(Italy) F Forti (Italy) F Romano	6	7
(France) Marko Marić (Serbia) Tadija Radovanović	1	5
3	(Netherlands) M Hermans (Netherlands) M Houkes	3	6	[10]
WC	(Italy) Cosimo Banti (Italy) Matteo Mesaglio	6	0	[5]
(Venezuela) Juan José Bianchi (Czech Republic) Jakub Vrba	6	6
(Italy) Alessio De Bernardis (Italy) J Vasamì	4	2
Alt	(Spain) Axel Herberg Amorós (Spain) Àlex Martí Pujolràs	4^{r}
WC	(Italy) Mattia Nannelli (Italy) Leonardo Rossi	5
(United Kingdom) Matthew Howse (United Kingdom) J MacKinlay	1	4
4	(Italy) Jacopo Bilardo (Italy) G Ricca	6	6
(Italy) Simone Agostini (Italy) Riccardo Perin	7^{7}	4	[10]
(Italy) M Ribecai (Italy) Gabriele Volpi	6^{3}	6	[12]
(Belgium) Nicolas Ifi (Germany) Cedric Stanke	4	5
2	(Czech Republic) D Reček (Czech Republic) D Siniakov	6	7

Quarterfinals
1	(Italy) F Forti (Italy) F Romano	6	6
(Bulgaria) Y Milev (Bulgaria) R Shandarov	2	3
3	(Netherlands) M Hermans (Netherlands) M Houkes	7^{7}	5	[10]
(Venezuela) JJ Bianchi (Czech Republic) J Vrba	6^{4}	7	[0]
WC	(Italy) M Nannelli (Italy) L Rossi	1	4
4	(Italy) J Bilardo (Italy) G Ricca	6	6
(Italy) M Ribecai (Italy) G Volpi	7^{7}	6
2	(Czech Republic) D Reček (Czech Republic) D Siniakov	6^{3}	4

Semifinals
1	(Italy) F Forti (Italy) F Romano	3	4
3	(Netherlands) M Hermans (Netherlands) M Houkes	6	6
4	(Italy) J Bilardo (Italy) G Ricca	7^{7}	6
(Italy) M Ribecai (Italy) G Volpi	6^{3}	3

Final
3	(Netherlands) M Hermans (Netherlands) M Houkes	7	4	[10]
4	(Italy) J Bilardo (Italy) G Ricca	5	6	[8]
