= 2026 Schwaben Open – Singles =

Singles
- 2026 Schwaben Open

Final
- Champion: (Romania) Cezar Crețu
- Runner-up: (Argentina) Facundo Mena
- Score: 6–2, 6–0

Events
Singles	Doubles
- Schwaben Open

Cedrik-Marcel Stebe was the defending champion but chose not to defend his title.

Cezar Crețu won the title after defeating Facundo Mena 6–2, 6–0 in the final.

== Seeds ==
1. (Bosnia and Herzegovina) Andrej Nedić (first round)
2. (Czech Republic) Martin Krumich (quarterfinals)
3. (Chile) Matías Soto (second round)
4. (Croatia) Mili Poljičak (first round)
5. (Romania) Cezar Crețu (champion)
6. (Czech Republic) Hynek Bartoň (quarterfinals)
7. (Dominican Republic) Nick Hardt (first round)
8. (Austria) Sandro Kopp (semifinals)

== Draw ==
Key

- Q = Qualifier
- WC = Wild card
- LL = Lucky loser
- Alt = Alternate
- ITF = ITF entry
- PR = Protected ranking
- SR = Special ranking
- SE = Special exempt
- JE = Junior exempt
- JR = Junior Accelerator Programme entrant
- CO = College Accelerator Programme entrant
- NG = Next Gen Accelerator Program entrant
- w/o = Walkover
- r = Retired
- d = Defaulted

=== Finals ===
Semifinals
Q	(Germany) Benito Sanchez Martinez	6	4	6^{6}
(Argentina) Facundo Mena	4	6	7^{8}
5	(Romania) Cezar Crețu	6	7
8	(Austria) Sandro Kopp	3	5

Final
(Argentina) Facundo Mena	2	0
5	(Romania) Cezar Crețu	6	6

=== Top half ===
First round
1	(Bosnia and Herzegovina) A Nedić	6	4	3
(Argentina) Juan Estévez	2	6	6
Q	(Germany) B Sanchez Martinez	6	6
(Bolivia) M Dellien	2	4
Q	(Lebanon) B Hassan	2	6	5
(Argentina) JM La Serna	6	3	7
(France) C Hemery	5	5
6	(Czech Republic) H Bartoň	7	7
4	(Croatia) M Poljičak	4	3
(Germany) M Schönhaus	6	6
(Czech Republic) Petr Brunclík	4	4
WC	(Germany) D Masur	6	6
(Argentina) F Mena	6	6
(Germany) MH Rehberg	4	4
Q	(Germany) K Wehnelt	2	6	6
7	(Dominican Republic) N Hardt	6	3	2

Second round
(Argentina) J Estévez	3	4
Q	(Germany) B Sanchez Martinez	6	6
(Argentina) JM La Serna	6	5	2
6	(Czech Republic) H Bartoň	1	7	6
(Germany) M Schönhaus	7^{7}	4	4
WC	(Germany) D Masur	6^{0}	6	6
(Argentina) F Mena	7^{7}	7
Q	(Germany) K Wehnelt	6^{4}	5

Quarterfinals
Q	(Germany) B Sanchez Martinez	6	6
6	(Czech Republic) H Bartoň	4	3
WC	(Germany) D Masur	6^{3}	1
(Argentina) F Mena	7^{7}	6

Semifinals
Q	(Germany) B Sanchez Martinez	6	4	6^{6}
(Argentina) F Mena	4	6	7^{8}

=== Bottom half ===
First round
5	(Romania) C Crețu	6	6
WC	(Germany) N McDonald	2	0
(Germany) M Topo	3	4
(Spain) M Damas	6	6
(Germany) M Möller	6	6
(France) T Faurel	1	3
Q	(Ukraine) O Krutykh	3	4
3	(Chile) M Soto	6	6
8	(Austria) S Kopp	6	6^{4}	6
Alt	(Brazil) E Ribeiro	1	7^{7}	1
(France) Raphael Perot	3	4
Q	(Switzerland) M Brunold	6	6
WC	(Germany) Henri Haupt	3	2
Q	Svyatoslav Gulin	6	6
(Switzerland) D Stricker	2	3
2	(Czech Republic) M Krumich	6	6

Second round
5	(Romania) C Crețu	7^{7}	7^{7}
(Spain) M Damas	6^{4}	6^{5}
(Germany) M Möller	6	7^{8}
3	(Chile) M Soto	3	6^{6}
8	(Austria) S Kopp	7^{7}	6
Q	(Switzerland) M Brunold	6^{3}	4
Q	S Gulin	6	4	1
2	(Czech Republic) M Krumich	4	6	6

Quarterfinals
5	(Romania) C Crețu	6	6
(Germany) M Möller	4	3
8	(Austria) S Kopp	6	6
2	(Czech Republic) M Krumich	2	4

Semifinals
5	(Romania) C Crețu	6	7
8	(Austria) S Kopp	3	5
