= 2025 INTARO Open II – Doubles =

Doubles
- 2025 INTARO Open II

Final
- Champions: (Czech Republic) Dominik Reček (Czech Republic) Daniel Siniakov
- Runners-up: (Italy) Simone Agostini (Italy) Tommaso Compagnucci
- Score: 6–2, 5–7, [11–9]

Events
Singles	Doubles
- INTARO Open

Neil Oberleitner and Mili Poljičak were the defending champions but chose not to defend their title.

Dominik Reček and Daniel Siniakov won the title after defeating Simone Agostini and Tommaso Compagnucci 6–2, 5–7, [11–9] in the final.

== Seeds ==
1. (Czech Republic) Jan Jermář / (Czech Republic) David Poljak (semifinals)
2. (Italy) Gianluca Cadenasso / (Italy) Filippo Romano (semifinals)
3. (Italy) Franco Agamenone / (Spain) Àlex Martí Pujolràs (quarterfinals, withdrew)
4. (Italy) Simone Agostini / (Italy) Tommaso Compagnucci (final)

== Draw ==
Key

- Q = Qualifier
- WC = Wild card
- LL = Lucky loser
- Alt = Alternate
- ITF = ITF entry
- PR = Protected ranking
- SR = Special ranking
- SE = Special exempt
- JE = Junior exempt
- JR = Junior Accelerator Programme entrant
- CO = College Accelerator Programme entrant
- NG = Next Gen Accelerator Program entrant
- w/o = Walkover
- r = Retired
- d = Defaulted

=== Draw ===
First round
(France) C Denolly (France) Mathys Erhard	w/o
Alt	(Spain) I Montes de la Torre (Spain) D Rincón
4	(Italy) Simone Agostini (Italy) Tommaso Compagnucci	w/o
Alt	(Romania) GA Boitan (Romania) FC Jianu
WC	(Romania) Alejandro Mateo Berge Nourescu (Romania) Darius Florin Pop	2	6	[7]
(United Kingdom) J MacKinlay (United Kingdom) Harry Rock	6	3	[10]
(Czech Republic) D Reček (Czech Republic) D Siniakov	7^{8}	6
WC	(Romania) Cezar Stefan Bentzel (Romania) Daniel Uta	6^{6}	0
Kirill Kivattsev (Ghana) I Nortey	6^{4}	4
3	(Italy) F Agamenone (Spain) Àlex Martí Pujolràs	7^{7}	6
(Venezuela) B Pérez (Mexico) M Sánchez	5	4
(Romania) Alexandru Cristian Dumitru (Romania) Ștefan Paloși	7	6
(Spain) M Alcalá Gurri (South Korea) G Campaña Lee	3	1
2	(Italy) G Cadenasso (Italy) F Romano	6	6

Quarterfinals
1	(Czech Republic) J Jermář (Czech Republic) D Poljak	6^{4}	6	[10]
(France) C Denolly (France) M Erhard	7^{7}	1	[8]
4	(Italy) S Agostini (Italy) T Compagnucci	7^{7}	4	[11]
(United Kingdom) J MacKinlay (United Kingdom) H Rock	6^{0}	6	[9]
(Czech Republic) D Reček (Czech Republic) D Siniakov	w/o
3	(Italy) F Agamenone (Spain) À Martí Pujolràs
(Romania) AC Dumitru (Romania) Ș Paloși	4	1
2	(Italy) G Cadenasso (Italy) F Romano	6	6

Semifinals
1	(Czech Republic) J Jermář (Czech Republic) D Poljak	4	6	[7]
4	(Italy) S Agostini (Italy) T Compagnucci	6	3	[10]
(Czech Republic) D Reček (Czech Republic) D Siniakov	4	6	[10]
2	(Italy) G Cadenasso (Italy) F Romano	6	3	[2]

Final
4	(Italy) S Agostini (Italy) T Compagnucci	2	7	[9]
(Czech Republic) D Reček (Czech Republic) D Siniakov	6	5	[11]
