= 2026 NÖ Open – Singles =

Singles
- 2026 NÖ Open

Final
- Champion: (Switzerland) Mika Brunold
- Runner-up: (Brazil) João Lucas Reis da Silva
- Score: 6–4, 6–3

Events
Singles	Doubles
- NÖ Open

Marco Trungelliti was the defending champion but chose not to defend his title.

Mika Brunold won the title after defeating João Lucas Reis da Silva 6–4, 6–3 in the final. The final was notable for being the first professional men's final contested between two openly gay players.

== Seeds ==
1. (Slovakia) Alex Molčan (first round)
2. (Brazil) Gustavo Heide (quarterfinals)
3. (Czech Republic) Zdeněk Kolář (quarterfinals)
4. (Ukraine) Vitaliy Sachko (semifinals)
5. (Austria) Lukas Neumayer (quarterfinals)
6. (Czech Republic) Maxim Mrva (first round, retired)
7. (Germany) Henri Squire (first round)
8. (Argentina) Alex Barrena (semifinals)

== Draw ==
Key

- Q = Qualifier
- WC = Wild card
- LL = Lucky loser
- Alt = Alternate
- ITF = ITF entry
- PR = Protected ranking
- SR = Special ranking
- SE = Special exempt
- JE = Junior exempt
- JR = Junior Accelerator Programme entrant
- CO = College Accelerator Programme entrant
- NG = Next Gen Accelerator Program entrant
- w/o = Walkover
- r = Retired
- d = Defaulted

=== Finals ===
Semifinals
(Brazil) João Lucas Reis da Silva	6	6
8	(Argentina) Alex Barrena	2	3
4	(Ukraine) Vitaliy Sachko	0	2
Q	(Switzerland) Mika Brunold	6	6

Final
(Brazil) João Lucas Reis da Silva	4	3
Q	(Switzerland) Mika Brunold	6	6

=== Top half ===
First round
1	(Slovakia) A Molčan	1	4
(Brazil) JL Reis da Silva	6	6
(Brazil) T Monteiro	6^{4}	6	7^{7}
Alt	(Germany) MH Rehberg	7^{7}	3	6^{5}
(Argentina) JM La Serna	6	3	6
(Romania) FC Jianu	4	6	3
Q	Svyatoslav Gulin	4	2
5	(Austria) L Neumayer	6	6
3	(Czech Republic) Z Kolář	6	7
Q	(Sweden) O Wallin	3	5
(Czech Republic) M Krumich	3	6	6
WC	(Austria) Sebastian Sorger	6	4	3
WC	(Austria) N Hipfl	6	6
(Czech Republic) H Bartoň	3	3
Alt	(Serbia) O Milić	6	2	3
8	(Argentina) A Barrena	3	6	6

Second round
(Brazil) JL Reis da Silva	6	6
(Brazil) T Monteiro	3	4
(Argentina) JM La Serna	5	7^{11}	1
5	(Austria) L Neumayer	7	6^{9}	6
3	(Czech Republic) Z Kolář	6	6
(Czech Republic) M Krumich	2	4
WC	(Austria) N Hipfl	2	7^{7}	3
8	(Argentina) A Barrena	6	6^{3}	6

Quarterfinals
(Brazil) JL Reis da Silva	7^{7}	6
5	(Austria) L Neumayer	6^{4}	4
3	(Czech Republic) Z Kolář	7^{7}	5	5
8	(Argentina) A Barrena	6^{2}	7	7

Semifinals
(Brazil) JL Reis da Silva	6	6
8	(Argentina) A Barrena	2	3

=== Bottom half ===
First round
6	(Czech Republic) M Mrva	2^{r}
Alt	(Germany) M Möller	5
(Chile) M Soto	7^{7}	6
(Austria) S Kopp	6^{5}	2
Alt	(Germany) M Topo	6	4	6
(Colombia) DE Galán	2	6	3
Q	(Czech Republic) D Siniakov	4	5
4	(Ukraine) V Sachko	6	7
7	(Germany) H Squire	4	0
WC	(Austria) F Misolic	6	6
(Spain) M Damas	3	0^{r}
Q	(Switzerland) M Brunold	6	4
Q	(Slovakia) L Pokorný	2	7	0
Q	(Germany) D Dedura	6	5	6
(France) Sean Cuenin	3	4
2	(Brazil) G Heide	6	6

Second round
Alt	(Germany) M Möller	4	6	0
(Chile) M Soto	6	3	6
Alt	(Germany) M Topo	2	4
4	(Ukraine) V Sachko	6	6
WC	(Austria) F Misolic	1	7^{7}	2
Q	(Switzerland) M Brunold	6	6^{2}	6
Q	(Germany) D Dedura	1	5
2	(Brazil) G Heide	6	7

Quarterfinals
(Chile) M Soto	3	6	2
4	(Ukraine) V Sachko	6	1	6
Q	(Switzerland) M Brunold	6	6
2	(Brazil) G Heide	2	1

Semifinals
4	(Ukraine) V Sachko	0	2
Q	(Switzerland) M Brunold	6	6
