= 2026 Open de Roanne – Singles =

Singles
- 2026 Open de Roanne

Final
- Champion: (Switzerland) Mika Brunold
- Runner-up: (France) Matteo Martineau
- Score: 2–6, 7–6^{(7–5)}, 6–1

Events
| Singles | Doubles |
- Open de Roanne

Otto Virtanen was the defending champion but lost in the second round to Dominic Stricker.

Mika Brunold won the title after defeating Matteo Martineau 2–6, 7–6^{(7–5)}, 6–1 in the final.

== Seeds ==
1. (France) Hugo Gaston (quarterfinals)
2. (France) Benjamin Bonzi (second round)
3. (Finland) Otto Virtanen (second round)
4. (France) Giovanni Mpetshi Perricard (first round)
5. (France) Clément Chidekh (first round)
6. (Norway) Nicolai Budkov Kjær (semifinals)
7. (France) Clément Tabur (second round)
8. (Belgium) Gauthier Onclin (first round)

== Draw ==
Key

- Q = Qualifier
- WC = Wild card
- LL = Lucky loser
- Alt = Alternate
- ITF = ITF entry
- PR = Protected ranking
- SR = Special ranking
- SE = Special exempt
- JE = Junior exempt
- JR = Junior Accelerator Programme entrant
- CO = College Accelerator Programme entrant
- NG = Next Gen Accelerator Program entrant
- w/o = Walkover
- r = Retired
- d = Defaulted

=== Finals ===
Semifinals
6 | (Norway) Nicolai Budkov Kjær | 5 | 6^{4}
(France) Matteo Martineau | 7 | 7^{7}
Alt | (Switzerland) Jérôme Kym | 6^{2} | 6^{3}
(Switzerland) Mika Brunold | 7^{7} | 7^{7}

Final
(France) Matteo Martineau | 6 | 6^{5} | 1
(Switzerland) Mika Brunold | 2 | 7^{7} | 6

=== Top half ===
First round
1 | (France) H Gaston | 6 | 6
WC | (France) Daniel Jade | 1 | 1
(France) P-H Herbert | 6 | 6
Q | (Slovakia) N Gombos | 3 | 2
(France) M Kouamé | 6 | 6
(Germany) D Dedura | 1 | 4
Q | (Switzerland) J Paul | 4 | 5
6 | (Norway) N Budkov Kjær | 6 | 7
4 | (France) G Mpetshi Perricard | 6^{5} | 6^{3}
Q | (France) Étienne Donnet | 7^{7} | 7^{7}
(France) M Martineau | 6 | 7^{7}
NG | (Germany) M Schönhaus | 2 | 6^{5}
(France) S Gueymard Wayenburg | 6 | 6
(United Kingdom) L Broady | 4 | 4
Q | (Switzerland) H Bernet | 6^{5} | 6 | 3
7 | (France) C Tabur | 7^{7} | 3 | 6

Second round
1 | (France) H Gaston | 3 | 6 | 6
(France) P-H Herbert | 6 | 3 | 4
(France) M Kouamé | 4 | 2
6 | (Norway) N Budkov Kjær | 6 | 6
Q | (France) É Donnet | 7 | 4 | 2
(France) M Martineau | 5 | 6 | 6
(France) S Gueymard Wayenburg | 7^{12} | 6
7 | (France) C Tabur | 6^{10} | 3

Quarterfinals
1 | (France) H Gaston | 1 | 6^{7}
6 | (Norway) N Budkov Kjær | 6 | 7^{9}
(France) M Martineau | 6 | 6
(France) S Gueymard Wayenburg | 3 | 4

Semifinals
6 | (Norway) N Budkov Kjær | 5 | 6^{4}
(France) M Martineau | 7 | 7^{7}

=== Bottom half ===
First round
5 | (France) C Chidekh | 6^{6} | 6^{3}
Alt | (Switzerland) J Kym | 7^{8} | 7^{7}
Q | (France) U Blanchet | 7^{7} | 6
Q | (France) T Paris | 6^{5} | 3
(Switzerland) D Stricker | 6 | 6
(South Africa) P Henning | 2 | 3
(Switzerland) R Bertola | 5 | 5
3 | (Finland) O Virtanen | 7 | 7
8 | (Belgium) G Onclin | 4 | 7^{7} | 4
(France) F Balshaw | 6 | 6^{3} | 6
WC | (France) M Bobichon | 7 | 7^{7}
(United Kingdom) B Harris | 5 | 6^{5}
(Switzerland) M Brunold | 7^{7} | 6
WC | (France) Mathys Domenc | 6^{2} | 3
Alt | (France) H Grenier | 7^{7} | 1 | 3
2 | (France) B Bonzi | 6^{5} | 6 | 6

Second round
Alt | (Switzerland) J Kym | 6 | 6
Q | (France) U Blanchet | 1 | 3
(Switzerland) D Stricker | 7 | 5 | 6
3 | (Finland) O Virtanen | 5 | 7 | 3
(France) F Balshaw | 6 | 6
WC | (France) M Bobichon | 3 | 4
(Switzerland) M Brunold | 6 | 2 | 6
2 | (France) B Bonzi | 2 | 6 | 4

Quarterfinals
Alt | (Switzerland) J Kym | w/o
(Switzerland) D Stricker
(France) F Balshaw | 3 | 6 | 3
(Switzerland) M Brunold | 6 | 2 | 6

Semifinals
Alt | (Switzerland) J Kym | 6^{2} | 6^{3}
(Switzerland) M Brunold | 7^{7} | 7^{7}
