= 2026 Open Sopra Steria de Lyon – Singles =

Singles
- 2026 Open Sopra Steria de Lyon

Final
- Champion: (Spain) David Jordà Sanchis
- Runner-up: (France) Felix Balshaw
- Score: 6–4, 7–6^{(7–4)}

Events
| Singles | Doubles |
- Open Sopra Steria de Lyon

Marco Trungelliti was the defending champion but lost in the second round to Daniel Elahi Galán.

David Jordà Sanchis won the title after defeating Felix Balshaw 6–4, 7–6^{(7–4)} in the final.

== Seeds ==
1. (Argentina) Marco Trungelliti (second round)
2. (France) Luca Van Assche (second round)
3. (Lithuania) Vilius Gaubas (first round)
4. (Spain) Pedro Martínez (second round)
5. (France) Clément Tabur (quarterfinals)
6. (United States) Tristan Boyer (semifinals)
7. (Belgium) Kimmer Coppejans (quarterfinals)
8. (Italy) Lorenzo Giustino (first round)

== Draw ==
Key

- Q = Qualifier
- WC = Wild card
- LL = Lucky loser
- Alt = Alternate
- ITF = ITF entry
- PR = Protected ranking
- SR = Special ranking
- SE = Special exempt
- JE = Junior exempt
- JR = Junior Accelerator Programme entrant
- CO = College Accelerator Programme entrant
- NG = Next Gen Accelerator Program entrant
- w/o = Walkover
- r = Retired
- d = Defaulted

=== Finals ===
Semifinals
(Colombia) Daniel Elahi Galán | 6 | 3 | 5
WC | (France) Felix Balshaw | 4 | 6 | 7
LL | (Spain) David Jordà Sanchis | 3 | 6 | 7
6 | (United States) Tristan Boyer | 6 | 4 | 5

Final
WC | (France) Felix Balshaw | 4 | 6^{4}
LL | (Spain) David Jordà Sanchis | 6 | 7^{7}

=== Top half ===
First round
1 | (Argentina) M Trungelliti | 6^{7} | 6 | 6
P Kotov | 7^{9} | 4 | 2
(France) L Pavlovic | 6^{3} | 2
(Colombia) DE Galán | 7^{7} | 6
(France) C Hemery | 7^{7} | 3 | 6^{5}
(Spain) A Moro Cañas | 6^{5} | 6 | 7^{7}
(Serbia) L Djere | 2 | 6 | 4
7 | (Belgium) K Coppejans | 6 | 2 | 6
4 | (Spain) P Martínez | 7 | 6
Q | Svyatoslav Gulin | 5 | 1
Q | (Switzerland) Luca Stäheli | 6^{1} | 5
WC | (France) F Balshaw | 7^{7} | 7
WC | (France) T Faurel | 6^{5} | 6 | 6
(France) F Bax | 7^{7} | 3 | 3
(France) S Gueymard Wayenburg | 4 | 3
5 | (France) C Tabur | 6 | 6

Second round
1 | (Argentina) M Trungelliti | 7^{14} | 3 | 5
(Colombia) DE Galán | 6^{12} | 6 | 7
(Spain) A Moro Cañas | 7^{7} | 1 | 1
7 | (Belgium) K Coppejans | 6^{1} | 6 | 6
4 | (Spain) P Martínez | 6 | 1 | 4
WC | (France) F Balshaw | 4 | 6 | 6
WC | (France) T Faurel | 5 | 4
5 | (France) C Tabur | 7 | 6

Quarterfinals
(Colombia) DE Galán | 6 | 0 | 6
7 | (Belgium) K Coppejans | 4 | 6 | 4
WC | (France) F Balshaw | 6 | 6
5 | (France) C Tabur | 2 | 4

Semifinals
(Colombia) DE Galán | 6 | 3 | 5
WC | (France) F Balshaw | 4 | 6 | 7

=== Bottom half ===
First round
8 | (Italy) L Giustino | 2 | 4
Alt | (Spain) D Rincón | 6 | 6
Q | (Spain) M Alcalá Gurri | 5 | 2
Alt | (United States) Dali Blanch | 7 | 6
LL | (Spain) D Jordà Sanchis | 7 | 6
Q | (Spain) A Sánchez Quílez | 5 | 2
(Spain) M Damas | 6 | 6
3 | (Lithuania) V Gaubas | 4 | 0
6 | (United States) T Boyer | 6 | 6
Q | (France) Raphael Perot | 3 | 2
Q | (France) M Martineau | 6^{4} | 6 | 6
WC | (France) Mickael Kaouk | 7^{7} | 4 | 2
Alt | (France) R Bertrand | 3 | 2
(Spain) N Sánchez Izquierdo | 6 | 6
(France) H Grenier | 1 | 2
2 | (France) L Van Assche | 6 | 6

Second round
Alt | (Spain) D Rincón | 2 | 2
Alt | (United States) Dal Blanch | 6 | 6
LL | (Spain) D Jordà Sanchis | 6 | 6
(Spain) M Damas | 1 | 4
6 | (United States) T Boyer | 6 | 6
Q | (France) M Martineau | 3 | 3
(Spain) N Sánchez Izquierdo | 7^{7} | 1 | 6
2 | (France) L Van Assche | 6^{3} | 6 | 4

Quarterfinals
Alt | (United States) Dal Blanch | 7^{7} | 3 | 2
LL | (Spain) D Jordà Sanchis | 6^{2} | 6 | 6
6 | (United States) T Boyer | 6 | 2 | 7^{7}
(Spain) N Sánchez Izquierdo | 2 | 6 | 6^{2}

Semifinals
LL | (Spain) D Jordà Sanchis | 3 | 6 | 7
6 | (United States) T Boyer | 6 | 4 | 5
