= 2026 Bosphorus Challenger Cup – Doubles =

Doubles
- 2026 Bosphorus Challenger Cup

Final
- Champions: (United States) George Goldhoff (United States) Theodore Winegar
- Runners-up: (Czech Republic) Filip Duda (Serbia) Stefan Latinović
- Score: 7–5, 6–2

Events
Singles	Doubles
- Bosphorus Challenger Cup

This was the first edition of the tournament.

George Goldhoff and Theodore Winegar won the title after defeating Filip Duda and Stefan Latinović 7–5, 6–2 in the final.

== Seeds ==
1. (India) Anirudh Chandrasekar / (United States) Nathaniel Lammons (quarterfinals)
2. (Denmark) Johannes Ingildsen / (United Kingdom) Joshua Paris (first round)
3. (United States) George Goldhoff / (United States) Theodore Winegar (champions)
4. (India) Siddhant Banthia / (Poland) Szymon Kielan (quarterfinals, retired)

== Draw ==
Key

- Q = Qualifier
- WC = Wild card
- LL = Lucky loser
- Alt = Alternate
- ITF = ITF entry
- PR = Protected ranking
- SR = Special ranking
- SE = Special exempt
- JE = Junior exempt
- JR = Junior Accelerator Programme entrant
- CO = College Accelerator Programme entrant
- NG = Next Gen Accelerator Program entrant
- w/o = Walkover
- r = Retired
- d = Defaulted

First round
1	(India) A Chandrasekar (United States) N Lammons	6	6
(Brazil) L Britto (Brazil) PA Saraiva dos Santos	3	2
WC	(Turkey) S Mert Özdemir (Turkey) MN Türker	4	4
(Spain) Í Cervantes (Ukraine) D Molchanov	6	6
3	(United States) G Goldhoff (United States) T Winegar	3	7	[10]
(Brazil) D Dutra da Silva (Slovakia) L Pokorný	6	5	[5]
(Czech Republic) H Bartoň (Czech Republic) M Vrbenský	4	6	[4]
(Romania) A Jecan (Romania) B Pavel	6	4	[10]
(Spain) S Martos Gornés (Poland) S Walków	6	6
(United States) A Ayeni (Australia) Ethan Cook	3	3
(South Korea) J-s Nam (Finland) P Niklas-Salminen	4	6^{6}
4	(India) S Banthia (Poland) S Kielan	6	7^{8}
WC	(Turkey) E Kırkın; M Sharipov	4	4
(India) VSP Natarajan (India) R Ramanathan	6	6
(Czech Republic) F Duda (Serbia) S Latinović	6	6
2	(Denmark) J Ingildsen (United Kingdom) J Paris	3	4

Quarterfinals
1	(India) A Chandrasekar (United States) N Lammons	6	4	[3]
(Spain) Í Cervantes (Ukraine) D Molchanov	3	6	[10]
3	(United States) G Goldhoff (United States) T Winegar	6	6
(Romania) A Jecan (Romania) B Pavel	4	4
(Spain) S Martos Gornés (Poland) S Walków	7^{7}	3
4	(India) S Banthia (Poland) S Kielan	6^{5}	2^{r}
(India) VSP Natarajan (India) R Ramanathan	3	4
(Czech Republic) F Duda (Serbia) S Latinović	6	6

Semifinals
(Spain) Í Cervantes (Ukraine) D Molchanov	2	7^{9}	[8]
3	(United States) G Goldhoff (United States) T Winegar	6	6^{7}	[10]
(Spain) S Martos Gornés (Poland) S Walków	3	7^{7}	[7]
(Czech Republic) F Duda (Serbia) S Latinović	6	6^{5}	[10]

Final
3	(United States) G Goldhoff (United States) T Winegar	7	6
(Czech Republic) F Duda (Serbia) S Latinović	5	2
