= 2026 Brest Challenger =

- Date: 26 October – 1 November
- Edition: 11th
- Surface: Hard (indoor)
- Location: Brest, France

Champions

Singles
- (France) Moïse Kouamé

Doubles
- (Ecuador) Gonzalo Escobar / (India) Niki Kaliyanda Poonacha
- Brest Challenger

The 2026 Brest Open Groupe Vert was a professional tennis tournament played on hard courts. It was the 11th edition of the tournament which was part of the 2026 ATP Challenger Tour. It took place in Brest, France between 26 October and 1 November 2026.

== Singles main-draw entrants ==
=== Seeds ===
Country	Player	Rank^{1}	Seed
FRA	Hugo Gaston	93	1
CRO	Dino Prižmić	95	2
GBR	Toby Samuel	96	3
HUN	Zsombor Piros	103	4
USA	Martin Damm	107	5
FIN	Otto Virtanen	121	6
JPN	Shintaro Mochizuki	129	7
USA	Nishesh Basavareddy	134	8

- ^{1} Rankings are as of 19 October 2026.

=== Other entrants ===
The following players received wildcards into the singles main draw:

- (France) Felix Balshaw
- (France) Pierre-Hugues Herbert
- (France) Matteo Martineau

The following players received entry into the singles main draw as special exempts:

- (Italy) ~~Michele Ribecai~~
- (Italy) Filippo Romano

The following player received entry into the singles main draw as an alternate:

- (France) Hugo Grenier

The following players received entry from the qualifying draw:

- (France) Ugo Blanchet
- (France) Matisse Bobichon
- (France) Robin Catry
- (Tunisia) Moez Echargui
- (Belgium) Michael Geerts
- (France) Tom Paris

The following player received entry as a lucky loser:

- (Switzerland) Kilian Feldbausch

== Champions ==
=== Singles ===
- (France) Moïse Kouamé def. (United States) Martin Damm 6–4, 6–7^{(5–7)}, 7–6^{(7–4)}.

=== Doubles ===
- (Ecuador) Gonzalo Escobar / (India) Niki Kaliyanda Poonacha def. (India) Sriram Balaji / (United States) Evan King 7–6^{(7–4)}, 6–7^{(4–7)}, [10–7].
