= 2025 INTARO Open II =

- Date: 16–21 September
- Edition: 2nd
- Surface: Clay
- Location: Târgu Mureș, Romania

Champions

Singles
- (Italy) Franco Agamenone

Doubles
- (Czech Republic) Dominik Reček / (Czech Republic) Daniel Siniakov
- INTARO Open

The 2025 INTARO Open II was a professional tennis tournament played on clay courts. It was the second edition of the tournament which was part of the 2025 ATP Challenger Tour. It took place in Târgu Mureș, Romania between 16 and 21 September 2025.

== Singles main-draw entrants ==
=== Seeds ===
Country	Player	Rank^{1}	Seed
GBR	Jay Clarke	192	1
ESP	Daniel Rincón	210	2
BUL	Dimitar Kuzmanov	260	3
FRA	Mathys Erhard	263	4
ROU	Filip Cristian Jianu	264	5
ITA	Lorenzo Giustino	273	6
ESP	Nicolás Álvarez Varona	300	7
SUI	Mika Brunold	316	8

^{1} Rankings are as of 8 September 2025.

=== Other entrants ===
The following players received wildcards into the singles main draw:

- (Romania) Cezar Stefan Bentzel
- (Romania) Mihai Alexandru Coman
- (Romania) Sebastian Gima

The following players received entry from the qualifying draw:

- (South Korea) Gerard Campaña Lee
- (France) Thomas Faurel
- (Belgium) Jack Logé
- (France) Amaury Raynel
- (Romania) Dan Alexandru Tomescu
- (Romania) Daniel Uta

== Champions ==
=== Singles ===
- (Italy) Franco Agamenone def. (United Kingdom) Jay Clarke 6–3, 6–4.

=== Doubles ===
- (Czech Republic) Dominik Reček / (Czech Republic) Daniel Siniakov def. (Italy) Simone Agostini / (Italy) Tommaso Compagnucci 6–2, 5–7, [11–9].
