= 2026 Open Sopra Steria de Lyon – Doubles =

Doubles
- 2026 Open Sopra Steria de Lyon

Final
- Champions: (Thailand) Pruchya Isaro (India) Niki Kaliyanda Poonacha
- Runners-up: (Tunisia) Skander Mansouri (Austria) Maximilian Neuchrist
- Score: 6–0, 6–1

Events
Singles	Doubles
- Open Sopra Steria de Lyon

Hsu Yu-hsiou and Kaichi Uchida were the defending champions but chose not to defend their title.

Pruchya Isaro and Niki Kaliyanda Poonacha won the title after defeating Skander Mansouri and Maximilian Neuchrist 6–0, 6–1 in the final.

== Seeds ==
1. (Argentina) Mariano Kestelboim / (Mexico) Miguel Ángel Reyes-Varela (first round)
2. (Poland) Szymon Kielan / (Australia) Matthew Romios (first round)
3. (United States) George Goldhoff / (Canada) Cleeve Harper (first round)
4. (Thailand) Pruchya Isaro / (India) Niki Kaliyanda Poonacha (champions)

== Draw ==
Key

- Q = Qualifier
- WC = Wild card
- LL = Lucky loser
- Alt = Alternate
- ITF = ITF entry
- PR = Protected ranking
- SR = Special ranking
- SE = Special exempt
- JE = Junior exempt
- JR = Junior Accelerator Programme entrant
- CO = College Accelerator Programme entrant
- NG = Next Gen Accelerator Program entrant
- w/o = Walkover
- r = Retired
- d = Defaulted

First round
1	(Argentina) M Kestelboim (Mexico) M Reyes-Varela	2	4
(Bolivia) B Arias (Denmark) J Ingildsen	6	6
(India) SDP Dev (India) Nitin Kumar Sinha	6	3	[5]
Alt	(Spain) Ignasi Forcano (Netherlands) M Vervoort	3	6	[10]
4	(Thailand) P Isaro (India) N Kaliyanda Poonacha	6	6
(Spain) M Mansilla Díez (Spain) B Winter López	4	4
(France) F Balshaw (France) M Martineau	6	7
(France) G Blancaneaux (France) L Poullain	2	5
(Germany) T Rühl (Germany) K Wehnelt	6	6
WC	(France) Gabriel Gomez (United States) Avi Shugar	1	0
WC	(France) Maé Malige (France) Noah Malige	7^{7}	6^{7}	[10]
3	(United States) G Goldhoff (Canada) C Harper	6^{5}	7^{9}	[3]
(France) R Bertrand (France) C Bittoun Kouzmine	2	2
(Spain) B Pujol Navarro (Spain) D Vega Hernández	6	6
(Tunisia) S Mansouri (Austria) M Neuchrist	6	6
2	(Poland) S Kielan (Australia) M Romios	4	3

Quarterfinals
(Bolivia) B Arias (Denmark) J Ingildsen	3	6	[12]
Alt	(Spain) I Forcano (Netherlands) M Vervoort	6	2	[10]
4	(Thailand) P Isaro (India) N Kaliyanda Poonacha	7^{7}	6
(France) F Balshaw (France) M Martineau	6^{5}	3
(Germany) T Rühl (Germany) K Wehnelt	7^{8}	6
WC	(France) M Malige (France) N Malige	6^{6}	3
(Spain) B Pujol Navarro (Spain) D Vega Hernández	3	4
(Tunisia) S Mansouri (Austria) M Neuchrist	6	6

Semifinals
(Bolivia) B Arias (Denmark) J Ingildsen	2	2
4	(Thailand) P Isaro (India) N Kaliyanda Poonacha	6	6
(Germany) T Rühl (Germany) K Wehnelt	3	4
(Tunisia) S Mansouri (Austria) M Neuchrist	6	6

Final
4	(Thailand) P Isaro (India) N Kaliyanda Poonacha	6	6
(Tunisia) S Mansouri (Austria) M Neuchrist	0	1
