= 2026 Schwaben Open – Doubles =

Doubles
- 2026 Schwaben Open

Final
- Champions: (Czech Republic) Dominik Reček (Czech Republic) Daniel Siniakov
- Runners-up: (Argentina) Juan Manuel La Serna (Brazil) Eduardo Ribeiro
- Score: 6–2, 6–3

Events
Singles	Doubles
- Schwaben Open

Daniel Masur and Benito Sanchez Martinez were the defending champions but lost in the first round to Mili Poljičak and Marko Topo.

Dominik Reček and Daniel Siniakov won the title after defeating Juan Manuel La Serna and Eduardo Ribeiro 6–2, 6–3 in the final.

== Seeds ==
1. (Uruguay) Ignacio Carou / (Argentina) Facundo Mena (semifinals)
2. (Bulgaria) Anthony Genov / (Germany) Kai Wehnelt (quarterfinals)
3. (Bolivia) Boris Arias / (Bolivia) Murkel Dellien (first round)
4. (Czech Republic) Dominik Reček / (Czech Republic) Daniel Siniakov (champions)

== Draw ==
Key

- Q = Qualifier
- WC = Wild card
- LL = Lucky loser
- Alt = Alternate
- ITF = ITF entry
- PR = Protected ranking
- SR = Special ranking
- SE = Special exempt
- JE = Junior exempt
- JR = Junior Accelerator Programme entrant
- CO = College Accelerator Programme entrant
- NG = Next Gen Accelerator Program entrant
- w/o = Walkover
- r = Retired
- d = Defaulted

First round
1	(Uruguay) I Carou (Argentina) F Mena	6	6
(Italy) Federico Iannaccone (Ukraine) G Kravchenko	3	4
(Peru) A Merino (United States) Michael Zhu	2	3
(Germany) J Opitz (Latvia) R Strombachs	6	6
4	(Czech Republic) D Reček (Czech Republic) D Siniakov	6	6
(Argentina) Juan Estévez (Turkey) E Kırkın	4	4
(Croatia) M Poljičak (Germany) M Topo	7^{7}	6
WC	(Germany) D Masur (Germany) B Sanchez Martinez	6^{3}	2
(South Africa) Alec Beckley (South Africa) Vasilios Caripi	5	6	[10]
WC	(Germany) Tom Bittner (Germany) Noah Thurner	7	1	[6]
(India) A Kalyanpur (India) J Nedunchezhiyan	3	6	[13]
3	(Bolivia) B Arias (Bolivia) M Dellien	6	3	[11]
(Colombia) C Rodríguez (Kazakhstan) D Yevseyev	6	3	[3]
(Argentina) JM La Serna (Brazil) E Ribeiro	4	6	[10]
(Bosnia and Herzegovina) M Bašić (Bosnia and Herzegovina) A Nedić	5	6^{2}
2	(Bulgaria) A Genov (Germany) K Wehnelt	7	7^{7}

Quarterfinals
1	(Uruguay) I Carou (Argentina) F Mena	6	6
(Germany) J Opitz (Latvia) R Strombachs	4	4
4	(Czech Republic) D Reček (Czech Republic) D Siniakov	1	6	[10]
(Croatia) M Poljičak (Germany) M Topo	6	3	[4]
(South Africa) A Beckley (South Africa) V Caripi	5	5
(India) A Kalyanpur (India) J Nedunchezhiyan	7	7
(Argentina) JM La Serna (Brazil) E Ribeiro	6	6
2	(Bulgaria) A Genov (Germany) K Wehnelt	2	3

Semifinals
1	(Uruguay) I Carou (Argentina) F Mena	3	4
4	(Czech Republic) D Reček (Czech Republic) D Siniakov	6	6
(India) A Kalyanpur (India) J Nedunchezhiyan	6	2	[6]
(Argentina) JM La Serna (Brazil) E Ribeiro	4	6	[10]

Final
4	(Czech Republic) D Reček (Czech Republic) D Siniakov	6	6
(Argentina) JM La Serna (Brazil) E Ribeiro	2	3
