= 2026 Bosphorus Challenger Cup – Singles =

Singles
- 2026 Bosphorus Challenger Cup

Final
- Champion: (Spain) David Jordà Sanchis
- Runner-up: (Bosnia and Herzegovina) Andrej Nedić
- Score: 6–4, 6–4

Events
Singles	Doubles
- Bosphorus Challenger Cup

This was the first edition of the tournament.

David Jordà Sanchis won the title after defeating Andrej Nedić 6–4, 6–4 in the final.

== Seeds ==
1. (Spain) Pol Martín Tiffon (second round)
2. (Spain) Nikolás Sánchez Izquierdo (quarterfinals)
3. (Bosnia and Herzegovina) Andrej Nedić (final)
4. (Romania) Filip Cristian Jianu (first round)
5. (Italy) Franco Agamenone (semifinals)
6. (United States) Andres Martin (first round)
7. (Czech Republic) Hynek Bartoň (semifinals)
8. (Czech Republic) Jonáš Forejtek (first round)

== Draw ==
Key

- Q = Qualifier
- WC = Wild card
- LL = Lucky loser
- Alt = Alternate
- ITF = ITF entry
- PR = Protected ranking
- SR = Special ranking
- SE = Special exempt
- JE = Junior exempt
- JR = Junior Accelerator Programme entrant
- CO = College Accelerator Programme entrant
- NG = Next Gen Accelerator Program entrant
- w/o = Walkover
- r = Retired
- d = Defaulted

=== Finals ===
Semifinals
5	(Italy) Franco Agamenone	4	2
3	(Bosnia and Herzegovina) Andrej Nedić	6	6
7	(Czech Republic) Hynek Bartoň	3	7^{7}	1
Alt	(Spain) David Jordà Sanchis	6	6^{4}	6

Final
3	(Bosnia and Herzegovina) Andrej Nedić	4	4
Alt	(Spain) David Jordà Sanchis	6	6

=== Top half ===
First round
1	(Spain) P Martín Tiffon	6	6
JR	(France) YT Alexandrescou	2	3
(Brazil) T Monteiro	6	6
Q	(Spain) A Sánchez Quílez	4	1
WC	(Turkey) MN Türker	6	4	6^{2}
Q	(United States) A Ayeni	3	6	7^{7}
WC	(Turkey) T Duran	3	2
5	(Italy) F Agamenone	6	6
3	(Bosnia and Herzegovina) A Nedić	6	6
(Uzbekistan) S Fomin	4	2
(Turkey) Mert Alkaya	6	6
Q	(Ukraine) G Kravchenko	3	1
Q	(France) L Poullain	6^{2}	1
(Croatia) M Poljičak	7^{7}	6
(Czech Republic) M Mrva	4	6	6
8	(Czech Republic) J Forejtek	6	4	2

Second round
1	(Spain) P Martín Tiffon	2	6	6^{5}
(Brazil) T Monteiro	6	3	7^{7}
Q	(United States) A Ayeni	3	5
5	(Italy) F Agamenone	6	7
3	(Bosnia and Herzegovina) A Nedić	6	6
(Turkey) M Alkaya	1	4
(Croatia) M Poljičak	6	2	6
(Czech Republic) M Mrva	3	6	3

Quarterfinals
(Brazil) T Monteiro	2	3
5	(Italy) F Agamenone	6	6
3	(Bosnia and Herzegovina) A Nedić	6	6
(Croatia) M Poljičak	1	2

Semifinals
5	(Italy) F Agamenone	4	2
3	(Bosnia and Herzegovina) A Nedić	6	6

=== Bottom half ===
First round
7	(Czech Republic) H Bartoň	3	6	6
LL	(Brazil) D Dutra da Silva	6	2	2
WC	(Turkey) Kerem Yılmaz	7^{7}	3	1^{r}
Q	(United Kingdom) A Matusevich	6^{5}	6	1
(Poland) D Michalski	6	6
M Sharipov	3	4
(Lebanon) B Hassan	6	6
4	(Romania) FC Jianu	4	2
6	(United States) A Martin	6	5	3
Alt	(Spain) D Jordà Sanchis	2	7	6
Q	(Brazil) PA Saraiva dos Santos	6	3	6^{5}
Alt	(Kazakhstan) D Yevseyev	3	6	7^{7}
(Bulgaria) D Kuzmanov	6	6
(Spain) D Rincón	2	0
Alt	(Spain) C Sánchez Jover	3	4
2	(Spain) N Sánchez Izquierdo	6	6

Second round
7	(Czech Republic) H Bartoň	6	7
Q	(United Kingdom) A Matusevich	3	5
(Poland) D Michalski	6	5	7
(Lebanon) B Hassan	3	7	5
Alt	(Spain) D Jordà Sanchis	7	6
Alt	(Kazakhstan) D Yevseyev	5	2
(Bulgaria) D Kuzmanov	0	7^{7}	1
2	(Spain) N Sánchez Izquierdo	6	6^{4}	6

Quarterfinals
7	(Czech Republic) H Bartoň	6	6
(Poland) D Michalski	3	4
Alt	(Spain) D Jordà Sanchis	6	6
2	(Spain) N Sánchez Izquierdo	2	4

Semifinals
7	(Czech Republic) H Bartoň	3	7^{7}	1
Alt	(Spain) D Jordà Sanchis	6	6^{4}	6
