= 2026 Brest Challenger – Doubles =

Doubles
- 2026 Brest Challenger

Final
- Champions: (Ecuador) Gonzalo Escobar (India) Niki Kaliyanda Poonacha
- Runners-up: (India) Sriram Balaji (United States) Evan King
- Score: 7–6^{(7–4)}, 6–7^{(4–7)}, [10–7]

Events
Singles	Doubles
- Brest Challenger

Sander Gillé and Sem Verbeek were the defending champions, but chose not to defend their title.

Gonzalo Escobar and Niki Kaliyanda Poonacha won the title after defeating Sriram Balaji and Evan King 7–6^{(7–4)}, 6–7^{(4–7)}, [10–7] in the final.

== Seeds ==
1. (India) Sriram Balaji / (United States) Evan King (final)
2. (Ecuador) Gonzalo Escobar / (India) Niki Kaliyanda Poonacha (champions)
3. Ivan Liutarevich / (United Kingdom) Joshua Paris (semifinals)
4. (Croatia) Admir Kalender / (Croatia) Nino Serdarušić (first round)

== Draw ==
Key

- Q = Qualifier
- WC = Wild card
- LL = Lucky loser
- Alt = Alternate
- ITF = ITF entry
- PR = Protected ranking
- SR = Special ranking
- SE = Special exempt
- JE = Junior exempt
- JR = Junior Accelerator Programme entrant
- CO = College Accelerator Programme entrant
- NG = Next Gen Accelerator Program entrant
- w/o = Walkover
- r = Retired
- d = Defaulted

First round
(Ukraine) Andriy Poritskyi (Ukraine) Vadym Ursu	4	7^{7}	[10]
(Belgium) M Geerts (Germany) T Rühl	6	6^{1}	[7]
4	(Croatia) A Kalender (Croatia) N Serdarušić	7^{7}	6^{1}	[9]
Alt	(Italy) F Maestrelli (Italy) F Romano	6^{4}	7^{7}	[11]
(United States) B Kittay (Japan) T Yuzuki	6	7^{12}
(United States) M Damm (Czech Republic) M Vrbenský	3	6^{10}
(United Kingdom) James Hopper (United Kingdom) M Whitehouse	6^{7}	6	[10]
(France) Robin Catry (Poland) Piotr Pawlak	7^{9}	3	[5]
(France) F Balshaw (France) M Martineau	6	6
(Algeria) Samir Hamza Reguig (Belgium) Nicolas Ifi	2	2

Quarterfinals
1	(India) S Balaji (United States) E King	6	6^{9}	[10]
(Ukraine) A Poritskyi (Ukraine) V Ursu	3	7^{11}	[5]
Alt	(Italy) F Maestrelli (Italy) F Romano
(United States) B Kittay (Japan) T Yuzuki	w/o
(United Kingdom) J Hopper (United Kingdom) M Whitehouse	6	6^{3}	[6]
3	I Liutarevich (United Kingdom) J Paris	4	7^{7}	[10]
(France) F Balshaw (France) M Martineau
2	(Ecuador) G Escobar (India) N Kaliyanda Poonacha	w/o

Semifinals
1	(India) S Balaji (United States) E King	6	7^{8}
(United States) B Kittay (Japan) T Yuzuki	2	6^{6}
3	I Liutarevich (United Kingdom) J Paris	4	4
2	(Ecuador) G Escobar (India) N Kaliyanda Poonacha	6	6

Final
1	(India) S Balaji (United States) E King	6^{4}	7^{7}	[7]
2	(Ecuador) G Escobar (India) N Kaliyanda Poonacha	7^{7}	6^{4}	[10]
