= 2026 Brest Challenger – Singles =

Singles
- 2026 Brest Challenger

Final
- Champion: (France) Moïse Kouamé
- Runner-up: (United States) Martin Damm
- Score: 6–4, 6–7^{(5–7)}, 7–6^{(7–4)}

Events
Singles	Doubles
- Brest Challenger

Hugo Gaston was the defending champion but retired from his second round match against Moïse Kouamé.

Kouamé won the title after defeating Martin Damm 6–4, 6–7^{(5–7)}, 7–6^{(7–4)} in the final. He became the youngest Frenchman to win a Challenger trophy since a 17-year-old Richard Gasquet in 2003.

== Seeds ==
1. (France) Hugo Gaston (second round, retired)
2. (Croatia) Dino Prižmić (semifinals)
3. (United Kingdom) Toby Samuel (second round)
4. (Hungary) Zsombor Piros (first round)
5. (United States) Martin Damm (final)
6. (Finland) Otto Virtanen (semifinals)
7. (Japan) Shintaro Mochizuki (first round)
8. (United States) Nishesh Basavareddy (first round)

== Draw ==
Key

- Q = Qualifier
- WC = Wild card
- LL = Lucky loser
- Alt = Alternate
- ITF = ITF entry
- PR = Protected ranking
- SR = Special ranking
- SE = Special exempt
- JE = Junior exempt
- JR = Junior Accelerator Programme entrant
- CO = College Accelerator Programme entrant
- NG = Next Gen Accelerator Program entrant
- w/o = Walkover
- r = Retired
- d = Defaulted

=== Finals ===
Semifinals
(France) Moïse Kouamé	6	6
6	(Finland) Otto Virtanen	1	2
5	(United States) Martin Damm	6	6^{7}	7
2	(Croatia) Dino Prižmić	4	7^{9}	5

Final
(France) Moïse Kouamé	6	6^{5}	7^{7}
5	(United States) Martin Damm	4	7^{7}	6^{4}

=== Top half ===
First round
1	(France) H Gaston	6^{4}	7^{7}	6
(Estonia) D Glinka	7^{7}	6^{5}	1
Alt	(France) H Grenier	4	6^{1}
(France) M Kouamé	6	7^{7}
Q	(Tunisia) M Echargui	6^{3}	3
(Italy) F Maestrelli	7^{7}	6
(Canada) G Diallo	6	7
8	(United States) N Basavareddy	3	5
4	(Hungary) Z Piros	2	4
(Serbia) L Djere	6	6
(Italy) S Travaglia	6^{3}	7^{8}	7^{7}
WC	(France) P-H Herbert	7^{7}	6^{6}	6^{5}
Q	(France) M Bobichon	7^{7}	6
Q	(Belgium) M Geerts	6^{3}	3
WC	(France) M Martineau	6^{4}	4
6	(Finland) O Virtanen	7^{7}	6

Second round
1	(France) H Gaston	5	1^{r}
(France) M Kouamé	7	2
(Italy) F Maestrelli	6	2
(Canada) G Diallo	4	2^{r}
(Serbia) L Djere	5	2
(Italy) S Travaglia	7	6
Q	(France) M Bobichon	6^{1}	4
6	(Finland) O Virtanen	7^{7}	6

Quarterfinals
(France) M Kouamé	6	6
(Italy) F Maestrelli	3	4
(Italy) S Travaglia	6^{4}	4
6	(Finland) O Virtanen	7^{7}	6

Semifinals
(France) M Kouamé	6	6
6	(Finland) O Virtanen	1	2

=== Bottom half ===
First round
5	(United States) M Damm	6	6
(France) S Gueymard Wayenburg	4	4
WC	(France) F Balshaw	6	3	4
Q	(France) U Blanchet	3	6	6
(France) C Tabur	6	6
SE	(Italy) F Romano	3	4
(Spain) I Montes de la Torre	4	3
3	(United Kingdom) T Samuel	6	6
7	(Japan) S Mochizuki	0	6	3
(Italy) F Cinà	6	4	6
LL	(Switzerland) K Feldbausch	7^{8}	3	4
(Norway) N Budkov Kjær	6^{6}	6	6
Q	(France) T Paris	7^{7}	4	4
(Croatia) B Gojo	6^{5}	6	6
Q	(France) Robin Catry	4	3
2	(Croatia) D Prižmić	6	6

Second round
5	(United States) M Damm	6	7^{7}
Q	(France) U Blanchet	4	6^{4}
(France) C Tabur	7^{7}	6
3	(United Kingdom) T Samuel	6^{4}	1
(Italy) F Cinà	6	6
(Norway) N Budkov Kjær	3	3
(Croatia) B Gojo	4	3
2	(Croatia) D Prižmić	6	6

Quarterfinals
5	(United States) M Damm	7^{7}	7^{7}
(France) C Tabur	6^{5}	6^{4}
(Italy) F Cinà	4	1
2	(Croatia) D Prižmić	6	6

Semifinals
5	(United States) M Damm	6	6^{7}	7
2	(Croatia) D Prižmić	4	7^{9}	5
