= 2026 Florence Challenger =

- Date: 19 – 25 October
- Edition: 1st
- Surface: Clay
- Location: Florence, Italy

Champions

Singles
- (Italy) Filippo Romano

Doubles
- (Netherlands) Mats Hermans / (Netherlands) Max Houkes
- Florence Challenger

The 2026 Florence Challenger was a professional tennis tournament played on clay courts. It was the first edition of the tournament as part of the ATP Challenger Tour. It took place in Florence, Italy from 19 to 25 October 2026.

== Singles main-draw entrants ==
=== Seeds ===
Country	Player	Rank^{1}	Seed
CZE	Zdeněk Kolář	196	1
ITA	Lorenzo Giustino	216	2
ITA	Gianluca Cadenasso	220	3
GBR	Felix Gill	222	4
NED	Max Houkes	226	5
GBR	Henry Searle	228	6
GBR	Jay Clarke	240	7
BIH	Andrej Nedić	244	8

- ^{1} Rankings are as of 5 October 2026.

=== Other entrants ===
The following players received wildcards into the singles main draw:

- (Italy) Massimo Giunta
- (Italy) Samuele Pieri
- (Italy) Gabriele Piraino

The following player received entry into the singles main draw through the Junior Accelerator programme:

- (Bulgaria) Ivan Ivanov

The following player received entry into the singles main draw through the Next Gen Accelerator programme:

- (Italy) Jacopo Vasamì

The following player received entry into the singles main draw as an alternate:

- (Italy) Franco Agamenone

The following players received entry from the qualifying draw:

- (Italy) Pierluigi Basile
- (Czech Republic) Matthew William Donald
- (Spain) Àlex Martí Pujolràs
- (Bulgaria) Yanaki Milev
- (Austria) Filip Misolic
- (Greece) Dimitris Sakellaridis

The following player received entry as a lucky loser:

- (Spain) Izan Almazán Valiente

== Champions ==
=== Singles ===
- (Italy) Filippo Romano def. (Italy) Michele Ribecai 6–3, 4–6, 6–2.

=== Doubles ===
- (Netherlands) Mats Hermans / (Netherlands) Max Houkes def. (Italy) Jacopo Bilardo / (Italy) Giorgio Ricca 7–5, 4–6, [10–8].
