= 2026 Open Sopra Steria de Lyon =

- Date: 8–14 June
- Edition: 10th
- Surface: Clay
- Location: Lyon, France

Champions

Singles
- (Spain) David Jordà Sanchis

Doubles
- (Thailand) Pruchya Isaro / (India) Niki Kaliyanda Poonacha
- Open Sopra Steria de Lyon

The 2026 Open Sopra Steria de Lyon was a professional tennis tournament played on clay courts. It was the 10th edition of the tournament which was part of the 2026 ATP Challenger Tour. It took place in Lyon, France, between 8 and 14 June 2026.

== Singles main-draw entrants ==
=== Seeds ===
Country	Player	Rank^{1}	Seed
ARG	Marco Trungelliti	81	1
FRA	Luca Van Assche	100	2
LTU	Vilius Gaubas	133	3
ESP	Pedro Martínez	140	4
FRA	Clément Tabur	171	5
USA	Tristan Boyer	199	6
BEL	Kimmer Coppejans	206	7
ITA	Lorenzo Giustino	209	8

- ^{1} Rankings are as of 25 May 2026.

=== Other entrants ===
The following players received wildcards into the singles main draw:

- (France) Felix Balshaw
- (France) Thomas Faurel
- (France) Mickael Kaouk

The following players received entry into the singles main draw as alternates:

- (France) Robin Bertrand
- (United States) Dali Blanch
- (Spain) Daniel Rincón

The following players received entry from the qualifying draw:

- (Spain) Max Alcalá Gurri
- Svyatoslav Gulin
- (France) Matteo Martineau
- (France) Raphael Perot
- (Spain) Alejo Sánchez Quílez
- (Switzerland) Luca Stäheli

The following player received entry as a lucky loser:

- (Spain) David Jordà Sanchis

== Champions ==
=== Singles ===
- (Spain) David Jordà Sanchis def. (France) Felix Balshaw 6–4, 7–6^{(7–4)}.

=== Doubles ===
- (Thailand) Pruchya Isaro / (India) Niki Kaliyanda Poonacha def. (Tunisia) Skander Mansouri / (Austria) Maximilian Neuchrist 6–0, 6–1.
