= Moïse Kouamé =

French tennis player (born 2009)

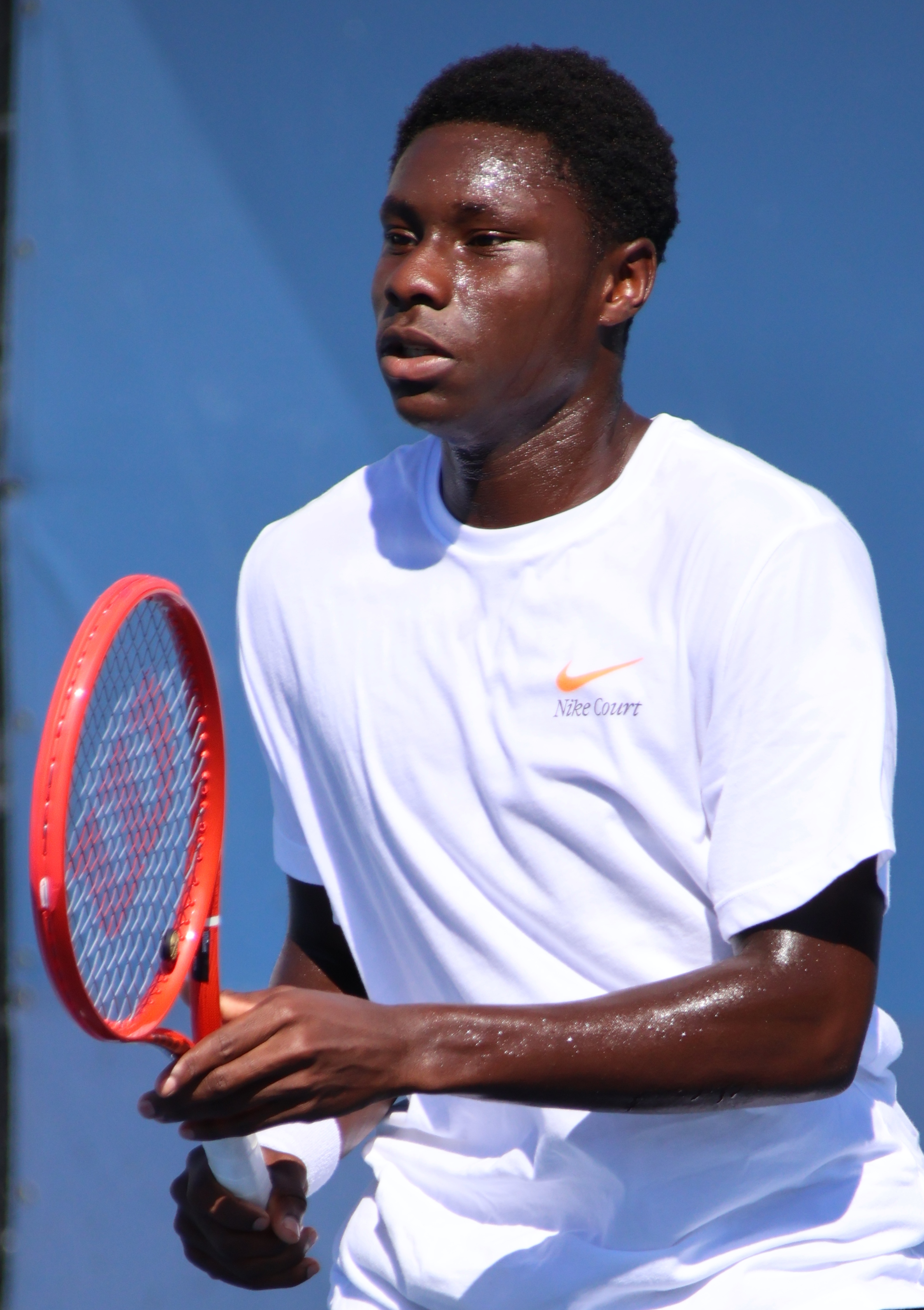
- Kouamé at the 2026 US Open
- Country (sports): France
- Born: 6 March 2009 (age 17) Sarcelles, France
- Height: 1.91 m (6 ft 3 in)
- Turned pro: 2025
- Plays: Right-handed (two handed backhand)
- Coach: Richard Gasquet, Liam Smith
- Prize money: US $522,394

Singles
- Career record: 4–8 (at ATP Tour level, Grand Slam level, and in Davis Cup)
- Career titles: 0
- Highest ranking: No. 132 (2 November 2026)
- Current ranking: No. 134 (16 November 2026)

Grand Slam singles results
- French Open: 3R (2026)
- US Open: Q1 (2026)

Doubles
- Career record: 0–2 (at ATP Tour level, Grand Slam level, and in Davis Cup)
- Career titles: 0
- Highest ranking: No. 946 (18 November 2024)
- Current ranking: No. 1,544 (2 November 2026)

Grand Slam doubles results
- French Open: 1R (2025, 2026)
- Last updated on: 10 November 2026.

Moïse Kouamé (born 6 March 2009) is a French tennis player. He has a career-high ATP singles ranking of No. 132 achieved on 2 November 2026 and a doubles ranking of No. 946 achieved on 18 November 2024.

== Early life ==
Kouamé was born in Sarcelles, France, a suburb of Paris. He started taking tennis lessons in his early childhood, at the age of five, later joining the CREPS de Poitiers.

At the age of 13, he left Poitiers to join the Justine Henin Academy in Ottignies-Louvain-la-Neuve, Belgium. He also trained at the Mouratoglou Tennis Academy in Biot and the Tennis Club du Perreux in Le Perreux-sur-Marne.

== Junior career ==
In January 2023, Kouamé and Slovenian Svit Suljić won the boys' doubles title at the Petits As, defeating Czech pair Tomáš Krejčí and Jakub Kusý in the final. In January 2024, he won a J100-level junior event in Chandigarh, India, defeating Korean Seo Hyeon-seok in the final. Later that season, he reached the boys' singles quarterfinals at the 2024 French Open. In December, he was a runner-up at the prestigious Orange Bowl, where he lost to Andrés Santamarta Roig.

Kouamé had good results on the ITF junior circuit, with a 74–38 singles win-loss record and reached an ITF junior combined ranking of No. 14 on 17 March 2025.

== Professional career ==
=== 2024: Turned Pro ===
In October, Kouamé made his professional debut at the Open Saint-Brieuc as a wildcard, but lost to compatriot Jules Marie in the first round. Later that month, he received a wildcard into the qualifying competition of the Brest Challenger and defeated Denis Yevseyev in the first round, but ultimately failed to advance into the singles main draw. In the doubles main draw, he and compatriot Tristan Lamasine reached the semifinals as wildcards.

=== 2025: First pro title ===
In March, Kouamé reached his first professional final at the M15 Sharm El Sheikh, a Futures-level event, but lost to top seed Robert Strombachs. In April, he received a wildcard into the qualifying competition of the Madrid Open.

He also received a wildcard into the qualifying competition and a main draw wildcard for his Grand Slam doubles debut with Arthur Géa at the French Open. In December, he won his first pro title at the M15 Monastir, in the doubles category partnering Italian Tommaso Pedretti.

=== 2026: Major, ATP and top 150 debuts, Maiden Challenger title ===
In January 2026, Kouamé won his first singles title, at the M25 Hazebrouck. He defeated compatriot Théo Papamalamis in the final to become the first player born in 2009 to win a pro tournament. The following week, he won his second singles title, at the M15 Bressuire, defeating Belgian Pierre-Yves Bailly in straight sets.

Kouamé received a wildcard in the qualifying draw at the 2026 Open Occitanie. He then reached the main draw with wins over sixth seed Elias Ymer and compatriot Clément Chidekh. With this feat, Kouamé became the youngest qualifier to play an ATP Tour match since Rafael Nadal in 2003, and the sixth-youngest this century (since 2000). He lost in the first round to eight seed and 2025 runner-up Aleksandar Kovacevic.

Kouamé reached his first Challenger semifinal in Lille, and entered the top 400 on 23 February 2026. He lost to Luca Van Assche in the semifinal.

In March, Kouamé made his Masters 1000 debut at the Miami Open after receiving a wildcard for the main draw. He recorded his first ATP Tour win by defeating qualifier Zachary Svajda in the first round. With this result, he became the youngest player to win a Masters 1000 match since Rafael Nadal at the Hamburg Open in 2003. He also became the first player born in 2009 or later to win an ATP Tour match. The French man lost in the second round to 21st seed Jiří Lehečka.

At the 2026 French Open, having received a wildcard, Kouamé defeated Marin Čilić in the first round, making him the youngest man to reach a Grand Slam second round since Bernard Tomic in 2009. He defeated Adolfo Daniel Vallejo in the second round, becoming the youngest player to reach a Grand Slam third round since Mirra Andreeva in 2023 and the youngest male player to do so since Rafael Nadal at Wimbledon in 2003. He lost in the third round against Chilean player Alejandro Tabilo.

In October, Kouamé won his maiden Challenger title at the Brest Open, defeating Martin Damm in the final. As a result, he entered the top 150 on 2 November 2026.

== Personal life ==
Kouamé is of Ivorian descent through his father and Cameroonian descent through his mother. His older brother, Michaël, is also a tennis player.

Kouamé's idol is Novak Djokovic. He also wanted to be a Formula One driver.

== Performance timeline ==
Key
W	F	SF	QF	#R	RR	Q#	DNQ	A	NH

(W) winner; (F) finalist; (SF) semifinalist; (QF) quarterfinalist; (#R) rounds 4, 3, 2, 1; (RR) round-robin stage; (Q#) qualification round; (DNQ) did not qualify; (A) absent; (NH) not held; (SR) strike rate (events won / competed); (W–L) win–loss record.
To avoid confusion and double counting, these charts are updated at the conclusion of a tournament or when the player's participation has ended.

=== Singles ===
Current through the 2026 US Open.

Tournament	2025	2026	SR	W–L	Win%
Grand Slam tournaments
Australian Open	A	A	0 / 0	0–0	–
French Open	Q1	3R	0 / 1	2–1	67%
Wimbledon	A	A	0 / 0	0–0	–
US Open	A	Q1	0 / 0	0–0	–
Win–loss	0–0	2–1	0 / 1	2–1	67%
ATP 1000 tournaments
Indian Wells Open	A	A	0 / 0	0–0	–
Miami Open	A	2R	0 / 1	1–1	50%
Monte-Carlo Masters	A	1R	0 / 1	0–1	0%
Madrid Open	Q1	Q1	0 / 0	0–0	–
Italian Open	A	A	0 / 0	0–0	–
Canadian Open	A	A	0 / 0	0–0	–
Cincinnati Open	A	A	0 / 0	0–0	–
Shanghai Masters	A	A	0 / 0	0–0	–
Paris Masters	A	1R	0 / 1	0–1	0%
Win–loss	0–0	1–3	0 / 3	1–3	25%
Career statistics
Tournaments	0	4	Career total: 4		
Titles	0	0	Career total: 0		
Finals	0	0	Career total: 0		
Hard win–loss	0–0	1–2	0 / 2	1–2	33%
Clay win–loss	0–0	2–2	0 / 2	2–2	50%
Grass win–loss	0–0	0–0	0 / 0	0–0	–
Overall win–loss	0–0	3–4	0 / 4	3–4	43%
Win %	–	43%	43%		
Year-end ranking (Note: 2024: ATP ranking–1597)	876		$175,637		

== ATP Challenger finals ==
=== Singles: 1 (1 title) ===
Legend ATP Challenger Tour (1–0)	Finals by surface Hard (1–0) Clay (0–0)

Result	W–L	Date	Tournament	Tier	Surface	Opponent	Score
Win	1–0	Oct 2026	Brest Challenger, France	Challenger	Hard (i)	(United States) Martin Damm	6–4, 6–7^{(5–7)}, 7–6^{(7–4)}

== ITF World Tennis Tour finals ==
=== Singles: 4 (3 titles, 1 runner-up) ===
Legend ITF WTT (3–1)	Finals by surface Hard (2–1) Clay (1–0)

Result	W–L	Date	Tournament	Tier	Surface	Opponent	Score
Loss	0–1	Mar 2025	M15 Sharm El Sheikh, Egypt	WTT	Hard	(Latvia) Robert Strombachs	3–6, 2–6
Win	1–1	Jan 2026	M25 Hazebrouck, France	WTT	Hard (i)	(France) Théo Papamalamis	7–6^{(7–5)}, 6–1
Win	2–1	Jan 2026	M15 Bressuire, France	WTT	Hard (i)	(Belgium) Pierre-Yves Bailly	6–1, 6–4
Win	3–1	Apr 2026	M25 Santa Margherita di Pula, Italy	WTT	Clay	(Italy) Juan Cruz Martin Manzano	6–3, 4–6, 6–3

=== Doubles: 1 (title) ===
Legend ITF WTT (1–0)

Result	W–L	Date	Tournament	Tier	Surface	Partner	Opponents	Score
Win	1–0	Dec 2025	M15 Monastir, Tunisia	WTT	Hard	(Italy) Tommaso Pedretti	(France) Felix Balshaw (Romania) Mihai Alexandru Coman	7–5, 6–1
