= 2026 Bosphorus Challenger Cup =

- Date: 18 – 23 May
- Edition: 1st
- Surface: Clay
- Location: Istanbul, Turkey

Champions

Singles
- (Spain) David Jordà Sanchis

Doubles
- (United States) George Goldhoff / (United States) Theodore Winegar
- Bosphorus Challenger Cup

The 2026 Haier Bosphorus Challenger Cup was a professional tennis tournament played on clay courts. It was the first edition of the tournament which was part of the 2026 ATP Challenger Tour. It took place in Istanbul, Turkey between 18 and 23 May 2026.

== Singles main-draw entrants ==
=== Seeds ===
Country	Player	Rank^{1}	Seed
ESP	Pol Martín Tiffon	237	1
ESP	Nikolás Sánchez Izquierdo	244	2
BIH	Andrej Nedić	267	3
ROU	Filip Cristian Jianu	272	4
ITA	Franco Agamenone	273	5
USA	Andres Martin	277	6
CZE	Hynek Bartoň	285	7
CZE	Jonáš Forejtek	286	8

- ^{1} Rankings are as of 4 May 2026.

=== Other entrants ===
The following players received wildcards into the singles main draw:

- (Turkey) Tuncay Duran
- (Turkey) Mert Naci Türker
- (Turkey) Kerem Yılmaz

The following player received entry into the singles main draw through the Junior Accelerator programme:

- (France) Yannick Theodor Alexandrescou

The following players received entry into the singles main draw as alternates:

- (Spain) David Jordà Sanchis
- (Spain) Carlos Sánchez Jover
- (Kazakhstan) Denis Yevseyev

The following players received entry from the qualifying draw:

- (United States) Alafia Ayeni
- (Ukraine) Georgii Kravchenko
- (United Kingdom) Anton Matusevich
- (France) Lucas Poullain
- (Spain) Alejo Sánchez Quílez
- (Brazil) Paulo André Saraiva dos Santos

The following player received entry as a lucky loser:

- (Brazil) Daniel Dutra da Silva

== Champions ==
=== Singles ===
- (Spain) David Jordà Sanchis def. (Bosnia and Herzegovina) Andrej Nedić 6–4, 6–4.

=== Doubles ===
- (United States) George Goldhoff / (United States) Theodore Winegar def. (Czech Republic) Filip Duda / (Serbia) Stefan Latinović 7–5, 6–2.
