= Bosphorus Challenger Cup =

- 2026 Bosphorus Challenger Cup

ATP Challenger Tour
- Event name: Haier Bosphorus Challenger Cup
- Location: İstinye / Istanbul, Turkey
- Venue: TTF Istanbul Tennis Training Center (TTF İstanbul Tenis Eğitim Merkezi)
- Category: ATP Challenger Tour
- Surface: Clay
- Website: website

The Haier Bosphorus Challenger Cup is a professional tennis tournament played on clay courts. It is currently part of the ATP Challenger Tour. It is held in İstinye, Istanbul, Turkey.

== Past finals ==
=== Singles ===
Year	Champion	Runner-up	Score
2026	(Spain) David Jordà Sanchis	(Bosnia and Herzegovina) Andrej Nedić	6–4, 6–4

=== Doubles ===
Year	Champions	Runners-up	Score
2026	(United States) George Goldhoff (United States) Theodore Winegar	(Czech Republic) Filip Duda (Serbia) Stefan Latinović	7–5, 6–2

== See also ==
- İstanbul Open, a WTA 125 Challenger event held also in İstinye at the same venue in May
