= 2025 INTARO Open =

- Date: 8–14 September
- Edition: 1st
- Surface: Clay
- Location: Târgu Mureș, Romania

Champions

Singles
- (Argentina) Marco Trungelliti

Doubles
- (Austria) Neil Oberleitner / (Croatia) Mili Poljičak
- INTARO Open

The 2025 INTARO Open was a professional tennis tournament played on clay courts. It was the first edition of the tournament which was part of the 2025 ATP Challenger Tour. It took place in Târgu Mureș, Romania between 8 and 14 September 2025.

== Singles main-draw entrants ==
=== Seeds ===
Country	Player	Rank^{1}	Seed
ARG	Marco Trungelliti	183	1
GBR	Jay Clarke	201	2
ROU	Filip Cristian Jianu	267	3
ESP	Nicolás Álvarez Varona	282	4
FRA	Mathys Erhard	283	5
ESP	Daniel Rincón	287	6
CRO	Mili Poljičak	304	7
FRA	Corentin Denolly	310	8

^{1} Rankings are as of 25 August 2025.

=== Other entrants ===
The following players received wildcards into the singles main draw:

- (Romania) Mihai Alexandru Coman
- (Romania) Sebastian Gima
- (Romania) Dan Alexandru Tomescu

The following players received entry from the qualifying draw:

- (Romania) Ștefan Adrian Andreescu
- (Romania) Cezar Crețu
- (Belgium) Émilien Demanet
- (Spain) Imanol López Morillo
- (Romania) Ștefan Paloși
- (Romania) Radu Mihai Papoe

== Champions ==
=== Singles ===
- (Argentina) Marco Trungelliti def. (Croatia) Mili Poljičak 6–1, 0–0 ret.

=== Doubles ===
- (Austria) Neil Oberleitner / (Croatia) Mili Poljičak def. (Romania) Alexandru Cristian Dumitru / (Romania) Dan Alexandru Tomescu 6–0, 6–3.
