= David Jordà Sanchis =

Spanish tennis player (born 1994)

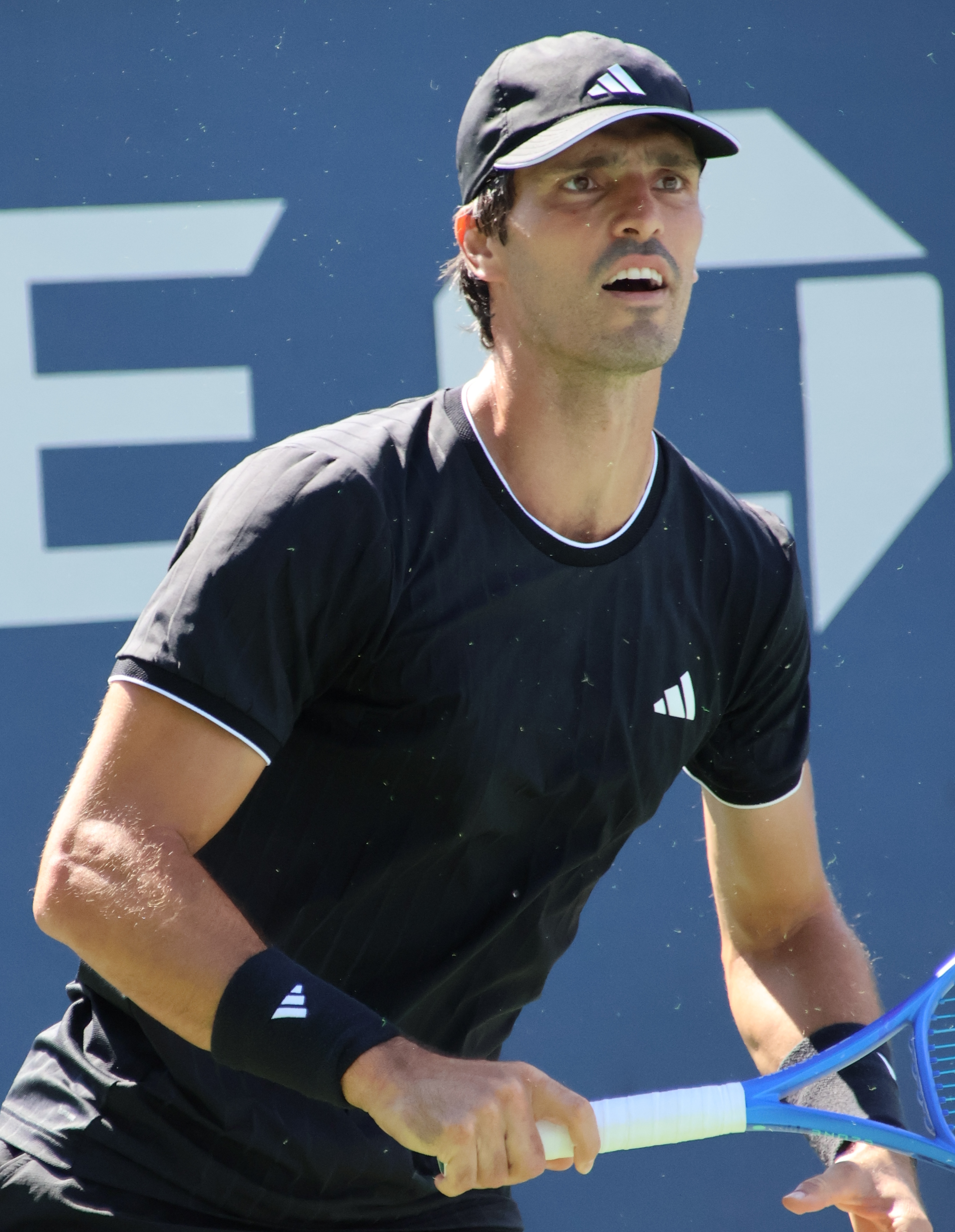
- Jordà Sanchis at the 2026 US Open
- Country (sports): Spain
- Born: 14 June 1994 (age 32) Barcelona, Spain
- Height: 1.98 m (6 ft 6 in)
- Plays: Right-handed (two-handed backhand)
- Coach: Álex López Morón
- Prize money: US $240,267

Singles
- Career record: 1–1
- Career titles: 0
- Highest ranking: No. 184 (29 June 2026)
- Current ranking: No. 184 (29 June 2026)

Grand Slam singles results
- US Open: Q2 (2026)

Doubles
- Career record: 0–0
- Career titles: 0
- Highest ranking: No. 389 (16 September 2024)
- Current ranking: No. 1,011 (29 June 2026)
- Last updated on: 29 June 2026.

David Jordà Sanchis (born 14 June 1994) is a Spanish professional tennis player. He has a career-high ATP singles ranking of No. 184 achieved on 29 June 2026 and a doubles ranking of No. 389 achieved on 16 September 2024.

Jordà Sanchis achieved most of his career milestones after the age of 30.

== Career ==
=== 2024: ATP Tour debut, first win, top 300 ===
Ranked No. 329, at 29 years old, Jordà Sanchis made his ATP main draw debut at the 2024 Estoril Open after entering the singles main draw as a lucky loser following the withdrawal of Constant Lestienne. He defeated qualifier Jaime Faria to record his first win on the ATP Tour. He lost again to compatriot and qualifier Pablo Llamas Ruiz to whom he had lost also in the last round of qualifying. As a result he reached the top 300 in the rankings at No. 298 on 8 April 2024.

=== 2026: Maiden Challenger title, top 200 ===
In May, Jordà Sanchis won his first Challenger singles title at the Bosphorus Challenger Cup, defeating Andrej Nedić in the final.

In June, Jordà Sanchis won his second Challenger singles title at the Open Sopra Steria, as a Lucky Loser, defeating Félix Balshaw in the final. He reached the top 200 as a result.

== ATP Challenger Tour finals ==
=== Singles: 2 (2 titles) ===
Legend ATP Challenger Tour (2–0)	Finals by surface Hard (–) Clay (2–0)

Result	W–L	Date	Tournament	Tier	Surface	Opponent	Score
Win	1–0	May 2026	Bosphorus Challenger, Turkey	Challenger	Clay	(Bosnia and Herzegovina) Andrej Nedić	6–4, 6–4
Win	2–0	Jun 2026	Open Sopra Steria, France	Challenger	Clay	(France) Felix Balshaw	6–4, 7–6^{(7–4)}

== Performance timeline ==
Key
W	F	SF	QF	#R	RR	Q#	DNQ	A	NH

(W) winner; (F) finalist; (SF) semifinalist; (QF) quarterfinalist; (#R) rounds 4, 3, 2, 1; (RR) round-robin stage; (Q#) qualification round; (DNQ) did not qualify; (A) absent; (NH) not held; (SR) strike rate (events won / competed); (W–L) win–loss record.

=== Singles ===
Tournament	2026	SR	W–L	Win%
Grand Slam tournaments
Australian Open	A	0 / 0	0–0	–
French Open	A	0 / 0	0–0	–
Wimbledon	A	0 / 0	0–0	–
US Open		0 / 0	0–0	–
Win–loss	0–0	0 / 0	0–0	–
