= Florence Challenger =

Florence Open
- 2026 Florence Challenger

ATP Challenger Tour
- Location: Florence, Italy
- Category: ATP Challenger Tour
- Surface: Clay

The Florence Challenger, known as the Florence Open, is a professional tennis tournament played on clay courts. It is currently part of the ATP Challenger Tour. It is held in Florence, Italy.

== Past finals ==
=== Singles ===
Year	Champion	Runner-up	Score
2026	(Italy) Filippo Romano	(Italy) Michele Ribecai	6–3, 4–6, 6–2

=== Doubles ===
Year	Champions	Runners-up	Score
2026	(Netherlands) Mats Hermans (Netherlands) Max Houkes	(Italy) Jacopo Bilardo (Italy) Giorgio Ricca	7–5, 4–6, [10–8]
