= Dominik Reček =

Czech tennis player (born 1995)

- Country (sports): Czech Republic
- Born: 19 February 1995 (age 31) Prague, Czech Republic
- Height: 1.91 m (6 ft 3 in)
- Plays: Right-handed (two-handed backhand)
- Prize money: US $52,085

Singles
- Career record: 0–0 (at ATP Tour level, Grand Slam level, and in Davis Cup)
- Career titles: 0
- Highest ranking: No. 819 (5 October 2026)
- Current ranking: No. 819 (5 October 2026)

Doubles
- Career record: 0–0 (at ATP Tour level, Grand Slam level, and in Davis Cup)
- Career titles: 1 Challenger, 5 ITF
- Highest ranking: No. 189 (14 September 2026)
- Current ranking: No. 204 (5 October 2026)
- Last updated on: 6 October 2026.

Dominik Reček (born 19 February 1995) is a Czech tennis player. Reček has a career high ATP singles ranking of No. 819 achieved on 5 October 2026 and a career high ATP doubles ranking of No. 189 achieved on 14 September 2026.

Reček has won one ATP Challenger doubles title at the 2025 INTARO Open II.

== ATP Challenger Tour finals ==
=== Doubles: 2 (2 titles) ===
| Legend ATP Challenger Tour (2–0) |

| Result | W–L | Date | Tournament | Tier | Surface | Partner | Opponents | Score |
|---|---|---|---|---|---|---|---|---|
| Win | 1–0 | Sep 2025 | Târgu Mureș, Romania | Challenger | Hard | (Czech Republic) Daniel Siniakov | (Italy) Simone Agostini (Italy) Tommaso Compagnucci | 6–2, 5–7, [11–9] |
| Win | 2–0 | Aug 2026 | Augsburg, Germany | Challenger | Clay | (Czech Republic) Daniel Siniakov | (Argentina) Juan Manuel La Serna (Brazil) Eduardo Ribeiro | 6–2, 6–3 |
