= INTARO Open =

- 2025 INTARO Open

ATP Challenger Tour
- Location: Târgu Mureș, Romania
- Category: ATP Challenger Tour
- Surface: Clay
- Website: website

The INTARO Open is a professional tennis tournament played on clay courts. It is currently part of the ATP Challenger Tour. It was first held in Târgu Mureș, Romania in 2025 in two editions.

== Past finals ==
=== Singles ===
Year	Champion	Runner-up	Score
2026	(India) Sumit Nagal	(France) Felix Balshaw	6–3, 7–5
2025 (2)	(Italy) Franco Agamenone	(United Kingdom) Jay Clarke	6–3, 6–4
2025 (1)	(Argentina) Marco Trungelliti	(Croatia) Mili Poljičak	6–1, 0–0 ret.

=== Doubles ===
Year	Champions	Runners-up	Score
2026	(Netherlands) Thijmen Loof (Japan) Kaito Uesugi	(Serbia) Stefan Latinović (Czech Republic) Michael Vrbenský	2–6, 7–6^{(7–0)}, [10–6]
2025 (2)	(Czech Republic) Dominik Reček (Czech Republic) Daniel Siniakov	(Italy) Simone Agostini (Italy) Tommaso Compagnucci	6–2, 5–7, [11–9]
2025 (1)	(Austria) Neil Oberleitner (Croatia) Mili Poljičak	(Romania) Alexandru Cristian Dumitru (Romania) Dan Alexandru Tomescu	6–0, 6–3
