= Adrian Boitan =

Romanian tennis player

- Full name: Gabi Adrian Boitan
- Country (sports): Romania
- Born: 11 July 1999 (age 27) Constanța, Romania
- Height: 1.85 m (6 ft 1 in)
- Plays: Right-handed (two-handed backhand)
- College: Baylor University
- Prize money: US $143,586

Singles
- Career record: 2–3 (at ATP Tour level, Grand Slam level, and in Davis Cup)
- Career titles: 0
- Highest ranking: No. 284 (23 February 2026)
- Current ranking: No. 464 (19 October 2026)

Doubles
- Career record: 0–1 (at ATP Tour level, Grand Slam level, and in Davis Cup)
- Career titles: 0
- Highest ranking: No. 521 (17 July 2023)
- Current ranking: No. 1,123 (19 October 2026)

Team competitions
- Davis Cup: 1–0
- Last updated on: 19 October 2026.

Gabi Adrian Boitan (born 11 July 1999) is a Romanian tennis player. He has a career high ATP singles ranking of world No. 284 achieved on 23 February 2026 and a career high doubles ranking of No. 521 achieved on 17 July 2023. He is currently the No. 2 Romanian player. Boitan played college tennis at Baylor University.

He represents Romania at the Davis Cup, where he has a W/L record of 1–0.

== ATP Challenger and ITF Tour finals ==
=== Singles: 19 (9–10) ===
Legend ATP Challenger (0–0) ITF World Tennis Tour (9–10)	Finals by surface Hard (0–4) Clay (9–6)

Result	W–L	Date	Tournament	Tier	Surface	Opponent	Score
Loss	0–1	Sep 2021	M15 Champaign, USA	World Tennis Tour	Hard	(United States) Martin Damm	3–6, 6–3, 2–6
Loss	0–2	Nov 2021	M25 Harlingen, USA	World Tennis Tour	Hard	(United Kingdom) Paul Jubb	2–6, 6–1, 5–7
Loss	0–3	Jul 2022	M25 Dallas, USA	World Tennis Tour	Hard	(Chinese Taipei) Hsu Yu-hsiou	5–7, 3–6
Win	1–3	Feb 2023	M15 Palm Coast, USA	World Tennis Tour	Clay	(Argentina) Ignacio Monzón	6–2, 4–6, 6–1
Win	2–3	Feb 2023	M15 Weston, USA	World Tennis Tour	Clay	(United States) Christian Langmo	6–3, 6–4
Win	3–3	Feb 2023	M15 Naples, USA	World Tennis Tour	Clay	(United States) Kyle Kang	6–3, 6–1
Win	4–3	Aug 2023	M15 Curtea de Argeș, Romania	World Tennis Tour	Clay	(Romania) Radu Mihai Papoe	6–4, 6–4
Loss	4–4	Aug 2023	M15 Târgu Jiu, Romania	World Tennis Tour	Clay	(Romania) Dan Alexandru Tomescu	6–2, 3–6, 2–6
Win	5–4	May 2024	M15 Bucharest, Romania	World Tennis Tour	Clay	(Romania) Ioan Alexandru Chiriță	6–7^{(5–7)}, 6–0, 6–2
Win	6–4	May 2024	M15 Constanta, Romania	World Tennis Tour	Clay	(Moldova) Ilya Snițari	6–2, 6–4
Loss	6–5	Jun 2024	M15 Oradea, Romania	World Tennis Tour	Clay	(Romania) Cezar Crețu	6–7^{(4–7)}, 4–6
Loss	6–6	Mar 2025	M25 Quinta do Lago, Portugal	World Tennis Tour	Hard	(United Kingdom) George Loffhagen	3–6, 4–6
Loss	6–7	Mar 2025	M15 Alaminos, Cyprus	World Tennis Tour	Clay	(Romania) Nicholas David Ionel	6–7^{(3–7)}, 3–6
Loss	6–8	May 2025	M15 Bucharest, Romania	World Tennis Tour	Clay	(Bulgaria) Petr Nesterov	4–6, 4–6
Win	7–8	May 2025	M25 Satu Mare, Romania	World Tennis Tour	Clay	(Spain) Alex Marti Pujolras	6–4, 6–3
Win	8–8	Jul 2025	M25 Pitești, Romania	World Tennis Tour	Clay	(Uruguay) Franco Roncadelli	7–6^{(7–1)}, 6–3
Win	9–8	Feb 2026	M25 Antalya, Turkey	World Tennis Tour	Clay	(Spain) Max Alcalá Gurri	6–4, 7–6^{(7–1)}
Loss	9–9	Jun 2026	M25 Constanța, Romania	World Tennis Tour	Clay	(Romania) Dan Alexandru Tomescu	6–4, 3–6, 0–3 ret.
Loss	9–10	Oct 2026	M25 Slobozia, Romania	World Tennis Tour	Clay	(Romania) Sebastian Gima	3–6, 4–6
