= Mika Brunold =

Swiss tennis player (born 2004)

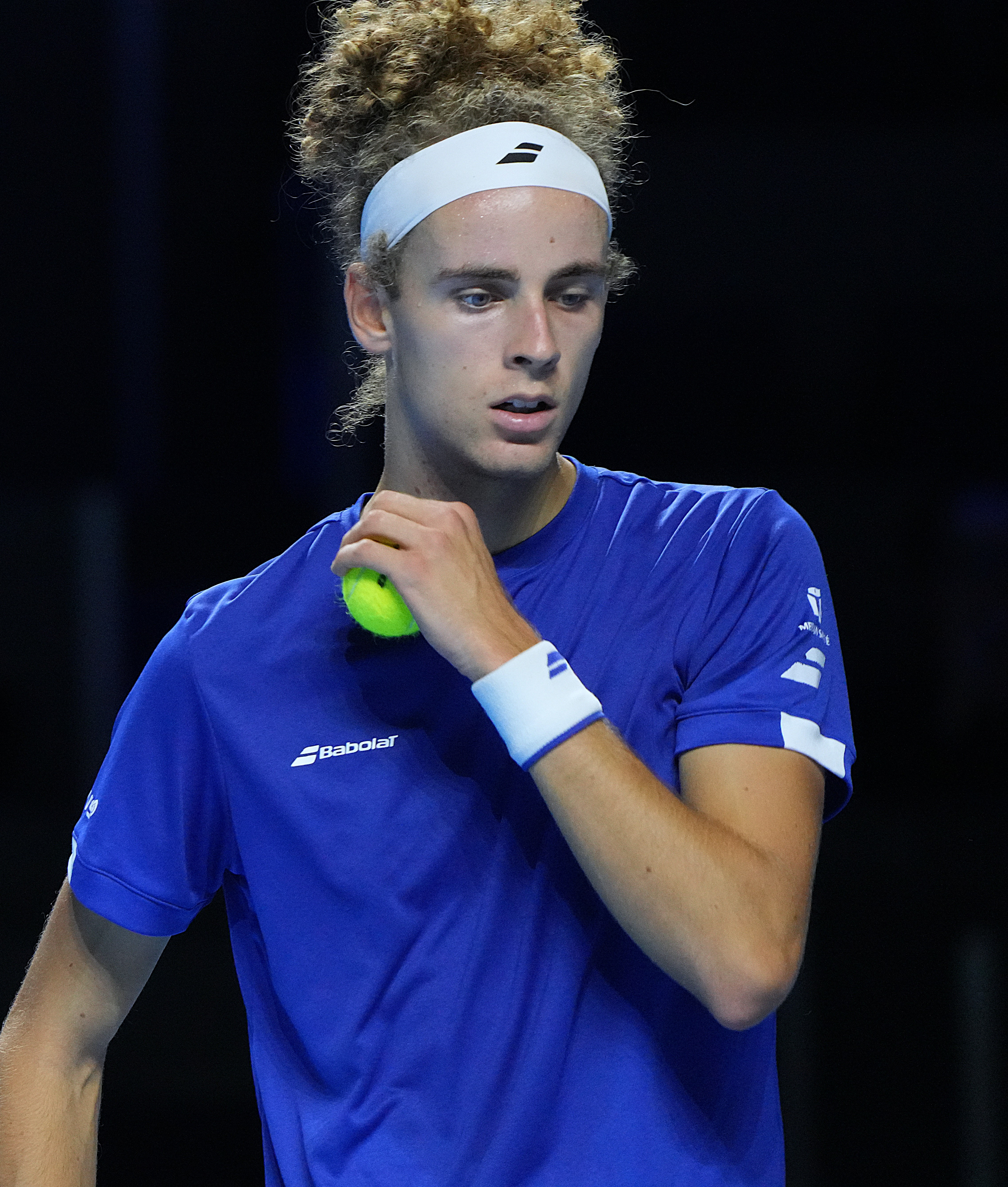
- Mika Brunold, ATP Basel 2024
- Country (sports): Switzerland
- Born: 2 October 2004 (age 22) Winterthur, Switzerland
- Height: 1.91 m (6 ft 3 in)
- Plays: Right-handed (two-handed backhand)
- Coach: Roland Burtscher, Henri Laaksonen (2024), Gianluca Carbone
- Prize money: US $221,646

Singles
- Career record: 1–1 (at ATP Tour level, Grand Slam level, and in Davis Cup)
- Career titles: 0
- Highest ranking: No. 178 (16 November 2026)
- Current ranking: No. 178 (16 November 2026)

Doubles
- Career record: 0–2 (at ATP Tour level, Grand Slam level, and in Davis Cup)
- Career titles: 0
- Highest ranking: No. 1,021 (10 June 2024)
- Last updated on: 16 November 2026.

Mika Brunold (born 2 October 2004) is a Swiss tennis player. He has a career high ATP singles ranking of world No. 178 achieved on 16 November 2026. He is currently the No. 2 ATP player from Switzerland.

== Career ==
=== 2023-2025: ATP doubles debut ===
Following a quarterfinal berth on his debut in a Challenger main draw in Lugano as a wildcard, Brunold reached the top 750 after a rise of more than 150 positions to world No. 725 on 20 March 2023. Brunold made his ATP main draw doubles debut at the 2023 Swiss Open Gstaad after receiving a wildcard into the doubles main draw with Kilian Feldbausch. He also received a wildcard for the qualifying competition of the 2023 Swiss Indoors in singles and for the main draw in doubles with Marc-Andrea Hüsler.

He received a wildcard for the 2024 Swiss Indoors qualifying competition, where he lost to James Duckworth. He received a wildcard for the 2025 Swiss Indoors qualifying competition, but lost to Reilly Opelka, unable to capitalize on six match points.

=== 2026: Challenger title, top 200 ===
In September, Brunold won his maiden Challenger singles title as a qualifier at the 2026 NÖ Open, defeating João Lucas Reis da Silva in the final. In October, Brunold won his second Challenger title at the Open de Roanne, defeating world No. 92 Benjamin Bonzi in the round of 16 and Matteo Martineau in the final. As a result, he entered the top 200 in 19 October 2026. Brunold would score another top 100 win at the Swiss Indoors against #56 Jaime Faria in the first round of qualifying.

== Personal life ==
In November 2025, Brunold came out as gay in a post on his Instagram account.

== ATP Challenger Tour finals ==
=== Singles: 2 (2 titles) ===
| Legend ATP Challenger Tour (2–0) | Finals by surface Clay (1–0) Hard (1–0) |

| Result | W–L | Date | Tournament | Tier | Surface | Opponent | Score |
|---|---|---|---|---|---|---|---|
| Win | 1–0 | Sep 2026 | NÖ Open, Austria | Challenger | Clay | (Brazil) João Lucas Reis da Silva | 6–4, 6–3 |
| Win | 2–0 | Oct 2026 | Open de Roanne, France | Challenger | Hard (i) | (France) Matteo Martineau | 2–6, 7–6^{(7–5)}, 6–1 |

== ITF Tour finals ==
=== Singles: 5 (4 titles, 1 runner-up) ===
| Legend ITF WTT (4–1) | Finals by surface Hard (0–0) Clay (4–1) |

| Result | W–L | Date | Tournament | Tier | Surface | Opponent | Score |
|---|---|---|---|---|---|---|---|
| Win | 1–0 | Aug 2023 | M15 Caslano, Switzerland | WTT | Clay | (Italy) Andrea Picchione | 6–3, 6–2 |
| Win | 2–0 | May 2024 | M15 Antalya, Turkey | WTT | Clay | (Germany) Marlon Vankan | 5–7, 6–4, 6–0 |
| Loss | 2–1 | Jun 2024 | M15 Hrastnik, Slovenia | WTT | Clay | (Germany) Luca Wiedenmann | 4–6, 6–1, 4–6 |
| Win | 3–1 | Aug 2024 | M25 Muttenz, Switzerland | WTT | Clay | Marat Sharipov | 7–5, 6–4 |
| Win | 4–1 | Nov 2024 | M25 Antalya, Turkey | WTT | Clay | (Norway) Nicolai Budkov Kjær | 6–2, 7–6^{(9–7)} |

=== Doubles: 1 (1 title) ===
| Legend ITF WTT (1–0) |

| Result | W–L | Date | Tournament | Tier | Surface | Partner | Opponents | Score |
|---|---|---|---|---|---|---|---|---|
| Win | 1–0 | Jun 2023 | M15 Duffel, Belgium | WTT | Clay | (Switzerland) Jakub Paul | (Belgium) Buvaysar Gadamauri (Georgia (country)) Zura Tkemaladze | 6–2, 4–6, [10–3] |
