= Daniel Siniakov =

Czech tennis player (born 2003)

- Country (sports): Czech Republic
- Born: 15 January 2003 (age 23) Hradec Králové, Czech Republic
- Height: 1.83 m (6 ft 0 in)
- Plays: Right-handed (two-handed backhand)
- Prize money: US $76,882

Singles
- Career record: 0–0 (at ATP Tour level, Grand Slam level, and in Davis Cup)
- Career titles: 0
- Highest ranking: No. 438 (13 July 2026)
- Current ranking: No. 512 (14 September 2026)

Doubles
- Career record: 0–0 (at ATP Tour level, Grand Slam level, and in Davis Cup)
- Career titles: 1 Challenger, 5 ITF
- Highest ranking: No. 183 (14 September 2026)
- Current ranking: No. 183 (14 September 2026)
- Last updated on: 14 September 2026.

Daniel Siniakov (born 15 January 2003) is a Czech tennis player. Siniakov has a career high ATP singles ranking of No. 438 achieved on 13 July 2026 and a career high ATP doubles ranking of No. 183 achieved on 14 September 2026.

Siniakov has won one ATP Challenger doubles title at the 2025 INTARO Open II.

Daniel is younger brother of Grand Slam champion and world No. 1 player Kateřina Siniaková.

== ATP Challenger and ITF Tour finals ==
=== Singles: 1 title ===
Legend ATP Challenger (0–0) ITF Futures (1–0)	Finals by surface Hard (1–0) Clay (0–0)

Result	W–L	Date	Tournament	Tier	Surface	Opponent	Score
Win	1–0	April 2026	M25 Sharm El Sheikh, Egypt	World Tennis Tour	Hard	Grigory Shebekin	6–0, 6-3

=== Doubles: 2 (2 titles) ===
Legend ATP Challenger Tour (2–0)

Result	W–L	Date	Tournament	Tier	Surface	Partner	Opponents	Score
Win	1–0	Sep 2025	Târgu Mureș, Romania	Challenger	Hard	(Czech Republic) Dominik Reček	(Italy) Simone Agostini (Italy) Tommaso Compagnucci	6–2, 5–7, [11–9]
Win	2–0	Aug 2026	Augsburg, Germany	Challenger	Clay	(Czech Republic) Dominik Reček	(Argentina) Juan Manuel La Serna (Brazil) Eduardo Ribeiro	6–2, 6–3
