= Felix Balshaw =

French tennis player (born 2006)

- Country (sports): France
- Born: 15 June 2006 (age 20) Leeds, United Kingdom
- Height: 1.91 m (6 ft 3 in)
- Plays: Right-handed (one-handed backhand)
- Coach: Thomas Drouet
- Prize money: US $132,581

Singles
- Career record: 1–2 (at ATP Tour level, Grand Slam level, and in Davis Cup)
- Career titles: 0; 1 Challenger
- Highest ranking: No. 173 (16 November 2026)
- Current ranking: No. 173 (16 November 2026)

Doubles
- Career record: 0–0 (at ATP Tour level, Grand Slam level, and in Davis Cup)
- Career titles: 0
- Highest ranking: No. 399 (2 November 2026)
- Current ranking: No. 400 (16 November 2026)
- Last updated on: 16 November 2026.

Felix Balshaw (born 15 June 2006) is a British-born French tennis player. He has a career-high ATP singles ranking of No. 173 achieved on 16 November 2026 and a doubles ranking of No. 399 achieved on 2 November 2026.

== Career ==
=== 2026: Maiden Challenger title, ATP tour debut, top 200 ===
In June, Balshaw reached his first Challenger final at the Open de Lyon as a qualifier, losing to David Jordà Sanchis in the final. Two weeks later, he reached his second Challenger final at the INTARO Open, losing to Sumit Nagal in the final.

In August, Balshaw made his ATP Tour main draw debut at the 2026 Winston-Salem Open after qualifying for the singles main draw. He lost in the first round.

Later in August, Balshaw won his maiden Challenger title at the Rafa Nadal Open, defeating Iñaki Montes de la Torre in the final. He entered the top 200 as a result.

In October, Balshaw recorded his first ATP Tour win at the Lyon Open, where he received a Wild Card to the main draw. He defeating Jaime Faria in the first round to record his first top 100 win.

== Personal life ==
He is the son of former England international rugby union player Iain Balshaw. His family moved to France in 2009 after his father began playing for Biarritz Olympique and eventually settled in the coastal Basque city, where Felix Balshaw was raised.

== Performance timeline ==
Key
W	F	SF	QF	#R	RR	Q#	DNQ	A	NH

(W) winner; (F) finalist; (SF) semifinalist; (QF) quarterfinalist; (#R) rounds 4, 3, 2, 1; (RR) round-robin stage; (Q#) qualification round; (DNQ) did not qualify; (A) absent; (NH) not held; (SR) strike rate (events won / competed); (W–L) win–loss record.

=== Singles ===
Tournament	2026	2027	SR	W–L	Win%
Grand Slam tournaments
Australian Open	A		0 / 0	0–0	–
French Open	A		0 / 0	0–0	–
Wimbledon	A		0 / 0	0–0	–
US Open	A		0 / 0	0–0	–
Win–loss	0–0	0–0	0 / 0	0–0	0%
ATP 1000 tournaments
Indian Wells Open	A		0 / 0	0–0	0%
Miami Open	A		0 / 0	0–0	–
Monte-Carlo Masters	A		0 / 0	0–0	–
Madrid Open	A		0 / 0	0–0	–
Italian Open	A		0 / 0	0–0	–
Canadian Open	A		0 / 0	0–0	–
Cincinnati Open	A		0 / 0	0–0	–
Shanghai Masters	A		0 / 0	0–0	–
Paris Masters	Q1		0 / 0	0–0	–
Win–loss	0–0	0–0	0 / 0	0–0	–

== ATP Challenger Tour finals ==
=== Singles: 3 (1 title, 2 runner-ups) ===
Legend ATP Challenger (1–2)	Finals by surface Hard (1–0) Clay (0–2)

Result	W–L	Date	Tournament	Surface	Opponent	Score
Loss	0–1	Jun 2026	Open de Lyon, France	Clay	(Spain) David Jordà Sanchis	4–6, 6–7^{(4–7)}
Loss	0–2	Jun 2026	INTARO Open, Romania	Clay	(India) Sumit Nagal	3–6, 5–7
Win	1–2	Aug 2026	Rafa Nadal Open, Spain	Hard	(Spain) Iñaki Montes de la Torre	3–6, 6–2, 6–3

== ITF World Tennis Tour finals ==
=== Singles: 6 (5 titles, 1 runner-up) ===
Legend ITF World Tennis (5–1)	Finals by surface Hard (0–1) Clay (5–0)

Result	W–L	Date	Tournament	Surface	Opponent	Score
Win	1–0	Aug 2024	M15 Arad, Romania	Clay	(Hungary) Peter Fajta	4–6, 7–6^{(7–3)}, 6–3
Win	2–0	Aug 2025	M15 Bastad, Sweden	Clay	(Sweden) Nikola Slavic	4–6, 6–1, 6–1
Loss	2–1	Oct 2025	M15 Heraklion, Greece	Hard	(Ukraine) Georgii Kravchenko	7–6^{(7–2)}, 3–6, 6–7^{(7–9)}
Win	3–1	Apr 2026	M15 Dubrovnik, Croatia	Clay	(Netherlands) Sander Jong	6–4, 6–2
Win	4–1	May 2026	M15 Prijedor, Bosnia and Herzegovina	Clay	(Hungary) Attila Boros	6–2, 6–1
Win	5–1	May 2026	M25 Deauville, France	Clay	(France) Corentin Denolly	6–4, 6–1
