= Andrej Nedić =

Bosnia and Herzegovina tennis player

- Country (sports): Bosnia and Herzegovina
- Born: 16 October 2004 (age 22) Doboj, Bosnia and Herzegovina
- Height: 1.85 m (6 ft 1 in)
- Plays: Right-handed (two-handed backhand)
- Coach: Zoran Zrnic
- Prize money: US $117,918

Singles
- Career record: 2–5 (at ATP Tour level, Grand Slam level, and in Davis Cup)
- Career titles: 0
- Highest ranking: No. 235 (26 October 2026)
- Current ranking: No. 235 (26 October 2026)

Doubles
- Career record: 0–0 (at ATP Tour level, Grand Slam level, and in Davis Cup)
- Career titles: 0
- Highest ranking: No. 416 (4 May 2026)
- Current ranking: No. 736 (26 October 2026)
- Last updated on: 26 October 2026.

Andrej Nedić (born 16 October 2004) is a Bosnian tennis player. He has a career high ATP singles ranking of world No. 235 achieved on 26 October 2026 and a doubles ranking of No. 416 achieved on 4 May 2026.

He is a member of the Bosnia and Herzegovina Davis Cup team.

== Challenger and World Tennis Tour Finals ==
=== Singles: 15 (8–7) ===
Legend ATP Challenger Tour (0–1) ITF World Tennis Tour (8–6)	Finals by surface Hard (0–0) Clay (8–7) Grass (0–0) Carpet (0–0)

Result	W–L	Date	Tournament	Tier	Surface	Opponent	Score
Loss	0–1	May 2026	Bosphorus Challenger Cup, Turkey	Challenger	Clay	(Spain) David Jordà Sanchis	4–6, 4–6
Win	1–0	May 2023	M15 Prijedor, Bosnia and Herzegovina	World Tour	Clay	(Ukraine) Viacheslav Bielinskyi	6–4, 2–6, 6–1
Win	2–0	May 2023	M15 Brčko, Bosnia and Herzegovina	World Tour	Clay	(Serbia) Stefan Popović	6–4, 6–4
Loss	2–1	Jul 2023	M15 Novi Sad, Serbia	World Tour	Clay	(Slovenia) Bor Artnak	0–6, 6–7^{(2–7)}
Loss	2–2	Sep 2023	M15 Kuršumlijska Banja, Serbia	World Tour	Clay	(France) Luka Pavlovic	5–7, 1–3, ret.
Loss	2–3	Jun 2024	M15 Kuršumlijska Banja, Serbia	World Tour	Clay	(Italy) Tommaso Compagnucci	4–6, 4–6
Win	3–3	Oct 2024	M15 Bol, Croatia	World Tour	Clay	(Ukraine) Viacheslav Bielinskyi	6–3, 7–6^{(7–2)}
Loss	3–4	Feb 2025	M15 Antalya, Turkiye	World Tour	Clay	(Bosnia and Herzegovina) Nerman Fatić	2–6, 3–6
Loss	3–5	May 2025	M25 Kuršumlijska Banja, Serbia	World Tour	Clay	(Germany) Marko Topo	1–6, 6–3, 3–6
Win	4–5	May 2025	M15 Doboj, Bosnia-Herzegovina	World Tour	Clay	(Ukraine) Tymur Bieldiugin	6–1, 6–3
Win	5–5	Jun 2025	M25 Kiseljak, Bosnia-Herzegovina	World Tour	Clay	(Ukraine) Viacheslav Bielinskyi	6–4, 6–2
Loss	5–6	Jul 2025	M25 Kramsach, Austria	World Tour	Clay	(Ukraine) Vladyslav Orlov	7–5, 1–6, 1–6
Win	6–6	Oct 2025	M15 Bol, Croatia	World Tour	Clay	Svyatoslav Gulin	6–3, 6–1
Win	7–6	Oct 2025	M15 Bol, Croatia	World Tour	Clay	(Romania) Cezar Crețu	4–6, 7–5, 7–5
Win	8–6	Nov 2025	M25 Antalya, Turkey	World Tour	Clay	(Germany) Tim Handel	4–6, 6–0, 6–2
