= Miguel Damas =

Spanish tennis player (born 1999)

- Country (sports): Spain
- Born: 21 December 1999 (age 26) Madrid, Spain
- Height: 2.08 m (6 ft 10 in)
- Plays: Right-handed (two-handed backhand)
- Coach: Luis Zapata, Javi Perez
- Prize money: US $178,314

Singles
- Career record: 0–1 (at ATP Tour level, Grand Slam level, and in Davis Cup)
- Career titles: 6 ITF
- Highest ranking: No. 257 (18 May 2026)
- Current ranking: No. 326 (14 September 2026)

Doubles
- Career record: 0–0 (at ATP Tour level, Grand Slam level, and in Davis Cup)
- Career titles: 0
- Highest ranking: No. 598 (24 August 2026)
- Current ranking: No. 628 (14 September 2026)
- Last updated on: 14 September 2026.

Miguel Damas (born 21 December 1999) is a Spanish tennis player. Damas has a career high ATP singles ranking of No. 257 achieved on 18 May 2026 and a career high ATP doubles ranking of No. 598 achieved on 24 August 2026.

Damas made his ATP main draw debut at the 2026 Swedish Open after qualifying for the singles main draw.
