= 2017 Svijany Open – Doubles =

Doubles
- 2017 Svijany Open

Final
- Champions: (Lithuania) Laurynas Grigelis (Czech Republic) Zdeněk Kolář
- Runners-up: (Poland) Tomasz Bednarek (Netherlands) David Pel
- Score: 6–3, 6–4

Events
Singles	Doubles
← 2016 ·	Svijany Open	· 2018 →

Jonathan Eysseric and André Ghem were the defending champions but chose not to defend their title.

Laurynas Grigelis and Zdeněk Kolář won the title after defeating Tomasz Bednarek and David Pel 6–3, 6–4 in the final.

== Seeds ==
1. (Ukraine) Denys Molchanov / (Slovakia) Igor Zelenay (quarterfinals)
2. (Germany) Gero Kretschmer / (Germany) Andreas Mies (semifinals)
3. (Poland) Tomasz Bednarek / (Netherlands) David Pel (final)
4. (Lithuania) Laurynas Grigelis / (Czech Republic) Zdeněk Kolář (champions)

== Draw ==
=== Key ===
- Q = Qualifier
- WC = Wild card
- LL = Lucky loser
- Alt = Alternate
- ITF = ITF entry
- PR = Protected ranking
- SR = Special ranking
- SE = Special exempt
- JE = Junior exempt
- JR = Junior Accelerator Programme entrant
- CO = College Accelerator Programme entrant
- NG = Next Gen Accelerator Program entrant
- w/o = Walkover
- r = Retired
- d = Defaulted

First round
1	(Ukraine) D Molchanov (Slovakia) I Zelenay	6	6
(Argentina) JI Londero (Portugal) P Sousa	3	0
(Brazil) G Clezar (Argentina) JP Ficovich	6	6
WC	(Czech Republic) Libor Salaba (Czech Republic) J Šátral	3	2
4	(Lithuania) L Grigelis (Czech Republic) Z Kolář	6	6
(Czech Republic) Marek Jaloviec (Czech Republic) V Šafránek	3	2
(Romania) VV Cornea (Romania) P Grigoriu	6	6
(Ecuador) I Endara (Bulgaria) A Lazov	3	4
(Hungary) G Borsos (Serbia) Ilija Vučić	6	6^{6}	[5]
(Czech Republic) D Kellovský (Czech Republic) Robin Staněk	3	7^{8}	[10]
(Czech Republic) M Gengel (Czech Republic) Petr Michnev	2	3
3	(Poland) T Bednarek (Netherlands) D Pel	6	6
WC	(Czech Republic) Ľubomír Majšajdr (Czech Republic) Martin Zahrádka	4	7^{9}	[7]
(Argentina) Juan Ignacio Galarza (Argentina) A Velotti	6	6^{7}	[10]
(Bolivia) H Dellien (Dominican Republic) J Hernández-Fernández	3	4
2	(Germany) G Kretschmer (Germany) A Mies	6	6

Quarterfinals
1	(Ukraine) D Molchanov (Slovakia) I Zelenay	5	6	[6]
(Brazil) G Clezar (Argentina) JP Ficovich	7	4	[10]
4	(Lithuania) L Grigelis (Czech Republic) Z Kolář	6	6
(Romania) VV Cornea (Romania) P Grigoriu	2	3
(Czech Republic) D Kellovský (Czech Republic) R Staněk	3	5
3	(Poland) T Bednarek (Netherlands) D Pel	6	7
(Argentina) JI Galarza (Argentina) A Velotti	0	2
2	(Germany) G Kretschmer (Germany) A Mies	6	6

Semifinals
(Brazil) G Clezar (Argentina) JP Ficovich	4	7^{7}	[10]
4	(Lithuania) L Grigelis (Czech Republic) Z Kolář	6	6^{1}	[12]
3	(Poland) T Bednarek (Netherlands) D Pel	3	6	[15]
2	(Germany) G Kretschmer (Germany) A Mies	6	1	[13]

Final
4	(Lithuania) L Grigelis (Czech Republic) Z Kolář	6	6
3	(Poland) T Bednarek (Netherlands) D Pel	3	4
