= 2017 Svijany Open – Singles =

Singles
- 2017 Svijany Open

Final
- Champion: (Portugal) Pedro Sousa
- Runner-up: (Brazil) Guilherme Clezar
- Score: 6–4, 5–7, 6–2

Events
| Singles | Doubles |
| ← 2016 · | Svijany Open | · 2018 → |

Arthur De Greef was the defending champion but chose not to defend his title.

Pedro Sousa won the title after defeating Guilherme Clezar 6–4, 5–7, 6–2 in the final.

== Seeds ==
1. (Czech Republic) Adam Pavlásek (first round)
2. (Germany) Oscar Otte (quarterfinals)
3. (Germany) Cedrik-Marcel Stebe (second round)
4. (Portugal) Pedro Sousa (champion)
5. (Germany) Tobias Kamke (quarterfinals)
6. (Czech Republic) Lukáš Rosol (second round)
7. (Spain) Tommy Robredo (second round)
8. (Russia) Alexey Vatutin (first round)

== Draw ==
=== Key ===
- Q = Qualifier
- WC = Wild card
- LL = Lucky loser
- Alt = Alternate
- ITF = ITF entry
- PR = Protected ranking
- SR = Special ranking
- SE = Special exempt
- JE = Junior exempt
- JR = Junior Accelerator Programme entrant
- CO = College Accelerator Programme entrant
- NG = Next Gen Accelerator Program entrant
- w/o = Walkover
- r = Retired
- d = Defaulted

=== Finals ===
Semifinals
(Spain) Ricardo Ojeda Lara | 2 | 2
4 | (Portugal) Pedro Sousa | 6 | 6
(Czech Republic) Václav Šafránek | 6 | 2 | 3
(Brazil) Guilherme Clezar | 1 | 6 | 6

Final
4 | (Portugal) Pedro Sousa | 6 | 5 | 6
(Brazil) Guilherme Clezar | 4 | 7 | 2

=== Top half ===
First round
1 | (Czech Republic) A Pavlásek | 3 | 6 | 2
Q | (Argentina) JP Ficovich | 6 | 2 | 6
(Czech Republic) Z Kolář | 3 | 6 | 6^{4}
(Germany) Jeremy Jahn | 6 | 4 | 7^{7}
Q | (Czech Republic) Robin Staněk | 6 | 3 | 4
(Spain) R Ojeda Lara | 4 | 6 | 6
Q | (Bolivia) H Dellien | 4 | 4
7/WC | (Spain) T Robredo | 6 | 6
4 | (Portugal) P Sousa | 6 | 6
(Slovakia) A Martin | 2 | 4
(Czech Republic) Petr Michnev | 6 | 6
WC | (Czech Republic) D Kellovský | 3 | 3
Q | (Russia) R Safiullin | 6 | 6
(Australia) C O'Connell | 2 | 2
(Czech Republic) J Šátral | 5 | 6 | 3
5 | (Germany) T Kamke | 7 | 4 | 6

Second round
Q | (Argentina) JP Ficovich | 3 | 4
(Germany) J Jahn | 6 | 6
(Spain) R Ojeda Lara | 4 | 6 | 6
7/WC | (Spain) T Robredo | 6 | 1 | 4
4 | (Portugal) P Sousa | 6 | 7
(Czech Republic) P Michnev | 4 | 5
Q | (Russia) R Safiullin | 3 | 4
5 | (Germany) T Kamke | 6 | 6

Quarterfinals
(Germany) J Jahn | 6^{4} | 4
(Spain) R Ojeda Lara | 7^{7} | 6
4 | (Portugal) P Sousa | 6 | 6
5 | (Germany) T Kamke | 4 | 1

Semifinals
(Spain) R Ojeda Lara | 2 | 2
4 | (Portugal) P Sousa | 6 | 6

=== Bottom half ===
First round
8 | (Russia) A Vatutin | 4 | 5
(Czech Republic) V Šafránek | 6 | 7
(Uzbekistan) S Fayziev | 2 | 2
(Argentina) A Velotti | 6 | 6
(Lithuania) L Grigelis | 7^{7} | 7^{11}
(Italy) R Bellotti | 6^{4} | 6^{9}
WC | (Czech Republic) Marek Jaloviec | 2 | 5
3 | (Germany) C-M Stebe | 6 | 7
6 | (Czech Republic) L Rosol | 6 | 6
(Dominican Republic) J Hernández-Fernández | 4 | 3
(France) T Lamasine | 6 | 1 | 4
(Brazil) G Clezar | 1 | 6 | 6
(France) J Eysseric | 5 | 6 | 5
(Germany) D Brands | 7 | 3 | 7
WC | (Czech Republic) P Rikl | 4 | 2
2 | (Germany) O Otte | 6 | 6

Second round
(Czech Republic) V Šafránek | 4 | 6 | 7
(Argentina) A Velotti | 6 | 4 | 5
(Lithuania) L Grigelis | 6 | 3 | 6
3 | (Germany) C-M Stebe | 4 | 6 | 3
6 | (Czech Republic) L Rosol | 6^{0} | 3
(Brazil) G Clezar | 7^{7} | 6
(Germany) D Brands | 1 | 4
2 | (Germany) O Otte | 6 | 6

Quarterfinals
(Czech Republic) V Šafránek | 6^{14} | 6 | 6
(Lithuania) L Grigelis | 7^{16} | 1 | 3
(Brazil) G Clezar | 6 | 6
2 | (Germany) O Otte | 1 | 1

Semifinals
(Czech Republic) V Šafránek | 6 | 2 | 3
(Brazil) G Clezar | 1 | 6 | 6
