= 2015 Svijany Open – Singles =

Singles
- 2015 Svijany Open

Final
- Champion: (Germany) Tobias Kamke
- Runner-up: (Slovakia) Andrej Martin
- Score: 7–6^{(8–6)}, 6–4

Events
Singles	Doubles
← 2014 ·	Svijany Open	· 2016 →

Andrej Martin was the defending champion, but he lost in the final to Tobias Kamke.

== Seeds ==
1. (Belgium) Steve Darcis (first round)
2. (Kazakhstan) Aleksandr Nedovyesov (first round)
3. (Moldova) Radu Albot (semifinals)
4. (Belgium) Kimmer Coppejans (second round)
5. (Spain) Íñigo Cervantes (quarterfinals)
6. (Argentina) Horacio Zeballos (semifinals)
7. (Czech Republic) Adam Pavlásek (quarterfinals)
8. (Chile) Hans Podlipnik-Castillo (quarterfinals)

== Draw ==
=== Key ===
- Q = Qualifier
- WC = Wild card
- LL = Lucky loser
- Alt = Alternate
- SE = Special exempt
- PR = Protected ranking
- ITF = ITF entry
- JE = Junior exempt
- w/o = Walkover
- r = Retired
- d = Defaulted
- SR = Special ranking

=== Finals ===
Semifinals
(Slovakia) Andrej Martin	6	2	6
3	(Moldova) Radu Albot	2	6	3
6	(Argentina) Horacio Zeballos	3	4
(Germany) Tobias Kamke	6	6

Final
(Slovakia) Andrej Martin	6^{6}	4
(Germany) Tobias Kamke	7^{8}	6

=== Top half ===
First round
1	(Belgium) S Darcis	1	4
Q	(Croatia) M Delić	6	6
(Hungary) M Fucsovics	3	3
(Slovakia) A Martin	6	6
(Czech Republic) J Šátral	6	6
(Argentina) A Molteni	4	2
WC	(Czech Republic) V Šafránek	4	2
8	(Chile) H Podlipnik-Castillo	6	6
3	(Moldova) R Albot	6	3
PR	(Spain) J Checa-Calvo	2	1^{r}
(Germany) T Pütz	6	4	3
Q	(Argentina) JI Londero	4	6	6
WC	(Czech Republic) R Jebavý	5	1^{r}
(Czech Republic) J Mertl	7	1
(Belgium) G Gigounon	5	6	3
7	(Czech Republic) A Pavlásek	7	4	6

Second round
Q	(Croatia) M Delić	1	6	3
(Slovakia) A Martin	6	2	6
(Czech Republic) J Šátral	4	6	5
8	(Chile) H Podlipnik-Castillo	6	3	7
3	(Moldova) R Albot	6	6
Q	(Argentina) JI Londero	1	4
(Czech Republic) J Mertl	6^{6}	2
7	(Czech Republic) A Pavlásek	7^{8}	6

Quarterfinals
(Slovakia) A Martin	6	6
8	(Chile) H Podlipnik-Castillo	1	0
3	(Moldova) R Albot	6	6
7	(Czech Republic) A Pavlásek	1	1

Semifinals
(Slovakia) A Martin	6	2	6
3	(Moldova) R Albot	2	6	3

=== Bottom half ===
First round
6	(Argentina) H Zeballos	6	6
(Switzerland) H Laaksonen	3	0
Q	(Mexico) C Ramírez	4	3
(Croatia) A Veić	6	6
(Argentina) R Olivo	2	6	6
WC	(Czech Republic) Robin Staněk	6	2	2
(Chile) JC Sáez	1	1
4	(Belgium) K Coppejans	6	6
5	(Spain) Í Cervantes	4	6	7
(Belarus) U Ignatik	6	2	5
(France) M Bourque	6	6
(Serbia) P Krstin	2	3
Q	(Italy) F Cipolla	6	6
(Spain) R Carballés Baena	4	4
(Germany) T Kamke	6	6
2	(Kazakhstan) A Nedovyesov	4	3

Second round
6	(Argentina) H Zeballos	6	6
(Croatia) A Veić	1	2
(Argentina) R Olivo	3	6	7^{7}
4	(Belgium) K Coppejans	6	2	6^{5}
5	(Spain) Í Cervantes	7	6
(France) M Bourque	5	3
Q	(Italy) F Cipolla	2	6	3
(Germany) T Kamke	6	3	6

Quarterfinals
6	(Argentina) H Zeballos	6^{4}	6	6
(Argentina) R Olivo	7^{7}	4	4
5	(Spain) Í Cervantes	5	4
(Germany) T Kamke	7	6

Semifinals
6	(Argentina) H Zeballos	3	4
(Germany) T Kamke	6	6
