= 2022 Svijany Open – Singles =

Singles
- 2022 Svijany Open

Final
- Champion: (Czech Republic) Jiří Lehečka
- Runner-up: (Spain) Nicolás Álvarez Varona
- Score: 6–4, 6–4

Events
Singles	Doubles
← 2021 ·	Svijany Open	· 2023 →

Alex Molčan was the defending champion but chose not to defend his title.

Jiří Lehečka won the title after defeating Nicolás Álvarez Varona 6–4, 6–4 in the final.

== Seeds ==
1. (Czech Republic) Jiří Lehečka (champion)
2. (Portugal) Nuno Borges (quarterfinals)
3. (Slovakia) Norbert Gombos (quarterfinals)
4. (Czech Republic) Tomáš Macháč (quarterfinals)
5. (Austria) Jurij Rodionov (first round)
6. (France) Manuel Guinard (second round)
7. (Czech Republic) Vít Kopřiva (quarterfinals)
8. (Austria) Gerald Melzer (withdrew)

== Draw ==
=== Key ===
- Q = Qualifier
- WC = Wild card
- LL = Lucky loser
- Alt = Alternate
- ITF = ITF entry
- PR = Protected ranking
- SR = Special ranking
- SE = Special exempt
- JE = Junior exempt
- JR = Junior Accelerator Programme entrant
- CO = College Accelerator Programme entrant
- NG = Next Gen Accelerator Program entrant
- w/o = Walkover
- r = Retired
- d = Defaulted

=== Finals ===
Semifinals
1	(Czech Republic) Jiří Lehečka	6	6^{5}	7^{7}
Q	(France) Giovanni Mpetshi Perricard	4	7^{7}	6^{5}
Alt	(Finland) Otto Virtanen	1	6	6^{4}
(Spain) Nicolás Álvarez Varona	6	2	7^{7}

Final
1	(Czech Republic) Jiří Lehečka	6	6
(Spain) Nicolás Álvarez Varona	4	4

=== Top half ===
First round
1	(Czech Republic) J Lehečka	6	6
(Germany) N Kuhn	2	1
(Italy) L Giustino	3	6	6^{3}
Q	(India) S Nagal	6	2	7^{7}
(Ukraine) O Krutykh	3	7^{12}	4
WC	(Czech Republic) A Paulson	6	6^{10}	6
(Croatia) D Ajduković	2	1
7	(Czech Republic) V Kopřiva	6	6
3	(Slovakia) N Gombos	6	2	6
PR	(Portugal) P Sousa	4	6	2
(Spain) O Roca Batalla	6	6
(Czech Republic) J Forejtek	2	2
(Slovakia) L Klein	6^{5}	6^{4}
Q	(France) G Mpetshi Perricard	7^{7}	7^{7}
Q	(Czech Republic) P Nouza	6^{4}	4
LL	(Ukraine) V Sachko	7^{7}	6

Second round
1	(Czech Republic) J Lehečka	6	1	6
Q	(India) S Nagal	4	6	3
WC	(Czech Republic) A Paulson	4	6	3
7	(Czech Republic) V Kopřiva	6	1	6
3	(Slovakia) N Gombos	1	7	6
(Spain) O Roca Batalla	6	5	1
Q	(France) G Mpetshi Perricard	7	6
LL	(Ukraine) V Sachko	5	3

Quarterfinals
1	(Czech Republic) J Lehečka	6	6
7	(Czech Republic) V Kopřiva	4	1
3	(Slovakia) N Gombos	3	6	6^{3}
Q	(France) G Mpetshi Perricard	6	2	7^{7}

Semifinals
1	(Czech Republic) J Lehečka	6	6^{5}	7^{7}
Q	(France) G Mpetshi Perricard	4	7^{7}	6^{5}

=== Bottom half ===
First round
6	(France) M Guinard	6	6
Q	(Kazakhstan) D Yevseyev	3	4
Alt	(Finland) O Virtanen	3	6	6
Q	(Austria) L Neumayer	6	4	4
(Germany) L Wessels	4	6	4
Q	(Israel) Y Oliel	6	1	6
(Austria) S Ofner	6^{3}	3
4	(Czech Republic) T Macháč	7^{7}	6
5	(Austria) J Rodionov	6	4	2
(Germany) C-M Stebe	4	6	6
(Spain) N Álvarez Varona	6	6
WC	(Czech Republic) D Siniakov	4	3
(Hungary) F Marozsán	6	6
WC	(Czech Republic) M Vrbenský	1	1
(Kazakhstan) T Skatov	1	3
2	(Portugal) N Borges	6	6

Second round
6	(France) M Guinard	2	6	6^{1}
Alt	(Finland) O Virtanen	6	1	7^{7}
Q	(Israel) Y Oliel	3	4
4	(Czech Republic) T Macháč	6	6
(Germany) C-M Stebe	6^{6}	6	3
(Spain) N Álvarez Varona	7^{8}	2	6
(Hungary) F Marozsán	3	4
2	(Portugal) N Borges	6	6

Quarterfinals
Alt	(Finland) O Virtanen	2	6	6
4	(Czech Republic) T Macháč	6	3	2
(Spain) N Álvarez Varona	6	6
2	(Portugal) N Borges	4	2

Semifinals
Alt	(Finland) O Virtanen	1	6	6^{4}
(Spain) N Álvarez Varona	6	2	7^{7}
