= 2024 Svijany Open – Singles =

Singles
- 2024 Svijany Open

Final
- Champion: (Bolivia) Hugo Dellien
- Runner-up: (Denmark) Elmer Møller
- Score: 5–7, 6–4, 6–1

Events
Singles	Doubles
- Svijany Open

Francisco Comesaña was the defending champion but chose not to defend his title.

Hugo Dellien won the title after defeating Elmer Møller 5–7, 6–4, 6–1 in the final.

== Seeds ==
1. (Bolivia) Hugo Dellien (champion)
2. (United States) Nicolas Moreno de Alboran (semifinals)
3. (Romania) Filip Cristian Jianu (second round)
4. (Czech Republic) Jiří Veselý (first round)
5. (Turkey) Ergi Kırkın (first round)
6. (France) Geoffrey Blancaneaux (quarterfinals)
7. (Switzerland) Jérôme Kym (second round)
8. (Czech Republic) Michael Vrbenský (quarterfinals)

== Draw ==
Key

- Q = Qualifier
- WC = Wild card
- LL = Lucky loser
- Alt = Alternate
- ITF = ITF entry
- PR = Protected ranking
- SR = Special ranking
- SE = Special exempt
- JE = Junior exempt
- JR = Junior Accelerator Programme entrant
- CO = College Accelerator Programme entrant
- NG = Next Gen Accelerator Program entrant
- w/o = Walkover
- r = Retired
- d = Defaulted

=== Finals ===
Semifinals
1	(Bolivia) Hugo Dellien	7^{7}	6
(France) Manuel Guinard	6^{5}	4
(Denmark) Elmer Møller	6	4	7^{8}
2	(United States) Nicolas Moreno de Alboran	1	6	6^{6}

Final
1	(Bolivia) Hugo Dellien	5	6	6
(Denmark) Elmer Møller	7	4	1

=== Top half ===
First round
1	(Bolivia) H Dellien	7^{7}	6
(Czech Republic) D Svrčina	6^{3}	1
WC	(Czech Republic) Jakub Nicod	3	1
Q	(Slovakia) M Kližan	6	6
Q	(Austria) N Oberleitner	1	3
Q	(Czech Republic) J Forejtek	6	6
(Ukraine) V Sachko	4	6	7^{7}
5	(Turkey) E Kırkın	6	3	6^{3}
4	(Czech Republic) J Veselý	6	3	2
WC	(Czech Republic) M Krumich	4	6	6
(France) M Guinard	6	6
(Austria) J Schwärzler	4	4
(Spain) N Sánchez Izquierdo	3	7^{7}	6
Q	(Ukraine) O Prihodko	6	6^{2}	1
Alt	(United States) T Kodat	5	1
8	(Czech Republic) M Vrbenský	7	6

Second round
1	(Bolivia) H Dellien	6	4
Q	(Slovakia) M Kližan	4	0^{r}
Q	(Czech Republic) J Forejtek	6	0	2
(Ukraine) V Sachko	0	6	6
WC	(Czech Republic) M Krumich	3	1
(France) M Guinard	6	6
(Spain) N Sánchez Izquierdo	4	2
8	(Czech Republic) M Vrbenský	6	6

Quarterfinals
1	(Bolivia) H Dellien	6	6
(Ukraine) V Sachko	3	0
(France) M Guinard	3	6	6
8	(Czech Republic) M Vrbenský	6	1	3

Semifinals
1	(Bolivia) H Dellien	7^{7}	6
(France) M Guinard	6^{5}	4

=== Bottom half ===
First round
7	(Switzerland) J Kym	6	6
WC	(Czech Republic) J Kumstát	3	0
PR	(Czech Republic) A Paulson	7	7^{7}
(Spain) D Jordà Sanchis	5	6^{4}
Q	(Argentina) JB Torres	4	1
(Denmark) E Møller	6	6
Q	(Croatia) M Poljičak	5	2
3	(Romania) FC Jianu	7	6
6	(France) G Blancaneaux	6	6
(Croatia) M Dodig	3	0
Alt	I Gakhov	6	2	2
(Germany) M Möller	2	6	6
(Germany) D Masur	5	7	6^{7}
(Argentina) S Rodríguez Taverna	7	5	7^{9}
(Spain) C Taberner	6^{7}	3
2	(United States) N Moreno de Alboran	7^{9}	6

Second round
7	(Switzerland) J Kym	6^{5}	7^{8}	3
PR	(Czech Republic) A Paulson	7^{7}	6^{6}	6
(Denmark) E Møller	6	6
3	(Romania) FC Jianu	2	1
6	(France) G Blancaneaux	6	6
(Germany) M Möller	3	1
(Argentina) S Rodríguez Taverna	6^{6}	6^{5}
2	(United States) N Moreno de Alboran	7^{8}	7^{7}

Quarterfinals
PR	(Czech Republic) A Paulson	2	3
(Denmark) E Møller	6	6
6	(France) G Blancaneaux	4	4
2	(United States) N Moreno de Alboran	6	6

Semifinals
(Denmark) E Møller	6	4	7^{8}
2	(United States) N Moreno de Alboran	1	6	6^{6}
