= 2022 Svijany Open – Doubles =

Doubles
- 2022 Svijany Open

Final
- Champions: (Austria) Neil Oberleitner (Austria) Philipp Oswald
- Runners-up: (Czech Republic) Roman Jebavý (Czech Republic) Adam Pavlásek
- Score: 7–6^{(7–5)}, 6–2

Events
Singles	Doubles
← 2021 ·	Svijany Open	· 2023 →

Roman Jebavý and Igor Zelenay were the defending champions but only Jebavý chose to defend his title, partnering Adam Pavlásek. Jebavý lost in the final to Neil Oberleitner and Philipp Oswald.

Oberleitner and Oswald won the title after defeating Jebavý and Pavlásek 7–6^{(7–5)}, 6–2 in the final.

== Seeds ==
1. (Austria) Alexander Erler / (Austria) Lucas Miedler (quarterfinals)
2. (France) Sadio Doumbia / (France) Fabien Reboul (withdrew)
3. (Czech Republic) Roman Jebavý / (Czech Republic) Adam Pavlásek (final)
4. (Uruguay) Martín Cuevas / (Venezuela) Luis David Martínez (first round)

== Draw ==
=== Key ===
- Q = Qualifier
- WC = Wild card
- LL = Lucky loser
- Alt = Alternate
- ITF = ITF entry
- PR = Protected ranking
- SR = Special ranking
- SE = Special exempt
- JE = Junior exempt
- JR = Junior Accelerator Programme entrant
- CO = College Accelerator Programme entrant
- NG = Next Gen Accelerator Program entrant
- w/o = Walkover
- r = Retired
- d = Defaulted

First round
1	(Austria) A Erler (Austria) L Miedler	6	6
(Kazakhstan) T Skatov (Kazakhstan) D Yevseyev	2	3
(Germany) N Kuhn (Czech Republic) L Rosol	2	7^{7}	[3]
(Czech Republic) P Nouza (Czech Republic) A Paulson	6	6^{5}	[10]
4	(Uruguay) M Cuevas (Venezuela) LD Martínez	3	6	[7]
(Sweden) F Bergevi (Ukraine) Eric Vanshelboim	6	1	[10]
(Ukraine) V Manafov (Ukraine) O Prihodko	6^{4}	3
(Austria) N Oberleitner (Austria) P Oswald	7^{7}	6
(Uzbekistan) S Fayziev (Ukraine) O Krutykh	6	5	[7]
(Czech Republic) J Forejtek (Czech Republic) M Vrbenský	4	7	[10]
WC	(Czech Republic) Michal Franěk (Czech Republic) Lubomír Majšajdr	1	2
3	(Czech Republic) R Jebavý (Czech Republic) A Pavlásek	6	6
(Spain) N Álvarez Varona (Brazil) T Seyboth Wild	4	7^{7}	[10]
(France) T Arribagé (France) L Sanchez	6	6^{5}	[7]
WC	(Czech Republic) Adam Jurajda (Czech Republic) D Siniakov	4	3
Alt	(Czech Republic) V Kopřiva (Czech Republic) J Pospíšil	6	6

Quarterfinals
1	(Austria) A Erler (Austria) L Miedler	6	3	[1]
(Czech Republic) P Nouza (Czech Republic) A Paulson	1	6	[10]
(Sweden) F Bergevi (Ukraine) E Vanshelboim	6^{5}	6^{6}
(Austria) N Oberleitner (Austria) P Oswald	7^{7}	7^{8}
(Czech Republic) J Forejtek (Czech Republic) M Vrbenský	4	3
3	(Czech Republic) R Jebavý (Czech Republic) A Pavlásek	6	6
(Spain) N Álvarez Varona (Brazil) T Seyboth Wild	6	7^{7}
Alt	(Czech Republic) V Kopřiva (Czech Republic) J Pospíšil	0	6^{5}

Semifinals
(Czech Republic) P Nouza (Czech Republic) A Paulson	3	3
(Austria) N Oberleitner (Austria) P Oswald	6	6
3	(Czech Republic) R Jebavý (Czech Republic) A Pavlásek	6	6
(Spain) N Álvarez Varona (Brazil) T Seyboth Wild	4	3

Final
(Austria) N Oberleitner (Austria) P Oswald	7^{7}	6
3	(Czech Republic) R Jebavý (Czech Republic) A Pavlásek	6^{5}	2
