= 2019 Svijany Open – Doubles =

Doubles
- 2019 Svijany Open

Final
- Champions: (Czech Republic) Jonáš Forejtek (Czech Republic) Michael Vrbenský
- Runners-up: (Serbia) Nikola Čačić (Croatia) Antonio Šančić
- Score: 6–4, 6–3

Events
Singles	Doubles
← 2018 ·	Svijany Open	· 2021 →

Sander Gillé and Joran Vliegen were the defending champions but chose not to defend their title.

Jonáš Forejtek and Michael Vrbenský won the title after defeating Nikola Čačić and Antonio Šančić 6–4, 6–3 in the final.

== Seeds ==
1. (Belarus) Andrei Vasilevski / (Austria) Tristan-Samuel Weissborn (semifinals)
2. (Serbia) Nikola Čačić / (Croatia) Antonio Šančić (final)
3. (India) Sriram Balaji / (India) Vishnu Vardhan (quarterfinals)
4. (Croatia) Tomislav Draganja / (Australia) Scott Puodziunas (semifinals)

== Draw ==
=== Key ===
- Q = Qualifier
- WC = Wild card
- LL = Lucky loser
- Alt = Alternate
- SE = Special exempt
- PR = Protected ranking
- ITF = ITF entry
- JE = Junior exempt
- w/o = Walkover
- r = Retired
- d = Defaulted
- SR = Special ranking

First round
1	(Belarus) A Vasilevski (Austria) T-S Weissborn	6	6
(Australia) A Taylor (Australia) J Taylor	4	2
(Croatia) I Sabanov (Croatia) M Sabanov	w/o
(Portugal) J Domingues (Serbia) N Milojević
3	(India) S Balaji (India) V Vardhan	6	3	[10]
(France) S Doumbia (France) F Reboul	4	6	[6]
WC	(Czech Republic) J Forejtek (Czech Republic) M Vrbenský	6	6
ITF	(Romania) VV Cornea (Romania) A Jecan	1	3
ITF	(Czech Republic) V Kopřiva (Czech Republic) J Pospíšil	w/o
(Romania) D Dima (Italy) GM Moroni
(Italy) F Baldi (Argentina) A Collarini	4	6^{4}
4	(Croatia) T Draganja (Australia) S Puodziunas	6	7^{7}
(Turkey) T Altuna (India) VS Prashanth	4	1
WC	(Czech Republic) J Lehečka (Czech Republic) J Veselý	6	6
WC	(Czech Republic) Lubomír Majšajdr (Czech Republic) Martin Zahrádka	6^{5}	4
2	(Serbia) N Čačić (Croatia) A Šančić	7^{7}	6

Quarterfinals
1	(Belarus) A Vasilevski (Austria) T-S Weissborn	3	7^{7}	[10]
(Croatia) I Sabanov (Croatia) M Sabanov	6	6^{4}	[6]
3	(India) S Balaji (India) V Vardhan	4	2
WC	(Czech Republic) J Forejtek (Czech Republic) M Vrbenský	6	6
ITF	(Czech Republic) V Kopřiva (Czech Republic) J Pospíšil	4	6	[8]
4	(Croatia) T Draganja (Australia) S Puodziunas	6	4	[10]
WC	(Czech Republic) J Lehečka (Czech Republic) J Veselý
2	(Serbia) N Čačić (Croatia) A Šančić	w/o

Semifinals
1	(Belarus) A Vasilevski (Austria) T-S Weissborn	1	4
WC	(Czech Republic) J Forejtek (Czech Republic) M Vrbenský	6	6
4	(Croatia) T Draganja (Australia) S Puodziunas	0	6^{5}
2	(Serbia) N Čačić (Croatia) A Šančić	6	7^{7}

Final
WC	(Czech Republic) J Forejtek (Czech Republic) M Vrbenský	6	6
2	(Serbia) N Čačić (Croatia) A Šančić	4	3
