= 2024 Svijany Open =

- Date: 29 July – 4 August
- Edition: 11th
- Location: Liberec, Czech Republic

Champions

Singles
- (Bolivia) Hugo Dellien

Doubles
- (Czech Republic) Jonáš Forejtek / (Czech Republic) Michael Vrbenský
- Svijany Open

The 2024 Svijany Open was a professional tennis tournament played on clay courts. It was the 11th edition of the tournament which was part of the 2024 ATP Challenger Tour. It took place in Liberec, Czech Republic between 29 July and 4 August 2024.

== Singles main-draw entrants ==
=== Seeds ===
Country	Player	Rank^{1}	Seed
BOL	Hugo Dellien	141	1
USA	Nicolas Moreno de Alboran	143	2
ROU	Filip Cristian Jianu	239	3
CZE	Jiří Veselý	260	4
TUR	Ergi Kırkın	262	5
FRA	Geoffrey Blancaneaux	269	6
SUI	Jérôme Kym	278	7
CZE	Michael Vrbenský	279	8

- ^{1} Rankings are as of 22 July 2024.

=== Other entrants ===
The following players received wildcards into the singles main draw:

- (Czech Republic) Martin Krumich
- (Czech Republic) Jan Kumstát
- (Czech Republic) Jakub Nicod

The following player received entry into the singles main draw using a protected ranking:

- (Czech Republic) Andrew Paulson

The following players received entry into the singles main draw as alternates:

- Ivan Gakhov
- (United States) Toby Kodat

The following players received entry from the qualifying draw:

- (Czech Republic) Jonáš Forejtek
- (Slovakia) Martin Kližan
- (Austria) Neil Oberleitner
- (Croatia) Mili Poljičak
- (Ukraine) Oleg Prihodko
- (Argentina) Juan Bautista Torres

== Champions ==
=== Singles ===
- (Bolivia) Hugo Dellien def. (Denmark) Elmer Møller 5–7, 6–4, 6–1.

=== Doubles ===
- (Czech Republic) Jonáš Forejtek / (Czech Republic) Michael Vrbenský def. (Slovakia) Miloš Karol / (Slovakia) Tomáš Lánik 7–5, 6–7^{(5–7)}, [10–4].
