= 2024 Svijany Open – Doubles =

Doubles
- 2024 Svijany Open

Final
- Champions: (Czech Republic) Jonáš Forejtek (Czech Republic) Michael Vrbenský
- Runners-up: (Slovakia) Miloš Karol (Slovakia) Tomáš Lánik
- Score: 7–5, 6–7^{(5–7)}, [10–4]

Events
| Singles | Doubles |
- Svijany Open

Petr Nouza and Andrew Paulson were the defending champions but chose not to defend their title.

Jonáš Forejtek and Michael Vrbenský won the title after defeating Miloš Karol and Tomáš Lánik 7–5, 6–7^{(5–7)}, [10–4] in the final.

== Seeds ==
1. (France) Manuel Guinard / (Ukraine) Vitaliy Sachko (quarterfinals)
2. (Brazil) Luís Britto / (Israel) Roy Stepanov (first round)
3. (Uruguay) Ignacio Carou / (Spain) Bruno Pujol Navarro (first round)
4. (India) Siddhant Banthia / (Zimbabwe) Courtney John Lock (first round)

== Draw ==
Key

- Q = Qualifier
- WC = Wild card
- LL = Lucky loser
- Alt = Alternate
- ITF = ITF entry
- PR = Protected ranking
- SR = Special ranking
- SE = Special exempt
- JE = Junior exempt
- JR = Junior Accelerator Programme entrant
- CO = College Accelerator Programme entrant
- NG = Next Gen Accelerator Program entrant
- w/o = Walkover
- r = Retired
- d = Defaulted

=== Draw ===
First round
1 | (France) M Guinard (Ukraine) V Sachko | 6 | 6
(Spain) D Jordà Sanchis (Argentina) S Rodríguez Taverna | 3 | 4
Alt | (Czech Republic) Jiří Barnat (Czech Republic) F Duda | 7^{7} | 6^{3} | [10]
(Czech Republic) R Jebavý (Czech Republic) J Veselý | 6^{4} | 7^{7} | [8]
4 | (India) S Banthia (Zimbabwe) CJ Lock | 2 | 7^{7} | [8]
(Spain) N Sánchez Izquierdo (Spain) C Taberner | 6 | 6^{5} | [10]
(Slovakia) M Karol (Slovakia) Tomáš Lánik | 6 | 7
WC | (Czech Republic) Jonáš Kučera (Czech Republic) Lubomír Majšajdr | 0 | 5
WC | (Czech Republic) Petr Brunclík (Czech Republic) Matyáš Černý | 7 | 3 | [3]
(Turkey) E Kırkın (Czech Republic) M Vocel | 5 | 6 | [10]
(Czech Republic) J Forejtek (Czech Republic) M Vrbenský | 7 | 6
3 | (Uruguay) I Carou (Spain) B Pujol Navarro | 5 | 1
(Austria) N Oberleitner (Austria) J Schwärzler | 7^{7} | 2 | [7]
Alt | (Czech Republic) Jakub Nicod (Netherlands) J Sels | 6^{5} | 6 | [10]
PR | (Australia) B Bayldon (Netherlands) M Hermans | 4 | 6 | [12]
2 | (Brazil) L Britto (Israel) R Stepanov | 6 | 1 | [10]

Quarterfinals
1 | (France) M Guinard (Ukraine) V Sachko | 5 | 6 | [10]
Alt | (Czech Republic) J Barnat (Czech Republic) F Duda | 7 | 3 | [12]
(Spain) N Sánchez Izquierdo (Spain) C Taberner | 4 | 6^{3}
(Slovakia) M Karol (Slovakia) T Lánik | 6 | 7^{7}
(Turkey) E Kırkın (Czech Republic) M Vocel | 3 | 4
(Czech Republic) J Forejtek (Czech Republic) M Vrbenský | 6 | 6
Alt | (Czech Republic) J Nicod (Netherlands) J Sels | 6 | 6
PR | (Australia) B Bayldon (Netherlands) M Hermans | 1 | 4

Semifinals
Alt | (Czech Republic) J Barnat (Czech Republic) F Duda | 3 | 2
(Slovakia) M Karol (Slovakia) T Lánik | 6 | 6
(Czech Republic) J Forejtek (Czech Republic) M Vrbenský | 1 | 6 | [12]
Alt | (Czech Republic) J Nicod (Netherlands) J Sels | 6 | 3 | [10]

Final
(Slovakia) M Karol (Slovakia) T Lánik | 5 | 7^{7} | [4]
(Czech Republic) J Forejtek (Czech Republic) M Vrbenský | 7 | 6^{5} | [10]
