= 2015 Svijany Open – Doubles =

Doubles
- 2015 Svijany Open

Final
- Champions: (Slovakia) Andrej Martin (Chile) Hans Podlipnik
- Runners-up: (Netherlands) Wesley Koolhof (Netherlands) Matwé Middelkoop
- Score: 7–5, 6–7^{(3–7)}, [10–5]

Events
Singles	Doubles
- Svijany Open

Roman Jebavý and Jaroslav Pospíšil were the defending champions, but Pospíšil did not participate this year. Jebavý played alongside Jan Šátral, but they lost in quarterfinals to Lubomír Majšajdr and Martin Zahrádka.

Andrej Martin and Hans Podlipnik won the tournament, defeating Wesley Koolhof and Matwé Middelkoop in the final, 7–5, 6–7^{(3–7)}, [10–5].

== Seeds ==
1. (Netherlands) Wesley Koolhof / (Netherlands) Matwé Middelkoop (final)
2. (Poland) Mateusz Kowalczyk / (Slovakia) Igor Zelenay (first round)
3. (Mexico) César Ramírez / (Mexico) Miguel Ángel Reyes-Varela (semifinals)
4. (Czech Republic) Roman Jebavý / (Czech Republic) Jan Šátral (quarterfinals)

== Draw ==
Key

- Q = Qualifier
- WC = Wild card
- LL = Lucky loser
- Alt = Alternate
- ITF = ITF entry
- PR = Protected ranking
- SR = Special ranking
- SE = Special exempt
- JE = Junior exempt
- JR = Junior Accelerator Programme entrant
- CO = College Accelerator Programme entrant
- NG = Next Gen Accelerator Program entrant
- w/o = Walkover
- r = Retired
- d = Defaulted

=== Draw ===
First round
1	(Netherlands) W Koolhof (Netherlands) M Middelkoop	7	4	[10]
(Serbia) I Bozoljac (Italy) F Cipolla	5	6	[5]
(Argentina) JI Londero (Argentina) A Molteni	6	3	[8]
WC	(Czech Republic) Jan Kunčík (Czech Republic) Libor Salaba	4	6	[10]
4	(Czech Republic) R Jebavý (Czech Republic) J Šátral	6	6
(Poland) T Bednarek (Chile) J Peralta	3	3
WC	(Czech Republic) Lubomír Majšajdr (Czech Republic) Martin Zahrádka	6	4	[10]
(Belgium) K Coppejans (Belgium) G Gigounon	4	6	[8]
(Czech Republic) J Mertl (Kazakhstan) A Nedovyesov	6	6
WC	(Czech Republic) V Šafránek (Czech Republic) Dominik Süč	2	1
(Australia) A Hubble (Chinese Taipei) H-y Peng	3	2
3	(Mexico) C Ramírez (Mexico) MÁ Reyes-Varela	6	6
(Republic of Ireland) J Cluskey (Hungary) M Fucsovics	1	5
(Slovakia) A Martin (Chile) H Podlipnik Castillo	6	7
(Moldova) R Albot (Czech Republic) A Pavlásek	2	6	[10]
2	(Poland) M Kowalczyk (Slovakia) I Zelenay	6	2	[5]

Quarterfinals
1	(Netherlands) W Koolhof (Netherlands) M Middelkoop	6	6
WC	(Czech Republic) J Kunčík (Czech Republic) L Salaba	0	4
4	(Czech Republic) R Jebavý (Czech Republic) J Šátral	6	5	[8]
WC	(Czech Republic) L Majšajdr (Czech Republic) M Zahrádka	2	7	[10]
(Czech Republic) J Mertl (Kazakhstan) A Nedovyesov	2	5
3	(Mexico) C Ramírez (Mexico) MÁ Reyes-Varela	6	7
(Slovakia) A Martin (Chile) H Podlipnik Castillo	6	7^{7}
(Moldova) R Albot (Czech Republic) A Pavlásek	3	6^{3}

Semifinals
1	(Netherlands) W Koolhof (Netherlands) M Middelkoop	6	6
WC	(Czech Republic) L Majšajdr (Czech Republic) M Zahrádka	1	2
3	(Mexico) C Ramírez (Mexico) MÁ Reyes-Varela	4	3
(Slovakia) A Martin (Chile) H Podlipnik Castillo	6	6

Final
1	(Netherlands) W Koolhof (Netherlands) M Middelkoop	5	7^{7}	[5]
(Slovakia) A Martin (Chile) H Podlipnik Castillo	7	6^{3}	[10]
