= 2025 Svijany Open – Doubles =

Doubles
- 2025 Svijany Open

Final
- Champions: (Czech Republic) Andrew Paulson (Czech Republic) Michael Vrbenský
- Runners-up: (Czech Republic) Jiří Barnat (Czech Republic) Filip Duda
- Score: 6–4, 6–1

Events
Singles	Doubles
- Svijany Open

Jonáš Forejtek and Michael Vrbenský were the defending champions but only Vrbenský chose to defend his title, partnering Andrew Paulson. He successfully defended his title after defeating Jiří Barnat and Filip Duda 6–4, 6–1 in the final.

== Seeds ==
1. (Ukraine) Denys Molchanov / (Spain) David Vega Hernández (first round)
2. (Poland) Szymon Kielan / (Poland) Filip Pieczonka (semifinals)
3. (Czech Republic) Andrew Paulson / (Czech Republic) Michael Vrbenský (champions)
4. (Czech Republic) Jiří Barnat / (Czech Republic) Filip Duda (final)

== Draw ==
Key

- Q = Qualifier
- WC = Wild card
- LL = Lucky loser
- Alt = Alternate
- ITF = ITF entry
- PR = Protected ranking
- SR = Special ranking
- SE = Special exempt
- JE = Junior exempt
- JR = Junior Accelerator Programme entrant
- CO = College Accelerator Programme entrant
- NG = Next Gen Accelerator Program entrant
- w/o = Walkover
- r = Retired
- d = Defaulted

=== Draw ===
First round
1	(Ukraine) D Molchanov (Spain) D Vega Hernández	6	3	[2]
(Belgium) M Geerts (Poland) S Walków	4	6	[10]
(Czech Republic) J Jermář (Ukraine) O Prihodko	0	7^{7}	[5]
(Czech Republic) H Bartoň (Slovakia) M Karol	6	6^{4}	[10]
4	(Czech Republic) Jiří Barnat (Czech Republic) F Duda	6	6
(Peru) G Bueno (Argentina) GA Olivieri	2	3
(Uruguay) I Carou (Argentina) S Rodríguez Taverna	5	4
(France) A Reymond (France) L Sanchez	7	6
WC	(Czech Republic) Matyáš Černý (Czech Republic) Jonáš Kučera	4	4
WC	(Czech Republic) Petr Brunclík (Czech Republic) J Kumstát	6	6
(Czech Republic) D Poljak (China) A Wang	6	3	[3]
3	(Czech Republic) A Paulson (Czech Republic) M Vrbenský	4	6	[10]
(Germany) T Rühl (Germany) P Zahraj	6	1	[5]
(Brazil) L Britto (Israel) R Stepanov	4	6	[10]
(India) SDP Dev (India) Nitin Kumar Sinha	4	3
2	(Poland) S Kielan (Poland) F Pieczonka	6	6

Quarterfinals
(Belgium) M Geerts (Poland) S Walków	6	2	[9]
(Czech Republic) H Bartoň (Slovakia) M Karol	3	6	[11]
4	(Czech Republic) J Barnat (Czech Republic) F Duda	6	3	[10]
(France) A Reymond (France) L Sanchez	4	6	[7]
WC	(Czech Republic) P Brunclík (Czech Republic) J Kumstát	6^{2}	6^{4}
3	(Czech Republic) A Paulson (Czech Republic) M Vrbenský	7^{7}	7^{7}
(Brazil) L Britto (Israel) R Stepanov	4	2
2	(Poland) S Kielan (Poland) F Pieczonka	6	6

Semifinals
(Czech Republic) H Bartoň (Slovakia) M Karol	4	6	[8]
4	(Czech Republic) J Barnat (Czech Republic) F Duda	6	4	[10]
3	(Czech Republic) A Paulson (Czech Republic) M Vrbenský	6	6
2	(Poland) S Kielan (Poland) F Pieczonka	3	4

Final
4	(Czech Republic) J Barnat (Czech Republic) F Duda	4	1
3	(Czech Republic) A Paulson (Czech Republic) M Vrbenský	6	6
