= 2023 Svijany Open =

- Date: 31 July – 6 August
- Edition: 10th
- Location: Liberec, Czech Republic

Champions

Singles
- (Argentina) Francisco Comesaña

Doubles
- (Czech Republic) Petr Nouza / (Czech Republic) Andrew Paulson
- Svijany Open

The 2023 Svijany Open was a professional tennis tournament played on clay courts. It was the 10th edition of the tournament which was part of the 2023 ATP Challenger Tour, and took place in Liberec, Czech Republic between 31 July and 6 August 2023.

== Singles main-draw entrants ==
=== Seeds ===
Country	Player	Rank^{1}	Seed
CZE	Tomáš Macháč	109	1
SVK	Lukáš Klein	153	2
CZE	Dalibor Svrčina	167	3
IND	Sumit Nagal	178	4
ITA	Riccardo Bonadio	192	5
SVK	Norbert Gombos	197	6
CZE	Jakub Menšík	200	7
ARG	Francisco Comesaña	238	8

- ^{1} Rankings are as of 24 July 2023.

=== Other entrants ===
The following players received wildcards into the singles main draw:

- (Czech Republic) Hynek Bartoň
- (Czech Republic) Andrew Paulson
- (Czech Republic) Jiří Veselý

The following players received entry from the qualifying draw:

- (France) Constantin Bittoun Kouzmine
- (Argentina) Federico Agustín Gómez
- Kirill Kivattsev
- (United States) Toby Kodat
- (Spain) Àlex Martí Pujolràs
- (Czech Republic) Michael Vrbenský

== Champions ==
=== Singles ===
- (Argentina) Francisco Comesaña def. (United States) Toby Kodat 6–2, 6–4.

=== Doubles ===
- (Czech Republic) Petr Nouza / (Czech Republic) Andrew Paulson def. (Austria) Neil Oberleitner / (Germany) Tim Sandkaulen 6–3, 6–4.
