= 2023 Svijany Open – Doubles =

Doubles
- 2023 Svijany Open

Final
- Champions: (Czech Republic) Petr Nouza (Czech Republic) Andrew Paulson
- Runners-up: (Austria) Neil Oberleitner (Germany) Tim Sandkaulen
- Score: 6–3, 6–4

Events
Singles	Doubles
- Svijany Open

Neil Oberleitner and Philipp Oswald were the defending champions but only Oberleitner chose to defend his title, partnering Tim Sandkaulen. Oberleitner lost in the final to Petr Nouza and Andrew Paulson.

Nouza and Paulson won the title after defeating Oberleitner and Sandkaulen 6–3, 6–4 in the final.

== Seeds ==
1. (Czech Republic) Petr Nouza / (Czech Republic) Andrew Paulson (champions)
2. (Austria) Neil Oberleitner / (Germany) Tim Sandkaulen (final)
3. (Austria) David Pichler / (Ukraine) Oleg Prihodko (quarterfinals)
4. (Argentina) Federico Agustín Gómez / (United Kingdom) Marcus Willis (semifinals)

== Draw ==
Key

- Q = Qualifier
- WC = Wild card
- LL = Lucky loser
- Alt = Alternate
- ITF = ITF entry
- PR = Protected ranking
- SR = Special ranking
- SE = Special exempt
- JE = Junior exempt
- JR = Junior Accelerator Programme entrant
- CO = College Accelerator Programme entrant
- NG = Next Gen Accelerator Program entrant
- w/o = Walkover
- r = Retired
- d = Defaulted

First round
1	(Czech Republic) P Nouza (Czech Republic) A Paulson	6	7^{7}
Alt	(Czech Republic) H Bartoň (Czech Republic) M Krumich	4	6^{1}
(Czech Republic) J Forejtek (India) S Nagal	4	7	[13]
(Czech Republic) V Kopřiva (Czech Republic) J Pospíšil	6	5	[15]
4	(Argentina) FA Gómez (United Kingdom) M Willis	4	6	[10]
(Slovakia) M Karol (United States) T Kodat	6	4	[8]
(Brazil) M Pucinelli de Almeida (Brazil) JL Reis da Silva	7	1
(Slovakia) L Klein (Croatia) N Serdarušić	5	1^{r}
(France) C Bittoun Kouzmine (Ukraine) V Uzhylovskyi	6	6
(Italy) Federico Iannaccone; Denis Klok	1	2
WC	(Czech Republic) Matyáš Černý (Czech Republic) D Siniakov	5	4
3	(Austria) D Pichler (Ukraine) O Prihodko	7	6
(Czech Republic) Jiří Barnat (Czech Republic) M Vrbenský	5	6	[7]
(Czech Republic) R Jebavý (Czech Republic) J Veselý	7	3	[10]
(Israel) R Stepanov (United States) Tennyson Whiting	6^{3}	2
2	(Austria) N Oberleitner (Germany) T Sandkaulen	7^{7}	6

Quarterfinals
1	(Czech Republic) P Nouza (Czech Republic) A Paulson	6	6
(Czech Republic) V Kopřiva (Czech Republic) J Pospíšil	4	3
4	(Argentina) FA Gómez (United Kingdom) M Willis	w/o
(Brazil) M Pucinelli de Almeida (Brazil) JL Reis da Silva
(France) C Bittoun Kouzmine (Ukraine) V Uzhylovskyi	6	6
3	(Austria) D Pichler (Ukraine) O Prihodko	4	3
(Czech Republic) R Jebavý (Czech Republic) J Veselý	3	6^{6}
2	(Austria) N Oberleitner (Germany) T Sandkaulen	6	7^{8}

Semifinals
1	(Czech Republic) P Nouza (Czech Republic) A Paulson	6^{7}	7	[10]
4	(Argentina) FA Gómez (United Kingdom) M Willis	7^{9}	5	[7]
(France) C Bittoun Kouzmine (Ukraine) V Uzhylovskyi	6^{11}	5
2	(Austria) N Oberleitner (Germany) T Sandkaulen	7^{13}	7

Final
1	(Czech Republic) P Nouza (Czech Republic) A Paulson	6	6
2	(Austria) N Oberleitner (Germany) T Sandkaulen	3	4
