= 2013 Svijany Open – Doubles =

Doubles
- 2013 Svijany Open

Final
- Champions: (Australia) Rameez Junaid (Germany) Tim Pütz
- Runners-up: (Australia) Colin Ebelthite (Chinese Taipei) Lee Hsin-han
- Score: 6–0, 6–2

Events
Singles	Doubles
- Svijany Open

This was the first edition of the tournament.

Rameez Junaid and Tim Pütz won the title, defeating Colin Ebelthite and Lee Hsin-han 6–0, 6–2 in the final.

== Seeds ==
1. (Sweden) Andreas Siljeström / (Slovakia) Igor Zelenay (quarterfinals)
2. (Australia) Colin Ebelthite / (Chinese Taipei) Lee Hsin-han (final)
3. (Germany) Gero Kretschmer / (Germany) Alexander Satschko (semifinals)
4. (United States) Vahid Mirzadeh / (United States) Denis Zivkovic (quarterfinals)

== Draw ==
Key

- Q = Qualifier
- WC = Wild card
- LL = Lucky loser
- Alt = Alternate
- ITF = ITF entry
- PR = Protected ranking
- SR = Special ranking
- SE = Special exempt
- JE = Junior exempt
- JR = Junior Accelerator Programme entrant
- CO = College Accelerator Programme entrant
- NG = Next Gen Accelerator Program entrant
- w/o = Walkover
- r = Retired
- d = Defaulted

=== Draw ===
First round
1	(Sweden) A Siljeström (Slovakia) I Zelenay	6^{2}	6	[10]
(Czech Republic) Michal Konečný (Czech Republic) J Veselý	7^{7}	2	[4]
(Serbia) F Krajinović (Serbia) G Tošić	1	2
(Australia) R Junaid (Germany) T Pütz	6	6
3	(Germany) G Kretschmer (Germany) A Satschko	6	6
WC	(Czech Republic) Jan Kunčík (Czech Republic) Michal Schmid	3	2
(Netherlands) S Fransen (Australia) Chris Letcher	4	2
(Czech Republic) J Mertl (Ukraine) O Nedovyesov	6	6
(Finland) H Kontinen (Poland) M Kowalczyk	6	6
(Netherlands) Romano Frantzen (Netherlands) T Schoorel	3	4
WC	(Czech Republic) Lukáš Maršoun (Czech Republic) Dominik Süč	3	6^{3}
4	(United States) V Mirzadeh (United States) D Zivkovic	6	7^{7}
WC	(Czech Republic) Ľubomír Majšajdr (Czech Republic) David Prokop	6^{4}	6	[10]
(Bosnia and Herzegovina) D Džumhur (Slovakia) N Gombos	7^{7}	3	[6]
(Slovakia) I Klec (Slovakia) M Semjan	3	1
2	(Australia) C Ebelthite (Chinese Taipei) H-h Lee	6	6

Quarterfinals
1	(Sweden) A Siljeström (Slovakia) I Zelenay	6^{5}	7	[9]
(Australia) R Junaid (Germany) T Pütz	7	6^{4}	[11]
3	(Germany) G Kretschmer (Germany) A Satschko	6	6
(Czech Republic) J Mertl (Ukraine) O Nedovyesov	3	1
(Finland) H Kontinen (Poland) M Kowalczyk	6	7^{7}
4	(United States) V Mirzadeh (United States) D Zivkovic	1	6^{2}
WC	(Czech Republic) Ľ Majšajdr (Czech Republic) D Prokop	3	4
2	(Australia) C Ebelthite (Chinese Taipei) H-h Lee	6	6

Semifinals
(Australia) R Junaid (Germany) T Pütz	6	7
3	(Germany) G Kretschmer (Germany) A Satschko	2	5
(Finland) H Kontinen (Poland) M Kowalczyk	2	6	[4]
2	(Australia) C Ebelthite (Chinese Taipei) H-h Lee	6	3	[10]

Final
(Australia) R Junaid (Germany) T Pütz	6	6
2	(Australia) C Ebelthite (Chinese Taipei) H-h Lee	0	2
