= 2021 Svijany Open – Doubles =

Doubles
- 2021 Svijany Open

Final
- Champions: (Czech Republic) Roman Jebavý (Slovakia) Igor Zelenay
- Runners-up: (France) Geoffrey Blancaneaux (France) Maxime Janvier
- Score: 6–2, 6–7^{(6–8)}, [10–5]

Events
Singles	Doubles
← 2019 ·	Svijany Open	· 2022 →

Jonáš Forejtek and Michael Vrbenský were the defending champions but lost in the first round to Tallon Griekspoor and Bart Stevens.

Roman Jebavý and Igor Zelenay won the title after defeating Geoffrey Blancaneaux and Maxime Janvier 6–2, 6–7^{(6–8)}, [10–5] in the final.

== Seeds ==
1. (Australia) Marc Polmans / (Australia) Matt Reid (semifinals)
2. (Brazil) Fernando Romboli / (Spain) David Vega Hernández (quarterfinals)
3. (Czech Republic) Roman Jebavý / (Slovakia) Igor Zelenay (champions)
4. (India) Sriram Balaji / (India) Arjun Kadhe (quarterfinals)

== Draw ==
=== Key ===
- Q = Qualifier
- WC = Wild card
- LL = Lucky loser
- Alt = Alternate
- SE = Special exempt
- PR = Protected ranking
- ITF = ITF entry
- JE = Junior exempt
- w/o = Walkover
- r = Retired
- d = Defaulted
- SR = Special ranking

First round
1	(Australia) M Polmans (Australia) M Reid	6^{5}	6	[14]
(Italy) F Agamenone (Argentina) JP Ficovich	7^{7}	4	[12]
WC	(Czech Republic) J Forejtek (Czech Republic) M Vrbenský	3	6	[7]
(Netherlands) T Griekspoor (Netherlands) B Stevens	6	4	[10]
4	(India) S Balaji (India) A Kadhe	6	6
(Kazakhstan) D Popko (Ukraine) V Sachko	4	2
WC	(Czech Republic) A Paulson (Czech Republic) P Rikl	6	3	[12]
(France) G Blancaneaux (France) M Janvier	2	6	[14]
(Philippines) R Gonzales (United States) H Johnson	w/o
(Czech Republic) J Lehečka (Czech Republic) T Macháč
(Netherlands) R Haase (Slovakia) A Martin	4	2
3	(Czech Republic) R Jebavý (Slovakia) I Zelenay	6	6
(Poland) K Drzewiecki (Poland) K Majchrzak	6	6
WC	(Czech Republic) Lubomír Majšajdr (Czech Republic) Martin Zahrádka	2	1
(Czech Republic) D Svrčina (Czech Republic) J Veselý
2	(Brazil) F Romboli (Spain) D Vega Hernández	w/o

Quarterfinals
1	(Australia) M Polmans (Australia) M Reid	7	6^{4}	[10]
(Netherlands) T Griekspoor (Netherlands) B Stevens	5	7^{7}	[6]
4	(India) S Balaji (India) A Kadhe	5	4
(France) G Blancaneaux (France) M Janvier	7	6
(Philippines) R Gonzales (United States) H Johnson	6	4	[3]
3	(Czech Republic) R Jebavý (Slovakia) I Zelenay	4	6	[10]
(Poland) K Drzewiecki (Poland) K Majchrzak	7^{10}	7^{8}
2	(Brazil) F Romboli (Spain) D Vega Hernández	6^{8}	6^{6}

Semifinals
1	(Australia) M Polmans (Australia) M Reid	3	2
(France) G Blancaneaux (France) M Janvier	6	6
3	(Czech Republic) R Jebavý (Slovakia) I Zelenay	6	7^{8}
(Poland) K Drzewiecki (Poland) K Majchrzak	3	6^{6}

Final
(France) G Blancaneaux (France) M Janvier	2	7^{8}	[5]
3	(Czech Republic) R Jebavý (Slovakia) I Zelenay	6	6^{6}	[10]
