= 2013 Svijany Open – Singles =

Singles
- 2013 Svijany Open

Final
- Champion: (Czech Republic) Jiří Veselý
- Runner-up: (Argentina) Federico Delbonis
- Score: 6–7^{(2–7)}, 7–6^{(9–7)}, 6–4

Events
Singles	Doubles
- Svijany Open

This was the first edition of the event.

Jiří Veselý won the title, defeating Federico Delbonis in the final, 6–7^{(2–7)}, 7–6^{(9–7)}, 6–4.

== Seeds ==
1. (Argentina) Federico Delbonis (final)
2. (Czech Republic) Jiří Veselý (champion)
3. (Spain) Rubén Ramírez Hidalgo (second round, Retired)
4. (Slovenia) Blaž Kavčič (semifinals)
5. (Ukraine) Oleksandr Nedovyesov (second round)
6. (Italy) Thomas Fabbiano (quarterfinals)
7. (Czech Republic) Jan Mertl (quarterfinals)
8. (Germany) Björn Phau (first round)

== Draw ==
Key

- Q = Qualifier
- WC = Wild card
- LL = Lucky loser
- Alt = Alternate
- ITF = ITF entry
- PR = Protected ranking
- SR = Special ranking
- SE = Special exempt
- JE = Junior exempt
- JR = Junior Accelerator Programme entrant
- CO = College Accelerator Programme entrant
- NG = Next Gen Accelerator Program entrant
- w/o = Walkover
- r = Retired
- d = Defaulted

=== Finals ===
Semifinals
1	(Argentina) Federico Delbonis	6	6
4	(Slovenia) Blaž Kavčič	2	2
(Spain) Pere Riba	4	1
2	(Czech Republic) Jiří Veselý	6	6

Final
1	(Argentina) Federico Delbonis	7^{7}	6^{7}	4
2	(Czech Republic) Jiří Veselý	6^{2}	7^{9}	6

=== Top half ===
First round
1	(Argentina) F Delbonis	6	7^{8}
(Slovakia) M Mečíř	1	6^{6}
WC	(Netherlands) T Schoorel	6	6
Q	(Slovakia) I Klec	0	2
(Germany) T Pütz	6	7
(Moldova) R Albot	4	5
(Romania) V Crivoi	4	78	3
7	(Czech Republic) J Mertl	6	6^{6}	6
4	(Slovenia) B Kavčič	4	6	6
Alt	(Serbia) F Krajinović	6	2	3
(Ukraine) I Sergeyev	3	7	7
(Czech Republic) Michal Konečný	6	5	5
(Italy) S Vagnozzi	7	6
Q	(United Kingdom) E Corrie	5	2
Q	(Poland) G Panfil	1	6	6
8	(Germany) B Phau	6	3	2

Second round
1	(Argentina) F Delbonis	6	6
WC	(Netherlands) T Schoorel	5	3
(Germany) T Pütz	3	6	2
7	(Czech Republic) J Mertl	6	1	6
4	(Slovenia) B Kavčič	6	6
(Ukraine) I Sergeyev	4	0
(Italy) S Vagnozzi	2	5
Q	(Poland) G Panfil	6	7

Quarterfinals
1	(Argentina) F Delbonis	6	6
7	(Czech Republic) J Mertl	2	3
4	(Slovenia) B Kavčič	7	6
Q	(Poland) G Panfil	5	2

Semifinals
1	(Argentina) F Delbonis	6	6
4	(Slovenia) B Kavčič	2	2

=== Bottom half ===
First round
5	(Ukraine) O Nedovyesov	6	6
WC	(Czech Republic) Michal Schmid	2	3
(Slovakia) M Semjan	1	1
(Spain) P Riba	6	6
(Spain) G Olaso	2	6	7^{8}
(Bosnia and Herzegovina) D Džumhur	6	2	6^{6}
(Czech Republic) D Lojda	6^{6}	1
4	(Spain) R Ramírez Hidalgo	7^{8}	6
6	(Italy) T Fabbiano	7^{7}	6
Q	(Czech Republic) M Michalička	6^{4}	4
(Italy) G Naso	4	6^{3}
(Slovakia) N Gombos	6	^{7}
(Slovakia) J Kovalík	6	3	4
WC	(Czech Republic) A Pavlásek	3	6	6
WC	(Czech Republic) Jan Kunčík	1	0
2	(Czech Republic) J Veselý	6	6

Second round
5	(Ukraine) O Nedovyesov	6	6^{5}	6^{3}
(Spain) P Riba	2	7^{7}	7^{7}
(Spain) G Olaso	5
3	(Spain) R Ramírez Hidalgo	1^{r}
6	(Italy) T Fabbiano	6	7^{7}
(Slovakia) N Gombos	4	6^{2}
WC	(Czech Republic) A Pavlásek	4	2
2	(Czech Republic) J Veselý	6	6

Quarterfinals
(Spain) P Riba	6	6
(Spain) G Olaso	3	3
6	(Italy) T Fabbiano	3	6^{4}
2	(Czech Republic) J Veselý	6	7^{7}

Semifinals
(Spain) P Riba	1	4
2	(Czech Republic) J Veselý	6	6
