= 2014 Svijany Open – Doubles =

Doubles
- 2014 Svijany Open

Final
- Champions: (Czech Republic) Roman Jebavý (Czech Republic) Jaroslav Pospíšil
- Runners-up: (Philippines) Ruben Gonzales (United Kingdom) Sean Thornley
- Score: 6–4, 6–3

Events
Singles	Doubles
- Svijany Open

Roman Jebavý and Jaroslav Pospíšil won the title, beating Ruben Gonzales and Sean Thornley 6–4, 6–3

== Seeds ==
1. (Germany) Dominik Meffert / (Germany) Tim Puetz (semifinals)
2. (Czech Republic) Roman Jebavý / (Czech Republic) Jaroslav Pospíšil (champions)
3. (Argentina) Facundo Argüello / (Uruguay) Ariel Behar (semifinals, withdrew)
4. (Philippines) Ruben Gonzales / (United Kingdom) Sean Thornley (final)

== Draw ==
Key

- Q = Qualifier
- WC = Wild card
- LL = Lucky loser
- Alt = Alternate
- ITF = ITF entry
- PR = Protected ranking
- SR = Special ranking
- SE = Special exempt
- JE = Junior exempt
- JR = Junior Accelerator Programme entrant
- CO = College Accelerator Programme entrant
- NG = Next Gen Accelerator Program entrant
- w/o = Walkover
- r = Retired
- d = Defaulted

=== Draw ===
First round
1	(Germany) D Meffert (Germany) T Puetz	7	6
WC	(Czech Republic) Lukas Polacek (Czech Republic) David Pultr	5	1
(Slovakia) N Gomboš (Slovakia) I Zelenay	6	6
WC	(Czech Republic) D Reček (Czech Republic) David Simunek	0	0
4	(Philippines) R Gonzales (United Kingdom) S Thornley	7^{7}	6^{7}	[10]
(Brazil) T Monteiro (Chinese Taipei) T-h Yang	6^{3}	7^{9}	[6]
(Czech Republic) M Michalička (Czech Republic) Dominik Suc	6	6
(France) G Sakharov (Ukraine) A Smirnov	4	4
WC	(Czech Republic) Tomas Frommel (Czech Republic) Lukas Marsoun	4	4
(Netherlands) M Middelkoop (Netherlands) B Westerhof	6	6
(Czech Republic) Jan Kuncik (Czech Republic) Lubomir Majsajdr	6	5	[11]
3	(Argentina) F Argüello (Uruguay) A Behar	2	7	[13]
(Australia) R Agar (Austria) S Bader	5	3
(United States) Erik Elliott (United Kingdom) D Walsh	7	6
(Spain) R Carballés Baena (Austria) Lukas Weinhandl	1	0
2	(Czech Republic) R Jebavý (Czech Republic) J Pospíšil	6	6

Quarterfinals
1	(Germany) D Meffert (Germany) T Puetz	6	6
(Slovakia) N Gomboš (Slovakia) I Zelenay	4	2
4	(Philippines) R Gonzales (United Kingdom) S Thornley	7	6
(Czech Republic) M Michalička (Czech Republic) D Suc	5	1
(Netherlands) M Middelkoop (Netherlands) B Westerhof	3	7^{7}	[10]
3	(Argentina) F Argüello (Uruguay) A Behar	6	6^{3}	[12]
(United States) E Elliott (United Kingdom) D Walsh	3	3
2	(Czech Republic) R Jebavý (Czech Republic) J Pospíšil	6	6

Semifinals
1	(Germany) D Meffert (Germany) T Puetz	5	1
4	(Philippines) R Gonzales (United Kingdom) S Thornley	7	6
3	(Argentina) F Argüello (Uruguay) A Behar
2	(Czech Republic) R Jebavý (Czech Republic) J Pospíšil	w/o

Final
4	(Philippines) R Gonzales (United Kingdom) S Thornley	4	3
2	(Czech Republic) R Jebavý (Czech Republic) J Pospíšil	6	6
