= 2025 Svijany Open – Singles =

Singles
- 2025 Svijany Open

Final
- Champion: (Peru) Gonzalo Bueno
- Runner-up: (Argentina) Genaro Alberto Olivieri
- Score: 6–2, 2–0 ret.

Events
Singles	Doubles
- Svijany Open

Hugo Dellien was the defending champion but chose not to defend his title.

Gonzalo Bueno won the title after Genaro Alberto Olivieri retired while trailing 2–6, 0–2 in the final.

== Seeds ==
1. (Argentina) Federico Coria (second round)
2. (Argentina) Santiago Rodríguez Taverna (first round)
3. (United Kingdom) Jack Pinnington Jones (quarterfinals)
4. (Italy) Stefano Travaglia (second round)
5. (Argentina) Alex Barrena (second round, retired)
6. (Argentina) Andrea Collarini (quarterfinals)
7. (France) Sascha Gueymard Wayenburg (second round)
8. (France) Geoffrey Blancaneaux (first round)

== Draw ==
Key

- Q = Qualifier
- WC = Wild card
- LL = Lucky loser
- Alt = Alternate
- ITF = ITF entry
- PR = Protected ranking
- SR = Special ranking
- SE = Special exempt
- JE = Junior exempt
- JR = Junior Accelerator Programme entrant
- CO = College Accelerator Programme entrant
- NG = Next Gen Accelerator Program entrant
- w/o = Walkover
- r = Retired
- d = Defaulted

=== Finals ===
Semifinals
(Poland) Daniel Michalski	3	6^{4}
(Argentina) Genaro Alberto Olivieri	6	7^{7}
(Peru) Gonzalo Bueno	6	6
(Slovakia) Norbert Gombos	4	0

Final
(Argentina) Genaro Alberto Olivieri	2	0^{r}
(Peru) Gonzalo Bueno	6	2

=== Top half ===
First round
1	(Argentina) F Coria	6	3	6
Q	(Czech Republic) M Krumich	2	6	3
(Germany) P Zahraj	2	1
(Poland) D Michalski	6	6
(Monaco) V Vacherot	7^{7}	6
WC	(Czech Republic) Petr Brunclík	6^{3}	4
Alt	(Italy) R Brancaccio	2	6	3
7	(France) S Gueymard Wayenburg	6	2	6
3	(United Kingdom) J Pinnington Jones	4	6	6
Q	(Romania) Sebastian Gima	6	3	1
(Bolivia) M Dellien	3	5
Q	(Czech Republic) Jakub Nicod	6	7
Q	(Slovakia) M Karol	3	2
(Argentina) GA Olivieri	6	6
WC	(Czech Republic) Jonáš Kučera	2	3
5	(Argentina) A Barrena	6	6

Second round
1	(Argentina) F Coria	5	6	4
(Poland) D Michalski	7	1	6
(Monaco) V Vacherot	6^{6}	6	7^{7}
7	(France) S Gueymard Wayenburg	7^{8}	3	6^{3}
3	(United Kingdom) J Pinnington Jones	7^{7}	6
Q	(Czech Republic) J Nicod	6^{0}	4
(Argentina) GA Olivieri	6	1
5	(Argentina) A Barrena	0	0^{r}

Quarterfinals
(Poland) D Michalski	7^{7}	7^{7}
(Monaco) V Vacherot	6^{3}	6^{2}
3	(United Kingdom) J Pinnington Jones	6	2	3
(Argentina) GA Olivieri	2	6	6

Semifinals
(Poland) D Michalski	3	6^{4}
(Argentina) GA Olivieri	6	7^{7}

=== Bottom half ===
First round
6	(Argentina) A Collarini	6	7^{8}
PR	(Czech Republic) A Paulson	4	6^{6}
(Belgium) M Geerts	6	6^{2}	3
PR	(Germany) C-M Stebe	4	7^{7}	6
(Peru) G Bueno	6^{3}	6	7
Alt	(Czech Republic) H Bartoň	7^{7}	3	5
Q	(Slovakia) A Molčan	6	5	6^{3}
4	(Italy) S Travaglia	4	7	7^{7}
8	(France) G Blancaneaux	6	5	1
(Slovakia) N Gombos	1	7	6
NG	(Germany) D Dedura	6	5	6
(Italy) J Berrettini	1	7	3
(Slovakia) A Martin	7^{7}	6^{3}	6
Q	(Finland) E Vasa	6^{4}	7^{7}	2
WC	(Czech Republic) M Mrva	6	6
2	(Argentina) S Rodríguez Taverna	2	3

Second round
6	(Argentina) A Collarini	6	6
PR	(Germany) C-M Stebe	4	2
(Peru) G Bueno	6	6
4	(Italy) S Travaglia	0	2
(Slovakia) N Gombos	7^{7}	5	7
NG	(Germany) D Dedura	6^{5}	7	5
(Slovakia) A Martin	6	4	4
WC	(Czech Republic) M Mrva	3	6	6

Quarterfinals
6	(Argentina) A Collarini	5	2
(Peru) G Bueno	7	6
(Slovakia) N Gombos	7	4	6
WC	(Czech Republic) M Mrva	5	6	1

Semifinals
(Peru) G Bueno	6	6
(Slovakia) N Gombos	4	0
