= 2019 Svijany Open – Singles =

Singles
- 2019 Svijany Open

Final
- Champion: (Serbia) Nikola Milojević
- Runner-up: (Brazil) Rogério Dutra Silva
- Score: 6–3, 3–6, 6–4

Events
Singles	Doubles
- Svijany Open

Andrej Martin was the defending champion but lost in the second round to Alex Molčan.

Nikola Milojević won the title after defeating Rogério Dutra Silva 6–3, 3–6, 6–4 in the final.

== Seeds ==
All seeds receive a bye into the second round.

1. (Slovakia) Andrej Martin (second round)
2. (Hungary) Attila Balázs (second round)
3. (Czech Republic) Jiří Veselý (quarterfinals)
4. (Italy) Filippo Baldi (third round)
5. (United Kingdom) Jay Clarke (third round)
6. (Italy) Federico Gaio (second round)
7. (Portugal) João Domingues (quarterfinals)
8. (Argentina) Federico Coria (third round)
9. (Argentina) Facundo Argüello (withdrew)
10. (Italy) Roberto Marcora (third round)
11. (Serbia) Nikola Milojević (champion)
12. (Kazakhstan) Aleksandr Nedovyesov (second round)
13. (Argentina) Marco Trungelliti (second round)
14. (Germany) Tobias Kamke (third round)
15. (Brazil) Rogério Dutra Silva (final)
16. (Spain) Daniel Gimeno Traver (third round)

== Draw ==
Key

- Q = Qualifier
- WC = Wild card
- LL = Lucky loser
- Alt = Alternate
- ITF = ITF entry
- PR = Protected ranking
- SR = Special ranking
- SE = Special exempt
- JE = Junior exempt
- JR = Junior Accelerator Programme entrant
- CO = College Accelerator Programme entrant
- NG = Next Gen Accelerator Program entrant
- w/o = Walkover
- r = Retired
- d = Defaulted

=== Finals ===
Quarterfinals
(Slovakia) Alex Molčan	4	2
WC	(Czech Republic) Tomáš Macháč	6	6
15	(Brazil) Rogério Dutra Silva	6^{5}	6	2
(Croatia) Nino Serdarušić	7^{7}	3	0^{r}
11	(Serbia) Nikola Milojević	7^{7}	1	6
3	(Czech Republic) Jiří Veselý	6^{2}	6	2
7	(Portugal) João Domingues	6	4	6^{4}
Q	(Czech Republic) Pavel Nejedlý	1	6	7^{7}

Semifinals
WC	(Czech Republic) Tomáš Macháč	3	0
15	(Brazil) Rogério Dutra Silva	6	6
11	(Serbia) Nikola Milojević	6	4	7
Q	(Czech Republic) Pavel Nejedlý	0	6	5

Final
15	(Brazil) Rogério Dutra Silva	3	6	4
11	(Serbia) Nikola Milojević	6	3	6

=== Top half ===
==== Section 1 ====
First round
(Slovakia) A Molčan	6	6
WC	(Czech Republic) D Poljak	1	1
(France) M Guinard	7^{7}	6
ITF	(France) S Doumbia	6^{4}	2
WC	(Czech Republic) T Macháč	7^{7}	6
(Germany) J Lenz	6^{4}	1
(France) TK Wang	4	5
Q	(Czech Republic) J Pospíšil	6	7

Second round
1	(Slovakia) A Martin	6	0	5
(Slovakia) A Molčan	3	6	7
(France) M Guinard	6	6
13	(Argentina) M Trungelliti	3	4
12	(Kazakhstan) A Nedovyesov	3	2
WC	(Czech Republic) T Macháč	6	6
Q	(Czech Republic) J Pospíšil	4	6	7
6	(Italy) F Gaio	6	3	5

Third round
(Slovakia) A Molčan	4	6	6
(France) M Guinard	6	2	2
WC	(Czech Republic) T Macháč	6	6
Q	(Czech Republic) J Pospíšil	4	4

Quarterfinals
(Slovakia) A Molčan	4	2
WC	(Czech Republic) T Macháč	6	6

==== Section 2 ====
First round
(Romania) D Dima	6	3	6
(India) S Mukund	4	6	0
WC	(Czech Republic) P Nouza	4
(Italy) GM Moroni	5^{r}
(Croatia) N Serdarušić	5	6	6
(Argentina) R Olivo	7	3	4
(France) G Blancaneaux	6	6
ITF	(Germany) Peter Heller	3	3

Second round
4	(Italy) F Baldi	6	6^{2}	6
(Romania) D Dima	3	7^{7}	1
WC	(Czech Republic) P Nouza	3	2
15	(Brazil) R Dutra Silva	6	6
Alt	(France) F Reboul	3	6	6^{5}
(Croatia) N Serdarušić	6	2	7^{7}
(France) G Blancaneaux	6^{6}	3
5	(United Kingdom) J Clarke	7^{8}	6

Third round
4	(Italy) F Baldi	6^{4}	1
15	(Brazil) R Dutra Silva	7^{7}	6
(Croatia) N Serdarušić	4	6	6
5	(United Kingdom) J Clarke	6	0	1

Quarterfinals
15	(Brazil) R Dutra Silva	6^{5}	6	2
(Croatia) N Serdarušić	7^{7}	3	0^{r}

=== Bottom half ===
==== Section 3 ====
First round
(Argentina) A Collarini	4	6	1
Alt	(Czech Republic) M Vrbenský	6	3	6
(Spain) C Taberner	7^{7}	2	6
WC	(Czech Republic) J Forejtek	6^{2}	6	3
ITF	(Egypt) K-M Maamoun	6	6
(Czech Republic) A Pavlásek	3	3
(Hungary) Z Piros	6	4	6
SE	(Spain) M Vilella Martínez	1	6	4

Second round
8	(Argentina) F Coria	6	6
Alt	(Czech Republic) M Vrbenský	4	2
(Spain) C Taberner	7	3	6^{2}
11	(Serbia) N Milojević	5	6	7^{7}
14	(Germany) T Kamke	6	6
ITF	(Egypt) K-M Maamoun	2	2
(Hungary) Z Piros	3	1
3	(Czech Republic) J Veselý	6	6

Third round
8	(Argentina) F Coria	6^{6}	3
11	(Serbia) N Milojević	7^{8}	6
14	(Germany) T Kamke	2	1
3	(Czech Republic) J Veselý	6	6

Quarterfinals
11	(Serbia) N Milojević	7^{7}	1	6
3	(Czech Republic) J Veselý	6^{2}	6	2

==== Section 4 ====
First round
(Czech Republic) V Šafránek	6	6
ITF	(Czech Republic) V Kopřiva	3	3
WC	(Czech Republic) J Lehečka	6	6
(Belarus) U Ignatik	3	4
ITF	(France) C Denolly	4	6	3
(Germany) L Wessels	6	1	6
LL	(Czech Republic) Lubomír Majšajdr	5	6^{2}
Q	(Czech Republic) Pavel Nejedlý	7	7^{7}

Second round
7	(Portugal) J Domingues	6	6
(Czech Republic) V Šafránek	3	3
WC	(Czech Republic) J Lehečka	7^{7}	5	4
10	(Italy) R Marcora	6^{5}	7	6
16	(Spain) D Gimeno Traver	6	3	6
(Germany) L Wessels	4	6	3
Q	(Czech Republic) P Nejedlý	6	4	7^{7}
2	(Hungary) A Balázs	4	6	6^{2}

Third round
7	(Portugal) J Domingues	2	6	6
10	(Italy) R Marcora	6	4	3
16	(Spain) D Gimeno Traver	4	6	1
Q	(Czech Republic) P Nejedlý	6	4	6

Quarterfinals
7	(Portugal) J Domingues	6	4	6^{4}
Q	(Czech Republic) P Nejedlý	1	6	7^{7}
