= 2025 Svijany Open =

- Date: 28 July – 3 August
- Edition: 12th
- Location: Liberec, Czech Republic

Champions

Singles
- (Peru) Gonzalo Bueno

Doubles
- (Czech Republic) Andrew Paulson / (Czech Republic) Michael Vrbenský
- Svijany Open

The 2025 Svijany Open was a professional tennis tournament played on clay courts. It was the 12th edition of the tournament which was part of the 2025 ATP Challenger Tour. It took place in Liberec, Czech Republic between 28 July and 3 August 2025.

== Singles main-draw entrants ==
=== Seeds ===
| Country | Player | Rank^{1} | Seed |
|---|---|---|---|
| ARG | Federico Coria | 151 | 1 |
| ARG | Santiago Rodríguez Taverna | 187 | 2 |
| GBR | Jack Pinnington Jones | 195 | 3 |
| ITA | Stefano Travaglia | 230 | 4 |
| ARG | Alex Barrena | 233 | 5 |
| ARG | Andrea Collarini | 235 | 6 |
| FRA | Sascha Gueymard Wayenburg | 249 | 7 |
| FRA | Geoffrey Blancaneaux | 257 | 8 |

- ^{1} Rankings are as of 21 July 2025.

=== Other entrants ===
The following players received wildcards into the singles main draw:

- (Czech Republic) Petr Brunclík
- (Czech Republic) Jonáš Kučera
- (Czech Republic) Maxim Mrva

The following players received entry into the singles main draw using protected rankings:

- (Czech Republic) Andrew Paulson
- (Germany) Cedrik-Marcel Stebe

The following player received entry into the singles main draw through the Next Gen Accelerator programme:

- (Germany) Diego Dedura

The following players received entry into the singles main draw as alternates:

- (Czech Republic) Hynek Bartoň
- (Italy) Raúl Brancaccio

The following players received entry from the qualifying draw:

- (Romania) Sebastian Gima
- (Slovakia) Miloš Karol
- (Czech Republic) Martin Krumich
- (Slovakia) Alex Molčan
- (Czech Republic) Jakub Nicod
- (Finland) Eero Vasa

== Champions ==
=== Singles ===
- (Peru) Gonzalo Bueno def. (Argentina) Genaro Alberto Olivieri 6–2, 2–0 ret.

=== Doubles ===
- (Czech Republic) Andrew Paulson / (Czech Republic) Michael Vrbenský def. (Czech Republic) Jiří Barnat / (Czech Republic) Filip Duda 6–4, 6–1.
