= 2021 Svijany Open =

- Date: 2–8 August
- Edition: 8th
- Location: Liberec, Czech Republic

Champions

Singles
- (Slovakia) Alex Molčan

Doubles
- (Czech Republic) Roman Jebavý / (Slovakia) Igor Zelenay
- Svijany Open

The 2021 Svijany Open was a professional tennis tournament played on clay courts. It was the 8th edition of the tournament which was part of the 2021 ATP Challenger Tour. It took place in Liberec, Czech Republic between 2 and 8 August 2021.

== Singles main-draw entrants ==
=== Seeds ===
Country	Player	Rank^{1}	Seed
~~CZE~~	~~Jiří Veselý~~	~~86~~	~~1~~
NED	Tallon Griekspoor	107	2
POL	Kamil Majchrzak	114	3
SVK	Andrej Martin	116	4
NED	Botic van de Zandschulp	126	5
AUS	Marc Polmans	144	6
CZE	Tomáš Macháč	148	7
SVK	Alex Molčan	150	8

- ^{1} Rankings are as of 26 July 2021.

=== Other entrants ===
The following players received wildcards into the singles main draw:

- (Czech Republic) Jonáš Forejtek
- (Czech Republic) Dalibor Svrčina
- (Czech Republic) Michael Vrbenský

The following player received entry into the singles main draw using a protected ranking:

- (Austria) Gerald Melzer

The following player received entry into the singles main draw as a special exempt:

- (Netherlands) Tim van Rijthoven

The following player received entry into the singles main draw as an alternate:

- (Tunisia) Malek Jaziri

The following players received entry from the qualifying draw:

- (France) Evan Furness
- (Serbia) Nikola Milojević
- (United States) Alexander Ritschard
- (Czech Republic) Daniel Siniakov

The following player received entry as a lucky loser:

- (Spain) David Vega Hernández

== Champions ==
=== Singles ===
- (Slovakia) Alex Molčan def. (Czech Republic) Tomáš Macháč 6–0, 6–1.

=== Doubles ===
- (Czech Republic) Roman Jebavý / (Slovakia) Igor Zelenay def. (France) Geoffrey Blancaneaux / (France) Maxime Janvier 6–2, 6–7^{(6–8)}, [10–5].
