= 2016 Svijany Open – Doubles =

Doubles
- 2016 Svijany Open

Final
- Champion: (France) Jonathan Eysseric (Brazil) André Ghem
- Runner-up: (Uruguay) Ariel Behar (Croatia) Dino Marcan
- Score: 6–0, 6–4

Events
| Singles | Doubles |
- Svijany Open

Andrej Martin and Hans Podlipnik were the defending champions but chose not to participate.

Jonathan Eysseric and André Ghem won the title after defeating Ariel Behar and Dino Marcan 6–0, 6–4 in the final.

== Seeds ==
1. (Germany) Andre Begemann / (Austria) Julian Knowle (first round)
2. (Uruguay) Ariel Behar / (Croatia) Dino Marcan (final)
3. (Austria) Maximilian Neuchrist / (Austria) Tristan-Samuel Weissborn (semifinals)
4. (Russia) Mikhail Elgin / (Belarus) Andrei Vasilevski (quarterfinals)

== Draw ==
Key

- Q = Qualifier
- WC = Wild card
- LL = Lucky loser
- Alt = Alternate
- ITF = ITF entry
- PR = Protected ranking
- SR = Special ranking
- SE = Special exempt
- JE = Junior exempt
- JR = Junior Accelerator Programme entrant
- CO = College Accelerator Programme entrant
- NG = Next Gen Accelerator Program entrant
- w/o = Walkover
- r = Retired
- d = Defaulted

First round
1 | (Germany) A Begemann (Austria) J Knowle | 6 | 2 | [7]
(Czech Republic) Z Kolář (Czech Republic) Robin Staněk | 4 | 6 | [10]
WC | (Czech Republic) R Jebavý (Czech Republic) Dominik Süč | 4 | 3
(Poland) M Kowalczyk (Poland) K Majchrzak | 6 | 6
4 | (Russia) M Elgin (Belarus) A Vasilevski | 6 | 6
Alt | (Sweden) M Eriksson (Sweden) M Sekulic | 1 | 4
Alt | (Belgium) G Gigounon (France) A Michon | 6^{3} | 6 | [9]
(France) J Eysseric (Brazil) A Ghem | 7^{7} | 4 | [11]
(Poland) T Bednarek (Romania) A Ungur | 2 | 6^{8}
WC | (Czech Republic) L Dlouhý (Austria) J Melzer | 6 | 7^{10}
(Belgium) K Coppejans (Belgium) J De Loore | 6^{6} | 4
3 | (Austria) M Neuchrist (Austria) T-S Weissborn | 7^{8} | 6
(Netherlands) S Arends (Poland) A Majchrowicz | 6 | 6
WC | (Czech Republic) L'ubomír Majšajdr (Czech Republic) Martin Zahrádka | 1 | 3
(Kazakhstan) D Popko (Russia) A Vatutin | 2 | 4
2 | (Uruguay) A Behar (Croatia) D Marcan | 6 | 6

Quarterfinals
(Czech Republic) Z Kolář (Czech Republic) R Staněk | 3 | 2
(Poland) M Kowalczyk (Poland) K Majchrzak | 6 | 6
4 | (Russia) M Elgin (Belarus) A Vasilevski | 3 | 6 | [7]
(France) J Eysseric (Brazil) A Ghem | 6 | 3 | [10]
WC | (Czech Republic) L Dlouhý (Austria) J Melzer | 4 | 6 | [4]
3 | (Austria) M Neuchrist (Austria) T-S Weissborn | 6 | 3 | [10]
(Netherlands) S Arends (Poland) A Majchrowicz | 4 | 5
2 | (Uruguay) A Behar (Croatia) D Marcan | 6 | 7

Semifinals
(Poland) M Kowalczyk (Poland) K Majchrzak | 3 | 6^{3}
(France) J Eysseric (Brazil) A Ghem | 6 | 7^{7}
3 | (Austria) M Neuchrist (Austria) T-S Weissborn | 4 | 6^{5}
2 | (Uruguay) A Behar (Croatia) D Marcan | 6 | 7^{7}

Final
(France) J Eysseric (Brazil) A Ghem | 6 | 6
2 | (Uruguay) A Behar (Croatia) D Marcan | 0 | 4
