= 2013 Svijany Open =

- Date: 29 July – 4 August
- Edition: 1st
- Location: Liberec, Czech Republic

Champions

Singles
- (Czech Republic) Jiří Veselý

Doubles
- (Australia) Rameez Junaid / (Germany) Tim Pütz
- Svijany Open

The 2013 Svijany Open was a professional tennis tournament played on clay courts. It was the 1st edition of the tournament which was part of the 2013 ATP Challenger Tour. It took place in Liberec, Czech Republic between 29 July and 4 August 2013.

== ATP entrants ==
=== Seeds ===
Country	Player	Rank^{1}	Seed
ARG	Federico Delbonis	65	1
CZE	Jiří Veselý	98	2
ESP	Rubén Ramírez Hidalgo	110	3
SLO	Blaž Kavčič	127	4
UKR	Oleksandr Nedovyesov	151	5
ITA	Thomas Fabbiano	178	6
CZE	Jan Mertl	184	7
GER	Björn Phau	189	8

- ^{1} Rankings are as of July 22, 2013.

=== Other entrants ===
The following players received wildcards into the singles main draw:

- (Czech Republic) Michal Konečný
- (Czech Republic) Michal Schmid
- (Czech Republic) Adam Pavlásek
- (Czech Republic) Jan Kunčík

The following players received entry as an Alternate

- (Serbia) Filip Krajinović
- (Netherlands) Thomas Schoorel

The following players received entry from the qualifying draw:

- (United Kingdom) Edward Corrie
- (Slovakia) Ivo Klec
- (Czech Republic) Marek Michalička
- (Poland) Grzegorz Panfil

== Champions ==
=== Singles ===
- (Czech Republic) Jiří Veselý def. (Argentina) Federico Delbonis 6–7^{(2–7)}, 7–6^{(9–7)}, 6–4

=== Doubles ===
- (Australia) Rameez Junaid / (Germany) Tim Pütz def. (Australia) Colin Ebelthite / (Chinese Taipei) Lee Hsin-han 6–0, 6–2
