= 2022 Svijany Open =

- Date: 1–7 August
- Edition: 9th
- Location: Liberec, Czech Republic

Champions

Singles
- (Czech Republic) Jiří Lehečka

Doubles
- (Austria) Neil Oberleitner / (Austria) Philipp Oswald
- Svijany Open

The 2022 Svijany Open was a professional tennis tournament played on clay courts. It was the 9th edition of the tournament which was part of the 2022 ATP Challenger Tour. It took place in Liberec, Czech Republic between 1 and 7 August 2022.

== Singles main-draw entrants ==
=== Seeds ===
| Country | Player | Rank^{1} | Seed |
|---|---|---|---|
| CZE | Jiří Lehečka | 68 | 1 |
| POR | Nuno Borges | 115 | 2 |
| SVK | Norbert Gombos | 117 | 3 |
| CZE | Tomáš Macháč | 138 | 4 |
| AUT | Jurij Rodionov | 145 | 5 |
| FRA | Manuel Guinard | 148 | 6 |
| CZE | Vít Kopřiva | 159 | 7 |
| ~~AUT~~ | ~~Gerald Melzer~~ | ~~188~~ | ~~8~~ |

- ^{1} Rankings are as of 25 July 2022.

=== Other entrants ===
The following players received wildcards into the singles main draw:

- (Czech Republic) Andrew Paulson
- (Czech Republic) Daniel Siniakov
- (Czech Republic) Michael Vrbenský

The following player received entry into the singles main draw using a protected ranking:

- (Portugal) Pedro Sousa

The following player received entry into the singles main draw as an alternate:

- (Finland) Otto Virtanen

The following players received entry from the qualifying draw:

- (France) Giovanni Mpetshi Perricard
- (India) Sumit Nagal
- (Austria) Lukas Neumayer
- (Czech Republic) Petr Nouza
- (Israel) Yshai Oliel
- (Kazakhstan) Denis Yevseyev

The following player received entry as a lucky loser:

- (Ukraine) Vitaliy Sachko

== Champions ==
=== Singles ===
- (Czech Republic) Jiří Lehečka def. (Spain) Nicolás Álvarez Varona 6–4, 6–4.

=== Doubles ===
- (Austria) Neil Oberleitner / (Austria) Philipp Oswald def. (Czech Republic) Roman Jebavý / (Czech Republic) Adam Pavlásek 7–6^{(7–5)}, 6–2.
