= 2021 Svijany Open – Singles =

Singles
- 2021 Svijany Open

Final
- Champion: (Slovakia) Alex Molčan
- Runner-up: (Czech Republic) Tomáš Macháč
- Score: 6–0, 6–1

Events
Singles	Doubles
- Svijany Open

Nikola Milojević was the defending champion but lost in the second round to Tomáš Macháč.

Alex Molčan won the title after defeating Macháč 6–0, 6–1 in the final.

== Seeds ==
1. (Czech Republic) Jiří Veselý (withdrew)
2. (Netherlands) Tallon Griekspoor (first round)
3. (Poland) Kamil Majchrzak (quarterfinals)
4. (Slovakia) Andrej Martin (first round)
5. (Netherlands) Botic van de Zandschulp (semifinals)
6. (Australia) Marc Polmans (quarterfinals)
7. (Czech Republic) Tomáš Macháč (final)
8. (Slovakia) Alex Molčan (champion)

== Draw ==
Key

- Q = Qualifier
- WC = Wild card
- LL = Lucky loser
- Alt = Alternate
- ITF = ITF entry
- PR = Protected ranking
- SR = Special ranking
- SE = Special exempt
- JE = Junior exempt
- JR = Junior Accelerator Programme entrant
- CO = College Accelerator Programme entrant
- NG = Next Gen Accelerator Program entrant
- w/o = Walkover
- r = Retired
- d = Defaulted

=== Finals ===
Semifinals
Alt	(Tunisia) Malek Jaziri	1	0
8	(Slovakia) Alex Molčan	6	6
7	(Czech Republic) Tomáš Macháč	6	6
5	(Netherlands) Botic van de Zandschulp	2	2

Final
8	(Slovakia) Alex Molčan	6	6
7	(Czech Republic) Tomáš Macháč	0	1

=== Top half ===
First round
LL	(Spain) D Vega Hernández	1	2
Alt	(Tunisia) M Jaziri	6	6
(Australia) A Vukic	2	5
(Slovakia) F Horanský	6	7
(Germany) M Marterer	6	6
(India) S Nagal	4	3
WC	(Czech Republic) M Vrbenský	7^{7}	2	5
6	(Australia) M Polmans	6^{5}	6	7
3	(Poland) K Majchrzak	6	6
(Kazakhstan) D Popko	2	3
(Argentina) JP Ficovich	4	4
(Egypt) M Safwat	6	6
WC	(Czech Republic) J Forejtek	6^{4}	2
WC	(Czech Republic) D Svrčina	7^{7}	6
(Netherlands) R Haase	1	4
8	(Slovakia) A Molčan	6	6

Second round
Alt	(Tunisia) M Jaziri	6	6
(Slovakia) F Horanský	4	3
(Germany) M Marterer	4	4
6	(Australia) M Polmans	6	6
3	(Poland) K Majchrzak	6	6
(Egypt) M Safwat	2	2
WC	(Czech Republic) D Svrčina	2	1
8	(Slovakia) A Molčan	6	6

Quarterfinals
Alt	(Tunisia) M Jaziri	6	6
6	(Australia) M Polmans	2	4
3	(Poland) K Majchrzak	6^{3}	3
8	(Slovakia) A Molčan	7^{7}	6

Semifinals
Alt	(Tunisia) M Jaziri	1	0
8	(Slovakia) A Molčan	6	6

=== Bottom half ===
First round
7	(Czech Republic) T Macháč	3	6	6
(France) E Couacaud	6	3	3
Q	(Serbia) N Milojević	7	6
Q	(Czech Republic) D Siniakov	5	0
Q	(France) E Furness	3	6	6
SE	(Netherlands) T van Rijthoven	6	4	2
PR	(Austria) G Melzer	6	5	6
4	(Slovakia) A Martin	3	7	4
5	(Netherlands) B van de Zandschulp	6	7
(Ukraine) V Sachko	3	5
(France) M Janvier	3	4
(Slovakia) L Klein	6	6
Q	(United States) A Ritschard	6	3	6
(Czech Republic) J Lehečka	4	6	1
(Croatia) B Gojo	6	6
2	(Netherlands) T Griekspoor	4	3

Second round
7	(Czech Republic) T Macháč	6	7^{9}
Q	(Serbia) N Milojević	2	6^{7}
Q	(France) E Furness	4	2
PR	(Austria) G Melzer	6	6
5	(Netherlands) B van de Zandschulp	6	3	7
(Slovakia) L Klein	4	6	5
Q	(United States) A Ritschard	5	7	6
(Croatia) B Gojo	7	5	3

Quarterfinals
7	(Czech Republic) T Macháč	7^{10}	6
PR	(Austria) G Melzer	6^{8}	4
5	(Netherlands) B van de Zandschulp	6	6
Q	(United States) A Ritschard	2	3

Semifinals
7	(Czech Republic) T Macháč	6	6
5	(Netherlands) B van de Zandschulp	2	2
