= 2018 Svijany Open – Singles =

Singles
- 2018 Svijany Open

Final
- Champion: (Slovakia) Andrej Martin
- Runner-up: (Portugal) Pedro Sousa
- Score: 6–1, 6–2

Events
Singles	Doubles
- Svijany Open

Pedro Sousa was the defending champion but lost in the final to Andrej Martin.

Martin won the title after defeating Sousa 6–1, 6–2 in the final.

== Seeds ==
1. (Portugal) Pedro Sousa (final)
2. (Slovakia) Andrej Martin (champion)
3. (Hungary) Attila Balázs (first round)
4. (Czech Republic) Adam Pavlásek (first round)
5. (Brazil) Guilherme Clezar (first round)
6. (Spain) Pedro Martínez (quarterfinals)
7. (Croatia) Nino Serdarušić (first round)
8. (Belarus) Uladzimir Ignatik (second round)

== Draw ==
Key

- Q = Qualifier
- WC = Wild card
- LL = Lucky loser
- Alt = Alternate
- ITF = ITF entry
- PR = Protected ranking
- SR = Special ranking
- SE = Special exempt
- JE = Junior exempt
- JR = Junior Accelerator Programme entrant
- CO = College Accelerator Programme entrant
- NG = Next Gen Accelerator Program entrant
- w/o = Walkover
- r = Retired
- d = Defaulted

=== Finals ===
Semifinals
1	(Portugal) Pedro Sousa	6	6
(Portugal) Gonçalo Oliveira	1	1
Q	(Russia) Pavel Kotov	0	3
2	(Slovakia) Andrej Martin	6	6

Final
1	(Portugal) Pedro Sousa	1	2
2	(Slovakia) Andrej Martin	6	6

=== Top half ===
First round
1	(Portugal) P Sousa	6	6
(France) C Lestienne	2	4
Q	(Hungary) Z Piros	7	6
(Germany) T Kamke	5	3
(France) J Tatlot	6	6
(Canada) S Diez	3	2
WC	(Czech Republic) J Šátral	6	6
7	(Croatia) N Serdarušić	3	2
3	(Hungary) A Balázs	4	2
(Czech Republic) V Šafránek	6	6
(Portugal) J Domingues	7^{7}	6
(Germany) R Molleker	6^{1}	0
SE	(Peru) JP Varillas	6	7
(France) J Blancaneaux	2	5
(Portugal) G Oliveira	7^{10}	6
5	(Brazil) G Clezar	6^{8}	2

Second round
1	(Portugal) P Sousa	6	3	7^{7}
Q	(Hungary) Z Piros	1	6	6^{5}
(France) J Tatlot	6	5	6
WC	(Czech Republic) J Šátral	3	7	0
(Czech Republic) V Šafránek	4	0
(Portugal) J Domingues	6	6
SE	(Peru) JP Varillas	1	4
(Portugal) G Oliveira	6	6

Quarterfinals
1	(Portugal) P Sousa	6	6
(France) J Tatlot	3	1
(Portugal) J Domingues	4	3
(Portugal) G Oliveira	6	6

Semifinals
1	(Portugal) P Sousa	6	6
(Portugal) G Oliveira	1	1

=== Bottom half ===
First round
6	(Spain) P Martínez	6	4	6
Q	(Slovenia) N Razboršek	3	6	3
WC	(Czech Republic) D Kellovský	1	5
PR	(Italy) R Bellotti	6	7
(France) B Bonzi	2	6	6
WC	(Czech Republic) P Rikl	6	2	1
Q	(Russia) P Kotov	6^{6}	6	6
4	(Czech Republic) A Pavlásek	7^{8}	2	4
8	(Belarus) U Ignatik	6	6^{5}	6
(Italy) A Basso	2	7^{7}	3
Q	(Czech Republic) D Poljak	6	1	3
WC	(Czech Republic) M Vrbenský	2	6	6
(Spain) B Zapata Miralles	2	1
(Spain) D Muñoz de la Nava	6	6
(Czech Republic) L Rosol	2	0^{r}
2	(Slovakia) A Martin	6	1

Second round
6	(Spain) P Martínez	6	3	6
PR	(Italy) R Bellotti	4	6	3
(France) B Bonzi	3	1
Q	(Russia) P Kotov	6	6
8	(Belarus) U Ignatik	6	5	4
WC	(Czech Republic) M Vrbenský	4	7	6
(Spain) D Muñoz de la Nava	2	2
2	(Slovakia) A Martin	6	6

Quarterfinals
6	(Spain) P Martínez	3	4
Q	(Russia) P Kotov	6	6
WC	(Czech Republic) M Vrbenský	3	1
2	(Slovakia) A Martin	6	6

Semifinals
Q	(Russia) P Kotov	0	3
2	(Slovakia) A Martin	6	6
