= 2016 Svijany Open =

- Date: 1 – 7 August
- Edition: 4th
- Location: Liberec, Czech Republic

Champions

Singles
- (Belgium) Arthur De Greef

Doubles
- (France) Jonathan Eysseric / (Brazil) André Ghem
- Svijany Open

The 2016 Svijany Open was a professional tennis tournament played on clay courts. It was the 4th edition of the tournament which was part of the 2016 ATP Challenger Tour. It took place in Liberec, Czech Republic between 1 and 7 August 2016.

== Singles main-draw entrants ==
=== Seeds ===
Country	Player	Rank^{1}	Seed
CZE	Adam Pavlásek	113	1
BEL	Steve Darcis	133	2
ARG	Nicolás Kicker	135	3
COL	Santiago Giraldo	150	4
BEL	Kimmer Coppejans	155	5
SUI	Henri Laaksonen	162	6
BEL	Arthur De Greef	171	7
FRA	Constant Lestienne	175	8

- ^{1} Rankings are as of 28 July 2016.

=== Other entrants ===
The following players received wildcards into the singles main draw:

- (Czech Republic) Dominik Kellovský
- (Czech Republic) Václav Šafránek
- (Austria) Jürgen Melzer
- (Belgium) Steve Darcis

The following player entered the singles main draw as a special exempt:

- (Czech Republic) Zdeněk Kolář

The following player received entered as an alternate:

- (Serbia) Miljan Zekić

The following players received entry from the qualifying draw:

- (Sweden) Markus Eriksson
- (Slovakia) Norbert Gombos
- (Belgium) Germain Gigounon
- (Poland) Kamil Majchrzak

The following player received entry as a lucky loser:

- (Sweden) Carl Söderlund

== Champions ==
=== Singles ===
- (Belgium) Arthur De Greef def. (Belgium) Steve Darcis, 7–6^{(7–4)}, 6–3

=== Doubles ===
- (France) Jonathan Eysseric / (Brazil) André Ghem def. (Uruguay) Ariel Behar / (Croatia) Dino Marcan, 6–0, 6–4
