= 2018 Svijany Open =

- Date: 30 July – 5 August
- Edition: 6th
- Location: Liberec, Czech Republic

Champions

Singles
- (Slovakia) Andrej Martin

Doubles
- (Belgium) Sander Gillé / (Belgium) Joran Vliegen
- Svijany Open

The 2018 Svijany Open was a professional tennis tournament played on clay courts. It was the 6th edition of the tournament which was part of the 2018 ATP Challenger Tour. It took place in Liberec, Czech Republic between 30 July and 5 August 2018.

== Singles main-draw entrants ==
=== Seeds ===
Country	Player	Rank^{1}	Seed
POR	Pedro Sousa	140	1
SVK	Andrej Martin	163	2
HUN	Attila Balázs	167	3
CZE	Adam Pavlásek	181	4
BRA	Guilherme Clezar	192	5
ESP	Pedro Martínez	193	6
CRO	Nino Serdarušić	194	7
BLR	Uladzimir Ignatik	212	8

- ^{1} Rankings are as of 23 July 2018.

=== Other entrants ===
The following players received wildcards into the singles main draw:

- (Czech Republic) Dominik Kellovský
- (Czech Republic) Patrik Rikl
- (Czech Republic) Jan Šátral
- (Czech Republic) Michael Vrbenský

The following player received entry into the singles main draw as a special exempt:

- (Peru) Juan Pablo Varillas

The following player received entry into the singles main draw using a protected ranking:

- (Italy) Riccardo Bellotti

The following players received entry from the qualifying draw:

- (Russia) Pavel Kotov
- (Hungary) Zsombor Piros
- (Czech Republic) David Poljak
- (Slovenia) Nik Razboršek

== Champions ==
=== Singles ===
- (Slovakia) Andrej Martin def. (Portugal) Pedro Sousa 6–1, 6–2.

=== Doubles ===
- (Belgium) Sander Gillé / (Belgium) Joran Vliegen def. (Slovakia) Filip Polášek / (Czech Republic) Patrik Rikl 6–3, 6–4.
