= 2015 Svijany Open =

- Date: 3 – 9 August
- Edition: 3rd
- Location: Liberec, Czech Republic

Champions

Singles
- (Germany) Tobias Kamke

Doubles
- (Slovakia) Andrej Martin / (Chile) Hans Podlipnik
- Svijany Open

The 2015 Svijany Open was a professional tennis tournament played on clay courts. It was the 3rd edition of the tournament which was part of the 2015 ATP Challenger Tour. It took place in Liberec, Czech Republic between 3 and 9 August 2015.

== Singles main-draw entrants ==
=== Seeds ===
Country	Player	Rank^{1}	Seed
BEL	Steve Darcis	64	1
KAZ	Aleksandr Nedovyesov	92	2
MDA	Radu Albot	100	3
BEL	Kimmer Coppejans	104	4
ESP	Íñigo Cervantes	124	5
ARG	Horacio Zeballos	146	6
CZE	Adam Pavlásek	154	7
CHI	Hans Podlipnik	167	8

- ^{1} Rankings are as of 27 July 2015.

=== Other entrants ===
The following players received wildcards into the singles main draw:

- (Czech Republic) Roman Jebavý
- (Czech Republic) Václav Šafránek
- (Czech Republic) Robin Staněk

The following player entered using a protected ranking:

- (Spain) José Checa Calvo

The following players received entry from the qualifying draw:

- (Italy) Flavio Cipolla
- (Croatia) Mate Delić
- (Argentina) Juan Ignacio Londero
- (Mexico) César Ramírez

== Champions ==
=== Singles ===
- (Germany) Tobias Kamke def. (Slovakia) Andrej Martin 7–6^{(7–4)}, 6–4

=== Doubles ===
- (Slovakia) Andrej Martin / (Chile) Hans Podlipnik def. (Netherlands) Wesley Koolhof / (Netherlands) Matwé Middelkoop 7–5, 6–7^{(3–7)}, [10–5]
