= 2017 Svijany Open =

- Date: 31 July – 6 August
- Edition: 5th
- Location: Liberec, Czech Republic

Champions

Singles
- (Portugal) Pedro Sousa

Doubles
- (Lithuania) Laurynas Grigelis / (Czech Republic) Zdeněk Kolář
- Svijany Open

The 2017 Svijany Open was a professional tennis tournament played on clay courts. It was the 5th edition of the tournament which was part of the 2017 ATP Challenger Tour. It took place in Liberec, Czech Republic between 31 July and 6 August 2017.

== Singles main-draw entrants ==
=== Seeds ===
Country	Player	Rank^{1}	Seed
CZE	Adam Pavlásek	127	1
GER	Oscar Otte	152	2
GER	Cedrik-Marcel Stebe	153	3
POR	Pedro Sousa	156	4
GER	Tobias Kamke	165	5
CZE	Lukáš Rosol	168	6
ESP	Tommy Robredo	180	7
RUS	Alexey Vatutin	183	8

- ^{1} Rankings are as of 24 July 2017.

=== Other entrants ===
The following players received wildcards into the singles main draw:

- (Czech Republic) Marek Jaloviec
- (Czech Republic) Dominik Kellovský
- (Czech Republic) Patrik Rikl
- (Spain) Tommy Robredo

The following players received entry from the qualifying draw:

- (Bolivia) Hugo Dellien
- (Argentina) Juan Pablo Ficovich
- (Russia) Roman Safiullin
- (Czech Republic) Robin Staněk

== Champions ==
=== Singles ===
- (Portugal) Pedro Sousa def. (Brazil) Guilherme Clezar 6–4, 5–7, 6–2.

=== Doubles ===
- (Lithuania) Laurynas Grigelis / (Czech Republic) Zdeněk Kolář def. (Poland) Tomasz Bednarek / (Netherlands) David Pel 6–3, 6–4.
