= 2019 Svijany Open =

- Date: 29 July – 4 August
- Edition: 7th
- Location: Liberec, Czech Republic

Champions

Singles
- (Serbia) Nikola Milojević

Doubles
- (Czech Republic) Jonáš Forejtek / (Czech Republic) Michael Vrbenský
- Svijany Open

The 2019 Svijany Open was a professional tennis tournament played on clay courts. It was the 7th edition of the tournament which was part of the 2019 ATP Challenger Tour. It took place in Liberec, Czech Republic between 29 July and 4 August 2019.

== Singles main-draw entrants ==
=== Seeds ===
| Country | Player | Rank^{1} | Seed |
|---|---|---|---|
| SVK | Andrej Martin | 118 | 1 |
| HUN | Attila Balázs | 141 | 2 |
| CZE | Jiří Veselý | 142 | 3 |
| ITA | Filippo Baldi | 149 | 4 |
| GBR | Jay Clarke | 153 | 5 |
| ITA | Federico Gaio | 160 | 6 |
| POR | João Domingues | 170 | 7 |
| ARG | Federico Coria | 172 | 8 |
| ~~ARG~~ | ~~Facundo Argüello~~ | ~~176~~ | ~~9~~ |
| ITA | Roberto Marcora | 183 | 10 |
| SRB | Nikola Milojević | 188 | 11 |
| KAZ | Aleksandr Nedovyesov | 202 | 12 |
| ARG | Marco Trungelliti | 206 | 13 |
| GER | Tobias Kamke | 225 | 14 |
| BRA | Rogério Dutra Silva | 227 | 15 |
| ESP | Daniel Gimeno Traver | 248 | 16 |

- ^{1} Rankings are as of 22 July 2019.

=== Other entrants ===
The following players received wildcards into the singles main draw:

- (Czech Republic) Jonáš Forejtek
- (Czech Republic) Jiří Lehečka
- (Czech Republic) Tomáš Macháč
- (Czech Republic) Petr Nouza
- (Czech Republic) David Poljak

The following player received entry into the singles main draw as a special exempt:

- (Spain) Mario Vilella Martínez

The following players received entry into the singles main draw as alternates:

- (France) Fabien Reboul
- (Czech Republic) Michael Vrbenský

The following players received entry into the singles main draw using their ITF World Tennis Ranking:

- (France) Corentin Denolly
- (France) Sadio Doumbia
- (Germany) Peter Heller
- (Czech Republic) Vít Kopřiva
- (Egypt) Karim-Mohamed Maamoun

The following players received entry from the qualifying draw:

- (Czech Republic) Pavel Nejedlý
- (Czech Republic) Jaroslav Pospíšil

The following player received entry as a lucky loser:

- (Czech Republic) Lubomír Majšajdr

== Champions ==
=== Singles ===
- (Serbia) Nikola Milojević def. (Brazil) Rogério Dutra Silva 6–3, 3–6, 6–4.

=== Doubles ===
- (Czech Republic) Jonáš Forejtek / (Czech Republic) Michael Vrbenský def. (Serbia) Nikola Čačić / (Croatia) Antonio Šančić 6–4, 6–3.
