= 2023 Svijany Open – Singles =

Singles
- 2023 Svijany Open

Final
- Champion: (Argentina) Francisco Comesaña
- Runner-up: (United States) Toby Kodat
- Score: 6–2, 6–4

Events
| Singles | Doubles |
- Svijany Open

Jiří Lehečka was the defending champion but chose not to defend his title.

Francisco Comesaña won the title after defeating Toby Kodat 6–2, 6–4 in the final.

== Seeds ==
1. (Czech Republic) Tomáš Macháč (second round, retired)
2. (Slovakia) Lukáš Klein (second round)
3. (Czech Republic) Dalibor Svrčina (quarterfinals)
4. (India) Sumit Nagal (second round)
5. (Italy) Riccardo Bonadio (second round)
6. (Slovakia) Norbert Gombos (second round)
7. (Czech Republic) Jakub Menšík (first round, retired)
8. (Argentina) Francisco Comesaña (champion)

== Draw ==
Key

- Q = Qualifier
- WC = Wild card
- LL = Lucky loser
- Alt = Alternate
- ITF = ITF entry
- PR = Protected ranking
- SR = Special ranking
- SE = Special exempt
- JE = Junior exempt
- JR = Junior Accelerator Programme entrant
- CO = College Accelerator Programme entrant
- NG = Next Gen Accelerator Program entrant
- w/o = Walkover
- r = Retired
- d = Defaulted

=== Finals ===
Semifinals
(South Korea) Gerard Campaña Lee | 1 | 5
Q | (United States) Toby Kodat | 6 | 7
(France) Ugo Blanchet | 3 | 0
8 | (Argentina) Francisco Comesaña | 6 | 6

Final
Q | (United States) Toby Kodat | 2 | 4
8 | (Argentina) Francisco Comesaña | 6 | 6

=== Top half ===
First round
1 | (Czech Republic) T Macháč | 7 | 6
Q | (Spain) Àlex Martí Pujolràs | 5 | 1
(Croatia) N Serdarušić | 4 | 6 | 4
(South Korea) G Campaña Lee | 6 | 3 | 6
(Argentina) H Casanova | 6 | 6
(Serbia) M Zekić | 3 | 4
(Brazil) M Pucinelli de Almeida | 2 | 1
5 | (Italy) R Bonadio | 6 | 6
4 | (India) S Nagal | 6 | 7^{7}
WC | (Czech Republic) A Paulson | 0 | 6^{5}
WC | (Czech Republic) J Veselý | 6 | 3 | 4
Q | (Argentina) FA Gómez | 4 | 6 | 6
Q | (United States) T Kodat | 3 | 6 | 6
(Germany) Timo Stodder | 6 | 3 | 3
(Italy) G Fonio | 6^{5} | 4
6 | (Slovakia) N Gombos | 7^{7} | 6

Second round
1 | (Czech Republic) T Macháč | 5 | 0^{r}
(South Korea) G Campaña Lee | 7 | 0
(Argentina) H Casanova | 6 | 7^{7}
5 | (Italy) R Bonadio | 4 | 6^{5}
4 | (India) S Nagal | 4 | 2
Q | (Argentina) FA Gómez | 6 | 6
Q | (United States) T Kodat | 6 | 6
6 | (Slovakia) N Gombos | 4 | 3

Quarterfinals
(South Korea) G Campaña Lee | 6 | 6^{5} | 6
(Argentina) H Casanova | 3 | 7^{7} | 4
Q | (Argentina) FA Gómez | 1 | 0
Q | (United States) T Kodat | 6 | 6

Semifinals
(South Korea) G Campaña Lee | 1 | 5
Q | (United States) T Kodat | 6 | 7

=== Bottom half ===
First round
7 | (Czech Republic) J Menšík | 3 | 0^{r}
(Czech Republic) V Kopřiva | 6 | 1
(France) U Blanchet | 6 | 6
WC | (Czech Republic) H Bartoň | 1 | 3
(Netherlands) M Houkes | 5 | 4
(Poland) D Michalski | 7 | 6
(Poland) M Kaśnikowski | 6 | 6^{0} | 3
3 | (Czech Republic) D Svrčina | 3 | 7^{7} | 6
8 | (Argentina) F Comesaña | 6 | 6
Q | (France) C Bittoun Kouzmine | 1 | 3
Q | (Czech Republic) M Vrbenský | 6 | 2 | 6
(France) V Royer | 4 | 6 | 4
Q | Kirill Kivattsev | 5 | 4
(Croatia) D Prižmić | 7 | 6
(Brazil) JL Reis da Silva | 1 | 2
2 | (Slovakia) L Klein | 6 | 6

Second round
(Czech Republic) V Kopřiva | 6 | 4 | 2
(France) U Blanchet | 3 | 6 | 6
(Poland) D Michalski | 5 | 6 | 3
3 | (Czech Republic) D Svrčina | 7 | 4 | 6
8 | (Argentina) F Comesaña | 7 | 6
Q | (Czech Republic) M Vrbenský | 5 | 4
(Croatia) D Prižmić | 6 | 7^{8}
2 | (Slovakia) L Klein | 2 | 6^{6}

Quarterfinals
(France) U Blanchet | 6 | 6
3 | (Czech Republic) D Svrčina | 0 | 3
8 | (Argentina) F Comesaña | 3 | 7 | 6
(Croatia) D Prižmić | 6 | 5 | 2

Semifinals
(France) U Blanchet | 3 | 0
8 | (Argentina) F Comesaña | 6 | 6
