= 2014 Svijany Open – Singles =

Singles
- 2014 Svijany Open

Final
- Champion: (Slovakia) Andrej Martin
- Runner-up: (Argentina) Horacio Zeballos
- Score: 1–6, 6–1, 6–4

Events
Singles	Doubles
- Svijany Open

Andrej Martin took the title, beating Horacio Zeballos 1–6, 6–1, 6–4

== Seeds ==
1. (Uruguay) Pablo Cuevas (second round)
2. (Slovenia) Blaž Rola (semifinals)
3. (Argentina) Facundo Bagnis (first round)
4. (Argentina) Horacio Zeballos (final)
5. (Argentina) Facundo Argüello (first round)
6. (Slovakia) Norbert Gomboš (quarterfinals)
7. (Poland) Michał Przysiężny (first round)
8. (Slovakia) Miloslav Mečíř (first round)

== Draw ==
Key

- Q = Qualifier
- WC = Wild card
- LL = Lucky loser
- Alt = Alternate
- ITF = ITF entry
- PR = Protected ranking
- SR = Special ranking
- SE = Special exempt
- JE = Junior exempt
- JR = Junior Accelerator Programme entrant
- CO = College Accelerator Programme entrant
- NG = Next Gen Accelerator Program entrant
- w/o = Walkover
- r = Retired
- d = Defaulted

=== Finals ===
Semifinals
(Chinese Taipei) Yang Tsung-hua	5	4
4	(Argentina) Horacio Zeballos	7	6
(Slovakia) Andrej Martin	6	6
2	(Slovenia) Blaž Rola	4	4

Final
4	(Argentina) Horacio Zeballos	6	1	4
(Slovakia) Andrej Martin	1	6	6

=== Top half ===
First round
1	(Uruguay) P Cuevas	3	6	6
Q	(Czech Republic) M Michalička	6	2	3
(Chinese Taipei) T-h Yang	7	6
(Czech Republic) J Pospíšil	5	4
(Spain) J Samper Montaña	6	5	6
Q	(Ukraine) A Smirnov	4	7	4
Q	(Brazil) T Monteiro	1	5
6	(Slovakia) N Gomboš	6	7
4	(Argentina) H Zeballos	4	6	6
Q	(France) G Mina	6	3	2
(Netherlands) B Westerhof	6	6^{1}	2
WC	(Czech Republic) Robin Stanek	3	7^{7}	6
(Belarus) U Ignatik	6	6
WC	(Czech Republic) V Šafránek	1	2
WC	(Czech Republic) R Jebavý	6	7
5	(Argentina) F Argüello	1	5

Second round
1	(Uruguay) P Cuevas	5	1
(Chinese Taipei) T-h Yang	7	6
(Spain) J Samper Montaña	6^{2}	5
6	(Slovakia) N Gomboš	7^{7}	7
4	(Argentina) H Zeballos	6	6
WC	(Czech Republic) R Stanek	4	4
(Belarus) U Ignatik	6	6
WC	(Czech Republic) R Jebavý	3	3

Quarterfinals
(Chinese Taipei) T-h Yang	6	6
6	(Slovakia) N Gomboš	1	4
4	(Argentina) H Zeballos	6^{3}	7^{9}	6
(Belarus) U Ignatik	7^{7}	6^{7}	3

Semifinals
(Chinese Taipei) T-h Yang	5	4
4	(Argentina) H Zeballos	7	6

=== Bottom half ===
First round
8	(Slovakia) M Mečíř	3	2
(Czech Republic) J Hájek	6	6
(France) J Eysseric	4	2
(Slovakia) A Martin	6	6
(Czech Republic) J Mertl	1	5
(Czech Republic) A Pavlásek	6	7
WC	(Belgium) S Darcis	6	6
3	(Argentina) F Bagnis	3	1
7	(Poland) M Przysiężny	6^{6}	3
(Egypt) M Safwat	7^{8}	6
(Spain) R Carballés Baena	3	6	6
(Sweden) E Ymer	6	4	1
(Belgium) G Gigounon	4	6	5
(Czech Republic) J Hernych	6	3	7
(Germany) T Pütz	4	1
2	(Slovenia) B Rola	6	6

Second round
(Czech Republic) J Hájek	4	6^{7}
(Slovakia) A Martin	6	7^{9}
(Czech Republic) A Pavlásek	3	4
WC	(Belgium) S Darcis	6	6
(Egypt) M Safwat	0	2
(Spain) R Carballés Baena	6	6
(Czech Republic) J Hernych	3	5
2	(Slovenia) B Rola	6	7

Quarterfinals
(Slovakia) A Martin	1	7	6
WC	(Belgium) S Darcis	6	5	4
(Spain) R Carballés Baena	6^{3}	6	2
2	(Slovenia) B Rola	7^{7}	0	6

Semifinals
(Slovakia) A Martin	6	6
2	(Slovenia) B Rola	4	4
