= 2014 Svijany Open =

- Date: 28 July – 3 August
- Edition: 2nd
- Location: Liberec, Czech Republic

Champions

Singles
- (Slovakia) Andrej Martin

Doubles
- (Czech Republic) Roman Jebavý / (Czech Republic) Jaroslav Pospíšil
- Svijany Open

The 2014 Svijany Open was a professional tennis tournament played on clay courts. It was the 2nd edition of the tournament which was part of the 2014 ATP Challenger Tour. It took place in Liberec, Czech Republic between 28 July and 3 August 2014.

== ATP entrants ==
=== Seeds ===
Country	Player	Rank^{1}	Seed
URU	Pablo Cuevas	60	1
SLO	Blaž Rola	80	2
ARG	Facundo Bagnis	107	3
ARG	Horacio Zeballos	117	4
ARG	Facundo Argüello	121	5
SVK	Norbert Gomboš	131	6
POL	Michał Przysiężny	146	7
SVK	Miloslav Mečíř	175	8

- ^{1} Rankings are as of July 21, 2014.

=== Other entrants ===
The following players received wildcards into the singles main draw:

- (Belgium) Steve Darcis
- (Czech Republic) Roman Jebavý
- (Czech Republic) Václav Šafránek
- (Czech Republic) Robin Stanek

The following players received entry from the qualifying draw:

- (Czech Republic) Marek Michalička
- (France) Gianni Mina
- (Brazil) Thiago Monteiro
- (Ukraine) Artem Smirnov

== Champions ==
=== Singles ===
- (Slovakia) Andrej Martin def. (Argentina) Horacio Zeballos 1–6, 6–1, 6–4

=== Doubles ===
- (Czech Republic) Roman Jebavý / (Czech Republic) Jaroslav Pospíšil def. (Philippines) Ruben Gonzales / (United Kingdom) Sean Thornley 6–4, 6–3
