= 2018 Svijany Open – Doubles =

Doubles
- 2018 Svijany Open

Final
- Champions: (Belgium) Sander Gillé (Belgium) Joran Vliegen
- Runners-up: (Slovakia) Filip Polášek (Czech Republic) Patrik Rikl
- Score: 6–3, 6–4

Events
Singles	Doubles
- Svijany Open

Laurynas Grigelis and Zdeněk Kolář were the defending champions but chose not to defend their title.

Sander Gillé and Joran Vliegen won the title after defeating Filip Polášek and Patrik Rikl 6–3, 6–4 in the final.

== Seeds ==
1. (Belgium) Sander Gillé / (Belgium) Joran Vliegen (champions)
2. (Spain) Pedro Martínez / (Spain) David Vega Hernández (semifinals)
3. (Venezuela) Luis David Martínez / (Portugal) Gonçalo Oliveira (first round)
4. (Italy) Walter Trusendi / (Italy) Andrea Vavassori (first round)

== Draw ==
Key

- Q = Qualifier
- WC = Wild card
- LL = Lucky loser
- Alt = Alternate
- ITF = ITF entry
- PR = Protected ranking
- SR = Special ranking
- SE = Special exempt
- JE = Junior exempt
- JR = Junior Accelerator Programme entrant
- CO = College Accelerator Programme entrant
- NG = Next Gen Accelerator Program entrant
- w/o = Walkover
- r = Retired
- d = Defaulted

First round
1	(Belgium) S Gillé (Belgium) J Vliegen	3	6	[10]
(Czech Republic) V Kopřiva (Czech Republic) A Pavlásek	6	2	[5]
(Argentina) JP Ficovich (Peru) JP Varillas	7	6^{2}	[10]
(Croatia) T Draganja (Croatia) N Serdarušić	5	7^{7}	[7]
3	(Venezuela) LD Martínez (Portugal) G Oliveira	4	6	[4]
(Czech Republic) V Šafránek (Czech Republic) J Šátral	6	1	[10]
(Sweden) M Eriksson (Sweden) A Göransson	6	6
WC	(Czech Republic) M Gengel (Czech Republic) D Kellovský	2	1
(Brazil) G Clezar (Portugal) J Domingues	4	2
(France) B Bonzi (Netherlands) M Vervoort	6	6
WC	(Slovakia) F Polášek (Czech Republic) P Rikl	6	4	[10]
4	(Italy) W Trusendi (Italy) A Vavassori	4	6	[8]
WC	(Czech Republic) Lubomír Majšajdr (Czech Republic) Martin Zahrádka	6	3	[11]
(France) G Blancaneaux (France) J Tatlot	4	6	[9]
PR	(United States) A Reed (Spain) B Zapata Miralles	5	3
2	(Spain) P Martínez (Spain) D Vega Hernández	7	6

Quarterfinals
1	(Belgium) S Gillé (Belgium) J Vliegen	6	6
(Argentina) JP Ficovich (Peru) JP Varillas	2	0
(Czech Republic) V Šafránek (Czech Republic) J Šátral	4	3
(Sweden) M Eriksson (Sweden) A Göransson	6	6
(France) B Bonzi (Netherlands) M Vervoort	2	0
WC	(Slovakia) F Polášek (Czech Republic) P Rikl	6	6
WC	(Czech Republic) L Majšajdr (Czech Republic) M Zahrádka	5	3
2	(Spain) P Martínez (Spain) D Vega Hernández	7	6

Semifinals
1	(Belgium) S Gillé (Belgium) J Vliegen	3	6	[10]
(Sweden) M Eriksson (Sweden) A Göransson	6	3	[8]
WC	(Slovakia) F Polášek (Czech Republic) P Rikl	6	6^{7}	[10]
2	(Spain) P Martínez (Spain) D Vega Hernández	4	7^{9}	[8]

Final
1	(Belgium) S Gillé (Belgium) J Vliegen	6	6
WC	(Slovakia) F Polášek (Czech Republic) P Rikl	3	4
