= 2016 Svijany Open – Singles =

Singles
- 2016 Svijany Open

Final
- Champion: (Belgium) Arthur De Greef
- Runner-up: (Belgium) Steve Darcis
- Score: 7–6^{(7–4)}, 6–3

Events
Singles	Doubles
- Svijany Open

Tobias Kamke was the defending champion but chose not to participate.

Arthur De Greef won the title after defeating Steve Darcis 7–6^{(7–4)}, 6–3 in the final.

== Seeds ==
1. (Czech Republic) Adam Pavlásek (first round, retired)
2. (Belgium) Steve Darcis (final)
3. (Argentina) Nicolás Kicker (second round)
4. (Colombia) Santiago Giraldo (second round)
5. (Belgium) Kimmer Coppejans (second round)
6. (Switzerland) Henri Laaksonen (second round)
7. (Belgium) Arthur De Greef (champion)
8. (France) Constant Lestienne (first round)

== Draw ==
Key

- Q = Qualifier
- WC = Wild card
- LL = Lucky loser
- Alt = Alternate
- ITF = ITF entry
- PR = Protected ranking
- SR = Special ranking
- SE = Special exempt
- JE = Junior exempt
- JR = Junior Accelerator Programme entrant
- CO = College Accelerator Programme entrant
- NG = Next Gen Accelerator Program entrant
- w/o = Walkover
- r = Retired
- d = Defaulted

=== Finals ===
Semifinals
(Belgium) Joris De Loore	4	4
7	(Belgium) Arthur De Greef	6	6
WC	(Czech Republic) Václav Šafránek	6^{4}	0
2/WC	(Belgium) Steve Darcis	7^{7}	6

Final
7	(Belgium) Arthur De Greef	7^{7}	6
2/WC	(Belgium) Steve Darcis	6^{4}	3

=== Top half ===
First round
1	(Czech Republic) A Pavlásek	6	4	0^{r}
(Romania) A Ungur	4	6	3
(Italy) R Bellotti	7	6^{5}	6
(Czech Republic) Robin Staněk	5	7^{7}	4
(Austria) D Novak	6	4	0
(Kazakhstan) D Popko	1	6	6
(Belgium) J De Loore	4	6	7^{7}
8	(France) C Lestienne	6	4	6^{2}
3	(Argentina) N Kicker	6	6
Q	(Sweden) M Eriksson	2	4
(Brazil) A Ghem	5	7^{7}	6^{4}
(Portugal) P Sousa	7	6^{2}	7^{7}
Alt	(Serbia) M Zekić	3	3
(Russia) A Vatutin	6	6
WC	(Czech Republic) D Kellovský	6^{6}	6	2
7	(Belgium) A De Greef	7^{8}	4	6

Second round
(Romania) A Ungur	6	5	3
(Italy) R Bellotti	2	7	6
(Kazakhstan) D Popko	3	2
(Belgium) J De Loore	6	6
3	(Argentina) N Kicker	4	4
(Portugal) P Sousa	6	6
(Russia) A Vatutin	2	4
7	(Belgium) A De Greef	6	6

Quarterfinals
(Italy) R Bellotti	1	6^{1}
(Belgium) J De Loore	6	7^{7}
(Portugal) P Sousa
7	(Belgium) A De Greef	w/o

Semifinals
(Belgium) J De Loore	4	4
7	(Belgium) A De Greef	6	6

=== Bottom half ===
First round
5	(Belgium) K Coppejans	2	6	7
SE	(Czech Republic) Z Kolář	6	3	5
WC	(Czech Republic) V Šafránek	4	6	6
(Serbia) M Janković	6	2	3
(Spain) J Samper-Montaña	3	2
Q	(Belgium) G Gigounon	6	6
(France) A Michon	2	4
4	(Colombia) S Giraldo	6	6
6	(Switzerland) H Laaksonen	6	6
Q	(Poland) K Majchrzak	4	4
(France) M Bourgue	4	6	7^{8}
LL	(Sweden) C Söderlund	6	2	6^{6}
WC	(Austria) J Melzer	3	6	6
(Turkey) M İlhan	6	3	2
Q	(Slovakia) N Gombos	3	6	3
2/WC	(Belgium) S Darcis	6	3	6

Second round
5	(Belgium) K Coppejans	3	6	3
WC	(Czech Republic) V Šafránek	6	2	6
Q	(Belgium) G Gigounon	6	6
4	(Colombia) S Giraldo	4	3
6	(Switzerland) H Laaksonen	3	6	3
(France) M Bourgue	6	3	6
WC	(Austria) J Melzer	3	2
2/WC	(Belgium) S Darcis	6	6

Quarterfinals
WC	(Czech Republic) V Šafránek	5	6	6
Q	(Belgium) G Gigounon	7	4	4
(France) M Bourgue	6^{5}	6^{3}
2/WC	(Belgium) S Darcis	7^{7}	7^{7}

Semifinals
WC	(Czech Republic) V Šafránek	6^{4}	0
2/WC	(Belgium) S Darcis	7^{7}	6
