= Toby Kodat =

American tennis player

- Full name: Toby Alex Kodat
- Country (sports): United States
- Residence: United States
- Born: 13 January 2003 (age 23) Bradenton, Florida, United States
- Height: 1.78 m (5 ft 10 in)
- Turned pro: 2020
- Plays: Right-handed (one-handed backhand)
- Prize money: $133,865

Singles
- Career record: 0–0
- Career titles: 0
- Highest ranking: No. 308 (24 June 2024)
- Current ranking: No. 559 (20 October 2025)

Grand Slam singles results
- Australian Open Junior: 3R (2019)
- French Open Junior: F (2019)
- Wimbledon Junior: 1R (2019)
- US Open Junior: 2R (2019)

Doubles
- Career record: 1–1
- Career titles: 0
- Highest ranking: No. 366 (12 October 2020)

Grand Slam doubles results
- US Open: 2R (2019)
- Last updated on: 20 October 2025.

Toby Alex Kodat (born 13 January 2003) is an American professional tennis player. Kodat and fellow American Martin Damm were the youngest men's doubles team to win a US Open match in the Open Era. He has a career high ATP singles ranking of world No. 308 achieved on 24 June 2024.

== Personal life ==
Kodat is the half-brother of former tennis player Nicole Vaidišová. His brother-in-law is Radek Štěpánek.

== Career ==
=== 2019: Grand Slam doubles debut and win, Junior Major Final ===
In the junior tour, Kodat reached the finals of the 2019 French Open where he ultimately lost in the final to Holger Rune.

In August 2019, Kodat and his partner Martin Damm won the USTA Boys 18s National Championships doubles title, earning the pair a wildcard entry into the doubles main draw of the 2019 US Open. Kodat and fellow American Damm became the youngest men's doubles team to win a US Open match in the Open Era.

=== 2020: First ITF final ===
Kodat lost his first ITF final at an M15 event in Cairo to Juan Bautista Torres.

=== 2021: First ITF title, ATP debut, Challenger debut ===
Kodat achieved a career high junior ranking of world No. 4 on January 11, 2021.

Kodat began the year by capturing his first M15 ITF title in Antalya defeating Maxime Hamou.

At the 2021 Miami Open, Kodat received a wildcard into the qualifying draw but lost to Thiago Seyboth Wild in straight sets. In August, Kodat received a wildcard into the main draw of the Prague Challenger 50 but lost in straight sets in the first round.

=== 2023: Top 400 and First Challenger Final ===
In February 2023, Kodat qualified for the ATP Challenger 75 in Rome, Georgia. He defeated Enzo Couacaud 6-4, 6-3 in the first round of main draw. In the second round, Kodat defeated Sho Shimabukuro to reach the quarterfinals. In the quarterfinals he lost in 3 sets to Seong Chan Hong.

In April, Kodat gained a wildcard into the ATP Sarasota Challenger 125 and in the first round defeated Rio Noguchi 6-3, 1-6, 7-5 to advance to the round of 16.

In July, Kodat qualified for the ATP Challenger 75 in Liberec, Czech Republic. He defeated Timo Stodder 3-6, 6-3, 6-3 in the first round of main draw. In the second round, Kodat defeated in straight sets former top 100 player and the 6 seed Norbert Gombos 6-4, 6-3. In the quarterfinals, Kodat defeated Federico Agustín Gómez 6-1, 6-0 to reach his first ever challenger semifinal. In the semifinal, Kodat faced Gerard Campaña Lee whom he defeated 6-1, 7-5. In the final, Kodat lost 6-2, 6-4 to Francisco Comesana.

In the first week of August, Kodat entered the ATP Challenger 100 in Banja Luka as a special exempt due to advancing to the final in Liberec the prior week. In the first round, Kodat faced Ugo Blanchet who also entered as a special exempt. Kodat defeated Blachet 6-4, 6-3. In the second round, Kodat faced Eric Vanshelboim whom he defeated 7-5, 6-1 to reach the quarterfinals.

== Junior Grand Slam finals ==
=== Singles: 1 (1 runner-up) ===
Result	Year	Tournament	Surface	Opponent	Score
Loss	2019	French Open	Clay	(Denmark) Holger Rune	3–6, 7–6^{(7–5)}, 0–6

== ATP Challenger and ITF World Tennis Tour finals ==
=== Singles: 5 (3 titles, 2 runner-ups) ===
Legend (singles) ATP Challenger Tour (0–1) ITF WTT (3–1)	Finals by surface Hard (0–0) Clay (3–2) Grass (0–0) Carpet (0–0)

Result	W–L	Date	Tournament	Tier	Surface	Opponent	Score
Loss	0–1	Jul 2023	Svijany Open, Czech Republic	Challenger	Clay	(Argentina) Francisco Comesaña	2–6, 4–6

Result	W–L	Date	Tournament	Tier	Surface	Opponent	Score
Loss	0–1	Dec 2020	M15 Cairo, Egypt	WTT	Clay	(Argentina) Juan Bautista Torres	3–6, 3–6
Win	1–1	Jan 2021	M15 Antalya, Turkey	WTT	Clay	(France) Maxime Hamou	6–4, 6–2
Win	2–1	Jul 2024	M25 Kramsach, Austria	WTT	Clay	(France) Lilian Marmousez	6–2, 6–7^{(5–7)}, 6–4
Win	3–1	Aug 2024	M25 Oldenzaal, Netherlands	WTT	Clay	(Netherlands) Max Houkes	3–6, 6–2, 7–5

=== Doubles: 7 (4 titles, 3 runner-ups) ===
Legend (doubles) ATP Challenger Tour (0–0) ITF WTT (4–3)	Finals by surface Hard (0–0) Clay (4–3) Grass (0–0) Carpet (0–0)

Result	W–L	Date	Tournament	Tier	Surface	Partner	Opponents	Score
Win	1–0	Feb 2020	M25 Naples, USA	WTT	Clay	(United States) Martin Damm Jr	(Colombia) Nicolás Barrientos (Colombia) Cristian Rodríguez	4–6, 6–4, [10–7]
Loss	1–1	Oct 2020	M25 Pardubice, Czech Republic	WTT	Clay	(United States) Christian Harrison	(Uruguay) Martín Cuevas (Argentina) Agustín Velotti	6–3, 3–6, [6–10]
Win	2–1	May 2021	M15 Antalya, Turkey	WTT	Clay	(Germany) Timo Stodder	(Argentina) Mariano Navone (Chile) Miguel Fernando Pereira	6–4, 6–4
Win	3–1	Aug 2021	M15 Říčany, Czech Republic	WTT	Clay	(Czech Republic) Adam Pavlásek	(Bulgaria) Alexander Donski (Northern Mariana Islands) Colin Sinclair	6–3, 7–5
Win	4–1	Aug 2022	M15 Kottingbrunn, Austria	WTT	Clay	(Slovakia) Miloš Karol	(Italy) Francesco Ferrari (Italy) Alessio Zanotti	7–6^{(7–3)}, 7–5
Loss	4–2	Sep 2022	M25 Pardubice, Czech Republic	WTT	Clay	(Slovakia) Miloš Karol	(Czech Republic) Matyáš Černý (Czech Republic) Dominik Reček	4–6, 2–6
Loss	4–3	Jul 2023	M25 Kramsach, Austria	WTT	Clay	(United Kingdom) Anton Matusevich	(Germany) Peter Heller (Germany) Kai Wehnelt	4–6, 4–6
