= Svijany Open =

- 2025 Svijany Open

ATP Challenger Tour
- Event name: Liberec
- Location: Liberec, Czech Republic
- Venue: Liberec Tennis Club
- Category: ATP Challenger Tour
- Surface: Red clay
- Draw: 32S/32Q/16D
- Prize money: €74,825 (2024), €43,000
- Website: Website

The Svijany Open is a professional tennis tournament played on outdoor red clay courts. It is currently part of the Association of Tennis Professionals (ATP) Challenger Tour. The first edition was held in 2013. It is held annually at the Liberec Tennis Club in Liberec, Czechia.

== Past finals ==
=== Singles ===
Year	Champion	Runner-up	Score
2026	(Czech Republic) Jan Kumstát	(Peru) Gonzalo Bueno	6–3, 6–1
2025	(Peru) Gonzalo Bueno	(Argentina) Genaro Alberto Olivieri	6–2, 2–0 ret.
2024	(Bolivia) Hugo Dellien	(Denmark) Elmer Møller	5–7, 6–4, 6–1
2023	(Argentina) Francisco Comesaña	(United States) Toby Kodat	6–2, 6–4
2022	(Czech Republic) Jiří Lehečka	(Spain) Nicolás Álvarez Varona	6–4, 6–4
2021	(Slovakia) Alex Molčan	(Czech Republic) Tomáš Macháč	6–0, 6–1
2020	Not held		
2019	(Serbia) Nikola Milojević	(Brazil) Rogério Dutra Silva	6–3, 3–6, 6–4
2018	(Slovakia) Andrej Martin	(Portugal) Pedro Sousa	6–1, 6–2
2017	(Portugal) Pedro Sousa	(Brazil) Guilherme Clezar	6–4, 5–7, 6–2
2016	(Belgium) Arthur De Greef	(Belgium) Steve Darcis	7–6^{(7–4)}, 6–3
2015	(Germany) Tobias Kamke	(Slovakia) Andrej Martin	7–6^{(8–6)}, 6–4
2014	(Slovakia) Andrej Martin	(Argentina) Horacio Zeballos	1–6, 6–1, 6–4
2013	(Czech Republic) Jiří Veselý	(Argentina) Federico Delbonis	6–7^{(2-7)}, 7–6^{(9–7)}, 6-4

=== Doubles ===
Year	Champions	Runners-up	Score
2026	(Spain) Íñigo Cervantes (Ukraine) Denys Molchanov	(Austria) Maximilian Neuchrist (Czech Republic) David Poljak	7–6^{(9–7)}, 6–3
2025	(Czech Republic) Andrew Paulson (Czech Republic) Michael Vrbenský	(Czech Republic) Jiří Barnat (Czech Republic) Filip Duda	6–4, 6–1
2024	(Czech Republic) Jonáš Forejtek (Czech Republic) Michael Vrbenský	(Slovakia) Miloš Karol (Slovakia) Tomáš Lánik	7–5, 6–7^{(5–7)}, [10–4]
2023	(Czech Republic) Petr Nouza (Czech Republic) Andrew Paulson	(Austria) Neil Oberleitner (Germany) Tim Sandkaulen	6–3, 6–4
2022	(Austria) Neil Oberleitner (Austria) Philipp Oswald	(Czech Republic) Roman Jebavý (Czech Republic) Adam Pavlásek	7–6^{(7–5)}, 6–2
2021	(Czech Republic) Roman Jebavý (Slovakia) Igor Zelenay	(France) Geoffrey Blancaneaux (France) Maxime Janvier	6–2, 6–7^{(6–8)}, [10–5]
2020	Not held		
2019	(Czech Republic) Jonáš Forejtek (Czech Republic) Michael Vrbenský	(Serbia) Nikola Čačić (Croatia) Antonio Šančić	6–4, 6–3
2018	(Belgium) Sander Gillé (Belgium) Joran Vliegen	(Slovakia) Filip Polášek (Czech Republic) Patrik Rikl	6–3, 6–4
2017	(Lithuania) Laurynas Grigelis (Czech Republic) Zdeněk Kolář	(Poland) Tomasz Bednarek (Netherlands) David Pel	6–3, 6–4
2016	(France) Jonathan Eysseric (Brazil) André Ghem	(Uruguay) Ariel Behar (Croatia) Dino Marcan	6–0, 6–4
2015	(Slovakia) Andrej Martin (Chile) Hans Podlipnik	(Netherlands) Wesley Koolhof (Netherlands) Matwé Middelkoop	7–5, 6–7^{3–7}, [10–5]
2014	(Czech Republic) Roman Jebavý (Czech Republic) Jaroslav Pospíšil	(Philippines) Ruben Gonzales (United Kingdom) Sean Thornley	6–4, 6–3
2013	(Australia) Rameez Junaid (Germany) Tim Puetz	(Australia) Colin Ebelthite (Chinese Taipei) Lee Hsin-han	6–0, 6–2
