= 2025 ATP Challenger Tour =

Secondary tennis circuit season

Details
- Duration: 30 December 2024 – 30 November 2025
- Edition: 48th (17th under this name)
- Tournaments: 217
- Categories: Challenger 175 (6); Challenger 125 (35); Challenger 100 (41); Challenger 75 (98); Challenger 50 (37)

Achievements (singles)
- Most titles: (Norway) Nicolai Budkov Kjær (United Kingdom) Jan Choinski (Croatia) Borna Ćorić (Chile) Cristian Garín (United States) Patrick Kypson (United States) Emilio Nava (4)
- Most finals: (Canada) Liam Draxl (7)

The Association of Tennis Professionals (ATP) Challenger Tour in 2025 was the secondary professional tennis circuit organized by the ATP. The 2025 ATP Challenger Tour calendar comprised 217 tournaments with prize money ranging from $60,000 up to $250,000. It was the 48th edition of Challenger tournaments cycle and 17th under the name of Challenger Tour.

== Schedule ==
This was the complete schedule of events on the 2025 calendar, with player progression documented from the quarterfinals stage.

=== January ===
Week of	Tournament	Champions	Runners-up	Semifinalists	Quarterfinalists
December 30	Canberra Tennis International; Canberra, Australia; Hard – Challenger 125 – 32S/24Q/16D; Singles – Doubles	(Brazil) João Fonseca; 6–4, 6–4	(United States) Ethan Quinn	(Spain) Martín Landaluce (United Kingdom) Jacob Fearnley	(Japan) Yosuke Watanuki (Czech Republic) Vít Kopřiva (United States) Christopher Eubanks (France) Harold Mayot
December 30	Canberra Tennis International; Canberra, Australia; Hard – Challenger 125 – 32S/24Q/16D; Singles – Doubles	(United States) Ryan Seggerman (United States) Eliot Spizzirri; 1–6, 7–5, [10–5]	(France) Pierre-Hugues Herbert (Switzerland) Jérôme Kym	(Spain) Martín Landaluce (United Kingdom) Jacob Fearnley	(Japan) Yosuke Watanuki (Czech Republic) Vít Kopřiva (United States) Christopher Eubanks (France) Harold Mayot
December 30	Open Nouvelle-Calédonie; Nouméa, New Caledonia; Hard – Challenger 100 – 32S/24Q/16D; Singles – Doubles	(Japan) Shintaro Mochizuki; 6–1, 6–3	(Australia) Moerani Bouzige	(Austria) Jurij Rodionov (France) Constant Lestienne	(France) Enzo Couacaud (Japan) Taisei Ichikawa (Monaco) Valentin Vacherot (Hungary) Márton Fucsovics
December 30	Open Nouvelle-Calédonie; Nouméa, New Caledonia; Hard – Challenger 100 – 32S/24Q/16D; Singles – Doubles	(Australia) Blake Bayldon (Northern Mariana Islands) Colin Sinclair; 6–3, 7–5	(Japan) Ryuki Matsuda (Japan) Ryotaro Taguchi	(Austria) Jurij Rodionov (France) Constant Lestienne	(France) Enzo Couacaud (Japan) Taisei Ichikawa (Monaco) Valentin Vacherot (Hungary) Márton Fucsovics
December 30	Nonthaburi Challenger; Nonthaburi, Thailand; Hard – Challenger 75 – 32S/24Q/16D; Singles – Doubles	Aslan Karatsev; 7–6^{(7–5)}, 7–5	(France) Grégoire Barrère	(Belgium) Kimmer Coppejans (Japan) Rei Sakamoto	(Italy) Enrico Dalla Valle (Austria) Lukas Neumayer (Italy) Gianluca Mager (Uzbekistan) Khumoyun Sultanov
December 30	Nonthaburi Challenger; Nonthaburi, Thailand; Hard – Challenger 75 – 32S/24Q/16D; Singles – Doubles	(Japan) Kokoro Isomura (Japan) Rio Noguchi; 7–6^{(7–3)}, 7–6^{(11–9)}	(Czech Republic) Zdeněk Kolář (Austria) Neil Oberleitner	(Belgium) Kimmer Coppejans (Japan) Rei Sakamoto	(Italy) Enrico Dalla Valle (Austria) Lukas Neumayer (Italy) Gianluca Mager (Uzbekistan) Khumoyun Sultanov
January 6	Nonthaburi Challenger II; Nonthaburi, Thailand; Hard – Challenger 75 – 32S/24Q/16D; Singles – Doubles	(Japan) Rio Noguchi; 7–6^{(11–9)}, 6–2	(China) Cui Jie	(United States) Murphy Cassone; Marat Sharipov	(Thailand) Maximus Jones (Switzerland) Jakub Paul (Japan) Yusuke Takahashi (Poland) Daniel Michalski
January 6	Nonthaburi Challenger II; Nonthaburi, Thailand; Hard – Challenger 75 – 32S/24Q/16D; Singles – Doubles	(Chinese Taipei) Ray Ho (Austria) Neil Oberleitner; 6–4, 7–6^{(7–5)}	(Israel) Daniel Cukierman (United Kingdom) Joshua Paris	(United States) Murphy Cassone; Marat Sharipov	(Thailand) Maximus Jones (Switzerland) Jakub Paul (Japan) Yusuke Takahashi (Poland) Daniel Michalski
January 6	Lexus Nottingham Challenger; Nottingham, United Kingdom; Hard (i) – Challenger 75 – 32S/24Q/16D; Singles – Doubles	(Norway) Viktor Durasovic; 7–6^{(8–6)}, 3–6, 6–1	(United Kingdom) Henry Searle	(Switzerland) Mika Brunold (United Kingdom) Anton Matusevich	(Slovakia) Lukáš Pokorný (Luxembourg) Chris Rodesch (Slovakia) Norbert Gombos (Austria) Dennis Novak
January 6	Lexus Nottingham Challenger; Nottingham, United Kingdom; Hard (i) – Challenger 75 – 32S/24Q/16D; Singles – Doubles	(Czech Republic) Jonáš Forejtek (Czech Republic) Michael Vrbenský; 7–6^{(7–5)}, 7–6^{(7–5)}	(Czech Republic) Jiří Barnat (Czech Republic) Filip Duda	(Switzerland) Mika Brunold (United Kingdom) Anton Matusevich	(Slovakia) Lukáš Pokorný (Luxembourg) Chris Rodesch (Slovakia) Norbert Gombos (Austria) Dennis Novak
January 6	Oeiras Indoors; Oeiras, Portugal; Hard (i) – Challenger 75 – 32S/24Q/16D; Singles – Doubles	(Serbia) Hamad Medjedovic; 6–1, 6–3	(Canada) Liam Draxl	(Spain) Daniel Rincón (Germany) Rudolf Molleker	(Hungary) Zsombor Piros (Germany) Max Hans Rehberg (France) Antoine Cornut-Chauvinc (Switzerland) Alexander Ritschard
January 6	Oeiras Indoors; Oeiras, Portugal; Hard (i) – Challenger 75 – 32S/24Q/16D; Singles – Doubles	(United States) George Goldhoff (United States) Trey Hilderbrand; 7–5, 2–6, [10–5]	(Japan) Kaichi Uchida (Kazakhstan) Denis Yevseyev	(Spain) Daniel Rincón (Germany) Rudolf Molleker	(Hungary) Zsombor Piros (Germany) Max Hans Rehberg (France) Antoine Cornut-Chauvinc (Switzerland) Alexander Ritschard
January 13	Oeiras Indoors II; Oeiras, Portugal; Hard (i) – Challenger 100 – 32S/24Q/16D; Singles – Doubles	(United States) Aleksandar Kovacevic; 6–4, 7–6^{(7–4)}	(Hungary) Zsombor Piros	(Canada) Alexis Galarneau (United States) Mackenzie McDonald	(Kazakhstan) Beibit Zhukayev (Switzerland) Alexander Ritschard (Portugal) Frederico Ferreira Silva (Serbia) Hamad Medjedovic
January 13	Oeiras Indoors II; Oeiras, Portugal; Hard (i) – Challenger 100 – 32S/24Q/16D; Singles – Doubles	(Croatia) Mili Poljičak (Serbia) Matej Sabanov; 6–0, 6–1	(Spain) Íñigo Cervantes (Netherlands) Mick Veldheer	(Canada) Alexis Galarneau (United States) Mackenzie McDonald	(Kazakhstan) Beibit Zhukayev (Switzerland) Alexander Ritschard (Portugal) Frederico Ferreira Silva (Serbia) Hamad Medjedovic
January 13	Nonthaburi Challenger III; Nonthaburi, Thailand; Hard – Challenger 75 – 32S/24Q/16D; Singles – Doubles	(United States) Brandon Holt; 6–3, 6–2	(Czech Republic) Vít Kopřiva	(United States) Murphy Cassone (France) Clément Tabur	(Czech Republic) Dalibor Svrčina (Italy) Federico Arnaboldi (United States) Zachary Svajda (France) Hugo Grenier
January 13	Nonthaburi Challenger III; Nonthaburi, Thailand; Hard – Challenger 75 – 32S/24Q/16D; Singles – Doubles	(Chinese Taipei) Ray Ho (Austria) Neil Oberleitner; 6–3, 6–4	(Thailand) Pruchya Isaro (China) Wang Aoran	(United States) Murphy Cassone (France) Clément Tabur	(Czech Republic) Dalibor Svrčina (Italy) Federico Arnaboldi (United States) Zachary Svajda (France) Hugo Grenier
January 13	Challenger de Tigre; Tigre, Argentina; Clay – Challenger 50 – 32S/24Q/16D; Singles – Doubles	(Peru) Juan Pablo Varillas; 6–4, 6–4	(Paraguay) Daniel Vallejo	(Ecuador) Álvaro Guillén Meza (Peru) Gonzalo Bueno	(Argentina) Gonzalo Villanueva (Argentina) Santiago Rodríguez Taverna (United States) Emilio Nava (Bolivia) Murkel Dellien
January 13	Challenger de Tigre; Tigre, Argentina; Clay – Challenger 50 – 32S/24Q/16D; Singles – Doubles	(Argentina) Mariano Kestelboim (Argentina) Gonzalo Villanueva; 6–2, 7–5	(Brazil) Luís Britto (Uruguay) Franco Roncadelli	(Ecuador) Álvaro Guillén Meza (Peru) Gonzalo Bueno	(Argentina) Gonzalo Villanueva (Argentina) Santiago Rodríguez Taverna (United States) Emilio Nava (Bolivia) Murkel Dellien
January 20	Open Quimper Bretagne; Quimper, France; Hard (i) – Challenger 125 – 32S/24Q/16D; Singles – Doubles	(France) Sascha Gueymard Wayenburg; 6–7^{(3–7)}, 6–1, 6–2	(France) Pierre-Hugues Herbert	(France) Matteo Martineau (Lithuania) Ričardas Berankis	(Serbia) Laslo Djere (Ukraine) Vitaliy Sachko (Denmark) Elmer Møller (France) Titouan Droguet
January 20	Open Quimper Bretagne; Quimper, France; Hard (i) – Challenger 125 – 32S/24Q/16D; Singles – Doubles	(France) Sadio Doumbia (France) Fabien Reboul; 6–2, 4–6, [10–3]	(Monaco) Romain Arneodo (France) Manuel Guinard	(France) Matteo Martineau (Lithuania) Ričardas Berankis	(Serbia) Laslo Djere (Ukraine) Vitaliy Sachko (Denmark) Elmer Møller (France) Titouan Droguet
January 20	Oeiras Indoors III; Oeiras, Portugal; Hard (i) – Challenger 100 – 32S/24Q/16D; Singles – Doubles	(Belgium) Alexander Blockx; 7–5, 6–1	(Canada) Liam Draxl	(Canada) Alexis Galarneau (Estonia) Mark Lajal	(France) Valentin Royer (Colombia) Nicolás Mejía (Georgia (country)) Nikoloz Basilashvili (Kazakhstan) Beibit Zhukayev
January 20	Oeiras Indoors III; Oeiras, Portugal; Hard (i) – Challenger 100 – 32S/24Q/16D; Singles – Doubles	(Canada) Liam Draxl (Canada) Cleeve Harper; 1–6, 7–5, [10–6]	(Netherlands) Matwé Middelkoop (Ukraine) Denys Molchanov	(Canada) Alexis Galarneau (Estonia) Mark Lajal	(France) Valentin Royer (Colombia) Nicolás Mejía (Georgia (country)) Nikoloz Basilashvili (Kazakhstan) Beibit Zhukayev
January 20	Punta Open; Punta del Este, Uruguay; Clay – Challenger 75 – 32S/24Q/16D; Singles – Doubles	(Colombia) Daniel Elahi Galán; 5–7, 6–4, 6–4	(Chile) Tomás Barrios Vera	(United States) Emilio Nava (Spain) Carlos Taberner	(Argentina) Federico Coria (Peru) Gonzalo Bueno (Argentina) Lautaro Midón (Argentina) Marco Trungelliti
January 20	Punta Open; Punta del Este, Uruguay; Clay – Challenger 75 – 32S/24Q/16D; Singles – Doubles	(Brazil) Gustavo Heide (Brazil) João Lucas Reis da Silva; 6–2, 6–3	(Argentina) Facundo Mena (Argentina) Marco Trungelliti	(United States) Emilio Nava (Spain) Carlos Taberner	(Argentina) Federico Coria (Peru) Gonzalo Bueno (Argentina) Lautaro Midón (Argentina) Marco Trungelliti
January 27	Koblenz Open; Koblenz, Germany; Hard (i) – Challenger 100 – 32S/24Q/16D; Singles – Doubles	(France) Ugo Blanchet; 6–3, 3–6, 7–6^{(7–5)}	(Italy) Luca Nardi	(Italy) Giulio Zeppieri (Switzerland) Jakub Paul	(Germany) Henri Squire (Switzerland) Mika Brunold (France) Matteo Martineau; Alexey Vatutin
January 27	Koblenz Open; Koblenz, Germany; Hard (i) – Challenger 100 – 32S/24Q/16D; Singles – Doubles	(Switzerland) Jakub Paul (Netherlands) David Pel; Walkover	(France) Geoffrey Blancaneaux (United Kingdom) Joshua Paris	(Italy) Giulio Zeppieri (Switzerland) Jakub Paul	(Germany) Henri Squire (Switzerland) Mika Brunold (France) Matteo Martineau; Alexey Vatutin
January 27	Brasil Tennis Challenger; Piracicaba, Brazil; Clay – Challenger 100 – 32S/24Q/16D; Singles – Doubles	(Argentina) Román Andrés Burruchaga; 7–6^{(10–8)}, 6–7^{(6–8)}, 7–6^{(7–4)}	(Argentina) Facundo Mena	(Brazil) Gustavo Heide (Bolivia) Hugo Dellien	(Argentina) Camilo Ugo Carabelli (Spain) Carlos Taberner (Argentina) Juan Pablo Ficovich (Argentina) Federico Coria
January 27	Brasil Tennis Challenger; Piracicaba, Brazil; Clay – Challenger 100 – 32S/24Q/16D; Singles – Doubles	(Argentina) Guido Andreozzi (Brazil) Orlando Luz; 6–7^{(4–7)}, 6–2, [11–9]	(Brazil) Marcelo Demoliner (Brazil) Fernando Romboli	(Brazil) Gustavo Heide (Bolivia) Hugo Dellien	(Argentina) Camilo Ugo Carabelli (Spain) Carlos Taberner (Argentina) Juan Pablo Ficovich (Argentina) Federico Coria
January 27	Queensland International; Brisbane, Australia; Hard – Challenger 75 – 32S/24Q/16D; Singles – Doubles	(Australia) Tristan Schoolkate; 7–6^{(7–3)}, 7–6^{(7–4)}	(Czech Republic) Marek Gengel	(Australia) Omar Jasika (Australia) Adam Walton	(Australia) James McCabe (Australia) Blake Ellis (Australia) Alex Bolt (Australia) Bernard Tomic
January 27	Queensland International; Brisbane, Australia; Hard – Challenger 75 – 32S/24Q/16D; Singles – Doubles	(Australia) Matthew Romios (Northern Mariana Islands) Colin Sinclair; 7–6^{(7–2)}, 7–5	(Australia) Joshua Charlton (Australia) Patrick Harper	(Australia) Omar Jasika (Australia) Adam Walton	(Australia) James McCabe (Australia) Blake Ellis (Australia) Alex Bolt (Australia) Bernard Tomic
January 27	Cleveland Open; Cleveland, United States; Hard (i) – Challenger 75 – 32S/24Q/16D; Singles – Doubles	(United States) Colton Smith; 6–4, 6–7^{(6–8)}, 6–3	(United States) Eliot Spizzirri	(United States) Tyler Zink (United States) J. J. Wolf	(United States) Murphy Cassone (Japan) James Trotter (Brazil) Karuê Sell (United States) Stefan Kozlov
January 27	Cleveland Open; Cleveland, United States; Hard (i) – Challenger 75 – 32S/24Q/16D; Singles – Doubles	(United States) Robert Cash (United States) JJ Tracy; 7–6^{(7–4)}, 6–1	(Canada) Juan Carlos Aguilar (Poland) Filip Pieczonka	(United States) Tyler Zink (United States) J. J. Wolf	(United States) Murphy Cassone (Japan) James Trotter (Brazil) Karuê Sell (United States) Stefan Kozlov

=== February ===
Week of	Tournament	Champions	Runners-up	Semifinalists	Quarterfinalists
February 3	Play In Challenger; Lille, France; Hard (i) – Challenger 125 – 32S/24Q/16D; Singles – Doubles	(France) Arthur Bouquier; 6–3, 3–5 ret.	(France) Lucas Pouille	(France) Calvin Hemery (France) Valentin Royer	(France) Tom Paris (Germany) Max Hans Rehberg (Belgium) Alexander Blockx (France) Arthur Géa
February 3	Play In Challenger; Lille, France; Hard (i) – Challenger 125 – 32S/24Q/16D; Singles – Doubles	(Switzerland) Jakub Paul (Netherlands) David Pel; 6–3, 6–4	(Poland) Karol Drzewiecki (Poland) Piotr Matuszewski	(France) Calvin Hemery (France) Valentin Royer	(France) Tom Paris (Germany) Max Hans Rehberg (Belgium) Alexander Blockx (France) Arthur Géa
February 3	Rosario Challenger; Rosario, Argentina; Clay – Challenger 125 – 32S/24Q/16D; Singles – Doubles	(Argentina) Camilo Ugo Carabelli; 3–6, 6–3, 6–2	(Bolivia) Hugo Dellien	(Argentina) Sebastián Báez (Bolivia) Murkel Dellien	(Italy) Francesco Passaro (Argentina) Francisco Comesaña (Argentina) Juan Pablo Ficovich (Argentina) Juan Manuel Cerúndolo
February 3	Rosario Challenger; Rosario, Argentina; Clay – Challenger 125 – 32S/24Q/16D; Singles – Doubles	(Brazil) Marcelo Demoliner (Brazil) Fernando Romboli; 7–5, 6–3	(Argentina) Guido Andreozzi (France) Théo Arribagé	(Argentina) Sebastián Báez (Bolivia) Murkel Dellien	(Italy) Francesco Passaro (Argentina) Francisco Comesaña (Argentina) Juan Pablo Ficovich (Argentina) Juan Manuel Cerúndolo
February 3	Chennai Open Challenger; Chennai, India; Hard – Challenger 100 – 32S/24Q/16D; Singles – Doubles	(France) Kyrian Jacquet; 7–6^{(7–1)}, 6–4	(Sweden) Elias Ymer	(United Kingdom) Billy Harris (Czech Republic) Dalibor Svrčina	(Kazakhstan) Timofey Skatov (Japan) Rio Noguchi (Japan) Shintaro Mochizuki (Ukraine) Oleksandr Ovcharenko
February 3	Chennai Open Challenger; Chennai, India; Hard – Challenger 100 – 32S/24Q/16D; Singles – Doubles	(Japan) Shintaro Mochizuki (Japan) Kaito Uesugi; 6–4, 6–4	(India) Saketh Myneni (India) Ramkumar Ramanathan	(United Kingdom) Billy Harris (Czech Republic) Dalibor Svrčina	(Kazakhstan) Timofey Skatov (Japan) Rio Noguchi (Japan) Shintaro Mochizuki (Ukraine) Oleksandr Ovcharenko
February 3	Queensland International II; Brisbane, Australia; Hard – Challenger 75 – 32S/24Q/16D; Singles – Doubles	(Australia) Adam Walton; 7–6^{(8–6)}, 7–6^{(7–4)}	(Australia) Jason Kubler	(Australia) Omar Jasika (United States) Christian Langmo	(United States) Andre Ilagan (Australia) Li Tu (Japan) Yuta Shimizu (Australia) James McCabe
February 3	Queensland International II; Brisbane, Australia; Hard – Challenger 75 – 32S/24Q/16D; Singles – Doubles	(Australia) Joshua Charlton (Australia) Patrick Harper; 4–6, 7–6^{(7–5)}, [12–10]	(Australia) Matt Hulme (New Zealand) James Watt	(Australia) Omar Jasika (United States) Christian Langmo	(United States) Andre Ilagan (Australia) Li Tu (Japan) Yuta Shimizu (Australia) James McCabe
February 3	Tenerife Challenger; Tenerife, Spain; Hard – Challenger 75 – 32S/24Q/16D; Singles – Doubles	(Spain) Pablo Carreño Busta; 6–3, 6–2	(Spain) Alejandro Moro Cañas	(Spain) Pol Martín Tiffon (Portugal) Henrique Rocha	(United Kingdom) Johannus Monday (Lithuania) Vilius Gaubas (Jordan) Abdullah Shelbayh (Lebanon) Benjamin Hassan
February 3	Tenerife Challenger; Tenerife, Spain; Hard – Challenger 75 – 32S/24Q/16D; Singles – Doubles	(Spain) Íñigo Cervantes (Spain) Daniel Rincón; 6–2, 6–4	(Spain) Nicolás Álvarez Varona (Spain) Iñaki Montes de la Torre	(Spain) Pol Martín Tiffon (Portugal) Henrique Rocha	(United Kingdom) Johannus Monday (Lithuania) Vilius Gaubas (Jordan) Abdullah Shelbayh (Lebanon) Benjamin Hassan
February 10	Bahrain Ministry of Interior Tennis Challenger; Manama, Bahrain; Hard – Challenger 125 – 32S/24Q/16D; Singles – Doubles	(Hungary) Márton Fucsovics; 6–3, 6–7^{(3–7)}, 6–4	(Italy) Andrea Vavassori	Marat Sharipov (United States) Brandon Holt	(Norway) Viktor Durasovic (Croatia) Duje Ajduković (Canada) Alexis Galarneau (France) Térence Atmane
February 10	Bahrain Ministry of Interior Tennis Challenger; Manama, Bahrain; Hard – Challenger 125 – 32S/24Q/16D; Singles – Doubles	(Ukraine) Vitaliy Sachko (Kazakhstan) Beibit Zhukayev; 6–4, 6–0	Ivan Liutarevich (France) Luca Sanchez	Marat Sharipov (United States) Brandon Holt	(Norway) Viktor Durasovic (Croatia) Duje Ajduković (Canada) Alexis Galarneau (France) Térence Atmane
February 10	Delhi Open; New Delhi, India; Hard – Challenger 75 – 32S/24Q/16D; Singles – Doubles	(France) Kyrian Jacquet; 6–4, 6–2	(United Kingdom) Billy Harris	(Czech Republic) Vít Kopřiva (Australia) Tristan Schoolkate	(Japan) Shintaro Mochizuki (Belgium) Michael Geerts (United States) Andre Ilagan (Sweden) Elias Ymer
February 10	Delhi Open; New Delhi, India; Hard – Challenger 75 – 32S/24Q/16D; Singles – Doubles	(Japan) Masamichi Imamura (Japan) Rio Noguchi; 6–4, 6–3	(India) Niki Kaliyanda Poonacha (Zimbabwe) Courtney John Lock	(Czech Republic) Vít Kopřiva (Australia) Tristan Schoolkate	(Japan) Shintaro Mochizuki (Belgium) Michael Geerts (United States) Andre Ilagan (Sweden) Elias Ymer
February 10	Tenerife Challenger II; Tenerife, Spain; Hard – Challenger 75 – 32S/24Q/16D; Singles – Doubles	(Spain) Pablo Carreño Busta; 6–3, 6–2	(Austria) Filip Misolic	(Spain) Daniel Rincón (Lebanon) Benjamin Hassan	(Germany) Dominik Koepfer (Spain) Nicolás Álvarez Varona (Jordan) Abdullah Shelbayh (Spain) Javier Barranco Cosano
February 10	Tenerife Challenger II; Tenerife, Spain; Hard – Challenger 75 – 32S/24Q/16D; Singles – Doubles	(Peru) Alexander Merino (Germany) Christoph Negritu; 2–6, 6–3, [10–8]	(Israel) Daniel Cukierman (United Kingdom) Joshua Paris	(Spain) Daniel Rincón (Lebanon) Benjamin Hassan	(Germany) Dominik Koepfer (Spain) Nicolás Álvarez Varona (Jordan) Abdullah Shelbayh (Spain) Javier Barranco Cosano
February 17	Teréga Open Pau–Pyrénées; Pau, France; Hard (i) – Challenger 125 – 32S/24Q/16D; Singles – Doubles	(Belgium) Raphaël Collignon; 6–2, 6–4	(Germany) Patrick Zahraj	(Slovakia) Lukáš Klein (France) Arthur Bouquier	(United Kingdom) Jacob Fearnley (United Kingdom) Arthur Fery (United States) Murphy Cassone (Austria) Filip Misolic
February 17	Teréga Open Pau–Pyrénées; Pau, France; Hard (i) – Challenger 125 – 32S/24Q/16D; Singles – Doubles	(Germany) Jakob Schnaitter (Germany) Mark Wallner; 6–4, 6–7^{(5–7)}, [10–8]	(Belgium) Alexander Blockx (Belgium) Raphaël Collignon	(Slovakia) Lukáš Klein (France) Arthur Bouquier	(United Kingdom) Jacob Fearnley (United Kingdom) Arthur Fery (United States) Murphy Cassone (Austria) Filip Misolic
February 17	Pune Challenger; Pune, India; Hard – Challenger 100 – 32S/24Q/16D; Singles – Doubles	(Czech Republic) Dalibor Svrčina; 7–6^{(7–3)}, 6–1	(United States) Brandon Holt	(Canada) Alexis Galarneau (Uzbekistan) Khumoyun Sultanov	(United Kingdom) Billy Harris (Monaco) Valentin Vacherot (France) Ugo Blanchet; Ilia Simakin
February 17	Pune Challenger; Pune, India; Hard – Challenger 100 – 32S/24Q/16D; Singles – Doubles	(India) Jeevan Nedunchezhiyan (India) Vijay Sundar Prashanth; 3–6, 6–3, [10–0]	(Australia) Blake Bayldon (Australia) Matthew Romios	(Canada) Alexis Galarneau (Uzbekistan) Khumoyun Sultanov	(United Kingdom) Billy Harris (Monaco) Valentin Vacherot (France) Ugo Blanchet; Ilia Simakin
February 17	Glasgow Challenger; Glasgow, United Kingdom; Hard (i) – Challenger 75 – 32S/24Q/16D; Singles – Doubles	(Norway) Nicolai Budkov Kjær; 6–4, 6–3	(Norway) Viktor Durasovic	(Germany) Max Hans Rehberg (Spain) Daniel Rincón	(United Kingdom) Johannus Monday (Canada) Liam Draxl (Kazakhstan) Denis Yevseyev (France) Matteo Martineau
February 17	Glasgow Challenger; Glasgow, United Kingdom; Hard (i) – Challenger 75 – 32S/24Q/16D; Singles – Doubles	(Israel) Daniel Cukierman (United Kingdom) Joshua Paris; 5–7, 6–4, [12–10]	(United States) Vasil Kirkov (United Kingdom) Marcus Willis	(Germany) Max Hans Rehberg (Spain) Daniel Rincón	(United Kingdom) Johannus Monday (Canada) Liam Draxl (Kazakhstan) Denis Yevseyev (France) Matteo Martineau
February 17	Brazzaville Challenger; Brazzaville, Republic of the Congo; Clay – Challenger 50 – 32S/24Q/16D; Singles – Doubles	(France) Geoffrey Blancaneaux; 6–3, 6–4	(France) Calvin Hemery	(Thailand) Maximus Jones (Bulgaria) Dinko Dinev	(Italy) Franco Agamenone (Netherlands) Max Houkes (Ivory Coast) Eliakim Coulibaly (Brazil) Paulo André Saraiva dos Santos
February 17	Brazzaville Challenger; Brazzaville, Republic of the Congo; Clay – Challenger 50 – 32S/24Q/16D; Singles – Doubles	(Brazil) Mateo Barreiros Reyes (Brazil) Paulo André Saraiva dos Santos; 6–4, 1–6, [10–6]	(France) Geoffrey Blancaneaux (France) Maxime Chazal	(Thailand) Maximus Jones (Bulgaria) Dinko Dinev	(Italy) Franco Agamenone (Netherlands) Max Houkes (Ivory Coast) Eliakim Coulibaly (Brazil) Paulo André Saraiva dos Santos
February 24	Bengaluru Open; Bangalore, India; Hard – Challenger 125 – 32S/24Q/16D; Singles – Doubles	(United States) Brandon Holt; 6–3, 6–3	(Japan) Shintaro Mochizuki	(Australia) James McCabe (United Kingdom) Billy Harris	(Czech Republic) Hynek Bartoň (Colombia) Nicolás Mejía; Petr Bar Biryukov (Australia) Tristan Schoolkate
February 24	Bengaluru Open; Bangalore, India; Hard – Challenger 125 – 32S/24Q/16D; Singles – Doubles	(India) Anirudh Chandrasekar (Chinese Taipei) Ray Ho; 6–2, 6–4	(Australia) Blake Bayldon (Australia) Matthew Romios	(Australia) James McCabe (United Kingdom) Billy Harris	(Czech Republic) Hynek Bartoň (Colombia) Nicolás Mejía; Petr Bar Biryukov (Australia) Tristan Schoolkate
February 24	San Diego Open; San Diego, United States; Hard – Challenger 100 – 32S/24Q/16D; Singles – Doubles	(United States) Eliot Spizzirri; 6–4, 2–6, 6–4	(United States) Mackenzie McDonald	(United States) Ethan Quinn (Poland) Kamil Majchrzak	(France) Arthur Cazaux (Japan) Taro Daniel (United States) Trevor Svajda (Australia) Alex Bolt
February 24	San Diego Open; San Diego, United States; Hard – Challenger 100 – 32S/24Q/16D; Singles – Doubles	(United States) Eliot Spizzirri (United States) Tyler Zink; 6–7^{(3–7)}, 7–6^{(7–4)}, [10–8]	(Venezuela) Juan José Bianchi (United States) Noah Zamora	(United States) Ethan Quinn (Poland) Kamil Majchrzak	(France) Arthur Cazaux (Japan) Taro Daniel (United States) Trevor Svajda (Australia) Alex Bolt
February 24	Rwanda Challenger; Kigali, Rwanda; Clay – Challenger 75 – 32S/24Q/16D; Singles – Doubles	(France) Valentin Royer; 6–1, 6–2	(Slovakia) Andrej Martin	(Austria) Maximilian Neuchrist (Italy) Marco Cecchinato	(France) Mathys Erhard (Netherlands) Max Houkes (Romania) Filip Cristian Jianu (Austria) Lukas Neumayer
February 24	Rwanda Challenger; Kigali, Rwanda; Clay – Challenger 75 – 32S/24Q/16D; Singles – Doubles	(Netherlands) Jesper de Jong (Netherlands) Max Houkes; 6–3, 7–5	(France) Geoffrey Blancaneaux (Czech Republic) Zdeněk Kolář	(Austria) Maximilian Neuchrist (Italy) Marco Cecchinato	(France) Mathys Erhard (Netherlands) Max Houkes (Romania) Filip Cristian Jianu (Austria) Lukas Neumayer
February 24	Challenger Città di Lugano; Lugano, Switzerland; Hard (i) – Challenger 75 – 32S/24Q/16D; Singles – Doubles	(Croatia) Borna Ćorić; 6–3, 6–1	(Belgium) Raphaël Collignon	(United States) Murphy Cassone (Croatia) Dino Prižmić	(Canada) Liam Draxl (France) Luca Van Assche (Lithuania) Vilius Gaubas (Germany) Henri Squire
February 24	Challenger Città di Lugano; Lugano, Switzerland; Hard (i) – Challenger 75 – 32S/24Q/16D; Singles – Doubles	(Canada) Cleeve Harper (United Kingdom) David Stevenson; 4–6, 6–3, [10–8]	(Switzerland) Jakub Paul (Netherlands) David Pel	(United States) Murphy Cassone (Croatia) Dino Prižmić	(Canada) Liam Draxl (France) Luca Van Assche (Lithuania) Vilius Gaubas (Germany) Henri Squire

=== March ===
Week of	Tournament	Champions	Runners-up	Semifinalists	Quarterfinalists
March 3	Rwanda Challenger II; Kigali, Rwanda; Clay – Challenger 100 – 32S/24Q/16D; Singles – Doubles	(France) Valentin Royer; 6–2, 6–4	(Netherlands) Guy den Ouden	(Netherlands) Max Houkes (France) Luka Pavlovic	(France) Clément Tabur (Italy) Gabriele Pennaforti (Italy) Marco Cecchinato (France) Calvin Hemery
March 3	Rwanda Challenger II; Kigali, Rwanda; Clay – Challenger 100 – 32S/24Q/16D; Singles – Doubles	(India) Siddhant Banthia (Bulgaria) Alexander Donski; 6–4, 5–7, [10–8]	(France) Geoffrey Blancaneaux (Czech Republic) Zdeněk Kolář	(Netherlands) Max Houkes (France) Luka Pavlovic	(France) Clément Tabur (Italy) Gabriele Pennaforti (Italy) Marco Cecchinato (France) Calvin Hemery
March 3	Challenger Córdoba; Córdoba, Argentina; Clay – Challenger 75 – 32S/24Q/16D; Singles – Doubles	(Argentina) Thiago Agustín Tirante; 6–4, 6–0	(Argentina) Juan Pablo Ficovich	(Argentina) Federico Coria (Argentina) Juan Manuel Cerúndolo	(Brazil) Thiago Monteiro (Colombia) Daniel Elahi Galán (Argentina) Gonzalo Villanueva (Peru) Juan Pablo Varillas
March 3	Challenger Córdoba; Córdoba, Argentina; Clay – Challenger 75 – 32S/24Q/16D; Singles – Doubles	(Poland) Karol Drzewiecki (Poland) Piotr Matuszewski; 6–4, 6–4	(Brazil) Fernando Romboli (Chile) Matías Soto	(Argentina) Federico Coria (Argentina) Juan Manuel Cerúndolo	(Brazil) Thiago Monteiro (Colombia) Daniel Elahi Galán (Argentina) Gonzalo Villanueva (Peru) Juan Pablo Varillas
March 3	Thionville Open; Thionville, France; Hard (i) – Challenger 75 – 32S/24Q/16D; Singles – Doubles	(Croatia) Borna Ćorić; 6–4, 6–4	(France) Arthur Bouquier	Alibek Kachmazov (Austria) Jurij Rodionov	(Tunisia) Aziz Dougaz (Canada) Liam Draxl (France) Luca Van Assche (United Kingdom) Jan Choinski
March 3	Thionville Open; Thionville, France; Hard (i) – Challenger 75 – 32S/24Q/16D; Singles – Doubles	(Switzerland) Jakub Paul (Netherlands) David Pel; 6–1, 6–4	(France) Matteo Martineau (France) Luca Sanchez	Alibek Kachmazov (Austria) Jurij Rodionov	(Tunisia) Aziz Dougaz (Canada) Liam Draxl (France) Luca Van Assche (United Kingdom) Jan Choinski
March 3	Crete Challenger; Hersonissos, Greece; Hard – Challenger 50 – 32S/24Q/16D; Singles – Doubles	(Lithuania) Edas Butvilas; 6–3, 6–3	(United Kingdom) Stuart Parker	(Hungary) Zsombor Piros (United Kingdom) Ryan Peniston	(Austria) Dennis Novak (United Kingdom) Henry Searle (Bulgaria) Dimitar Kuzmanov; Aslan Karatsev
March 3	Crete Challenger; Hersonissos, Greece; Hard – Challenger 50 – 32S/24Q/16D; Singles – Doubles	(Bolivia) Juan Carlos Prado Ángelo (United Kingdom) Mark Whitehouse; 7–6^{(9–7)}, 6–2	(Austria) Dennis Novak (Hungary) Zsombor Piros	(Hungary) Zsombor Piros (United Kingdom) Ryan Peniston	(Austria) Dennis Novak (United Kingdom) Henry Searle (Bulgaria) Dimitar Kuzmanov; Aslan Karatsev
March 10	Arizona Tennis Classic; Phoenix, United States; Hard – Challenger 175 – 28S/16Q/16D; Singles – Doubles	(Brazil) João Fonseca; 7–6^{(7–5)}, 7–6^{(7–0)}	(Kazakhstan) Alexander Bublik	(Portugal) Nuno Borges (Japan) Kei Nishikori	(United States) Colton Smith (France) Corentin Moutet (France) Hugo Gaston (Italy) Flavio Cobolli
March 10	Arizona Tennis Classic; Phoenix, United States; Hard – Challenger 175 – 28S/16Q/16D; Singles – Doubles	(Spain) Marcel Granollers (Argentina) Horacio Zeballos; 6–3, 7–6^{(7–2)}	(United States) Austin Krajicek (United States) Rajeev Ram	(Portugal) Nuno Borges (Japan) Kei Nishikori	(United States) Colton Smith (France) Corentin Moutet (France) Hugo Gaston (Italy) Flavio Cobolli
March 10	Copa Cap Cana; Punta Cana, Dominican Republic; Hard – Challenger 175 – 28S/16Q/16D; Singles – Doubles	(United States) Aleksandar Kovacevic; 6–2, 6–3	(Bosnia and Herzegovina) Damir Džumhur	(France) Alexandre Müller (Czech Republic) Jakub Menšík	(France) Constant Lestienne (Germany) Daniel Altmaier (Serbia) Miomir Kecmanović (Argentina) Tomás Martín Etcheverry
March 10	Copa Cap Cana; Punta Cana, Dominican Republic; Hard – Challenger 175 – 28S/16Q/16D; Singles – Doubles	(Ecuador) Gonzalo Escobar (Ecuador) Diego Hidalgo; 7–6^{(7–5)}, 6–4	(Czech Republic) Petr Nouza (Czech Republic) Patrik Rikl	(France) Alexandre Müller (Czech Republic) Jakub Menšík	(France) Constant Lestienne (Germany) Daniel Altmaier (Serbia) Miomir Kecmanović (Argentina) Tomás Martín Etcheverry
March 10	Challenger La Manche; Cherbourg, France; Hard (i) – Challenger 75 – 32S/24Q/16D; Singles – Doubles	(France) Pierre-Hugues Herbert; 6–3, 6–4	(Netherlands) Jelle Sels	(Austria) Jurij Rodionov (Germany) Patrick Zahraj	(Finland) Emil Ruusuvuori (France) Matteo Martineau (Japan) Yuta Shimizu (United Kingdom) Arthur Fery
March 10	Challenger La Manche; Cherbourg, France; Hard (i) – Challenger 75 – 32S/24Q/16D; Singles – Doubles	(Ukraine) Oleg Prihodko (Ukraine) Vitaliy Sachko; 6–2, 6–2	(Slovakia) Lukáš Pokorný (Italy) Giorgio Ricca	(Austria) Jurij Rodionov (Germany) Patrick Zahraj	(Finland) Emil Ruusuvuori (France) Matteo Martineau (Japan) Yuta Shimizu (United Kingdom) Arthur Fery
March 10	Challenger de Santiago; Santiago, Chile; Clay – Challenger 75 – 32S/24Q/16D; Singles – Doubles	(Colombia) Daniel Elahi Galán; 7–5, 6–3	(Brazil) Thiago Monteiro	(Peru) Ignacio Buse (United States) Emilio Nava	(Argentina) Genaro Alberto Olivieri (Brazil) João Lucas Reis da Silva (Argentina) Andrea Collarini (Brazil) Matheus Pucinelli de Almeida
March 10	Challenger de Santiago; Santiago, Chile; Clay – Challenger 75 – 32S/24Q/16D; Singles – Doubles	(United States) Vasil Kirkov (Chile) Matías Soto; 6–4, 6–3	(Brazil) Mateus Alves (Brazil) Luís Britto	(Peru) Ignacio Buse (United States) Emilio Nava	(Argentina) Genaro Alberto Olivieri (Brazil) João Lucas Reis da Silva (Argentina) Andrea Collarini (Brazil) Matheus Pucinelli de Almeida
March 10	Crete Challenger II; Hersonissos, Greece; Hard – Challenger 50 – 32S/24Q/16D; Singles – Doubles	(Bulgaria) Dimitar Kuzmanov; 6–4, 6–2	(Italy) Federico Cinà	(Germany) Christoph Negritu; Aslan Karatsev	(Kazakhstan) Timofey Skatov (Austria) Dennis Novak (Turkey) Ergi Kırkın (Luxembourg) Chris Rodesch
March 10	Crete Challenger II; Hersonissos, Greece; Hard – Challenger 50 – 32S/24Q/16D; Singles – Doubles	(Greece) Stefanos Sakellaridis (Greece) Petros Tsitsipas; 6–2, 6–2	Ilia Simakin (Canada) Kelsey Stevenson	(Germany) Christoph Negritu; Aslan Karatsev	(Kazakhstan) Timofey Skatov (Austria) Dennis Novak (Turkey) Ergi Kırkın (Luxembourg) Chris Rodesch
March 17	Paraguay Open; Asunción, Paraguay; Clay – Challenger 75 – 32S/24Q/16D; Singles – Doubles	(United States) Emilio Nava; 7–5, 6–3	(Brazil) Thiago Monteiro	(Brazil) Matheus Pucinelli de Almeida (Paraguay) Daniel Vallejo	(Ecuador) Álvaro Guillén Meza (Argentina) Román Andrés Burruchaga (Chile) Tomás Barrios Vera (Colombia) Daniel Elahi Galán
March 17	Paraguay Open; Asunción, Paraguay; Clay – Challenger 75 – 32S/24Q/16D; Singles – Doubles	(United States) Vasil Kirkov (Chile) Matías Soto; 6–3, 6–4	(Argentina) Guillermo Durán (Argentina) Mariano Kestelboim	(Brazil) Matheus Pucinelli de Almeida (Paraguay) Daniel Vallejo	(Ecuador) Álvaro Guillén Meza (Argentina) Román Andrés Burruchaga (Chile) Tomás Barrios Vera (Colombia) Daniel Elahi Galán
March 17	Yucatán Open; Mérida, Mexico; Clay – Challenger 75 – 32S/24Q/16D; Singles – Doubles	(Brazil) Felipe Meligeni Alves; 6–2, 1–6, 6–2	(Argentina) Juan Pablo Ficovich	(Bolivia) Hugo Dellien (Chile) Cristian Garín	(Argentina) Renzo Olivo (United States) Garrett Johns (Bolivia) Juan Carlos Prado Ángelo (Mexico) Rodrigo Pacheco Méndez
March 17	Yucatán Open; Mérida, Mexico; Clay – Challenger 75 – 32S/24Q/16D; Singles – Doubles	(Switzerland) Kilian Feldbausch (Mexico) Rodrigo Pacheco Méndez; 6–4, 6–2	(United States) George Goldhoff (United States) Trey Hilderbrand	(Bolivia) Hugo Dellien (Chile) Cristian Garín	(Argentina) Renzo Olivo (United States) Garrett Johns (Bolivia) Juan Carlos Prado Ángelo (Mexico) Rodrigo Pacheco Méndez
March 17	Murcia Open; Murcia, Spain; Clay – Challenger 75 – 32S/24Q/16D; Singles – Doubles	(Spain) Carlos Taberner; 7–6^{(7–3)}, 4–6, 6–2	(Netherlands) Jesper de Jong	(Belgium) Kimmer Coppejans; Ivan Gakhov	(Hungary) Márton Fucsovics (Spain) Pablo Llamas Ruiz (Kazakhstan) Denis Yevseyev (France) Harold Mayot
March 17	Murcia Open; Murcia, Spain; Clay – Challenger 75 – 32S/24Q/16D; Singles – Doubles	(France) Grégoire Jacq (Brazil) Orlando Luz; 6–4, 6–4	(Netherlands) Jesper de Jong (Netherlands) Mats Hermans	(Belgium) Kimmer Coppejans; Ivan Gakhov	(Hungary) Márton Fucsovics (Spain) Pablo Llamas Ruiz (Kazakhstan) Denis Yevseyev (France) Harold Mayot
March 17	Zadar Open; Zadar, Croatia; Clay – Challenger 75 – 32S/24Q/16D; Singles – Doubles	(Croatia) Borna Ćorić; 3–6, 6–2, 6–3	(France) Valentin Royer	(Bosnia and Herzegovina) Damir Džumhur (Italy) Enrico Dalla Valle	(Croatia) Mili Poljičak (Romania) Filip Cristian Jianu (Slovakia) Jozef Kovalík (Bosnia and Herzegovina) Nerman Fatić
March 17	Zadar Open; Zadar, Croatia; Clay – Challenger 75 – 32S/24Q/16D; Singles – Doubles	(Czech Republic) Zdeněk Kolář (Austria) Neil Oberleitner; 6–3, 6–4	(Ukraine) Denys Molchanov (Netherlands) Mick Veldheer	(Bosnia and Herzegovina) Damir Džumhur (Italy) Enrico Dalla Valle	(Croatia) Mili Poljičak (Romania) Filip Cristian Jianu (Slovakia) Jozef Kovalík (Bosnia and Herzegovina) Nerman Fatić
March 24	Napoli Tennis Cup; Naples, Italy; Clay – Challenger 125 – 32S/24Q/16D; Singles – Doubles	(Czech Republic) Vít Kopřiva; 3–6, 6–3, 7–6^{(7–4)}	(Italy) Luciano Darderi	(Czech Republic) Dalibor Svrčina (Italy) Andrea Pellegrino	(Switzerland) Stan Wawrinka (Bolivia) Murkel Dellien (France) Pierre-Hugues Herbert (Italy) Federico Arnaboldi
March 24	Napoli Tennis Cup; Naples, Italy; Clay – Challenger 125 – 32S/24Q/16D; Singles – Doubles	(Austria) Alexander Erler (Germany) Constantin Frantzen; 6–4, 6–4	(France) Geoffrey Blancaneaux (France) Albano Olivetti	(Czech Republic) Dalibor Svrčina (Italy) Andrea Pellegrino	(Switzerland) Stan Wawrinka (Bolivia) Murkel Dellien (France) Pierre-Hugues Herbert (Italy) Federico Arnaboldi
March 24	Morelia Open; Morelia, Mexico; Hard – Challenger 125 – 32S/24Q/16D; Singles – Doubles	(Kazakhstan) Dmitry Popko; 1–6, 6–2, 6–4	(Australia) James Duckworth	(Kazakhstan) Beibit Zhukayev (France) Hugo Grenier	(Mexico) Alex Hernández (Switzerland) Marc-Andrea Hüsler (Argentina) Thiago Agustín Tirante (Australia) Bernard Tomic
March 24	Morelia Open; Morelia, Mexico; Hard – Challenger 125 – 32S/24Q/16D; Singles – Doubles	(Ecuador) Gonzalo Escobar (Ecuador) Diego Hidalgo; 6–4, 4–6, [10–3]	(Switzerland) Marc-Andrea Hüsler (Italy) Stefano Napolitano	(Kazakhstan) Beibit Zhukayev (France) Hugo Grenier	(Mexico) Alex Hernández (Switzerland) Marc-Andrea Hüsler (Argentina) Thiago Agustín Tirante (Australia) Bernard Tomic
March 24	Girona Challenger; Girona, Spain; Clay – Challenger 100 – 32S/24Q/16D; Singles – Doubles	(Croatia) Marin Čilić; 6–3, 6–4	(Denmark) Elmer Møller	(Netherlands) Jesper de Jong (Serbia) Dušan Lajović	(Spain) Pablo Carreño Busta (Austria) Sebastian Ofner (Kazakhstan) Timofey Skatov (Lebanon) Benjamin Hassan
March 24	Girona Challenger; Girona, Spain; Clay – Challenger 100 – 32S/24Q/16D; Singles – Doubles	(India) Anirudh Chandrasekar (Spain) David Vega Hernández; 6–4, 6–4	(France) Grégoire Jacq (Brazil) Orlando Luz	(Netherlands) Jesper de Jong (Serbia) Dušan Lajović	(Spain) Pablo Carreño Busta (Austria) Sebastian Ofner (Kazakhstan) Timofey Skatov (Lebanon) Benjamin Hassan
March 24	Challenger Concepción; Concepción, Chile; Clay – Challenger 75 – 32S/24Q/16D; Singles – Doubles	(United States) Emilio Nava; 6–1, 7–6^{(7–3)}	(Argentina) Nicolás Kicker	(Chile) Matías Soto (Argentina) Genaro Alberto Olivieri	(Argentina) Guido Iván Justo (Argentina) Román Andrés Burruchaga (Brazil) João Lucas Reis da Silva (Colombia) Daniel Elahi Galán
March 24	Challenger Concepción; Concepción, Chile; Clay – Challenger 75 – 32S/24Q/16D; Singles – Doubles	(United States) Vasil Kirkov (Chile) Matías Soto; 6–2, 6–4	(Japan) Seita Watanabe (Japan) Takeru Yuzuki	(Chile) Matías Soto (Argentina) Genaro Alberto Olivieri	(Argentina) Guido Iván Justo (Argentina) Román Andrés Burruchaga (Brazil) João Lucas Reis da Silva (Colombia) Daniel Elahi Galán
March 31	Open Menorca; Menorca, Spain; Clay – Challenger 100 – 32S/24Q/16D; Singles – Doubles	(Lithuania) Vilius Gaubas; 6–0, 6–4	(Spain) Pol Martín Tiffon	(Austria) Lukas Neumayer (Peru) Ignacio Buse	(Spain) Carlos Taberner (Denmark) Elmer Møller (Hungary) Zsombor Piros (Austria) Sebastian Ofner
March 31	Open Menorca; Menorca, Spain; Clay – Challenger 100 – 32S/24Q/16D; Singles – Doubles	(Lebanon) Benjamin Hassan (Austria) Sebastian Ofner; 7–5, 6–3	(Italy) Andrea Vavassori (Italy) Matteo Vavassori	(Austria) Lukas Neumayer (Peru) Ignacio Buse	(Spain) Carlos Taberner (Denmark) Elmer Møller (Hungary) Zsombor Piros (Austria) Sebastian Ofner
March 31	Open Città della Disfida; Barletta, Italy; Clay – Challenger 75 – 32S/24Q/16D; Singles – Doubles	(Czech Republic) Dalibor Svrčina; 7–5, 6–3	(Ukraine) Vitaliy Sachko	(France) Valentin Royer (Czech Republic) Maxim Mrva	(Italy) Enrico Dalla Valle (Belgium) Michael Geerts (United Kingdom) Dan Evans (Croatia) Matej Dodig
March 31	Open Città della Disfida; Barletta, Italy; Clay – Challenger 75 – 32S/24Q/16D; Singles – Doubles	(Peru) Alexander Merino (Germany) Christoph Negritu; 7–6^{(7–5)}, 6–2	(Netherlands) Mats Hermans (Portugal) Tiago Pereira	(France) Valentin Royer (Czech Republic) Maxim Mrva	(Italy) Enrico Dalla Valle (Belgium) Michael Geerts (United Kingdom) Dan Evans (Croatia) Matej Dodig
March 31	Campeonato Internacional de Tênis de Campinas; Campinas, Brazil; Clay – Challenger 75 – 32S/24Q/16D; Singles – Doubles	(Chile) Tomás Barrios Vera; 6–4, 6–3	(Ecuador) Álvaro Guillén Meza	(Peru) Juan Pablo Varillas (Chile) Matías Soto	(Brazil) Eduardo Ribeiro (Peru) Gonzalo Bueno (Bolivia) Juan Carlos Prado Ángelo (Brazil) Daniel Dutra da Silva
March 31	Campeonato Internacional de Tênis de Campinas; Campinas, Brazil; Clay – Challenger 75 – 32S/24Q/16D; Singles – Doubles	(Argentina) Mariano Kestelboim (Argentina) Gonzalo Villanueva; 6–2, 7–6^{(7–5)}	(Japan) Seita Watanabe (Japan) Takeru Yuzuki	(Peru) Juan Pablo Varillas (Chile) Matías Soto	(Brazil) Eduardo Ribeiro (Peru) Gonzalo Bueno (Bolivia) Juan Carlos Prado Ángelo (Brazil) Daniel Dutra da Silva
March 31	Morelos Open; Cuernavaca, Mexico; Hard – Challenger 75 – 32S/24Q/16D; Singles – Doubles	(Switzerland) Marc-Andrea Hüsler; 6–4, 3–6, 6–4	(Kazakhstan) Dmitry Popko	(Spain) Rafael Jódar (Canada) Alexis Galarneau	(Mexico) Rodrigo Pacheco Méndez (United States) Aidan Mayo (Argentina) Juan Pablo Ficovich (France) Robin Catry
March 31	Morelos Open; Cuernavaca, Mexico; Hard – Challenger 75 – 32S/24Q/16D; Singles – Doubles	(Antigua and Barbuda) Jody Maginley (United States) Alfredo Perez; 7–5, 6–7^{(5–7)}, [10–8]	(New Zealand) Finn Reynolds (New Zealand) James Watt	(Spain) Rafael Jódar (Canada) Alexis Galarneau	(Mexico) Rodrigo Pacheco Méndez (United States) Aidan Mayo (Argentina) Juan Pablo Ficovich (France) Robin Catry

=== April ===
Week of	Tournament	Champions	Runners-up	Semifinalists	Quarterfinalists
April 7	Mexico City Open; Mexico City, Mexico; Clay – Challenger 125 – 32S/24Q/16D; Singles – Doubles	(Brazil) Felipe Meligeni Alves; 6–3, 6–3	(France) Luka Pavlovic	(France) Adrian Mannarino (Switzerland) Marc-Andrea Hüsler	(Peru) Juan Pablo Varillas (Australia) Bernard Tomic (United States) Alfredo Perez (Tunisia) Aziz Dougaz
April 7	Mexico City Open; Mexico City, Mexico; Clay – Challenger 125 – 32S/24Q/16D; Singles – Doubles	(Mexico) Santiago González (United States) Austin Krajicek; 7–6^{(11–9)}, 3–6, [10–5]	(United States) Ryan Seggerman (United States) Patrik Trhac	(France) Adrian Mannarino (Switzerland) Marc-Andrea Hüsler	(Peru) Juan Pablo Varillas (Australia) Bernard Tomic (United States) Alfredo Perez (Tunisia) Aziz Dougaz
April 7	Open Comunidad de Madrid; Madrid, Spain; Clay – Challenger 100 – 32S/24Q/16D; Singles – Doubles	(Poland) Kamil Majchrzak; 6–3, 4–6, 6–4	(Croatia) Marin Čilić	(France) Valentin Royer (Slovakia) Norbert Gombos	(Hungary) Zsombor Piros (Lithuania) Vilius Gaubas; Pavel Kotov (Spain) Pablo Carreño Busta
April 7	Open Comunidad de Madrid; Madrid, Spain; Clay – Challenger 100 – 32S/24Q/16D; Singles – Doubles	(Portugal) Francisco Cabral (Austria) Lucas Miedler; 7–6^{(7–2)}, 6–4	(Switzerland) Jakub Paul (Netherlands) David Pel	(France) Valentin Royer (Slovakia) Norbert Gombos	(Hungary) Zsombor Piros (Lithuania) Vilius Gaubas; Pavel Kotov (Spain) Pablo Carreño Busta
April 7	Monza Open; Monza, Italy; Clay – Challenger 100 – 32S/24Q/16D; Singles – Doubles	(Belgium) Raphaël Collignon; 6–3, 7–5	(Ukraine) Vitaliy Sachko	(Czech Republic) Dalibor Svrčina (France) Luca Van Assche	(United Kingdom) Jan Choinski (Austria) Filip Misolic (Italy) Federico Arnaboldi (Italy) Jacopo Vasamì
April 7	Monza Open; Monza, Italy; Clay – Challenger 100 – 32S/24Q/16D; Singles – Doubles	(Netherlands) Sander Arends (United Kingdom) Luke Johnson; 6–1, 6–1	(Italy) Filippo Romano (Italy) Jacopo Vasamì	(Czech Republic) Dalibor Svrčina (France) Luca Van Assche	(United Kingdom) Jan Choinski (Austria) Filip Misolic (Italy) Federico Arnaboldi (Italy) Jacopo Vasamì
April 7	Sarasota Open; Sarasota, United States; Clay – Challenger 75 – 32S/24Q/16D; Singles – Doubles	(United States) Emilio Nava; 6–2, 7–6^{(7–2)}	(Canada) Liam Draxl	(United States) Eliot Spizzirri (Argentina) Federico Agustín Gómez	(France) Geoffrey Blancaneaux (Chile) Tomás Barrios Vera (Ecuador) Andrés Andrade (Romania) Filip Cristian Jianu
April 7	Sarasota Open; Sarasota, United States; Clay – Challenger 75 – 32S/24Q/16D; Singles – Doubles	(United States) Robert Cash (United States) JJ Tracy; 6–4, 7–6^{(7–3)}	(Argentina) Federico Agustín Gómez (Venezuela) Luis David Martínez	(United States) Eliot Spizzirri (Argentina) Federico Agustín Gómez	(France) Geoffrey Blancaneaux (Chile) Tomás Barrios Vera (Ecuador) Andrés Andrade (Romania) Filip Cristian Jianu
April 14	Busan Open; Busan, South Korea; Hard – Challenger 125 – 32S/24Q/16D; Singles – Doubles	(France) Térence Atmane; 6–3, 6–4	(Australia) Adam Walton	(Australia) Jason Kubler (United States) Brandon Holt	(Japan) Yasutaka Uchiyama (South Korea) Chung Hyeon (Chinese Taipei) Hsu Yu-hsiou; Ilia Simakin
April 14	Busan Open; Busan, South Korea; Hard – Challenger 125 – 32S/24Q/16D; Singles – Doubles	(Japan) Rio Noguchi (Japan) Yuta Shimizu; 7–6^{(9–7)}, 6–4	(Chinese Taipei) Ray Ho (Australia) Matthew Romios	(Australia) Jason Kubler (United States) Brandon Holt	(Japan) Yasutaka Uchiyama (South Korea) Chung Hyeon (Chinese Taipei) Hsu Yu-hsiou; Ilia Simakin
April 14	Open de Oeiras; Oeiras, Portugal; Clay – Challenger 125 – 32S/24Q/16D; Singles – Doubles	(Denmark) Elmer Møller; 6–0, 6–4	(Argentina) Francisco Comesaña	(Spain) Carlos Taberner; Roman Safiullin	(France) Grégoire Barrère (Belgium) Raphaël Collignon (Switzerland) Rémy Bertola (Serbia) Dušan Lajović
April 14	Open de Oeiras; Oeiras, Portugal; Clay – Challenger 125 – 32S/24Q/16D; Singles – Doubles	(Poland) Karol Drzewiecki (Poland) Piotr Matuszewski; 6–4, 3–6, [10–8]	(Portugal) Francisco Cabral (Austria) Lucas Miedler	(Spain) Carlos Taberner; Roman Safiullin	(France) Grégoire Barrère (Belgium) Raphaël Collignon (Switzerland) Rémy Bertola (Serbia) Dušan Lajović
April 14	San Luis Tennis Open; San Luis Potosí, Mexico; Clay – Challenger 75 – 32S/24Q/16D; Singles – Doubles	(Australia) James Duckworth; 6–1, 6–1	(Germany) Max Wiskandt	(Canada) Dan Martin (Argentina) Juan Pablo Ficovich	(United States) Alfredo Perez (Brazil) Mateus Alves (Colombia) Miguel Tobón (Argentina) Santiago Rodríguez Taverna
April 14	San Luis Tennis Open; San Luis Potosí, Mexico; Clay – Challenger 75 – 32S/24Q/16D; Singles – Doubles	Ivan Liutarevich (United Kingdom) Marcus Willis; 6–3, 6–4	(United States) Trey Hilderbrand (United States) Alfredo Perez	(Canada) Dan Martin (Argentina) Juan Pablo Ficovich	(United States) Alfredo Perez (Brazil) Mateus Alves (Colombia) Miguel Tobón (Argentina) Santiago Rodríguez Taverna
April 14	Tallahassee Tennis Challenger; Tallahassee, United States; Clay – Challenger 75 – 32S/24Q/16D; Singles – Doubles	(Luxembourg) Chris Rodesch; 4–6, 6–3, 6–4	(United States) Emilio Nava	(France) Mathys Erhard (Argentina) Andrea Collarini	(United States) Murphy Cassone (United States) Mitchell Krueger (Brazil) João Lucas Reis da Silva (Ecuador) Andrés Andrade
April 14	Tallahassee Tennis Challenger; Tallahassee, United States; Clay – Challenger 75 – 32S/24Q/16D; Singles – Doubles	(Canada) Liam Draxl (Canada) Cleeve Harper; 6–2, 6–3	(United States) James Cerretani (United States) George Goldhoff	(France) Mathys Erhard (Argentina) Andrea Collarini	(United States) Murphy Cassone (United States) Mitchell Krueger (Brazil) João Lucas Reis da Silva (Ecuador) Andrés Andrade
April 14	Côte d'Ivoire Open; Abidjan, Ivory Coast; Hard – Challenger 50 – 32S/24Q/16D; Singles – Doubles	(Thailand) Maximus Jones; 6–3, 4–6, 6–4	(Lithuania) Ričardas Berankis	(France) Florent Bax (Belgium) Tibo Colson	(United Kingdom) Giles Hussey (Estonia) Daniil Glinka (Belgium) Michael Geerts (France) Robin Bertrand
April 14	Côte d'Ivoire Open; Abidjan, Ivory Coast; Hard – Challenger 50 – 32S/24Q/16D; Singles – Doubles	(Australia) Matt Hulme (Netherlands) Thijmen Loof; 7–6^{(7–3)}, 6–4	(France) Clément Chidekh (Antigua and Barbuda) Jody Maginley	(France) Florent Bax (Belgium) Tibo Colson	(United Kingdom) Giles Hussey (Estonia) Daniil Glinka (Belgium) Michael Geerts (France) Robin Bertrand
April 21	Gwangju Open; Gwangju, South Korea; Hard – Challenger 75 – 32S/24Q/16D; Singles – Doubles	(Australia) Jason Kubler; 7–5, 6–7^{(7–9)}, 6–3	Alibek Kachmazov	(Australia) Tristan Schoolkate (Japan) Yosuke Watanuki	(France) Hugo Grenier (South Korea) Chung Hyeon (United States) Brandon Holt (Australia) Omar Jasika
April 21	Gwangju Open; Gwangju, South Korea; Hard – Challenger 75 – 32S/24Q/16D; Singles – Doubles	(Chinese Taipei) Ray Ho (Australia) Matthew Romios; 6–3, 7–6^{(8–6)}	(United States) Vasil Kirkov (Netherlands) Bart Stevens	(Australia) Tristan Schoolkate (Japan) Yosuke Watanuki	(France) Hugo Grenier (South Korea) Chung Hyeon (United States) Brandon Holt (Australia) Omar Jasika
April 21	Savannah Challenger; Savannah, United States; Clay – Challenger 75 – 32S/24Q/16D; Singles – Doubles	(Colombia) Nicolás Mejía; 2–6, 6–2, 7–6^{(7–3)}	(Canada) Liam Draxl	(United States) Eliot Spizzirri (Argentina) Genaro Alberto Olivieri	(United States) Stefan Kozlov (Chinese Taipei) Wu Tung-lin (United Kingdom) Oliver Crawford (United States) Andres Martin
April 21	Savannah Challenger; Savannah, United States; Clay – Challenger 75 – 32S/24Q/16D; Singles – Doubles	(Argentina) Federico Agustín Gómez (Venezuela) Luis David Martínez; 3–6, 6–3, [10–5]	(United States) Mac Kiger (United States) Patrick Maloney	(United States) Eliot Spizzirri (Argentina) Genaro Alberto Olivieri	(United States) Stefan Kozlov (Chinese Taipei) Wu Tung-lin (United Kingdom) Oliver Crawford (United States) Andres Martin
April 21	Côte d'Ivoire Open II; Abidjan, Ivory Coast; Hard – Challenger 50 – 32S/24Q/16D; Singles – Doubles	(Ivory Coast) Eliakim Coulibaly; 6–7^{(3–7)}, 6–4, 6–4	(Tunisia) Aziz Dougaz	(Belgium) Michael Geerts (Lithuania) Ričardas Berankis	(South Africa) Philip Henning (India) Aryan Shah (France) Clément Chidekh (Georgia (country)) Aleksandre Bakshi
April 21	Côte d'Ivoire Open II; Abidjan, Ivory Coast; Hard – Challenger 50 – 32S/24Q/16D; Singles – Doubles	(France) Constantin Bittoun Kouzmine (Tunisia) Aziz Ouakaa; 7–6^{(7–5)}, 7–5	(Georgia (country)) Aleksandre Bakshi (India) S D Prajwal Dev	(Belgium) Michael Geerts (Lithuania) Ričardas Berankis	(South Africa) Philip Henning (India) Aryan Shah (France) Clément Chidekh (Georgia (country)) Aleksandre Bakshi
April 21	Garden Open; Rome, Italy; Clay – Challenger 50 – 32S/24Q/16D; Singles – Doubles	(Italy) Matteo Gigante; 6–2, 3–6, 6–4	(Lithuania) Vilius Gaubas	(Austria) Lukas Neumayer (Austria) Sandro Kopp	(Italy) Andrea Pellegrino (Kazakhstan) Timofey Skatov (Italy) Federico Arnaboldi (Italy) Francesco Maestrelli
April 21	Garden Open; Rome, Italy; Clay – Challenger 50 – 32S/24Q/16D; Singles – Doubles	(Sweden) Erik Grevelius (Sweden) Adam Heinonen; 7–6^{(7–2)}, 7–5	(Italy) Marco Bortolotti (Italy) Giorgio Ricca	(Austria) Lukas Neumayer (Austria) Sandro Kopp	(Italy) Andrea Pellegrino (Kazakhstan) Timofey Skatov (Italy) Federico Arnaboldi (Italy) Francesco Maestrelli
April 21	Challenger Tucumán; San Miguel de Tucumán, Argentina; Clay – Challenger 50 – 32S/24Q/16D; Singles – Doubles	(Argentina) Alex Barrena; 7–5, 6–2	(Argentina) Santiago Rodríguez Taverna	(Argentina) Andrea Collarini (Bolivia) Murkel Dellien	(Argentina) Facundo Bagnis (Argentina) Juan Bautista Torres (Brazil) Pedro Boscardin Dias (Argentina) Mariano Kestelboim
April 21	Challenger Tucumán; San Miguel de Tucumán, Argentina; Clay – Challenger 50 – 32S/24Q/16D; Singles – Doubles	(Peru) Conner Huertas del Pino (Bolivia) Federico Zeballos; 1–6, 6–2, [10–8]	(Argentina) Luciano Emanuel Ambrogi (Argentina) Máximo Zeitune	(Argentina) Andrea Collarini (Bolivia) Murkel Dellien	(Argentina) Facundo Bagnis (Argentina) Juan Bautista Torres (Brazil) Pedro Boscardin Dias (Argentina) Mariano Kestelboim
April 28	Open Aix Provence; Aix-en-Provence, France; Clay – Challenger 175 – 28S/16Q/16D; Singles – Doubles	(Croatia) Borna Ćorić; 6–7^{(5–7)}, 6–3, 7–6^{(7–4)}	(Switzerland) Stan Wawrinka	(Croatia) Borna Gojo (Peru) Ignacio Buse	(United States) Nishesh Basavareddy (Monaco) Valentin Vacherot (Argentina) Mariano Navone (United States) Reilly Opelka
April 28	Open Aix Provence; Aix-en-Provence, France; Clay – Challenger 175 – 28S/16Q/16D; Singles – Doubles	(United States) Robert Cash (United States) JJ Tracy; 7–5, 7–6^{(7–5)}	(France) Théo Arribagé (Monaco) Hugo Nys	(Croatia) Borna Gojo (Peru) Ignacio Buse	(United States) Nishesh Basavareddy (Monaco) Valentin Vacherot (Argentina) Mariano Navone (United States) Reilly Opelka
April 28	Estoril Open; Estoril, Portugal; Clay – Challenger 175 – 28S/16Q/16D; Singles – Doubles	(United States) Alex Michelsen; 6–4, 6–4	(Italy) Andrea Pellegrino	(Australia) Aleksandar Vukic (Serbia) Miomir Kecmanović	(Chile) Nicolás Jarry (Spain) Bernabé Zapata Miralles (Portugal) Nuno Borges (Italy) Luca Nardi
April 28	Estoril Open; Estoril, Portugal; Clay – Challenger 175 – 28S/16Q/16D; Singles – Doubles	(Uruguay) Ariel Behar (Belgium) Joran Vliegen; 7–5, 6–3	(Portugal) Francisco Cabral (Austria) Lucas Miedler	(Australia) Aleksandar Vukic (Serbia) Miomir Kecmanović	(Chile) Nicolás Jarry (Spain) Bernabé Zapata Miralles (Portugal) Nuno Borges (Italy) Luca Nardi
April 28	Upper Austria Open; Mauthausen, Austria; Clay – Challenger 100 – 32S/24Q/16D; Singles – Doubles	(Chile) Cristian Garín; 3–6, 6–1, 6–4	(Chile) Tomás Barrios Vera	(Switzerland) Jérôme Kym (Argentina) Román Andrés Burruchaga	(Belgium) Alexander Blockx (Argentina) Marco Trungelliti (Austria) Neil Oberleitner (Argentina) Thiago Agustín Tirante
April 28	Upper Austria Open; Mauthausen, Austria; Clay – Challenger 100 – 32S/24Q/16D; Singles – Doubles	(Austria) Nico Hipfl (Switzerland) Jérôme Kym; 7–5, 3–6, [10–2]	(United States) Ryan Seggerman (United Kingdom) David Stevenson	(Switzerland) Jérôme Kym (Argentina) Román Andrés Burruchaga	(Belgium) Alexander Blockx (Argentina) Marco Trungelliti (Austria) Neil Oberleitner (Argentina) Thiago Agustín Tirante
April 28	Guangzhou International Challenger; Nansha, China; Hard – Challenger 75 – 32S/24Q/16D; Singles – Doubles	(France) Térence Atmane; 6–3, 7–6^{(7–4)}	(Australia) Tristan Schoolkate	Alibek Kachmazov (United States) Brandon Holt	(Australia) James McCabe (France) Hugo Grenier; Ilia Simakin (Chinese Taipei) Hsu Yu-hsiou
April 28	Guangzhou International Challenger; Nansha, China; Hard – Challenger 75 – 32S/24Q/16D; Singles – Doubles	(Chinese Taipei) Ray Ho (Australia) Matthew Romios; 6–3, 6–4	(United States) Vasil Kirkov (Netherlands) Bart Stevens	Alibek Kachmazov (United States) Brandon Holt	(Australia) James McCabe (France) Hugo Grenier; Ilia Simakin (Chinese Taipei) Hsu Yu-hsiou
April 28	Ostra Group Open; Ostrava, Czech Republic; Clay – Challenger 75 – 32S/24Q/16D; Singles – Doubles	(Hungary) Zsombor Piros; 6–3, 6–2	(Lebanon) Hady Habib	(Spain) Oriol Roca Batalla (Belgium) Gauthier Onclin	(Czech Republic) Vít Kopřiva (Germany) Henri Squire (Spain) Daniel Rincón (Czech Republic) Petr Brunclík
April 28	Ostra Group Open; Ostrava, Czech Republic; Clay – Challenger 75 – 32S/24Q/16D; Singles – Doubles	(Czech Republic) Jan Jermář (Serbia) Stefan Latinović; 7–5, 6–3	(New Zealand) Finn Reynolds (New Zealand) James Watt	(Spain) Oriol Roca Batalla (Belgium) Gauthier Onclin	(Czech Republic) Vít Kopřiva (Germany) Henri Squire (Spain) Daniel Rincón (Czech Republic) Petr Brunclík
April 28	Brasil Tennis Open; Porto Alegre, Brazil; Clay – Challenger 50 – 32S/24Q/16D; Singles – Doubles	(Argentina) Santiago Rodríguez Taverna; 4–6, 6–4, 7–6^{(8–6)}	(Spain) Nikolás Sánchez Izquierdo	(Brazil) Matheus Pucinelli de Almeida (Argentina) Alex Barrena	(Argentina) Lautaro Midón (Argentina) Guido Iván Justo (Brazil) Eduardo Ribeiro (Brazil) João Lucas Reis da Silva
April 28	Brasil Tennis Open; Porto Alegre, Brazil; Clay – Challenger 50 – 32S/24Q/16D; Singles – Doubles	(Bolivia) Juan Carlos Prado Ángelo (Bolivia) Federico Zeballos; 7–5, 7–5	(Argentina) Lautaro Midón (Argentina) Gonzalo Villanueva	(Brazil) Matheus Pucinelli de Almeida (Argentina) Alex Barrena	(Argentina) Lautaro Midón (Argentina) Guido Iván Justo (Brazil) Eduardo Ribeiro (Brazil) João Lucas Reis da Silva

=== May ===
Week of	Tournament	Champions	Runners-up	Semifinalists	Quarterfinalists
May 5	Wuxi Open; Wuxi, China; Hard – Challenger 100 – 32S/24Q/16D; Singles – Doubles	(China) Sun Fajing; 7–6^{(7–4)}, 6–4	(Australia) Alex Bolt	Ilia Simakin (France) Térence Atmane	(Japan) Yusuke Takahashi (United Kingdom) Ryan Peniston (Japan) Rio Noguchi (China) Cui Jie
May 5	Wuxi Open; Wuxi, China; Hard – Challenger 100 – 32S/24Q/16D; Singles – Doubles	(United States) Vasil Kirkov (Netherlands) Bart Stevens; 3–6, 7–5, [10–6]	(Chinese Taipei) Ray Ho (Australia) Matthew Romios	Ilia Simakin (France) Térence Atmane	(Japan) Yusuke Takahashi (United Kingdom) Ryan Peniston (Japan) Rio Noguchi (China) Cui Jie
May 5	Abruzzo Open; Francavilla al Mare, Italy; Clay – Challenger 75 – 32S/24Q/16D; Singles – Doubles	(Italy) Francesco Maestrelli; 6–4, 6–4	(Monaco) Valentin Vacherot	(Switzerland) Dominic Stricker (Estonia) Mark Lajal	(Belgium) Kimmer Coppejans (France) Benoît Paire (Sweden) Elias Ymer (Spain) Carlos Sánchez Jover
May 5	Abruzzo Open; Francavilla al Mare, Italy; Clay – Challenger 75 – 32S/24Q/16D; Singles – Doubles	(Venezuela) Luis David Martínez (Argentina) Facundo Mena; 7–5, 2–6, [10–6]	(France) Théo Arribagé (France) Grégoire Jacq	(Switzerland) Dominic Stricker (Estonia) Mark Lajal	(Belgium) Kimmer Coppejans (France) Benoît Paire (Sweden) Elias Ymer (Spain) Carlos Sánchez Jover
May 5	Advantage Cars Prague Open; Prague, Czech Republic; Clay – Challenger 75 – 32S/24Q/16D; Singles – Doubles	(Austria) Filip Misolic; 6–4, 6–0	(Netherlands) Guy den Ouden	(Slovakia) Lukáš Klein (Spain) Martín Landaluce	(France) Maxime Chazal (Netherlands) Mees Röttgering (Belgium) Alexander Blockx (Norway) Nicolai Budkov Kjær
May 5	Advantage Cars Prague Open; Prague, Czech Republic; Clay – Challenger 75 – 32S/24Q/16D; Singles – Doubles	(Ukraine) Denys Molchanov (Czech Republic) Matěj Vocel; 7–6^{(7–3)}, 6–3	(Austria) David Pichler (Austria) Jurij Rodionov	(Slovakia) Lukáš Klein (Spain) Martín Landaluce	(France) Maxime Chazal (Netherlands) Mees Röttgering (Belgium) Alexander Blockx (Norway) Nicolai Budkov Kjær
May 5	Santos Brasil Tennis Cup; Santos, Brazil; Clay – Challenger 50 – 32S/24Q/16D; Singles – Doubles	(Ecuador) Álvaro Guillén Meza; 6–3, 7–6^{(14–12)}	(Brazil) Matheus Pucinelli de Almeida	(Uruguay) Franco Roncadelli (Argentina) Nicolás Kicker	(Argentina) Renzo Olivo (Argentina) Gonzalo Villanueva (Argentina) Lautaro Midón (Italy) Gianluca Mager
May 5	Santos Brasil Tennis Cup; Santos, Brazil; Clay – Challenger 50 – 32S/24Q/16D; Singles – Doubles	(Brazil) Pedro Boscardin Dias (Argentina) Gonzalo Villanueva; 6–2, 6–7^{(3–7)}, [10–7]	(Bolivia) Boris Arias (Bolivia) Federico Zeballos	(Uruguay) Franco Roncadelli (Argentina) Nicolás Kicker	(Argentina) Renzo Olivo (Argentina) Gonzalo Villanueva (Argentina) Lautaro Midón (Italy) Gianluca Mager
May 12	BNP Paribas Primrose Bordeaux; Bordeaux, France; Clay – Challenger 175 – 28S/16Q/16D; Singles – Doubles	(France) Giovanni Mpetshi Perricard; 6–3, 6–7^{(5–7)}, 7–5	(Georgia (country)) Nikoloz Basilashvili	(Netherlands) Tallon Griekspoor (Australia) Rinky Hijikata	(United States) Brandon Nakashima (France) Térence Atmane (Kazakhstan) Alexander Shevchenko (Lebanon) Benjamin Hassan
May 12	BNP Paribas Primrose Bordeaux; Bordeaux, France; Clay – Challenger 175 – 28S/16Q/16D; Singles – Doubles	(Portugal) Francisco Cabral (Austria) Lucas Miedler; 7–6^{(7–1)}, 7–6^{(7–2)}	(India) Yuki Bhambri (United States) Robert Galloway	(Netherlands) Tallon Griekspoor (Australia) Rinky Hijikata	(United States) Brandon Nakashima (France) Térence Atmane (Kazakhstan) Alexander Shevchenko (Lebanon) Benjamin Hassan
May 12	Piemonte Open; Turin, Italy; Clay – Challenger 175 – 28S/16Q/16D; Singles – Doubles	(Kazakhstan) Alexander Bublik; 6–3, 6–3	(China) Bu Yunchaokete	(Germany) Daniel Altmaier (Argentina) Camilo Ugo Carabelli	(Italy) Flavio Cobolli (Argentina) Tomás Martín Etcheverry (Chinese Taipei) Tseng Chun-hsin (Italy) Francesco Passaro
May 12	Piemonte Open; Turin, Italy; Clay – Challenger 175 – 28S/16Q/16D; Singles – Doubles	(Uruguay) Ariel Behar (Belgium) Joran Vliegen; 6–2, 6–4	(Netherlands) Robin Haase (Germany) Hendrik Jebens	(Germany) Daniel Altmaier (Argentina) Camilo Ugo Carabelli	(Italy) Flavio Cobolli (Argentina) Tomás Martín Etcheverry (Chinese Taipei) Tseng Chun-hsin (Italy) Francesco Passaro
May 12	Open de Oeiras II; Oeiras, Portugal; Clay – Challenger 100 – 32S/24Q/16D; Singles – Doubles	(Chile) Cristian Garín; 7–6^{(7–3)}, 4–6, 6–2	(United States) Mitchell Krueger	(Lebanon) Hady Habib (Argentina) Román Andrés Burruchaga	(China) Wu Yibing (Argentina) Thiago Agustín Tirante (Italy) Giulio Zeppieri (Portugal) Gastão Elias
May 12	Open de Oeiras II; Oeiras, Portugal; Clay – Challenger 100 – 32S/24Q/16D; Singles – Doubles	(Germany) Andreas Mies (Spain) David Vega Hernández; 6–4, 6–4	(Brazil) Marcelo Demoliner (Austria) David Pichler	(Lebanon) Hady Habib (Argentina) Román Andrés Burruchaga	(China) Wu Yibing (Argentina) Thiago Agustín Tirante (Italy) Giulio Zeppieri (Portugal) Gastão Elias
May 12	Tunis Open; Tunis, Tunisia; Clay – Challenger 75 – 32S/24Q/16D; Singles – Doubles	(Hungary) Zsombor Piros; 7–5, 7–6^{(7–3)}	(France) Titouan Droguet	(Luxembourg) Chris Rodesch; Ivan Gakhov	(France) Valentin Royer (Argentina) Federico Coria (Hong Kong) Coleman Wong (Italy) Francesco Maestrelli
May 12	Tunis Open; Tunis, Tunisia; Clay – Challenger 75 – 32S/24Q/16D; Singles – Doubles	(Czech Republic) Hynek Bartoň (Czech Republic) Michael Vrbenský; 5–7, 6–4, [10–7]	(India) Siddhant Banthia (Bulgaria) Alexander Donski	(Luxembourg) Chris Rodesch; Ivan Gakhov	(France) Valentin Royer (Argentina) Federico Coria (Hong Kong) Coleman Wong (Italy) Francesco Maestrelli
May 12	Zagreb Open; Zagreb, Croatia; Clay – Challenger 75 – 32S/24Q/16D; Singles – Doubles	(Croatia) Dino Prižmić; 6–2, 0–0 ret.	(France) Luca Van Assche	(France) Luka Pavlovic (Argentina) Marco Trungelliti	(Croatia) Mili Poljičak (Austria) Filip Misolic (France) Harold Mayot (Switzerland) Jérôme Kym
May 12	Zagreb Open; Zagreb, Croatia; Clay – Challenger 75 – 32S/24Q/16D; Singles – Doubles	(Croatia) Matej Dodig (Croatia) Nino Serdarušić; 6–4, 6–4	(Croatia) Luka Mikrut (Croatia) Mili Poljičak	(France) Luka Pavlovic (Argentina) Marco Trungelliti	(Croatia) Mili Poljičak (Austria) Filip Misolic (France) Harold Mayot (Switzerland) Jérôme Kym
May 12	Open Bogotá; Bogotá, Colombia; Clay – Challenger 50 – 32S/24Q/16D; Singles – Doubles	(United States) Patrick Kypson; 6–1, 6–3	(Brazil) Pedro Sakamoto	(Brazil) Pedro Rodrigues (Argentina) Hernán Casanova	(Spain) Nicolás Álvarez Varona (Brazil) Mateo Barreiros Reyes (Czech Republic) Zdeněk Kolář (Germany) Elmar Ejupovic
May 12	Open Bogotá; Bogotá, Colombia; Clay – Challenger 50 – 32S/24Q/16D; Singles – Doubles	(Brazil) Luís Britto (Czech Republic) Zdeněk Kolář; 6–4, 7–6^{(7–4)}	(Peru) Arklon Huertas del Pino (Peru) Conner Huertas del Pino	(Brazil) Pedro Rodrigues (Argentina) Hernán Casanova	(Spain) Nicolás Álvarez Varona (Brazil) Mateo Barreiros Reyes (Czech Republic) Zdeněk Kolář (Germany) Elmar Ejupovic
May 19	Macedonian Open; Skopje, North Macedonia; Clay – Challenger 75 – 32S/24Q/16D; Singles – Doubles	(United Kingdom) Jay Clarke; 6–2, 6–3	(Bosnia and Herzegovina) Nerman Fatić	(Bolivia) Hugo Dellien (Croatia) Mili Poljičak	(Poland) Daniel Michalski (Austria) Joel Schwärzler (Belgium) Michael Geerts (Germany) Christoph Negritu
May 19	Macedonian Open; Skopje, North Macedonia; Clay – Challenger 75 – 32S/24Q/16D; Singles – Doubles	(Czech Republic) Andrew Paulson (Czech Republic) Michael Vrbenský; 2–6, 6–4, [10–6]	(India) Sriram Balaji (Mexico) Miguel Ángel Reyes-Varela	(Bolivia) Hugo Dellien (Croatia) Mili Poljičak	(Poland) Daniel Michalski (Austria) Joel Schwärzler (Belgium) Michael Geerts (Germany) Christoph Negritu
May 19	Mziuri Cup; Tbilisi, Georgia; Hard – Challenger 50 – 32S/24Q/16D; Singles – Doubles	(Georgia (country)) Saba Purtseladze; 7–6^{(7–5)}, 6–4	(Italy) Federico Cinà	(United Kingdom) Charles Broom (United States) Martin Damm	(Slovakia) Lukáš Pokorný (Ivory Coast) Eliakim Coulibaly (Estonia) Daniil Glinka (United Kingdom) George Loffhagen
May 19	Mziuri Cup; Tbilisi, Georgia; Hard – Challenger 50 – 32S/24Q/16D; Singles – Doubles	(Japan) Masamichi Imamura (Japan) Naoki Tajima; 1–6, 6–3, [10–5]	(India) Siddhant Banthia (India) Ramkumar Ramanathan	(United Kingdom) Charles Broom (United States) Martin Damm	(Slovakia) Lukáš Pokorný (Ivory Coast) Eliakim Coulibaly (Estonia) Daniil Glinka (United Kingdom) George Loffhagen
May 26	Little Rock Challenger; Little Rock, United States; Hard – Challenger 75 – 32S/24Q/16D; Singles – Doubles	(United States) Patrick Kypson; 6–1, 1–6, 7–5	(United States) Michael Zheng	(Ecuador) Andrés Andrade (Canada) Liam Draxl	(Japan) Rio Noguchi (Japan) Naoki Nakagawa (United States) Andres Martin (Japan) Kenta Miyoshi
May 26	Little Rock Challenger; Little Rock, United States; Hard – Challenger 75 – 32S/24Q/16D; Singles – Doubles	(Tunisia) Aziz Dougaz (France) Antoine Escoffier; 6–2, 6–3	(Ecuador) Andrés Andrade (Colombia) Nicolás Mejía	(Ecuador) Andrés Andrade (Canada) Liam Draxl	(Japan) Rio Noguchi (Japan) Naoki Nakagawa (United States) Andres Martin (Japan) Kenta Miyoshi
May 26	Internazionali di Tennis Città di Vicenza; Vicenza, Italy; Clay – Challenger 75 – 32S/24Q/16D; Singles – Doubles	(Chinese Taipei) Tseng Chun-hsin; 6–3, 6–4	(Austria) Lukas Neumayer	(Luxembourg) Chris Rodesch (Switzerland) Jérôme Kym	(Austria) Joel Schwärzler (Argentina) Facundo Mena (Peru) Ignacio Buse (Croatia) Duje Ajduković
May 26	Internazionali di Tennis Città di Vicenza; Vicenza, Italy; Clay – Challenger 75 – 32S/24Q/16D; Singles – Doubles	(Italy) Federico Bondioli (Italy) Stefano Travaglia; 6–2, 6–1	(Denmark) August Holmgren (Denmark) Johannes Ingildsen	(Luxembourg) Chris Rodesch (Switzerland) Jérôme Kym	(Austria) Joel Schwärzler (Argentina) Facundo Mena (Peru) Ignacio Buse (Croatia) Duje Ajduković
May 26	Moldova Open; Chișinău, Moldova; Hard – Challenger 50 – 32S/24Q/16D; Singles – Doubles	(France) Clément Chidekh; 7–6^{(8–6)}, 7–5	Ilia Simakin	(United Kingdom) Giles Hussey (United Kingdom) Toby Samuel	Petr Bar Biryukov (Japan) Kaichi Uchida (United Kingdom) Stuart Parker (Latvia) Robert Strombachs
May 26	Moldova Open; Chișinău, Moldova; Hard – Challenger 50 – 32S/24Q/16D; Singles – Doubles	(Poland) Szymon Kielan (Poland) Filip Pieczonka; 6–4, 6–0	(Slovakia) Lukáš Pokorný; Ilia Simakin	(United Kingdom) Giles Hussey (United Kingdom) Toby Samuel	Petr Bar Biryukov (Japan) Kaichi Uchida (United Kingdom) Stuart Parker (Latvia) Robert Strombachs

=== June ===
Week of	Tournament	Champions	Runners-up	Semifinalists	Quarterfinalists
June 2	Birmingham Open; Birmingham, United Kingdom; Grass – Challenger 125 – 32S/24Q/16D; Singles – Doubles	(Finland) Otto Virtanen; 6–4, 6–4	(United States) Colton Smith	(Australia) Rinky Hijikata (United States) Brandon Holt	(South Africa) Lloyd Harris (Australia) Alex Bolt (Hong Kong) Coleman Wong (France) Adrian Mannarino
June 2	Birmingham Open; Birmingham, United Kingdom; Grass – Challenger 125 – 32S/24Q/16D; Singles – Doubles	(Brazil) Marcelo Demoliner (France) Sadio Doumbia; 6–4, 3–6, [10–5]	(Ecuador) Diego Hidalgo (United States) Patrik Trhac	(Australia) Rinky Hijikata (United States) Brandon Holt	(South Africa) Lloyd Harris (Australia) Alex Bolt (Hong Kong) Coleman Wong (France) Adrian Mannarino
June 2	Neckarcup; Heilbronn, Germany; Clay – Challenger 100 – 32S/24Q/16D; Singles – Doubles	(Peru) Ignacio Buse; 7–5, 7–5	(Netherlands) Guy den Ouden	(Germany) Marko Topo (Argentina) Marco Trungelliti	(Argentina) Facundo Mena (United States) Emilio Nava (Mexico) Rodrigo Pacheco Méndez (Italy) Francesco Passaro
June 2	Neckarcup; Heilbronn, Germany; Clay – Challenger 100 – 32S/24Q/16D; Singles – Doubles	(United States) Vasil Kirkov (Netherlands) Bart Stevens; 7–6^{(7–5)}, 4–6, [10–7]	(Germany) Jakob Schnaitter (Germany) Mark Wallner	(Germany) Marko Topo (Argentina) Marco Trungelliti	(Argentina) Facundo Mena (United States) Emilio Nava (Mexico) Rodrigo Pacheco Méndez (Italy) Francesco Passaro
June 2	UniCredit Czech Open; Prostějov, Czech Republic; Clay – Challenger 100 – 32S/24Q/16D; Singles – Doubles	(Bolivia) Hugo Dellien; 6–3, 6–4	(Chinese Taipei) Tseng Chun-hsin	(Ukraine) Vitaliy Sachko (Chile) Alejandro Tabilo	(Kazakhstan) Alexander Shevchenko (Bulgaria) Dimitar Kuzmanov (Austria) Jurij Rodionov (Hungary) Zsombor Piros
June 2	UniCredit Czech Open; Prostějov, Czech Republic; Clay – Challenger 100 – 32S/24Q/16D; Singles – Doubles	(Czech Republic) Petr Nouza (Czech Republic) Patrik Rikl; 4–6, 6–3, [10–4]	(Slovakia) Lukáš Pokorný (Czech Republic) Dalibor Svrčina	(Ukraine) Vitaliy Sachko (Chile) Alejandro Tabilo	(Kazakhstan) Alexander Shevchenko (Bulgaria) Dimitar Kuzmanov (Austria) Jurij Rodionov (Hungary) Zsombor Piros
June 2	Tyler Tennis Championships; Tyler, United States; Hard – Challenger 75 – 32S/24Q/16D; Singles – Doubles	(China) Wu Yibing; 6–4, 3–6, 6–3	(China) Zhou Yi	(Brazil) Karuê Sell (United States) Patrick Kypson	(United States) Andres Martin (United States) Alex Rybakov (Japan) Rio Noguchi (United States) Trevor Svajda
June 2	Tyler Tennis Championships; Tyler, United States; Hard – Challenger 75 – 32S/24Q/16D; Singles – Doubles	(New Zealand) Finn Reynolds (New Zealand) James Watt; 6–3, 6–1	(Spain) Àlex Martínez (Colombia) Adrià Soriano Barrera	(Brazil) Karuê Sell (United States) Patrick Kypson	(United States) Andres Martin (United States) Alex Rybakov (Japan) Rio Noguchi (United States) Trevor Svajda
June 9	Ilkley Open; Ilkley, United Kingdom; Grass – Challenger 125 – 32S/24Q/16D; Singles – Doubles	(Australia) Tristan Schoolkate; 6–7^{(8–10)}, 6–4, 6–3	(United Kingdom) Jack Pinnington Jones	(United States) Zachary Svajda (Japan) Shintaro Mochizuki	(Japan) Sho Shimabukuro (Switzerland) Leandro Riedi (Spain) Martín Landaluce (United Kingdom) Oliver Crawford
June 9	Ilkley Open; Ilkley, United Kingdom; Grass – Challenger 125 – 32S/24Q/16D; Singles – Doubles	(Ecuador) Diego Hidalgo (United States) Patrik Trhac; 6–3, 6–7^{(8–10)}, [10–7]	(United Kingdom) Charles Broom (United Kingdom) Ben Jones	(United States) Zachary Svajda (Japan) Shintaro Mochizuki	(Japan) Sho Shimabukuro (Switzerland) Leandro Riedi (Spain) Martín Landaluce (United Kingdom) Oliver Crawford
June 9	Internazionali di Tennis Città di Perugia; Perugia, Italy; Clay – Challenger 125 – 32S/24Q/16D; Singles – Doubles	(Italy) Andrea Pellegrino; 6–2, 6–4	(Bosnia and Herzegovina) Nerman Fatić	(Italy) Luca Nardi (Italy) Pierluigi Basile	(Italy) Francesco Passaro (France) Luka Pavlovic (Czech Republic) Dalibor Svrčina (Italy) Federico Arnaboldi
June 9	Internazionali di Tennis Città di Perugia; Perugia, Italy; Clay – Challenger 125 – 32S/24Q/16D; Singles – Doubles	(Monaco) Romain Arneodo (France) Manuel Guinard; 3–6, 6–3, [10–5]	(Netherlands) Robin Haase (United States) Vasil Kirkov	(Italy) Luca Nardi (Italy) Pierluigi Basile	(Italy) Francesco Passaro (France) Luka Pavlovic (Czech Republic) Dalibor Svrčina (Italy) Federico Arnaboldi
June 9	Bratislava Open; Bratislava, Slovakia; Clay – Challenger 100 – 32S/24Q/16D; Singles – Doubles	(Croatia) Dino Prižmić; 6–4, 7–6^{(8–6)}	(France) Valentin Royer	(Kazakhstan) Alexander Shevchenko (Chile) Cristian Garín	(Italy) Federico Cinà (Germany) Marko Topo (Croatia) Matej Dodig (Portugal) Henrique Rocha
June 9	Bratislava Open; Bratislava, Slovakia; Clay – Challenger 100 – 32S/24Q/16D; Singles – Doubles	(Czech Republic) Andrew Paulson (Czech Republic) Matěj Vocel; 6–1, 6–4	(Czech Republic) Jiří Barnat (Czech Republic) Filip Duda	(Kazakhstan) Alexander Shevchenko (Chile) Cristian Garín	(Italy) Federico Cinà (Germany) Marko Topo (Croatia) Matej Dodig (Portugal) Henrique Rocha
June 9	Open Sopra Steria de Lyon; Lyon, France; Clay – Challenger 100 – 32S/24Q/16D; Singles – Doubles	(Argentina) Marco Trungelliti; 6–3, 4–6, 6–3	(Spain) Daniel Mérida	(Belgium) Gauthier Onclin (France) Clément Tabur	(Spain) Pablo Carreño Busta (France) Luca Van Assche (Bulgaria) Dimitar Kuzmanov (Chinese Taipei) Hsu Yu-hsiou
June 9	Open Sopra Steria de Lyon; Lyon, France; Clay – Challenger 100 – 32S/24Q/16D; Singles – Doubles	(Chinese Taipei) Hsu Yu-hsiou (Japan) Kaichi Uchida; 1–6, 6–3, [12–10]	(France) Luca Sanchez (Japan) Seita Watanabe	(Belgium) Gauthier Onclin (France) Clément Tabur	(Spain) Pablo Carreño Busta (France) Luca Van Assche (Bulgaria) Dimitar Kuzmanov (Chinese Taipei) Hsu Yu-hsiou
June 9	Challenger Santa Fe; Santa Fe, Argentina; Clay – Challenger 50 – 32S/24Q/16D; Singles – Doubles	(Brazil) João Lucas Reis da Silva; 6–4, 6–3	(Argentina) Lautaro Midón	(Argentina) Andrea Collarini (United States) Dali Blanch	(Peru) Gonzalo Bueno (Argentina) Hernán Casanova (Brazil) Matheus Pucinelli de Almeida (Argentina) Santiago Rodríguez Taverna
June 9	Challenger Santa Fe; Santa Fe, Argentina; Clay – Challenger 50 – 32S/24Q/16D; Singles – Doubles	(Argentina) Mariano Kestelboim (Argentina) Gonzalo Villanueva; 6–1, 2–6, [11–9]	(Argentina) Santiago de la Fuente (Argentina) Genaro Alberto Olivieri	(Argentina) Andrea Collarini (United States) Dali Blanch	(Peru) Gonzalo Bueno (Argentina) Hernán Casanova (Brazil) Matheus Pucinelli de Almeida (Argentina) Santiago Rodríguez Taverna
June 16	Nottingham Open; Nottingham, United Kingdom; Grass – Challenger 125 – 32S/24Q/16D; Singles – Doubles	(Croatia) Marin Čilić; 6–2, 6–3	(Japan) Shintaro Mochizuki	(United States) Colton Smith (Spain) Martín Landaluce	(United States) Emilio Nava (Portugal) Jaime Faria (France) Térence Atmane (Chile) Tomás Barrios Vera
June 16	Nottingham Open; Nottingham, United Kingdom; Grass – Challenger 125 – 32S/24Q/16D; Singles – Doubles	(Mexico) Santiago González (United States) Austin Krajicek; 7–6^{(7–2)}, 6–4	(Brazil) Fernando Romboli (Australia) John-Patrick Smith	(United States) Colton Smith (Spain) Martín Landaluce	(United States) Emilio Nava (Portugal) Jaime Faria (France) Térence Atmane (Chile) Tomás Barrios Vera
June 16	Emilia-Romagna Open; Sassuolo, Italy; Clay – Challenger 125 – 32S/24Q/16D; Singles – Doubles	(Spain) Carlos Taberner; 7–6^{(7–1)}, 6–2	(Serbia) Dušan Lajović	(Italy) Francesco Passaro (Mexico) Rodrigo Pacheco Méndez	(France) Luca Van Assche (Sweden) Elias Ymer (Italy) Francesco Maestrelli (Spain) Daniel Rincón
June 16	Emilia-Romagna Open; Sassuolo, Italy; Clay – Challenger 125 – 32S/24Q/16D; Singles – Doubles	(Australia) Matthew Romios (United States) Ryan Seggerman; 7–6^{(7–4)}, 3–6, [10–7]	(Austria) Alexander Erler (Germany) Constantin Frantzen	(Italy) Francesco Passaro (Mexico) Rodrigo Pacheco Méndez	(France) Luca Van Assche (Sweden) Elias Ymer (Italy) Francesco Maestrelli (Spain) Daniel Rincón
June 16	Poznań Open; Poznań, Poland; Clay – Challenger 100 – 32S/24Q/16D; Singles – Doubles	(Austria) Filip Misolic; 6–2, 6–0	(Czech Republic) Dalibor Svrčina	(Chile) Cristian Garín (Argentina) Thiago Agustín Tirante	(Czech Republic) Martin Krumich (Austria) Jurij Rodionov (Czech Republic) Hynek Bartoň (Italy) Lorenzo Giustino
June 16	Poznań Open; Poznań, Poland; Clay – Challenger 100 – 32S/24Q/16D; Singles – Doubles	(Spain) Sergio Martos Gornés (India) Vijay Sundar Prashanth; 2–6, 7–5, [10–8]	(Romania) Alexandru Jecan (Romania) Bogdan Pavel	(Chile) Cristian Garín (Argentina) Thiago Agustín Tirante	(Czech Republic) Martin Krumich (Austria) Jurij Rodionov (Czech Republic) Hynek Bartoň (Italy) Lorenzo Giustino
June 16	Royan Atlantique Open; Royan, France; Clay – Challenger 50 – 32S/24Q/16D; Singles – Doubles	(France) Titouan Droguet; 4–6, 6–1, 6–4	(Bulgaria) Dimitar Kuzmanov	(Switzerland) Mika Brunold (Spain) Daniel Mérida	(France) Enzo Couacaud (Spain) Andrés Santamarta Roig (Switzerland) Kilian Feldbausch (Croatia) Luka Mikrut
June 16	Royan Atlantique Open; Royan, France; Clay – Challenger 50 – 32S/24Q/16D; Singles – Doubles	(Croatia) Matej Dodig (Croatia) Nino Serdarušić; 7–5, 6–7^{(4–7)}, [12–10]	(India) Adil Kalyanpur (India) Parikshit Somani	(Switzerland) Mika Brunold (Spain) Daniel Mérida	(France) Enzo Couacaud (Spain) Andrés Santamarta Roig (Switzerland) Kilian Feldbausch (Croatia) Luka Mikrut
June 16	Santa Cruz Challenger; Santa Cruz de la Sierra, Bolivia; Clay – Challenger 50 – 32S/24Q/16D; Singles – Doubles	(Argentina) Alex Barrena; 5–7, 7–5, 6–3	(Uruguay) Franco Roncadelli	(Brazil) João Lucas Reis da Silva (Argentina) Juan Manuel La Serna	(Argentina) Gonzalo Villanueva (Germany) Lucas Gerch (Argentina) Bautista Vilicich (Argentina) Lautaro Midón
June 16	Santa Cruz Challenger; Santa Cruz de la Sierra, Bolivia; Clay – Challenger 50 – 32S/24Q/16D; Singles – Doubles	(Argentina) Mariano Kestelboim (Argentina) Gonzalo Villanueva; 6–3, 6–2	(Bolivia) Boris Arias (Bolivia) Federico Zeballos	(Brazil) João Lucas Reis da Silva (Argentina) Juan Manuel La Serna	(Argentina) Gonzalo Villanueva (Germany) Lucas Gerch (Argentina) Bautista Vilicich (Argentina) Lautaro Midón
June 23	Aspria Tennis Cup; Milan, Italy; Clay – Challenger 75 – 32S/24Q/16D; Singles – Doubles	(Italy) Marco Cecchinato; 6–2, 6–3	(Croatia) Dino Prižmić	(Spain) Rafael Jódar (Italy) Jacopo Vasamì	(Germany) Christoph Negritu (France) Arthur Géa (Netherlands) Max Houkes (Croatia) Luka Mikrut
June 23	Aspria Tennis Cup; Milan, Italy; Clay – Challenger 75 – 32S/24Q/16D; Singles – Doubles	(Australia) Matthew Romios (United States) Ryan Seggerman; 3–6, 7–5, [10–8]	(United States) George Goldhoff (Chinese Taipei) Ray Ho	(Spain) Rafael Jódar (Italy) Jacopo Vasamì	(Germany) Christoph Negritu (France) Arthur Géa (Netherlands) Max Houkes (Croatia) Luka Mikrut
June 23	Lima Challenger; Lima, Peru; Clay – Challenger 50 – 32S/24Q/16D; Singles – Doubles	(Bolivia) Juan Carlos Prado Ángelo; 6–4, 7–5	(Peru) Gonzalo Bueno	(Brazil) Pedro Boscardin Dias (United States) Dali Blanch	(Colombia) Nicolás Mejía (Argentina) Alex Barrena (Brazil) Matheus Pucinelli de Almeida (Argentina) Genaro Alberto Olivieri
June 23	Lima Challenger; Lima, Peru; Clay – Challenger 50 – 32S/24Q/16D; Singles – Doubles	(Bolivia) Boris Arias (Bolivia) Federico Zeballos; 6–2, 1–6, [12–10]	(United States) Sekou Bangoura (Israel) Roy Stepanov	(Brazil) Pedro Boscardin Dias (United States) Dali Blanch	(Colombia) Nicolás Mejía (Argentina) Alex Barrena (Brazil) Matheus Pucinelli de Almeida (Argentina) Genaro Alberto Olivieri
June 30	Cary Tennis Classic; Cary, United States; Hard – Challenger 75 – 32S/24Q/16D; Singles – Doubles	(Japan) Rei Sakamoto; 6–1, 6–4	(Canada) Liam Draxl	(United States) Patrick Kypson (China) Wu Yibing	(Australia) Tristan Schoolkate (Canada) Alexis Galarneau (United States) Michael Zheng (United States) Aidan Mayo
June 30	Cary Tennis Classic; Cary, United States; Hard – Challenger 75 – 32S/24Q/16D; Singles – Doubles	(New Zealand) Finn Reynolds (New Zealand) James Watt; 6–3, 6–7^{(2–7)}, [10–5]	(Australia) Patrick Harper (United States) Trey Hilderbrand	(United States) Patrick Kypson (China) Wu Yibing	(Australia) Tristan Schoolkate (Canada) Alexis Galarneau (United States) Michael Zheng (United States) Aidan Mayo
June 30	Ion Țiriac Challenger; Brașov, Romania; Clay – Challenger 75 – 32S/24Q/16D; Singles – Doubles	(Italy) Francesco Maestrelli; 7–6^{(9–7)}, 6–4	(France) Luka Pavlovic	(France) Tom Paris (Argentina) Juan Pablo Ficovich	(Germany) Marko Topo (Romania) Radu Mihai Papoe (Romania) Gabi Adrian Boitan (Portugal) Frederico Ferreira Silva
June 30	Ion Țiriac Challenger; Brașov, Romania; Clay – Challenger 75 – 32S/24Q/16D; Singles – Doubles	(Ukraine) Vladyslav Orlov (Argentina) Santiago Rodríguez Taverna; 4–6, 7–6^{(7–5)}, [10–7]	(Romania) Alexandru Jecan (Romania) Bogdan Pavel	(France) Tom Paris (Argentina) Juan Pablo Ficovich	(Germany) Marko Topo (Romania) Radu Mihai Papoe (Romania) Gabi Adrian Boitan (Portugal) Frederico Ferreira Silva
June 30	Modena Challenger; Modena, Italy; Clay – Challenger 75 – 32S/24Q/16D; Singles – Doubles	(Italy) Stefano Travaglia; 6–4, 6–3	(Brazil) Thiago Seyboth Wild	(Switzerland) Jérôme Kym (Italy) Federico Cinà	(Italy) Marco Cecchinato (Greece) Stefanos Sakellaridis (Argentina) Juan Manuel Cerúndolo (Italy) Andrea Pellegrino
June 30	Modena Challenger; Modena, Italy; Clay – Challenger 75 – 32S/24Q/16D; Singles – Doubles	(Argentina) Federico Agustín Gómez (Venezuela) Luis David Martínez; 7–5, 7–6^{(7–5)}	(Denmark) Johannes Ingildsen (Slovakia) Miloš Karol	(Switzerland) Jérôme Kym (Italy) Federico Cinà	(Italy) Marco Cecchinato (Greece) Stefanos Sakellaridis (Argentina) Juan Manuel Cerúndolo (Italy) Andrea Pellegrino
June 30	Internationaux de Tennis de Troyes; Troyes, France; Clay – Challenger 50 – 32S/24Q/16D; Singles – Doubles	(United Kingdom) Jan Choinski; 6–4, 6–7^{(4–7)}, 6–2	(France) Calvin Hemery	(Argentina) Marco Trungelliti (Italy) Jacopo Berrettini	(Spain) Nikolás Sánchez Izquierdo (France) Harold Mayot (Slovakia) Norbert Gombos (Spain) Javier Barranco Cosano
June 30	Internationaux de Tennis de Troyes; Troyes, France; Clay – Challenger 50 – 32S/24Q/16D; Singles – Doubles	(Spain) Mario Mansilla Díez (Spain) Bruno Pujol Navarro; 7–6^{(7–3)}, 7–6^{(7–2)}	(Czech Republic) David Poljak (Germany) Tim Rühl	(Argentina) Marco Trungelliti (Italy) Jacopo Berrettini	(Spain) Nikolás Sánchez Izquierdo (France) Harold Mayot (Slovakia) Norbert Gombos (Spain) Javier Barranco Cosano

=== July ===
Week of	Tournament	Champions	Runners-up	Semifinalists	Quarterfinalists
July 7	Brawo Open; Braunschweig, Germany; Clay – Challenger 125 – 32S/24Q/16D; Singles – Doubles	(Argentina) Mariano Navone; 6–3, 7–5	(Argentina) Juan Manuel Cerúndolo	(Austria) Filip Misolic (Slovakia) Alex Molčan	(Germany) Yannick Hanfmann (Netherlands) Botic van de Zandschulp (Belgium) Raphaël Collignon (Spain) Roberto Carballés Baena
July 7	Brawo Open; Braunschweig, Germany; Clay – Challenger 125 – 32S/24Q/16D; Singles – Doubles	(United States) Vasil Kirkov (Netherlands) Bart Stevens; 6–2, 6–3	(Peru) Alexander Merino (Germany) Christoph Negritu	(Austria) Filip Misolic (Slovakia) Alex Molčan	(Germany) Yannick Hanfmann (Netherlands) Botic van de Zandschulp (Belgium) Raphaël Collignon (Spain) Roberto Carballés Baena
July 7	Hall of Fame Open; Newport, United States; Grass – Challenger 125 – 32S/24Q/16D; Singles – Doubles	(United States) Zachary Svajda; 7–5, 6–3	(France) Adrian Mannarino	(United States) Eliot Spizzirri (France) Antoine Ghibaudo	(Japan) Yosuke Watanuki (Australia) Tristan Schoolkate (Australia) Bernard Tomic (New Zealand) James Watt
July 7	Hall of Fame Open; Newport, United States; Grass – Challenger 125 – 32S/24Q/16D; Singles – Doubles	(United States) Robert Cash (United States) JJ Tracy; 7–6^{(7–3)}, 6–3	(Mexico) Hans Hach Verdugo (Colombia) Cristian Rodríguez	(United States) Eliot Spizzirri (France) Antoine Ghibaudo	(Japan) Yosuke Watanuki (Australia) Tristan Schoolkate (Australia) Bernard Tomic (New Zealand) James Watt
July 7	Iași Open; Iași, Romania; Clay – Challenger 100 – 32S/24Q/16D; Singles – Doubles	(Denmark) Elmer Møller; 3–6, 6–1, 7–6^{(7–2)}	(France) Titouan Droguet	(Croatia) Duje Ajduković (Switzerland) Stan Wawrinka	(Brazil) João Lucas Reis da Silva (Bolivia) Murkel Dellien (Italy) Francesco Maestrelli (Moldova) Radu Albot
July 7	Iași Open; Iași, Romania; Clay – Challenger 100 – 32S/24Q/16D; Singles – Doubles	(Poland) Szymon Kielan (Poland) Filip Pieczonka; 7–5, 6–3	(Canada) Cleeve Harper (United States) Ryan Seggerman	(Croatia) Duje Ajduković (Switzerland) Stan Wawrinka	(Brazil) João Lucas Reis da Silva (Bolivia) Murkel Dellien (Italy) Francesco Maestrelli (Moldova) Radu Albot
July 7	Internazionali di Tennis Città di Trieste; Trieste, Italy; Clay – Challenger 100 – 32S/24Q/16D; Singles – Doubles	(Croatia) Matej Dodig; 6–3, 6–4	(Argentina) Thiago Agustín Tirante	(India) Sumit Nagal (Argentina) Facundo Díaz Acosta	(Czech Republic) Maxim Mrva (Austria) Lukas Neumayer (Italy) Stefano Travaglia (Argentina) Santiago Rodríguez Taverna
July 7	Internazionali di Tennis Città di Trieste; Trieste, Italy; Clay – Challenger 100 – 32S/24Q/16D; Singles – Doubles	(Switzerland) Jakub Paul (Czech Republic) Matěj Vocel; 7–5, 6–1	(Netherlands) Robin Haase (Denmark) Johannes Ingildsen	(India) Sumit Nagal (Argentina) Facundo Díaz Acosta	(Czech Republic) Maxim Mrva (Austria) Lukas Neumayer (Italy) Stefano Travaglia (Argentina) Santiago Rodríguez Taverna
July 7	Winnipeg National Bank Challenger; Winnipeg, Canada; Hard – Challenger 75 – 32S/24Q/16D; Singles – Doubles	(Canada) Liam Draxl; 1–6, 6–3, 6–4	(Belgium) Alexander Blockx	(Japan) Sho Shimabukuro (China) Zhou Yi	(Japan) Yuta Shimizu (Chinese Taipei) Hsu Yu-hsiou (Ecuador) Andrés Andrade (Japan) Rio Noguchi
July 7	Winnipeg National Bank Challenger; Winnipeg, Canada; Hard – Challenger 75 – 32S/24Q/16D; Singles – Doubles	(United States) Keshav Chopra (United States) Andres Martin; 7–6^{(7–2)}, 3–6, [10–3]	(Japan) Naoki Nakagawa (South Africa) Kris van Wyk	(Japan) Sho Shimabukuro (China) Zhou Yi	(Japan) Yuta Shimizu (Chinese Taipei) Hsu Yu-hsiou (Ecuador) Andrés Andrade (Japan) Rio Noguchi
July 7	Lexus Nottingham Challenger II; Nottingham, United Kingdom; Grass – Challenger 50 – 32S/24Q/16D; Singles – Doubles	(United Kingdom) Jack Pinnington Jones; 6–4, 7–6^{(7–1)}	(United Kingdom) Kyle Edmund	(United Kingdom) Hamish Stewart (United Kingdom) Oliver Crawford	(Germany) Patrick Zahraj (United Kingdom) Ryan Peniston (United Kingdom) Alastair Gray (Australia) Edward Winter
July 7	Lexus Nottingham Challenger II; Nottingham, United Kingdom; Grass – Challenger 50 – 32S/24Q/16D; Singles – Doubles	(United Kingdom) Scott Duncan (United Kingdom) James MacKinlay; 7–5, 4–6, [20–18]	(United Kingdom) Charles Broom (United Kingdom) Mark Whitehouse	(United Kingdom) Hamish Stewart (United Kingdom) Oliver Crawford	(Germany) Patrick Zahraj (United Kingdom) Ryan Peniston (United Kingdom) Alastair Gray (Australia) Edward Winter
July 14	San Marino Open; San Marino, San Marino; Clay – Challenger 125 – 32S/24Q/16D; Singles – Doubles	(Slovakia) Lukáš Klein; 6–3, 6–4	(Croatia) Dino Prižmić	(Italy) Matteo Gigante (Argentina) Thiago Agustín Tirante	(Austria) Lukas Neumayer (France) Luka Pavlovic (Germany) Justin Engel (France) Harold Mayot
July 14	San Marino Open; San Marino, San Marino; Clay – Challenger 125 – 32S/24Q/16D; Singles – Doubles	(Poland) Karol Drzewiecki (Chinese Taipei) Ray Ho; 7–5, 7–6^{(7–3)}	(Slovakia) Miloš Karol (Ukraine) Vitaliy Sachko	(Italy) Matteo Gigante (Argentina) Thiago Agustín Tirante	(Austria) Lukas Neumayer (France) Luka Pavlovic (Germany) Justin Engel (France) Harold Mayot
July 14	Dutch Open; Bunschoten, Netherlands; Clay – Challenger 75 – 32S/24Q/16D; Singles – Doubles	(United Kingdom) Jan Choinski; 6–4, 3–6, 6–3	(Belgium) Kimmer Coppejans	(Argentina) Alex Barrena (Netherlands) Guy den Ouden	(Argentina) Nicolás Kicker (France) Geoffrey Blancaneaux (Lebanon) Benjamin Hassan (Belgium) Gauthier Onclin
July 14	Dutch Open; Bunschoten, Netherlands; Clay – Challenger 75 – 32S/24Q/16D; Singles – Doubles	(Belgium) Michael Geerts (Germany) Tim Rühl; 7–5, 7–6^{(7–4)}	(Netherlands) Mats Hermans (Netherlands) Mick Veldheer	(Argentina) Alex Barrena (Netherlands) Guy den Ouden	(Argentina) Nicolás Kicker (France) Geoffrey Blancaneaux (Lebanon) Benjamin Hassan (Belgium) Gauthier Onclin
July 14	Championnats Banque Nationale de Granby; Granby, Canada; Hard – Challenger 75 – 32S/24Q/16D; Singles – Doubles	(Denmark) August Holmgren; 6–3, 6–3	(Canada) Liam Draxl	(United States) Eliot Spizzirri (Belgium) Alexander Blockx	(Japan) James Trotter (Japan) Yuta Shimizu (Canada) Alexis Galarneau (Japan) Sho Shimabukuro
July 14	Championnats Banque Nationale de Granby; Granby, Canada; Hard – Challenger 75 – 32S/24Q/16D; Singles – Doubles	(New Zealand) Finn Reynolds (New Zealand) James Watt; 6–3, 6–4	(Australia) Kody Pearson (Japan) Yuta Shimizu	(United States) Eliot Spizzirri (Belgium) Alexander Blockx	(Japan) James Trotter (Japan) Yuta Shimizu (Canada) Alexis Galarneau (Japan) Sho Shimabukuro
July 14	Open de Tenis Ciudad de Pozoblanco; Pozoblanco, Spain; Hard – Challenger 75 – 32S/24Q/16D; Singles – Doubles	(Spain) Daniel Mérida; 6–3, 6–4	(China) Sun Fajing	(United Kingdom) Oliver Crawford (Portugal) Tiago Pereira	(France) Hugo Grenier (United Kingdom) Johannus Monday (Lithuania) Edas Butvilas (India) Aryan Shah
July 14	Open de Tenis Ciudad de Pozoblanco; Pozoblanco, Spain; Hard – Challenger 75 – 32S/24Q/16D; Singles – Doubles	(Spain) Iñaki Montes de la Torre (China) Sun Fajing; 6–1, 7–6^{(10–8)}	(Bulgaria) Anthony Genov (Israel) Roy Stepanov	(United Kingdom) Oliver Crawford (Portugal) Tiago Pereira	(France) Hugo Grenier (United Kingdom) Johannus Monday (Lithuania) Edas Butvilas (India) Aryan Shah
July 21	Zug Open; Zug, Switzerland; Clay – Challenger 125 – 32S/24Q/16D; Singles – Doubles	(Slovakia) Lukáš Klein; 6–2, 6–7^{(4–7)}, 6–4	(France) Harold Mayot	(Greece) Stefanos Sakellaridis (Switzerland) Jakub Paul	(Hungary) Zsombor Piros (Switzerland) Mika Brunold (Argentina) Facundo Díaz Acosta (Switzerland) Marc-Andrea Hüsler
July 21	Zug Open; Zug, Switzerland; Clay – Challenger 125 – 32S/24Q/16D; Singles – Doubles	(France) Geoffrey Blancaneaux / (France) Harold Mayot vs (South Korea) Nam Ji-sung / (Japan) Takeru Yuzuki; Not completed due to poor weather		(Greece) Stefanos Sakellaridis (Switzerland) Jakub Paul	(Hungary) Zsombor Piros (Switzerland) Mika Brunold (Argentina) Facundo Díaz Acosta (Switzerland) Marc-Andrea Hüsler
July 21	Cranbrook Tennis Classic; Bloomfield Hills, United States; Hard – Challenger 100 – 32S/24Q/16D; Singles – Doubles	(Estonia) Mark Lajal; 6–7^{(7–9)}, 7–5, 7–6^{(11–9)}	(United States) Andres Martin	(Chinese Taipei) Hsu Yu-hsiou (United States) Eliot Spizzirri	(Chinese Taipei) Wu Tung-lin (United Kingdom) Arthur Fery (China) Zhou Yi (Canada) Alexis Galarneau
July 21	Cranbrook Tennis Classic; Bloomfield Hills, United States; Hard – Challenger 100 – 32S/24Q/16D; Singles – Doubles	(Chinese Taipei) Hsu Yu-hsiou (Chinese Taipei) Huang Tsung-hao; 4–6, 6–3, [11–9]	(United States) Theodore Winegar (United States) Michael Zheng	(Chinese Taipei) Hsu Yu-hsiou (United States) Eliot Spizzirri	(Chinese Taipei) Wu Tung-lin (United Kingdom) Arthur Fery (China) Zhou Yi (Canada) Alexis Galarneau
July 21	Tampere Open; Tampere, Finland; Clay – Challenger 75 – 32S/24Q/16D; Singles – Doubles	(Norway) Nicolai Budkov Kjær; 7–6^{(7–5)}, 6–7^{(2–7)}, 6–2	(France) Sascha Gueymard Wayenburg	(India) Sumit Nagal (Czech Republic) Hynek Bartoň	(Argentina) Nicolás Kicker (Belgium) Gilles-Arnaud Bailly (Italy) Federico Cinà (France) Mathys Erhard
July 21	Tampere Open; Tampere, Finland; Clay – Challenger 75 – 32S/24Q/16D; Singles – Doubles	(Germany) Christoph Negritu (Ukraine) Vladyslav Orlov; 7–5, 6–1	(Netherlands) Mats Hermans (Netherlands) Mick Veldheer	(India) Sumit Nagal (Czech Republic) Hynek Bartoň	(Argentina) Nicolás Kicker (Belgium) Gilles-Arnaud Bailly (Italy) Federico Cinà (France) Mathys Erhard
July 21	Open Castilla y León; Segovia, Spain; Hard – Challenger 75 – 32S/24Q/16D; Singles – Doubles	(United Kingdom) George Loffhagen; 7–6^{(7–4)}, 6–7^{(4–7)}, 6–4	(Spain) Nicolás Álvarez Varona	(India) Aryan Shah (Lithuania) Edas Butvilas	(United Kingdom) Oliver Crawford (United Kingdom) Johannus Monday (Colombia) Adrià Soriano Barrera (Spain) Rafael Jódar
July 21	Open Castilla y León; Segovia, Spain; Hard – Challenger 75 – 32S/24Q/16D; Singles – Doubles	(Chile) Matías Soto (Bolivia) Federico Zeballos; 3–6, 7–6^{(7–5)}, [16–14]	(France) Arthur Reymond (France) Luca Sanchez	(India) Aryan Shah (Lithuania) Edas Butvilas	(United Kingdom) Oliver Crawford (United Kingdom) Johannus Monday (Colombia) Adrià Soriano Barrera (Spain) Rafael Jódar
July 28	Porto Open; Porto, Portugal; Hard – Challenger 100 – 32S/24Q/16D; Singles – Doubles	(Tunisia) Moez Echargui; 6–3, 6–2	(Italy) Francesco Maestrelli	(France) Hugo Grenier (Spain) Alejandro Moro Cañas	(Sweden) Elias Ymer (Lithuania) Edas Butvilas (France) Antoine Escoffier (Portugal) Henrique Rocha
July 28	Porto Open; Porto, Portugal; Hard – Challenger 100 – 32S/24Q/16D; Singles – Doubles	(United States) George Goldhoff (Chinese Taipei) Ray Ho; 6–4, 6–4	(Colombia) Nicolás Barrientos (Belgium) Joran Vliegen	(France) Hugo Grenier (Spain) Alejandro Moro Cañas	(Sweden) Elias Ymer (Lithuania) Edas Butvilas (France) Antoine Escoffier (Portugal) Henrique Rocha
July 28	Platzmann Open; Hagen, Germany; Clay – Challenger 75 – 32S/24Q/16D; Singles – Doubles	(Germany) Yannick Hanfmann; 3–6, 6–2, 6–2	(Netherlands) Guy den Ouden	(Switzerland) Jérôme Kym (Sweden) Olle Wallin	(Netherlands) Botic van de Zandschulp (Germany) Niels McDonald (United Kingdom) Jan Choinski (Lithuania) Vilius Gaubas
July 28	Platzmann Open; Hagen, Germany; Clay – Challenger 75 – 32S/24Q/16D; Singles – Doubles	(Germany) Hendrik Jebens (France) Albano Olivetti; 6–4, 6–7^{(2–7)}, [10–8]	(United States) Vasil Kirkov (Netherlands) Bart Stevens	(Switzerland) Jérôme Kym (Sweden) Olle Wallin	(Netherlands) Botic van de Zandschulp (Germany) Niels McDonald (United Kingdom) Jan Choinski (Lithuania) Vilius Gaubas
July 28	Lexington Open; Lexington, United States; Hard – Challenger 75 – 32S/24Q/16D; Singles – Doubles	(United States) Zachary Svajda; 2–6, 6–3, 6–2	(Australia) Bernard Tomic	(Chinese Taipei) Hsu Yu-hsiou (United States) Eliot Spizzirri	(United States) Nishesh Basavareddy (United States) Michael Zheng (United Kingdom) Giles Hussey (India) Dhakshineswar Suresh
July 28	Lexington Open; Lexington, United States; Hard – Challenger 75 – 32S/24Q/16D; Singles – Doubles	(India) Anirudh Chandrasekar (India) Ramkumar Ramanathan; 6–4, 6–4	(Chinese Taipei) Hsu Yu-hsiou (Chinese Taipei) Huang Tsung-hao	(Chinese Taipei) Hsu Yu-hsiou (United States) Eliot Spizzirri	(United States) Nishesh Basavareddy (United States) Michael Zheng (United Kingdom) Giles Hussey (India) Dhakshineswar Suresh
July 28	Svijany Open; Liberec, Czech Republic; Clay – Challenger 75 – 32S/24Q/16D; Singles – Doubles	(Peru) Gonzalo Bueno; 6–2, 2–0 ret.	(Argentina) Genaro Alberto Olivieri	(Poland) Daniel Michalski (Slovakia) Norbert Gombos	(Monaco) Valentin Vacherot (United Kingdom) Jack Pinnington Jones (Argentina) Andrea Collarini (Czech Republic) Maxim Mrva
July 28	Svijany Open; Liberec, Czech Republic; Clay – Challenger 75 – 32S/24Q/16D; Singles – Doubles	(Czech Republic) Andrew Paulson (Czech Republic) Michael Vrbenský; 6–4, 6–1	(Czech Republic) Jiří Barnat (Czech Republic) Filip Duda	(Poland) Daniel Michalski (Slovakia) Norbert Gombos	(Monaco) Valentin Vacherot (United Kingdom) Jack Pinnington Jones (Argentina) Andrea Collarini (Czech Republic) Maxim Mrva
July 28	President's Cup; Astana, Kazakhstan; Hard – Challenger 50 – 32S/24Q/16D; Singles – Doubles	(Norway) Nicolai Budkov Kjær; 6–4, 6–3	(Italy) Alexandr Binda	(Jordan) Abdullah Shelbayh (Japan) Shintaro Imai	(France) Clément Chidekh (India) Karan Singh (Georgia (country)) Aleksandre Bakshi (Lithuania) Ričardas Berankis
July 28	President's Cup; Astana, Kazakhstan; Hard – Challenger 50 – 32S/24Q/16D; Singles – Doubles	(Japan) Taisei Ichikawa (Japan) Kokoro Isomura; 7–5, 2–6, [10–5]	(Philippines) Francis Alcantara (South Korea) Park Ui-sung	(Jordan) Abdullah Shelbayh (Japan) Shintaro Imai	(France) Clément Chidekh (India) Karan Singh (Georgia (country)) Aleksandre Bakshi (Lithuania) Ričardas Berankis

=== August ===
Week of	Tournament	Champions	Runners-up	Semifinalists	Quarterfinalists
August 4	Kozerki Open; Grodzisk Mazowiecki, Poland; Hard – Challenger 75 – 32S/24Q/16D; Singles – Doubles	(Poland) Kamil Majchrzak; 6–4, 6–3	(Croatia) Dino Prižmić	(France) Ugo Blanchet (France) Harold Mayot	(Estonia) Daniil Glinka (Italy) Federico Cinà (Italy) Giulio Zeppieri (Italy) Francesco Maestrelli
August 4	Kozerki Open; Grodzisk Mazowiecki, Poland; Hard – Challenger 75 – 32S/24Q/16D; Singles – Doubles	(Netherlands) Thijmen Loof (France) Arthur Reymond; 6–4, 6–7^{(3–7)}, [16–14]	(South Korea) Nam Ji-sung (Japan) Takeru Yuzuki	(France) Ugo Blanchet (France) Harold Mayot	(Estonia) Daniil Glinka (Italy) Federico Cinà (Italy) Giulio Zeppieri (Italy) Francesco Maestrelli
August 4	Bonn Open; Bonn, Germany; Clay – Challenger 75 – 32S/24Q/16D; Singles – Doubles	(Austria) Jurij Rodionov; 3–6, 6–2, 6–4	(Kazakhstan) Timofey Skatov	(Austria) Joel Schwärzler (Belgium) Raphaël Collignon	(Argentina) Lautaro Midón (Lithuania) Vilius Gaubas (Bulgaria) Yanaki Milev (Brazil) João Lucas Reis da Silva
August 4	Bonn Open; Bonn, Germany; Clay – Challenger 75 – 32S/24Q/16D; Singles – Doubles	(Austria) Neil Oberleitner (Netherlands) Mick Veldheer; 4–6, 7–6^{(7–3)}, [12–10]	(Germany) Tim Rühl (Germany) Patrick Zahraj	(Austria) Joel Schwärzler (Belgium) Raphaël Collignon	(Argentina) Lautaro Midón (Lithuania) Vilius Gaubas (Bulgaria) Yanaki Milev (Brazil) João Lucas Reis da Silva
August 4	Chicago Men's Challenger; Chicago, United States; Hard – Challenger 75 – 32S/24Q/16D; Singles – Doubles	(United States) Michael Zheng; 6–4, 6–2	(Chinese Taipei) Hsu Yu-hsiou	(Denmark) August Holmgren (United States) Garrett Johns	(United Kingdom) Giles Hussey (China) Wu Yibing (Lebanon) Hady Habib (United States) Trevor Svajda
August 4	Chicago Men's Challenger; Chicago, United States; Hard – Challenger 75 – 32S/24Q/16D; Singles – Doubles	(United States) Mac Kiger (United States) Ryan Seggerman; 6–4, 3–6, [10–5]	(United States) Theodore Winegar (United States) Michael Zheng	(Denmark) August Holmgren (United States) Garrett Johns	(United Kingdom) Giles Hussey (China) Wu Yibing (Lebanon) Hady Habib (United States) Trevor Svajda
August 4	Internazionali di Tennis del Friuli Venezia Giulia; Cordenons, Italy; Clay – Challenger 75 – 32S/24Q/16D; Singles – Doubles	(Serbia) Dušan Lajović; 6–2, 7–6^{(7–3)}	(Austria) Lukas Neumayer	(Spain) Carlos Taberner (Germany) Cedrik-Marcel Stebe	(Peru) Gonzalo Bueno (Argentina) Nicolás Kicker (Hungary) Zsombor Piros (Argentina) Santiago Rodríguez Taverna
August 4	Internazionali di Tennis del Friuli Venezia Giulia; Cordenons, Italy; Clay – Challenger 75 – 32S/24Q/16D; Singles – Doubles	(Czech Republic) Andrew Paulson (Czech Republic) Michael Vrbenský; 6–4, 6–2	(Bolivia) Boris Arias (Bolivia) Murkel Dellien	(Spain) Carlos Taberner (Germany) Cedrik-Marcel Stebe	(Peru) Gonzalo Bueno (Argentina) Nicolás Kicker (Hungary) Zsombor Piros (Argentina) Santiago Rodríguez Taverna
August 11	Cancún Country Open; Cancún, Mexico; Hard – Challenger 125 – 28S/16Q/16D; Singles – Doubles	(Czech Republic) Dalibor Svrčina; 6–4, 5–7, 6–4	(Argentina) Thiago Agustín Tirante	(Peru) Ignacio Buse (Switzerland) Stan Wawrinka	(Germany) Daniel Altmaier (Netherlands) Jesper de Jong (Argentina) Juan Manuel Cerúndolo (France) Arthur Cazaux
August 11	Cancún Country Open; Cancún, Mexico; Hard – Challenger 125 – 28S/16Q/16D; Singles – Doubles	(Mexico) Santiago González (Netherlands) Jean-Julien Rojer; 7–6^{(7–2)}, 7–5	(France) Manuel Guinard (Brazil) Rafael Matos	(Peru) Ignacio Buse (Switzerland) Stan Wawrinka	(Germany) Daniel Altmaier (Netherlands) Jesper de Jong (Argentina) Juan Manuel Cerúndolo (France) Arthur Cazaux
August 11	Serve First Open; Sumter, United States; Hard – Challenger 125 – 28S/16Q/16D; Singles – Doubles	(Italy) Mattia Bellucci; 7–6^{(7–5)}, 3–1 ret.	(Kazakhstan) Alexander Shevchenko	(Portugal) Jaime Faria (Japan) Shintaro Mochizuki	(Estonia) Mark Lajal (Slovakia) Lukáš Klein (Austria) Filip Misolic (Georgia (country)) Nikoloz Basilashvili
August 11	Serve First Open; Sumter, United States; Hard – Challenger 125 – 28S/16Q/16D; Singles – Doubles	(United States) Ryan Seggerman (United States) Patrik Trhac; 6–4, 7–6^{(7–3)}	(India) Sriram Balaji (India) Rithvik Choudary Bollipalli	(Portugal) Jaime Faria (Japan) Shintaro Mochizuki	(Estonia) Mark Lajal (Slovakia) Lukáš Klein (Austria) Filip Misolic (Georgia (country)) Nikoloz Basilashvili
August 11	Kia Open Barranquilla; Barranquilla, Colombia; Hard – Challenger 75 – 32S/24Q/16D; Singles – Doubles	(United Kingdom) Arthur Fery; Walkover	(Australia) Bernard Tomic	(Argentina) Juan Pablo Ficovich (Colombia) Johan Alexander Rodríguez	(United States) Alfredo Perez (United States) Cannon Kingsley (Colombia) Nicolás Mejía (Chile) Tomás Barrios Vera
August 11	Kia Open Barranquilla; Barranquilla, Colombia; Hard – Challenger 75 – 32S/24Q/16D; Singles – Doubles	(United States) Benjamin Kittay (Colombia) Cristian Rodríguez; 6–2, 6–4	(Morocco) Taha Baadi (Canada) Dan Martin	(Argentina) Juan Pablo Ficovich (Colombia) Johan Alexander Rodríguez	(United States) Alfredo Perez (United States) Cannon Kingsley (Colombia) Nicolás Mejía (Chile) Tomás Barrios Vera
August 11	Internazionali di Tennis Città di Todi; Todi, Italy; Clay – Challenger 75 – 32S/24Q/16D; Singles – Doubles	(Kazakhstan) Timofey Skatov; 7–6^{(7–4)}, 0–6, 6–2	(Italy) Stefano Travaglia	(Monaco) Valentin Vacherot (Bolivia) Juan Carlos Prado Ángelo	(Italy) Gianmarco Ferrari (Norway) Nicolai Budkov Kjær (Austria) Lukas Neumayer (Italy) Marco Cecchinato
August 11	Internazionali di Tennis Città di Todi; Todi, Italy; Clay – Challenger 75 – 32S/24Q/16D; Singles – Doubles	(Italy) Filippo Romano (Italy) Jacopo Vasamì; 6–4, 6–3	(Israel) Daniel Cukierman (Denmark) Johannes Ingildsen	(Monaco) Valentin Vacherot (Bolivia) Juan Carlos Prado Ángelo	(Italy) Gianmarco Ferrari (Norway) Nicolai Budkov Kjær (Austria) Lukas Neumayer (Italy) Marco Cecchinato
August 11	Crete Challenger III; Hersonissos, Greece; Hard – Challenger 50 – 32S/24Q/16D; Singles – Doubles	(Spain) Rafael Jódar; 6–4, 6–2	(France) Dan Added	(Czech Republic) Petr Brunclík (France) Laurent Lokoli	(United Kingdom) Harry Wendelken (Thailand) Maximus Jones (Italy) Pietro Fellin (Greece) Ioannis Xilas
August 11	Crete Challenger III; Hersonissos, Greece; Hard – Challenger 50 – 32S/24Q/16D; Singles – Doubles	(Italy) Filippo Moroni (United Kingdom) Stuart Parker; 6–4, 6–4	(France) Dan Added (France) Arthur Reymond	(Czech Republic) Petr Brunclík (France) Laurent Lokoli	(United Kingdom) Harry Wendelken (Thailand) Maximus Jones (Italy) Pietro Fellin (Greece) Ioannis Xilas
August 11	Izida Cup; Sofia, Bulgaria; Clay – Challenger 50 – 32S/24Q/16D; Singles – Doubles	(Czech Republic) Zdeněk Kolář; 6–2, 6–2	(Bolivia) Murkel Dellien	(Bosnia and Herzegovina) Nerman Fatić (United States) Dali Blanch	(Romania) Sebastian Gima (Spain) Nikolás Sánchez Izquierdo (Austria) Sandro Kopp (Croatia) Duje Ajduković
August 11	Izida Cup; Sofia, Bulgaria; Clay – Challenger 50 – 32S/24Q/16D; Singles – Doubles	(Serbia) Stefan Latinović; Marat Sharipov; 6–3, 2–6, [13–11]	(Slovakia) Miloš Karol (Finland) Patrik Niklas-Salminen	(Bosnia and Herzegovina) Nerman Fatić (United States) Dali Blanch	(Romania) Sebastian Gima (Spain) Nikolás Sánchez Izquierdo (Austria) Sandro Kopp (Croatia) Duje Ajduković
August 18	Izida Cup II; Sofia, Bulgaria; Clay – Challenger 75 – 32S/24Q/16D; Singles – Doubles	(Slovakia) Alex Molčan; 7–5, 6–4	(Austria) Joel Schwärzler	(Croatia) Matej Dodig; Marat Sharipov	(Bosnia and Herzegovina) Andrej Nedić (Uruguay) Franco Roncadelli (Italy) Franco Agamenone (Portugal) Frederico Ferreira Silva
August 18	Izida Cup II; Sofia, Bulgaria; Clay – Challenger 75 – 32S/24Q/16D; Singles – Doubles	(Austria) David Pichler (Croatia) Nino Serdarušić; 4–6, 7–6^{(7–2)}, [10–7]	(Romania) Alexandru Jecan (Romania) Bogdan Pavel	(Croatia) Matej Dodig; Marat Sharipov	(Bosnia and Herzegovina) Andrej Nedić (Uruguay) Franco Roncadelli (Italy) Franco Agamenone (Portugal) Frederico Ferreira Silva
August 18	Schwaben Open; Augsburg, Germany; Clay – Challenger 50 – 32S/24Q/16D; Singles – Doubles	(Germany) Cedrik-Marcel Stebe; 6–3, 6–3	(Switzerland) Alexander Ritschard	(Czech Republic) Zdeněk Kolář (Germany) Henri Squire	(Germany) Benito Sanchez Martinez (Czech Republic) Matyáš Černý (Spain) Nikolás Sánchez Izquierdo (Germany) Christoph Negritu
August 18	Schwaben Open; Augsburg, Germany; Clay – Challenger 50 – 32S/24Q/16D; Singles – Doubles	(Germany) Daniel Masur (Germany) Benito Sanchez Martinez; 7–6^{(7–2)}, 6–2	(Czech Republic) Jiří Barnat (Czech Republic) Filip Duda	(Czech Republic) Zdeněk Kolář (Germany) Henri Squire	(Germany) Benito Sanchez Martinez (Czech Republic) Matyáš Černý (Spain) Nikolás Sánchez Izquierdo (Germany) Christoph Negritu
August 18	Crete Challenger IV; Hersonissos, Greece; Hard – Challenger 50 – 32S/24Q/16D; Singles – Doubles	(Tunisia) Moez Echargui; 5–7, 6–4, 3–0 ret.	(France) Dan Added	(France) Robin Bertrand (Spain) Rafael Jódar	(Germany) Mats Rosenkranz (Switzerland) Jakub Paul (Greece) Stefanos Sakellaridis (Greece) Ioannis Xilas
August 18	Crete Challenger IV; Hersonissos, Greece; Hard – Challenger 50 – 32S/24Q/16D; Singles – Doubles	(Germany) Mats Rosenkranz (United Kingdom) Harry Wendelken; 4–6, 6–4, [10–7]	(Romania) Victor Vlad Cornea (Finland) Patrik Niklas-Salminen	(France) Robin Bertrand (Spain) Rafael Jódar	(Germany) Mats Rosenkranz (Switzerland) Jakub Paul (Greece) Stefanos Sakellaridis (Greece) Ioannis Xilas
August 25	Città di Como Challenger; Como, Italy; Clay – Challenger 75 – 32S/24Q/16D; Singles – Doubles	(Croatia) Luka Mikrut; 6–3, 7–5	(Croatia) Duje Ajduković	(Norway) Nicolai Budkov Kjær (Argentina) Juan Bautista Torres	(Italy) Raúl Brancaccio (Germany) Henri Squire (Italy) Jacopo Berrettini (Brazil) Thiago Monteiro
August 25	Città di Como Challenger; Como, Italy; Clay – Challenger 75 – 32S/24Q/16D; Singles – Doubles	(Romania) Victor Vlad Cornea (Argentina) Santiago Rodríguez Taverna; 6–3, 6–2	(Israel) Daniel Cukierman (Denmark) Johannes Ingildsen	(Norway) Nicolai Budkov Kjær (Argentina) Juan Bautista Torres	(Italy) Raúl Brancaccio (Germany) Henri Squire (Italy) Jacopo Berrettini (Brazil) Thiago Monteiro
August 25	Rafa Nadal Open; Manacor, Spain; Hard – Challenger 75 – 32S/24Q/16D; Singles – Doubles	(Spain) Daniel Rincón; 7–6^{(7–3)}, 6–2	(Austria) Jurij Rodionov	(France) Harold Mayot (Lithuania) Edas Butvilas	(Colombia) Miguel Tobón (United Kingdom) Stuart Parker (Germany) Daniel Masur (Japan) Jay Dylan Friend
August 25	Rafa Nadal Open; Manacor, Spain; Hard – Challenger 75 – 32S/24Q/16D; Singles – Doubles	(Spain) Alberto Barroso Campos (Colombia) Adrià Soriano Barrera; 7–6^{(7–2)}, 3–6, [10–2]	(Austria) David Pichler (Austria) Jurij Rodionov	(France) Harold Mayot (Lithuania) Edas Butvilas	(Colombia) Miguel Tobón (United Kingdom) Stuart Parker (Germany) Daniel Masur (Japan) Jay Dylan Friend
August 25	Clube Tenis Porto Challenger; Porto, Portugal; Clay – Challenger 75 – 32S/24Q/16D; Singles – Doubles	(Netherlands) Guy den Ouden; 6–4, 6–2	(Belgium) Gilles-Arnaud Bailly	(Spain) Alejandro Moro Cañas (Portugal) Frederico Ferreira Silva	(Spain) Nikolás Sánchez Izquierdo (Spain) Nicolás Álvarez Varona (Spain) David Jordà Sanchis (Poland) Daniel Michalski
August 25	Clube Tenis Porto Challenger; Porto, Portugal; Clay – Challenger 75 – 32S/24Q/16D; Singles – Doubles	(Poland) Szymon Kielan (Poland) Filip Pieczonka; 6–2, 6–4	(Serbia) Ivan Sabanov (Serbia) Matej Sabanov	(Spain) Alejandro Moro Cañas (Portugal) Frederico Ferreira Silva	(Spain) Nikolás Sánchez Izquierdo (Spain) Nicolás Álvarez Varona (Spain) David Jordà Sanchis (Poland) Daniel Michalski
August 25	International Challenger Zhangjiagang; Zhangjiagang, China; Hard – Challenger 75 – 32S/24Q/16D; Singles – Doubles	(Japan) Sho Shimabukuro; 6–3, 3–6, 7–5	(United Kingdom) Oliver Crawford	(Japan) Kokoro Isomura (Japan) Yasutaka Uchiyama	(Japan) Renta Tokuda (South Korea) Shin San-hui; Ilia Simakin (Japan) Kaichi Uchida
August 25	International Challenger Zhangjiagang; Zhangjiagang, China; Hard – Challenger 75 – 32S/24Q/16D; Singles – Doubles	(Switzerland) Luca Castelnuovo (Australia) Akira Santillan; 6–3, 6–7^{(8–10)}, [10–3]	Petr Bar Biryukov (Italy) Alexandr Binda	(Japan) Kokoro Isomura (Japan) Yasutaka Uchiyama	(Japan) Renta Tokuda (South Korea) Shin San-hui; Ilia Simakin (Japan) Kaichi Uchida

=== September ===
Week of	Tournament	Champions	Runners-up	Semifinalists	Quarterfinalists
September 1	Copa Sevilla; Seville, Spain; Clay – Challenger 125 – 32S/24Q/16D; Singles – Doubles	(Peru) Ignacio Buse; 6–3, 3–6, 6–3	(Argentina) Genaro Alberto Olivieri	(Serbia) Dušan Lajović (Spain) Daniel Mérida	(Lithuania) Vilius Gaubas (Spain) Pablo Carreño Busta (Spain) David Jordà Sanchis (Spain) Carlos Taberner
September 1	Copa Sevilla; Seville, Spain; Clay – Challenger 125 – 32S/24Q/16D; Singles – Doubles	(Czech Republic) Jonáš Forejtek (Czech Republic) Dominik Kellovský; 2–6, 6–3, [10–5]	(Spain) Mario Mansilla Díez (Spain) Bruno Pujol Navarro	(Serbia) Dušan Lajović (Spain) Daniel Mérida	(Lithuania) Vilius Gaubas (Spain) Pablo Carreño Busta (Spain) David Jordà Sanchis (Spain) Carlos Taberner
September 1	AON Open Challenger; Genoa, Italy; Clay – Challenger 125 – 32S/24Q/16D; Singles – Doubles	(Italy) Luciano Darderi; 6–1, 6–3	(Italy) Andrea Pellegrino	(Germany) Tom Gentzsch (Italy) Stefano Travaglia	(Brazil) Thiago Monteiro (Switzerland) Kilian Feldbausch (Italy) Federico Bondioli (Italy) Andrea Picchione
September 1	AON Open Challenger; Genoa, Italy; Clay – Challenger 125 – 32S/24Q/16D; Singles – Doubles	(Netherlands) Mick Veldheer (Poland) Szymon Walków; 3–6, 6–4, [10–7]	(Italy) Gianluca Cadenasso (Italy) Lorenzo Carboni	(Germany) Tom Gentzsch (Italy) Stefano Travaglia	(Brazil) Thiago Monteiro (Switzerland) Kilian Feldbausch (Italy) Federico Bondioli (Italy) Andrea Picchione
September 1	NÖ Open; Tulln, Austria; Clay – Challenger 100 – 32S/24Q/16D; Singles – Doubles	(Argentina) Marco Trungelliti; 7–5, 6–1	(Czech Republic) Andrew Paulson	(Austria) Joel Schwärzler (Argentina) Santiago Rodríguez Taverna	(India) Sumit Nagal (Austria) Sandro Kopp (Ukraine) Oleg Prihodko (Italy) Francesco Maestrelli
September 1	NÖ Open; Tulln, Austria; Clay – Challenger 100 – 32S/24Q/16D; Singles – Doubles	(Austria) Neil Oberleitner (Austria) Joel Schwärzler; 5–7, 6–3, [10–7]	(Ukraine) Oleg Prihodko (Ukraine) Vitaliy Sachko	(Austria) Joel Schwärzler (Argentina) Santiago Rodríguez Taverna	(India) Sumit Nagal (Austria) Sandro Kopp (Ukraine) Oleg Prihodko (Italy) Francesco Maestrelli
September 1	Shanghai Challenger; Shanghai, China; Hard – Challenger 100 – 32S/24Q/16D; Singles – Doubles	(Italy) Giulio Zeppieri; 7–6^{(7–2)}, 7–5	(Japan) Yasutaka Uchiyama	(Chinese Taipei) Hsu Yu-hsiou (Australia) Bernard Tomic	(Poland) Filip Peliwo (China) Zhou Yi (Australia) Omar Jasika (Japan) Rio Noguchi
September 1	Shanghai Challenger; Shanghai, China; Hard – Challenger 100 – 32S/24Q/16D; Singles – Doubles	(Thailand) Pruchya Isaro (India) Niki Kaliyanda Poonacha; 6–4, 6–7^{(2–7)}, [10–8]	(Chinese Taipei) Jason Jung (United States) Reese Stalder	(Chinese Taipei) Hsu Yu-hsiou (Australia) Bernard Tomic	(Poland) Filip Peliwo (China) Zhou Yi (Australia) Omar Jasika (Japan) Rio Noguchi
September 1	Cassis Open Provence; Cassis, France; Hard – Challenger 75 – 32S/24Q/16D; Singles – Doubles	(United Kingdom) Billy Harris; 3–6, 7–5, 6–3	(Estonia) Daniil Glinka	(Austria) Jurij Rodionov (Germany) Justin Engel	(United Kingdom) Arthur Fery (Monaco) Valentin Vacherot (France) Maé Malige (Estonia) Mark Lajal
September 1	Cassis Open Provence; Cassis, France; Hard – Challenger 75 – 32S/24Q/16D; Singles – Doubles	(Austria) David Pichler (Austria) Jurij Rodionov; 7–6^{(7–2)}, 6–4	(France) Arthur Reymond (France) Luca Sanchez	(Austria) Jurij Rodionov (Germany) Justin Engel	(United Kingdom) Arthur Fery (Monaco) Valentin Vacherot (France) Maé Malige (Estonia) Mark Lajal
September 1	Istanbul Challenger; Istanbul, Turkey; Hard – Challenger 75 – 32S/24Q/16D; Singles – Doubles	(Slovakia) Alex Molčan; 7–6^{(11–9)}, 6–2	(Colombia) Nicolás Mejía	(Italy) Luca Potenza (Greece) Stefanos Sakellaridis	(Slovakia) Miloš Karol (France) Calvin Hemery (Jordan) Abdullah Shelbayh (France) Hugo Grenier
September 1	Istanbul Challenger; Istanbul, Turkey; Hard – Challenger 75 – 32S/24Q/16D; Singles – Doubles	(Slovakia) Miloš Karol (Germany) Daniel Masur; 7–6^{(7–2)}, 6–1	(Greece) Stefanos Sakellaridis (India) Karan Singh	(Italy) Luca Potenza (Greece) Stefanos Sakellaridis	(Slovakia) Miloš Karol (France) Calvin Hemery (Jordan) Abdullah Shelbayh (France) Hugo Grenier
September 8	Szczecin Open; Szczecin, Poland; Clay – Challenger 125 – 32S/24Q/16D; Singles – Doubles	(Argentina) Thiago Agustín Tirante; 6–3, 6–2	(Spain) Pablo Llamas Ruiz	(Argentina) Facundo Díaz Acosta (France) Geoffrey Blancaneaux	(Czech Republic) Vít Kopřiva (Germany) Henri Squire (Italy) Andrea Pellegrino (Ukraine) Vitaliy Sachko
September 8	Szczecin Open; Szczecin, Poland; Clay – Challenger 125 – 32S/24Q/16D; Singles – Doubles	(Ukraine) Denys Molchanov (Austria) David Pichler; 3–6, 7–6^{(7–1)}, [10–6]	Ivan Liutarevich (Spain) Bruno Pujol Navarro	(Argentina) Facundo Díaz Acosta (France) Geoffrey Blancaneaux	(Czech Republic) Vít Kopřiva (Germany) Henri Squire (Italy) Andrea Pellegrino (Ukraine) Vitaliy Sachko
September 8	Guangzhou Huangpu International Tennis Open; Guangzhou, China; Hard – Challenger 100 – 32S/24Q/16D; Singles – Doubles	(Argentina) Juan Manuel Cerúndolo; 6–2, 6–3	(Chile) Alejandro Tabilo	(Australia) Christopher O'Connell (United Kingdom) Billy Harris	Marat Sharipov (United States) Nishesh Basavareddy (Belgium) Gauthier Onclin (United Kingdom) Dan Evans
September 8	Guangzhou Huangpu International Tennis Open; Guangzhou, China; Hard – Challenger 100 – 32S/24Q/16D; Singles – Doubles	(Australia) Matthew Romios (United States) Ryan Seggerman; 6–1, 6–3	(Japan) Kaito Uesugi (Japan) Seita Watanabe	(Australia) Christopher O'Connell (United Kingdom) Billy Harris	Marat Sharipov (United States) Nishesh Basavareddy (Belgium) Gauthier Onclin (United Kingdom) Dan Evans
September 8	Open de Rennes; Rennes, France; Hard (i) – Challenger 100 – 32S/24Q/16D; Singles – Doubles	(France) Hugo Gaston; 6–4, 6–4	(Switzerland) Stan Wawrinka	(France) Clément Chidekh (Germany) Patrick Zahraj	(Ivory Coast) Eliakim Coulibaly (France) Harold Mayot (United States) Cannon Kingsley (Belgium) Michael Geerts
September 8	Open de Rennes; Rennes, France; Hard (i) – Challenger 100 – 32S/24Q/16D; Singles – Doubles	(Finland) Patrik Niklas-Salminen (Czech Republic) Matěj Vocel; 6–3, 6–3	(Germany) Hendrik Jebens (France) Albano Olivetti	(France) Clément Chidekh (Germany) Patrick Zahraj	(Ivory Coast) Eliakim Coulibaly (France) Harold Mayot (United States) Cannon Kingsley (Belgium) Michael Geerts
September 8	Winston-Salem Challenger; Winston-Salem, United States; Hard – Challenger 75 – 32S/24Q/16D; Singles – Doubles	(United Kingdom) Jack Pinnington Jones; 6–2, 6–2	(United States) Trevor Svajda	(United States) Christian Langmo (Spain) Rafael Jódar	(France) Antoine Ghibaudo (United States) Aidan Kim (United States) Mitchell Krueger (United States) Murphy Cassone
September 8	Winston-Salem Challenger; Winston-Salem, United States; Hard – Challenger 75 – 32S/24Q/16D; Singles – Doubles	(United States) Andrew Fenty (United States) Noah Schachter; 6–4, 6–4	(Venezuela) Juan José Bianchi (United States) Daniel Milavsky	(United States) Christian Langmo (Spain) Rafael Jódar	(France) Antoine Ghibaudo (United States) Aidan Kim (United States) Mitchell Krueger (United States) Murphy Cassone
September 8	Città di Biella; Biella, Italy; Clay – Challenger 50 – 32S/24Q/16D; Singles – Doubles	(Italy) Stefano Napolitano; 7–5, 6–3	(Switzerland) Kilian Feldbausch	(Italy) Gianluca Cadenasso (Croatia) Luka Mikrut	(Spain) Pol Martín Tiffon (Netherlands) Jelle Sels (Germany) Marko Topo (Czech Republic) Zdeněk Kolář
September 8	Città di Biella; Biella, Italy; Clay – Challenger 50 – 32S/24Q/16D; Singles – Doubles	(Italy) Gianluca Cadenasso (Italy) Filippo Romano; 6–3, 7–5	(Belgium) Buvaysar Gadamauri (Netherlands) Jelle Sels	(Italy) Gianluca Cadenasso (Croatia) Luka Mikrut	(Spain) Pol Martín Tiffon (Netherlands) Jelle Sels (Germany) Marko Topo (Czech Republic) Zdeněk Kolář
September 8	INTARO Open; Târgu Mureș, Romania; Clay – Challenger 50 – 32S/24Q/16D; Singles – Doubles	(Argentina) Marco Trungelliti; 6–1, 0–0 ret.	(Croatia) Mili Poljičak	(Romania) Filip Cristian Jianu (United Kingdom) Jay Clarke	(Italy) Franco Agamenone (Romania) Ștefan Paloși (Romania) Cezar Crețu (Italy) Andrea Picchione
September 8	INTARO Open; Târgu Mureș, Romania; Clay – Challenger 50 – 32S/24Q/16D; Singles – Doubles	(Austria) Neil Oberleitner (Croatia) Mili Poljičak; 6–0, 6–3	(Romania) Alexandru Cristian Dumitru (Romania) Dan Alexandru Tomescu	(Romania) Filip Cristian Jianu (United Kingdom) Jay Clarke	(Italy) Franco Agamenone (Romania) Ștefan Paloși (Romania) Cezar Crețu (Italy) Andrea Picchione
September 15	Layjet Open; Bad Waltersdorf, Austria; Clay – Challenger 125 – 32S/24Q/16D; Singles – Doubles	(United Kingdom) Jan Choinski; 7–5, 6–4	(Czech Republic) Vít Kopřiva	(Czech Republic) Zdeněk Kolář (Spain) Roberto Carballés Baena	(Italy) Francesco Passaro (Argentina) Román Andrés Burruchaga (Czech Republic) Hynek Bartoň (Spain) Pablo Carreño Busta
September 15	Layjet Open; Bad Waltersdorf, Austria; Clay – Challenger 125 – 32S/24Q/16D; Singles – Doubles	(Austria) David Pichler (Croatia) Nino Serdarušić; 6–3, 6–3	(Czech Republic) Jiří Barnat (Czech Republic) Filip Duda	(Czech Republic) Zdeněk Kolář (Spain) Roberto Carballés Baena	(Italy) Francesco Passaro (Argentina) Román Andrés Burruchaga (Czech Republic) Hynek Bartoň (Spain) Pablo Carreño Busta
September 15	Saint-Tropez Open; Saint-Tropez, France; Hard – Challenger 125 – 32S/24Q/16D; Singles – Doubles	(Tunisia) Moez Echargui; 6–3, 6–4	(France) Dan Added	(Switzerland) Stan Wawrinka (Estonia) Mark Lajal	(Spain) Martín Landaluce (France) Tom Paris (France) Titouan Droguet (France) Hugo Grenier
September 15	Saint-Tropez Open; Saint-Tropez, France; Hard – Challenger 125 – 32S/24Q/16D; Singles – Doubles	(United States) Trey Hilderbrand (United States) Mac Kiger; 7–6^{(7–5)}, 7–5	(Finland) Patrik Niklas-Salminen (Czech Republic) Matěj Vocel	(Switzerland) Stan Wawrinka (Estonia) Mark Lajal	(Spain) Martín Landaluce (France) Tom Paris (France) Titouan Droguet (France) Hugo Grenier
September 15	Columbus Challenger; Columbus, United States; Hard (i) – Challenger 75 – 32S/24Q/16D; Singles – Doubles	(United States) Michael Zheng; 3–6, 6–3, 7–5	(United States) Martin Damm	(Germany) Daniel Masur (United States) Samir Banerjee	(United States) Alfredo Perez (Spain) Rafael Jódar (Japan) James Trotter (United States) Tyler Zink
September 15	Columbus Challenger; Columbus, United States; Hard (i) – Challenger 75 – 32S/24Q/16D; Singles – Doubles	(Australia) Patrick Harper (United Kingdom) Johannus Monday; 6–4, 6–3	(United States) George Goldhoff (United States) Theodore Winegar	(Germany) Daniel Masur (United States) Samir Banerjee	(United States) Alfredo Perez (Spain) Rafael Jódar (Japan) James Trotter (United States) Tyler Zink
September 15	Challenger de Villa María; Villa María, Argentina; Clay – Challenger 75 – 32S/24Q/16D; Singles – Doubles	(United States) Emilio Nava; 6–3, 6–3	(Argentina) Alex Barrena	(Bolivia) Murkel Dellien (Argentina) Federico Agustín Gómez	(Bolivia) Juan Carlos Prado Ángelo (Italy) Francesco Maestrelli (Argentina) Facundo Bagnis (Argentina) Mariano Kestelboim
September 15	Challenger de Villa María; Villa María, Argentina; Clay – Challenger 75 – 32S/24Q/16D; Singles – Doubles	(Argentina) Guillermo Durán (Argentina) Mariano Kestelboim; 6–4, 6–2	(Brazil) Daniel Dutra da Silva (Argentina) Gonzalo Villanueva	(Bolivia) Murkel Dellien (Argentina) Federico Agustín Gómez	(Bolivia) Juan Carlos Prado Ángelo (Italy) Francesco Maestrelli (Argentina) Facundo Bagnis (Argentina) Mariano Kestelboim
September 15	INTARO Open II; Târgu Mureș, Romania; Clay – Challenger 50 – 32S/24Q/16D; Singles – Doubles	(Italy) Franco Agamenone; 6–3, 6–4	(United Kingdom) Jay Clarke	(Spain) Miguel Damas (France) Mathys Erhard	(Romania) Gabi Adrian Boitan (Italy) Andrea Picchione (France) Corentin Denolly (Spain) Daniel Rincón
September 15	INTARO Open II; Târgu Mureș, Romania; Clay – Challenger 50 – 32S/24Q/16D; Singles – Doubles	(Czech Republic) Dominik Reček (Czech Republic) Daniel Siniakov; 6–2, 5–7, [11–9]	(Italy) Simone Agostini (Italy) Tommaso Compagnucci	(Spain) Miguel Damas (France) Mathys Erhard	(Romania) Gabi Adrian Boitan (Italy) Andrea Picchione (France) Corentin Denolly (Spain) Daniel Rincón
September 22	Orléans Open; Orléans, France; Hard (i) – Challenger 125 – 32S/24Q/16D; Singles – Doubles	(Spain) Martín Landaluce; 6–7^{(6–8)}, 6–2, 6–3	(Belgium) Raphaël Collignon	(Germany) Justin Engel (Estonia) Mark Lajal	(Canada) Alexis Galarneau (United States) Patrick Kypson (Switzerland) Rémy Bertola (Norway) Nicolai Budkov Kjær
September 22	Orléans Open; Orléans, France; Hard (i) – Challenger 125 – 32S/24Q/16D; Singles – Doubles	(France) Clément Chidekh (France) Luca Sanchez; 6–4, 6–2	(France) Théo Arribagé (United Kingdom) Joshua Paris	(Germany) Justin Engel (Estonia) Mark Lajal	(Canada) Alexis Galarneau (United States) Patrick Kypson (Switzerland) Rémy Bertola (Norway) Nicolai Budkov Kjær
September 22	Jingshan Tennis Open; Jingshan, China; Hard – Challenger 100 – 32S/24Q/16D; Singles – Doubles	(United States) Eliot Spizzirri; 6–4, 6–4	(Australia) Alex Bolt	(Germany) Yannick Hanfmann (United States) Mackenzie McDonald	(Kazakhstan) Denis Yevseyev (South Africa) Lloyd Harris (United Kingdom) Billy Harris (Australia) Bernard Tomic
September 22	Jingshan Tennis Open; Jingshan, China; Hard – Challenger 100 – 32S/24Q/16D; Singles – Doubles	(India) Anirudh Chandrasekar (United States) Reese Stalder; 6–2, 2–6, [10–7]	(Chinese Taipei) Huang Tsung-hao (South Korea) Park Ui-sung	(Germany) Yannick Hanfmann (United States) Mackenzie McDonald	(Kazakhstan) Denis Yevseyev (South Africa) Lloyd Harris (United Kingdom) Billy Harris (Australia) Bernard Tomic
September 22	Lisboa Belém Open; Lisbon, Portugal; Clay – Challenger 100 – 32S/24Q/16D; Singles – Doubles	(Lithuania) Vilius Gaubas; 6–7^{(3–7)}, 6–3, 6–4	(Portugal) Henrique Rocha	(Italy) Stefano Travaglia (Peru) Ignacio Buse	(Switzerland) Alexander Ritschard (Spain) Pablo Llamas Ruiz (Argentina) Marco Trungelliti (Spain) Daniel Mérida
September 22	Lisboa Belém Open; Lisbon, Portugal; Clay – Challenger 100 – 32S/24Q/16D; Singles – Doubles	(Spain) Pablo Llamas Ruiz (Spain) Sergio Martos Gornés; 7–6^{(7–5)}, 6–4	(Romania) Alexandru Jecan (Romania) Bogdan Pavel	(Italy) Stefano Travaglia (Peru) Ignacio Buse	(Switzerland) Alexander Ritschard (Spain) Pablo Llamas Ruiz (Argentina) Marco Trungelliti (Spain) Daniel Mérida
September 22	Challenger de Buenos Aires; Buenos Aires, Argentina; Clay – Challenger 75 – 32S/24Q/16D; Singles – Doubles	(Argentina) Román Andrés Burruchaga; 7–6^{(7–4)}, 6–3	(Argentina) Alex Barrena	(Argentina) Nicolás Kicker (Ecuador) Álvaro Guillén Meza	(Argentina) Genaro Alberto Olivieri (Peru) Gonzalo Bueno (Argentina) Guido Iván Justo (Brazil) Matheus Pucinelli de Almeida
September 22	Challenger de Buenos Aires; Buenos Aires, Argentina; Clay – Challenger 75 – 32S/24Q/16D; Singles – Doubles	(Argentina) Guillermo Durán (Argentina) Mariano Kestelboim; 7–6^{(7–3)}, 6–1	(Brazil) Pedro Boscardin Dias (Brazil) João Lucas Reis da Silva	(Argentina) Nicolás Kicker (Ecuador) Álvaro Guillén Meza	(Argentina) Genaro Alberto Olivieri (Peru) Gonzalo Bueno (Argentina) Guido Iván Justo (Brazil) Matheus Pucinelli de Almeida
September 22	Las Vegas Challenger; Las Vegas, United States; Hard – Challenger 75 – 32S/24Q/16D; Singles – Doubles	(Jordan) Abdullah Shelbayh; 6–2, 6–4	(United States) Alex Rybakov	(Lebanon) Benjamin Hassan (United States) Andre Ilagan	(Austria) Jurij Rodionov (United States) Andrew Fenty (Australia) Philip Sekulic (Australia) Moerani Bouzige
September 22	Las Vegas Challenger; Las Vegas, United States; Hard – Challenger 75 – 32S/24Q/16D; Singles – Doubles	(United States) Benjamin Kittay (United States) Joshua Sheehy; 7–5, 7–6^{(7–2)}	(New Zealand) Finn Reynolds (New Zealand) James Watt	(Lebanon) Benjamin Hassan (United States) Andre Ilagan	(Austria) Jurij Rodionov (United States) Andrew Fenty (Australia) Philip Sekulic (Australia) Moerani Bouzige
September 29	Villena Open; Villena, Spain; Hard – Challenger 100 – 32S/24Q/16D; Singles – Doubles	(Spain) Pablo Carreño Busta; 4–6, 6–1, 6–4	(France) Hugo Grenier	(Czech Republic) Petr Brunclík (Spain) Daniel Mérida	(Italy) Luca Potenza (Spain) Martín Landaluce (United Kingdom) George Loffhagen (Germany) Tom Gentzsch
September 29	Villena Open; Villena, Spain; Hard – Challenger 100 – 32S/24Q/16D; Singles – Doubles	(Belgium) Sander Gillé (Netherlands) Sem Verbeek; 6–3, 6–4	(Czech Republic) Petr Nouza (Czech Republic) Patrik Rikl	(Czech Republic) Petr Brunclík (Spain) Daniel Mérida	(Italy) Luca Potenza (Spain) Martín Landaluce (United Kingdom) George Loffhagen (Germany) Tom Gentzsch
September 29	Antofagasta Challenger; Antofagasta, Chile; Clay – Challenger 75 – 32S/24Q/16D; Singles – Doubles	(Chile) Cristian Garín; 2–6, 6–3, 6–3	(Argentina) Facundo Díaz Acosta	(Brazil) João Lucas Reis da Silva (Paraguay) Daniel Vallejo	(Argentina) Federico Agustín Gómez (Ecuador) Álvaro Guillén Meza (Chile) Tomás Barrios Vera (Lebanon) Hady Habib
September 29	Antofagasta Challenger; Antofagasta, Chile; Clay – Challenger 75 – 32S/24Q/16D; Singles – Doubles	(Ecuador) Gonzalo Escobar (Mexico) Miguel Ángel Reyes-Varela; 6–3, 4–6, [10–6]	(Brazil) Luís Britto (Brazil) Matheus Pucinelli de Almeida	(Brazil) João Lucas Reis da Silva (Paraguay) Daniel Vallejo	(Argentina) Federico Agustín Gómez (Ecuador) Álvaro Guillén Meza (Chile) Tomás Barrios Vera (Lebanon) Hady Habib
September 29	Braga Open; Braga, Portugal; Clay – Challenger 75 – 32S/24Q/16D; Singles – Doubles	(Croatia) Luka Mikrut; 6–3, 6–4	(Lithuania) Vilius Gaubas	(Czech Republic) Zdeněk Kolář (Spain) Alejandro Moro Cañas	(Spain) Javier Barranco Cosano (Argentina) Marco Trungelliti (Denmark) Elmer Møller (India) Sumit Nagal
September 29	Braga Open; Braga, Portugal; Clay – Challenger 75 – 32S/24Q/16D; Singles – Doubles	(Brazil) Marcelo Demoliner (Brazil) Orlando Luz; 7–5, 5–7, [10–7]	(Bulgaria) Alexander Donski (Serbia) Stefan Latinović	(Czech Republic) Zdeněk Kolář (Spain) Alejandro Moro Cañas	(Spain) Javier Barranco Cosano (Argentina) Marco Trungelliti (Denmark) Elmer Møller (India) Sumit Nagal
September 29	Open de Vendée; Mouilleron-le-Captif, France; Hard (i) – Challenger 75 – 32S/24Q/16D; Singles – Doubles	(Norway) Nicolai Budkov Kjær; 6–0, 6–3	(United States) Patrick Kypson	(Belgium) Raphaël Collignon (France) Clément Chidekh	(United Kingdom) Arthur Fery (Finland) Emil Ruusuvuori (Italy) Francesco Passaro (Kazakhstan) Mikhail Kukushkin
September 29	Open de Vendée; Mouilleron-le-Captif, France; Hard (i) – Challenger 75 – 32S/24Q/16D; Singles – Doubles	(France) Grégoire Jacq (France) Albano Olivetti; 7–6^{(7–5)}, 6–3	(United Kingdom) Hamish Stewart (United Kingdom) Harry Wendelken	(Belgium) Raphaël Collignon (France) Clément Chidekh	(United Kingdom) Arthur Fery (Finland) Emil Ruusuvuori (Italy) Francesco Passaro (Kazakhstan) Mikhail Kukushkin
September 29	Tiburon Challenger; Tiburon, United States; Hard – Challenger 75 – 32S/24Q/16D; Singles – Doubles	(United States) Michael Zheng; 6–4, 6–4	(United States) Tyler Zink	(Jordan) Abdullah Shelbayh (Spain) Rafael Jódar	(Kazakhstan) Dmitry Popko (United States) Samir Banerjee (Colombia) Nicolás Mejía (United States) Mitchell Krueger
September 29	Tiburon Challenger; Tiburon, United States; Hard – Challenger 75 – 32S/24Q/16D; Singles – Doubles	(New Zealand) Finn Reynolds (New Zealand) James Watt; 6–2, 6–3	(United States) Benjamin Kittay (United States) Joshua Sheehy	(Jordan) Abdullah Shelbayh (Spain) Rafael Jódar	(Kazakhstan) Dmitry Popko (United States) Samir Banerjee (Colombia) Nicolás Mejía (United States) Mitchell Krueger

=== October ===
Week of	Tournament	Champions	Runners-up	Semifinalists	Quarterfinalists
October 6	Jinan Open; Jinan, China; Hard – Challenger 125 – 32S/24Q/16D; Singles – Doubles	(France) Arthur Cazaux; 6–3, 6–2	(United States) Mackenzie McDonald	(Japan) Shintaro Mochizuki; Petr Bar Biryukov	(China) Zhou Yi (Australia) Bernard Tomic (United States) Colton Smith (United States) Brandon Holt
October 6	Jinan Open; Jinan, China; Hard – Challenger 125 – 32S/24Q/16D; Singles – Doubles	(New Zealand) Finn Reynolds (New Zealand) James Watt; 7–5, 7–6^{(7–1)}	(India) Rithvik Choudary Bollipalli (India) Arjun Kadhe	(Japan) Shintaro Mochizuki; Petr Bar Biryukov	(China) Zhou Yi (Australia) Bernard Tomic (United States) Colton Smith (United States) Brandon Holt
October 6	Copa Faulcombridge; Valencia, Spain; Clay – Challenger 125 – 32S/24Q/16D; Singles – Doubles	(United Kingdom) Jan Choinski; 4–6, 6–1, 6–2	(Croatia) Luka Mikrut	(Germany) Henri Squire (Spain) Carlos Taberner	(Spain) Albert Ramos Viñolas (India) Sumit Nagal (Argentina) Marco Trungelliti (Germany) Christoph Negritu
October 6	Copa Faulcombridge; Valencia, Spain; Clay – Challenger 125 – 32S/24Q/16D; Singles – Doubles	(Brazil) Marcelo Demoliner (Brazil) Orlando Luz; 6–3, 3–6, [10–5]	(Spain) Íñigo Cervantes (Israel) Daniel Cukierman	(Germany) Henri Squire (Spain) Carlos Taberner	(Spain) Albert Ramos Viñolas (India) Sumit Nagal (Argentina) Marco Trungelliti (Germany) Christoph Negritu
October 6	Open de Roanne; Roanne, France; Hard (i) – Challenger 100 – 32S/24Q/16D; Singles – Doubles	(Finland) Otto Virtanen; 6–1, 3–6, 6–3	(France) Hugo Gaston	(Croatia) Matej Dodig (France) Matteo Martineau	(Switzerland) Dominic Stricker (Norway) Nicolai Budkov Kjær (Switzerland) Mika Brunold (France) Calvin Hemery
October 6	Open de Roanne; Roanne, France; Hard (i) – Challenger 100 – 32S/24Q/16D; Singles – Doubles	(United States) Vasil Kirkov (Netherlands) Bart Stevens; 4–6, 6–1, [10–4]	(Belgium) Joran Vliegen (United States) Jackson Withrow	(Croatia) Matej Dodig (France) Matteo Martineau	(Switzerland) Dominic Stricker (Norway) Nicolai Budkov Kjær (Switzerland) Mika Brunold (France) Calvin Hemery
October 6	Cali Open; Cali, Colombia; Clay – Challenger 75 – 32S/24Q/16D; Singles – Doubles	(Chile) Tomás Barrios Vera; 6–1, 6–4	(Bolivia) Juan Carlos Prado Ángelo	(Argentina) Juan Bautista Torres (Peru) Gonzalo Bueno	(Brazil) Mateus Alves (Colombia) Nicolás Mejía (Peru) Juan Pablo Varillas (Chile) Matías Soto
October 6	Cali Open; Cali, Colombia; Clay – Challenger 75 – 32S/24Q/16D; Singles – Doubles	(Argentina) Federico Agustín Gómez (Venezuela) Luis David Martínez; 6–4, 6–4	(Argentina) Guido Iván Justo (Uruguay) Franco Roncadelli	(Argentina) Juan Bautista Torres (Peru) Gonzalo Bueno	(Brazil) Mateus Alves (Colombia) Nicolás Mejía (Peru) Juan Pablo Varillas (Chile) Matías Soto
October 6	Crete Challenger V Hersonissos, Greece; Hard – Challenger 50 – 32S/24Q/16D; Singles – Doubles	(United Kingdom) Ryan Peniston; 6–3, 7–5	(Belgium) Kimmer Coppejans	(Czech Republic) Hynek Bartoň (France) Antoine Escoffier	(Moldova) Radu Albot (United Kingdom) Harry Wendelken (Ivory Coast) Eliakim Coulibaly (Belgium) Michael Geerts
October 6	Crete Challenger V Hersonissos, Greece; Hard – Challenger 50 – 32S/24Q/16D; Singles – Doubles	(Spain) Alberto Barroso Campos (Spain) Iñaki Montes de la Torre; 7–5, 7–6^{(7–3)}	(Czech Republic) David Poljak (France) Max Westphal	(Czech Republic) Hynek Bartoň (France) Antoine Escoffier	(Moldova) Radu Albot (United Kingdom) Harry Wendelken (Ivory Coast) Eliakim Coulibaly (Belgium) Michael Geerts
October 6	Fairfield Challenger; Fairfield, United States; Hard – Challenger 50 – 32S/24Q/16D; Singles – Doubles	(Japan) Jay Dylan Friend; 6–7^{(3–7)}, 6–3, 6–2	(Australia) Edward Winter	(United States) Andre Ilagan (United States) Garrett Johns	(United States) Dominique Rolland (Jordan) Abdullah Shelbayh (Germany) Mats Rosenkranz (United States) Daniel Milavsky
October 6	Fairfield Challenger; Fairfield, United States; Hard – Challenger 50 – 32S/24Q/16D; Singles – Doubles	(Germany) Mats Rosenkranz (Germany) Max Wiskandt; 3–6, 7–5, [10–6]	(United States) Spencer Johnson (United States) Wally Thayne	(United States) Andre Ilagan (United States) Garrett Johns	(United States) Dominique Rolland (Jordan) Abdullah Shelbayh (Germany) Mats Rosenkranz (United States) Daniel Milavsky
October 13	Olbia Challenger; Olbia, Italy; Hard – Challenger 125 – 32S/24Q/16D; Singles – Doubles	(France) Luca Van Assche; 7–6^{(7–5)}, 6–7^{(1–7)}, 6–2	(Spain) Pablo Carreño Busta	(Spain) Martín Landaluce (France) Hugo Grenier	(Chile) Alejandro Tabilo (Serbia) Dušan Lajović (Bosnia and Herzegovina) Nerman Fatić (Lithuania) Edas Butvilas
October 13	Olbia Challenger; Olbia, Italy; Hard – Challenger 125 – 32S/24Q/16D; Singles – Doubles	(France) Arthur Reymond (France) Luca Sanchez; 6–4, 6–1	(Romania) Victor Vlad Cornea (Spain) Bruno Pujol Navarro	(Spain) Martín Landaluce (France) Hugo Grenier	(Chile) Alejandro Tabilo (Serbia) Dušan Lajović (Bosnia and Herzegovina) Nerman Fatić (Lithuania) Edas Butvilas
October 13	Curitiba Challenger; Curitiba, Brazil; Clay – Challenger 75 – 32S/24Q/16D; Singles – Doubles	(Paraguay) Daniel Vallejo; 6–3, 7–5	(Brazil) Pedro Boscardin Dias	(Brazil) João Eduardo Schiessl (Argentina) Román Andrés Burruchaga	(Chile) Tomás Barrios Vera (Brazil) Daniel Dutra da Silva (Peru) Gonzalo Bueno (Bolivia) Juan Carlos Prado Ángelo
October 13	Curitiba Challenger; Curitiba, Brazil; Clay – Challenger 75 – 32S/24Q/16D; Singles – Doubles	(Chile) Matías Soto (Bolivia) Federico Zeballos; 6–4, 7–5	(Ecuador) Gonzalo Escobar (Mexico) Miguel Ángel Reyes-Varela	(Brazil) João Eduardo Schiessl (Argentina) Román Andrés Burruchaga	(Chile) Tomás Barrios Vera (Brazil) Daniel Dutra da Silva (Peru) Gonzalo Bueno (Bolivia) Juan Carlos Prado Ángelo
October 13	Lincoln Challenger; Lincoln, United States; Hard (i) – Challenger 75 – 32S/24Q/16D; Singles – Doubles	(Spain) Rafael Jódar; 6–7^{(3–7)}, 6–3, 6–3	(United States) Martin Damm	(United States) Patrick Kypson (United Kingdom) Johannus Monday	(United States) Brandon Holt (India) Dhakshineswar Suresh (United States) Michael Mmoh (United States) Andre Ilagan
October 13	Lincoln Challenger; Lincoln, United States; Hard (i) – Challenger 75 – 32S/24Q/16D; Singles – Doubles	(Australia) Patrick Harper (United Kingdom) Johannus Monday; 6–4, 7–5	(India) Aryan Shah (India) Dhakshineswar Suresh	(United States) Patrick Kypson (United Kingdom) Johannus Monday	(United States) Brandon Holt (India) Dhakshineswar Suresh (United States) Michael Mmoh (United States) Andre Ilagan
October 13	Shenzhen Futian Open; Shenzhen, China; Hard – Challenger 75 – 32S/24Q/16D; Singles – Doubles	(France) Kyrian Jacquet; 6–3, 6–3	(China) Zhou Yi	(China) Cui Jie (Japan) Sho Shimabukuro	(China) Mo Yecong (China) Sun Fajing (Japan) Kaichi Uchida (France) Harold Mayot
October 13	Shenzhen Futian Open; Shenzhen, China; Hard – Challenger 75 – 32S/24Q/16D; Singles – Doubles	(United States) Nathaniel Lammons (Netherlands) Jean-Julien Rojer; 6–7^{(5–7)}, 7–5, [10–4]	(New Zealand) Finn Reynolds (New Zealand) James Watt	(China) Cui Jie (Japan) Sho Shimabukuro	(China) Mo Yecong (China) Sun Fajing (Japan) Kaichi Uchida (France) Harold Mayot
October 13	Crete Challenger VI; Hersonissos, Greece; Hard – Challenger 50 – 32S/24Q/16D; Singles – Doubles	(United Kingdom) Harry Wendelken; 6–4, 6–3	(Czech Republic) Maxim Mrva	(Bulgaria) Dimitar Kuzmanov (Spain) Iñaki Montes de la Torre	(United Kingdom) Giles Hussey (Moldova) Radu Albot (United Kingdom) Max Basing (Italy) Fabrizio Andaloro
October 13	Crete Challenger VI; Hersonissos, Greece; Hard – Challenger 50 – 32S/24Q/16D; Singles – Doubles	(United Kingdom) Giles Hussey (United Kingdom) Mark Whitehouse; 6–4, 4–6, [10–5]	(France) Geoffrey Blancaneaux (Belgium) Michael Geerts	(Bulgaria) Dimitar Kuzmanov (Spain) Iñaki Montes de la Torre	(United Kingdom) Giles Hussey (Moldova) Radu Albot (United Kingdom) Max Basing (Italy) Fabrizio Andaloro
October 20	Costa do Sauípe Open; Sauipe, Brazil; Clay – Challenger 125 – 32S/24Q/16D; Singles – Doubles	(Argentina) Román Andrés Burruchaga; 6–1, 6–2	(Paraguay) Daniel Vallejo	(Chile) Cristian Garín (Bolivia) Juan Carlos Prado Ángelo	(Argentina) Mariano Navone (Argentina) Thiago Agustín Tirante (United States) Emilio Nava (Argentina) Juan Manuel Cerúndolo
October 20	Costa do Sauípe Open; Sauipe, Brazil; Clay – Challenger 125 – 32S/24Q/16D; Singles – Doubles	(Brazil) Luís Miguel (Brazil) Eduardo Ribeiro; 7–6^{(7–4)}, 4–6, [10–5]	(Ecuador) Gonzalo Escobar (Mexico) Miguel Ángel Reyes-Varela	(Chile) Cristian Garín (Bolivia) Juan Carlos Prado Ángelo	(Argentina) Mariano Navone (Argentina) Thiago Agustín Tirante (United States) Emilio Nava (Argentina) Juan Manuel Cerúndolo
October 20	Brest Challenger; Brest, France; Hard (i) – Challenger 100 – 32S/24Q/16D; Singles – Doubles	(France) Hugo Gaston; 2–6, 6–2, 6–1	(United States) Eliot Spizzirri	(Italy) Francesco Passaro (Canada) Alexis Galarneau	(Italy) Giulio Zeppieri (France) Dan Added (United Kingdom) Arthur Fery (France) Clément Tabur
October 20	Brest Challenger; Brest, France; Hard (i) – Challenger 100 – 32S/24Q/16D; Singles – Doubles	(Belgium) Sander Gillé (Netherlands) Sem Verbeek; 7–6^{(7–5)}, 7–6^{(7–4)}	(France) Théo Arribagé (France) Albano Olivetti	(Italy) Francesco Passaro (Canada) Alexis Galarneau	(Italy) Giulio Zeppieri (France) Dan Added (United Kingdom) Arthur Fery (France) Clément Tabur
October 20	Sioux Falls Challenger; Sioux Falls, United States; Hard (i) – Challenger 100 – 32S/24Q/16D; Singles – Doubles	(United States) Patrick Kypson; 6–7^{(2–7)}, 7–6^{(7–4)}, 7–5	(United Kingdom) Johannus Monday	(Germany) Mats Rosenkranz (France) Antoine Ghibaudo	(Australia) Jordan Thompson (United States) Andres Martin (Australia) Rinky Hijikata (United States) Martin Damm
October 20	Sioux Falls Challenger; Sioux Falls, United States; Hard (i) – Challenger 100 – 32S/24Q/16D; Singles – Doubles	(Australia) Rinky Hijikata (United States) Mac Kiger; 6–4, 6–4	(Venezuela) Juan José Bianchi (United States) Andrew Fenty	(Germany) Mats Rosenkranz (France) Antoine Ghibaudo	(Australia) Jordan Thompson (United States) Andres Martin (Australia) Rinky Hijikata (United States) Martin Damm
October 20	China International Suzhou; Suzhou, China; Hard – Challenger 75 – 32S/24Q/16D; Singles – Doubles	(Japan) Yoshihito Nishioka; 6–4, 6–4	(France) Harold Mayot	(Croatia) Duje Ajduković (Chinese Taipei) Hsu Yu-hsiou	(Portugal) Frederico Ferreira Silva (South Africa) Lloyd Harris (Japan) Yuta Shimizu (Australia) James McCabe
October 20	China International Suzhou; Suzhou, China; Hard – Challenger 75 – 32S/24Q/16D; Singles – Doubles	(Australia) Blake Bayldon (Chinese Taipei) Ray Ho; 6–4, 6–3	(India) S D Prajwal Dev (India) Nitin Kumar Sinha	(Croatia) Duje Ajduković (Chinese Taipei) Hsu Yu-hsiou	(Portugal) Frederico Ferreira Silva (South Africa) Lloyd Harris (Japan) Yuta Shimizu (Australia) James McCabe
October 20	Hamburg Ladies & Gents Cup; Hamburg, Germany; Hard (i) – Challenger 50 – 32S/24Q/16D; Singles – Doubles	(Germany) Justin Engel; 7–5, 7–6^{(7–4)}	(Italy) Federico Cinà	(Spain) Alejandro Moro Cañas (United Kingdom) George Loffhagen	(Belgium) Buvaysar Gadamauri (Croatia) Matej Dodig (Germany) Henri Squire (Germany) Tom Gentzsch
October 20	Hamburg Ladies & Gents Cup; Hamburg, Germany; Hard (i) – Challenger 50 – 32S/24Q/16D; Singles – Doubles	(Belgium) Michael Geerts (Germany) Tim Rühl; 7–6^{(8–6)}, 7–5	(Slovakia) Miloš Karol (Finland) Patrik Niklas-Salminen	(Spain) Alejandro Moro Cañas (United Kingdom) George Loffhagen	(Belgium) Buvaysar Gadamauri (Croatia) Matej Dodig (Germany) Henri Squire (Germany) Tom Gentzsch
October 27	Slovak Open; Bratislava, Slovakia; Hard (i) – Challenger 125 – 32S/24Q/16D; Singles – Doubles	(Belgium) Alexander Blockx; 6–4, 6–3	(France) Titouan Droguet	(Belgium) Raphaël Collignon (Luxembourg) Chris Rodesch	(Estonia) Mark Lajal (Finland) Otto Virtanen (Italy) Francesco Maestrelli (United States) Eliot Spizzirri
October 27	Slovak Open; Bratislava, Slovakia; Hard (i) – Challenger 125 – 32S/24Q/16D; Singles – Doubles	(Belgium) Sander Gillé (Netherlands) Sem Verbeek; 7–6^{(7–3)}, 6–3	(United Kingdom) Joshua Paris (United Kingdom) Marcus Willis	(Belgium) Raphaël Collignon (Luxembourg) Chris Rodesch	(Estonia) Mark Lajal (Finland) Otto Virtanen (Italy) Francesco Maestrelli (United States) Eliot Spizzirri
October 27	Seoul Open Challenger; Seoul, South Korea; Hard – Challenger 100 – 32S/24Q/16D; Singles – Doubles	(Japan) Sho Shimabukuro; 6–4, 6–3	(Hong Kong) Coleman Wong	(Sweden) Elias Ymer (China) Zhou Yi	(Thailand) Kasidit Samrej (Austria) Jurij Rodionov (Portugal) Frederico Ferreira Silva (China) Bu Yunchaokete
October 27	Seoul Open Challenger; Seoul, South Korea; Hard – Challenger 100 – 32S/24Q/16D; Singles – Doubles	(United States) Nathaniel Lammons (Netherlands) Jean-Julien Rojer; 6–3, 6–4	(United States) George Goldhoff (United States) Theodore Winegar	(Sweden) Elias Ymer (China) Zhou Yi	(Thailand) Kasidit Samrej (Austria) Jurij Rodionov (Portugal) Frederico Ferreira Silva (China) Bu Yunchaokete
October 27	Charlottesville Men's Pro Challenger; Charlottesville, United States; Hard (i) – Challenger 75 – 32S/24Q/16D; Singles – Doubles	(Spain) Rafael Jódar; 6–3, 7–6^{(7–2)}	(United States) Martin Damm	(Germany) Mats Rosenkranz (United Kingdom) Johannus Monday	(United Kingdom) Oliver Tarvet (Estonia) Daniil Glinka (Switzerland) Dylan Dietrich (United States) Mitchell Krueger
October 27	Charlottesville Men's Pro Challenger; Charlottesville, United States; Hard (i) – Challenger 75 – 32S/24Q/16D; Singles – Doubles	(Germany) Tim Rühl (Germany) Patrick Zahraj; 3–6, 7–5, [12–10]	(Canada) Justin Boulais (United States) Mac Kiger	(Germany) Mats Rosenkranz (United Kingdom) Johannus Monday	(United Kingdom) Oliver Tarvet (Estonia) Daniil Glinka (Switzerland) Dylan Dietrich (United States) Mitchell Krueger
October 27	Los Inkas Open (Note: The Challenger Ciudad de Guayaquil was originally due to take place 27 October – 2 November but was relocated to Lima, Peru due to safety concerns. It was then later rescheduled for 17–23 November.); Lima, Peru; Clay – Challenger 75 – 32S/24Q/16D; Singles – Doubles	(Argentina) Mariano Navone; 6–4, 5–7, 6–4	(Italy) Marco Cecchinato	(Ecuador) Álvaro Guillén Meza (United States) Tristan Boyer	(Argentina) Alex Barrena (Peru) Ignacio Buse (Czech Republic) Zdeněk Kolář (Peru) Arklon Huertas del Pino
October 27	Los Inkas Open; Lima, Peru; Clay – Challenger 75 – 32S/24Q/16D; Singles – Doubles	(Ecuador) Gonzalo Escobar (Mexico) Miguel Ángel Reyes-Varela; 6–4, 6–4	(Argentina) Federico Agustín Gómez (Venezuela) Luis David Martínez	(Ecuador) Álvaro Guillén Meza (United States) Tristan Boyer	(Argentina) Alex Barrena (Peru) Ignacio Buse (Czech Republic) Zdeněk Kolář (Peru) Arklon Huertas del Pino
October 27	Monastir Open; Monastir, Tunisia; Hard – Challenger 50 – 32S/24Q/16D; Singles – Doubles	(Italy) Lorenzo Giustino; 7–5, 6–0	(Czech Republic) Petr Brunclík	(Spain) Alejandro Moro Cañas (France) Arthur Géa	(Croatia) Luka Mikrut (France) Dan Added (Switzerland) Rémy Bertola (Turkey) Mert Alkaya
October 27	Monastir Open; Monastir, Tunisia; Hard – Challenger 50 – 32S/24Q/16D; Singles – Doubles	(France) Corentin Denolly (France) Max Westphal; 7–5, 2–6, [10–6]	(Serbia) Stefan Latinović (Croatia) Luka Mikrut	(Spain) Alejandro Moro Cañas (France) Arthur Géa	(Croatia) Luka Mikrut (France) Dan Added (Switzerland) Rémy Bertola (Turkey) Mert Alkaya

=== November ===
Week of	Tournament	Champions	Runners-up	Semifinalists	Quarterfinalists
November 3	HPP Open; Helsinki, Finland; Hard (i) – Challenger 125 – 32S/24Q/16D; Singles – Doubles	(United States) Patrick Kypson; 4–6, 6–3, 6–4	(Finland) Otto Virtanen	(France) Sascha Gueymard Wayenburg (Italy) Stefano Travaglia	(Croatia) Marin Čilić (Italy) Giulio Zeppieri (Italy) Lorenzo Giustino (Italy) Luca Nardi
November 3	HPP Open; Helsinki, Finland; Hard (i) – Challenger 125 – 32S/24Q/16D; Singles – Doubles	(Germany) Jakob Schnaitter (Germany) Mark Wallner; 6–2, 4–6, [10–6]	(Romania) Alexandru Jecan (Romania) Bogdan Pavel	(France) Sascha Gueymard Wayenburg (Italy) Stefano Travaglia	(Croatia) Marin Čilić (Italy) Giulio Zeppieri (Italy) Lorenzo Giustino (Italy) Luca Nardi
November 3	Santaizi ATP Challenger; Taipei, Taiwan; Hard (i) – Challenger 100 – 32S/24Q/16D; Singles – Doubles	(Japan) Yoshihito Nishioka; 7–5, 7–6^{(7–5)}	(Australia) James Duckworth	(Hong Kong) Coleman Wong (Australia) James McCabe	(Japan) Kaichi Uchida (France) Maxime Janvier (Japan) Masamichi Imamura (Japan) Akira Santillan
November 3	Santaizi ATP Challenger; Taipei, Taiwan; Hard (i) – Challenger 100 – 32S/24Q/16D; Singles – Doubles	(United States) Nathaniel Lammons (Netherlands) Jean-Julien Rojer; 7–6^{(7–4)}, 7–6^{(8–6)}	(Japan) Kaito Uesugi (Japan) Seita Watanabe	(Hong Kong) Coleman Wong (Australia) James McCabe	(Japan) Kaichi Uchida (France) Maxime Janvier (Japan) Masamichi Imamura (Japan) Akira Santillan
November 3	Lima Challenger II; Lima, Peru; Clay – Challenger 75 – 32S/24Q/16D; Singles – Doubles	(Chile) Tomás Barrios Vera; 7–6^{(7–5)}, 7–6^{(7–3)}	(Brazil) João Lucas Reis da Silva	(Ecuador) Álvaro Guillén Meza (Peru) Gonzalo Bueno	(Argentina) Juan Bautista Torres (Argentina) Román Andrés Burruchaga (Chile) Cristian Garín (Argentina) Genaro Alberto Olivieri
November 3	Lima Challenger II; Lima, Peru; Clay – Challenger 75 – 32S/24Q/16D; Singles – Doubles	(Brazil) Marcelo Demoliner (Brazil) Orlando Luz; 2–6, 7–6^{(7–3)}, [10–8]	(Colombia) Cristian Rodríguez (Bolivia) Federico Zeballos	(Ecuador) Álvaro Guillén Meza (Peru) Gonzalo Bueno	(Argentina) Juan Bautista Torres (Argentina) Román Andrés Burruchaga (Chile) Cristian Garín (Argentina) Genaro Alberto Olivieri
November 3	Matsuyama Challenger; Matsuyama, Japan; Hard – Challenger 75 – 32S/24Q/16D; Singles – Doubles	(Portugal) Henrique Rocha; 7–5, 3–6, 6–2	(Japan) Sho Shimabukuro	(Portugal) Frederico Ferreira Silva (United Kingdom) Ryan Peniston	(Japan) Rio Noguchi (United Kingdom) Oliver Crawford (Croatia) Duje Ajduković (France) Hugo Grenier
November 3	Matsuyama Challenger; Matsuyama, Japan; Hard – Challenger 75 – 32S/24Q/16D; Singles – Doubles	(Switzerland) Marc-Andrea Hüsler (United States) Garrett Johns; 6–3, 6–4	(New Zealand) Finn Reynolds (New Zealand) James Watt	(Portugal) Frederico Ferreira Silva (United Kingdom) Ryan Peniston	(Japan) Rio Noguchi (United Kingdom) Oliver Crawford (Croatia) Duje Ajduković (France) Hugo Grenier
November 3	Knoxville Challenger; Knoxville, United States; Hard (i) – Challenger 50 – 32S/24Q/16D; Singles – Doubles	(United States) Mitchell Krueger; 6–7^{(2–7)}, 6–4, 6–1	(United States) Darwin Blanch	(Germany) Cedrik-Marcel Stebe (Estonia) Daniil Glinka	(Spain) Iñaki Montes de la Torre (United States) Murphy Cassone (Japan) Shunsuke Mitsui (United Kingdom) Jay Clarke
November 3	Knoxville Challenger; Knoxville, United States; Hard (i) – Challenger 50 – 32S/24Q/16D; Singles – Doubles	(Australia) Patrick Harper (United States) Quinn Vandecasteele; 6–7^{(6–8)}, 7–6^{(7–4)}, [12–10]	(United States) Mitchell Krueger (Antigua and Barbuda) Jody Maginley	(Germany) Cedrik-Marcel Stebe (Estonia) Daniil Glinka	(Spain) Iñaki Montes de la Torre (United States) Murphy Cassone (Japan) Shunsuke Mitsui (United Kingdom) Jay Clarke
November 10	Uruguay Open; Montevideo, Uruguay; Clay – Challenger 100 – 32S/24Q/16D; Singles – Doubles	(Chile) Cristian Garín; 6–7^{(3–7)}, 6–2, 6–2	(Peru) Ignacio Buse	(Chile) Tomás Barrios Vera (Argentina) Román Andrés Burruchaga	(Paraguay) Daniel Vallejo (Spain) Carlos Taberner (Brazil) Gustavo Heide (Argentina) Mariano Navone
November 10	Uruguay Open; Montevideo, Uruguay; Clay – Challenger 100 – 32S/24Q/16D; Singles – Doubles	(Argentina) Facundo Mena (Mexico) Rodrigo Pacheco Méndez; 3–6, 6–3, [11–9]	(Ecuador) Gonzalo Escobar (Mexico) Miguel Ángel Reyes-Varela	(Chile) Tomás Barrios Vera (Argentina) Román Andrés Burruchaga	(Paraguay) Daniel Vallejo (Spain) Carlos Taberner (Brazil) Gustavo Heide (Argentina) Mariano Navone
November 10	Queensland International III; Brisbane, Australia; Hard – Challenger 75 – 32S/24Q/16D; Singles – Doubles	(Australia) Alex Bolt; 6–3, 6–3	(Chinese Taipei) Wu Tung-lin	(Australia) Dane Sweeny (Japan) Hayato Matsuoka	(Australia) James Duckworth (Australia) Bernard Tomic (Denmark) Carl Emil Overbeck (Australia) Jake Delaney
November 10	Queensland International III; Brisbane, Australia; Hard – Challenger 75 – 32S/24Q/16D; Singles – Doubles	(Australia) Matt Hulme (Australia) Kody Pearson; 7–6^{(7–5)}, 3–6, [10–6]	(India) Anirudh Chandrasekar (United States) Reese Stalder	(Australia) Dane Sweeny (Japan) Hayato Matsuoka	(Australia) James Duckworth (Australia) Bernard Tomic (Denmark) Carl Emil Overbeck (Australia) Jake Delaney
November 10	Champaign Challenger; Champaign, United States; Hard (i) – Challenger 75 – 32S/24Q/16D; Singles – Doubles	(United States) Stefan Kozlov; 7–6^{(7–3)}, 7–5	(United States) Murphy Cassone	(Germany) Cedrik-Marcel Stebe (Japan) Kenta Miyoshi	(Spain) Àlex Martínez (United States) Darwin Blanch (Germany) Mats Rosenkranz (Germany) Taym Al Azmeh
November 10	Champaign Challenger; Champaign, United States; Hard (i) – Challenger 75 – 32S/24Q/16D; Singles – Doubles	(Australia) Patrick Harper (Japan) Shunsuke Mitsui; 7–5, 6–7^{(3–7)}, [12–10]	(United States) Ryan Seggerman (United States) Keegan Smith	(Germany) Cedrik-Marcel Stebe (Japan) Kenta Miyoshi	(Spain) Àlex Martínez (United States) Darwin Blanch (Germany) Mats Rosenkranz (Germany) Taym Al Azmeh
November 10	Challenger Banque Nationale de Drummondville; Drummondville, Canada; Hard (i) – Challenger 75 – 32S/24Q/16D; Singles – Doubles	(Estonia) Daniil Glinka; 6–4, 6–2	(Canada) Duncan Chan	(Poland) Maks Kaśnikowski (United Kingdom) Charles Broom	(Canada) Liam Draxl (Canada) Dan Martin (Germany) Louis Wessels (Romania) Gabi Adrian Boitan
November 10	Challenger Banque Nationale de Drummondville; Drummondville, Canada; Hard (i) – Challenger 75 – 32S/24Q/16D; Singles – Doubles	(United States) Trey Hilderbrand (United States) Mac Kiger; 6–3, 6–4	(Mexico) Alan Magadán (United States) Karl Poling	(Poland) Maks Kaśnikowski (United Kingdom) Charles Broom	(Canada) Liam Draxl (Canada) Dan Martin (Germany) Louis Wessels (Romania) Gabi Adrian Boitan
November 10	Kobe Challenger; Kobe, Japan; Hard (i) – Challenger 75 – 32S/24Q/16D; Singles – Doubles	(Japan) Yosuke Watanuki; 3–6, 6–1, 6–4	(Sweden) Elias Ymer	(Chinese Taipei) Tseng Chun-hsin (Japan) Kaichi Uchida	(Japan) Rei Sakamoto (France) Hugo Grenier (Japan) Sho Shimabukuro (Switzerland) Marc-Andrea Hüsler
November 10	Kobe Challenger; Kobe, Japan; Hard (i) – Challenger 75 – 32S/24Q/16D; Singles – Doubles	(Austria) Neil Oberleitner (Czech Republic) Michael Vrbenský; 6–7^{(1–7)}, 7–6^{(10–8)}, [10–4]	(Thailand) Pruchya Isaro (India) Niki Kaliyanda Poonacha	(Chinese Taipei) Tseng Chun-hsin (Japan) Kaichi Uchida	(Japan) Rei Sakamoto (France) Hugo Grenier (Japan) Sho Shimabukuro (Switzerland) Marc-Andrea Hüsler
November 10	All In Open; Lyon, France; Hard (i) – Challenger 75 – 32S/24Q/16D; Singles – Doubles	(Germany) Jan-Lennard Struff; 6–4, 6–4	(United Kingdom) Liam Broady	(France) Tom Paris (France) Dan Added	(Kazakhstan) Mikhail Kukushkin (Croatia) Matej Dodig (France) Kyrian Jacquet (Czech Republic) Vít Kopřiva
November 10	All In Open; Lyon, France; Hard (i) – Challenger 75 – 32S/24Q/16D; Singles – Doubles	(Ecuador) Diego Hidalgo (United States) Patrik Trhac; 6–3, 6–4	(India) Sriram Balaji (Germany) Hendrik Jebens	(France) Tom Paris (France) Dan Added	(Kazakhstan) Mikhail Kukushkin (Croatia) Matej Dodig (France) Kyrian Jacquet (Czech Republic) Vít Kopřiva
November 17	Trofeo Faip–Perrel; Bergamo, Italy; Hard (i) – Challenger 100 – 32S/24Q/16D; Singles – Doubles	(Italy) Francesco Maestrelli; 6–3, 3–6, 6–1	(Germany) Marko Topo	(Italy) Stefano Travaglia (Germany) Justin Engel	(Italy) Federico Arnaboldi (Italy) Francesco Passaro (Italy) Stefano Napolitano (Italy) Andrea Guerrieri
November 17	Trofeo Faip–Perrel; Bergamo, Italy; Hard (i) – Challenger 100 – 32S/24Q/16D; Singles – Doubles	(United Kingdom) Joshua Paris (United Kingdom) Marcus Willis; 7–6^{(7–3)}, 6–4	(Czech Republic) David Poljak (Germany) Tim Rühl	(Italy) Stefano Travaglia (Germany) Justin Engel	(Italy) Federico Arnaboldi (Italy) Francesco Passaro (Italy) Stefano Napolitano (Italy) Andrea Guerrieri
November 17	Engie Open Florianópolis; Florianópolis, Brazil; Clay – Challenger 75 – 32S/24Q/16D; Singles – Doubles	(Brazil) Gustavo Heide; 6–2, 6–3	(Argentina) Andrea Collarini	(Brazil) Daniel Dutra da Silva (Bolivia) Juan Carlos Prado Ángelo	(Argentina) Guido Iván Justo (Argentina) Nicolás Kicker (Brazil) Eduardo Ribeiro (Brazil) Pedro Sakamoto
November 17	Engie Open Florianópolis; Florianópolis, Brazil; Clay – Challenger 75 – 32S/24Q/16D; Singles – Doubles	(Bolivia) Boris Arias (Denmark) Johannes Ingildsen; 3–6, 6–3, [10–8]	(Peru) Alexander Merino (Germany) Christoph Negritu	(Brazil) Daniel Dutra da Silva (Bolivia) Juan Carlos Prado Ángelo	(Argentina) Guido Iván Justo (Argentina) Nicolás Kicker (Brazil) Eduardo Ribeiro (Brazil) Pedro Sakamoto
November 17	Challenger Ciudad de Guayaquil; Guayaquil, Ecuador; Clay – Challenger 75 – 32S/24Q/16D; Singles – Doubles	(Paraguay) Daniel Vallejo; 7–5, 6–7^{(7–9)}, 6–3	(Peru) Juan Pablo Varillas	(Argentina) Federico Agustín Gómez (Ecuador) Álvaro Guillén Meza	(Ecuador) Andrés Andrade (Lebanon) Hady Habib (Argentina) Facundo Mena (Argentina) Luciano Emanuel Ambrogi
November 17	Challenger Ciudad de Guayaquil; Guayaquil, Ecuador; Clay – Challenger 75 – 32S/24Q/16D; Singles – Doubles	(Mexico) Alex Hernández (Mexico) Rodrigo Pacheco Méndez; 7–5, 6–3	(Argentina) Lucio Ratti (Brazil) Victor Hugo Remondy Pagotto	(Argentina) Federico Agustín Gómez (Ecuador) Álvaro Guillén Meza	(Ecuador) Andrés Andrade (Lebanon) Hady Habib (Argentina) Facundo Mena (Argentina) Luciano Emanuel Ambrogi
November 17	Montemar Challenger; Alicante, Spain; Clay – Challenger 75 – 32S/24Q/16D; Singles – Doubles	(Czech Republic) Zdeněk Kolář; 6–4, 6–4	(Italy) Gianluca Cadenasso	(Italy) Lorenzo Giustino (Argentina) Marco Trungelliti	Ivan Gakhov (Italy) Gabriele Piraino (Denmark) Elmer Møller (Bosnia and Herzegovina) Andrej Nedić
November 17	Montemar Challenger; Alicante, Spain; Clay – Challenger 75 – 32S/24Q/16D; Singles – Doubles	(Sweden) Erik Grevelius (Sweden) Adam Heinonen; 6–3, 6–3	(Italy) Federico Bondioli (Italy) Gianluca Cadenasso	(Italy) Lorenzo Giustino (Argentina) Marco Trungelliti	Ivan Gakhov (Italy) Gabriele Piraino (Denmark) Elmer Møller (Bosnia and Herzegovina) Andrej Nedić
November 17	Keio Challenger; Yokohama, Japan; Hard – Challenger 75 – 32S/24Q/16D; Singles – Doubles	(Japan) Rei Sakamoto; 4–6, 7–6^{(7–4)}, 6–4	(Japan) Kaichi Uchida	(Brazil) Igor Marcondes (Japan) Akira Santillan	(Japan) Kei Nishikori (Austria) Neil Oberleitner (Japan) Yusuke Kusuhara (Japan) Yasutaka Uchiyama
November 17	Keio Challenger; Yokohama, Japan; Hard – Challenger 75 – 32S/24Q/16D; Singles – Doubles	(Austria) Neil Oberleitner (Czech Republic) Michael Vrbenský; 7–6^{(8–6)}, 6–1	(Japan) Masamichi Imamura (Japan) Ryuki Matsuda	(Brazil) Igor Marcondes (Japan) Akira Santillan	(Japan) Kei Nishikori (Austria) Neil Oberleitner (Japan) Yusuke Kusuhara (Japan) Yasutaka Uchiyama
November 17	NSW Open; Sydney, Australia; Hard – Challenger 75 – 32S/24Q/16D; Singles – Doubles	(Australia) James Duckworth; 6–1, 6–4	(Japan) Hayato Matsuoka	(Australia) Jason Kubler (Australia) James McCabe	(Australia) Dane Sweeny (Australia) Alex Bolt (Australia) Tai Sach (Australia) Rinky Hijikata
November 17	NSW Open; Sydney, Australia; Hard – Challenger 75 – 32S/24Q/16D; Singles – Doubles	(Australia) Rinky Hijikata (Australia) Marc Polmans; 6–0, 6–4	(Australia) Calum Puttergill (Australia) Dane Sweeny	(Australia) Jason Kubler (Australia) James McCabe	(Australia) Dane Sweeny (Australia) Alex Bolt (Australia) Tai Sach (Australia) Rinky Hijikata
November 17	Soma Bay Open; Soma Bay, Egypt; Hard – Challenger 50 – 32S/24Q/16D; Singles – Doubles	(United Kingdom) Toby Samuel; 4–6, 7–6^{(7–4)}, 6–0	(United Kingdom) Jay Clarke	(France) Mathys Erhard (United Kingdom) Charlie Robertson	(Moldova) Radu Albot (Czech Republic) Maxim Mrva (Netherlands) Jelle Sels (Italy) Alexandr Binda
November 17	Soma Bay Open; Soma Bay, Egypt; Hard – Challenger 50 – 32S/24Q/16D; Singles – Doubles	Sergey Betov; Daniil Ostapenkov; 6–4, 6–2	(Egypt) Michael Bassem Sobhy (Egypt) Fares Zakaria	(France) Mathys Erhard (United Kingdom) Charlie Robertson	(Moldova) Radu Albot (Czech Republic) Maxim Mrva (Netherlands) Jelle Sels (Italy) Alexandr Binda
November 24	Maia Challenger; Maia, Portugal; Clay (i) – Challenger 100 – 32S/24Q/16D; Singles – Doubles	(Denmark) Elmer Møller; 6–4, 6–1	(Slovakia) Andrej Martin	(Spain) Daniel Mérida (France) Lilian Marmousez	(United Kingdom) Jan Choinski (Spain) Carlos López Montagud; Alexey Vatutin (Romania) Filip Cristian Jianu
November 24	Maia Challenger; Maia, Portugal; Clay (i) – Challenger 100 – 32S/24Q/16D; Singles – Doubles	(Bulgaria) Alexander Donski (Portugal) Tiago Pereira; 6–2, 7–6^{(8–6)}	(France) Théo Arribagé (Croatia) Nino Serdarušić	(Spain) Daniel Mérida (France) Lilian Marmousez	(United Kingdom) Jan Choinski (Spain) Carlos López Montagud; Alexey Vatutin (Romania) Filip Cristian Jianu
November 24	Challenger Temuco; Temuco, Chile; Hard – Challenger 100 – 32S/24Q/16D; Singles – Doubles	(Argentina) Federico Agustín Gómez; 6–4, 6–1	(Argentina) Lautaro Midón	(United States) Alafia Ayeni (Bolivia) Juan Carlos Prado Ángelo	(Argentina) Juan Manuel Cerúndolo (Argentina) Facundo Díaz Acosta (United States) Matt Kuhar (Argentina) Juan Manuel La Serna
November 24	Challenger Temuco; Temuco, Chile; Hard – Challenger 100 – 32S/24Q/16D; Singles – Doubles	(United States) Alafia Ayeni (United States) Daniel Milavsky; 6–7^{(6–8)}, 6–4, [10–6]	(Canada) Juan Carlos Aguilar (Bolivia) Federico Zeballos	(United States) Alafia Ayeni (Bolivia) Juan Carlos Prado Ángelo	(Argentina) Juan Manuel Cerúndolo (Argentina) Facundo Díaz Acosta (United States) Matt Kuhar (Argentina) Juan Manuel La Serna
November 24	Challenger Seguros del Estado; Bogotá, Colombia; Clay – Challenger 75 – 32S/24Q/16D; Singles – Doubles	(Colombia) Nicolás Mejía; 6–4, 6–4	(Colombia) Juan Sebastián Gómez	(Argentina) Juan Pablo Ficovich (Argentina) Facundo Mena	(Colombia) Nicolás Barrientos (United States) Stefan Kozlov (Bolivia) Murkel Dellien (Peru) Juan Pablo Varillas
November 24	Challenger Seguros del Estado; Bogotá, Colombia; Clay – Challenger 75 – 32S/24Q/16D; Singles – Doubles	(Venezuela) Luis David Martínez (Colombia) Cristian Rodríguez; 6–1, 6–4	(Colombia) Nicolás Barrientos (United States) Benjamin Kittay	(Argentina) Juan Pablo Ficovich (Argentina) Facundo Mena	(Colombia) Nicolás Barrientos (United States) Stefan Kozlov (Bolivia) Murkel Dellien (Peru) Juan Pablo Varillas
November 24	City of Playford Tennis International; Playford, Australia; Hard – Challenger 75 – 32S/24Q/16D; Singles – Doubles	(Australia) Rinky Hijikata; 6–0, 6–7^{(8–10)}, 6–4	(Australia) Dane Sweeny	(Australia) James Duckworth (Australia) Alex Bolt	(Japan) Rio Noguchi (Australia) Philip Sekulic (Denmark) Carl Emil Overbeck (Australia) James McCabe
November 24	City of Playford Tennis International; Playford, Australia; Hard – Challenger 75 – 32S/24Q/16D; Singles – Doubles	(Australia) Jake Delaney (Australia) Li Tu; 6–7^{(5–7)}, 7–5, [10–8]	(India) Anirudh Chandrasekar (United States) Reese Stalder	(Australia) James Duckworth (Australia) Alex Bolt	(Japan) Rio Noguchi (Australia) Philip Sekulic (Denmark) Carl Emil Overbeck (Australia) James McCabe
November 24	Athens Challenger; Athens, Greece; Hard – Challenger 50 – 32S/24Q/16D; Singles – Doubles	(Belgium) Michael Geerts; 7–5, 4–6, 6–2	(United Kingdom) Arthur Fery	(Spain) Alberto Barroso Campos (Austria) Sandro Kopp	(Ivory Coast) Eliakim Coulibaly (Spain) Sergio Callejón Hernando; Nikolay Vylegzhanin (South Africa) Philip Henning
November 24	Athens Challenger; Athens, Greece; Hard – Challenger 50 – 32S/24Q/16D; Singles – Doubles	(Spain) Alberto Barroso Campos (Belgium) Michael Geerts; 6–3, 3–6, [10–6]	(Switzerland) Andrin Casanova (Switzerland) Nicolás Parizzia	(Spain) Alberto Barroso Campos (Austria) Sandro Kopp	(Ivory Coast) Eliakim Coulibaly (Spain) Sergio Callejón Hernando; Nikolay Vylegzhanin (South Africa) Philip Henning
November 24	Islamabad Challenger; Islamabad, Pakistan; Hard – Challenger 50 – 32S/24Q/16D; Singles – Doubles	(United Kingdom) Jay Clarke; 6–3, 6–1	(Turkey) Mert Alkaya	(Kazakhstan) Denis Yevseyev (United Kingdom) Zach Stephens	(Sweden) Elias Ymer (Switzerland) Johan Nikles (Czech Republic) Dominik Palán (Ukraine) Vadym Ursu
November 24	Islamabad Challenger; Islamabad, Pakistan; Hard – Challenger 50 – 32S/24Q/16D; Singles – Doubles	(Czech Republic) Dominik Palán (Kazakhstan) Denis Yevseyev; 7–6^{(7–3)}, 6–4	(Pakistan) Muzammil Murtaza (Pakistan) Aisam-ul-Haq Qureshi	(Kazakhstan) Denis Yevseyev (United Kingdom) Zach Stephens	(Sweden) Elias Ymer (Switzerland) Johan Nikles (Czech Republic) Dominik Palán (Ukraine) Vadym Ursu
November 24	Manama Challenger; Manama, Bahrain; Hard – Challenger 50 – 32S/24Q/16D; Singles – Doubles	(United Kingdom) Toby Samuel; 6–0, 6–2	Ilia Simakin	(France) Matisse Bobichon (Czech Republic) Petr Brunclík	(Uzbekistan) Sergey Fomin (Switzerland) Alexander Ritschard (Bosnia and Herzegovina) Mirza Bašić (Spain) Iván Marrero Curbelo
November 24	Manama Challenger; Manama, Bahrain; Hard – Challenger 50 – 32S/24Q/16D; Singles – Doubles	Petr Bar Biryukov (Italy) Alexandr Binda; 7–5, 6–1	Egor Agafonov; Ilia Simakin	(France) Matisse Bobichon (Czech Republic) Petr Brunclík	(Uzbekistan) Sergey Fomin (Switzerland) Alexander Ritschard (Bosnia and Herzegovina) Mirza Bašić (Spain) Iván Marrero Curbelo

== Cancelled tournaments ==
The following tournaments were formally announced by the ATP before being cancelled.

Week of	Tournament
January 20	BW Open; Ottignies-Louvain-la-Neuve, Belgium; Hard (i) – Challenger 125
March 24	Querétaro Challenger; Querétaro, Mexico; Hard – Challenger 125
March 24	Hamilton Challenger; Hamilton, Bermuda; Clay – Challenger 75
September 15	Sibiu Open; Sibiu, Romania; Clay – Challenger 50

== Statistical information ==
These tables present the number of singles (S) and doubles (D) titles won by each player and each nation during the season. The players/nations are sorted by: 1) total number of titles (a doubles title won by two players representing the same nation counts as only one win for the nation); 2) a singles > doubles hierarchy; 3) alphabetical order (by family names for players).

The ATP announced in March 2022 that players representing Russia or Belarus would not be able to compete under their respective country's flag due to the 2022 Russian invasion of Ukraine. These players competed under no nationality, and any titles won by these players weren't counted towards a country's tally of total titles.

=== Titles won by player ===
Total	Player	S	D	S	D
8	Ray Ho (TPE)		● ● ● ● ● ● ● ●	0	8
8	Neil Oberleitner (AUT)		● ● ● ● ● ● ● ●	0	8
7	Vasil Kirkov (USA)		● ● ● ● ● ● ●	0	7
7	Michael Vrbenský (CZE)		● ● ● ● ● ● ●	0	7
6	Mariano Kestelboim (ARG)		● ● ● ● ● ●	0	6
6	Matthew Romios (AUS)		● ● ● ● ● ●	0	6
6	Ryan Seggerman (USA)		● ● ● ● ● ●	0	6
5	Marcelo Demoliner (BRA)		● ● ● ● ●	0	5
5	Patrick Harper (AUS)		● ● ● ● ●	0	5
5	Orlando Luz (BRA)		● ● ● ● ●	0	5
5	Luis David Martínez (VEN)		● ● ● ● ●	0	5
5	Finn Reynolds (NZL)		● ● ● ● ●	0	5
5	Matías Soto (CHI)		● ● ● ● ●	0	5
5	Gonzalo Villanueva (ARG)		● ● ● ● ●	0	5
5	James Watt (NZL)		● ● ● ● ●	0	5
5	Federico Zeballos (BOL)		● ● ● ● ●	0	5
4	Nicolai Budkov Kjær (NOR)	● ● ● ●		4	0
4	Jan Choinski (GBR)	● ● ● ●		4	0
4	Borna Ćorić (CRO)	● ● ● ●		4	0
4	Cristian Garín (CHI)	● ● ● ●		4	0
4	Patrick Kypson (USA)	● ● ● ●		4	0
4	Emilio Nava (USA)	● ● ● ●		4	0
4	Zdeněk Kolář (CZE)	● ●	● ●	2	2
4	Eliot Spizzirri (USA)	● ●	● ●	2	2
4	Michael Geerts (BEL)	●	● ● ●	1	3
4	Federico Agustín Gómez (ARG)	●	● ● ●	1	3
4	Rio Noguchi (JPN)	●	● ● ●	1	3
4	Robert Cash (USA)		● ● ● ●	0	4
4	Anirudh Chandrasekar (IND)		● ● ● ●	0	4
4	Gonzalo Escobar (ECU)		● ● ● ●	0	4
4	Diego Hidalgo (ECU)		● ● ● ●	0	4
4	Mac Kiger (USA)		● ● ● ●	0	4
4	Jakub Paul (SUI)		● ● ● ●	0	4
4	Andrew Paulson (CZE)		● ● ● ●	0	4
4	David Pichler (AUT)		● ● ● ●	0	4
4	Jean-Julien Rojer (NED)		● ● ● ●	0	4
4	Nino Serdarušić (CRO)		● ● ● ●	0	4
4	Bart Stevens (NED)		● ● ● ●	0	4
4	JJ Tracy (USA)		● ● ● ●	0	4
4	Matěj Vocel (CZE)		● ● ● ●	0	4
3	Tomás Barrios Vera (CHI)	● ● ●		3	0
3	Román Andrés Burruchaga (ARG)	● ● ●		3	0
3	Pablo Carreño Busta (ESP)	● ● ●		3	0
3	Moez Echargui (TUN)	● ● ●		3	0
3	Kyrian Jacquet (FRA)	● ● ●		3	0
3	Rafael Jódar (ESP)	● ● ●		3	0
3	Francesco Maestrelli (ITA)	● ● ●		3	0
3	Elmer Møller (DEN)	● ● ●		3	0
3	Dalibor Svrčina (CZE)	● ● ●		3	0
3	Marco Trungelliti (ARG)	● ● ●		3	0
3	Michael Zheng (USA)	● ● ●		3	0
3	Matej Dodig (CRO)	●	● ●	1	2
3	Liam Draxl (CAN)	●	● ●	1	2
3	Rinky Hijikata (AUS)	●	● ●	1	2
3	Juan Carlos Prado Ángelo (BOL)	●	● ●	1	2
3	Santiago Rodríguez Taverna (ARG)	●	● ●	1	2
3	Alberto Barroso Campos (ESP)		● ● ●	0	3
3	Karol Drzewiecki (POL)		● ● ●	0	3
3	Sander Gillé (BEL)		● ● ●	0	3
3	Santiago González (MEX)		● ● ●	0	3
3	Cleeve Harper (CAN)		● ● ●	0	3
3	Trey Hilderbrand (USA)		● ● ●	0	3
3	Szymon Kielan (POL)		● ● ●	0	3
3	Nathaniel Lammons (USA)		● ● ●	0	3
3	Christoph Negritu (GER)		● ● ●	0	3
3	Rodrigo Pacheco Méndez (MEX)		● ● ●	0	3
3	David Pel (NED)		● ● ●	0	3
3	Filip Pieczonka (POL)		● ● ●	0	3
3	Tim Rühl (GER)		● ● ●	0	3
3	Patrik Trhac (USA)		● ● ●	0	3
3	Sem Verbeek (NED)		● ● ●	0	3
2	Térence Atmane (FRA)	● ●		2	0
2	Alex Barrena (ARG)	● ●		2	0
2	Alexander Blockx (BEL)	● ●		2	0
2	Ignacio Buse (PER)	● ●		2	0
2	Marin Čilić (CRO)	● ●		2	0
2	Jay Clarke (GBR)	● ●		2	0
2	Raphaël Collignon (BEL)	● ●		2	0
2	James Duckworth (AUS)	● ●		2	0
2	João Fonseca (BRA)	● ●		2	0
2	Daniel Elahi Galán (COL)	● ●		2	0
2	Hugo Gaston (FRA)	● ●		2	0
2	Vilius Gaubas (LTU)	● ●		2	0
2	Brandon Holt (USA)	● ●		2	0
2	Lukáš Klein (SVK)	● ●		2	0
2	Aleksandar Kovacevic (USA)	● ●		2	0
2	Kamil Majchrzak (POL)	● ●		2	0
2	Nicolás Mejía (COL)	● ●		2	0
2	Felipe Meligeni Alves (BRA)	● ●		2	0
2	Luka Mikrut (CRO)	● ●		2	0
2	Filip Misolic (AUT)	● ●		2	0
2	Alex Molčan (SVK)	● ●		2	0
2	Mariano Navone (ARG)	● ●		2	0
2	Yoshihito Nishioka (JPN)	● ●		2	0
2	Jack Pinnington Jones (GBR)	● ●		2	0
2	Zsombor Piros (HUN)	● ●		2	0
2	Dino Prižmić (CRO)	● ●		2	0
2	Valentin Royer (FRA)	● ●		2	0
2	Rei Sakamoto (JPN)	● ●		2	0
2	Toby Samuel (GBR)	● ●		2	0
2	Tristan Schoolkate (AUS)	● ●		2	0
2	Sho Shimabukuro (JPN)	● ●		2	0
2	Zachary Svajda (USA)	● ●		2	0
2	Carlos Taberner (ESP)	● ●		2	0
2	Thiago Agustín Tirante (ARG)	● ●		2	0
2	Daniel Vallejo (PAR)	● ●		2	0
2	Otto Virtanen (FIN)	● ●		2	0
2	Clément Chidekh (FRA)	●	●	1	1
2	Gustavo Heide (BRA)	●	●	1	1
2	Marc-Andrea Hüsler (SUI)	●	●	1	1
2	Shintaro Mochizuki (JPN)	●	●	1	1
2	João Lucas Reis da Silva (BRA)	●	●	1	1
2	Daniel Rincón (ESP)	●	●	1	1
2	Jurij Rodionov (AUT)	●	●	1	1
2	Sun Fajing (CHN)	●	●	1	1
2	Stefano Travaglia (ITA)	●	●	1	1
2	Harry Wendelken (GBR)	●	●	1	1
2	Boris Arias (BOL)		● ●	0	2
2	Blake Bayldon (AUS)		● ●	0	2
2	Ariel Behar (URU)		● ●	0	2
2	Francisco Cabral (POR)		● ●	0	2
2	Alexander Donski (BUL)		● ●	0	2
2	Sadio Doumbia (FRA)		● ●	0	2
2	Guillermo Durán (ARG)		● ●	0	2
2	Jonáš Forejtek (CZE)		● ●	0	2
2	George Goldhoff (USA)		● ●	0	2
2	Erik Grevelius (SWE)		● ●	0	2
2	Adam Heinonen (SWE)		● ●	0	2
2	Hsu Yu-hsiou (TPE)		● ●	0	2
2	Matt Hulme (AUS)		● ●	0	2
2	Masamichi Imamura (JPN)		● ●	0	2
2	Kokoro Isomura (JPN)		● ●	0	2
2	Grégoire Jacq (FRA)		● ●	0	2
2	Benjamin Kittay (USA)		● ●	0	2
2	Austin Krajicek (USA)		● ●	0	2
2	Stefan Latinović (SRB)		● ●	0	2
2	Thijmen Loof (NED)		● ●	0	2
2	Sergio Martos Gornés (ESP)		● ●	0	2
2	Daniel Masur (GER)		● ●	0	2
2	Piotr Matuszewski (POL)		● ●	0	2
2	Facundo Mena (ARG)		● ●	0	2
2	Alexander Merino (PER)		● ●	0	2
2	Lucas Miedler (AUT)		● ●	0	2
2	Denys Molchanov (UKR)		● ●	0	2
2	Johannus Monday (GBR)		● ●	0	2
2	Iñaki Montes de la Torre (ESP)		● ●	0	2
2	Albano Olivetti (FRA)		● ●	0	2
2	Vladyslav Orlov (UKR)		● ●	0	2
2	Joshua Paris (GBR)		● ●	0	2
2	Mili Poljičak (CRO)		● ●	0	2
2	Vijay Sundar Prashanth (IND)		● ●	0	2
2	Miguel Ángel Reyes-Varela (MEX)		● ●	0	2
2	Arthur Reymond (FRA)		● ●	0	2
2	Cristian Rodríguez (COL)		● ●	0	2
2	Filippo Romano (ITA)		● ●	0	2
2	Mats Rosenkranz (GER)		● ●	0	2
2	Vitaliy Sachko (UKR)		● ●	0	2
2	Luca Sanchez (FRA)		● ●	0	2
2	Jakob Schnaitter (GER)		● ●	0	2
2	Colin Sinclair (NMI)		● ●	0	2
2	David Vega Hernández (ESP)		● ●	0	2
2	Mick Veldheer (NED)		● ●	0	2
2	Joran Vliegen (BEL)		● ●	0	2
2	Mark Wallner (GER)		● ●	0	2
2	Mark Whitehouse (GBR)		● ●	0	2
2	Marcus Willis (GBR)		● ●	0	2
1	Franco Agamenone (ITA)	●		1	0
1	Mattia Bellucci (ITA)	●		1	0
1	Geoffrey Blancaneaux (FRA)	●		1	0
1	Ugo Blanchet (FRA)	●		1	0
1	Alex Bolt (AUS)	●		1	0
1	Arthur Bouquier (FRA)	●		1	0
1	Alexander Bublik (KAZ)	●		1	0
1	Gonzalo Bueno (PER)	●		1	0
1	Edas Butvilas (LTU)	●		1	0
1	Arthur Cazaux (FRA)	●		1	0
1	Marco Cecchinato (ITA)	●		1	0
1	Juan Manuel Cerúndolo (ARG)	●		1	0
1	Eliakim Coulibaly (CIV)	●		1	0
1	Luciano Darderi (ITA)	●		1	0
1	Hugo Dellien (BOL)	●		1	0
1	Guy den Ouden (NED)	●		1	0
1	Titouan Droguet (FRA)	●		1	0
1	Viktor Durasovic (NOR)	●		1	0
1	Justin Engel (GER)	●		1	0
1	Arthur Fery (GBR)	●		1	0
1	Jay Dylan Friend (JPN)	●		1	0
1	Márton Fucsovics (HUN)	●		1	0
1	Matteo Gigante (ITA)	●		1	0
1	Lorenzo Giustino (ITA)	●		1	0
1	Daniil Glinka (EST)	●		1	0
1	Sascha Gueymard Wayenburg (FRA)	●		1	0
1	Álvaro Guillén Meza (ECU)	●		1	0
1	Yannick Hanfmann (GER)	●		1	0
1	Billy Harris (GBR)	●		1	0
1	Pierre-Hugues Herbert (FRA)	●		1	0
1	August Holmgren (DEN)	●		1	0
1	Maximus Jones (THA)	●		1	0
1	Aslan Karatsev	●		1	0
1	Vít Kopřiva (CZE)	●		1	0
1	Stefan Kozlov (USA)	●		1	0
1	Mitchell Krueger (USA)	●		1	0
1	Jason Kubler (AUS)	●		1	0
1	Dimitar Kuzmanov (BUL)	●		1	0
1	Mark Lajal (EST)	●		1	0
1	Dušan Lajović (SRB)	●		1	0
1	Martín Landaluce (ESP)	●		1	0
1	George Loffhagen (GBR)	●		1	0
1	Hamad Medjedovic (SRB)	●		1	0
1	Daniel Mérida (ESP)	●		1	0
1	Alex Michelsen (USA)	●		1	0
1	Giovanni Mpetshi Perricard (FRA)	●		1	0
1	Stefano Napolitano (ITA)	●		1	0
1	Andrea Pellegrino (ITA)	●		1	0
1	Ryan Peniston (GBR)	●		1	0
1	Dmitry Popko (KAZ)	●		1	0
1	Saba Purtseladze (GEO)	●		1	0
1	Henrique Rocha (POR)	●		1	0
1	Chris Rodesch (LUX)	●		1	0
1	Abdullah Shelbayh (JOR)	●		1	0
1	Timofey Skatov (KAZ)	●		1	0
1	Colton Smith (USA)	●		1	0
1	Cedrik-Marcel Stebe (GER)	●		1	0
1	Jan-Lennard Struff (GER)	●		1	0
1	Tseng Chun-hsin (TPE)	●		1	0
1	Camilo Ugo Carabelli (ARG)	●		1	0
1	Luca Van Assche (FRA)	●		1	0
1	Juan Pablo Varillas (PER)	●		1	0
1	Adam Walton (AUS)	●		1	0
1	Yosuke Watanuki (JPN)	●		1	0
1	Wu Yibing (CHN)	●		1	0
1	Giulio Zeppieri (ITA)	●		1	0
1	Guido Andreozzi (ARG)		●	0	1
1	Sander Arends (NED)		●	0	1
1	Romain Arneodo (MON)		●	0	1
1	Alafia Ayeni (USA)		●	0	1
1	Siddhant Banthia (IND)		●	0	1
1	Petr Bar Biryukov		●	0	1
1	Mateo Barreiros Reyes (BRA)		●	0	1
1	Hynek Bartoň (CZE)		●	0	1
1	Sergey Betov		●	0	1
1	Alexandr Binda (ITA)		●	0	1
1	Constantin Bittoun Kouzmine (FRA)		●	0	1
1	Federico Bondioli (ITA)		●	0	1
1	Pedro Boscardin Dias (BRA)		●	0	1
1	Luís Britto (BRA)		●	0	1
1	Gianluca Cadenasso (ITA)		●	0	1
1	Luca Castelnuovo (SUI)		●	0	1
1	Íñigo Cervantes (ESP)		●	0	1
1	Joshua Charlton (AUS)		●	0	1
1	Keshav Chopra (USA)		●	0	1
1	Victor Vlad Cornea (ROU)		●	0	1
1	Daniel Cukierman (ISR)		●	0	1
1	Jesper de Jong (NED)		●	0	1
1	Jake Delaney (AUS)		●	0	1
1	Corentin Denolly (FRA)		●	0	1
1	Aziz Dougaz (TUN)		●	0	1
1	Scott Duncan (GBR)		●	0	1
1	Alexander Erler (AUT)		●	0	1
1	Antoine Escoffier (FRA)		●	0	1
1	Kilian Feldbausch (SUI)		●	0	1
1	Andrew Fenty (USA)		●	0	1
1	Constantin Frantzen (GER)		●	0	1
1	Marcel Granollers (ESP)		●	0	1
1	Manuel Guinard (FRA)		●	0	1
1	Benjamin Hassan (LBN)		●	0	1
1	Alex Hernández (MEX)		●	0	1
1	Nico Hipfl (AUT)		●	0	1
1	Max Houkes (NED)		●	0	1
1	Huang Tsung-hao (TPE)		●	0	1
1	Conner Huertas del Pino (PER)		●	0	1
1	Giles Hussey (GBR)		●	0	1
1	Taisei Ichikawa (JPN)		●	0	1
1	Johannes Ingildsen (DEN)		●	0	1
1	Pruchya Isaro (THA)		●	0	1
1	Hendrik Jebens (GER)		●	0	1
1	Jan Jermář (CZE)		●	0	1
1	Garrett Johns (USA)		●	0	1
1	Luke Johnson (GBR)		●	0	1
1	Niki Kaliyanda Poonacha (IND)		●	0	1
1	Miloš Karol (SVK)		●	0	1
1	Dominik Kellovský (CZE)		●	0	1
1	Jérôme Kym (SUI)		●	0	1
1	Ivan Liutarevich		●	0	1
1	Pablo Llamas Ruiz (ESP)		●	0	1
1	James MacKinlay (GBR)		●	0	1
1	Jody Maginley (ATG)		●	0	1
1	Mario Mansilla Díez (ESP)		●	0	1
1	Andres Martin (USA)		●	0	1
1	Andreas Mies (GER)		●	0	1
1	Luís Miguel (BRA)		●	0	1
1	Daniel Milavsky (USA)		●	0	1
1	Shunsuke Mitsui (JPN)		●	0	1
1	Filippo Moroni (ITA)		●	0	1
1	Jeevan Nedunchezhiyan (IND)		●	0	1
1	Patrik Niklas-Salminen (FIN)		●	0	1
1	Petr Nouza (CZE)		●	0	1
1	Sebastian Ofner (AUT)		●	0	1
1	Daniil Ostapenkov		●	0	1
1	Aziz Ouakaa (TUN)		●	0	1
1	Dominik Palán (CZE)		●	0	1
1	Stuart Parker (GBR)		●	0	1
1	Kody Pearson (AUS)		●	0	1
1	Tiago Pereira (POR)		●	0	1
1	Alfredo Perez (USA)		●	0	1
1	Marc Polmans (AUS)		●	0	1
1	Oleg Prihodko (UKR)		●	0	1
1	Bruno Pujol Navarro (ESP)		●	0	1
1	Ramkumar Ramanathan (IND)		●	0	1
1	Fabien Reboul (FRA)		●	0	1
1	Dominik Reček (CZE)		●	0	1
1	Eduardo Ribeiro (BRA)		●	0	1
1	Patrik Rikl (CZE)		●	0	1
1	Fernando Romboli (BRA)		●	0	1
1	Matej Sabanov (SRB)		●	0	1
1	Stefanos Sakellaridis (GRE)		●	0	1
1	Benito Sanchez Martinez (GER)		●	0	1
1	Akira Santillan (AUS)		●	0	1
1	Paulo André Saraiva dos Santos (BRA)		●	0	1
1	Noah Schachter (USA)		●	0	1
1	Joel Schwärzler (AUT)		●	0	1
1	Marat Sharipov		●	0	1
1	Joshua Sheehy (USA)		●	0	1
1	Yuta Shimizu (JPN)		●	0	1
1	Daniel Siniakov (CZE)		●	0	1
1	Adrià Soriano Barrera (COL)		●	0	1
1	Reese Stalder (USA)		●	0	1
1	David Stevenson (GBR)		●	0	1
1	Naoki Tajima (JPN)		●	0	1
1	Petros Tsitsipas (GRE)		●	0	1
1	Li Tu (AUS)		●	0	1
1	Kaichi Uchida (JPN)		●	0	1
1	Kaito Uesugi (JPN)		●	0	1
1	Quinn Vandecasteele (USA)		●	0	1
1	Jacopo Vasamì (ITA)		●	0	1
1	Szymon Walków (POL)		●	0	1
1	Max Westphal (FRA)		●	0	1
1	Max Wiskandt (GER)		●	0	1
1	Denis Yevseyev (KAZ)		●	0	1
1	Patrick Zahraj (GER)		●	0	1
1	Horacio Zeballos (ARG)		●	0	1
1	Beibit Zhukayev (KAZ)		●	0	1
1	Tyler Zink (USA)		●	0	1

=== Titles won by nation ===
Total	Nation	S	D
62	United States (USA)	23	39
32	Argentina (ARG)	16	16
31	France (FRA)	19	12
27	Great Britain (GBR)	15	12
27	Australia (AUS)	8	19
24	Czech Republic (CZE)	6	18
22	Spain (ESP)	11	11
21	Netherlands (NED)	1	20
20	Austria (AUT)	3	17
19	Germany (GER)	4	15
18	Italy (ITA)	13	5
18	Japan (JPN)	10	8
18	Brazil (BRA)	6	12
17	Croatia (CRO)	11	6
13	Belgium (BEL)	5	8
12	Chile (CHI)	7	5
11	Chinese Taipei (TPE)	1	10
9	Bolivia (BOL)	2	7
9	Poland (POL)	2	7
9	Switzerland (SUI)	1	8
8	India (IND)	0	8
8	Mexico (MEX)	0	8
7	Colombia (COL)	4	3
7	Peru (PER)	4	3
7	Ecuador (ECU)	1	6
6	Ukraine (UKR)	0	6
5	Norway (NOR)	5	0
5	Denmark (DEN)	4	1
5	Slovakia (SVK)	4	1
5	Kazakhstan (KAZ)	3	2
5	Tunisia (TUN)	3	2
5	Serbia (SRB)	2	3
5	New Zealand (NZL)	0	5
5	Venezuela (VEN)	0	5
4	Canada (CAN)	1	3
4	Portugal (POR)	1	3
3	Hungary (HUN)	3	0
3	Lithuania (LTU)	3	0
3	China (CHN)	2	1
3	Finland (FIN)	2	1
3	Bulgaria (BUL)	1	2
2	Estonia (EST)	2	0
2	Paraguay (PAR)	2	0
2	Thailand (THA)	1	1
2	Northern Mariana Islands (NMI)	0	2
2	Sweden (SWE)	0	2
2	Uruguay (URU)	0	2
1	Georgia (GEO)	1	0
1	Ivory Coast (CIV)	1	0
1	Jordan (JOR)	1	0
1	Luxembourg (LUX)	1	0
1	Antigua and Barbuda (ATG)	0	1
1	Greece (GRE)	0	1
1	Israel (ISR)	0	1
1	Lebanon (LBN)	0	1
1	Monaco (MON)	0	1
1	Romania (ROU)	0	1

== Point distribution ==
Points are awarded as follows:

Tournament category	Singles									Doubles				
Tournament category	W	F	SF	QF	R16	R32	Q	Q2	Q1	W	F	SF	QF	R16
Challenger 175	175	90	50	25	13	0	6	3	0	175	100	60	32	0
Challenger 125	125	64	35	16	8	0	5	3	0	125	75	45	25	0
Challenger 100	100	50	25	14	7	0	4	2	0	100	60	36	20	0
Challenger 75	75	44	22	12	6	0	4	2	0	75	50	30	16	0
Challenger 50	50	25	14	8	4	0	3	1	0	50	30	17	9	0
