= 2022 ITF Men's World Tennis Tour (October–December) =

2022 edition of the second-tier tour for men's professional tennis

The 2022 ITF Men's World Tennis Tour is the 2022 edition of the second-tier tour for men's professional tennis. It is organised by the International Tennis Federation and is a tier below the ATP Challenger Tour. The ITF Men's World Tennis Tour includes tournaments with prize money ranging from $15,000 to $25,000.

== Key ==
M25 tournaments
M15 tournaments

== Month ==
=== October ===
Week of	Tournament	Winner	Runners-up	Semifinalists	Quarterfinalists
October 3	Cairns, Australia; Hard; M25; Singles and Doubles Draws	(Australia) Alex Bolt; 6–3, 6–2	(Northern Mariana Islands) Colin Sinclair	(Australia) Adam Walton (Australia) Blake Ellis	(Australia) Philip Sekulic (Australia) James McCabe (Australia) Jeremy Beale (Australia) Mitchell Harper
October 3	Cairns, Australia; Hard; M25; Singles and Doubles Draws	(United States) Kyle Seelig (Northern Mariana Islands) Colin Sinclair; 6–4, 6–2	(Australia) James McCabe (Australia) Adam Walton	(Australia) Adam Walton (Australia) Blake Ellis	(Australia) Philip Sekulic (Australia) James McCabe (Australia) Jeremy Beale (Australia) Mitchell Harper
October 3	Nevers, France; Hard (indoor); M25; Singles and Doubles Draws	(Belgium) Gauthier Onclin; 6–3, 2–6, 6–3	(Belgium) Raphaël Collignon	(France) Antoine Hoang (France) Sascha Gueymard Wayenburg	(France) Gabriel Debru (France) Matteo Martineau (France) Antoine Ghibaudo (France) Arthur Reymond
October 3	Nevers, France; Hard (indoor); M25; Singles and Doubles Draws	(France) Sascha Gueymard Wayenburg (France) Antoine Hoang; 6–7^{(10–12)}, 7–6^{(7–5)}, [10–7]	(Argentina) Federico Agustín Gómez (United Kingdom) Marcus Willis	(France) Antoine Hoang (France) Sascha Gueymard Wayenburg	(France) Gabriel Debru (France) Matteo Martineau (France) Antoine Ghibaudo (France) Arthur Reymond
October 3	Santa Margherita di Pula, Italy; Clay; M25; Singles and Doubles Draws	(Germany) Timo Stodder; 6–4, 2–6, 6–4	(Italy) Edoardo Lavagno	(Austria) Lukas Neumayer (Italy) Andrea Basso	(Greece) Stefanos Sakellaridis (Switzerland) Damien Wenger (United States) Oliver Crawford (Italy) Davide Galoppini
October 3	Santa Margherita di Pula, Italy; Clay; M25; Singles and Doubles Draws	(Latvia) Miķelis Lībietis (Germany) Timo Stodder; 6–1, 6–1	(Italy) Federico Campana (Italy) Leonardo Malgaroli	(Austria) Lukas Neumayer (Italy) Andrea Basso	(Greece) Stefanos Sakellaridis (Switzerland) Damien Wenger (United States) Oliver Crawford (Italy) Davide Galoppini
October 3	Zaragoza, Spain; Clay; M25; Singles and Doubles Draws	Ivan Gakhov; 6–4, 1–6, 6–2	(Spain) Javier Barranco Cosano	(Spain) Álvaro López San Martín (Germany) Louis Wessels	(Spain) Eduard Esteve Lobato (Spain) David Jordà Sanchis (Netherlands) Ryan Nijboer (Spain) Sergi Pérez Contri
October 3	Zaragoza, Spain; Clay; M25; Singles and Doubles Draws	(Spain) Pablo Llamas Ruiz (Spain) Benjamín Winter López; 6–3, 6–2	(Mexico) Alan Fernando Rubio Fierros (Ukraine) Eric Vanshelboim	(Spain) Álvaro López San Martín (Germany) Louis Wessels	(Spain) Eduard Esteve Lobato (Spain) David Jordà Sanchis (Netherlands) Ryan Nijboer (Spain) Sergi Pérez Contri
October 3	Sheffield, United Kingdom; Hard (indoor); M25; Singles and Doubles Draws	(United Kingdom) Arthur Fery; 6–3, 6–2	(United Kingdom) Giles Hussey	(India) Prajnesh Gunneswaran (Croatia) Mili Poljičak	(United Kingdom) Alastair Gray (France) Mathys Erhard (Estonia) Mark Lajal (Luxembourg) Alex Knaff
October 3	Sheffield, United Kingdom; Hard (indoor); M25; Singles and Doubles Draws	(United Kingdom) Giles Hussey (United Kingdom) Johannus Monday; 7–5, 6–4	(Finland) Eero Vasa (United Kingdom) Mark Whitehouse	(India) Prajnesh Gunneswaran (Croatia) Mili Poljičak	(United Kingdom) Alastair Gray (France) Mathys Erhard (Estonia) Mark Lajal (Luxembourg) Alex Knaff
October 3	Tây Ninh, Vietnam; Hard; M25; Singles and Doubles Draws	(Vietnam) Lý Hoàng Nam; 6–4, 6–4	(New Zealand) Ajeet Rai	(Hong Kong) Coleman Wong (France) Arthur Weber	(India) Digvijay Pratap Singh (Thailand) Wishaya Trongcharoenchaikul (Japan) Takuya Kumasaka (Chinese Taipei) Hsu Yu-hsiou
October 3	Tây Ninh, Vietnam; Hard; M25; Singles and Doubles Draws	(Japan) Tomohiro Masabayashi (Hong Kong) Coleman Wong; Walkover	(Chinese Taipei) Hsu Yu-hsiou (Thailand) Wishaya Trongcharoenchaikul	(Hong Kong) Coleman Wong (France) Arthur Weber	(India) Digvijay Pratap Singh (Thailand) Wishaya Trongcharoenchaikul (Japan) Takuya Kumasaka (Chinese Taipei) Hsu Yu-hsiou
October 3	Villa Carlos Paz, Argentina; Clay; M15; Singles and Doubles Draws	(Argentina) Matías Franco Descotte; 6–3, 6–4	(Argentina) Lucio Ratti	(Argentina) Alex Barrena (Brazil) Igor Gimenez	(Uruguay) Ignacio Carou (Argentina) Mariano Kestelboim (Argentina) Santiago de la Fuente (Argentina) Lautaro Midón
October 3	Villa Carlos Paz, Argentina; Clay; M15; Singles and Doubles Draws	(Argentina) Juan Ignacio Galarza (Argentina) Tomás Lipovšek Puches; 6–3, 7–6^{(7–5)}	(Argentina) Franco Emanuel Egea (Argentina) Gabriel Alejandro Hidalgo	(Argentina) Alex Barrena (Brazil) Igor Gimenez	(Uruguay) Ignacio Carou (Argentina) Mariano Kestelboim (Argentina) Santiago de la Fuente (Argentina) Lautaro Midón
October 3	Sozopol, Bulgaria; Hard; M15; Singles and Doubles Draws	(Romania) Sebastian Gima; 7–5, 6–2	(Poland) Maks Kaśnikowski	(Bulgaria) Alexander Donski (Poland) Jasza Szajrych	(Poland) Olaf Pieczkowski (Ukraine) Vladyslav Orlov (Germany) Robert Strombachs (Romania) Nicolae Frunză
October 3	Sozopol, Bulgaria; Hard; M15; Singles and Doubles Draws	(Poland) Maks Kaśnikowski (Poland) Olaf Pieczkowski; 6–3, 7–5	(Bulgaria) Yanaki Milev (Bulgaria) Petr Nesterov	(Bulgaria) Alexander Donski (Poland) Jasza Szajrych	(Poland) Olaf Pieczkowski (Ukraine) Vladyslav Orlov (Germany) Robert Strombachs (Romania) Nicolae Frunză
October 3	Manizales, Colombia; Clay; M15; Singles and Doubles Draws	(Peru) Jorge Panta; 6–1, 3–6, 7–6^{(7–3)}	(Brazil) Gustavo Heide	(Dominican Republic) Peter Bertran (Peru) Arklon Huertas del Pino	(Colombia) Nicolás Buitrago (Brazil) João Victor Couto Loureiro (United States) Victor Lilov (Peru) Conner Huertas del Pino
October 3	Manizales, Colombia; Clay; M15; Singles and Doubles Draws	(Italy) Davide Pontoglio (Italy) Alessio Zanotti; 1–6, 6–3, [10–8]	(Brazil) Lorenzo Esquici (Brazil) Vítor Leal	(Dominican Republic) Peter Bertran (Peru) Arklon Huertas del Pino	(Colombia) Nicolás Buitrago (Brazil) João Victor Couto Loureiro (United States) Victor Lilov (Peru) Conner Huertas del Pino
October 3	Sharm El Sheikh, Egypt; Hard; M15; Singles and Doubles Draws	(Georgia (country)) Saba Purtseladze; 6–3, 6–3	(Italy) Lorenzo Rottoli	(Italy) Marcello Serafini (Georgia (country)) Zura Tkemaladze	(Netherlands) Alec Deckers (Sweden) Leo Borg (Austria) Sebastian Sorger (China) Te Rigele
October 3	Sharm El Sheikh, Egypt; Hard; M15; Singles and Doubles Draws	(Slovakia) Lukáš Pokorný (Georgia (country)) Saba Purtseladze; 6–7^{(2–7)}, 6–3, [10–4]	(Slovakia) Peter Benjamín Privara (Poland) Borys Zgoła	(Italy) Marcello Serafini (Georgia (country)) Zura Tkemaladze	(Netherlands) Alec Deckers (Sweden) Leo Borg (Austria) Sebastian Sorger (China) Te Rigele
October 3	Maputo, Mozambique; Hard; M15; Singles and Doubles Draws	(South Africa) Kris van Wyk; 5–7, 6–3, 6–0	(Zimbabwe) Mehluli Don Ayanda Sibanda	(Italy) Lorenzo Bocchi (Thailand) Palaphoom Kovapitukted	(Belgium) Tibo Colson (Serbia) Viktor Jović (South Africa) Alec Beckley (South Africa) Khololwam Montsi
October 3	Maputo, Mozambique; Hard; M15; Singles and Doubles Draws	(South Africa) Alec Beckley (Zimbabwe) Mehluli Don Ayanda Sibanda; 6–1, 7–5	(Burundi) Guy Orly Iradukunda; Egor Tsarapkin	(Italy) Lorenzo Bocchi (Thailand) Palaphoom Kovapitukted	(Belgium) Tibo Colson (Serbia) Viktor Jović (South Africa) Alec Beckley (South Africa) Khololwam Montsi
October 3	Monastir, Tunisia; Hard; M15; Singles and Doubles Draws	(China) Mu Tao; 6–7^{(4–7)}, 6–3, 6–3	(Chinese Taipei) Huang Tsung-hao	(Japan) Taiyo Yamanaka (China) Sun Fajing	(Australia) Tom Evans (Algeria) Samir Hamza Reguig (Germany) Maik Steiner (India) Niki Kaliyanda Poonacha
October 3	Monastir, Tunisia; Hard; M15; Singles and Doubles Draws	(Australia) James Frawley (Germany) Christoph Negritu; 6–4, 1–6, [10–6]	(United States) Bruno Kuzuhara (China) Sun Fajing	(Japan) Taiyo Yamanaka (China) Sun Fajing	(Australia) Tom Evans (Algeria) Samir Hamza Reguig (Germany) Maik Steiner (India) Niki Kaliyanda Poonacha
October 3	Ithaca, United States; Hard (indoor); M15; Singles and Doubles Draws	(United Kingdom) Joshua Goodger; 6–4, 6–4	(Germany) Jannik Opitz	(United States) John McNally (United States) Gianni Ross	(Republic of Ireland) Osgar O'Hoisin (France) Paul Inchauspé (Romania) Radu Mihai Papoe (Japan) James Kent Trotter
October 3	Ithaca, United States; Hard (indoor); M15; Singles and Doubles Draws	(United States) John McNally (Canada) Benjamin Sigouin; 6–4, 7–6^{(7–5)}	(United States) Nico Mostardi (Germany) Jannik Opitz	(United States) John McNally (United States) Gianni Ross	(Republic of Ireland) Osgar O'Hoisin (France) Paul Inchauspé (Romania) Radu Mihai Papoe (Japan) James Kent Trotter
October 10	Río Cuarto, Argentina; Clay; M25; Singles and Doubles Draws	(Argentina) Hernán Casanova; 6–2, 6–3	(Argentina) Guido Iván Justo	(Argentina) Matías Franco Descotte (Argentina) Santiago de la Fuente	(Argentina) Franco Emanuel Egea (Argentina) Alex Barrena (Argentina) Leonardo Aboian (Uruguay) Franco Roncadelli
October 10	Río Cuarto, Argentina; Clay; M25; Singles and Doubles Draws	(Argentina) Leonardo Aboian (Argentina) Ignacio Monzón; 5–7, 6–4, [12–10]	(Argentina) Franco Emanuel Egea (Argentina) Gabriel Alejandro Hidalgo	(Argentina) Matías Franco Descotte (Argentina) Santiago de la Fuente	(Argentina) Franco Emanuel Egea (Argentina) Alex Barrena (Argentina) Leonardo Aboian (Uruguay) Franco Roncadelli
October 10	Cairns, Australia; Hard; M25; Singles and Doubles Draws	(Australia) Dane Sweeny; 6–2, 6–3	(Australia) Philip Sekulic	(United States) Kyle Seelig (Australia) Tristan Schoolkate	(Australia) Ethan Cook (Australia) Adam Walton (Australia) Thomas Fancutt (Northern Mariana Islands) Colin Sinclair
October 10	Cairns, Australia; Hard; M25; Singles and Doubles Draws	(Australia) Blake Ellis (Australia) Tristan Schoolkate; 6–4, 6–1	(Australia) Aaron Addison (Australia) Calum Puttergill	(United States) Kyle Seelig (Australia) Tristan Schoolkate	(Australia) Ethan Cook (Australia) Adam Walton (Australia) Thomas Fancutt (Northern Mariana Islands) Colin Sinclair
October 10	Rodez, France; Hard (indoor); M25+H; Singles and Doubles Draws	(France) Alexis Gautier; 7–6^{(7–5)}, 7–5	(France) Antoine Hoang	(Belgium) Raphaël Collignon (Belgium) Gauthier Onclin	(France) Matteo Martineau (Turkey) Ergi Kırkın (France) Sascha Gueymard Wayenburg (France) Arthur Bouquier
October 10	Rodez, France; Hard (indoor); M25+H; Singles and Doubles Draws	(Netherlands) Mats Hermans (Netherlands) Mick Veldheer; 6–3, 6–4	(Croatia) Zvonimir Babić (Australia) Brandon Walkin	(Belgium) Raphaël Collignon (Belgium) Gauthier Onclin	(France) Matteo Martineau (Turkey) Ergi Kırkın (France) Sascha Gueymard Wayenburg (France) Arthur Bouquier
October 10	Santa Margherita di Pula, Italy; Clay; M25; Singles and Doubles Draws	(Germany) Timo Stodder; 6–2, 6–2	(Italy) Fausto Tabacco	(Poland) Daniel Michalski (Italy) Giorgio Tabacco	(Romania) Cezar Crețu (Italy) Francesco Forti (Italy) Julian Ocleppo (Austria) Lukas Neumayer
October 10	Santa Margherita di Pula, Italy; Clay; M25; Singles and Doubles Draws	(Latvia) Miķelis Lībietis (Germany) Timo Stodder; 6–3, 6–3	(Romania) Cezar Crețu (Romania) Alexandru Jecan	(Poland) Daniel Michalski (Italy) Giorgio Tabacco	(Romania) Cezar Crețu (Italy) Francesco Forti (Italy) Julian Ocleppo (Austria) Lukas Neumayer
October 10	Sunderland, United Kingdom; Hard (indoor); M25; Singles and Doubles Draws	(United Kingdom) Harry Wendelken; 6–4, 6–4	(United Kingdom) Arthur Fery	(United Kingdom) Daniel Cox (Portugal) Gonçalo Oliveira	(France) Lucas Poullain (Estonia) Mark Lajal (Israel) Daniel Cukierman (United Kingdom) Ben Jones
October 10	Sunderland, United Kingdom; Hard (indoor); M25; Singles and Doubles Draws	(United Kingdom) Arthur Fery (Croatia) Mili Poljičak; 6–3, 6–4	(United Kingdom) Giles Hussey (United Kingdom) Johannus Monday	(United Kingdom) Daniel Cox (Portugal) Gonçalo Oliveira	(France) Lucas Poullain (Estonia) Mark Lajal (Israel) Daniel Cukierman (United Kingdom) Ben Jones
October 10	Sozopol, Bulgaria; Hard; M15; Singles and Doubles Draws	(Bulgaria) Alexandar Lazarov; 6–1, 6–1	(Ukraine) Vladyslav Orlov	(Poland) Maks Kaśnikowski (Poland) Martyn Pawelski	(Bulgaria) Alexander Donski (Turkey) Cengiz Aksu (Bulgaria) Yanaki Milev (Italy) Riccardo Balzerani
October 10	Sozopol, Bulgaria; Hard; M15; Singles and Doubles Draws	(Bulgaria) Alexander Donski (Ukraine) Vladyslav Orlov; 6–2, 3–6, [10–5]	(Turkey) Tuna Altuna (Poland) Olaf Pieczkowski	(Poland) Maks Kaśnikowski (Poland) Martyn Pawelski	(Bulgaria) Alexander Donski (Turkey) Cengiz Aksu (Bulgaria) Yanaki Milev (Italy) Riccardo Balzerani
October 10	Sharm El Sheikh, Egypt; Hard; M15; Singles and Doubles Draws	(Netherlands) Alec Deckers; 6–3, 6–3	(Egypt) Amr Elsayed	(Italy) Luca Giacomini (New Zealand) Jack Loutit	(Turkey) Koray Kırcı (Georgia (country)) Saba Purtseladze (Australia) Jacob Bradshaw (Slovakia) Lukáš Pokorný
October 10	Sharm El Sheikh, Egypt; Hard; M15; Singles and Doubles Draws	(New Zealand) Finn Reynolds (United States) Andrew Rogers; 0–6, 6–2, [13–11]	(Chinese Taipei) Tsai Chang-lin (China) Zheng Baoluo	(Italy) Luca Giacomini (New Zealand) Jack Loutit	(Turkey) Koray Kırcı (Georgia (country)) Saba Purtseladze (Australia) Jacob Bradshaw (Slovakia) Lukáš Pokorný
October 10	Heraklion, Greece; Hard; M15; Singles and Doubles Draws	(Austria) David Pichler; 6–4, 6–2	(Italy) Simone Roncalli	(Estonia) Kristjan Tamm (Cyprus) Stylianos Christodoulou	(Finland) Aleksi Löfman (Japan) Jumpei Yamasaki (Israel) Ben Weintraub (Spain) Mario González Fernández
October 10	Heraklion, Greece; Hard; M15; Singles and Doubles Draws	(Switzerland) Dylan Dietrich (Spain) David Pérez Sanz; 7–6^{(7–5)}, 6–7^{(4–7)}, [10–8]	(Czech Republic) Dominik Palán (Estonia) Kristjan Tamm	(Estonia) Kristjan Tamm (Cyprus) Stylianos Christodoulou	(Finland) Aleksi Löfman (Japan) Jumpei Yamasaki (Israel) Ben Weintraub (Spain) Mario González Fernández
October 10	Maputo, Mozambique; Hard; M15; Singles and Doubles Draws	(Belgium) Tibo Colson; 6–3, 6–3	(South Africa) Dylan Salton	(Italy) Gabriele Pennaforti (Israel) Jonathan Baron	(Ukraine) Oleksandr Bielinskyi (Burundi) Guy Orly Iradukunda (South Africa) Kris van Wyk (South Africa) Alec Beckley
October 10	Maputo, Mozambique; Hard; M15; Singles and Doubles Draws	(Ukraine) Oleksandr Bielinskyi (Thailand) Palaphoom Kovapitukted; 6–2, 6–2	(Belgium) Tibo Colson (United States) Emmett Ward	(Italy) Gabriele Pennaforti (Israel) Jonathan Baron	(Ukraine) Oleksandr Bielinskyi (Burundi) Guy Orly Iradukunda (South Africa) Kris van Wyk (South Africa) Alec Beckley
October 10	Monastir, Tunisia; Hard; M15; Singles and Doubles Draws	(Germany) Christoph Negritu; 7–6^{(7–5)}, 7–6^{(7–5)}	(China) Sun Fajing	(Netherlands) Jarno Jans (France) Alexis Boureau	(Italy) Stefano Reitano (France) Constantin Bittoun Kouzmine (France) Nathan Seateun (China) Mo Yecong
October 10	Monastir, Tunisia; Hard; M15; Singles and Doubles Draws	(India) Rithvik Choudary Bollipalli (India) Niki Kaliyanda Poonacha; 6–3, 7–5	(Thailand) Maximus Jones (India) Parikshit Somani	(Netherlands) Jarno Jans (France) Alexis Boureau	(Italy) Stefano Reitano (France) Constantin Bittoun Kouzmine (France) Nathan Seateun (China) Mo Yecong
October 17	Rio de Janeiro, Brazil; Clay; M25; Singles and Doubles Draws	(Brazil) Wilson Leite; 6–3, 6–2	(Brazil) José Pereira	(Argentina) Leonardo Aboian (Brazil) Lorenzo Esquici	(Argentina) Mateo del Pino (Brazil) Nicolas Zanellato (Brazil) Marcelo Zormann (Brazil) João Fonseca
October 17	Rio de Janeiro, Brazil; Clay; M25; Singles and Doubles Draws	(Brazil) Orlando Luz (Brazil) Marcelo Zormann; 6–4, 6–2	(Brazil) Wilson Leite (Brazil) José Pereira	(Argentina) Leonardo Aboian (Brazil) Lorenzo Esquici	(Argentina) Mateo del Pino (Brazil) Nicolas Zanellato (Brazil) Marcelo Zormann (Brazil) João Fonseca
October 17	Santa Margherita di Pula, Italy; Clay; M25; Singles and Doubles Draws	(Poland) Daniel Michalski; 7–6^{(7–0)}, 6–3	(Germany) Timo Stodder	(Italy) Alexander Weis (Romania) Cezar Crețu	(Italy) Francesco Forti (Italy) Federico Iannaccone (Italy) Fausto Tabacco (Italy) Luigi Sorrentino
October 17	Santa Margherita di Pula, Italy; Clay; M25; Singles and Doubles Draws	(Romania) Cezar Crețu (Romania) Alexandru Jecan; 6–3, 6–3	(Italy) Francesco Forti (Italy) Manuel Mazza	(Italy) Alexander Weis (Romania) Cezar Crețu	(Italy) Francesco Forti (Italy) Federico Iannaccone (Italy) Fausto Tabacco (Italy) Luigi Sorrentino
October 17	Girona, Spain; Clay; M25; Singles and Doubles Draws	(Spain) Oriol Roca Batalla; 6–3, 6–3	(Canada) Steven Diez	(Spain) Alejandro Moro Cañas (France) Titouan Droguet	(Spain) Imanol López Morillo (Spain) Javier Barranco Cosano (Spain) Carlos López Montagud (France) Corentin Denolly
October 17	Girona, Spain; Clay; M25; Singles and Doubles Draws	(Spain) Eduard Esteve Lobato (Spain) Oriol Roca Batalla; 6–2, 6–3	(Spain) Carlos López Montagud (Spain) Álvaro López San Martín	(Spain) Alejandro Moro Cañas (France) Titouan Droguet	(Spain) Imanol López Morillo (Spain) Javier Barranco Cosano (Spain) Carlos López Montagud (France) Corentin Denolly
October 17	Glasgow, United Kingdom; Hard (indoor); M25; Singles and Doubles Draws	(United Kingdom) Aidan McHugh; 7–6^{(7–4)}, 6–4	(Poland) Filip Peliwo	(United Kingdom) Giles Hussey (United Kingdom) George Loffhagen	(United Kingdom) Arthur Fery (United Kingdom) Patrick Brady (Denmark) Christian Sigsgaard (United Kingdom) Anton Matusevich
October 17	Glasgow, United Kingdom; Hard (indoor); M25; Singles and Doubles Draws	(Israel) Daniel Cukierman (United Kingdom) Giles Hussey; 6–7^{(3–7)}, 6–4, [10–8]	(United Kingdom) Anton Matusevich (United Kingdom) Joshua Paris	(United Kingdom) Giles Hussey (United Kingdom) George Loffhagen	(United Kingdom) Arthur Fery (United Kingdom) Patrick Brady (Denmark) Christian Sigsgaard (United Kingdom) Anton Matusevich
October 17	Harlingen, United States; Hard; M25; Singles and Doubles Draws	(United States) Martin Damm; 6–7^{(4–7)}, 6–3, 6–4	(Australia) Bernard Tomic	(United States) Strong Kirchheimer (United States) Andres Martin	(United Kingdom) Charles Broom (United Kingdom) Toby Samuel (United States) Kyle Kang (United States) Ezekiel Clark
October 17	Harlingen, United States; Hard; M25; Singles and Doubles Draws	(United States) Trey Hilderbrand (United States) Noah Schachter; 7–5, 7–5	(Slovenia) Sebastian Dominko (Germany) Adrian Oetzbach	(United States) Strong Kirchheimer (United States) Andres Martin	(United Kingdom) Charles Broom (United Kingdom) Toby Samuel (United States) Kyle Kang (United States) Ezekiel Clark
October 17	Cochabamba, Bolivia; Clay; M15; Singles and Doubles Draws	(Bolivia) Juan Carlos Prado Ángelo; 6–2, 3–6, 6–2	(Italy) Davide Pontoglio	(Chile) Nicolás Bruna (Colombia) Enrique Peña	(Argentina) Tomás Farjat (Brazil) Elio José Ribeiro Lago (Italy) Alessio Zanotti (Colombia) Nicolás Buitrago
October 17	Cochabamba, Bolivia; Clay; M15; Singles and Doubles Draws	(Bolivia) Alejandro Mendoza (Bolivia) Juan Carlos Prado Ángelo; 6–4, 6–2	(Italy) Davide Pontoglio (Italy) Alessio Zanotti	(Chile) Nicolás Bruna (Colombia) Enrique Peña	(Argentina) Tomás Farjat (Brazil) Elio José Ribeiro Lago (Italy) Alessio Zanotti (Colombia) Nicolás Buitrago
October 17	Sozopol, Bulgaria; Hard; M15; Singles and Doubles Draws	(Bulgaria) Alexandar Lazarov; 6–2, 6–4	(Poland) Maks Kaśnikowski	(Bulgaria) Alexander Donski (Bulgaria) Simeon Terziev	(Romania) Valentin Vanta (Romania) Ștefan Paloși (Italy) Riccardo Balzerani (Ukraine) Vladyslav Orlov
October 17	Sozopol, Bulgaria; Hard; M15; Singles and Doubles Draws	(Bulgaria) Yanaki Milev (Bulgaria) Petr Nesterov; 6–3, 6–2	(Bulgaria) Adriano Dzhenev (Bulgaria) Anthony Genov	(Bulgaria) Alexander Donski (Bulgaria) Simeon Terziev	(Romania) Valentin Vanta (Romania) Ștefan Paloși (Italy) Riccardo Balzerani (Ukraine) Vladyslav Orlov
October 17	Sharm El Sheikh, Egypt; Hard; M15; Singles and Doubles Draws	Ilia Simakin; 7–6^{(7–2)}, 2–6, 6–3	(Slovakia) Lukáš Pokorný	(New Zealand) Finn Reynolds (United States) Andrew Rogers	(Thailand) Wishaya Trongcharoenchaikul; Petr Bar Biryukov (Chinese Taipei) Lo Chien-hsun (Georgia (country)) George Tsivadze
October 17	Sharm El Sheikh, Egypt; Hard; M15; Singles and Doubles Draws	(Chinese Taipei) Tsai Chang-lin (China) Zheng Baoluo; Walkover	(New Zealand) Finn Reynolds (United States) Andrew Rogers	(New Zealand) Finn Reynolds (United States) Andrew Rogers	(Thailand) Wishaya Trongcharoenchaikul; Petr Bar Biryukov (Chinese Taipei) Lo Chien-hsun (Georgia (country)) George Tsivadze
October 17	Heraklion, Greece; Hard; M15; Singles and Doubles Draws	(Croatia) Dino Prižmić; 6–2, 6–1	(Spain) Mario González Fernández	(Czech Republic) Jiří Barnat (Netherlands) Sidané Pontjodikromo	(Czech Republic) Dominik Palán (Germany) Leopold Zima (Austria) Jonas Trinker (Austria) David Pichler
October 17	Heraklion, Greece; Hard; M15; Singles and Doubles Draws	(Slovakia) Miloš Karol (Austria) David Pichler; 6–4, 5–7, [10–7]	(Netherlands) Dax Donders (Netherlands) Sidané Pontjodikromo	(Czech Republic) Jiří Barnat (Netherlands) Sidané Pontjodikromo	(Czech Republic) Dominik Palán (Germany) Leopold Zima (Austria) Jonas Trinker (Austria) David Pichler
October 17	Monastir, Tunisia; Hard; M15; Singles and Doubles Draws	(Portugal) Jaime Faria; 7–5, 6–4	(Lebanon) Hady Habib	(France) Mathieu Scaglia (France) Alexandre Aubriot	(Netherlands) Jarno Jans (Germany) Christoph Negritu (Portugal) Henrique Rocha; Maxim Zhukov
October 17	Monastir, Tunisia; Hard; M15; Singles and Doubles Draws	(Tunisia) Anis Ghorbel (Lebanon) Hady Habib; 7–6^{(7–5)}, 1–6, [10–8]	(Netherlands) Brian Bozemoj (Netherlands) Jarno Jans	(France) Mathieu Scaglia (France) Alexandre Aubriot	(Netherlands) Jarno Jans (Germany) Christoph Negritu (Portugal) Henrique Rocha; Maxim Zhukov
October 17	Antalya, Turkey; Clay; M15; Singles and Doubles Draws	(Italy) Luca Tomasetto; 6–4, 6–1	(United States) Bruno Kuzuhara	Savva Polukhin (France) Maxime Chazal	(Italy) Stefano Battaglino (France) Lucas Bouquet (Morocco) Yassine Dlimi (Czech Republic) Patrik Rikl
October 17	Antalya, Turkey; Clay; M15; Singles and Doubles Draws	Andrey Chepelev; Denis Klok; 6–7^{(3–7)}, 6–3, [10–5]	(Slovenia) Jan Kupčič (Slovenia) Maj Premzl	Savva Polukhin (France) Maxime Chazal	(Italy) Stefano Battaglino (France) Lucas Bouquet (Morocco) Yassine Dlimi (Czech Republic) Patrik Rikl
October 24	Saint-Augustin, Canada; Hard (indoor); M25; Singles and Doubles Draws	(Tunisia) Aziz Dougaz; 7–5, 6–4	(Canada) Justin Boulais	(United States) Roy Smith (United States) Patrick Kypson	(Republic of Ireland) Osgar O'Hoisin (United States) Patrick Maloney (Canada) Jonathan Sorbo (Canada) Liam Draxl
October 24	Saint-Augustin, Canada; Hard (indoor); M25; Singles and Doubles Draws	(Canada) Duncan Chan (Canada) Keegan Rice; 6–3, 6–3	(Canada) Marko Stakusic (Canada) Jaden Weekes	(United States) Roy Smith (United States) Patrick Kypson	(Republic of Ireland) Osgar O'Hoisin (United States) Patrick Maloney (Canada) Jonathan Sorbo (Canada) Liam Draxl
October 24	Sarreguemines, France; Carpet (indoor); M25; Singles and Doubles Draws	(Germany) Mats Rosenkranz; 6–3, 3–6, 6–3	(France) Dan Added	(France) Antoine Hoang (Germany) Elmar Ejupovic	(Belgium) Michael Geerts (Czech Republic) Jakub Menšík (Germany) Kai Wehnelt (France) Alexis Gautier
October 24	Sarreguemines, France; Carpet (indoor); M25; Singles and Doubles Draws	(United Kingdom) Scott Duncan (United Kingdom) Marcus Willis; 4–6, 6–3, [10–8]	(France) Arthur Bouquier (France) Grégoire Jacq	(France) Antoine Hoang (Germany) Elmar Ejupovic	(Belgium) Michael Geerts (Czech Republic) Jakub Menšík (Germany) Kai Wehnelt (France) Alexis Gautier
October 24	Jakarta, Indonesia; Hard; M25; Singles and Doubles Draws	(France) Arthur Weber; 7–6^{(11–9)}, 7–6^{(11–9)}	(Australia) Thomas Fancutt	(Japan) Renta Tokuda; Konstantin Kravchuk	(China) Sun Fajing (India) Sidharth Rawat (Thailand) Kasidit Samrej (South Korea) Park Ui-sung
October 24	Jakarta, Indonesia; Hard; M25; Singles and Doubles Draws	(Australia) Thomas Fancutt (Australia) Brandon Walkin; 4–6, 6–3, [10–6]	(China) Sun Fajing (Japan) Seita Watanabe	(Japan) Renta Tokuda; Konstantin Kravchuk	(China) Sun Fajing (India) Sidharth Rawat (Thailand) Kasidit Samrej (South Korea) Park Ui-sung
October 24	Afula, Israel; Hard; M25; Singles and Doubles Draws	(Israel) Daniel Cukierman; 7–6^{(7–4)}, 6–3	(Poland) Filip Peliwo	(Germany) Louis Wessels (Turkey) Yankı Erel	(Ukraine) Vladyslav Orlov (Israel) Sahar Simon (Israel) Shay Bar Menahem (Ukraine) Eric Vanshelboim
October 24	Afula, Israel; Hard; M25; Singles and Doubles Draws	(Israel) Daniel Cukierman (United Kingdom) Joshua Paris; 6–3, 6–3	(Ukraine) Vladyslav Orlov (Ukraine) Eric Vanshelboim	(Germany) Louis Wessels (Turkey) Yankı Erel	(Ukraine) Vladyslav Orlov (Israel) Sahar Simon (Israel) Shay Bar Menahem (Ukraine) Eric Vanshelboim
October 24	Monastir, Tunisia; Hard; M25; Singles and Doubles Draws	(France) Mathys Erhard; 7–6^{(7–2)}, 7–6^{(7–3)}	(Belgium) Gauthier Onclin	(France) Ugo Blanchet (France) Clément Tabur	(Tunisia) Skander Mansouri (Uzbekistan) Sergey Fomin (Germany) Christoph Negritu (Lebanon) Hady Habib
October 24	Monastir, Tunisia; Hard; M25; Singles and Doubles Draws	(India) Rithvik Choudary Bollipalli (India) Niki Kaliyanda Poonacha; 6–3, 2–6, [10–6]	(Australia) James Frawley (Germany) Christoph Negritu	(France) Ugo Blanchet (France) Clément Tabur	(Tunisia) Skander Mansouri (Uzbekistan) Sergey Fomin (Germany) Christoph Negritu (Lebanon) Hady Habib
October 24	Gaziantep, Turkey; Clay; M25; Singles and Doubles Draws	(Romania) Nicholas David Ionel; 6–2, 6–2	(France) Corentin Denolly	(Ukraine) Oleg Prihodko (Switzerland) Damien Wenger	Ivan Gakhov (Sweden) Dragoș Nicolae Mădăraș; Bogdan Bobrov (France) Maxime Mora
October 24	Gaziantep, Turkey; Clay; M25; Singles and Doubles Draws	(France) Corentin Denolly (Switzerland) Damien Wenger; 6–3, 6–2	(Turkey) Sarp Ağabigün (Turkey) S Mert Özdemir	(Ukraine) Oleg Prihodko (Switzerland) Damien Wenger	Ivan Gakhov (Sweden) Dragoș Nicolae Mădăraș; Bogdan Bobrov (France) Maxime Mora
October 24	Santa Cruz de la Sierra, Bolivia; Clay; M15; Singles and Doubles Draws	(Bolivia) Murkel Dellien; 6–0, 6–2	(Peru) Conner Huertas del Pino	(Argentina) Julián Giménez (Argentina) Tomás Farjat	(Uruguay) Franco Roncadelli (Argentina) Matías Zukas (Chile) Nicolás Bruna (Argentina) Valerio Aboian
October 24	Santa Cruz de la Sierra, Bolivia; Clay; M15; Singles and Doubles Draws	(Argentina) Lorenzo Gagliardo (Uruguay) Franco Roncadelli; 7–5, 6–4	(Chile) Nicolás Bruna (Argentina) Lautaro Agustín Falabella	(Argentina) Julián Giménez (Argentina) Tomás Farjat	(Uruguay) Franco Roncadelli (Argentina) Matías Zukas (Chile) Nicolás Bruna (Argentina) Valerio Aboian
October 24	Sharm El Sheikh, Egypt; Hard; M15; Singles and Doubles Draws	(Sweden) Leo Borg; 3–6, 7–5, 6–4	(Slovenia) Bor Artnak	(New Zealand) Finn Reynolds (Australia) Jacob Bradshaw	Ilia Simakin (Chinese Taipei) Lo Chien-hsun; Petr Bar Biryukov (Georgia (country)) Saba Purtseladze
October 24	Sharm El Sheikh, Egypt; Hard; M15; Singles and Doubles Draws	(United States) Alex Kuperstein (New Zealand) Finn Reynolds; 6–0, 6–4	(Italy) Andrea Picchione (Italy) Nicolò Pozzani	(New Zealand) Finn Reynolds (Australia) Jacob Bradshaw	Ilia Simakin (Chinese Taipei) Lo Chien-hsun; Petr Bar Biryukov (Georgia (country)) Saba Purtseladze
October 24	Pärnu, Estonia; Hard (indoor); M15; Singles and Doubles Draws	(Switzerland) Nicolas Kobelt; 6–3, 7–6^{(7–3)}	(Germany) Niklas Schell	(United Kingdom) Daniel Little (Poland) Szymon Kielan	(Uzbekistan) Khumoyun Sultanov (Croatia) Vito Tonejc (Finland) Eero Vasa (Germany) Philip Florig
October 24	Pärnu, Estonia; Hard (indoor); M15; Singles and Doubles Draws	(Poland) Szymon Kielan (Poland) Yann Wójcik; 6–4, 7–6^{(7–5)}	(United Kingdom) Daniel Little (Germany) Robert Strombachs	(United Kingdom) Daniel Little (Poland) Szymon Kielan	(Uzbekistan) Khumoyun Sultanov (Croatia) Vito Tonejc (Finland) Eero Vasa (Germany) Philip Florig
October 24	Heraklion, Greece; Hard; M15; Singles and Doubles Draws	(North Macedonia) Kalin Ivanovski; 6–1, 6–1	(Romania) Sebastian Gima	(Czech Republic) Pavel Nejedlý (Italy) Andrea Guerrieri	(Czech Republic) Jiří Barnat (Netherlands) Sidané Pontjodikromo (Czech Republic) Jakub Nicod (Greece) Stefanos Sakellaridis
October 24	Heraklion, Greece; Hard; M15; Singles and Doubles Draws	(Greece) Christos Antonopoulos (Greece) Alexandros Skorilas; 6–4, 6–2	(Luxembourg) Raphael Calzi (Germany) Marlon Vankan	(Czech Republic) Pavel Nejedlý (Italy) Andrea Guerrieri	(Czech Republic) Jiří Barnat (Netherlands) Sidané Pontjodikromo (Czech Republic) Jakub Nicod (Greece) Stefanos Sakellaridis
October 24	Al Zahra, Kuwait; Hard; M15; Singles and Doubles Draws	(Thailand) Palaphoom Kovapitukted; 6–4, 6–4	(Czech Republic) Dominik Palán	(Georgia (country)) Aleksandre Bakshi (France) Antoine Vincent	(United Kingdom) William Jansen (Ukraine) Viacheslav Bielinskyi; Bekhan Atlangeriev (Estonia) Kristjan Tamm
October 24	Al Zahra, Kuwait; Hard; M15; Singles and Doubles Draws	(United Kingdom) William Jansen (Poland) Borys Zgoła; 7–6^{(9–7)}, 6–2	Bekhan Atlangeriev; Ivan Denisov	(Georgia (country)) Aleksandre Bakshi (France) Antoine Vincent	(United Kingdom) William Jansen (Ukraine) Viacheslav Bielinskyi; Bekhan Atlangeriev (Estonia) Kristjan Tamm
October 24	Monastir, Tunisia; Hard; M15; Singles and Doubles Draws	(Belgium) Simon Beaupain; 6–3, 6–2	(Slovakia) Peter Benjamín Privara	(Germany) Dominik Böhler (Italy) Stefano Reitano	Mikalai Haliak (South Africa) Alec Beckley (Germany) Oscar Moraing (France) Raphaël Lambling
October 24	Monastir, Tunisia; Hard; M15; Singles and Doubles Draws	(Belgium) Simon Beaupain (Austria) David Pichler; 7–6^{(7–4)}, 6–1	(China) Li Majun (China) Xiao Linang	(Germany) Dominik Böhler (Italy) Stefano Reitano	Mikalai Haliak (South Africa) Alec Beckley (Germany) Oscar Moraing (France) Raphaël Lambling
October 24	Antalya, Turkey; Clay; M15; Singles and Doubles Draws	(Italy) Alexander Weis; 6–4, 6–4	(France) Maxime Chazal	(Germany) Tim Handel (Switzerland) Nicolás Parizzia	Andrey Chepelev (Romania) Dragoș Dima (Germany) Peter Heller (Argentina) Gian Matías Di Natale
October 24	Antalya, Turkey; Clay; M15; Singles and Doubles Draws	Igor Kudriashov (Uzbekistan) Maxim Shin; Walkover	(Germany) Tim Handel (Germany) Peter Heller	(Germany) Tim Handel (Switzerland) Nicolás Parizzia	Andrey Chepelev (Romania) Dragoș Dima (Germany) Peter Heller (Argentina) Gian Matías Di Natale
October 24	Norman, United States; Hard (indoor); M15; Singles and Doubles Draws	(Japan) Yuta Kikuchi; 7–5, 6–4	(Spain) Alex Martínez	(Germany) Lucas Gerch (Israel) Jordan Hasson	(United States) Tyler Zink (Syria) Kareem Al Allaf (Portugal) Daniel Rodrigues (Romania) Gabi Adrian Boitan
October 24	Norman, United States; Hard (indoor); M15; Singles and Doubles Draws	(United States) George Goldhoff (United States) Tyler Zink; 6–2, 6–1	(Belgium) Alessio Basile (United States) Aidan Kim	(Germany) Lucas Gerch (Israel) Jordan Hasson	(United States) Tyler Zink (Syria) Kareem Al Allaf (Portugal) Daniel Rodrigues (Romania) Gabi Adrian Boitan
October 24	Tallahassee, United States; Hard (indoor); M15; Singles and Doubles Draws	(Luxembourg) Alex Knaff; 6–3, 6–0	(United States) William Grant	(Norway) Andreja Petrovic (South Africa) Philip Henning	(United States) Cash Hanzlik (United States) Ryan Shane (United States) Cooper Williams (France) Antoine Cornut-Chauvinc
October 24	Tallahassee, United States; Hard (indoor); M15; Singles and Doubles Draws	(Ghana) Abraham Asaba (Antigua and Barbuda) Jody Maginley; 4–6, 6–2, [10–7]	(Venezuela) Ricardo Rodríguez-Pace (Poland) Mateusz Terczyński	(Norway) Andreja Petrovic (South Africa) Philip Henning	(United States) Cash Hanzlik (United States) Ryan Shane (United States) Cooper Williams (France) Antoine Cornut-Chauvinc
October 31	Salta, Argentina; Clay; M25; Singles and Doubles Draws	(Brazil) Gustavo Heide; 6–4, 6–4	(Chile) Gonzalo Lama	(Argentina) Luciano Emanuel Ambrogi (Argentina) Matías Franco Descotte	(Argentina) Gabriel Alejandro Hidalgo (Argentina) Lorenzo Joaquín Rodríguez (Argentina) Juan Pablo Paz (Argentina) Ezequiel Simonit
October 31	Salta, Argentina; Clay; M25; Singles and Doubles Draws	(Argentina) Leonardo Aboian (Argentina) Santiago de la Fuente; 4–6, 6–4, [10–7]	(Argentina) Franco Emanuel Egea (Argentina) Gabriel Alejandro Hidalgo	(Argentina) Luciano Emanuel Ambrogi (Argentina) Matías Franco Descotte	(Argentina) Gabriel Alejandro Hidalgo (Argentina) Lorenzo Joaquín Rodríguez (Argentina) Juan Pablo Paz (Argentina) Ezequiel Simonit
October 31	Jakarta, Indonesia; Hard; M25; Singles and Doubles Draws	(Chinese Taipei) Huang Tsung-hao; 7–6^{(7–0)}, 6–4	(France) Arthur Weber	Konstantin Kravchuk (Hong Kong) Coleman Wong	(China) Sun Fajing (South Korea) Park Ui-sung (Thailand) Thanapet Chanta (Australia) Thomas Fancutt
October 31	Jakarta, Indonesia; Hard; M25; Singles and Doubles Draws	(Japan) Tomohiro Masabayashi (Japan) Seita Watanabe; 4–6, 6–4, [10–7]	(China) Sun Fajing (Hong Kong) Coleman Wong	Konstantin Kravchuk (Hong Kong) Coleman Wong	(China) Sun Fajing (South Korea) Park Ui-sung (Thailand) Thanapet Chanta (Australia) Thomas Fancutt
October 31	Jerusalem, Israel; Hard; M25; Singles and Doubles Draws	(Ukraine) Vladyslav Orlov; 1–6, 6–1, 7–5	(Poland) Filip Peliwo	(Germany) Louis Wessels (Israel) Daniel Cukierman	(United Kingdom) Joshua Paris (Israel) Sahar Simon (North Macedonia) Kalin Ivanovski (Israel) Orel Kimhi
October 31	Jerusalem, Israel; Hard; M25; Singles and Doubles Draws	(Israel) Daniel Cukierman (United Kingdom) Joshua Paris; 6–3, 6–4	(Poland) Filip Peliwo (United Kingdom) Mattias Southcombe	(Germany) Louis Wessels (Israel) Daniel Cukierman	(United Kingdom) Joshua Paris (Israel) Sahar Simon (North Macedonia) Kalin Ivanovski (Israel) Orel Kimhi
October 31	Monastir, Tunisia; Hard; M25; Singles and Doubles Draws	(France) Ugo Blanchet; 4–6, 6–3, 6–2	(France) Kyrian Jacquet	(China) Bu Yunchaokete (France) Jurgen Briand	(Poland) Kacper Żuk (Austria) Lukas Neumayer (Belgium) Gauthier Onclin (Tunisia) Skander Mansouri
October 31	Monastir, Tunisia; Hard; M25; Singles and Doubles Draws	(Chinese Taipei) Ray Ho (China) Bu Yunchaokete; 6–2, 6–4	(United Kingdom) Alastair Gray (France) Kyrian Jacquet	(China) Bu Yunchaokete (France) Jurgen Briand	(Poland) Kacper Żuk (Austria) Lukas Neumayer (Belgium) Gauthier Onclin (Tunisia) Skander Mansouri
October 31	Santa Cruz de la Sierra, Bolivia; Clay; M15; Singles and Doubles Draws	(Bolivia) Murkel Dellien; 7–6^{(7–5)}, 6–3	(Uruguay) Franco Roncadelli	(Peru) Gonzalo Bueno (Argentina) Ignacio Monzón	(Argentina) Federico Agustín Gómez (Argentina) Fermín Tenti (Bolivia) Juan Carlos Prado Ángelo (Argentina) Valerio Aboian
October 31	Santa Cruz de la Sierra, Bolivia; Clay; M15; Singles and Doubles Draws	(Peru) Conner Huertas del Pino (Argentina) Ignacio Monzón; 7–5, 6–7^{(4–7)}, [12–10]	(Peru) Gonzalo Bueno (Argentina) Federico Agustín Gómez	(Peru) Gonzalo Bueno (Argentina) Ignacio Monzón	(Argentina) Federico Agustín Gómez (Argentina) Fermín Tenti (Bolivia) Juan Carlos Prado Ángelo (Argentina) Valerio Aboian
October 31	Sharm El Sheikh, Egypt; Hard; M15; Singles and Doubles Draws	(France) Térence Atmane; 6–3, 6–4	(South Africa) Kris van Wyk	(Spain) John Echeverría (Slovenia) Bor Artnak	(Austria) Lukas Krainer; Ilia Simakin; Alexander Zgirovsky (Italy) Andrea Picchione
October 31	Sharm El Sheikh, Egypt; Hard; M15; Singles and Doubles Draws	Alexandr Binda; Ilia Simakin; 6–3, 6–3	Erik Arutiunian; Alexander Zgirovsky	(Spain) John Echeverría (Slovenia) Bor Artnak	(Austria) Lukas Krainer; Ilia Simakin; Alexander Zgirovsky (Italy) Andrea Picchione
October 31	Villers-lès-Nancy, France; Hard (indoor); M15; Singles and Doubles Draws	(France) Dan Added; 6–4, 5–7, 6–2	(France) Boris Fassbender	(Netherlands) Alec Deckers (France) Lilian Marmousez	(Germany) Tom Gentzsch (Morocco) Adam Moundir (France) Arthur Bouquier (Uzbekistan) Khumoyun Sultanov
October 31	Villers-lès-Nancy, France; Hard (indoor); M15; Singles and Doubles Draws	(United Kingdom) Scott Duncan (United Kingdom) Marcus Willis; 6–1, 2–0, ret.	(France) Arthur Bouquier (France) Grégoire Jacq	(Netherlands) Alec Deckers (France) Lilian Marmousez	(Germany) Tom Gentzsch (Morocco) Adam Moundir (France) Arthur Bouquier (Uzbekistan) Khumoyun Sultanov
October 31	Heraklion, Greece; Hard; M15; Singles and Doubles Draws	(Denmark) Elmer Møller; 6–3, 7–5	(Netherlands) Sidané Pontjodikromo	(France) Benjamin Pietri (Australia) Matthew Dellavedova	(United States) Michael Zhu (Czech Republic) Jakub Nicod (Italy) Simone Roncalli (Greece) Alexandros Skorilas
October 31	Heraklion, Greece; Hard; M15; Singles and Doubles Draws	(Poland) Szymon Kielan (Ukraine) Volodymyr Uzhylovskyi; 7–5, 6–1	(Germany) Kai Lemstra (Germany) Marlon Vankan	(France) Benjamin Pietri (Australia) Matthew Dellavedova	(United States) Michael Zhu (Czech Republic) Jakub Nicod (Italy) Simone Roncalli (Greece) Alexandros Skorilas
October 31	New Delhi, India; Hard; M15; Singles and Doubles Draws	(India) Digvijay Pratap Singh; 6–2, ret	(France) Florent Bax	(United States) Oliver Crawford (India) Niki Kaliyanda Poonacha	(India) Siddharth Vishwakarma (India) Nitin Kumar Sinha (India) Faisal Qamar (India) Karan Singh
October 31	New Delhi, India; Hard; M15; Singles and Doubles Draws	(India) Rithvik Choudary Bollipalli (India) Niki Kaliyanda Poonacha; 7–6^{(7–4)}, 6–2	(India) Nitin Kumar Sinha (India) Vishnu Vardhan	(United States) Oliver Crawford (India) Niki Kaliyanda Poonacha	(India) Siddharth Vishwakarma (India) Nitin Kumar Sinha (India) Faisal Qamar (India) Karan Singh
October 31	Sëlva, Italy; Hard (indoor); M15; Singles and Doubles Draws	(Austria) Sandro Kopp; 6–3, 7–6^{(8–6)}	(Germany) Leopold Zima	(Italy) Federico Bertuccioli (Germany) Robert Strombachs	(Italy) Carlo Alberto Fossati (Italy) Tommaso Compagnucci (Netherlands) Mick Veldheer (Germany) Niklas Schell
October 31	Sëlva, Italy; Hard (indoor); M15; Singles and Doubles Draws	(Germany) Robert Strombachs (Germany) Leopold Zima; 6–4, 6–4	(Germany) Lewie Lane (Netherlands) Mick Veldheer	(Italy) Federico Bertuccioli (Germany) Robert Strombachs	(Italy) Carlo Alberto Fossati (Italy) Tommaso Compagnucci (Netherlands) Mick Veldheer (Germany) Niklas Schell
October 31	Al Zahra, Kuwait; Hard; M15; Singles and Doubles Draws	(Turkey) Yankı Erel; 6–3, 1–6, 6–3	(Estonia) Kristjan Tamm	Bekhan Atlangeriev (United Kingdom) William Jansen	(Georgia (country)) Aleksandre Bakshi (Germany) Benedikt Henning (Germany) Facundo Yunis (France) Antoine Vincent
October 31	Al Zahra, Kuwait; Hard; M15; Singles and Doubles Draws	(United Kingdom) William Jansen (Poland) Borys Zgoła; 7–5, 1–0, ret.	(India) Lohithaksha Bathrinath (Thailand) Pruchya Isaro	Bekhan Atlangeriev (United Kingdom) William Jansen	(Georgia (country)) Aleksandre Bakshi (Germany) Benedikt Henning (Germany) Facundo Yunis (France) Antoine Vincent
October 31	Monastir, Tunisia; Hard; M15; Singles and Doubles Draws	(Belgium) Simon Beaupain; 7–5, 6–3	(Italy) Andrea Bacaloni	(Bulgaria) Alexander Donski (China) Wang Xiaofei	(Germany) Maik Steiner (France) Raphaël Lambling (France) Alexis Boureau (Slovakia) Peter Benjamín Privara
October 31	Monastir, Tunisia; Hard; M15; Singles and Doubles Draws	(France) Constantin Bittoun Kouzmine (Thailand) Maximus Jones; 6–1, 4–6, [10–7]	(Germany) Jannik Opitz (Germany) Maik Steiner	(Bulgaria) Alexander Donski (China) Wang Xiaofei	(Germany) Maik Steiner (France) Raphaël Lambling (France) Alexis Boureau (Slovakia) Peter Benjamín Privara
October 31	Antalya, Turkey; Clay; M15; Singles and Doubles Draws	(Montenegro) Rrezart Cungu; 4–6, 6–3, 6–1	(United States) Bruno Kuzuhara	(Spain) Benjamín Winter López (Romania) Alexandru Jecan	(Poland) Daniel Michalski; Bogdan Bobrov (France) Corentin Denolly (Mexico) Rodrigo Pacheco Méndez
October 31	Antalya, Turkey; Clay; M15; Singles and Doubles Draws	(Romania) Alexandru Jecan (Germany) Timo Stodder; 6–4, 6–2	(Ukraine) Oleg Prihodko (Moldova) Ilya Snițari	(Spain) Benjamín Winter López (Romania) Alexandru Jecan	(Poland) Daniel Michalski; Bogdan Bobrov (France) Corentin Denolly (Mexico) Rodrigo Pacheco Méndez
October 31	Ithaca, United States; Hard (indoor); M15; Singles and Doubles Draws	(Japan) Shunsuke Mitsui; 6–4, 6–2	(Cyprus) Menelaos Efstathiou	(Republic of Ireland) Osgar O'Hoisin (United States) Toby Kodat	(United States) Sekou Bangoura (France) Damien Salvestre (United States) Braden Shick (United States) John McNally
October 31	Ithaca, United States; Hard (indoor); M15; Singles and Doubles Draws	(United States) John McNally (Japan) Shunsuke Mitsui; 6–3, 6–2	(Cyprus) Menelaos Efstathiou (Germany) Jakob Schnaitter	(Republic of Ireland) Osgar O'Hoisin (United States) Toby Kodat	(United States) Sekou Bangoura (France) Damien Salvestre (United States) Braden Shick (United States) John McNally
October 31	Fayetteville, United States; Hard; M15; Singles and Doubles Draws	(United Kingdom) Toby Samuel; 6–3, 6–3	(United States) Learner Tien	(United States) Aidan Kim (Sweden) Olle Wallin	(Moldova) Alexander Cozbinov (United Kingdom) Blu Baker (Denmark) Christian Sigsgaard (Denmark) Johannes Ingildsen
October 31	Fayetteville, United States; Hard; M15; Singles and Doubles Draws	(United States) George Goldhoff (United States) Tyler Zink; 1–6, 6–4, [10–2]	(Denmark) Johannes Ingildsen (Denmark) Christian Sigsgaard	(United States) Aidan Kim (Sweden) Olle Wallin	(Moldova) Alexander Cozbinov (United Kingdom) Blu Baker (Denmark) Christian Sigsgaard (Denmark) Johannes Ingildsen

=== November ===
Week of	Tournament	Winner	Runners-up	Semifinalists	Quarterfinalists
November 7	Sharm El Sheikh, Egypt; Hard; M25; Singles and Doubles Draws	(Poland) Kacper Żuk; 6–4, 6–4	(United Kingdom) Alastair Gray	(United Kingdom) Stuart Parker (South Korea) Jeong Yeong-seok	(South Africa) Kris van Wyk; Daniil Ostapenkov (Italy) Jacopo Berrettini (Uzbekistan) Sergey Fomin
November 7	Sharm El Sheikh, Egypt; Hard; M25; Singles and Doubles Draws	(South Korea) Park Ui-sung (South Korea) Jeong Yeong-seok; 6–1, 7–6^{(11–9)}	(Italy) Jacopo Berrettini (Italy) Francesco Forti	(United Kingdom) Stuart Parker (South Korea) Jeong Yeong-seok	(South Africa) Kris van Wyk; Daniil Ostapenkov (Italy) Jacopo Berrettini (Uzbekistan) Sergey Fomin
November 7	Indore, India; Hard; M25; Singles and Doubles Draws	(United States) Oliver Crawford; 6–1, 1–6, 6–3	(Czech Republic) Dominik Palán	(South Korea) Woobin Shin (South Korea) Jang Yunseok	(Japan) Kazuki Nishiwaki (India) Vishnu Vardhan (India) Dalwinder Singh (India) Sidharth Rawat
November 7	Indore, India; Hard; M25; Singles and Doubles Draws	(India) Rithvik Choudary Bollipalli (India) Niki Kaliyanda Poonacha; 7–6^{(7–4)}, 6–3	(Serbia) Boris Butulija (India) Vishnu Vardhan	(South Korea) Woobin Shin (South Korea) Jang Yunseok	(Japan) Kazuki Nishiwaki (India) Vishnu Vardhan (India) Dalwinder Singh (India) Sidharth Rawat
November 7	Antalya, Turkey; Clay; M25; Singles and Doubles Draws	(Spain) Alejandro Moro Cañas; 7–5, 3–6, 7–6^{(7–4)}	(Germany) Timo Stodder	(Morocco) Yassine Dlimi (Romania) Dan Alexandru Tomescu	(Bosnia and Herzegovina) Nerman Fatić (Moldova) Ilya Snițari; Denis Klok (Poland) Daniel Michalski
November 7	Antalya, Turkey; Clay; M25; Singles and Doubles Draws	(Ukraine) Oleg Prihodko (Moldova) Ilya Snițari; 6–3, 6–2	(Romania) Alexandru Jecan (Romania) Dan Alexandru Tomescu	(Morocco) Yassine Dlimi (Romania) Dan Alexandru Tomescu	(Bosnia and Herzegovina) Nerman Fatić (Moldova) Ilya Snițari; Denis Klok (Poland) Daniel Michalski
November 7	Austin, United States; Hard; M25; Singles and Doubles Draws	(United States) Micah Braswell; 6–2, 6–2	(Ecuador) Andrés Andrade	(United States) Colin Markes (Denmark) Christian Sigsgaard	(Australia) Bernard Tomic (Moldova) Alexander Cozbinov (United States) Eric Hadigian (United Kingdom) Jack Pinnington Jones
November 7	Austin, United States; Hard; M25; Singles and Doubles Draws	(South Africa) Philip Henning (United States) Tyler Stewart; 6–2, 6–4	(France) Martin Breysach (Greece) Demetris Azoides	(United States) Colin Markes (Denmark) Christian Sigsgaard	(Australia) Bernard Tomic (Moldova) Alexander Cozbinov (United States) Eric Hadigian (United Kingdom) Jack Pinnington Jones
November 7	Córdoba, Argentina; Clay; M15; Singles and Doubles Draws	(Chile) Gonzalo Lama; 6–2, 3–6, 7–6^{(7–3)}	(Argentina) Matías Franco Descotte	(Argentina) Valerio Aboian (Argentina) Gabriel Alejandro Hidalgo	(Argentina) Leonardo Aboian (Argentina) Ignacio Monzón (Argentina) Luciano Emanuel Ambrogi (Bolivia) Murkel Dellien
November 7	Córdoba, Argentina; Clay; M15; Singles and Doubles Draws	(Argentina) Lorenzo Gagliardo (Argentina) Tomás Farjat; 6–4, 6–1	(Argentina) Leonardo Aboian (Argentina) Ignacio Monzón	(Argentina) Valerio Aboian (Argentina) Gabriel Alejandro Hidalgo	(Argentina) Leonardo Aboian (Argentina) Ignacio Monzón (Argentina) Luciano Emanuel Ambrogi (Bolivia) Murkel Dellien
November 7	Heraklion, Greece; Hard; M15; Singles and Doubles Draws	(Netherlands) Alec Deckers; 6–4, 6–2	(France) Térence Atmane	(Germany) Florian Broska (Uzbekistan) Khumoyun Sultanov	(Poland) Martyn Pawelski (Austria) Sandro Kopp (Romania) Sebastian Gima (Australia) Matthew Dellavedova
November 7	Heraklion, Greece; Hard; M15; Singles and Doubles Draws	(Ukraine) Volodymyr Uzhylovskyi (Poland) Szymon Kielan; 7–6^{(8–6)}, 7–5	(Uzbekistan) Khumoyun Sultanov (Croatia) Domagoj Bilješko	(Germany) Florian Broska (Uzbekistan) Khumoyun Sultanov	(Poland) Martyn Pawelski (Austria) Sandro Kopp (Romania) Sebastian Gima (Australia) Matthew Dellavedova
November 7	Lima, Peru; Clay; M15; Singles and Doubles Draws	(Peru) Gonzalo Bueno; 6–4, 6–1	(Peru) Ignacio Buse	(Brazil) Mateo Barreiros Reyes (Ecuador) Álvaro Guillén Meza	(Peru) Jorge Panta (Brazil) Vítor Leal (Peru) Conner Huertas del Pino (Peru) Arklon Huertas del Pino
November 7	Lima, Peru; Clay; M15; Singles and Doubles Draws	(Peru) Christopher Li (Peru) Gianluca Ballotta; 6–7^{(6–8)}, 6–3, [10–6]	(Brazil) Igor Gimenez (Brazil) Paulo André Saraiva dos Santos	(Brazil) Mateo Barreiros Reyes (Ecuador) Álvaro Guillén Meza	(Peru) Jorge Panta (Brazil) Vítor Leal (Peru) Conner Huertas del Pino (Peru) Arklon Huertas del Pino
November 7	Benicarló, Spain; Clay; M15; Singles and Doubles Draws	(Spain) Álvaro López San Martín; 7–5, 6–4	(Spain) Carlos López Montagud	(Spain) Àlex Martí Pujolràs (Ukraine) Georgii Kravchenko	(France) Arthur Reymond (Spain) Carlos Sánchez Jover (Spain) Bruno Pujol Navarro; Andrey Chepelev
November 7	Benicarló, Spain; Clay; M15; Singles and Doubles Draws	(Lithuania) Edas Butvilas (Spain) Alejandro Manzanera Pertusa; 6–2, 6–2	(Switzerland) Noah Lopez (Spain) David Naharro	(Spain) Àlex Martí Pujolràs (Ukraine) Georgii Kravchenko	(France) Arthur Reymond (Spain) Carlos Sánchez Jover (Spain) Bruno Pujol Navarro; Andrey Chepelev
November 7	Monastir, Tunisia; Hard; M15; Singles and Doubles Draws	(Spain) Adrià Soriano Barrera; 6–3, 6–3	(France) Robin Bertrand	(Mexico) Alan Fernando Rubio Fierros (Germany) Luca Wiedenmann	(France) Thomas Deschamps; Mikalai Haliak (Italy) Marco Brugnerotto (Italy) Andrea Picchione
November 7	Monastir, Tunisia; Hard; M15; Singles and Doubles Draws	(France) Constantin Bittoun Kouzmine (Thailand) Maximus Jones; 6–7^{(3–7)}, 6–3, [10–6]	(Germany) Maik Steiner (Germany) Jannik Opitz	(Mexico) Alan Fernando Rubio Fierros (Germany) Luca Wiedenmann	(France) Thomas Deschamps; Mikalai Haliak (Italy) Marco Brugnerotto (Italy) Andrea Picchione
November 7	Winston-Salem, United States; Hard (i); M15; Singles and Doubles Draws	(United Kingdom) Toby Samuel; 6–1, 7–5	(United States) Alex Michelsen	(Spain) Pedro Ródenas (France) Robin Catry	(United Kingdom) James Story (Luxembourg) Alex Knaff (United States) Eduardo Nava (Canada) Taha Baadi
November 7	Winston-Salem, United States; Hard (i); M15; Singles and Doubles Draws	(United Kingdom) Ben Jones (United Kingdom) Toby Samuel; 6–3, 6–1	(France) Robin Catry (Switzerland) Luca Staeheli	(Spain) Pedro Ródenas (France) Robin Catry	(United Kingdom) James Story (Luxembourg) Alex Knaff (United States) Eduardo Nava (Canada) Taha Baadi
November 14	Traralgon, Australia; Hard; M25; Singles and Doubles Draws	(Australia) Edward Winter; 6–4, 6–2	(Australia) Tristan Schoolkate	(Australia) Omar Jasika (United States) Kyle Seelig	(New Zealand) Rubin Statham (Australia) Luke Saville (Australia) Blake Mott (Australia) Dayne Kelly
November 14	Traralgon, Australia; Hard; M25; Singles and Doubles Draws	(Australia) Jeremy Beale (Australia) James Frawley; 6–3, 6–4	(Australia) Adam Taylor (United Kingdom) Mark Whitehouse	(Australia) Omar Jasika (United States) Kyle Seelig	(New Zealand) Rubin Statham (Australia) Luke Saville (Australia) Blake Mott (Australia) Dayne Kelly
November 14	Sharm El Sheikh, Egypt; Hard; M25; Singles and Doubles Draws	(Czech Republic) Marek Gengel; 6–3, 6–1	(Egypt) Amr Elsayed	(China) Bu Yunchaokete (Egypt) Karim-Mohamed Maamoun	(Germany) Sebastian Prechtel (South Africa) Kris van Wyk (South Korea) Jeong Yeong-seok (Kazakhstan) Denis Yevseyev
November 14	Sharm El Sheikh, Egypt; Hard; M25; Singles and Doubles Draws	(Czech Republic) Marek Gengel (Germany) Mats Rosenkranz; 6–2, 7–5	Alexander Zgirovsky (South Africa) Kris van Wyk	(China) Bu Yunchaokete (Egypt) Karim-Mohamed Maamoun	(Germany) Sebastian Prechtel (South Africa) Kris van Wyk (South Korea) Jeong Yeong-seok (Kazakhstan) Denis Yevseyev
November 14	Heraklion, Greece; Hard; M25; Singles and Doubles Draws	(Czech Republic) Jakub Menšík; 6–4, 7–6^{(7–4)}	(Ukraine) Oleksandr Ovcharenko	(France) Térence Atmane (France) Titouan Droguet	(Austria) Sandro Kopp (Australia) Matthew Dellavedova (Israel) Daniel Cukierman (Poland) Filip Peliwo
November 14	Heraklion, Greece; Hard; M25; Singles and Doubles Draws	(Austria) Neil Oberleitner (Austria) Sandro Kopp; 6–7^{(2–7)}, 6–3, [10–7]	(Bulgaria) Alexander Donski (Germany) Tim Sandkaulen	(France) Térence Atmane (France) Titouan Droguet	(Austria) Sandro Kopp (Australia) Matthew Dellavedova (Israel) Daniel Cukierman (Poland) Filip Peliwo
November 14	Mumbai, India; Hard; M25; Singles and Doubles Draws	(Czech Republic) Dominik Palán; 6–4, 6–4	(Japan) Ryuki Matsuda	(United States) Oliver Crawford (India) Digvijay Pratap Singh	(India) Niki Kaliyanda Poonacha (Japan) Kazuki Nishiwaki (India) Siddharth Vishwakarma (India) Sidharth Rawat
November 14	Mumbai, India; Hard; M25; Singles and Doubles Draws	(India) Niki Kaliyanda Poonacha (India) Rithvik Choudary Bollipalli; 6–2, 6–2	(Ukraine) Vladyslav Orlov (India) Vishnu Vardhan	(United States) Oliver Crawford (India) Digvijay Pratap Singh	(India) Niki Kaliyanda Poonacha (Japan) Kazuki Nishiwaki (India) Siddharth Vishwakarma (India) Sidharth Rawat
November 14	Columbus, United States; Hard (i); M25; Singles and Doubles Draws	(United States) Alexander Bernard; 2–6, 6–1, 3–1, ret	(Czech Republic) Matěj Vocel	(Moldova) Alexander Cozbinov (United States) John McNally	(United States) Cannon Kingsley (United States) James Tracy (United States) Jack Anthrop (United States) Aidan Mayo
November 14	Columbus, United States; Hard (i); M25; Singles and Doubles Draws	(United States) John McNally (United States) Eduardo Nava; 6–4, 6–4	(Australia) Joshua Charlton (United States) Quinn Vandecasteele	(Moldova) Alexander Cozbinov (United States) John McNally	(United States) Cannon Kingsley (United States) James Tracy (United States) Jack Anthrop (United States) Aidan Mayo
November 14	Luján, Argentina; Clay; M15; Singles and Doubles Draws	(Argentina) Matías Franco Descotte; 6–4, 2–6, 6–3	(Argentina) Lorenzo Joaquín Rodríguez	(Argentina) Santiago de la Fuente (Argentina) Gabriel Alejandro Hidalgo	(Argentina) Federico Agustín Gómez (Argentina) Guido Iván Justo (Chile) Nicolás Bruna (Argentina) Tomás Farjat
November 14	Luján, Argentina; Clay; M15; Singles and Doubles Draws	(Argentina) Juan Ignacio Galarza (Argentina) Tomás Lipovšek Puches; 6–4, 5–7, [13–11]	(Argentina) Lorenzo Gagliardo (Uruguay) Franco Roncadelli	(Argentina) Santiago de la Fuente (Argentina) Gabriel Alejandro Hidalgo	(Argentina) Federico Agustín Gómez (Argentina) Guido Iván Justo (Chile) Nicolás Bruna (Argentina) Tomás Farjat
November 14	Lima, Peru; Clay; M15; Singles and Doubles Draws	(United States) Victor Lilov; 2–6, 6–3, 6–1	(Peru) Jorge Panta	(Peru) Conner Huertas del Pino (Peru) Arklon Huertas del Pino	(Argentina) Tobías Franco (Chile) Daniel Antonio Núñez (Uruguay) Ignacio Carou (Colombia) Daniel Salazar
November 14	Lima, Peru; Clay; M15; Singles and Doubles Draws	(Peru) Conner Huertas del Pino (Peru) Jorge Panta; Walkover	(Chile) Miguel Fernando Pereira (Uruguay) Ignacio Carou	(Peru) Conner Huertas del Pino (Peru) Arklon Huertas del Pino	(Argentina) Tobías Franco (Chile) Daniel Antonio Núñez (Uruguay) Ignacio Carou (Colombia) Daniel Salazar
November 14	Monastir, Tunisia; Hard; M15; Singles and Doubles Draws	(Germany) Robert Strombachs; 6–1, 6–2	(Poland) Olaf Pieczkowski	(Italy) Andrea Picchione (Italy) Andrea Guerrieri	(Bosnia and Herzegovina) Aziz Kijametović (France) Antoine Ghibaudo (Belgium) Gilles-Arnaud Bailly (Spain) Bruno Pujol Navarro
November 14	Monastir, Tunisia; Hard; M15; Singles and Doubles Draws	(Chinese Taipei) Ray Ho (Thailand) Maximus Jones; 4–6, 7–6^{(7–3)}, [10–5]	(Germany) Robert Strombachs (Poland) Olaf Pieczkowski	(Italy) Andrea Picchione (Italy) Andrea Guerrieri	(Bosnia and Herzegovina) Aziz Kijametović (France) Antoine Ghibaudo (Belgium) Gilles-Arnaud Bailly (Spain) Bruno Pujol Navarro
November 14	Antalya, Turkey; Clay; M15; Singles and Doubles Draws	(Italy) Alexander Weis; 6–4, 6–4	(Germany) Timo Stodder	(Poland) Daniel Michalski (Spain) Jorge Martínez Martínez	(Romania) Alexandru Jecan (Montenegro) Rrezart Cungu (Italy) Davide Galoppini (Serbia) Branko Đurić
November 14	Antalya, Turkey; Clay; M15; Singles and Doubles Draws	(Romania) Alexandru Jecan (Romania) Dan Alexandru Tomescu; 6–4, 6–3	Timur Kiyamov; Bogdan Bobrov	(Poland) Daniel Michalski (Spain) Jorge Martínez Martínez	(Romania) Alexandru Jecan (Montenegro) Rrezart Cungu (Italy) Davide Galoppini (Serbia) Branko Đurić
November 14	East Lansing, United States; Hard (i); M15; Singles and Doubles Draws	(United States) Alex Michelsen; 7–6^{(7–2)}, 6–1	(United States) Alexander Kotzen	(Australia) Mitchell Harper (United States) Ronald Hohmann	(Luxembourg) Alex Knaff (United Kingdom) Ben Jones (United States) David Saye (United States) Ozan Baris
November 14	East Lansing, United States; Hard (i); M15; Singles and Doubles Draws	(United States) Alex Michelsen (United States) Learner Tien; 6–4, 6–3	(United Kingdom) Joshua Goodger (United Kingdom) Emile Hudd	(Australia) Mitchell Harper (United States) Ronald Hohmann	(Luxembourg) Alex Knaff (United Kingdom) Ben Jones (United States) David Saye (United States) Ozan Baris
November 14	Boca Raton, United States; Clay; M15; Singles and Doubles Draws	(United Kingdom) Blu Baker; 7–6^{(7–4)}, 6–2	(Sweden) Arvid Nordquist	(Sweden) Lucas Renard (Dominican Republic) Roberto Cid Subervi	(The Bahamas) Justin Roberts (Belgium) Martin Katz (United States) Axel Nefve (Colombia) Juan Manuel Benitez Chavarriaga
November 14	Boca Raton, United States; Clay; M15; Singles and Doubles Draws	(United Kingdom) Finn Murgett (United Kingdom) Blu Baker; 3–6, 7–6^{(7–3)}, [10–8]	(Morocco) Younes Lalami Laaroussi (Venezuela) Brandon Pérez	(Sweden) Lucas Renard (Dominican Republic) Roberto Cid Subervi	(The Bahamas) Justin Roberts (Belgium) Martin Katz (United States) Axel Nefve (Colombia) Juan Manuel Benitez Chavarriaga
November 21	Traralgon, Australia; Hard; M25; Singles and Doubles Draws	(Australia) Omar Jasika; 6–0, 6–2	(Australia) Dayne Kelly	(New Zealand) Ajeet Rai (Australia) Alex Bolt	(United Kingdom) Mark Whitehouse (United States) Kyle Seelig (Australia) Jeremy Jin (New Zealand) Rubin Statham
November 21	Traralgon, Australia; Hard; M25; Singles and Doubles Draws	(Australia) James Frawley (Australia) Jeremy Beale; 6–3, 6–2	(Australia) Matthew Romios (Australia) Calum Puttergill	(New Zealand) Ajeet Rai (Australia) Alex Bolt	(United Kingdom) Mark Whitehouse (United States) Kyle Seelig (Australia) Jeremy Jin (New Zealand) Rubin Statham
November 21	Lajeado, Brazil; Clay; M25; Singles and Doubles Draws	(Brazil) Eduardo Ribeiro; 6–2, 6–2	(Brazil) Marcelo Zormann	(Brazil) Nicolas Zanellato (Brazil) Gustavo Heide	(Brazil) Guilherme Clezar (Brazil) Fernando Yamacita (Argentina) Ignacio Monzón (Brazil) João Victor Couto Loureiro
November 21	Lajeado, Brazil; Clay; M25; Singles and Doubles Draws	(Brazil) Orlando Luz (Brazil) Marcelo Zormann; 6–3, 6–2	(Brazil) João Victor Couto Loureiro (Brazil) Gustavo Heide	(Brazil) Nicolas Zanellato (Brazil) Gustavo Heide	(Brazil) Guilherme Clezar (Brazil) Fernando Yamacita (Argentina) Ignacio Monzón (Brazil) João Victor Couto Loureiro
November 21	Heraklion, Greece; Hard; M25; Singles and Doubles Draws	(France) Térence Atmane; 6–3, 2–6, 6–4	(Israel) Daniel Cukierman	(Ukraine) Oleksandr Ovcharenko (Poland) Filip Peliwo	(Australia) Matthew Dellavedova (Bulgaria) Simon Anthony Ivanov (Netherlands) Mick Veldheer (Greece) Alexandros Skorilas
November 21	Heraklion, Greece; Hard; M25; Singles and Doubles Draws	(Germany) Tim Sandkaulen (Austria) Neil Oberleitner; 6–2, 7–6^{(7–5)}	(Israel) Daniel Cukierman (Ukraine) Volodymyr Uzhylovskyi	(Ukraine) Oleksandr Ovcharenko (Poland) Filip Peliwo	(Australia) Matthew Dellavedova (Bulgaria) Simon Anthony Ivanov (Netherlands) Mick Veldheer (Greece) Alexandros Skorilas
November 21	Monastir, Tunisia; Hard; M25; Singles and Doubles Draws	(Tunisia) Skander Mansouri; 6–3, 6–4	(United States) Omni Kumar	(China) Bu Yunchaokete (Tunisia) Aziz Dougaz	(Belgium) Gilles-Arnaud Bailly (Portugal) Jaime Faria (Portugal) Francisco Rocha (United Kingdom) Alastair Gray
November 21	Monastir, Tunisia; Hard; M25; Singles and Doubles Draws	(Italy) Luca Potenza (France) Arthur Bouquier; 6–2, 6–2	(Chinese Taipei) Ray Ho (China) Bu Yunchaokete	(China) Bu Yunchaokete (Tunisia) Aziz Dougaz	(Belgium) Gilles-Arnaud Bailly (Portugal) Jaime Faria (Portugal) Francisco Rocha (United Kingdom) Alastair Gray
November 21	Santo Domingo, Dominican Republic; Hard; M15; Singles and Doubles Draws	(Australia) Bernard Tomic; 6–3, 4–6, 6–3	(Barbados) Darian King	(Canada) Liam Draxl (Dominican Republic) Peter Bertran	(United States) Toby Kodat (Dominican Republic) Roberto Cid Subervi (Netherlands) Guy den Ouden (Costa Rica) Jesse Flores
November 21	Santo Domingo, Dominican Republic; Hard; M15; Singles and Doubles Draws	(Canada) Liam Draxl (Costa Rica) Jesse Flores; 6–0, 6–3	(Dominican Republic) Peter Bertran (United States) Joshua Sheehy	(Canada) Liam Draxl (Dominican Republic) Peter Bertran	(United States) Toby Kodat (Dominican Republic) Roberto Cid Subervi (Netherlands) Guy den Ouden (Costa Rica) Jesse Flores
November 21	Sharm El Sheikh, Egypt; Hard; M15; Singles and Doubles Draws	(Czech Republic) Jakub Menšík; 6–4, 6–2	(Georgia (country)) Saba Purtseladze	(Austria) Lukas Krainer (Italy) Jacopo Berrettini	(Germany) Mats Rosenkranz (Slovakia) Tomáš Lánik (South Africa) Kris van Wyk (Germany) Robert Strombachs
November 21	Sharm El Sheikh, Egypt; Hard; M15; Singles and Doubles Draws	Erik Arutiunian; Daniil Ostapenkov; 6–3, 6–4	(Austria) Lukas Krainer (Germany) Robert Strombachs	(Austria) Lukas Krainer (Italy) Jacopo Berrettini	(Germany) Mats Rosenkranz (Slovakia) Tomáš Lánik (South Africa) Kris van Wyk (Germany) Robert Strombachs
November 21	Bhilai, India; Hard; M15; Singles and Doubles Draws	(Ukraine) Vladyslav Orlov; 6–1, 6–4	(India) Niki Kaliyanda Poonacha	(Japan) Ryotaro Matsumura (India) Karan Singh	(India) Ranjeet Virali-Murugesan (India) Rishi Reddy (Japan) Ryuki Matsuda (India) Dalwinder Singh
November 21	Bhilai, India; Hard; M15; Singles and Doubles Draws	(India) Niki Kaliyanda Poonacha (India) Rithvik Choudary Bollipalli; 7–6^{(9–7)}, 6–1	(India) Sai Karteek Reddy Ganta (India) Rishab Agarwal	(Japan) Ryotaro Matsumura (India) Karan Singh	(India) Ranjeet Virali-Murugesan (India) Rishi Reddy (Japan) Ryuki Matsuda (India) Dalwinder Singh
November 21	Madrid, Spain; Hard; M15; Singles and Doubles Draws	(Spain) David Jordà Sanchis; 6–3, 6–1	(Paraguay) Daniel Vallejo	(Spain) Benjamín Winter López (Germany) Tim Handel	(Spain) John Echeverría (Morocco) Adam Moundir (Netherlands) Sidané Pontjodikromo (North Macedonia) Kalin Ivanovski
November 21	Madrid, Spain; Hard; M15; Singles and Doubles Draws	(Germany) Jimmy Yang (Morocco) Adam Moundir; 6–3, 3–6, [10–5]	(Netherlands) Sidané Pontjodikromo (Netherlands) Dax Donders	(Spain) Benjamín Winter López (Germany) Tim Handel	(Spain) John Echeverría (Morocco) Adam Moundir (Netherlands) Sidané Pontjodikromo (North Macedonia) Kalin Ivanovski
November 21	Monastir, Tunisia; Hard; M15; Singles and Doubles Draws	(France) Constantin Bittoun Kouzmine; 6–1, 6–4	(Netherlands) Jarno Jans	(Italy) Luca Tomasetto (Switzerland) Gabriele Moghini	(Italy) Stefano Battaglino (Italy) Luca Giacomini (France) Valentin Lapalu (Jordan) Mousa Alkotop
November 21	Monastir, Tunisia; Hard; M15; Singles and Doubles Draws	(Germany) Kai Wehnelt (France) Constantin Bittoun Kouzmine; 7–6^{(7–2)}, 6–7^{(8–10)}, [10–4]	(Netherlands) Jarno Jans (Portugal) Tiago Pereira	(Italy) Luca Tomasetto (Switzerland) Gabriele Moghini	(Italy) Stefano Battaglino (Italy) Luca Giacomini (France) Valentin Lapalu (Jordan) Mousa Alkotop
November 21	Antalya, Turkey; Clay; M15; Singles and Doubles Draws	(Italy) Alexander Weis; 6–4, 6–0	(Spain) Àlex Martí Pujolràs	Bogdan Bobrov (Spain) Jorge Martínez Martínez	(Germany) Louis Wessels (Ukraine) Oleg Prihodko (Moldova) Ilya Snițari (Romania) Alexandru Jecan
November 21	Antalya, Turkey; Clay; M15; Singles and Doubles Draws	(Romania) Cezar Crețu (Romania) Alexandru Jecan; 6–4, 7–6^{(9–7)}	(Ukraine) Oleg Prihodko (Moldova) Ilya Snițari	Bogdan Bobrov (Spain) Jorge Martínez Martínez	(Germany) Louis Wessels (Ukraine) Oleg Prihodko (Moldova) Ilya Snițari (Romania) Alexandru Jecan
November 28	Vacaria, Brazil; Clay (i); M25; Singles and Doubles Draws	(Argentina) Román Andrés Burruchaga; 0–6, 6–4, 6–0	(Brazil) Orlando Luz	(Brazil) Gustavo Heide (Brazil) Eduardo Ribeiro	(Brazil) Mateus Alves (Brazil) Marcelo Zormann (Brazil) João Victor Couto Loureiro (Chile) Gonzalo Lama
November 28	Vacaria, Brazil; Clay (i); M25; Singles and Doubles Draws	(Brazil) Gustavo Heide (Brazil) João Victor Couto Loureiro; 3–6, 7–6^{(7–5)}, [10–5]	(Kazakhstan) Grigoriy Lomakin (Brazil) Igor Gimenez	(Brazil) Gustavo Heide (Brazil) Eduardo Ribeiro	(Brazil) Mateus Alves (Brazil) Marcelo Zormann (Brazil) João Victor Couto Loureiro (Chile) Gonzalo Lama
November 28	Trnava, Slovakia; Hard (i); M25; Singles and Doubles Draws	(Czech Republic) Marek Gengel; 6–7^{(6–8)}, 6–3, 6–3	(Spain) Daniel Rincón	(Bosnia and Herzegovina) Mirza Bašić (Belgium) Tibo Colson	(Austria) Sandro Kopp (Germany) Mats Rosenkranz (Czech Republic) Michael Vrbenský (Czech Republic) David Poljak
November 28	Trnava, Slovakia; Hard (i); M25; Singles and Doubles Draws	(Netherlands) Mick Veldheer (Netherlands) Mats Hermans; 1–6, 6–3, [10–8]	(Paraguay) Daniel Vallejo (Spain) Daniel Rincón	(Bosnia and Herzegovina) Mirza Bašić (Belgium) Tibo Colson	(Austria) Sandro Kopp (Germany) Mats Rosenkranz (Czech Republic) Michael Vrbenský (Czech Republic) David Poljak
November 28	Monastir, Tunisia; Hard; M25; Singles and Doubles Draws	(Estonia) Mark Lajal; 6–4, 6–1	(China) Bu Yunchaokete	(Tunisia) Skander Mansouri (Tunisia) Aziz Dougaz	(Bulgaria) Alexander Donski (France) Arthur Bouquier (Germany) Christoph Negritu (United States) Omni Kumar
November 28	Monastir, Tunisia; Hard; M25; Singles and Doubles Draws	(France) Arthur Bouquier (Austria) Neil Oberleitner; 6–1, 6–4	(China) Bu Yunchaokete (Chinese Taipei) Ray Ho	(Tunisia) Skander Mansouri (Tunisia) Aziz Dougaz	(Bulgaria) Alexander Donski (France) Arthur Bouquier (Germany) Christoph Negritu (United States) Omni Kumar
November 28	Santo Domingo, Dominican Republic; Hard; M15; Singles and Doubles Draws	(Dominican Republic) Nick Hardt; 6–4, 6–3	(Canada) Liam Draxl	(United States) Victor Lilov (Barbados) Darian King	(Netherlands) Guy den Ouden (Dominican Republic) Roberto Cid Subervi (Dominican Republic) Peter Bertran (Japan) Kosuke Ogura
November 28	Santo Domingo, Dominican Republic; Hard; M15; Singles and Doubles Draws	(United States) Trey Hilderbrand (United States) Noah Schachter; 6–3, 6–4	(United States) Joshua Sheehy (Costa Rica) Jesse Flores	(United States) Victor Lilov (Barbados) Darian King	(Netherlands) Guy den Ouden (Dominican Republic) Roberto Cid Subervi (Dominican Republic) Peter Bertran (Japan) Kosuke Ogura
November 28	Sharm El Sheikh, Egypt; Hard; M15; Singles and Doubles Draws	(Czech Republic) Jakub Menšík; 6–4, 6–0	(Germany) Robert Strombachs	(Czech Republic) Vojtěch Petr (Austria) Lukas Krainer	(Cyprus) Petros Chrysochos (South Africa) Kris van Wyk; Ilia Simakin (Egypt) Amr Elsayed
November 28	Sharm El Sheikh, Egypt; Hard; M15; Singles and Doubles Draws	Yan Bondarevskiy; Ivan Liutarevich; 6–0, 7–6^{(8–6)}	Alexandr Binda; Ilia Simakin	(Czech Republic) Vojtěch Petr (Austria) Lukas Krainer	(Cyprus) Petros Chrysochos (South Africa) Kris van Wyk; Ilia Simakin (Egypt) Amr Elsayed
November 28	Madrid, Spain; Hard; M15; Singles and Doubles Draws	(North Macedonia) Kalin Ivanovski; 6–4, 6–2	(United Kingdom) Mark Whitehouse	(Netherlands) Sidané Pontjodikromo (Spain) John Echeverría	(Mexico) Alan Fernando Rubio Fierros (France) Thomas Deschamps (Germany) Tim Handel (Spain) Benjamín Winter López
November 28	Madrid, Spain; Hard; M15; Singles and Doubles Draws	(Finland) Eero Vasa (United Kingdom) Mark Whitehouse; 7–6^{(8–6)}, 6–3	(Germany) Tim Handel (Switzerland) Yannik Steinegger	(Netherlands) Sidané Pontjodikromo (Spain) John Echeverría	(Mexico) Alan Fernando Rubio Fierros (France) Thomas Deschamps (Germany) Tim Handel (Spain) Benjamín Winter López
November 28	Monastir, Tunisia; Hard; M15; Singles and Doubles Draws	(Croatia) Dino Prižmić; 7–6^{(7–4)}, 3–6, 6–3	(France) Alexis Gautier	(France) Constantin Bittoun Kouzmine (Germany) Kai Wehnelt	(France) Nicolas Tepmahc (Germany) Adrian Oetzbach (Germany) Dominik Boehler (Czech Republic) Jiří Jeníček
November 28	Monastir, Tunisia; Hard; M15; Singles and Doubles Draws	(Germany) Kai Wehnelt (France) Cyril Vandermeersch; 1–6, 6–2, [10–6]	(Portugal) Tiago Pereira (Belgium) Olivier Rojas	(France) Constantin Bittoun Kouzmine (Germany) Kai Wehnelt	(France) Nicolas Tepmahc (Germany) Adrian Oetzbach (Germany) Dominik Boehler (Czech Republic) Jiří Jeníček
November 28	Antalya, Turkey; Clay; M15; Singles and Doubles Draws	(Romania) Filip Cristian Jianu; 6–2, 6–4	(Montenegro) Rrezart Cungu	(Austria) David Pichler (Spain) Àlex Martí Pujolràs	(Uzbekistan) Maxim Shin (Spain) Jorge Martínez Martínez (Moldova) Ilya Snițari (Romania) Cezar Crețu
November 28	Antalya, Turkey; Clay; M15; Singles and Doubles Draws	Mikhail Fufygin; Timur Kiyamov; 6–2, 2–6, [10–4]	(Turkey) S Mert Özdemir (Turkey) Sarp Ağabigün	(Austria) David Pichler (Spain) Àlex Martí Pujolràs	(Uzbekistan) Maxim Shin (Spain) Jorge Martínez Martínez (Moldova) Ilya Snițari (Romania) Cezar Crețu

=== December ===
Week of	Tournament	Winner	Runners-up	Semifinalists	Quarterfinalists
December 5	Sharm El Sheikh, Egypt; Hard; M15; Singles and Doubles Draws	(South Africa) Kris van Wyk; 4–6, 6–4, 6–2	(Egypt) Amr Elsayed	(Senegal) Seydina André (Italy) Samuel Vincent Ruggeri	(Germany) Oscar Moraing (United Kingdom) Matthew Summers (Italy) Simone Roncalli (Italy) Filippo Speziali
December 5	Sharm El Sheikh, Egypt; Hard; M15; Singles and Doubles Draws	Semen Voronin; Petr Bar Biryukov; 6–2, 6–7^{(3–7)}, [10–7]	(United Kingdom) Scott Duncan (Canada) Kelsey Stevenson	(Senegal) Seydina André (Italy) Samuel Vincent Ruggeri	(Germany) Oscar Moraing (United Kingdom) Matthew Summers (Italy) Simone Roncalli (Italy) Filippo Speziali
December 5	Trnava, Slovakia; Hard (indoor); M15; Singles and Doubles Draws	(Jordan) Abedallah Shelbayh; 6–1, 6–4	(Spain) Daniel Rincón	Aliaksandr Bulitski (Czech Republic) Jiří Barnat	(Italy) Andrea Guerrieri (United States) Roy Smith (Greece) Stefanos Sakellaridis (Czech Republic) Michael Vrbenský
December 5	Trnava, Slovakia; Hard (indoor); M15; Singles and Doubles Draws	(Spain) Daniel Rincón (Paraguay) Daniel Vallejo; 6–4, 6–2	(Jordan) Abedallah Shelbayh (Hong Kong) Coleman Wong	Aliaksandr Bulitski (Czech Republic) Jiří Barnat	(Italy) Andrea Guerrieri (United States) Roy Smith (Greece) Stefanos Sakellaridis (Czech Republic) Michael Vrbenský
December 5	Madrid, Spain; Clay; M15; Singles and Doubles Draws	(Spain) Miguel Damas; 7–6^{(7–4)}, 6–3	(Switzerland) Rémy Bertola	(United Kingdom) Jan Choinski (Spain) Àlex Martí Pujolràs	(Spain) Alejandro Manzanera Pertusa (China) Mu Tao (Ukraine) Aleksandr Braynin (Netherlands) Ryan Nijboer
December 5	Madrid, Spain; Clay; M15; Singles and Doubles Draws	(Italy) Pietro Schiavetti (Switzerland) Rémy Bertola; 3–6, 6–3, [10–3]	(Spain) Samuel Martínez Arjona (Spain) Alejandro Manzanera Pertusa	(United Kingdom) Jan Choinski (Spain) Àlex Martí Pujolràs	(Spain) Alejandro Manzanera Pertusa (China) Mu Tao (Ukraine) Aleksandr Braynin (Netherlands) Ryan Nijboer
December 5	Monastir, Tunisia; Hard; M15; Singles and Doubles Draws	(Croatia) Dino Prižmić; 6–2, 7–5	(France) Constantin Bittoun Kouzmine	(France) Arthur Bouquier (Germany) Adrian Oetzbach	(Croatia) Luka Mikrut (France) Raphaël Lambling (Italy) Leonardo Rossi (Italy) Gabriele Maria Noce
December 5	Monastir, Tunisia; Hard; M15; Singles and Doubles Draws	(France) Raphaël Lambling (France) Arthur Bouquier; 7–5, 5–7, [10–4]	(Germany) Adrian Oetzbach (Germany) Christoph Negritu	(France) Arthur Bouquier (Germany) Adrian Oetzbach	(Croatia) Luka Mikrut (France) Raphaël Lambling (Italy) Leonardo Rossi (Italy) Gabriele Maria Noce
December 5	Antalya, Turkey; Clay; M15; Singles and Doubles Draws	(Moldova) Ilya Snițari; 5–7, 6–3, 7–5	Savva Polukhin	(Italy) Fabrizio Andaloro (Netherlands) Max Houkes	Evgeny Philippov (Ukraine) Oleg Prihodko (Portugal) Daniel Rodrigues (Romania) Filip Cristian Jianu
December 5	Antalya, Turkey; Clay; M15; Singles and Doubles Draws	Mikhail Fufygin; Denis Golubev; 5–7, 7–5, [10–7]	(Austria) David Pichler (Italy) Federico Campana	(Italy) Fabrizio Andaloro (Netherlands) Max Houkes	Evgeny Philippov (Ukraine) Oleg Prihodko (Portugal) Daniel Rodrigues (Romania) Filip Cristian Jianu
December 12	Sharm El Sheikh, Egypt; Hard; M15; Singles and Doubles Draws	(Poland) Martyn Pawelski; 6–2, 6–4	(India) Mukund Sasikumar	(Senegal) Seydina André (United States) Kareem Al Allaf	(Kazakhstan) Grigoriy Lomakin (Egypt) Amr Elsayed (Italy) Lorenzo Lorusso (Croatia) Nikola Bašić
December 12	Sharm El Sheikh, Egypt; Hard; M15; Singles and Doubles Draws	(United Kingdom) Scott Duncan (Canada) Kelsey Stevenson; 6–4, 6–4	Yan Bondarevskiy; Alexandr Binda	(Senegal) Seydina André (United States) Kareem Al Allaf	(Kazakhstan) Grigoriy Lomakin (Egypt) Amr Elsayed (Italy) Lorenzo Lorusso (Croatia) Nikola Bašić
December 12	Wellington, New Zealand; Hard; M15; Singles and Doubles Draws	(New Zealand) Ajeet Rai; 6–2, 6–4	(New Zealand) James Watt	(Australia) Kody Pearson (Australia) Jeremy Beale	(Japan) Daisuke Sumizawa (New Zealand) George Stoupe (New Zealand) Isaac Becroft (New Zealand) Jack Loutit
December 12	Wellington, New Zealand; Hard; M15; Singles and Doubles Draws	(Australia) Jake Delaney (New Zealand) Finn Reynolds; 6–2, 6–7^{(4–7)}, [10–8]	(New Zealand) Isaac Becroft (Australia) Kody Pearson	(Australia) Kody Pearson (Australia) Jeremy Beale	(Japan) Daisuke Sumizawa (New Zealand) George Stoupe (New Zealand) Isaac Becroft (New Zealand) Jack Loutit
December 12	Monastir, Tunisia; Hard; M15; Singles and Doubles Draws	(Croatia) Dino Prižmić; 6–3, 7–5	(United States) Omni Kumar	(Greece) Stefanos Sakellaridis (South Africa) Kris van Wyk	(Tunisia) Wissam Abderrahman (Italy) Stefano Battaglino; Bogdan Bobrov (Germany) Christoph Negritu
December 12	Monastir, Tunisia; Hard; M15; Singles and Doubles Draws	Bogdan Bobrov (Austria) Neil Oberleitner; 7–6^{(7–4)}, 6–1	(Italy) Gabriele Maria Noce (Italy) Stefano Battaglino	(Greece) Stefanos Sakellaridis (South Africa) Kris van Wyk	(Tunisia) Wissam Abderrahman (Italy) Stefano Battaglino; Bogdan Bobrov (Germany) Christoph Negritu
December 12	Antalya, Turkey; Clay; M15; Singles and Doubles Draws	(Germany) Rudolf Molleker; 6–3, 6–4	(Bulgaria) Yanaki Milev	(Netherlands) Max Houkes; Savva Polukhin	(Japan) Kokoro Isomura (Japan) Hayato Matsuoka (Ukraine) Aleksandr Braynin (Italy) Fabrizio Andaloro
December 12	Antalya, Turkey; Clay; M15; Singles and Doubles Draws	Egor Noskin; Evgeny Philippov; 6–1, 6–4	(Japan) Geni Inoue (Japan) Hayato Matsuoka	(Netherlands) Max Houkes; Savva Polukhin	(Japan) Kokoro Isomura (Japan) Hayato Matsuoka (Ukraine) Aleksandr Braynin (Italy) Fabrizio Andaloro
December 19	Sharm El Sheikh, Egypt; Hard; M15; Singles and Doubles Draws	(Italy) Samuel Vincent Ruggeri; 7–5, 7–6^{(7–3)}	(France) Timo Legout	Alexandr Binda (Georgia (country)) Saba Purtseladze	(Italy) Gabriele Pennaforti (Poland) Martyn Pawelski (Georgia (country)) Zura Tkemaladze; Marat Sharipov
December 19	Sharm El Sheikh, Egypt; Hard; M15; Singles and Doubles Draws	Marat Sharipov (Kazakhstan) Grigoriy Lomakin; Walkover	(Canada) Kelsey Stevenson (Italy) Gabriele Pennaforti	Alexandr Binda (Georgia (country)) Saba Purtseladze	(Italy) Gabriele Pennaforti (Poland) Martyn Pawelski (Georgia (country)) Zura Tkemaladze; Marat Sharipov
December 19	Tauranga, New Zealand; Hard; M15; Singles and Doubles Draws	(New Zealand) Kiranpal Pannu; 4–6, 6–2, 6–4	(Australia) Derek Pham	(Australia) Jeremy Beale (Australia) Blake Ellis	(New Zealand) Rob Reynolds (Australia) Calum Puttergill (France) Arthur Weber (New Zealand) Rubin Statham
December 19	Tauranga, New Zealand; Hard; M15; Singles and Doubles Draws	(New Zealand) Jack Loutit (Japan) Daisuke Sumizawa; 6–4, 7–5	(New Zealand) George Stoupe (New Zealand) Reece Falck	(Australia) Jeremy Beale (Australia) Blake Ellis	(New Zealand) Rob Reynolds (Australia) Calum Puttergill (France) Arthur Weber (New Zealand) Rubin Statham
December 19	Monastir, Tunisia; Hard; M15; Singles and Doubles Draws	(United States) Omni Kumar; 6–1, 6–2	(France) Robin Bertrand	(Morocco) Elliot Benchetrit; Bogdan Bobrov	(Spain) Adrià Soriano Barrera (Mexico) Alex Hernández (Italy) Manuel Mazza (France) Florent Bax
December 19	Monastir, Tunisia; Hard; M15; Singles and Doubles Draws	(France) Louis Tessa (France) Mathieu Scaglia; 6–3, 7–6^{(7–4)}	Bogdan Bobrov (Bulgaria) Leonid Sheyngezikht	(Morocco) Elliot Benchetrit; Bogdan Bobrov	(Spain) Adrià Soriano Barrera (Mexico) Alex Hernández (Italy) Manuel Mazza (France) Florent Bax
December 26	Monastir, Tunisia; Hard; M15; Singles and Doubles Draws	Bogdan Bobrov; 6–4, 7–5	(Monaco) Lucas Catarina	(France) Robin Bertrand (United States) Samir Banerjee	(Estonia) Kristjan Tamm (France) Mathieu Scaglia (France) Arthur Géa (Japan) Ryotaro Taguchi
December 26	Monastir, Tunisia; Hard; M15; Singles and Doubles Draws	(Bulgaria) Leonid Sheyngezikht; Bogdan Bobrov; 6–2, 6–2	(France) Robin Bertrand (Algeria) Nazim Makhlouf	(France) Robin Bertrand (United States) Samir Banerjee	(Estonia) Kristjan Tamm (France) Mathieu Scaglia (France) Arthur Géa (Japan) Ryotaro Taguchi
