= 2026 Open de Vendée – Singles =

Singles
- 2026 Open de Vendée

Final
- Champion: (France) Clément Chidekh
- Runner-up: (France) Sascha Gueymard Wayenburg
- Score: 6–2, 6–0

Events
Singles	Doubles
- Open de Vendée

Nicolai Budkov Kjær was the defending champion but lost in the second round to Felix Balshaw.

Clément Chidekh won the title after defeating Sascha Gueymard Wayenburg 6–2, 6–0 in the final.

== Seeds ==
1. (Estonia) Mark Lajal (first round)
2. (Norway) Nicolai Budkov Kjær (second round)
3. (Australia) Tristan Schoolkate (second round)
4. (France) Clément Tabur (quarterfinals)
5. (Belgium) Gauthier Onclin (second round)
6. (Estonia) Daniil Glinka (first round)
7. (France) Clément Chidekh (champion)
8. (United Kingdom) Harry Wendelken (second round)

== Draw ==
Key

- Q = Qualifier
- WC = Wild card
- LL = Lucky loser
- Alt = Alternate
- ITF = ITF entry
- PR = Protected ranking
- SR = Special ranking
- SE = Special exempt
- JE = Junior exempt
- JR = Junior Accelerator Programme entrant
- CO = College Accelerator Programme entrant
- NG = Next Gen Accelerator Program entrant
- w/o = Walkover
- r = Retired
- d = Defaulted

=== Finals ===
Semifinals
(Austria) Joel Schwärzler	4	2
WC	(France) Sascha Gueymard Wayenburg	6	6
7	(France) Clément Chidekh	6	6
JR	(Switzerland) Henry Bernet	2	4

Final
WC	(France) Sascha Gueymard Wayenburg	2	0
7	(France) Clément Chidekh	6	6

=== Top half ===
First round
1	(Estonia) M Lajal	6^{4}	7	3
WC	(France) L Poullain	7^{7}	5	6
Q	(France) Alexandre Reco	4	3
(Switzerland) R Bertola	6	6
Q	(Spain) A Barroso Campos	3	5
(Austria) J Schwärzler	6	7
Q	(Italy) F Romano	3	1
8	(United Kingdom) H Wendelken	6	6
4	(France) C Tabur	7^{7}	6^{5}	6
Alt	(France) M Martineau	6^{4}	7^{7}	3
(United Kingdom) J Pinnington Jones	2	4
WC	(France) T Faurel	6	6
(France) P-H Herbert	4	5
WC	(France) S Gueymard Wayenburg	6	7
(France) D Added	6^{4}	2
5	(Belgium) G Onclin	7^{7}	6

Second round
WC	(France) L Poullain	3	7	6
(Switzerland) R Bertola	6	5	3
(Austria) J Schwärzler	6	6
8	(United Kingdom) H Wendelken	4	3
4	(France) C Tabur	6	6
WC	(France) T Faurel	1	4
WC	(France) S Gueymard Wayenburg	6	6
5	(Belgium) G Onclin	1	4

Quarterfinals
WC	(France) L Poullain	4	1
(Austria) J Schwärzler	6	6
4	(France) C Tabur	6	3	4
WC	(France) S Gueymard Wayenburg	2	6	6

Semifinals
(Austria) J Schwärzler	4	2
WC	(France) S Gueymard Wayenburg	6	6

=== Bottom half ===
First round
7	(France) C Chidekh	6	6
Alt	(Belgium) D Goffin	1	0
Q	(Norway) V Durasovic	3	4
(France) U Blanchet	6	6
(France) H Mayot	6	7
Q	(Netherlands) N Visker	3	5
(South Africa) P Henning	3	4
3	(Australia) T Schoolkate	6	6
6	(Estonia) D Glinka	4	4
JR	(Switzerland) H Bernet	6	6
(United Kingdom) L Broady	4	6	1
(Switzerland) D Stricker	6	3	6
(United Kingdom) B Harris	6^{6}	6	6^{3}
(France) F Balshaw	7^{8}	3	7^{7}
Q	(France) Yanis Ghazouani Durand	3	2
2	(Norway) N Budkov Kjær	6	6

Second round
7	(France) C Chidekh	6	3	6
(France) U Blanchet	4	6	2
(France) H Mayot	6	2	6
3	(Australia) T Schoolkate	4	6	4
JR	(Switzerland) H Bernet	6	7^{7}
(Switzerland) D Stricker	1	6^{4}
(France) F Balshaw	7	4	7^{7}
2	(Norway) N Budkov Kjær	5	6	6^{5}

Quarterfinals
7	(France) C Chidekh	3	6	2
(France) H Mayot	6	2	0^{r}
JR	(Switzerland) H Bernet	3	6	6
(France) F Balshaw	6	2	3

Semifinals
7	(France) C Chidekh	6	6
JR	(Switzerland) H Bernet	2	4
