= 2025 Tampere Open – Singles =

Singles
- 2025 Tampere Open

Final
- Champion: (Norway) Nicolai Budkov Kjær
- Runner-up: (France) Sascha Gueymard Wayenburg
- Score: 7–6^{(7–5)}, 6–7^{(2–7)}, 6–2

Events
Singles	Doubles
- Tampere Open

Daniel Rincón was the defending champion but lost in the second round to Hynek Bartoň.

Nicolai Budkov Kjær won the title after defeating Sascha Gueymard Wayenburg 7–6^{(7–5)}, 6–7^{(2–7)}, 6–2 in the final.

== Seeds ==
1. (United Kingdom) Jay Clarke (first round)
2. (Belgium) Gauthier Onclin (second round)
3. (Spain) Daniel Rincón (second round)
4. (Kazakhstan) Dmitry Popko (first round)
5. (Norway) Viktor Durasovic (second round)
6. (Belgium) Kimmer Coppejans (first round)
7. (Italy) Federico Cinà (quarterfinals)
8. (Portugal) Frederico Ferreira Silva (second round)

== Draw ==
Key

- Q = Qualifier
- WC = Wild card
- LL = Lucky loser
- Alt = Alternate
- ITF = ITF entry
- PR = Protected ranking
- SR = Special ranking
- SE = Special exempt
- JE = Junior exempt
- JR = Junior Accelerator Programme entrant
- CO = College Accelerator Programme entrant
- NG = Next Gen Accelerator Program entrant
- w/o = Walkover
- r = Retired
- d = Defaulted

=== Finals ===
Semifinals
Alt	(India) Sumit Nagal	5	2
(France) Sascha Gueymard Wayenburg	7	6
Q	(Czech Republic) Hynek Bartoň	4	6^{4}
JR	(Norway) Nicolai Budkov Kjær	6	7^{7}

Final
(France) Sascha Gueymard Wayenburg	6^{5}	7^{7}	2
JR	(Norway) Nicolai Budkov Kjær	7^{7}	6^{2}	6

=== Top half ===
First round
1	(United Kingdom) J Clarke	6^{4}	1
Alt	(India) S Nagal	7^{7}	6
WC	(Finland) Vesa Ahti	2	5
(Netherlands) M Houkes	6	7
Q	(Argentina) N Kicker	6	3	6
(Belgium) M Geerts	2	6	1
(Germany) P Zahraj	3	7^{7}	5
5	(Norway) V Durasovic	6	6^{4}	7
4	(Kazakhstan) D Popko	3	2
NG	(Belgium) G-A Bailly	6	6
(Kazakhstan) T Skatov	6^{2}	0^{r}
Q	(France) T Faurel	7^{7}	4
Q	(Brazil) JL Reis da Silva	6	6
(Peru) G Bueno	2	2
(France) S Gueymard Wayenburg	6	3	6
6	(Belgium) K Coppejans	3	6	4

Second round
Alt	(India) S Nagal	6	6
(Netherlands) M Houkes	2	4
Q	(Argentina) N Kicker	3	6	6
5	(Norway) V Durasovic	6	3	4
NG	(Belgium) G-A Bailly	6	6
Q	(France) T Faurel	4	4
Q	(Brazil) JL Reis da Silva	4	3
(France) S Gueymard Wayenburg	6	6

Quarterfinals
Alt	(India) S Nagal	6	6
Q	(Argentina) N Kicker	4	3
NG	(Belgium) G-A Bailly	3	4
(France) S Gueymard Wayenburg	6	6

Semifinals
Alt	(India) S Nagal	5	2
(France) S Gueymard Wayenburg	7	6

=== Bottom half ===
First round
7	(Italy) F Cinà	6	6
(Brazil) M Pucinelli de Almeida	3	2
Q	(Slovakia) A Molčan	4	6	2
I Gakhov	6	4	6
Alt	(Poland) D Michalski	1	3
Q	(Czech Republic) H Bartoň	6	6
(Germany) C Negritu	2	4
3	(Spain) D Rincón	6	6
8	(Portugal) F Ferreira Silva	7^{7}	6
WC	(Finland) E Vasa	6^{4}	3
JR	(Norway) N Budkov Kjær	6	6
(Argentina) A Barrena	3	2
(France) Mathys Erhard	6	6
WC	(Finland) O Paldanius	3	1
Q	(Greece) A Thanos	4	3
2	(Belgium) G Onclin	6	6

Second round
7	(Italy) F Cinà	6	6
I Gakhov	3	4
Q	(Czech Republic) H Bartoň	4	6	6
3	(Spain) D Rincón	6	2	1
8	(Portugal) F Ferreira Silva	5	4
JR	(Norway) N Budkov Kjær	7	6
(France) M Erhard	6	7
2	(Belgium) G Onclin	2	5

Quarterfinals
7	(Italy) F Cinà	2	6	2
Q	(Czech Republic) H Bartoň	6	3	6
JR	(Norway) N Budkov Kjær	6	4
(France) M Erhard	0	0^{r}

Semifinals
Q	(Czech Republic) H Bartoň	4	6^{4}
JR	(Norway) N Budkov Kjær	6	7^{7}
