= 2025 Open Quimper Bretagne – Doubles =

Doubles
- 2025 Open Quimper Bretagne

Final
- Champions: (France) Sadio Doumbia (France) Fabien Reboul
- Runners-up: (Monaco) Romain Arneodo (France) Manuel Guinard
- Score: 6–2, 4–6, [10–3]

Events
Singles	Doubles
- Open Quimper Bretagne

Manuel Guinard and Arthur Rinderknech were the defending champions but only Guinard chose to defend his title, partnering Romain Arneodo. They lost in the final to Sadio Doumbia and Fabien Reboul.

Doumbia and Reboul won the title after defeating Arneodo and Guinard 6–2, 4–6, [10–3] in the final.

== Seeds ==
1. (France) Sadio Doumbia / (France) Fabien Reboul (champions)
2. (Brazil) Rafael Matos / (Brazil) Marcelo Zormann (quarterfinals)
3. (Monaco) Romain Arneodo / (France) Manuel Guinard (final)
4. (United States) Christian Harrison / (United States) Evan King (first round)

== Draw ==
Key

- Q = Qualifier
- WC = Wild card
- LL = Lucky loser
- Alt = Alternate
- ITF = ITF entry
- PR = Protected ranking
- SR = Special ranking
- SE = Special exempt
- JE = Junior exempt
- JR = Junior Accelerator Programme entrant
- CO = College Accelerator Programme entrant
- NG = Next Gen Accelerator Program entrant
- w/o = Walkover
- r = Retired
- d = Defaulted

=== Draw ===
First round
1	(France) S Doumbia (France) F Reboul	6	6
(France) T Atmane (France) T Droguet	2	1
WC	(France) U Blanchet (France) M Martineau	6	6^{4}	[10]
Alt	(France) G Blancaneaux (Denmark) A Holmgren	0	7^{7}	[6]
4	(United States) C Harrison (United States) E King	4	4
(France) T Arribagé (Romania) V Cornea	6	6
(United States) M McDonald (Spain) D Vega Hernández	6	1
(Austria) D Pichler (Ukraine) V Sachko	4	0^{r}
(United States) M Kiger (New Zealand) F Reynolds	7^{7}	4	[8]
3	(Monaco) R Arneodo (France) M Guinard	6^{3}	6	[10]
(United States) R Cash (United States) JJ Tracy	6	6
(Romania) A Jecan (Italy) G Ricca	2	4
(France) H Mayot (France) L Sanchez	6	0	[7]
2	(Brazil) R Matos (Brazil) M Zormann	2	6	[10]

Quarterfinals
1	(France) S Doumbia (France) F Reboul	7	7^{7}
WC	(France) U Blanchet (France) M Martineau	5	6^{4}
(France) T Arribagé (Romania) V Cornea	6	7^{7}
(United States) M McDonald (Spain) D Vega Hernández	2	6^{3}
WC	(France) C Denolly (France) K Jacquet	1	1
3	(Monaco) R Arneodo (France) M Guinard	6	6
(United States) R Cash (United States) JJ Tracy	6	3	[10]
2	(Brazil) R Matos (Brazil) M Zormann	2	6	[7]

Semifinals
1	(France) S Doumbia (France) F Reboul	6	6
(France) T Arribagé (Romania) V Cornea	2	3
3	(Monaco) R Arneodo (France) M Guinard	7	6
(United States) R Cash (United States) JJ Tracy	5	1

Final
1	(France) S Doumbia (France) F Reboul	6	4	[10]
3	(Monaco) R Arneodo (France) M Guinard	2	6	[3]
