= 2025 Tampere Open =

- Date: 21–27 July
- Edition: 43rd
- Surface: Clay
- Location: Tampere, Finland

Champions

Singles
- (Norway) Nicolai Budkov Kjær

Doubles
- (Germany) Christoph Negritu / (Ukraine) Vladyslav Orlov
- Tampere Open

The 2025 Tampere Open was a professional tennis tournament played on clay courts. It was the 43rd edition of the tournament which was part of the 2025 ATP Challenger Tour. It took place in Tampere, Finland, between 21 and 27 July 2025.

== Singles main draw entrants ==
=== Seeds ===
Country	Player	Rank^{1}	Seed
GBR	Jay Clarke	199	1
BEL	Gauthier Onclin	200	2
ESP	Daniel Rincón	202	3
KAZ	Dmitry Popko	214	4
NOR	Viktor Durasovic	230	5
BEL	Kimmer Coppejans	237	6
ITA	Federico Cinà	243	7
POR	Frederico Ferreira Silva	250	8

- ^{1} Rankings as of 14 July 2025.

=== Other entrants ===
The following players received wildcards into the singles main draw:

- (Finland) Vesa Ahti
- (Finland) Oskari Paldanius
- (Finland) Eero Vasa

The following player received entry into the singles main draw through the Junior Accelerator programme:

- (Norway) Nicolai Budkov Kjær

The following player received entry into the singles main draw through the Next Gen Accelerator programme:

- (Belgium) Gilles-Arnaud Bailly

The following players received entry into the singles main draw as alternates:

- (Poland) Daniel Michalski
- (India) Sumit Nagal

The following players received entry from the qualifying draw:

- (Czech Republic) Hynek Bartoň
- (France) Thomas Faurel
- (Argentina) Nicolás Kicker
- (Slovakia) Alex Molčan
- (Brazil) João Lucas Reis da Silva
- (Greece) Aristotelis Thanos

== Champions ==
=== Singles ===
- (Norway) Nicolai Budkov Kjær def. (France) Sascha Gueymard Wayenburg 7–6^{(7–5)}, 6–7^{(2–7)}, 6–2.

=== Doubles ===
- (Germany) Christoph Negritu / (Ukraine) Vladyslav Orlov def. (Netherlands) Mats Hermans / (Netherlands) Mick Veldheer 7–5, 6–1.
