= 2025 Tampere Open – Doubles =

Doubles
- 2025 Tampere Open

Final
- Champions: (Germany) Christoph Negritu (Ukraine) Vladyslav Orlov
- Runners-up: (Netherlands) Mats Hermans (Netherlands) Mick Veldheer
- Score: 7–5, 6–1

Events
Singles	Doubles
- Tampere Open

Íñigo Cervantes and Daniel Rincón were the defending champions but chose not to defend their title.

Christoph Negritu and Vladyslav Orlov won the title after defeating Mats Hermans and Mick Veldheer 7–5, 6–1 in the final.

== Seeds ==
1. (Netherlands) Mats Hermans / (Netherlands) Mick Veldheer (final)
2. (Serbia) Ivan Sabanov / (Serbia) Matej Sabanov (first round)
3. (Romania) Alexandru Jecan / (Romania) Bogdan Pavel (semifinals)
4. (Czech Republic) Hynek Bartoň / (Slovakia) Miloš Karol (semifinals)

== Draw ==
Key

- Q = Qualifier
- WC = Wild card
- LL = Lucky loser
- Alt = Alternate
- ITF = ITF entry
- PR = Protected ranking
- SR = Special ranking
- SE = Special exempt
- JE = Junior exempt
- JR = Junior Accelerator Programme entrant
- CO = College Accelerator Programme entrant
- NG = Next Gen Accelerator Program entrant
- w/o = Walkover
- r = Retired
- d = Defaulted

=== Draw ===
First round
1	(Netherlands) M Hermans (Netherlands) M Veldheer	6	6
(Peru) G Bueno (Peru) A Huertas del Pino	3	3
WC	(Finland) Vesa Ahti (Finland) Hermanni Tiainen	6	6
(Kazakhstan) D Popko (Kazakhstan) T Skatov	4	3
3	(Romania) A Jecan (Romania) B Pavel	7^{7}	6
WC	(Finland) O Paldanius (Poland) A Ważny	6^{4}	4
(Sweden) E Grevelius (Sweden) A Heinonen	6^{15}	2
(Zimbabwe) CJ Lock (Netherlands) T Loof	7^{17}	6
(United Kingdom) J Clarke (Japan) S Watanabe	6	5	[10]
(Germany) T Rühl (Germany) P Zahraj	4	7	[5]
(Norway) V Durasovic (Finland) P Niklas-Salminen	4	6^{5}
4	(Czech Republic) H Bartoň (Slovakia) M Karol	6	7^{7}
(Finland) Patrick Kaukovalta (Finland) E Vasa	1	1
(Germany) C Negritu (Ukraine) V Orlov	6	6
(Belgium) M Geerts (Poland) S Walków	6	6
2	(Serbia) I Sabanov (Serbia) M Sabanov	3	3

Quarterfinals
1	(Netherlands) M Hermans (Netherlands) M Veldheer	6	7^{7}
WC	(Finland) V Ahti (Finland) H Tiainen	1	6^{2}
3	(Romania) A Jecan (Romania) B Pavel	7^{7}	7^{10}
(Zimbabwe) CJ Lock (Netherlands) T Loof	6^{3}	6^{8}
(United Kingdom) J Clarke (Japan) S Watanabe	5	2
4	(Czech Republic) H Bartoň (Slovakia) M Karol	7	6
(Germany) C Negritu (Ukraine) V Orlov	6	6
(Belgium) M Geerts (Poland) S Walków	3	2

Semifinals
1	(Netherlands) M Hermans (Netherlands) M Veldheer	6	6
3	(Romania) A Jecan (Romania) B Pavel	3	2
4	(Czech Republic) H Bartoň (Slovakia) M Karol	1	6^{3}
(Germany) C Negritu (Ukraine) V Orlov	6	7^{7}

Final
1	(Netherlands) M Hermans (Netherlands) M Veldheer	5	1
(Germany) C Negritu (Ukraine) V Orlov	7	6
