= 2026 Open de Vendée =

- Date: 28 September – 4 October
- Edition: 13th
- Surface: Hard (Indoor)
- Location: Mouilleron-le-Captif, France

Champions

Singles
- (France) Clément Chidekh

Doubles
- (United States) Karl Poling / (United States) Joshua Sheehy
- Open de Vendée

The 2026 Open de Vendée was a professional tennis tournament played on hard courts. It was the 13th edition of the tournament which was part of the 2026 ATP Challenger Tour. It took place in Mouilleron-le-Captif, France between 28 September and 4 October 2026.

== Singles main-draw entrants ==
=== Seeds ===
Country	Player	Rank^{1}	Seed
EST	Mark Lajal	143	1
NOR	Nicolai Budkov Kjær	146	2
AUS	Tristan Schoolkate	152	3
FRA	Clément Tabur	160	4
BEL	Gauthier Onclin	172	5
EST	Daniil Glinka	173	6
FRA	Clément Chidekh	177	7
GBR	Harry Wendelken	178	8

- ^{1} Rankings are as of 21 September 2026.

=== Other entrants ===
The following players received wildcards into the singles main draw:

- (France) Thomas Faurel
- (France) Sascha Gueymard Wayenburg
- (France) Lucas Poullain

The following player received entry into the singles main draw through the Junior Accelerator programme:

- (Switzerland) Henry Bernet

The following players received entry into the singles main draw as alternates:

- (Belgium) David Goffin
- (France) Matteo Martineau

The following players received entry from the qualifying draw:

- (Spain) Alberto Barroso Campos
- (Norway) Viktor Durasovic
- (France) Yanis Ghazouani Durand
- (France) Alexandre Reco
- (Italy) Filippo Romano
- (Netherlands) Niels Visker

== Champions ==
=== Singles ===
- (France) Clément Chidekh def. (France) Sascha Gueymard Wayenburg 6–2, 6–0.

=== Doubles ===
- (United States) Karl Poling / (United States) Joshua Sheehy def. (United Kingdom) Finn Bass / (United Kingdom) Scott Duncan 7–6^{(7–4)}, 4–6, [10–3].
