= Erik Arutiunian =

Belarusian tennis player (born 2004)

- Full name: Erik Pajłakovič Arutiunian
- Native name: Эрык Пайлакавіч Аруцюнян
- Country (sports): Belarus
- Born: 19 October 2004 (age 21) Minsk, Belarus
- Height: 1.91 m (6 ft 3 in)
- Plays: Right-handed (two-handed backhand)
- College: LSU
- Prize money: US $60,781

Singles
- Career record: 157–116
- Career titles: 0 ATP, 2 ITF
- Highest ranking: No. 430 (12 January 2026)
- Current ranking: No. 591 (12 October 2026)

Doubles
- Career record: 109–71
- Career titles: 0 ATP, 9 ITF
- Highest ranking: No. 415 (14 July 2025)
- Current ranking: No. 1,963 (12 October 2026)
- Last updated on: 18 October 2026.

Erik Arutiunian (born 19 October 2004) is a Belarusian tennis player of Armenian origin. He has a career high ATP singles ranking of No. 430 achieved on 12 January 2026 and a doubles ranking of No. 415 achieved on 14 July 2025. Arutiunian reached an ITF junior combined ranking of No. 27 on 3 January 2022. He is currently the No. 3 singles player from Belarus.

== Career ==
Arutiunian represents Belarus at the Davis Cup, where he has a win/loss record of 0–2, which includes a straight sets loss to Guido Pella in 2021.

In February 2025, Arutiunian won the ITF Men's Tour final in Sharm El Sheikh, in which he defeated Saba Purtseladze. In 2025, Arutiunian became the No. 1 singles player from Belarus.

Arutiunian started playing college tennis at the Louisiana State University in the 2025/2026 season.

== ITF World Tennis Tour finals ==
=== Singles: 8 (2 titles, 6 runner-ups) ===
Finals by surface
Hard (2–5)
Clay (0–1)
Grass (0–0)

Result	W–L	Date	Tournament	Tier	Surface	Opponent	Score
Loss	0–1	Jun 2023	M15 Tehran, Iran	WTT	Clay	Denis Klok	2–6, 1–6
Loss	0–2	May 2024	M15 Tbilisi, Georgia	WTT	Hard	Ilia Simakin	3–6, 3–6
Win	1–2	Aug 2024	M15 Tashkent, Uzbekistan	WTT	Hard	(Czech Republic) Dominik Palán	7–6^{(7–1)}, 6–4
Win	2–2	Feb 2025	M15 Sharm El Sheikh, Egypt	WTT	Hard	(Georgia (country)) Saba Purtseladze	6–0 ret.
Loss	2–3	Mar 2025	M15 Sharm El Sheikh, Egypt	WTT	Hard	(Georgia (country)) Saba Purtseladze	4–6, 3–6
Loss	2–4	Apr 2025	M25 Sharm El Sheikh, Egypt	WTT	Hard	(Georgia (country)) Saba Purtseladze	6–2, 7–5
Loss	2–5	Nov 2025	M25 East Lansing, Michigan	WTT	Hard	(United Kingdom) Aidan McHugh	5–7, 3–6
Loss	2–6	Nov 2025	M25 Sharm El Sheikh, Egypt	WTT	Hard	(Serbia) Ognjen Milić	7–6^{(7–3)}, 6–7^{(5–7)}, 6–2

=== Doubles: 19 (8 titles, 11 runner-ups) ===
Finals by surface
Hard (8–8)
Clay (0–3)
Grass (0–0)

Result	W–L	Date	Tournament	Tier	Surface	Partner	Opponents	Score
Loss	0–1	Apr 2022	M15 Shymkent, Kazakhstan	WTT	Clay	(Georgia (country)) Saba Purtseladze	(Uzbekistan) Sergey Fomin (Ukraine) Eric Vanshelboim	3–6, 4–6
Loss	0–2	Aug 2022	M25 Tbilisi, Georgia	World Tennis Tour	Hard	Daniil Ostapenkov	Ivan Liutarevich (Kazakhstan) Grigoriy Lomakin	6–3, 6–7^{(4–7)}, [5–10]
Loss	0–3	Oct 2022	M15 Sharm El Sheikh, Egypt	World Tennis Tour	Hard	Alexander Zgirovsky	Alexander Binda; Ilia Simakin	3–6, 3–6
Win	1–3	Nov 2022	M15 Sharm El Sheikh, Egypt	World Tennis Tour	Hard	Daniil Ostapenkov	(Austria) Lukas Kreiner (Germany) Robert Strombachs	6–3, 6–4
Win	2–3	Feb 2023	M15 Sharm El Sheikh, Egypt	World Tennis Tour	Hard	Daniil Ostapenkov	(Austria) Neil Oberleitner (Ukraine) Oleksandr Ovcharenko	6–1, 6–7^{(3–7)}, [10–6]
Loss	2–4	Jun 2023	M15 Tehran, Egypt	World Tennis Tour	Clay	Daniel Ibragimov	Egor Agafonov (Kazakhstan) Grigoriy Lomakin	3–6, 6–7^{(1–7)}
Loss	2–5	Jul 2023	M15 Shanghai, China	World Tennis Tour	Hard	Daniil Ostapenkov	(Switzerland) Luca Castelnuovo (China) Wang Aoran	1–6, 5–7
Loss	2–6	Jul 2023	M15 Novi Sad, Serbia	World Tennis Tour	Clay	Daniil Ostapenkov	(Argentina) Leonardo Aboian (Argentina) Valerio Aboian	3–6, 2–6
Win	3–6	Oct 2023	M25 Sharm El Sheikh, Egypt	World Tennis Tour	Hard	(South Africa) Kris van Wyk	Petr Bar Biryukov; Ilia Simakin	6–4, 6–7^{(1–7)}, [10–7]
Win	4–6	Jan 2024	M15 Sharm El Sheikh, Egypt	World Tennis Tour	Hard	Pavel Verbin	(Italy) Federico Bondioli (Italy) Carlo Alberto Caniato	3–6, 7–5, [10–5]
Loss	4–7	Jul 2024	M25 Tianjin, China	World Tennis Tour	Hard	Aliaksandr Liaonenka	(Chinese Taipei) Huang Tsung-hao (New Zealand) Alexander Klintcharov	3–6, 6–7^{(8–10)}
Loss	4–8	Sep 2024	M15 Monastir, Tunisia	World Tennis Tour	Hard	Alexander Zgirovsky	(France) Étienne Donnet (United Kingdom) Ewen Lumsden	5–7, 6–7^{(3–7)}
Win	5–8	Dec 2024	M15 Sharm El Sheikh, Egypt	World Tennis Tour	Hard	Daniil Ostapenkov	(Italy) Alexander Binda; Evgeny Philippov	6–1, 6–2
Loss	4–9	Jan 2025	M15 Sharm El Sheikh, Egypt	World Tennis Tour	Hard	Daniil Ostapenkov	Aliaksandr Liaonenka; Alexander Zgirovsky	5–7, 3–6
Win	5–9	Jan 2025	M15 Sharm El Sheikh, Egypt	World Tennis Tour	Hard	Daniil Ostapenkov	(France) Pierre Delage (France) Louis Dussin	6–2, 4–6, [10–6]
Loss	5–10	Feb 2025	M15 Sharm El Sheikh, Egypt	World Tennis Tour	Hard	Daniil Ostapenkov	(Italy) Federico Bondioli (Italy) Carlo Alberto Caniato	6–4, 6–7^{(1–7)}, [4–10]
Win	6–10	Mar 2025	M15 Sharm El Sheikh, Egypt	World Tennis Tour	Hard	(Georgia (country)) Saba Purtseladze	(Ukraine) Aleksandr Braynin (Ukraine) Georgii Kravchenko	6–3, 7–6^{(7–5)}
Win	7–10	Mar 2025	M15 Sharm El Sheikh, Egypt	World Tennis Tour	Hard	(Georgia (country)) Saba Purtseladze	Kirill Kivattsev (Italy) Filippo Moroni	7–6^{(7–5)}, 4–6, [10–7]
Loss	7–11	Apr 2025	M25 Sharm El Sheikh, Egypt	World Tennis Tour	Hard	Daniil Ostapenkov	(United Kingdom) Ben Jones (Estonia) Kristjan Tamm	4–6, 3–6
Win	8–11	Oct 2026	M15 Lexington, Kentucky	World Tennis Tour	Hard	(Poland) Olaf Pieczkowski	(Denmark) Oskar Brostrøm Poulsen (Sweden) Nikola Slavic	6–4, 3–6, [10–7]
