= 2026 Open de Vendée – Doubles =

Doubles
- 2026 Open de Vendée

Final
- Champions: (United States) Karl Poling (United States) Joshua Sheehy
- Runners-up: (United Kingdom) Finn Bass (United Kingdom) Scott Duncan
- Score: 7–6^{(7–4)}, 4–6, [10–3]

Events
Singles	Doubles
- Open de Vendée

Grégoire Jacq and Albano Olivetti were the defending champions but chose not to defend their title.

Karl Poling and Joshua Sheehy won the title after defeating Finn Bass and Scott Duncan 7–6^{(7–4)}, 4–6, [10–3] in the final.

== Seeds ==
1. (Austria) Maximilian Neuchrist / (Czech Republic) David Poljak (quarterfinals)
2. (Netherlands) Jarno Jans / (Belgium) Joran Vliegen (quarterfinals)
3. (United States) Karl Poling / (United States) Joshua Sheehy (champions)
4. (France) Constantin Bittoun Kouzmine / (Netherlands) Niels Visker (semifinals)

== Draw ==
Key

- Q = Qualifier
- WC = Wild card
- LL = Lucky loser
- Alt = Alternate
- ITF = ITF entry
- PR = Protected ranking
- SR = Special ranking
- SE = Special exempt
- JE = Junior exempt
- JR = Junior Accelerator Programme entrant
- CO = College Accelerator Programme entrant
- NG = Next Gen Accelerator Program entrant
- w/o = Walkover
- r = Retired
- d = Defaulted

First round
1	(Austria) M Neuchrist (Czech Republic) D Poljak	6	6
(France) C Chidekh (Antigua and Barbuda) J Maginley	2	4
(United Kingdom) F Bass (United Kingdom) S Duncan	w/o
(Switzerland) R Bertola (Italy) F Romano
4	(France) C Bittoun Kouzmine (Netherlands) N Visker	5	6	[10]
(France) D Added (France) T Paris	7	2	[7]
(France) F Balshaw (France) M Martineau	6	6
(United Kingdom) B Harris (United Kingdom) M Whitehouse	4	0
(United Kingdom) T Hands (United Kingdom) M Summers	7^{7}	6
WC	(France) Gabriel Gomez (France) M Janvier	6^{3}	3
(Belgium) D Goffin (France) P-H Herbert	0	4
3	(United States) K Poling (United States) J Sheehy	6	6
WC	(France) L Poullain (France) Alexandre Reco	3	6	[6]
(United Kingdom) L Broady (United Kingdom) Emile Hudd	6	3	[10]
(Spain) A Barroso Campos (Spain) D Vega Hernández	6	5	[6]
2	(Netherlands) J Jans (Belgium) J Vliegen	2	7	[10]

Quarterfinals
1	(Austria) M Neuchrist (Czech Republic) D Poljak	6^{5}	3
(United Kingdom) F Bass (United Kingdom) S Duncan	7^{7}	6
4	(France) C Bittoun Kouzmine (Netherlands) N Visker	6	5	[10]
(France) F Balshaw (France) M Martineau	2	7	[6]
(United Kingdom) T Hands (United Kingdom) M Summers	7^{7}	3	[7]
3	(United States) K Poling (United States) J Sheehy	6^{3}	6	[10]
(United Kingdom) L Broady (United Kingdom) E Hudd	1	7^{7}	[10]
2	(Netherlands) J Jans (Belgium) J Vliegen	6	6^{5}	[6]

Semifinals
(United Kingdom) F Bass (United Kingdom) S Duncan	7^{7}	7
4	(France) C Bittoun Kouzmine (Netherlands) N Visker	6^{4}	5
3	(United States) K Poling (United States) J Sheehy	6	6
(United Kingdom) L Broady (United Kingdom) E Hudd	3	3

Final
(United Kingdom) F Bass (United Kingdom) S Duncan	6^{4}	6	[3]
3	(United States) K Poling (United States) J Sheehy	7^{7}	4	[10]
