= 2025 Open Quimper Bretagne – Singles =

Singles
- 2025 Open Quimper Bretagne

Final
- Champion: (France) Sascha Gueymard Wayenburg
- Runner-up: (France) Pierre-Hugues Herbert
- Score: 6–7^{(3–7)}, 6–1, 6–2

Events
Singles	Doubles
← 2024 ·	Open Quimper Bretagne	· 2026 →

Pierre-Hugues Herbert was the defending champion but lost in the final to Sascha Gueymard Wayenburg.

Gueymard Wayenburg won the title after defeating Herbert 6–7^{(3–7)}, 6–1, 6–2 in the final.

== Seeds ==
1. (France) Adrian Mannarino (first round)
2. (Brazil) Thiago Seyboth Wild (first round)
3. (Croatia) Borna Ćorić (first round)
4. (Finland) Otto Virtanen (first round)
5. (Italy) Mattia Bellucci (first round)
6. (United States) Aleksandar Kovacevic (second round)
7. (Kazakhstan) Mikhail Kukushkin (second round)
8. (Serbia) Laslo Djere (quarterfinals)

== Draw ==
=== Key ===
- Q = Qualifier
- WC = Wild card
- LL = Lucky loser
- Alt = Alternate
- SE = Special exempt
- PR = Protected ranking
- ITF = ITF entry
- JE = Junior exempt
- w/o = Walkover
- r = Retired
- d = Defaulted
- SR = Special ranking

=== Finals ===
Semifinals
Q	(France) Sascha Gueymard Wayenburg	7^{7}	3	6
Alt	(France) Matteo Martineau	6^{5}	6	3
Q	(Lithuania) Ričardas Berankis	3	6	3
(France) Pierre-Hugues Herbert	6	3	6

Final
Q	(France) Sascha Gueymard Wayenburg	6^{3}	6	6
(France) Pierre-Hugues Herbert	7^{7}	1	2

=== Top half ===
First round
1/WC	(France) A Mannarino	6	4	4
(United States) M McDonald	3	6	6
Q	(Switzerland) M Brunold	6	3	3
Q	(France) S Gueymard Wayenburg	0	6	6
(Netherlands) G Brouwer	5	4
Q	(France) K Jacquet	7	6
WC	(France) A Géa	4	2
8	(Serbia) L Djere	6	6
4	(Finland) O Virtanen	1	6	3
Q	(Ukraine) V Sachko	6	3	6
WC	(France) B Paire	6	1	7^{7}
(France) H Mayot	2	6	6^{4}
Alt	(France) M Martineau	6	7^{8}
(Switzerland) J Kym	3	6^{6}
A Kachmazov	5	2
6	(United States) A Kovacevic	7	6

Second round
(United States) M McDonald	3	6^{2}
Q	(France) S Gueymard Wayenburg	6	7^{7}
Q	(France) K Jacquet	7^{7}	4	4
8	(Serbia) L Djere	6^{2}	6	6
Q	(Ukraine) V Sachko	6	6^{6}	6
WC	(France) B Paire	3	7^{8}	3
Alt	(France) M Martineau	7^{7}	7^{7}
6	(United States) A Kovacevic	6^{2}	6^{3}

Quarterfinals
Q	(France) S Gueymard Wayenburg	7^{8}	6^{3}	7
8	(Serbia) L Djere	6^{6}	7^{7}	5
Q	(Ukraine) V Sachko	5	4
Alt	(France) M Martineau	7	6

Semifinals
Q	(France) S Gueymard Wayenburg	7^{7}	3	6
Alt	(France) M Martineau	6^{5}	6	3

=== Bottom half ===
First round
5	(Italy) M Bellucci	6^{5}	5
(France) C Lestienne	7^{7}	7
(Denmark) E Møller	6	7
Q	(United States) S Kozlov	3	5
(France) T Atmane	6^{2}	6	2
(France) G Barrère	7^{7}	4	6
Q	(Lithuania) R Berankis	7^{8}	6
3	(Croatia) B Ćorić	6^{6}	3
7	(Kazakhstan) M Kukushkin	6^{3}	6	6
(Slovakia) J Kovalík	7^{7}	3	4
(France) T Droguet	6	7
(Denmark) A Holmgren	4	5
(France) P-H Herbert	6	6
(France) C Hemery	3	4
Alt	(France) U Blanchet	6	7^{9}
2	(Brazil) T Seyboth Wild	4	6^{7}

Second round
(France) C Lestienne	4	4
(Denmark) E Møller	6	6
(France) G Barrère	2	2
Q	(Lithuania) R Berankis	6	6
7	(Kazakhstan) M Kukushkin	3	3
(France) T Droguet	6	6
(France) P-H Herbert	7	3	6
Alt	(France) U Blanchet	5	6	3

Quarterfinals
(Denmark) E Møller	5	4
Q	(Lithuania) R Berankis	7	6
(France) T Droguet	6^{2}	2
(France) P-H Herbert	7^{7}	6

Semifinals
Q	(Lithuania) R Berankis	3	6	3
(France) P-H Herbert	6	3	6
