= 2025 Open Quimper Bretagne =

- Date: 21–26 January
- Edition: 16th
- Surface: Hard (indoor)
- Location: Quimper, France

Champions

Singles
- (France) Sascha Gueymard Wayenburg

Doubles
- (France) Sadio Doumbia / (France) Fabien Reboul
← 2024 ·	Open Quimper Bretagne	· 2026 →

The 2025 Open Quimper Bretagne Occidentale was a professional tennis tournament played on hard courts. It was the 16th edition of the tournament which was part of the 2025 ATP Challenger Tour. It took place in Quimper, France between 21 and 26 January 2025.

== Singles main-draw entrants ==
=== Seeds ===
Country	Player	Rank^{1}	Seed
FRA	Adrian Mannarino	75	1
BRA	Thiago Seyboth Wild	79	2
CRO	Borna Ćorić	87	3
FIN	Otto Virtanen	93	4
ITA	Mattia Bellucci	100	5
USA	Aleksandar Kovacevic	109	6
KAZ	Mikhail Kukushkin	110	7
SRB	Laslo Djere	114	8

- ^{1} Rankings are as of 13 January 2025.

=== Other entrants ===
The following players received wildcards into the singles main draw:

- (France) Arthur Géa
- (France) Adrian Mannarino
- (France) Benoît Paire

The following players received entry into the singles main draw as alternates:

- (France) Ugo Blanchet
- (France) Matteo Martineau

The following players received entry from the qualifying draw:

- (Lithuania) Ričardas Berankis
- (Switzerland) Mika Brunold
- (France) Sascha Gueymard Wayenburg
- (France) Kyrian Jacquet
- (United States) Stefan Kozlov
- (Ukraine) Vitaliy Sachko

== Champions ==
=== Singles ===
- (France) Sascha Gueymard Wayenburg def. (France) Pierre-Hugues Herbert 6–7^{(3–7)}, 6–1, 6–2.

=== Doubles ===
- (France) Sadio Doumbia / (France) Fabien Reboul def. (Monaco) Romain Arneodo / (France) Manuel Guinard 6–2, 4–6, [10–3].
