= Sascha Gueymard Wayenburg =

French tennis player (born 2003)

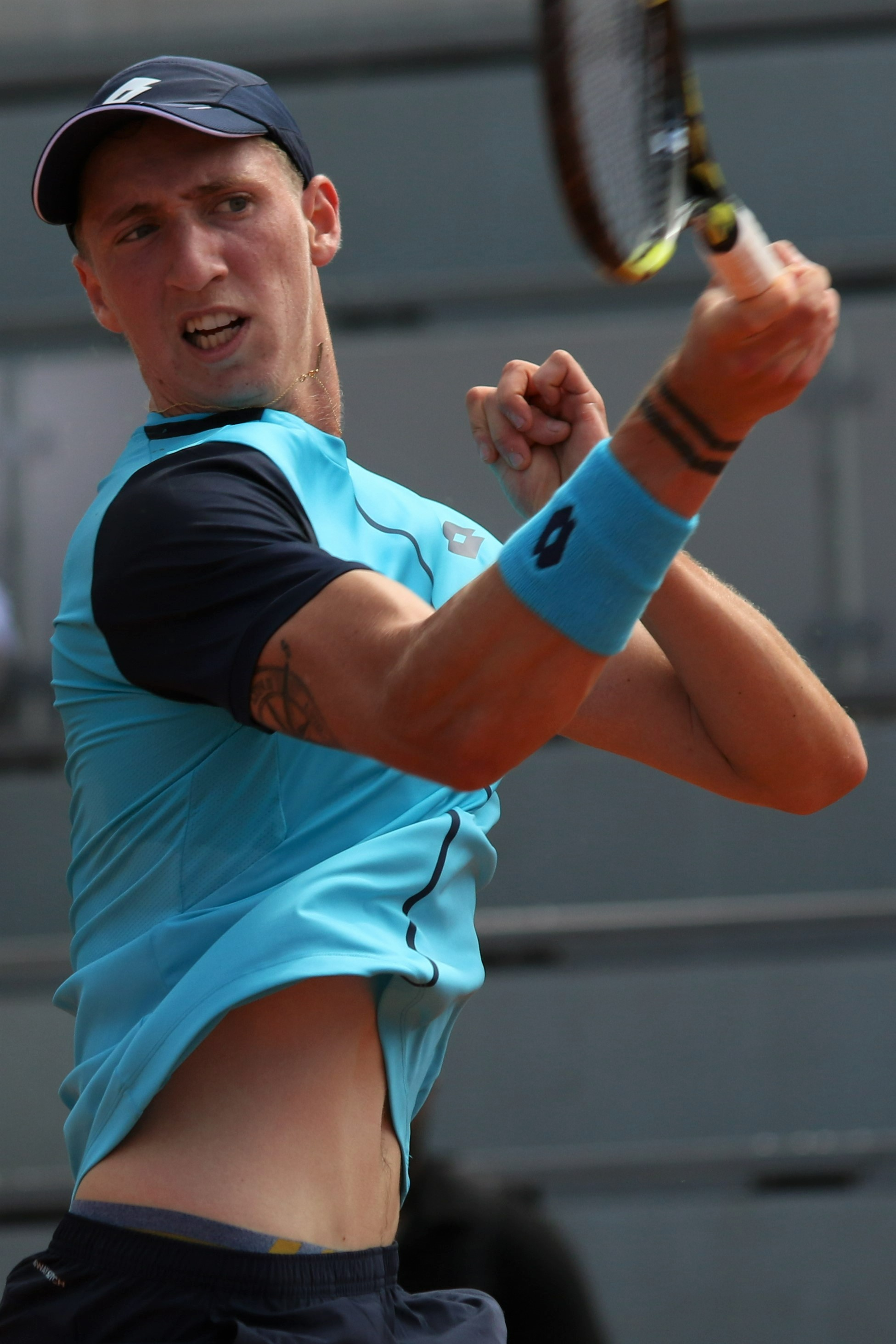
- Gueymard Wayenburg at the 2022 French Open
- Country (sports): France
- Born: 1 August 2003 (age 23) Aix-en-Provence, France
- Height: 1.91 m (6 ft 3 in)
- Plays: Right-handed (two-handed backhand)
- Coach: Jonathan Kanar, Arnaud Agniel
- Prize money: US $430,710

Singles
- Career record: 0–0 (at ATP Tour level, Grand Slam level, and in Davis Cup)
- Career titles: 0
- Highest ranking: No. 181 (19 October 2026)
- Current ranking: No. 191 (16 November 2026)

Grand Slam singles results
- Australian Open: Q1 (2026)
- French Open: Q2 (2023, 2025)
- US Open: Q1 (2025)

Doubles
- Career record: 1–3 (at ATP Tour level, Grand Slam level, and in Davis Cup)
- Career titles: 0
- Highest ranking: No. 349 (9 December 2024)
- Current ranking: No. 1,471 (19 October 2026)

Grand Slam doubles results
- French Open: 1R (2022, 2023)
- Last updated on: 19 November 2026.

Sascha Gueymard Wayenburg (born 1 August 2003) is a French tennis player. He has a career high ATP singles ranking of world No. 181 achieved on 19 October 2026 and a career high ATP doubles ranking of No. 349 achieved on 9 December 2024.

== Professional career ==
=== 2022: ATP and Major doubles debuts ===
Gueymard Wayenburg made his ATP Tour debut and registered his maiden ATP win by reaching the quarterfinal at the 2022 Open Sud de France after receiving a wildcard into the doubles main draw with Luca Van Assche. He also made his Grand Slam debut in doubles at the 2022 French Open as a wildcard pair also partnering with Luca Van Assche.

=== 2024: Maiden Challenger doubles title ===
Gueymard Wayenburg won his maiden Challenger doubles title at the 2024 Open d'Orléans, partnering with Benjamin Bonzi. The pair defeated Manuel Guinard and Grégoire Jacq in the final.

=== 2025: Maiden Challenger singles title, top 200 ===
In January, Gueymard Wayenburg won his first career Challenger singles title as a qualifier in Quimper, defeating defending champion Pierre-Hugues Herbert in the final. As a result, he entered the top 300 at world No. 253 on 27 January 2025.

In July, Gueymard Wayenburg reached his second Challenger final at the Tampere Open, losing to Nicolai Budkov Kjær in the final. At the end of the 2025 season, Gueymard Wayenburg entered the top 200 on 10 November 2025.

=== 2026: Second Challenger title ===
In September, Gueymard Wayenburg won his second Challenger title at the Open de Rennes, defeating second seed Titouan Droguet in the semifinal and Harold Mayot in the final. Later in the month, he reached a second Challenger final at the Open de Vendée, but lost to Clément Chidekh in the final.

== Performance timeline ==
Tournament	2022	2023	2024	2025	2026	SR	W–L	Win%
Grand Slam tournaments
Australian Open	A	A	A	A	Q1	0 / 0	0–0	–
French Open	Q1	Q2	Q1	Q2	Q1	0 / 0	0–0	–
Wimbledon	A	A	A	A	A	0 / 0	0–0	–
US Open	A	A	A	Q1	A	0 / 0	0–0	–
Win–loss	0–0	0–0	0–0	0–0	0–0	0 / 0	0–0	–

== ATP Challenger Tour Finals ==
=== Singles: 4 (2 titles, 2 runner-ups) ===
Legend (singles) ATP Challenger Tour (2–2)	Titles by surface Hard (2–1) Clay (0–1)

Result	W–L	Date	Tournament	Tier	Surface	Opponent	Score
Win	1–0	Jan 2025	Quimper, France	Challenger	Hard (i)	(France) Pierre-Hugues Herbert	6–7^{(3–7)}, 6–1, 6–2
Loss	1–1	Jul 2025	Tampere, Finland	Challenger	Clay	(Norway) Nicolai Budkov Kjær	6–7^{(5–7)}, 7–6^{(7–2)}, 2–6
Win	2–1	Sep 2026	Rennes, France	Challenger	Hard (i)	(France) Harold Mayot	4–6, 6–3, 7–5
Loss	2–2	Sep 2026	Open de Vendée, France	Challenger	Hard (i)	(France) Clément Chidekh	2–6, 0–6

=== Doubles: 1 (1 title, 0 runner-up) ===
Legend (doubles) ATP Challenger Tour (1-0)	Titles by surface Hard (1–0) Clay (0–0)

Result	W–L	Date	Tournament	Tier	Surface	Partner	Opponent	Score
Win	1–0	Sep 2024	Orléans, France	Challenger	Hard (i)	(France) Benjamin Bonzi	(France) Manuel Guinard (France) Grégoire Jacq	7–6^{(9–7)}, 4–6, [10-5]

== ITF World Tennis Tour Finals ==
=== Singles: 9 (4 titles, 5 runner-ups) ===
Legend (singles) ITF World Tennis Tour Tour (4–5)	Titles by surface Hard (3–3) Clay (1–2) Grass (0–0) Carpet (0–0)

Result	W–L	Date	Tournament	Tier	Surface	Opponent	Score
Loss	0–1	Feb 2022	M15, Grenoble, France	World Tennis Tour	Hard (i)	(Russia) Alexey Vatutin	4-6, 1-6
Loss	0–2	Feb 2022	M15, Oberhaching, Germany	World Tennis Tour	Hard (i)	(Germany) Marvin Moeller	3-6, 6-4, 5-7
Win	1–2	May 2022	M25+H, Ajaccio, France	World Tennis Tour	Hard	(France) Dan Added	6-4, 5-7, 6-4
Win	2–2	Mar 2023	M15, Poitiers, France	World Tennis Tour	Hard (i)	(France) Antoine Ghibaudo	7-6^{(9–7)}, 6-4
Win	3–2	Apr 2023	M15, Lons-le-Saunier, France	World Tennis Tour	Hard (i)	(Germany) Florian Broska	6-4, 7-6^{(7–5)}
Loss	3–3	Jun 2023	M25, Skopje, North Macedonia	World Tennis Tour	Clay	(North Macedonia) Kalin Ivanovski	6-7^{(2–7)}, 3-6
Loss	3–4	Oct 2023	M25, Nevers, France	World Tennis Tour	Hard (i)	(Germany) Marvin Möller	6-2, 6-7^{(4–7)}, 4-6
Win	4–4	Apr 2024	M15, Kursumlijska Banja, Serbia	World Tennis Tour	Clay	(Belgium) Emilien Demanet	6-3, 7-5
Loss	4–5	May 2024	M15, Bol, Croatia	World Tennis Tour	Clay	(Croatia) Luka Mikrut	3-6, 3-6

=== Doubles 6 (6 titles, 0 runner-up) ===
Legend (doubles) ITF World Tennis Tour (6–0)	Titles by surface Hard (2–0) Clay (4–0) Grass (0–0) Carpet (0–0)

Result	W–L	Date	Tournament	Tier	Surface	Partner	Opponents	Score
Win	1–0	Apr 2022	M25 Angers, France	World Tennis Tour	Clay	(France) Titouan Droguet	(France) Lucas Bouquet (France) Alexis Musialek	6–3, 4–6, [10–3]
Win	2–0	Oct 2022	M25 Nevers, France	World Tennis Tour	Hard (i)	(France) Antoine Hoang	(Argentina) Federico Agustín Gómez (United Kingdom) Marcus Willis	6–7^{(10–12)}, 7–6^{(7–5)}, [10–7]
Win	3–0	Mar 2023	M15 Créteil, France	World Tennis Tour	Hard (i)	(France) Antoine Hoang	(France) Arthur Bouquier (France) Mathieu Scaglia	7–5, 5–7, [10–5]
Win	4–0	Apr 2023	M25 Angers, France	World Tennis Tour	Clay	(France) Grégoire Jacq	(Germany) Niklas Schell (France) Constantin Bittoun Kouzmine	4–6, 7–6^{(8–6)}, [10–5]
Win	5–0	May 2023	M25 Sabadell, Spain	World Tennis Tour	Clay	(France) Grégoire Jacq	(Spain) Oriol Roca Batalla (Spain) Íñigo Cervantes	6–4, 6–3
Win	6–0	Jun 2023	M25 Skopje, North Macedonia	World Tennis Tour	Clay	(France) Antoine Hoang	(Bulgaria) Petr Nesterov (Bulgaria) Yanaki Milev	6–1, 6–2
