= 2025 Crete Challenger V – Singles =

Singles
- 2025 Crete Challenger V

Final
- Champion: (United Kingdom) Ryan Peniston
- Runner-up: (Belgium) Kimmer Coppejans
- Score: 6–3, 7–5

Events
Singles	Doubles
- Crete Challenger

Moez Echargui was the defending champion but chose not to defend his title.

Ryan Peniston won the title after defeating Kimmer Coppejans 6–3, 7–5 in the final.

== Seeds ==
1. (Belgium) Kimmer Coppejans (final)
2. (United Kingdom) Oliver Crawford (first round)
3. (Italy) Federico Cinà (first round)
4. (United Kingdom) Ryan Peniston (champion)
5. (United Kingdom) George Loffhagen (second round)
6. (Belgium) Gilles-Arnaud Bailly (second round)
7. (France) Geoffrey Blancaneaux (first round)
8. (Bulgaria) Dimitar Kuzmanov (second round, withdrew)

== Draw ==
Key

- Q = Qualifier
- WC = Wild card
- LL = Lucky loser
- Alt = Alternate
- ITF = ITF entry
- PR = Protected ranking
- SR = Special ranking
- SE = Special exempt
- JE = Junior exempt
- JR = Junior Accelerator Programme entrant
- CO = College Accelerator Programme entrant
- NG = Next Gen Accelerator Program entrant
- w/o = Walkover
- r = Retired
- d = Defaulted

=== Finals ===
Semifinals
1	(Belgium) Kimmer Coppejans	4	7^{9}	6
(Czech Republic) Hynek Bartoň	6	6^{7}	3
4	(United Kingdom) Ryan Peniston	7^{7}	6
(France) Antoine Escoffier	6^{4}	1

Final
1	(Belgium) Kimmer Coppejans	3	5
4	(United Kingdom) Ryan Peniston	6	7

=== Top half ===
First round
1	(Belgium) K Coppejans	0	7^{7}	6
(Lithuania) E Butvilas	6	6^{5}	2
Q	(United Kingdom) T Samuel	6	6
JR	(Netherlands) M Röttgering	3	1
Alt	(India) K Singh	2	3
Q	(Moldova) R Albot	6	6
Alt	(Austria) D Novak	2	3
8	(Bulgaria) D Kuzmanov	6	6
3	(Italy) F Cinà	3	1
(Spain) I Montes de la Torre	6	6
(United Kingdom) G Hussey	1	1
Q	(United Kingdom) H Wendelken	6	6
(Czech Republic) H Bartoň	6	7^{7}
Q	(United Kingdom) M Basing	4	6^{4}
(Romania) GA Boitan	4	2
5	(United Kingdom) G Loffhagen	6	6

Second round
1	(Belgium) K Coppejans	6	2	6
Q	(United Kingdom) T Samuel	2	6	2
Q	(Moldova) R Albot	w/o
8	(Bulgaria) D Kuzmanov
(Spain) I Montes de la Torre	4	3
Q	(United Kingdom) H Wendelken	6	6
(Czech Republic) H Bartoň	6	6
5	(United Kingdom) G Loffhagen	3	1

Quarterfinals
1	(Belgium) K Coppejans	6	6
Q	(Moldova) R Albot	4	3
Q	(United Kingdom) H Wendelken	3	6	3
(Czech Republic) H Bartoň	6	2	6

Semifinals
1	(Belgium) K Coppejans	4	7^{9}	6
(Czech Republic) H Bartoň	6	6^{7}	3

=== Bottom half ===
First round
6	(Belgium) GA Bailly	6	6
PR	(Bulgaria) A Andreev	2	4
NG	(Czech Republic) M Mrva	3	6^{2}
(Ivory Coast) E Coulibaly	6	7^{7}
WC	(Greece) Pa Tsitsipas	0^{r}
Q	(Netherlands) N Visker	1
Q	(Greece) D Sakellaridis	3	7	2
4	(United Kingdom) R Peniston	6	5	6
7	(France) G Blancaneaux	2	4
(France) A Escoffier	6	6
WC	(Greece) Pe Tsitsipas	4	7	6
(Latvia) R Strombachs	6	5	4
WC	(Greece) Ioannis Xilas	4	4
(Belgium) M Geerts	6	6
(United Kingdom) C Broom	3	7^{7}	6
2	(United Kingdom) O Crawford	6	6^{5}	3

Second round
6	(Belgium) GA Bailly	1	6	1
(Ivory Coast) E Coulibaly	6	3	6
Q	(Netherlands) N Visker	3	1
4	(United Kingdom) R Peniston	6	6
(France) A Escoffier	5	6	7^{7}
WC	(Greece) Pe Tsitsipas	7	2	6^{2}
(Belgium) M Geerts	7	6
(United Kingdom) C Broom	5	4

Quarterfinals
(Ivory Coast) E Coulibaly	5	3
4	(United Kingdom) R Peniston	7	6
(France) A Escoffier	6	2	6
(Belgium) M Geerts	2	6	2

Semifinals
4	(United Kingdom) R Peniston	7^{7}	6
(France) A Escoffier	6^{4}	1
