= 2025 Crete Challenger V =

- Date: 6 – 12 October
- Edition: 5th
- Surface: Hard
- Location: Hersonissos, Greece

Champions

Singles
- (United Kingdom) Ryan Peniston

Doubles
- (Spain) Alberto Barroso Campos / (Spain) Iñaki Montes de la Torre
- Crete Challenger

The 2025 Iconico Crete Challenger V was a professional tennis tournament played on hardcourts. It was the fifth edition of the tournament which was part of the 2025 ATP Challenger Tour. It took place in Hersonissos, Greece between 6 and 12 October 2025.

== Singles main-draw entrants ==
=== Seeds ===
Country	Player	Rank^{1}	Seed
BEL	Kimmer Coppejans	183	1
GBR	Oliver Crawford	185	2
ITA	Federico Cinà	218	3
GBR	Ryan Peniston	224	4
GBR	George Loffhagen	250	5
BEL	Gilles-Arnaud Bailly	252	6
FRA	Geoffrey Blancaneaux	257	7
BUL	Dimitar Kuzmanov	261	8

- ^{1} Rankings are as of 29 September 2025.

=== Other entrants ===
The following players received wildcards into the singles main draw:

- (Greece) Pavlos Tsitsipas
- (Greece) Petros Tsitsipas
- (Greece) Ioannis Xilas

The following player received entry into the singles main draw using a protected ranking:

- (Bulgaria) Adrian Andreev

The following player received entry into the singles main draw through the Junior Accelerator programme:

- (Netherlands) Mees Röttgering

The following player received entry into the singles main draw through the Next Gen Accelerator programme:

- (Czech Republic) Maxim Mrva

The following players received entry into the singles main draw as alternates:

- (Austria) Dennis Novak
- (India) Karan Singh

The following players received entry from the qualifying draw:

- (Moldova) Radu Albot
- (United Kingdom) Max Basing
- (Greece) Dimitris Sakellaridis
- (United Kingdom) Toby Samuel
- (Netherlands) Niels Visker
- (United Kingdom) Harry Wendelken

== Champions ==
=== Singles ===
- (United Kingdom) Ryan Peniston def. (Belgium) Kimmer Coppejans 6–3, 7–5.

=== Doubles ===
- (Spain) Alberto Barroso Campos / (Spain) Iñaki Montes de la Torre def. (Czech Republic) David Poljak / (France) Max Westphal 7–5, 7–6^{(7–3)}.
