= 2025 Crete Challenger IV – Singles =

Singles
- 2025 Crete Challenger IV

Final
- Champion: (Tunisia) Moez Echargui
- Runner-up: (France) Dan Added
- Score: 5–7, 6–4, 3–0 ret.

Events
Singles	Doubles
- Crete Challenger

Rafael Jódar was the defending champion but lost in the semifinals to Dan Added.

Moez Echargui won the title after Added retired while trailing 7–5, 4–6, 0–3 in the final.

== Seeds ==
1. (Tunisia) Moez Echargui (champion)
2. (Czech Republic) Marek Gengel (first round)
3. (France) Matteo Martineau (first round)
4. (Switzerland) Jakub Paul (quarterfinals)
5. (Greece) Stefanos Sakellaridis (quarterfinals)
6. (France) Robin Bertrand (semifinals)
7. (France) Dan Added (final, retired)
8. (United States) Christian Langmo (second round)

== Draw ==
Key

- Q = Qualifier
- WC = Wild card
- LL = Lucky loser
- Alt = Alternate
- ITF = ITF entry
- PR = Protected ranking
- SR = Special ranking
- SE = Special exempt
- JE = Junior exempt
- JR = Junior Accelerator Programme entrant
- CO = College Accelerator Programme entrant
- NG = Next Gen Accelerator Program entrant
- w/o = Walkover
- r = Retired
- d = Defaulted

=== Finals ===
Semifinals
1	(Tunisia) Moez Echargui	6	6
6	(France) Robin Bertrand	4	1
(Spain) Rafael Jódar	6^{5}	5
7	(France) Dan Added	7^{7}	7

Final
1	(Tunisia) Moez Echargui	5	6	3
7	(France) Dan Added	7	4	0^{r}

=== Top half ===
First round
1	(Tunisia) M Echargui	4	6	6
CO	(Japan) JD Friend	6	2	4
LL	(Italy) Luca Castagnola	6	6^{6}	4
WC	(Greece) Pa Tsitsipas	3	7^{8}	6
(Greece) A Thanos	6	4	3
(Germany) M Rosenkranz	4	6	6
(France) L Lokoli	3	1
8	(United States) Christian Langmo	6	6
4	(Switzerland) J Paul	6	6
Q	(United Kingdom) H Wendelken	2	2
PR	(Jamaica) B Bicknell	7^{7}	6
Q	(Italy) Luca Potenza	6^{2}	1
Q	(Italy) F Moroni	6	6
(Italy) Fabrizio Andaloro	4	4
WC	(Greece) Dimitris Azoidis	4	0
6	(France) R Bertrand	6	6

Second round
1	(Tunisia) M Echargui	4	6	6
WC	(Greece) Pa Tsitsipas	6	4	2
(Germany) M Rosenkranz	4	7^{7}	6
8	(United States) C Langmo	6	6^{2}	2
4	(Switzerland) J Paul	6	4	6
PR	(Jamaica) B Bicknell	3	6	0
Q	(Italy) F Moroni	6	4	2
6	(France) R Bertrand	2	6	6

Quarterfinals
1	(Tunisia) M Echargui	7^{7}	6
(Germany) M Rosenkranz	6^{5}	3
4	(Switzerland) J Paul	6	5	4
6	(France) R Bertrand	4	7	6

Semifinals
1	(Tunisia) M Echargui	6	6
6	(France) R Bertrand	4	1

=== Bottom half ===
First round
5	(Greece) S Sakellaridis	3	6	6
Q	(Italy) Massimo Giunta	6	3	2
(Germany) M Wiskandt	7	4	4
(Thailand) M Jones	5	6	6
(Spain) R Jódar	6	6
Q	(France) Enzo Wallart	3	3
(France) L Poullain	6	6
3	(France) M Martineau	3	3
7	(France) D Added	7^{7}	6
Q	(Italy) Pietro Fellin	6^{4}	4
(United Kingdom) H Searle	6	6
Alt	(France) A Reymond	2	3
(Ukraine) Vadym Ursu	3	6	4
WC	(Greece) Ioannis Xilas	6	4	6
(United Kingdom) S Parker	6	6
2	(Czech Republic) M Gengel	1	1

Second round
5	(Greece) S Sakellaridis	7^{7}	5	6
(Thailand) M Jones	6^{2}	7	0
(Spain) R Jódar	6	6
(France) L Poullain	4	3
7	(France) D Added	7	6
(United Kingdom) H Searle	5	2
WC	(Greece) I Xilas	4	6	6
(United Kingdom) S Parker	6	4	2

Quarterfinals
5	(Greece) S Sakellaridis	0	1
(Spain) R Jódar	6	6
7	(France) D Added	7	6
WC	(Greece) I Xilas	5	4

Semifinals
(Spain) R Jódar	6^{5}	5
7	(France) D Added	7^{7}	7
