= 2026 Crete Challenger II – Doubles =

Doubles
- 2026 Crete Challenger II

Final
- Champions: (Belgium) Michael Geerts (Portugal) Tiago Pereira
- Runners-up: (Bulgaria) Petr Nesterov (Ukraine) Oleksandr Ovcharenko
- Score: 3–6, 6–4, [10–5]

Events
Singles	Doubles
- Crete Challenger

Jacopo Berrettini and Kimmer Coppejans were the defending champions but chose not to defend their title.

Michael Geerts and Tiago Pereira won the title after defeating Petr Nesterov and Oleksandr Ovcharenko 3–6, 6–4, [10–5] in the final.

== Seeds ==
1. (Belgium) Michael Geerts / (Portugal) Tiago Pereira (champions)
2. (Spain) Mario Mansilla Díez / (Colombia) Adrià Soriano Barrera (first round)
3. (Serbia) Ivan Sabanov / (Serbia) Matej Sabanov (quarterfinals)
4. (Venezuela) Juan José Bianchi / (Czech Republic) Jan Jermář (quarterfinals)

== Draw ==
Key

- Q = Qualifier
- WC = Wild card
- LL = Lucky loser
- Alt = Alternate
- ITF = ITF entry
- PR = Protected ranking
- SR = Special ranking
- SE = Special exempt
- JE = Junior exempt
- JR = Junior Accelerator Programme entrant
- CO = College Accelerator Programme entrant
- NG = Next Gen Accelerator Program entrant
- w/o = Walkover
- r = Retired
- d = Defaulted

First round
1	(Belgium) M Geerts (Portugal) T Pereira	6	7^{7}
(United Kingdom) F Bass (Bulgaria) A Genov	0	6^{4}
(United Kingdom) T Hands (United Kingdom) H Wendelken	4	3
WC	(Cyprus) M Efstathiou (Cyprus) E Neos	6	6
3	(Serbia) I Sabanov (Serbia) M Sabanov	7^{7}	6
(Spain) Ignasi Forcano (Australia) C Puttergill	6^{5}	4
(United States) S Dostanic (Greece) Ioannis Xilas	6	3	[10]
(United Kingdom) G Hussey (United Kingdom) M Whitehouse	3	6	[7]
Alt	(Bulgaria) P Nesterov (Ukraine) O Ovcharenko	7	6
(Spain) J Barranco Cosano (Peru) A Merino	5	1
(Italy) Simone Agostini (France) R Bertrand	4	2
4	(Venezuela) Juan José Bianchi (Czech Republic) J Jermář	6	6
(France) C Bittoun Kouzmine (South Africa) P Henning	6	6
WC	(Greece) Pa Tsitsipas (Greece) Pe Tsitsipas	2	2
(Belgium) B Gadamauri (Thailand) M Jones	1	6	[10]
2	(Spain) M Mansilla Díez (Colombia) A Soriano Barrera	6	3	[5]

Quarterfinals
1	(Belgium) M Geerts (Portugal) T Pereira	6	6
WC	(Cyprus) M Efstathiou (Cyprus) E Neos	4	2
3	(Serbia) I Sabanov (Serbia) M Sabanov	2	7^{7}	[8]
(United States) S Dostanic (Greece) I Xilas	6	6^{4}	[10]
Alt	(Bulgaria) P Nesterov (Ukraine) O Ovcharenko	3	6	[10]
4	(Venezuela) JJ Bianchi (Czech Republic) J Jermář	6	2	[4]
(France) C Bittoun Kouzmine (South Africa) P Henning	6	6
(Belgium) B Gadamauri (Thailand) M Jones	3	4

Semifinals
1	(Belgium) M Geerts (Portugal) T Pereira	6	7^{7}
(United States) S Dostanic (Greece) I Xilas	1	6^{4}
Alt	(Bulgaria) P Nesterov (Ukraine) O Ovcharenko	6	6
(France) C Bittoun Kouzmine (South Africa) P Henning	1	2

Final
1	(Belgium) M Geerts (Portugal) T Pereira	3	6	[10]
Alt	(Bulgaria) P Nesterov (Ukraine) O Ovcharenko	6	4	[5]
