= 2026 Crete Challenger – Doubles =

Doubles
- 2026 Crete Challenger

Final
- Champions: (Italy) Jacopo Berrettini (Belgium) Kimmer Coppejans
- Runners-up: (United Kingdom) Finn Bass (Bulgaria) Anthony Genov
- Score: 3–6, 6–1, [10–3]

Events
Singles	Doubles
- Crete Challenger

Giles Hussey and Mark Whitehouse were the defending champions but only Whitehouse chose to defend his title, partnering Connor Thomson. They lost in the quarterfinals to Finn Bass and Anthony Genov.

Jacopo Berrettini and Kimmer Coppejans won the title after defeating Bass and Genov 3–6, 6–1, [10–3] in the final.

== Seeds ==
1. (Belgium) Michael Geerts / (Portugal) Tiago Pereira (first round)
2. (Netherlands) Jarno Jans / (Czech Republic) David Poljak (quarterfinals)
3. (Venezuela) Juan José Bianchi / (Czech Republic) Jan Jermář (first round)
4. (Serbia) Ivan Sabanov / (Serbia) Matej Sabanov (first round)

== Draw ==
Key

- Q = Qualifier
- WC = Wild card
- LL = Lucky loser
- Alt = Alternate
- ITF = ITF entry
- PR = Protected ranking
- SR = Special ranking
- SE = Special exempt
- JE = Junior exempt
- JR = Junior Accelerator Programme entrant
- CO = College Accelerator Programme entrant
- NG = Next Gen Accelerator Program entrant
- w/o = Walkover
- r = Retired
- d = Defaulted

First round
1	(Belgium) M Geerts (Portugal) T Pereira	2	4
(United Kingdom) F Bass (Bulgaria) A Genov	6	6
(Spain) J Barranco Cosano (Peru) A Merino	3	5
(United Kingdom) C Thomson (United Kingdom) M Whitehouse	6	7
4	(Serbia) I Sabanov (Serbia) M Sabanov	6^{1}	4
(United Kingdom) T Hands (United Kingdom) H Wendelken	7^{7}	6
(Spain) D Rincón (Jordan) A Shelbayh	3	6^{4}
(Spain) M Mansilla Díez (Colombia) A Soriano Barrera	6	7^{7}
(France) C Bittoun Kouzmine (South Africa) P Henning	5	6^{3}
Alt	(Bulgaria) P Nesterov (Ukraine) O Ovcharenko	7	7^{7}
WC	(Greece) Pa Tsitsipas (Greece) Pe Tsitsipas	5	6	[16]
3	(Venezuela) Juan José Bianchi (Czech Republic) J Jermář	7	3	[14]
(Italy) J Berrettini (Belgium) K Coppejans	6	6
(France) R Bertrand (Thailand) M Jones	2	1
WC	(Cyprus) M Efstathiou (Cyprus) E Neos	2	6^{5}
2	(Netherlands) J Jans (Czech Republic) D Poljak	6	7^{7}

Quarterfinals
(United Kingdom) F Bass (Bulgaria) A Genov	6	6
(United Kingdom) C Thomson (United Kingdom) M Whitehouse	4	4
(United Kingdom) T Hands (United Kingdom) H Wendelken	6	3	[10]
(Spain) M Mansilla Díez (Colombia) A Soriano Barrera	3	6	[7]
Alt	(Bulgaria) P Nesterov (Ukraine) O Ovcharenko	6	4	[2]
WC	(Greece) Pa Tsitsipas (Greece) Pe Tsitsipas	3	6	[10]
(Italy) J Berrettini (Belgium) K Coppejans	6	4	[10]
2	(Netherlands) J Jans (Czech Republic) D Poljak	3	6	[4]

Semifinals
(United Kingdom) F Bass (Bulgaria) A Genov	6	6
(United Kingdom) T Hands (United Kingdom) H Wendelken	4	2
WC	(Greece) Pa Tsitsipas (Greece) Pe Tsitsipas	4	4
(Italy) J Berrettini (Belgium) K Coppejans	6	6

Final
(United Kingdom) F Bass (Bulgaria) A Genov	6	1	[3]
(Italy) J Berrettini (Belgium) K Coppejans	3	6	[10]
