= 2025 Crete Challenger III – Doubles =

Doubles
- 2025 Crete Challenger III

Final
- Champions: (Italy) Filippo Moroni (United Kingdom) Stuart Parker
- Runners-up: (France) Dan Added (France) Arthur Reymond
- Score: 6–4, 6–4

Events
Singles	Doubles
- Crete Challenger

Stefanos Sakellaridis and Petros Tsitsipas were the defending champions but chose to defend their title with different partners. Sakellaridis partnered Maximus Jones but lost in the first round to Thijmen Loof and Harry Wendelken. Tsitsipas partnered Aristotelis Thanos but lost in the first round to Marek Gengel and Jan Jermář.

Filippo Moroni and Stuart Parker won the title after defeating Dan Added and Arthur Reymond 6–4, 6–4 in the final.

== Seeds ==
1. (Czech Republic) David Poljak / (China) Wang Aoran (semifinals)
2. (Romania) Victor Vlad Cornea / (France) Matteo Martineau (quarterfinals)
3. (United Kingdom) Scott Duncan / (United Kingdom) Tom Hands (quarterfinals)
4. (Netherlands) Thijmen Loof / (United Kingdom) Harry Wendelken (quarterfinals)

== Draw ==
Key

- Q = Qualifier
- WC = Wild card
- LL = Lucky loser
- Alt = Alternate
- ITF = ITF entry
- PR = Protected ranking
- SR = Special ranking
- SE = Special exempt
- JE = Junior exempt
- JR = Junior Accelerator Programme entrant
- CO = College Accelerator Programme entrant
- NG = Next Gen Accelerator Program entrant
- w/o = Walkover
- r = Retired
- d = Defaulted

=== Draw ===
First round
1	(Czech Republic) D Poljak (China) A Wang	6	0	[10]
Alt	(Italy) Luca Castagnola (Italy) Pietro Fellin	2	6	[5]
(Czech Republic) M Gengel (Czech Republic) J Jermář	4	7	[10]
(Greece) A Thanos (Greece) Pe Tsitsipas	6	5	[8]
3	(United Kingdom) S Duncan (United Kingdom) T Hands	7^{7}	6
(Spain) Í Cervantes; D Golubev	6^{4}	4
Alt	(Italy) F Moroni (United Kingdom) S Parker	6	6
(China) J Cui (China) R Te	4	2
Alt	I Nedelko (France) T Papamalamis
(France) D Added (France) A Reymond	w/o
(Thailand) M Jones (Greece) S Sakellaridis	6^{6}	5
4	(Netherlands) T Loof (United Kingdom) H Wendelken	7^{8}	7
(Bulgaria) A Genov (Israel) R Stepanov	3	5
(United States) Christian Langmo (Italy) Luca Potenza	6	7
WC	(Greece) Michalis Sakellaridis (Greece) Pa Tsitsipas	1	2
2	(Romania) V Cornea (France) M Martineau	6	6

Quarterfinals
1	(Czech Republic) D Poljak (China) A Wang	6	6
(Czech Republic) M Gengel (Czech Republic) J Jermář	4	4
3	(United Kingdom) S Duncan (United Kingdom) T Hands	3	5
Alt	(Italy) F Moroni (United Kingdom) S Parker	6	7
(France) D Added (France) A Reymond	6	6^{5}	[15]
4	(Netherlands) T Loof (United Kingdom) H Wendelken	3	7^{7}	[13]
(United States) C Langmo (Italy) L Potenza	2	6	[10]
2	(Romania) V Cornea (France) M Martineau	6	4	[5]

Semifinals
1	(Czech Republic) D Poljak (China) A Wang	3	7	[7]
Alt	(Italy) F Moroni (United Kingdom) S Parker	6	5	[10]
(France) D Added (France) A Reymond	6	7
(United States) C Langmo (Italy) L Potenza	3	5

Final
Alt	(Italy) F Moroni (United Kingdom) S Parker	6	6
(France) D Added (France) A Reymond	4	4
