= 2025 Crete Challenger IV – Doubles =

Doubles
- 2025 Crete Challenger IV

Final
- Champions: (Germany) Mats Rosenkranz (United Kingdom) Harry Wendelken
- Runners-up: (Romania) Victor Vlad Cornea (Finland) Patrik Niklas-Salminen
- Score: 4–6, 6–4, [10–7]

Events
Singles	Doubles
- Crete Challenger

Filippo Moroni and Stuart Parker were the defending champions but only Parker chose to defend his title, partnering Vadym Ursu. They lost in the quarterfinals to Stefanos Sakellaridis and Petros Tsitsipas.

Mats Rosenkranz and Harry Wendelken won the title after defeating Victor Vlad Cornea and Patrik Niklas-Salminen 4–6, 6–4, [10–7] in the final.

== Seeds ==
1. (Romania) Victor Vlad Cornea / (Finland) Patrik Niklas-Salminen (final)
2. (United Kingdom) Scott Duncan / (United Kingdom) Tom Hands (quarterfinals)
3. (Bulgaria) Anthony Genov / (Israel) Roy Stepanov (quarterfinals)
4. (France) Dan Added / (France) Arthur Reymond (first round)

== Draw ==
Key

- Q = Qualifier
- WC = Wild card
- LL = Lucky loser
- Alt = Alternate
- ITF = ITF entry
- PR = Protected ranking
- SR = Special ranking
- SE = Special exempt
- JE = Junior exempt
- JR = Junior Accelerator Programme entrant
- CO = College Accelerator Programme entrant
- NG = Next Gen Accelerator Program entrant
- w/o = Walkover
- r = Retired
- d = Defaulted

=== Draw ===
First round
1	(Romania) V Cornea (Finland) P Niklas-Salminen	6	6
(Italy) Luca Castagnola (Italy) Pietro Fellin	1	2
WC	(Greece) Pa Tsitsipas (France) Enzo Wallart	6	6
WC	(Greece) Dimitris Azoidis (Cyprus) E Neos	3	3
4	(France) D Added (France) A Reymond	6	4	[7]
(Greece) S Sakellaridis (Greece) Pe Tsitsipas	2	6	[10]
(Czech Republic) M Gengel (Czech Republic) J Jermář	4	2
(United Kingdom) S Parker (Ukraine) Vadym Ursu	6	6
(Spain) Í Cervantes; D Golubev	3	3
(Italy) Fabrizio Andaloro (Italy) Massimo Giunta	6	6
(Philippines) FC Alcantara (Malaysia) Mistuki Wei Kang Leong	6^{6}	6	[7]
3	(Bulgaria) A Genov (Israel) R Stepanov	7^{8}	3	[10]
(United States) Christian Langmo (Italy) Luca Potenza	5	3
(Germany) M Rosenkranz (United Kingdom) H Wendelken	7	6
(United States) S Bangoura (France) R Bertrand	6^{8}	6	[7]
2	(United Kingdom) S Duncan (United Kingdom) T Hands	7^{10}	3	[10]

Quarterfinals
1	(Romania) V Cornea (Finland) P Niklas-Salminen	6^{5}	6	[10]
WC	(Greece) Pa Tsitsipas (France) E Wallart	7^{7}	3	[5]
(Greece) S Sakellaridis (Greece) Pe Tsitsipas	7	6
(United Kingdom) S Parker (Ukraine) V Ursu	5	3
(Italy) F Andaloro (Italy) M Giunta	7	1	[10]
3	(Bulgaria) A Genov (Israel) R Stepanov	5	6	[4]
(Germany) M Rosenkranz (United Kingdom) H Wendelken	6	6
2	(United Kingdom) S Duncan (United Kingdom) T Hands	4	0

Semifinals
1	(Romania) V Cornea (Finland) P Niklas-Salminen	7	6
(Greece) S Sakellaridis (Greece) Pe Tsitsipas	5	4
(Italy) F Andaloro (Italy) M Giunta	6	4	[6]
(Germany) M Rosenkranz (United Kingdom) H Wendelken	4	6	[10]

Final
1	(Romania) V Cornea (Finland) P Niklas-Salminen	6	4	[7]
(Germany) M Rosenkranz (United Kingdom) H Wendelken	4	6	[10]
