= 2026 Crete Challenger II – Singles =

Singles
- 2026 Crete Challenger II

Final
- Champion: (United Kingdom) Toby Samuel
- Runner-up: (Czech Republic) Maxim Mrva
- Score: 6–2, 6–3

Events
Singles	Doubles
- Crete Challenger

Toby Samuel was the defending champion and successfully defended his title after defeating Maxim Mrva 6–2, 6–3 in the final.

== Seeds ==
1. (Italy) Lorenzo Giustino (quarterfinals)
2. (United Kingdom) Toby Samuel (champion)
3. (Germany) Tom Gentzsch (second round)
4. (Belgium) Kimmer Coppejans (quarterfinals)
5. (Bulgaria) Dimitar Kuzmanov (first round)
6. (Portugal) Tiago Pereira (first round)
7. (United Kingdom) Harry Wendelken (second round)
8. (France) Robin Bertrand (quarterfinals)

== Draw ==
Key

- Q = Qualifier
- WC = Wild card
- LL = Lucky loser
- Alt = Alternate
- ITF = ITF entry
- PR = Protected ranking
- SR = Special ranking
- SE = Special exempt
- JE = Junior exempt
- JR = Junior Accelerator Programme entrant
- CO = College Accelerator Programme entrant
- NG = Next Gen Accelerator Program entrant
- w/o = Walkover
- r = Retired
- d = Defaulted

=== Finals ===
Semifinals
(United Kingdom) Paul Jubb	3	1
(Czech Republic) Maxim Mrva	6	6
(United States) Stefan Dostanic	2	5
2	(United Kingdom) Toby Samuel	6	7

Final
(Czech Republic) Maxim Mrva	2	3
2	(United Kingdom) Toby Samuel	6	6

=== Top half ===
First round
1	(Italy) L Giustino	6^{5}	6	6
(Norway) V Durasovic	7^{7}	4	3
Q	(Hungary) Péter Makk	3	4
(South Africa) P Henning	6	6
WC	(Greece) Pa Tsitsipas	6^{4}	3
(United Kingdom) P Jubb	7^{7}	6
(United Kingdom) G Hussey	6^{5}	5
7	(United Kingdom) H Wendelken	7^{7}	7
3	(Germany) T Gentzsch	2	6	6
(Italy) J Berrettini	6	4	2
Q	(Bulgaria) P Nesterov	3	6	6
(Thailand) M Jones	6	3	4
NG	(Italy) Lorenzo Carboni	2	3
Q	(Italy) Federico Iannaccone	6	6
(Czech Republic) M Mrva	6	6
5	(Bulgaria) D Kuzmanov	2	4

Second round
1	(Italy) L Giustino	6	4	6
(South Africa) P Henning	3	6	3
(United Kingdom) P Jubb	6	6
7	(United Kingdom) H Wendelken	1	2
3	(Germany) T Gentzsch	6^{7}	2
Q	(Bulgaria) P Nesterov	7^{9}	6
Q	(Italy) F Iannaccone	4	7^{7}	0
(Czech Republic) M Mrva	6	6^{3}	6

Quarterfinals
1	(Italy) L Giustino	6^{0}	7^{7}	4
(United Kingdom) P Jubb	7^{7}	6^{0}	6
Q	(Bulgaria) P Nesterov	3	3
(Czech Republic) M Mrva	6	6

Semifinals
(United Kingdom) P Jubb	3	1
(Czech Republic) M Mrva	6	6

=== Bottom half ===
First round
6	(Portugal) T Pereira	0	2
(Belgium) M Geerts	6	6
JR	(Switzerland) H Bernet	3	4
(United States) S Dostanic	6	6
Q	(Spain) J Barranco Cosano	2	2^{r}
(Jordan) A Shelbayh	6	4
Alt	(Italy) G Piraino	1	6	5
4	(Belgium) K Coppejans	6	4	7
8	(France) R Bertrand	6	4	6
Q	(United States) Christian Langmo	3	6	4
WC	(Greece) Ioannis Xilas	3	2
(United States) A Rybakov	6	6
(Spain) D Rincón	6^{4}	6	6
Q	(Belgium) B Gadamauri	7^{7}	4	2
WC	(Cyprus) M Efstathiou	6^{2}	1
2	(United Kingdom) T Samuel	7^{7}	6

Second round
(Belgium) M Geerts	3	2
(United States) S Dostanic	6	6
(Jordan) A Shelbayh	6	1	6^{5}
4	(Belgium) K Coppejans	2	6	7^{7}
8	(France) R Bertrand	6	6
(United States) A Rybakov	2	2
(Spain) D Rincón	3	0
2	(United Kingdom) T Samuel	6	6

Quarterfinals
(United States) S Dostanic	6	6
4	(Belgium) K Coppejans	3	4
8	(France) R Bertrand	4	5
2	(United Kingdom) T Samuel	6	7

Semifinals
(United States) S Dostanic	2	5
2	(United Kingdom) T Samuel	6	7
