= 2025 Crete Challenger IV =

- Date: 18 – 23 August
- Edition: 4th
- Surface: Hard
- Location: Hersonissos, Greece

Champions

Singles
- (Tunisia) Moez Echargui

Doubles
- (Germany) Mats Rosenkranz / (United Kingdom) Harry Wendelken
- Crete Challenger

The 2025 Crete Challenger IV was a professional tennis tournament played on hard courts. It was the fourth edition of the tournament which was part of the 2025 ATP Challenger Tour. It took place in Hersonissos, Greece between 18 and 23 August 2025.

== Singles main-draw entrants ==
=== Seeds ===
Country	Player	Rank^{1}	Seed
TUN	Moez Echargui	211	1
CZE	Marek Gengel	250	2
FRA	Matteo Martineau	269	3
SUI	Jakub Paul	295	4
GRE	Stefanos Sakellaridis	317	5
FRA	Robin Bertrand	323	6
FRA	Dan Added	340	7
USA	Christian Langmo	351	8

- ^{1} Rankings are as of 4 August 2025.

=== Other entrants ===
The following players received wildcards into the singles main draw:

- (Greece) Dimitris Azoidis
- (Greece) Pavlos Tsitsipas
- (Greece) Ioannis Xilas

The following player received entry into the singles main draw using a protected ranking:

- (Jamaica) Blaise Bicknell

The following player received entry into the singles main draw through the College Accelerator programme:

- (Japan) Jay Dylan Friend

The following player received entry into the singles main draw as an alternate:

- (France) Arthur Reymond

The following players received entry from the qualifying draw:

- (Italy) Pietro Fellin
- (Italy) Massimo Giunta
- (Italy) Filippo Moroni
- (Italy) Luca Potenza
- (France) Enzo Wallart
- (United Kingdom) Harry Wendelken

The following player received entry as a lucky loser:

- (Italy) Luca Castagnola

== Champions ==
=== Singles ===
- (Tunisia) Moez Echargui def. (France) Dan Added 5–7, 6–4, 3–0 ret.

=== Doubles ===
- (Germany) Mats Rosenkranz / (United Kingdom) Harry Wendelken def. (Romania) Victor Vlad Cornea / (Finland) Patrik Niklas-Salminen 4–6, 6–4, [10–7].
