= 2026 Crete Challenger II =

- Date: 9 – 15 March
- Edition: 8th
- Surface: Hard
- Location: Hersonissos, Greece

Champions

Singles
- (United Kingdom) Toby Samuel

Doubles
- (Belgium) Michael Geerts / (Portugal) Tiago Pereira
- Crete Challenger

The 2026 Crete Challenger II was a professional tennis tournament played on hardcourts. It was the eighth edition of the tournament which was part of the 2026 ATP Challenger Tour. It took place in Hersonissos, Greece between 9 and 15 March 2026.

== Singles main-draw entrants ==
=== Seeds ===
| Country | Player | Rank^{1} | Seed |
|---|---|---|---|
| ITA | Lorenzo Giustino | 204 | 1 |
| GBR | Toby Samuel | 244 | 2 |
| GER | Tom Gentzsch | 246 | 3 |
| BEL | Kimmer Coppejans | 250 | 4 |
| BUL | Dimitar Kuzmanov | 264 | 5 |
| POR | Tiago Pereira | 267 | 6 |
| GBR | Harry Wendelken | 277 | 7 |
| FRA | Robin Bertrand | 295 | 8 |

- ^{1} Rankings are as of 2 March 2026.

=== Other entrants ===
The following players received wildcards into the singles main draw:

- (Cyprus) Menelaos Efstathiou
- (Greece) Pavlos Tsitsipas
- (Greece) Ioannis Xilas

The following player received entry into the singles main draw through the Junior Accelerator programme:

- (Switzerland) Henry Bernet

The following player received entry into the singles main draw through the Next Gen Accelerator programme:

- (Italy) Lorenzo Carboni

The following player received entry into the singles main draw as an alternate:

- (Italy) Gabriele Piraino

The following players received entry from the qualifying draw:

- (Spain) Javier Barranco Cosano
- (Belgium) Buvaysar Gadamauri
- (Italy) Federico Iannaccone
- (United States) Christian Langmo
- (Hungary) Péter Makk
- (Bulgaria) Petr Nesterov

== Champions ==
=== Singles ===
- (United Kingdom) Toby Samuel def. (Czech Republic) Maxim Mrva 6–2, 6–3.

=== Doubles ===
- (Belgium) Michael Geerts / (Portugal) Tiago Pereira def. (Bulgaria) Petr Nesterov / (Ukraine) Oleksandr Ovcharenko 3–6, 6–4, [10–5].
