= 2025 Crete Challenger II =

- Date: 10 – 16 March
- Edition: 2nd
- Surface: Hard
- Location: Hersonissos, Greece

Champions

Singles
- (Bulgaria) Dimitar Kuzmanov

Doubles
- (Greece) Stefanos Sakellaridis / (Greece) Petros Tsitsipas
- Crete Challenger

The 2025 Crete Challenger II was a professional tennis tournament played on hard courts. It was the second edition of the tournament which was part of the 2025 ATP Challenger Tour. It took place in Hersonissos, Greece between 10 and 16 March 2025.

== Singles main-draw entrants ==
=== Seeds ===
Country	Player	Rank^{1}	Seed
KAZ	Timofey Skatov	182	1
	Aslan Karatsev	207	2
UZB	Khumoyun Sultanov	218	3
TPE	Wu Tung-lin	237	4
CZE	Marek Gengel	244	5
LUX	Chris Rodesch	264	6
~~HUN~~	~~Zsombor Piros~~	~~266~~	~~7~~
ITA	Lorenzo Giustino	269	8
GER	Rudolf Molleker	276	9

- ^{1} Rankings are as of 3 March 2025.

=== Other entrants ===
The following players received wildcards into the singles main draw:

- (Italy) Federico Cinà
- (Greece) Stefanos Sakellaridis
- (Greece) Pavlos Tsitsipas

The following player received entry into the singles main draw as a special exempt:

- (United Kingdom) Stuart Parker

The following players received entry into the singles main draw as alternates:

- (Australia) Matthew Dellavedova
- (Italy) Giovanni Fonio

The following players received entry from the qualifying draw:

- (Ukraine) Oleksii Krutykh
- (United Kingdom) Ryan Peniston
- (Thailand) Kasidit Samrej
- (Italy) Marcello Serafini
- (United States) Keegan Smith
- (Germany) Marko Topo

== Champions ==
=== Singles ===
- (Bulgaria) Dimitar Kuzmanov def. (Italy) Federico Cinà 6–4, 6–2.

=== Doubles ===
- (Greece) Stefanos Sakellaridis / (Greece) Petros Tsitsipas def. Ilia Simakin / (Canada) Kelsey Stevenson 6–2, 6–2.
