= 2025 Crete Challenger II – Doubles =

Doubles
- 2025 Crete Challenger II

Final
- Champions: (Greece) Stefanos Sakellaridis (Greece) Petros Tsitsipas
- Runners-up: Ilia Simakin (Canada) Kelsey Stevenson
- Score: 6–2, 6–2

Events
Singles	Doubles
- Crete Challenger

Juan Carlos Prado Ángelo and Mark Whitehouse were the defending champions but chose not to defend their title.

Stefanos Sakellaridis and Petros Tsitsipas won the title after defeating Ilia Simakin and Kelsey Stevenson 6–2, 6–2 in the final.

== Seeds ==
1. (Peru) Alexander Merino / (Germany) Christoph Negritu (first round)
2. (Bulgaria) Alexander Donski / (Spain) Bruno Pujol Navarro (first round)
3. (Italy) Filippo Romano / (Italy) Augusto Virgili (first round)
4. Ilia Simakin / (Canada) Kelsey Stevenson (final)

== Draw ==
Key

- Q = Qualifier
- WC = Wild card
- LL = Lucky loser
- Alt = Alternate
- ITF = ITF entry
- PR = Protected ranking
- SR = Special ranking
- SE = Special exempt
- JE = Junior exempt
- JR = Junior Accelerator Programme entrant
- CO = College Accelerator Programme entrant
- NG = Next Gen Accelerator Program entrant
- w/o = Walkover
- r = Retired
- d = Defaulted

=== Draw ===
First round
1	(Peru) A Merino (Germany) C Negritu	4	6	[7]
(Uzbekistan) K Sultanov (Ukraine) V Uzhylovskyi	6	0	[10]
(United States) K Smith (Chinese Taipei) T-l Wu	6^{10}	6	[7]
(Bulgaria) A Genov (Poland) S Kielan	7^{12}	4	[10]
4	I Simakin (Canada) K Stevenson	6	6^{7}	[10]
(Sweden) E Grevelius (Romania) B Pavel	4	7^{9}	[7]
(Slovakia) M Karol (Colombia) A Soriano Barrera	4	6	[8]
(Serbia) S Latinović (Germany) M Topo	6	3	[10]
WC	(Germany) Henri Haupt (Greece) Pa Tsitsipas	0^{r}
(Greece) S Sakellaridis (Greece) Pe Tsitsipas	5
Alt	(United States) Alex Jones (United States) Miles Jones	6	6
3	(Italy) F Romano (Italy) Augusto Virgili	3	4
(Turkey) E Kırkın (Germany) R Molleker	6	6
WC	(Greece) Ioannis Kountourakis (Greece) Stefanos Schinas	2	4
(Czech Republic) J Jermář (Ukraine) O Krutykh	2	6	[11]
2	(Bulgaria) A Donski (Spain) B Pujol Navarro	6	3	[9]

Quarterfinals
(Uzbekistan) K Sultanov (Ukraine) V Uzhylovskyi	5	5
(Bulgaria) A Genov (Poland) S Kielan	7	7
4	I Simakin (Canada) K Stevenson	7^{7}	6
(Serbia) S Latinović (Germany) M Topo	6^{2}	3
(Greece) S Sakellaridis (Greece) Pe Tsitsipas	6	6
Alt	(United States) A Jones (United States) M Jones	2	3
(Turkey) E Kırkın (Germany) R Molleker
(Czech Republic) J Jermář (Ukraine) O Krutykh	w/o

Semifinals
(Bulgaria) A Genov (Poland) S Kielan	3	4
4	I Simakin (Canada) K Stevenson	6	6
(Greece) S Sakellaridis (Greece) Pe Tsitsipas	4	7^{7}	[10]
(Czech Republic) J Jermář (Ukraine) O Krutykh	6	6^{4}	[7]

Final
4	I Simakin (Canada) K Stevenson	2	2
(Greece) S Sakellaridis (Greece) Pe Tsitsipas	6	6
