= 2025 Crete Challenger VI – Doubles =

Doubles
- 2025 Crete Challenger VI

Final
- Champions: (United Kingdom) Giles Hussey (United Kingdom) Mark Whitehouse
- Runners-up: (France) Geoffrey Blancaneaux (Belgium) Michael Geerts
- Score: 6–4, 4–6, [10–5]

Events
Singles	Doubles
- Crete Challenger

Alberto Barroso Campos and Iñaki Montes de la Torre were the defending champions but lost in the first round to Jarno Jans and Niels Visker.

Giles Hussey and Mark Whitehouse won the title after defeating Geoffrey Blancaneaux and Michael Geerts 6–4, 4–6, [10–5] in the final.

== Seeds ==
1. (France) Geoffrey Blancaneaux / (Belgium) Michael Geerts (final)
2. (Spain) Alberto Barroso Campos / (Spain) Iñaki Montes de la Torre (first round)
3. (Czech Republic) David Poljak / (France) Max Westphal (semifinals)
4. (Greece) Dimitris Sakellaridis / (South Africa) Kris van Wyk (first round)

== Draw ==
Key

- Q = Qualifier
- WC = Wild card
- LL = Lucky loser
- Alt = Alternate
- ITF = ITF entry
- PR = Protected ranking
- SR = Special ranking
- SE = Special exempt
- JE = Junior exempt
- JR = Junior Accelerator Programme entrant
- CO = College Accelerator Programme entrant
- NG = Next Gen Accelerator Program entrant
- w/o = Walkover
- r = Retired
- d = Defaulted

=== Draw ===
First round
1	(France) G Blancaneaux (Belgium) M Geerts	6	6
(Ivory Coast) E Coulibaly (France) A Escoffier	3	4
(Bulgaria) A Genov (Bulgaria) P Nesterov	4	3
WC	(Greece) S Sakellaridis (Greece) Pe Tsitsipas	6	6
3	(Czech Republic) D Poljak (France) M Westphal	6	3	[10]
(Portugal) Diogo Marques (Spain) Iván Marrero Curbelo	3	6	[3]
Alt	(Greece) Dimitris Azoidis (Greece) Michalis Sakellaridis	0	5
(United Kingdom) H Stewart (United Kingdom) H Wendelken	6	7
(United Kingdom) G Hussey (United Kingdom) M Whitehouse	6	6
Alt	(Italy) R Brancaccio (Spain) B Zapata Miralles	2	4
(Norway) L Hellum Lilleengen (India) K Singh	6	6
4	(Greece) D Sakellaridis (South Africa) Kris van Wyk	3	2
WC	(Cyprus) M Efstathiou (Cyprus) E Neos	4	7^{7}	[12]
(Spain) J Barranco Cosano (Spain) Imanol López Morillo	6	6^{2}	[14]
(Netherlands) J Jans (Netherlands) N Visker	6	6
2	(Spain) A Barroso Campos (Spain) I Montes de la Torre	2	4

Quarterfinals
1	(France) G Blancaneaux (Belgium) M Geerts	6	3	[10]
WC	(Greece) S Sakellaridis (Greece) Pe Tsitsipas	3	6	[8]
3	(Czech Republic) D Poljak (France) M Westphal	6	3	[12]
(United Kingdom) H Stewart (United Kingdom) H Wendelken	3	6	[10]
(United Kingdom) G Hussey (United Kingdom) M Whitehouse	1	7^{7}	[10]
(Norway) L Hellum Lilleengen (India) K Singh	6	6^{3}	[8]
(Spain) J Barranco Cosano (Spain) I López Morillo	3	6	[1]
(Netherlands) J Jans (Netherlands) N Visker	6	4	[10]

Semifinals
1	(France) G Blancaneaux (Belgium) M Geerts	7^{8}	7^{7}
3	(Czech Republic) D Poljak (France) M Westphal	6^{6}	6^{3}
(United Kingdom) G Hussey (United Kingdom) M Whitehouse	7^{7}	5	[10]
(Netherlands) J Jans (Netherlands) N Visker	6^{5}	7	[7]

Final
1	(France) G Blancaneaux (Belgium) M Geerts	4	6	[5]
(United Kingdom) G Hussey (United Kingdom) M Whitehouse	6	4	[10]
