= 2026 Crete Challenger – Singles =

Singles
- 2026 Crete Challenger

Final
- Champion: (United Kingdom) Toby Samuel
- Runner-up: (United Kingdom) Harry Wendelken
- Score: 6–3, 6–0

Events
Singles	Doubles
- Crete Challenger

Harry Wendelken was the defending champion but lost in the final to Toby Samuel.

Samuel won the title after defeating Wendelken 6–3, 6–0 in the final.

== Seeds ==
1. (Italy) Lorenzo Giustino (quarterfinals)
2. (Greece) Stefanos Sakellaridis (semifinals)
3. (Austria) Lukas Neumayer (quarterfinals)
4. (Spain) Alejandro Moro Cañas (first round)
5. (United Kingdom) Toby Samuel (champion)
6. (Germany) Tom Gentzsch (withdrew)
7. (Belgium) Kimmer Coppejans (withdrew)
8. (Bulgaria) Dimitar Kuzmanov (semifinals)

== Draw ==
Key

- Q = Qualifier
- WC = Wild card
- LL = Lucky loser
- Alt = Alternate
- ITF = ITF entry
- PR = Protected ranking
- SR = Special ranking
- SE = Special exempt
- JE = Junior exempt
- JR = Junior Accelerator Programme entrant
- CO = College Accelerator Programme entrant
- NG = Next Gen Accelerator Program entrant
- w/o = Walkover
- r = Retired
- d = Defaulted

=== Finals ===
Semifinals
8	(Bulgaria) Dimitar Kuzmanov	4	2
(United Kingdom) Harry Wendelken	6	6
5	(United Kingdom) Toby Samuel	6	6
2	(Greece) Stefanos Sakellaridis	2	0

Final
(United Kingdom) Harry Wendelken	3	0
5	(United Kingdom) Toby Samuel	6	6

=== Top half ===
First round
1	(Italy) L Giustino	6	6
Q	(Italy) Pietro Fellin	3	3
(South Africa) P Henning	3	6	2
Q	(Belgium) B Gadamauri	6	3	6
(France) R Bertrand	6	6
Q	(Colombia) A Soriano Barrera	0	2
Q	(Spain) J Barranco Cosano	3	2
8	(Bulgaria) D Kuzmanov	6	6
3	(Austria) L Neumayer	6	3
JR	(Italy) J Vasamì	1	0^{r}
(United States) A Rybakov	1	6	6
(Italy) J Berrettini	6	4	4
Q	(United Kingdom) L Maxted	6	1	3
(United Kingdom) H Wendelken	4	6	6
(Thailand) M Jones	3	2
LL	(United States) S Dostanic	6	6

Second round
1	(Italy) L Giustino	5	6	6
Q	(Belgium) B Gadamauri	7	4	3
(France) R Bertrand	2	5
8	(Bulgaria) D Kuzmanov	6	7
3	(Austria) L Neumayer	6	6
(United States) A Rybakov	4	4
(United Kingdom) H Wendelken	4	6	6
LL	(United States) S Dostanic	6	3	4

Quarterfinals
1	(Italy) L Giustino	1	1
8	(Bulgaria) D Kuzmanov	6	6
3	(Austria) L Neumayer	2	7^{7}	4
(United Kingdom) H Wendelken	6	6^{3}	6

Semifinals
8	(Bulgaria) D Kuzmanov	4	2
(United Kingdom) H Wendelken	6	6

=== Bottom half ===
First round
5	(United Kingdom) T Samuel	6	4	6
Alt	(Italy) R Brancaccio	3	6	3
(Spain) D Rincón	6	6
(Norway) V Durasovic	3	1
(Jordan) A Shelbayh	6	6
WC	(Greece) Pa Tsitsipas	4	2
WC	(Cyprus) M Efstathiou	6	3	6
4	(Spain) A Moro Cañas	4	6	3
LL	(Italy) G Piraino	2	4
WC	(Greece) Ioannis Xilas	6	6
LL	Svyatoslav Gulin	6	6^{6}	1
(Czech Republic) M Mrva	4	7^{8}	6
(Belgium) M Geerts	6	6
(Portugal) T Pereira	4	4
Q	(Italy) Lorenzo Carboni	6	5	1^{r}
2	(Greece) S Sakellaridis	4	7	3

Second round
5	(United Kingdom) T Samuel	7^{7}	6
(Spain) D Rincón	6^{2}	4
(Jordan) A Shelbayh	1	6	6
WC	(Cyprus) M Efstathiou	6	2	2
WC	(Greece) I Xilas	6	6
(Czech Republic) M Mrva	3	3
(Belgium) M Geerts	3	2
2	(Greece) S Sakellaridis	6	6

Quarterfinals
5	(United Kingdom) T Samuel	6	6
(Jordan) A Shelbayh	4	3
WC	(Greece) I Xilas	6	3	2
2	(Greece) S Sakellaridis	4	6	6

Semifinals
5	(United Kingdom) T Samuel	6	6
2	(Greece) S Sakellaridis	2	0
