= 2025 Crete Challenger VI =

- Date: 13 – 19 October
- Edition: 6th
- Surface: Hard
- Location: Hersonissos, Greece

Champions

Singles
- (United Kingdom) Harry Wendelken

Doubles
- (United Kingdom) Giles Hussey / (United Kingdom) Mark Whitehouse
- Crete Challenger

The 2025 Iconico Crete Challenger VI was a professional tennis tournament played on hardcourts. It was the sixth edition of the tournament which was part of the 2025 ATP Challenger Tour. It took place in Hersonissos, Greece between 13 and 19 October 2025.

== Singles main-draw entrants ==
=== Seeds ===
Country	Player	Rank^{1}	Seed
GBR	Oliver Crawford	185	1
GBR	Ryan Peniston	224	2
FRA	Geoffrey Blancaneaux	257	3
BUL	Dimitar Kuzmanov	261	4
CIV	Eliakim Coulibaly	305	5
GRE	Stefanos Sakellaridis	306	6
FRA	Robin Bertrand	317	7
BEL	Michael Geerts	322	8

- ^{1} Rankings are as of 29 September 2025.

=== Other entrants ===
The following players received wildcards into the singles main draw:

- (Greece) Stefanos Sakellaridis
- (Greece) Petros Tsitsipas
- (Greece) Ioannis Xilas

The following players received entry into the singles main draw using protected rankings:

- (Bulgaria) Adrian Andreev
- (Germany) Cedrik-Marcel Stebe

The following player received entry into the singles main draw through the Junior Accelerator programme:

- (Romania) Luca Preda

The following player received entry into the singles main draw through the Next Gen Accelerator programme:

- (Czech Republic) Maxim Mrva

The following players received entry from the qualifying draw:

- (Moldova) Radu Albot
- (United Kingdom) Max Basing
- (United States) Dali Blanch
- (United Kingdom) Charles Broom
- (Czech Republic) Petr Brunclík
- (India) Karan Singh

The following player received entry as a lucky loser:

- (United Kingdom) Harry Wendelken

== Champions ==
=== Singles ===
- (United Kingdom) Harry Wendelken def. (Czech Republic) Maxim Mrva 6–4, 6–3.

=== Doubles ===
- (United Kingdom) Giles Hussey / (United Kingdom) Mark Whitehouse def. (France) Geoffrey Blancaneaux / (Belgium) Michael Geerts 6–4, 4–6, [10–5].
