= 2025 Crete Challenger II – Singles =

Singles
- 2025 Crete Challenger II

Final
- Champion: (Bulgaria) Dimitar Kuzmanov
- Runner-up: (Italy) Federico Cinà
- Score: 6–4, 6–2

Events
Singles	Doubles
- Crete Challenger

Edas Butvilas was the defending champion but chose not to defend his title.

Dimitar Kuzmanov won the title after defeating Federico Cinà 6–4, 6–2 in the final.

== Seeds ==
1. (Kazakhstan) Timofey Skatov (quarterfinals)
2. Aslan Karatsev (semifinals)
3. (Uzbekistan) Khumoyun Sultanov (second round)
4. (Chinese Taipei) Wu Tung-lin (second round)
5. (Czech Republic) Marek Gengel (second round, retired)
6. (Luxembourg) Chris Rodesch (quarterfinals)
7. (Hungary) Zsombor Piros (withdrew)
8. (Italy) Lorenzo Giustino (first round)
9. (Germany) Rudolf Molleker (first round, retired)

== Draw ==
Key

- Q = Qualifier
- WC = Wild card
- LL = Lucky loser
- Alt = Alternate
- ITF = ITF entry
- PR = Protected ranking
- SR = Special ranking
- SE = Special exempt
- JE = Junior exempt
- JR = Junior Accelerator Programme entrant
- CO = College Accelerator Programme entrant
- NG = Next Gen Accelerator Program entrant
- w/o = Walkover
- r = Retired
- d = Defaulted

=== Finals ===
Semifinals
(Bulgaria) Dimitar Kuzmanov	6	7
(Germany) Christoph Negritu	3	5
WC	(Italy) Federico Cinà	6	6
2	Aslan Karatsev	4	2

Final
(Bulgaria) Dimitar Kuzmanov	6	6
WC	(Italy) Federico Cinà	4	2

=== Top half ===
First round
1	(Kazakhstan) T Skatov	7^{7}	6
Q	(United States) K Smith	6^{2}	3
(Slovakia) M Kližan	4	2
Q	(United Kingdom) R Peniston	6	6
(Bulgaria) D Kuzmanov	6	6
(France) A Géa	3	3
Alt	(Italy) G Fonio	6	4
9	(Germany) R Molleker	4	0^{r}
4	(Chinese Taipei) T-l Wu	4	6	6
SE	(United Kingdom) S Parker	6	2	4
(Bolivia) JC Prado Ángelo	1	1
(Austria) D Novak	6	6
WC	(Greece) S Sakellaridis	7	6
(Spain) N Sánchez Izquierdo	5	3
(Germany) C Negritu	4	6	6
8	(Italy) L Giustino	6	4	2

Second round
1	(Kazakhstan) T Skatov	6	6
Q	(United Kingdom) R Peniston	4	4
(Bulgaria) D Kuzmanov	2	6	6
Alt	(Italy) G Fonio	6	3	4
4	(Chinese Taipei) T-l Wu	5	4
(Austria) D Novak	7	6
WC	(Greece) S Sakellaridis	5	4
(Germany) C Negritu	7	6

Quarterfinals
1	(Kazakhstan) T Skatov	4	3
(Bulgaria) D Kuzmanov	6	6
(Austria) D Novak	3	7^{7}	5
(Germany) C Negritu	6	6^{3}	7

Semifinals
(Bulgaria) D Kuzmanov	6	7
(Germany) C Negritu	3	5

=== Bottom half ===
First round
5	(Czech Republic) M Gengel	7^{7}	6^{3}	6
(Germany) M Rosenkranz	6^{4}	7^{7}	4
(Turkey) E Kırkın	7^{11}	7
(United States) Andre Ilagan	6^{9}	5
WC	(Italy) F Cinà	7	7^{7}
Alt	(Australia) Matthew Dellavedova	5	6^{5}
(Lithuania) R Berankis	2	2
3	(Uzbekistan) K Sultanov	6	6
6	(Luxembourg) C Rodesch	7	6
Q	(Italy) Marcello Serafini	5	4
Q	(Ukraine) O Krutykh	3	1
Q	(Thailand) K Samrej	6	6
WC	(Greece) Pa Tsitsipas	1	2
(Colombia) A Soriano Barrera	6	6
Q	(Germany) M Topo	3	4
2	A Karatsev	6	6

Second round
5	(Czech Republic) M Gengel	6^{1}	2^{r}
(Turkey) E Kırkın	7^{7}	5
WC	(Italy) F Cinà	7^{7}	6
3	(Uzbekistan) K Sultanov	6^{3}	0
6	(Luxembourg) C Rodesch	6	2
Q	(Thailand) K Samrej	1	1^{r}
(Colombia) A Soriano Barrera	3	3
2	A Karatsev	6	6

Quarterfinals
(Turkey) E Kırkın	5	4
WC	(Italy) F Cinà	7	6
6	(Luxembourg) C Rodesch	2	5
2	A Karatsev	6	7

Semifinals
WC	(Italy) F Cinà	6	6
2	A Karatsev	4	2
