= 2025 Crete Challenger III =

- Date: 11 – 16 August
- Edition: 3rd
- Surface: Hard
- Location: Hersonissos, Greece

Champions

Singles
- (Spain) Rafael Jódar

Doubles
- (Italy) Filippo Moroni / (United Kingdom) Stuart Parker
- Crete Challenger

The 2025 Crete Challenger III was a professional tennis tournament played on hard courts. It was the third edition of the tournament which was part of the 2025 ATP Challenger Tour. It took place in Hersonissos, Greece between 11 and 16 August 2025.

== Singles main-draw entrants ==
=== Seeds ===
Country	Player	Rank^{1}	Seed
GBR	George Loffhagen	229	1
CZE	Marek Gengel	250	2
FRA	Matteo Martineau	269	3
CHN	Cui Jie	298	4
GRE	Stefanos Sakellaridis	317	5
FRA	Dan Added	340	6
USA	Christian Langmo	351	7
~~JOR~~	~~Abdullah Shelbayh~~	~~353~~	~~8~~

- ^{1} Rankings are as of 4 August 2025.

=== Other entrants ===
The following players received wildcards into the singles main draw:

- (Greece) Pavlos Tsitsipas
- (Greece) Petros Tsitsipas
- (Greece) Ioannis Xilas

The following player received entry into the singles main draw using a protected ranking:

- (Jamaica) Blaise Bicknell

The following player received entry into the singles main draw as an alternate:

- (Spain) Rafael Jódar

The following players received entry from the qualifying draw:

- (Italy) Luca Castagnola
- (Italy) Pietro Fellin
- Ilya Ivashka
- (Israel) Orel Kimhi
- (Hungary) Péter Makk
- (France) Théo Papamalamis

The following player received entry as a lucky loser:

- (Italy) Filippo Moroni

== Champions ==
=== Singles ===
- (Spain) Rafael Jódar def. (France) Dan Added 6–4, 6–2.

=== Doubles ===
- (Italy) Filippo Moroni / (United Kingdom) Stuart Parker def. (France) Dan Added / (France) Arthur Reymond 6–4, 6–4.
