= 2025 Crete Challenger VI – Singles =

Singles
- 2025 Crete Challenger VI

Final
- Champion: (United Kingdom) Harry Wendelken
- Runner-up: (Czech Republic) Maxim Mrva
- Score: 6–4, 6–3

Events
Singles	Doubles
- Crete Challenger

Ryan Peniston was the defending champion but lost in the second round to Fabrizio Andaloro.

Harry Wendelken won the title after defeating Maxim Mrva 6–4, 6–3 in the final.

== Seeds ==
1. (United Kingdom) Oliver Crawford (first round)
2. (United Kingdom) Ryan Peniston (second round)
3. (France) Geoffrey Blancaneaux (first round, retired)
4. (Bulgaria) Dimitar Kuzmanov (semifinals)
5. (Ivory Coast) Eliakim Coulibaly (second round)
6. (Greece) Stefanos Sakellaridis (second round)
7. (France) Robin Bertrand (first round)
8. (Belgium) Michael Geerts (first round)

== Draw ==
Key

- Q = Qualifier
- WC = Wild card
- LL = Lucky loser
- Alt = Alternate
- ITF = ITF entry
- PR = Protected ranking
- SR = Special ranking
- SE = Special exempt
- JE = Junior exempt
- JR = Junior Accelerator Programme entrant
- CO = College Accelerator Programme entrant
- NG = Next Gen Accelerator Program entrant
- w/o = Walkover
- r = Retired
- d = Defaulted

=== Finals ===
Semifinals
NG	(Czech Republic) Maxim Mrva	6	2	6
4	(Bulgaria) Dimitar Kuzmanov	2	6	2
(Spain) Iñaki Montes de la Torre	2	4
LL	(United Kingdom) Harry Wendelken	6	6

Final
NG	(Czech Republic) Maxim Mrva	4	3
LL	(United Kingdom) Harry Wendelken	6	6

=== Top half ===
First round
1	(United Kingdom) O Crawford	6^{5}	5
JR	(Romania) L Preda	7^{7}	7
(United Kingdom) G Hussey	6	2	6
Q	(Czech Republic) Petr Brunclík	4	6	3
NG	(Czech Republic) M Mrva	7	7^{7}
(France) A Escoffier	5	6^{4}
Q	(India) K Singh	6	4	3
6/WC	(Greece) S Sakellaridis	3	6	6
4	(Bulgaria) D Kuzmanov	6	6
Q	(United States) Dali Blanch	4	1
(Spain) J Barranco Cosano	6	2	3
Q	(United Kingdom) C Broom	4	6	6
WC	(Greece) Pe Tsitsipas	3	1
Q	(Moldova) R Albot	6	6
PR	(Bulgaria) A Andreev	6^{5}	3
5	(Ivory Coast) E Coulibaly	7^{7}	6

Second round
JR	(Romania) L Preda	2	6	3
(United Kingdom) G Hussey	6	4	6
NG	(Czech Republic) M Mrva	7	4	6
6/WC	(Greece) S Sakellaridis	5	6	2
4	(Bulgaria) D Kuzmanov	6	6
Q	(United Kingdom) C Broom	3	1
Q	(Moldova) R Albot	6	6
5	(Ivory Coast) E Coulibaly	2	4

Quarterfinals
(United Kingdom) G Hussey	1	3
NG	(Czech Republic) M Mrva	6	6
4	(Bulgaria) D Kuzmanov	6	7
Q	(Moldova) R Albot	2	5

Semifinals
NG	(Czech Republic) M Mrva	6	2	6
4	(Bulgaria) D Kuzmanov	2	6	2

=== Bottom half ===
First round
7	(France) R Bertrand	2	6^{3}
(Spain) I Montes de la Torre	6	7^{7}
(Spain) M Alcalá Gurri	1	2
WC	(Greece) Ioannis Xilas	6	6
Q	(United Kingdom) M Basing	6	6
(Italy) R Brancaccio	4	3
(United Kingdom) H Stewart	6	3
3	(France) G Blancaneaux	2	0^{r}
8	(Belgium) M Geerts	3	7^{8}	6^{6}
LL	(United Kingdom) H Wendelken	6	6^{6}	7^{8}
(Spain) B Zapata Miralles	3	3
(Austria) D Novak	6	6
(Italy) J Berrettini	4	3
(Italy) Fabrizio Andaloro	6	6
PR	(Germany) C-M Stebe	3	7	4
2	(United Kingdom) R Peniston	6	5	6

Second round
(Spain) I Montes de la Torre	6	1	6
WC	(Greece) I Xilas	3	6	1
Q	(United Kingdom) M Basing	7^{8}	6
(United Kingdom) H Stewart	6^{6}	1
LL	(United Kingdom) H Wendelken	6	3	6
(Austria) D Novak	2	6	1
(Italy) F Andaloro	7	7^{7}
2	(United Kingdom) R Peniston	5	6^{2}

Quarterfinals
(Spain) I Montes de la Torre	6	6
Q	(United Kingdom) M Basing	4	1
LL	(United Kingdom) H Wendelken	6	6
(Italy) F Andaloro	2	0

Semifinals
(Spain) I Montes de la Torre	2	4
LL	(United Kingdom) H Wendelken	6	6
