= 2026 Crete Challenger =

- Date: 2 – 8 March
- Edition: 7th
- Surface: Hard
- Location: Hersonissos, Greece

Champions

Singles
- (United Kingdom) Toby Samuel

Doubles
- (Italy) Jacopo Berrettini / (Belgium) Kimmer Coppejans
- Crete Challenger

The 2026 Crete Challenger was a professional tennis tournament played on hardcourts. It was the seventh edition of the tournament which was part of the 2026 ATP Challenger Tour. It took place in Hersonissos, Greece between 2 and 8 March 2026.

== Singles main-draw entrants ==
=== Seeds ===
| Country | Player | Rank^{1} | Seed |
|---|---|---|---|
| ITA | Lorenzo Giustino | 207 | 1 |
| GRE | Stefanos Sakellaridis | 220 | 2 |
| AUT | Lukas Neumayer | 227 | 3 |
| ESP | Alejandro Moro Cañas | 245 | 4 |
| GBR | Toby Samuel | 246 | 5 |
| ~~GER~~ | ~~Tom Gentzsch~~ | ~~247~~ | ~~6~~ |
| ~~BEL~~ | ~~Kimmer Coppejans~~ | ~~252~~ | ~~7~~ |
| BUL | Dimitar Kuzmanov | 265 | 8 |

- ^{1} Rankings are as of 23 February 2026.

=== Other entrants ===
The following players received wildcards into the singles main draw:

- (Cyprus) Menelaos Efstathiou
- (Greece) Pavlos Tsitsipas
- (Greece) Ioannis Xilas

The following player received entry into the singles main draw through the Junior Accelerator programme:

- (Italy) Jacopo Vasamì

The following player received entry into the singles main draw as an alternate:

- (Italy) Raúl Brancaccio

The following players received entry from the qualifying draw:

- (Spain) Javier Barranco Cosano
- (Italy) Lorenzo Carboni
- (Italy) Pietro Fellin
- (Belgium) Buvaysar Gadamauri
- (United Kingdom) Lui Maxted
- (Colombia) Adrià Soriano Barrera

The following players received entry as lucky losers:

- (United States) Stefan Dostanic
- Svyatoslav Gulin
- (Italy) Gabriele Piraino

== Champions ==
=== Singles ===
- (United Kingdom) Toby Samuel def. (United Kingdom) Harry Wendelken 6–3, 6–0.

=== Doubles ===
- (Italy) Jacopo Berrettini / (Belgium) Kimmer Coppejans def. (United Kingdom) Finn Bass / (Bulgaria) Anthony Genov 3–6, 6–1, [10–3].
