= Tennis at the 2023 Island Games =

- Venue: Guernsey Tennis Centre, Guernsey
- Dates: 8–14 July
- Competitors: 44 men and 29 women from 12 nations

Tennis at the 2023 Island Games was held at the Guernsey Tennis Centre in Guernsey in July 2023.

== Medal table ==
* Host nation (Guernsey)

Rank	Nation	Gold	Silver	Bronze	Total
1	Jersey	3	1	3	7
2	Guernsey*	2	1	1	4
3	Menorca	1	2	0	3
4	Isle of Man	1	1	3	5
5	Åland	0	1	2	3
6	Gotland	0	1	1	2
7	Bermuda	0	0	3	3
8	Cayman Islands	0	0	1	1
Totals (8 entries)		7	7	14	28

== Participating islands ==
- Åland Islands
- Alderney
- Bermuda
- Cayman Islands
- Faroe Islands
- Gibraltar
- Gotland
- Guernsey (Host)
- Isle of Man
- Isle of Wight
- Jersey
- Menorca

== Results ==
Event	Gold	Silver	Bronze
Men's singles	Stuart Parker; Jersey	Oscar Mesquida Berg; Menorca	Filip Devallius; Gotland
Men's singles	Stuart Parker; Jersey	Oscar Mesquida Berg; Menorca	Zacharias Forsström; Åland
Women's singles	Lauren Watson-Steele; Guernsey	Natasha Forrest; Jersey	Anna Kirk; Isle of Man
Women's singles	Lauren Watson-Steele; Guernsey	Natasha Forrest; Jersey	Shelby Madeiros; Bermuda
Men's doubles	Menorca; Alex Mesquida Berg; Oscar Mesquida Berg	Åland Islands; Zacharias Forsström; Nathan Schulz	Bermuda; James Finnigan; Gavin Manders
Men's doubles	Menorca; Alex Mesquida Berg; Oscar Mesquida Berg	Åland Islands; Zacharias Forsström; Nathan Schulz	Jersey; Stuart Parker; Scott Weaver
Women's doubles	Guernsey; Lauren Barker; Lauren Watson-Steele	Isle of Man; Karen Faragher; Sarah Long	Jersey; Eva Hurst; Sonia Smith
Women's doubles	Guernsey; Lauren Barker; Lauren Watson-Steele	Isle of Man; Karen Faragher; Sarah Long	Jersey; Natasha Forrest; Antonija Sokić
Mixed doubles	Isle of Man; Sean Drewry; Anna Kirk	Guernsey; Joanna Dyer; Robert West	Isle of Man; Marc Chinn; Karen Faragher
Mixed doubles	Isle of Man; Sean Drewry; Anna Kirk	Guernsey; Joanna Dyer; Robert West	Cayman Islands; Abigail Anderson; Ricardo Solon
Men's team	Jersey; Adam Bayley; Robert Hannah; Louis Keenan; Stuart Parker; Scott Weaver	Menorca; Alex Mesquida Berg; Oscar Mesquida Berg	Åland Islands; Otto Byman; Zacharias Forsström; Melker Rumander; Olle Rumander; Nathan Schulz
Men's team	Jersey; Adam Bayley; Robert Hannah; Louis Keenan; Stuart Parker; Scott Weaver	Menorca; Alex Mesquida Berg; Oscar Mesquida Berg	Bermuda; James Finnigan; Gavin Manders; Scott Redmond; David Thomas; Christopher Weeks
Women's team	Jersey; Natasha Forrest; Emily Frost; Eva Hurst; Sonia Smith; Antonija Sokić	Gotland; Tzvetelina Havrén; Melliz Petkova-Mustafa	Isle of Man; Karen Faragher; Aailish Kelly; Anna Kirk; Sarah Long; Elena Snidal
Women's team	Jersey; Natasha Forrest; Emily Frost; Eva Hurst; Sonia Smith; Antonija Sokić	Gotland; Tzvetelina Havrén; Melliz Petkova-Mustafa	Guernsey; Lauren Barker; Joanna Dyer; Lauren Watson-Steele
