= 2023 Nonthaburi Challenger III – Doubles =

Doubles
- 2023 Nonthaburi Challenger III

Final
- Champions: (South Korea) Nam Ji-sung (South Korea) Song Min-kyu
- Runners-up: (United Kingdom) Jan Choinski (United Kingdom) Stuart Parker
- Score: 6–4, 6–4

Events
Singles	Doubles
- Nonthaburi Challenger

Yuki Bhambri and Saketh Myneni were the defending champions but chose not to defend their title.

Nam Ji-sung and Song Min-kyu won the title after defeating Jan Choinski and Stuart Parker 6–4, 6–4 in the final.

== Seeds ==
1. (South Korea) Nam Ji-sung / (South Korea) Song Min-kyu (champions)
2. (Japan) Toshihide Matsui / (Japan) Kaito Uesugi (first round)
3. (India) Anirudh Chandrasekar / (India) Vijay Sundar Prashanth (semifinals)
4. (France) Luca Sanchez / (Canada) Kelsey Stevenson (quarterfinals)

== Draw ==
Key

- Q = Qualifier
- WC = Wild card
- LL = Lucky loser
- Alt = Alternate
- ITF = ITF entry
- PR = Protected ranking
- SR = Special ranking
- SE = Special exempt
- JE = Junior exempt
- JR = Junior Accelerator Programme entrant
- CO = College Accelerator Programme entrant
- NG = Next Gen Accelerator Program entrant
- w/o = Walkover
- r = Retired
- d = Defaulted

First round
1	(South Korea) J-s Nam (South Korea) M-k Song	6	7^{7}
(Philippines) FC Alcantara (Japan) H Moriya	4	6^{0}
(Italy) G Oradini (United States) K Smith
E Donskoy (Kazakhstan) D Yevseyev	w/o
4	(France) L Sanchez (Canada) K Stevenson	7^{7}	6
(Ukraine) O Ovcharenko (Italy) S Travaglia	6^{3}	1
Alt	(Thailand) P Kovapitukted (Japan) Makoto Ochi	3	4
(Romania) ND Ionel (Poland) K Żuk	6	6
WC	(Thailand) P Isaro (Thailand) T Suksumrarn	7^{7}	6^{4}	[8]
(Chinese Taipei) J Jung (United States) E King	6^{4}	7^{7}	[10]
WC	(Thailand) Krittin Koaykul (Thailand) J Navasirisomboon	3	2
3	(India) A Chandrasekar (India) VS Prashanth	6	6
(South Korea) S-c Hong (Japan) S Shimabukuro	3	6	[4]
Alt	(Belgium) M Geerts (Ukraine) V Orlov	6	2	[10]
Alt	(United Kingdom) J Choinski (United Kingdom) S Parker	6	6
2	(Japan) T Matsui (Japan) K Uesugi	3	3

Quarterfinals
1	(South Korea) J-s Nam (South Korea) M-k Song	w/o
E Donskoy (Kazakhstan) D Yevseyev
4	(France) L Sanchez (Canada) K Stevenson	4	3
(Romania) ND Ionel (Poland) K Żuk	6	6
(Chinese Taipei) J Jung (United States) E King	6	6^{5}	[8]
3	(India) A Chandrasekar (India) VS Prashanth	4	7^{7}	[10]
Alt	(Belgium) M Geerts (Ukraine) V Orlov	3	2
Alt	(United Kingdom) J Choinski (United Kingdom) S Parker	6	6

Semifinals
1	(South Korea) J-s Nam (South Korea) M-k Song	7	7^{7}
(Romania) ND Ionel (Poland) K Żuk	5	6^{3}
3	(India) A Chandrasekar (India) VS Prashanth	5	3
Alt	(United Kingdom) J Choinski (United Kingdom) S Parker	7	6

Final
1	(South Korea) J-s Nam (South Korea) M-k Song	6	6
Alt	(United Kingdom) J Choinski (United Kingdom) S Parker	4	4
