= Toby Samuel =

British tennis player (born 2002)

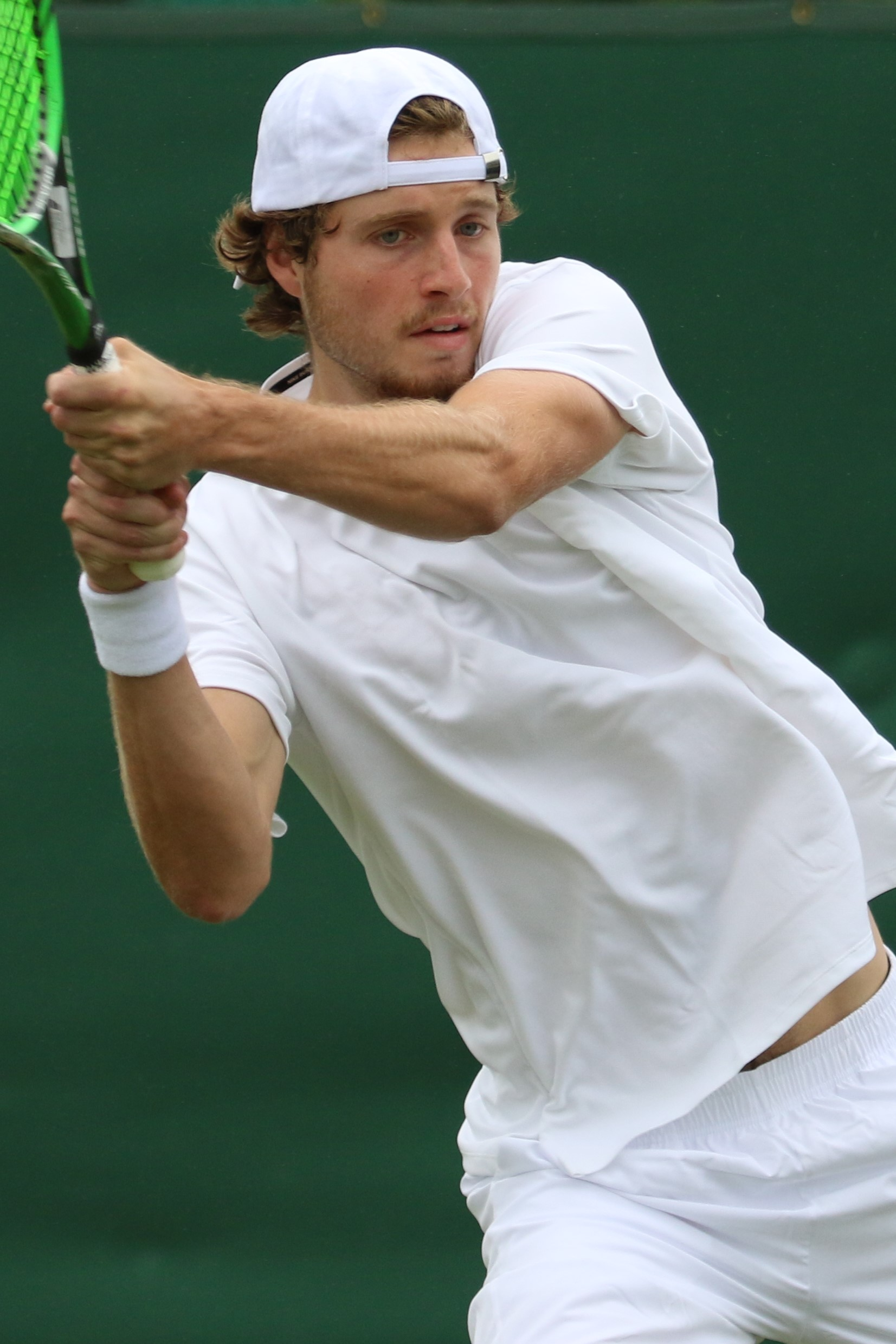
- Samuel at the 2023 Wimbledon Championships
- Country (sports): (United Kingdom) Great Britain
- Residence: Bath, Somerset, England
- Born: 6 September 2002 (age 24) Winchester, Hampshire, England
- Height: 1.91 m (6 ft 3 in)
- Plays: Right-handed (two-handed backhand)
- College: South Carolina
- Coach: Josh Goffi
- Prize money: US $683,724

Singles
- Career record: 5–7
- Career titles: 0
- Highest ranking: No. 92 (16 November 2026)
- Current ranking: No. 92 (16 November 2026)

Grand Slam singles results
- French Open: 1R (2026)
- Wimbledon: 1R (2026)
- US Open: 2R (2026)

Doubles
- Career record: 1–1
- Career titles: 0
- Highest ranking: No. 242 (20 May 2024)

Grand Slam doubles results
- Wimbledon: 2R (2023)
Medal record
Representing Great Britain
World University Games
Silver medal – second place	2025 Rhine-Ruhr	Singles
- Last updated on: 16 November 2026.

Toby Samuel (born 6 September 2002) is an English professional tennis player. He has a career-high ATP singles ranking of No. 92 achieved on 16 November 2026 and a doubles ranking of No. 242 achieved on 20 May 2025. He is the current British No. 4 in singles.

== Early life ==
Samuel was born in Winchester and raised in St Leonards, Dorset. He attended Castle Court Prep School and Bournemouth Collegiate School. He developed his tennis at West Hants Club, where he trained regularly with fellow Bournemouth Collegiate pupil Jack Pinnington Jones.

== College ==
Samuel studied sports management at the University of South Carolina. Alongside partner Connor Thomson he won the All American Doubles title, with the pair becoming the number one ranked doubles team in collegiate tennis.

== Career ==
=== 2019–2020: Juniors ===
Samuel reached the semifinals of the Boys' doubles at the 2019 Wimbledon Championships alongside compatriot Arthur Fery. He peaked at world No. 56 in the ITF junior rankings on 27 January 2020.

=== 2023–2024: Turned pro, Major doubles debut ===
In June 2023, Samuel received a wildcard with his partner Connor Thomson for the Men's doubles at the 2023 Surbiton Trophy and the pair beat the second seeds Andre Goransson and Ben McLachlan in straight sets before losing to eventual finalists Alexei Popyrin and Aleksandar Vukic in the quarterfinals. Samuel and Thomson reached the semifinals of the 2023 Nottingham Open. He and Thomson were subsequently awarded wildcards into the 2023 Wimbledon Championships. They won their opening match against Pedro Cachin and Yannick Hanfmann. In the second round their run ended with a 6-3, 7-6 defeat to experienced pair of Santiago González of Mexico and Edouard Roger-Vasselin of France. At the 2023 Calgary National Bank Challenger he secured his third win at that level with victory over Ryan Seggerman.

In 2024, Samuel received six main-draw spots in Challenger events as part of the ATP Accelerator Programme but suffered an arm injury which limited his availability.

=== 2025: Maiden Challenger title, Top 300 ===
In May, he recorded a win over Radu Albot on his way to the semifinals of the ATP Challenger event, the 2025 Moldova Open, and went on a run where he lost just five of 48 matches. He won the silver medal in the men's singles at the 2025 Summer World University Games in Germany, and also won a silver medal in the team competition at the Games.

In November, Samuel won his first Challenger singles title at the Soma Bay Open, defeating Jay Clarke in the final. The following week he made it back-to-back titles, overcoming Ilia Simakin in the final to claim the trophy at the Manama Challenger in Bahrain, leading up to a run of 18 consecutive wins. As a result he reached a new career high singles ranking of No. 267 on 1 December 2025.

=== 2026: Major & top 100 debuts in singles, ATP wins & semifinal ===
Samuel went on another winning streak from February 2026, including one Futures and two Challenger titles back-to-back titles in Greece, and improved his ranking to a career high No. 171 on 16 March 2026.

At the 2026 French Open Samuel qualified for the main draw, making his Grand Slam debut, after defeating former top-10 player David Goffin and Gonzalo Bueno. In doing so, he became only the fourth British man in 50 years to come through qualifying at Roland Garros. He was defeated in straight sets by eight seed Alex De Minaur in the opening round.

He received a main draw wildcard for the 2026 Queen's Club Championships, but lost to compatriot Arthur Fery. He also entered the main draw of the 2026 Eastbourne Open directly into the second round as a lucky loser, receiving a first-round bye, replacing Queen's Club champion Francisco Cerundolo. He recorded his first ATP wins over Argentines Thiago Agustín Tirante and eight seed Juan Manuel Cerundolo, his first top-50 win, to reach his first ATP semifinal. He fell to eventual champion Zizou Bergs but despite the loss he reached the top 125 in the ATP singles rankings at a career-high of No. 123 on 29 June 2026. He received a main draw wildcard for the 2026 Wimbledon Championships making his singles debut at his home Grand Slam event against world number fifteen Jakub Mensik in the first round, only losing on a fifth set tie-break. In August, he came through three rounds of qualifiers to reach the main draw at the 2026 US Open, before winning against Tomas Machac in straight sets for the loss of only seven games for his first grand slam singles match victory.

On 19 September, Samuel won on his Davis Cup debut for Great Britain, winning in three sets against Ecuador's Andy Andrade, part of a 4-0 win as Great Britain secured a place at the 2026 Davis Cup Finals.

== Personal life ==
Samuel is currently based in Bath and trains at the University of Bath as part of Team Bath Tennis. A keen football fan, he is a supporter of Southampton.

== ATP Challenger Tour finals ==
=== Singles: 5 (5 titles) ===
Legend ATP Challenger Tour (5–0)	Finals by surface Hard (5–0) Clay (–)

Result	W–L	Date	Tournament	Tier	Surface	Opponent	Score
Win	1–0	Nov 2025	Soma Bay Open, Egypt	Challenger	Hard	(United Kingdom) Jay Clarke	4–6, 7–6^{(7–4)}, 6–0
Win	2–0	Nov 2025	Manama Challenger, Bahrain	Challenger	Hard	Ilia Simakin	6–0, 6–2
Win	3–0	Mar 2026	Crete Challenger, Greece	Challenger	Hard	(United Kingdom) Harry Wendelken	6–3, 6–0
Win	4–0	Mar 2026	Crete Challenger II, Greece	Challenger	Hard	(Czech Republic) Maxim Mrva	6–2, 6–3
Win	5–0	Jul 2026	Winnipeg Challenger, Canada	Challenger	Hard	(Canada) Liam Draxl	6–4, 6–2

=== Doubles: 1 (title) ===
Legend ATP Challenger Tour (1–0)

Result	W–L	Date	Tournament	Tier	Surface	Partner	Opponents	Score
Win	1–0	Nov 2023	Challenger de Drummondville, Canada	Challenger	Hard (i)	(Sweden) André Göransson	(Canada) Liam Draxl (United Kingdom) Giles Hussey	6–7^{(2–7)}, 6–3, [10–8]

== ITF World Tennis Tour finals ==
=== Singles: 11 (8 titles, 3 runner-ups) ===
Legend ITF WTT (8–3)	Finals by surface Hard (6–3) Clay (–) Grass (2–0)

Result	W–L	Date	Tournament	Tier	Surface	Opponent	Score
Win	1–0	Jul 2022	M25 Roehampton, UK	WTT	Grass	(United Kingdom) Henry Patten	6–4, 6–7^{(8–10)}, 6–4
Win	2–0	Nov 2022	M15 Fayetteville, US	WTT	Hard	(United States) Learner Tien	6–3, 6–3
Win	3–0	Nov 2022	M15 Winston-Salem, US	WTT	Hard	(United States) Alex Michelsen	6–1, 7–5
Win	4–0	Jul 2023	M25 Nottingham, UK	WTT	Grass	(United Kingdom) Billy Harris	6–4, 6–4
Loss	4–1	Aug 2023	M25 Aldershot, UK	WTT	Hard	(United Kingdom) Arthur Fery	4–6, 4–6
Loss	4–2	Aug 2025	M25 Aldershot, UK	WTT	Hard	(United Kingdom) Paul Jubb	6–7^{(4–7)}, 5–7
Win	5–2	Sep 2025	M15 Hurghada, Egypt	WTT	Hard	(Hungary) Péter Makk	7–6^{(7–4)}, 6–1
Win	6–2	Sep 2025	M15 Hurghada, Egypt	WTT	Hard	(United Kingdom) Liam Broady	6–1, 6–2
Loss	6–3	Nov 2025	M15 Marsa, Malta	WTT	Hard	(France) Arthur Nagel	4–6, 5–7
Win	7–3	Nov 2025	M15 Sharm El Sheikh, Egypt	WTT	Hard	(Slovakia) Michal Krajčí	6–2, 6–4
Win	8–3	Mar 2026	M25 Vale Do Lobo, Portugal	WTT	Hard	(United Kingdom) Giles Hussey	6–3, 6–4

=== Doubles: 1 (title) ===
Legend ITF WTT (1–0)

Result	W–L	Date	Tournament	Tier	Surface	Partner	Opponents	Score
Win	1–0	Nov 2022	M15 Winston-Salem, US	WTT	Hard	(United Kingdom) Ben Jones	(France) Robin Catry (Switzerland) Luca Staeheli	6–3, 6–1
