= Giles Hussey (tennis) =

British tennis player (born 1997)

- Country (sports): Great Britain
- Born: 26 May 1997 (age 29) Swindon, England
- Height: 1.85 m (6 ft 1 in)
- Plays: Left-handed, two-handed backhand
- College: University of Tennessee
- Prize money: US $191,297

Singles
- Career record: 2–2
- Highest ranking: No. 253 (27 July 2026)
- Current ranking: No. 327 (9 November 2026)

Grand Slam singles results
- Wimbledon: Q1 (2025)

Doubles
- Career record: 0–0
- Highest ranking: No. 213 (29 May 2023)
- Current ranking: No. 464 (9 November 2026)
- Last updated on: 9 November 2026.

Giles Hussey (born 26 May 1997) is a British tennis player. He has a career-high ATP singles ranking of world No. 253 achieved on 27 July 2026 and a best doubles ranking of No. 213 achieved in May 2023.

Hussey played college tennis at the University of Tennessee.

== Personal life ==
Hussey attended Millfield public school. He began to be based in Bath, Somerset in September 2021.

== Career ==
=== 2021-2023: Pro beginnings ===
Hussey won his first professional tournament in October 2021 in Cancun on the ITF World Tennis Tour.

In August 2022, Hussey reached the final of an ITF event singled in Roehampton, before losing 6–4, 6–4 to France's Antoine Hoang. At the same event he teamed up with Joe Tyler to beat the second seeds, Arthur Fery and Mark Whitehouse 7–6(2), 6–1 in the men's doubles final. In October 2022, he lost to Fery in the final of the ITF event in Sheffield.

In November 2023, Hussey reached the final of the ITF M25 Edmonton National Bank Challenger in singles, losing in the final to Justin Boulais. That month, he also reached the final of the 2023 Challenger Banque Nationale de Drummondville doubles tournament alongside Liam Draxl.

=== 2024-2026: ATP debut and first wins ===
In June, he defeated world No. 98 Arthur Cazaux in qualifying at the 2024 Eastbourne International but lost in the second round to fifth qualifying seed Shang Juncheng. Despite the loss, he made his ATP Tour main draw debut at the event as a lucky loser, against sixth seed and world No. 32 Mariano Navone, and won in straight sets, for the biggest win of his career by ranking. He was drafted into the match with just 45 minutes notice following the withdrawal of Kei Nishikori. He lost to Flavio Cobolli in three sets.

Ranked at a career-high of No. 293 at the 2026 Eastbourne Open where Hussey qualified for the main draw, he defeated Roland Garros semifinalist and world No. 35 Matteo Arnaldi for the second-biggest win of his career by ranking, and also only his second at tour-level.

== ATP Challenger and ITF World Tennis Tour finals ==
=== Singles: 15 (9 titles, 6 runner-ups) ===
Legend ATP Challenger Tour (1–0) ITF World Tennis Tour (8–6)	Finals by surface Hard (9–6)

Result	W–L	Date	Tournament	Tier	Surface	Opponent	Score
Win	1–0	May 2026	Centurion Challenger, South Africa	Challenger	Hard	(Australia) Edward Winter	6–3, 6–3
Win	1–0	Oct 2021	M15 Cancún, Mexico	WTT	Hard	(United States) Christian Langmo	6–3, 5–7, 6–4
Loss	1–1	Nov 2021	M15 Cancún, Mexico	WTT	Hard	(Vietnam) Lý Hoàng Nam	4–6, 4–6
Loss	1–2	Aug 2022	M25 Roehampton, UK	WTT	Hard	(France) Antoine Hoang	4–6, 4–6
Loss	1–3	Oct 2022	M25 Sheffield, UK	WTT	Hard (i)	(United Kingdom) Arthur Fery	3–6, 2–6
Win	2–3	Sep 2023	M15 Budapest, Hungary	WTT	Hard	(Brazil) Gabriel Décamps	2–6, 6–3, 6–3
Win	3–3	Sep 2023	M15 Danderyd, Sweden	WTT	Hard (i)	(Germany) Mats Rosenkranz	6–2, 6–3
Loss	3–4	Nov 2023	M25 Edmonton, Canada	WTT	Hard (i)	(Canada) Justin Boulais	6–3, 6–7^{(1–7)}, 0–6
Win	4–4	Mar 2024	M15 Les Franqueses del Vallès, Spain	WTT	Hard	(Colombia) Adrià Soriano Barrera	4–6, 6–3, 6–1
Win	5–4	Mar 2024	M15 Sharm El Sheikh, Egypt	WTT	Hard	(Ukraine) Vadym Ursu	6–2, 6–4
Win	6–4	Apr 2024	M15 Monastir, Tunisia	WTT	Hard	(Slovakia) Lukáš Pokorný	0–6, 6–4, 6–4
Loss	6–5	Jan 2025	M25 Bali, Indonesia	WTT	Hard	(South Korea) Chung Hyeon	1–6, 2–6
Win	7–5	Apr 2025	M15 Monastir, Tunisia	WTT	Hard	(Latvia) Robert Strombachs	3–6, 7–6^{(7–2)}, 6–4
Win	8–5	Sep 2025	M15 Madrid, Spain	WTT	Hard	(France) Matisse Bobichon	6–3, 6–0
Loss	8–6	Mar 2026	M25 Vale Do Lobo, Portugal	WTT	Hard	(United Kingdom) Toby Samuel	3–6, 4–6

=== Doubles: 22 (11 titles, 11 runner-ups) ===
Legend ATP Challenger Tour (1–3) ITF World Tennis Tour (10–8)	Finals by surface Hard (10–11) Clay (1–0)

Result	W–L	Date	Tournament	Tier	Surface	Partner	Opponents	Score
Loss	0–1	Nov 2022	Challenger de Drummondville, Canada	Challenger	Hard (i)	(United Kingdom) Arthur Fery	(United Kingdom) Julian Cash (United Kingdom) Henry Patten	3–6, 3–6
Loss	0–2	Nov 2023	Challenger de Drummondville, Canada	Challenger	Hard (i)	(Canada) Liam Draxl	(Sweden) André Göransson (United Kingdom) Toby Samuel	7–6^{(7–2)}, 3–6, [8–10]
Win	1–2	Oct 2025	Crete Challenger, Greece	Challenger	Hard	(United Kingdom) Mark Whitehouse	(France) Geoffrey Blancaneaux (Belgium) Michael Geerts	6–4, 4–6, [10–5]
Loss	1–3	Apr 2026	Wuning Challenger, China	Challenger	Hard	(Belgium) Buvaysar Gadamauri	(Australia) Joshua Charlton (United Kingdom) Ben Jones	4–6, 2–6
Loss	0–1	May 2022	M15 Akko, Israel	WTT	Hard	(United Kingdom) Daniel Little	(Israel) Daniel Cukierman (Israel) Edan Leshem	3–6, 4–6
Loss	0–2	May 2022	M25 Netanya, Israel	WTT	Hard	(United Kingdom) Daniel Little	(Australia) Aaron Addison (Australia) Calum Puttergill	3–6, 6–3, [7–10]
Win	1–2	Jun 2022	M15 Ra'anana, Israel	WTT	Hard	(United Kingdom) Ben Jones	(France) Robin Catry (Australia) Timothy Gray	6–4, 6–2
Win	2–2	Aug 2022	M25 Roehampton, UK	WTT	Hard	(United Kingdom) Joe Tyler	(United Kingdom) Arthur Fery (United Kingdom) Mark Whitehouse	7–5, 6–3
Win	3–2	Sep 2022	M15 Haren, Netherlands	WTT	Clay	(Estonia) Kristjan Tamm	(Germany) Edison Ambarzumjan (Germany) Aaron James Williams	6–3, 6–1
Win	4–2	Oct 2022	M25 Falun, Sweden	WTT	Hard (i)	(United Kingdom) Johannus Monday	(Finland) Vesa Ahti (Sweden) Arslanbek Temirhanov	4–6, 7–5, [10–4]
Win	5–2	Oct 2022	M25 Sheffield, UK	WTT	Hard (i)	(United Kingdom) Johannus Monday	(Finland) Eero Vasa (United Kingdom) Mark Whitehouse	7–5, 6–4
Loss	5–3	Oct 2022	M25 Sunderland, UK	WTT	Hard (i)	(United Kingdom) Johannus Monday	(United Kingdom) Arthur Fery (Croatia) Mili Poljičak	3–6, 4–6
Win	6–3	Oct 2022	M25 Glasgow, UK	WTT	Hard (i)	(Israel) Daniel Cukierman	(United Kingdom) Anton Matusevich (United Kingdom) Joshua Paris	6–7^{(3–7)}, 6–4, [10–8]
Loss	6–4	Apr 2023	M25 Trento, Italy	WTT	Hard (i)	(United Kingdom) Ben Jones	(United Kingdom) Daniel Little (United Kingdom) Mark Whitehouse	6–7^{(6–8)}, 3–6
Loss	6–5	May 2023	M25 Nottingham, UK	WTT	Hard	(United Kingdom) Ben Jones	(United Kingdom) Scott Duncan (United Kingdom) Marcus Willis	3–6, 2–6
Win	7–5	May 2023	M15 Monastir, Tunisia	WTT	Hard	(United Kingdom) Millen Hurrion	(France) Adrien Gobat (France) Alexandre Reco	6–4, 6–4
Win	8–5	Nov 2023	M25 Edmonton, Canada	WTT	Hard (i)	(South Africa) Vasilios Caripi	(Canada) Justin Boulais (Republic of Ireland) Osgar O'Hoisin	walkover
Win	9–5	Mar 2024	M15 Torello, Spain	WTT	Hard	(United Kingdom) James Davis	(Luxembourg) Alex Knaff (Germany) Niklas Schell	6–1, 6–2
Loss	9–6	Apr 2024	M15 Monastir, Tunisia	WTT	Hard	(United Kingdom) James Davis	(Uzbekistan) Denis Istomin; Evgeny Karlovskiy	walkover
Loss	9–7	Jan 2025	M25 Sunderland, UK	WTT	Hard (i)	(United Kingdom) James Story	(Czech Republic) David Poljak (United Kingdom) Hamish Stewart	walkover
Loss	9–8	Nov 2025	M25 Manama, Bahrain	WTT	Hard	(Netherlands) Jelle Sels	(Chinese Taipei) Jeffrey Hsu (Latvia) Kārlis Ozoliņš	6–2, 4–6, [5–10]
Win	10–8	Feb 2026	M25 Glasgow, UK	WTT	Hard (i)	(United Kingdom) Charles Broom	(United Kingdom) Tom Hands (United Kingdom) Harry Wendelken	3–6, 6–3, [10–8]
