= Maxim Mrva =

Czech tennis player (born 2007)

- Country (sports): Czech Republic
- Born: 2 August 2007 (age 19) Prostějov, Czech Republic
- Height: 1.80 m (5 ft 11 in)
- Plays: Right-handed (two-handed backhand)
- Coach: Emanuel Řehola
- Prize money: US $118,722

Singles
- Career record: 1–1 (at ATP Tour level, Grand Slam level, and in Davis Cup)
- Career titles: 0
- Highest ranking: No. 209 (14 September 2026)
- Current ranking: No. 209 (14 September 2026)

Doubles
- Career record: 0–0 (at ATP Tour level, Grand Slam level, and in Davis Cup)
- Career titles: 0
- Highest ranking: No. 865 (4 May 2026)
- Current ranking: No. 1,470 (14 September 2026)
- Last updated on: 14 September 2026.

Maxim Mrva (born 2 August 2007) is a Czech professional tennis player. He has a career-high ATP singles ranking of No. 209 achieved on 14 September 2026 and a doubles ranking of No. 865 achieved on 4 May 2026.

Mrva won the boys' doubles title at the 2024 US Open, with Rei Sakamoto.

== Early life ==
Mrva was born in Prostějov. He began playing tennis at the age of five, introduced to the sport by his older brother. He also played football in his youth with compatriot Jan Kumstát. He represents TK Agrofert Prostějov.

== Junior career ==
In September 2021, he won the Petits As, defeating Federico Cinà in the final. In October 2022, he won the J1 Torneo Internacional Junior in Sanxenxo. In January 2023, he made his Junior Grand Slam debut at the Australian Open, where he reached the second round in singles. That year, he represented the Czech Republic at the Junior Davis Cup, where he won the title with Jan Kumstát and Martin Doskočil.

In April 2024, he won the J500 tournament in Offenbach. Later that year, he and Rei Sakamoto won the boys' doubles title at the 2024 US Open. He also reached the final of the J300 IMG Academy International Championships in Bradenton, but lost to Andrés Santamarta Roig.

Mrva had successful results on the ITF junior circuit, maintaining a 105–49 singles win-loss record. He reached an ITF junior combined ranking of world No. 2 on 6 January 2025.

== Professional career ==
In September 2024, he won his first professional singles title at the $15k Pardubice Open, defeating Miloš Karol in the final. In January 2025, he received an invitation to represent the Czech Republic at the Davis Cup. On his debut in the first round of qualifiers, he defeated Shin San-hui of South Korea. That March, he made his ATP Challenger Tour main draw debut at the Open Città della Disfida, where he reached the semifinals with wins over Ergi Kırkın, Mili Poljičak, and Matej Dodig. Mrva won his first Challenger title at the 2026 Internazionali di Tennis Città di Todi, defeating Nicolás Kicker in the final.

== ATP Challenger Tour finals ==
=== Singles: 3 (1 title, 2 runner-ups) ===
Legend ATP Challenger Tour (1–2)

Result	W–L	Date	Tournament	Tier	Surface	Opponent	Score
Loss	0–1	Oct 2025	Crete Challenger VI, Greece	Challenger	Hard	(United Kingdom) Harry Wendelken	4–6, 3–6
Loss	0–2	Mar 2026	Crete Challenger II, Greece	Challenger	Hard	(United Kingdom) Toby Samuel	2–6, 3–6
Win	1–2	Aug 2026	Internazionali Città di Todi, Italy	Challenger	Clay	(Argentina) Nicolás Kicker	6–2, 6–2

== ITF World Tennis Tour finals ==
=== Singles: 3 (1 title, 2 runner-ups) ===
Legend ITF WTT (1–2)

Result	W–L	Date	Tournament	Tier	Surface	Opponent	Score
Win	1–0	Sep 2024	M15 Pardubice, Czech Republic	WTT	Clay	(Slovakia) Miloš Karol	6–4, 7–5
Loss	1–1	Mar 2025	M15 Monastir, Tunisia	WTT	Hard	(France) Florent Bax	0–6, 3–6
Loss	1–2	Sep 2025	M25 Pardubice, Czech Republic	WTT	Clay	(Czech Republic) Martin Krumich	2–6, 4–6

== Junior Grand Slam finals ==
=== Doubles: 1 (title) ===
Result	Year	Tournament	Surface	Partner	Opponents	Score
Win	2024	US Open	Hard	(Japan) Rei Sakamoto	(Czech Republic) Denis Peták (Switzerland) Flynn Thomas	7–5, 7–6^{(7–1)}
