= Stuart Parker (tennis) =

British tennis player

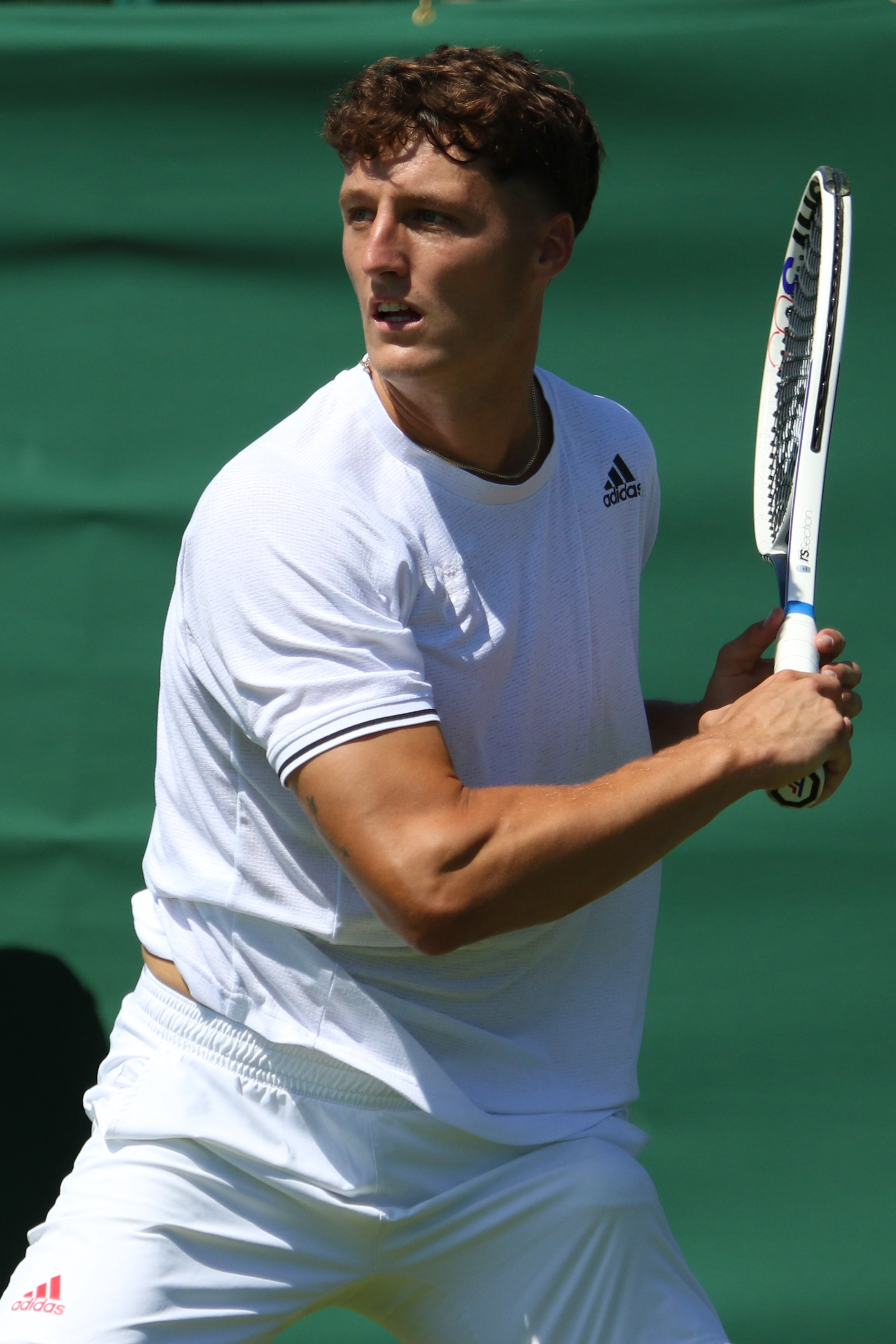
- Full name: Stuart Parker
- Country (sports): Great Britain
- Residence: Jersey
- Born: 30 July 1997 (age 28) Port Elizabeth, South Africa
- Height: 1.85 m (6 ft 1 in)
- Plays: Right handed (two-handed backhand)
- Coach: Thomas Enqvist
- Prize money: $178,564

Singles
- Career record: 0–0 (at ATP Tour level, Grand Slam level, and in Davis Cup)
- Career titles: 0
- Highest ranking: No. 346 (17 October 2022)
- Current ranking: No. 766 (13 July 2026)

Grand Slam singles results
- Wimbledon: Q1 (2021, 2022, 2023, 2024)

Doubles
- Career record: 0–2 (at ATP Tour level, Grand Slam level, and in Davis Cup)
- Career titles: 0
- Highest ranking: No. 471 (26 June 2023)
- Current ranking: No. 775 (13 July 2026)

Grand Slam doubles results
- Wimbledon: 1R (2021)
- Last updated on: 15 July 2026.

Stuart Parker (born 30 July 1997) is a British tennis player.

== Career ==
In February and March 2021, Parker won two titles on the ITF circuit, both in Tunisia.

He was selected for a wildcard into the 2021 Queen's Club Championships – Doubles main draw partnering James Ward. He was also awarded a wildcard into the qualifying rounds of the singles and lost to Spain's Bernabé Zapata Miralles in straight sets.

He received a wildcard for the main draw of the 2021 Wimbledon Championships men's doubles alongside Ward, and a wildcard into the qualifying for the men's singles.

In September 2022, Parker won his maiden Challenger tournament in Nonthaburi, entering the main draw as a qualifier and defeating Arthur Cazaux by retirement in the final.

In August 2025, Parker won his second Challenger doubles title at the 2025 Crete Challenger III, paired with Filippo Moroni.

=== Coaching ===
Parker is coached by former world No. 4 Thomas Enqvist at his base in Aix-en-Provence.

== ATP Challenger and ITF Tour finals ==
=== Singles: 14 (6–8) ===
Legend ATP Challenger (1–1) ITF Futures (5–7)	Finals by surface Hard (6–7) Clay (0–0) Grass (0–1)

Result	W–L	Date	Tournament	Tier	Surface	Opponent	Score
Win	1–0	Feb 2021	M15 Monastir, Tunisia	World Tennis Tour	Hard	(Belgium) Yannick Mertens	6–3, 4–6, 7–6^{(7–5)}
Win	2–0	Feb 2021	M15 Monastir, Tunisia	World Tennis Tour	Hard	(France) Alexis Gautier	3–6, 7–5, 6–3
Loss	2–1	Nov 2021	M25 Meitar, Israel	World Tennis Tour	Hard	(Israel) Yshai Oliel	2–6, 4–6
Win	3–1	Nov 2021	M15 Monastir, Tunisia	World Tennis Tour	Hard	(France) Ugo Blanchet	6–2, 6–4
Loss	3–2	May 2022	M25 Nottingham, United Kingdom	World Tennis Tour	Grass	(Switzerland) Leandro Riedi	1–6, 7–6^{(13–11)}, 1–6
Win	4–2	Sep 2022	Nonthaburi 3, Thailand	Challenger	Hard	(France) Arthur Cazaux	6–4, 4–1 ret.
Loss	4–3	Oct 2023	M15 Sharm El Sheikh, Egypt	World Tennis Tour	Hard	(Egypt) Mohamed Safwat	2–6, 6–3, 3–6
Loss	4–4	Oct 2023	M15 Sharm El Sheikh, Egypt	World Tennis Tour	Hard	(Egypt) Mohamed Safwat	5–7, 5–7
Loss	4–5	Apr 2024	M15 Monastir, Tunisia	World Tennis Tour	Hard	(Slovakia) Lukáš Pokorný	5–7, 1–6
Win	5–5	May 2024	M15 Monastir, Tunisia	World Tennis Tour	Hard	(Germany) Max Wiskandt	7–5, 6–2
Loss	5–6	Oct 2024	M25 Norwich, United Kingdom	World Tennis Tour	Hard	(France) Clément Chidekh	3–6, 6–7^{(6–8)}
Loss	5–7	Mar 2025	Hersonissos, Greece	Challenger	Hard	(Lithuania) Edas Butvilas	3–6, 3–6
Win	6–7	Mar 2025	M15 Heraklion, Greece	World Tennis Tour	Hard	(Greece) Stefanos Sakellaridis	6–2, 6–2
Loss	6–8	Apr 2025	M15 Heraklion, Greece	World Tennis Tour	Hard	(Greece) Stefanos Sakellaridis	6–2, 1–6, 4–6

=== Doubles: 10 (6–4) ===
Legend ATP Challenger (1–1) ITF Futures (5–3)	Finals by surface Hard (3–4) Clay (2–0) Grass (1–0) Carpet (0–0)

Result	W–L	Date	Tournament	Tier	Surface	Partner	Opponents	Score
Loss	0–1	Aug 2019	M15 Sintra, Portugal	World Tennis Tour	Hard	(Lithuania) Julius Tverijonas	(Republic of Ireland) Peter Bothwell (France) Maxime Tchoutakian	3–6, 2–6
Loss	0–2	Nov 2021	M15 Monastir, Tunisia	World Tennis Tour	Hard	(France) Arthur Bouquier	(Serbia) Viktor Jovic (Tunisia) Aziz Ouakaa	4–6, 6–3, [7–10]
Win	1–2	Dec 2021	M15 Monastir, Tunisia	World Tennis Tour	Hard	(France) Arthur Bouquier	(Italy) Omar Brigida (Italy) Alessandro Coccioli	7–5, 4–6, [10–7]
Win	2–2	Jul 2022	M25 Nottingham, Great Britain	World Tennis Tour	Grass	(United Kingdom) Alastair Gray	(United Kingdom) Charles Broom (United Kingdom) Luke Johnson	7–6^{(7–4)}, 4–6, [10–5]
Loss	2–3	Jan 2023	Nonthaburi, Thailand	Challenger	Hard	(United Kingdom) Jan Choinski	(South Korea) Nam Ji-sung (South Korea) Song Min-kyu	4–6, 4–6
Win	3–3	May 2023	M25 Prague, Czech Republic	World Tennis Tour	Clay	(Switzerland) Jakub Paul	(United States) Martin Damm (United States) Alex Rybakov	3–6, 6–3, [10–6]
Win	4–3	May 2023	M25 Most, Czech Republic	World Tennis Tour	Clay	(Switzerland) Jakub Paul	(Czech Republic) Ondrej Horak (Czech Republic) Daniel Siniakov	6–3, 6–2
Win	5–3	Jul 2023	M25 Porto, Portugal	World Tennis Tour	Hard	(United Kingdom) Arthur Fery	(Portugal) Diego Fernandez Flores (Portugal) Duarte Vale	6–1, 6–3
Loss	5–4	Jan 2024	M15 Monastir, Tunisia	World Tennis Tour	Hard	(Switzerland) Jakub Paul	(Germany) Christoph Negritu (United States) Michael Zhu	3–6, 6–2, [6–10]
Win	6–4	Aug 2025	Hersonissos, Greece	Challenger	Hard	(Italy) Filippo Moroni	(France) Dan Added (France) Arthur Reymond	6–4, 6–4
