= Filippo Moroni =

Italian tennis player (born 2001)

- Country (sports): Italy
- Born: 1 February 2001 (age 25) Turin, Italy
- Height: 1.75 m (5 ft 9 in)
- Plays: Right-handed (two-handed backhand)
- College: Wake Forest
- Prize money: US $42,569

Singles
- Career record: 0–0 (at ATP Tour level, Grand Slam level, and in Davis Cup)
- Career titles: 3 ITF
- Highest ranking: No. 470 (24 November 2025)
- Current ranking: No. 944 (14 September 2026)

Doubles
- Career record: 0–1 (at ATP Tour level, Grand Slam level, and in Davis Cup)
- Career titles: 1 Challenger, 1 ITF
- Highest ranking: No. 448 (13 July 2026)
- Current ranking: No. 649 (14 September 2026)
- Last updated on: 16 September 2026.

Filippo Moroni (born 1 February 2001) is an Italian tennis player. Moroni has a career high ATP singles ranking of No. 470 achieved on 24 November 2025 and a career high ATP doubles ranking of No. 448 achieved on 13 July 2026.

== Career ==
Moroni played college tennis at Wake Forest University.

Moroni made his ATP main draw debut at the 2023 Winston-Salem Open after receiving a wildcard into the doubles main draw. He won his Maiden Challenger doubles title at the 2025 Crete Challenger III, paired with Stuart Parker.
