= Crete Challenger =

- 2026 Crete Challenger II

ATP Challenger Tour
- Location: Hersonissos, Greece
- Venue: Lyttos Sportscenter
- Category: ATP Challenger Tour
- Surface: Hard
- Prize money: €54,000
- Website: website

The Iconico Crete Challenger is a professional tennis tournament played on hardcourts. It is currently part of the ATP Challenger Tour. It was first held in Hersonissos, Greece in 2025 in six editions.

== Past finals ==
=== Singles ===
Year	Champion	Runner-up	Score
2026 (3)	(Italy) Michele Ribecai	(South Africa) Philip Henning	4–6, 6–2, 6–0
2026 (2)	(United Kingdom) Toby Samuel	(Czech Republic) Maxim Mrva	6–2, 6–3
2026 (1)	(United Kingdom) Toby Samuel	(United Kingdom) Harry Wendelken	6–3, 6–0
2025 (6)	(United Kingdom) Harry Wendelken	(Czech Republic) Maxim Mrva	6–4, 6–3
2025 (5)	(United Kingdom) Ryan Peniston	(Belgium) Kimmer Coppejans	6–3, 7–5
2025 (4)	(Tunisia) Moez Echargui	(France) Dan Added	5–7, 6–4, 3–0 ret.
2025 (3)	(Spain) Rafael Jódar	(France) Dan Added	6–4, 6–2
2025 (2)	(Bulgaria) Dimitar Kuzmanov	(Italy) Federico Cinà	6–4, 6–2
2025 (1)	(Lithuania) Edas Butvilas	(United Kingdom) Stuart Parker	6–3, 6–3

=== Doubles ===
Year	Champions	Runners-up	Score
2026 (3)	(Greece) Pavlos Tsitsipas (Greece) Petros Tsitsipas	(Bulgaria) Alex Ganchev (Luxembourg) Sacha Maes	7–5, 7–6^{(7–4)}
2026 (2)	(Belgium) Michael Geerts (Portugal) Tiago Pereira	(Bulgaria) Petr Nesterov (Ukraine) Oleksandr Ovcharenko	3–6, 6–4, [10–5]
2026 (1)	(Italy) Jacopo Berrettini (Belgium) Kimmer Coppejans	(United Kingdom) Finn Bass (Bulgaria) Anthony Genov	3–6, 6–1, [10–3]
2025 (6)	(United Kingdom) Giles Hussey (United Kingdom) Mark Whitehouse	(France) Geoffrey Blancaneaux (Belgium) Michael Geerts	6–4, 4–6, [10–5]
2025 (5)	(Spain) Alberto Barroso Campos (Spain) Iñaki Montes de la Torre	(Czech Republic) David Poljak (France) Max Westphal	7–5, 7–6^{(7–3)}
2025 (4)	(Germany) Mats Rosenkranz (United Kingdom) Harry Wendelken	(Romania) Victor Vlad Cornea (Finland) Patrik Niklas-Salminen	4–6, 6–4, [10–7]
2025 (3)	(Italy) Filippo Moroni (United Kingdom) Stuart Parker	(France) Dan Added (France) Arthur Reymond	6–4, 6–4
2025 (2)	(Greece) Stefanos Sakellaridis (Greece) Petros Tsitsipas	Ilia Simakin (Canada) Kelsey Stevenson	6–2, 6–2
2025 (1)	(Bolivia) Juan Carlos Prado Ángelo (United Kingdom) Mark Whitehouse	(Austria) Dennis Novak (Hungary) Zsombor Piros	7–6^{(9–7)}, 6–2
