= Mark Whitehouse =

British tennis player (born 1993)

- Country (sports): United Kingdom
- Born: 1 May 1993 (age 33) Reigate, England
- Height: 188 cm (6 ft 2 in)
- Plays: Right-handed, Two-handed backhand

Singles
- Career record: 0–0 (at ATP Tour level, Grand Slam level, and in Davis Cup)
- Highest ranking: No. 523 (19 December 2022)
- Current ranking: No. 1,250 (16 February 2026)

Doubles
- Career record: 0–0 (at ATP Tour level, Grand Slam level, and in Davis Cup)
- Highest ranking: No. 192 (3 November 2025)
- Current ranking: No. 213 (16 February 2026)
- Last updated on: 17 February 2026.

Mark Whitehouse (born 5 May 1993) is a British tennis player. He has a career high doubles ranking of No. 192 achieved on 3 November 2025 and a career high singles ranking of No. 523 achieved on 19 December 2022.

== Early life ==
Whitehouse studied maths at Imperial College London. In March 2015, he became the British Universities and Colleges Sport (BUCS) men's singles tennis champion. He competed at the 2015 University Games in South Korea.

== Career ==
In June 2023 he defeated the higher ranked Antoine Bellier and James McCabe to qualify for the Surbiton Trophy singles main draw, before losing in straight sets to Zizou Bergs. Whitehouse played alongside Eric Vanshelboim to win the M25 Oldenzaal doubles event in August 2024.

He played doubles alongside compatriot Charles Broom on the Challenger Tour in 2025. In March 2025, playing alongside Juan Carlos Prado Ángelo he reached the final of the 2025 Crete Challenger where they faced Dennis Novak and Zsombor Piros, winning in straight sets.
