= Hersonissos =

Hersonissos Χερσόνησος Chersónisos, Cherso
- Municipality
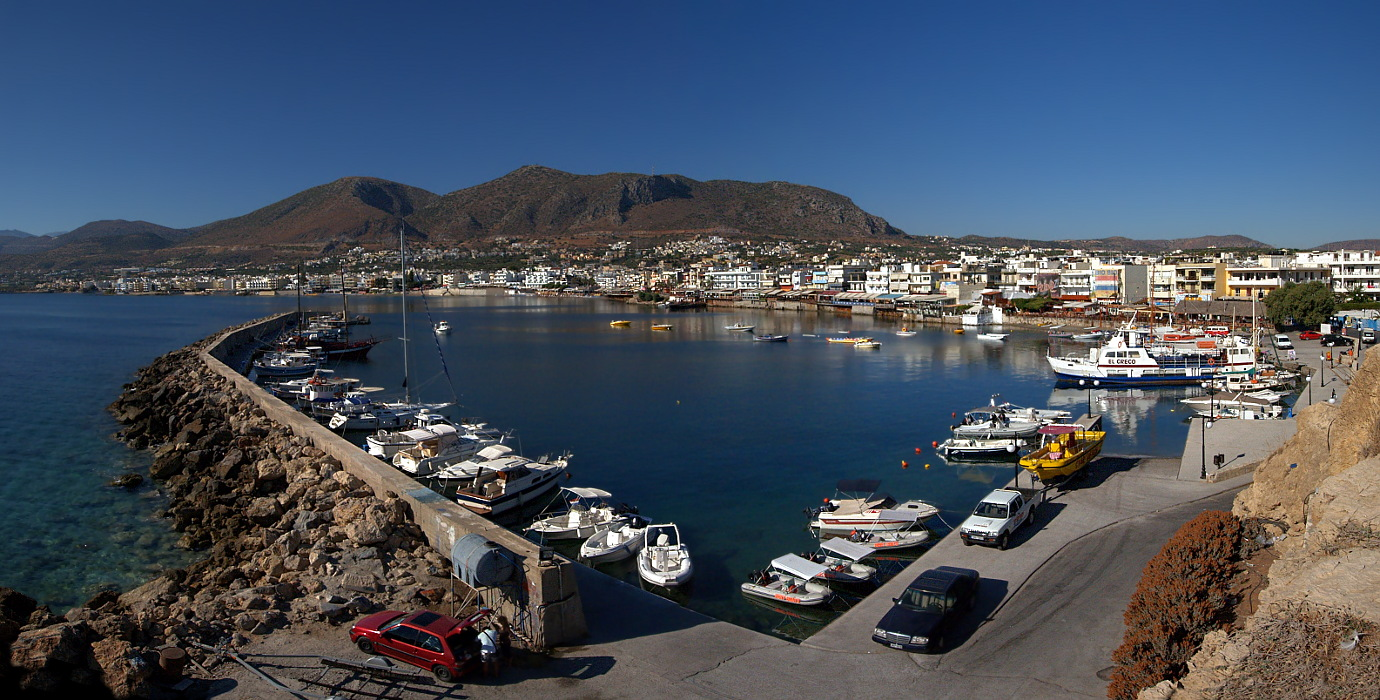
- View of the city.

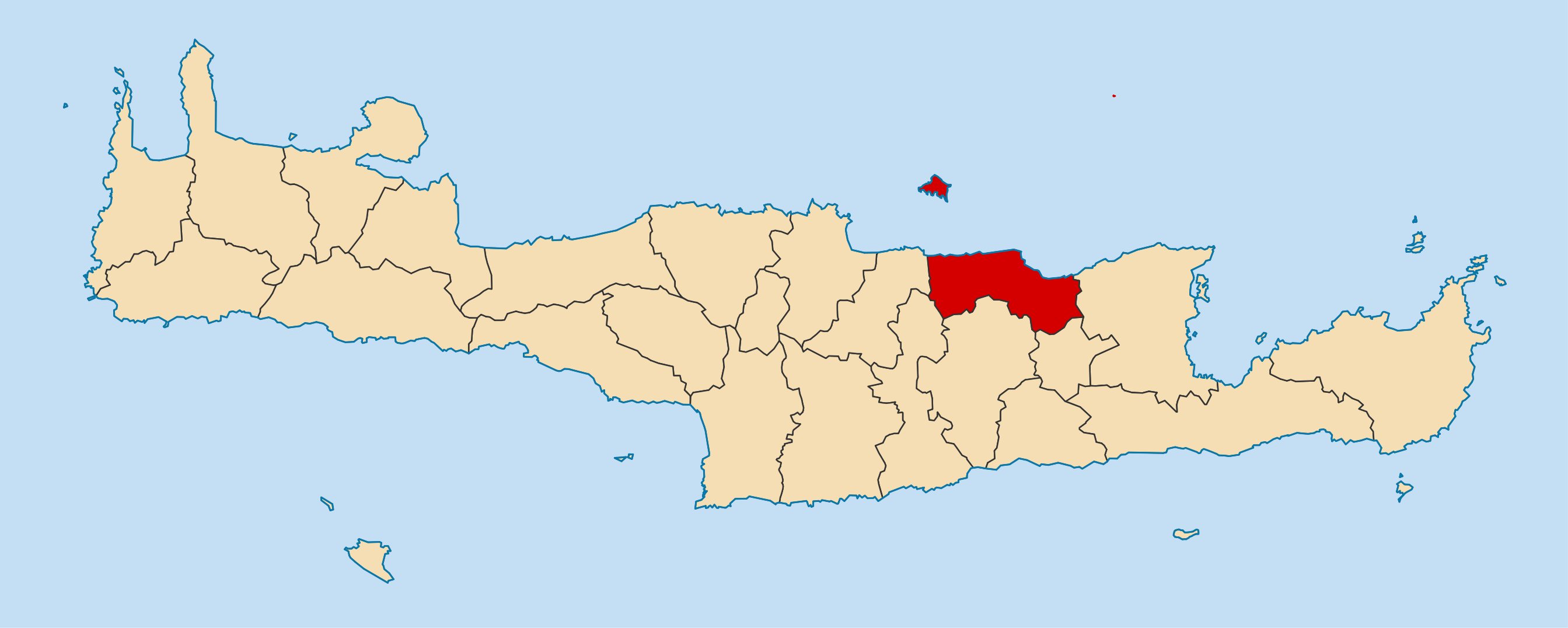

- Location within Greece
- Coordinates: 35°19′N 25°23.4′E
- Country: Greece
- Administrative region: Crete
- Regional unit: Heraklion

Area
  - Municipality: 272.2 km^{2} (105.1 sq mi)
  - Municipal unit: 71.0 km^{2} (27.4 sq mi)
- Elevation: 28 m (92 ft)

Population (2021)
  - Municipality: 27,220
  - Density: 100.0/km^{2} (259.0/sq mi)
  - Municipal unit: 7,333
  - Municipal unit density: 103/km^{2} (267/sq mi)
  - Community: 2,985
- Time zone: UTC+2 (EET)
  - Summer (DST): UTC+3 (EEST)
- Website: www.hersonissos.gr

Hersonissos (Greek: Χερσόνησος, meaning “peninsula”, Chersónisos, pronounced [xerˈsonisos], also transliterated as Chersonissos and Hersónisos, nicknamed Cherso) is a town and a local government unit in the north of Crete, bordering the Mediterranean / Aegean Sea. The town is about 25 kilometers east of Heraklion and west of Agios Nikolaos. What is usually called Hersonissos is in fact its peninsula and harbour. It is part of the Heraklion regional unit. It is situated 25 km from the Heraklion airport and 27 km from the Heraklion port. The seat of the local government unit is the village of Gournes.

== Geography ==
The seaside resort of Hersonissos is officially the Port of Hersonissos (Greek: Λιμένας Χερσόνησου, Liménas Chersónissou) in distinction to the village of Upper Hersonissos (Greek: Άνω Χερσόνησος, Ano Chersónissos) further inland. Through tourism, the port town developed from the small harbour which served the original village, now known as Old Hersonissos.

== History ==
The ancient town of Chersonasus was important enough in the Roman province of Creta et Cyrenaica early to become a Christian bishopric, a suffragan of the metropolitan see of Gortyna.

The names of some of its bishops appear in extant documents: Anderius took part in the Council of Ephesus in 431; Longinus in the Robber Council of 449; Euphratas was a signatory of the letter sent by the bishops of the province to the emperor Leo I the Thracian in 458 after the killing of Proterius of Alexandria; Sisinnius was at the Trullan Council in 692; and another Sisinnius at the Second Council of Nicaea in 787.

== Latin bishopric ==
After the Venetian conquest of Crete in 1212, the existing dioceses, such as Chersonesus, were administered by Latin Church bishops.

The line of residential Latin bishops of Chersonesus ended with the conquest of Crete by the Ottomans in 1669.

=== Titular see ===
No longer a residential bishopric, Chersonnesus in Creta is today listed by the Catholic Church as a titular bishopric, as such nominally restored in 1787 under the name ‘Chersonesus’, changed in 1933 to Chersonesus in Creta, avoiding confusing with other Latin sees called Chersonesus.

It is vacant, having had the following incumbents, all of the lowest (episcopal) rank:

- Karel Otčenášek (1950.03.30 – 1989.12.21) (later Archbishop)*
- Titular Bishop: Bishop Antonio Cardona Riera (later Archbishop) (1928.03.10 – 1950.02.02)
- Titular Bishop: Bishop Rafael Balanzá y Navarro (1923.08.13 – 1928.03.02)
- Titular Bishop: Bishop Marc Chatagnon (沙), M.E.P. (1887.01.25 – 1920.11.26)
- Titular Bishop: Bishop Johann Theodor Laurent (1839.09.17 – 1884.02.20)
- Titular Bishop: Bishop Viktor Franz Anton von Glutz-Ruchti (1820.05.29 – 1824.10.09)
- Titular Bishop: Bishop Ambrosi de Magistris (1818.10.02 – ?)
- Titular Bishop: Bishop Johann Casimir von Häffelin (later Cardinal)* (1787.09.28 – 1818.04.06)

== Municipality of Hersonissos ==
The municipality of Hersonissos was formed at the 2011 local government reform by the merger of the following 4 former municipalities, that became municipal units. These were Episkopi, Gouves, Hersonissos and Malia.

The municipality has an area of 272.17 km^{2} (105.09 sq mi), the municipal unit 70.98 km^{2} (27.41 sq mi).

== Ancient remains ==
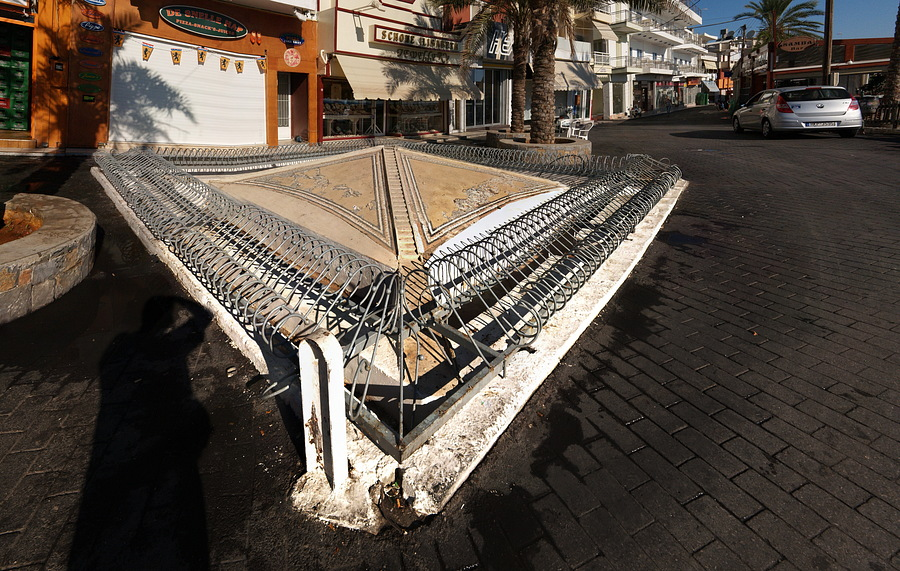
Roman fountain in Hersonissos

At the modern settlement of Hersonissos is the site of the ancient town of Chersonesos, an important seaport from Classical Greece through Byzantine times that served the city of Lyttos. The contemporaneous pleasure port is built over the remains of the Roman port. Some traces of those remains, most of them submerged, are still visible in some places. On the seaside street there is a pyramidal Roman fountain with mosaics of fishing scenes. On the top of the rocky hill behind the port stand the ruins of an early Christian basilica with floor mosaics.

The vicinity of Hersonissos is noted for its prehistoric archaeological finds. On the coast approximately one kilometer to the east of Hersonissos was an ancient temple dedicated to the goddess Britomartis.

William Smith's Dictionary of Greek and Roman Geography states:

'CHERSONE’SUS (Χερσόνησος) … the haven of Lyctus, with a temple of Britomartis. 16 M P. from Cnossus. Robert Pashley found ruins close to a little port on the shore, and the actual names of the villages Khersónesos and Episcopianó, indicate that here is to be found what was once the ancient port of Lyctus, and afterwards became an Episcopal city.

The episcopal see associated with this town is now a titular see (“Chersonesus in Creta”) of the Catholic Church.

== Tourism ==
Hersonissos is a resort area in Crete, which also hosts the only golf club on the island. Tourist sites include; the Hersonissos Aquarium, Labyrinth Theme Park, and the Dinosauria Park in Gournes. There are several beaches in Hersonissos, some with blue flag status. These include Potamos (blue flag) Karteros, Tobruk, Arina (municipal beach), Vathianos Kampos, Kokkini Hani, Gournes, Gouves, Apolselemis, Analipsi, Anissara (blue flag), Sarantaris (municipal beach), Hersonissos, Stalida, Klotsani, Malia and Potamos (municipal beach and blue flag).

== Gallery ==
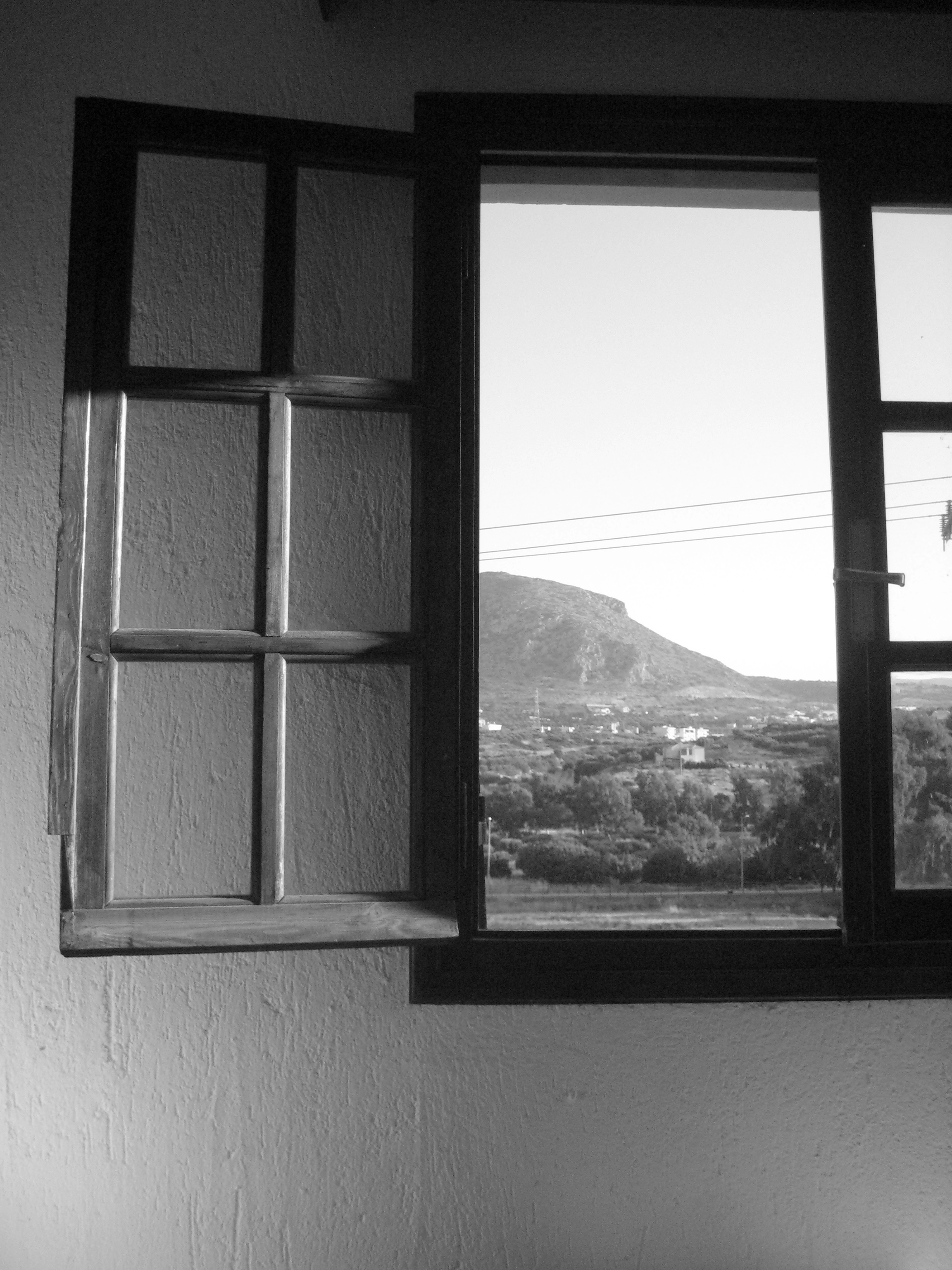
Window view towards Thymarmi

== Sources and external links ==
- Official website
- GCatholic.org
- Car Rental Hersonissos
