= Harry Wendelken =

British tennis player (born 2001)

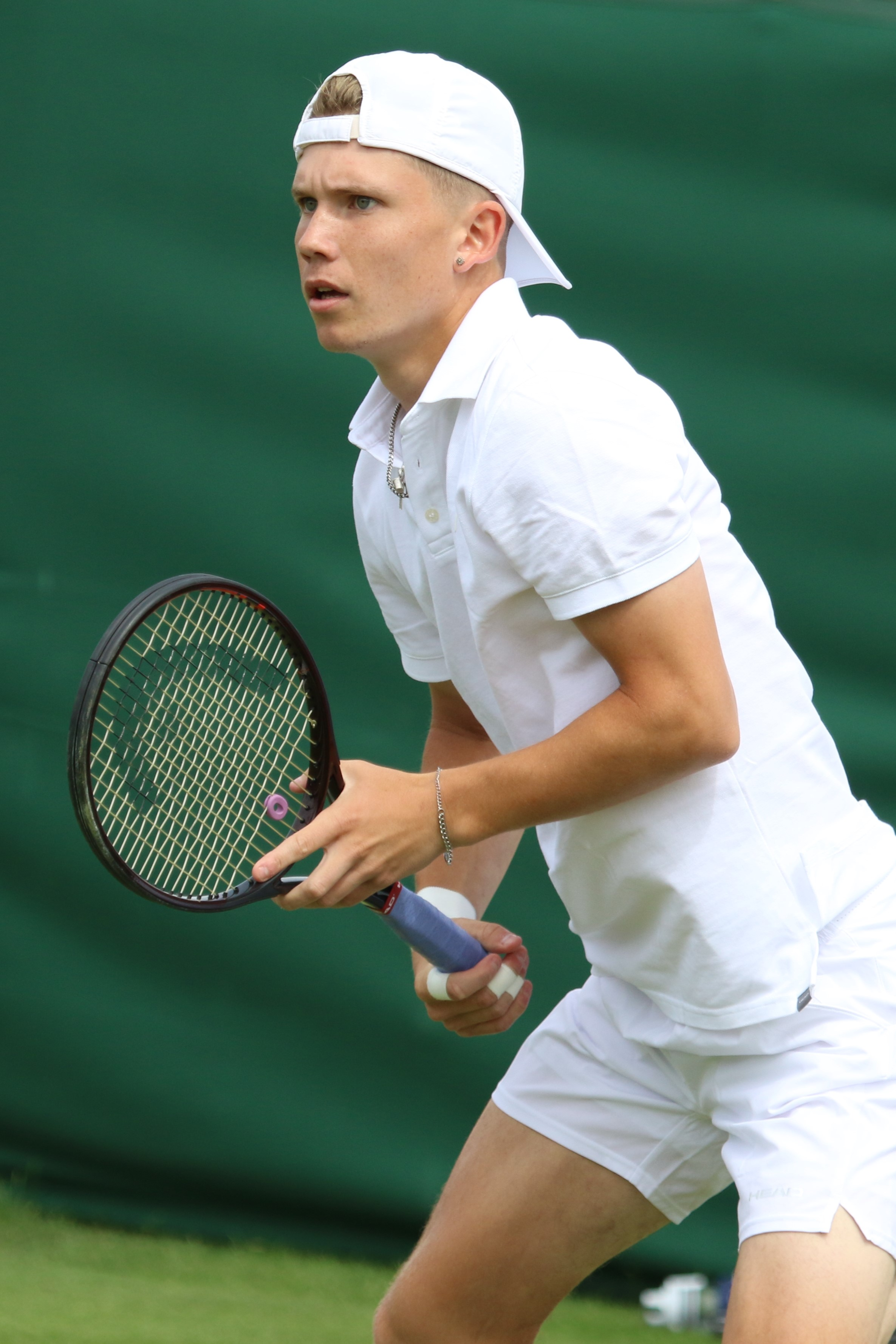
- Wendelken in Wimbledon 2023 Qualification
- Country (sports): Great Britain
- Born: 18 December 2001 (age 24) Cambridge, England
- Height: 1.78 m (5 ft 10 in)
- Turned pro: 2020
- Plays: Right-handed (two-handed backhand)
- Coach: Hamid Hejazi
- Prize money: US $494,252

Singles
- Career record: 0–3 (at ATP Tour level, Grand Slam level, and in Davis Cup)
- Career titles: 0
- Highest ranking: No. 175 (14 September 2026)
- Current ranking: No. 175 (14 September 2026)

Grand Slam singles results
- French Open: Q1 (2026)
- Wimbledon: 1R (2026)
- US Open: 1R (2026)

Doubles
- Career record: 0-1
- Highest ranking: No. 240 (6 April 2026)
- Current ranking: No. 325 (14 September 2026)

Grand Slam doubles results
- Australian Open: 0–1 (at ATP Tour level, Grand Slam level, and in Davis Cup)
- Wimbledon: 1R (2026)
- Australian Open Junior: 0
- Last updated on: 14 September 2026.

Harry Wendelken (born 18 December 2001) is a British tennis player. He has a career-high singles ranking of world No. 175 achieved on 14 September 2026 and a doubles ranking of No. 240 achieved on 6 April 2026.

== Early life ==
Originally from Horseheath in Cambridgeshire, Wendelken attended Linton Village College in nearby Linton. To aid his tennis development, he switched to Culford School in 2015.

== Career ==
=== 2018: Juniors ===
Given wildcards into the junior competitions at the 2018 Wimbledon Championships, he lost in the first round of the singles to Argentine Juan Manuel Cerundolo but reached the semifinals of the Wimbledon Juniors Boys’ Doubles alongside James Story before losing in two tie-breaks to eventual winners Yankı Erel and Otto Virtanen. Shortly afterwards he moved his base to the Good to Great Academy, near Stockholm in Sweden.

=== 2020-2023: Turned Pro ===
in February 2022, after turning pro, Wendelken reached his first $25,000 ITF Tour final as a wildcard entrant into a tournament in Shrewsbury where he was defeated by compatriot Alastair Gray. After overcoming illness and injury Wendelken had success on the British tour in 2022.

In September, Wendelken and Benjamin Hannestad were unseeded but won an ITF doubles title in Sintra Portugal.

In June 2023, Wendelken defeated the higher ranked Li Tu and Pierre-Hugues Herbert to qualify for the Surbiton Trophy main singles draw. In the first round he lost to Bu Yunchaokete. That month, he made his debut in qualifying for a Grand Slam tournament at the 2023 Wimbledon Championships, losing to world No. 254 Matteo Gigante in straight sets.

=== 2025: First ATP Challenger title ===
In August, Wendelken won the title in doubles of the Hersonissos 4 Challenger in Crete, Greece playing alongside Mats Rosenkranz, on a match tie-break. In October, playing alongside Hamish Stewart, he reached the final in doubles at the Open de Vendée in France on the Challenger Tour. Wendelken won his first singles title at the Hersonissos 6 Challenger defeating Maxim Mrva in straight sets in the final.

=== 2026: ATP & Major debuts, Challenger finals ===
Wendelken reached the final at the Miyazaki Challenger in April, losing to fellow Briton Liam Broady in three sets. The following week he made the final at the Wuning Challenger, but again missed out on the title, losing another three setter, this time to Pavel Kotov.

Ranked at a career-high of No. 203, he made his ATP debut at the 2026 Queen's Club Championships where he qualified for the main draw. Wendelken received a wildcard for the 2026 Wimbledon Championships making his Grand Slam debut, where he lost in four sets to Valentin Royer of France. In August, he came through three rounds of qualifiers to reach the main draw at the 2026 US Open, where he was drawn against Luciano Darderi, the 21st seed from Italy, in the first round.

On 20 September, Wendelken won on his Davis Cup debut, part of a 4-0 win over Ecuador as Great Britain secured a place at the Davis Cup Finals.

== Personal life ==
Wendelken has described himself as being good friends with Jack Draper and close to other British players on tour of a similar age, such as Blu Baker, Jacob Fearnley, Connor Thomson, Anton Matusevich and James Story. He is also a big cricket fan and played cricket for Essex from the age of seven to 12 years-old. He supports EFL Championship football club West Ham.

== ATP Challenger Tour finals ==
=== Singles: 4 (1 title, 3 runner-ups) ===
Finals by surface
Hard (1–3)
Clay (–)

| Result | W–L | Date | Tournament | Surface | Opponent | Score |
|---|---|---|---|---|---|---|
| Win | 1–0 | Oct 2025 | Crete Challenger VI, Greece | Hard | (Czech Republic) Maxim Mrva | 6–4, 6–3 |
| Loss | 1–1 | Mar 2026 | Crete Challenger, Greece | Hard | (United Kingdom) Toby Samuel | 3–6, 0–6 |
| Loss | 1–2 | Mar 2026 | Miyazaki, Japan | Hard | (United Kingdom) Liam Broady | 6–3, 2–6, 2–6 |
| Loss | 1–3 | Apr 2026 | Wuning Open, China | Hard | Pavel Kotov | 6–4, 3–6, 4–6 |

=== Doubles: 2 (1 title, 1 runner-up) ===
Finals by surface
Hard (1–1)
Clay (–)

| Result | W–L | Date | Tournament | Surface | Partner | Opponents | Score |
|---|---|---|---|---|---|---|---|
| Win | 1–0 | Aug 2025 | Crete Challenger, Greece | Hard | (Germany) Mats Rosenkranz | (Romania) Victor Vlad Cornea (Finland) Patrik Niklas-Salminen | 4–6, 6–4, [10–7] |
| Loss | 1–1 | Oct 2025 | Mouilleron-le-Captif, France | Hard | (United Kingdom) Hamish Stewart | (France) Grégoire Jacq (France) Albano Olivetti | 6–7(5–7), 3–6 |
