= Pavlos Tsitsipas =

Greek tennis player (born 2005)

- Country (sports): Greece
- Born: 23 July 2005 (age 21) Marousi, Greece
- Height: 1.96 m (6 ft 5 in)
- Plays: Right-handed (one-handed backhand)
- Prize money: US $58,951

Singles
- Career record: 0–0 (at ATP Tour level, Grand Slam level, and in Davis Cup)
- Career titles: 0
- Highest ranking: No. 881 (20 October 2025)
- Current ranking: No. 981 (16 November 2026)

Doubles
- Career record: 0–3 (at ATP Tour level, Grand Slam level, and in Davis Cup)
- Career titles: 1 ATP Challenger
- Highest ranking: No. 487 (16 November 2026)
- Current ranking: No. 487 (16 November 2026)
- Last updated on: 16 November 2026.

Pavlos Tsitsipas (Greek: Πάυλος Τσιτσιπάς, pronounced [ˈpavlos t͡sit͡siˈpas]; born 23 July 2005) is a Greek professional tennis player. Tsitsipas has a career high ATP singles ranking of world No. 881 achieved on 20 October 2025 and a career high ATP doubles ranking of No. 487 achieved on 16 November 2026. He has won one ATP Challenger title in doubles.

== Career ==
Tsitsipas made his ATP Tour main draw debut at the 2025 Dubai Championships in the doubles competition partnering his brother Petros. They lost in the first round to Robin Haase and Hendrik Jebens.

Later in 2025, he also played at the Hellenic Championship, partnering again with his brother Petros. They lost in the first round to Vasil Kirkov and Bart Stevens. Tsitsipas also received a wildcard into the singles qualifiers, where he lost to Shintaro Mochizuki in the first round.

Tsitsipas won his first ATP Challenger title in doubles at the 2026 Crete Challenger III, partnering his brother, Petros, to defeat Alex Ganchev and Sacha Maes in the final.

He trains in Mallorca, Spain.

== Personal life ==
Tsitsipas was born to Apostolos Tsitsipas and Julia Salnikova. He is a younger brother of Stefanos Tsitsipas and Petros Tsitsipas.

== ATP Challenger Tour finals ==
=== Doubles: 1 (1 title) ===
Legend ATP Challenger Tour (1–0)	Finals by surface Hard (1–0)

Result	W–L	Date	Tournament	Tier	Surface	Partner	Opponents	Score
Win	1–0	Nov 2026	Crete Challenger III, Greece	Challenger	Hard	(Greece) Petros Tsitsipas	(Bulgaria) Alex Ganchev (Luxembourg) Sacha Maes	7–5, 7–6^{(7–4)}

== ITF Circuit finals ==
=== Doubles: 3 (2 titles, 1 runner-up) ===
Legend
$100,000 tournaments
$80,000 tournaments
$60,000 tournaments
$25,000 tournaments (0–5)
$15,000 tournaments (1–2)

Result	W–L	Date	Tournament	Tier	Surface	Partner	Opponents	Score
Loss	0–1	Nov 2023	ITF Heraklion, Greece	15,000	Hard	(Greece) Petros Tsitsipas	(Austria) Neil Oberleitner (Austria) Joel Schwärzler	6–7(4–7), 2–6
Win	1–1	Jul 2025	ITF Bucaramanga, Colombia	15,000	Clay	(Colombia) Miguel Tobón	(Brazil) Breno Braga (Brazil) Victor Braga	6–2, 6–3
Win	2–1	Nov 2025	ITF Heraklion, Greece	15,000	Hard	(Greece) Petros Tsitsipas	(South Africa) Vasilios Caripi (Greece) Dimitris Sakellaridis	4–6, 6–3, [12–10]
