= Jakub Menšík career statistics =

Career finals
Discipline	Type	Won	Lost	Total
Singles	Grand Slam	–	–	0
Singles	ATP Finals	–	–	0
Singles	ATP 1000	1	0	1
Singles	ATP 500	–	–	0
Singles	ATP 250	1	1	2
Singles	Olympics	–	–	0
Singles	Total	2	1	3
Doubles	Grand Slam	–	–	0
Doubles	ATP Finals	–	–	0
Doubles	ATP 1000	–	–	0
Doubles	ATP 500	–	–	0
Doubles	ATP 250	–	1	1
Doubles	Olympics	–	–	0
Doubles	Total	0	1	1
Mixed doubles	Grand Slam	1	–	1
Mixed doubles	Total	1	0	1

This is a list of the main career statistics of professional Czech tennis player Jakub Menšík.

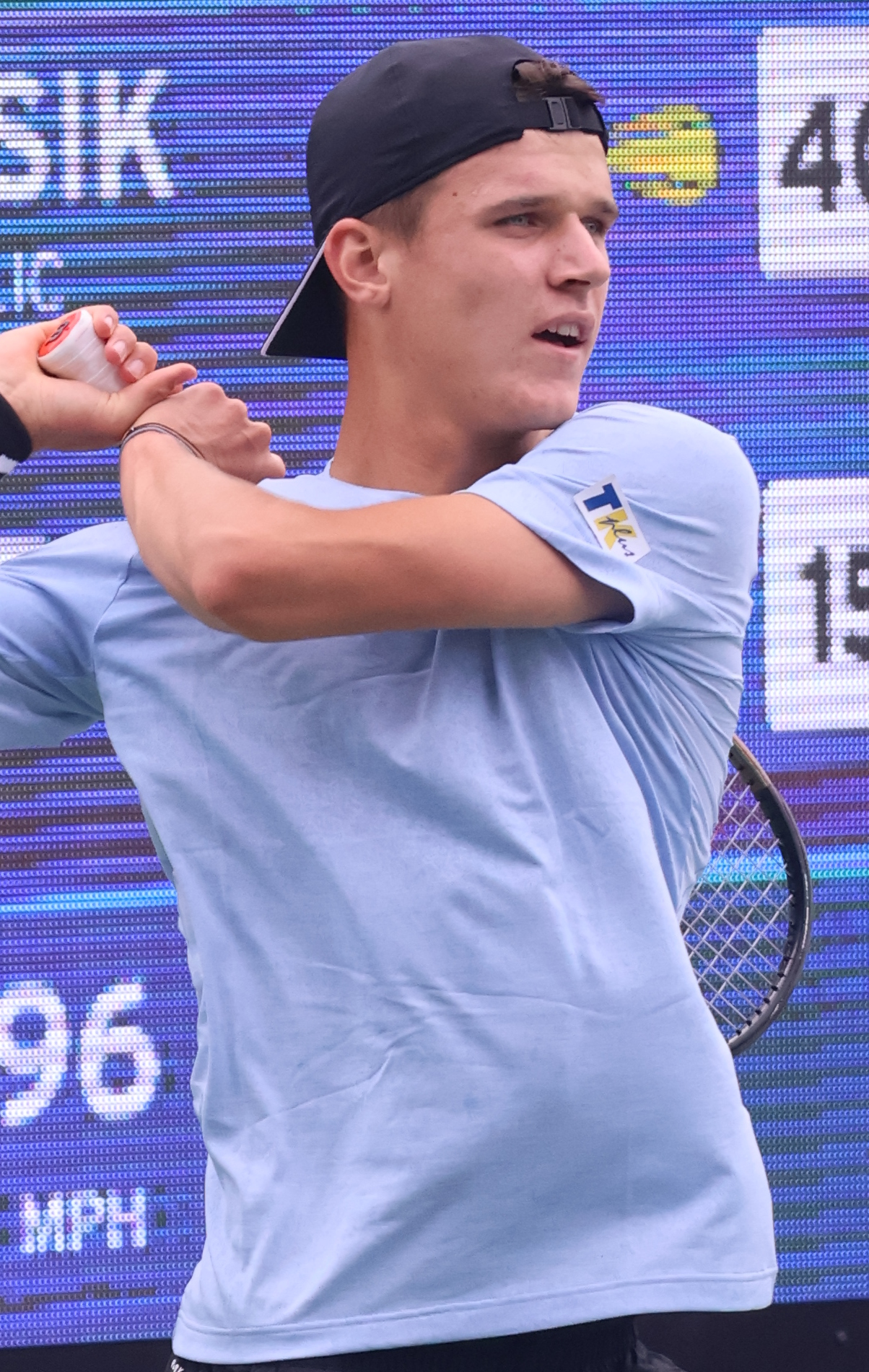
Menšík at the 2023 US Open

== Performance timeline ==
Key
W	F	SF	QF	#R	RR	Q#	P#	DNQ	A	Z#	PO	G	S	B	NMS	NTI	P	NH

(W) winner; (F) finalist; (SF) semifinalist; (QF) quarterfinalist; (#R) rounds 4, 3, 2, 1; (RR) round-robin stage; (Q#) qualification round; (P#) preliminary round; (DNQ) did not qualify; (A) absent; (Z#) Davis/Fed Cup Zonal Group (with number indication) or (PO) play-off; (G) gold, (S) silver or (B) bronze Olympic/Paralympic medal; (NMS) not a Masters tournament; (NTI) not a Tier I tournament; (P) postponed; (NH) not held; (SR) strike rate (events won / competed); (W–L) win–loss record.
To avoid confusion and double counting, these charts are updated at the conclusion of a tournament or when the player's participation has ended.

=== Singles ===
Current through the 2026 Vienna Open.

Tournament	2023	2024	2025	2026	SR	W–L	Win %
Grand Slam tournaments
Australian Open	A	2R	3R	4R (Note: Menšík withdrew from 2026 Australian Open.)	0 / 3	6–2	75%
French Open	A	A	2R	SF	0 / 2	6–2	75%
Wimbledon	A	1R	3R	2R	0 / 3	3–3	50%
US Open	3R	3R	2R	3R	0 / 3	7–4	63%
Win–Loss	2–1	3–3	6–4	11–3	0 / 11	22–11	67%
National representation
Davis Cup	QF	RR	QF		0 / 3	5–2	71%
Summer Olympics	NH	2R	Not Held		0 / 1	1–1	50%
ATP 1000 tournaments
Indian Wells Open	A	2R	2R	3R	0 / 3	3–3	50%
Miami Open	A	Q2	W	3R	1 / 2	7–1	88%
Monte-Carlo Masters	A	A	A	A	0 / 0	0–0	–
Madrid Open	A	3R	QF	4R	0 / 3	7–3	70%
Italian Open	A	1R	4R	2R	0 / 3	2–3	40%
Canadian Open	A	Q2	3R	QF	0 / 2	4–2	67%
Cincinnati Open	A	Q1	3R	4R	0 / 2	3–2	60%
Shanghai Masters	A	QF	2R	4R	0 / 3	6–3	67%
Paris Masters	A	Q2	A	A	0 / 0	0–0	–
Win–Loss	0–0	7–4	14–6	11–7	1 / 18	32–17	65%
Career statistics
	2023	2024	2025	2026	SR	W–L	Win %
Tournaments	1	16	20	18	Career total: 55		
Titles	0	0	1	1	Career total: 2		
Finals	0	1	1	1	Career total: 3		
Hard Win–Loss	3–1	17–12	23–13	27–14	2 / 34	70–40	64%
Clay Win–Loss	0–0	6–4	6–4	8–4	0 / 12	20–12	63%
Grass Win–Loss	0–0	2–4	4–3	1–2	0 / 9	7–9	44%
Overall Win–Loss	3–1	25–20	33–20	36–20	2 / 55	97–61	61%
Win %	75%	56%	62%	64%	Career total: 61%		
Year-end ranking	167	48	19		$8,423,265		

== Grand Slam tournaments finals ==
=== Mixed doubles: 1 (title) ===
Result	Year	Tournament	Surface	Partner	Opponents	Score
Win	2026	US Open	Hard	(Czech Republic) Karolína Muchová	(Switzerland) Belinda Bencic (Italy) Flavio Cobolli	6–3, 1–6, [10–6]

== Other significant finals ==
=== ATP 1000 tournaments ===
==== Singles: 1 (title) ====
Result	Year	Tournament	Surface	Opponent	Score
Win	2025	Miami Open	Hard	(Serbia) Novak Djokovic	7–6^{(7–4)}, 7–6^{(7–4)}

== ATP Tour finals ==
=== Singles: 3 (2 titles, 1 runner-up) ===
Legend ATP 1000 (1–0) ATP 250 (1–1)	Finals by surface Hard (2–1)	Finals by setting Outdoor (2–1)

Result	W–L	Date	Tournament	Tier	Surface	Opponent	Score
Loss	0–1	Feb 2024	Qatar Open, Qatar	ATP 250	Hard	Karen Khachanov	6–7^{(12–14)}, 4–6
Win	1–1	Mar 2025	Miami Open, United States	ATP 1000	Hard	(Serbia) Novak Djokovic	7–6^{(7–4)}, 7–6^{(7–4)}
Win	2–1	Jan 2026	Auckland Open, New Zealand	ATP 250	Hard	(Argentina) Sebastián Báez	6–3, 7–6^{(9–7)}

=== Doubles: 1 (runner-up) ===
Legend ATP 250 (0–1)	Finals by surface Hard (0–1)	Finals by setting Outdoor (0–1)

Result	Date	Tournament	Tier	Surface	Partner	Opponents	Score
Loss	Jan 2025	Brisbane International, Australia	ATP 250	Hard	(Czech Republic) Jiří Lehečka	(United Kingdom) Julian Cash (United Kingdom) Lloyd Glasspool	3–6, 7–6^{(7–2)}, [6–10]

== ATP Challenger Tour finals ==
=== Singles: 2 (1 title, 1 runner-up) ===
Legend ATP Challenger (1–1)

Result	W–L	Date	Tournament	Surface	Opponent	Score
Win	1–0	May 2023	Prague Open, Czech Republic	Clay	(Germany) Dominik Koepfer	6–4, 6–3
Loss	1–1	Jan 2024	Canberra International, Australia	Hard	(Germany) Dominik Koepfer	3–6, 2–6

== ITF World Tennis Tour finals ==
=== Singles: 5 (5 titles) ===
Legend M25 tournaments (2–0) M15 tournaments (3–0)	Finals by surface Hard (4–0) Clay (1–0)

Result	W–L	Date	Tournament	Surface	Opponent	Score
Win	1–0	Sep 2022	M15 Allershausen, Germany	Clay	(Germany) Peter Heller	7–5, 3–6, 6–1
Win	2–0	Nov 2022	M25 Heraklion, Greece	Hard	(Ukraine) Oleksandr Ovcharenko	6–4, 7–6^{(7–4)}
Win	3–0	Nov 2022	M15 Sharm El Sheikh, Egypt	Hard	(Georgia (country)) Saba Purtseladze	6–4, 6–2
Win	4–0	Dec 2022	M15 Sharm El Sheikh, Egypt	Hard	(Germany) Robert Strombachs	6–4, 6–0
Win	5–0	Apr 2023	M25 Trnava, Slovakia	Hard (i)	(Sweden) Karl Friberg	7–6^{(8–6)}, 6–3

=== Doubles: 1 (title) ===
Legend M15 tournaments (1–0)

Result	Date	Tournament	Surface	Partner	Opponents	Score
Win	Jun 2022	M15 Bytom, Poland	Clay	(Poland) Olaf Pieczkowski	(Australia) Matthew Romios (Australia) Brandon Walkin	7–6^{(7–3)}, 7–5

== Junior Grand Slam finals ==
=== Singles: 1 (runner-up) ===
Result	Year	Tournament	Surface	Opponent	Score
Loss	2022	Australian Open	Hard	(United States) Bruno Kuzuhara	6–7^{(4–7)}, 7–6^{(8–6)}, 5–7

== Wins against top 10 players ==
- Menšík has a 11–12 record against players who were, at the time the match was played, ranked in the top 10.

No.	Player	Rk	Event	Surface	Rd	Score	Rk	Years	Ref
1	Andrey Rublev (Note: Russian and Belarusian players are not allowed to compete under the name or flag of their country following the Russian invasion of Ukraine.)	5	Qatar Open, Qatar	Hard	QF	6–4, 7–6^{(8–6)}	116	2024	
2	(Bulgaria) Grigor Dimitrov	10	Madrid Open, Spain	Clay	2R	6–2, 6–7^{(4–7)}, 6–3	74	2024	
3	Andrey Rublev	6	Shanghai Masters, China	Hard	2R	6–7^{(7–9)}, 6–4, 6–3	65	2024	
4	(Bulgaria) Grigor Dimitrov	10	Shanghai Masters, China	Hard	4R	6–3, 3–6, 6–4	65	2024	
5	(Norway) Casper Ruud	6	Australian Open, Australia	Hard	2R	6–2, 3–6, 6–1, 6–4	48	2025	
6	(United Kingdom) Jack Draper	7	Miami Open, United States	Hard	2R	7–6^{(7–2)}, 7–6^{(7–3)}	54	2025	
7	(United States) Taylor Fritz	4	Miami Open, United States	Hard	SF	7–6^{(7–4)}, 4–6, 7–6^{(7–4)}	54	2025	
8	(Serbia) Novak Djokovic	5	Miami Open, United States	Hard	F	7–6^{(7–4)}, 7–6^{(7–4)}	54	2025	
9	(Italy) Jannik Sinner	2	Qatar Open, Qatar	Hard	QF	7–6^{(7–3)}, 2–6, 6–3	16	2026	
10	(Australia) Alex de Minaur	7	French Open, France	Clay	3R	0–6, 6–2, 6–2, 6–3	27	2026	
11	(United States) Ben Shelton	4	Davis Cup, Czech Republic	Hard (i)	Q2	5–7, 6–4, 6–3	15	2026	

- Key: (Rk) first use, opponent rank; (Rd) round; (Rk) 2nd use, player rank; (Ref) reference; (F) final; (SF) semifinal; (QF) quarterfinal; (#R) rounds 4, 3, 2, 1; (RR) round-robin stage; (Q#) qualifying rounds or stages (3), 2, 1.

*As of 29 May 2026

== Exhibition matches ==
=== Singles ===
Result	Date	Tournament	Surface	Opponent	Score
Loss	June 2026	The Boodles Tennis Challenge, Stoke Poges, Buckinghamshire, United Kingdom	Grass	(France) Arthur Fils	5–7, 6–5, 10–8
Win	June 2026	The Boodles Tennis Challenge, Stoke Poges, Buckinghamshire, United Kingdom	Grass	(Poland) Hubert Hurkacz	7–6(6), 0–6, 11–9
