= 2023 Sparta Prague Open – Doubles =

Doubles
- 2023 Sparta Prague Open

Final
- Champions: (France) Dan Added (France) Albano Olivetti
- Runners-up: (Latvia) Miķelis Lībietis (United States) Hunter Reese
- Score: 6–4, 6–3

Events
Singles	Doubles
- Sparta Prague Open

Francisco Cabral and Szymon Walków were the defending champions but chose not to defend their title.

Dan Added and Albano Olivetti won the title after defeating Miķelis Lībietis and Hunter Reese 6–4, 6–3 in the final.

== Seeds ==
1. (Kazakhstan) Andrey Golubev / (Czech Republic) Roman Jebavý (first round)
2. (Argentina) Guido Andreozzi / (Argentina) Guillermo Durán (quarterfinals)
3. (France) Dan Added / (France) Albano Olivetti (champions)
4. (France) Jonathan Eysseric / (Pakistan) Aisam-ul-Haq Qureshi (first round)

== Draw ==
Key

- Q = Qualifier
- WC = Wild card
- LL = Lucky loser
- Alt = Alternate
- ITF = ITF entry
- PR = Protected ranking
- SR = Special ranking
- SE = Special exempt
- JE = Junior exempt
- JR = Junior Accelerator Programme entrant
- CO = College Accelerator Programme entrant
- NG = Next Gen Accelerator Program entrant
- w/o = Walkover
- r = Retired
- d = Defaulted

First round
1	(Kazakhstan) A Golubev (Czech Republic) R Jebavý	4	0
WC	(Czech Republic) H Bartoň (Czech Republic) J Menšík	6	6
(Czech Republic) Z Kolář (Czech Republic) A Pavlásek	6	6
(Spain) S Martos Gornés (Ukraine) D Molchanov	2	3
4	(France) J Eysseric (Pakistan) A-u-H Qureshi	6^{5}	2
(Latvia) M Lībietis (United States) H Reese	7^{7}	6
WC	(Czech Republic) P Rikl (Czech Republic) M Vrbenský	2	3
(Czech Republic) P Nouza (Czech Republic) A Paulson	6	6
(United States) C Harrison (Japan) S Mochizuki	5	6^{7}
(United Kingdom) L Johnson (Netherlands) S Verbeek	7	7^{9}
(Ukraine) V Manafov (Slovakia) I Zelenay	3	7	[2]
3	(France) D Added (France) A Olivetti	6	5	[10]
(Czech Republic) M Gengel (Ukraine) V Sachko	7	7
(Kazakhstan) G Lomakin (Ukraine) O Prihodko	5	5
(Bosnia and Herzegovina) D Džumhur (Bosnia and Herzegovina) N Fatić	4	6	[8]
2	(Argentina) G Andreozzi (Argentina) G Durán	6	4	[10]

Quarterfinals
WC	(Czech Republic) H Bartoň (Czech Republic) J Menšík	6	6
(Czech Republic) Z Kolář (Czech Republic) A Pavlásek	4	4
(Latvia) M Lībietis (United States) H Reese	6	7^{7}
(Czech Republic) P Nouza (Czech Republic) A Paulson	3	6^{3}
(United Kingdom) L Johnson (Netherlands) S Verbeek	3	4
3	(France) D Added (France) A Olivetti	6	6
(Czech Republic) M Gengel (Ukraine) V Sachko	6^{5}	7	[10]
2	(Argentina) G Andreozzi (Argentina) G Durán	7^{7}	5	[7]

Semifinals
WC	(Czech Republic) H Bartoň (Czech Republic) J Menšík	3	4
(Latvia) M Lībietis (United States) H Reese	6	6
3	(France) D Added (France) A Olivetti	6	6
(Czech Republic) M Gengel (Ukraine) V Sachko	2	4

Final
(Latvia) M Lībietis (United States) H Reese	4	3
3	(France) D Added (France) A Olivetti	6	6
