= 2021 TK Sparta Prague Open – Doubles =

Doubles
- 2021 TK Sparta Prague Open

Final
- Champions: (Czech Republic) Jonáš Forejtek (Czech Republic) Michael Vrbenský
- Runners-up: (Russia) Evgeny Karlovskiy (Russia) Evgenii Tiurnev
- Score: 6–1, 6–4

Events
Singles	Doubles
- Sparta Prague Open

Tomasz Bednarek and Nikola Mektić were the defending champions but chose not to defend their title.

Jonáš Forejtek and Michael Vrbenský won the title after defeating Evgeny Karlovskiy and Evgenii Tiurnev 6–1, 6–4 in the final.

== Seeds ==
1. (India) Sriram Balaji / (India) Arjun Kadhe (first round)
2. (Portugal) Gonçalo Oliveira / (Croatia) Nino Serdarušić (semifinals)
3. (Spain) Carlos Gómez-Herrera / (Netherlands) Mark Vervoort (quarterfinals)
4. (Argentina) Facundo Mena / (Argentina) Camilo Ugo Carabelli (quarterfinals)

== Draw ==
Key

- Q = Qualifier
- WC = Wild card
- LL = Lucky loser
- Alt = Alternate
- ITF = ITF entry
- PR = Protected ranking
- SR = Special ranking
- SE = Special exempt
- JE = Junior exempt
- JR = Junior Accelerator Programme entrant
- CO = College Accelerator Programme entrant
- NG = Next Gen Accelerator Program entrant
- w/o = Walkover
- r = Retired
- d = Defaulted

First round
1	(India) S Balaji (India) A Kadhe	4	4
Alt	(Russia) Yan Bondarevskiy (Ukraine) O Prihodko	6	6
WC	(Czech Republic) A Paulson (Czech Republic) Robin Staněk	3	6	[4]
(Italy) F Baldi (Italy) M Bortolotti	6	2	[10]
4	(Argentina) F Mena (Argentina) C Ugo Carabelli	6	7
WC	(Czech Republic) M Krumich (Czech Republic) D Svrčina	3	5
(Russia) E Karlovskiy (Russia) E Tiurnev	6	7
(Netherlands) I Sijsling (Netherlands) G Smits	3	5
(Czech Republic) J Forejtek (Czech Republic) M Vrbenský	6	6
WC	(Czech Republic) Victor Sklenka (Czech Republic) Kryštof Zapský	3	2
(Italy) R Bonadio (France) E Furness	4	3
3	(Spain) C Gómez-Herrera (Netherlands) M Vervoort	6	6
(Italy) F Agamenone (Poland) P Matuszewski	4	6^{6}
(Belarus) U Ignatik (Romania) FC Jianu	6	7^{8}
(Bulgaria) A Andreev (Czech Republic) M Gengel	6^{5}	6^{4}
2	(Portugal) G Oliveira (Croatia) N Serdarušić	7^{7}	7^{7}

Quarterfinals
Alt	(Russia) Y Bondarevskiy (Ukraine) O Prihodko	3	6	[6]
(Italy) F Baldi (Italy) M Bortolotti	6	3	[10]
4	(Argentina) F Mena (Argentina) C Ugo Carabelli	4	5
(Russia) E Karlovskiy (Russia) E Tiurnev	6	7
(Czech Republic) J Forejtek (Czech Republic) M Vrbenský	6	7
3	(Spain) C Gómez-Herrera (Netherlands) M Vervoort	3	5
(Belarus) U Ignatik (Romania) FC Jianu	3	4
2	(Portugal) G Oliveira (Croatia) N Serdarušić	6	6

Semifinals
(Italy) F Baldi (Italy) M Bortolotti
(Russia) E Karlovskiy (Russia) E Tiurnev	w/o
(Czech Republic) J Forejtek (Czech Republic) M Vrbenský	6	7^{7}
2	(Portugal) G Oliveira (Croatia) N Serdarušić	1	6^{4}

Final
(Russia) E Karlovskiy (Russia) E Tiurnev	1	4
(Czech Republic) J Forejtek (Czech Republic) M Vrbenský	6	6
