= 2022 Sparta Prague Open – Singles =

Singles
- 2022 Sparta Prague Open

Final
- Champion: (Austria) Sebastian Ofner
- Runner-up: (Czech Republic) Dalibor Svrčina
- Score: 6–0, 6–4

Events
Singles	Doubles
- Sparta Prague Open Challenger

Dalibor Svrčina was the defending champion but lost in the final to Sebastian Ofner.

Ofner won the title after defeating Svrčina 6–0, 6–4 in the final which was characterized by bad rainy weather to the point it was interrupted on 4–0 in favor of Ofner and concluded on indoor hard courts.

== Seeds ==
1. (Germany) Daniel Altmaier (second round)
2. (Germany) Mats Moraing (second round)
3. (Chinese Taipei) Tseng Chun-hsin (semifinals)
4. (France) Lucas Pouille (first round)
5. (Austria) Dennis Novak (second round)
6. (Czech Republic) Tomáš Macháč (semifinals, withdrew)
7. (Czech Republic) Vít Kopřiva (withdrew)
8. (Austria) Jurij Rodionov (second round)
9. (Kazakhstan) Dmitry Popko (first round)

== Draw ==
Key

- Q = Qualifier
- WC = Wild card
- LL = Lucky loser
- Alt = Alternate
- ITF = ITF entry
- PR = Protected ranking
- SR = Special ranking
- SE = Special exempt
- JE = Junior exempt
- JR = Junior Accelerator Programme entrant
- CO = College Accelerator Programme entrant
- NG = Next Gen Accelerator Program entrant
- w/o = Walkover
- r = Retired
- d = Defaulted

=== Finals ===
Semifinals
(Austria) Sebastian Ofner	7	1	6
3	(Chinese Taipei) Tseng Chun-hsin	5	6	1
(Czech Republic) Dalibor Svrčina	w/o
6	(Czech Republic) Tomáš Macháč

Final
(Austria) Sebastian Ofner	6	6
(Czech Republic) Dalibor Svrčina	0	4

=== Top half ===
First round
1	(Germany) D Altmaier	5	7	6
WC	(Czech Republic) M Krumich	7	5	4
WC	(Czech Republic) J Forejtek	6	6^{5}	6
Q	E Tiurnev	3	7^{7}	4
(Austria) S Ofner	6	6
(France) C Lestienne	2	2
(Netherlands) R Haase	1	4
8	(Austria) J Rodionov	6	6
3	(Chinese Taipei) C-h Tseng	6	6
Q	(Spain) A Moro Cañas	4	4
Q	(Austria) L Miedler	2	6	6
LL	(France) T Lamasine	6	2	3
Alt	(Portugal) J Domingues	2	6	2
Alt	(Spain) J Barranco Cosano	6	1	6
E Karlovskiy	6^{4}	7^{8}	4
5	(Austria) D Novak	7^{7}	6^{6}	6

Second round
1	(Germany) D Altmaier	1	4
WC	(Czech Republic) J Forejtek	6	6
(Austria) S Ofner	6	7^{8}
8	(Austria) J Rodionov	1	6^{6}
3	(Chinese Taipei) C-h Tseng	6	6
Q	(Austria) L Miedler	2	2
Alt	(Spain) J Barranco Cosano	7^{11}	2	6
5	(Austria) D Novak	6^{9}	6	3

Quarterfinals
WC	(Czech Republic) J Forejtek	2	6^{5}
(Austria) S Ofner	6	7^{7}
3	(Chinese Taipei) C-h Tseng	2	6	7^{7}
Alt	(Spain) J Barranco Cosano	6	3	6^{3}

Semifinals
(Austria) S Ofner	7	1	6
3	(Chinese Taipei) C-h Tseng	5	6	1

=== Bottom half ===
First round
9	(Kazakhstan) D Popko	4	1
Q	(Ukraine) O Krutykh	6	6
(Czech Republic) D Svrčina	6	6
Q	(Romania) ND Ionel	3	4
(Italy) L Giustino	6	6
(United Kingdom) R Peniston	2	3
Q	(United States) Em Nava	6	6
4	(France) L Pouille	3	1
6	(Czech Republic) T Macháč	6	3
WC	(Czech Republic) M Vrbenský	3	1^{r}
Alt	(France) E Furness	6	3
(France) A Müller	2	0^{r}
(Czech Republic) L Rosol	7^{7}	6
(Slovakia) F Horanský	6^{5}	1
(Germany) M Marterer	4	6	6^{11}
2	(Germany) M Moraing	6	3	7^{13}

Second round
Q	(Ukraine) O Krutykh	3	4
(Czech Republic) D Svrčina	6	6
(Italy) L Giustino	5	7^{7}	7^{7}
Q	(United States) Em Nava	7	6^{5}	6^{4}
6	(Czech Republic) T Macháč	3	7^{7}	6
Alt	(France) E Furness	6	6^{5}	4
(Czech Republic) L Rosol	4	6	6
2	(Germany) M Moraing	6	3	4

Quarterfinals
(Czech Republic) D Svrčina	6	4
(Italy) L Giustino	0	1^{r}
6	(Czech Republic) T Macháč	7^{7}	6
(Czech Republic) L Rosol	6^{3}	0

Semifinals
(Czech Republic) D Svrčina	w/o
6	(Czech Republic) T Macháč
