= 2023 Sparta Prague Open – Singles =

Singles
- 2023 Sparta Prague Open

Final
- Champion: (Czech Republic) Jakub Menšík
- Runner-up: (Germany) Dominik Koepfer
- Score: 6–4, 6–3

Events
Singles	Doubles
- Sparta Prague Open

Sebastian Ofner was the defending champion but chose not to defend his title.

Jakub Menšík won the title after defeating Dominik Koepfer 6–4, 6–3 in the final.

== Seeds ==
1. (Moldova) Radu Albot (first round)
2. (Switzerland) Dominic Stricker (first round)
3. (Slovakia) Norbert Gombos (second round)
4. (Slovakia) Lukáš Klein (quarterfinals)
5. (France) Enzo Couacaud (first round)
6. (Germany) Dominik Koepfer (final)
7. (Bosnia and Herzegovina) Damir Džumhur (first round)
8. (Chinese Taipei) Tseng Chun-hsin (first round)

== Draw ==
Key

- Q = Qualifier
- WC = Wild card
- LL = Lucky loser
- Alt = Alternate
- ITF = ITF entry
- PR = Protected ranking
- SR = Special ranking
- SE = Special exempt
- JE = Junior exempt
- JR = Junior Accelerator Programme entrant
- CO = College Accelerator Programme entrant
- NG = Next Gen Accelerator Program entrant
- w/o = Walkover
- r = Retired
- d = Defaulted

=== Finals ===
Semifinals
WC	(Czech Republic) Jakub Menšík	6	7
Alt	(Spain) Alejandro Moro Cañas	2	5
6	(Germany) Dominik Koepfer	6	6
(Argentina) Nicolás Kicker	4	3

Final
WC	(Czech Republic) Jakub Menšík	6	6
6	(Germany) Dominik Koepfer	4	3

=== Top half ===
First round
1	(Moldova) R Albot	6^{4}	6	3
WC	(Czech Republic) J Menšík	7^{7}	4	6
(Belgium) M Geerts	1	1
LL	(Ukraine) V Sachko	6	6
Alt	(Italy) F Gaio	2	4
(Dominican Republic) N Hardt	6	6
Q	(Australia) A Santillan	6	6
8	(Chinese Taipei) C-h Tseng	3	0
3	(Slovakia) N Gombos	6	6
Q	(Germany) R Molleker	4	4
(Japan) S Mochizuki	7	6
WC	(Czech Republic) M Vrbenský	5	3
Alt	(Spain) A Moro Cañas	6	3	6
Q	(United Kingdom) B Harris	2	6	0
(United States) Z Svajda	6	6
5	(France) E Couacaud	4	1

Second round
WC	(Czech Republic) J Menšík	6	6
LL	(Ukraine) V Sachko	4	4
(Dominican Republic) N Hardt	6	4	3
Q	(Australia) A Santillan	4	6	6
3	(Slovakia) N Gombos	6^{8}	6^{2}
(Japan) S Mochizuki	7^{10}	7^{7}
Alt	(Spain) A Moro Cañas	6	2	6
(United States) Z Svajda	4	6	4

Quarterfinals
WC	(Czech Republic) J Menšík	3	6	7^{8}
Q	(Australia) A Santillan	6	3	6^{6}
(Japan) S Mochizuki	3	4
Alt	(Spain) A Moro Cañas	6	6

Semifinals
WC	(Czech Republic) J Menšík	6	7
Alt	(Spain) A Moro Cañas	2	5

=== Bottom half ===
First round
6	(Germany) D Koepfer	1
Q	(Portugal) G Elias	1^{r}
(Czech Republic) Z Kolář	4	3
(France) E Furness	6	6
Q	(Argentina) G Andreozzi	6	6
Q	(Spain) D Rincón	4	4
Y Demin	5	1
4	(Slovakia) L Klein	7	6
7	(Bosnia and Herzegovina) D Džumhur	3	6^{3}
(Argentina) N Kicker	6	7^{7}
(France) D Added	7	4	3
Alt	(Bosnia and Herzegovina) N Fatić	5	6	6
WC	(Czech Republic) J Veselý	4	5
(Spain) P Llamas Ruiz	6	7
(Switzerland) H Laaksonen	7	4	6
2	(Switzerland) D Stricker	5	6	1

Second round
6	(Germany) D Koepfer	7^{8}	0
(France) E Furness	6^{6}	0^{r}
Q	(Argentina) G Andreozzi	7	3	3
4	(Slovakia) L Klein	5	6	6
(Argentina) N Kicker	7	6
Alt	(Bosnia and Herzegovina) N Fatić	5	4
(Spain) P Llamas Ruiz	3	7^{8}	2
(Switzerland) H Laaksonen	6	6^{6}	6

Quarterfinals
6	(Germany) D Koepfer	6	6^{6}	6
4	(Slovakia) L Klein	4	7^{8}	1
(Argentina) N Kicker	w/o
(Switzerland) H Laaksonen

Semifinals
6	(Germany) D Koepfer	6	6
(Argentina) N Kicker	4	3
