= 2021 TK Sparta Prague Open – Singles =

Singles
- 2021 TK Sparta Prague Open

Final
- Champion: (Czech Republic) Dalibor Svrčina
- Runner-up: (Kazakhstan) Dmitry Popko
- Score: 6–0, 7–5

Events
Singles	Doubles
- Sparta Prague Open Challenger

Adam Pavlásek was the defending champion but chose not to defend his title.

Dalibor Svrčina won the title after defeating Dmitry Popko 6–0, 7–5 in the final.

== Seeds ==
1. (Serbia) Nikola Milojević (quarterfinals)
2. (Kazakhstan) Dmitry Popko (final)
3. (Italy) Lorenzo Giustino (second round)
4. (Argentina) Facundo Mena (semifinals)
5. (Chile) Nicolás Jarry (first round)
6. (Italy) Riccardo Bonadio (quarterfinals)
7. (Spain) Adrián Menéndez Maceiras (second round)
8. (Czech Republic) Michael Vrbenský (first round)

== Draw ==
Key

- Q = Qualifier
- WC = Wild card
- LL = Lucky loser
- Alt = Alternate
- ITF = ITF entry
- PR = Protected ranking
- SR = Special ranking
- SE = Special exempt
- JE = Junior exempt
- JR = Junior Accelerator Programme entrant
- CO = College Accelerator Programme entrant
- NG = Next Gen Accelerator Program entrant
- w/o = Walkover
- r = Retired
- d = Defaulted

=== Finals ===
Semifinals
(Czech Republic) Jonáš Forejtek	5	4
WC	(Czech Republic) Dalibor Svrčina	7	6
4	(Argentina) Facundo Mena	1	2
2	(Kazakhstan) Dmitry Popko	6	6

Final
WC	(Czech Republic) Dalibor Svrčina	6	7
2	(Kazakhstan) Dmitry Popko	0	5

=== Top half ===
First round
1	(Serbia) N Milojević	6^{2}	6	6
(Italy) A Arnaboldi	7^{7}	0	1
Q	(France) G Blancaneaux	6	6
(United States) A Ritschard	1	3
(Romania) FC Jianu	6	6
(United States) JC Aragone	0	2
(Czech Republic) J Forejtek	4	6	6
5	(Chile) N Jarry	6	4	2
3	(Italy) L Giustino	7^{7}	6
(Russia) E Karlovskiy	6^{4}	2
(France) E Furness	4	6	6
WC	(Czech Republic) M Krumich	6	4	3
(Kazakhstan) T Skatov	3	2
WC	(Czech Republic) D Svrčina	6	6
(Italy) F Baldi	3	6^{2}
7	(Spain) A Menéndez Maceiras	6	7^{7}

Second round
1	(Serbia) N Milojević	3	6	3
Q	(France) G Blancaneaux	6	3	1^{r}
(Romania) FC Jianu	2	6	1
(Czech Republic) J Forejtek	6	4	6
3	(Italy) L Giustino	6^{4}	6	3
(France) E Furness	7^{7}	4	6
WC	(Czech Republic) D Svrčina	6^{5}	6	6
7	(Spain) A Menéndez Maceiras	7^{7}	1	4

Quarterfinals
1	(Serbia) N Milojević	4	3
(Czech Republic) J Forejtek	6	6
(France) E Furness	5	7	4
WC	(Czech Republic) D Svrčina	7	5	6

Semifinals
(Czech Republic) J Forejtek	5	4
WC	(Czech Republic) D Svrčina	7	6

=== Bottom half ===
First round
8	(Czech Republic) M Vrbenský	4	2
(Russia) E Tiurnev	6	6
(Argentina) C Ugo Carabelli	1	6	6
Q	(Italy) F Agamenone	6	4	4
Q	(Bulgaria) A Andreev	3	3
(Croatia) N Serdarušić	6	6
(Austria) L Miedler	2	5
4	(Argentina) F Mena	6	7
6	(Italy) R Bonadio	6	2	6
(Germany) M Zverev	3	6	3
PR	(Austria) G Melzer	6	2	1
Q	(United States) E Nava	3	6	6
WC	(United States) T Kodat	3	1
(Portugal) G Oliveira	6	6
(Russia) A Vatutin	5	1
2	(Kazakhstan) D Popko	7	6

Second round
(Russia) E Tiurnev	3	4
(Argentina) C Ugo Carabelli	6	6
(Croatia) N Serdarušić	2	4
4	(Argentina) F Mena	6	6
6	(Italy) R Bonadio	6	6
Q	(United States) E Nava	4	3
(Portugal) G Oliveira	0	3
2	(Kazakhstan) D Popko	6	6

Quarterfinals
(Argentina) C Ugo Carabelli	3	7^{8}	1
4	(Argentina) F Mena	6	6^{6}	6
6	(Italy) R Bonadio	3	2
2	(Kazakhstan) D Popko	6	6

Semifinals
4	(Argentina) F Mena	1	2
2	(Kazakhstan) D Popko	6	6
