= 2022 Sparta Prague Open – Doubles =

Doubles
- 2022 Sparta Prague Open

Final
- Champions: (Portugal) Francisco Cabral (Poland) Szymon Walków
- Runners-up: (France) Tristan Lamasine (France) Lucas Pouille
- Score: 6–2, 7–6^{(14–12)}

Events
Singles	Doubles
- Sparta Prague Open Challenger

Jonáš Forejtek and Michael Vrbenský were the defending champions but chose not to defend their title.

Francisco Cabral and Szymon Walków won the title after defeating Tristan Lamasine and Lucas Pouille 6–2, 7–6^{(14–12)} in the final.

== Seeds ==
1. (Netherlands) Robin Haase / (Poland) Łukasz Kubot (quarterfinals)
2. (United Kingdom) Jonny O'Mara / (United Kingdom) Ken Skupski (semifinals)
3. (Austria) Alexander Erler / (Austria) Lucas Miedler (quarterfinals)
4. (Portugal) Francisco Cabral / (Poland) Szymon Walków (champions)

== Draw ==
Key

- Q = Qualifier
- WC = Wild card
- LL = Lucky loser
- Alt = Alternate
- ITF = ITF entry
- PR = Protected ranking
- SR = Special ranking
- SE = Special exempt
- JE = Junior exempt
- JR = Junior Accelerator Programme entrant
- CO = College Accelerator Programme entrant
- NG = Next Gen Accelerator Program entrant
- w/o = Walkover
- r = Retired
- d = Defaulted

First round
1	(Netherlands) R Haase (Poland) Ł Kubot	7^{7}	6
(Poland) K Drzewiecki (Poland) P Matuszewski	6^{5}	4
Alt	(France) E Furness (United Kingdom) R Peniston	6	6
(Uzbekistan) S Fayziev (Kazakhstan) G Lomakin	3	4
4	(Portugal) F Cabral (Poland) S Walków	6	7^{7}
(France) J Eysseric (Czech Republic) R Jebavý	4	6^{2}
Alt	(Czech Republic) M Gengel (Czech Republic) L Rosol	6^{3}	7^{7}	[6]
(United States) H Reese (Netherlands) S Verbeek	7^{7}	6^{4}	[10]
(Kazakhstan) D Popko (Chinese Taipei) C-h Tseng	1	4
(France) T Lamasine (France) L Pouille	6	6
(Philippines) R Gonzales (Indonesia) C Rungkat	7^{7}	3	[10]
3	(Austria) A Erler (Austria) L Miedler	6^{5}	6	[12]
WC	(Czech Republic) M Krumich (Czech Republic) A Paulson	3	5
(Germany) M Moraing (Austria) D Novak	6	7
(Czech Republic) A Pavlásek (Slovakia) I Zelenay	3	6^{1}
2	(United Kingdom) J O'Mara (United Kingdom) K Skupski	6	7^{7}

Quarterfinals
1	(Netherlands) R Haase (Poland) Ł Kubot	4	4
Alt	(France) E Furness (United Kingdom) R Peniston	6	6
4	(Portugal) F Cabral (Poland) S Walków	2	6	[10]
(United States) H Reese (Netherlands) S Verbeek	6	3	[6]
(France) T Lamasine (France) L Pouille	6	7^{7}
3	(Austria) A Erler (Austria) L Miedler	4	6^{3}
(Germany) M Moraing (Austria) D Novak	6	1	[4]
2	(United Kingdom) J O'Mara (United Kingdom) K Skupski	4	6	[10]

Semifinals
Alt	(France) E Furness (United Kingdom) R Peniston	2	3
4	(Portugal) F Cabral (Poland) S Walków	6	6
(France) T Lamasine (France) L Pouille	4	7^{9}	[10]
2	(United Kingdom) J O'Mara (United Kingdom) K Skupski	6	6^{7}	[5]

Final
4	(Portugal) F Cabral (Poland) S Walków	6	7^{14}
(France) T Lamasine (France) L Pouille	2	6^{12}
