= 2022 Sparta Prague Open =

- Date: 18–24 April
- Category: ATP Challenger Tour
- Surface: Clay
- Location: Prague, Czech Republic

Champions

Singles
- (Austria) Sebastian Ofner

Doubles
- (Portugal) Francisco Cabral / (Poland) Szymon Walków
- Sparta Prague Open Challenger

The 2022 Sparta Prague Open was a professional tennis tournament played on clay courts. It was part of the 2022 ATP Challenger Tour. It took place in Prague, Czech Republic between 18 and 24 April 2022.

== Singles main-draw entrants ==
=== Seeds ===
Country	Player	Rank^{1}	Seed
GER	Daniel Altmaier	67	1
GER	Mats Moraing	124	2
TPE	Tseng Chun-hsin	125	3
FRA	Lucas Pouille	138	4
AUT	Dennis Novak	146	5
CZE	Tomáš Macháč	152	6
~~CZE~~	~~Vít Kopřiva~~	~~163~~	~~7~~
AUT	Jurij Rodionov	167	8
KAZ	Dmitry Popko	173	9

- ^{1} Rankings as of 11 April 2022.

=== Other entrants ===
The following players received wildcards into the singles main draw:

- (Czech Republic) Jonáš Forejtek
- (Czech Republic) Martin Krumich
- (Czech Republic) Michael Vrbenský

The following players received entry into the singles main draw as alternates:

- (Spain) Javier Barranco Cosano
- (Portugal) João Domingues
- (France) Evan Furness

The following players received entry from the qualifying draw:

- (Ukraine) Oleksii Krutykh
- (Austria) Lucas Miedler
- (Spain) Alejandro Moro Cañas
- (United States) Emilio Nava
- (Romania) David Ionel
- Evgenii Tiurnev

The following players received entry as lucky losers:

- ~~(Germany) Tobias Kamke~~
- (France) Tristan Lamasine

== Champions ==
=== Singles ===
- (Austria) Sebastian Ofner def. (Czech Republic) Dalibor Svrčina 6–0, 6–4.

=== Doubles ===
- (Portugal) Francisco Cabral / (Poland) Szymon Walków def. (France) Tristan Lamasine / (France) Lucas Pouille 6–2, 7–6^{(14–12)}.
