= 2016 Sparta Prague Open – Doubles =

Doubles
- 2016 Sparta Prague Open

Final
- Champions: (Poland) Tomasz Bednarek (Croatia) Nikola Mektić
- Runners-up: (Czech Republic) Zdeněk Kolář (Czech Republic) Matěj Vocel
- Score: 6–4, 5–7, [10–7]

Events
Singles	Doubles
- Sparta Prague Open Challenger

Mateusz Kowalczyk and Igor Zelenay were the defending champions, but chose not to defend their title.

Tomasz Bednarek and Nikola Mektić won the title after defeating Zdeněk Kolář and Matěj Vocel 6–4, 5–7, [10–7] in the final.

== Seeds ==
1. (Chile) Julio Peralta / (Chile) Hans Podlipnik (quarterfinals)
2. (Netherlands) Sander Arends / (Austria) Tristan-Samuel Weissborn (first round)
3. (Kazakhstan) Andrey Golubev / (Austria) Julian Knowle (quarterfinals)
4. (Uruguay) Ariel Behar / (Brazil) Fabrício Neis (quarterfinals)

== Draw ==
Key

- Q = Qualifier
- WC = Wild card
- LL = Lucky loser
- Alt = Alternate
- ITF = ITF entry
- PR = Protected ranking
- SR = Special ranking
- SE = Special exempt
- JE = Junior exempt
- JR = Junior Accelerator Programme entrant
- CO = College Accelerator Programme entrant
- NG = Next Gen Accelerator Program entrant
- w/o = Walkover
- r = Retired
- d = Defaulted

First round
1	(Chile) J Peralta (Chile) H Podlipnik	3	6	[10]
(Chinese Taipei) C-p Hsieh (Chinese Taipei) T-h Yang	6	3	[5]
WC	(Czech Republic) Z Kolář (Czech Republic) M Vocel	4	6	[10]
(Belarus) U Ignatik (Slovakia) J Kovalík	6	4	[8]
3	(Kazakhstan) A Golubev (Austria) J Knowle	6	6
(Colombia) N Barrientos (Venezuela) LD Martínez	3	2
(Germany) N Langer (Austria) G Melzer	6	6
(Brazil) R Dutra Silva (Ecuador) G Lapentti	4	4
WC	(Czech Republic) Tomáš Papik (Czech Republic) P Rikl	5	6	[1]
(Poland) T Bednarek (Croatia) N Mektić	7	3	[10]
(Spain) O Roca Batalla (Estonia) J Zopp	3	6	[7]
4	(Uruguay) A Behar (Brazil) F Neis	6	3	[10]
(Czech Republic) L Dlouhý (Slovakia) A Martin	6	6
WC	(Czech Republic) D Kellovský (Czech Republic) J Pospíšil	2	2
(Czech Republic) R Jebavý (Czech Republic) J Šátral	6	6
2	(Netherlands) S Arends (Austria) T-S Weissborn	1	2

Quarterfinals
1	(Chile) J Peralta (Chile) H Podlipnik	3	6	[6]
WC	(Czech Republic) Z Kolář (Czech Republic) M Vocel	6	1	[10]
3	(Kazakhstan) A Golubev (Austria) J Knowle	5	6	[5]
(Germany) N Langer (Austria) G Melzer	7	3	[10]
(Poland) T Bednarek (Croatia) N Mektić	3	7	[10]
4	(Uruguay) A Behar (Brazil) F Neis	6	5	[3]
(Czech Republic) L Dlouhý (Slovakia) A Martin	7^{7}	2	[6]
(Czech Republic) R Jebavý (Czech Republic) J Šátral	6^{5}	6	[10]

Semifinals
WC	(Czech Republic) Z Kolář (Czech Republic) M Vocel	5	6	[10]
(Germany) N Langer (Austria) G Melzer	7	2	[8]
(Poland) T Bednarek (Croatia) N Mektić	6	6
(Czech Republic) R Jebavý (Czech Republic) J Šátral	4	4

Final
WC	(Czech Republic) Z Kolář (Czech Republic) M Vocel	4	7	[7]
(Poland) T Bednarek (Croatia) N Mektić	6	5	[10]
