= 2023 Sparta Prague Open =

- Date: 8–14 May
- Category: ATP Challenger Tour
- Surface: Clay
- Location: Prague, Czech Republic

Champions

Singles
- (Czech Republic) Jakub Menšík

Doubles
- (France) Dan Added / (France) Albano Olivetti
- Sparta Prague Open Challenger

The 2023 Sparta Prague Open was a professional tennis tournament played on clay courts. It was part of the 2023 ATP Challenger Tour. It took place in Prague, Czech Republic between 8 and 14 May 2023.

== Singles main-draw entrants ==
=== Seeds ===
Country	Player	Rank^{1}	Seed
MDA	Radu Albot	103	1
SUI	Dominic Stricker	129	2
SVK	Norbert Gombos	134	3
SVK	Lukáš Klein	143	4
FRA	Enzo Couacaud	153	5
GER	Dominik Koepfer	158	6
BIH	Damir Džumhur	186	7
TPE	Tseng Chun-hsin	193	8

- ^{1} Rankings as of 24 April 2023.

=== Other entrants ===
The following players received wildcards into the singles main draw:

- (Czech Republic) Jakub Menšík
- (Czech Republic) Jiří Veselý
- (Czech Republic) Michael Vrbenský

The following players received entry into the singles main draw as alternates:

- (Bosnia and Herzegovina) Nerman Fatić
- (Italy) Federico Gaio
- (Spain) Alejandro Moro Cañas
- (Poland) ~~Kacper Żuk~~

The following players received entry from the qualifying draw:

- (Argentina) Guido Andreozzi
- (Portugal) Gastão Elias
- (United Kingdom) Billy Harris
- (Germany) Rudolf Molleker
- (Spain) Daniel Rincón
- (Australia) Akira Santillan

The following player received entry as a lucky loser:

- (Ukraine) Vitaliy Sachko

== Champions ==
=== Singles ===
- (Czech Republic) Jakub Menšík def. (Germany) Dominik Koepfer 6–4, 6–3.

=== Doubles ===
- (France) Dan Added / (France) Albano Olivetti def. (Latvia) Miķelis Lībietis / (United States) Hunter Reese 6–4, 6–3.
