= 2014 Prague Open – Singles =

Singles
- 2014 Prague Open

Final
- Champion: (Czech Republic) Lukáš Rosol
- Runner-up: (Czech Republic) Jiří Veselý
- Score: 3–6, 6–4, 6–4

Events
Singles	Doubles
- Prague Open

This was the first edition of the tournament.

Lukáš Rosol eventually won the title, defeating Jiří Veselý in the final, 3–6, 6–4, 6–4.

== Seeds ==
1. (Czech Republic) Lukáš Rosol (champion)
2. (Czech Republic) Jiří Veselý (final)
3. (Kazakhstan) Aleksandr Nedovyesov (first round)
4. (Canada) Peter Polansky (first round)
5. (Czech Republic) Jan Hájek (withdrew)
6. (Spain) Adrián Menéndez-Maceiras (second round)
7. (Italy) Matteo Viola (second round)
8. (Spain) Roberto Carballés Baena (first round)

== Draw ==
Key

- Q = Qualifier
- WC = Wild card
- LL = Lucky loser
- Alt = Alternate
- ITF = ITF entry
- PR = Protected ranking
- SR = Special ranking
- SE = Special exempt
- JE = Junior exempt
- JR = Junior Accelerator Programme entrant
- CO = College Accelerator Programme entrant
- NG = Next Gen Accelerator Program entrant
- w/o = Walkover
- r = Retired
- d = Defaulted

=== Finals ===
Semifinals
1/WC	(Czech Republic) Lukáš Rosol	4	6	6
Q	(Switzerland) Michael Lammer	6	1	1
(China) Zhang Ze	3	3
2	(Czech Republic) Jiří Veselý	6	6

Final
1/WC	(Czech Republic) Lukáš Rosol	3	6	6
2	(Czech Republic) Jiří Veselý	6	4	4

=== Top half ===
First round
1/WC	(Czech Republic) L Rosol	6	6
Q	(Italy) A Giannessi	2	2
(Spain) J Samper Montaña	2	6	6
(Republic of Ireland) L Sorensen	6	3	4
(Italy) L Giustino	6	7^{10}
(Spain) J Checa-Calvo	2	6^{8}
Q	(Czech Republic) M Michalička	3	4
6	(Spain) A Menéndez-Maceiras	6	6
4	(Canada) P Polansky	6^{5}	2
(Switzerland) H Laaksonen	7^{7}	6
Q	(Italy) R Marcora	6	6
(Czech Republic) J Pospíšil	4	3
(Czech Republic) Pavel Staubert	0	0
Q	(Switzerland) M Lammer	6	6
(Italy) S Vagnozzi	1	2
7	(Italy) M Viola	6	6

Second round
1/WC	(Czech Republic) L Rosol	6	6^{5}	6
(Spain) J Samper Montaña	1	7^{7}	4
(Italy) L Giustino	6	6
6	(Spain) A Menéndez-Maceiras	3	3
(Switzerland) H Laaksonen	1	2
Q	(Italy) R Marcora	6	6
Q	(Switzerland) M Lammer	1	6	6
7	(Italy) M Viola	6	2	4

Quarterfinals
1/WC	(Czech Republic) L Rosol	7^{7}	6
(Italy) L Giustino	6^{3}	2
Q	(Italy) R Marcora	4	4
Q	(Switzerland) M Lammer	6	6

Semifinals
1/WC	(Czech Republic) L Rosol	4	6	6
Q	(Switzerland) M Lammer	6	1	1

=== Bottom half ===
First round
8	(Spain) R Carballés Baena	6	2	3
(China) Z Zhang	3	6	6
(Czech Republic) J Mertl	3	6^{5}
WC	(Czech Republic) A Pavlásek	6	7^{7}
(Canada) S Diez	7	6
(Argentina) R Olivo	5	1
(Slovakia) Adrian Sikora	6^{2}	6	6
3	(Kazakhstan) A Nedovyesov	7^{7}	3	3
LL	(Czech Republic) R Jebavý	2	2
(Belgium) K Coppejans	6	6
(Spain) R Ramírez Hidalgo	6	7^{8}
(France) A Michon	3	6^{6}
(Brazil) R Hocevar	6^{4}	4
(Spain) G Granollers	7^{7}	6
WC	(Czech Republic) Jakub Filipsky	2	0
2	(Czech Republic) J Veselý	6	6

Second round
(China) Z Zhang	7	7
WC	(Czech Republic) A Pavlásek	5	5
(Canada) S Diez	0	6	6
(Slovakia) A Sikora	6	1	1
(Belgium) K Coppejans	6^{4}	6	4
(Spain) R Ramírez Hidalgo	7^{7}	2	6
(Spain) G Granollers	3	6^{5}
2	(Czech Republic) J Veselý	6	7^{7}

Quarterfinals
(China) Z Zhang	6	6
(Canada) S Diez	1	2
(Spain) R Ramírez Hidalgo	2	2
2	(Czech Republic) J Veselý	6	6

Semifinals
(China) Z Zhang	3	3
2	(Czech Republic) J Veselý	6	6
