= 2014 Prague Open – Doubles =

Doubles
- 2014 Prague Open

Final
- Champions: (Czech Republic) Roman Jebavý (Czech Republic) Jiří Veselý
- Runners-up: (Chinese Taipei) Lee Hsin-han (China) Zhang Ze
- Score: 6–1, 6–3

Details
- Draw: 16
- Seeds: 4

Events
Singles	Doubles
- Prague Open

This was the first edition of the tournament.

Roman Jebavý and Jiří Veselý won the title after defeating Lee Hsin-han and Zhang Ze 6–1, 6–3 in the final.

== Seeds ==
1. (Czech Republic) František Čermák / (Russia) Michail Elgin (withdrew)
2. (Republic of Ireland) James Cluskey / (Czech Republic) Jaroslav Pospíšil (semifinals)
3. (United States) Vahid Mirzadeh / (Canada) Peter Polansky (quarterfinals)
4. (Czech Republic) Lukáš Dlouhý / (Czech Republic) Jaroslav Levinský (quarterfinals)

== Draw ==
Key

- Q = Qualifier
- WC = Wild card
- LL = Lucky loser
- Alt = Alternate
- ITF = ITF entry
- PR = Protected ranking
- SR = Special ranking
- SE = Special exempt
- JE = Junior exempt
- JR = Junior Accelerator Programme entrant
- CO = College Accelerator Programme entrant
- NG = Next Gen Accelerator Program entrant
- w/o = Walkover
- r = Retired
- d = Defaulted

=== Draw ===
First round
Alt	(Switzerland) H Laaksonen (Switzerland) M Lammer	0	2
(Spain) A Menéndez-Maceiras (Spain) RR Hidalgo	6	6
(Italy) S Vagnozzi (Italy) Viola	6	6
(Spain) RC Baena (Italy) L Giustino	4	2
3	(United States) V Mirzadeh (Canada) P Polansky	6	6
WC	(Czech Republic) Marek Jaloviec (Czech Republic) Daniel Knoflicek	1	4
(Czech Republic) R Jebavý (Czech Republic) J Veselý	6	6
WC	(Czech Republic) Jakub Filipsky (Czech Republic) Pavel Staubert	0	3
(Brazil) R Hocevar (Argentina) R Olivo	1	3
(Chinese Taipei) H-h Lee (China) Z Zhang	6	6
(Czech Republic) J Hájek (Czech Republic) A Pavlásek
4	(Czech Republic) L Dlouhý (Czech Republic) J Levinský	w/o
(Czech Republic) J Mertl (Czech Republic) M Michalička	4	7	[3]
(Spain) J Checa Calvo (Slovakia) Adrian Sikora	6	5	[10]
WC	(Czech Republic) Tomáš Papik (Czech Republic) P Rikl	2	2
2	(Republic of Ireland) J Cluskey (Czech Republic) J Pospíšil	6	6

Quarterfinals
(Spain) A Menéndez-Maceiras (Spain) RR Hidalgo	6	0	[6]
(Italy) S Vagnozzi (Italy) Viola	3	6	[10]
3	(United States) V Mirzadeh (Canada) P Polansky	6	3	[6]
(Czech Republic) R Jebavý (Czech Republic) J Veselý	2	6	[10]
(Chinese Taipei) H-h Lee (China) Z Zhang	6	6
4	(Czech Republic) L Dlouhý (Czech Republic) J Levinský	4	3
(Spain) J Checa Calvo (Slovakia) A Sikora	1	6^{1}
2	(Republic of Ireland) J Cluskey (Czech Republic) J Pospíšil	6	7^{7}

Semifinals
(Italy) S Vagnozzi (Italy) Viola	2	6	[12]
(Czech Republic) R Jebavý (Czech Republic) J Veselý	6	3	[14]
(Chinese Taipei) H-h Lee (China) Z Zhang	5	6	[11]
2	(Republic of Ireland) J Cluskey (Czech Republic) J Pospíšil	7	3	[9]

Final
(Czech Republic) R Jebavý (Czech Republic) J Veselý	6	6
(Chinese Taipei) H-h Lee (China) Z Zhang	1	3
