= 2016 Sparta Prague Open – Singles =

Singles
- 2016 Sparta Prague Open

Final
- Champion: (Czech Republic) Adam Pavlásek
- Runner-up: (France) Stéphane Robert
- Score: 6–4, 3–6, 6–3

Events
Singles	Doubles
- Sparta Prague Open Challenger

Norbert Gombos was the defending champion but lost in the second round to Lukáš Rosol.

Adam Pavlásek won the title after defeating Stéphane Robert 6–4, 3–6, 6–3 in the final.

== Seeds ==
1. (Czech Republic) Lukáš Rosol (quarterfinals)
2. (Brazil) Rogério Dutra Silva (quarterfinals)
3. (France) Stéphane Robert (final)
4. (Slovakia) Jozef Kovalík (semifinals)
5. (Austria) Gerald Melzer (second round)
6. (Czech Republic) Adam Pavlásek (champion)
7. (Slovakia) Andrej Martin (first round)
8. (Estonia) Jürgen Zopp (quarterfinals)

== Draw ==
Key

- Q = Qualifier
- WC = Wild card
- LL = Lucky loser
- Alt = Alternate
- ITF = ITF entry
- PR = Protected ranking
- SR = Special ranking
- SE = Special exempt
- JE = Junior exempt
- JR = Junior Accelerator Programme entrant
- CO = College Accelerator Programme entrant
- NG = Next Gen Accelerator Program entrant
- w/o = Walkover
- r = Retired
- d = Defaulted

=== Finals ===
Semifinals
6	(Czech Republic) Adam Pavlásek	3	7	6
4	(Slovakia) Jozef Kovalík	6	5	3
3	(France) Stéphane Robert	6	7^{7}
(Austria) Dennis Novak	1	6^{4}

Final
6	(Czech Republic) Adam Pavlásek	6	3	6
3	(France) Stéphane Robert	4	6	3

=== Top half ===
First round
1	(Czech Republic) L Rosol	6	7^{7}
Q	(Austria) Lenny Hampel	1	6^{3}
(Slovakia) N Gombos	7^{7}	6
(Egypt) M Safwat	6^{3}	3
WC	(Czech Republic) P Rikl	3	6	4
(Chile) H Podlipnik	6	4	6
Q	(Czech Republic) Z Kolář	6	6^{4}	3
6	(Czech Republic) A Pavlásek	3	7^{7}	6
4	(Slovakia) J Kovalík	6	6
WC	(Czech Republic) Robin Staněk	4	2
(Germany) N Langer	7^{7}	7
(Czech Republic) J Šátral	6^{2}	5
Q	(Belarus) D Zhyrmont	1	3
PR	(Germany) C-M Stebe	6	6
(Belarus) U Ignatik	6	6
7	(Slovakia) A Martin	1	2

Second round
1	(Czech Republic) L Rosol	6	6
(Slovakia) N Gombos	3	4
(Chile) H Podlipnik	0	3
6	(Czech Republic) A Pavlásek	6	6
4	(Slovakia) J Kovalík	6	6
(Germany) N Langer	2	4
PR	(Germany) C-M Stebe	5	6	6
(Belarus) U Ignatik	7	3	0

Quarterfinals
1	(Czech Republic) L Rosol	4	6^{3}
6	(Czech Republic) A Pavlásek	6	7^{7}
4	(Slovakia) J Kovalík	6	2
PR	(Germany) C-M Stebe	2	0^{r}

Semifinals
6	(Czech Republic) A Pavlásek	3	7	6
4	(Slovakia) J Kovalík	6	5	3

=== Bottom half ===
First round
8	(Estonia) J Zopp	7	6
WC	(Czech Republic) D Kellovský	5	4
WC	(Czech Republic) M Vocel	6^{11}	2
(France) G Sakharov	7^{13}	6
(Hungary) M Fucsovics	6	6
(Spain) O Roca Batalla	4	1
(Italy) F Gaio	3	5
3	(France) S Robert	6	7
5	(Austria) G Melzer	3	7	6
(Slovenia) B Rola	6	5	1
(Czech Republic) M Michalička	5	2
(Austria) D Novak	7	6
(Kazakhstan) A Golubev	6^{6}	4
Q	(Italy) Edoardo Eremin	7^{8}	6
(Ukraine) A Smirnov	2	2
2	(Brazil) R Dutra Silva	6	6

Second round
8	(Estonia) J Zopp	7	4	6
(France) G Sakharov	5	6	1
(Hungary) M Fucsovics	2	4
3	(France) S Robert	6	6
5	(Austria) G Melzer	4	2
(Austria) D Novak	6	6
Q	(Italy) E Eremin	4	1^{r}
2	(Brazil) R Dutra Silva	6	2

Quarterfinals
8	(Estonia) J Zopp	2	3
3	(France) S Robert	6	6
(Austria) D Novak	4	6	7^{9}
2	(Brazil) R Dutra Silva	6	1	6^{7}

Semifinals
3	(France) S Robert	6	7^{7}
(Austria) D Novak	1	6^{4}
