= 2025 Kobe Challenger – Doubles =

Doubles
- 2025 Kobe Challenger

Final
- Champions: (Austria) Neil Oberleitner (Czech Republic) Michael Vrbenský
- Runners-up: (Thailand) Pruchya Isaro (India) Niki Kaliyanda Poonacha
- Score: 6–7^{(1–7)}, 7–6^{(10–8)}, [10–4]

Events
Singles	Doubles
- Kobe Challenger

Vasil Kirkov and Bart Stevens were the defending champions but chose not to defend their title.

Neil Oberleitner and Michael Vrbenský won the title after defeating Pruchya Isaro and Niki Kaliyanda Poonacha 6–7^{(1–7)}, 7–6^{(10–8)}, [10–4] in the final.

== Seeds ==
1. (New Zealand) Finn Reynolds / (New Zealand) James Watt (quarterfinals)
2. (Austria) Neil Oberleitner / (Czech Republic) Michael Vrbenský (champions)
3. (United States) Nathaniel Lammons / (Netherlands) Jean-Julien Rojer (first round)
4. (South Korea) Nam Ji-sung / (Japan) Takeru Yuzuki (quarterfinals)

== Draw ==
Key

- Q = Qualifier
- WC = Wild card
- LL = Lucky loser
- Alt = Alternate
- ITF = ITF entry
- PR = Protected ranking
- SR = Special ranking
- SE = Special exempt
- JE = Junior exempt
- JR = Junior Accelerator Programme entrant
- CO = College Accelerator Programme entrant
- NG = Next Gen Accelerator Program entrant
- w/o = Walkover
- r = Retired
- d = Defaulted

First round
1	(New Zealand) F Reynolds (New Zealand) J Watt	6	6
WC	(Japan) R Sakamoto (Japan) Y Uchiyama	1	4
(Chinese Taipei) Y-h Hsu (Chinese Taipei) T-h Huang	6	6
(Japan) K Isomura (Japan) Y Shimizu	3	4
3	(United States) N Lammons (Netherlands) J-J Rojer	6^{4}	6	[8]
WC	(Japan) T Ichikawa (Japan) Ryuki Matsuda	7^{7}	3	[10]
(Thailand) P Isaro (India) N Kaliyanda Poonacha	7	4	[10]
(Japan) M Imamura (Japan) K Uchida	5	6	[5]
(Netherlands) T Loof (India) R Ramanathan	6	7^{8}
(Netherlands) M Hermans (Netherlands) M Veldheer	4	6^{6}
PR	(Chinese Taipei) R Ho (Chinese Taipei) J Jung	2	3
4	(South Korea) J-s Nam (Japan) T Yuzuki	6	6
(United States) G Goldhoff (United States) T Winegar	7^{8}	1	[10]
(Japan) K Uesugi (Japan) S Watanabe	6^{6}	6	[7]
(United States) G Johns (India) J Nedunchezhiyan	6^{2}	6^{2}
2	(Austria) N Oberleitner (Czech Republic) M Vrbenský	7^{7}	7^{7}

Quarterfinals
1	(New Zealand) F Reynolds (New Zealand) J Watt	4	6	[8]
(Chinese Taipei) Y-h Hsu (Chinese Taipei) T-h Huang	6	4	[10]
WC	(Japan) T Ichikawa (Japan) R Matsuda	2	6^{6}
(Thailand) P Isaro (India) N Kaliyanda Poonacha	6	7^{8}
(Netherlands) T Loof (India) R Ramanathan	6	6
4	(South Korea) J-s Nam (Japan) T Yuzuki	4	4
(United States) G Goldhoff (United States) T Winegar	4	4
2	(Austria) N Oberleitner (Czech Republic) M Vrbenský	6	6

Semifinals
(Chinese Taipei) Y-h Hsu (Chinese Taipei) T-h Huang	5	3
(Thailand) P Isaro (India) N Kaliyanda Poonacha	7	6
(Netherlands) T Loof (India) R Ramanathan	5	3
2	(Austria) N Oberleitner (Czech Republic) M Vrbenský	7	6

Final
(Thailand) P Isaro (India) N Kaliyanda Poonacha	7^{7}	6^{8}	[4]
2	(Austria) N Oberleitner (Czech Republic) M Vrbenský	6^{1}	7^{10}	[10]
