= 2021 TK Sparta Prague Open =

- Date: 9–15 August
- Category: ATP Challenger Tour
- Draw: 32S / 16D
- Surface: Clay
- Location: Prague, Czech Republic
- Venue: TK Sparta Prague

Champions

Singles
- (Czech Republic) Dalibor Svrčina

Doubles
- (Czech Republic) Jonáš Forejtek / (Czech Republic) Michael Vrbenský
- Sparta Prague Open Challenger

The 2021 TK Sparta Prague Open was a professional tennis tournament played on clay courts. It was part of the 2021 ATP Challenger Tour. It took place in Prague, Czech Republic between 9 and 15 August 2021.

== Singles main-draw entrants ==
=== Seeds ===
Country	Player	Rank^{1}	Seed
SRB	Nikola Milojević	161	1
KAZ	Dmitry Popko	183	2
ITA	Lorenzo Giustino	234	3
ARG	Facundo Mena	254	4
CHI	Nicolás Jarry	263	5
ITA	Riccardo Bonadio	271	6
ESP	Adrián Menéndez Maceiras	287	7
CZE	Michael Vrbenský	288	8

- ^{1} Rankings as of 2 August 2021.

=== Other entrants ===
The following players received wildcards into the singles main draw:

- (United States) Toby Kodat
- (Czech Republic) Martin Krumich
- (Czech Republic) Dalibor Svrčina

The following player received entry into the singles main draw using a protected ranking:

- (Austria) Gerald Melzer

The following players received entry from the qualifying draw:

- (Italy) Franco Agamenone
- (Bulgaria) Adrian Andreev
- (France) Geoffrey Blancaneaux
- (United States) Emilio Nava

== Champions ==
=== Singles ===
- (Czech Republic) Dalibor Svrčina def. (Kazakhstan) Dmitry Popko 6–0, 7–5.

=== Doubles ===
- (Czech Republic) Jonáš Forejtek / (Czech Republic) Michael Vrbenský def. (Russia) Evgeny Karlovskiy / (Russia) Evgenii Tiurnev 6–1, 6–4.
