= 2014 Prague Open =

- Date: 9–15 June
- Edition: 1st
- Draw: 32S / 16D
- Prize money: €42,500
- Surface: Clay
- Location: Prague, Czech Republic
- Venue: TK Sparta Prague

Champions

Singles
- (Czech Republic) Lukáš Rosol

Doubles
- (Czech Republic) Roman Jebavý / (Czech Republic) Jiří Veselý
- Prague Open

The 2014 Prague Open was a professional tennis tournament played on clay courts. It was the 1st edition of the tournament which was part of the 2014 ATP Challenger Tour. It took place in Prague, Czech Republic between 9 and 15 June 2014.

== Singles main-draw entrants ==
=== Seeds ===
Country	Player	Rank^{1}	Seed
CZE	Lukáš Rosol	52	1
CZE	Jiří Veselý	81	2
KAZ	Aleksandr Nedovyesov	101	3
CAN	Peter Polansky	135	4
CZE	Jan Hájek	159	5
ESP	Adrián Menéndez Maceiras	174	6
ITA	Matteo Viola	184	7
ESP	Roberto Carballés Baena	185	8

- ^{1} Rankings are as of May 26, 2014.

=== Other entrants ===
The following players received wildcards into the singles main draw:

- (Czech Republic) Jakub Filipsky
- (Czech Republic) Adam Pavlásek
- (Czech Republic) Lukáš Rosol
- (Czech Republic) Pavel Staubert

The following players received entry from the qualifying draw:

- (Italy) Alessandro Giannessi
- (Czech Republic) Marek Michalička
- (Italy) Roberto Marcora
- (Switzerland) Michael Lammer

== Doubles main-draw entrants ==
=== Seeds ===
Country	Player	Country	Player	Rank^{1}	Seed
CZE	František Čermák	RUS	Michail Elgin	123	1
IRL	James Cluskey	CZE	Jaroslav Pospíšil	336	2
USA	Vahid Mirzadeh	CAN	Peter Polansky	386	3
CZE	Lukáš Dlouhý	CZE	Jaroslav Levinský	411	4

- ^{1} Rankings as of May 26, 2014.

=== Other entrants ===
The following pairs received wildcards into the doubles main draw:

- (Czech Republic) Marek Jaloviec / (Czech Republic) Daniel Knoflicek
- (Czech Republic) Jakub Filipsky / (Czech Republic) Pavel Staubert
- (Czech Republic) Tomáš Papik / (Czech Republic) Patrik Rikl

== Champions ==
=== Singles ===
- (Czech Republic) Lukáš Rosol def. (Czech Republic) Jiří Veselý, 3–6, 6–4, 6–4

=== Doubles ===
- (Czech Republic) Roman Jebavý / (Czech Republic) Jiří Veselý def. (Chinese Taipei) Lee Hsin-han / (China) Zhang Ze, 6–1, 6–3
