= 2025 National Bank Open – Men's singles =

Tennis tournament in Toronto, Canada

Men's singles
- 2025 National Bank Open

Final
- Champion: (United States) Ben Shelton
- Runner-up: Karen Khachanov
- Score: 6–7^{(5–7)}, 6–4, 7–6^{(7–3)}

Details
- Draw: 96 (16 Q / 5 WC )
- Seeds: 32

Events
Singles	men	women
Doubles	men	women
- Canadian Open

Ben Shelton defeated Karen Khachanov in the final, 6–7^{(5–7)}, 6–4, 7–6^{(7–3)} to win the men's singles tennis title at the 2025 Canadian Open. It was his first ATP 1000 title and third career ATP Tour title. Shelton was the youngest American man to win a Masters title since Andy Roddick at the 2004 Miami Open.

Alexei Popyrin was the defending champion, but lost in the quarterfinals to Alexander Zverev.

By reaching his first ATP 1000 final since the 2018 Paris Masters, Khachanov recorded the longest gap between successive ATP 1000 finals appearances, at six years and nine months. With his third-round win, Zverev became the first man born in the 1990s to win 500 ATP Tour level main-draw singles matches, and the fifth active player to do so. Taylor Fritz became the first American man to reach the quarterfinals at all nine ATP 1000 tournaments.

This event marked the final professional appearance of former Davis Cup and Wimbledon doubles champion, Vasek Pospisil. He lost in the first round to Facundo Bagnis.

== Seeds ==
All seeds received a bye into the second round.

1. (Germany) Alexander Zverev (semifinals)
2. (United States) Taylor Fritz (semifinals)
3. (Italy) Lorenzo Musetti (third round)
4. (United States) Ben Shelton (champion)
5. (Denmark) Holger Rune (fourth round)
6. Andrey Rublev (quarterfinals)
7. (United States) Frances Tiafoe (fourth round)
8. (Norway) Casper Ruud (fourth round)
9. (Australia) Alex de Minaur (quarterfinals)
10. Daniil Medvedev (third round)
11. Karen Khachanov (final)
12. (Czech Republic) Jakub Menšík (third round)
13. (Italy) Flavio Cobolli (fourth round)
14. (Argentina) Francisco Cerúndolo (fourth round, retired)
15. (France) Arthur Fils (third round)
16. (Czech Republic) Tomáš Macháč (second round)
17. (France) Ugo Humbert (withdrew)
18. (Australia) Alexei Popyrin (quarterfinals)
19. (Czech Republic) Jiří Lehečka (fourth round)
20. (Spain) Alejandro Davidovich Fokina (fourth round, retired)
21. (Canada) Félix Auger-Aliassime (second round)
22. (Canada) Denis Shapovalov (second round)
23. (Greece) Stefanos Tsitsipas (second round)
24. (Netherlands) Tallon Griekspoor (second round)
25. (United States) Brandon Nakashima (third round)
26. (United States) Alex Michelsen (quarterfinals)
27. (Canada) Gabriel Diallo (third round)
28. (Italy) Lorenzo Sonego (third round)
29. (France) Alexandre Müller (third round)
30. (Portugal) Nuno Borges (third round)
31. (United Kingdom) Cameron Norrie (second round)
32. (Italy) Matteo Arnaldi (third round)

Click on the seed number of a player to go to their draw section.

== Draw ==
Key

- Q = Qualifier
- WC = Wild card
- LL = Lucky loser
- Alt = Alternate
- ITF = ITF entry
- PR = Protected ranking
- SR = Special ranking
- SE = Special exempt
- JE = Junior exempt
- JR = Junior Accelerator Programme entrant
- CO = College Accelerator Programme entrant
- NG = Next Gen Accelerator Program entrant
- w/o = Walkover
- r = Retired
- d = Defaulted

=== Finals ===
Quarterfinals
1	(Germany) Alexander Zverev	6^{8}	6	6
18	(Australia) Alexei Popyrin	7^{10}	4	3
26	(United States) Alex Michelsen	4	6^{3}
11	Karen Khachanov	6	7^{7}
9	(Australia) Alex de Minaur	3	4
4	(United States) Ben Shelton	6	6
6	Andrey Rublev	3	6^{4}
2	(United States) Taylor Fritz	6	7^{7}

Semifinals
1	(Germany) Alexander Zverev	3	6	6^{4}
11	Karen Khachanov	6	4	7^{7}
4	(United States) Ben Shelton	6	6
2	(United States) Taylor Fritz	4	3

Final
11	Karen Khachanov	7^{7}	4	6^{3}
4	(United States) Ben Shelton	6^{5}	6	7^{7}

=== Top half ===
==== Section 1 ====
First round
(Australia) A Walton	4	6	6
(France) B Bonzi	6	0	3
Q	(Australia) T Schoolkate	7^{7}	6
(Brazil) J Fonseca	6^{5}	4
Q	(France) P-H Herbert	4	6	5
(Argentina) TM Etcheverry	6	4	7
Q	(Canada) D Martin	3	0
(Spain) J Munar	6	6

Second round
1	(Germany) A Zverev	7^{8}	6
(Australia) A Walton	6^{6}	4
Q	(Australia) T Schoolkate	3	6	3
32	(Italy) M Arnaldi	6	3	6
24	(Netherlands) T Griekspoor	4	6^{4}
(Argentina) TM Etcheverry	6	7^{7}
(Spain) J Munar	6^{4}	6	4
14	(Argentina) F Cerúndolo	7^{7}	4	6

Third round
1	(Germany) A Zverev	6^{5}	6	6
32	(Italy) M Arnaldi	7^{7}	3	2
(Argentina) TM Etcheverry	3	4
14	(Argentina) F Cerúndolo	6	6

Fourth round
1	(Germany) A Zverev	6	1
14	(Argentina) F Cerúndolo	4	0^{r}

==== Section 2 ====
First round
Q	(Belgium) A Blockx	4	2
LL	(Czech Republic) D Svrčina	6	6
WC	(Canada) N Arseneault	6	7^{7}
Q	(France) V Royer	3	6^{4}
(Serbia) M Kecmanović	4	6	7
(France) Q Halys	6	4	5
Q	(Japan) S Mochizuki	4	2
(France) G Mpetshi Perricard	6	6

Second round
10	D Medvedev	7^{7}	6
LL	(Czech Republic) D Svrčina	6^{3}	4
WC	(Canada) N Arseneault	6^{7}	3
18	(Australia) A Popyrin	7^{9}	6
29	(France) A Müller	2	6	7
(Serbia) M Kecmanović	6	3	5
(France) G Mpetshi Perricard	6^{7}	3
5	(Denmark) H Rune	7^{9}	6

Third round
10	D Medvedev	7	4	4
18	(Australia) A Popyrin	5	6	6
29	(France) A Müller	2	4
5	(Denmark) H Rune	6	6

Fourth round
18	(Australia) A Popyrin	4	6	6
5	(Denmark) H Rune	6	2	3

==== Section 3 ====
First round
(China) J Shang	3	6^{3}
Q	(Australia) J Duckworth	6	7^{7}
(France) G Monfils	4	6	6^{3}
Q	(Chile) T Barrios Vera	6	4	7^{7}
Q	(United States) C Smith	4	5
(United States) L Tien	6	7
PR	(Austria) S Ofner	6^{6}	5
(United States) R Opelka	7^{8}	7

Second round
3	(Italy) L Musetti	7	6
Q	(Australia) J Duckworth	5	1
Q	(Chile) T Barrios Vera	6^{7}	3
26	(United States) A Michelsen	7^{9}	6
22	(Canada) D Shapovalov	6^{4}	5
(United States) L Tien	7^{7}	7
(United States) R Opelka	7^{7}	6^{5}	6
16	(Czech Republic) T Macháč	6^{5}	7^{7}	3

Third round
3	(Italy) L Musetti	6	6^{4}	4
26	(United States) A Michelsen	3	7^{7}	6
(United States) L Tien	7^{7}	6
(United States) R Opelka	6^{3}	3

Fourth round
26	(United States) A Michelsen	6	6
(United States) L Tien	3	3

==== Section 4 ====
First round
(United Kingdom) J Fearnley	2	3
Q	(Argentina) JP Ficovich	6	6
Q	(United States) E Nava	6	7^{7}
(Belgium) Z Bergs	1	6^{4}
Q	(Argentina) F Bagnis	6	3	6
WC	(Canada) V Pospisil	2	6	3
R Safiullin	4	6	7^{11}
Q	(France) U Blanchet	6	2	6^{9}

Second round
11	K Khachanov	6	6
Q	(Argentina) JP Ficovich	4	2
Q	(United States) E Nava	6	7
LL	(France) T Atmane	2	5
30	(Portugal) N Borges	5	7^{7}	6
Q	(Argentina) F Bagnis	7	6^{3}	2
R Safiullin	3	3
8	(Norway) C Ruud	6	6

Third round
11	K Khachanov	6^{6}	6	6
Q	(United States) E Nava	7^{8}	4	1
30	(Portugal) N Borges	5	4
8	(Norway) C Ruud	7	6

Fourth round
11	K Khachanov	6	7
8	(Norway) C Ruud	4	5

=== Bottom half ===
==== Section 5 ====
First round
Q	(Japan) Y Watanuki	3	6	6
(Germany) D Altmaier	6	1	4
(Australia) A Vukic	7	6
(Spain) P Martínez	5	3
(Australia) C O'Connell	6	6
LL	(Chinese Taipei) C-h Tseng	1	2
(Argentina) F Comesaña	6	7
(Bosnia and Herzegovina) D Džumhur	3	5

Second round
7	(United States) F Tiafoe	1	7	7^{7}
Q	(Japan) Y Watanuki	6	5	6^{5}
(Australia) A Vukic	6	6^{2}	6
31	(United Kingdom) C Norrie	3	7^{7}	3
23	(Greece) S Tsitsipas	4	6	2
(Australia) C O'Connell	6	4	6
(Argentina) F Comesaña	4	2
9	(Australia) A de Minaur	6	6

Third round
7	(United States) F Tiafoe	6	4	6
(Australia) A Vukic	3	6	3
(Australia) C O'Connell
9	(Australia) A de Minaur	w/o

Fourth round
7	(United States) F Tiafoe	2	6	4
9	(Australia) A de Minaur	6	4	6

==== Section 6 ====
First round
(France) A Rinderknech	6^{2}	3
WC	(Canada) A Galarneau	7^{7}	6
(Hungary) F Marozsán	6	6
(Bolivia) H Dellien	2	2
(United States) E Quinn	7^{7}	6
(Japan) Y Nishioka	6^{1}	2
(United States) M Giron	4	4
Q	(France) A Mannarino	6	6

Second round
13	(Italy) F Cobolli	6	5	6
WC	(Canada) A Galarneau	4	7	4
(Hungary) F Marozsán	6	6
21	(Canada) F Auger-Aliassime	4	4
25	(United States) B Nakashima	7^{8}	6
(United States) E Quinn	6^{6}	4
Q	(France) A Mannarino	2	3
4	(United States) B Shelton	6	6

Third round
13	(Italy) F Cobolli	6	4	6
(Hungary) F Marozsán	2	6	3
25	(United States) B Nakashima	7^{10}	2	6^{5}
4	(United States) B Shelton	6^{8}	6	7^{7}

Fourth round
13	(Italy) F Cobolli	4	6	6^{1}
4	(United States) B Shelton	6	4	7^{7}

==== Section 7 ====
First round
(Italy) M Bellucci	6	4	0^{r}
(France) H Gaston	3	6	2
(Czech Republic) V Kopřiva	6^{4}	2
(China) Y Bu	7^{7}	6
(France) C Moutet	6	6
PR	(United States) J Brooksby	2	1
Q	(United States) T Boyer	7	7^{7}
(United States) A Kovacevic	5	6^{3}

Second round
6	A Rublev	6	6
(France) H Gaston	2	3
(China) Y Bu	1	4
28	(Italy) L Sonego	6	6
20	(Spain) A Davidovich Fokina	6	6
(France) C Moutet	4	3
Q	(United States) T Boyer	4	4
12	(Czech Republic) J Menšík	6	6

Third round
6	A Rublev	5	6	6
28	(Italy) L Sonego	7	4	3
20	(Spain) A Davidovich Fokina	6	6
12	(Czech Republic) J Menšík	2	4

Fourth round
6	A Rublev	6^{3}	7^{7}	3
20	(Spain) A Davidovich Fokina	7^{7}	6^{2}	0^{r}

==== Section 8 ====
First round
WC	(Canada) L Draxl	6	4	4
(Spain) P Carreño Busta	2	6	6
(United States) M McDonald	6	6
(Belgium) D Goffin	4	4
(Croatia) B Ćorić	6	2	6^{2}
WC	(Italy) M Gigante	4	6	7^{7}
(Spain) R Carballés Baena	6	4
(Argentina) C Ugo Carabelli	4	1^{r}

Second round
15	(France) A Fils	6	6
(Spain) P Carreño Busta	3	4
(United States) M McDonald	6^{2}	4
19	(Czech Republic) J Lehečka	7^{7}	6
27	(Canada) G Diallo	6	7^{7}
WC	(Italy) M Gigante	3	6^{5}
(Spain) R Carballés Baena	5	6^{1}
2	(United States) T Fritz	7	7^{7}

Third round
15	(France) A Fils	6	3	4
19	(Czech Republic) J Lehečka	3	6	6
27	(Canada) G Diallo	4	2
2	(United States) T Fritz	6	6

Fourth round
19	(Czech Republic) J Lehečka	6^{4}	7^{7}	6^{5}
2	(United States) T Fritz	7^{7}	6^{5}	7^{7}

== Seeded players ==
The following are the seeded players. Seedings are based on ATP rankings as of 21 July 2025. Rankings and points before are as of 28 July 2025.

Unlike the WTA, the ATP will only drop points from the week of 29 July 2024 (Washington) during this year's National Bank Open and backdate the ranking points at the end of the tournament to 4 August 2025. Points from the 2024 National Bank Open held in Montreal will be dropped at the end of the 2025 Cincinnati Open instead. Accordingly, the Points Defending column in the table below reflects the 19th best result (in parentheses) of players who are not defending points from Washington.

Seed	Rank	Player	Points before	Points defending (or 19th best result)	Points earned	Points after	Status
1	3	(Germany) Alexander Zverev	6,030	(50)	400	6,380	Semifinals lost to Karen Khachanov [11]
2	4	(United States) Taylor Fritz	5,135	(10)	400	5,525	Semifinals lost to (United States) Ben Shelton [4]
3	10	(Italy) Lorenzo Musetti	3,195	(10)	50	3,235	Third round lost to (United States) Alex Michelsen [26]
4	7	(United States) Ben Shelton	3,520	200	1,000	4,320	Champion, defeated Karen Khachanov [11]
5	9	(Denmark) Holger Rune	3,250	(10)	100	3,340	Fourth round lost to (Australia) Alexei Popyrin [18]
6	11	Andrey Rublev	3,110	100	200	3,210	Quarterfinals lost to (United States) Taylor Fritz [2]
7	12	(United States) Frances Tiafoe	2,990	200	100	2,890	Fourth round lost to (Australia) Alex de Minaur [9]
8	13	(Norway) Casper Ruud	2,905	(10)	100	2,995	Fourth round lost to Karen Khachanov [11]
9	8	(Australia) Alex de Minaur	3,335	(55)	200	3,480	Quarterfinals lost to (United States) Ben Shelton [4]
10	14	Daniil Medvedev	2,720	(50)	50	2,720	Third round lost to (Australia) Alexei Popyrin [18]
11	16	Karen Khachanov	2,590	(50)	650	3,190	Runner-up, lost to (United States) Ben Shelton [4]
12	18	(Czech Republic) Jakub Menšík	2,362	(16)	50	2,396	Third round lost to (Spain) Alejandro Davidovich Fokina [20]
13	17	(Italy) Flavio Cobolli	2,385	330	100	2,155	Fourth round lost to (United States) Ben Shelton [4]
14	24	(Argentina) Francisco Cerúndolo	2,085	(50)	100	2,135	Fourth round retired against (Germany) Alexander Zverev [1]
15	21	(France) Arthur Fils	2,130	(0)	50	2,180	Third round lost to (Czech Republic) Jiří Lehečka [19]
16	22	(Czech Republic) Tomáš Macháč	2,110	(10)	10	2,110	Second round lost to (United States) Reilly Opelka
17	23	(France) Ugo Humbert	2,095	(10)	0	2,085	Withdrew due to back injury
18	26	(Australia) Alexei Popyrin	2,050	(0)	200	2,250	Quarterfinals lost to (Germany) Alexander Zverev [1]
19	27	(Czech Republic) Jiří Lehečka	2,015	(50)	100	2,065	Fourth round lost to (United States) Taylor Fritz [2]
20	19	(Spain) Alejandro Davidovich Fokina	2,225	50	100	2,275	Fourth round retired against Andrey Rublev [6]
21	28	(Canada) Félix Auger-Aliassime	1,865	(50)	10	1,825	Second round lost to (Hungary) Fábián Marozsán
22	29	(Canada) Denis Shapovalov	1,836	100	10	1,746	Second round lost to (United States) Learner Tien
23	30	(Greece) Stefanos Tsitsipas	1,825	(45)	10	1,790	Second round lost to (Australia) Christopher O'Connell
24	31	(Netherlands) Tallon Griekspoor	1,715	(50)	10	1,675	Second round lost to (Argentina) Tomás Martín Etcheverry
25	32	(United States) Brandon Nakashima	1,700	(50)	50	1,700	Third round lost to (United States) Ben Shelton [4]
26	34	(United States) Alex Michelsen	1,555	100	200	1,655	Quarterfinals lost to Karen Khachanov [11]
27	36	(Canada) Gabriel Diallo	1,333	(16)	50	1,367	Third round lost to (United States) Taylor Fritz [2]
28	38	(Italy) Lorenzo Sonego	1,281	(10)	50	1,321	Third round lost to Andrey Rublev [6]
29	40	(France) Alexandre Müller	1,271	(125)^{§}	50	1,196	Third round lost to (Denmark) Holger Rune [5]
30	42	(Portugal) Nuno Borges	1,265	(25)	50	1,290	Third round lost to (Norway) Casper Ruud [8]
31	39	(United Kingdom) Cameron Norrie	1,277	(14)	10	1,273	Second round lost to (Australia) Aleksandar Vukic
32	41	(Italy) Matteo Arnaldi	1,265	(0)	50	1,315	Third round lost to (Germany) Alexander Zverev [1]

§ The player is defending points from an ATP Challenger Tour tournament (San Marino).

=== Withdrawn seeded players ===
The following players would have been seeded, but withdrew before the tournament began.

Rank	Player	Points before	Points dropping (or 19th best result)	Points after	Withdrawal reason
1	(Italy) Jannik Sinner	12,030	(0)	12,030	Elbow injury
2	(Spain) Carlos Alcaraz	8,600	(10)	8,590	Fatigue
5	(United Kingdom) Jack Draper	4,650	(0)	4,650	Arm injury
6	(Serbia) Novak Djokovic	4,130	(0)	4,130	Groin injury
15	(United States) Tommy Paul	2,620	(10)	2,610	Abdominal injury
20	(Bulgaria) Grigor Dimitrov	2,155	(0)	2,155	Pectoral injury
25	(Kazakhstan) Alexander Bublik	2,065	(10)	2,055	Schedule change

== Other entry information ==
=== Wildcards ===
- (Canada) Nicolas Arseneault
- (Canada) Liam Draxl
- (Canada) Alexis Galarneau
- (Italy) Matteo Gigante
- (Canada) Vasek Pospisil

=== Protected ranking ===
- (United States) Jenson Brooksby
- (Austria) Sebastian Ofner

=== Withdrawals ===
- ‡ (Spain) Carlos Alcaraz → replaced by (Bolivia) Hugo Dellien
- ‡ (Argentina) Sebastián Báez → replaced by (Australia) Aleksandar Vukic
- ‡ (Spain) Roberto Bautista Agut → replaced by (France) Hugo Gaston
- ‡ (Italy) Matteo Berrettini → replaced by (Japan) Yoshihito Nishioka
- ‡ (Kazakhstan) Alexander Bublik → replaced by (Spain) Pablo Carreño Busta
- § (Italy) Luciano Darderi → replaced by (Czech Republic) Dalibor Svrčina (LL)
- ‡ (Bulgaria) Grigor Dimitrov → replaced by (China) Shang Juncheng
- § (Serbia) Laslo Djere → replaced by (Chinese Taipei) Tseng Chun-hsin (LL)
- ‡ (Serbia) Novak Djokovic → replaced by Roman Safiullin
- ‡ (United Kingdom) Jack Draper → replaced by (Austria) Sebastian Ofner
- § (France) Ugo Humbert → replaced by (France) Térence Atmane (LL)
- ‡ (Poland) Hubert Hurkacz → replaced by (Czech Republic) Vít Kopřiva
- ‡ (United States) Sebastian Korda → replaced by (Australia) Christopher O'Connell
- ‡ (Serbia) Hamad Medjedovic → replaced by (United States) Ethan Quinn
- ‡ (Japan) Kei Nishikori → replaced by (United States) Mackenzie McDonald
- ‡ (United States) Tommy Paul → replaced by (Croatia) Borna Ćorić
- ‡ (Italy) Jannik Sinner → replaced by (Spain) Roberto Carballés Baena
- ‡ (Australia) Jordan Thompson → replaced by (United States) Aleksandar Kovacevic

‡ – withdrew from entry list
§ – withdrew from main draw

== Qualifying ==
=== Seeds ===
1. (France) Adrian Mannarino (qualified)
2. (Chinese Taipei) Tseng Chun-hsin (qualifying competition, lucky loser)
3. (Australia) Tristan Schoolkate (qualified)
4. (Australia) James Duckworth (qualified)
5. (France) Valentin Royer (qualified)
6. (United States) Emilio Nava (qualified)
7. (Czech Republic) Dalibor Svrčina (qualifying competition, lucky loser)
8. (Belgium) Alexander Blockx (qualified)
9. (Japan) Shintaro Mochizuki (qualified)
10. (United States) Tristan Boyer (qualified)
11. (France) Térence Atmane (qualifying competition, lucky loser)
12. (Argentina) Juan Pablo Ficovich (qualified)
13. (United States) Colton Smith (qualified)
14. (France) Pierre-Hugues Herbert (qualified)
15. (Chile) Tomás Barrios Vera (qualified)
16. (Japan) Taro Daniel (qualifying competition)
17. (Japan) Yosuke Watanuki (qualified)
18. (France) Kyrian Jacquet (qualifying competition)
19. (United States) Mitchell Krueger (qualifying competition)
20. (Australia) Li Tu (qualifying competition)
21. (Hong Kong) Coleman Wong (qualifying competition)
22. (Japan) James Trotter (qualifying competition)
23. (United States) Patrick Kypson (qualifying competition)
24. (France) Ugo Blanchet (qualified)
25. (Japan) Yasutaka Uchiyama (qualifying competition)
26. (Croatia) Duje Ajduković (qualifying competition)
27. (United States) Govind Nanda (qualifying competition)
28. (Canada) Juan Carlos Aguilar (qualifying competition)
29. (Canada) Alvin Nicholas Tudorica (qualifying competition)
30. (Canada) Dan Martin (qualified)
31. (Canada) Justin Boulais (qualifying competition)
32. (Argentina) Facundo Bagnis (qualified)

=== Qualifiers ===
1. (France) Adrian Mannarino
2. (France) Ugo Blanchet
3. (Australia) Tristan Schoolkate
4. (Australia) James Duckworth
5. (France) Valentin Royer
6. (United States) Emilio Nava
7. (Japan) Yosuke Watanuki
8. (Belgium) Alexander Blockx
9. (Japan) Shintaro Mochizuki
10. (United States) Tristan Boyer
11. (Argentina) Facundo Bagnis
12. (Argentina) Juan Pablo Ficovich
13. (United States) Colton Smith
14. (France) Pierre-Hugues Herbert
15. (Chile) Tomás Barrios Vera
16. (Canada) Dan Martin

=== Lucky losers ===
1. (Chinese Taipei) Tseng Chun-hsin
2. (Czech Republic) Dalibor Svrčina
3. (France) Térence Atmane

=== Qualifying draw ===
==== First qualifier ====
Qualifying competition
1	(France) Adrian Mannarino	6	6
28/WC	(Canada) Juan Carlos Aguilar	3	1

==== Second qualifier ====
Qualifying competition
2	(Chinese Taipei) Tseng Chun-hsin	4	5
24	(France) Ugo Blanchet	6	7

==== Third qualifier ====
Qualifying competition
3	(Australia) Tristan Schoolkate	6	6
27/Alt	(United States) Govind Nanda	3	0

==== Fourth qualifier ====
Qualifying competition
4	(Australia) James Duckworth	6	6
31/WC	(Canada) Justin Boulais	3	1

==== Fifth qualifier ====
Qualifying competition
5	(France) Valentin Royer	6	6
29/WC	(Canada) Alvin Nicholas Tudorica	2	3

==== Sixth qualifier ====
Qualifying competition
6	(United States) Emilio Nava	6	7^{7}
19	(United States) Mitchell Krueger	4	6^{5}

==== Seventh qualifier ====
Qualifying competition
7	(Czech Republic) Dalibor Svrčina	6^{2}	6	4
17	(Japan) Yosuke Watanuki	7^{7}	1	6

==== Eighth qualifier ====
Qualifying competition
8	(Belgium) Alexander Blockx	6	6
26	(Croatia) Duje Ajduković	4	4

==== Ninth qualifier ====
Qualifying competition
9	(Japan) Shintaro Mochizuki	6	6
25/Alt	(Japan) Yasutaka Uchiyama	4	3

==== Tenth qualifier ====
Qualifying competition
10	(United States) Tristan Boyer	7^{8}	6
22	(Japan) James Trotter	6^{6}	3

==== Eleventh qualifier ====
Qualifying competition
11	(France) Térence Atmane	4	4
32/PR	(Argentina) Facundo Bagnis	6	6

==== Twelfth qualifier ====
Qualifying competition
12	(Argentina) Juan Pablo Ficovich	6	4	6
18	(France) Kyrian Jacquet	2	6	4

==== Thirteenth qualifier ====
Qualifying competition
13	(United States) Colton Smith	6	7
23/Alt	(United States) Patrick Kypson	1	5

==== Fourteenth qualifier ====
Qualifying competition
14	(France) Pierre-Hugues Herbert	6	3	6
20	(Australia) Li Tu	3	6	3

==== Fifteenth qualifier ====
Qualifying competition
15	(Chile) Tomás Barrios Vera	6	6
21	(Hong Kong) Coleman Wong	4	4

==== Sixteenth qualifier ====
Qualifying competition
16	(Japan) Taro Daniel	7^{8}	6^{4}	5
30/WC	(Canada) Dan Martin	6^{6}	7^{7}	7
