= 2016 Sparta Prague Open =

- Date: 6–11 June
- Edition: 3rd
- Category: ATP Challenger Tour
- Draw: 32S / 16D
- Prize money: €42,500+H
- Surface: Clay
- Location: Prague, Czech Republic
- Venue: TK Sparta Prague

Champions

Singles
- (Czech Republic) Adam Pavlásek

Doubles
- (Poland) Tomasz Bednarek / (Croatia) Nikola Mektić
- Sparta Prague Open Challenger

The 2016 Sparta Prague Open was a professional tennis tournament played on clay courts. It was the third edition of the tournament which was part of the 2016 ATP Challenger Tour. It took place in Prague, Czech Republic between 6 and 11 June 2016.

== Singles main-draw entrants ==
=== Seeds ===
| Country | Player | Rank^{1} | Seed |
|---|---|---|---|
| CZE | Lukáš Rosol | 59 | 1 |
| BRA | Rogério Dutra Silva | 85 | 2 |
| FRA | Stéphane Robert | 90 | 3 |
| SVK | Jozef Kovalík | 125 | 4 |
| AUT | Gerald Melzer | 129 | 5 |
| CZE | Adam Pavlásek | 132 | 6 |
| SVK | Andrej Martin | 133 | 7 |
| EST | Jürgen Zopp | 181 | 8 |

- ^{1} Rankings as of 30 May 2016.

=== Other entrants ===
The following players received wildcards into the singles main draw:

- (Czech Republic) Dominik Kellovský
- (Czech Republic) Patrik Rikl
- (Czech Republic) Robin Staněk
- (Czech Republic) Matěj Vocel

The following player received entry into the singles main draw with a protected ranking:

- (Germany) Cedrik-Marcel Stebe

The following players received entry from the qualifying draw:

- (Italy) Edoardo Eremin
- (Austria) Lenny Hampel
- (Czech Republic) Zdeněk Kolář
- (Belarus) Dzmitry Zhyrmont

== Champions ==
=== Singles ===
- (Czech Republic) Adam Pavlásek def. (France) Stéphane Robert, 6–4, 3–6, 6–3

=== Doubles ===
- (Poland) Tomasz Bednarek / (Croatia) Nikola Mektić def. (Czech Republic) Zdeněk Kolář / (Czech Republic) Matěj Vocel, 6–4, 5–7, [10–7]
