= Dalibor Svrčina =

Czech tennis player (born 2002)

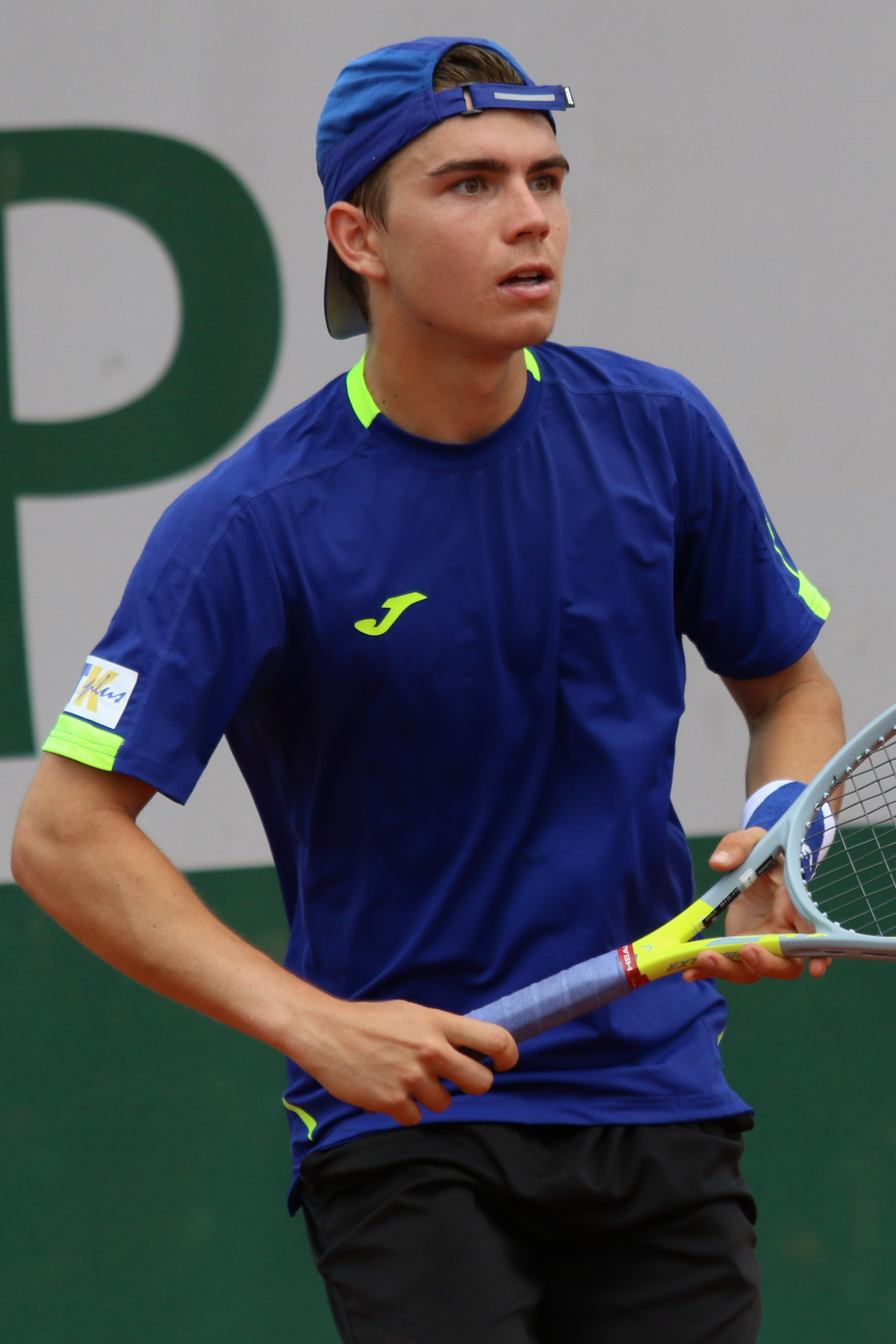
- Svrčina at the 2022 French Open
- Country (sports): Czech Republic
- Born: 2 October 2002 (age 24) Ostrava, Czech Republic
- Height: 1.78 m (5 ft 10 in)
- Plays: Right-handed (two-handed backhand)
- Coach: Marek Jaloviec
- Prize money: US $1,192,251

Singles
- Career record: 9–11
- Career titles: 0
- Highest ranking: No. 86 (10 November 2025)
- Current ranking: No. 113 (22 June 2026)

Grand Slam singles results
- Australian Open: 2R (2023)
- French Open: Q3 (2026)
- Wimbledon: 1R (2026)
- US Open: 2R (2026)

Doubles
- Career record: 0–0
- Career titles: 0
- Highest ranking: No. 276 (2 October 2023)
- Current ranking: No. 754 (20 April 2026)
- Last updated on: 25 June 2026.

Dalibor Svrčina (born 2 October 2002) is a Czech tennis player. He has a career-high ATP singles ranking of world No. 86 achieved on 10 November 2025 and a doubles ranking of No. 276, reached on 2 October 2023. He is currently the No. 5 Czech player.

== Career ==
=== 2018-2019: Juniors ===
Svrčina achieved an ITF junior combined ranking of world No. 8 in April 2018. He won the 2019 Australian Open boys' doubles title with compatriot Jonáš Forejtek.

=== 2021-2022: First Challenger title & top 200 ===
In August 2021, Svrčina won his first Challenger title as a wildcard at the 2021 ATP Prague Open where he defeated Dmitry Popko. As a result, he reached a career-high of No. 334 on 16 August 2021. He reached the top 300 on 15 November 2021 at No. 298.

In April 2022, Svrčina reached his second Challenger final, again in Prague, where he lost to Sebastian Ofner. As a result, he reached the top 200 at a career high of world No. 199 on 2 May 2022.

=== 2023-2024: United Cup, Major, ATP debuts & first wins ===
In January 2023, Svrčina qualified for the Australian Open to make his Grand Slam debut. He defeated Jaume Munar for his first major win.

He made his ATP debut at the 2023 Zhuhai Championships he defeated local wildcard Zhe Li for his first win at this level, and only the second overall following the win at the Australian Open. Svrčina reached a career high of No. 154 on 2 October 2023.

At the 2024 Open Sud de France, he qualified for a second time at the ATP level but lost to Alexander Shevchenko

=== 2025: Masters debut and first win, Top 100 ===
Svrčina won the title at the 2025 Pune Challenger defeating Brandon Holt in the final. Following a semifinal showing at the 2025 Napoli Tennis Cup and his fourth Challenger title at the 2025 Open Città della Disfida, Svrčina reached the top 150 at world No. 132 on 7 April 2025.

At the 2025 National Bank Open Svrčina made his Masters debut as a lucky loser, and recorded his first main draw win over fellow qualifier Alexander Blockx.

Svrčina won his fifth title at the 2025 Cancún Country Open defeating Thiago Agustín Tirante in three sets to claim his first Challenger 125 title which moved him to the Top 100 for the first time to his new career high of No. 98 on 18 August 2025.

At the 2025 Hangzhou Open where he entered the main draw as a Lucky Loser, Svrčina upset eight seed Matteo Berrettini and local favorite Zhang Zhizhen to reach his first ATP quarterfinal. As a result, he moved into the top 90 in the singles rankings on 22 September 2025.

=== 2026: Davis Cup and Wimbledon debuts ===
Svrčina started his season at the 2026 United Cup, his second appearance, and played two matches in mixed doubles with Miriam Škoch and Linda Fruhvirtová respectively. His ranking gained him direct entry into the Australian Open, but he lost in five sets to Jaume Munar in the first round.

Svrčina made his debut for the Czech Republic Davis Cup team in their first round match against Sweden, defeating their opponent's No. 1 singles player, Olle Wallin, in straight sets to set up a 3–1 overall win in the tie.

Svrčina won his opening round match at Mexican Open against James Duckworth in straight sets to claim his first win at ATP 500 level. He lost in the next round to fifth seed and eventual champion Flavio Cobolli also in straight sets.

== Performance timeline ==
Key
W	F	SF	QF	#R	RR	Q#	DNQ	A	NH

(W) winner; (F) finalist; (SF) semifinalist; (QF) quarterfinalist; (#R) rounds 4, 3, 2, 1; (RR) round-robin stage; (Q#) qualification round; (DNQ) did not qualify; (A) absent; (NH) not held; (SR) strike rate (events won / competed); (W–L) win–loss record.

=== Singles ===
Current through the 2026 Miami Open

Tournament	2021	2022	2023	2024	2025	2026	SR	W–L	Win %
Grand Slams tournaments
Australian Open	A	A	2R	Q1	Q3	1R	0 / 2	1–2	33%
French Open	A	Q1	Q2	Q2	Q2	Q3	0 / 0	0–0	–
Wimbledon	A	Q2	Q1	Q1	Q2	1R	0 / 1	0–1	0%
US Open	A	Q2	Q1	A	Q1		0 / 0	0–0	–
Win–Loss	0–0	0–0	1–1	0–0	0–0	0–2	0 / 3	1–3	25%
ATP 1000 tournaments
Indian Wells Masters	A	A	A	A	A	2R	0 / 1	1–1	50%
Miami Open	A	A	A	A	A	Q1	0 / 0	0–0	–
Monte Carlo Masters	A	A	A	A	A	A	0 / 0	0–0	–
Madrid Open	A	A	A	A	A	A	0 / 0	0–0	–
Italian Open	A	A	A	A	Q1	1R	0 / 1	0–1	0%
Canadian Open	A	A	A	A	2R		0 / 1	1–1	50%
Cincinnati Masters	A	A	A	A	Q2		0 / 0	0–0	–
Shanghai Masters	NH	A	A	Q1	2R		0 / 1	1–1	50%
Paris Masters	A	A	A	A	A		0 / 0	0–0	–
Win–Loss	0–0	0–0	0–0	0–0	2–2	1–2	0 / 4	3–4	43%

== ATP Challenger Tour finals ==
=== Singles: 10 (5 titles, 5 runner-ups) ===
Legend ATP Challenger Tour (5–5)	Finals by surface Hard (2–0) Clay (3–5)

Result	W–L	Date	Tournament	Tier	Surface	Opponent	Score
Win	1–0	Aug 2021	Prague Open, Czechia	Challenger	Clay	(Kazakhstan) Dmitry Popko	6–0, 7–5
Loss	1–1	Apr 2022	Prague Open, Czechia	Challenger	Clay	(Austria) Sebastian Ofner	0–6, 4–6
Loss	1–2	May 2022	Czech Open, Czechia	Challenger	Clay	(Czech Republic) Vít Kopřiva	2–6, 2–6
Win	2–2	Jun 2023	Czech Open, Czechia	Challenger	Clay	(Czech Republic) Tomáš Macháč	6–4, 6–2
Loss	2–3	Jul 2023	Tampere Open, Finland	Challenger	Clay	(India) Sumit Nagal	4–6, 5–7
Win	3–3	Feb 2025	Pune Challenger, India	Challenger	Hard	(United States) Brandon Holt	7–6^{(7–3)}, 6–1
Win	4–3	Apr 2025	Open della Disfida, Italy	Challenger	Clay	(Ukraine) Vitaliy Sachko	7–5, 6–3
Loss	4–4	Jun 2025	Poznań Open, Poland	Challenger	Clay	(Austria) Filip Misolic	2–6, 0–6
Win	5–4	Aug 2025	Europcar Cancún Country Open, Mexico	Challenger	Hard	(Argentina) Thiago Agustín Tirante	6–4, 5–7, 6–4
Loss	5–5	Apr 2026	Garden Open, Italy	Challenger	Clay	(Italy) Andrea Guerrieri	4–6, 6–2, 1–6

=== Doubles: 2 (2 runner-ups) ===
Legend ATP Challenger Tour (0–2)

Result	W–L	Date	Tournament	Tier	Surface	Partner	Opponents	Score
Loss	0–1	Jul 2023	Zug Open, Switzerland	Challenger	Clay	(Turkey) Ergi Kırkın	(France) Théo Arribagé (France) Luca Sanchez	3–6, 5–7
Loss	0–2	Jun 2025	Czech Open, Czechia	Challenger	Clay	(Slovakia) Lukáš Pokorný	(Czech Republic) Petr Nouza (Czech Republic) Patrik Rikl	6–4, 3–6, [4–10]

== ITF World Tennis Tour finals ==
=== Singles: 5 (3 titles, 2 runner-ups) ===
Legend ITF WTT (3–2)	Finals by surface Hard (2–1) Clay (1–1)

Result	W–L	Date	Tournament	Tier	Surface	Opponent	Score
Win	1–0	May 2021	M25 Most, Czechia	WTT	Clay	(Italy) Franco Agamenone	6–4, 7–6^{(7–3)}
Loss	1–1	Mar 2022	M25 Faro, Portugal	WTT	Hard	(France) Clément Tabur	4–6, 2–6
Loss	1–2	Mar 2022	M25 Rovinj, Croatia	WTT	Clay	(Spain) Javier Barranco Cosano	1–6, 1–6
Win	2–2	Nov 2024	M25 Bhubaneswar, India	WTT	Hard	(United States) Nick Chappell	6–2, 6–0
Win	3–2	Nov 2024	M25 Mumbai, India	WTT	Hard	(Uzbekistan) Khumoyun Sultanov	3–6, 6–1, 6–2

== Junior Grand Slam finals ==
=== Doubles: 1 (title) ===
Result	Year	Tournament	Surface	Partner	Opponents	Score
Win	2019	Australian Open	Hard	(Czech Republic) Jonáš Forejtek	(United States) Cannon Kingsley (United States) Emilio Nava	7–6^{(7–5)}, 6–4
