= Jakub Menšík =

Czech tennis player (born 2005)

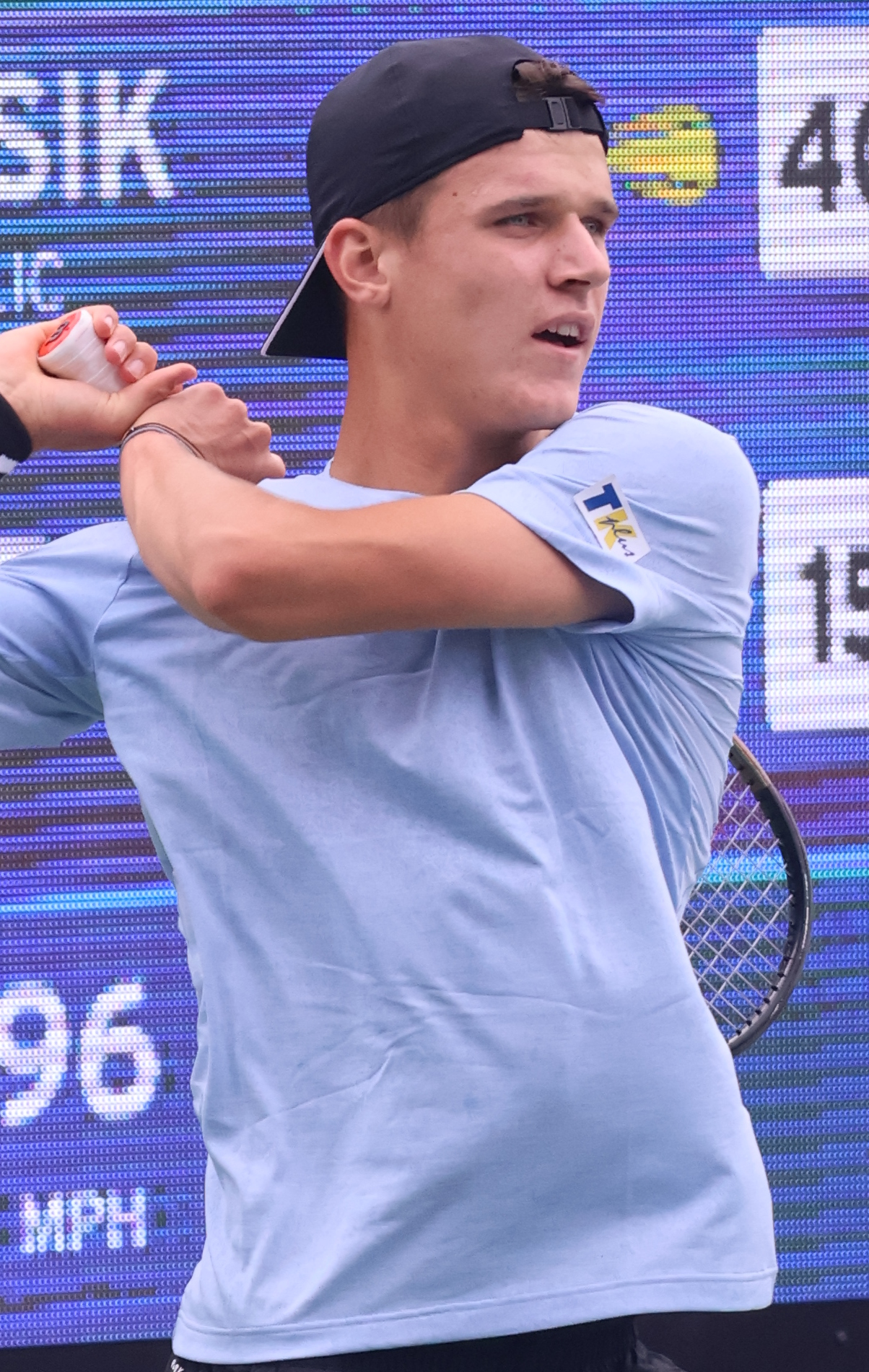
- Menšík at the 2023 US Open
- Country (sports): Czech Republic
- Residence: Prostějov, Czech Republic
- Born: 1 September 2005 (age 21) Prostějov, Czech Republic
- Height: 1.96 m (6 ft 5 in)
- Turned pro: February 2022
- Plays: Right-handed (two-handed backhand)
- Coach: Tomáš Josefus, Jan Pospisil, Sasa Jezdic
- Prize money: US $8,423,265

Singles
- Career record: 98–62
- Career titles: 2
- Highest ranking: No. 12 (2 March 2026)
- Current ranking: No. 15 (16 November 2026)

Grand Slam singles results
- Australian Open: 4R (2026)
- French Open: SF (2026)
- Wimbledon: 3R (2025)
- US Open: 3R (2023, 2024, 2026)

Other tournaments
- Olympic Games: 2R (2024)

Doubles
- Career record: 13–14
- Career titles: 0
- Highest ranking: No. 271 (18 August 2025)
- Current ranking: No. 579 (2 November 2026)

Grand Slam doubles results
- Wimbledon: 1R (2025)

Grand Slam mixed doubles results
- US Open: W (2026)

Team competitions
- Davis Cup: 9–8
- Last updated on: 16 November 2026.

Jakub Menšík (Czech pronunciation: [ˈjakup ˈmɛnʃiːk]; born 1 September 2005) is a Czech professional tennis player. He has a career-high ATP singles ranking of world No. 12, achieved on 2 March 2026, and a doubles ranking of No. 271, achieved on 18 August 2025. Menšík's best result is reaching the semifinal of the 2026 French Open. He is currently the No. 1 Czech singles player.

Menšík has won two ATP Tour singles titles, including an ATP Masters 1000 at the 2025 Miami Open. He represents Czechia at the Davis Cup.

== Early life and background ==
Jakub Menšík was born on September 1 2005 in Prostějov, Czech Republic.

== Career ==
=== 2022: Juniors ===
Menšík was a runner-up in the boys' singles category at the 2022 Australian Open, losing in the final to top-seed Bruno Kuzuhara after suffering from thigh muscle cramps.

He had good results on the ITF junior circuit, maintaining a 85–28 singles win-loss record and reached an ITF junior combined ranking of world No. 2 on 4 April 2022.

=== 2023: Major debut and third round, top 150 ===
In May 2023, Menšík won his first Challenger title at the 2023 Sparta Prague Open, defeating Dominik Koepfer in the final. It was Menšík's sixth ATP Challenger main-draw appearance, and with that title he became the youngest Czech Challenger champion in history – at 17 years old. The only previous 17-year-old Czech champion was former World No. 4 Tomáš Berdych, who captured two Challenger titles in 2003.

Menšík competed in the first qualifying round of the US Open, beating Fabio Fognini 1–6, 6–1, 6–1. He then defeated Leandro Riedi in the second round, and then qualified on his debut for the main draw of a Grand Slam for the first time with a two-set victory against compatriot Zdeněk Kolář. He then won his first Major match defeating Grégoire Barrère, becoming the youngest man since Borna Ćorić in 2014 to win a main draw match at the US Open. He then defeated fellow first-time Major qualifier Titouan Droguet a day before his 18th birthday, before losing to Taylor Fritz in straight sets in the third round. He rose to No. 151 in the rankings and would later reach the top 150.

=== 2024: ATP final & top-10 win, top 50 ===
Menšík qualified for the 2024 Australian Open, making his debut at this Major. He defeated former top 10 player Denis Shapovalov in straight sets but lost to Hubert Hurkacz in five sets in the second round, moving to a new career-high of No. 127 on 29 January 2024.

The young Czech was selected under the new #NextGen programme to compete at an ATP 250 event, the 2024 Qatar ExxonMobil Open. Ranked No. 116, he defeated Alejandro Davidovich Fokina in straight sets to advance to the second round. Next, he defeated Andy Murray in three sets with three tiebreaks to advance to his first ATP quarterfinal. It was the longest match in the history of the tournament lasting 3 hours and 23 minutes. He defeated top seed Andrey Rublev in straight sets, his first ATP top-10 and top-5 win, to advance to his first ATP semifinal. Menšík was the youngest player to defeat a top-5 player since Carlos Alcaraz overcame Stefanos Tsitsipas at the US Open in 2021. He defeated Gaël Monfils in three sets to advance to his first ATP final. As a result, he moved close to 30 positions up in the rankings, becoming the youngest player in the top 100. He lost to second seed Karen Khachanov in the final. Menšík ended the tournament ranked No. 87.

Menšík entered the next Middle East swing tournament, the 2024 Dubai Tennis Championships with a special exempt status where he defeated Borna Ćorić. He also received a wildcard for the 2024 BNP Paribas Open for his Masters debut and recorded his first main draw Masters win over qualifier Hong Seong-chan at this level. At the 2024 Mutua Madrid Open, he reached the third round of a Masters 1000 for the first time defeating top 10 player Grigor Dimitrov but lost to eventual finalist Félix Auger-Aliassime by retirement. Menšík missed the French Open due to an elbow injury.

On his Wimbledon debut, Menšík lost in the first round against 23rd seed Alexander Bublik despite having a two set lead. At the Paris Olympics, Menšík defeated Alexander Shevchenko before losing to 9th seed Tommy Paul.

At the 2024 US Open, Menšík reached the third round for a consecutive year, with wins over 19th seed Félix Auger-Aliassime (for his third top 20 win) and wildcard Tristan Schoolkate (in a fifth set super tiebreak) set. In the third round, he lost to Nuno Borges in five sets despite holding match points.

The Czech reached his first Masters quarterfinal at the 2024 Rolex Shanghai Masters, defeating top 10 players Rublev and Dimitrov. He became the youngest quarterfinalist in the tournament history. He lost to Novak Djokovic in the quarterfinals. Menšík participated in the 2024 Next Gen ATP Finals, ended the year inside the top 50 at No. 48, and won the ATP Newcomer of the Year award.

=== 2025: ATP Masters 1000 title, top 20 ===
Menšík upset sixth-seeded Casper Ruud in the second round of the Australian Open in four sets. He lost in the next round to Alejandro Davidovich Fokina in five sets after leading by two sets and a match point.

Following his second round loss in Indian Wells, Menšík competed at the newly established 175 Challenger 2025 Copa Cap Cana where he reached the semifinals.

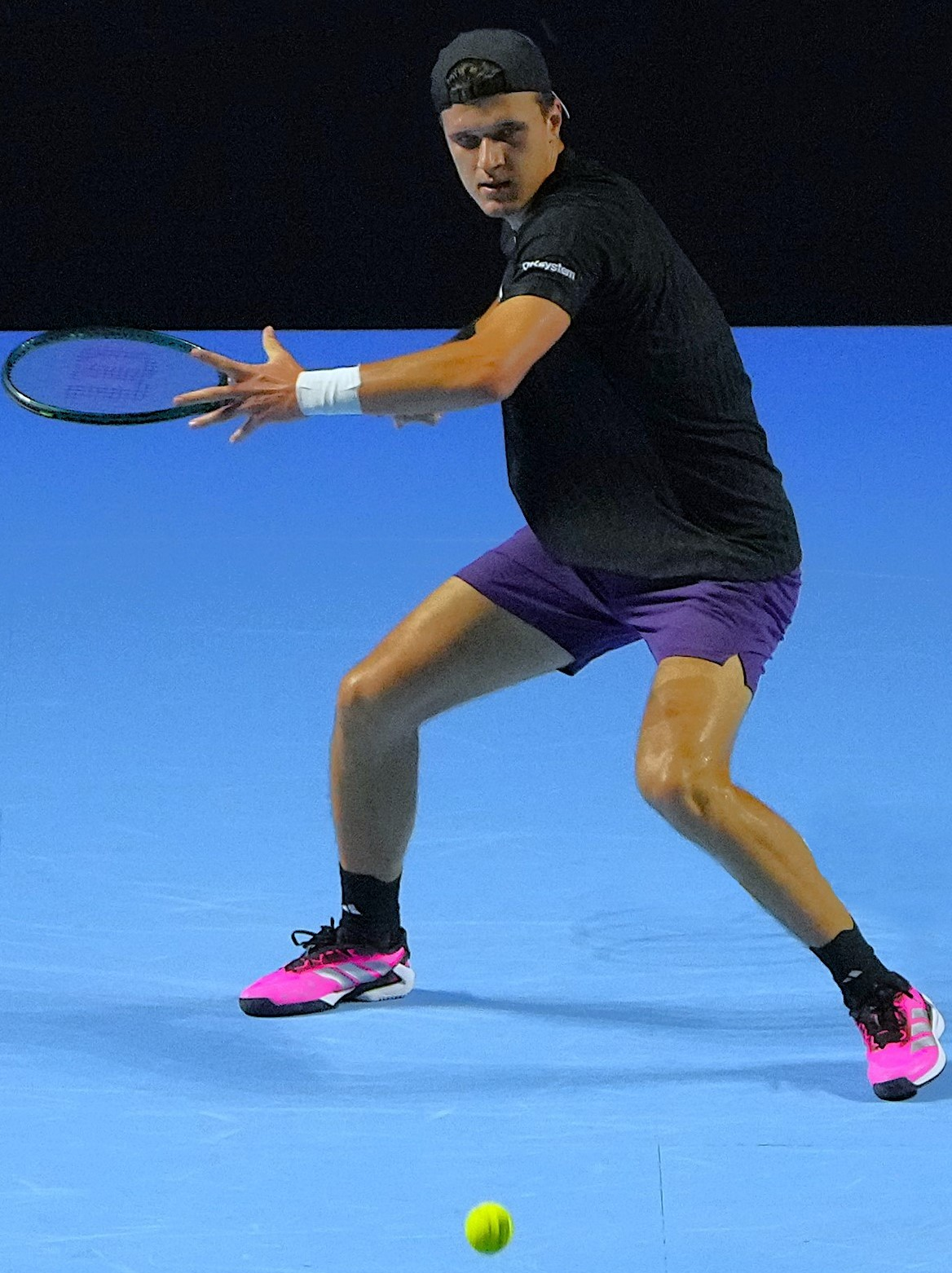
Jakub Menšík, Swiss Indoors Basel 2025

At the 2025 Miami Open, Menšík reached his first Masters semifinal after wins over Indian Wells champion and 6th seed Jack Draper, Roman Safiullin, Tomáš Macháč (by retirement), and 17th seed Arthur Fils. The Czech reached his first Masters final defeating third seed and world No. 4 Taylor Fritz, recording the biggest win of his career by ranking. In the final, he defeated his idol and mentor Novak Djokovic in straight sets with two tiebreaks. The match was delayed by five hours, due to heavy rain and as a result, both players were exhausted from the humidity after the match. During the trophy presentation speech, Menšík mentioned that if it was not for one of the ATP physios, he would have pulled out of the tournament an hour before his first match due to knee pain. Following lifting his first tour-level trophy, he reached the top 25 in the singles rankings on 31 March 2025.

Menšík's Masters win streak was snapped at nine at the Madrid Open, where he lost to Francisco Cerúndolo in the quarterfinals. He reached the fourth round of Rome before losing to Hubert Hurkacz, entering the top 20 at No. 19 on 19 May 2025. At his first French Open appearance, he was upset in the second round by Henrique Rocha after holding a two set lead; nevertheless, he rose to No. 17 after the tournament.

Seeded 15th at Wimbledon, Menšík lost in the third round of Wimbledon to Flavio Cobolli in straight sets. Seeded 16th the US Open, he lost to Ugo Blanchet in the second round in five sets. Ranked as high as 16th during the year, he finished the year at No. 19.

=== 2026: Grand Slam mixed doubles title & singles semifinal, top 15 ===
In the lead up to the Australian Open, Menšík won the second title of his career at Auckland, defeating Sebastián Báez in the final.

Seeded 16th at the Australian Open, Menšík defeated Pablo Carreño Busta, Rafael Jódar, and Ethan Quinn to reach the fourth round of a Slam for the first time. He was forced to withdraw before his match against eventual finalist Novak Djokovic due to an abdominal injury; nevertheless, he rose to world No. 16.

Menšík recorded the biggest win of his career at Doha, defeating world No. 2 Jannik Sinner in the quarterfinals. He lost in the semifinals to Arthur Fils. As a result, he reached a new career-high singles ranking of No. 12 on 2 March 2026.

Seeded 12th and attempting to defend his Miami title, Menšík lost to Frances Tiafoe in the third round despite holding match points. As a result, he fell out of the top 25 in the rankings following the tournament. Seeded 23rd at his next event in Madrid, Menšík reached the fourth round for the second straight year but lost in three sets to 2nd seed Alexander Zverev.

Menšík entered the French Open seeded 26th. After defeating wildcard Titouan Droguet, he defeated Mariano Navone in a fifth set tiebreak on his eighth match point, collapsing on the court afterwards and leaving in a wheelchair. He overcame an 0–6 first set to upset 8th seed Alex de Minaur and advance to the fourth round. In the fourth round, he defeated Andrey Rublev in five sets (after holding a two set lead) to advance to his first major quarterfinal. He took seven match points to defeat fellow NextGen player João Fonseca and advanced to his first Grand Slam semifinal.

At the 2026 US Open Menšík won the US Open mixed doubles titles alongside fellow Czech Karolína Muchová defeating Flavio Cobolli and Belinda Bencic in the final.

== Career statistics ==
=== Grand Slam singles performance timeline ===
Key
W	F	SF	QF	#R	RR	Q#	P#	DNQ	A	Z#	PO	G	S	B	NMS	NTI	P	NH

(W) winner; (F) finalist; (SF) semifinalist; (QF) quarterfinalist; (#R) rounds 4, 3, 2, 1; (RR) round-robin stage; (Q#) qualification round; (P#) preliminary round; (DNQ) did not qualify; (A) absent; (Z#) Davis/Fed Cup Zonal Group (with number indication) or (PO) play-off; (G) gold, (S) silver or (B) bronze Olympic/Paralympic medal; (NMS) not a Masters tournament; (NTI) not a Tier I tournament; (P) postponed; (NH) not held; (SR) strike rate (events won / competed); (W–L) win–loss record.
To avoid confusion and double counting, these charts are updated at the conclusion of a tournament or when the player's participation has ended.

Tournament	2023	2024	2025	2026	SR	W–L	Win %
Australian Open	A	2R	3R	4R (Note: Menšík withdrew from 2026 Australian Open.)	0 / 3	6–2	75%
French Open	A	A	2R	SF	0 / 2	6–2	75%
Wimbledon	A	1R	3R	2R	0 / 3	3–3	50%
US Open	3R	3R	2R	3R	0 / 4	7–4	64%
Win–Loss	2–1	3–3	6–4	11–3	0 / 12	22–11	67%

=== Grand Slam tournaments ===
==== Mixed doubles: 1 (title) ====
Result	Year	Tournament	Surface	Partner	Opponents	Score
Win	2026	US Open	Hard	(Czech Republic) Karolína Muchová	(Switzerland) Belinda Bencic (Italy) Flavio Cobolli	6–3, 1–6, [10–6]

=== ATP 1000 tournaments ===
==== Singles: 1 (title) ====
Result	Year	Tournament	Surface	Opponent	Score
Win	2025	Miami Open	Hard	(Serbia) Novak Djokovic	7–6^{(7–4)}, 7–6^{(7–4)}
