= Michael Vrbenský =

Czech tennis player (born 1999)

- Country (sports): Czech Republic
- Born: 26 December 1999 (age 26) Nymburk, Czech Republic
- Height: 1.83 m (6 ft 0 in)
- Plays: Right-handed (two-handed backhand)
- Prize money: $258,611

Singles
- Career record: 0–1
- Career titles: 0 Challenger, 11 Futures
- Highest ranking: No. 277 (15 July 2024)
- Current ranking: No. 586 (17 November 2025)

Doubles
- Career record: 0–0
- Career titles: 11 Challenger, 13 Futures
- Highest ranking: No. 97 (24 November 2025)
- Current ranking: No. 97 (24 November 2025)
- Last updated on: 24 November 2025.

Michael Vrbenský (born 26 December 1999) is a Czech tennis player. He has a career high ATP singles ranking of world No. 277 achieved on 15 July 2024 and a career high doubles ranking of No. 97 achieved on 24 November 2025. Vrbenský has won 11 ATP Challenger doubles titles, including 7 titles in 2025, tied for the second-most titles for that season.

== Career ==
Vrbenský won 11 ATP Challenger doubles titles, his first titles being with fellow Czech partners at the 2019 Liberec Open and at the 2021 ATP Prague Open with Jonáš Forejtek, at the 2023 Sibiu Open with Andrew Paulson and in 2024 and in 2025 again in Liberec and in Nottingham with Forejtek.

Vrbenský made his ATP main draw singles debut as qualifier at the 2021 Antalya Open with two straight sets victories. He then lost in the first round to former Top 10 member Fabio Fognini in two tight sets. Vrbenský made his Top 100 debut in the doubles rankings on 24 November 2025, after winning two consecutive ATP Challenger titles in Japan, his sixth and seventh of the season.

== ATP Challenger and ITF Tour finals ==
=== Singles: 19 (11–8) ===
Legend (singles) ATP Challenger Tour (0–0) ITF Futures Tour/World Tennis Tour (11–8)	Titles by surface Hard (1–1) Clay (10–6) Grass (0–0) Carpet (0–1)

Result	W–L	Date	Tournament	Tier	Surface	Opponent	Score
Loss	0–1	May 2018	Poland F1, Wisła	Futures	Clay	(Belgium) Zizou Bergs	6–3, 1–6, 2–6
Win	1–1	Jul 2018	Austria F3, Wels	Futures	Clay	(Bosnia and Herzegovina) Nerman Fatić	7–5, 4–6, 6–3
Loss	1–2	Oct 2018	Czech Republic F7, Liberec	Futures	Carpet (i)	(Italy) Julian Ocleppo	6–4, 3–6, 4–6
Win	2–2	Sep 2019	M15 Székesfehérvár, Hungary	World Tennis Tour	Clay	(Croatia) Duje Ajduković	6–2, 6–2
Loss	2–3	Sep 2019	M15 Antalya, Turkey	World Tennis Tour	Clay	(Russia) Ivan Nedelko	6–3, 4–6, 4–6
Win	3–3	Sep 2019	M25+H Říčany, Czech Republic	World Tennis Tour	Clay	(Czech Republic) Vít Kopřiva	6–3, 3–6, 6–2
Win	4–3	Oct 2019	M15 Antalya, Turkey	World Tennis Tour	Clay	(Germany) Peter Heller	7–5, 6–3
Loss	4–4	Oct 2019	M15 Prague, Czech Republic	World Tennis Tour	Hard (i)	(France) Manuel Guinard	6–7^{(3–7)}, 3–6
Loss	4–5	Feb 2020	M15 Antalya, Turkey	World Tennis Tour	Clay	(Italy) Giovanni Fonio	6–4, 4–6, 3–6
Win	5–5	Jul 2022	M15 Bern, Switzerland	World Tennis Tour	Clay	(Germany) Sebastian Prechtel	6–2, 6–3
Win	6–5	Jul 2022	M25 Kassel, Germany	World Tennis Tour	Clay	(Germany) Sebastian Fanselow	7–5, 6–7^{(3–7)}, 6–2
Win	7–5	Sep 2022	M25 Szabolcsveresmart, Hungary	World Tennis Tour	Clay	(Sweden) Dragoș Nicolae Mădăraș	6–1, 7–6^{(8–6)}
Win	8–5	Sep 2022	M15 Budapest, Hungary	World Tennis Tour	Hard	(Hungary) Matyas Füle	6–1, 6–3
Win	9–5	Sep 2023	M25 Maribor, Slovenia	World Tennis Tour	Clay	(Brazil) Nicolas Zanellato	6–3, 6–4
Loss	9–6	Sep 2023	M25 Maribor, Slovenia	World Tennis Tour	Clay	(Argentina) Juan Bautista Torres	4–6, 5–7
Loss	9–7	Oct 2023	M25 Telavi, Georgia	World Tennis Tour	Clay	(Czech Republic) Martin Krumich	3–6, 7–6^{(9–7)}, 4–6
Win	10–7	Apr 2024	M15 Split, Croatia	World Tennis Tour	Clay	(Croatia) Luka Mikrut	7–5, 7–6^{(7–3)}
Win	11–7	Jun 2024	M15 Saarlouis, Germany	World Tennis Tour	Clay	(Germany) Lucas Gerch	6–3, 7–6^{(7–3)}
Loss	11–8	Aug 2024	M25 Poznań, Poland	World Tennis Tour	Clay	(Poland) Daniel Michalski	7–5, 4–6, 4–6

=== Doubles: 39 (26–13) ===
Legend (doubles) ATP Challenger Tour (13–5) ITF Futures Tour (13–8)	Titles by surface Hard (7–1) Clay (18–11) Grass (0–0) Carpet (1–1)

Result	W–L	Date	Tournament	Tier	Surface	Partner	Opponents	Score
Loss	0–1	Nov 2017	Czech Republic F10, Prague	Futures	Hard (i)	(Czech Republic) Matěj Vocel	(Poland) Karol Drzewiecki (Poland) Szymon Walków	6–3, 3–6, [8–10]
Loss	0–2	Feb 2018	Switzerland F1, Oberentfelden	Futures	Carpet (i)	(Czech Republic) Jan Mertl	(Switzerland) Marc-Andrea Hüsler (Switzerland) Jakub Paul	6–4, 6–7^{(7–9)}, [8–10]
Win	1–2	May 2018	Czech Republic F2, Jablonec nad Nisou	Futures	Clay	(Czech Republic) Filip Duda	(Czech Republic) Patrik Rikl (Czech Republic) Petr Nouza	6–3, 4–6, [10–5]
Loss	1–3	Jun 2018	Czech Republic F3, Most	Futures	Clay	(Czech Republic) Tomáš Macháč	(Czech Republic) Patrik Rikl (Czech Republic) Petr Michnev	2–6, 6–2, [7–10]
Win	2–3	Jul 2018	Austria F3, Wels	Futures	Clay	(Czech Republic) Filip Duda	(Czech Republic) David Škoch (Czech Republic) Petr Nouza	7–5, 7–6^{(7–5)}
Win	3–3	Feb 2019	M25 Oberentfelden, Switzerland	Futures	Carpet (i)	(Czech Republic) Marek Jaloviec	(France) Albano Olivetti (Israel) Edan Leshem	7–5, 6–1
Loss	3–4	Jun 2019	M15 Kaltenkirchen, Germany	Futures	Clay	(Czech Republic) Petr Nouza	(Brazil) Daniel Dutra da Silva (Sweden) Christian Lindell	3–6, 0–6
Win	4–4	Aug 2019	Liberec, Czech Republic	Challenger	Clay	(Czech Republic) Jonáš Forejtek	(Serbia) Nikola Ćaćić (Croatia) Antonio Šančić	6–4, 6–3
Win	5–4	Sep 2019	M15 Székesfehérvár, Hungary	Futures	Clay	(Czech Republic) Petr Nouza	(Ukraine) Danylo Kalenichenko (Austria) David Pichler	5–7, 6–1, [17–15]
Win	6–4	Sep 2019	M25+H Říčany, Czech Republic	Futures	Clay	(Czech Republic) Jonáš Forejtek	(Czech Republic) Petr Nouza (Netherlands) Niels Lootsma	7–6^{(7–4)}, 7–6^{(7–5)}
Win	7–4	Nov 2019	M15 Prague, Czech Republic	Futures	Hard (i)	(Czech Republic) Marek Gengel	(Czech Republic) Vít Kopřiva (Czech Republic) Jaroslav Pospíšil	2–6, 6–3, [10–6]
Win	8–4	Feb 2020	M15 Antalya, Turkey	Futures	Clay	(Poland) Daniel Michalski	(Netherlands) Max Houkes (Spain) David Jordà Sanchis	6–1, 2–6, [12–10]
Win	9–4	Mar 2020	M25 Antalya, Turkey	Futures	Clay	(Czech Republic) Jonáš Forejtek	(Hungary) Fábián Marozsán (Hungary) Péter Nagy	6–3, 6–4
Win	10–4	Apr 2021	M25 Meerbusch, Germany	World Tennis Tour	Clay	(Czech Republic) Jiří Lehečka	(Norway) Viktor Durasovic (Sweden) Markus Eriksson	6–3, 6–3
Win	11-4	Aug 2021	Prague, Czech Republic	Challenger	Clay	(Czech Republic) Jonáš Forejtek	(Russia) Evgeny Karlovskiy (Russia) Evgenii Tiurnev	6-1, 6–4
Win	12–4	Feb 2022	M25 Vale do Lobo, Portugal	World Tennis Tour	Hard	(Czech Republic) Dalibor Svrčina	(Portugal) Francisco Cabral (Germany) Peter Heller	3–6, 6–4, [10–7]
Loss	12–5	Mar 2022	M25 Opatija, Croatia	World Tennis Tour	Clay	(Italy) Riccardo Bonadio	(Croatia) Zvonimir Babić (Greece) Petros Tsitsipas	3–6, 6–4, [8–10]
Loss	12–6	Jun 2022	M15 Sarajevo, Bosnia & Herzegovina	World Tennis Tour	Clay	(France) Constantin Bittoun Kouzmine	(Bulgaria) Alexander Donski (Austria) David Pichler	7–5, 6–7^{(2–7)}, [10–12]
Win	13–6	Sep 2022	M25 Szabolcsveresmart, Hungary	World Tennis Tour	Clay	(Czech Republic) Andrew Paulson	(Ukraine) Georgii Kravchenko (Czech Republic) Petr Nouza	6–3, 3–6, [10–8]
Win	14–6	Sep 2022	M15 Budapest, Hungary	World Tennis Tour	Hard	(Czech Republic) Antonin Bolardt	(Czech Republic) Matthew William Donald (United Kingdom) Matthew Southcombe	6–4, 7–5
Win	15–6	Feb 2023	M25 Vila Real de Santo Antonio, Portugal	World Tennis Tour	Hard	(Czech Republic) Matěj Vocel	(Denmark) August Holmgren (Denmark) Christian Sigsgaard	6–4, 6–2
Win	16–6	Sep 2023	Sibiu, Romania	Challenger	Clay	(Czech Republic) Andrew Paulson	(Poland) Piotr Matuszewski (Germany) Kai Wehnelt	6–2, 6–2
Loss	16–7	Apr 2024	M15 Dubrovnik, Croatia	World Tennis Tour	Clay	(Austria) David Pichler	(Austria) Neil Oberleitner (Germany) Adrian Oetzbach	6–7^{(2–7)}, 3–6
Loss	16–8	May 2024	Tunis, Tunisia	Challenger	Clay	(Czech Republic) Patrik Rikl	(Argentina) Federico Agustin Gómez (United Kingdom) Marcus Willis	6–4, 1–6, [6–10]
Loss	16–9	May 2024	Augsburg, Germany	Challenger	Clay	(Austria) David Pichler	(Germany) Jakob Schnaitter (Germany) Mark Wallner	6–3, 2–6, [8–10]
Win	17–9	Jul 2024	Liberec, Czech Republic	Challenger	Clay	(Czech Republic) Jonáš Forejtek	(Slovakia) Miloš Karol (Slovakia) Tomáš Lánik	7–5, 6–7^{(5–7)}, [10–4]
Loss	17–10	Aug 2024	M15 Poznań, Poland	World Tennis Tour	Clay	(Czech Republic) Jiří Barnát	(Poland) Szymon Kielan (Poland) Filip Pieczonka	3–6, 0–6
Win	18–10	Jan 2025	Nottingham, UK	Challenger	Hard (i)	(Czech Republic) Jonáš Forejtek	(Czech Republic) Jiří Barnát (Czech Republic) Filip Duda	7–6^{(7–5)}, 7–6^{(7–5)}
Win	19–10	May 2025	Tunis, Tunisia	Challenger	Clay	(Czech Republic) Hynek Bartoň	(India) Siddhant Banthia (Bulgaria) Alexander Donski	5–7, 6–4, [10–7]
Win	20–10	May 2025	Skopje, North Macedonia	Challenger	Clay	(Czech Republic) Andrew Paulson	(India) Sriram Balaji (Mexico) Miguel Ángel Reyes-Varela	2–6, 6–4, [10–6]
Win	21–10	Jul 2025	Liberec, Czech Republic	Challenger	Clay	(Czech Republic) Andrew Paulson	(Czech Republic) Jiří Barnát (Czech Republic) Filip Duda	6–4, 6–1
Win	22–10	Aug 2025	Cordenos, Italy	Challenger	Clay	(Czech Republic) Andrew Paulson	(Bolivia) Boris Arias (Bolivia) Murkel Dellien	6–4, 6–2
Win	23–10	Nov 2025	Kobe, Japan	Challenger	Hard	(Austria) Neil Oberleitner	(Thailand) Pruchya Isaro (India) Niki Kaliyanda Poonacha	6–7^{(1–7)}, 7–6^{(10–8)}, [10–4]
Win	24–10	Nov 2025	Yokohama, Japan	Challenger	Hard	(Austria) Neil Oberleitner	(Japan) Masamichi Imamura (Japan) Ryuki Matsuda	7–6^{(8–6)}, 6–1
Win	25–10	Apr 2026	Madrid, Spain	Challenger	Clay	(Czech Republic) Andrew Paulson	(United States) George Goldhoff (United States) Trey Hilderbrand	2–6, 6–4, [10–8]
Loss	25–11	May 2026	Tunis, Tunisia	Challenger	Clay	(Czech Republic) Hynek Bartoň	(Spain) Sergio Martos Gornés (Poland) Szymon Walków	6–1, 5–7, [8–10]
Loss	25–12	Jun 2026	Târgu Mureș, Romania	Challenger	Clay	(Serbia) Stefan Latinović	(Netherlands) Thijmen Loof (Japan) Kaito Uesugi	6–2, 6–7^{(0–7)}, [6–10]
Win	26–12	Jun 2026	Brașov, România	Challenger	Clay	(Austria) Maximilian Neuchrist	(Spain) Iñigo Cervantes (Ukraine) Denys Molchanov	6–3, 3–6, [10–4]
Loss	26–13	Sep 2026	Genoa, Italy	Challenger	Clay	(Finland) Patrik Niklas-Salminen	(Spain) Íñigo Cervantes (Ukraine) Denys Molchanov	2–6, 7–6^{(8–6)}, [7–10]

== Junior Grand Slam finals ==
=== Doubles: 1 (1 runner-up) ===
Result	Year	Tournament	Surface	Partner	Opponents	Score
Runner-up	2017	Wimbledon	Grass	(Austria) Jurij Rodionov	(Chinese Taipei) Hsu Yu-hsiou (Argentina) Axel Geller	4–6, 4–6
