= Sparta Prague Open Challenger =

Sparta Prague Open

Defunct tennis tournament
- Event name: Sparta Prague Open
- Location: Prague, Czech Republic
- Venue: TK Sparta Prague
- Category: ATP Challenger Tour; WTA 125K series (2020)
- Surface: Clay
- Website: tkspartapraha.cz

The Sparta Prague Open was a professional tennis tournament played on clay courts held in Prague, Czech Republic at TK Sparta Prague, founded in 1905 near Stromovka, inside Prague's Bubeneč district. It was part of the Association of Tennis Professionals (ATP) Challenger Tour from 2000 until 2023. A one-time WTA 125 series event was held as the TK Sparta Prague Open at the TK Sparta Prague.

== Past finals ==
=== Men ===
==== Singles ====
| Year | Champion | Runner-up | Score |
|---|---|---|---|
| 2000 | (Spain) Albert Montañés | (Italy) Filippo Volandri | 6–1, 6–1 |
| 2001–2013 | Not held | | |
| 2014 | (Czech Republic) Lukáš Rosol | (Czech Republic) Jiří Veselý | 3–6, 6–4, 6–4 |
| 2015 | (Slovakia) Norbert Gombos | (Spain) Albert Montañés | 7–6^{(7–5)}, 5–7, 7–6^{(7–2)} |
| 2016 | (Czech Republic) Adam Pavlásek | (France) Stéphane Robert | 6–4, 3–6, 6–3 |
| 2017–2020 | Not held | | |
| 2021 | (Czech Republic) Dalibor Svrčina | (Kazakhstan) Dmitry Popko | 6–0, 7–5 |
| 2022 | (Austria) Sebastian Ofner | (Czech Republic) Dalibor Svrčina | 6–0, 6–4 |
| 2023 | (Czech Republic) Jakub Menšík | (Germany) Dominik Koepfer | 6–4, 6–3 |

==== Doubles ====
| Year | Champions | Runners-up | Score |
|---|---|---|---|
| 2000 | (Czech Republic) František Čermák (Czech Republic) Ota Fukárek | (Czech Republic) Tomáš Cibulec (Czech Republic) Leoš Friedl | 6–4, 6–3 |
| 2001–2013 | Not held | | |
| 2014 | (Czech Republic) Roman Jebavý (Czech Republic) Jiří Veselý | (Chinese Taipei) Lee Hsin-han (China) Zhang Ze | 6–1, 6–3 |
| 2015 | (Poland) Mateusz Kowalczyk (Slovakia) Igor Zelenay | (Venezuela) Roberto Maytín (Mexico) Miguel Ángel Reyes-Varela | 6–2, 7–6^{(7–5)} |
| 2016 | (Poland) Tomasz Bednarek (Croatia) Nikola Mektić | (Czech Republic) Zdeněk Kolář (Czech Republic) Matěj Vocel | 6–4, 5–7, [10–7] |
| 2017–2020 | Not held | | |
| 2021 | (Czech Republic) Jonáš Forejtek (Czech Republic) Michael Vrbenský | (Russia) Evgeny Karlovskiy (Russia) Evgenii Tiurnev | 6–1, 6–4 |
| 2022 | (Portugal) Francisco Cabral (Poland) Szymon Walków | (France) Tristan Lamasine (France) Lucas Pouille | 6–2, 7–6^{(14–12)} |
| 2023 | (France) Dan Added (France) Albano Olivetti | (Latvia) Miķelis Lībietis (United States) Hunter Reese | 6–4, 6–3 |

=== Women ===
==== Singles ====
| Year | Champion | Runner-up | Score |
|---|---|---|---|
| 2020 (Note: Held as TK Sparta Prague Open) | (Slovakia) Kristína Kučová | (Italy) Elisabetta Cocciaretto | 6–4, 6–3 |

==== Doubles ====
| Year | Champions | Runners-up | Score |
|---|---|---|---|
| 2020 (Note: Held as TK Sparta Prague Open) | (Belarus) Lidziya Marozava (Romania) Andreea Mitu | (Italy) Giulia Gatto-Monticone (Argentina) Nadia Podoroska | 6–4, 6–4 |

== See also ==
- I.ČLTK Prague Open
- WTA Prague Open
