= 2022 IBG Prague Open – Doubles =

Doubles
- 2022 IBG Prague Open

Final
- Champions: (Romania) Victor Vlad Cornea (Czech Republic) Andrew Paulson
- Runners-up: (Bulgaria) Adrian Andreev (Bolivia) Murkel Dellien
- Score: 6–3, 6–1

Events
Singles	Doubles
← 2021 ·	IBG Prague Open	· 2023 →

Victor Vlad Cornea and Petros Tsitsipas were the defending champions. However, only Cornea chose to defend his title; he partnered with Andrew Paulson. They went on to win the title, defeating Adrian Andreev and Murkel Dellien 6–3, 6–1 in the final.

== Seeds ==
1. (Romania) Victor Vlad Cornea / (Czech Republic) Andrew Paulson (champions)
2. (Poland) Karol Drzewiecki / (Finland) Patrik Niklas-Salminen (quarterfinals)
3. (Uruguay) Martín Cuevas / (Spain) Adrián Menéndez Maceiras (semifinals)
4. (Czech Republic) Marek Gengel / (Czech Republic) Lukáš Rosol (first round)

== Draw ==
=== Key ===
- Q = Qualifier
- WC = Wild card
- LL = Lucky loser
- Alt = Alternate
- ITF = ITF entry
- PR = Protected ranking
- SR = Special ranking
- SE = Special exempt
- JE = Junior exempt
- JR = Junior Accelerator Programme entrant
- CO = College Accelerator Programme entrant
- NG = Next Gen Accelerator Program entrant
- w/o = Walkover
- r = Retired
- d = Defaulted

First round
1	(Romania) VV Cornea (Czech Republic) A Paulson	7^{7}	3	[14]
Alt	(Switzerland) J Paul (Czech Republic) M Vrbenský	6^{3}	6	[12]
(Italy) F Forti (Italy) M Gigante	2	7	[8]
WC	(Czech Republic) J Menšík (Czech Republic) Jakub Nicod	6	5	[10]
3	(Uruguay) M Cuevas (Spain) A Menéndez Maceiras	6	6
(Germany) C Frantzen (Germany) H Squire	3	2
(Uzbekistan) S Fayziev (Ukraine) O Krutykh	6	6^{5}	[18]
(Spain) O Roca Batalla (Germany) Timo Stodder	4	7^{7}	[16]
WC	(Czech Republic) P Nouza (Czech Republic) M Vocel	6^{5}	6^{5}
(Bulgaria) A Andreev (Bolivia) M Dellien	7^{7}	7^{7}
(Romania) M Copil (Romania) A Jecan	6	1	[10]
4	(Czech Republic) M Gengel (Czech Republic) L Rosol	4	6	[7]
(France) K de Schepper (Portugal) J Domingues	5	5
(Slovakia) M Karol (Ukraine) V Sachko	7	7
(Argentina) RA Burruchaga (Argentina) M Navone	7^{7}	4	[9]
2	(Poland) K Drzewiecki (Finland) P Niklas-Salminen	6^{5}	6	[11]

Quarterfinals
1	(Romania) VV Cornea (Czech Republic) A Paulson	7^{7}	6^{7}	[10]
WC	(Czech Republic) J Menšík (Czech Republic) J Nicod	6^{5}	7^{9}	[5]
3	(Uruguay) M Cuevas (Spain) A Menéndez Maceiras	5	6	[10]
(Uzbekistan) S Fayziev (Ukraine) O Krutykh	7	4	[7]
(Bulgaria) A Andreev (Bolivia) M Dellien	7	2	[10]
(Romania) M Copil (Romania) A Jecan	5	6	[6]
(Slovakia) M Karol (Ukraine) V Sachko	6	6
2	(Poland) K Drzewiecki (Finland) P Niklas-Salminen	1	3

Semifinals
1	(Romania) VV Cornea (Czech Republic) A Paulson	6	6
3	(Uruguay) M Cuevas (Spain) A Menéndez Maceiras	4	1
(Bulgaria) A Andreev (Bolivia) M Dellien	4	6	[10]
(Slovakia) M Karol (Ukraine) V Sachko	6	4	[8]

Final
1	(Romania) VV Cornea (Czech Republic) A Paulson	6	6
(Bulgaria) A Andreev (Bolivia) M Dellien	3	1
