= 2022 IBG Prague Open – Singles =

Singles
- 2022 IBG Prague Open

Final
- Champion: (Ukraine) Oleksii Krutykh
- Runner-up: (Germany) Lucas Gerch
- Score: 6–3, 6–7^{(2–7)}, 6–2

Events
Singles	Doubles
- IBG Prague Open

Franco Agamenone was the defending champion but chose not to defend his title.

Oleksii Krutykh won the title after defeating Lucas Gerch 6–3, 6–7^{(2–7)}, 6–2 in the final.

== Seeds ==
1. (Italy) Matteo Gigante (quarterfinals)
2. (Ukraine) Oleksii Krutykh (champion)
3. (Ukraine) Vitaliy Sachko (second round)
4. (Spain) Oriol Roca Batalla (first round)
5. (Germany) Henri Squire (second round)
6. (Turkey) Ergi Kırkın (first round)
7. (Turkey) Cem İlkel (first round)
8. (United States) Nicolas Moreno de Alboran (quarterfinals)

== Draw ==
Key

- Q = Qualifier
- WC = Wild card
- LL = Lucky loser
- Alt = Alternate
- ITF = ITF entry
- PR = Protected ranking
- SR = Special ranking
- SE = Special exempt
- JE = Junior exempt
- JR = Junior Accelerator Programme entrant
- CO = College Accelerator Programme entrant
- NG = Next Gen Accelerator Program entrant
- w/o = Walkover
- r = Retired
- d = Defaulted

=== Finals ===
Semifinals
(Germany) Lucas Gerch	6	4	6
Q	(Portugal) João Domingues	4	6	3
WC	(Czech Republic) Jakub Menšík	5	3
2	(Ukraine) Oleksii Krutykh	7	6

Final
(Germany) Lucas Gerch	3	7^{7}	2
2	(Ukraine) Oleksii Krutykh	6	6^{2}	6

=== Top half ===
First round
1	(Italy) M Gigante	7^{7}	2	6
(Argentina) RA Burruchaga	6^{5}	6	2
Q	(Czech Republic) M Vrbenský	7	7^{7}
(France) K de Schepper	5	6^{5}
(Bulgaria) A Andreev	6	6
(Germany) M Rosenkranz	3	3
(Germany) Lucas Gerch	6	6
7	(Turkey) C İlkel	4	2
3	(Ukraine) V Sachko	6	6
(Bolivia) M Dellien	2	1
WC	(Czech Republic) M Vocel	3	1
Q	(Portugal) J Domingues	6	6
(France) A Fils	4	1
(Argentina) M Navone	6	6
(Austria) L Neumayer	1	4
5	(Germany) H Squire	6	6

Second round
1	(Italy) M Gigante	6	6
Q	(Czech Republic) M Vrbenský	2	3
(Bulgaria) A Andreev	4	4
(Germany) L Gerch	6	6
3	(Ukraine) V Sachko	5	5
Q	(Portugal) J Domingues	7	7
(Argentina) M Navone	7	6
5	(Germany) H Squire	5	1

Quarterfinals
1	(Italy) M Gigante	5	2
(Germany) L Gerch	7	6
Q	(Portugal) J Domingues	7^{7}	6
(Argentina) M Navone	6^{3}	3

Semifinals
(Germany) L Gerch	6	4	6
Q	(Portugal) J Domingues	4	6	3

=== Bottom half ===
First round
6	(Turkey) E Kırkın	6	4	6^{1}
(Czech Republic) L Rosol	4	6	7^{7}
Q	(Spain) A Menéndez Maceiras	3	0^{r}
WC	(Czech Republic) J Menšík	6	4
Q	(Uruguay) M Cuevas	2	6	6
Q	(Czech Republic) M Krumich	6	3	3
Alt	(Czech Republic) M Gengel	6	6^{4}	6
4	(Spain) O Roca Batalla	4	7^{7}	3
8	(United States) N Moreno de Alboran	6	3	7
(Spain) A Moro Cañas	3	6	5
(France) Alexis Gautier	4	1
(Belgium) R Collignon	6	6
WC	(Czech Republic) P Nouza	6	6^{3}	6
Q	(Romania) VV Cornea	3	7^{7}	2
(Romania) M Copil	1	6	6^{5}
2	(Ukraine) O Krutykh	6	4	7^{7}

Second round
(Czech Republic) L Rosol	2	4
WC	(Czech Republic) J Menšík	6	6
Q	(Uruguay) M Cuevas	6	6
Alt	(Czech Republic) M Gengel	0	1
8	(United States) N Moreno de Alboran	7	5	7
(Belgium) R Collignon	5	7	5
WC	(Czech Republic) P Nouza	3	4
2	(Ukraine) O Krutykh	6	6

Quarterfinals
WC	(Czech Republic) J Menšík	7	6
Q	(Uruguay) M Cuevas	5	2
8	(United States) N Moreno de Alboran	4	6	6^{8}
2	(Ukraine) O Krutykh	6	3	7^{10}

Semifinals
WC	(Czech Republic) J Menšík	5	3
2	(Ukraine) O Krutykh	7	6
