= 2021 IBG Prague Open – Singles =

Singles
- 2021 IBG Prague Open

Final
- Champion: (Italy) Franco Agamenone
- Runner-up: (United Kingdom) Ryan Peniston
- Score: 6–3, 6–1

Events
Singles	Doubles
- IBG Prague Open

Aslan Karatsev was the defending champion but chose not to defend his title.

Franco Agamenone won the title after defeating Ryan Peniston 6–3, 6–1 in the final.

== Seeds ==
1. (Russia) Evgeny Karlovskiy (quarterfinals)
2. (United States) Alexander Ritschard (second round)
3. (Russia) Evgenii Tiurnev (first round)
4. (France) Geoffrey Blancaneaux (second round)
5. (Czech Republic) Jonáš Forejtek (first round)
6. (Belgium) Michael Geerts (quarterfinals)
7. (Romania) Filip Jianu (first round)
8. (Serbia) Miljan Zekić (first round, retired)

== Draw ==
Key

- Q = Qualifier
- WC = Wild card
- LL = Lucky loser
- Alt = Alternate
- ITF = ITF entry
- PR = Protected ranking
- SR = Special ranking
- SE = Special exempt
- JE = Junior exempt
- JR = Junior Accelerator Programme entrant
- CO = College Accelerator Programme entrant
- NG = Next Gen Accelerator Program entrant
- w/o = Walkover
- r = Retired
- d = Defaulted

=== Finals ===
Semifinals
(Argentina) Genaro Alberto Olivieri	1	5
(United Kingdom) Ryan Peniston	6	7
(Italy) Franco Agamenone	6	6
(Netherlands) Igor Sijsling	3	0

Final
(United Kingdom) Ryan Peniston	3	1
(Italy) Franco Agamenone	6	6

=== Top half ===
First round
1	(Russia) E Karlovskiy	6	6
(Argentina) H Casanova	2	3
(Germany) R Molleker	7	4	6
WC	(Czech Republic) A Paulson	5	6	1
(Chinese Taipei) Y-h Hsu	6	6
(Russia) A Vatutin	3	0
(Argentina) GA Olivieri	6	6
5	(Czech Republic) J Forejtek	2	4
3	(Russia) E Tiurnev	6^{6}	2
(Croatia) M Pecotić	7^{8}	6
Q	(Argentina) F Díaz Acosta	6	6
PR	(Italy) M Donati	1	3
Q	(Hungary) Z Piros	4	3
Q	(Belarus) U Ignatik	6	6
(United Kingdom) R Peniston	6	4
8	(Serbia) M Zekić	0	1^{r}

Second round
1	(Russia) E Karlovskiy	5	6	6
(Germany) R Molleker	7	4	2
(Chinese Taipei) Y-h Hsu	3	4
(Argentina) GA Olivieri	6	6
(Croatia) M Pecotić	3	6^{7}
Q	(Argentina) F Díaz Acosta	6	7^{9}
Q	(Belarus) U Ignatik	2	6	3
(United Kingdom) R Peniston	6	2	6

Quarterfinals
1	(Russia) E Karlovskiy	7^{8}	4	4
(Argentina) GA Olivieri	6^{6}	6	6
Q	(Argentina) F Díaz Acosta	3	1
(United Kingdom) R Peniston	6	6

Semifinals
(Argentina) GA Olivieri	1	5
(United Kingdom) R Peniston	6	7

=== Bottom half ===
First round
6	(Belgium) M Geerts	6	6
WC	(Czech Republic) M Krumich	2	4
(Germany) J Härteis	4	2
Q	(United States) A Rybakov	6	6
(Spain) N Sánchez Izquierdo	3	3
(Italy) F Agamenone	6	6
(France) A Cazaux	4	6^{6}
4	(France) G Blancaneaux	6	7^{8}
7	(Romania) FC Jianu	6^{4}	2
(Brazil) M Pucinelli de Almeida	7^{7}	6
WC	(Czech Republic) D Siniakov	4	3
(Netherlands) I Sijsling	6	6
(Japan) K Uchida	6	3	6
(United States) N Chappell	4	6	1
(Spain) R Ortega Olmedo	1	1
2	(United States) A Ritschard	6	6

Second round
6	(Belgium) M Geerts	6	6
Q	(United States) A Rybakov	2	2
(Italy) F Agamenone	7	6
4	(France) G Blancaneaux	5	4
(Brazil) M Pucinelli de Almeida	2	6	2^{r}
(Netherlands) I Sijsling	6	2	3
(Japan) K Uchida	7^{7}	7
2	(United States) A Ritschard	6^{4}	5

Quarterfinals
6	(Belgium) M Geerts	7	5	3
(Italy) F Agamenone	5	7	6
(Netherlands) I Sijsling	7	6
(Japan) K Uchida	5	3

Semifinals
(Italy) F Agamenone	6	6
(Netherlands) I Sijsling	3	0
