= 2023 IBG Prague Open – Singles =

Singles
- 2023 IBG Prague Open

Final
- Champion: (Germany) Rudolf Molleker
- Runner-up: (France) Gabriel Debru
- Score: 6–2, 6–2

Events
Singles	Doubles
← 2022 ·	IBG Prague Open	· 2024 →

Oleksii Krutykh was the defending champion but chose not to defend his title.

Rudolf Molleker won the title after defeating Gabriel Debru 6–2, 6–2 in the final.

== Seeds ==
1. (Austria) Lukas Neumayer (first round)
2. (Italy) Francesco Maestrelli (first round)
3. (Italy) Luciano Darderi (quarterfinals)
4. (Germany) Rudolf Molleker (champion)
5. (Portugal) João Sousa (semifinals)
6. (Germany) Henri Squire (first round)
7. (France) Mathias Bourgue (first round)
8. (Monaco) Valentin Vacherot (semifinals)

== Draw ==
=== Key ===
- Q = Qualifier
- WC = Wild card
- LL = Lucky loser
- Alt = Alternate
- ITF = ITF entry
- PR = Protected ranking
- SR = Special ranking
- SE = Special exempt
- JE = Junior exempt
- JR = Junior Accelerator Programme entrant
- CO = College Accelerator Programme entrant
- NG = Next Gen Accelerator Program entrant
- w/o = Walkover
- r = Retired
- d = Defaulted

=== Finals ===
Semifinals
Q	(France) Gabriel Debru	5	6	6
5	(Portugal) João Sousa	7	3	4
4	(Germany) Rudolf Molleker	6	7^{7}
8	(Monaco) Valentin Vacherot	4	6^{5}

Final
Q	(France) Gabriel Debru	2	2
4	(Germany) Rudolf Molleker	6	6

=== Top half ===
First round
1	(Austria) L Neumayer	6	3	4
Q	(France) G Debru	2	6	6
WC	(Czech Republic) H Bartoň	6	3	2
Q	(Czech Republic) Jakub Nicod	1	6	6
(France) C Hemery	4	6	2
WC	(United States) T Kodat	6	1	6
(Switzerland) H Laaksonen	4	7^{7}	6
7	(France) M Bourgue	6	6^{3}	2
3	(Italy) L Darderi	6	6^{7}	7^{7}
(France) M Janvier	3	7^{9}	6^{5}
Q	(Czech Republic) M Vrbenský	6	7
(Spain) D Jordà Sanchis	3	5
WC	(Czech Republic) J Forejtek	6	3	6
(Spain) J Barranco Cosano	4	6	4
(France) V Royer	4	1
5	(Portugal) J Sousa	6	6

Second round
Q	(France) G Debru	7	6
Q	(Czech Republic) J Nicod	5	1
WC	(United States) T Kodat	6	6
(Switzerland) H Laaksonen	3	3
3	(Italy) L Darderi	6	6
Q	(Czech Republic) M Vrbenský	4	1
WC	(Czech Republic) J Forejtek	0	6	4
5	(Portugal) J Sousa	6	4	6

Quarterfinals
Q	(France) G Debru	7^{7}	6^{3}	6
WC	(United States) T Kodat	6^{4}	7^{7}	4
3	(Italy) L Darderi	5	6	6^{3}
5	(Portugal) J Sousa	7	3	7^{7}

Semifinals
Q	(France) G Debru	5	6	6
5	(Portugal) J Sousa	7	3	4

=== Bottom half ===
First round
6	(Germany) H Squire	6	4	3
Q	(Argentina) FA Gómez	4	6	6
(Italy) L Giustino	6	6
(Romania) FC Jianu	4	3
(Czech Republic) M Gengel	2	2
(France) M Chazal	6	6
(Czech Republic) L Rosol	3	4
4	(Germany) R Molleker	6	6
8	(Monaco) V Vacherot	6	6
Q	Kirill Kivattsev	4	4
(Argentina) F Mena	7	6
PR	(Spain) Carlos López Montagud	5	3
(Czech Republic) A Paulson	6	6
Q	(Poland) Paweł Ciaś	4	4
(France) Mathys Erhard	7^{7}	5	6
2	(Italy) F Maestrelli	6^{0}	7	3

Second round
Q	(Argentina) FA Gómez	6	6
(Italy) L Giustino	3	3
(France) M Chazal	2	2
4	(Germany) R Molleker	6	6
8	(Monaco) V Vacherot	6	6
(Argentina) F Mena	2	4
(Czech Republic) A Paulson	6	6
(France) M Erhard	3	3

Quarterfinals
Q	(Argentina) FA Gómez	3	3
4	(Germany) R Molleker	6	6
8	(Monaco) V Vacherot	7^{7}	6
(Czech Republic) A Paulson	6^{5}	2

Semifinals
4	(Germany) R Molleker	6	7^{7}
8	(Monaco) V Vacherot	4	6^{5}
