= 2020 RPM Open – Singles =

Singles
- 2020 RPM Open

Final
- Champion: (Russia) Aslan Karatsev
- Runner-up: (Netherlands) Tallon Griekspoor
- Score: 6–4, 7–6^{(8–6)}

Events
Singles	Doubles
- RPM Open

The men's singles of the 2020 RPM Open tournament took place on clay in Prague, Czech Republic.

This was the first edition of the tournament.

Aslan Karatsev won the title after defeating Tallon Griekspoor 6–4, 7–6^{(8–6)} in the final.

== Seeds ==
All seeds receive a bye into the second round.

1. (Switzerland) Stan Wawrinka (quarterfinals, withdrew)
2. (France) Pierre-Hugues Herbert (third round)
3. (South Korea) Chung Hyeon (second round)
4. (Germany) Yannick Maden (third round)
5. (Belgium) Kimmer Coppejans (second round)
6. (Slovakia) Martin Kližan (second round)
7. (France) Arthur Rinderknech (quarterfinals)
8. (Latvia) Ernests Gulbis (third round)
9. (Austria) Sebastian Ofner (quarterfinals)
10. (Canada) Steven Diez (second round)
11. (United Kingdom) Jay Clarke (second round)
12. (Ukraine) Sergiy Stakhovsky (third round)
13. (Netherlands) Robin Haase (quarterfinals)
14. (Slovakia) Filip Horanský (second round)
15. (Netherlands) Botic van de Zandschulp (third round)
16. (Kazakhstan) Dmitry Popko (semifinals)

== Draw ==
Key

- Q = Qualifier
- WC = Wild card
- LL = Lucky loser
- Alt = Alternate
- ITF = ITF entry
- PR = Protected ranking
- SR = Special ranking
- SE = Special exempt
- JE = Junior exempt
- JR = Junior Accelerator Programme entrant
- CO = College Accelerator Programme entrant
- NG = Next Gen Accelerator Program entrant
- w/o = Walkover
- r = Retired
- d = Defaulted

=== Finals ===
Quarterfinals
1/WC	(Switzerland) Stan Wawrinka
(Russia) Aslan Karatsev	w/o
16	(Kazakhstan) Dmitry Popko	0	7^{7}	6
7	(France) Arthur Rinderknech	6	6^{1}	3
(Netherlands) Tallon Griekspoor	6	6
13	(Netherlands) Robin Haase	3	2
9	(Austria) Sebastian Ofner	3	7	5
(Czech Republic) Lukáš Rosol	6	5	7

Semifinals
(Russia) Aslan Karatsev	7	4	7
16	(Kazakhstan) Dmitry Popko	5	6	5
(Netherlands) Tallon Griekspoor	6	7
(Czech Republic) Lukáš Rosol	4	5

Final
(Russia) Aslan Karatsev	6	7^{8}
(Netherlands) Tallon Griekspoor	4	6^{6}

=== Top half ===
==== Section 1 ====
First round
Q	(Portugal) G Oliveira	6	6
(Tunisia) M Jaziri	4	4
Q	(Czech Republic) M Gengel	6	7^{7}
(Russia) T Gabashvili	2	6^{1}
(Russia) A Karatsev	3	7	7
(France) E Couacaud	6	5	5
(Sweden) E Ymer	6	7^{7}
(France) M Janvier	3	6^{4}

Second round
1/WC	(Switzerland) S Wawrinka	6	6
Q	(Portugal) G Oliveira	3	4
Q	(Czech Republic) M Gengel	3	2
15	(Netherlands) B van de Zandschulp	6	6
10	(Canada) S Diez	1	2
(Russia) A Karatsev	6	6
(Sweden) E Ymer	2	6	4
8	(Latvia) E Gulbis	6	2	6

Third round
1/WC	(Switzerland) S Wawrinka	6	6
15	(Netherlands) B van de Zandschulp	3	3
(Russia) A Karatsev	6	6
8	(Latvia) E Gulbis	2	1

Quarterfinals
1/WC	(Switzerland) S Wawrinka
(Russia) A Karatsev	w/o

==== Section 2 ====
First round
(Serbia) P Krstin	1	3
WC	(Czech Republic) M Vrbenský	6	6
(France) A Müller	2	3
(Germany) O Otte	6	6
WC	(Czech Republic) J Lehečka	6	3	6^{2}
(Germany) D Masur	4	6	7^{7}
(Russia) R Safiullin	4	6^{4}
(France) H Grenier	6	7^{7}

Second round
4	(Germany) Y Maden	6	2	6
WC	(Czech Republic) M Vrbenský	3	6	4
(Germany) O Otte	5	3
16	(Kazakhstan) D Popko	7	6
11	(United Kingdom) J Clarke	6^{5}	1
(Germany) D Masur	7^{7}	6
(France) H Grenier	4	1
7	(France) A Rinderknech	6	6

Third round
4	(Germany) Y Maden	5	1
16	(Kazakhstan) D Popko	7	6
(Germany) D Masur	3	3
7	(France) A Rinderknech	6	6

Quarterfinals
16	(Kazakhstan) D Popko	0	7^{7}	6
7	(France) A Rinderknech	6	6^{1}	3

=== Bottom half ===
==== Section 3 ====
First round
(Netherlands) T Griekspoor	6	7^{7}
WC	(Slovakia) L Klein	4	6^{5}
(Russia) E Karlovskiy	2	5
(Portugal) F Ferreira Silva	6	7
(Argentina) F Cerúndolo	2	6	0
(Czech Republic) T Macháč	6	4	6
(Czech Republic) Z Kolář	6	6
PR	(Belgium) A De Greef	4	1

Second round
5	(Belgium) K Coppejans	6^{3}	3
(Netherlands) T Griekspoor	7^{7}	6
(Portugal) F Ferreira Silva	6	6^{4}	6^{5}
12	(Ukraine) S Stakhovsky	2	7^{7}	7^{7}
13	(Netherlands) R Haase	6	6
(Czech Republic) T Macháč	3	4
(Czech Republic) Z Kolář	6	6
3	(South Korea) Hy Chung	3	1

Third round
(Netherlands) T Griekspoor	6	6
12	(Ukraine) S Stakhovsky	1	1
13	(Netherlands) R Haase	6	6
(Czech Republic) Z Kolář	3	2

Quarterfinals
(Netherlands) T Griekspoor	6	6
13	(Netherlands) R Haase	3	2

==== Section 4 ====
First round
(Spain) T Robredo	6	4	1
(Argentina) R Olivo	4	6	6
WC	(Czech Republic) J Forejtek	6	6
(Russia) A Vatutin	4	2
(Germany) R Molleker	3	7^{7}	5
(Czech Republic) L Rosol	6	6^{4}	7
(France) E Benchetrit	5	2
(Belgium) R Bemelmans	7	6

Second round
6	(Slovakia) M Kližan	4	5
(Argentina) R Olivo	6	7
WC	(Czech Republic) J Forejtek	6	6^{7}	2
9	(Austria) S Ofner	1	7^{9}	6
14	(Slovakia) F Horanský	6	2	4
(Czech Republic) L Rosol	4	6	6
(Belgium) R Bemelmans	2	2
2	(France) P-H Herbert	6	6

Third round
(Argentina) R Olivo	6	6^{5}	4
9	(Austria) S Ofner	4	7^{7}	6
(Czech Republic) L Rosol	6^{10}	6	6
2	(France) P-H Herbert	7^{12}	3	4

Quarterfinals
9	(Austria) S Ofner	3	7	5
(Czech Republic) L Rosol	6	5	7
