= 2024 Manzanillo Open – Doubles =

Doubles
- 2024 Manzanillo Open

Final
- Champions: (Canada) Liam Draxl (Canada) Cleeve Harper
- Runners-up: (New Zealand) Finn Reynolds (Canada) Benjamin Sigouin
- Score: 6–7^{(4–7)}, 7–5, [12–10]

Events
Singles	Doubles
- Manzanillo Open

This was the first edition of the tournament.

Liam Draxl and Cleeve Harper won the title after defeating Finn Reynolds and Benjamin Sigouin 6–7^{(4–7)}, 7–5, [12–10] in the final.

== Seeds ==
1. (Canada) Liam Draxl / (Canada) Cleeve Harper (champions)
2. (New Zealand) Finn Reynolds / (Canada) Benjamin Sigouin (final)
3. (Israel) Roy Stepanov / (United States) Tennyson Whiting (first round)
4. (United Kingdom) James Davis / (United Kingdom) James MacKinlay (first round)

== Draw ==
Key

- Q = Qualifier
- WC = Wild card
- LL = Lucky loser
- Alt = Alternate
- ITF = ITF entry
- PR = Protected ranking
- SR = Special ranking
- SE = Special exempt
- JE = Junior exempt
- JR = Junior Accelerator Programme entrant
- CO = College Accelerator Programme entrant
- NG = Next Gen Accelerator Program entrant
- w/o = Walkover
- r = Retired
- d = Defaulted

=== Draw ===
First round
1	(Canada) L Draxl (Canada) C Harper	6	6
WC	(Mexico) Rodrigo Alujas (Switzerland) Tanguy Genier	4	4
(Mexico) A Hernández (Mexico) R Pacheco Méndez	6	7^{7}
Alt	(New Zealand) K Pannu (United States) K Smith	4	6^{5}
4	(United Kingdom) James Davis (United Kingdom) J MacKinlay	6^{5}	2
(Austria) N Oberleitner (Germany) M Rosenkranz	7^{7}	6
(United States) Henry Barrett (United States) Felix Corwin	1	2
(Slovenia) B Artnak (United States) Maxwell McKennon	6	6
(United States) Andre Ilagan (Antigua and Barbuda) J Maginley	6^{7}	3
(United States) P Kumar (United States) N Schachter	7^{9}	6
(United Kingdom) G Hussey (United Kingdom) Oliver Okonkwo	7^{13}	4	[10]
3	(Israel) R Stepanov (United States) Tennyson Whiting	6^{11}	6	[7]
(United States) A Perez (United States) Jamie Vance	4	6	[14]
(Mexico) LC Álvarez (United States) Jack Vance	6	4	[16]
Alt	(United Kingdom) Patrick Brady (Venezuela) G Oliveira	6^{5}	7^{9}	[5]
2	(New Zealand) F Reynolds (Canada) B Sigouin	7^{7}	6^{7}	[10]

Quarterfinals
1	(Canada) L Draxl (Canada) C Harper	6	6
(Mexico) A Hernández (Mexico) R Pacheco Méndez	1	4
(Austria) N Oberleitner (Germany) M Rosenkranz	6	3	[8]
(Slovenia) B Artnak (United States) M McKennon	4	6	[10]
(United States) P Kumar (United States) N Schachter	5	3
(United Kingdom) G Hussey (United Kingdom) O Okonkwo	7	6
(Mexico) LC Álvarez (United States) Jac Vance	3	2
2	(New Zealand) F Reynolds (Canada) B Sigouin	6	6

Semifinals
1	(Canada) L Draxl (Canada) C Harper	6	6
(Slovenia) B Artnak (United States) M McKennon	2	4
(United Kingdom) G Hussey (United Kingdom) O Okonkwo	6	6^{4}	[2]
2	(New Zealand) F Reynolds (Canada) B Sigouin	4	7^{7}	[10]

Final
1	(Canada) L Draxl (Canada) C Harper	6^{4}	7	[12]
2	(New Zealand) F Reynolds (Canada) B Sigouin	7^{7}	5	[10]
