= 2026 Košice Open =

- Date: 25 – 31 May
- Edition: 13th
- Surface: Clay
- Location: Košice, Slovakia

Champions

Singles
- (Switzerland) Kilian Feldbausch

Doubles
- (Slovakia) Miloš Karol / (Croatia) Nino Serdarušić
- Košice Open

The 2026 Košice Open was a professional tennis tournament played on clay courts. It was the 13th edition of the tournament which was part of the 2026 ATP Challenger Tour. It took place in Košice, Slovakia between 25 and 31 May 2026.

== Singles main-draw entrants ==
=== Seeds ===
| Country | Player | Rank^{1} | Seed |
|---|---|---|---|
| GBR | Jay Clarke | 199 | 1 |
| BEL | Gilles-Arnaud Bailly | 208 | 2 |
| URU | Franco Roncadelli | 227 | 3 |
| ARG | Guido Iván Justo | 249 | 4 |
| USA | Stefan Dostanic | 266 | 5 |
| CZE | Martin Krumich | 293 | 6 |
| USA | Dali Blanch | 296 | 7 |
| CZE | Hynek Bartoň | 304 | 8 |

- ^{1} Rankings are as of 18 May 2026.

=== Other entrants ===
The following players received wildcards into the singles main draw:

- (Slovakia) Jozef Kovalík
- (Slovakia) Michal Krajčí
- (Slovakia) Lukáš Pokorný

The following player received entry into the singles main draw as an alternate:

- (Slovakia) Andrej Martin

The following players received entry from the qualifying draw:

- (Morocco) Karim Bennani
- (Poland) Tomasz Berkieta
- (Hungary) Péter Fajta
- (Bulgaria) Ivan Ivanov
- (Brazil) Pedro Sakamoto
- (Brazil) Paulo André Saraiva dos Santos

== Champions ==
=== Singles ===
- (Switzerland) Kilian Feldbausch def. (Czech Republic) Martin Krumich 6–0, 4–6, 6–4.

=== Doubles ===
- (Slovakia) Miloš Karol / (Croatia) Nino Serdarušić def. (Slovakia) Lukáš Pokorný / (Czech Republic) David Poljak 5–7, 7–6^{(7–4)}, [10–5].
