= 2022 IBG Prague Open =

- Date: 22–28 August
- Category: ATP Challenger Tour
- Draw: 32S / 16D
- Surface: Clay
- Location: Prague, Czech Republic

Champions

Singles
- (Ukraine) Oleksii Krutykh

Doubles
- (Romania) Victor Vlad Cornea / (Czech Republic) Andrew Paulson
- IBG Prague Open

The 2022 IBG Prague Open was a professional tennis tournament played on clay courts. It was part of the 2022 ATP Challenger Tour. It took place in Prague, Czech Republic between 22 and 28 August 2022.

== Singles main-draw entrants ==
=== Seeds ===
Country	Player	Rank^{1}	Seed
ITA	Matteo Gigante	266	1
UKR	Oleksii Krutykh	270	2
UKR	Vitaliy Sachko	271	3
ESP	Oriol Roca Batalla	272	4
GER	Henri Squire	287	5
TUR	Ergi Kırkın	303	6
TUR	Cem İlkel	304	7
USA	Nicolas Moreno de Alboran	318	8

- ^{1} Rankings as of 15 August 2022.

=== Other entrants ===
The following players received wildcards into the singles main draw:

- (Czech Republic) Jakub Menšík
- (Czech Republic) Petr Nouza
- (Czech Republic) Matěj Vocel

The following player received entry into the singles main draw as an alternate:

- (Czech Republic) Marek Gengel

The following players received entry from the qualifying draw:

- (Romania) Victor Vlad Cornea
- (Uruguay) Martín Cuevas
- (Portugal) João Domingues
- (Czech Republic) Martin Krumich
- (Spain) Adrián Menéndez Maceiras
- (Czech Republic) Michael Vrbenský

== Champions ==
=== Singles ===
- (Ukraine) Oleksii Krutykh def. (Germany) Lucas Gerch 6–3, 6–7^{(2–7)}, 6–2.

=== Doubles ===
- (Romania) Victor Vlad Cornea / (Czech Republic) Andrew Paulson def. (Bulgaria) Adrian Andreev / (Bolivia) Murkel Dellien 6–3, 6–1.
