= 2021 IBG Prague Open – Doubles =

Doubles
- 2021 IBG Prague Open

Final
- Champions: (Romania) Victor Vlad Cornea (Greece) Petros Tsitsipas
- Runners-up: (Czech Republic) Martin Krumich (Czech Republic) Andrew Paulson
- Score: 6–3, 3–6, [10–8]

Events
Singles	Doubles
- IBG Prague Open

Sander Arends and David Pel were the defending champions but chose not to defend their title.

Victor Vlad Cornea and Petros Tsitsipas won the title after defeating Martin Krumich and Andrew Paulson 6–3, 3–6, [10–8] in the final.

== Seeds ==
1. (Philippines) Ruben Gonzales / (South Africa) Ruan Roelofse (first round)
2. (Chinese Taipei) Hsu Yu-hsiou / (Zimbabwe) Benjamin Lock (quarterfinals)
3. (Germany) Fabian Fallert / (United States) Hunter Johnson (quarterfinals)
4. (Romania) Victor Vlad Cornea / (Greece) Petros Tsitsipas (champions)

== Draw ==
Key

- Q = Qualifier
- WC = Wild card
- LL = Lucky loser
- Alt = Alternate
- ITF = ITF entry
- PR = Protected ranking
- SR = Special ranking
- SE = Special exempt
- JE = Junior exempt
- JR = Junior Accelerator Programme entrant
- CO = College Accelerator Programme entrant
- NG = Next Gen Accelerator Program entrant
- w/o = Walkover
- r = Retired
- d = Defaulted

First round
1	(Philippines) R Gonzales (South Africa) R Roelofse	5	1
(Italy) F Agamenone (Argentina) H Casanova	7	6
WC	(Czech Republic) J Forejtek (Czech Republic) M Gengel	7	6
(Dominican Republic) N Hardt (Japan) K Uchida	5	3
3	(Germany) F Fallert (United States) H Johnson	6	2	[10]
(Netherlands) I Sijsling (Netherlands) G Smits	1	6	[4]
(Russia) T Gabashvili (Russia) A Vatutin	1	6^{2}
WC	(Czech Republic) M Krumich (Czech Republic) A Paulson	6	7^{7}
(Spain) O Roca Batalla (Spain) N Sánchez Izquierdo	4	6^{6}
(Belgium) M Geerts (United Kingdom) R Peniston	6	7^{8}
WC	(Czech Republic) Jiří Jeníček (United States) T Kodat	4	5
4	(Romania) VV Cornea (Greece) Pe Tsitsipas	6	7
(Russia) E Karlovskiy (Russia) E Tiurnev	2	2
(France) G Blancaneaux (France) A Cazaux	6	6
(Uruguay) M Cuevas (Argentina) GA Olivieri	3	4
2	(Chinese Taipei) Y-h Hsu (Zimbabwe) B Lock	6	6

Quarterfinals
(Italy) F Agamenone (Argentina) H Casanova	2	6	[10]
WC	(Czech Republic) J Forejtek (Czech Republic) M Gengel	6	3	[6]
3	(Germany) F Fallert (United States) H Johnson	4	6	[4]
WC	(Czech Republic) M Krumich (Czech Republic) A Paulson	6	2	[10]
(Belgium) M Geerts (United Kingdom) R Peniston	3	6	[12]
4	(Romania) VV Cornea (Greece) Pe Tsitsipas	6	3	[14]
(France) G Blancaneaux (France) A Cazaux	7^{7}	6
2	(Chinese Taipei) Y-h Hsu (Zimbabwe) B Lock	6^{5}	2

Semifinals
(Italy) F Agamenone (Argentina) H Casanova	6	6^{2}	[4]
WC	(Czech Republic) M Krumich (Czech Republic) A Paulson	2	7^{7}	[10]
4	(Romania) VV Cornea (Greece) Pe Tsitsipas	w/o
(France) G Blancaneaux (France) A Cazaux

Final
WC	(Czech Republic) M Krumich (Czech Republic) A Paulson	3	6	[8]
4	(Romania) VV Cornea (Greece) Pe Tsitsipas	6	3	[10]
