= 2024 Manzanillo Open =

- Date: 25 November – 1 December
- Edition: 1st
- Location: Manzanillo, Mexico

Champions

Singles
- (Germany) Mats Rosenkranz

Doubles
- (Canada) Liam Draxl / (Canada) Cleeve Harper
- Manzanillo Open

The 2024 Manzanillo Open was a professional tennis tournament played on hardcourts. It was the first edition of the tournament which was part of the 2024 ATP Challenger Tour. It took place in Manzanillo, Mexico between 25 November and 1 December 2024.

== Singles main-draw entrants ==
=== Seeds ===
Country	Player	Rank^{1}	Seed
~~USA~~	~~Nishesh Basavareddy~~	~~152~~	~~1~~
TUN	Aziz Dougaz	218	2
VEN	Gonzalo Oliveira	242	3
BEL	Michael Geerts	295	4
CAN	Liam Draxl	296	5
USA	Aidan Mayo	304	6
~~LUX~~	~~Chris Rodesch~~	~~309~~	~~7~~
USA	Toby Kodat	345	8

- ^{1} Rankings are as of 18 November 2024.

=== Other entrants ===
The following players received wildcards into the singles main draw:

- (Mexico) Luis Carlos Álvarez
- (Mexico) Guillermo Delgadillo
- (Mexico) Alan Magadán

The following players received entry into the singles main draw as alternates:

- (United States) Felix Corwin
- (Mexico) Alex Hernández
- (United States) Strong Kirchheimer

The following players received entry from the qualifying draw:

- (United Kingdom) Patrick Brady
- (United States) Matt Kuhar
- (United States) Maxwell McKennon
- (United States) Karl Poling
- (United States) Noah Schachter
- (United States) Evan Zhu

The following players received entry as lucky losers:

- (Switzerland) Tanguy Genier
- (United States) Alfredo Perez

== Champions ==
=== Singles ===
- (Germany) Mats Rosenkranz def. (Venezuela) Gonzalo Oliveira 6–3, 6–4.

=== Doubles ===
- (Canada) Liam Draxl / (Canada) Cleeve Harper def. (New Zealand) Finn Reynolds / (Canada) Benjamin Sigouin 6–7^{(4–7)}, 7–5, [12–10].
