= 2020 RPM Open – Doubles =

Doubles
- 2020 RPM Open

Final
- Champions: (Netherlands) Sander Arends (Netherlands) David Pel
- Runners-up: (Sweden) André Göransson (Portugal) Gonçalo Oliveira
- Score: 7–5, 7–6^{(7–5)}

Events
| Singles | Doubles |
- RPM Open

The men's doubles of the 2020 RPM Open tournament took place on clay in Prague, Czech Republic.

This was the first edition of the tournament.

Sander Arends and David Pel won the title after defeating André Göransson and Gonçalo Oliveira 7–5, 7–6^{(7–5)} in the final.

== Seeds ==
1. (Argentina) Andrés Molteni / (Monaco) Hugo Nys (first round)
2. (New Zealand) Artem Sitak / (Slovakia) Igor Zelenay (first round)
3. (Sweden) André Göransson / (Portugal) Gonçalo Oliveira (final)
4. (Netherlands) Sander Arends / (Netherlands) David Pel (champions)

== Draw ==
Key

- Q = Qualifier
- WC = Wild card
- LL = Lucky loser
- Alt = Alternate
- ITF = ITF entry
- PR = Protected ranking
- SR = Special ranking
- SE = Special exempt
- JE = Junior exempt
- JR = Junior Accelerator Programme entrant
- CO = College Accelerator Programme entrant
- NG = Next Gen Accelerator Program entrant
- w/o = Walkover
- r = Retired
- d = Defaulted

First round
1 | (Argentina) A Molteni (Monaco) H Nys | 1 | 3
(Belgium) K Coppejans (Spain) S Martos Gornés | 6 | 6
WC | (Czech Republic) J Lehečka (Czech Republic) A Paulson | 4 | 2
(Netherlands) R Haase (Netherlands) B van de Zandschulp | 6 | 6
3 | (Sweden) A Göransson (Portugal) G Oliveira | 7 | 7^{7}
(Germany) Y Maden (Germany) D Masur | 5 | 6^{5}
(Monaco) R Arneodo (Austria) T-S Weissborn | 6 | 3 | [6]
(France) P-H Herbert (France) A Olivetti | 2 | 6 | [10]
(Ukraine) D Molchanov (France) A Rinderknech | 6 | 6
WC | (Czech Republic) J Forejtek (Czech Republic) M Vrbenský | 2 | 2
(Canada) S Diez (Russia) T Gabashvili | 4 | 3
4 | (Netherlands) S Arends (Netherlands) D Pel | 6 | 6
WC | (Czech Republic) P Nouza (Czech Republic) M Vocel | 1 | 5
(India) S Balaji (Czech Republic) L Rosol | 6 | 7
(Mexico) H Hach Verdugo (Spain) D Vega Hernández | 7^{7} | 6
2 | (New Zealand) A Sitak (Slovakia) I Zelenay | 6^{4} | 4

Quarterfinals
(Belgium) K Coppejans (Spain) S Martos Gornés | 2 | 3
(Netherlands) R Haase (Netherlands) B van de Zandschulp | 6 | 6
3 | (Sweden) A Göransson (Portugal) G Oliveira | 5 | 6 | [10]
(France) P-H Herbert (France) A Olivetti | 7 | 2 | [8]
(Ukraine) D Molchanov (France) A Rinderknech | 6^{8} | 6^{3}
4 | (Netherlands) S Arends (Netherlands) D Pel | 7^{10} | 7^{7}
(India) S Balaji (Czech Republic) L Rosol
(Mexico) H Hach Verdugo (Spain) D Vega Hernández | w/o

Semifinals
(Netherlands) R Haase (Netherlands) B van de Zandschulp | 3 | 6 | [5]
3 | (Sweden) A Göransson (Portugal) G Oliveira | 6 | 4 | [10]
4 | (Netherlands) S Arends (Netherlands) D Pel | 6 | 6
(Mexico) H Hach Verdugo (Spain) D Vega Hernández | 1 | 4

Final
3 | (Sweden) A Göransson (Portugal) G Oliveira | 5 | 6^{5}
4 | (Netherlands) S Arends (Netherlands) D Pel | 7 | 7^{7}
