= Manzanillo Open =

- 2024 Manzanillo Open

ATP Challenger Tour
- Location: Manzanillo, Mexico
- Category: ATP Challenger Tour
- Surface: Hard
- Prize money: $41,000

Current champions (2024)
- Singles: (Germany) Mats Rosenkranz
- Doubles: (Canada) Liam Draxl (Canada) Cleeve Harper

The Manzanillo Open is a professional tennis tournament played on hardcourts. It is currently part of the ATP Challenger Tour. It was first held in Manzanillo, Mexico in 2024.

== Past finals ==
=== Singles ===
Year	Champion	Runner-up	Score
2024	(Germany) Mats Rosenkranz	(Venezuela) Gonzalo Oliveira	6–3, 6–4

=== Doubles ===
Year	Champions	Runners-up	Score
2024	(Canada) Liam Draxl (Canada) Cleeve Harper	(New Zealand) Finn Reynolds (Canada) Benjamin Sigouin	6–7^{(4–7)}, 7–5, [12–10]

== See also ==
- 2024 Manzanillo Open

- 2024 Manzanillo Open – Singles
- 2024 Manzanillo Open – Doubles
