= 2024 Manzanillo Open – Singles =

Singles
- 2024 Manzanillo Open

Final
- Champion: (Germany) Mats Rosenkranz
- Runner-up: (Venezuela) Gonzalo Oliveira
- Score: 6–3, 6–4

Events
Singles	Doubles
- Manzanillo Open

This was the first edition of the tournament.

Mats Rosenkranz won the title after defeating Gonzalo Oliveira 6–3, 6–4 in the final.

== Seeds ==
1. (United States) Nishesh Basavareddy (withdrew)
2. (Tunisia) Aziz Dougaz (quarterfinals)
3. (Venezuela) Gonzalo Oliveira (final)
4. (Belgium) Michael Geerts (second round)
5. (Canada) Liam Draxl (semifinals)
6. (United States) Aidan Mayo (semifinals)
7. (Luxembourg) Chris Rodesch (withdrew)
8. (United States) Toby Kodat (quarterfinals)

== Draw ==
Key

- Q = Qualifier
- WC = Wild card
- LL = Lucky loser
- Alt = Alternate
- ITF = ITF entry
- PR = Protected ranking
- SR = Special ranking
- SE = Special exempt
- JE = Junior exempt
- JR = Junior Accelerator Programme entrant
- CO = College Accelerator Programme entrant
- NG = Next Gen Accelerator Program entrant
- w/o = Walkover
- r = Retired
- d = Defaulted

=== Finals ===
Semifinals
(Germany) Mats Rosenkranz	6	7^{7}
5	(Canada) Liam Draxl	3	6^{4}
3	(Venezuela) Gonzalo Oliveira	7^{7}	7
6	(United States) Aidan Mayo	6^{3}	5

Final
(Germany) Mats Rosenkranz	6	6
3	(Venezuela) Gonzalo Oliveira	3	4

=== Top half ===
First round
Q	(United States) E Zhu	1	1
(Mexico) R Pacheco Méndez	6	6
LL	(United States) A Perez	5	2
(Germany) M Rosenkranz	7	6
Q	(United States) N Schachter	1	6^{3}
WC	(Mexico) A Magadán	6	7^{7}	3
Q	(United Kingdom) Patrick Brady	4	3
8	(United States) T Kodat	6	6
4	(Belgium) M Geerts	7^{9}	4	6
Alt	(Mexico) A Hernández	6^{7}	6	3
(Mexico) E Escobedo	6	6
(United Kingdom) G Hussey	2	3
Q	(United States) K Poling	6	6
Q	(United States) Matt Kuhar	3	4
WC	(Mexico) LC Álvarez	6^{6}	7	1
5	(Canada) L Draxl	7^{8}	5	6

Second round
(Mexico) R Pacheco Méndez	7^{7}	4	3
(Germany) M Rosenkranz	6^{5}	6	6
WC	(Mexico) A Magadán	1	7	3
8	(United States) T Kodat	6	5	6
4	(Belgium) M Geerts	6	2	6^{7}
(Mexico) E Escobedo	4	6	7^{9}
Q	(United States) K Poling	3	6^{3}
5	(Canada) L Draxl	6	7^{7}

Quarterfinals
(Germany) M Rosenkranz	6	6
8	(United States) T Kodat	3	3
(Mexico) E Escobedo	6^{5}	4
5	(Canada) L Draxl	7^{7}	6

Semifinals
(Germany) M Rosenkranz	6	7^{7}
5	(Canada) L Draxl	3	6^{4}

=== Bottom half ===
First round
LL	(Switzerland) Tanguy Genier	3	2
(Bulgaria) D Kuzmanov	6	6
(New Zealand) K Pannu	0	7	6^{2}
Alt	(United States) S Kirchheimer	6	5	7^{7}
(United States) Andre Ilagan	5	3
Alt	(United States) Felix Corwin	7	6
(Slovenia) B Artnak	4	1
3	(Venezuela) G Oliveira	6	6
6	(United States) A Mayo	6	6
Q	(United States) Maxwell McKennon	2	2
(Austria) N Oberleitner	6	6
WC	(Mexico) Guillermo Delgadillo	1	2
(Germany) J Engel	6^{2}	6	6
(Argentina) V Aboian	7^{7}	4	3
(United States) K Smith	2	1
2	(Tunisia) A Dougaz	6	6

Second round
(Bulgaria) D Kuzmanov	6	6
Alt	(United States) S Kirchheimer	2	1
Alt	(United States) F Corwin	5	7^{7}	3
3	(Venezuela) G Oliveira	7	6^{4}	6
6	(United States) A Mayo	7	6
(Austria) N Oberleitner	5	4
(Germany) J Engel	0	2
2	(Tunisia) A Dougaz	6	6

Quarterfinals
(Bulgaria) D Kuzmanov	3	1
3	(Venezuela) G Oliveira	6	6
6	(United States) A Mayo	7^{8}	6^{1}	6
2	(Tunisia) A Dougaz	6^{6}	7^{7}	2

Semifinals
3	(Venezuela) G Oliveira	7^{7}	7
6	(United States) A Mayo	6^{3}	5
