= 2023 IBG Prague Open =

- Date: 21–26 August
- Category: ATP Challenger Tour
- Draw: 32S / 16D
- Surface: Clay
- Location: Prague, Czech Republic

Champions

Singles
- (Germany) Rudolf Molleker

Doubles
- (Czech Republic) Petr Nouza / (Czech Republic) Andrew Paulson
- IBG Prague Open

The 2023 IBG Prague Open was a professional tennis tournament played on clay courts. It was part of the 2023 ATP Challenger Tour. It took place in Prague, Czech Republic between 21 and 26 August 2023.

== Singles main-draw entrants ==
=== Seeds ===
Country	Player	Rank^{1}	Seed
AUT	Lukas Neumayer	223	1
ITA	Francesco Maestrelli	246	2
ITA	Luciano Darderi	250	3
GER	Rudolf Molleker	266	4
POR	João Sousa	270	5
GER	Henri Squire	276	6
FRA	Mathias Bourgue	277	7
MON	Valentin Vacherot	286	8

- ^{1} Rankings as of 14 August 2023.

=== Other entrants ===
The following players received wildcards into the singles main draw:

- (Czech Republic) Hynek Bartoň
- (Czech Republic) Jonáš Forejtek
- (United States) Toby Kodat

The following player received entry into the singles main draw using a protected ranking:

- (Spain) Carlos López Montagud

The following players received entry from the qualifying draw:

- (Poland) Paweł Ciaś
- (France) Gabriel Debru
- (Argentina) Federico Agustín Gómez
- Kirill Kivattsev
- (Czech Republic) Jakub Nicod
- (Czech Republic) Michael Vrbenský

== Champions ==
=== Singles ===
- (Germany) Rudolf Molleker def. (France) Gabriel Debru 6–2, 6–2.

=== Doubles ===
- (Czech Republic) Petr Nouza / (Czech Republic) Andrew Paulson def. (Sweden) Filip Bergevi / (Netherlands) Mick Veldheer 7–5, 6–3.
