= 2026 Košice Open – Singles =

Singles
- 2026 Košice Open

Final
- Champion: (Switzerland) Kilian Feldbausch
- Runner-up: (Czech Republic) Martin Krumich
- Score: 6–0, 4–6, 6–4

Events
Singles	Doubles
- Košice Open

Frank Dancevic was the defending champion from when the tournament was last held in 2014, but he was unable to defend his title as he had retired from professional tennis in 2020.

Kilian Feldbausch won the title after defeating Martin Krumich 6–0, 4–6, 6–4 in the final.

== Seeds ==
1. (United Kingdom) Jay Clarke (first round)
2. (Belgium) Gilles-Arnaud Bailly (first round)
3. (Uruguay) Franco Roncadelli (second round)
4. (Argentina) Guido Iván Justo (first round)
5. (United States) Stefan Dostanic (second round, retired)
6. (Czech Republic) Martin Krumich (final)
7. (United States) Dali Blanch (semifinals)
8. (Czech Republic) Hynek Bartoň (quarterfinals)

== Draw ==
Key

- Q = Qualifier
- WC = Wild card
- LL = Lucky loser
- Alt = Alternate
- ITF = ITF entry
- PR = Protected ranking
- SR = Special ranking
- SE = Special exempt
- JE = Junior exempt
- JR = Junior Accelerator Programme entrant
- CO = College Accelerator Programme entrant
- NG = Next Gen Accelerator Program entrant
- w/o = Walkover
- r = Retired
- d = Defaulted

=== Finals ===
Semifinals
6	(Czech Republic) Martin Krumich	6	2	6
(France) Mathys Erhard	3	6	4
7	(United States) Dali Blanch	6^{1}	4
(Switzerland) Kilian Feldbausch	7^{7}	6

Final
6	(Czech Republic) Martin Krumich	0	6	4
(Switzerland) Kilian Feldbausch	6	4	6

=== Top half ===
First round
1	(United Kingdom) J Clarke	6	4	2
(Slovakia) M Karol	4	6	6
Alt	(Slovakia) A Martin	7	6
WC	(Slovakia) J Kovalík	5	2
WC	(Slovakia) L Pokorný	0	6	6
(France) T Paris	6	1	3
(Switzerland) D Stricker	6^{3}	4
6	(Czech Republic) M Krumich	7^{7}	6
4	(Argentina) GI Justo	6	5	6^{3}
(France) Lilian Marmousez	4	7	7^{7}
(Japan) T Daniel	7	6
(North Macedonia) O Prihodko	5	2
(France) Mathys Erhard	6^{5}	6	6
Q	(Bulgaria) I Ivanov	7^{7}	3	3
Q	(Brazil) P Sakamoto	3	2
5	(United States) S Dostanic	6	6

Second round
(Slovakia) M Karol	6	2	6^{3}
Alt	(Slovakia) A Martin	3	6	7^{7}
WC	(Slovakia) L Pokorný	7	2	4
6	(Czech Republic) M Krumich	5	6	6
(France) L Marmousez	3	1
(Japan) T Daniel	6	6
(France) M Erhard	7^{7}	4
5	(United States) S Dostanic	6^{4}	1^{r}

Quarterfinals
Alt	(Slovakia) A Martin	3	4
6	(Czech Republic) M Krumich	6	6
(Japan) T Daniel	6^{5}	5
(France) M Erhard	7^{7}	7

Semifinals
6	(Czech Republic) M Krumich	6	2	6
(France) M Erhard	3	6	4

=== Bottom half ===
First round
7	(United States) Dali Blanch	6	7^{7}
(Italy) CA Caniato	2	6^{5}
Q	(Poland) T Berkieta	5	6^{3}
(Austria) S Kopp	7	7^{7}
Q	(Hungary) Péter Fajta	6	7
Q	(Brazil) PA Saraiva dos Santos	3	5
(Poland) M Kaśnikowski	7^{7}	2	3
3	(Uruguay) F Roncadelli	6^{5}	6	6
8	(Czech Republic) H Bartoň	6	6
(Jordan) A Shelbayh	4	1
WC	(Slovakia) Michal Krajčí	2	4
(Slovakia) N Gombos	6	6
Q	(Morocco) K Bennani	1	4
(Italy) F Bondioli	6	6
(Switzerland) K Feldbausch	6	6
2	(Belgium) GA Bailly	2	2

Second round
7	(United States) Dal Blanch	6	6
(Austria) S Kopp	3	2
Q	(Hungary) P Fajta	7	6
3	(Uruguay) F Roncadelli	5	2
8	(Czech Republic) H Bartoň	6	6
(Slovakia) N Gombos	3	2
(Italy) F Bondioli	7^{7}	2	1
(Switzerland) K Feldbausch	6^{3}	6	6

Quarterfinals
7	(United States) Dal Blanch	6	6
Q	(Hungary) P Fajta	2	3
8	(Czech Republic) H Bartoň	6	4	2
(Switzerland) K Feldbausch	3	6	6

Semifinals
7	(United States) Dal Blanch	6^{1}	4
(Switzerland) K Feldbausch	7^{7}	6
