= 2023 IBG Prague Open – Doubles =

Doubles
- 2023 IBG Prague Open

Final
- Champions: (Czech Republic) Petr Nouza (Czech Republic) Andrew Paulson
- Runners-up: (Sweden) Filip Bergevi (Netherlands) Mick Veldheer
- Score: 7–5, 6–3

Events
Singles	Doubles
- IBG Prague Open

Victor Vlad Cornea and Andrew Paulson were the defending champions but only Paulson chose to defend his title, partnering Petr Nouza. Paulson successfully defended his title after defeating Filip Bergevi and Mick Veldheer 7–5, 6–3 in the final.

== Seeds ==
1. (Czech Republic) Petr Nouza / (Czech Republic) Andrew Paulson (champions)
2. (Sweden) Filip Bergevi / (Netherlands) Mick Veldheer (final)
3. (Argentina) Federico Agustín Gómez / (United Kingdom) Marcus Willis (semifinals)
4. (India) Niki Kaliyanda Poonacha / (Australia) Adam Taylor (first round)

== Draw ==
Key

- Q = Qualifier
- WC = Wild card
- LL = Lucky loser
- Alt = Alternate
- ITF = ITF entry
- PR = Protected ranking
- SR = Special ranking
- SE = Special exempt
- JE = Junior exempt
- JR = Junior Accelerator Programme entrant
- CO = College Accelerator Programme entrant
- NG = Next Gen Accelerator Program entrant
- w/o = Walkover
- r = Retired
- d = Defaulted

First round
1	(Czech Republic) P Nouza (Czech Republic) A Paulson	6	6
(Czech Republic) M Gengel (Czech Republic) L Rosol	3	2
(France) M Bourgue (France) V Royer	1	6	[3]
(Czech Republic) Jiří Barnat (Slovakia) M Karol	6	2	[10]
4	(India) N Kaliyanda Poonacha (Australia) A Taylor	3	4
Alt	(Poland) S Kielan; Kirill Kivattsev	6	6
(Israel) D Cukierman (Israel) R Stepanov	6^{5}	3
(Germany) R Molleker (Germany) H Squire	7^{7}	6
(New Zealand) F Reynolds (New Zealand) A Sitak	6^{8}	7^{7}	[3]
(Croatia) Z Babić (Bulgaria) A Donski	7^{10}	6^{2}	[10]
WC	(Czech Republic) H Bartoň (Czech Republic) D Siniakov	3	6^{5}
3	(Argentina) FA Gómez (United Kingdom) M Willis	6	7^{7}
(France) C Hemery (France) M Janvier	3	6	[7]
WC	(Czech Republic) J Forejtek (Czech Republic) M Vrbenský	6	3	[10]
(Portugal) Fábio Coelho (Portugal) J Faria	4	1
2	(Sweden) F Bergevi (Netherlands) M Veldheer	6	6

Quarterfinals
1	(Czech Republic) P Nouza (Czech Republic) A Paulson	6	6
(Czech Republic) J Barnat (Slovakia) M Karol	3	2
Alt	(Poland) S Kielan; K Kivattsev	4	6	[9]
(Germany) R Molleker (Germany) H Squire	6	3	[11]
(Croatia) Z Babić (Bulgaria) A Donski	3	7	[12]
3	(Argentina) FA Gómez (United Kingdom) M Willis	6	5	[14]
WC	(Czech Republic) J Forejtek (Czech Republic) M Vrbenský	5	1
2	(Sweden) F Bergevi (Netherlands) M Veldheer	7	6

Semifinals
1	(Czech Republic) P Nouza (Czech Republic) A Paulson	6	6^{5}	[10]
(Germany) R Molleker (Germany) H Squire	3	7^{7}	[2]
3	(Argentina) FA Gómez (United Kingdom) M Willis	2	4
2	(Sweden) F Bergevi (Netherlands) M Veldheer	6	6

Final
1	(Czech Republic) P Nouza (Czech Republic) A Paulson	7	6
2	(Sweden) F Bergevi (Netherlands) M Veldheer	5	3
