= 2026 Košice Open – Doubles =

Doubles
- 2026 Košice Open

Final
- Champions: (Slovakia) Miloš Karol (Croatia) Nino Serdarušić
- Runners-up: (Slovakia) Lukáš Pokorný (Czech Republic) David Poljak
- Score: 5–7, 7–6^{(7–4)}, [10–5]

Events
Singles	Doubles
- Košice Open

Facundo Argüello and Ariel Behar were the defending champions from when the tournament was last held in 2014 but did not defend their title as Argüello had retired from professional tennis and Behar chose not to defend his title.

Miloš Karol and Nino Serdarušić won the title after defeating Lukáš Pokorný and David Poljak 5–7, 7–6^{(7–4)}, [10–5] in the final.

== Seeds ==
1. (Slovakia) Miloš Karol / (Croatia) Nino Serdarušić (champions)
2. (Slovakia) Lukáš Pokorný / (Czech Republic) David Poljak (final)
3. (Brazil) Luís Britto / (Brazil) Paulo André Saraiva dos Santos (quarterfinals)
4. (United Kingdom) Finn Bass / (United Kingdom) Jay Clarke (first round)

== Draw ==
Key

- Q = Qualifier
- WC = Wild card
- LL = Lucky loser
- Alt = Alternate
- ITF = ITF entry
- PR = Protected ranking
- SR = Special ranking
- SE = Special exempt
- JE = Junior exempt
- JR = Junior Accelerator Programme entrant
- CO = College Accelerator Programme entrant
- NG = Next Gen Accelerator Program entrant
- w/o = Walkover
- r = Retired
- d = Defaulted

First round
1	(Slovakia) M Karol (Croatia) N Serdarušić	6	4	[12]
(Morocco) K Bennani (Spain) Imanol López Morillo	3	6	[10]
(Spain) Ignasi Forcano (Spain) Rafael Izquierdo Luque	6	6
WC	(Slovakia) Michal Krajčí (Slovakia) Radovan Michalik	2	2
4	(United Kingdom) F Bass (United Kingdom) J Clarke	7	4	[5]
(Tunisia) S Mansouri (Austria) M Neuchrist	5	6	[10]
(Italy) Simone Agostini (Sweden) Oliver Johansson	6	2	[6]
(Italy) F Bondioli (Italy) CA Caniato	4	6	[10]
WC	(Slovakia) Marko Bekéni (Slovakia) Dominik Mačej	2	2
(Hungary) Péter Fajta (Hungary) Péter Makk	6	6
(Ukraine) Aleksandr Braynin (Ukraine) G Kravchenko	6^{6}	4
3	(Brazil) L Britto (Brazil) PA Saraiva dos Santos	7^{8}	6
(North Macedonia) O Prihodko (Brazil) P Sakamoto	6	7
(Poland) T Berkieta (Tunisia) Adam Nagoudi	3	5
(United States) A Ayeni (Australia) Ethan Cook	7^{7}	4	[4]
2	(Slovakia) L Pokorný (Czech Republic) D Poljak	6^{1}	6	[10]

Quarterfinals
1	(Slovakia) M Karol (Croatia) N Serdarušić	6	6
(Spain) I Forcano (Spain) R Izquierdo Luque	1	2
(Tunisia) S Mansouri (Austria) M Neuchrist	7	6
(Italy) F Bondioli (Italy) CA Caniato	5	4
(Hungary) P Fajta (Hungary) P Makk	7	6^{6}	[10]
3	(Brazil) L Britto (Brazil) PA Saraiva dos Santos	5	7^{8}	[4]
(North Macedonia) O Prihodko (Brazil) P Sakamoto	4	1
2	(Slovakia) L Pokorný (Czech Republic) D Poljak	6	6

Semifinals
1	(Slovakia) M Karol (Croatia) N Serdarušić	6	7^{7}
(Tunisia) S Mansouri (Austria) M Neuchrist	3	6^{4}
(Hungary) P Fajta (Hungary) P Makk	3	6	[6]
2	(Slovakia) L Pokorný (Czech Republic) D Poljak	6	3	[10]

Final
1	(Slovakia) M Karol (Croatia) N Serdarušić	5	7^{7}	[10]
2	(Slovakia) L Pokorný (Czech Republic) D Poljak	7	6^{4}	[5]
