= 2021 IBG Prague Open =

- Date: 23–29 August
- Category: ATP Challenger Tour
- Draw: 32S / 16D
- Surface: Clay
- Location: Prague, Czech Republic

Champions

Singles
- (Italy) Franco Agamenone

Doubles
- (Romania) Victor Vlad Cornea / (Greece) Petros Tsitsipas
- IBG Prague Open

The 2021 IBG Prague Open was a professional tennis tournament played on clay courts. It was part of the 2021 ATP Challenger Tour. It took place in Prague, Czech Republic, between 23 and 29 August 2021.

== Singles main-draw entrants ==
=== Seeds ===
Country	Player	Rank^{1}	Seed
RUS	Evgeny Karlovskiy	290	1
USA	Alexander Ritschard	300	2
RUS	Evgenii Tiurnev	310	3
FRA	Geoffrey Blancaneaux	311	4
CZE	Jonáš Forejtek	315	5
BEL	Michael Geerts	319	6
ROU	Filip Jianu	320	7
SRB	Miljan Zekić	324	8

- ^{1} Rankings as of 16 August 2021.

=== Other entrants ===
The following players received wildcards into the singles main draw:

- (Czech Republic) Martin Krumich
- (Czech Republic) Andrew Paulson
- (Czech Republic) Daniel Siniakov

The following player received entry into the singles main draw using a protected ranking:

- (Italy) Matteo Donati

The following players received entry from the qualifying draw:

- (Argentina) Facundo Díaz Acosta
- (Belarus) Uladzimir Ignatik
- (Hungary) Zsombor Piros
- (United States) Alex Rybakov

== Champions ==
=== Singles ===
- (Italy) Franco Agamenone def. (United Kingdom) Ryan Peniston 6–3, 6–1.

=== Doubles ===
- (Romania) Victor Vlad Cornea / (Greece) Petros Tsitsipas def. (Czech Republic) Martin Krumich / (Czech Republic) Andrew Paulson 6–3, 3–6, [10–8].
