= 2020 RPM Open =

- Date: 24–30 August 2020
- Edition: 1st
- Category: ATP Challenger Tour
- Prize money: $137,560
- Surface: Clay
- Location: Prague, Czech Republic
- Venue: TJ Spoje

Champions

Singles
- (Russia) Aslan Karatsev

Doubles
- (Netherlands) Sander Arends / (Netherlands) David Pel
- RPM Open

The 2020 RPM Open was a professional tennis tournament played on outdoor clay courts. It was part of the 2020 ATP Challenger Tour. It took place at the TJ Spoje in the Žižkov neighbourhood of Prague, Czech Republic.

== Singles main-draw entrants ==
=== Seeds ===
Country	Player	Rank^{1}	Seed
SUI	Stan Wawrinka	17	1
FRA	Pierre-Hugues Herbert	71	2
KOR	Chung Hyeon	142	3
GER	Yannick Maden	149	4
BEL	Kimmer Coppejans	154	5
SVK	Martin Kližan	159	6
FRA	Arthur Rinderknech	161	7
LAT	Ernests Gulbis	162	8
AUT	Sebastian Ofner	163	9
CAN	Steven Diez	165	10
GBR	Jay Clarke	167	11
UKR	Sergiy Stakhovsky	169	12
NED	Robin Haase	170	13
SVK	Filip Horanský	171	14
NED	Botic van de Zandschulp	173	15
KAZ	Dmitry Popko	176	16

- ^{1} Rankings are as of 16 March 2020.

=== Other entrants ===
The following players received wildcards into the singles main draw:

- (Czech Republic) Jonáš Forejtek
- (Slovakia) Lukáš Klein
- (Czech Republic) Jiří Lehečka
- (Czech Republic) Michael Vrbenský
- (Switzerland) Stan Wawrinka

The following player received entry into the singles main draw using a protected ranking:

- (Belgium) Arthur De Greef

The following players received entry from the qualifying draw:

- (Czech Republic) Marek Gengel
- (Portugal) Gonçalo Oliveira

== Champions ==
=== Singles ===
- (Russia) Aslan Karatsev def. (Netherlands) Tallon Griekspoor 6–4, 7–6^{(8–6)}.

=== Doubles ===
- (Netherlands) Sander Arends / (Netherlands) David Pel def. (Sweden) André Göransson / (Portugal) Gonçalo Oliveira 7–5, 7–6^{(7–5)}.
