= Benjamin Sigouin =

Canadian tennis player (born 1999)

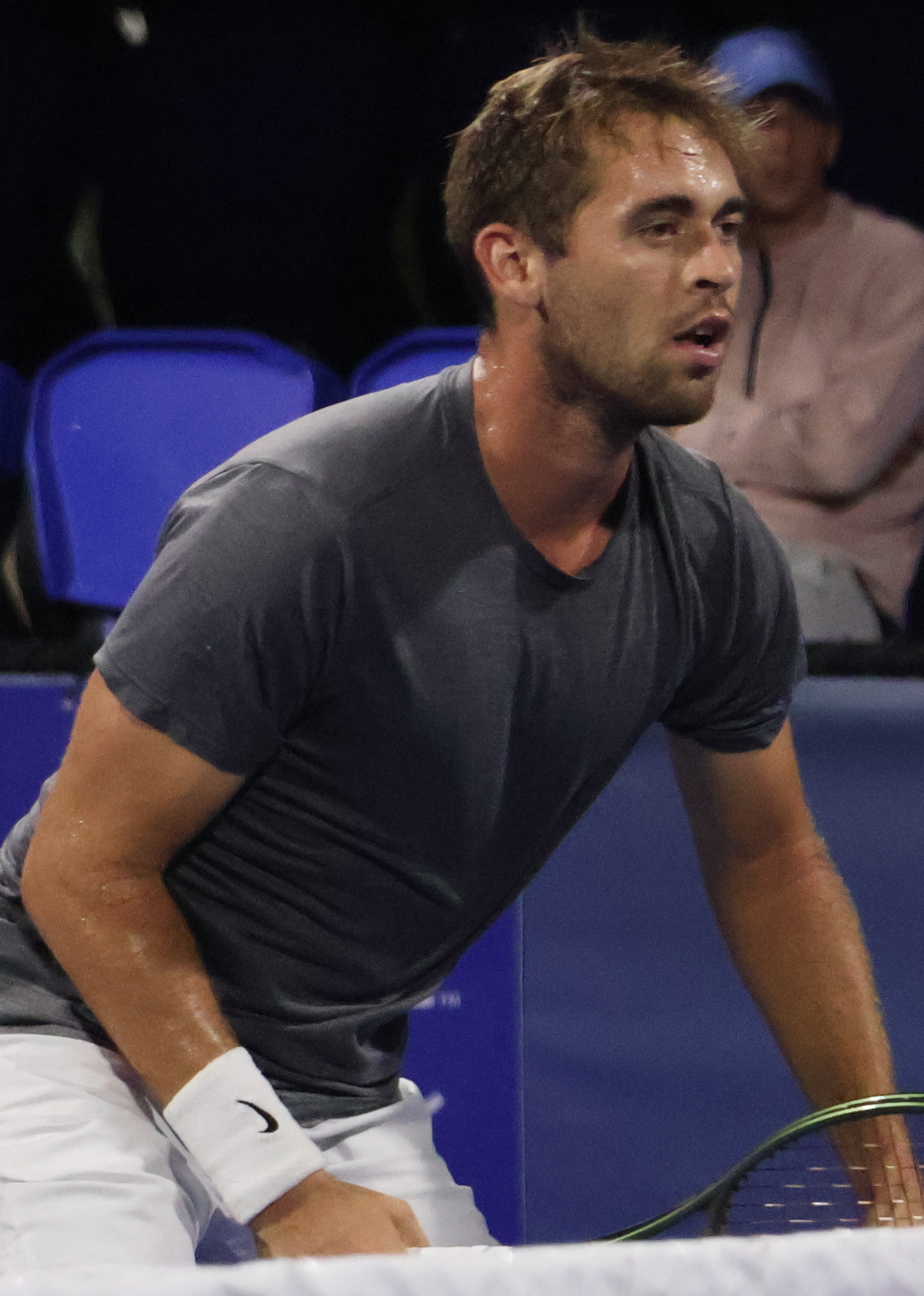
- Sigouin at the 2023 Cary Challenger II
- Country (sports): Canada
- Born: 3 June 1999 (age 27) Vancouver, British Columbia, Canada
- Height: 1.91 m (6 ft 3 in)
- Plays: Right-handed (two-handed backhand)
- College: University of North Carolina
- Prize money: US $92,968

Singles
- Highest ranking: No. 523 (15 July 2019)

Doubles
- Career record: 0–2
- Career titles: 2 Challengers
- Highest ranking: No. 198 (6 January 2025)

Benjamin Sigouin (born 3 June 1999) is a Canadian tennis player who specializes in doubles. He has a career high ATP career high doubles ranking of world No. 198 achieved on 6 January 2025 and a singles ranking of No. 523 achieved on 15 July 2019.

Sigouin has won 2 ATP Challengers and 4 ITF Men's World Tennis Tour doubles titles.

== Career ==
Sigouin made his ATP tour main draw debut at the 2023 National Bank Open, where he was granted a wildcard entry into the men's doubles draw alongside compatriot Kelsey Stevenson. The pair lost in the first round to Frenchman Nicolas Mahut and another Canadian Vasek Pospisil 5–7, 4–6.

== Juniors ==
Sigouin had a fantastic junior career, reaching a career high combined junior ranking of number 4 in the world. He reached the boys' doubles final at the 2016 US Open alongside fellow Canadian Félix Auger-Aliassime before losing to Juan Carlos Aguilar and Felipe Meligeni Alves 3–6, 6–7^{(4–7)}.

In October 2015, Sigouin and fellow Canadians Félix Auger-Aliassime and Denis Shapovalov captured the first Junior Davis Cup title for Canada in its history.

== ATP Challenger and ITF Tour finals ==
=== Doubles: 15 (8–7) ===
Legend ATP Challengers (2–1) ITF Futures/World Tennis Tour (6–6)	Titles by surface Hard (6–7) Clay (2–0) Grass (0–0)

Result	W–L	Date	Tournament	Tier	Surface	Partner	Opponents	Score
Loss	0–1	Sep 2016	Canada F8, Toronto	Futures	Hard	(Canada) Juan Carlos Aguilar	(Mexico) Hans Hach (United States) Rhyne Williams	3–6, 3–6
Win	1–1	Jun 2018	Canada F3, Calgary	Futures	Hard	(Canada) Alexis Galarneau	(United States) Alexios Halebian (Canada) Samuel Monette	7–5, 7–6^{(7–4)}
Loss	1–2	Jul 2018	Canada F5, Saskatoon	Futures	Hard	(Canada) Alexis Galarneau	(Switzerland) Marc-Andrea Huesler (Netherlands) Sem Verbeek	3–6, 3–6
Loss	1–3	Jun 2021	M25 Wichita, USA	World Tennis Tour	Hard	(United States) John McNally	(Chile) Nicoas Acevedo Olmos (Bolivia) Murkel Dellien	4–6, 6–2, [10–12]
Loss	1–4	Jul 2022	M15 Waco, USA	World Tennis Tour	Hard	(United States) Mac Kiger	(United States) George Goldhoff (United States) Tyler Zink	6–4, 5–7, [7–10]
Win	2–4	Oct 2022	M15 Ithaca, USA	World Tennis Tour	Hard	(United States) John McNally	(United States) Nico Mostardi (Germany) Jannik Opitz	6–4, 7–6^{(7–5)}
Loss	2–5	Jan 2023	M15 Ithaca, USA	World Tennis Tour	Hard	(United States) Mac Kiger	(United States) Nick Chappell (United States) Nathan Ponwith	2–6, 4–6
Win	3–5	Jan 2023	M15 Edmond, USA	World Tennis Tour	Hard	(United States) Mac Kiger	(United States) Collin Altamirano (Romania) Gabi Adrian Boitan	7–6^{(9–7)}, 6–4
Win	4–5	May 2023	M25 Pensacola, USA	World Tennis Tour	Clay	(United States) Vasil Kirkov	(United States) Sekou Bangoura (Israel) Roy Stepanov	6–4, 4–6, [10–8]
Loss	4–6	Jun 2023	M25 Tulsa, USA	World Tennis Tour	Hard	(United States) Mac Kiger	(United States) Ozan Baris (United States) Garrett Johns	2–6, 5–7
Win	5–6	Feb 2024	M25 Naples, USA	World Tennis Tour	Clay	(United States) Mac Kiger	(United States) Hunter Heck (Japan) Kenta Miyoshi	6–2, 6–7^{(7–9)}, [10–6]
Win	6–6	Mar 2024	M25 Calabasas, USA	World Tennis Tour	Hard	(New Zealand) Finn Reynolds	(United States) Kyle Kang (United States) Neel Rajesh	6–4, 2–6, [13–11]
Win	7–6	Jun 2024	Little Rock, United States	Challenger	Hard	(Canada) Liam Draxl	(India) Rithvik Choudary Bollipalli (Mexico) Hans Hach Verdugo	6–4, 3–6, [10–7]
Win	8–6	Nov 2024	Puerto Vallarta, Mexico	Challenger	Hard	(Canada) Liam Draxl	(United States) Karl Poling (United States) Ryan Seggerman	7–6^{(7–5)}, 6–2
Loss	8–7	Dec 2024	Manzanillo, Mexico	Challenger	Hard	(New Zealand) Finn Reynolds	(Canada) Liam Draxl (Canada) Cleeve Harper	7–6^{(7–4)}, 5–7, [10–12]

== Junior Grand Slam finals ==
=== Doubles: 1 (1 runner-up) ===
Result	Year	Tournament	Surface	Partner	Opponents	Score
Loss	2016	US Open	Hard	(Canada) Félix Auger-Aliassime	(Bolivia) Juan Carlos Aguilar (Brazil) Felipe Meligeni Alves	3–6, 6–7^{(4–7)}

=== Junior Davis Cup ===
==== Titles: 1 (1 win, 0 runner-ups) ====
Edition	Team	Rd	Score
2015	Félix Auger-Aliassime; Denis Shapovalov; Benjamin Sigouin		
2015	Félix Auger-Aliassime; Denis Shapovalov; Benjamin Sigouin	RR	Canada 3–0 Czech Republic
2015	Félix Auger-Aliassime; Denis Shapovalov; Benjamin Sigouin	RR	Canada 3–0 Hong Kong
2015	Félix Auger-Aliassime; Denis Shapovalov; Benjamin Sigouin	RR	Canada 3–0 Poland
2015	Félix Auger-Aliassime; Denis Shapovalov; Benjamin Sigouin	SF	Canada 3–0 Russia
2015	Félix Auger-Aliassime; Denis Shapovalov; Benjamin Sigouin	F	Canada 2–1 Germany

==== Participation: 2 (2 wins, 0 losses) ====
Group	Rd	Date	Opponent nation	Score	Venue	Surface	Match	Opponent player(s)	W–L	Rubber score
Final	RR	Oct 2015	Czech Republic	3–0	Madrid	Clay	Doubles (w/ D Shapovalov)	Patrik Rikl; Michael Vrbenský	Win	7–6^{(7–2)}, 3–6, 6–2
Final	RR	Oct 2015	Poland	3–0	Madrid	Clay	Doubles (w/ D. Shapovalov)	Konrad Fryze; Daniel Michalski	Win	6–1, 6–1)
