= Mats Rosenkranz =

German tennis player (born 1998)

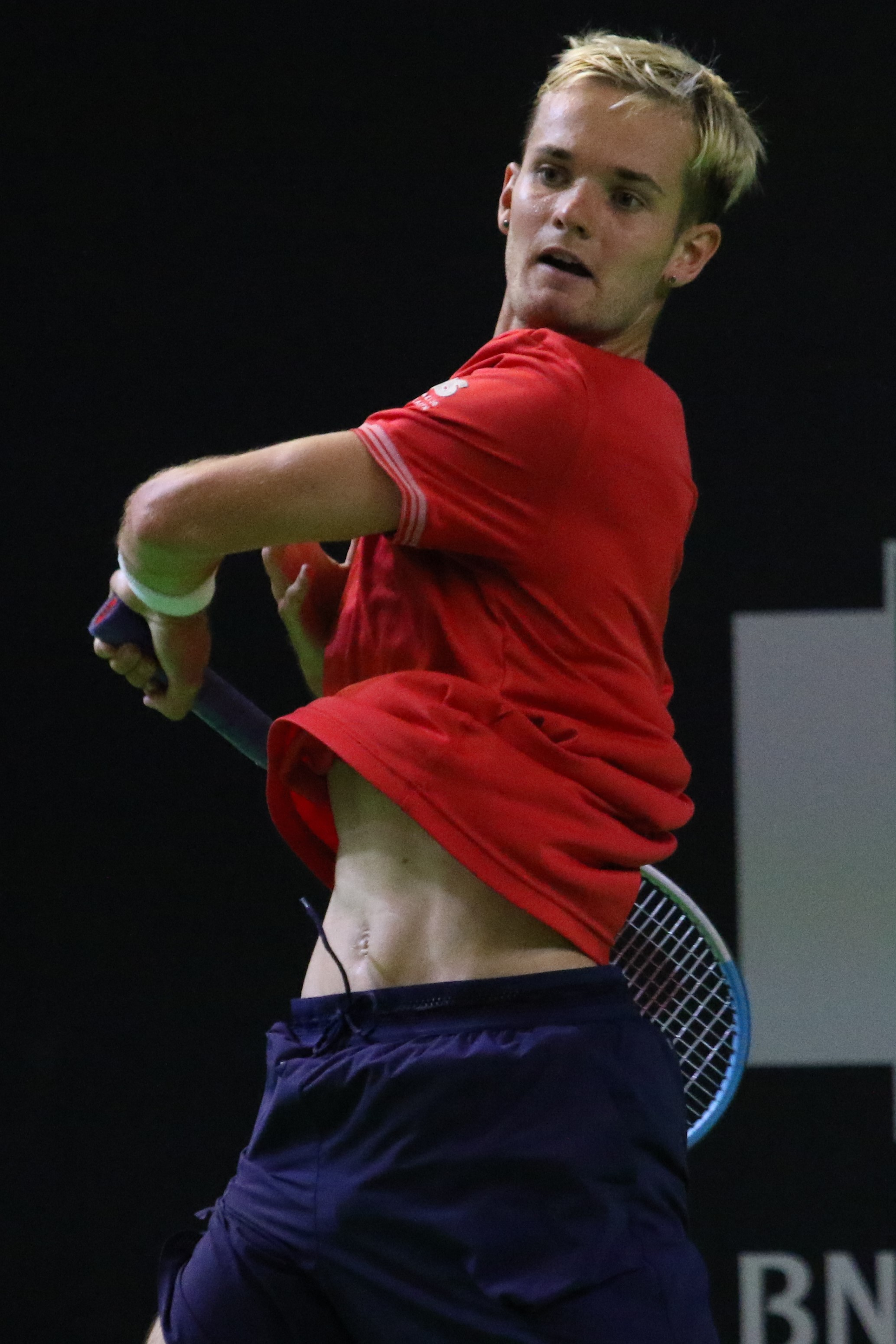
- Rosenkranz in 2021
- Country (sports): Germany
- Born: 23 August 1998 (age 27) Essen, Germany
- Height: 1.93 m (6 ft 4 in)
- Plays: Left-handed (two-handed backhand)
- Coach: Peter Moraing
- Prize money: $200,542

Singles
- Career record: 0–0
- Career titles: 0
- Highest ranking: No. 254 (17 November 2025)
- Current ranking: No. 254 (17 November 2025)

Doubles
- Career record: 0–0
- Career titles: 0
- Highest ranking: No. 389 (20 October 2025)
- Current ranking: No. 403 (17 November 2025)
- Last updated on: 17 November 2025.

Mats Rosenkranz (born 23 August 1998) is a German tennis player. He has a career high ATP singles ranking of world No. 254 achieved on 17 November 2025 and a career high doubles ranking of No. 389 achieved on 20 October 2025.

== Career ==
=== 2022–2024: First Challenger title and top-25 win ===
In January 2022, Rosenkranz won his first ATP Challenger doubles title, defeating Matías Franco Descotte and Facundo Díaz Acosta at the 2022 Challenger de Tigre, partnering with Conner Huertas del Pino.

In the first-round qualifying match for the 2022 Mallorca Open, Rosenkranz scored his biggest win against world No. 25 Nikoloz Basilashvili in straight sets. He lost in the second qualifying round to Antoine Bellier.

He won his first ATP Challenger singles title at the 2024 Manzanillo Open defeating Venezuelan Gonzalo Oliveira.

== ATP Challenger Tour finals ==
=== Singles: 1 (1 title) ===
Finals by surface
Hard (1–0)
Clay (0–0)

Result	W–L	Date	Tournament	Surface	Opponent	Score
Win	1–0	Dec 2024	Manzanillo Open, Mexico	Hard	(Venezuela) Gonzalo Oliveira	6–3, 6–4

=== Doubles: 3 (3 titles) ===
Finals by surface
Hard (2–0)
Clay (1–0)

Result	W–L	Date	Tournament	Surface	Partner	Opponents	Score
Win	1–0	Jan 2022	Challenger de Tigre, Argentina	Clay	(Peru) Conner Huertas del Pino	(Argentina) Matías Franco Descotte (Argentina) Facundo Díaz Acosta	5–6 ret.
Win	2–0	Aug 2025	Crete Challenger, Greece	Hard	(United Kingdom) Harry Wendelken	(Romania) Victor Vlad Cornea (Finland) Patrik Niklas-Salminen	4–6, 6–4, [10–7]
Win	3–0	Oct 2025	Fairfield Challenger, United States	Hard	(Germany) Max Wiskandt	(United States) Spencer Johnson (United States) Wally Thayne	3–6, 7–5, [10–6]

== ITF Tour finals ==
=== Singles: 10 (8 titles, 2 runner-ups) ===
Finals by surface
Hard (4–2)
Clay (1–0)
Grass (1–0)
Carpet (2–0)

Result	W–L	Date	Tournament	Surface	Opponent	Score
Win	1–0	Aug 2019	M15 Wetzlar, Germany	Clay	(Brazil) Bruno Santanna	6–4, 6–3
Loss	1–1	Feb 2021	M15 Nur-Sultan, Kazakhstan	Hard	(Finland) Otto Virtanen	5–7, 3–6
Win	2–1	Jun 2021	M15 Gaiba, Italy	Grass	(Zimbabwe) Benjamin Lock	7–6^{(13–11)}, 7–6^{(7–5)}
Win	3–1	Oct 2022	M25 Sarreguemines, France	Carpet (i)	(France) Dan Added	6–3, 3–6, 6–3
Win	4–1	Sep 2023	M25 Plaisir, France	Hard	(France) Antoine Hoang	6–3, 6–7^{(3–7)}, 7–6^{(7–3)}
Loss	4–2	Sep 2023	M15 Danderyd, Sweden	Hard (i)	(United Kingdom) Giles Hussey	2–6, 3–6
Win	5–2	Mar 2024	M25 Trimbach, Switzerland	Carpet (i)	(France) Antoine Hoang	6–1, 6–4
Win	6–2	Oct 2024	M15 Offenbach, Germany	Hard (i)	(Czech Republic) Matthew William Donald	6–3, 7–5
Win	7–2	Feb 2025	M15 Oberhaching, Germany	Hard (i)	(Germany) Marvin Möller	6–1, 6–2
Win	8–2	Sep 2025	M25 Plaisir, France	Hard (i)	(United Kingdom) Hamish Stewart	6–3, 6–3

=== Doubles: 16 (8 titles, 8 runner-ups) ===
Finals by surface
Hard (2–3)
Clay (4–2)
Carpet (2–3)

Result	W–L	Date	Tournament	Surface	Partner	Opponents	Score
Win	1–0	May 2018	Turkey F20, Antalya	Clay	(Germany) Valentin Günther	(France) Florent Diep (France) Francois-Arthur Vibert	6–1, 6–2
Loss	1–1	Sep 2018	Belgium F10, Damme	Clay	(Germany) Valentin Günther	(France) Corentin Denolly (France) Francois-Arthur Vibert	4–6, 6–2, [9–11]
Win	2–1	Oct 2018	Germany F15, Bad Salzdetfurth	Carpet	(Czech Republic) Petr Nouza	(Turkey) Altug Celikbilek (France) Hugo Voljacques	4–6, 6–3, [14–12]
Loss	2–2	Feb 2019	M15 Kaarst, Germany	Carpet	(United Kingdom) Mark Whitehouse	(Netherlands) Igor Sijsling (Netherlands) Botic van de Zandschulp	4–6, 4–6
Win	3–2	Jul 2019	M15 Saarlouis, Germany	Clay	(Australia) James Frawley	(Luxembourg) Tom Diederich (Germany) Lasse Muscheites	6–4, 6–2
Loss	3–3	Jul 2019	M15 Marburg, Germany	Clay	(Australia) James Frawley	(Romania) Vasile Antonescu (Romania) Patrick Grigoriu	6–7^{(6–8)}, 6–4, [6–10]
Win	4–3	Jul 2019	M25 Kassel, Germany	Clay	(Australia) James Frawley	(France) Sadio Doumbia (France) Fabien Reboul	7–5, 7–6^{(12–10)}
Win	5–3	Aug 2019	M15 Wetzlar, Germany	Clay	(Australia) James Frawley	(Germany) Constantin Schmitz (Germany) Niklas Schell	2–6, 6–3, [12–10]
Win	6–3	Feb 2020	M15 Veigy-Foncenex, France	Carpet	(Germany) Fabian Fallert	(Netherlands) Ryan Nijboer (Netherlands) Glenn Smits	6–4, 6–3
Loss	6–4	Sep 2020	M15 Monastir, Tunisia	Hard	(Germany) Tom Schönenberg	(Tunisia) Aziz Dougaz (Tunisia) Skander Mansouri	6–4, 6–7^{(1–7)}, [5–10]
Loss	6–5	Dec 2020	M15 Monastir, Tunisia	Hard	(Tunisia) Skander Mansouri	(Austria) Alexander Erler (Austria) David Pichler	2–6, 6–7^{(12–14)}
Win	7–5	Nov 2022	M25 Sharm El Sheikh, Egypt	Hard	(Czech Republic) Marek Gengel	(Belarus) Alexander Zgirovsky (South Africa) Kris van Wyk	6–2, 7–5
Win	8–5	Sep 2023	M15 Danderyd, Sweden	Hard (i)	(Germany) Adrian Oetzbach	(Netherlands) Daniel de Jonge (Germany) Jakob Schnaitter	6–0, 6–3
Loss	8–6	Mar 2024	M25 Trimbach, Switzerland	Carpet (i)	(Germany) Tom Schönenberg	(Germany) Niklas Schell (United Kingdom) Mark Whitehouse	4–6, 4–6
Loss	8–7	Sep 2024	M25 Plaisir, France	Hard (i)	Marat Sharipov	(United Kingdom) Tom Hands (United Kingdom) Harry Wendelken	3–6, 4–6
Loss	8–8	Mar 2025	M25 Trimbach, Switzerland	Carpet (i)	(Germany) Niklas Schell	(United Kingdom) Ben Jones (Czech Republic) David Poljak	5–7, 4–6
