= Franco Agamenone =

Italian tennis player

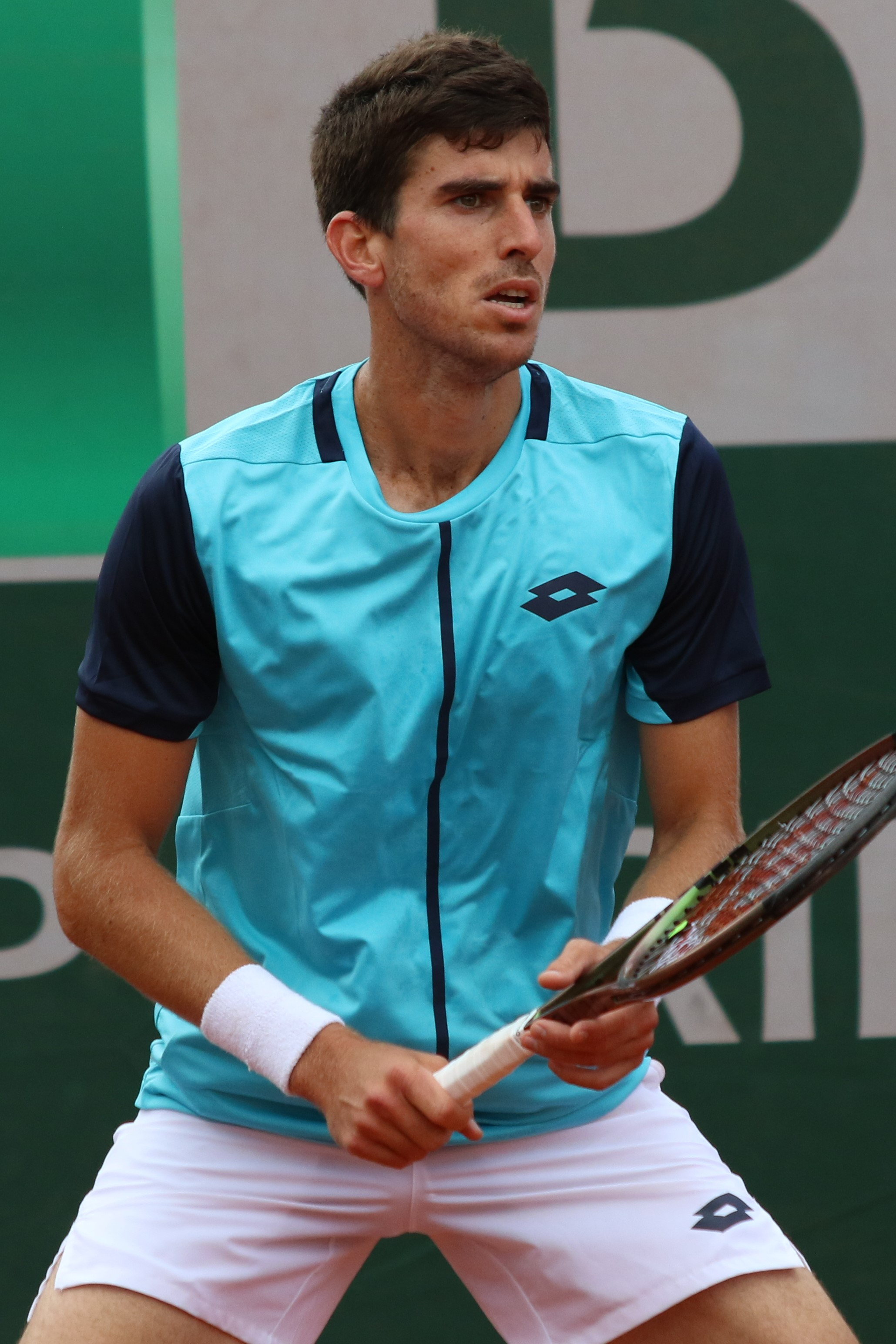
- Agamenone at the 2022 French Open
- Country (sports): Italy (2020–); Argentina (2008–20)
- Residence: Buenos Aires, Argentina
- Born: 15 April 1993 (age 33) Río Cuarto, Argentina
- Height: 1.91 m (6 ft 3 in)
- Turned pro: 2010
- Plays: Right-handed (two-handed backhand)
- Coach: Andrea Trono
- Prize money: US $698,594

Singles
- Career record: 3–2
- Career titles: 0
- Highest ranking: No. 108 (1 August 2022)
- Current ranking: No. 359 (19 October 2026)

Grand Slam singles results
- Australian Open: Q1 (2022, 2023, 2024)
- French Open: 1R (2022)
- Wimbledon: Q1 (2022, 2023, 2024)
- US Open: Q3 (2022)

Doubles
- Career record: 0–0
- Career titles: 0
- Highest ranking: No. 167 (15 October 2018)
- Current ranking: No. 701 (19 October 2026)
- Last updated on: 21 October 2026.

Franco Agamenone (born 15 April 1993) is an Italian–Argentine tennis player, who competes mainly on the ATP Challenger Tour. He has a career-high ATP singles ranking of World No. 108 achieved on 1 August 2022 and a career-high doubles ranking of No. 167 achieved on 15 October 2018.

He has won ten ATP Challenger titles, six in singles and four in doubles. Agamenone received a ten-month suspension from March 2019 until January 2020 for an anti-doping rule violation for unintentional use of hydrochlorothiazide.

== Career ==
In September 2020, Agamenone switched his tennis country of allegiance from Argentina to Italy.

Having never previously won a match at ATP Challenger level, Agamenone won the event in Prague in 2021, defeating Ryan Peniston in the final. The success took his ranking inside the top 300 for the first time. The following month, he repeated the feat, defeating Sebastián Báez to win in Kyiv.

In 2022, Agamenone's reached the semifinal at the ATP Challenger in Bendigo (l. Enzo Couacaud), pushed him into the top 200 for the first time.

He made his Grand Slam debut when he entered the 2022 French Open main draw as a lucky loser. He was defeated in the first round by Mackenzie McDonald. As a result, he reached the top 150 at World No. 148 on 6 July 2022.

He qualified for the 2022 Croatia Open Umag making his ATP debut and reached the quarterfinals defeating Laslo Djere, for his first ATP win, and fourth seed and world No. 32 Sebastián Báez. Next he defeated Marco Cecchinato to reach the first ATP semifinal of his career. As a result, he moved close to 30 positions in the rankings in the top 110 at No. 108 on 1 August 2022.

== Challenger and Futures finals ==
=== Singles: 27 (17–10) ===
Legend (singles) ATP Challenger Tour (6–0) ITF Futures/World Tennis Tour (11–10)	Titles by surface Hard (2–2) Clay (15–8) Grass (0–0) Carpet (0–0)

Result	W–L	Date	Tournament	Tier	Surface	Opponent	Score
Loss	0-1	Nov 2014	Chile F7, Concepción	Futures	Clay	(Chile) Matías Sborowitz	6–3, 5–7, 4–6
Win	1-1	May 2015	Argentina F4, Villa María	Futures	Clay	(Argentina) Hernán Casanova	6–3, 7–6^{(7–4)}
Win	2-1	Sep 2016	Tunisia F24, Hammamet	Futures	Clay	(France) Valentin Vacherot	6–0, 6–1
Win	3-1	Oct 2016	Ecuador F3, Salinas	Futures	Clay	(Ecuador) Roberto Quiroz	6–2, 6–7^{(3–7)}, 6–0
Win	4-1	Nov 2016	Bolivia F2, Cochabamba	Futures	Clay	(Argentina) Matías Zukas	6–2, 6–1
Loss	4-2	Aug 2017	Austria F5, Vogau	Futures	Clay	(Austria) Dennis Novak	3–6, 2–6
Loss	4-3	Sep 2017	Romania F12, Brașov	Futures	Clay	(Lithuania) Laurynas Grigelis	2–6, 2–6
Loss	4-4	Feb 2020	M25 Punta del Este, Uruguay	World Tennis Tour	Clay	(Argentina) Santiago Rodríguez Taverna	4–6, 3–6
Loss	4-5	Sep 2020	M15 Bucharest, Romania	World Tennis Tour	Clay	(Kazakhstan) Timofei Skatov	4–6, 4–6
Loss	4-6	Sep 2020	M15 Curtea de Arges, Romania	World Tennis Tour	Clay	(Croatia) Duje Ajduković	6–2, 4–6, 4–6
Win	5-6	Jan 2021	M15 Cairo, Egypt	World Tennis Tour	Clay	(Romania) Filip Cristian Jianu	7–6^{(7–0)}, 6–4
Loss	5-7	Mar 2021	M15 Monastir, Tunisia	World Tennis Tour	Hard	(Japan) Naoki Nakagawa	6–7^{(3–7)}, 4–6
Loss	5-8	Apr 2021	M15 Monastir, Tunisia	World Tennis Tour	Hard	(Tunisia) Aziz Dougaz	3–6, 4–6
Win	6-8	Apr 2021	M15 Monastir, Tunisia	World Tennis Tour	Hard	(France) Antoine Escoffier	6–7^{(2–7)}, 6–3, 6–2
Win	7-8	Apr 2021	M15 Monastir, Tunisia	World Tennis Tour	Hard	(Ivory Coast) Eliakim Coulibaly	6–2, 6–3
Loss	7-9	May 2021	M25 Most, Czech Republic	World Tennis Tour	Clay	(Czech Republic) Dalibor Svrcina	4–6, 6–7^{(3–7)}
Win	8-9	Jun 2021	M25 Montauban, France	World Tennis Tour	Clay	(France) Jonathan Eysseric	6-2, 6–1
Loss	8-10	Jul 2021	M25 Bourg-en-Bresse, France	World Tennis Tour	Clay	(Norway) Viktor Durasovic	1–6, 1–6
Win	9-10	Jul 2021	M25 Casinalbo, Italy	World Tennis Tour	Clay	(Italy) Matteo Arnaldi	6–4, 7–5
Win	10-10	Aug 2021	Prague, Czech Republic	Challenger	Clay	(United Kingdom) Ryan Peniston	6–3, 6–1
Win	11-10	Sep 2021	Kyiv, Ukraine	Challenger	Clay	(Argentina) Sebastián Báez	7–5, 6–2
Win	12-10	Apr 2022	Rome, Italy	Challenger	Clay	(Italy) Gian Marco Moroni	6–1, 6–4
Win	13-10	Jul 2023	Braunschweig, Germany	Challenger	Clay	Pavel Kotov	7–5, 6–3
Win	14-10	Dec 2024	M15 Antalya, Turkey	World Tennis Tour	Clay	(France) Arthur Reymond	6–2, 6–4
Win	15-10	Jun 2025	M25 Belgrade, Serbia	World Tennis Tour	Clay	(Ukraine) Eric Vanshelboim	7–6^{(7–4)}, 6–4
Win	16-10	Sep 2025	Târgu Mureș, Romania	Challenger	Clay	(United Kingdom) Jay Clarke	6–3, 6–4
Win	17-10	Jan 2026	Buenos Aires, Argentina	Challenger	Clay	(Argentina) Andrea Collarini	3–6, 6–4, 6–2

=== Doubles: 58 (42–16) ===
Legend (doubles) ATP Challenger Tour Finals (4–4) ITF Futures/World Tennis Tour Finals (38–12)	Titles by surface Hard (4–2) Clay (38–14) Grass (0–0) Carpet (0–0)

Result	W–L	Date	Tournament	Tier	Surface	Partner	Opponents	Score
Loss	0–1	Aug 2010	Argentina F15, Buenos Aires	Futures	Clay	(Argentina) Facundo Argüello	(Argentina) Guillermo Bujniewicz (Argentina) Guillermo Durán	4–6, 2–6
Win	1–1	Jun 2012	Argentina F12, Posadas	Futures	Clay	(Argentina) Facundo Argüello	(Brazil) Diego Matos (Argentina) Juan Vázquez-Valenzuela	6–2, 6–2
Loss	1–2	Dec 2012	Argentina F28, Río Cuarto	Futures	Clay	(Argentina) José Ángel Carrizo	(Peru) Sergio Galdós (Argentina) Mateo Nicolás Martínez	6–7^{(3–7)}, 4–6
Loss	1–3	May 2013	Argentina F6, Río Cuarto	Futures	Clay	(Argentina) José Ángel Carrizo	(Peru) Duilio Beretta (Peru) Sergio Galdós	6–4, 4–6, [1–10]
Win	2–3	Aug 2015	Argentina F9, Chaco	Futures	Clay	(Argentina) Patricio Heras	(Argentina) Hernán Casanova (Argentina) Juan Pablo Ficovich	6–4, 6–0
Win	3–3	Oct 2015	Argentina F14, San Juan	Futures	Clay	(Argentina) Franco Emanuel Egea	(Argentina) Franco Capalbo (Argentina) Gerónimo Espín Busleiman	6–2, 7–5
Win	4–3	Dec 2015	Chile F8, Temuco	Futures	Clay	(Argentina) Patricio Heras	(Chile) Marcelo Tomás Barrios Vera (Chile) Jorge Montero	2–6, 7–6^{(7–5)}, [10–8]
Win	5–3	Dec 2015	Chile F10, Puerto Montt	Futures	Hard	(Argentina) Tomás Lipovšek Puches	(Chile) Marcelo Tomás Barrios Vera (Chile) Jorge Montero	6–3, 3–6, [10–3]
Win	6–3	Mar 2016	Argentina F6, Olavarría	Futures	Clay	(Argentina) Juan Pablo Paz	(Brazil) Oscar José Gutierrez (Argentina) Gabriel Alejandro Hidalgo	2–6, 6–3, [10–7]
Win	7–3	Apr 2016	Italy F7, Santa Margherita di Pula	Futures	Clay	(Argentina) Francisco Bahamonde	(Germany) Julian Onken (Germany) Leon Schütt	6–3, 6–3
Win	8–3	May 2016	Italy F10, Santa Margherita di Pula	Futures	Clay	(Argentina) Mateo Nicolás Martínez	(Greece) Petros Tsitsipas (Greece) Stefanos Tsitsipas	6–2, 6–2
Win	9–3	Jun 2016	Turkey F24, Antalya	Futures	Hard	(Argentina) Nicolás Alberto Arreche	(Turkey) Cem İlkel (Australia) Goran Marijan	7–6^{(7–5)}, 6–7^{(3–7)}, [13–11]
Win	10–3	Jul 2016	Turkey F27, Antalya	Futures	Hard	(Argentina) Mariano Kestelboim	(Brazil) Pedro Bernardi (Brazil) Fabiano de Paula	6–4, 6–3
Win	11–3	Sep 2016	Tunisia F22, Hammamet	Futures	Clay	(Argentina) Mariano Kestelboim	(France) Benjamin Bonzi (France) Fabien Reboul	6–2, 2–6, [10–7]
Loss	11–4	Sep 2016	Tunisia F23, Hammamet	Futures	Clay	(Argentina) Mariano Kestelboim	(France) Benjamin Bonzi (France) Fabien Reboul	6–2, 5–7, [4–10]
Win	12–4	Sep 2016	Tunisia F24, Hammamet	Futures	Clay	(Argentina) Mariano Kestelboim	(Argentina) Eduardo Agustín Torre (Uruguay) Nicolás Xiviller	6–2, 6–3
Win	13–4	Oct 2016	Ecuador F3, Salinas	Futures	Clay	(Bolivia) Federico Zeballos	(Chile) Jorge Montero (Argentina) Matías Zukas	7–6^{(7–3)}, 6–4
Win	14–4	Nov 2016	Bolivia F2, Cochabamba	Futures	Clay	(Argentina) Matías Zukas	(Peru) Mauricio Echazú (Peru) Jorge Brian Panta	7–6^{(7–3)}, 6–3
Win	15–4	Dec 2016	Chile F7, Talca	Futures	Clay	(Argentina) Franco Emanuel Egea	(Brazil) Marcelo Tebet (Brazil) Fernando Yamacita	6–3, 6–3
Loss	15–5	Feb 2017	China F2, Anning	Futures	Clay	(Argentina) Matías Zukas	(Chinese Taipei) Huang Liang-chi (Japan) Issei Okamura	1–6, 4–6
Win	16–5	Apr 2017	Tunisia F15, Hammamet	Futures	Clay	(Argentina) Hernán Casanova	(France) Geoffrey Blancaneaux (France) Antoine Hoang	7–5, 1–6, [10–5]
Win	17–5	May 2017	Italy F13, Vigevano	Futures	Clay	(Argentina) Andrea Collarini	(Austria) Sebastian Bader (United States) Hunter Reese	6–4, 6–3
Win	18–5	May 2017	Bosnia & Herzegovina F1, Doboj	Futures	Clay	(Brazil) Thales Turini	(North Macedonia) Tomislav Jotovski (Serbia) Milan Radojković	6–3, 6–2
Loss	18–6	Jun 2017	Bosnia & Herzegovina F2, Brčko	Futures	Hard	(Mexico) Lucas Gómez	(Australia) Adam Taylor (Australia) Jason Taylor	6–7^{(3–7)}, 1–6
Loss	18–7	Jun 2017	Italy F16, Padova	Futures	Clay	(Argentina) Facundo Mena	(Italy) Julian Ocleppo (Italy) Andrea Vavassori	6–4, 1–6, [8–10]
Loss	18–8	Jun 2017	Italy F17, Bergamo	Futures	Clay	(Brazil) Fernando Romboli	(Italy) Walter Trusendi (Italy) Andrea Vavassori	1–6, 6–3, [11–13]
Win	19–8	Aug 2017	Austria F5, Vogau	Futures	Clay	(Argentina) Matías Zukas	(Argentina) Felipe Martínez Sarrasague (Brazil) Fernando Yamacita	6–4, 6–4
Win	20–8	Aug 2017	Turkey F30, Istanbul	Futures	Clay	(Argentina) Matías Zukas	(Spain) Sergio Martos Gornés (Spain) Pol Toledo Bagué	6–2, 1–6, [17–15]
Win	21–8	Aug 2017	Romania F11, Chitila	Futures	Clay	(Romania) Patrick Grigoriu	(Romania) Adrian Barbu (Romania) Florin Mergea	2–6, 6–2, [10–8]
Win	22–8	Sep 2017	Spain F28, Oviedo	Futures	Clay	(Brazil) João Menezes	(Norway) Viktor Durasovic (Spain) Miguel Semmler	7–5, 6–3
Win	23–8	Nov 2017	Santiago, Chile	Challenger	Clay	(Argentina) Facundo Argüello	(Argentina) Máximo González (Chile) Nicolás Jarry	6–4, 3–6, [10–6]
Win	24–8	Dec 2017	Argentina F11, Mendoza	Futures	Clay	(Argentina) Patricio Heras	(Argentina) Juan Ignacio Ameal (Argentina) Santiago Besada	6–3, 6–2
Win	25–8	Dec 2017	Argentina F12, San Juan	Futures	Clay	(Argentina) Patricio Heras	(Brazil) Daniel Dutra da Silva (Brazil) Augusto Laranja	6–3, 4–6, [10–8]
Win	26–8	May 2018	Italy F11, Napoli	Futures	Clay	(Argentina) Patricio Heras	(United States) Ulises Blanch (Argentina) Franco Capalbo	6–3, 6–4
Win	27–8	Jun 2018	Romania F2, Bacău	Futures	Clay	(Argentina) Hernán Casanova	(Hungary) Gábor Borsos (Ecuador) Gonzalo Escobar	6–2, 6–3
Win	28–8	Jun 2018	Hungary F5, Budapest	Futures	Clay	(Argentina) Patricio Heras	(Sweden) Gustav Hansson (Sweden) Fred Simonsson	1–6, 6–2, [10–7]
Win	29–8	Sep 2018	Argentina F4, Rosario	Futures	Clay	(Argentina) Matías Zukas	(Argentina) Maximiliano Estévez (Brazil) Rafael Matos	6–3, 7–6^{(7–5)}
Win	30–8	Sep 2018	Argentina F5, Villa del Dique	Futures	Clay	(Argentina) Alejo Vilaro	(Argentina) Maximiliano Estévez (Argentina) Facundo Juárez	2–6, 6–4, [10–7]
Loss	30–9	Sep 2018	Argentina F6, Buenos Aires	Futures	Clay	(Argentina) Maximiliano Estévez	(Argentina) Juan Ignacio Galarza (Argentina) Mariano Kestelboim	6–7^{(5–7)}, 2–6
Loss	30–10	Oct 2018	Campinas, Brazil	Challenger	Clay	(Brazil) Fernando Romboli	(Bolivia) Hugo Dellien (Argentina) Guillermo Durán	5–7, 4–6
Win	31–10	Mar 2019	Santiago, Chile	Challenger	Clay	(Brazil) Fernando Romboli	(Argentina) Facundo Argüello (Uruguay) Martín Cuevas	7–6^{(7–5)}, 1–6, [10–6]
Win	32–10	Mar 2019	M15 Pinamar, Argentina	World Tennis Tour	Clay	(Argentina) Hernán Casanova	(Argentina) Nicolas Alberto Arreche (Argentina) Manuel Peña López	7–5, 6–3
Loss	32–11	Apr 2019	M15 Tabarka, Tunisia	World Tennis Tour	Clay	(Argentina) Franco Emanuel Egea	(Brazil) Orlando Luz (Brazil) Rafael Matos	4–6, 4–6
Win	33–11	Feb 2020	M25 Punta del Este, Uruguay	World Tennis Tour	Clay	(Brazil) Daniel Dutra da Silva	(Peru) Alexander Merino (Argentina) Manuel Peña López	6–0, 6–1
Win	34–11	Jan 2021	M15 Cairo, Egypt	World Tennis Tour	Clay	(Poland) Piotr Matuszewski	(Japan) Naoki Tajima (Spain) Jose Fco. Vidal Azorin	4-6, 7-6^{(7–5)}, 10–7
Win	35–11	Jan 2021	M15 Cairo, Egypt	World Tennis Tour	Clay	(Argentina) Hernán Casanova	(Japan) Ken Onishi (Japan) Jumpei Yamasaki	6-1, 6–4
Loss	35–12	Apr 2021	M15 Monastir, Tunisia	World Tennis Tour	Hard	(Poland) Piotr Matuszewski	(Tunisia) Aziz Dougaz (Zimbabwe) Benjamin Lock	6-7^{(2–7)}, 6–3, 9–11
Win	36–12	Apr 2021	M15 Monastir, Tunisia	World Tennis Tour	Hard	(Poland) Piotr Matuszewski	(Brazil) Igor Marcondes (Brazil) Mateus Alves	7-6^{(9–7)}, 7–5
Win	37–12	May 2021	M25 Prague, Czech Republic	World Tennis Tour	Clay	(Poland) Piotr Matuszewski	(Czech Republic) Patrik Rikl (Czech Republic) Andrew Paulson	6-4, 6–3
Win	38–12	May 2021	M25 Most, Czech Republic	World Tennis Tour	Clay	(Poland) Piotr Matuszewski	(Netherlands) Gijs Brouwer (Netherlands) Mats Hermans	7-5, 6–3
Loss	38–13	Jun 2021	M25 Grasse, France	World Tennis Tour	Clay	(Poland) Piotr Matuszewski	(France) Dan Added (Switzerland) Leandro Riedi	1-6, 4–6
Win	39–13	Mar 2022	Roseto degli Abruzzi, Italy	Challenger	Clay	(France) Manuel Guinard	(Serbia) Ivan Sabanov (Serbia) Matej Sabanov	7–6^{(7–2)}, 7–6^{(7–3)}
Loss	39–14	Mar 2022	Zadar, Croatia	Challenger	Clay	(France) Manuel Guinard	(Czech Republic) Zdeněk Kolář (Italy) Andrea Vavassori	6–3, 6-7^{(7–9)}, [6–10]
Win	40–14	Oct 2022	Coquimbo, Chile	Challenger	Clay	(Argentina) Hernán Casanova	(Poland) Karol Drzewiecki (Switzerland) Jakub Paul	6–3, 6–4
Loss	40–15	Oct 2023	Santa Fe, Argentina	Challenger	Clay	(Argentina) Mariano Kestelboim	(Switzerland) Luca Margaroli (Argentina) Santiago Rodríguez Taverna	6-7^{(2–7)}, 4–6
Win	41–15	Nov 2024	M25 Antalya, Turkey	World Tennis Tour	Clay	(Italy) Facundo Juárez	(Bulgaria) Georgi Georgiev; Ivan Gretskiy	7-6^{(7–3)}, 6–1
Win	42–15	Jun 2025	M25 Târgu Mureș, Romania	World Tennis Tour	Clay	(Spain) Àlex Martí Pujolràs	(France) Corentin Denolly (Romania) Bogdan Pavel	3–6, 6–1, [10–8]
Loss	42–16	Sep 2026	Biella, Italy	Challenger	Clay	(Argentina) Máximo Zeitune	(Italy) Francesco Forti (Italy) Filippo Romano	6–4, 5–7, [8–10]
