= Gonzalo Oliveira =

Venezuelan-Portuguese tennis player

- Country (sports): Portugal; Venezuela (since 2024)
- Residence: Alvor, Portugal
- Born: 17 February 1995 (age 31) Porto, Portugal
- Height: 1.85 m (6 ft 1 in)
- Turned pro: 2012
- Retired: Dec 2024 (last match played)
- Plays: Left-handed (two-handed backhand)
- Coach: Abilio Oliviera (father)
- Prize money: US $ 543,945

Singles
- Highest ranking: No. 194 (25 December 2017)

Grand Slam singles results
- Australian Open: Q1 (2024)
- French Open: Q3 (2018)
- Wimbledon: Q1 (2018)

Doubles
- Career record: 4–2
- Career titles: 0
- Highest ranking: No. 77 (24 August 2020)

Grand Slam doubles results
- Wimbledon: Q1 (2018)
- Last updated on: 17 November 2025.

Gonzalo Oliveira (born 17 February 1995 as Gonçalo Oliveira) is a Portuguese-born Venezuelan former tennis player who competed on the ATP Challenger Tour. He has a career high ATP singles ranking of world No. 194 achieved on 25 December 2017. He also has a career high doubles ranking of No. 77 achieved on 24 August 2020.

== Career ==
On 18 March 2019, Olivera reached the top 100 in the doubles rankings at world No. 99, the seventh Portuguese player to accomplish the feat. In April 2024, he opted to represent Venezuela internationally.

In November 2024, he captured his maiden ATP Challenger Tour singles title at the inaugural edition of the 2024 Brazzaville Challenger, becoming the first player representing Venezuela to win a Challenger title in 24 years, since Jimy Szymanski in Tulsa in 2000. A month later, he reached his second Challenger singles final at the 2024 Manzanillo Open, where he lost to Mats Rosenkranz.

== ITIA four-year tour ban ==
Following a provisional suspension, in October 2025 Oliveira was issued with a four-year ban by the International Tennis Integrity Agency (ITIA) backdated to January 2025 for an anti-doping rule violation after testing positive for methamphetamine. The test was taken at an ATP Challenger event in Manzanillo, Mexico in November 2024. Oliveira argued that he came into contact with the substance following a kiss but after a review, an independent tribunal ruled that he could not prove that his exposure to the drug was unintentional and issued the ban on 10 October 2025. His results from 25 November 2024 onwards were disqualified.

== ATP Challenger and ITF Tour finals ==
=== Singles: 30 (18 titles, 12 runner-ups) ===
Legend ATP Challenger Tour (1–1) ITF Futures/WTT (17–11)	Finals by surface Hard (6–5) Clay (12–7) Grass (0–0)

Result	W–L	Date	Tournament	Tier	Surface	Opponent	Score
Win	1–0	Sep 2015	Belgium F13, Arlon	Futures	Clay	(Belgium) Clément Geens	6–0, 6–3
Win	2–0	Jul 2016	Austria F1, Telfs	Futures	Clay	(Germany) Yannick Hanfmann	7–6^{(7–4)}, 3–6, 6–1
Loss	2–1	Aug 2016	Austria F5, Innsbruck	Futures	Clay	(Austria) Sebastian Ofner	2–6, 3–6
Loss	2–2	Nov 2016	Tunisia F33, Hammamet	Futures	Clay	(Spain) Carlos Taberner	4–6, 5–7
Loss	2–3	Dec 2016	Tunisia F35, Hammamet	Futures	Clay	(Hungary) Attila Balázs	2–6, 3–6
Loss	2–4	Jan 2017	Tunisia F2, Hammamet	Futures	Clay	(Portugal) João Domingues	6–2, 4–6, 3–6
Loss	2–5	Mar 2017	Tunisia F9, Hammamet	Futures	Clay	(Spain) Oriol Roca Batalla	1–6, 4–6
Win	3–5	May 2017	Romania F2, Bacău	Futures	Clay	(India) Sumit Nagal	3–6, 6–3, 6–0
Win	4–5	Jun 2017	Hungary F5, Budapest	Futures	Clay	(Serbia) Peđa Krstin	6–2, 6–2
Win	5–5	Dec 2017	Tunisia F37, Hammamet	Futures	Clay	(Italy) Raúl Brancaccio	6–3, 6–2
Win	6–5	Dec 2017	Tunisia F38, Hammamet	Futures	Clay	(Serbia) Dejan Katić	7–6^{(7–5)}, 3–6, 6–3
Loss	6–6	Dec 2017	Tunisia F39, Hammamet	Futures	Clay	(Serbia) Miljan Zekić	1–4 ret.
Win	7–6	Dec 2018	Qatar F4, Doha	Futures	Hard	(Russia) Aslan Karatsev	6–3, 7–5
Loss	7–7	Dec 2018	Qatar F5, Doha	Futures	Hard	(France) Tak Khunn Wang	3–6, 3–6
Win	8–7	Mar 2023	M25 Loulé, Portugal	WTT	Hard	(France) Lucas Poullain	6–3, 6–2
Win	9–7	Mar 2023	M25 Portimão, Portugal	WTT	Hard	(Australia) Akira Santillan	7–6^{(7–2)}, 6–4
Win	10–7	Apr 2023	M25 Santha Margherita di Pula, Italy	WTT	Clay	(Poland) Daniel Michalski	6–3, 6–2
Win	11–7	Jun 2023	M25 Rome, Italy	WTT	Clay	(Italy) Luca Potenza	6–2, 6–1
Win	12–7	Jul 2023	M15 Wrocław, Poland	WTT	Clay	(Czech Republic) Jiří Barnat	6–2, 6–4
Win	13–7	Jul 2023	M15 Sofia, Bulgaria	WTT	Clay	(Germany) Marvin Möller	6–3, 6–1
Win	14–7	Jul 2023	M25 Castelo Branco, Portugal	WTT	Hard	(Italy) Fabrizio Andaloro	6–2, 6–1
Win	15–7	Sep 2023	M25 Idanha-a-Nova, Portugal	WTT	Hard	(Spain) Alberto Barroso Campos	6–4, 6–4
Loss	15–8	Oct 2023	M15 Al Zahra, Kuwait	WTT	Hard	(Bulgaria) Petr Nesterov	6–4, 4–6, 3–6
Loss	15–9	Nov 2023	M25 Hua Hin, Thailand	WTT	Hard	(United States) Andre Ilagan	3–6 ret.
Win	16–9	Nov 2023	M25 Hua Hin, Thailand	WTT	Hard	Evgeny Donskoy	4–6, 6–2, 6–4
Win	17–9	Aug 2024	M25 Brazzaville, Congo	WTT	Clay	(Slovenia) Bor Artnak	6–4, 6–2
Loss	17–10	Aug 2024	M25 Brazzaville, Congo	WTT	Clay	(France) Mathys Erhard	2–6, 5–7
Loss	17–11	Sep 2024	M25 Sapporo, Japan	WTT	Hard	(Japan) Takuya Kumasaka	2–6, 4–6
Win	18–11	Oct 2024	Brazzaville, Congo	Challenger	Clay	(Romania) Filip Cristian Jianu	6–4, 6–3
Loss	18–12	Dec 2024	Manzanillo, Mexico	Challenger	Hard	(Germany) Mats Rosenkranz	3–6, 4–6

=== Doubles: 73 (35 titles, 38 runner-ups) ===
Legend ATP Challenger Tour (12–17) ITF Futures/WTT (23–21)	Finals by surface Hard (6–7) Clay (28–31) Grass (0–0) Carpet (1–0)

Result	W–L	Date	Tournament	Tier	Surface	Partner	Opponents	Score
Loss	0–1	May 2013	Spain F12, Balaguer	Futures	Clay	(Denmark) Jesper Korsbæk Jensen	(United Kingdom) Alexander Slabinsky (Spain) Ferran Ventura-Martell	6–3, 3–6, [9–11]
Loss	0–2	Mar 2014	Spain F5, Reus	Futures	Clay	(Spain) Iván Gómez Mantilla	(Australia) Jason Kubler (Spain) Pol Toledo Bagué	4–6, 1–6
Win	1–2	Apr 2014	Italy F11, Santa Margherita di Pula	Futures	Clay	(Spain) Albert Alcaraz Ivorra	(Italy) Lorenzo Frigerio (Italy) Luca Vanni	1–6, 7–5, [11–9]
Win	2–2	Jul 2014	Austria F3, Telfs	Futures	Clay	(Austria) Patrick Ofner	(Austria) Sebastian Bader (Australia) Gavin van Peperzeel	6–2, 3–6, [10–7]
Loss	2–3	Aug 2014	Slovakia F3, Piešťany	Futures	Clay	(Ukraine) Danylo Kalenichenko	(Slovakia) Karol Beck (Ukraine) Filipp Kekercheni	2–6, 6–2, [8–10]
Loss	2–4	Aug 2014	Austria F9, Pörtschach	Futures	Clay	(Germany) Daniel Uhlig	(Austria) Sebastian Bader (Austria) Tristan-Samuel Weissborn	4–6, 6–7^{(3–7)}
Loss	2–5	Sep 2014	Italy F31, Santa Margherita di Pula	Futures	Clay	(Spain) Marcos Giraldi Requena	(Italy) Federico Maccari (Italy) Gianluca Mager	6–3, 4–6, [6–10]
Loss	2–6	Sep 2014	Italy F33, Santa Margherita di Pula	Futures	Clay	(Italy) Gianluca Mager	(Italy) Omar Giacalone (Italy) Pietro Rondoni	5–7, 1–6
Win	3–6	Oct 2014	Italy F34, Santa Margherita di Pula	Futures	Clay	(Italy) Daniele Capecchi	(Italy) Pietro Rondoni (Italy) Walter Trusendi	2–6, 6–1, [11–9]
Loss	3–7	Jan 2015	Spain F1, Castelldefels	Futures	Clay	(Australia) Jake Eames	(Spain) Sergio Martos Gornés (Spain) Pol Toledo Bagué	2–6, 3–6
Loss	3–8	May 2015	Italy F10, Bergamo	Futures	Clay	(France) Alexandre Sidorenko	(Italy) Riccardo Bonadio (Italy) Pietro Rondoni	4–6, 3–6
Win	4–8	Jun 2015	Slovenia F1, Maribor	Futures	Clay	(Ukraine) Danylo Kalenichenko	(Slovenia) Rok Jarc (Slovenia) Mike Urbanija	6–4, 7–6^{(7–3)}
Win	5–8	Jun 2015	Slovenia F2, Ljubljana	Futures	Clay	(Ukraine) Danylo Kalenichenko	(Austria) Lucas Miedler (Austria) Maximilian Neuchrist	7–5, 7–6^{(7–3)}
Loss	5–9	Jun 2015	Slovenia F2, Litija	Futures	Clay	(Chile) Cristóbal Saavedra Corvalán	(Czech Republic) Filip Brtnický (Czech Republic) Dominik Süč	5–7, 6–2, [5–10]
Win	6–9	Aug 2015	Netherlands F5, Oldenzaal	Futures	Clay	(Brazil) Pedro Bernardi	(Republic of Ireland) Sam Barry (Netherlands) Niels Lootsma	6–2, 6–4
Win	7–9	Sep 2015	Belgium F14, Middelkerke	Futures	Clay	(Belgium) Joran Vliegen	(Germany) Timon Reichelt (Germany) George von Massow	6–3, 3–6, [10–4]
Win	8–9	Oct 2015	France F20, Forbach	Futures	Carpet (i)	(France) Matthieu Roy	(France) Constantin Belot (France) Thibault Venturino	6–7^{(5–7)}, 6–4, [10–6]
Loss	8–10	Oct 2015	France F22, Saint-Dizier	Futures	Hard (i)	(France) Ronan Joncour	(Netherlands) Sander Arends (Netherlands) Niels Lootsma	5–7, 6–7^{(8–10)}
Loss	8–11	Dec 2015	DR F1, Santiago de los Caballeros	Futures	Clay	(Germany) Peter Torebko	(United States) Max Schnur (United States) Raleigh Smith	6–7^{(7–9)}, 2–6
Win	9–11	Jan 2016	Spain F1, Castelldefels	Futures	Clay	(Bosnia and Herzegovina) Tomislav Brkić	(France) Samuel Bensoussan (Czech Republic) Michal Schmid	6–2, 3–6, [10–1]
Win	10–11	Feb 2016	Spain F3, Peguera	Futures	Clay	(Bosnia and Herzegovina) Tomislav Brkić	(Italy) Pietro Rondoni (Italy) Jacopo Stefanini	6–7^{(6–8)}, 6–3, [10–6]
Loss	10–12	Mar 2016	Spain F6, Tarragona	Futures	Clay	(Japan) Akira Santillan	(Spain) Marc López (Spain) Jaume Munar	7–6^{(7–4)}, 3–6, [7–10]
Loss	10–13	May 2016	France F9, Grasse	Futures	Clay	(Spain) Marc Fornell Mestres	(Belgium) Maxime Authom (Germany) Andreas Beck	4–6, 3–6
Loss	10–14	Jul 2016	Italy F18, Albinea	Futures	Clay	(Italy) Federico Maccari	(Italy) Andrea Basso (Italy) Francesco Moncagatto	6–7^{(4–7)}, 3–6
Win	11–14	Jul 2016	Austria F4, Wels	Futures	Clay	(Austria) Sebastian Bader	(Austria) Lenny Hampel (Austria) David Pichler	7–5, 6–3
Win	12–14	Aug 2016	Switzerland F3, Collonge-Bellerive	Futures	Clay	(France) Fabien Reboul	(Switzerland) Antoine Bellier (France) Hugo Nys	6–3, 7–5
Win	13–14	Aug 2016	Switzerland F4, Lausanne	Futures	Clay	(France) Fabien Reboul	(Argentina) Federico Coria (Switzerland) Louroi Martinez	7–5, 6–2
Win	14–14	Sep 2016	Switzerland F5, Sion	Futures	Clay	(France) Fabien Reboul	(Argentina) Federico Coria (Switzerland) Louroi Martinez	6–3, 6–3
Loss	14–15	Sep 2016	Spain F29, Oviedo	Futures	Clay	(Spain) Marc Fornell Mestres	(Spain) Eduard Esteve Lobato (Germany) Jean-Marc Werner	1–6, 1–6
Loss	14–16	Oct 2016	Portugal F12, Porto	Futures	Clay	(Spain) Marc Fornell Mestres	(Portugal) Frederico Gil (Spain) Marc Giner	6–3, 3–6, [3–10]
Loss	14–17	Nov 2016	Tunisia F30, Hammamet	Futures	Clay	(Lithuania) Lukas Mugevičius	(Portugal) Felipe Cunha e Silva (Portugal) Frederico Gil	6–7^{(2–7)}, 6–7^{(5–7)}
Win	15–17	Nov 2016	Tunisia F33, Hammamet	Futures	Clay	(Hungary) Attila Balázs	(Spain) Sergio Martos Gornés (Spain) Pol Toledo Bagué	6–4, 6–3
Win	16–17	Dec 2016	Tunisia F34, Hammamet	Futures	Clay	(Switzerland) Loïc Perret	(Brazil) Igor Marcondes (Brazil) Felipe Meligeni Alves	6–1, 3–6, [10–3]
Loss	16–18	Dec 2016	Tunisia F35, Hammamet	Futures	Clay	(Ukraine) Filipp Kekercheni	(Italy) Filippo Baldi (Italy) Alessandro Petrone	6–1, 3–6, [9–11]
Win	17–18	Mar 2017	Portugal F1, Vale do Lobo	Futures	Hard	(Italy) Erik Crepaldi	(Norway) Viktor Durasovic (Austria) Lucas Miedler	1–6, 6–2, [10–5]
Win	18–18	Apr 2017	Tunisia F12, Hammamet	Futures	Clay	(Morocco) Lamine Ouahab	(Argentina) Juan Ignacio Galarza (Chile) Cristóbal Saavedra Corvalán	6–1, 6–1
Loss	18–19	Apr 2017	Portugal F5, Cascais	Futures	Clay	(Ukraine) Marat Deviatiarov	(Belgium) Clément Geens (Belgium) Jeroen Vanneste	1–6, 6–4, [4–10]
Win	19–19	May 2017	Tunisia F19, Hammamet	Futures	Clay	(Argentina) Mariano Kestelboim	(Italy) Cristian Carli (Italy) Nicolò Turchetti	6–0, 6–1
Loss	19–20	Jun 2017	Tunisia F22, Hammamet	Futures	Clay	(Tunisia) Moez Echargui	(Tunisia) Aziz Dougaz (Tunisia) Skander Mansouri	6–7^{(4–7)}, 1–6
Loss	0–1	Jun 2017	Lisbon, Portugal	Challenger	Clay	(Portugal) Frederico Gil	(Indonesia) Christopher Rungkat (South Africa) Ruan Roelofse	6–7^{(7–9)}, 1–6
Loss	0–2	Jun 2017	Poznań, Poland	Challenger	Clay	(Poland) Tomasz Bednarek	(Argentina) Guido Andreozzi (Spain) Jaume Munar	7–6^{(7–4)}, 3–6, [4–10]
Win	20–20	Aug 2017	Italy F25, Cornaiano	Futures	Clay	(Netherlands) David Pel	(Italy) Gianluca Di Nicola (Italy) Lorenzo Sonego	6–3, 6–2
Loss	0–3	Oct 2017	Lima, Peru	Challenger	Clay	(Poland) Grzegorz Panfil	(Mexico) Miguel Ángel Reyes-Varela (Slovenia) Blaž Rola	5–7, 3–6
Win	21–20	Dec 2017	Tunisia F39, Hammamet	Futures	Clay	(Italy) Raúl Brancaccio	(Italy) Marco Bortolotti (Spain) Oriol Roca Batalla	7–6^{(7–5)}, 6–2
Win	22–20	Dec 2017	Hong Kong F4, Hong Kong	Futures	Hard	(Chinese Taipei) Chen Ti	(Japan) Shintaro Imai (South Korea) Kim Cheong-eui	4–6, 7–5, [10–8]
Loss	0–4	Jan 2018	Bangkok, Thailand	Challenger	Hard	(Czech Republic) Zdeněk Kolář	(Spain) Marcel Granollers (Spain) Gerard Granollers	3–6, 6–7^{(6–8)}
Win	1–4	May 2018	Ostrava, Czech Republic	Challenger	Clay	(Hungary) Attila Balázs	(Czech Republic) Lukáš Rosol (Ukraine) Sergiy Stakhovsky	6–0, 7–5
Win	2–4	Jun 2018	Shymkent, Kazakhstan	Challenger	Clay	(Italy) Lorenzo Giustino	(Austria) Lucas Miedler (Austria) Sebastian Ofner	6–2, 7–6^{(7–4)}
Loss	2–5	Jul 2018	Båstad, Sweden	Challenger	Clay	(Czech Republic) Zdeněk Kolář	(Finland) Harri Heliövaara (Switzerland) Henri Laaksonen	4–6, 3–6
Loss	2–6	Jul 2018	Scheveningen, Netherlands	Challenger	Clay	(Venezuela) Luis David Martínez	(Philippines) Ruben Gonzales (United States) Nathaniel Lammons	3–6, 7–6^{(10–8)}, [5–10]
Loss	2–7	Sep 2018	Cassis, France	Challenger	Hard	(Switzerland) Marc-Andrea Hüsler	(Australia) Matt Reid (Ukraine) Sergiy Stakhovsky	2–6, 3–6
Win	3–7	Nov 2018	Kobe, Japan	Challenger	Hard (i)	(Australia) Akira Santillan	(China) Li Zhe (Japan) Go Soeda	2–6, 6–4, [12–10]
Loss	22–21	Dec 2018	Qatar F4, Doha	Futures	Hard	(Portugal) Bernardo Saraiva	(Russia) Alexander Igoshin (Russia) Evgenii Tiurnev	6–7^{(12–14)}, 3–6
Win	23–21	Dec 2018	Qatar F5, Doha	Futures	Hard	(Portugal) Bernardo Saraiva	(Italy) Adelchi Virgili (Qatar) Mubarak Shannan Zayid	4–6, 6–3, [13–11]
Loss	3–8	Jan 2019	Orlando, USA	Challenger	Hard	(Italy) Andrea Vavassori	(Monaco) Romain Arneodo (Belarus) Andrei Vasilevski	6–7^{(2–7)}, 6–2, [13–15]
Win	4–8	Feb 2019	Bangkok, Thailand	Challenger	Hard	(China) Li Zhe	(Spain) Enrique López Pérez (Japan) Hiroki Moriya	6–2, 6–1
Loss	4–9	Mar 2019	Shenzhen, China, P.R.	Challenger	Hard	(China) Li Zhe	(Chinese Taipei) Hsieh Cheng-peng (Indonesia) Christopher Rungkat	4–6, 6–3, [6–10]
Loss	4–10	May 2019	Shymkent, Kazakhstan	Challenger	Hard	(Belarus) Andrei Vasilevski	(Austria) Jurij Rodionov (Finland) Emil Ruusuvuori	4–6, 6–3, [8–10]
Win	5–10	May 2019	Samarkand, Uzbekistan	Challenger	Clay	(Belarus) Andrei Vasilevski	(Uzbekistan) Sergey Fomin (Russia) Teymuraz Gabashvili	3–6, 6–3, [10–4]
Win	6–10	June 2019	Vicenza, Italy	Challenger	Clay	(Belarus) Andrei Vasilevski	(Brazil) Fabrício Neis (Brazil) Fernando Romboli	6–3, 6–4
Loss	6–11	June 2019	Almaty, Kazakhstan	Challenger	Clay	(Belarus) Andrei Vasilevski	(Slovakia) Andrej Martin (Chile) Hans Podlipnik	6–7^{(4–7)}, 6–3, [8–10]
Win	7–11	July 2019	Recanati, Italy	Challenger	Clay	(India) Ramkumar Ramanathan	(Spain) David Vega Hernández (Italy) Andrea Vavassori	6–2, 6–4
Loss	7–12	Feb 2020	Drummondville, Canada	Challenger	Hard (i)	(Dominican Republic) Roberto Cid Subervi	(France) Manuel Guinard (France) Arthur Rinderknech	6–7^{(4–7)}, 6-7^{(3–7)}
Loss	7–13	Aug 2020	Prague, Czech Republic	Challenger	Clay	(Sweden) André Göransson	(Netherlands) Sander Arends (Netherlands) David Pel	5-7, 6-7^{(5–7)}
Win	8–13	Oct 2020	Lisbon, Portugal	Challenger	Clay	(Dominican Republic) Roberto Cid Subervi	(Finland) Harri Heliövaara (Czech Republic) Zdeněk Kolář	7–6^{(7–5)}, 4–6, [10–4]
Win	9–13	Mar 2021	Santiago, Chile	Challenger	Clay	(Venezuela) Luis David Martínez	(Brazil) Rafael Matos (Brazil) Felipe Meligeni Alves	7–5, 6-1
Win	10–13	Mar 2021	Prostějov, Czech Republic	Challenger	Clay	(Kazakhstan) Aleksandr Nedovyesov	(Czech Republic) Roman Jebavý (Czech Republic) Zdeněk Kolář	1–6, 7–6^{(7–5)}, [10–6]
Loss	10–14	Jul 2021	Amersfoort, Netherlands	Challenger	Clay	(Peru) Sergio Galdós	(Switzerland) Luca Castelnuovo (France) Manuel Guinard	6–0, 4–6, [9–11]
Loss	10–15	Aug 2021	Verona, Italy	Challenger	Clay	(Switzerland) Luca Margaroli	(France) Sadio Doumbia (France) Fabien Reboul	5–7, 6–4, [6–10]
Win	11–15	Oct 2021	Lima II, Peru	Challenger	Clay	(Peru) Sergio Galdós	(Chile) Marcelo Tomás Barrios Vera (Chile) Alejandro Tabilo	6–2, 2–6, [10–5]
Loss	11–16	Dec 2021	Maia, Portugal	Challenger	Clay (i)	(Slovakia) Andrej Martin	(Portugal) Nuno Borges (Portugal) Francisco Cabral	3–6, 4–6
Loss	11–17	Apr 2022	Aguascalientes, Mexico	Challenger	Clay	(India) Divij Sharan	(Colombia) Nicolás Barrientos (Mexico) Miguel Ángel Reyes-Varela	5–7, 3–6
Win	12–17	Sep 2022	Lisbon, Portugal	Challenger	Clay	(Czech Republic) Zdeněk Kolář	(Ukraine) Vladyslav Manafov (Ukraine) Oleg Prihodko	6–1, 7–6^{(7–4)}
