= Martin Krumich =

Czech tennis player (born 2002)

- Country (sports): Czech Republic
- Born: 26 December 2002 (age 23) Kolín, Czech Republic
- Height: 1.88 m (6 ft 2 in)
- Plays: Right-Handed, Two-Handed Backhand
- Prize money: US $182,701

Singles
- Career record: 0–1 (at ATP Tour level, Grand Slam level, and in Davis Cup)
- Career titles: 0
- Highest ranking: No. 249 (3 August 2026)
- Current ranking: No. 299 (9 November 2026)

Doubles
- Career record: 0–0 (at ATP Tour level, Grand Slam level, and in Davis Cup)
- Career titles: 0
- Highest ranking: No. 773 (6 June 2022)
- Last updated on: 9 November 2026.

Martin Krumich (born 26 December 2002) is a Czech tennis player. He reached a career high ATP singles ranking of No. 249 achieved on 3 August 2026 and a career high ATP doubles ranking of No. 773 achieved on 6 June 2022.

== Career ==
=== 2019–2022: First ITF final and title ===
At the age of 17, he reached his first finals in the ITF Men's World Tennis Tour at M15 Milovice, but lost to fellow Czech, Jan Šátral 3–6, 3–6. In May 2022, he got his maiden title by beating Jurgen Briand in the finals of M25 Prague.

=== 2023–2025: Four more ITF titles ===
Krumich claimed a second ITF title in M25 Jablonec nad Nisou, beating Mohamed Safwat in straight sets. Shortly after, he defeated Nicholas David Ionel in the finals of M25 Pazardzhik, getting his first ITF title outside of the Czech Republic. He repeated the same feat up against the same player at week later at M25 Telavi.

He attempted to qualify for the 2024 Swedish Open – Men's singles but lost in the first round of the qualifying draw to Andrea Pellegrino.

In September 2025, he won his fifth title by beating compatriot Maxim Mrva 6–2, 6–4 at M25 Pardubice.

=== 2026: ATP debut, first singles Challenger final ===
Krumich reached his first ATP Challenger Tour singles Final in the 2026 Košice Open – Singles after being Mathys Erhard in his maiden semifinal.

Krumich made his ATP main draw debut at the 2026 Swedish Open after qualifying for the singles main draw, defeating Frederico Ferreira Silva and Francesco Passaro.

== ATP Challenger and ITF World Tennis Tour finals ==
=== Singles: 12 (6–6) ===
Legend (singles) ATP Challenger Tour (0–1) ITF World Tennis Tour (6–5)	Finals by surface Hard (0–3) Clay (6–3) Grass (0–0)

Result	W–L	Date	Tournament	Tier	Surface	Opponent	Score
Loss	0–1	Nov 2019	M15 Milovice, Czech Republic	World Tennis Tour	Hard (i)	(Czech Republic) Jan Šátral	3–6, 3–6
Win	0-2	Jan 2022	M15 Doha, Qatar	World Tennis Tour	Hard	(Sweden) Dragos Nicolae Madaras	3-6, 2-6
Win	1–2	May 2022	M25 Prague, Czech Republic	World Tennis Tour	Clay	(France) Jurgen Briand	7–6(7–3), 6–0
Win	2–2	Sep 2023	M25 Jablonec nad Nisou, Czech Republic	World Tennis Tour	Clay	(Egypt) Mohamed Safwat	6–2, 6–0
Win	3-2	Oct 2023	M25 Pazardzhik, Bulgaria	World Tennis Tour	Clay	(Romania) Nicholas David Ionel	4-6, 6-0, 6-4
Win	4-2	Oct 2023	M25 Telavi, Georgia	World Tennis Tour	Clay	(Romania) Nicholas David Ionel	6-4, 6-4
Win	5–2	Oct 2023	M25 Telavi, Georgia	World Tennis Tour	Clay	(Czech Republic) Michael Vrbenský	6–3, 6–7^{(7–9)}, 6–4
Loss	5–3	Jun 2024	M25 Satu Mare, Romania	World Tennis Tour	Clay	(Romania) Cezar Cretu	2–6, 0–3
Loss	5–4	Feb 2025	M15 Sharm El Sheikh, Egypt	World Tennis Tour	Hard	(Georgia (country)) Saba Purtseladze	7–6^{(7–5)}, 6–7^{(3–7)}, 3–6
Win	6–4	Sep 2025	M25 Pardubice, Czech Republic	World Tennis Tour	Clay	(Czech Republic) Maxim Mrva	6–2, 6–4
Loss	6–5	Oct 2025	M25 Santa Margherita di Pula, Italy	World Tennis Tour	Clay	(Italy) Gianluca Cadenasso	1–6, 1–6
Loss	6–6	May 2026	Košice, Slovakia	Challenger	Clay	(Switzerland) Kilian Feldbausch	0–6, 6–4, 4–6

=== Doubles: 2 (0–2) ===
Legend (singles) ATP Challenger Tour (0–1) ITF World Tennis Tour (0–1)	Finals by surface Hard (0–0) Clay (0–2) Grass (0–0)

Result	W–L	Date	Tournament	Tier	Surface	Partner	Opponents	Score
Loss	0–1	Aug 2021	Prague Open, Czech Republic	Challenger	Clay	(Czech Republic) Andrew Paulson	(Romania) Victor Vlad Cornea (Greece) Petros Tsitsipas	3–6, 6–3, [8–10]
Loss	0–2	Sep 2024	M25 Santa Margherita di Pula, Italy	WTT	Clay	(Czech Republic) Dominik Kellovský	(Ukraine) Oleksii Krutykh (Greece) Dimitris Sakellaridis	6–2, 4–6, [6–10]
