= IBG Prague Open =

Defunct tennis tournament
- Event name: IBG Prague Open
- Location: Prague, Czech Republic
- Category: ATP Challenger Tour
- Surface: Clay

The IBG Prague Open (previously the RPM Open) was a professional tennis tournament played on clay courts. It was part of the Association of Tennis Professionals (ATP) Challenger Tour. It was held in Prague, Czech Republic in 2021, 2022 and 2023.

== Past finals ==
=== Singles ===
Year	Champion	Runner-up	Score
2020	(Russia) Aslan Karatsev	(Netherlands) Tallon Griekspoor	6–4, 7–6^{(8–6)}
2021	(Italy) Franco Agamenone	(United Kingdom) Ryan Peniston	6–3, 6–1
2022	(Ukraine) Oleksii Krutykh	(Germany) Lucas Gerch	6–3, 6–7^{(2–7)}, 6–2
2023	(Germany) Rudolf Molleker	(France) Gabriel Debru	6–2, 6–2

=== Doubles ===
Year	Champions	Runners-up	Score
2020	(Netherlands) Sander Arends (Netherlands) David Pel	(Sweden) André Göransson (Portugal) Gonçalo Oliveira	7–5, 7–6^{(7–5)}
2021	(Romania) Victor Vlad Cornea (1) (Greece) Petros Tsitsipas	(Czech Republic) Martin Krumich (Czech Republic) Andrew Paulson	6–3, 3–6, [10–8]
2022	(Romania) Victor Vlad Cornea (2) (Czech Republic) Andrew Paulson (1)	(Bulgaria) Adrian Andreev (Bolivia) Murkel Dellien	6–3, 6–1
2023	(Czech Republic) Petr Nouza (Czech Republic) Andrew Paulson (2)	(Sweden) Filip Bergevi (Netherlands) Mick Veldheer	7–5, 6–3
