= 2024 Zug Open – Doubles =

Doubles
- 2024 Zug Open

Final
- Champions: (Austria) Jurij Rodionov (Ukraine) Volodymyr Uzhylovskyi
- Runners-up: (Japan) Seita Watanabe (Japan) Takeru Yuzuki
- Score: 7–6^{(7–5)}, 7–6^{(7–5)}

Events
Singles	Doubles
← 2023 ·	Zug Open	· 2025 →

Théo Arribagé and Luca Sanchez were the defending champions but chose not to defend their title.

Jurij Rodionov and Volodymyr Uzhylovskyi won the title after defeating Seita Watanabe and Takeru Yuzuki 7–6^{(7–5)}, 7–6^{(7–5)} in the final.

== Seeds ==
1. (United States) George Goldhoff / (United Kingdom) Marcus Willis (first round)
2. (India) Jeevan Nedunchezhiyan / (India) Vijay Sundar Prashanth (quarterfinals)
3. (Japan) Toshihide Matsui / (Japan) Kaito Uesugi (first round)
4. Ivan Liutarevich / (Poland) Szymon Walków (first round)

== Draw ==
=== Key ===
- Q = Qualifier
- WC = Wild card
- LL = Lucky loser
- Alt = Alternate
- SE = Special exempt
- PR = Protected ranking
- ITF = ITF entry
- JE = Junior exempt
- w/o = Walkover
- r = Retired
- d = Defaulted
- SR = Special ranking

=== Draw ===
First round
1	(United States) G Goldhoff (United Kingdom) M Willis	6	5	[10]
(Japan) S Watanabe (Japan) T Yuzuki	2	7	[12]
(Greece) M Kalovelonis (New Zealand) R Statham	3	2
(Netherlands) D Pel (Netherlands) B Stevens	6	6
4	I Liutarevich (Poland) S Walków	5	5
(Romania) A Jecan (Austria) D Pichler	7	7
(Brazil) M Alves (Ukraine) V Orlov	6	3	[5]
WC	(Switzerland) J Kym (Switzerland) Jeffrey von der Schulenburg	2	6	[10]
WC	(Switzerland) H Bernet (Switzerland) D Stricker	6^{4}	7^{7}	[11]
(Brazil) L Britto (Israel) R Stepanov	7^{7}	6^{4}	[9]
(Austria) J Rodionov (Ukraine) V Uzhylovskyi	7^{11}	5	[10]
3	(Japan) T Matsui (Japan) K Uesugi	6^{9}	7	[2]
(Switzerland) R Bertola (Switzerland) L Margaroli	6	6^{2}	[10]
(Argentina) RA Burruchaga (Argentina) JM Cerúndolo	2	7^{7}	[5]
(Switzerland) J Paul (Switzerland) D Wenger	7^{7}	4	[5]
2	(India) J Nedunchezhiyan (India) VS Prashanth	6^{5}	6	[10]

Quarterfinals
(Japan) S Watanabe (Japan) T Yuzuki	3	6	[10]
(Netherlands) D Pel (Netherlands) B Stevens	6	1	[8]
(Romania) A Jecan (Austria) D Pichler	7^{8}	4	[8]
WC	(Switzerland) J Kym (Switzerland) J von der Schulenburg	6^{6}	6	[10]
WC	(Switzerland) H Bernet (Switzerland) D Stricker	3	3
(Austria) J Rodionov (Ukraine) V Uzhylovskyi	6	6
(Switzerland) R Bertola (Switzerland) L Margaroli	1	6	[17]
2	(India) J Nedunchezhiyan (India) VS Prashanth	6	4	[15]

Semifinals
(Japan) S Watanabe (Japan) T Yuzuki	2	6	[10]
WC	(Switzerland) J Kym (Switzerland) J von der Schulenburg	6	2	[8]
(Austria) J Rodionov (Ukraine) V Uzhylovskyi	7^{7}	7
(Switzerland) R Bertola (Switzerland) L Margaroli	6^{2}	5

Final
(Japan) S Watanabe (Japan) T Yuzuki	6^{5}	6^{5}
(Austria) J Rodionov (Ukraine) V Uzhylovskyi	7^{7}	7^{7}
