= 2025 Zug Open – Singles =

Singles
- 2025 Zug Open

Final
- Champion: (Slovakia) Lukáš Klein
- Runner-up: (France) Harold Mayot
- Score: 6–2, 6–7^{(4–7)}, 6–4

Events
Singles	Doubles
← 2024 ·	Zug Open	· 2026 →

Jérôme Kym was the defending champion but chose not to defend his title.

Lukáš Klein won the title after defeating Harold Mayot 6–2, 6–7^{(4–7)}, 6–4 in the final.

== Seeds ==
1. (Hungary) Zsombor Piros (quarterfinals)
2. (Switzerland) Marc-Andrea Hüsler (quarterfinals)
3. (France) Calvin Hemery (second round)
4. (France) Harold Mayot (final)
5. (Italy) Francesco Maestrelli (first round)
6. (Argentina) Santiago Rodríguez Taverna (first round)
7. (Argentina) Facundo Díaz Acosta (quarterfinals)
8. (Lebanon) Benjamin Hassan (first round)

== Draw ==
=== Key ===
- Q = Qualifier
- WC = Wild card
- LL = Lucky loser
- Alt = Alternate
- ITF = ITF entry
- PR = Protected ranking
- SR = Special ranking
- SE = Special exempt
- JE = Junior exempt
- JR = Junior Accelerator Programme entrant
- CO = College Accelerator Programme entrant
- NG = Next Gen Accelerator Program entrant
- w/o = Walkover
- r = Retired
- d = Defaulted

=== Finals ===
Semifinals
Q	(Greece) Stefanos Sakellaridis	3	7^{7}	3
4	(France) Harold Mayot	6	6^{3}	6
Q	(Switzerland) Jakub Paul	1	4
SE	(Slovakia) Lukáš Klein	6	6

Final
4	(France) Harold Mayot	2	7^{7}	4
SE	(Slovakia) Lukáš Klein	6	6^{4}	6

=== Top half ===
First round
1	(Hungary) Z Piros	6	6
(Switzerland) A Ritschard	3	2
(Bulgaria) D Kuzmanov	7	4	2
(Bosnia and Herzegovina) N Fatić	5	6	6
Alt	(Italy) L Giustino	6^{7}	4
Alt	(France) G Blancaneaux	7^{9}	6
Q	(Greece) S Sakellaridis	6	6
8	(Lebanon) B Hassan	4	3
4	(France) H Mayot	7	6
Q	(Czech Republic) Petr Brunclík	5	1
Q	(Switzerland) R Bertola	6	3	6^{4}
(Sweden) E Ymer	4	6	7^{7}
WC	(Switzerland) K Feldbausch	4	6^{6}
(Argentina) A Collarini	6	7^{8}
WC	(Switzerland) M Brunold	6	7
5	(Italy) F Maestrelli	4	5

Second round
1	(Hungary) Z Piros	6	6
(Bosnia and Herzegovina) N Fatić	3	4
Alt	(France) G Blancaneaux	4	3
Q	(Greece) S Sakellaridis	6	6
4	(France) H Mayot	6	6
(Sweden) E Ymer	3	1
(Argentina) A Collarini	6	1	2
WC	(Switzerland) M Brunold	3	6	6

Quarterfinals
1	(Hungary) Z Piros	7	6^{4}	4
Q	(Greece) S Sakellaridis	5	7^{7}	6
4	(France) H Mayot	6	6
WC	(Switzerland) M Brunold	3	4

Semifinals
Q	(Greece) S Sakellaridis	3	7^{7}	3
4	(France) H Mayot	6	6^{3}	6

=== Bottom half ===
First round
7	(Argentina) F Díaz Acosta	6	6
M Sharipov	4	3
(Argentina) F Mena	1	2
(Paraguay) AD Vallejo	6	6
Q	(Switzerland) J Paul	6	6
Q	(Austria) M Neuchrist	4	3
(Kazakhstan) D Yevseyev	3	3
3	(France) C Hemery	6	6
6	(Argentina) S Rodríguez Taverna	3	3
SE	(Slovakia) L Klein	6	6
WC	(Switzerland) H Bernet	6	7^{7}
(Bolivia) M Dellien	3	6^{5}
(Switzerland) D Stricker	5	4
Q	(Argentina) RA Burruchaga	7	6
(Spain) D Mérida	6^{5}	3
2	(Switzerland) M-A Hüsler	7^{7}	6

Second round
7	(Argentina) F Díaz Acosta	7^{7}	6
(Paraguay) AD Vallejo	6^{5}	2
Q	(Switzerland) J Paul	6	6
3	(France) C Hemery	3	1
SE	(Slovakia) L Klein	6	3	6
WC	(Switzerland) H Bernet	4	6	3
Q	(Argentina) RA Burruchaga	6^{6}	2
2	(Switzerland) M-A Hüsler	7^{8}	6

Quarterfinals
7	(Argentina) F Díaz Acosta	2	5
Q	(Switzerland) J Paul	6	7
SE	(Slovakia) L Klein	6	7
2	(Switzerland) M-A Hüsler	2	5

Semifinals
Q	(Switzerland) J Paul	1	4
SE	(Slovakia) L Klein	6	6
