= 2026 Zug Open – Singles =

Singles
- 2026 Zug Open

Final
- Champion: (Brazil) Thiago Seyboth Wild
- Runner-up: (Switzerland) Marc-Andrea Hüsler
- Score: 6–4, 6–3

Events
Singles	Doubles
- Zug Open

Lukáš Klein was the defending champion but chose not to defend his title.

Thiago Seyboth Wild won the title after defeating Marc-Andrea Hüsler 6–4, 6–3 in the final.

== Seeds ==
1. (Hungary) Zsombor Piros (second round)
2. (Chile) Tomás Barrios Vera (first round)
3. (Czech Republic) Zdeněk Kolář (first round)
4. (Spain) Roberto Carballés Baena (first round)
5. (Italy) Francesco Passaro (first round)
6. (Switzerland) Jérôme Kym (second round)
7. (Belgium) Kimmer Coppejans (withdrew)
8. (France) Harold Mayot (quarterfinals)

== Draw ==
Key

- Q = Qualifier
- WC = Wild card
- LL = Lucky loser
- Alt = Alternate
- ITF = ITF entry
- PR = Protected ranking
- SR = Special ranking
- SE = Special exempt
- JE = Junior exempt
- JR = Junior Accelerator Programme entrant
- CO = College Accelerator Programme entrant
- NG = Next Gen Accelerator Program entrant
- w/o = Walkover
- r = Retired
- d = Defaulted

=== Finals ===
Semifinals
Alt	(Germany) Max Hans Rehberg	6^{5}	6	4
WC	(Switzerland) Marc-Andrea Hüsler	7^{7}	4	6
(Brazil) Thiago Seyboth Wild	6	6
WC	(Switzerland) Dylan Dietrich	4	3

Final
WC	(Switzerland) Marc-Andrea Hüsler	4	3
(Brazil) Thiago Seyboth Wild	6	6

=== Top half ===
First round
1	(Hungary) Z Piros	6	3
(Italy) S Napolitano	1	2^{r}
Q	(Bulgaria) A Donski	4	3
Alt	(Germany) MH Rehberg	6	6
(Belgium) B Gadamauri	2^{r}
(Ecuador) Á Guillén Meza	5
(Romania) C Crețu	0	3
Q	(United Kingdom) A Matusevich	6	6
4	(Spain) R Carballés Baena	3	6^{6}
WC	(Switzerland) M-A Hüsler	6	7^{8}
LL	(Argentina) JB Torres	6	3	6
WC	(Switzerland) H Bernet	4	6	3
(Romania) FC Jianu	3^{r}
Q	(Slovakia) N Gombos	4
Q	(Switzerland) D Stricker	6^{5}	6	7^{7}
5	(Italy) F Passaro	7^{7}	1	6^{4}

Second round
1	(Hungary) Z Piros	3	4
Alt	(Germany) MH Rehberg	6	6
(Ecuador) Á Guillén Meza	5	4
Q	(United Kingdom) A Matusevich	7	6
WC	(Switzerland) M-A Hüsler	6	7
LL	(Argentina) JB Torres	2	5
Q	(Slovakia) N Gombos	1	3
Q	(Switzerland) D Stricker	6	6

Quarterfinals
Alt	(Germany) MH Rehberg	6^{5}	6	6
Q	(United Kingdom) A Matusevich	7^{7}	4	3
WC	(Switzerland) M-A Hüsler	6	6
Q	(Switzerland) D Stricker	3	2

Semifinals
Alt	(Germany) MH Rehberg	6^{5}	6	4
WC	(Switzerland) M-A Hüsler	7^{7}	4	6

=== Bottom half ===
First round
6	(Switzerland) J Kym	1	6	6
(United Kingdom) J Clarke	6	4	4
(South Africa) P Henning	7^{7}	6
Q	(Brazil) T Monteiro	6^{4}	3
NG	(France) T Faurel	6^{4}	6	6^{8}
(Spain) D Rincón	7^{7}	4	7^{10}
(Brazil) T Seyboth Wild	6	6
3	(Czech Republic) Z Kolář	3	2
8	(France) H Mayot	6	2	6
(Italy) R Brancaccio	4	6	1
(Spain) M Damas	1	0
Q	(Switzerland) M Brunold	6	6
(Spain) M Alcalá Gurri	6	6^{7}	6
Alt	(Czech Republic) M Krumich	3	7^{9}	2
WC	(Switzerland) D Dietrich	6	4	6
2	(Chile) T Barrios Vera	4	6	1

Second round
6	(Switzerland) J Kym	5	6	0
(South Africa) P Henning	7	4	6
(Spain) D Rincón	6^{8}	6	3
(Brazil) T Seyboth Wild	7^{10}	4	6
8	(France) H Mayot	6	6
Q	(Switzerland) M Brunold	4	3
(Spain) M Alcalá Gurri	3	3
WC	(Switzerland) D Dietrich	6	6

Quarterfinals
(South Africa) P Henning	1	6^{1}
(Brazil) T Seyboth Wild	6	7^{7}
8	(France) H Mayot	3	3
WC	(Switzerland) D Dietrich	6	6

Semifinals
(Brazil) T Seyboth Wild	6	6
WC	(Switzerland) D Dietrich	4	3
