= 2025 Zug Open =

- Date: 21 – 27 July
- Edition: 4th
- Surface: Clay
- Location: Zug, Switzerland

Champions

Singles
- (Slovakia) Lukáš Klein

Doubles
- no champions
← 2024 ·	Zug Open	· 2026 →

The 2025 Dialectic Zug Open was a professional tennis tournament played on outdoor clay courts. It was the fourth edition of the tournament and part of the 2025 ATP Challenger Tour. It took place in Zug, Switzerland between 21 and 27 July 2025.

== Singles main draw entrants ==
=== Seeds ===
Country	Player	Rank^{1}	Seed
HUN	Zsombor Piros	166	1
SUI	Marc-Andrea Hüsler	170	2
FRA	Calvin Hemery	171	3
FRA	Harold Mayot	178	4
ITA	Francesco Maestrelli	179	5
ARG	Santiago Rodríguez Taverna	188	6
ARG	Facundo Díaz Acosta	189	7
LBN	Benjamin Hassan	196	8

- ^{1} Rankings as of 14 July 2025.

=== Other entrants ===
The following players received wildcards into the singles main draw:

- (Switzerland) Henry Bernet
- (Switzerland) Mika Brunold
- (Switzerland) Kilian Feldbausch

The following player received entry into the singles main draw as a special exempt:

- (Slovakia) Lukáš Klein

The following players received entry into the singles main draw as alternates:

- (France) Geoffrey Blancaneaux
- (Italy) Lorenzo Giustino

The following players received entry from the qualifying draw:

- (Switzerland) Rémy Bertola
- (Czech Republic) Petr Brunclík
- (Argentina) Román Andrés Burruchaga
- (Austria) Maximilian Neuchrist
- (Switzerland) Jakub Paul
- (Greece) Stefanos Sakellaridis

== Champions ==
=== Singles ===
- (Slovakia) Lukáš Klein def. (France) Harold Mayot 6–2, 6–7^{(4–7)}, 6–4.

=== Doubles ===
- (France) Geoffrey Blancaneaux / (France) Harold Mayot vs. (South Korea) Nam Ji-sung / (Japan) Takeru Yuzuki, not completed.
