= 2023 Saturn Oil Open – Doubles =

Doubles
- 2023 Saturn Oil Open

Final
- Champions: (Spain) Íñigo Cervantes (Spain) Oriol Roca Batalla
- Runners-up: (France) Manuel Guinard (France) Grégoire Jacq
- Score: 6–2, 7–6^{(7–1)}

Events
Singles	Doubles
← 2022 ·	Saturn Oil Open	· 2024 →

Dustin Brown and Evan King were the defending champions but only Brown chose to defend his title, partnering Tim Sandkaulen. Brown lost in the quarterfinals to Manuel Guinard and Grégoire Jacq.

Íñigo Cervantes and Oriol Roca Batalla won the title after defeating Guinard and Jacq 6–2, 7–6^{(7–1)} in the final.

== Seeds ==
1. (Germany) Constantin Frantzen / (Germany) Hendrik Jebens (first round)
2. (Ukraine) Denys Molchanov / (Slovakia) Igor Zelenay (semifinals)
3. (Jamaica) Dustin Brown / (Germany) Tim Sandkaulen (quarterfinals)
4. (Bolivia) Boris Arias / (Brazil) Orlando Luz (quarterfinals)

== Draw ==
=== Key ===
- Q = Qualifier
- WC = Wild card
- LL = Lucky loser
- Alt = Alternate
- ITF = ITF entry
- PR = Protected ranking
- SR = Special ranking
- SE = Special exempt
- JE = Junior exempt
- JR = Junior Accelerator Programme entrant
- CO = College Accelerator Programme entrant
- NG = Next Gen Accelerator Program entrant
- w/o = Walkover
- r = Retired
- d = Defaulted

First round
1	(Germany) C Frantzen (Germany) H Jebens	4	6^{5}
(Sweden) F Bergevi (Australia) J Taylor	6	7^{7}
WC	(Syria) H Naw (Germany) John Sperle	6	2	[6]
(Netherlands) J Sels (Japan) K Uchida	4	6	[10]
4	(Bolivia) B Arias (Brazil) O Luz	6	3	[10]
(Uzbekistan) S Fayziev (Romania) A Jecan	3	6	[7]
Alt	(Lebanon) B Hassan (Germany) H Squire	3	4
(Spain) Í Cervantes (Spain) O Roca Batalla	6	6
(France) M Guinard (France) G Jacq	6	6
(Argentina) H Casanova (Argentina) R Olivo	0	3
WC	(India) R Ramanathan (Serbia) N Zimonjić	4	7^{7}	[9]
3	(Jamaica) D Brown (Germany) T Sandkaulen	6	6^{4}	[11]
(Dominican Republic) N Hardt; P Kotov	6	6
(Peru) A Merino (Germany) C Negritu	3	3
(Portugal) F Ferreira Silva (Bulgaria) D Kuzmanov	3	6	[8]
2	(Ukraine) D Molchanov (Slovakia) I Zelenay	6	4	[10]

Quarterfinals
(Sweden) F Bergevi (Australia) J Taylor	6^{4}	3
(Netherlands) J Sels (Japan) K Uchida	7^{7}	6
4	(Bolivia) B Arias (Brazil) O Luz	6^{6}	7	[5]
(Spain) Í Cervantes (Spain) O Roca Batalla	7^{8}	5	[10]
(France) M Guinard (France) G Jacq	6	6
3	(Jamaica) D Brown (Germany) T Sandkaulen	3	3
(Dominican Republic) N Hardt; P Kotov	4	5
2	(Ukraine) D Molchanov (Slovakia) I Zelenay	6	7

Semifinals
(Netherlands) J Sels (Japan) K Uchida	3	3
(Spain) Í Cervantes (Spain) O Roca Batalla	6	6
(France) M Guinard (France) G Jacq	6	5	[10]
2	(Ukraine) D Molchanov (Slovakia) I Zelenay	0	7	[6]

Final
(Spain) Í Cervantes (Spain) O Roca Batalla	6	7^{7}
(France) M Guinard (France) G Jacq	2	6^{1}
