= 2023 Saturn Oil Open – Singles =

Singles
- 2023 Saturn Oil Open

Final
- Champion: Ivan Gakhov
- Runner-up: (Portugal) Frederico Ferreira Silva
- Score: 6–2, 5–7, 6–3

Events
Singles	Doubles
← 2022 ·	Saturn Oil Open	· 2024 →

Lukáš Klein was the defending champion but lost in the second round to Ivan Gakhov.

Gakhov won the title after defeating Frederico Ferreira Silva 6–2, 5–7, 6–3 in the final.

== Seeds ==
1. Pavel Kotov (semifinals)
2. (Hungary) Zsombor Piros (first round)
3. (Belgium) Zizou Bergs (withdrew)
4. (Slovakia) Lukáš Klein (second round)
5. (Austria) Filip Misolic (first round)
6. (Slovakia) Jozef Kovalík (first round)
7. (Japan) Kaichi Uchida (first round)
8. (Netherlands) Jelle Sels (first round)

== Draw ==
=== Key ===
- Q = Qualifier
- WC = Wild card
- LL = Lucky loser
- Alt = Alternate
- SE = Special exempt
- PR = Protected ranking
- ITF = ITF entry
- JE = Junior exempt
- w/o = Walkover
- r = Retired
- d = Defaulted
- SR = Special ranking

=== Finals ===
Semifinals
1	Pavel Kotov	7^{7}	1	1
Ivan Gakhov	6^{5}	6	6
LL	(India) Sumit Nagal	2	6	4
(Portugal) Frederico Ferreira Silva	6	3	6

Final
Ivan Gakhov	6	5	6
(Portugal) Frederico Ferreira Silva	2	7	3

=== Top half ===
First round
1	P Kotov	3	7^{7}	6
(Belgium) J De Loore	6	6^{5}	1
Q	(France) T Atmane	6	7^{7}
(Chinese Taipei) Y-h Hsu	1	6^{3}
Alt	(Argentina) H Casanova	6	6
LL	(France) C Bittoun Kouzmine	2	4
Q	(Latvia) R Strombachs	7	7^{7}
6	(Slovakia) J Kovalík	5	6^{5}
4	(Slovakia) L Klein	6	6^{2}	6
WC	(Germany) M Topo	3	7^{7}	4
I Gakhov	6	6
Q	(Spain) O Roca Batalla	2	0
Q	(Dominican Republic) N Hardt	4	7^{7}	6
(Chinese Taipei) C-h Tseng	6	6^{2}	2
WC	(Germany) M Moraing	6	6
8	(Netherlands) J Sels	2	3

Second round
1	P Kotov	6	6
Q	(France) T Atmane	2	2
Alt	(Argentina) H Casanova	4	0
Q	(Latvia) R Strombachs	6	6
4	(Slovakia) L Klein	4	2
I Gakhov	6	6
Q	(Dominican Republic) N Hardt	6	1	7^{7}
WC	(Germany) M Moraing	2	6	6^{4}

Quarterfinals
1	P Kotov	2	6	6
Q	(Latvia) R Strombachs	6	3	4
I Gakhov	3	7^{7}	7^{7}
Q	(Dominican Republic) N Hardt	6	6^{3}	6^{4}

Semifinals
1	P Kotov	7^{7}	1	1
I Gakhov	6^{5}	6	6

=== Bottom half ===
First round
5	(Austria) F Misolic	5	6	4
LL	(Sweden) K Friberg	7	4	6
(Turkey) A Çelikbilek	0	4
(Ukraine) O Krutykh	6	6
(Bulgaria) D Kuzmanov	3	6	5
LL	(India) S Nagal	6	1	7
(United Kingdom) J Choinski	6	6
Q	(Brazil) J Pereira	4	3
7	(Japan) K Uchida	3	3
Q	(Lebanon) B Hassan	6	6
(Portugal) F Ferreira Silva	6	3	6
Alt	(Switzerland) H Laaksonen	3	6	1
WC	(Germany) H Squire	2	5
LL	(Argentina) R Olivo	6	7
(South Korea) S-c Hong	3	6	6
2	(Hungary) Z Piros	6	0	0

Second round
LL	(Sweden) K Friberg	6	1	4
(Ukraine) O Krutykh	1	6	6
LL	(India) S Nagal	w/o
(United Kingdom) J Choinski
Q	(Lebanon) B Hassan	3	6	2
(Portugal) F Ferreira Silva	6	3	6
LL	(Argentina) R Olivo	6	3	6
(South Korea) S-c Hong	3	6	4

Quarterfinals
(Ukraine) O Krutykh	1	6	4
LL	(India) S Nagal	6	1	6
(Portugal) F Ferreira Silva	6	6
LL	(Argentina) R Olivo	3	2

Semifinals
LL	(India) S Nagal	2	6	4
(Portugal) F Ferreira Silva	6	3	6
