= 2025 Zug Open – Doubles =

Doubles
- 2025 Zug Open

Events
| Singles | Doubles |
- Zug Open

Jurij Rodionov and Volodymyr Uzhylovskyi were the defending champions but chose not to defend their title.

The final between Geoffrey Blancaneaux and Harold Mayot and Nam Ji-sung and Takeru Yuzuki was not completed due to poor weather.

== Seeds ==
1. (India) Arjun Kadhe / (India) Vijay Sundar Prashanth (quarterfinals)
2. (Ukraine) Denys Molchanov / (Spain) David Vega Hernández (first round)
3. (Romania) Victor Vlad Cornea / (Spain) Sergio Martos Gornés (first round)
4. (Brazil) Luís Britto / (Brazil) Marcelo Zormann (first round)

== Draw ==
Key

- Q = Qualifier
- WC = Wild card
- LL = Lucky loser
- Alt = Alternate
- ITF = ITF entry
- PR = Protected ranking
- SR = Special ranking
- SE = Special exempt
- JE = Junior exempt
- JR = Junior Accelerator Programme entrant
- CO = College Accelerator Programme entrant
- NG = Next Gen Accelerator Program entrant
- w/o = Walkover
- r = Retired
- d = Defaulted

=== Draw ===
First round
1 | (India) A Kadhe (India) VS Prashanth | 6 | 6
(Czech Republic) Jiří Barnat (Czech Republic) F Duda | 1 | 4
(Poland) S Kielan (Poland) F Pieczonka | 6 | 6
WC | (Switzerland) K Feldbausch (Switzerland) Jeffrey von der Schulenburg | 0 | 3
4 | (Brazil) L Britto (Brazil) M Zormann | 4 | 4
(France) G Blancaneaux (France) H Mayot | 6 | 6
(Czech Republic) A Paulson (Czech Republic) M Vrbenský | 6 | 7^{7}
(New Zealand) F Reynolds (New Zealand) J Watt | 4 | 6^{3}
(South Korea) J-s Nam (Japan) T Yuzuki | 6 | 6
WC | (Switzerland) H Bernet (Switzerland) D Stricker | 4 | 4
(India) S Banthia (Bulgaria) A Donski | 6^{1} | 6 | [10]
3 | (Romania) V Cornea (Spain) S Martos Gornés | 7^{7} | 2 | [5]
(Venezuela) LD Martínez (Argentina) F Mena | 6^{8} | 6 | [10]
(Israel) D Cukierman (Argentina) M Kestelboim | 7^{10} | 1 | [6]
(Slovakia) L Pokorný (Italy) G Ricca | 7 | 4 | [10]
2 | (Ukraine) D Molchanov (Spain) D Vega Hernández | 5 | 6 | [3]

Quarterfinals
1 | (India) A Kadhe (India) VS Prashanth | 3 | 4
(Poland) S Kielan (Poland) F Pieczonka | 6 | 6
(France) G Blancaneaux (France) H Mayot | 3 | 6 | [10]
(Czech Republic) A Paulson (Czech Republic) M Vrbenský | 6 | 3 | [4]
(South Korea) J-s Nam (Japan) T Yuzuki | 6 | 6
(India) S Banthia (Bulgaria) A Donski | 4 | 2
(Venezuela) LD Martínez (Argentina) F Mena | 3 | 2
(Slovakia) L Pokorný (Italy) G Ricca | 6 | 6

Semifinals
(Poland) S Kielan (Poland) F Pieczonka | 6^{6} | 6 | [3]
(France) G Blancaneaux (France) H Mayot | 7^{8} | 4 | [10]
(South Korea) J-s Nam (Japan) T Yuzuki | 6 | 6
(Slovakia) L Pokorný (Italy) G Ricca | 4 | 4

Final
(France) G Blancaneaux (France) H Mayot | 4 | 2
(South Korea) J-s Nam (Japan) T Yuzuki | 6 | 1
