= 2023 Zug Open – Singles =

Singles
- 2023 Zug Open

Final
- Champion: (France) Arthur Rinderknech
- Runner-up: (Belgium) Joris De Loore
- Score: 3–6, 6–3, 6–4

Events
Singles	Doubles
- Zug Open

Dominic Stricker was the defending champion but lost in the first round to Joris De Loore.

Arthur Rinderknech won the title after defeating De Loore 3–6, 6–3, 6–4 in the final.

== Seeds ==
1. (France) Arthur Rinderknech (champion)
2. (Switzerland) Dominic Stricker (first round)
3. (Austria) Jurij Rodionov (semifinals)
4. (Italy) Fabio Fognini (semifinals)
5. (Finland) Otto Virtanen (second round)
6. (France) Harold Mayot (second round)
7. (Switzerland) Alexander Ritschard (second round)
8. (Bulgaria) Dimitar Kuzmanov (second round)

== Draw ==
Key

- Q = Qualifier
- WC = Wild card
- LL = Lucky loser
- Alt = Alternate
- ITF = ITF entry
- PR = Protected ranking
- SR = Special ranking
- SE = Special exempt
- JE = Junior exempt
- JR = Junior Accelerator Programme entrant
- CO = College Accelerator Programme entrant
- NG = Next Gen Accelerator Program entrant
- w/o = Walkover
- r = Retired
- d = Defaulted

=== Finals ===
Semifinals
1	(France) Arthur Rinderknech	4	7	6
3	(Austria) Jurij Rodionov	6	5	2
4	(Italy) Fabio Fognini	6^{3}	1
(Belgium) Joris De Loore	7^{7}	6

Final
1	(France) Arthur Rinderknech	3	6	6
(Belgium) Joris De Loore	6	3	4

=== Top half ===
First round
1	(France) A Rinderknech	7^{7}	6
Q	(Italy) G Ferrari	6^{3}	3
WC	(Switzerland) M Brunold	3	2
(Italy) S Travaglia	6	6
Alt	(Brazil) M Pucinelli de Almeida	2	4
(Bulgaria) A Andreev	6	6
(Portugal) F Ferreira Silva	6	4	2
6	(France) H Mayot	4	6	6
3	(Austria) J Rodionov	6	7
(Serbia) H Medjedovic	3	5
Q	(Switzerland) R Bertola	2	3
(Sweden) DN Mădăraș	6	6
(Austria) M Neuchrist	4	4
(Belgium) Z Bergs	6	6
Q	(Turkey) E Kırkın	6^{3}	4
5	(Finland) O Virtanen	7^{7}	6

Second round
1	(France) A Rinderknech	4	6	6
(Italy) S Travaglia	6	4	3
(Bulgaria) A Andreev	7^{7}	1	6
6	(France) H Mayot	6^{5}	6	4
3	(Austria) J Rodionov	6	6
(Sweden) DN Mădăraș	2	4
(Belgium) Z Bergs	2	7^{9}	6
5	(Finland) O Virtanen	6	6^{7}	3

Quarterfinals
1	(France) A Rinderknech	6	6
(Bulgaria) A Andreev	2	2
3	(Austria) J Rodionov	6	7
(Belgium) Z Bergs	3	5

Semifinals
1	(France) A Rinderknech	4	7	6
3	(Austria) J Rodionov	6	5	2

=== Bottom half ===
First round
7	(Switzerland) A Ritschard	6	6
Q	(Germany) T Handel	2	1
(Czech Republic) J Menšík	6	6
(Argentina) S Rodríguez Taverna	4	3
Alt	(Tunisia) A Dougaz	6	6
(Netherlands) J Sels	3	4
WC	(Switzerland) K Feldbausch	4	2
4	(Italy) F Fognini	6	6
8	(Bulgaria) D Kuzmanov	6	6
Q	(Switzerland) D Dietrich	2	1
(Czech Republic) D Svrčina	1	7^{7}	3
WC	(Italy) M Gigante	6	6^{2}	6
Q	(France) M Guinard	3	7	6^{6}
(France) G Blancaneaux	6	5	7^{8}
(Belgium) J De Loore	4	7	6
2	(Switzerland) D Stricker	6	5	3

Second round
7	(Switzerland) A Ritschard	4	4
(Czech Republic) J Menšík	6	6
Alt	(Tunisia) A Dougaz	6	6^{5}	0
4	(Italy) F Fognini	1	7^{7}	6
8	(Bulgaria) D Kuzmanov	4	6^{5}
WC	(Italy) M Gigante	6	7^{7}
(France) G Blancaneaux	6^{5}	7^{7}	3
(Belgium) J De Loore	7^{7}	6^{4}	6

Quarterfinals
(Czech Republic) J Menšík	4	2
4	(Italy) F Fognini	6	6
WC	(Italy) M Gigante	6	6^{5}	4
(Belgium) J De Loore	3	7^{7}	6

Semifinals
4	(Italy) F Fognini	6^{3}	1
(Belgium) J De Loore	7^{7}	6
