= 2026 Busan Open =

- Date: 13–19 April
- Edition: 23rd
- Surface: Hard
- Location: Busan, South Korea

Champions

Singles
- (Switzerland) Leandro Riedi

Doubles
- (India) Anirudh Chandrasekar / (Japan) Takeru Yuzuki
- Busan Open

The 2026 Busan Open was a professional tennis tournament played on hardcourts. It was the 23rd edition of the tournament which was part of the 2026 ATP Challenger Tour. It took place in Busan, South Korea between 13 and 19 April 2026.

== Singles main-draw entrants ==
=== Seeds ===
Country	Player	Rank^{1}	Seed
~~AUS~~	~~James Duckworth~~	~~86~~	~~1~~
AUS	Adam Walton	111	2
JPN	Sho Shimabukuro	112	3
HKG	Coleman Wong	125	4
AUS	Dane Sweeny	135	5
AUS	Alex Bolt	154	6
CHN	Bu Yunchaokete	159	7
SUI	Leandro Riedi	168	8

* ^{1} Rankings as of 6 April 2026.

=== Other entrants ===
The following players received wildcards into the singles main draw:

- (South Korea) Chung Yun-seong
- (South Korea) Kwon Soon-woo
- (South Korea) Park Ui-sung

The following player received entry into the singles main draw using a protected ranking:

- Ilya Ivashka

The following players received entry from the qualifying draw:

- (Japan) Taro Daniel
- (Australia) Jake Delaney
- (Thailand) Kasidit Samrej
- Marat Sharipov
- (Japan) Renta Tokuda
- (Chinese Taipei) Wu Tung-lin

The following player received entry as a lucky loser:

- (Japan) James Trotter

== Champions ==
=== Singles ===
- (Switzerland) Leandro Riedi def. (China) Bu Yunchaokete 3–6, 6–3, 6–2.

=== Doubles ===
- (India) Anirudh Chandrasekar / (Japan) Takeru Yuzuki def. (Netherlands) Jean-Julien Rojer / (United States) Theodore Winegar 4–6, 6–3, [10–7].
