= 2023 Zug Open – Doubles =

Doubles
- 2023 Zug Open

Final
- Champions: (France) Théo Arribagé (France) Luca Sanchez
- Runners-up: (Turkey) Ergi Kırkın (Czech Republic) Dalibor Svrčina
- Score: 6–3, 7–5

Events
Singles	Doubles
- Zug Open

Zdeněk Kolář and Adam Pavlásek were the defending champions but chose not to defend their title.

Théo Arribagé and Luca Sanchez won the title after defeating Ergi Kırkın and Dalibor Svrčina 6–3, 7–5 in the final.

== Seeds ==
1. Ivan Liutarevich / (Ukraine) Vladyslav Manafov (quarterfinals)
2. (France) Théo Arribagé / (France) Luca Sanchez (champions)
3. (Spain) Íñigo Cervantes / (Spain) Sergio Martos Gornés (first round)
4. (France) Manuel Guinard / (France) Grégoire Jacq (first round)

== Draw ==
Key

- Q = Qualifier
- WC = Wild card
- LL = Lucky loser
- Alt = Alternate
- ITF = ITF entry
- PR = Protected ranking
- SR = Special ranking
- SE = Special exempt
- JE = Junior exempt
- JR = Junior Accelerator Programme entrant
- CO = College Accelerator Programme entrant
- NG = Next Gen Accelerator Program entrant
- w/o = Walkover
- r = Retired
- d = Defaulted

First round
1	I Liutarevich (Ukraine) V Manafov	6	6
WC	(Switzerland) D Dietrich (Switzerland) Nicolas Kobelt	4	3
WC	(Switzerland) Yannik Steinegger (Switzerland) D Wenger	2	6^{8}
(Ukraine) V Orlov (Brazil) JL Reis da Silva	6	7^{10}
3	(Spain) Í Cervantes (Spain) S Martos Gornés	3	4
(France) G Blancaneaux (Netherlands) J Sels	6	6
(Sweden) DN Mădăraș (Australia) A Taylor	6	2	[10]
(Turkey) E Kırkın (Czech Republic) D Svrčina	1	6	[12]
(Sweden) F Bergevi (Netherlands) M Veldheer	6	7^{7}
(Belgium) Z Bergs (Belgium) J De Loore	3	6^{1}
(Czech Republic) P Nouza (Czech Republic) M Vrbenský	7	2	[10]
4	(France) M Guinard (France) G Jacq	5	6	[7]
(Bulgaria) A Andreev (Ukraine) V Uzhylovskyi	3	4
(Switzerland) L Margaroli (Austria) M Neuchrist	6	6
Alt	(Brazil) M Pucinelli de Almeida (Brazil) P Sakamoto
2	(France) T Arribagé (France) L Sanchez	w/o

Quarterfinals
1	I Liutarevich (Ukraine) V Manafov	4	6	[4]
(Ukraine) V Orlov (Brazil) JL Reis da Silva	6	3	[10]
(France) G Blancaneaux (Netherlands) J Sels	4	3
(Turkey) E Kırkın (Czech Republic) D Svrčina	6	6
(Sweden) F Bergevi (Netherlands) M Veldheer	2	4
(Czech Republic) P Nouza (Czech Republic) M Vrbenský	6	6
(Switzerland) L Margaroli (Austria) M Neuchrist	5	6^{3}
2	(France) T Arribagé (France) L Sanchez	7	7^{7}

Semifinals
(Ukraine) V Orlov (Brazil) JL Reis da Silva	4	5
(Turkey) E Kırkın (Czech Republic) D Svrčina	6	7
(Czech Republic) P Nouza (Czech Republic) M Vrbenský	6	3	[8]
2	(France) T Arribagé (France) L Sanchez	2	6	[10]

Final
(Turkey) E Kırkın (Czech Republic) D Svrčina	3	5
2	(France) T Arribagé (France) L Sanchez	6	7
