= 2023 Sparkassen ATP Challenger – Doubles =

Doubles
- 2023 Sparkassen ATP Challenger

Final
- Champions: (Czech Republic) Andrew Paulson (Czech Republic) Patrik Rikl
- Runners-up: (Austria) Maximilian Neuchrist (Switzerland) Jakub Paul
- Score: 4–6, 7–6^{(9–7)}, [11–9]

Events
Singles	Doubles
- Sparkassen ATP Challenger

Denis Istomin and Evgeny Karlovskiy were the defending champions but withdrew from their quarterfinals match against Daniel Cukierman and Joshua Paris.

Andrew Paulson and Patrik Rikl won the title after defeating Maximilian Neuchrist and Jakub Paul 4–6, 7–6^{(9–7)}, [11–9] in the final.

== Seeds ==
1. (Sweden) Filip Bergevi / (Netherlands) Mick Veldheer (semifinals)
2. (Israel) Daniel Cukierman / (United Kingdom) Joshua Paris (semifinals)
3. (Romania) Alexandru Jecan / (Ukraine) Volodymyr Uzhylovskyi (first round)
4. (Austria) Maximilian Neuchrist / (Switzerland) Jakub Paul (final)

== Draw ==
Key

- Q = Qualifier
- WC = Wild card
- LL = Lucky loser
- Alt = Alternate
- ITF = ITF entry
- PR = Protected ranking
- SR = Special ranking
- SE = Special exempt
- JE = Junior exempt
- JR = Junior Accelerator Programme entrant
- CO = College Accelerator Programme entrant
- NG = Next Gen Accelerator Program entrant
- w/o = Walkover
- r = Retired
- d = Defaulted

First round
1	(Sweden) F Bergevi (Netherlands) M Veldheer	6	7^{7}
(Belgium) M Geerts (Italy) S Napolitano	3	6^{3}
(Netherlands) M Hermans (Netherlands) Ryan Nijboer	6	2	[2]
WC	(Italy) A Arnaboldi (Italy) F Arnaboldi	4	6	[10]
3	(Romania) A Jecan (Ukraine) V Uzhylovskyi	4	2
(Czech Republic) A Paulson (Czech Republic) P Rikl	6	6
(Italy) G Ricca (Italy) Augusto Virgili	7	6
(United Kingdom) B Harris (Canada) K Stevenson	5	4
(Poland) M Kaśnikowski (Italy) L Rottoli	6^{7}	3
(Morocco) E Benchetrit (Germany) L Wessels	7^{9}	6
WC	(Italy) Peter Buldorini (Italy) Lorenzo Carboni	4	0
4	(Austria) M Neuchrist (Switzerland) J Paul	6	6
(Uzbekistan) D Istomin; E Karlovskiy	6	0	[10]
(Poland) S Walków (Poland) K Żuk	4	6	[5]
(Spain) D Jordà Sanchis (Spain) A Moro Cañas	4	5
2	(Israel) D Cukierman (United Kingdom) J Paris	6	7

Quarterfinals
1	(Sweden) F Bergevi (Netherlands) M Veldheer	6	6^{4}	[10]
WC	(Italy) A Arnaboldi (Italy) F Arnaboldi	1	7^{7}	[5]
(Czech Republic) A Paulson (Czech Republic) P Rikl	6	6
(Italy) G Ricca (Italy) A Virgili	1	3
(Morocco) E Benchetrit (Germany) L Wessels	4	6^{1}
4	(Austria) M Neuchrist (Switzerland) J Paul	6	7^{7}
(Uzbekistan) D Istomin; E Karlovskiy
2	(Israel) D Cukierman (United Kingdom) J Paris	w/o

Semifinals
1	(Sweden) F Bergevi (Netherlands) M Veldheer	2	6^{2}
(Czech Republic) A Paulson (Czech Republic) P Rikl	6	7^{7}
4	(Austria) M Neuchrist (Switzerland) J Paul	6	6
2	(Israel) D Cukierman (United Kingdom) J Paris	4	1

Final
(Czech Republic) A Paulson (Czech Republic) P Rikl	4	7^{9}	[11]
4	(Austria) M Neuchrist (Switzerland) J Paul	6	6^{7}	[9]
