= 2022 Zug Open – Singles =

Singles
- 2022 Zug Open

Final
- Champion: (Switzerland) Dominic Stricker
- Runner-up: (Latvia) Ernests Gulbis
- Score: 5–7, 6–1, 6–3

Events
Singles	Doubles
- Zug Open

This was the first edition of the tournament.

Dominic Stricker won the title after defeating Ernests Gulbis 5–7, 6–1, 6–3 in the final.

== Seeds ==
1. (Switzerland) Marc-Andrea Hüsler (quarterfinals)
2. (Argentina) Juan Manuel Cerúndolo (withdrew)
3. (Germany) Jan-Lennard Struff (second round)
4. (Argentina) Facundo Mena (first round)
5. (Czech Republic) Zdeněk Kolář (first round)
6. (Italy) Gianluca Mager (first round)
7. (Germany) Mats Moraing (first round)
8. (Brazil) Felipe Meligeni Alves (first round)

== Draw ==
Key

- Q = Qualifier
- WC = Wild card
- LL = Lucky loser
- Alt = Alternate
- ITF = ITF entry
- PR = Protected ranking
- SR = Special ranking
- SE = Special exempt
- JE = Junior exempt
- JR = Junior Accelerator Programme entrant
- CO = College Accelerator Programme entrant
- NG = Next Gen Accelerator Program entrant
- w/o = Walkover
- r = Retired
- d = Defaulted

=== Finals ===
Semifinals
(France) Geoffrey Blancaneaux	4	1
(Switzerland) Dominic Stricker	6	6
(Bulgaria) Dimitar Kuzmanov	4	1
Q	(Latvia) Ernests Gulbis	6	6

Final
(Switzerland) Dominic Stricker	5	6	6
Q	(Latvia) Ernests Gulbis	7	1	3

=== Top half ===
First round
1	(Switzerland) M-A Hüsler	2	7^{7}	6
(Germany) C-M Stebe	6	6^{4}	4
(Argentina) S Rodríguez Taverna	6	6
(Bosnia and Herzegovina) D Džumhur	2	2
(Italy) A Arnaboldi	6	6
WC	(Switzerland) J Kym	4	4
(France) G Blancaneaux	3	7	6
8	(Brazil) F Meligeni Alves	6	5	3
4	(Argentina) F Mena	6	2	3
(Argentina) TA Tirante	4	6	6
(Switzerland) A Ritschard	6	5	6
WC	(Switzerland) K Feldbausch	0	7	2
(Slovakia) J Kovalík	7	2	4
(Switzerland) D Stricker	5	6	6
SE	(France) H Mayot	6	7^{7}
7	(Germany) M Moraing	3	6^{4}

Second round
1	(Switzerland) M-A Hüsler	7	6
(Argentina) S Rodríguez Taverna	5	1
(Italy) A Arnaboldi	3	4
(France) G Blancaneaux	6	6
(Argentina) TA Tirante	6^{6}	4
(Switzerland) A Ritschard	7^{8}	6
(Switzerland) D Stricker	6	4
SE	(France) H Mayot	3	5^{r}

Quarterfinals
1	(Switzerland) M-A Hüsler	6^{11}	7^{7}	3
(France) G Blancaneaux	7^{13}	6^{5}	6
(Switzerland) A Ritschard	4	3
(Switzerland) D Stricker	6	6

Semifinals
(France) G Blancaneaux	4	1
(Switzerland) D Stricker	6	6

=== Bottom half ===
First round
5	(Czech Republic) Z Kolář	4	4
LL	(Finland) O Virtanen	6	6
WC	(Switzerland) J Nikles	4	4
(Bulgaria) D Kuzmanov	6	6
Q	(Italy) L Giustino	6	4	7
Q	(Austria) M Neuchrist	2	6	5
Q	(Belgium) K Coppejans	2	6	3
3	(Germany) J-L Struff	6	3	6
6	(Italy) G Mager	7^{7}	4	2
Q	(Latvia) E Gulbis	6^{4}	6	6
(Italy) T Fabbiano	6	3	2
Q	(France) U Blanchet	4	6	6
(Germany) M Marterer	7^{7}	6
Q	(Norway) V Durasovic	6^{5}	4
(Austria) D Novak	6	6
LL	(Israel) Y Oliel	4	4

Second round
LL	(Finland) O Virtanen	1	7^{7}	6^{6}
(Bulgaria) D Kuzmanov	6	6^{2}	7^{8}
Q	(Italy) L Giustino	6	7^{7}
3	(Germany) J-L Struff	4	6^{5}
Q	(Latvia) E Gulbis	6	7^{7}
Q	(France) U Blanchet	4	6^{4}
(Germany) M Marterer	2	4
(Austria) D Novak	6	6

Quarterfinals
(Bulgaria) D Kuzmanov	6	6
Q	(Italy) L Giustino	4	4
Q	(Latvia) E Gulbis	6	7^{7}
(Austria) D Novak	1	6^{2}

Semifinals
(Bulgaria) D Kuzmanov	4	1
Q	(Latvia) E Gulbis	6	6
