= 2026 Zug Open – Doubles =

Doubles
- 2026 Zug Open

Final
- Champions: (Netherlands) Thijmen Loof (Japan) Kaito Uesugi
- Runners-up: (Czech Republic) Andrew Paulson (Czech Republic) David Poljak
- Score: 6–4, 6–2

Events
Singles	Doubles
- Zug Open

There were no defending champions as the previous edition's doubles final was canceled due to poor weather.

Thijmen Loof and Kaito Uesugi won the title after defeating Andrew Paulson and David Poljak 6–4, 6–2 in the final.

== Seeds ==
1. (United Kingdom) Joshua Paris / (Poland) Filip Pieczonka (semifinals)
2. (India) Siddhant Banthia / (Bulgaria) Alexander Donski (quarterfinals)
3. (Germany) Tim Rühl / (Netherlands) Mick Veldheer (first round)
4. (Czech Republic) Filip Duda / (Serbia) Stefan Latinović (first round)

== Draw ==
Key

- Q = Qualifier
- WC = Wild card
- LL = Lucky loser
- Alt = Alternate
- ITF = ITF entry
- PR = Protected ranking
- SR = Special ranking
- SE = Special exempt
- JE = Junior exempt
- JR = Junior Accelerator Programme entrant
- CO = College Accelerator Programme entrant
- NG = Next Gen Accelerator Program entrant
- w/o = Walkover
- r = Retired
- d = Defaulted

First round
1	(United Kingdom) J Paris (Poland) F Pieczonka	6	3	[12]
(Spain) M Alcalá Gurri (Italy) R Brancaccio	4	6	[10]
(Spain) S Martos Gornés (Poland) S Walków	3	6	[14]
(Romania) A Jecan (Romania) B Pavel	6	4	[12]
3	(Germany) T Rühl (Netherlands) M Veldheer	3	4
(Czech Republic) A Paulson (Czech Republic) D Poljak	6	6
(India) VS Prashanth (India) R Ramanathan	5	2
WC	(Switzerland) D Dietrich (Switzerland) M-A Hüsler	7	6
(Peru) A Merino (Italy) G Ricca	4	1
(Netherlands) T Loof (Japan) K Uesugi	6	6
(India) A Kadhe (Brazil) M Zormann	6	6
4	(Czech Republic) F Duda (Serbia) S Latinović	2	2
(Spain) Í Cervantes (Ukraine) D Molchanov	1	2
(Romania) V Cornea (Israel) D Cukierman	6	6
WC	(Switzerland) M Brunold (Switzerland) Patrick Schön	6	4	[8]
2	(India) S Banthia (Bulgaria) A Donski	4	6	[10]

Quarterfinals
1	(United Kingdom) J Paris (Poland) F Pieczonka	6	6
(Spain) S Martos Gornés (Poland) S Walków	4	3
(Czech Republic) A Paulson (Czech Republic) D Poljak	w/o
WC	(Switzerland) D Dietrich (Switzerland) M-A Hüsler
(Netherlands) T Loof (Japan) K Uesugi	6	6
(India) A Kadhe (Brazil) M Zormann	4	4
(Romania) V Cornea (Israel) D Cukierman	7	6
2	(India) S Banthia (Bulgaria) A Donski	5	4

Semifinals
1	(United Kingdom) J Paris (Poland) F Pieczonka	6^{3}	4
(Czech Republic) A Paulson (Czech Republic) D Poljak	7^{7}	6
(Netherlands) T Loof (Japan) K Uesugi	6	6
(Romania) V Cornea (Israel) D Cukierman	4	2

Final
(Czech Republic) A Paulson (Czech Republic) D Poljak	4	2
(Netherlands) T Loof (Japan) K Uesugi	6	6
