= 2023 Saturn Oil Open =

- Date: 29 May – 4 June
- Edition: 2nd
- Surface: Clay
- Location: Troisdorf, Germany

Champions

Singles
- Ivan Gakhov

Doubles
- (Spain) Íñigo Cervantes / (Spain) Oriol Roca Batalla
← 2022 ·	Saturn Oil Open	· 2024 →

The 2023 Saturn Oil Open was a professional tennis tournament that was played on clay courts. It was the second edition of the tournament which was part of the 2023 ATP Challenger Tour. It took place in Troisdorf, Germany between 29 May and 4 June 2023.

== Singles main-draw entrants ==
=== Seeds ===
Country	Player	Rank^{1}	Seed
	Pavel Kotov	121	1
HUN	Zsombor Piros	125	2
~~BEL~~	~~Zizou Bergs~~	~~131~~	~~3~~
SVK	Lukáš Klein	133	4
AUT	Filip Misolic	142	5
SVK	Jozef Kovalík	143	6
JPN	Kaichi Uchida	154	7
NED	Jelle Sels	169	8

- ^{1} Rankings are as of 22 May 2023.

=== Other entrants ===
The following players received wildcards into the singles main draw:

- (Germany) Mats Moraing
- (Germany) Henri Squire
- (Germany) Marko Topo

The following players received entry into the singles main draw as alternates:

- (Argentina) Hernán Casanova
- (Switzerland) Henri Laaksonen

The following players received entry from the qualifying draw:

- (France) Térence Atmane
- (Dominican Republic) Nick Hardt
- (Lebanon) Benjamin Hassan
- (Brazil) José Pereira
- (Spain) Oriol Roca Batalla
- (Latvia) Robert Strombachs

The following players received entry as lucky losers:

- (France) Constantin Bittoun Kouzmine
- (Sweden) Karl Friberg
- (India) Sumit Nagal
- (Argentina) Renzo Olivo

== Champions ==
=== Singles ===
- Ivan Gakhov def. (Portugal) Frederico Ferreira Silva 6–2, 5–7, 6–3.

=== Doubles ===
- (Spain) Íñigo Cervantes / (Spain) Oriol Roca Batalla def. (France) Manuel Guinard / (France) Grégoire Jacq 6–2, 7–6^{(7–1)}.
