= 2022 Zug Open – Doubles =

Doubles
- 2022 Zug Open

Final
- Champions: (Czech Republic) Zdeněk Kolář (Czech Republic) Adam Pavlásek
- Runners-up: (Poland) Karol Drzewiecki (Finland) Patrik Niklas-Salminen
- Score: 6–3, 7–5

Events
Singles	Doubles
- Zug Open

This was the first edition of the tournament.

Zdeněk Kolář and Adam Pavlásek won the title after defeating Karol Drzewiecki and Patrik Niklas-Salminen 6–3, 7–5 in the final.

== Seeds ==
1. (Ecuador) Diego Hidalgo / (Colombia) Cristian Rodríguez (quarterfinals)
2. (Monaco) Romain Arneodo / (France) Jonathan Eysseric (first round)
3. (New Zealand) Artem Sitak / (Netherlands) Sem Verbeek (semifinals)
4. (India) Sriram Balaji / (India) Jeevan Nedunchezhiyan (first round)

== Draw ==
Key

- Q = Qualifier
- WC = Wild card
- LL = Lucky loser
- Alt = Alternate
- ITF = ITF entry
- PR = Protected ranking
- SR = Special ranking
- SE = Special exempt
- JE = Junior exempt
- JR = Junior Accelerator Programme entrant
- CO = College Accelerator Programme entrant
- NG = Next Gen Accelerator Program entrant
- w/o = Walkover
- r = Retired
- d = Defaulted

First round
1	(Ecuador) D Hidalgo (Colombia) C Rodríguez	6^{4}	6	[10]
(Italy) T Fabbiano (Germany) C-M Stebe	7^{7}	3	[8]
WC	(Switzerland) J Paul (Switzerland) D Wenger	6	7^{7}
(Argentina) G Andreozzi (Argentina) G Durán	3	6^{3}
4	(India) S Balaji (India) J Nedunchezhiyan	2	2
(Germany) M Marterer (Germany) M Moraing	6	6
(Poland) K Drzewiecki (Finland) P Niklas-Salminen	6	7^{7}
(Austria) D Novak (Germany) J-L Struff	3	6^{5}
(Italy) M Bortolotti (Spain) S Martos Gornés	6	6
(Uruguay) M Cuevas (Venezuela) LD Martínez	4	3
WC	(France) G Blancaneaux (Israel) D Cukierman	6	4	[9]
3	(New Zealand) A Sitak (Netherlands) S Verbeek	2	6	[11]
(Czech Republic) Z Kolář (Czech Republic) A Pavlásek	6	6
(Germany) F Fallert (Germany) H Jebens	3	4
(Austria) M Neuchrist (Austria) T-S Weissborn	6	7^{8}
2	(Monaco) R Arneodo (France) J Eysseric	3	6^{6}

Quarterfinals
1	(Ecuador) D Hidalgo (Colombia) C Rodríguez	6	5	[2]
WC	(Switzerland) J Paul (Switzerland) D Wenger	3	7	[10]
(Germany) M Marterer (Germany) M Moraing	6	3	[8]
(Poland) K Drzewiecki (Finland) P Niklas-Salminen	2	6	[10]
(Italy) M Bortolotti (Spain) S Martos Gornés	3	6^{3}
3	(New Zealand) A Sitak (Netherlands) S Verbeek	6	7^{7}
(Czech Republic) Z Kolář (Czech Republic) A Pavlásek	6^{6}	6	[10]
(Austria) M Neuchrist (Austria) T-S Weissborn	7^{8}	4	[8]

Semifinals
WC	(Switzerland) J Paul (Switzerland) D Wenger	3	6^{0}
(Poland) K Drzewiecki (Finland) P Niklas-Salminen	6	7^{7}
3	(New Zealand) A Sitak (Netherlands) S Verbeek	3	6^{3}
(Czech Republic) Z Kolář (Czech Republic) A Pavlásek	6	7^{7}

Final
(Poland) K Drzewiecki (Finland) P Niklas-Salminen	3	5
(Czech Republic) Z Kolář (Czech Republic) A Pavlásek	6	7
