= 2022 Saturn Oil Open – Singles =

Singles
- 2022 Saturn Oil Open

Final
- Champion: (Slovakia) Lukáš Klein
- Runner-up: (Belgium) Zizou Bergs
- Score: 6–2, 6–4

Events
Singles	Doubles
Troisdorf Challenger	· 2023 →

This was the first edition of the tournament.

Lukáš Klein won the title after defeating Zizou Bergs 6–2, 6–4 in the final.

== Seeds ==
1. (Slovakia) Andrej Martin (first round)
2. (Chile) Tomás Barrios Vera (first round)
3. Roman Safiullin (semifinals)
4. (France) Hugo Grenier (quarterfinals)
5. (Argentina) Facundo Mena (first round)
6. (Switzerland) Dominic Stricker (second round)
7. (Italy) Thomas Fabbiano (second round)
8. (Argentina) Thiago Agustín Tirante (first round)

== Draw ==
=== Key ===
- Q = Qualifier
- WC = Wild card
- LL = Lucky loser
- Alt = Alternate
- SE = Special exempt
- PR = Protected ranking
- ITF = ITF entry
- JE = Junior exempt
- w/o = Walkover
- r = Retired
- d = Defaulted
- SR = Special ranking

=== Finals ===
Semifinals
WC	(Germany) Henri Squire	4	1
Q	(Slovakia) Lukáš Klein	6	6
3	Roman Safiullin	1	6	3
(Belgium) Zizou Bergs	6	4	6

Final
Q	(Slovakia) Lukáš Klein	6	6
(Belgium) Zizou Bergs	2	4

=== Top half ===
First round
1	(Slovakia) A Martin	2	5
E Donskoy	6	7
(Belgium) K Coppejans	2	0
Q	(Germany) Lucas Gerch	6	6
Q	(Japan) S Mochizuki	6	5	4
WC	(Germany) H Squire	3	7	6
(Poland) K Żuk	3	2
7	(Italy) T Fabbiano	6	6
4	(France) H Grenier	6	6
WC	(Germany) M Topo	2	4
Q	(Bosnia and Herzegovina) A Šetkić	4	6	6
(Slovakia) L Lacko	6	3	4
(Germany) N Kuhn	7^{8}	6
(Brazil) T Seyboth Wild	6^{6}	4
Q	(Slovakia) L Klein	6	6
5	(Argentina) F Mena	2	2

Second round
E Donskoy	6	6
Q	(Germany) L Gerch	3	4
WC	(Germany) H Squire	6	6
7	(Italy) T Fabbiano	4	3
4	(France) H Grenier	7^{9}	6
Q	(Bosnia and Herzegovina) A Šetkić	6^{7}	3
(Germany) N Kuhn	3	1^{r}
Q	(Slovakia) L Klein	6	4

Quarterfinals
E Donskoy	6	3	4
WC	(Germany) H Squire	2	6	6
4	(France) H Grenier	6^{5}	4
Q	(Slovakia) L Klein	7^{7}	6

Semifinals
WC	(Germany) H Squire	4	1
Q	(Slovakia) L Klein	6	6

=== Bottom half ===
First round
8	(Argentina) TA Tirante	4	7	2
Q	Andrey Chepelev	6	5	6
Alt	(Canada) S Diez	6^{6}	3
(Portugal) F Ferreira Silva	7^{8}	6
Alt	(Lebanon) B Hassan	0	6	4
Alt	(Germany) J Lenz	6	4	6
Alt	(Poland) D Michalski	0	1
3	R Safiullin	6	6
6	(Switzerland) D Stricker	3	6	6
Q	(Switzerland) R Bertola	6	2	1
(Belgium) Z Bergs	3	7^{8}	7^{7}
WC	(Germany) R Molleker	6	6^{6}	6^{5}
(Netherlands) J Sels	6	4	6
(Brazil) M Pucinelli de Almeida	4	6	4
(Switzerland) A Ritschard	7	7^{7}
2	(Chile) T Barrios Vera	5	6^{4}

Second round
Q	A Chepelev	2	5
(Portugal) F Ferreira Silva	6	7
Alt	(Germany) J Lenz	3	7	4
3	R Safiullin	6	5	6
6	(Switzerland) D Stricker	1	6	1
(Belgium) Z Bergs	6	3	6
(Netherlands) J Sels	6	6
(Switzerland) A Ritschard	3	4

Quarterfinals
(Portugal) F Ferreira Silva	6^{4}	3
3	R Safiullin	7^{7}	6
(Belgium) Z Bergs	6	7
(Netherlands) J Sels	3	5

Semifinals
3	R Safiullin	1	6	3
(Belgium) Z Bergs	6	4	6
