= 2024 Zug Open – Singles =

Singles
- 2024 Zug Open

Final
- Champion: (Switzerland) Jérôme Kym
- Runner-up: (Argentina) Román Andrés Burruchaga
- Score: 6–4, 6–4

Events
Singles	Doubles
- Zug Open

Arthur Rinderknech was the defending champion but chose not to defend his title.

Jérôme Kym won the title after defeating Román Andrés Burruchaga 6–4, 6–4 in the final.

== Seeds ==
1. (Netherlands) Botic van de Zandschulp (first round)
2. (Italy) Matteo Gigante (first round)
3. (Argentina) Román Andrés Burruchaga (final)
4. (Argentina) Juan Manuel Cerúndolo (first round)
5. (Austria) Jurij Rodionov (first round)
6. (Peru) Juan Pablo Varillas (second round)
7. (France) Matteo Martineau (first round)
8. (Switzerland) Dominic Stricker (first round)

== Draw ==
Key

- Q = Qualifier
- WC = Wild card
- LL = Lucky loser
- Alt = Alternate
- ITF = ITF entry
- PR = Protected ranking
- SR = Special ranking
- SE = Special exempt
- JE = Junior exempt
- JR = Junior Accelerator Programme entrant
- CO = College Accelerator Programme entrant
- NG = Next Gen Accelerator Program entrant
- w/o = Walkover
- r = Retired
- d = Defaulted

=== Finals ===
Semifinals
(Switzerland) Marc-Andrea Hüsler	6	1	4
3	(Argentina) Román Andrés Burruchaga	3	6	6
Alt	(Switzerland) Jérôme Kym	6	7^{7}
(Belgium) Joris De Loore	3	6^{3}

Final
3	(Argentina) Román Andrés Burruchaga	4	4
Alt	(Switzerland) Jérôme Kym	6	6

=== Top half ===
First round
1	(Netherlands) B van de Zandschulp	6^{5}	6	6^{5}
WC	(Switzerland) M Brunold	7^{7}	3	7^{7}
(Switzerland) M-A Hüsler	6	6
(Spain) B Zapata Miralles	0	3
WC	(Switzerland) H Bernet	4	7	6
Q	(Netherlands) Ryan Nijboer	6	5	4
WC	(Switzerland) R Bertola	5	4
6	(Peru) JP Varillas	7	6
3	(Argentina) RA Burruchaga	6^{7}	7	7^{7}
Q	(Switzerland) D Dietrich	7^{9}	5	6^{2}
Q	(Brazil) M Alves	4	6	4
(Belgium) A Blockx	6	3	6
(Jordan) A Shelbayh	4	6	7^{10}
Q	(Switzerland) J Paul	6	3	6^{8}
(Germany) R Molleker	7^{7}	6^{3}	7^{7}
8	(Switzerland) D Stricker	6^{2}	7^{7}	6^{5}

Second round
WC	(Switzerland) M Brunold	3	1
(Switzerland) M-A Hüsler	6	6
WC	(Switzerland) H Bernet	7	6
6	(Peru) JP Varillas	5	3
3	(Argentina) RA Burruchaga	6	6
(Belgium) A Blockx	4	3
(Jordan) A Shelbayh	6	6
(Germany) R Molleker	4	2

Quarterfinals
(Switzerland) M-A Hüsler	6	6
WC	(Switzerland) H Bernet	4	4
3	(Argentina) RA Burruchaga	6	6
(Jordan) A Shelbayh	1	4

Semifinals
(Switzerland) M-A Hüsler	6	1	4
3	(Argentina) RA Burruchaga	3	6	6

=== Bottom half ===
First round
5	(Austria) J Rodionov	3	4
(Paraguay) AD Vallejo	6	6
Q	(Switzerland) D Wenger	3	2
Q	(Germany) M Topo	6	6
(Poland) K Majchrzak	7^{7}	6
(Poland) M Kaśnikowski	6^{3}	3
Alt	(Switzerland) J Kym	6	6
4	(Argentina) JM Cerúndolo	4	0
7	(France) M Martineau	6^{6}	6	5
Alt	(France) G Blancaneaux	7^{8}	3	7
(France) B Paire	3	6^{7}
(France) Q Halys	6	7^{9}
(Belgium) J De Loore	6	7^{7}
(France) M Janvier	2	6^{3}
(Australia) O Jasika	6	7
2	(Italy) M Gigante	2	5

Second round
(Paraguay) AD Vallejo	6	3	3
Q	(Germany) M Topo	4	6	6
(Poland) K Majchrzak	4	6^{5}
Alt	(Switzerland) J Kym	6	7^{7}
Alt	(France) G Blancaneaux	6	6
(France) Q Halys	3	4
(Belgium) J De Loore	6	7^{9}
(Australia) O Jasika	4	6^{7}

Quarterfinals
Q	(Germany) M Topo	7	6^{10}	6^{6}
Alt	(Switzerland) J Kym	5	7^{12}	7^{8}
Alt	(France) G Blancaneaux	3	4
(Belgium) J De Loore	6	6

Semifinals
Alt	(Switzerland) J Kym	6	7^{7}
(Belgium) J De Loore	3	6^{3}
