= 2022 Saturn Oil Open =

- Date: 23 – 29 May
- Edition: 1st
- Surface: Clay
- Location: Troisdorf, Germany

Champions

Singles
- (Slovakia) Lukáš Klein

Doubles
- (Jamaica) Dustin Brown / (United States) Evan King
Troisdorf Challenger	· 2023 →

The 2022 Saturn Oil Open was a professional tennis tournament that was played on clay courts. It was the first edition of the tournament which was part of the 2022 ATP Challenger Tour. It took place in Troisdorf, Germany between 23 and 29 May 2022.

== Singles main-draw entrants ==
=== Seeds ===
Country	Player	Rank^{1}	Seed
SVK	Andrej Martin	130	1
CHI	Tomás Barrios Vera	140	2
	Roman Safiullin	147	3
FRA	Hugo Grenier	151	4
ARG	Facundo Mena	167	5
SUI	Dominic Stricker	177	6
ITA	Thomas Fabbiano	187	7
ARG	Thiago Agustín Tirante	192	8

- ^{1} Rankings are as of 16 May 2022.

=== Other entrants ===
The following players received wildcards into the singles main draw:

- (Germany) Rudolf Molleker
- (Germany) Henri Squire
- (Germany) Marko Topo

The following players received entry into the singles main draw as alternates:

- (Canada) Steven Diez
- (Lebanon) Benjamin Hassan
- (Germany) Julian Lenz
- (Poland) Daniel Michalski

The following players received entry from the qualifying draw:

- (Switzerland) Rémy Bertola
- Andrey Chepelev
- (Germany) Lucas Gerch
- (Slovakia) Lukáš Klein
- (Japan) Shintaro Mochizuki
- (Bosnia and Herzegovina) Aldin Šetkić

== Champions ==
=== Singles ===
- (Slovakia) Lukáš Klein def. (Belgium) Zizou Bergs 6–2, 6–4.

=== Doubles ===
- (Jamaica) Dustin Brown / (United States) Evan King def. (Germany) Hendrik Jebens / (Poland) Piotr Matuszewski 6–4, 7–5.
