= 2021 Zadar Open – Doubles =

Doubles
- 2021 Zadar Open

Final
- Champions: (Slovenia) Blaž Kavčič (Slovenia) Blaž Rola
- Runners-up: (Slovakia) Lukáš Klein (Slovakia) Alex Molčan
- Score: 2–6, 6–2, [10–3]

Events
| Singles | Doubles |
- Zadar Open

This was the first edition of the tournament.

Blaž Kavčič and Blaž Rola won the title after defeating Lukáš Klein and Alex Molčan 2–6, 6–2, [10–3] in the final.

== Seeds ==
1. (Kazakhstan) Andrey Golubev / (Kazakhstan) Aleksandr Nedovyesov (semifinals)
2. (Mexico) Miguel Ángel Reyes-Varela / (Brazil) Fernando Romboli (first round)
3. (Russia) Teymuraz Gabashvili / (Czech Republic) Zdeněk Kolář (first round)
4. (Peru) Sergio Galdós / (Brazil) Rafael Matos (withdrew)

== Draw ==
Key

- Q = Qualifier
- WC = Wild card
- LL = Lucky loser
- Alt = Alternate
- ITF = ITF entry
- PR = Protected ranking
- SR = Special ranking
- SE = Special exempt
- JE = Junior exempt
- JR = Junior Accelerator Programme entrant
- CO = College Accelerator Programme entrant
- NG = Next Gen Accelerator Program entrant
- w/o = Walkover
- r = Retired
- d = Defaulted

First round
1 | (Kazakhstan) A Golubev (Kazakhstan) A Nedovyesov | 6 | 6
(Italy) M Bortolotti (Italy) A Giannessi | 4 | 4
(Bosnia and Herzegovina) T Brkić (Croatia) N Serdarušić | 6 | 6
Alt | (Czech Republic) V Kopřiva (Spain) N Sánchez Izquierdo | 1 | 2
(United States) J Cerretani (Romania) VV Cornea | 7 | 6^{5} | [5]
(Slovakia) L Klein (Slovakia) A Molčan | 5 | 7^{7} | [10]
(Netherlands) I Sijsling (Netherlands) M Vervoort | 6 | 6
WC | (Croatia) F Ninčević (Croatia) Luka Ninčević | 1 | 1
(Croatia) I Sabanov (Croatia) M Sabanov | 6 | 6
3 | (Russia) T Gabashvili (Czech Republic) Z Kolář | 2 | 3
Alt | (Ukraine) V Orlov (Chinese Taipei) T-l Wu | 3 | 1
(Slovenia) B Kavčič (Slovenia) B Rola | 6 | 6
WC | (Croatia) Duje Kekez (Croatia) M Poljičak | 4 | 6 | [10]
2 | (Mexico) MÁ Reyes-Varela (Brazil) F Romboli | 6 | 3 | [1]

Quarterfinals
1 | (Kazakhstan) A Golubev (Kazakhstan) A Nedovyesov | 1 | 6 | [12]
(Bosnia and Herzegovina) T Brkić (Croatia) N Serdarušić | 6 | 2 | [10]
(Italy) GM Moroni (Italy) A Pellegrino | 3 | 3
(Slovakia) L Klein (Slovakia) A Molčan | 6 | 6
(Netherlands) I Sijsling (Netherlands) M Vervoort | 4 | 6 | [8]
(Croatia) I Sabanov (Croatia) M Sabanov | 6 | 3 | [10]
(Slovenia) B Kavčič (Slovenia) B Rola | 6 | 6
WC | (Croatia) D Kekez (Croatia) M Poljičak | 4 | 3

Semifinals
1 | (Kazakhstan) A Golubev (Kazakhstan) A Nedovyesov | 3 | 4
(Slovakia) L Klein (Slovakia) A Molčan | 6 | 6
(Croatia) I Sabanov (Croatia) M Sabanov | 5 | 4
(Slovenia) B Kavčič (Slovenia) B Rola | 7 | 6

Final
(Slovakia) L Klein (Slovakia) A Molčan | 6 | 2 | [3]
(Slovenia) B Kavčič (Slovenia) B Rola | 2 | 6 | [10]
