= 2026 Busan Open – Singles =

Singles
- 2026 Busan Open

Final
- Champion: (Switzerland) Leandro Riedi
- Runner-up: (China) Bu Yunchaokete
- Score: 3–6, 6–3, 6–2

Events
Singles	Doubles
- Busan Open

Térence Atmane was the defending champion but chose not to defend his title.

Leandro Riedi won the title after defeating Bu Yunchaokete 3–6, 6–3, 6–2 in the final.

== Seeds ==
1. (Australia) James Duckworth (withdrew)
2. (Australia) Adam Walton (quarterfinals)
3. (Japan) Sho Shimabukuro (quarterfinals)
4. (Hong Kong) Coleman Wong (second round)
5. (Australia) Dane Sweeny (first round)
6. (Australia) Alex Bolt (quarterfinals)
7. (China) Bu Yunchaokete (final)
8. (Switzerland) Leandro Riedi (champion)

== Draw ==
Key

- Q = Qualifier
- WC = Wild card
- LL = Lucky loser
- Alt = Alternate
- ITF = ITF entry
- PR = Protected ranking
- SR = Special ranking
- SE = Special exempt
- JE = Junior exempt
- JR = Junior Accelerator Programme entrant
- CO = College Accelerator Programme entrant
- NG = Next Gen Accelerator Program entrant
- w/o = Walkover
- r = Retired
- d = Defaulted

=== Finals ===
Semifinals
(United Kingdom) Liam Broady	6^{3}	3^{r}
8	(Switzerland) Leandro Riedi	7^{7}	2
6	(Australia) Alex Bolt	5	2
7	(China) Bu Yunchaokete	7	6

Final
8	(Switzerland) Leandro Riedi	3	6	6
7	(China) Bu Yunchaokete	6	3	2

=== Top half ===
First round
Q	(Thailand) K Samrej	6	4	6^{4}
(Denmark) A Holmgren	3	6	7^{7}
(Canada) A Galarneau	6	7
(Japan) K Uchida	4	5
(United Kingdom) L Broady	6	6
(United States) M Cassone	0	1
PR	I Ivashka	7^{7}	6^{4}	6
5	(Australia) D Sweeny	6^{1}	7^{7}	2
3	(Japan) S Shimabukuro	6	6
I Simakin	3	3
WC	(South Korea) U-s Park	6	4	4
(Kazakhstan) B Zhukayev	4	6	6
(China) Y Zhou	1	0^{r}
P Kotov	6	2
WC	(South Korea) S-w Kwon	6^{2}	4
8	(Switzerland) L Riedi	7^{7}	6

Second round
(Denmark) A Holmgren	6	6
(Canada) A Galarneau	1	4
(United Kingdom) L Broady	6	6
PR	I Ivashka	1	3
3	(Japan) S Shimabukuro	6	4	7^{7}
(Kazakhstan) B Zhukayev	3	6	6^{4}
P Kotov	6^{7}	2^{r}
8	(Switzerland) L Riedi	7^{9}	5

Quarterfinals
(Denmark) A Holmgren	3	6	4
(United Kingdom) L Broady	6	4	6
3	(Japan) S Shimabukuro	5	1
8	(Switzerland) L Riedi	7	6

Semifinals
(United Kingdom) L Broady	6^{3}	3^{r}
8	(Switzerland) L Riedi	7^{7}	2

=== Bottom half ===
First round
6	(Australia) A Bolt	7	7^{7}
(Australia) J McCabe	5	6^{2}
Q	(Chinese Taipei) T-l Wu	6	6
Q	(Japan) T Daniel	4	4
(Japan) R Noguchi	6	6
(France) C Chidekh	2	2
Q	(Japan) Renta Tokuda	6^{4}	4
4	(Hong Kong) C Wong	7^{7}	6
7	(China) Y Bu	6	6
WC	(South Korea) Y-s Chung	1	4
Q	M Sharipov	6	5	7^{7}
(Japan) Y Uchiyama	3	7	6^{4}
LL	(Japan) J Trotter	7^{7}	3	6
Q	(Australia) Ja Delaney	6^{1}	6	1
(Chinese Taipei) Y-h Hsu	2	7	2
2	(Australia) A Walton	6	5	6

Second round
6	(Australia) A Bolt	4	6	7^{7}
Q	(Chinese Taipei) T-l Wu	6	4	6^{3}
(Japan) R Noguchi	6	6
4	(Hong Kong) C Wong	2	2
7	(China) Y Bu	6	6
Q	M Sharipov	4	2
LL	(Japan) J Trotter	4	7^{7}	3
2	(Australia) A Walton	6	6^{2}	6

Quarterfinals
6	(Australia) A Bolt	7^{7}	7^{7}
(Japan) R Noguchi	6^{4}	6^{5}
7	(China) Y Bu	6	7^{8}
2	(Australia) A Walton	4	6^{6}

Semifinals
6	(Australia) A Bolt	5	2
7	(China) Y Bu	7	6
