= 2022 Saturn Oil Open – Doubles =

Doubles
- 2022 Saturn Oil Open

Final
- Champions: (Jamaica) Dustin Brown (United States) Evan King
- Runners-up: (Germany) Hendrik Jebens (Poland) Piotr Matuszewski
- Score: 6–4, 7–5

Events
Singles	Doubles
- Troisdorf Challenger

This was the first edition of the tournament.

Dustin Brown and Evan King won the title after defeating Hendrik Jebens and Piotr Matuszewski 6–4, 7–5 in the final.

== Seeds ==
1. (Slovakia) Andrej Martin / (Austria) Tristan-Samuel Weissborn (first round)
2. (Jamaica) Dustin Brown / (United States) Evan King (champions)
3. (United States) Alex Lawson / (Switzerland) Luca Margaroli (semifinals)
4. (Germany) Fabian Fallert / (Germany) Julian Lenz (quarterfinals)

== Draw ==
Key

- Q = Qualifier
- WC = Wild card
- LL = Lucky loser
- Alt = Alternate
- ITF = ITF entry
- PR = Protected ranking
- SR = Special ranking
- SE = Special exempt
- JE = Junior exempt
- JR = Junior Accelerator Programme entrant
- CO = College Accelerator Programme entrant
- NG = Next Gen Accelerator Program entrant
- w/o = Walkover
- r = Retired
- d = Defaulted

First round
1	(Slovakia) A Martin (Austria) T-S Weissborn	6	4	[13]
(United States) J Cerretani (Netherlands) J Sels	3	6	[15]
(Belgium) R Bemelmans (Belgium) Z Bergs	5	6	[8]
(Germany) H Jebens (Poland) P Matuszewski	7	2	[10]
3	(United States) A Lawson (Switzerland) L Margaroli	7^{7}	3	[10]
(India) A Chandrasekar (India) VS Prashanth	6^{5}	6	[7]
(Chile) T Barrios Vera (Argentina) F Mena	6	7^{7}
(Germany) C Frantzen (Germany) T Sandkaulen	2	6^{5}
(Germany) Niklas Schell (Germany) H Squire	7^{7}	5	[8]
E Donskoy; R Safiullin	6^{5}	7	[10]
(Netherlands) M Hermans (Kazakhstan) G Lomakin	2	2
4	(Germany) F Fallert (Germany) J Lenz	6	6
WC	(Germany) Yannick Stephan Born (Germany) Daniel Milardović	3	4
(Chile) Miguel Fernando Pereira (Brazil) Gabriel Roveri Sidney	6	6
WC	(Germany) N Kuhn (Germany) R Molleker	6	6^{2}	[5]
2	(Jamaica) D Brown (United States) E King	4	7^{7}	[10]

Quarterfinals
(United States) J Cerretani (Netherlands) J Sels	4	3
(Germany) H Jebens (Poland) P Matuszewski	6	6
3	(United States) A Lawson (Switzerland) L Margaroli	2	6	[10]
(Chile) T Barrios Vera (Argentina) F Mena	6	3	[8]
E Donskoy; R Safiullin	6^{9}	7^{7}	[10]
4	(Germany) F Fallert (Germany) J Lenz	7^{11}	6^{1}	[4]
(Chile) MF Pereira (Brazil) G Roveri Sidney	1	0
2	(Jamaica) D Brown (United States) E King	6	6

Semifinals
(Germany) H Jebens (Poland) P Matuszewski	7^{7}	6
3	(United States) A Lawson (Switzerland) L Margaroli	6^{4}	3
E Donskoy; R Safiullin	4	7^{10}	[9]
2	(Jamaica) D Brown (United States) E King	6	6^{8}	[11]

Final
(Germany) H Jebens (Poland) P Matuszewski	4	5
2	(Jamaica) D Brown (United States) E King	6	7
