= 2023 Zug Open =

- Date: 24 – 30 July
- Edition: 2nd
- Surface: Clay
- Location: Zug, Switzerland

Champions

Singles
- (France) Arthur Rinderknech

Doubles
- (France) Théo Arribagé / (France) Luca Sanchez
- Zug Open

The 2023 Finaport Zug Open was a professional tennis tournament played on outdoor clay courts. It was the 2nd edition of the tournament and part of the 2023 ATP Challenger Tour. It took place in Zug, Switzerland between 24 and 30 July 2023.

== Singles main draw entrants ==
=== Seeds ===
Country	Player	Rank^{1}	Seed
FRA	Arthur Rinderknech	82	1
SUI	Dominic Stricker	106	2
AUT	Jurij Rodionov	118	3
ITA	Fabio Fognini	128	4
FIN	Otto Virtanen	132	5
FRA	Harold Mayot	154	6
SUI	Alexander Ritschard	163	7
BUL	Dimitar Kuzmanov	174	8

- ^{1} Rankings as of 17 July 2023.

=== Other entrants ===
The following players received wildcards into the singles main draw:

- (Switzerland) Mika Brunold
- (Switzerland) Kilian Feldbausch
- (Italy) Matteo Gigante

The following players received entry into the singles main draw as alternates:

- (Tunisia) Aziz Dougaz
- (Brazil) Matheus Pucinelli de Almeida

The following players received entry from the qualifying draw:

- (Switzerland) Rémy Bertola
- (Switzerland) Dylan Dietrich
- (Italy) Gianmarco Ferrari
- (France) Manuel Guinard
- (Germany) Tim Handel
- (Turkey) Ergi Kırkın

== Champions ==
=== Singles ===
- (France) Arthur Rinderknech def. (Belgium) Joris De Loore 3–6, 6–3, 6–4.

=== Doubles ===
- (France) Théo Arribagé / (France) Luca Sanchez def. (Turkey) Ergi Kırkın / (Czech Republic) Dalibor Svrčina 6–3, 7–5.
