= 2023 Sparkassen ATP Challenger – Singles =

Singles
- 2023 Sparkassen ATP Challenger

Final
- Champion: (Slovakia) Lukáš Klein
- Runner-up: (Poland) Maks Kaśnikowski
- Score: 6–7^{(4–7)}, 7–6^{(7–4)}, 7–6^{(8–6)}

Events
Singles	Doubles
← 2022 ·	Sparkassen ATP Challenger	· 2024 →

Borna Gojo was the defending champion but chose not to defend his title.

Lukáš Klein won the title after defeating Maks Kaśnikowski 6–7^{(4–7)}, 7–6^{(7–4)}, 7–6^{(8–6)} in the final.

== Seeds ==
1. (Jordan) Abdullah Shelbayh (second round)
2. (Belgium) Gauthier Onclin (first round)
3. (Italy) Federico Gaio (semifinals)
4. (Italy) Francesco Maestrelli (first round)
5. (Estonia) Mark Lajal (second round)
6. (Spain) Alejandro Moro Cañas (first round)
7. (Italy) Stefano Napolitano (first round)
8. (Ukraine) Illya Marchenko (second round)

== Draw ==
=== Key ===
- Q = Qualifier
- WC = Wild card
- LL = Lucky loser
- Alt = Alternate
- ITF = ITF entry
- PR = Protected ranking
- SR = Special ranking
- SE = Special exempt
- JE = Junior exempt
- JR = Junior Accelerator Programme entrant
- CO = College Accelerator Programme entrant
- NG = Next Gen Accelerator Program entrant
- w/o = Walkover
- r = Retired
- d = Defaulted

=== Finals ===
Semifinals
Q	(Slovakia) Lukáš Klein	6	7^{7}
(United Kingdom) Billy Harris	3	6^{5}
3	(Italy) Federico Gaio	3	7	2
(Poland) Maks Kaśnikowski	6	5	6

Final
Q	(Slovakia) Lukáš Klein	6^{4}	7^{7}	7^{8}
(Poland) Maks Kaśnikowski	7^{7}	6^{4}	6^{6}

=== Top half ===
First round
1	(Jordan) A Shelbayh	6	6
(Cyprus) M Efstathiou	1	2
Y Demin	6^{3}	4
Alt	(Italy) E Dalla Valle	7^{7}	6
Alt	(Czech Republic) A Paulson	5	4
Q	(Slovakia) L Klein	7	6
Q	(Bosnia and Herzegovina) M Bašić	7^{7}	6
6	(Spain) A Moro Cañas	6^{3}	3
4	(Italy) F Maestrelli	6	6^{4}	1
(Switzerland) A Bellier	4	7^{7}	6
Q	(Netherlands) Ryan Nijboer	3	6^{7}
Q	(Estonia) D Glinka	6	7^{9}
Q	(Czech Republic) H Bartoň	6^{5}	7^{7}	6
(Spain) D Jordà Sanchis	7^{7}	6^{4}	3
(United Kingdom) B Harris	7	6
7	(Italy) S Napolitano	5	3

Second round
1	(Jordan) A Shelbayh	6	3	4
Alt	(Italy) E Dalla Valle	4	6	6
Q	(Slovakia) L Klein	7^{7}	7^{7}
Q	(Bosnia and Herzegovina) M Bašić	6^{5}	6^{3}
(Switzerland) A Bellier	4	4
Q	(Estonia) D Glinka	6	6
Q	(Czech Republic) H Bartoň	2	6^{3}
(United Kingdom) B Harris	6	7^{7}

Quarterfinals
Alt	(Italy) E Dalla Valle	3	2
Q	(Slovakia) L Klein	6	6
Q	(Estonia) D Glinka	6^{3}	6	3
(United Kingdom) B Harris	7^{7}	4	6

Semifinals
Q	(Slovakia) L Klein	6	7^{7}
(United Kingdom) B Harris	3	6^{5}

=== Bottom half ===
First round
8	(Ukraine) I Marchenko	6	6
WC	(Italy) L Rottoli	4	4
Q	(Italy) Luca Giacomini	6	6
(Germany) L Wessels	3	4
WC	(Italy) F Forti	7^{7}	6
(Slovakia) N Gombos	6^{5}	4
(Austria) M Neuchrist	4	4
3	(Italy) F Gaio	6	6
5	(Estonia) M Lajal	6	6
(Poland) K Żuk	3	4
(France) M Bourgue	6	6^{6}	6
(Portugal) J Sousa	3	7^{8}	4
(Belgium) M Geerts	6	6
WC	(Italy) Lorenzo Carboni	4	1
(Poland) M Kaśnikowski	6	6
2	(Belgium) G Onclin	1	4

Second round
8	(Ukraine) I Marchenko	6	2	6^{5}
Q	(Italy) L Giacomini	4	6	7^{7}
WC	(Italy) F Forti	6	3	3
3	(Italy) F Gaio	3	6	6
5	(Estonia) M Lajal	6	4	2
(France) M Bourgue	3	6	6
(Belgium) M Geerts	7	3	6^{4}
(Poland) M Kaśnikowski	5	6	7^{7}

Quarterfinals
Q	(Italy) L Giacomini	6^{3}	6^{2}
3	(Italy) F Gaio	7^{7}	7^{7}
(France) M Bourgue	6^{3}	3
(Poland) M Kaśnikowski	7^{7}	6

Semifinals
3	(Italy) F Gaio	3	7	2
(Poland) M Kaśnikowski	6	5	6
