= 2023 Sparkassen ATP Challenger =

- Date: 23–29 October
- Edition: 14th
- Surface: Hard (indoor)
- Location: Ortisei, Italy

Champions

Singles
- (Slovakia) Lukáš Klein

Doubles
- (Czech Republic) Andrew Paulson / (Czech Republic) Patrik Rikl
- Sparkassen ATP Challenger

The 2023 Sparkasse Val Gardena Südtirol was a professional tennis tournament played on indoor hard courts in Ortisei, Italy between 23 and 29 October 2023. It was the 14th edition of the tournament and was part of the 2023 ATP Challenger Tour.

== Singles main-draw entrants ==
=== Seeds ===
Country	Player	Rank^{1}	Seed
JOR	Abdullah Shelbayh	212	1
BEL	Gauthier Onclin	214	2
ITA	Federico Gaio	217	3
ITA	Francesco Maestrelli	218	4
EST	Mark Lajal	229	5
ESP	Alejandro Moro Cañas	233	6
ITA	Stefano Napolitano	239	7
UKR	Illya Marchenko	248	8

- ^{1} Rankings are as of 16 October 2023.

=== Other entrants ===
The following players received wildcards into the singles main draw:

- (Italy) Lorenzo Carboni
- (Italy) Francesco Forti
- (Italy) Lorenzo Rottoli

The following players received entry into the singles main draw as alternates:

- (Italy) Enrico Dalla Valle
- (Czech Republic) Andrew Paulson

The following players received entry from the qualifying draw:

- (Czech Republic) Hynek Bartoň
- (Bosnia and Herzegovina) Mirza Bašić
- (Italy) Luca Giacomini
- (Estonia) Daniil Glinka
- (Slovakia) Lukáš Klein
- (Netherlands) Ryan Nijboer

== Champions ==
=== Singles ===
- (Slovakia) Lukáš Klein def. (Poland) Maks Kaśnikowski 6–7^{(4–7)}, 7–6^{(7–4)}, 7–6^{(8–6)}.

=== Doubles ===
- (Czech Republic) Andrew Paulson / (Czech Republic) Patrik Rikl def. (Austria) Maximilian Neuchrist / (Switzerland) Jakub Paul 4–6, 7–6^{(9–7)}, [11–9].
