= 2024 Zug Open =

- Date: 22 – 28 July
- Edition: 3rd
- Surface: Clay
- Location: Zug, Switzerland

Champions

Singles
- (Switzerland) Jérôme Kym

Doubles
- (Austria) Jurij Rodionov / (Ukraine) Volodymyr Uzhylovskyi
- Zug Open

The 2024 Dialectic Zug Open was a professional tennis tournament played on outdoor clay courts. It was the 3rd edition of the tournament and part of the 2024 ATP Challenger Tour. It took place in Zug, Switzerland between 22 and 28 July 2024.

== Singles main draw entrants ==
=== Seeds ===
Country	Player	Rank^{1}	Seed
NED	Botic van de Zandschulp	87	1
ITA	Matteo Gigante	146	2
ARG	Román Andrés Burruchaga	147	3
ARG	Juan Manuel Cerúndolo	152	4
AUT	Jurij Rodionov	159	5
PER	Juan Pablo Varillas	162	6
FRA	Matteo Martineau	172	7
SUI	Dominic Stricker	175	8

- ^{1} Rankings as of 15 July 2024.

=== Other entrants ===
The following players received wildcards into the singles main draw:

- (Switzerland) Henry Bernet
- (Switzerland) Rémy Bertola
- (Switzerland) Mika Brunold

The following players received entry into the singles main draw as alternates:

- (France) Geoffrey Blancaneaux
- (Switzerland) Jérôme Kym

The following players received entry from the qualifying draw:

- (Brazil) Mateus Alves
- (Switzerland) Dylan Dietrich
- (Netherlands) Ryan Nijboer
- (Switzerland) Jakub Paul
- (Germany) Marko Topo
- (Switzerland) Damien Wenger

== Champions ==
=== Singles ===
- (Switzerland) Jérôme Kym def. (Argentina) Román Andrés Burruchaga 6–4, 6–4.

=== Doubles ===
- (Austria) Jurij Rodionov / (Ukraine) Volodymyr Uzhylovskyi def. (Japan) Seita Watanabe / (Japan) Takeru Yuzuki 7–6^{(7–5)}, 7–6^{(7–5)}.
