= 2022 Zug Open =

2022 ATP Challenger Tour tennis tournament

- Date: 25 – 31 July
- Edition: 1st
- Surface: Clay
- Location: Zug, Switzerland

Champions

Singles
- (Switzerland) Dominic Stricker

Doubles
- (Czech Republic) Zdeněk Kolář / (Czech Republic) Adam Pavlásek
- Zug Open

The 2022 Finaport Zug Open was a professional tennis tournament played on outdoor clay courts. It was the 1st edition of the tournament and part of the 2022 ATP Challenger Tour. It took place in Zug, Switzerland between 25 and 31 July 2022.

== Singles main draw entrants ==
=== Seeds ===
Country	Player	Rank^{1}	Seed
SUI	Marc-Andrea Hüsler	99	1
~~ARG~~	~~Juan Manuel Cerúndolo~~	~~110~~	~~2~~
GER	Jan-Lennard Struff	122	3
ARG	Facundo Mena	130	4
CZE	Zdeněk Kolář	137	5
ITA	Gianluca Mager	141	6
GER	Mats Moraing	142	7
BRA	Felipe Meligeni Alves	144	8

- ^{1} Rankings as of 18 July 2022.

=== Other entrants ===
The following players received wildcards into the singles main draw:

- (Switzerland) Kilian Feldbausch
- (Switzerland) Jérôme Kym
- (Switzerland) Johan Nikles

The following players received entry into the singles main draw as special exempts:

- (France) Harold Mayot
- (Hungary) ~~Zsombor Piros~~

The following players received entry from the qualifying draw:

- (France) Ugo Blanchet
- (Belgium) Kimmer Coppejans
- (Norway) Viktor Durasovic
- (Italy) Lorenzo Giustino
- (Latvia) Ernests Gulbis
- (Austria) Maximilian Neuchrist

The following players received entry as lucky losers:

- (Israel) Yshai Oliel
- (Finland) Otto Virtanen

== Champions ==
=== Singles ===
- (Switzerland) Dominic Stricker def. (Latvia) Ernests Gulbis 5–7, 6–1, 6–3.

=== Doubles ===
- (Czech Republic) Zdeněk Kolář / (Czech Republic) Adam Pavlásek def. (Poland) Karol Drzewiecki / (Finland) Patrik Niklas-Salminen 6–3, 7–5.
