= 2026 Busan Open – Doubles =

Doubles
- 2026 Busan Open

Final
- Champions: (India) Anirudh Chandrasekar (Japan) Takeru Yuzuki
- Runners-up: (Netherlands) Jean-Julien Rojer (United States) Theodore Winegar
- Score: 4–6, 6–3, [10–7]

Events
Singles	Doubles
- Busan Open

Rio Noguchi and Yuta Shimizu were the defending champions but only Shimizu chose to defend his title, partnering Saketh Myneni. They lost in the first round to Ben Jones and Joshua Paris.

Anirudh Chandrasekar and Takeru Yuzuki won the title after defeating Jean-Julien Rojer and Theodore Winegar 4–6, 6–3, [10–7] in the final.

== Seeds ==
1. (United States) Mac Kiger / (United States) Reese Stalder (quarterfinals)
2. (India) Anirudh Chandrasekar / (Japan) Takeru Yuzuki (champions)
3. (Netherlands) Jean-Julien Rojer / (United States) Theodore Winegar (final)
4. (Thailand) Pruchya Isaro / (India) Niki Kaliyanda Poonacha (quarterfinals)

== Draw ==
Key

- Q = Qualifier
- WC = Wild card
- LL = Lucky loser
- Alt = Alternate
- ITF = ITF entry
- PR = Protected ranking
- SR = Special ranking
- SE = Special exempt
- JE = Junior exempt
- JR = Junior Accelerator Programme entrant
- CO = College Accelerator Programme entrant
- NG = Next Gen Accelerator Program entrant
- w/o = Walkover
- r = Retired
- d = Defaulted

First round
1	(United States) M Kiger (United States) R Stalder	6	5	[10]
WC	(South Korea) Y-s Chung (South Korea) S-w Kwon	3	7	[6]
(Australia) A Bolt (Australia) Ja Delaney	7^{7}	4	[8]
(Japan) S Shimabukuro (Japan) K Uchida	6^{5}	6	[10]
3	(Netherlands) J-J Rojer (United States) T Winegar	7^{7}	6
(South Korea) J-s Nam (Finland) P Niklas-Salminen	6^{4}	4
(Australia) C Puttergill (Australia) D Sweeny	6	3	[12]
(Australia) K Pearson (Australia) A Walton	2	6	[10]
(India) RC Bollipalli (India) A Kadhe	6	6
(France) C Chidekh (Germany) D Masur	2	3
(Chinese Taipei) Y-h Hsu (Japan) S Watanabe	6^{5}	1
4	(Thailand) P Isaro (India) N Kaliyanda Poonacha	7^{7}	6
(United Kingdom) B Jones (United Kingdom) J Paris	6	5	[10]
PR	(India) S Myneni (Japan) Y Shimizu	4	7	[7]
WC	(South Korea) Ann Suk (South Korea) Kim Geun-jun	2	1
2	(India) A Chandrasekar (Japan) T Yuzuki	6	6

Quarterfinals
1	(United States) M Kiger (United States) R Stalder	6^{6}	6^{2}
(Japan) S Shimabukuro (Japan) K Uchida	7^{8}	7^{7}
3	(Netherlands) J-J Rojer (United States) T Winegar	6	6
(Australia) C Puttergill (Australia) D Sweeny	3	1
(India) RC Bollipalli (India) A Kadhe	6	3	[13]
4	(Thailand) P Isaro (India) N Kaliyanda Poonacha	3	6	[11]
(United Kingdom) B Jones (United Kingdom) J Paris	2	5
2	(India) A Chandrasekar (Japan) T Yuzuki	6	7

Semifinals
(Japan) S Shimabukuro (Japan) K Uchida
3	(Netherlands) J-J Rojer (United States) T Winegar	w/o
(India) RC Bollipalli (India) A Kadhe	6	6^{2}	[8]
2	(India) A Chandrasekar (Japan) T Yuzuki	4	7^{7}	[10]

Final
3	(Netherlands) J-J Rojer (United States) T Winegar	6	3	[7]
2	(India) A Chandrasekar (Japan) T Yuzuki	4	6	[10]
