= Takeru Yuzuki =

Japanese tennis player (born 1998)

- Country (sports): Japan
- Born: 22 September 1998 (age 28) Mooka, Japan
- Height: 1.96 m (6 ft 5 in)
- Plays: Left-handed (two-handed backhand)
- Prize money: US $120,399

Singles
- Career record: 0–0 (at ATP Tour level, Grand Slam level, and in Davis Cup)
- Career titles: 0
- Highest ranking: No. 1278 (15 August 2022)
- Current ranking: No. 1443 (2 March 2026)

Doubles
- Career record: 4–9 (at ATP Tour level, Grand Slam level, and in Davis Cup)
- Career titles: 4 Challengers, 6 ITF
- Highest ranking: No. 85 (13 October 2025)
- Current ranking: No. 94 (2 March 2026)

Grand Slam doubles results
- Australian Open: 1R (2025)
- French Open: 1R (2026)
- Wimbledon: 1R (2026)
- Last updated on: 2 March 2026.

Takeru Yuzuki (柚木 武, Yuzuki Takeru; born 22 September 1998) is a Japanese tennis player who specializes in doubles. He has a career high ATP doubles ranking of world No. 85 achieved on 13 October 2025.

== Career ==
Yuzuki was born in 1998 in Mooka, Tochigi Prefecture, Japan. Yuzuki graduated from Hosei University in 2021.

Yuzuki made his ATP main draw debut at the 2023 Japan Open Tennis Championships after entering the doubles main draw with Seita Watanabe as lucky losers. In October 2024, he won the men's doubles at the All Japan Tennis Championships with Seita Watanabe.

Yuzuki made his Grand Slam main draw debut at the 2025 Australian Open after entering the doubles main draw with Seita Watanabe as a wildcard pair.

Yuzuki won his first ATP tour level match at the 2025 Japan Open after entering the doubles main draw with Rohan Bopanna as a wildcard pair. The pair reached the finals before losing to second seeds Édouard Roger-Vasselin and Hugo Nys. As a result Yuzuki reached the top 100 at world No. 86 in the doubles rankings on 29 September 2025.

== ATP Tour finals ==
=== Doubles: 1 (1 runner-up) ===
Legend Grand Slam tournaments (0–0) ATP World Tour Finals (0–0) ATP World Tour Masters 1000 (0–0) ATP World Tour 500 Series (0–1) ATP World Tour 250 Series (0–0)	Finals by surface Hard (0–1) Clay (0–0) Grass (0–0)	Finals by setting Outdoor (0–1) Indoor (0–0)

Result	W–L	Date	Tournament	Tier	Surface	Partner	Opponents	Score
Loss	0–1	Sep 2025	Japan Open, Japan	500 Series	Hard	(India) Rohan Bopanna	(Monaco) Hugo Nys (France) Édouard Roger-Vasselin	5–7, 5–7

== ATP Challenger and ITF Futures finals ==
=== Doubles: 20 (11 titles, 8 runner-ups, 1 non-complete) ===
Legend ATP Challenger (5-8) ITF Futures (6-0)	Finals by surface Hard (9–4) Clay (2–3) Grass (0–1)

Result	W–L	Date	Tournament	Tier	Surface	Partner	Opponents	Score
Win	1–0	May 2022	M25 Harmon, Guam	Futures	Hard	(Japan) Takuto Niki	(South Korea) Seongchan Hong (South Korea) Cheong-Eui Kim	6–1, 6–7^{(4-7)}, [11-9]
Win	2–0	Aug 2022	M25 Sapporo, Japan	Futures	Hard	(Japan) Takuto Niki	(Japan) Rimpei Kawakami (Japan) Naoki Tajima	3–6, 6–4, [10–8]
Win	3–0	Jun 2023	M25 Anseong, South Korea	Futures	Clay	(South Korea) Chung Yun-seong	(Japan) Shunsuke Mitsui (Japan) Naoki Tajima	7–6^{(7–3)}, 6–4
Win	4–0	Sep 2023	M25 Sapporo, Japan	Futures	Hard	(Japan) Sho Katayama	(Canada) Chih Chi Huang (Japan) Yuta Kikuchi	6–4, 6–4
Win	5–0	Sep 2023	M25 Takasaki, Japan	Futures	Hard	(Japan) Seita Watanabe	(Japan) Taisei Ichikawa (Japan) Kazuma Kawachi	6–4, 2–6, [10-5]
Win	6–0	Apr 2024	M15 Kashiwa, Japan	Futures	Hard	(Japan) Masamichi Imamura	(Chinese Taipei) Ray Ho (South Korea) Nam Ji-sung	4–6, 6–2, [10-8]
Win	7–0	Apr 2024	Concepción, Chile	Challenger	Clay	(Japan) Seita Watanabe	(Australia) Patrick Harper (United Kingdom) David Stevenson	6–4, 7–6^{(8–6)}
Loss	7–1	Jul 2024	Zug, Switzerland	Challenger	Clay	(Japan) Seita Watanabe	(Austria) Jurij Rodionov (Ukraine) Volodomyr Uzhylovskyi	6–7^{(5-7)}, 6–7^{(5–7)}
Win	8–1	Aug 2024	Zhangjiagan, China	Challenger	Hard	(Japan) Kaichi Uchida	(Philippines) Francis Alcantara (Thailand) Pruchya Isaro	6–1, 7–5
Win	9–1	Nov 2024	Matsuyama, Japan	Challenger	Hard	(Japan) Seita Watanabe	(United States) Nicolas Moreno De Alboran (New Zealand) Rubin Statham	6–4, 6–3
Loss	9–2	Nov 2024	Kobe, Japan	Challenger	Hard	(Japan) Kaichi Uchida	(United States) Vasil Kirkov (Netherlands) Bart Stevens	6–7^{(7-9)}, 5–7
Loss	9–3	Mar 2025	Concepción, Chile	Challenger	Clay	(Japan) Seita Watanabe	(United States) Vasil Kirkov (Chile) Matias Soto	2–6, 4–6
Loss	9–4	Mar 2025	Campinas, Brazil	Challenger	Clay	(Japan) Seita Watanabe	(Argentina) Mariano Kestelboim (Argentina) Gonzalo Villanueva	2–6, 6–7^{(5-7)}
Not completed	–	Jul 2025	Zug, Switzerland	Challenger	Clay	(South Korea) Nam Ji-sung	(France) Geoffrey Blancaneaux (France) Harold Mayot	x–x, x–x
Loss	9–5	Aug 2025	Grodzisk Mazowiecki, Poland	Challenger	Hard	(South Korea) Nam Ji-sung	(Netherlands) Thijmen Loof (France) Arthur Reymond	4–6, 7–6^{(7–3)}, [14-16]
Loss	9–6	Jan 2026	Nonthaburi, Thailand	Challenger	Hard	(India) Anirudh Chandrasekar	(India) Sriram Balaji (Austria) Neil Oberleitner	3–6, 6–7^{(6–8)}
Win	10–6	Apr 2026	Busan, South Korea	Challenger	Hard	(India) Anirudh Chandrasekar	(Netherlands) Jean-Julien Rojer (United States) Theodore Winegar	4–6, 6–3, [10–7]
Loss	10–7	Apr 2026	Gwangju, South Korea	Challenger	Hard	(India) Anirudh Chandrasekar	(United States) Mac Kiger (United States) Reese Stalder	4–6, 7–6^{(9–7)}, [8–10]
Loss	10–8	Jun 2026	Birmingham, United Kingdom	Challenger	Grass	(India) Anirudh Chandrasekar	(United Kingdom) Ben Jones (United Kingdom) Joshua Paris	4–6, 6–7^{(4–7)}
Win	11–8	Oct 2026	Villena, Spain	Challenger	Hard	(United States) Benjamin Kittay	(Israel) Daniel Cukierman (Brazil) Fernando Romboli	6–4, 5–7, [10–7]
