= 2026 Zug Open =

- Date: 20 – 26 July
- Edition: 5th
- Surface: Clay
- Location: Zug, Switzerland

Champions

Singles
- (Brazil) Thiago Seyboth Wild

Doubles
- (Netherlands) Thijmen Loof / (Japan) Kaito Uesugi
- Zug Open

The 2026 Dialectic Zug Open was a professional tennis tournament played on outdoor clay courts. It was the fifth edition of the tournament and part of the 2026 ATP Challenger Tour. It took place in Zug, Switzerland between 20 and 26 July 2026.

== Singles main draw entrants ==
=== Seeds ===
Country	Player	Rank^{1}	Seed
HUN	Zsombor Piros	120	1
CHI	Tomás Barrios Vera	139	2
CZE	Zdeněk Kolář	153	3
ESP	Roberto Carballés Baena	165	4
ITA	Francesco Passaro	182	5
SUI	Jérôme Kym	186	6
~~BEL~~	~~Kimmer Coppejans~~	~~199~~	~~7~~
FRA	Harold Mayot	200	8

- ^{1} Rankings as of 13 July 2026.

=== Other entrants ===
The following players received wildcards into the singles main draw:

- (Switzerland) Henry Bernet
- (Switzerland) Dylan Dietrich
- (Switzerland) Marc-Andrea Hüsler

The following player received entry into the singles main draw through the Next Gen Accelerator programme:

- (France) Thomas Faurel

The following players received entry into the singles main draw as alternates:

- (Czech Republic) Martin Krumich
- (Germany) Max Hans Rehberg

The following players received entry from the qualifying draw:

- (Switzerland) Mika Brunold
- (Bulgaria) Alexander Donski
- (Slovakia) Norbert Gombos
- (United Kingdom) Anton Matusevich
- (Brazil) Thiago Monteiro
- (Switzerland) Dominic Stricker

The following player received entry as a lucky loser:

- (Argentina) Juan Bautista Torres

== Champions ==
=== Singles ===
- (Brazil) Thiago Seyboth Wild def. (Switzerland) Marc-Andrea Hüsler 6–4, 6–3.

=== Doubles ===
- (Netherlands) Thijmen Loof / (Japan) Kaito Uesugi def. (Czech Republic) Andrew Paulson / (Czech Republic) David Poljak 6–4, 6–2.
