= Troisdorf Challenger =

- 2023 Saturn Oil Open

Defunct tennis tournament
- Event name: Saturn Oil Open
- Location: Troisdorf, Germany
- Venue: TC Rot-Weiß Troisdorf e.V.
- Category: ATP Challenger Tour
- Surface: Red Clay
- Website: saturnoilopen.com

The Troisdorf Challenger, also known as the Saturn Oil Open for sponsorship reasons, was a professional tennis tournament played on clay courts. It was part of the Association of Tennis Professionals (ATP) Challenger Tour. It was held in Troisdorf, Germany in 2022 and in 2023.

== Past finals ==
=== Singles ===
Year	Champion	Runner-up	Score
2023	Ivan Gakhov	(Portugal) Frederico Ferreira Silva	6–2, 5–7, 6–3
2022	(Slovakia) Lukáš Klein	(Belgium) Zizou Bergs	6–2, 6–4

=== Doubles ===
Year	Champions	Runners-up	Score
2023	(Spain) Íñigo Cervantes (Spain) Oriol Roca Batalla	(France) Manuel Guinard (France) Grégoire Jacq	6–2, 7–6^{(7–1)}
2022	(Jamaica) Dustin Brown (United States) Evan King	(Germany) Hendrik Jebens (Poland) Piotr Matuszewski	6–4, 7–5
