= Volodymyr Uzhylovskyi =

Ukrainian tennis player (born 1988)

- Country (sports): Ukraine
- Born: 25 March 1988 (age 37) Kryvyi Rih, Ukraine
- Height: 1.96 m (6 ft 5 in)
- Plays: Right-handed (two-handed backhand)
- Prize money: $135,858

Singles
- Career record: 0–0
- Career titles: 2 ITF
- Highest ranking: No. 492 (29 April 2013)

Doubles
- Career record: 0–0
- Career titles: 1 Challenger, 41 ITF
- Highest ranking: No. 164 (27 August 2018)
- Current ranking: No. 484 (16 March 2026)
- Last updated on: 23 March 2026.

Volodymyr Uzhylovskyi (born 25 March 1988) is a Ukrainian tennis player.

Uzhylovskyi has a career high ATP singles ranking of No. 492 achieved on 29 April 2013 and a career high ATP doubles ranking of No. 164 achieved on 27 August 2018.

Uzhylovskyi has won one ATP Challenger doubles title at the 2024 Zug Open with Jurij Rodionov.
