= Lukáš Klein =

Slovak tennis player (born 1998)

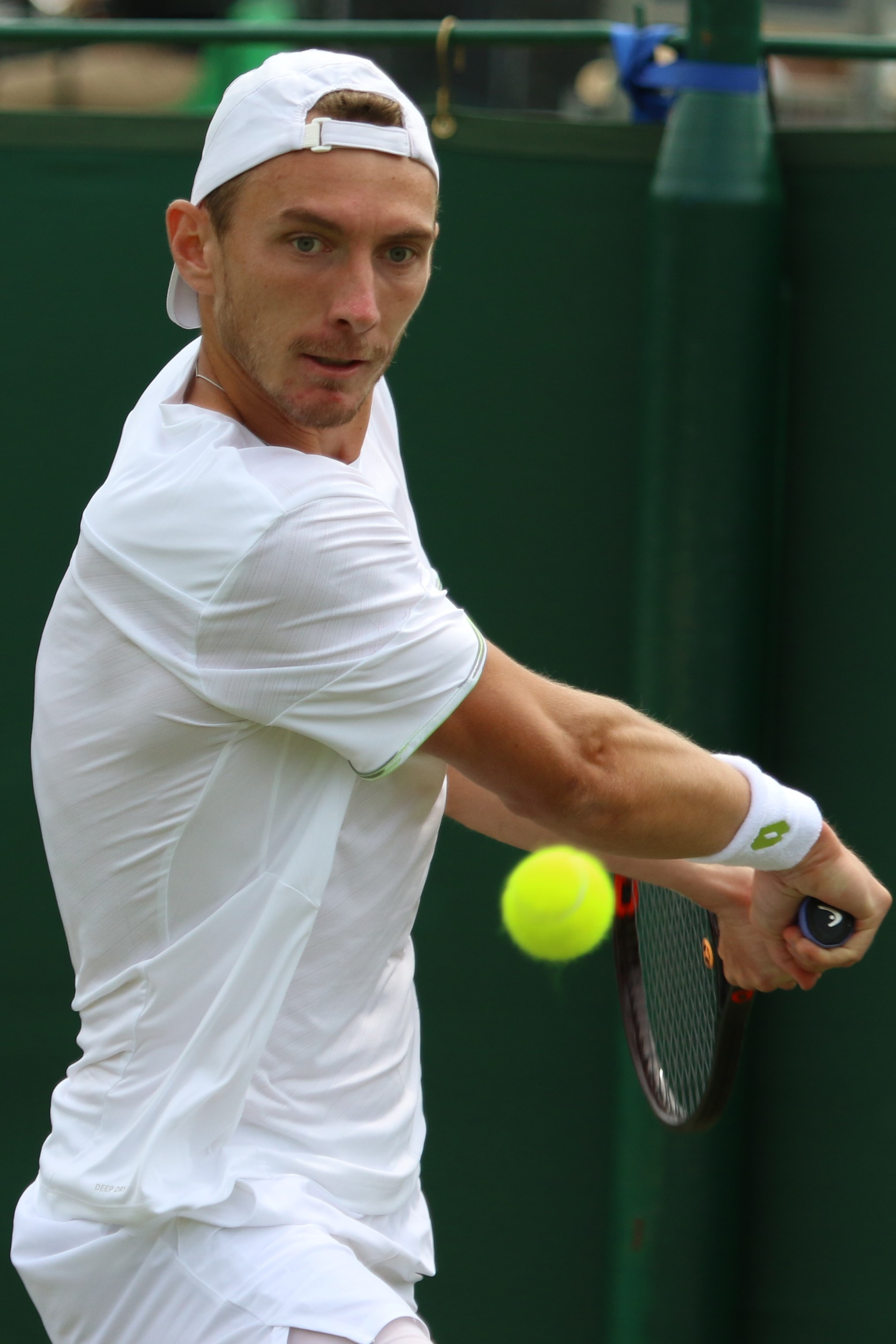
- Klein at the 2023 Wimbledon Championships
- Country (sports): Slovakia
- Residence: Spišská Nová Ves, Slovakia
- Born: 22 March 1998 (age 28) Spišská Nová Ves, Slovakia
- Height: 1.93 m (6 ft 4 in)
- Plays: Right-handed
- Coach: Karol Kučera
- Prize money: US $1,455,323

Singles
- Career record: 11–22
- Career titles: 0
- Highest ranking: No. 109 (5 August 2024)
- Current ranking: No. 833 (26 October 2026)

Grand Slam singles results
- Australian Open: 2R (2024)
- French Open: Q3 (2025)
- Wimbledon: 1R (2022)
- US Open: Q3 (2023)

Other tournaments
- Olympic Games: 1R (2021)

Doubles
- Career record: 6–8
- Career titles: 0
- Highest ranking: No. 240 (5 April 2021)

Other doubles tournaments
- Olympic Games: 2R (2021)

Team competitions
- Davis Cup: Singles: 1–6; Doubles: 4–6
- Last updated on: 26 October 2026.

Lukáš Klein (born 22 March 1998) is a Slovak professional tennis player. Klein has a career-high ATP singles ranking of world No. 109 achieved on 5 August 2024 and a career-high doubles ranking of No. 240 achieved on 5 April 2021. He is currently the No. 2 Slovak tennis player in singles.

Klein has reached 15 career singles finals, with a record of 9 wins and 6 losses, including 3 ATP Challenger titles. Additionally, he has reached 11 career doubles finals, with a record of 5 wins and 6 losses, including a 1–3 result in Challenger finals.

== Career ==
=== 2020–21: ATP & Top 250 & Olympics debuts ===
Klein won his first Challenger title at the 2021 Challenger La Manche with compatriot Alex Molčan 1–6, 7–5, [10–6].

Klein made his ATP main draw singles debut in March at the 2021 Argentina Open, where he defeated Andrea Collarini, Thiago Seyboth Wild and Ernesto Escobedo to qualify for the main draw. Klein then went on to upset compatriot Andrej Martin in straight sets. He would go on to lose in the second round to top seed, local favourite and eventual champion Diego Schwartzman in straight sets.

He reached the top 250 at World No. 248 in singles on 28 June 2021 after reaching the second round also as a qualifier at the 2021 Mallorca Championships by defeating 8th seed Dušan Lajović, for his second ATP win for the season and in his career.

At the Olympics, Klein was entered as an alternate for Matteo Berrettini, who had withdrawn due to a thigh injury. He also participated in the doubles event partnering Filip Polášek and reaching the second round.

=== 2022–23: First Challenger title, Top 150 ===
In May, he won his first Challenger at the 2022 Saturn Oil Open in Troisdorf, Germany as a qualifier without dropping a set.

He qualified for the 2022 Wimbledon Championships making his Grand Slam debut. He lost to wildcard Liam Broady in five sets.

In October 2022, he reached his second Challenger final in Alicante and won the title. As a result, he moved more than 40 positions up to a new career-high in the top 180 on 10 October 2022. Following his third final in Ortisei, Italy he moved 17 positions up into the top 150 at No. 146 on 31 October 2022.

He qualified for and reached back-to-back finals at the 2023 Sparkassen ATP Challenger in Ortisei, Italy. He won his third Challenger title defeating Maks Kaśnikowski.

=== 2024: First Major and Masters wins, Slovak No. 1 ===
In January 2024, he qualified for the 2024 Brisbane International and defeated sixth seed Sebastián Báez for his first ATP win of the season and only third in his career. Ranked No. 163, he qualified for the 2024 Australian Open making his debut at this tournament and recorded his first Major win over Kwon Soon-woo. In the next round, he took sixth seed Alexander Zverev to five sets before losing the match in a fifth set tiebreak.

He qualified for the 2024 BNP Paribas Open making his Masters debut and recorded his first win at this level over Nicolas Moreno de Alboran. As a result he moved to a new career high in the top 130 and became the Slovak No. 1 player. Next he qualified for another Masters, the 2024 Miami Open defeating Benoît Paire and Jakub Menšík. He lost to Alex Michelsen in the first round. As a result he reached the top 120 in the rankings at world No. 116 on 1 April 2024.

He qualified for his third Masters of the season at the 2024 Mutua Madrid Open and recorded his first win at the tournament and only second at this level, over fellow qualifier Pablo Llamas Ruiz before losing to 15th seed Tommy Paul.

=== 2025: Two Challenger titles, back to top 125 ===
In July, Klein claimed back-to-back Challenger titles. He first won the San Marino Open, defeating Dino Prižmić in the final. This was his first title in two years. He then won the Zug Open, defeating Harold Mayot in the final.

== Personal life ==
Klein is in a relationship with fellow professional tennis player Anna Karolína Schmiedlová and in May 2025 the couple announced she was pregnant with their first child.

== Performance timelines ==
Key
W	F	SF	QF	#R	RR	Q#	P#	DNQ	A	Z#	PO	G	S	B	NMS	NTI	P	NH

(W) winner; (F) finalist; (SF) semifinalist; (QF) quarterfinalist; (#R) rounds 4, 3, 2, 1; (RR) round-robin stage; (Q#) qualification round; (P#) preliminary round; (DNQ) did not qualify; (A) absent; (Z#) Davis/Fed Cup Zonal Group (with number indication) or (PO) play-off; (G) gold, (S) silver or (B) bronze Olympic/Paralympic medal; (NMS) not a Masters tournament; (NTI) not a Tier I tournament; (P) postponed; (NH) not held; (SR) strike rate (events won / competed); (W–L) win–loss record.
To avoid confusion and double counting, these charts are updated at the conclusion of a tournament or when the player's participation has ended.

=== Singles ===
Tournament	2020	2021	2022	2023	2024	2025	W–L	Win %
Grand Slam tournaments								
Australian Open	A	A	A	Q1	2R	1R	1–2	33%
French Open	A	A	A	Q2	Q1	Q3	0–0	–
Wimbledon	NH	A	1R	Q2	Q2	Q3	0–1	0%
US Open	A	A	A	Q3	Q1	Q1	0–0	–
Win–loss	0–0	0–0	0–1	0–0	1–1	0–1	1–3	25%
ATP Masters 1000 tournaments								
Indian Wells Masters	NH	A	A	A	2R	Q1	1–1	50%
Miami Open	NH	A	A	Q2	1R	Q1	0–1	0%
Monte-Carlo Masters	NH	A	A	A	A	A	0–0	–
Madrid Open	NH	A	A	Q1	2R	A	1–1	50%
Italian Open	A	A	A	A	A	A	0–0	–
Canadian Open	NH	A	A	A	A	A	0–0	–
Cincinnati Masters	A	A	A	A	A	A	0–0	–
Shanghai Masters	NH			A	A	A	0–0	–
Paris Masters	A	A	A	A	A		0–0	–
Win–loss	0–0	0–0	0–0	0–0	2–3	0–0	2–3	40%
Career statistics								
	2020	2021	2022	2023	2024	2025	Total	
Tournaments	0	3	1	1	9	2	16	
Titles / Finals	0 / 0	0 / 0	0 / 0	0 / 0	0 / 0	0 / 0	0 / 0	
Overall win–loss	0–0	2–4	0–1	0–3	9–11	0–2	11–21	34%
Year-end ranking			137	172	136	140		

== ATP Challenger and ITF Tour finals ==
=== Singles: 17 (11 titles, 6 runner-ups) ===
Legend ATP Challenger (5–2) ITF Futures (6–4)	Finals by surface Hard (6–2) Clay (5–3) Carpet (0–1)

Result	W–L	Date	Tournament	Tier	Surface	Opponent	Score
Loss	0–1	Aug 2017	Slovakia F2, Piešťany	Futures	Clay	(France) Grégoire Jacq	4–6, 6–3, 3–6
Loss	0–2	Aug 2017	Slovakia F3, Bratislava	Futures	Clay	(Slovakia) Filip Horansky	4–6, 4–6
Loss	0–3	Oct 2017	Czechia F7, Jablonec nad Nisou	Futures	Carpet	(Czech Republic) Patrik Rikl	4–6, 2–6
Win	1–3	Mar 2018	Egypt F9, Sharm El Sheikh	Futures	Hard	(Slovakia) Patrik Néma	2–6, 6–3, 6–3
Win	2–3	Mar 2019	M15 Sharm El Sheikh, Egypt	World Tennis Tour	Hard	(Italy) Jacopo Berrettini	6–4, 6–4
Win	3–3	Apr 2019	M15 Sharm El Sheikh, Egypt	World Tennis Tour	Hard	(Poland) Daniel Michalski	6–2, 6–3
Win	4–3	Apr 2019	M15 Sharm El Sheikh, Egypt	World Tennis Tour	Hard	(Switzerland) Jakub Paul	6–4, 6–3
Loss	4–4	Jun 2019	M25 Pardubice, Czechia	World Tennis Tour	Clay	(France) Manuel Guinard	4–6, 7–5, 6–7^{(6–8)}
Win	5–4	Jul 2019	M15 Piešťany, Slovakia	World Tennis Tour	Clay	(Hungary) Fabian Marozsan	6–1, 4–6, 6–1
Win	6–4	Sep 2019	M15 Bratislava, Slovakia	World Tennis Tour	Clay	(Russia) Kirill Kivattsev	7–6^{(7–3)}, 6–3
Win	7–4	May 2022	Troisdorf, Germany	Challenger	Clay	(Belgium) Zizou Bergs	6–1, 6–4
Win	8–4	Oct 2022	Alicante, Spain	Challenger	Hard	(Dominican Republic) Nick Hardt	6–3, 6–4
Loss	8–5	Oct 2022	Ortisei, Italy	Challenger	Hard (i)	(Croatia) Borna Gojo	6–7^{(4–7)}, 3–6
Loss	8–6	Sep 2023	Istanbul, Turkey	Challenger	Hard	(Bosnia and Herzegovina) Damir Džumhur	6–7^{(5–7)}, 3–6
Win	9–6	Oct 2023	Ortisei, Italy	Challenger	Hard (i)	(Poland) Maks Kaśnikowski	6–7^{(4–7)}, 7–6^{(7–4)}, 7–6^{(8–6)}
Win	10–6	Jul 2025	San Marino	Challenger	Clay	(Croatia) Dino Prizmic	6–3, 6–4
Win	11–6	Jul 2025	Zug, Switzerland	Challenger	Clay	(France) Harold Mayot	6–2, 6–7^{(4–7)}, 6–4

=== Doubles: 11 (5–6) ===
Legend ATP Challenger (1–3) ITF Futures (4–3)	Finals by surface Hard (3–2) Clay (1–3) Grass (0–0) Carpet (1–1)

Result	W–L	Date	Tournament	Tier	Surface	Partner	Opponents	Score
Win	1–0	Feb 2016	Turkey F6, Antalya	Futures	Hard	(Slovakia) Alex Molčan	(Ukraine) V. Alekseenko (Portugal) F. Ferreira Silva	7–6^{(9–7)}, 7–6^{(7–5)}
Win	2–0	Oct 2016	Czech Republic F8, Jablonec nad Nisou	Futures	Carpet	(Slovakia) Patrik Néma	(Czech Republic) Matěj Vocel (Czech Republic) Pavel Motl	6–1, 6–3
Loss	2–1	Oct 2016	Czech Republic F9, Opava	Futures	Carpet	(Slovakia) Patrik Néma	(Poland) P. Matuszewski (Poland) Grzegorz Panfil	1–6, 3–6
Win	3–1	Apr 2017	Greece F4, Heraklion	Futures	Hard	(Slovakia) Patrik Néma	(United States) H. Callahan (United States) Nicholas S.Hu	6–4, 6–2
Loss	3–2	Jul 2017	Slovakia F1, Trnava	Futures	Clay	(Slovakia) Patrik Néma	(Ukraine) P. Kekercheni (Ukraine) D. Kalenichenko	2–6, 7–5, [8–10]
Loss	3–3	Apr 2019	M15 Sharm El Sheikh, Egypt	World Tennis Tour	Hard	(Czech Republic) Marek Jaloviec	(Poland) Michal Dembek (Poland) Daniel Michalski	2–6, 6–3, [8–10]
Loss	3–4	Jun 2019	Bratislava, Slovakia	Challenger	Clay	(Slovakia) Alex Molčan	(Belgium) Joran Vliegen (Belgium) Sander Gillé	2–6, 5–7
Win	4–4	Sep 2020	M15 Jablonec, Czech Republic	World Tennis Tour	Clay	(Belarus) Uladzimir Ignatik	(Czech Republic) Filip Duda (Czech Republic) Petr Nouza	6–3, 7–6^{(7–4)}
Loss	4–5	Nov 2020	Bratislava, Slovakia	Challenger	Hard	(Slovakia) Alex Molčan	(Finland) Harri Heliövaara (Finland) Emil Ruusuvuori	4–6, 3–6
Win	5–5	Feb 2021	Cherbourg, France	Challenger	Hard	(Slovakia) Alex Molčan	(France) Albano Olivetti (France) Antoine Hoang	1–6, 7–5, [10–6]
Loss	5–6	Mar 2021	Zadar, Croatia	Challenger	Clay	(Slovakia) Alex Molčan	(Slovenia) Blaž Kavčič (Slovenia) Blaž Rola	6–2, 3–6, [3–10]

== Junior Grand Slam finals ==
=== Doubles: 1 (1 runner-up) ===
Result	Year	To	Surface	Partner	Opponent	Score
Runner-up	2016	Australian Open	Hard	(Czech Republic) Patrik Rikl	(Australia) Alex de Minaur (Australia) Blake Ellis	6–3, 5–7, [10–12]
