= Zug Open =

- 2026 Zug Open

ATP Challenger Tour
- Event name: Dialectic Zug Open
- Location: Zug, Switzerland
- Venue: Zug Tennis Club
- Category: ATP Challenger Tour 125
- Surface: Clay
- Prize money: €181,250 (2025)
- Website: website

The Dialectic Zug Open is a professional tennis tournament played on clay courts. It is currently part of the ATP Challenger Tour. It has been held in Zug, Switzerland since 2022.

== Past finals ==
=== Singles ===
Year	Champion	Runner-up	Score
2026	(Brazil) Thiago Seyboth Wild	(Switzerland) Marc-Andrea Hüsler	6–4, 6–3
2025	(Slovakia) Lukáš Klein	(France) Harold Mayot	6–2, 6–7^{(4–7)}, 6–4
2024	(Switzerland) Jérôme Kym	(Argentina) Román Andrés Burruchaga	6–4, 6–4
2023	(France) Arthur Rinderknech	(Belgium) Joris De Loore	3–6, 6–3, 6–4
2022	(Switzerland) Dominic Stricker	(Latvia) Ernests Gulbis	5–7, 6–1, 6–3

=== Doubles ===
Year	Champions	Runners-up	Score
2026	(Netherlands) Thijmen Loof (Japan) Kaito Uesugi	(Czech Republic) Andrew Paulson (Czech Republic) David Poljak	6–4, 6–2
2025	(France) Geoffrey Blancaneaux / (France) Harold Mayot vs (South Korea) Nam Ji-sung / (Japan) Takeru Yuzuki		not completed due to poor weather
2024	(Austria) Jurij Rodionov (Ukraine) Volodymyr Uzhylovskyi	(Japan) Seita Watanabe (Japan) Takeru Yuzuki	7–6^{(7–5)}, 7–6^{(7–5)}
2023	(France) Théo Arribagé (France) Luca Sanchez	(Turkey) Ergi Kırkın (Czech Republic) Dalibor Svrčina	6–3, 7–5
2022	(Czech Republic) Zdeněk Kolář (Czech Republic) Adam Pavlásek	(Poland) Karol Drzewiecki (Finland) Patrik Niklas-Salminen	6–3, 7–5
