= 2024 Copa Sevilla =

- Date: 2–7 September
- Edition: 26th
- Surface: Clay
- Location: Seville, Spain

Champions

Singles
- (Spain) Roberto Carballés Baena

Doubles
- (Czech Republic) Petr Nouza / (Czech Republic) Patrik Rikl
- Copa Sevilla

The 2024 Copa Sevilla was a professional tennis tournament played on clay courts. It was the 26th edition of the tournament which was part of the 2024 ATP Challenger Tour. It took place in Seville, Spain between 2 and 7 September 2024.

== Singles main-draw entrants ==
=== Seeds ===
Country	Player	Rank^{1}	Seed
ESP	Roberto Carballés Baena	55	1
ARG	Federico Coria	79	2
GER	Daniel Altmaier	89	3
ESP	Albert Ramos Viñolas	122	4
SUI	Alexander Ritschard	131	5
ESP	Oriol Roca Batalla	156	6
LTU	Vilius Gaubas	185	7
FRA	Calvin Hemery	201	8

- ^{1} Rankings are as of 26 August 2024.

=== Other entrants ===
The following players received wildcards into the singles main draw:

- (South Korea) Gerard Campaña Lee
- (Spain) David Jordà Sanchis
- (Spain) Iñaki Montes de la Torre

The following players received entry into the singles main draw as alternates:

- (Spain) Alberto Barroso Campos
- (Spain) Nikolás Sánchez Izquierdo

The following players received entry from the qualifying draw:

- (Spain) Nicolás Álvarez Varona
- (Italy) Raúl Brancaccio
- (France) Maxime Chazal
- (Netherlands) Guy den Ouden
- (Spain) Daniel Mérida
- (Spain) Alejo Sánchez Quílez

== Champions ==
=== Singles ===
- (Spain) Roberto Carballés Baena def. (Germany) Daniel Altmaier 6–3, 7–5.

=== Doubles ===
- (Czech Republic) Petr Nouza / (Czech Republic) Patrik Rikl def. (United States) George Goldhoff / (Brazil) Fernando Romboli 6–3, 6–2.
