= 2024 Stockholm Open =

Men's tennis tournament

- Date: 14–20 October
- Edition: 55th
- Category: ATP Tour 250 series
- Draw: 28S / 16D
- Prize money: €690,135
- Surface: Hard (indoor)
- Location: Stockholm, Sweden
- Venue: Kungliga tennishallen

Champions

Singles
- (United States) Tommy Paul

Doubles
- (Finland) Harri Heliövaara / (United Kingdom) Henry Patten
- Stockholm Open

The 2024 BNP Paribas Nordic Open was a professional men's tennis tournament played on indoor hard courts. It was the 55th edition of the tournament, and part of the ATP Tour 250 series of the 2024 ATP Tour. It took place at the Kungliga tennishallen in Stockholm, Sweden from 14 to 20 October 2024.

== Champions ==
=== Singles ===
- (United States) Tommy Paul def. (Bulgaria) Grigor Dimitrov, 6–4, 6–3

=== Doubles ===
- (Finland) Harri Heliövaara / (United Kingdom) Henry Patten def. (Czech Republic) Petr Nouza / (Czech Republic) Patrik Rikl, 7–5, 6–3

== Singles main-draw entrants ==
=== Seeds ===
Country	Player	Rank^{1}	Seed
	Andrey Rublev	6	1
NOR	Casper Ruud	9	2
BUL	Grigor Dimitrov	10	3
USA	Tommy Paul	13	4
CHI	Nicolás Jarry	29	5
USA	Brandon Nakashima	35	6
NED	Tallon Griekspoor	40	7
ITA	Luciano Darderi	42	8

- Rankings are as of 30 September 2024.

=== Other entrants ===
The following players received wildcards into the singles main draw:

- (Sweden) Leo Borg
- (Switzerland) Stan Wawrinka
- (Sweden) Elias Ymer

The following player received a late entry into the singles main draw:

- Andrey Rublev

The following player received entry using a protected ranking:

- (Switzerland) Dominic Stricker

The following players received entry from the qualifying draw:

- (Serbia) Laslo Djere
- (United Kingdom) Jacob Fearnley
- (Switzerland) Marc-Andrea Hüsler
- (Argentina) Thiago Agustín Tirante

=== Withdrawals ===
- (Belgium) David Goffin → replaced by (Switzerland) Dominic Stricker
- (Japan) Yoshihito Nishioka → replaced by (France) Alexandre Müller
- (Australia) Alexei Popyrin → replaced by (France) Quentin Halys

== Doubles main-draw entrants ==
=== Seeds ===
Country	Player	Country	Player	Rank^{1}	Seed
FIN	Harri Heliövaara	GBR	Henry Patten	31	1
MON	Hugo Nys	POL	Jan Zieliński	51	2
NED	Jean-Julien Rojer	GBR	Joe Salisbury	54	3
GBR	Julian Cash	GBR	Lloyd Glasspool	70	4

- Rankings are as of 30 September 2024

=== Other entrants ===
The following pairs received wildcards into the doubles main draw:

- (Sweden) Filip Bergevi / (Sweden) Erik Grevelius
- (Sweden) Leo Borg / (Sweden) Adam Heinonen

=== Withdrawals ===
- (Romania) Victor Vlad Cornea / (Ukraine) Denys Molchanov → replaced by (France) Jonathan Eysseric / (Ukraine) Denys Molchanov
- (United States) Austin Krajicek / (United States) Rajeev Ram → replaced by (Brazil) Marcelo Demoliner / (United States) Christian Harrison
