= 2025 UniCredit Czech Open =

- Date: 2 – 7 June
- Edition: 32nd
- Surface: Clay
- Location: Prostějov, Czech Republic
- Venue: TK Agrofert Prostějov

Champions

Singles
- (Bolivia) Hugo Dellien

Doubles
- (Czech Republic) Petr Nouza / (Czech Republic) Patrik Rikl
- Czech Open

The 2025 UniCredit Czech Open was a professional tennis tournament played on clay courts. It was the 32nd edition of the tournament which was part of the 2025 ATP Challenger Tour. It took place in Prostějov, Czech Republic between 2 and 7 June 2025.

== Singles main-draw entrants ==
=== Seeds ===
| Country | Player | Rank^{1} | Seed |
|---|---|---|---|
| CZE | Jakub Menšík | 19 | 1 |
| CHI | Alejandro Tabilo | 61 | 2 |
| CZE | Vít Kopřiva | 86 | 3 |
| BOL | Hugo Dellien | 90 | 4 |
| TPE | Tseng Chun-hsin | 94 | 5 |
| KAZ | Alexander Shevchenko | 103 | 6 |
| CZE | Dalibor Svrčina | 127 | 7 |
| HUN | Zsombor Piros | 160 | 8 |

- ^{1} Rankings are as of 26 May 2025.

=== Other entrants ===
The following players received wildcards into the singles main draw:

- (Czech Republic) Jakub Menšík
- (Czech Republic) Maxim Mrva
- (Chile) Alejandro Tabilo

The following player received entry into the singles main draw as an alternate:

- (Spain) Nikolás Sánchez Izquierdo

The following players received entry from the qualifying draw:

- (Czech Republic) Hynek Bartoň
- (Czech Republic) Petr Brunclík
- (Czech Republic) Jonáš Forejtek
- (Slovakia) Norbert Gombos
- (Slovakia) Miloš Karol
- (Slovakia) Lukáš Pokorný

== Champions ==
=== Singles ===
- (Bolivia) Hugo Dellien def. (Chinese Taipei) Tseng Chun-hsin 6–3, 6–4.

=== Doubles ===
- (Czech Republic) Petr Nouza / (Czech Republic) Patrik Rikl def. (Slovakia) Lukáš Pokorný / (Czech Republic) Dalibor Svrčina 4–6, 6–3, [10–4].
