= 2025 UniCredit Czech Open – Doubles =

Doubles
- 2025 UniCredit Czech Open

Final
- Champions: (Czech Republic) Petr Nouza (Czech Republic) Patrik Rikl
- Runners-up: (Slovakia) Lukáš Pokorný (Czech Republic) Dalibor Svrčina
- Score: 4–6, 6–3, [10–4]

Events
Singles	Doubles
- UniCredit Czech Open

Ivan Liutarevich and Sergio Martos Gornés were the defending champions but chose not to defend their title.

Petr Nouza and Patrik Rikl won the title after defeating Lukáš Pokorný and Dalibor Svrčina 4–6, 6–3, [10–4] in the final.

== Seeds ==
1. (India) Sriram Balaji / (Mexico) Miguel Ángel Reyes-Varela (first round)
2. (Czech Republic) Petr Nouza / (Czech Republic) Patrik Rikl (champions)
3. (France) Grégoire Jacq / (Germany) Andreas Mies (first round)
4. (Romania) Victor Vlad Cornea / (Poland) Karol Drzewiecki (first round)

== Draw ==
Key

- Q = Qualifier
- WC = Wild card
- LL = Lucky loser
- Alt = Alternate
- ITF = ITF entry
- PR = Protected ranking
- SR = Special ranking
- SE = Special exempt
- JE = Junior exempt
- JR = Junior Accelerator Programme entrant
- CO = College Accelerator Programme entrant
- NG = Next Gen Accelerator Program entrant
- w/o = Walkover
- r = Retired
- d = Defaulted

=== Draw ===
First round
1	(India) S Balaji (Mexico) M Reyes-Varela	4	6	[8]
(Peru) A Merino (Germany) C Negritu	6	2	[10]
(Chinese Taipei) R Ho (Spain) D Vega Hernández	6	4	[4]
(Slovakia) L Pokorný (Czech Republic) D Svrčina	1	6	[10]
3	(France) G Jacq (Germany) A Mies	6	3	[5]
(France) L Sanchez (Japan) S Watanabe	3	6	[10]
(Denmark) A Holmgren (Denmark) J Ingildsen	4	4
(Ukraine) D Molchanov (Ukraine) V Sachko	6	6
(Slovakia) M Karol (Austria) D Pichler	7^{7}	2	[7]
(Israel) D Cukierman (Poland) P Matuszewski	6^{5}	6	[10]
(India) A Chandrasekar (India) R Ramanathan	6	6
4	(Romania) V Cornea (Poland) K Drzewiecki	2	2
WC	(Czech Republic) J Jermář (Czech Republic) Jan Klimas	2	7^{7}	[5]
PR	(Czech Republic) A Paulson (Czech Republic) M Vocel	6	6^{5}	[10]
WC	(Czech Republic) M Mrva (Czech Republic) D Poljak	3	5
2	(Czech Republic) P Nouza (Czech Republic) P Rikl	6	7

Quarterfinals
(Peru) A Merino (Germany) C Negritu	6	3	[9]
(Slovakia) L Pokorný (Czech Republic) D Svrčina	3	6	[11]
(France) L Sanchez (Japan) S Watanabe	6^{2}	6	[6]
(Ukraine) D Molchanov (Ukraine) V Sachko	7^{7}	4	[10]
(Israel) D Cukierman (Poland) P Matuszewski	6^{4}	7	[10]
(India) A Chandrasekar (India) R Ramanathan	7^{7}	5	[2]
PR	(Czech Republic) A Paulson (Czech Republic) M Vocel	3	2
2	(Czech Republic) P Nouza (Czech Republic) P Rikl	6	6

Semifinals
(Slovakia) L Pokorný (Czech Republic) D Svrčina	7^{7}	6
(Ukraine) D Molchanov (Ukraine) V Sachko	6^{1}	3
(Israel) D Cukierman (Poland) P Matuszewski	3	3
2	(Czech Republic) P Nouza (Czech Republic) P Rikl	6	6

Final
(Slovakia) L Pokorný (Czech Republic) D Svrčina	6	3	[4]
2	(Czech Republic) P Nouza (Czech Republic) P Rikl	4	6	[10]
