= 2023 Advantage Cars Prague Open =

Tennis tournament in the Czech Republic

- Date: 1–7 May 2023
- Edition: 30th (men); 18th (women)
- Category: ATP Challenger Tour; ITF Women's World Tennis Tour
- Surface: Clay / Outdoor
- Location: Prague, Czech Republic

Champions

Men's singles
- (Switzerland) Dominic Stricker

Women's singles
- (Latvia) Darja Semeņistaja

Men's doubles
- (Czech Republic) Petr Nouza / (Czech Republic) Andrew Paulson

Women's doubles
- (Poland) Maja Chwalińska / (Czech Republic) Jesika Malečková
- I.ČLTK Prague Open

The 2023 Advantage Cars Prague Open was a tournament played on outdoor clay. It was the 30th edition for men and 18th for women, which were respectively part of the 2023 ATP Challenger Tour and the 2023 ITF Women's World Tennis Tour. It took place in Prague, Czech Republic, between 1 and 7 May 2023.

== Men's singles main draw entrants ==
=== Seeds ===
Country	Player	Rank^{1}	Seed
SRB	Filip Krajinović	79	1
MDA	Radu Albot	103	2
ARG	Juan Manuel Cerúndolo	104	3
FRA	Hugo Gaston	106	4
HUN	Zsombor Piros	118	5
CZE	Tomáš Macháč	123	6
SUI	Dominic Stricker	129	7
AUT	Sebastian Ofner	130	8

- ^{1} Rankings are as of 24 April 2023.

=== Other entrants ===
The following players received wildcards into the singles main draw:

- (North Macedonia) Kalin Ivanovski
- (Czech Republic) Andrew Paulson
- (Czech Republic) Dalibor Svrčina

The following players received entry into the singles main draw as special exempts:

- (Czech Republic) Zdeněk Kolář
- (Hungary) Máté Valkusz

The following player received entry into the singles main draw as an alternate:

- (Brazil) Felipe Meligeni Alves

The following players received entry from the qualifying draw:

- (United Kingdom) Jan Choinski
- (Argentina) Federico Delbonis
- (Italy) Federico Gaio
- (Bulgaria) Dimitar Kuzmanov
- (Spain) Pablo Llamas Ruiz
- (Ukraine) Vitaliy Sachko

== Women's singles main draw entrants ==
=== Seeds ===
Country	Player	Rank^{1}	Seed
HUN	Réka Luca Jani	131	1
AUS	Priscilla Hon	163	2
ITA	Nuria Brancaccio	170	3
ESP	Jéssica Bouzas Maneiro	182	4
MEX	Fernanda Contreras	189	5
CZE	Barbora Palicová	202	6
SUI	Céline Naef	210	7
LAT	Darja Semeņistaja	215	8

- ^{1} Rankings are as of 24 April 2023.

=== Other entrants ===
The following players received wildcards into the singles main draw:

- (Czech Republic) Victoria Bervid
- (Czech Republic) Lucie Havlíčková
- (Czech Republic) Dominika Šalková
- (Czech Republic) Tereza Valentová

The following player received entry using a special ranking:

- (Australia) Kaylah McPhee

The following player received entry as a special exempt:

- (Czech Republic) Nikola Bartůňková
- (Slovenia) Veronika Erjavec

The following player received entry as a junior exempt:

- (Switzerland) Céline Naef

The following players received entry from the qualifying draw:

- (Romania) Ilona Georgiana Ghioroaie
- (Netherlands) Jasmijn Gimbrère
- (Finland) Anastasia Kulikova
- (Slovakia) Katarína Kužmová
- (Czech Republic) Ivana Šebestová
- (Germany) Sarah-Rebecca Sekulic
- (Ukraine) Valeriya Strakhova
- (India) Karman Thandi

The following player received entry as a lucky loser:

- (Romania) Ilinca Amariei

== Champions ==
=== Men's singles ===
- (Switzerland) Dominic Stricker def. (Austria) Sebastian Ofner 7–6^{(9–7)}, 6–3.

=== Men's doubles ===
- (Czech Republic) Petr Nouza / (Czech Republic) Andrew Paulson def. (Czech Republic) Jiří Barnat / (Czech Republic) Jan Hrazdil 6–4, 6–3.

=== Women's singles ===
- (Latvia) Darja Semeņistaja def. (Spain) Jéssica Bouzas Maneiro, 2–6, 6–3, 6–4

=== Women's doubles ===
- (Poland) Maja Chwalińska / (Czech Republic) Jesika Malečková def. (Czech Republic) Aneta Kučmová / (Australia) Kaylah McPhee, 6–0, 7–6^{(7–5)}
