= 2025 Generali Open Kitzbühel – Doubles =

Doubles
- 2025 Generali Open Kitzbühel

Final
- Champions: (Czech Republic) Petr Nouza (Czech Republic) Patrik Rikl
- Runners-up: (Austria) Neil Oberleitner (Austria) Joel Schwärzler
- Score: 1–6, 7–6^{(7–3)}, [10–5]

Events
Singles	Doubles
← 2024 ·	Generali Open Kitzbühel	· 2026 →

Petr Nouza and Patrik Rikl defeated Neil Oberleitner and Joel Schwärzler in the final, 1–6, 7–6^{(7–3)}, [10–5] to win the doubles tennis title at the 2025 Generali Open Kitzbühel. It was the second ATP Tour title for both players.

Alexander Erler and Andreas Mies were the reigning champions, but Erler chose to compete in Washington instead, and Mies did not participate.

== Seeds ==
1. (Germany) Kevin Krawietz / (Germany) Tim Pütz (withdrew)
2. (Portugal) Francisco Cabral / (Austria) Lucas Miedler (semifinals)
3. (Mexico) Santiago González / (United States) Austin Krajicek (quarterfinals)
4. (Uruguay) Ariel Behar / (Belgium) Joran Vliegen (first round)

== Draw ==
=== Key ===
- Q = Qualifier
- WC = Wild card
- LL = Lucky loser
- Alt = Alternate
- ITF = ITF entry
- PR = Protected ranking
- SR = Special ranking
- SE = Special exempt
- JE = Junior exempt
- JR = Junior Accelerator Programme entrant
- CO = College Accelerator Programme entrant
- NG = Next Gen Accelerator Program entrant
- w/o = Walkover
- r = Retired
- d = Defaulted

=== Draw ===
First round
(Netherlands) J-J Rojer (Netherlands) B van de Zandschulp	3	3
WC	(Austria) N Oberleitner (Austria) J Schwärzler	6	6
3	(Mexico) S González (United States) A Krajicek	7^{7}	6
(Spain) P Martínez (Kazakhstan) A Shevchenko	6^{0}	3
(Germany) H Jebens (France) A Olivetti	7^{7}	6
(Poland) P Matuszewski (Australia) MC Romios	6^{5}	4
(Argentina) TM Etcheverry (Argentina) TA Tirante	6	6
WC	(Austria) N Hipfl (Switzerland) J Kym	3	2
(Czech Republic) P Nouza (Czech Republic) P Rikl	5	7^{7}	[10]
4	(Uruguay) A Behar (Belgium) J Vliegen	7	6^{4}	[8]
(Germany) J Schnaitter (Germany) M Wallner	6	6^{5}	[10]
(Colombia) N Barrientos (Mexico) M Reyes-Varela	4	7^{7}	[7]
(Germany) C Frantzen (Netherlands) R Haase	7^{9}	6^{5}	[8]
2	(Portugal) F Cabral (Austria) L Miedler	6^{7}	7^{7}	[10]

Quarterfinals
(India) S Balaji (India) RC Bollipalli	4	2
WC	(Austria) N Oberleitner (Austria) J Schwärzler	6	6
3	(Mexico) S González (United States) A Krajicek	1	6^{7}
(Germany) H Jebens (France) A Olivetti	6	7^{9}
(Argentina) TM Etcheverry (Argentina) TA Tirante
(Czech Republic) P Nouza (Czech Republic) P Rikl	w/o
(Germany) J Schnaitter (Germany) M Wallner	3	4
2	(Portugal) F Cabral (Austria) L Miedler	6	6

Semifinals
WC	(Austria) N Oberleitner (Austria) J Schwärzler	7	7^{8}
(Germany) H Jebens (France) A Olivetti	5	6^{6}
(Czech Republic) P Nouza (Czech Republic) P Rikl	7^{7}	6
2	(Portugal) F Cabral (Austria) L Miedler	6^{3}	3

Final
WC	(Austria) N Oberleitner (Austria) J Schwärzler	6	6^{3}	[5]
(Czech Republic) P Nouza (Czech Republic) P Rikl	3	7^{7}	[10]
