= 2023 Advantage Cars Prague Open – Women's doubles =

Women's doubles
- 2023 Advantage Cars Prague Open

Final
- Champions: (Poland) Maja Chwalińska (Czech Republic) Jesika Malečková
- Runners-up: (Czech Republic) Aneta Kučmová (Australia) Kaylah McPhee
- Score: 6–0, 7–6^{(7–5)}

Events
Singles	men	women
Doubles	men	women
- I.ČLTK Prague Open

Bárbara Gatica and Rebeca Pereira were the defending champions but Gatica was serving a suspension for match-fixing, whilst Pereira chose not to participate.

Maja Chwalińska and Jesika Malečková won the title, defeating Aneta Kučmová and Kaylah McPhee in the final, 6–0, 7–6^{(7–5)}.

== Seeds ==
1. (Slovenia) Veronika Erjavec / (Ukraine) Valeriya Strakhova (quarterfinals)
2. (Mexico) Fernanda Contreras / (Australia) Priscilla Hon (first round, retired)
3. Sofya Lansere / (Latvia) Darja Semeņistaja (quarterfinals)
4. (Poland) Maja Chwalińska / (Czech Republic) Jesika Malečková (champions)

== Draw ==
Key

- Q = Qualifier
- WC = Wild card
- LL = Lucky loser
- Alt = Alternate
- ITF = ITF entry
- PR = Protected ranking
- SR = Special ranking
- SE = Special exempt
- JE = Junior exempt
- JR = Junior Accelerator Programme entrant
- CO = College Accelerator Programme entrant
- NG = Next Gen Accelerator Program entrant
- w/o = Walkover
- r = Retired
- d = Defaulted

First round
(Czech Republic) A Kučmová (Australia) K McPhee	6	6
(Czech Republic) V Bervid (Czech Republic) A Šmejkalová	1	2
3	S Lansere (Latvia) D Semeņistaja	6	6
(Czech Republic) V Hažmuková (Czech Republic) D Pospíšilová	2	1
(Czech Republic) J Kareisová (Germany) J Vanik	2	0
(Romania) I Amariei (Czech Republic) A Laboutková	6	6
(Czech Republic) N Bartůňková (Czech Republic) B Palicová	6	6
(Germany) S-R Sekulic (Czech Republic) K Vlčková	1	3
(Czech Republic) D Hindová (Hungary) AK Tóth	4	4
4	(Poland) M Chwalińska (Czech Republic) J Malečková	6	6
(Czech Republic) L Havlíčková (Switzerland) C Naef	7^{16}	3	[7]
(United States) A Reami (Czech Republic) I Šebestová	6^{14}	6	[10]
(Romania) IG Ghioroaie (Romania) OG Simion	6	3
2	(Mexico) F Contreras (Australia) P Hon	2	0^{r}

Quarterfinals
1	(Slovenia) V Erjavec (Ukraine) V Strakhova	2	6	[6]
(Czech Republic) A Kučmová (Australia) K McPhee	6	3	[10]
3	S Lansere (Latvia) D Semeņistaja	2	6	[11]
(Romania) I Amariei (Czech Republic) A Laboutková	6	3	[13]
(Czech Republic) N Bartůňková (Czech Republic) B Palicová
4	(Poland) M Chwalińska (Czech Republic) J Malečková	w/o
(United States) A Reami (Czech Republic) I Šebestová	6	7^{7}
(Romania) IG Ghioroaie (Romania) OG Simion	1	6^{4}

Semifinals
(Czech Republic) A Kučmová (Australia) K McPhee	6	6
(Romania) I Amariei (Czech Republic) A Laboutková	3	2
4	(Poland) M Chwalińska (Czech Republic) J Malečková	6	6
(United States) A Reami (Czech Republic) I Šebestová	2	1

Final
(Czech Republic) A Kučmová (Australia) K McPhee	0	6^{5}
4	(Poland) M Chwalińska (Czech Republic) J Malečková	6	7^{7}
