= 2025 Grand Prix Hassan II – Singles =

Singles
- 2025 Grand Prix Hassan II

Final
- Champion: (Italy) Luciano Darderi
- Runner-up: (Netherlands) Tallon Griekspoor
- Score: 7–6^{(7–3)}, 7–6^{(7–4)}

Details
- Draw: 28 (4 Q / 3 WC )
- Seeds: 8

Events
Singles	Doubles
- Grand Prix Hassan II

Luciano Darderi defeated Tallon Griekspoor 7–6^{(7–3)}, 7–6^{(7–4)} in the final to win the singles title at the 2025 Grand Prix Hassan II. It was his second ATP Tour title.

Matteo Berrettini was the reigning champion, but did not participate this year.

== Seeds ==
The top four seeds received a bye into the second round.

1. (Netherlands) Tallon Griekspoor (final)
2. (Italy) Lorenzo Sonego (second round)
3. (France) Alexandre Müller (quarterfinals)
4. (Portugal) Nuno Borges (quarterfinals)
5. (Spain) Roberto Carballés Baena (semifinals)
6. (Spain) Jaume Munar (first round)
7. (Italy) Luciano Darderi (champion)
8. (Italy) Mattia Bellucci (quarterfinals)

== Draw ==
Key

- Q = Qualifier
- WC = Wild card
- LL = Lucky loser
- Alt = Alternate
- ITF = ITF entry
- PR = Protected ranking
- SR = Special ranking
- SE = Special exempt
- JE = Junior exempt
- JR = Junior Accelerator Programme entrant
- CO = College Accelerator Programme entrant
- NG = Next Gen Accelerator Program entrant
- w/o = Walkover
- r = Retired
- d = Defaulted

=== Finals ===
Semifinals
1	(Netherlands) Tallon Griekspoor	7	7^{7}
Q	(Poland) Kamil Majchrzak	5	6^{3}
5	(Spain) Roberto Carballés Baena	3	2
7	(Italy) Luciano Darderi	6	6

Final
1	(Netherlands) Tallon Griekspoor	6^{3}	6^{4}
7	(Italy) Luciano Darderi	7^{7}	7^{7}

=== Top half ===
First round
(Spain) P Carreño Busta	6	6
WC	(Morocco) Y Lalami Laaroussi	1	3
Q	(Argentina) F Coria	6	3	2
Q	(France) P-H Herbert	4	6	6
P Kotov	4	4
8	(Italy) M Bellucci	6	6
(Australia) A Vukic	5	6	5
(Bolivia) H Dellien	7	4	7
WC	(Morocco) E Benchetrit	5	1
(Netherlands) J de Jong	7	6
Q	(Poland) K Majchrzak	6	6
6	(Spain) J Munar	4	3

Second round
1	(Netherlands) T Griekspoor	7^{7}	3	6
(Spain) P Carreño Busta	6^{1}	6	3
Q	(France) P-H Herbert	2	5
8	(Italy) M Bellucci	6	7
3	(France) A Müller	6^{5}	6	6
(Bolivia) H Dellien	7^{7}	1	4
(Netherlands) J de Jong	6^{3}	1
Q	(Poland) K Majchrzak	7^{7}	6

Quarterfinals
1	(Netherlands) T Griekspoor	6	6
8	(Italy) M Bellucci	3	4
3	(France) A Müller	5	4
Q	(Poland) K Majchrzak	7	6

Semifinals
1	(Netherlands) T Griekspoor	7	7^{7}
Q	(Poland) K Majchrzak	5	6^{3}

=== Bottom half ===
First round
5	(Spain) R Carballés Baena	7^{7}	6
WC	(Morocco) T Baadi	6^{3}	3
(Germany) D Altmaier	2	6	6^{3}
(Finland) O Virtanen	6	4	7^{7}
(Italy) F Fognini	3	3
(Belgium) R Collignon	6	6
7	(Italy) L Darderi	6	6
(United States) T Boyer	4	4
Q	(Argentina) JM Cerúndolo	7	3	4
(France) H Gaston	5	6	6
(Czech Republic) V Kopřiva	2	6	6
PR	(Croatia) B Gojo	6	2	4

Second round
5	(Spain) R Carballés Baena	6	6
(Finland) O Virtanen	4	4
(Belgium) R Collignon	2	6	6^{0}
4	(Portugal) N Borges	6	3	7^{7}
7	(Italy) L Darderi	2	6	6
(France) H Gaston	6	2	3
(Czech Republic) V Kopřiva	6	5	6
2	(Italy) L Sonego	2	7	4

Quarterfinals
5	(Spain) R Carballés Baena	6	6
4	(Portugal) N Borges	4	4
7	(Italy) L Darderi	7	6
(Czech Republic) V Kopřiva	5	2

Semifinals
5	(Spain) R Carballés Baena	3	2
7	(Italy) L Darderi	6	6

== Qualifying ==
=== Seeds ===
1. (Poland) Kamil Majchrzak (qualified)
2. (Argentina) Federico Coria (qualified)
3. (Argentina) Juan Manuel Cerúndolo (qualified)
4. (France) Harold Mayot (qualifying competition)
5. (India) Sumit Nagal (qualifying competition)
6. (Germany) Dominik Koepfer (withdrew)
7. (France) Pierre-Hugues Herbert (qualified)
8. (Spain) Alejandro Moro Cañas (first round)

=== Qualifiers ===
1. (Poland) Kamil Majchrzak
2. (Argentina) Federico Coria
3. (Argentina) Juan Manuel Cerúndolo
4. (France) Pierre-Hugues Herbert

=== Qualifying draw ===
==== First qualifier ====
First round
1	(Poland) Kamil Majchrzak	6	6
(Argentina) Marco Trungelliti	4	3
WC	(Morocco) Amine Jamji	2	2
5	(India) Sumit Nagal	6	6

Qualifying competition
1	(Poland) Kamil Majchrzak	7	6
5	(India) Sumit Nagal	5	1

==== Second qualifier ====
First round
2	(Argentina) Federico Coria	6	2
PR	(Italy) Giulio Zeppieri	3	0^{r}
(France) Calvin Hemery	6	6
8	(Spain) Alejandro Moro Cañas	1	3

Qualifying competition
2	(Argentina) Federico Coria	6	6
(France) Calvin Hemery	4	2

==== Third qualifier ====
First round
3	(Argentina) Juan Manuel Cerúndolo	6	6
WC	(Morocco) Karim Bennani	0	2
(France) Titouan Droguet	7^{7}	6
Alt	(France) Manuel Guinard	6^{3}	3

Qualifying competition
3	(Argentina) Juan Manuel Cerúndolo	6	3	6
(France) Titouan Droguet	2	6	1

==== Fourth qualifier ====
First round
4	(France) Harold Mayot	6	3
Alt	Aslan Karatsev	4	0^{r}
(Portugal) Henrique Rocha	6	6^{2}	6^{1}
7	(France) Pierre-Hugues Herbert	4	7^{7}	7^{7}

Qualifying competition
4	(France) Harold Mayot	1	4
7	(France) Pierre-Hugues Herbert	6	6
