= 2023 Advantage Cars Prague Open – Women's singles =

Women's singles
- 2023 Advantage Cars Prague Open

Final
- Champion: (Latvia) Darja Semeņistaja
- Runner-up: (Spain) Jéssica Bouzas Maneiro
- Score: 2–6, 6–3, 6–4

Events
Singles	men	women
Doubles	men	women
- I.ČLTK Prague Open

Maja Chwalińska was the defending champion but lost to Anastasia Kulikova in the first round.

Darja Semeņistaja won the title, defeating Jéssica Bouzas Maneiro in the final, 2–6, 6–3, 6–4.

== Seeds ==
1. (Hungary) Réka Luca Jani (second round)
2. (Australia) Priscilla Hon (quarterfinals)
3. (Italy) Nuria Brancaccio (second round)
4. (Spain) Jéssica Bouzas Maneiro (final)
5. (Mexico) Fernanda Contreras (second round)
6. (Czech Republic) Barbora Palicová (first round)
7. (Switzerland) Céline Naef (second round)
8. (Latvia) Darja Semeņistaja (champion)

== Draw ==
Key

- Q = Qualifier
- WC = Wild card
- LL = Lucky loser
- Alt = Alternate
- ITF = ITF entry
- PR = Protected ranking
- SR = Special ranking
- SE = Special exempt
- JE = Junior exempt
- JR = Junior Accelerator Programme entrant
- CO = College Accelerator Programme entrant
- NG = Next Gen Accelerator Program entrant
- w/o = Walkover
- r = Retired
- d = Defaulted

=== Finals ===
Semifinals
8	(Latvia) Darja Semeņistaja	6	7^{7}
(Croatia) Tena Lukas	4	6^{2}
4	(Spain) Jéssica Bouzas Maneiro	6	6
SE	(Czech Republic) Nikola Bartůňková	0	3

Final
8	(Latvia) Darja Semeņistaja	2	6	6
4	(Spain) Jéssica Bouzas Maneiro	6	3	4

=== Top half ===
First round
1	(Hungary) RL Jani	7	4	6
Q	(Romania) IG Ghioroaie	5	6	1
Q	(Slovakia) K Kužmová	1	0
(Burundi) S Nahimana	6	6
Q	(Germany) S-R Sekulic	6^{2}	6	3
WC	(Czech Republic) T Valentová	7^{7}	1	6
WC	(Czech Republic) L Havlíčková	6	0	4
8	(Latvia) D Semeņistaja	4	6	6
3	(Italy) N Brancaccio	6	6^{3}	6
(Romania) M Bulgaru	3	7^{7}	4
Q	(Ukraine) V Strakhova	6^{7}	7	3
(Slovakia) R Šramková	7^{9}	5	6
(Croatia) T Lukas	6	6
(Romania) I Bara	2	1
(Turkey) İ Öz	3	0
7/JE	(Switzerland) C Naef	6	6

Second round
1	(Hungary) RL Jani	3	4
(Burundi) S Nahimana	6	6
WC	(Czech Republic) T Valentová	1	1
8	(Latvia) D Semeņistaja	6	6
3	(Italy) N Brancaccio	2	5
(Slovakia) R Šramková	6	7
(Croatia) T Lukas	6^{4}	6	6
7/JE	(Switzerland) C Naef	7^{7}	3	3

Quarterfinals
(Burundi) S Nahimana	4	1
8	(Latvia) D Semeņistaja	6	6
(Slovakia) R Šramková	2	2
(Croatia) T Lukas	6	6

Semifinals
8	(Latvia) D Semeņistaja	6	7^{7}
(Croatia) T Lukas	4	6^{2}

=== Bottom half ===
First round
6	(Czech Republic) B Palicová	4	3
WC	(Czech Republic) D Šalková	6	6
SE	(Slovenia) V Erjavec	6	5	3
LL	(Romania) I Amariei	2	7	6
Q	(Czech Republic) I Šebestová	0	3
Q	(India) K Thandi	6	6
Q	(Netherlands) J Gimbrère	2	6	1
4	(Spain) J Bouzas Maneiro	6	2	6
5	(Mexico) F Contreras	6	6^{3}	7^{7}
(United States) E Kalieva	3	7^{7}	6^{5}
SR	(Australia) K McPhee	4	6	2
SE	(Czech Republic) N Bartůňková	6	4	6
(Poland) M Chwalińska	5	3
Q	(Finland) A Kulikova	7	6
WC	(Czech Republic) V Bervid	0	3
2	(Australia) P Hon	6	6

Second round
WC	(Czech Republic) D Šalková	4	1
LL	(Romania) I Amariei	6	6
Q	(India) K Thandi	4	3
4	(Spain) J Bouzas Maneiro	6	6
5	(Mexico) F Contreras	7	2	4
SE	(Czech Republic) N Bartůňková	5	6	6
Q	(Finland) A Kulikova	4	4
2	(Australia) P Hon	6	6

Quarterfinals
LL	(Romania) I Amariei	3	2
4	(Spain) J Bouzas Maneiro	6	6
SE	(Czech Republic) N Bartůňková	6	6
2	(Australia) P Hon	3	4

Semifinals
4	(Spain) J Bouzas Maneiro	6	6
SE	(Czech Republic) N Bartůňková	0	3
