= 2023 Advantage Cars Prague Open – Men's singles =

Men's singles
- 2023 Advantage Cars Prague Open

Final
- Champion: (Switzerland) Dominic Stricker
- Runner-up: (Austria) Sebastian Ofner
- Score: 7–6^{(9–7)}, 6–3

Events
Singles	men	women
Doubles	men	women
- Advantage Cars Prague Open

Pedro Cachin was the defending champion but chose not to defend his title.

Dominic Stricker won the title after defeating Sebastian Ofner 7–6^{(9–7)}, 6–3 in the final.

== Seeds ==
1. (Serbia) Filip Krajinović (semifinals)
2. (Moldova) Radu Albot (first round)
3. (Argentina) Juan Manuel Cerúndolo (first round)
4. (France) Hugo Gaston (first round)
5. (Hungary) Zsombor Piros (first round, retired)
6. (Czech Republic) Tomáš Macháč (second round)
7. (Switzerland) Dominic Stricker (champion)
8. (Austria) Sebastian Ofner (final)

== Draw ==
Key

- Q = Qualifier
- WC = Wild card
- LL = Lucky loser
- Alt = Alternate
- ITF = ITF entry
- PR = Protected ranking
- SR = Special ranking
- SE = Special exempt
- JE = Junior exempt
- JR = Junior Accelerator Programme entrant
- CO = College Accelerator Programme entrant
- NG = Next Gen Accelerator Program entrant
- w/o = Walkover
- r = Retired
- d = Defaulted

=== Finals ===
Semifinals
1	(Serbia) Filip Krajinović	5	7	3
7	(Switzerland) Dominic Stricker	7	5	6
(Slovakia) Lukáš Klein	6^{4}	6	3
8	(Austria) Sebastian Ofner	7^{7}	0	6

Final
7	(Switzerland) Dominic Stricker	7^{9}	6
8	(Austria) Sebastian Ofner	6^{7}	3

=== Top half ===
First round
1	(Serbia) F Krajinović	6	4	6
Q	(United Kingdom) J Choinski	4	6	2
Q	(Italy) F Gaio	6	7^{7}
Q	(Bulgaria) D Kuzmanov	4	6^{5}
Q	(Argentina) F Delbonis	1	4
(Germany) D Koepfer	6	6
(Slovakia) N Gombos	2
5	(Hungary) Z Piros	2^{r}
3	(Argentina) JM Cerúndolo	3	1
WC	(Czech Republic) D Svrčina	6	6
(United Kingdom) R Peniston	6	5	1
WC	(Czech Republic) A Paulson	2	7	6
Alt	(Brazil) F Meligeni Alves	6	3
(Spain) P Martínez	2	0^{r}
WC	(North Macedonia) K Ivanovski	2	2
7	(Switzerland) D Stricker	6	6

Second round
1	(Serbia) F Krajinović	6	4	6
Q	(Italy) F Gaio	2	6	4
(Germany) D Koepfer	6	3	6
(Slovakia) N Gombos	2	6	3
WC	(Czech Republic) D Svrčina	6	3	6
WC	(Czech Republic) A Paulson	1	6	0
Alt	(Brazil) F Meligeni Alves	7^{7}	2	4
7	(Switzerland) D Stricker	6^{5}	6	6

Quarterfinals
1	(Serbia) F Krajinović	6	6
(Germany) D Koepfer	1	2
WC	(Czech Republic) D Svrčina	6	1	3
7	(Switzerland) D Stricker	4	6	6

Semifinals
1	(Serbia) F Krajinović	5	7	3
7	(Switzerland) D Stricker	7	5	6

=== Bottom half ===
First round
6	(Czech Republic) T Macháč	6	6
Q	(Spain) P Llamas Ruiz	1	1
(Switzerland) A Bellier	6	3	6^{5}
SE	(Czech Republic) Z Kolář	3	6	7^{7}
(Slovakia) L Klein	6	1	6
SE	(Hungary) M Valkusz	4	6	1
(Italy) F Agamenone	7	7
4	(France) H Gaston	5	5
8	(Austria) S Ofner	6	6^{5}	6
Y Demin	4	7^{7}	1
(Netherlands) J Sels	2	7^{7}	1
(Argentina) C Ugo Carabelli	6	6^{4}	6
Q	(Ukraine) V Sachko	7	5	2
(Czech Republic) V Kopřiva	5	7	6
(Chile) T Barrios Vera	6	6
2	(Moldova) R Albot	3	3

Second round
6	(Czech Republic) T Macháč	5	3
SE	(Czech Republic) Z Kolář	7	6
(Slovakia) L Klein	6	7^{8}
(Italy) F Agamenone	3	6^{6}
8	(Austria) S Ofner	6	6
(Argentina) C Ugo Carabelli	4	2
(Czech Republic) V Kopřiva	2	7	6^{7}
(Chile) T Barrios Vera	6	5	7^{9}

Quarterfinals
SE	(Czech Republic) Z Kolář	3	5
(Slovakia) L Klein	6	7
8	(Austria) S Ofner	6	7
(Chile) T Barrios Vera	2	5

Semifinals
(Slovakia) L Klein	6^{4}	6	3
8	(Austria) S Ofner	7^{7}	0	6
