= 2024 Stockholm Open – Singles =

Singles
- 2024 Stockholm Open

Final
- Champion: (United States) Tommy Paul
- Runner-up: (Bulgaria) Grigor Dimitrov
- Score: 6–4, 6–3

Details
- Draw: 28 (4 Q / 3 WC)
- Seeds: 8

Events
Singles	Doubles
- Stockholm Open

Tommy Paul defeated Grigor Dimitrov in the final, 6–4, 6–3 to win the singles tennis title at the 2024 Stockholm Open. He did not drop a set en route to his fourth ATP Tour title and second in Stockholm, after 2021.

Gaël Monfils was the reigning champion, but did not participate this year.

== Seeds ==
The top four seeds received a bye into the second round.

1. (Russia) Andrey Rublev (quarterfinals)
2. (Norway) Casper Ruud (quarterfinals)
3. (Bulgaria) Grigor Dimitrov (final)
4. (United States) Tommy Paul (champion)
5. (Chile) Nicolás Jarry (second round)
6. (United States) Brandon Nakashima (first round)
7. (Netherlands) Tallon Griekspoor (semifinals)
8. (Italy) Luciano Darderi (first round)

== Draw ==
Key

- Q = Qualifier
- WC = Wild card
- LL = Lucky loser
- Alt = Alternate
- ITF = ITF entry
- PR = Protected ranking
- SR = Special ranking
- SE = Special exempt
- JE = Junior exempt
- JR = Junior Accelerator Programme entrant
- CO = College Accelerator Programme entrant
- NG = Next Gen Accelerator Program entrant
- w/o = Walkover
- r = Retired
- d = Defaulted

=== Finals ===
Semifinals
WC	(Switzerland) Stan Wawrinka	3	2
4	(United States) Tommy Paul	6	6
3	(Bulgaria) Grigor Dimitrov	2	7	6
7	(Netherlands) Tallon Griekspoor	6	5	4

Final
4	(United States) Tommy Paul	6	6
3	(Bulgaria) Grigor Dimitrov	4	3

=== Top half ===
First round
WC	(Sweden) L Borg	3	6^{5}
(France) A Müller	6	7^{7}
(Spain) A Davidovich Fokina	7^{7}	6
Q	(Argentina) TA Tirante	6^{2}	2
WC	(Switzerland) S Wawrinka	6	6
6	(United States) B Nakashima	4	4
(Spain) P Martínez	2	0
Q	(Serbia) L Djere	6	6
(United Kingdom) C Norrie	4	4
(Serbia) M Kecmanović	6	6
WC	(Sweden) E Ymer	6	4	6^{7}
5	(Chile) N Jarry	2	6	7^{9}

Second round
1	A Rublev	6	6
(France) A Müller	4	1
(Spain) A Davidovich Fokina	4	6	5
WC	(Switzerland) S Wawrinka	6	3	7
4	(United States) T Paul	6	7^{7}
Q	(Serbia) L Djere	2	6^{2}
(Serbia) M Kecmanović	6	4	7^{7}
5	(Chile) N Jarry	4	6	6^{2}

Quarterfinals
1	A Rublev	6^{5}	6^{5}
WC	(Switzerland) S Wawrinka	7^{7}	7^{7}
4	(United States) T Paul	7^{11}	6
(Serbia) M Kecmanović	6^{9}	2

Semifinals
WC	(Switzerland) S Wawrinka	3	2
4	(United States) T Paul	6	6

=== Bottom half ===
First round
8	(Italy) L Darderi	4	3
(Italy) M Berrettini	6	6
(United States) A Kovacevic	4	7	4
PR	(Switzerland) D Stricker	6	5	6
(France) Q Halys	6	6
(India) S Nagal	0	4
7	(Netherlands) T Griekspoor	6	6
P Kotov	4	3
(France) C Moutet	2	6^{5}
Q	(United Kingdom) J Fearnley	6	7^{7}
Q	(Switzerland) M-A Hüsler	6^{1}	5
(Italy) L Sonego	7^{7}	7

Second round
(Italy) M Berrettini	6^{6}	4
PR	(Switzerland) D Stricker	7^{8}	6
(France) Q Halys	6^{1}	3
3	(Bulgaria) G Dimitrov	7^{7}	6
7	(Netherlands) T Griekspoor	7^{7}	6
Q	(United Kingdom) J Fearnley	6^{0}	3
(Italy) L Sonego	3	6^{3}
2	(Norway) C Ruud	6	7^{7}

Quarterfinals
PR	(Switzerland) D Stricker	3	2
3	(Bulgaria) G Dimitrov	6	6
7	(Netherlands) T Griekspoor	7	7^{7}
2	(Norway) C Ruud	5	6^{5}

Semifinals
3	(Bulgaria) G Dimitrov	2	7	6
7	(Netherlands) T Griekspoor	6	5	4

== Qualifying ==
=== Seeds ===
1. (United Kingdom) Jacob Fearnley (qualified)
2. (Switzerland) Alexander Ritschard (first round)
3. (Serbia) Laslo Djere (qualified)
4. (Slovakia) Lukáš Klein (first round)
5. (Argentina) Thiago Agustín Tirante (qualified)
6. (Poland) Kamil Majchrzak (qualifying competition)
7. (Switzerland) Marc-Andrea Hüsler (qualified)
8. (Serbia) Hamad Medjedovic (qualifying competition)

=== Qualifiers ===
1. (United Kingdom) Jacob Fearnley
2. (Argentina) Thiago Agustín Tirante
3. (Serbia) Laslo Djere
4. (Switzerland) Marc-Andrea Hüsler

=== Qualifying draw ===
==== First qualifier ====
First round
1	(United Kingdom) Jacob Fearnley	6	6
(Slovakia) Lukáš Pokorný	4	2
WC	(Sweden) Rafael Ymer	1	1
6	(Poland) Kamil Majchrzak	6	6

Qualifying competition
1	(United Kingdom) Jacob Fearnley	3	6	7^{7}
6	(Poland) Kamil Majchrzak	6	3	6^{2}

==== Second qualifier ====
First round
2	(Switzerland) Alexander Ritschard	6^{6}	4
(Denmark) August Holmgren	7^{8}	6
WC	(Sweden) Nikola Slavic	7^{7}	3	2
5	(Argentina) Thiago Agustín Tirante	6^{5}	6	6

Qualifying competition
(Denmark) August Holmgren	3	2
5	(Argentina) Thiago Agustín Tirante	6	6

==== Third qualifier ====
First round
3	(Serbia) Laslo Djere	6	3	6
(Bulgaria) Adrian Andreev	1	6	0
(France) Arthur Reymond	6^{4}	5
8	(Serbia) Hamad Medjedovic	7^{7}	7

Qualifying competition
3	(Serbia) Laslo Djere	6	6
8	(Serbia) Hamad Medjedovic	3	4

==== Fourth qualifier ====
First round
4	(Slovakia) Lukáš Klein	7^{7}	2	3
(Hungary) Zsombor Piros	6^{5}	6	6
Alt	(Sweden) Lucas Renard	0	0
7	(Switzerland) Marc-Andrea Hüsler	6	6

Qualifying competition
(Hungary) Zsombor Piros	2	2
7	(Switzerland) Marc-Andrea Hüsler	6	6
