= 2023 Advantage Cars Prague Open – Men's doubles =

Men's doubles
- 2023 Advantage Cars Prague Open

Final
- Champions: (Czech Republic) Petr Nouza (Czech Republic) Andrew Paulson
- Runners-up: (Czech Republic) Jiří Barnat (Czech Republic) Jan Hrazdil
- Score: 6–4, 6–3

Events
Singles	men	women
Doubles	men	women
- Advantage Cars Prague Open

Nuno Borges and Francisco Cabral were the defending champions but chose not to defend their title.

Petr Nouza and Andrew Paulson won the title after defeating Jiří Barnat and Jan Hrazdil 6–4, 6–3 in the final.

== Seeds ==
1. (Kazakhstan) Andrey Golubev / (Czech Republic) Roman Jebavý (first round)
2. (Argentina) Guido Andreozzi / (Argentina) Guillermo Durán (quarterfinals)
3. (Finland) Patrik Niklas-Salminen / (Netherlands) Bart Stevens (quarterfinals)
4. (Ukraine) Vladyslav Manafov / (Spain) Sergio Martos Gornés (quarterfinals)

== Draw ==
Key

- Q = Qualifier
- WC = Wild card
- LL = Lucky loser
- Alt = Alternate
- ITF = ITF entry
- PR = Protected ranking
- SR = Special ranking
- SE = Special exempt
- JE = Junior exempt
- JR = Junior Accelerator Programme entrant
- CO = College Accelerator Programme entrant
- NG = Next Gen Accelerator Program entrant
- w/o = Walkover
- r = Retired
- d = Defaulted

First round
1	(Kazakhstan) A Golubev (Czech Republic) R Jebavý	7^{7}	4	[6]
(Poland) K Drzewiecki (Poland) S Walków	6^{2}	6	[10]
(Czech Republic) P Nouza (Czech Republic) A Paulson	1	7^{7}	[10]
(Ukraine) D Molchanov (Brazil) F Romboli	6	6^{5}	[7]
3	(Finland) P Niklas-Salminen (Netherlands) B Stevens	5	6	[10]
WC	(Czech Republic) J Menšík (Czech Republic) D Svrčina	7	2	[4]
(Czech Republic) Z Kolář (Czech Republic) A Pavlásek	6	7^{8}
(Serbia) I Sabanov (Serbia) M Sabanov	0	6^{6}
WC	(Czech Republic) Jiří Barnat (Czech Republic) Jan Hrazdil	4	6	[10]
(Switzerland) L Margaroli (Netherlands) S Verbeek	6	3	[8]
(Sweden) F Bergevi (New Zealand) A Sitak	4	1
4	(Ukraine) V Manafov (Spain) S Martos Gornés	6	6
(Latvia) M Lībietis (United States) H Reese	6	3	[5]
Alt	(France) T Arribagé (France) H Gaston	4	6	[10]
(Czech Republic) M Gengel (Czech Republic) V Kopřiva	0	2
2	(Argentina) G Andreozzi (Argentina) G Durán	6	6

Quarterfinals
(Poland) K Drzewiecki (Poland) S Walków	6^{3}	7	[7]
(Czech Republic) P Nouza (Czech Republic) A Paulson	7^{7}	5	[10]
3	(Finland) P Niklas-Salminen (Netherlands) B Stevens	3	6	[2]
(Czech Republic) Z Kolář (Czech Republic) A Pavlásek	6	1	[10]
WC	(Czech Republic) J Barnat (Czech Republic) J Hrazdil	7	6
4	(Ukraine) V Manafov (Spain) S Martos Gornés	5	4
Alt	(France) T Arribagé (France) H Gaston	5	6	[11]
2	(Argentina) G Andreozzi (Argentina) G Durán	7	4	[9]

Semifinals
(Czech Republic) P Nouza (Czech Republic) A Paulson	7^{7}	4	[10]
(Czech Republic) Z Kolář (Czech Republic) A Pavlásek	6^{4}	6	[4]
WC	(Czech Republic) J Barnat (Czech Republic) J Hrazdil	6	3	[10]
Alt	(France) T Arribagé (France) H Gaston	4	6	[7]

Final
(Czech Republic) P Nouza (Czech Republic) A Paulson	6	6
WC	(Czech Republic) J Barnat (Czech Republic) J Hrazdil	4	3
