= 2025 Generali Open Kitzbühel =

- Date: 20–26 July
- Edition: 81st
- Category: ATP 250 series
- Surface: Clay / Outdoor
- Location: Kitzbühel, Austria
- Venue: Tennis Stadium Kitzbühel

Champions

Singles
- (Kazakhstan) Alexander Bublik

Doubles
- (Czech Republic) Petr Nouza / (Czech Republic) Patrik Rikl
- Generali Open Kitzbühel

The 2025 Generali Open Kitzbühel was a tennis tournament to be played on outdoor clay courts. It was the 81st edition of the tournament and part of the ATP 250 tournaments on the 2025 ATP Tour. It took place at the Tennis Stadium Kitzbühel in Kitzbühel, Austria, from 20 through 26 July 2025.

== Champions ==
=== Singles ===
- (Kazakhstan) Alexander Bublik def. (France) Arthur Cazaux, 6–4, 6–3

=== Doubles ===
- (Czech Republic) Petr Nouza / (Czech Republic) Patrik Rikl def. (Austria) Neil Oberleitner / (Austria) Joel Schwärzler, 1–6, 7–6^{(7–3)}, [10–5]

== Singles main draw entrants ==
=== Seeds ===
| Country | Player | Rank^{1} | Seed |
|---|---|---|---|
| KAZ | Alexander Bublik | 34 | 1 |
| ARG | Sebastián Báez | 37 | 2 |
| ESP | Pedro Martínez | 47 | 3 |
| ESP | Roberto Bautista Agut | 54 | 4 |
| ARG | Tomás Martín Etcheverry | 58 | 5 |
| FRA | Arthur Rinderknech | 64 | 6 |
| ARG | Francisco Comesaña | 74 | 7 |
| HUN | Márton Fucsovics | 89 | 8 |

- ^{1} Rankings are as of 14 July 2025.

=== Other entrants ===
The following players received wildcards into the main draw:

- (Chile) Nicolás Jarry
- (Austria) Lukas Neumayer
- (Austria) Joel Schwärzler

The following player received entry through the Next Gen Accelerator programme:

- (Germany) Justin Engel

The following players received entry as a special exempt:

- (Peru) Ignacio Buse
- (France) Arthur Cazaux

The following players received entry from the qualifying draw:

- (Argentina) Facundo Bagnis
- (Slovakia) Norbert Gombos
- (Germany) Yannick Hanfmann
- (Germany) Jan-Lennard Struff

=== Withdrawals ===
- (Italy) Matteo Berrettini → replaced by (Austria) Filip Misolic
- (Croatia) Marin Čilić → replaced by (Brazil) Thiago Seyboth Wild
- (Bolivia) Hugo Dellien → replaced by (Portugal) Jaime Faria
- (Serbia) Laslo Djere → replaced by (Austria) Sebastian Ofner
- (Finland) Otto Virtanen → replaced by (United States) Tristan Boyer

== Doubles main draw entrants ==
=== Seeds ===
| Country | Player | Country | Player | Rank^{1} | Seed |
|---|---|---|---|---|---|
| ~~GER~~ | ~~Kevin Krawietz~~ | ~~GER~~ | ~~Tim Pütz~~ | ~~15~~ | ~~1~~ |
| POR | Francisco Cabral | AUT | Lucas Miedler | 89 | 2 |
| MEX | Santiago González | USA | Austin Krajicek | 95 | 3 |
| URU | Ariel Behar | BEL | Joran Vliegen | 116 | 4 |

- ^{1} Rankings as of 14 July 2025.

=== Other entrants ===
The following pairs received wildcards into the doubles main draw:

- (Austria) Nico Hipfl / (Switzerland) Jérôme Kym
- (Austria) Neil Oberleitner / (Austria) Joel Schwärzler

=== Withdrawals ===
- (Bolivia) Hugo Dellien / (Argentina) Tomás Martín Etcheverry → replaced by (Argentina) Tomás Martín Etcheverry / (Argentina) Thiago Agustín Tirante
- (Germany) Kevin Krawietz / (Germany) Tim Pütz → no replacement
- (Netherlands) David Pel / (Netherlands) Jean-Julien Rojer → replaced by (Netherlands) Jean-Julien Rojer / (Netherlands) Botic van de Zandschulp
