= 2024 Stockholm Open – Doubles =

Doubles
- 2024 Stockholm Open

Final
- Champions: (Finland) Harri Heliövaara (United Kingdom) Henry Patten
- Runners-up: (Czech Republic) Petr Nouza (Czech Republic) Patrik Rikl
- Score: 7–5, 6–3

Events
Singles	Doubles
- Stockholm Open

Harri Heliövaara and Henry Patten won the doubles title at the 2024 Stockholm Open, defeating Petr Nouza and Patrik Rikl in the final, 7–5, 6–3.

Andrey Golubev and Denys Molchanov were the reigning champions, but Golubev did not participate this year. Molchanov partnered Jonathan Eysseric but lost in the first round to Heliövaara and Patten.

== Seeds ==
1. (Finland) Harri Heliövaara / (United Kingdom) Henry Patten (champions)
2. (Monaco) Hugo Nys / (Poland) Jan Zieliński (semifinals)
3. (Netherlands) Jean-Julien Rojer / (United Kingdom) Joe Salisbury (first round)
4. (United Kingdom) Julian Cash / (United Kingdom) Lloyd Glasspool (first round)

== Draw ==
Key

- Q = Qualifier
- WC = Wild card
- LL = Lucky loser
- Alt = Alternate
- ITF = ITF entry
- PR = Protected ranking
- SR = Special ranking
- SE = Special exempt
- JE = Junior exempt
- JR = Junior Accelerator Programme entrant
- CO = College Accelerator Programme entrant
- NG = Next Gen Accelerator Program entrant
- w/o = Walkover
- r = Retired
- d = Defaulted

=== Draw ===
First round
1	(Finland) H Heliövaara (United Kingdom) H Patten	6	6
(France) J Eysseric (Ukraine) D Molchanov	3	2
(Sweden) A Göransson (Netherlands) S Verbeek	7^{7}	6
(Brazil) R Matos (Brazil) M Melo	6^{3}	3
3	(Netherlands) J-J Rojer (United Kingdom) J Salisbury	6	4	[8]
(Germany) A Mies (Australia) J-P Smith	2	6	[10]
(Brazil) M Demoliner (United States) C Harrison	4	6^{3}
(Netherlands) T Griekspoor (Netherlands) B Stevens	6	7^{7}
(India) J Nedunchezhiyan (India) VS Prashanth	5	6	[10]
WC	(Sweden) F Bergevi (Sweden) E Grevelius	7	2	[5]
(Czech Republic) P Nouza (Czech Republic) P Rikl	6	2	[11]
4	(United Kingdom) J Cash (United Kingdom) L Glasspool	4	6	[9]
WC	(Sweden) L Borg (Sweden) A Heinonen	4	7^{13}	[9]
(Ecuador) G Escobar (Ecuador) D Hidalgo	6	6^{11}	[11]
(Italy) L Darderi (Italy) L Sonego	4	4
2	(Monaco) H Nys (Poland) J Zieliński	6	6

Quarterfinals
1	(Finland) H Heliövaara (United Kingdom) H Patten	6	6
(Sweden) A Göransson (Netherlands) S Verbeek	3	2
(Germany) A Mies (Australia) J-P Smith	4	2
(Netherlands) T Griekspoor (Netherlands) B Stevens	6	6
(India) J Nedunchezhiyan (India) VS Prashanth	4	4
(Czech Republic) P Nouza (Czech Republic) P Rikl	6	6
(Ecuador) G Escobar (Ecuador) D Hidalgo	6^{8}	7^{7}	[7]
2	(Monaco) H Nys (Poland) J Zieliński	7^{10}	6^{3}	[10]

Semifinals
1	(Finland) H Heliövaara (United Kingdom) H Patten	7	4	[10]
(Netherlands) T Griekspoor (Netherlands) B Stevens	5	6	[7]
(Czech Republic) P Nouza (Czech Republic) P Rikl	6	6
2	(Monaco) H Nys (Poland) J Zieliński	4	4

Final
1	(Finland) H Heliövaara (United Kingdom) H Patten	7	6
(Czech Republic) P Nouza (Czech Republic) P Rikl	5	3
