= 2025 Grand Prix Hassan II =

- Date: 31 March–6 April
- Edition: 39th
- Category: 250 series
- Draw: 28S / 16D
- Surface: Clay / outdoor
- Location: Marrakesh, Morocco
- Venue: Royal Tennis Club de Marrakech

Champions

Singles
- (Italy) Luciano Darderi

Doubles
- (Czech Republic) Petr Nouza / (Czech Republic) Patrik Rikl
- Grand Prix Hassan II

The 2025 Grand Prix Hassan II is a professional men's tennis tournament to be played in Marrakesh, Morocco on clay courts. It will be the 39th edition of the tournament and an ATP Tour 250 event on the 2025 ATP Tour. It will take place from 31 March until 6 April 2025.

== Champions ==
=== Singles ===
- (Italy) Luciano Darderi def. (Netherlands) Tallon Griekspoor 7–6^{(7–3)}, 7–6^{(7–4)}.

=== Doubles ===
- (Czech Republic) Petr Nouza / (Czech Republic) Patrik Rikl def. (Monaco) Hugo Nys / (France) Édouard Roger-Vasselin, 6–3, 6–4.

== Singles main draw entrants ==
=== Seeds ===
Country	Player	Rank^{†}	Seed
NED	Tallon Griekspoor	34	1
ITA	Lorenzo Sonego	38	2
FRA	Alexandre Müller	41	3
POR	Nuno Borges	42	4
ESP	Roberto Carballés Baena	53	5
ESP	Jaume Munar	56	6
ITA	Luciano Darderi	61	7
ITA	Mattia Bellucci	72	8

^{†} Rankings are as of 17 March 2025

=== Other entrants ===
The following players received wildcards into the singles main draw:

- (Morocco) Taha Baadi
- (Morocco) Elliot Benchetrit
- (Morocco) Younes Lalami Laaroussi

The following player received entry using a protected ranking:

- (Croatia) Borna Gojo

The following players received entry from the qualifying draw:

- (Argentina) Juan Manuel Cerúndolo
- (Argentina) Federico Coria
- (France) Pierre-Hugues Herbert
- (Poland) Kamil Majchrzak

=== Withdrawals ===
- (Belgium) Zizou Bergs → replaced by (Netherlands) Jesper de Jong
- (Portugal) Jaime Faria → replaced by (Finland) Otto Virtanen
- (France) Quentin Halys → replaced by (Czech Republic) Vít Kopřiva
- (Italy) Lorenzo Musetti → replaced by (Croatia) Borna Gojo
- (Italy) Francesco Passaro → replaced by (Spain) Pablo Carreño Busta
- (France) Arthur Rinderknech → replaced by (Italy) Fabio Fognini

== Doubles main draw entrants ==
=== Seeds ===
Country	Player	Country	Player	Rank^{1}	Seed
MON	Hugo Nys	FRA	Édouard Roger-Vasselin	64	1
URU	Ariel Behar	BEL	Joran Vliegen	86	2
AUT	Alexander Erler	GER	Constantin Frantzen	98	3
CRO	Ivan Dodig	TUN	Skander Mansouri	100	4

- Rankings are as of 17 March 2025

=== Other entrants ===
The following pairs received wildcards into the doubles main draw:

- (Morocco) Taha Baadi / (Morocco) Younes Lalami Laaroussi
- (Morocco) Elliot Benchetrit / (France) Pierre-Hugues Herbert

The following pair received entry as alternates:

- (United States) Tristan Boyer / (Finland) Otto Virtanen

=== Withdrawals ===
- (Belgium) Zizou Bergs / (Belgium) Raphaël Collignon → replaced by (Monaco) Romain Arneodo / (France) Manuel Guinard
- (United Kingdom) Julian Cash / (United Kingdom) Lloyd Glasspool → replaced by (Switzerland) Jakub Paul / (Netherlands) David Pel
- (Italy) Luciano Darderi / (Italy) Francesco Passaro → replaced by (United States) Tristan Boyer / (Finland) Otto Virtanen
- (France) Hugo Gaston / (France) Quentin Halys → replaced by (Italy) Mattia Bellucci / (France) Hugo Gaston
