= 2025 UniCredit Czech Open – Singles =

Singles
- 2025 UniCredit Czech Open

Final
- Champion: (Bolivia) Hugo Dellien
- Runner-up: (Chinese Taipei) Tseng Chun-hsin
- Score: 6–3, 6–4

Events
| Singles | Doubles |
- UniCredit Czech Open

Jérôme Kym was the defending champion but chose not to defend his title.

Hugo Dellien won the title after defeating Tseng Chun-hsin 6–3, 6–4 in the final.

== Seeds ==
1. (Czech Republic) Jakub Menšík (first round)
2. (Chile) Alejandro Tabilo (semifinals)
3. (Czech Republic) Vít Kopřiva (first round)
4. (Bolivia) Hugo Dellien (champion)
5. (Chinese Taipei) Tseng Chun-hsin (final)
6. (Kazakhstan) Alexander Shevchenko (quarterfinals)
7. (Czech Republic) Dalibor Svrčina (first round)
8. (Hungary) Zsombor Piros (quarterfinals)

== Draw ==
Key

- Q = Qualifier
- WC = Wild card
- LL = Lucky loser
- Alt = Alternate
- ITF = ITF entry
- PR = Protected ranking
- SR = Special ranking
- SE = Special exempt
- JE = Junior exempt
- JR = Junior Accelerator Programme entrant
- CO = College Accelerator Programme entrant
- NG = Next Gen Accelerator Program entrant
- w/o = Walkover
- r = Retired
- d = Defaulted

=== Finals ===
Semifinals
(Ukraine) Vitaliy Sachko | 1 | 4
4 | (Bolivia) Hugo Dellien | 6 | 6
5 | (Chinese Taipei) Tseng Chun-hsin | 6 | 6
2/WC | (Chile) Alejandro Tabilo | 4 | 1

Final
4 | (Bolivia) Hugo Dellien | 6 | 6
5 | (Chinese Taipei) Tseng Chun-hsin | 3 | 4

=== Top half ===
First round
1/WC | (Czech Republic) J Menšík | 4 | 6 | 5
(Ukraine) V Sachko | 6 | 1 | 7
Q | (Slovakia) M Karol | 6 | 5 | 7^{7}
(Slovakia) J Kovalík | 2 | 7 | 6^{0}
(Spain) A Moro Cañas | 6 | 4 | 7^{7}
(Italy) E Dalla Valle | 0 | 6 | 6^{4}
Q | (Czech Republic) Petr Brunclík | 6^{4} | 3
6 | (Kazakhstan) A Shevchenko | 7^{7} | 6
4 | (Bolivia) H Dellien | 7^{7} | 6
(France) M Martineau | 6^{5} | 4
WC | (Czech Republic) M Mrva | 6 | 6
Q | (Slovakia) L Pokorný | 3 | 4
(Bulgaria) D Kuzmanov | 6 | 6
(Spain) A Ramos Viñolas | 3 | 2
Q | (Slovakia) N Gombos | 6 | 6
7 | (Czech Republic) D Svrčina | 3 | 4

Second round
(Ukraine) V Sachko | 6 | 6
Q | (Slovakia) M Karol | 1 | 3
(Spain) A Moro Cañas | 2 | 2
6 | (Kazakhstan) A Shevchenko | 6 | 6
4 | (Bolivia) H Dellien | 6^{5} | 6 | 6
WC | (Czech Republic) M Mrva | 7^{7} | 2 | 4
(Bulgaria) D Kuzmanov | 7 | 7^{7}
Q | (Slovakia) N Gombos | 5 | 6^{1}

Quarterfinals
(Ukraine) V Sachko | 6 | 6
6 | (Kazakhstan) A Shevchenko | 2 | 1
4 | (Bolivia) H Dellien | 6 | 6
(Bulgaria) D Kuzmanov | 3 | 3

Semifinals
(Ukraine) V Sachko | 1 | 4
4 | (Bolivia) H Dellien | 6 | 6

=== Bottom half ===
First round
5 | (Chinese Taipei) C-h Tseng | 7^{7} | 6
(Paraguay) AD Vallejo | 6^{2} | 1
(France) L Van Assche | 6 | 6
(Jordan) A Shelbayh | 3 | 2
(Austria) J Rodionov | 6 | 6
(Chinese Taipei) Y-h Hsu | 4 | 4
(Austria) L Neumayer | 2 | 6 | 6
3 | (Czech Republic) V Kopřiva | 6 | 4 | 4
8 | (Hungary) Z Piros | 7^{8} | 6
Q | (Czech Republic) J Forejtek | 6^{6} | 1
(Romania) FC Jianu | 7 | 6^{4} | 6
Alt | (Spain) N Sánchez Izquierdo | 5 | 7^{7} | 4
(Slovakia) L Klein | 6 | 6
(Denmark) A Holmgren | 3 | 4
Q | (Czech Republic) H Bartoň | 7 | 4 | 1
2/WC | (Chile) A Tabilo | 5 | 6 | 6

Second round
5 | (Chinese Taipei) C-h Tseng | 6 | 7
(France) L Van Assche | 1 | 5
(Austria) J Rodionov | 6 | 6
(Austria) L Neumayer | 4 | 2
8 | (Hungary) Z Piros | 6 | 6
(Romania) FC Jianu | 3 | 4
(Slovakia) L Klein | 6^{4} | 3
2/WC | (Chile) A Tabilo | 7^{7} | 6

Quarterfinals
5 | (Chinese Taipei) C-h Tseng | 6 | 6
(Austria) J Rodionov | 4 | 4
8 | (Hungary) Z Piros | 6 | 4 | 0
2/WC | (Chile) A Tabilo | 1 | 6 | 6

Semifinals
5 | (Chinese Taipei) C-h Tseng | 6 | 6
2/WC | (Chile) A Tabilo | 4 | 1
