= 2024 Copa Sevilla – Singles =

Singles
- 2024 Copa Sevilla

Final
- Champion: (Spain) Roberto Carballés Baena
- Runner-up: (Germany) Daniel Altmaier
- Score: 6–3, 7–5

Events
Singles	Doubles
- Copa Sevilla

Roberto Carballés Baena was the defending champion and successfully defended his title after defeating Daniel Altmaier 6–3, 7–5 in the final.

== Seeds ==
1. (Spain) Roberto Carballés Baena (champion)
2. (Argentina) Federico Coria (second round)
3. (Germany) Daniel Altmaier (final)
4. (Spain) Albert Ramos Viñolas (quarterfinals)
5. (Switzerland) Alexander Ritschard (semifinals)
6. (Spain) Oriol Roca Batalla (quarterfinals)
7. (Lithuania) Vilius Gaubas (first round)
8. (France) Calvin Hemery (semifinals)

== Draw ==
Key

- Q = Qualifier
- WC = Wild card
- LL = Lucky loser
- Alt = Alternate
- ITF = ITF entry
- PR = Protected ranking
- SR = Special ranking
- SE = Special exempt
- JE = Junior exempt
- JR = Junior Accelerator Programme entrant
- CO = College Accelerator Programme entrant
- NG = Next Gen Accelerator Program entrant
- w/o = Walkover
- r = Retired
- d = Defaulted

=== Finals ===
Semifinals
1	(Spain) Roberto Carballés Baena	6	7^{7}
8	(France) Calvin Hemery	1	6^{4}
3	(Germany) Daniel Altmaier	7^{8}	6^{3}	7^{7}
5	(Switzerland) Alexander Ritschard	6^{6}	7^{7}	6^{4}

Final
1	(Spain) Roberto Carballés Baena	6	7
3	(Germany) Daniel Altmaier	3	5

=== Top half ===
First round
1	(Spain) R Carballés Baena	7	6
(Switzerland) R Bertola	5	2
(Portugal) G Elias	7	6
WC	(Spain) I Montes de la Torre	5	2
(Spain) C Taberner	3	6	4
(France) M Janvier	6	1	6
Q	(France) M Chazal	3	4
6	(Spain) O Roca Batalla	6	6
4	(Spain) A Ramos Viñolas	7	6
(France) G Blancaneaux	5	4
(Italy) E Dalla Valle	6	7^{7}
Alt	(Spain) N Sánchez Izquierdo	2	6^{1}
Q	(Spain) N Álvarez Varona	2	1^{r}
(Brazil) P Sakamoto	6	2
Alt	(Spain) A Barroso Campos	5	3
8	(France) C Hemery	7	6

Second round
1	(Spain) R Carballés Baena	7^{7}	6
(Portugal) G Elias	6^{3}	3
(France) M Janvier	4	4
6	(Spain) O Roca Batalla	6	6
4	(Spain) A Ramos Viñolas	7	6
(Italy) E Dalla Valle	5	2
(Brazil) P Sakamoto	4	1
8	(France) C Hemery	6	6

Quarterfinals
1	(Spain) R Carballés Baena	6	1	6
6	(Spain) O Roca Batalla	4	6	1
4	(Spain) A Ramos Viñolas	3	6^{4}
8	(France) C Hemery	6	7^{7}

Semifinals
1	(Spain) R Carballés Baena	6	7^{7}
8	(France) C Hemery	1	6^{4}

=== Bottom half ===
First round
7	(Lithuania) V Gaubas	3	6	4
(Argentina) S Rodríguez Taverna	6	3	6
Q	(Spain) A Sánchez Quílez	5	1
Q	(Italy) R Brancaccio	7	6
(Spain) J Barranco Cosano	6	6
(France) C Tabur	4	4
Q	(Netherlands) G den Ouden	6^{4}	6^{4}
3	(Germany) D Altmaier	7^{7}	7^{7}
5	(Switzerland) A Ritschard	7	6
(Argentina) P Cachín	5	4
Q	(Spain) D Mérida	5	6^{4}
(Italy) F Agamenone	7	7^{7}
WC	(Spain) D Jordà Sanchis	7	6
WC	(South Korea) G Campaña Lee	5	3
(Germany) S Fanselow	7^{9}	1	0
2	(Argentina) F Coria	6^{7}	6	6

Second round
(Argentina) S Rodríguez Taverna	6	6
Q	(Italy) R Brancaccio	3	2
(Spain) J Barranco Cosano	6^{6}	2
3	(Germany) D Altmaier	7^{8}	6
5	(Switzerland) A Ritschard	7^{7}	7
(Italy) F Agamenone	6^{2}	5
WC	(Spain) D Jordà Sanchis	6	6
2	(Argentina) F Coria	4	4

Quarterfinals
(Argentina) S Rodríguez Taverna	5	2
3	(Germany) D Altmaier	7	6
5	(Switzerland) A Ritschard	6	6
WC	(Spain) D Jordà Sanchis	4	4

Semifinals
3	(Germany) D Altmaier	7^{8}	6^{3}	7^{7}
5	(Switzerland) A Ritschard	6^{6}	7^{7}	6^{4}
