= 2025 Grand Prix Hassan II – Doubles =

Doubles
- 2025 Grand Prix Hassan II

Final
- Champions: (Czech Republic) Petr Nouza (Czech Republic) Patrik Rikl
- Runners-up: (Monaco) Hugo Nys (France) Édouard Roger-Vasselin
- Score: 6–3, 6–4

Events
Singles	Doubles
- Grand Prix Hassan II

Petr Nouza and Patrik Rikl defeated Hugo Nys and Édouard Roger-Vasselin in the final, 6–3, 6–4 to win the doubles tennis title at the 2025 Grand Prix Hassan II. It was the first ATP Tour title for both players.

Harri Heliövaara and Henry Patten were the reigning champions, but did not participate this year.

== Seeds ==
1. (Monaco) Hugo Nys / (France) Édouard Roger-Vasselin (final)
2. (Uruguay) Ariel Behar / (Belgium) Joran Vliegen (quarterfinals)
3. (Austria) Alexander Erler / (Germany) Constantin Frantzen (quarterfinals)
4. (Croatia) Ivan Dodig / (Tunisia) Skander Mansouri (first round)

== Draw ==
Key

- Q = Qualifier
- WC = Wild card
- LL = Lucky loser
- Alt = Alternate
- ITF = ITF entry
- PR = Protected ranking
- SR = Special ranking
- SE = Special exempt
- JE = Junior exempt
- JR = Junior Accelerator Programme entrant
- CO = College Accelerator Programme entrant
- NG = Next Gen Accelerator Program entrant
- w/o = Walkover
- r = Retired
- d = Defaulted

=== Draw ===
First round
1	(Monaco) H Nys (France) É Roger-Vasselin	6^{5}	6	[10]
(Argentina) G Andreozzi (France) T Arribagé	7^{7}	2	[6]
(Portugal) F Cabral (Austria) L Miedler	6^{4}	6	[6]
(Switzerland) J Paul (Netherlands) D Pel	7^{7}	1	[10]
4	(Croatia) I Dodig (Tunisia) S Mansouri	5	4
(Netherlands) T Griekspoor (Netherlands) B Stevens	7	6
WC	(Morocco) T Baadi (Morocco) Y Lalami Laaroussi	6^{4}	5
(Italy) M Bellucci (France) H Gaston	7^{7}	7
WC	(Morocco) E Benchetrit (France) P-H Herbert	4	6^{4}
(Czech Republic) P Nouza (Czech Republic) P Rikl	6	7^{7}
(France) J Eysseric (France) A Müller	3	4
3	(Austria) A Erler (Germany) C Frantzen	6	6
(Netherlands) S Arends (United Kingdom) L Johnson	5	6^{4}
(Monaco) R Arneodo (France) M Guinard	7	7^{7}
Alt	(United States) T Boyer (Finland) O Virtanen	4	4
2	(Uruguay) A Behar (Belgium) J Vliegen	6	6

Quarterfinals
1	(Monaco) H Nys (France) É Roger-Vasselin	6	6
(Switzerland) J Paul (Netherlands) D Pel	4	2
(Netherlands) T Griekspoor (Netherlands) B Stevens	6	7^{7}
(Italy) M Bellucci (France) H Gaston	4	6^{4}
(Czech Republic) P Nouza (Czech Republic) P Rikl	6	6
3	(Austria) A Erler (Germany) C Frantzen	4	2
(Monaco) R Arneodo (France) M Guinard	7^{7}	6
2	(Uruguay) A Behar (Belgium) J Vliegen	6^{5}	4

Semifinals
1	(Monaco) H Nys (France) É Roger-Vasselin	7	6
(Netherlands) T Griekspoor (Netherlands) B Stevens	5	1
(Czech Republic) P Nouza (Czech Republic) P Rikl	7	6
(Monaco) R Arneodo (France) M Guinard	5	4

Final
1	(Monaco) H Nys (France) É Roger-Vasselin	3	4
(Czech Republic) P Nouza (Czech Republic) P Rikl	6	6
