= 2025 Generali Open Kitzbühel – Singles =

Singles
- 2025 Generali Open Kitzbühel

Final
- Champion: (Kazakhstan) Alexander Bublik
- Runner-up: (France) Arthur Cazaux
- Score: 6–4, 6–3

Details
- Draw: 28 (4Q / 3WC)
- Seeds: 8

Events
Singles	Doubles
- Generali Open Kitzbühel

Alexander Bublik defeated Arthur Cazaux in the final, 6–4, 6–3 to win the singles tennis title at the 2025 Generali Open Kitzbühel. He did not drop a set en route to his seventh ATP Tour title and his second consecutive title in as many weeks, having also won in Gstaad the week before.

Matteo Berrettini was the reigning champion, but withdrew before the start of the tournament.

== Seeds ==
The top four seeds received a bye into the second round.

1. (Kazakhstan) Alexander Bublik (champion)
2. (Argentina) Sebastián Báez (second round)
3. (Spain) Pedro Martínez (second round)
4. (Spain) Roberto Bautista Agut (second round)
5. (Argentina) Tomás Martín Etcheverry (first round)
6. (France) Arthur Rinderknech (semifinals)
7. (Argentina) Francisco Comesaña (second round)
8. (Hungary) Márton Fucsovics (second round)

== Draw ==
Key

- Q = Qualifier
- WC = Wild card
- LL = Lucky loser
- Alt = Alternate
- ITF = ITF entry
- PR = Protected ranking
- SR = Special ranking
- SE = Special exempt
- JE = Junior exempt
- JR = Junior Accelerator Programme entrant
- CO = College Accelerator Programme entrant
- NG = Next Gen Accelerator Program entrant
- w/o = Walkover
- r = Retired
- d = Defaulted

=== Finals ===
Semifinals
1	(Kazakhstan) Alexander Bublik	6	6
(Netherlands) Botic van de Zandschulp	3	4
SE	(France) Arthur Cazaux	7	6
6	(France) Arthur Rinderknech	5	3

Final
1	(Kazakhstan) Alexander Bublik	6	6
SE	(France) Arthur Cazaux	4	3

=== Top half ===
First round
(Portugal) J Faria	2	2
(Argentina) TA Tirante	6	6
(Kazakhstan) A Shevchenko	2	6	6
(Colombia) DE Galán	6	3	4
WC	(Austria) J Schwärzler	2	6	3
8	(Hungary) M Fucsovics	6	2	6
(Brazil) T Seyboth Wild	7	6
NG	(Germany) J Engel	5	3
(Netherlands) B van de Zandschulp	6	4	6
WC	(Chile) N Jarry	4	6	3
(Austria) F Misolic	7	5	6
5	(Argentina) TM Etcheverry	5	7	3

Second round
1	(Kazakhstan) A Bublik	6	6
(Argentina) TA Tirante	3	4
(Kazakhstan) A Shevchenko	7	6
8	(Hungary) M Fucsovics	5	4
4	(Spain) R Bautista Agut	5	5
(Brazil) T Seyboth Wild	7	7
(Netherlands) B van de Zandschulp	6	7^{7}
(Austria) F Misolic	3	6^{4}

Quarterfinals
1	(Kazakhstan) A Bublik	6	6
(Kazakhstan) A Shevchenko	4	2
(Brazil) T Seyboth Wild	6^{2}	2
(Netherlands) B van de Zandschulp	7^{7}	6

Semifinals
1	(Kazakhstan) A Bublik	6	6
(Netherlands) B van de Zandschulp	3	4

=== Bottom half ===
First round
7	(Argentina) F Comesaña	6	7^{7}
(United States) T Boyer	3	6^{1}
SE	(France) A Cazaux	6	3	7
SE	(Peru) I Buse	3	6	5
(Austria) S Ofner	4	2
Q	(Germany) J-L Struff	6	6
6	(France) A Rinderknech	7^{7}	4	6
Q	(Argentina) F Bagnis	6^{4}	6	3
(France) H Gaston	3	4
Q	(Slovakia) N Gombos	6	6
Q	(Germany) Y Hanfmann	7	6
WC	(Austria) L Neumayer	5	2

Second round
7	(Argentina) F Comesaña	4	6^{7}
SE	(France) A Cazaux	6	7^{9}
Q	(Germany) J-L Struff	6	6
3	(Spain) P Martínez	2	2
6	(France) A Rinderknech	6^{3}	6	6
Q	(Slovakia) N Gombos	7^{7}	4	4
Q	(Germany) Y Hanfmann	5	6	7
2	(Argentina) S Báez	7	3	5

Quarterfinals
SE	(France) A Cazaux	6	6
Q	(Germany) J-L Struff	3	4
6	(France) A Rinderknech	6	3	6
Q	(Germany) Y Hanfmann	4	6	1

Semifinals
SE	(France) A Cazaux	7	6
6	(France) A Rinderknech	5	3

== Qualifying ==
=== Seeds ===
1. (Germany) Jan-Lennard Struff (qualified)
2. (Germany) Yannick Hanfmann (qualified)
3. (Spain) Martín Landaluce (first round)
4. (Brazil) Thiago Monteiro (qualifying competition)
5. (Switzerland) Jérôme Kym (first round)
6. (Portugal) Henrique Rocha (first round)
7. (Austria) Jurij Rodionov (qualifying competition)
8. (Bolivia) Juan Carlos Prado Ángelo (first round)

=== Qualifiers ===
1. (Germany) Jan-Lennard Struff
2. (Germany) Yannick Hanfmann
3. (Slovakia) Norbert Gombos
4. (Argentina) Facundo Bagnis

=== Qualifying draw ===
==== First qualifier ====
First round
1	(Germany) Jan-Lennard Struff	6	6
WC	(Austria) Nico Hipfl	3	2
WC	(Austria) Sandro Kopp	3	6^{3}
7	(Austria) Jurij Rodionov	6	7^{7}

Qualifying competition
1	(Germany) Jan-Lennard Struff	6	7^{7}
7	(Austria) Jurij Rodionov	3	6^{4}

==== Second qualifier ====
First round
2	(Germany) Yannick Hanfmann	6	7^{9}
(Spain) Albert Ramos Viñolas	1	6^{7}
Alt	(Slovakia) Andrej Martin	6	6
8	(Bolivia) Juan Carlos Prado Ángelo	1	4

Qualifying competition
2	(Germany) Yannick Hanfmann	6	6
Alt	(Slovakia) Andrej Martin	1	3

==== Third qualifier ====
First round
3	(Spain) Martín Landaluce	0	3
Alt	(Slovakia) Norbert Gombos	6	6
(Moldova) Radu Albot	2	7^{7}	6
5	(Switzerland) Jérôme Kym	6	6^{3}	3

Qualifying competition
Alt	(Slovakia) Norbert Gombos	6	6
(Moldova) Radu Albot	3	4

==== Fourth qualifier ====
First round
4	(Brazil) Thiago Monteiro	6	4	7^{7}
Alt	(Austria) Neil Oberleitner	4	6	6^{4}
PR	(Argentina) Facundo Bagnis	6	6
6	(Portugal) Henrique Rocha	4	3

Qualifying competition
4	(Brazil) Thiago Monteiro	1	4
PR	(Argentina) Facundo Bagnis	6	6
