= 2024 Copa Sevilla – Doubles =

Doubles
- 2024 Copa Sevilla

Final
- Champions: (Czech Republic) Petr Nouza (Czech Republic) Patrik Rikl
- Runners-up: (United States) George Goldhoff (Brazil) Fernando Romboli
- Score: 6–3, 6–2

Events
Singles	Doubles
- Copa Sevilla

Alberto Barroso Campos and Pedro Martínez were the defending champions but only Barroso Campos chose to defend his title, partnering Ryan Nijboer. They lost in the quarterfinals to Marco Bortolotti and Sergio Martos Gornés.

Petr Nouza and Patrik Rikl won the title after defeating George Goldhoff and Fernando Romboli 6–3, 6–2 in the final.

== Seeds ==
1. (Argentina) Guido Andreozzi / (India) Sriram Balaji (semifinals)
2. (Italy) Marco Bortolotti / (Spain) Sergio Martos Gornés (semifinals)
3. (Czech Republic) Petr Nouza / (Czech Republic) Patrik Rikl (champions)
4. (United States) George Goldhoff / (Brazil) Fernando Romboli (final)

== Draw ==
Key

- Q = Qualifier
- WC = Wild card
- LL = Lucky loser
- Alt = Alternate
- ITF = ITF entry
- PR = Protected ranking
- SR = Special ranking
- SE = Special exempt
- JE = Junior exempt
- JR = Junior Accelerator Programme entrant
- CO = College Accelerator Programme entrant
- NG = Next Gen Accelerator Program entrant
- w/o = Walkover
- r = Retired
- d = Defaulted

=== Draw ===
First round
1	(Argentina) G Andreozzi (India) S Balaji	6	6
(Switzerland) R Bertola (France) M Janvier	3	2
(Bulgaria) A Donski (Portugal) T Pereira	7^{7}	6
(Argentina) P Cachín (Argentina) F Coria	6^{5}	3
4	(United States) G Goldhoff (Brazil) F Romboli	6	7^{7}
(Germany) D Altmaier (Venezuela) LD Martínez	2	6^{4}
(France) C Hemery (Spain) D Jordà Sanchis	2	6	[8]
(Italy) F Agamenone (Argentina) S Rodríguez Taverna	6	3	[10]
WC	(Spain) D Marrero (Spain) I Montes de la Torre	6^{6}	4
(Spain) Í Cervantes (Spain) O Roca Batalla	7^{8}	6
(Spain) J Barranco Cosano (France) G Blancaneaux	3	3
3	(Czech Republic) P Nouza (Czech Republic) P Rikl	6	6
(Spain) A Barroso Campos (Netherlands) Ryan Nijboer	4	7^{7}	[10]
WC	(United States) Tennyson Whiting (Spain) B Winter López	6	6^{5}	[6]
(Italy) E Dalla Valle (Brazil) P Sakamoto	4	3
2	(Italy) M Bortolotti (Spain) S Martos Gornés	6	6

Quarterfinals
1	(Argentina) G Andreozzi (India) S Balaji	7^{7}	7^{7}
(Bulgaria) A Donski (Portugal) T Pereira	6^{4}	6^{4}
4	(United States) G Goldhoff (Brazil) F Romboli	6	6
(Italy) F Agamenone (Argentina) S Rodríguez Taverna	3	4
(Spain) Í Cervantes (Spain) O Roca Batalla	4	2
3	(Czech Republic) P Nouza (Czech Republic) P Rikl	6	6
(Spain) A Barroso Campos (Netherlands) R Nijboer	6^{1}	3
2	(Italy) M Bortolotti (Spain) S Martos Gornés	7^{7}	6

Semifinals
1	(Argentina) G Andreozzi (India) S Balaji	7^{8}	6^{2}	[6]
4	(United States) G Goldhoff (Brazil) F Romboli	6^{6}	7^{7}	[10]
3	(Czech Republic) P Nouza (Czech Republic) P Rikl	6	4	[10]
2	(Italy) M Bortolotti (Spain) S Martos Gornés	3	6	[4]

Final
4	(United States) G Goldhoff (Brazil) F Romboli	3	2
3	(Czech Republic) P Nouza (Czech Republic) P Rikl	6	6
