= Petr Nouza =

Czech tennis player (born 1998)

- Country (sports): Czech Republic
- Born: 9 September 1998 (age 28) Prague, Czech Republic
- Height: 1.93 m (6 ft 4 in)
- Plays: Right-handed (two-handed backhand)
- Coach: David Škoch
- Prize money: US $614,872

Singles
- Career record: 0-0
- Career titles: 0
- Highest ranking: No. 536 (5 August 2019)

Doubles
- Career record: 43–40
- Career titles: 3
- Highest ranking: No. 35 (28 September 2026)
- Current ranking: No. 35 (28 September 2026)

Grand Slam doubles results
- Australian Open: QF (2026)
- French Open: QF (2026)
- Wimbledon: 3R (2025, 2026)
- US Open: 2R (2026)
- Last updated on: 29 September 2026.

Petr Nouza (born 9 September 1998) is a Czech professional tennis player who specializes in doubles. He has a career high ATP doubles ranking of world No. 35 achieved on 28 September 2026 and a career high singles ranking of No. 536 achieved on 5 August 2019. Nouza has won three ATP Tour and 10 ATP Challenger doubles titles. He is the current No. 3 Czech ATP doubles player.

== Career ==
He won his maiden Challenger at the 2023 Oeiras Indoors with Victor Vlad Cornea.

He made his Grand Slam debuts in doubles at the 2024 Australian Open with Jiří Lehečka and at the 2024 French Open as an alternate pair with Luis David Martínez.

Partnering with Patrik Rikl, Nouza was runner-up in the doubles at the 2024 Stockholm Open, losing to top seeds Harri Heliövaara and Henry Patten in the final.

Partnering with Rikl, they made their Grand Slam debut as a team at the 2025 Australian Open.

At the 2025 Grand Prix Hassan II Nouza and Rikl defeated top seeds Hugo Nys and Édouard Roger-Vasselin in the final in straight sets to win their maiden ATP Tour title. In May, they made their debut as a team at the 2025 French Open and then at 2025 Wimbledon Championships where they reached the third round. They won their second title at the 2025 Generali Open Kitzbühel where they defeated Neil Oberleitner and Joel Schwärzler in the final.

== ATP Tour finals ==
=== Doubles: 4 (3 titles, 1 runner-up) ===
Legend Grand Slam (0–0) ATP Masters 1000 (0–0) ATP 500 Series (0–0) ATP 250 Series (3–1)	Finals by surface Hard (1–1) Clay (2–0) Grass (0–0)

Result	W–L	Date	Tournament	Tier	Surface	Partner	Opponents	Score
Loss	0–1	Oct 2024	Stockholm Open, Sweden	250 Series	Hard (i)	(Czech Republic) Patrik Rikl	(Finland) Harri Heliövaara (United Kingdom) Henry Patten	5–7, 3–6
Win	1–1	Apr 2025	Grand Prix Hassan II, Morocco	250 Series	Clay	(Czech Republic) Patrik Rikl	(Monaco) Hugo Nys (France) Édouard Roger-Vasselin	6–3, 6–4
Win	2–1	Jul 2025	Generali Open Kitzbühel, Austria	250 Series	Clay	(Czech Republic) Patrik Rikl	(Austria) Neil Oberleitner (Austria) Joel Schwärzler	1–6, 7–6^{(7–3)}, [10–5]
Win	3–1	Aug 2026	Winston-Salem Open, United States	250 Series	Hard	(Austria) Neil Oberleitner	(United States) Austin Krajicek (Croatia) Nikola Mektić	7–5, 6–4

== ATP Challenger Tour finals ==
=== Doubles titles (13) ===
Result	Date	Tournament	Category	Surface	Partner	Opponents	Score
Win	Jan 2023	Oeiras, Portugal	Challenger	Hard (i)	(Romania) Victor Vlad Cornea	(France) Jonathan Eysseric (France) Pierre-Hugues Herbert	6–3, 7–6^{(7–3)}
Win	May 2023	Prague, Czech Republic	Challenger	Clay	(Czech Republic) Andrew Paulson	(Czech Republic) Jiří Barnat (Czech Republic) Jan Hrazdil	6–4, 6–3
Win	May 2023	Skopje, North Macedonia	Challenger	Clay	(Czech Republic) Andrew Paulson	(India) Sriram Balaji (India) Jeevan Nedunchezhiyan	7–6^{(7–5)}, 6–3
Win	Jun 2023	Poznań, Poland	Challenger	Clay	(Poland) Karol Drzewiecki	(Uruguay) Ariel Behar (Czech Republic) Adam Pavlasek	7–6^{(7–2)}, 7–6^{(7–2)}
Win	Aug 2023	Liberec, Czech Republic	Challenger	Clay	(Czech Republic) Andrew Paulson	(Austria) Neil Oberleitner (Germany) Tim Sandkaulen	6–3, 6–4
Win	Aug 2023	Prague, Czech Republic	Challenger	Clay	(Czech Republic) Andrew Paulson	(Sweden) Filip Bergevi (Netherlands) Mick Veldheer	7–5, 6–3
Win	Feb 2024	Nottingham, United Kingdom	Challenger	Hard (i)	(Czech Republic) Patrik Rikl	(France) Antoine Escoffier (United Kingdom) Joshua Paris	6–3, 7–6^{(7–3)}
Win	Feb 2024	Tenerife, Spain	Challenger	Hard	(Czech Republic) Patrik Rikl	(Netherlands) Sander Arends (Netherlands) Sem Verbeek	6–4, 4–6, [11–9]
Win	Jul 2024	San Marino	Challenger	Clay	(Czech Republic) Patrik Rikl	(France) Theo Arribage (Brazil) Orlando Luz	1–6, 7–5, [10–6]
Win	Sep 2024	Seville, Spain	Challenger	Clay	(Czech Republic) Patrik Rikl	(United States) George Goldhoff (Brazil) Fernando Romboli	6–3, 6–2
Win	Sep 2024	Bad Waltersdorf, Austria	Challenger	Clay	(Czech Republic) Patrik Rikl	(Argentina) Guido Andreozzi (India) Sriram Balaji	6–4, 4–6, [10–5]
Win	Jun 2025	Prostějov, Czech Republic	Challenger	Clay	(Czech Republic) Patrik Rikl	(Slovakia) Lukáš Pokorný (Czech Republic) Dalibor Svrčina	4–6, 6–3, [10–4]
Win	May 2026	Bordeaux, France	Challenger	Clay	(Austria) Neil Oberleitner	(France) Arthur Reymond (France) Luca Sanchez	7–6^{(7–3)}, 6–7^{(3–7)}, [10–6]
