= Patrik Rikl =

Czech tennis player (born 1999)

- Country (sports): Czech Republic
- Residence: Prague, Czech Republic
- Born: 6 January 1999 (age 27) Bradenton, Florida, United States
- Height: 1.85 m (6 ft 1 in)
- Plays: Right-handed (two handed-backhand)
- Coach: Martin Štěpánek
- Prize money: US $489,247

Singles
- Career record: 0-0
- Career titles: 0
- Highest ranking: No. 392 (1 October 2018)

Doubles
- Career record: 46–33
- Career titles: 3
- Highest ranking: No. 29 (20 July 2026)
- Current ranking: No. 29 (20 July 2026)

Grand Slam doubles results
- Australian Open: QF (2026)
- French Open: 3R (2026)
- Wimbledon: 3R (2025, 2026)
- US Open: 2R (2026)
- Last updated on: 20 July 2026.

Patrik Rikl (born 6 January 1999) is a Czech tennis player who specializes in doubles. He has a career-high doubles ranking of No. 29 achieved on 20 July 2026 and a singles ranking of No. 392 achieved on 1 October 2018. Rikl has won two ATP Tour and five ATP Challenger doubles titles. He is the current No. 1 Czech ATP doubles player.

== Personal life ==
Rikl is the son of Czech former tennis player David Rikl.

== Career ==
=== Juniors ===
Rikl won the 2016 French Open boys' doubles title alongside Israeli Yshai Oliel. The pair defeated Chung Yun-seong and Orlando Luz in the final.

=== Professional ===
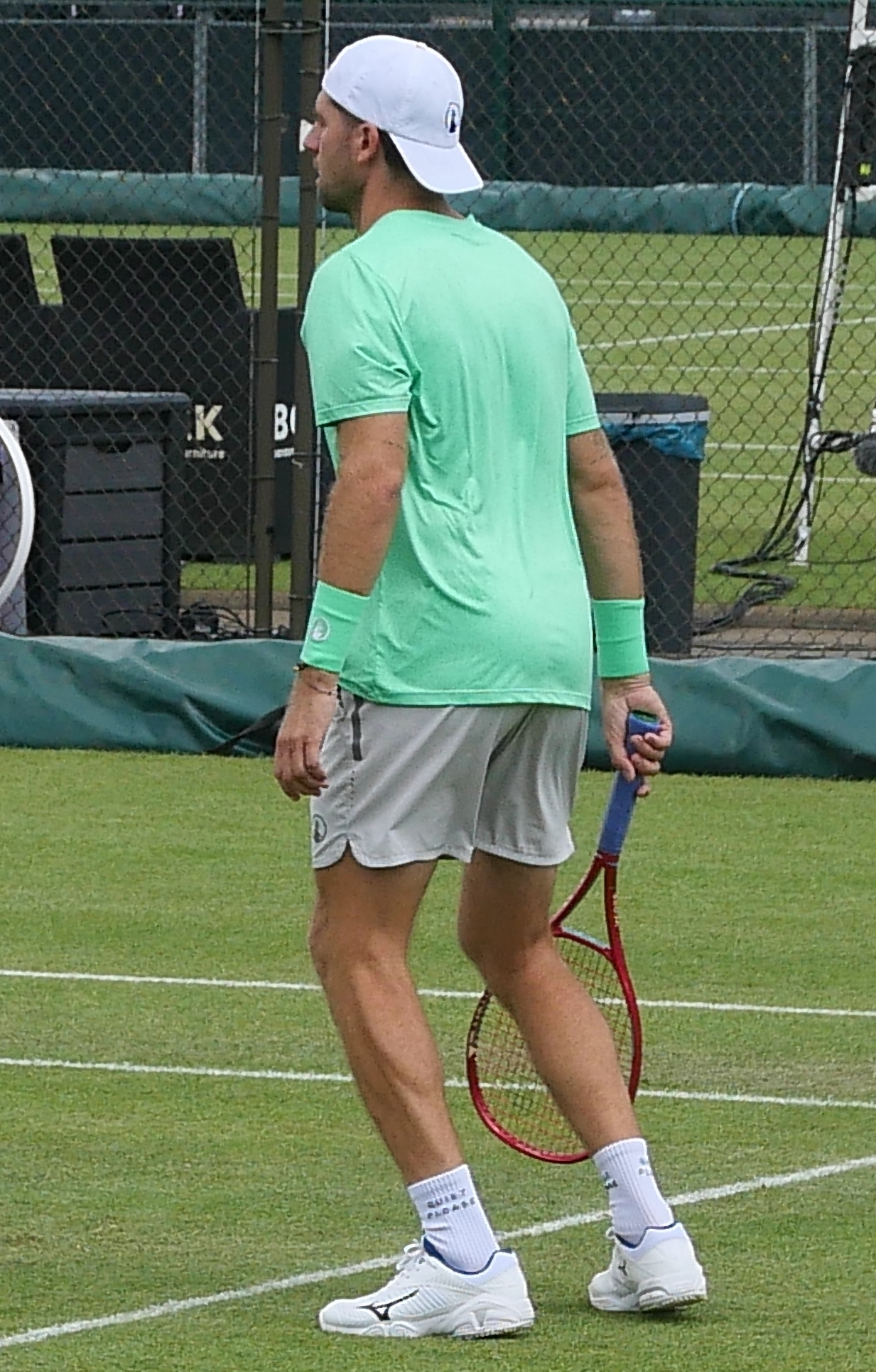
Rikl at the 2026 Libéma Open

Partnering with Petr Nouza, Rikl was runner-up in the doubles at the 2024 Stockholm Open, losing to top seeds Harri Heliövaara and Henry Patten in the final.

Rikl was nominated as part of Czech Team at 2025 United Cup, losing both mixed doubles matches alongside Gabriela Knutson. Partnering with Petr Nouza, Rikl made his Grand Slam debut at the 2025 Australian Open.

At the 2025 Grand Prix Hassan II Rikl and Nouza defeated top seeds Hugo Nys and Édouard Roger-Vasselin in the final in straight sets to win their maiden ATP Tour title. In May, he made his debut with Nouza at the 2025 French Open and then at 2025 Wimbledon Championships where they reached the third round. They won their second title at the 2025 Generali Open Kitzbühel where they defeated Neil Oberleitner and Joel Schwärzler in the final.

In July 2026, partnering with Adam Pavlásek, Rikl won his third ATP doubles title at the 2026 Croatia Open Umag by defeating David Stevenson and Marcus Willis in the final with a score of 6–3, 4–6, [10–6].

== Performance timelines ==
Key
W	F	SF	QF	#R	RR	Q#	P#	DNQ	A	Z#	PO	G	S	B	NMS	NTI	P	NH

(W) winner; (F) finalist; (SF) semifinalist; (QF) quarterfinalist; (#R) rounds 4, 3, 2, 1; (RR) round-robin stage; (Q#) qualification round; (P#) preliminary round; (DNQ) did not qualify; (A) absent; (Z#) Davis/Fed Cup Zonal Group (with number indication) or (PO) play-off; (G) gold, (S) silver or (B) bronze Olympic/Paralympic medal; (NMS) not a Masters tournament; (NTI) not a Tier I tournament; (P) postponed; (NH) not held; (SR) strike rate (events won / competed); (W–L) win–loss record.
To avoid confusion and double counting, these charts are updated at the conclusion of a tournament or when the player's participation has ended.

=== Doubles ===
Current through the 2026 US Open.

Tournament	2024	2025	2026	SR	W–L	Win %
Grand Slam tournaments
Australian Open	A	1R	QF	0 / 3	3–2	75%
French Open	A	1R	3R	0 / 2	2–2	75%
Wimbledon	A	3R	3R	0 / 3	4–2	50%
US Open	A	1R	2R	0 / 3	1–2	63%
Win–Loss	0–0	2–4	8–4	0 / 11	10–8	67%
National representation
Davis Cup						71%
Summer Olympics	A	Not Held		0 / 0	0–0	50%
ATP 1000 tournaments
Indian Wells Open	A	A	A	0 / 0	0–0	50%
Miami Open	A	A	1R	0 / 1	0–1	88%
Monte-Carlo Masters	A	A	A	0 / 0	0–0	–
Madrid Open	A	A	A	0 / 0	0–0	70%
Italian Open	A	A	1R	0 / 1	0–1	40%
Canadian Open	A	A	2R	0 / 1	1–1	67%
Cincinnati Open	A	A	2R	0 / 1	1–1	60%
Shanghai Masters	A	A		0 / 0	0–0	67%
Paris Masters	A	A		0 / 0	0–0	–
Win–Loss	0–0	0–0	2–4	0 / 4	2–4	65%
Career statistics
	2024	2025	2026	SR	W–L	Win %
Tournaments	3	18	19	Career total: 40		
Titles	0	2	1	Career total: 3		
Finals	1	2	2	Career total: 5		
Hard Win–Loss	3–2	8–11	9–9	0 / 22	20–22	65%
Clay Win–Loss	0–1	7–3	13–6	3 / 13	20–10	63%
Grass Win–Loss	0–0	3–2	6–3	0 / 5	9–5	44%
Overall Win–Loss	3–3	18–16	28–18	3 / 40	49–37	62%
Win %	44%	44%	44%	Career total: 62%		
Year-end ranking						

== ATP Tour finals ==
=== Doubles: 5 (3 titles, 2 runner-ups) ===
Legend ATP 250 (3–2)	Finals by surface Hard (0–1) Clay (3–1)

Result	W–L	Date	Tournament	Tier	Surface	Partner	Opponents	Score
Loss	0–1	Oct 2024	Stockholm Open, Sweden	ATP 250	Hard (i)	(Czech Republic) Petr Nouza	(Finland) Harri Heliövaara (United Kingdom) Henry Patten	5–7, 3–6
Win	1–1	Apr 2025	Grand Prix Hassan II, Morocco	ATP 250	Clay	(Czech Republic) Petr Nouza	(Monaco) Hugo Nys (France) Édouard Roger-Vasselin	6–3, 6–4
Win	2–1	Jul 2025	Generali Open Kitzbühel, Austria	ATP 250	Clay	(Czech Republic) Petr Nouza	(Austria) Neil Oberleitner (Austria) Joel Schwärzler	1–6, 7–6^{(7–3)}, [10–5]
Loss	2–2	Apr 2026	Țiriac Open, Romania	ATP 250	Clay	(Czech Republic) Adam Pavlásek	(France) Sadio Doumbia (France) Fabien Reboul	1–6, 4–6
Win	3–2	Jul 2026	Croatia Open, Croatia	ATP 250	Clay	(Czech Republic) Adam Pavlásek	(United Kingdom) David Stevenson (United Kingdom) Marcus Willis	6–3, 4–6, [10–6]

== ATP Challenger and ITF Tour finals ==
=== Singles: 9 (6–3) ===
Legend ATP Challenger Tour (0–0) ITF Futures (5–2)	Finals by surface Hard (1–0) Clay (3–2) Carpet (1–0)

Result	W–L	Date	Tournament	Tier	Surface	Opponent	Score
Win	1–0	Oct 2017	Czech Republic F7, Jablonec	Futures	Carpet	(Slovakia) Lukas Klein	6–4, 6–2
Win	2–0	Jun 2018	Czech Republic F3, Most	Futures	Clay	(Brazil) Bruno Sant'Anna	6–2, 3–6, 6–2
Win	3–0	Sep 2018	Thailand F2, Nonthaburi	Futures	Hard	(Uzbekistan) Sanjar Fayziev	6–2, 6–4
Loss	3–1	May 2019	M15 Prague, Czech Republic	World Tennis Tour	Clay	(Czech Republic) Vit Kopriva	2–6, 3–6
Win	4–1	May 2019	M25+H Jablonec, Czech Republic	World Tennis Tour	Clay	(Czech Republic) Jiří Lehečka	7–6^{(7–3)}, 6–3
Win	5–1	Jul 2021	M15 Antalya, Turkey	World Tennis Tour	Clay	(Romania) Nicolae Frunză	6–3, 3–6, 6–3
Loss	5–2	Jul 2021	M25 Velenje, Slovenia	World Tennis Tour	Clay	(Russia) Alexander Shevchenko	1–6, 2–6
Loss	5–3	Aug 2022	M25 Poznań, Poland	World Tennis Tour	Clay	(Argentina) Valerio Aboian	3–6, 4–6
Win	6–3	Jun 2023	M25 Poprad, Czech Republic	World Tennis Tour	Clay	(Czech Republic) Andrew Paulson	3–6, 7–6^{(7–5)}, 6–4

=== Doubles: 29 (15–14) ===
Legend ATP Challenger (5–6) ITF Futures (10–8)	Finals by surface Hard (7–1) Clay (8–11) Grass (0–0) Carpet (0–2)

Result	W–L	Date	Tournament	Tier	Surface	Partner	Opponents	Score
Loss	0–1	Dec 2015	Czech Republic F8, Opava	Futures	Carpet	(Czech Republic) Matěj Vocel	(Czech Republic) Filip Dolezel (Czech Republic) Petr Michnev	1–6, 4–6
Loss	0–2	Sep 2017	Hungary F8, Opava	Futures	Clay	(Czech Republic) Ondrej Krstev	(Japan) Sora Fukuda (Ukraine) Danylo Kalenichenko	4–6, 4–6
Loss	0–3	Jan 2018	Turkey F1, Antalya	Futures	Hard	(Czech Republic) Michal Konecny	(Turkey) Altuğ Çelikbilek (Germany) Jakob Sude	6–7^{(4–7)}, 6–2, [4–10]
Loss	0–4	May 2018	Czech Republic F2, Jablonec	Futures	Clay	(Czech Republic) Petr Nouza	(Czech Republic) Filip Duda (Czech Republic) Michael Vrbenský	3–6, 6–4, [5–10]
Win	1–4	Jun 2018	Czech Republic F3, Most	Futures	Clay	(Czech Republic) Petr Michnev	(Czech Republic) Tomáš Macháč (Czech Republic) Michael Vrbenský	6–2, 2–6, [10–7]
Win	2–4	Jul 2018	Czech Republic F5, Ústí nad Orlicí	Futures	Clay	(Slovakia) Filip Polášek	(Czech Republic) Tomáš Macháč (Czech Republic) Antonin Bolardt	7–6^{(7–2)}, 7–6^{(7–5)}
Loss	2–5	Jul 2018	Czech Republic F6, Brno	Futures	Clay	(Slovakia) Filip Polášek	(Czech Republic) Petr Nouza (Czech Republic) David Škoch	3–6, 6–2, [12–14]
Loss	2–6	Aug 2018	Liberec, Czech Republic	Challenger	Clay	(Slovakia) Filip Polášek	(Belgium) Sander Gillé (Belgium) Joran Vliegen	3–6, 4–6
Win	3–6	Mar 2020	M15 Trnava, Slovakia	World Tennis Tour	Hard	(Czech Republic) Jan Šátral	(Germany) Kai Lemstra (Germany) Christoph Negritu	6–3, 6–4
Win	4–6	Feb 2021	M15 St. Petersburg, Russia	World Tennis Tour	Hard	(Czech Republic) Andrew Paulson	(Moldova) Alexander Cozbinov (Ukraine) Marat Deviatiarov	4–6, 6–4, [10–8]
Win	5–6	Feb 2021	M15 St. Petersburg, Russia	World Tennis Tour	Hard	(Czech Republic) Andrew Paulson	(Russia) Artem Dubrivnyy (Russia) Alexey Zakharov	3–6, 7–6^{(7–5)}, [10–2]
Loss	5–7	May 2021	Ostrava, Czech Republic	Challenger	Clay	(Czech Republic) Andrew Paulson	(Australia) Marc Polmans (Ukraine) Sergiy Stakhovsky	6–7^{(4–7)}, 6–3, [7–10]
Loss	5–8	May 2021	M25 Prague, Czech Republic	World Tennis Tour	Clay	(Czech Republic) Andrew Paulson	(Italy) Franco Agamenone (Poland) Piotr Matuszewski	4–6, 3–6
Win	6–8	May 2021	M25 Jablonec, Czech Republic	World Tennis Tour	Clay	(Czech Republic) Andrew Paulson	(Belarus) Uladzimir Ignatik (Ukraine) Vitaliy Sachko	0–6, 6–2, [10–7]
Loss	6–9	Jun 2022	M15 Alkmaar, Netherlands	World Tennis Tour	Clay	(Czech Republic) Matěj Vocel	(Bulgaria) Alexander Donski (Sweden) Karl Friberg	6–3, 3–3 (RET)
Win	7–9	Jul 2022	M15 Litija, Slovenia	World Tennis Tour	Clay	(Czech Republic) Matěj Vocel	(Croatia) Tomislav Podvinski (Croatia) Alen Rogic-Hadzalic	6–0, 6–2
Win	8–9	Aug 2022	M15 Malmö, Sweden	World Tennis Tour	Hard	(Czech Republic) Matěj Vocel	(Sweden) Filip Bergevi (Netherlands) Mick Veldheer	6–4, 3–6, [10–7]
Win	9–9	Jul 2023	M25 Kassel, Germany	World Tennis Tour	Clay	(Czech Republic) Jiri Barnat	(Bolivia) Murkel Dellien (Serbia) Stefan Latinović	6–4, 6–4
Win	10–9	Oct 2023	Ortisei, Italy	Challenger	Hard	(Czech Republic) Andrew Paulson	(Austria) Maximilian Neuchrist (Switzerland) Jakub Paul	4–6, 7–6^{(9–7)}, [11–9]
Win	11–9	Nov 2023	M25 Antalya, Turkey	World Tennis Tour	Clay	(Germany) Timo Stodder	(Romania) Mircea-Alexandru Jecan (Romania) Dan Alexandru Tomescu	6–4, 6–2
Loss	11–10	Jan 2024	M25 Nußloch, Germany	World Tennis Tour	Carpet	(Czech Republic) Matěj Vocel	(Germany) Daniel Masur (Germany) Kai Wehnelt	1–6, 6–3, [8–10]
Win	12–10	Feb 2024	Nottingham, United Kingdom	Challenger	Hard (i)	(Czech Republic) Petr Nouza	(France) Antoine Escoffier (United Kingdom) Joshua Paris	6–3, 7–6^{(7–3)}
Win	13–10	Feb 2024	Tenerife, Spain	Challenger	Hard	(Czech Republic) Petr Nouza	(Netherlands) Sander Arends (Netherlands) Sem Verbeek	6–4, 4–6, [11–9]
Loss	13–11	May 2024	Tunis, Tunisia	Challenger	Clay	(Czech Republic) Michael Vrbenský	(Argentina) Federico Agustin Gómez (United Kingdom) Marcus Willis	6–4, 1–6, [6–10]
Loss	13–12	May 2024	Skopje, North Macedonia	Challenger	Clay	(Czech Republic) Andrew Paulson	(United States) Ryan Seggerman (United States) Patrik Trhac	3–6, 6–7^{(4–7)}
Loss	13–13	Jun 2024	Milan, Italy	Challenger	Clay	(Czech Republic) Petr Nouza	(United States) Ryan Seggerman (United States) Patrik Trhac	6–2, 4–6, [6–10]
Loss	13–14	Jul 2024	Salzburg, Austria	Challenger	Clay	(Czech Republic) Petr Nouza	(France) Manuel Guinard (France) Grégoire Jacq	6–2, 3–6, [12–14]
Win	14–14	Jul 2024	San Marino	Challenger	Clay	(Czech Republic) Petr Nouza	(France) Theo Arribage (Brazil) Orlando Luz	1–6, 7–5, [10–6]
Win	15–14	Sep 2024	Seville, Spain	Challenger	Clay	(Czech Republic) Petr Nouza	(United States) George Goldhoff (Brazil) Fernando Romboli	6–3, 6–2

== Junior Grand Slam finals ==
=== Doubles 2: (1 title, 1 runner-up) ===
Result	Year	Tournament	Surface	Partner	Opponent	Score
Loss	2016	Australian Open	Hard	(Slovakia) Lukáš Klein	(Australia) Alex de Minaur (Australia) Blake Ellis	6–3, 5–7, [10–12]
Win	2016	French Open	Clay	(Israel) Yshai Oliel	(South Korea) Chung Yun-seong (Brazil) Orlando Luz	6–3, 6–4
