= 2026 Challenger de Tigre II – Doubles =

Doubles
- 2026 Challenger de Tigre II

Final
- Champions: (Uruguay) Ignacio Carou (Argentina) Mariano Kestelboim
- Runners-up: (Argentina) Valentín Basel (Argentina) Franco Ribero
- Score: 7–6^{(7–4)}, 6–4

Events
| Singles | Doubles |
- Challenger de Tigre

Mariano Kestelboim and Juan Carlos Prado Ángelo were the defending champions but only Kestelboim chose to defend his title, partnering Ignacio Carou. He successfully defended his title after defeating Valentín Basel and Franco Ribero 7–6^{(7–4)}, 6–4 in the final.

== Seeds ==
1. (Uruguay) Ignacio Carou / (Argentina) Mariano Kestelboim (champions)
2. (Argentina) Santiago Rodríguez Taverna / (Argentina) Gonzalo Villanueva (semifinals, withdrew)
3. (Brazil) Igor Marcondes / (Brazil) Eduardo Ribeiro (quarterfinals)
4. (Argentina) Valentín Basel / (Argentina) Franco Ribero (final)

== Draw ==
Key

- Q = Qualifier
- WC = Wild card
- LL = Lucky loser
- Alt = Alternate
- ITF = ITF entry
- PR = Protected ranking
- SR = Special ranking
- SE = Special exempt
- JE = Junior exempt
- JR = Junior Accelerator Programme entrant
- CO = College Accelerator Programme entrant
- NG = Next Gen Accelerator Program entrant
- w/o = Walkover
- r = Retired
- d = Defaulted

First round
1 | (Uruguay) I Carou (Argentina) M Kestelboim | 6 | 6
(Argentina) Manuel Mouilleron Salvo (Argentina) Lucio Ratti | 2 | 4
(Argentina) Mateo del Pino (Argentina) JM La Serna | w/o
(Argentina) GI Justo (Uruguay) F Roncadelli
3 | (Brazil) I Marcondes (Brazil) E Ribeiro | 6 | 6
(Argentina) LE Ambrogi (Argentina) Juan Estévez | 4 | 2
(Brazil) Bruno Fernandez (Brazil) J Pereira
(Italy) G Cadenasso (Spain) C Sánchez Jover | w/o
(Peru) C Huertas del Pino (Brazil) Nicolas Zanellato | 4 | 1
(Spain) M Damas (Spain) N Sánchez Izquierdo | 6 | 6
(Argentina) V Aboian (Argentina) Carlos María Zárate | 3 | 6 | [7]
4 | (Argentina) Valentín Basel (Argentina) F Ribero | 6 | 2 | [10]
(Brazil) P Sakamoto (Brazil) João Eduardo Schiessl | 4 | 2
(Uruguay) J Aguilar Cardozo (Argentina) S de la Fuente | 6 | 6
(Argentina) Thiago Cigarrán (Argentina) Lorenzo Joaquín Rodríguez | 6 | 5 | [7]
2 | (Argentina) S Rodríguez Taverna (Argentina) G Villanueva | 3 | 7 | [10]

Quarterfinals
1 | (Uruguay) I Carou (Argentina) M Kestelboim | 6 | 3 | [10]
(Argentina) M del Pino (Argentina) JM La Serna | 2 | 6 | [6]
3 | (Brazil) I Marcondes (Brazil) E Ribeiro | 6^{4} | 4
(Italy) G Cadenasso (Spain) C Sánchez Jover | 7^{7} | 6
(Spain) M Damas (Spain) N Sánchez Izquierdo | 6 | 3 | [6]
4 | (Argentina) V Basel (Argentina) F Ribero | 3 | 6 | [10]
(Uruguay) J Aguilar Cardozo (Argentina) S de la Fuente
2 | (Argentina) S Rodríguez Taverna (Argentina) G Villanueva | w/o

Semifinals
1 | (Uruguay) I Carou (Argentina) M Kestelboim | w/o
(Italy) G Cadenasso (Spain) C Sánchez Jover
4 | (Argentina) V Basel (Argentina) F Ribero | w/o
2 | (Argentina) S Rodríguez Taverna (Argentina) G Villanueva

Final
1 | (Uruguay) I Carou (Argentina) M Kestelboim | 7^{7} | 6
4 | (Argentina) V Basel (Argentina) F Ribero | 6^{4} | 4
