= 2026 Challenger de Tigre II – Singles =

Singles
- 2026 Challenger de Tigre II

Final
- Champion: (Argentina) Facundo Díaz Acosta
- Runner-up: (Spain) Miguel Damas
- Score: 1–6, 6–3, 6–0

Events
Singles	Doubles
- Challenger de Tigre

Guido Iván Justo was the defending champion but lost in the second round to Álvaro Guillén Meza.

Facundo Díaz Acosta won the title after defeating Miguel Damas 1–6, 6–3, 6–0 in the final.

== Seeds ==
1. (Netherlands) Guy den Ouden (first round, retired)
2. (Ecuador) Álvaro Guillén Meza (semifinals)
3. (Bolivia) Juan Carlos Prado Ángelo (first round)
4. (Peru) Gonzalo Bueno (first round)
5. (Argentina) Lautaro Midón (first round)
6. (Argentina) Genaro Alberto Olivieri (second round)
7. (Argentina) Santiago Rodríguez Taverna (first round)
8. (Argentina) Andrea Collarini (first round)

== Draw ==
Key

- Q = Qualifier
- WC = Wild card
- LL = Lucky loser
- Alt = Alternate
- ITF = ITF entry
- PR = Protected ranking
- SR = Special ranking
- SE = Special exempt
- JE = Junior exempt
- JR = Junior Accelerator Programme entrant
- CO = College Accelerator Programme entrant
- NG = Next Gen Accelerator Program entrant
- w/o = Walkover
- r = Retired
- d = Defaulted

=== Finals ===
Semifinals
Q	(Germany) Diego Dedura	4	6	5
(Spain) Miguel Damas	6	4	7
(Argentina) Facundo Díaz Acosta	3	7^{7}	6
2	(Ecuador) Álvaro Guillén Meza	6	6^{4}	2

Final
(Spain) Miguel Damas	6	3	0
(Argentina) Facundo Díaz Acosta	1	6	6

=== Top half ===
First round
1	(Netherlands) G den Ouden	4	0^{r}
Q	(Germany) D Dedura	6	2
WC	(Argentina) JM La Serna	7^{9}	6
Q	(Argentina) V Aboian	6^{7}	2
Q	(Uruguay) J Aguilar Cardozo	6	2	6
Q	(Brazil) E Ribeiro	1	6	1
(Peru) JP Varillas	6	6
5	(Argentina) L Midón	4	1
3	(Bolivia) JC Prado Ángelo	6^{5}	1
(Spain) M Damas	7^{7}	6
WC	(Argentina) Juan Estévez	4	6^{0}
(Spain) C Sánchez Jover	6	7^{7}
WC	(Argentina) Carlos María Zárate	2	6	5
(Italy) G Cadenasso	6	3	7
(Brazil) D Dutra da Silva	6	6
8	(Argentina) A Collarini	4	3

Second round
Q	(Germany) D Dedura	6	6
WC	(Argentina) JM La Serna	1	3
Q	(Uruguay) J Aguilar Cardozo	7^{7}	2	0^{r}
(Peru) JP Varillas	6^{4}	6	2
(Spain) M Damas	6	6
(Spain) C Sánchez Jover	4	1
(Italy) G Cadenasso	4	6	7
(Brazil) D Dutra da Silva	6	1	5

Quarterfinals
Q	(Germany) D Dedura	6	7^{7}
(Peru) JP Varillas	4	6^{3}
(Spain) M Damas	6	6
(Italy) G Cadenasso	2	3

Semifinals
Q	(Germany) D Dedura	4	6	5
(Spain) M Damas	6	4	7

=== Bottom half ===
First round
7	(Argentina) S Rodríguez Taverna	4	2
(Spain) N Sánchez Izquierdo	6	6
(Argentina) F Díaz Acosta	6	6
LL	(Brazil) João Eduardo Schiessl	1	0
Alt	(Brazil) I Marcondes	7^{7}	6
(Italy) F Agamenone	6^{2}	1
(Argentina) JB Torres	7	6
4	(Peru) G Bueno	5	1
6	(Argentina) GA Olivieri	7	6
Q	(Argentina) LE Ambrogi	5	1
Alt	(Brazil) P Sakamoto	3	5
Q	(Romania) Ștefan Paloși	6	7
Alt	(Argentina) G Villanueva	5	5
(Argentina) GI Justo	7	7
(Uruguay) F Roncadelli	4	4
2	(Ecuador) Á Guillén Meza	6	6

Second round
(Spain) N Sánchez Izquierdo	4	2
(Argentina) F Díaz Acosta	6	6
Alt	(Brazil) I Marcondes	2	0
(Argentina) JB Torres	6	6
6	(Argentina) GA Olivieri	6	4	6^{4}
Q	(Romania) Ș Paloși	4	6	7^{7}
(Argentina) GI Justo	6^{4}	6	2
2	(Ecuador) Á Guillén Meza	7^{7}	3	6

Quarterfinals
(Argentina) F Díaz Acosta	6	6
(Argentina) JB Torres	2	3
Q	(Romania) Ș Paloși	3	0
2	(Ecuador) Á Guillén Meza	6	6

Semifinals
(Argentina) F Díaz Acosta	3	7^{7}	6
2	(Ecuador) Á Guillén Meza	6	6^{4}	2
