= 2026 Challenger de Tigre – Doubles =

Doubles
- 2026 Challenger de Tigre

Final
- Champions: (Argentina) Mariano Kestelboim (Bolivia) Juan Carlos Prado Ángelo
- Runners-up: (Argentina) Santiago Rodríguez Taverna (Argentina) Gonzalo Villanueva
- Score: 6–4, 5–7, [10–7]

Events
Singles	Doubles
- Challenger de Tigre

Mariano Kestelboim and Gonzalo Villanueva were the defending champions but chose to defend their title with different partners. Kestelboim partnered Juan Carlos Prado Ángelo and successfully defended his title. Villanueva partnered Santiago Rodríguez Taverna but lost in the final to Kestelboim and Prado Ángelo.

Kestelboim and Prado Ángelo won the title after defeating Rodríguez Taverna and Villanueva 6–4, 5–7, [10–7] in the final.

== Seeds ==
1. (New Zealand) Finn Reynolds / (New Zealand) James Watt (first round)
2. (Argentina) Santiago Rodríguez Taverna / (Argentina) Gonzalo Villanueva (final)
3. (Argentina) Mariano Kestelboim / (Bolivia) Juan Carlos Prado Ángelo (champions)
4. (Uruguay) Ignacio Carou / (Argentina) Santiago de la Fuente (first round)

== Draw ==
Key

- Q = Qualifier
- WC = Wild card
- LL = Lucky loser
- Alt = Alternate
- ITF = ITF entry
- PR = Protected ranking
- SR = Special ranking
- SE = Special exempt
- JE = Junior exempt
- JR = Junior Accelerator Programme entrant
- CO = College Accelerator Programme entrant
- NG = Next Gen Accelerator Program entrant
- w/o = Walkover
- r = Retired
- d = Defaulted

First round
1	(New Zealand) F Reynolds (New Zealand) J Watt	3	6	[6]
Alt	(Brazil) Bruno Fernandez (Brazil) João Eduardo Schiessl	6	0	[10]
WC	(Argentina) V Aboian (Argentina) Carlos María Zárate	4	4
(Brazil) D Dutra da Silva (Brazil) J Pereira	6	6
3	(Argentina) M Kestelboim (Bolivia) JC Prado Ángelo	7	6
(Argentina) Valentín Basel (Argentina) F Ribero	5	0
(Argentina) Thiago Cigarrán (Argentina) Lorenzo Joaquín Rodríguez	5	4
(Argentina) Tomás Farjat (Peru) C Huertas del Pino	7	6
WC	(Argentina) Julián Cúndom (Argentina) Tomás Martínez	3	5
(Argentina) Juan Estévez (Argentina) Lucio Ratti	6	7
(Argentina) GI Justo (Uruguay) F Roncadelli	6^{5}	7^{7}	[10]
4	(Uruguay) I Carou (Argentina) S de la Fuente	7^{7}	6^{3}	[5]
(Italy) G Cadenasso (Spain) C Sánchez Jover	6	3
(Argentina) R Olivo (Brazil) P Sakamoto	1	3^{r}
(Uruguay) J Aguilar Cardozo (Argentina) Máximo Zeitune	6	3	[9]
2	(Argentina) S Rodríguez Taverna (Argentina) G Villanueva	4	6	[11]

Quarterfinals
Alt	(Brazil) B Fernandez (Brazil) JE Schiessl
(Brazil) D Dutra da Silva (Brazil) J Pereira	w/o
3	(Argentina) M Kestelboim (Bolivia) JC Prado Ángelo	6	6
(Argentina) T Farjat (Peru) C Huertas del Pino	2	0
(Argentina) J Estévez (Argentina) L Ratti	w/o
(Argentina) GI Justo (Uruguay) F Roncadelli
(Italy) G Cadenasso (Spain) C Sánchez Jover	7	3	[8]
2	(Argentina) S Rodríguez Taverna (Argentina) G Villanueva	5	6	[10]

Semifinals
(Brazil) D Dutra da Silva (Brazil) J Pereira	4	4
3	(Argentina) M Kestelboim (Bolivia) JC Prado Ángelo	6	6
(Argentina) J Estévez (Argentina) L Ratti	2	7	[7]
2	(Argentina) S Rodríguez Taverna (Argentina) G Villanueva	6	5	[10]

Final
3	(Argentina) M Kestelboim (Bolivia) JC Prado Ángelo	6	5	[10]
2	(Argentina) S Rodríguez Taverna (Argentina) G Villanueva	4	7	[7]
