= 2023 Challenger de Tigre II – Singles =

Singles
- 2023 Challenger de Tigre II

Final
- Champion: (Argentina) Juan Manuel Cerúndolo
- Runner-up: (Netherlands) Jesper de Jong
- Score: 6–3, 2–6, 6–2

Events
Singles	Doubles
← 2023 ·	Challenger de Tigre	· 2025 →

Juan Manuel Cerúndolo was the defending champion and successfully defended his title, defeating Jesper de Jong 6–3, 2–6, 6–2 in the final.

== Seeds ==
1. (Argentina) Camilo Ugo Carabelli (second round)
2. (Argentina) Juan Manuel Cerúndolo (champion)
3. (Argentina) Mariano Navone (quarterfinals)
4. (Argentina) Andrea Collarini (semifinals)
5. (Argentina) Juan Bautista Torres (quarterfinals)
6. (Argentina) Hernán Casanova (first round)
7. (Italy) Alessandro Giannessi (semifinals)
8. (Spain) Oriol Roca Batalla (first round)

== Draw ==
=== Key ===
- Q = Qualifier
- WC = Wild card
- LL = Lucky loser
- Alt = Alternate
- SE = Special exempt
- PR = Protected ranking
- ITF = ITF entry
- JE = Junior exempt
- w/o = Walkover
- r = Retired
- d = Defaulted
- SR = Special ranking

=== Finals ===
Semifinals
(Netherlands) Jesper de Jong	6	5	6
7	(Italy) Alessandro Giannessi	4	7	1
4	(Argentina) Andrea Collarini	3	1
2	(Argentina) Juan Manuel Cerúndolo	6	6

Final
(Netherlands) Jesper de Jong	3	6	2
2	(Argentina) Juan Manuel Cerúndolo	6	2	6

=== Top half ===
First round
1/WC	(Argentina) C Ugo Carabelli	7^{7}	4
Q	(Brazil) T Seyboth Wild	6^{4}	0^{r}
Q	(Argentina) MF Descotte	2	2
(Netherlands) J de Jong	6	6
(Argentina) G Villanueva	6	2	6
(United States) E Zhu	1	6	2
Q	(Spain) C Sánchez Jover	6^{6}	6	7
6	(Argentina) H Casanova	7^{8}	4	5
3	(Argentina) M Navone	6	6
WC	(Argentina) V Aboian	3	2
(Italy) Alexander Weis	5	0^{r}
(Germany) Timo Stodder	7	3
(Brazil) P Boscardin Dias	5	6	6
Q	(France) Jurgen Briand	7	2	2
(Argentina) JI Londero	4^{r}
7	(Italy) A Giannessi	3

Second round
1/WC	(Argentina) C Ugo Carabelli	4	1
(Netherlands) J de Jong	6	6
(Argentina) G Villanueva	6	6
Q	(Spain) C Sánchez Jover	4	2
3	(Argentina) M Navone	6	7
(Germany) T Stodder	2	5
(Brazil) P Boscardin Dias	2	2
7	(Italy) A Giannessi	6	6

Quarterfinals
(Netherlands) J de Jong	6	7^{7}
(Argentina) G Villanueva	2	6^{0}
3	(Argentina) M Navone	7^{8}	5	1
7	(Italy) A Giannessi	6^{6}	7	6

Semifinals
(Netherlands) J de Jong	6	5	6
7	(Italy) A Giannessi	4	7	1

=== Bottom half ===
First round
8	(Spain) O Roca Batalla	2	5
(Brazil) JL Reis da Silva	6	7
Alt	(Switzerland) R Bertola	6	5	1
(France) T Atmane	4	7	6
Alt	(Tunisia) M Echargui	4	6	6
(France) T Droguet	6	1	0
Q	(Ukraine) O Prihodko	1	4
4	(Argentina) A Collarini	6	6
5	(Argentina) JB Torres	7	6
(Bolivia) M Dellien	5	4
(Argentina) F Comesaña	3	4
WC	(Argentina) Tomás Farjat	6	6
(South Korea) Y-s Chung	3	1
Q	(Italy) Edoardo Lavagno	6	6
(Brazil) D Dutra da Silva	2	1
2	(Argentina) JM Cerúndolo	6	6

Second round
(Brazil) JL Reis da Silva	3	2
(France) T Atmane	6	6
Alt	(Tunisia) M Echargui	6^{6}	6^{3}
4	(Argentina) A Collarini	7^{8}	7^{7}
5	(Argentina) JB Torres	6	6
WC	(Argentina) T Farjat	4	1
Q	(Italy) E Lavagno	5	6	2
2	(Argentina) JM Cerúndolo	7	4	6

Quarterfinals
(France) T Atmane	4	1
4	(Argentina) A Collarini	6	6
5	(Argentina) JB Torres	2	6^{2}
2	(Argentina) JM Cerúndolo	6	7^{7}

Semifinals
4	(Argentina) A Collarini	3	1
2	(Argentina) JM Cerúndolo	6	6
