= 2026 Challenger de Tigre – Singles =

Singles
- 2026 Challenger de Tigre

Final
- Champion: (Argentina) Guido Iván Justo
- Runner-up: (Argentina) Lautaro Midón
- Score: 4–6, 6–3, 6–0

Events
Singles	Doubles
- Challenger de Tigre

Juan Pablo Varillas was the defending champion but lost in the first round to Álvaro Guillén Meza.

Guido Iván Justo won the title after defeating Lautaro Midón 4–6, 6–3, 6–0 in the final.

== Seeds ==
1. (Ecuador) Álvaro Guillén Meza (second round)
2. (Peru) Gonzalo Bueno (semifinals)
3. (Argentina) Genaro Alberto Olivieri (second round)
4. (Argentina) Santiago Rodríguez Taverna (first round)
5. (Argentina) Lautaro Midón (final)
6. (Argentina) Andrea Collarini (quarterfinals)
7. (Italy) Franco Agamenone (first round)
8. (Argentina) Nicolás Kicker (second round)

== Draw ==
Key

- Q = Qualifier
- WC = Wild card
- LL = Lucky loser
- Alt = Alternate
- ITF = ITF entry
- PR = Protected ranking
- SR = Special ranking
- SE = Special exempt
- JE = Junior exempt
- JR = Junior Accelerator Programme entrant
- CO = College Accelerator Programme entrant
- NG = Next Gen Accelerator Program entrant
- w/o = Walkover
- r = Retired
- d = Defaulted

=== Finals ===
Semifinals
5	(Argentina) Lautaro Midón	6	7
(Spain) Carlos Sánchez Jover	4	5
(Argentina) Guido Iván Justo	4	6	6
2	(Peru) Gonzalo Bueno	6	2	2

Final
5	(Argentina) Lautaro Midón	6	3	0
(Argentina) Guido Iván Justo	4	6	6

=== Top half ===
First round
1	(Ecuador) Á Guillén Meza	3	6	6
(Peru) JP Varillas	6	2	4
Q	(Brazil) Nicolas Zanellato	2	7^{7}	4
(Argentina) JM La Serna	6	6^{5}	6
WC	(Argentina) Carlos María Zárate	6^{4}	7^{7}	6
(Spain) M Damas	7^{7}	6^{4}	3
WC	(Argentina) Dante Pagani	2	2
5	(Argentina) L Midón	6	6
4	(Argentina) S Rodríguez Taverna	4	6	4
Q	(Romania) Ștefan Paloși	6	3	6
(Brazil) P Sakamoto	3	5
(Spain) C Sánchez Jover	6	7
Q	(Brazil) João Eduardo Schiessl	3	4
(Argentina) G Villanueva	6	6
(Italy) G Cadenasso	2	4
8	(Argentina) N Kicker	6	6

Second round
1	(Ecuador) Á Guillén Meza	6	3	1
(Argentina) JM La Serna	1	6	6
WC	(Argentina) CM Zárate	4	2
5	(Argentina) L Midón	6	6
Q	(Romania) Ș Paloși	6	1	0
(Spain) C Sánchez Jover	0	6	6
(Argentina) G Villanueva	6	1	6
8	(Argentina) N Kicker	4	6	4

Quarterfinals
(Argentina) JM La Serna	6^{1}	6	5
5	(Argentina) L Midón	7^{7}	2	7
(Spain) C Sánchez Jover	6	6
(Argentina) G Villanueva	2	1

Semifinals
5	(Argentina) L Midón	6	7
(Spain) C Sánchez Jover	4	5

=== Bottom half ===
First round
7	(Italy) F Agamenone	2	2
(Argentina) GI Justo	6	6
(Argentina) F Díaz Acosta	5	7^{7}	6
Q	(Uruguay) J Aguilar Cardozo	7	6^{5}	3
Q	(Brazil) Bruno Fernandez	6	6
(Bolivia) M Dellien	4	2
Alt	(Argentina) LE Ambrogi	3	1^{r}
3	(Argentina) GA Olivieri	6	4
6	(Argentina) A Collarini	7^{7}	6
WC	(Argentina) Lucio Ratti	6^{4}	4
(Argentina) JB Torres	6	6
Alt	(Argentina) M Kestelboim	4	3
Q	(Argentina) Máximo Zeitune	4	1
(Uruguay) F Roncadelli	6	6
(Brazil) D Dutra da Silva	5	6	1
2	(Peru) G Bueno	7	1	6

Second round
(Argentina) GI Justo	7	6
(Argentina) F Díaz Acosta	5	0
Q	(Brazil) B Fernandez	6	6^{5}	7
3	(Argentina) GA Olivieri	1	7^{7}	5
6	(Argentina) A Collarini	5	6	6
(Argentina) JB Torres	7	3	3
(Uruguay) F Roncadelli	3	4
2	(Peru) G Bueno	6	6

Quarterfinals
(Argentina) GI Justo	6	6
Q	(Brazil) B Fernandez	1	3
6	(Argentina) A Collarini	6^{11}	2
2	(Peru) G Bueno	7^{13}	6

Semifinals
(Argentina) GI Justo	4	6	6
2	(Peru) G Bueno	6	2	2
