= 2022 Challenger de Tigre II – Singles =

Singles
- 2022 Challenger de Tigre II

Final
- Champion: (Argentina) Camilo Ugo Carabelli
- Runner-up: (Argentina) Andrea Collarini
- Score: 7–5, 6–2

Events
| Singles | Doubles |
- Challenger de Tigre

Santiago Rodríguez Taverna was the defending champion but lost in the quarterfinals to Genaro Alberto Olivieri.

Camilo Ugo Carabelli won the title after defeating Andrea Collarini 7–5, 6–2 in the final.

== Seeds ==
1. (Argentina) Facundo Bagnis (second round)
2. (Peru) Juan Pablo Varillas (semifinals)
3. (Argentina) Camilo Ugo Carabelli (champion)
4. (Argentina) Renzo Olivo (second round)
5. (Brazil) Felipe Meligeni Alves (quarterfinals)
6. (Argentina) Nicolás Kicker (first round)
7. (Argentina) Santiago Rodríguez Taverna (quarterfinals)
8. (Brazil) João Menezes (first round)

== Draw ==
Key

- Q = Qualifier
- WC = Wild card
- LL = Lucky loser
- Alt = Alternate
- ITF = ITF entry
- PR = Protected ranking
- SR = Special ranking
- SE = Special exempt
- JE = Junior exempt
- JR = Junior Accelerator Programme entrant
- CO = College Accelerator Programme entrant
- NG = Next Gen Accelerator Program entrant
- w/o = Walkover
- r = Retired
- d = Defaulted

=== Finals ===
Semifinals
(Argentina) Genaro Alberto Olivieri | 4 | 1
(Argentina) Andrea Collarini | 6 | 6
3 | (Argentina) Camilo Ugo Carabelli | 3 | 6 | 6
2 | (Peru) Juan Pablo Varillas | 6 | 1 | 0

Final
(Argentina) Andrea Collarini | 5 | 2
3 | (Argentina) Camilo Ugo Carabelli | 7 | 6

=== Top half ===
First round
1/WC | (Argentina) F Bagnis | 2 | 6 | 6
Q | (Peru) C Huertas del Pino | 6 | 3 | 4
Q | (Bolivia) M Dellien | 3 | 6 | 1
(Argentina) GA Olivieri | 6 | 4 | 6
Q | (Argentina) Juan Ignacio Galarza | 4 | 7^{7} | 2
(Portugal) J Domingues | 6 | 6^{3} | 6
Q | (Argentina) S de la Fuente | 6^{0} | 4
7 | (Argentina) S Rodríguez Taverna | 7^{7} | 6
4 | (Argentina) R Olivo | 7^{9} | 6
(France) M Janvier | 6^{7} | 1
(Chile) G Lama | 5 | 3
(Argentina) A Collarini | 7 | 6
Alt | (Brazil) G Heide | 6^{7} | 6^{3}
WC | (Argentina) AL Lingua Lavallén | 7^{9} | 7^{7}
(Argentina) JB Torres | 6^{1} | 5
5 | (Brazil) F Meligeni Alves | 7^{7} | 7

Second round
1/WC | (Argentina) F Bagnis | 6^{4} | 3
(Argentina) GA Olivieri | 7^{7} | 6
(Portugal) J Domingues | 4 | 3
7 | (Argentina) S Rodríguez Taverna | 6 | 6
4 | (Argentina) R Olivo | 6 | 1 | 3
(Argentina) A Collarini | 4 | 6 | 6
WC | (Argentina) AL Lingua Lavallén | 1 | 3
5 | (Brazil) F Meligeni Alves | 6 | 6

Quarterfinals
(Argentina) GA Olivieri | 7^{7} | 6
7 | (Argentina) S Rodríguez Taverna | 6^{4} | 3
(Argentina) A Collarini | 1 | 6 | 6
5 | (Brazil) F Meligeni Alves | 6 | 2 | 2

Semifinals
(Argentina) GA Olivieri | 4 | 1
(Argentina) A Collarini | 6 | 6

=== Bottom half ===
First round
8 | (Brazil) J Menezes | 6 | 4 | 3
(Argentina) G Villanueva | 3 | 6 | 6
WC | (Argentina) RA Burruchaga | 6 | 6
Q | (Argentina) Franco Emanuel Egea | 2 | 1
Q | (Israel) D Cukierman | 3 | 6 | 1
(Argentina) F Díaz Acosta | 6 | 3 | 6
(Argentina) Facundo Juárez | 2 | 4
3 | (Argentina) C Ugo Carabelli | 6 | 6
6 | (Argentina) N Kicker | 2 | 4
(Italy) L Darderi | 6 | 6
Alt | (Colombia) C Rodríguez | 6^{7} | 6^{1}
(Argentina) F Comesaña | 7^{9} | 7^{7}
(Argentina) H Casanova | 2 | 1
(Spain) P Martín Tiffon | 6 | 6
(Brazil) Gilbert Klier Júnior | 2 | 2
2 | (Peru) JP Varillas | 6 | 6

Second round
(Argentina) G Villanueva | 7 | 6
WC | (Argentina) RA Burruchaga | 5 | 1
(Argentina) F Díaz Acosta | 3 | 2
3 | (Argentina) C Ugo Carabelli | 6 | 6
(Italy) L Darderi | 6^{5} | 4
(Argentina) F Comesaña | 7^{7} | 6
(Spain) P Martín Tiffon | 5 | 4
2 | (Peru) JP Varillas | 7 | 6

Quarterfinals
(Argentina) G Villanueva | 4 | 2
3 | (Argentina) C Ugo Carabelli | 6 | 6
(Argentina) F Comesaña | 4 | 3
2 | (Peru) JP Varillas | 6 | 6

Semifinals
3 | (Argentina) C Ugo Carabelli | 3 | 6 | 6
2 | (Peru) JP Varillas | 6 | 1 | 0
