= 2026 Challenger de Tigre II =

- Date: 23 February – 1 March
- Edition: 7th
- Surface: Clay
- Location: Tigre, Argentina

Champions

Singles
- (Argentina) Facundo Díaz Acosta

Doubles
- (Uruguay) Ignacio Carou / (Argentina) Mariano Kestelboim
- Challenger de Tigre

The 2026 AAT Challenger Santander edición Tigre II was a professional tennis tournament played on clay courts. It was the seventh edition of the tournament which was part of the 2026 ATP Challenger Tour. It took place in Tigre, Argentina between 23 February and 1 March 2026.

== Singles main-draw entrants ==
=== Seeds ===
Country	Player	Rank^{1}	Seed
NED	Guy den Ouden	154	1
ECU	Álvaro Guillén Meza	202	2
BOL	Juan Carlos Prado Ángelo	212	3
PER	Gonzalo Bueno	218	4
ARG	Lautaro Midón	226	5
ARG	Genaro Alberto Olivieri	228	6
ARG	Santiago Rodríguez Taverna	231	7
ARG	Andrea Collarini	233	8

- ^{1} Rankings are as of 16 February 2026.

=== Other entrants ===
The following players received wildcards into the singles main draw:

- (Argentina) Juan Estévez
- (Argentina) Juan Manuel La Serna
- (Argentina) Carlos María Zárate

The following players received entry into the singles main draw as alternates:

- (Brazil) Igor Marcondes
- (Argentina) Genaro Alberto Olivieri
- (Argentina) Gonzalo Villanueva

The following players received entry from the qualifying draw:

- (Argentina) Valerio Aboian
- (Uruguay) Joaquín Aguilar Cardozo
- (Argentina) Luciano Emanuel Ambrogi
- (Germany) Diego Dedura
- (Romania) Ștefan Paloși
- (Brazil) Eduardo Ribeiro

The following player received entry as a lucky loser:

- (Brazil) João Eduardo Schiessl

== Champions ==
=== Singles ===
- (Argentina) Facundo Díaz Acosta def. (Spain) Miguel Damas 1–6, 6–3, 6–0.

=== Doubles ===
- (Uruguay) Ignacio Carou / (Argentina) Mariano Kestelboim def. (Argentina) Valentín Basel / (Argentina) Franco Ribero 7–6^{(7–4)}, 6–4.
