= 2022 Challenger de Tigre II – Doubles =

Doubles
- 2022 Challenger de Tigre II

Final
- Champions: (Argentina) Guillermo Durán (Brazil) Felipe Meligeni Alves
- Runners-up: (Italy) Luciano Darderi (Argentina) Juan Bautista Torres
- Score: 3–6, 6–4, [10–3]

Events
Singles	Doubles
- Challenger de Tigre

Conner Huertas del Pino and Mats Rosenkranz were the defending champions but only Huertas del Pino chose to defend his title, partnering Alexander Merino. Huertas del Pino lost in the first round to Murkel Dellien and Jorge Panta.

Guillermo Durán and Felipe Meligeni Alves won the title after defeating Luciano Darderi and Juan Bautista Torres 3–6, 6–4, [10–3] in the final.

== Seeds ==
1. (Argentina) Guillermo Durán / (Brazil) Felipe Meligeni Alves (champions)
2. (Ecuador) Diego Hidalgo / (Colombia) Cristian Rodríguez (quarterfinals)
3. (Argentina) Hernán Casanova / (Argentina) Santiago Rodríguez Taverna (semifinals)
4. (Argentina) Andrea Collarini / (Argentina) Renzo Olivo (semifinals)

== Draw ==
Key

- Q = Qualifier
- WC = Wild card
- LL = Lucky loser
- Alt = Alternate
- ITF = ITF entry
- PR = Protected ranking
- SR = Special ranking
- SE = Special exempt
- JE = Junior exempt
- JR = Junior Accelerator Programme entrant
- CO = College Accelerator Programme entrant
- NG = Next Gen Accelerator Program entrant
- w/o = Walkover
- r = Retired
- d = Defaulted

First round
1	(Argentina) G Durán (Brazil) F Meligeni Alves	6	6
(Brazil) P Boscardin Dias (Brazil) G Heide	4	4
WC	(Argentina) S de la Fuente (Argentina) Juan Bautista Otegui	7^{8}	2
WC	(Argentina) F Comesaña (Argentina) AL Lingua Lavallén	6^{6}	1^{r}
3	(Argentina) H Casanova (Argentina) S Rodríguez Taverna	6	6
(Argentina) Juan Ignacio Galarza (Slovenia) T Lipovšek Puches	4	2
(Peru) C Huertas del Pino (Peru) A Merino	6	4	[6]
(Bolivia) M Dellien (Peru) J Panta	2	6	[10]
(Argentina) RA Burruchaga (Argentina) G Villanueva	6	6
(Israel) D Cukierman (Argentina) M Kestelboim	4	3
(Argentina) Facundo Juárez (Spain) P Martín Tiffon	6^{4}	5
4	(Argentina) A Collarini (Argentina) R Olivo	7^{7}	7
(Italy) L Darderi (Argentina) JB Torres	6	6
(Argentina) Mateo Nicolás Martínez (Argentina) M Navone	1	2
(Uruguay) I Carou (Argentina) GA Olivieri
2	(Ecuador) D Hidalgo (Colombia) C Rodríguez	w/o

Quarterfinals
1	(Argentina) G Durán (Brazil) F Meligeni Alves	6	6
WC	(Argentina) S de la Fuente (Argentina) JB Otegui	1	1
3	(Argentina) H Casanova (Argentina) S Rodríguez Taverna	6	4	[10]
(Bolivia) M Dellien (Peru) J Panta	4	6	[5]
(Argentina) RA Burruchaga (Argentina) G Villanueva	3	3
4	(Argentina) A Collarini (Argentina) R Olivo	6	6
(Italy) L Darderi (Argentina) JB Torres	3	6	[10]
2	(Ecuador) D Hidalgo (Colombia) C Rodríguez	6	3	[5]

Semifinals
1	(Argentina) G Durán (Brazil) F Meligeni Alves	7^{7}	7^{9}
3	(Argentina) H Casanova (Argentina) S Rodríguez Taverna	6^{3}	6^{7}
4	(Argentina) A Collarini (Argentina) R Olivo	6	4	[5]
(Italy) L Darderi (Argentina) JB Torres	4	6	[10]

Final
1	(Argentina) G Durán (Brazil) F Meligeni Alves	3	6	[10]
(Italy) L Darderi (Argentina) JB Torres	6	4	[3]
