= 2022 Challenger de Tigre – Doubles =

Doubles
- 2022 Challenger de Tigre

Final
- Champions: (Peru) Conner Huertas del Pino (Germany) Mats Rosenkranz
- Runners-up: (Argentina) Matías Franco Descotte (Argentina) Facundo Díaz Acosta
- Score: 5–6 ret.

Events
Singles	Doubles
- Challenger de Tigre

This was the first edition of the tournament.

Conner Huertas del Pino and Mats Rosenkranz won the title after Matías Franco Descotte and Facundo Díaz Acosta retired leading 6–5 in the first set of the final.

== Seeds ==
1. (Argentina) Hernán Casanova / (Peru) Alexander Merino (quarterfinals)
2. (Italy) Luciano Darderi / (Argentina) Juan Bautista Torres (first round)
3. (Argentina) Guido Andreozzi / (Slovenia) Tomás Lipovšek Puches (quarterfinals)
4. (Brazil) Daniel Dutra da Silva / (Argentina) Mariano Kestelboim (quarterfinals)

== Draw ==
Key

- Q = Qualifier
- WC = Wild card
- LL = Lucky loser
- Alt = Alternate
- ITF = ITF entry
- PR = Protected ranking
- SR = Special ranking
- SE = Special exempt
- JE = Junior exempt
- JR = Junior Accelerator Programme entrant
- CO = College Accelerator Programme entrant
- NG = Next Gen Accelerator Program entrant
- w/o = Walkover
- r = Retired
- d = Defaulted

First round
(Brazil) Wilson Leite (Argentina) G Villanueva	3	3
(Peru) C Huertas del Pino (Germany) M Rosenkranz	6	6
4	(Brazil) D Dutra da Silva (Argentina) M Kestelboim	7^{7}	6
(United States) S Kirchheimer (United States) N Rubin	6^{3}	2
WC	(Argentina) Gianluca Citadini (Argentina) Nicolás Eli	5	4
WC	(Argentina) JM La Serna (Argentina) L Midón	7	6
(Brazil) P Boscardin Dias (Brazil) J Pereira	6^{2}	2
(Argentina) RA Burruchaga (Spain) José Francisco Vidal Azorín	7^{7}	6
(Chile) G Lama (United States) N Moreno de Alboran	4	2
3	(Argentina) G Andreozzi (Slovenia) T Lipovšek Puches	6	6
(Argentina) Leonardo Aboian (Argentina) JP Paz	4	3
(Argentina) Facundo Juárez (Argentina) S Rodríguez Taverna	6	6
(Argentina) MF Descotte (Argentina) F Díaz Acosta	6	6
2	(Italy) L Darderi (Argentina) JB Torres	1	2

Quarterfinals
1	(Argentina) H Casanova (Peru) A Merino	4	7^{7}	[6]
(Peru) C Huertas del Pino (Germany) M Rosenkranz	6	6^{1}	[10]
4	(Brazil) D Dutra da Silva (Argentina) M Kestelboim	6^{6}	6	[8]
WC	(Argentina) JM La Serna (Argentina) L Midón	7^{8}	4	[10]
(Argentina) RA Burruchaga (Spain) JF Vidal Azorín	6^{5}	6	[10]
3	(Argentina) G Andreozzi (Slovenia) T Lipovšek Puches	7^{7}	4	[5]
(Argentina) F Juárez (Argentina) S Rodríguez Taverna	3	6^{2}
(Argentina) MF Descotte (Argentina) F Díaz Acosta	6	7^{7}

Semifinals
(Peru) C Huertas del Pino (Germany) M Rosenkranz	w/o
WC	(Argentina) JM La Serna (Argentina) L Midón
(Argentina) RA Burruchaga (Spain) JF Vidal Azorín
(Argentina) MF Descotte (Argentina) F Díaz Acosta	w/o

Final
(Peru) C Huertas del Pino (Germany) M Rosenkranz	5
(Argentina) MF Descotte (Argentina) F Díaz Acosta	6^{r}
