= 2025 Challenger de Tigre – Singles =

Singles
- 2025 Challenger de Tigre

Final
- Champion: (Peru) Juan Pablo Varillas
- Runner-up: (Paraguay) Daniel Vallejo
- Score: 6–4, 6–4

Events
Singles	Doubles
- Challenger de Tigre

Juan Manuel Cerúndolo was the defending champion but chose not to defend his title.

Juan Pablo Varillas won the title after defeating Daniel Vallejo 6–4, 6–4 in the final.

== Seeds ==
1. (Argentina) Román Andrés Burruchaga (second round)
2. (Bolivia) Murkel Dellien (quarterfinals)
3. (Argentina) Andrea Collarini (first round, retired)
4. (Peru) Juan Pablo Varillas (champion)
5. (United States) Emilio Nava (quarterfinals)
6. (Argentina) Facundo Mena (first round)
7. (Paraguay) Daniel Vallejo (final)
8. (Peru) Gonzalo Bueno (semifinals)

== Draw ==
Key

- Q = Qualifier
- WC = Wild card
- LL = Lucky loser
- Alt = Alternate
- ITF = ITF entry
- PR = Protected ranking
- SR = Special ranking
- SE = Special exempt
- JE = Junior exempt
- JR = Junior Accelerator Programme entrant
- CO = College Accelerator Programme entrant
- NG = Next Gen Accelerator Program entrant
- w/o = Walkover
- r = Retired
- d = Defaulted

=== Finals ===
Semifinals
7	(Paraguay) Daniel Vallejo	7	6
(Ecuador) Álvaro Guillén Meza	5	2
4	(Peru) Juan Pablo Varillas	7^{7}	6
8	(Peru) Gonzalo Bueno	6^{4}	4

Final
7	(Paraguay) Daniel Vallejo	4	4
4	(Peru) Juan Pablo Varillas	6	6

=== Top half ===
First round
1	(Argentina) RA Burruchaga	6	6
Q	(France) M Chazal	2	3
Q	(Argentina) G Villanueva	6	4	6
(Argentina) JB Torres	4	6	3
(Argentina) GA Olivieri	6	6
(Brazil) D Dutra da Silva	3	1
(Argentina) R Olivo	4	2
7	(Paraguay) AD Vallejo	6	6
3	(Argentina) A Collarini	4	2^{r}
(Ecuador) Á Guillén Meza	6	4
(Ecuador) A Andrade	5	4
(Austria) J Schwärzler	7	6
(Argentina) S Rodríguez Taverna	1	6	6
WC	(Argentina) L Midón	6	4	4
(Brazil) M Alves	6^{2}	6	7^{7}
6	(Argentina) F Mena	7^{7}	2	6^{5}

Second round
1	(Argentina) RA Burruchaga	4	4
Q	(Argentina) G Villanueva	6	6
(Argentina) GA Olivieri	3	4
7	(Paraguay) AD Vallejo	6	6
(Ecuador) Á Guillén Meza	6	6
(Austria) J Schwärzler	3	2
(Argentina) S Rodríguez Taverna	6^{5}	6	7^{7}
(Brazil) M Alves	7^{7}	3	6^{5}

Quarterfinals
Q	(Argentina) G Villanueva	6	3	4
7	(Paraguay) AD Vallejo	3	6	6
(Ecuador) Á Guillén Meza	6	6
(Argentina) S Rodríguez Taverna	1	4

Semifinals
7	(Paraguay) AD Vallejo	7	6
(Ecuador) Á Guillén Meza	5	2

=== Bottom half ===
First round
5	(United States) Em Nava	6	6^{9}	7^{7}
Alt	(Spain) Àlex Martí Pujolràs	1	7^{11}	6^{5}
(Netherlands) M Houkes	6	6
Q	(Argentina) M Kestelboim	2	3
Q	(Argentina) LE Ambrogi	6	3	0
PR	(Argentina) N Kicker	3	6	6
(Bolivia) JC Prado Ángelo	7^{7}	5	4
4	(Peru) JP Varillas	6^{4}	7	6
8	(Peru) G Bueno	6	6
WC	(Argentina) Ezequiel Monferrer	2	1
(France) G Debru	6	6
(Italy) A Pellegrino	3	3
Q	(Italy) M Cecchinato	6	3	4
Q	(Brazil) JL Reis da Silva	3	6	6
WC	(Argentina) Máximo Zeitune	6	1	4
2	(Bolivia) M Dellien	4	6	6

Second round
5	(United States) Em Nava	7^{7}	6
(Netherlands) M Houkes	6^{5}	4
PR	(Argentina) N Kicker	6^{6}	3
4	(Peru) JP Varillas	7^{8}	6
8	(Peru) G Bueno	0	6	6
(France) G Debru	6	2	3
Q	(Brazil) JL Reis da Silva	7^{7}	3	4
2	(Bolivia) M Dellien	6^{3}	6	6

Quarterfinals
5	(United States) Em Nava	4	5
4	(Peru) JP Varillas	6	7
8	(Peru) G Bueno	6	6
2	(Bolivia) M Dellien	4	1

Semifinals
4	(Peru) JP Varillas	7^{7}	6
8	(Peru) G Bueno	6^{4}	4
