= 2025 Challenger de Tigre – Doubles =

Doubles
- 2025 Challenger de Tigre

Final
- Champions: (Argentina) Mariano Kestelboim (Argentina) Gonzalo Villanueva
- Runners-up: (Brazil) Luís Britto (Uruguay) Franco Roncadelli
- Score: 6–2, 7–5

Events
Singles	Doubles
- Challenger de Tigre

Daniel Dutra da Silva and Oleg Prihodko were the defending champions but only Dutra da Silva chose to defend his title, partnering Lautaro Midón. They lost in the first round to Luís Britto and Franco Roncadelli.

Mariano Kestelboim and Gonzalo Villanueva won the title after defeating Britto and Roncadelli 6–2, 7–5 in the final.

== Seeds ==
1. (Bolivia) Boris Arias / (Bolivia) Federico Zeballos (semifinals)
2. (Argentina) Mariano Kestelboim / (Argentina) Gonzalo Villanueva (champions)
3. (Brazil) Luís Britto / (Uruguay) Franco Roncadelli (final)
4. (Brazil) Mateus Alves / (Brazil) João Lucas Reis da Silva (withdrew)

== Draw ==
Key

- Q = Qualifier
- WC = Wild card
- LL = Lucky loser
- Alt = Alternate
- ITF = ITF entry
- PR = Protected ranking
- SR = Special ranking
- SE = Special exempt
- JE = Junior exempt
- JR = Junior Accelerator Programme entrant
- CO = College Accelerator Programme entrant
- NG = Next Gen Accelerator Program entrant
- w/o = Walkover
- r = Retired
- d = Defaulted

=== Draw ===
First round
1	(Bolivia) B Arias (Bolivia) F Zeballos	7	6
(Peru) A Huertas del Pino (Peru) C Huertas del Pino	5	4
(Argentina) S Rodríguez Taverna (Spain) N Sánchez Izquierdo	6	6^{2}	[8]
(Bolivia) M Dellien (Bolivia) JC Prado Ángelo	4	7^{7}	[10]
3	(Brazil) L Britto (Uruguay) F Roncadelli	7	4	[10]
(Brazil) D Dutra da Silva (Argentina) L Midón	5	6	[4]
(Argentina) V Aboian (Argentina) Mateo del Pino	4	2
(Argentina) A Collarini (Argentina) R Olivo	6	6
(France) M Chazal (Netherlands) M Houkes	6	6
WC	(Argentina) Romeo Arcuschin (Argentina) Máximo Zeitune	1	2
Alt	(Brazil) P Boscardin Dias (Argentina) AL Lingua Lavallén	3	7	[10]
(France) G Debru (Italy) A Pellegrino	6	5	[4]
(Spain) Àlex Martí Pujolràs (Argentina) GA Olivieri	4	4
2	(Argentina) M Kestelboim (Argentina) G Villanueva	6	6

Quarterfinals
1	(Bolivia) B Arias (Bolivia) F Zeballos	6	7
(Bolivia) M Dellien (Bolivia) JC Prado Ángelo	2	5
3	(Brazil) L Britto (Uruguay) F Roncadelli	6	6
(Argentina) A Collarini (Argentina) R Olivo	4	2
(France) M Chazal (Netherlands) M Houkes	4	6	[8]
WC	(Argentina) LE Ambrogi (Argentina) Tomás Farjat	6	3	[10]
Alt	(Brazil) P Boscardin Dias (Argentina) AL Lingua Lavallén	7^{7}	2	[8]
2	(Argentina) M Kestelboim (Argentina) G Villanueva	6^{3}	6	[10]

Semifinals
1	(Bolivia) B Arias (Bolivia) F Zeballos	6	4	[6]
3	(Brazil) L Britto (Uruguay) F Roncadelli	2	6	[10]
WC	(Argentina) LE Ambrogi (Argentina) T Farjat
2	(Argentina) M Kestelboim (Argentina) G Villanueva	w/o

Final
3	(Brazil) L Britto (Uruguay) F Roncadelli	2	5
2	(Argentina) M Kestelboim (Argentina) G Villanueva	6	7
