= 2023 Challenger de Tigre – Doubles =

Doubles
- 2023 Challenger de Tigre

Final
- Champions: (Argentina) Guido Andreozzi (Uruguay) Ignacio Carou
- Runners-up: (Argentina) Leonardo Aboian (Argentina) Ignacio Monzón
- Score: 5–7, 6–4, [10–5]

Events
Singles	Doubles
- Challenger de Tigre

Guillermo Durán and Felipe Meligeni Alves were the defending champions but chose not to defend their title.

Guido Andreozzi and Ignacio Carou won the title after defeating Leonardo Aboian and Ignacio Monzón 5–7, 6–4, [10–5] in the final.

== Seeds ==
1. (Poland) Karol Drzewiecki / (Poland) Piotr Matuszewski (quarterfinals)
2. (Netherlands) Jesper de Jong / (Ukraine) Oleg Prihodko (quarterfinals)
3. (Argentina) Guido Andreozzi / (Uruguay) Ignacio Carou (champions)
4. (Spain) Oriol Roca Batalla / (Germany) Timo Stodder (first round)

== Draw ==
Key

- Q = Qualifier
- WC = Wild card
- LL = Lucky loser
- Alt = Alternate
- ITF = ITF entry
- PR = Protected ranking
- SR = Special ranking
- SE = Special exempt
- JE = Junior exempt
- JR = Junior Accelerator Programme entrant
- CO = College Accelerator Programme entrant
- NG = Next Gen Accelerator Program entrant
- w/o = Walkover
- r = Retired
- d = Defaulted

First round
1	(Poland) K Drzewiecki (Poland) P Matuszewski	6	6
(Brazil) M Alves (Brazil) D Dutra da Silva	2	4
(Switzerland) R Bertola (Tunisia) M Echargui	6	6
Alt	(Argentina) Juan Bautista Otegui (Spain) C Sánchez Jover	4	4
4	(Spain) O Roca Batalla (Germany) Timo Stodder	2	6	[7]
Alt	(Brazil) P Boscardin Dias (Brazil) T Seyboth Wild	6	2	[10]
(Argentina) Leonardo Aboian (Argentina) Ignacio Monzón	6	2	[10]
Andrey Chepelev (Italy) Edoardo Lavagno	0	6	[7]
(Argentina) H Casanova (Argentina) F Comesaña	3	7^{7}	[10]
WC	(Argentina) Tomás Farjat (Argentina) JP Paz	6	6^{5}	[3]
Alt	(Argentina) LE Ambrogi (Argentina) Mateo del Pino	4	1
3	(Argentina) G Andreozzi (Uruguay) I Carou	6	6
(Argentina) MF Descotte (Peru) J Panta	0	6	[10]
(Ukraine) Eric Vanshelboim (Italy) Alexander Weis	6	3	[7]
(Argentina) V Aboian (Bolivia) M Dellien	2	1
2	(Netherlands) J de Jong (Ukraine) O Prihodko	6	6

Quarterfinals
1	(Poland) K Drzewiecki (Poland) P Matuszewski	4	4
(Switzerland) R Bertola (Tunisia) M Echargui	6	6
Alt	(Brazil) P Boscardin Dias (Brazil) T Seyboth Wild	4	2
(Argentina) L Aboian (Argentina) I Monzón	6	6
(Argentina) H Casanova (Argentina) F Comesaña	6^{6}	4
3	(Argentina) G Andreozzi (Uruguay) I Carou	7^{8}	6
(Argentina) MF Descotte (Peru) J Panta	7^{7}	6
2	(Netherlands) J de Jong (Ukraine) O Prihodko	6^{5}	4

Semifinals
(Switzerland) R Bertola (Tunisia) M Echargui	2	6	[7]
(Argentina) L Aboian (Argentina) I Monzón	6	2	[10]
3	(Argentina) G Andreozzi (Uruguay) I Carou	6	6
(Argentina) MF Descotte (Peru) J Panta	3	4

Final
(Argentina) L Aboian (Argentina) I Monzón	7	4	[5]
3	(Argentina) G Andreozzi (Uruguay) I Carou	5	6	[10]
