= 2022 Challenger de Tigre – Singles =

Singles
- 2022 Challenger de Tigre

Final
- Champion: (Argentina) Santiago Rodríguez Taverna
- Runner-up: (Argentina) Facundo Díaz Acosta
- Score: 6–4, 6–2

Events
Singles	Doubles
- Challenger de Tigre

This was the first edition of the tournament.

Santiago Rodríguez Taverna won the title after defeating Facundo Díaz Acosta 6–4, 6–2 in the final.

== Seeds ==
1. (Argentina) Guido Andreozzi (first round)
2. (Argentina) Santiago Rodríguez Taverna (champion)
3. (Argentina) Genaro Alberto Olivieri (second round)
4. (Chile) Gonzalo Lama (semifinals)
5. (Argentina) Hernán Casanova (quarterfinals)
6. (Spain) Carlos Gimeno Valero (second round)
7. (Argentina) Facundo Díaz Acosta (final)
8. (Italy) Luciano Darderi (first round)

== Draw ==
Key

- Q = Qualifier
- WC = Wild card
- LL = Lucky loser
- Alt = Alternate
- ITF = ITF entry
- PR = Protected ranking
- SR = Special ranking
- SE = Special exempt
- JE = Junior exempt
- JR = Junior Accelerator Programme entrant
- CO = College Accelerator Programme entrant
- NG = Next Gen Accelerator Program entrant
- w/o = Walkover
- r = Retired
- d = Defaulted

=== Finals ===
Semifinals
Q	(Bolivia) Murkel Dellien	3	1
7	(Argentina) Facundo Díaz Acosta	6	6
4	(Chile) Gonzalo Lama	1	3
2	(Argentina) Santiago Rodríguez Taverna	6	6

Final
7	(Argentina) Facundo Díaz Acosta	4	2
2	(Argentina) Santiago Rodríguez Taverna	6	6

=== Top half ===
First round
1	(Argentina) G Andreozzi	3	2
Q	(Bolivia) M Dellien	6	6
Q	(Slovenia) T Lipovšek Puches	6	7^{7}
WC	(Argentina) V Aboian	2	6^{3}
(Argentina) RA Burruchaga	6	7^{7}
WC	(Argentina) JM La Serna	1	6^{5}
(Argentina) AL Lingua Lavallén	4	6	3
6	(Spain) C Gimeno Valero	6	1	6
3	(Argentina) GA Olivieri	6	5	6
(United States) N Moreno de Alboran	4	7	2
(Argentina) G Villanueva	7^{7}	6
Q	(Netherlands) Alec Deckers	6^{2}	4
Alt	(Argentina) M Kestelboim	5	3^{r}
(Argentina) M Navone	7	5
WC	(Argentina) L Midón	5	3
7	(Argentina) F Díaz Acosta	7	6

Second round
Q	(Bolivia) M Dellien	6	6
Q	(Slovenia) T Lipovšek Puches	1	1
(Argentina) RA Burruchaga	6	4	7^{7}
6	(Spain) C Gimeno Valero	0	6	6^{4}
3	(Argentina) GA Olivieri	4	1
(Argentina) G Villanueva	6	6
(Argentina) M Navone	3	2
7	(Argentina) F Díaz Acosta	6	6

Quarterfinals
Q	(Bolivia) M Dellien	6	6
(Argentina) RA Burruchaga	3	1
(Argentina) G Villanueva	3	2
7	(Argentina) F Díaz Acosta	6	6

Semifinals
Q	(Bolivia) M Dellien	3	1
7	(Argentina) F Díaz Acosta	6	6

=== Bottom half ===
First round
8	(Italy) L Darderi	4	6^{3}
Q	(Brazil) J Pereira	6	7^{7}
(Spain) José Francisco Vidal Azorín	6	6^{2}	5
Q	(Argentina) FA Gómez	3	7^{7}	7
(Argentina) JB Torres	6	6
(United States) S Kirchheimer	1	2
(Argentina) MF Descotte	5	6^{4}
4	(Chile) G Lama	7	7^{7}
5	(Argentina) H Casanova	6	6
(Argentina) Facundo Juárez	4	1
(Brazil) D Dutra da Silva	6^{5}	2
(United States) N Rubin	7^{7}	6
(Argentina) JP Paz	6	7
Q	(Argentina) Leonardo Aboian	3	5
(Germany) M Rosenkranz	3	6	3
2	(Argentina) S Rodríguez Taverna	6	3	6

Second round
Q	(Brazil) J Pereira	6	6
Q	(Argentina) FA Gómez	4	3
(Argentina) JB Torres	6	3	3
4	(Chile) G Lama	3	6	6
5	(Argentina) H Casanova	6	2	6
(United States) N Rubin	3	6	2
(Argentina) JP Paz	5	6^{5}
2	(Argentina) S Rodríguez Taverna	7	7^{7}

Quarterfinals
Q	(Brazil) J Pereira	7^{7}	1	4
4	(Chile) G Lama	6^{1}	6	6
5	(Argentina) H Casanova	5	4
2	(Argentina) S Rodríguez Taverna	7	6

Semifinals
4	(Chile) G Lama	1	3
2	(Argentina) S Rodríguez Taverna	6	6
