= 2023 Challenger de Tigre II – Doubles =

Doubles
- 2023 Challenger de Tigre II

Final
- Champions: (Brazil) Daniel Dutra da Silva (Ukraine) Oleg Prihodko
- Runners-up: (South Korea) Chung Yun-seong (United States) Christian Langmo
- Score: 6–2, 6–2

Events
Singles	Doubles
- Challenger de Tigre

Guido Andreozzi and Ignacio Carou were the defending champions but lost in the semifinals to Chung Yun-seong and Christian Langmo.

Daniel Dutra da Silva and Oleg Prihodko won the title after defeating Chung and Langmo 6–2, 6–2 in the final.

== Seeds ==
1. (Bolivia) Boris Arias / (Bolivia) Federico Zeballos (first round)
2. (Poland) Karol Drzewiecki / (Poland) Piotr Matuszewski (quarterfinals)
3. (Argentina) Guido Andreozzi / (Uruguay) Ignacio Carou (semifinals)
4. (Brazil) Daniel Dutra da Silva / (Ukraine) Oleg Prihodko (champions)

== Draw ==
Key

- Q = Qualifier
- WC = Wild card
- LL = Lucky loser
- Alt = Alternate
- ITF = ITF entry
- PR = Protected ranking
- SR = Special ranking
- SE = Special exempt
- JE = Junior exempt
- JR = Junior Accelerator Programme entrant
- CO = College Accelerator Programme entrant
- NG = Next Gen Accelerator Program entrant
- w/o = Walkover
- r = Retired
- d = Defaulted

First round
1	(Bolivia) B Arias (Bolivia) F Zeballos	2	3
Alt	(South Korea) Y-s Chung (United States) Christian Langmo	6	6
(Argentina) M Navone (Argentina) JP Paz	6	6
(Argentina) H Casanova (Spain) C Sánchez Jover	3	2
3	(Argentina) G Andreozzi (Uruguay) I Carou	6	6
(Argentina) F Comesaña (Argentina) JB Torres	3	3
(Spain) O Roca Batalla (Germany) Timo Stodder	6	6
(Argentina) Juan Ignacio Galarza (Argentina) T Lipovšek Puches	1	2
WC	(Argentina) LE Ambrogi (Argentina) Mateo del Pino	2	6^{5}
(Italy) Edoardo Lavagno (United States) E Zhu	6	7^{7}
(Argentina) A Collarini (Uruguay) M Cuevas	6^{4}	4
4	(Brazil) D Dutra da Silva (Ukraine) O Prihodko	7^{7}	6
(Peru) A Huertas del Pino (Peru) C Huertas del Pino	6	6
WC	(Argentina) Romeo Arcuschin (Argentina) Máximo Zeitune	2	2
(Peru) A Merino (Switzerland) J Paul	3	6	[5]
2	(Poland) K Drzewiecki (Poland) P Matuszewski	6	1	[10]

Quarterfinals
Alt	(South Korea) Y-s Chung (United States) C Langmo	6	6
(Argentina) M Navone (Argentina) JP Paz	4	4
3	(Argentina) G Andreozzi (Uruguay) I Carou	6	7
(Spain) O Roca Batalla (Germany) T Stodder	4	5
(Italy) E Lavagno (United States) E Zhu	1	3
4	(Brazil) D Dutra da Silva (Ukraine) O Prihodko	6	6
(Peru) A Huertas del Pino (Peru) C Huertas del Pino	4	6	[10]
2	(Poland) K Drzewiecki (Poland) P Matuszewski	6	1	[8]

Semifinals
Alt	(South Korea) Y-s Chung (United States) C Langmo	6	7
3	(Argentina) G Andreozzi (Uruguay) I Carou	4	5
4	(Brazil) D Dutra da Silva (Ukraine) O Prihodko	6	6
(Peru) A Huertas del Pino (Peru) C Huertas del Pino	4	3

Final
Alt	(South Korea) Y-s Chung (United States) C Langmo	2	2
4	(Brazil) D Dutra da Silva (Ukraine) O Prihodko	6	6
