= 2023 Challenger de Tigre II =

- Date: 9 – 15 January
- Edition: 4th
- Surface: Clay
- Location: Tigre, Argentina

Champions

Singles
- (Argentina) Juan Manuel Cerúndolo

Doubles
- (Brazil) Daniel Dutra da Silva / (Ukraine) Oleg Prihodko
← 2023 ·	Challenger de Tigre	· 2025 →

The 2023 Challenger de Tigre II was a professional tennis tournament played on clay courts. It was the fourth edition of the tournament which was part of the 2023 ATP Challenger Tour. It took place in Tigre, Argentina between 9 and 15 January 2023.

== Singles main-draw entrants ==
=== Seeds ===
Country	Player	Rank^{1}	Seed
ARG	Camilo Ugo Carabelli	126	1
ARG	Juan Manuel Cerúndolo	151	2
ARG	Mariano Navone	243	3
ARG	Andrea Collarini	246	4
ARG	Juan Bautista Torres	253	5
ARG	Hernán Casanova	257	6
ITA	Alessandro Giannessi	262	7
ESP	Oriol Roca Batalla	268	8

- ^{1} Rankings are as of 2 January 2023.

=== Other entrants ===
The following players received wildcards into the singles main draw:

- (Argentina) Valerio Aboian
- (Argentina) Tomás Farjat
- (Argentina) Camilo Ugo Carabelli

The following players received entry into the singles main draw as alternates:

- (Switzerland) Rémy Bertola
- (Tunisia) Moez Echargui

The following players received entry from the qualifying draw:

- (France) Jurgen Briand
- (Argentina) Matías Franco Descotte
- (Italy) Edoardo Lavagno
- (Ukraine) Oleg Prihodko
- (Spain) Carlos Sánchez Jover
- (Brazil) Thiago Seyboth Wild

== Champions ==
=== Singles ===
- (Argentina) Juan Manuel Cerúndolo def. (Netherlands) Jesper de Jong 6–3, 2–6, 6–2.

=== Doubles ===
- (Brazil) Daniel Dutra da Silva / (Ukraine) Oleg Prihodko def. (South Korea) Chung Yun-seong / (United States) Christian Langmo 6–2, 6–2.
