= 2022 Challenger de Tigre II =

- Date: 25 April–2 May
- Edition: 2nd
- Surface: Clay
- Location: Tigre, Argentina

Champions

Singles
- (Argentina) Camilo Ugo Carabelli

Doubles
- (Argentina) Guillermo Durán / (Brazil) Felipe Meligeni Alves
- Challenger de Tigre

The 2022 Challenger de Tigre II was a professional tennis tournament played on clay courts. It was the second edition of the tournament which was part of the 2022 ATP Challenger Tour. It took place in Tigre, Argentina between 25 April and 2 May 2022.

== Singles main-draw entrants ==
=== Seeds ===
Country	Player	Rank^{1}	Seed
ARG	Facundo Bagnis	99	1
PER	Juan Pablo Varillas	109	2
ARG	Camilo Ugo Carabelli	168	3
ARG	Renzo Olivo	169	4
BRA	Felipe Meligeni Alves	190	5
ARG	Nicolás Kicker	201	6
ARG	Santiago Rodríguez Taverna	206	7
BRA	João Menezes	251	8

- ^{1} Rankings are as of 18 April 2022.

=== Other entrants ===
The following players received wildcards into the singles main draw:

- (Argentina) Facundo Bagnis
- (Argentina) Román Andrés Burruchaga
- (Argentina) Alejo Lorenzo Lingua Lavallén

The following players received entry into the singles main draw as alternates:

- (Brazil) Gustavo Heide
- (Colombia) Cristian Rodríguez

The following players received entry from the qualifying draw:

- (Israel) Daniel Cukierman
- (Bolivia) Murkel Dellien
- (Argentina) Franco Emanuel Egea
- (Argentina) Santiago de la Fuente
- (Argentina) Juan Ignacio Galarza
- (Peru) Conner Huertas del Pino

== Champions ==
=== Singles ===
- (Argentina) Camilo Ugo Carabelli def. (Argentina) Andrea Collarini 7–5, 6–2.

=== Doubles ===
- (Argentina) Guillermo Durán / (Brazil) Felipe Meligeni Alves def. (Italy) Luciano Darderi / (Argentina) Juan Bautista Torres 3–6, 6–4, [10–3].
