= 2022 Challenger de Tigre =

- Date: 3–9 January
- Edition: 1st
- Surface: Clay
- Location: Tigre, Argentina

Champions

Singles
- (Argentina) Santiago Rodríguez Taverna

Doubles
- (Peru) Conner Huertas del Pino / (Germany) Mats Rosenkranz
- Challenger de Tigre

The 2022 Challenger de Tigre was a professional tennis tournament played on clay courts. It was the first edition of the tournament which was part of the 2022 ATP Challenger Tour. It took place in Tigre, Argentina between 3 and 9 January 2022.

== Singles main-draw entrants ==
=== Seeds ===
Country	Player	Rank^{1}	Seed
ARG	Guido Andreozzi	271	1
ARG	Santiago Rodríguez Taverna	302	2
ARG	Genaro Alberto Olivieri	313	3
CHI	Gonzalo Lama	322	4
ARG	Hernán Casanova	325	5
ESP	Carlos Gimeno Valero	329	6
ARG	Facundo Díaz Acosta	338	7
ITA	Luciano Darderi	341	8

- ^{1} Rankings are as of 27 December 2021.

=== Other entrants ===
The following players received wildcards into the singles main draw:

- (Argentina) Valerio Aboian
- (Argentina) Juan Manuel La Serna
- (Argentina) Lautaro Midón

The following player received entry into the singles main draw as an alternate:

- (Argentina) Mariano Kestelboim

The following players received entry from the qualifying draw:

- (Argentina) Leonardo Aboian
- (Netherlands) Alec Deckers
- (Bolivia) Murkel Dellien
- (Argentina) Federico Agustín Gómez
- (Slovenia) Tomás Lipovšek Puches
- (Brazil) José Pereira

== Champions ==
=== Singles ===
- (Argentina) Santiago Rodríguez Taverna def. (Argentina) Facundo Díaz Acosta 6–4, 6–2.

=== Doubles ===
- (Peru) Conner Huertas del Pino / (Germany) Mats Rosenkranz def. (Argentina) Matías Franco Descotte / (Argentina) Facundo Díaz Acosta 5–6 retired.
