= 2023 Challenger de Tigre – Singles =

Singles
- 2023 Challenger de Tigre

Final
- Champion: (Argentina) Juan Manuel Cerúndolo
- Runner-up: (Bolivia) Murkel Dellien
- Score: 4–6, 6–4, 6–2

Events
| Singles | Doubles |
- Challenger de Tigre

Camilo Ugo Carabelli was the defending champion but chose not to defend his title.

Juan Manuel Cerúndolo won the title after defeating Murkel Dellien 4–6, 6–4, 6–2 in the final.

== Seeds ==
1. (Argentina) Juan Manuel Cerúndolo (champion)
2. (Argentina) Andrea Collarini (first round)
3. (Argentina) Juan Bautista Torres (first round)
4. (Argentina) Hernán Casanova (second round)
5. (Italy) Alessandro Giannessi (semifinals)
6. (Spain) Oriol Roca Batalla (first round)
7. (Argentina) Francisco Comesaña (first round)
8. (Argentina) Juan Ignacio Londero (quarterfinals)

== Draw ==
Key

- Q = Qualifier
- WC = Wild card
- LL = Lucky loser
- Alt = Alternate
- ITF = ITF entry
- PR = Protected ranking
- SR = Special ranking
- SE = Special exempt
- JE = Junior exempt
- JR = Junior Accelerator Programme entrant
- CO = College Accelerator Programme entrant
- NG = Next Gen Accelerator Program entrant
- w/o = Walkover
- r = Retired
- d = Defaulted

=== Finals ===
Semifinals
1 | (Argentina) Juan Manuel Cerúndolo | 6 | 7
5 | (Italy) Alessandro Giannessi | 3 | 5
(Bolivia) Murkel Dellien | 6 | 6
(Argentina) Gonzalo Villanueva | 4 | 0

Final
1 | (Argentina) Juan Manuel Cerúndolo | 4 | 6 | 6
(Bolivia) Murkel Dellien | 6 | 4 | 2

=== Top half ===
First round
1 | (Argentina) JM Cerúndolo | 6 | 6
(France) T Droguet | 4 | 2
Q | (Brazil) T Seyboth Wild | 7^{7} | 6
(Germany) Timo Stodder | 6^{4} | 2
(Netherlands) J de Jong | 6 | 6
Q | (Argentina) JP Paz | 1 | 3
WC | (Argentina) G Andreozzi | 1 | 6 | 7^{7}
7 | (Argentina) F Comesaña | 6 | 2 | 6^{5}
4 | (Argentina) H Casanova | 7 | 6
(Tunisia) M Echargui | 5 | 1
(Italy) Edoardo Lavagno | 6^{4} | 4
WC | (Argentina) L Midón | 7^{7} | 6
Andrey Chepelev | 5
(Brazil) P Boscardin Dias | 2^{r}
WC | (Argentina) LE Ambrogi | 5 | 0
5 | (Italy) A Giannessi | 7 | 6

Second round
1 | (Argentina) JM Cerúndolo | 3 | 6 | 6
Q | (Brazil) T Seyboth Wild | 6 | 1 | 4
(Netherlands) J de Jong | 6 | 4 | 4
WC | (Argentina) G Andreozzi | 2 | 6 | 6
4 | (Argentina) H Casanova | 3 | 3
WC | (Argentina) L Midón | 6 | 6
A Chepelev | 4 | 4
5 | (Italy) A Giannessi | 6 | 6

Quarterfinals
1 | (Argentina) JM Cerúndolo | 6 | 6
WC | (Argentina) G Andreozzi | 3 | 1
WC | (Argentina) L Midón | 5 | 1
5 | (Italy) A Giannessi | 7 | 6

Semifinals
1 | (Argentina) JM Cerúndolo | 6 | 7
5 | (Italy) A Giannessi | 3 | 5

=== Bottom half ===
First round
8 | (Argentina) JI Londero | 6 | 6
(France) Mathys Erhard | 0 | 4
(Brazil) D Dutra da Silva | 7^{7} | 6
(United States) E Zhu | 6^{4} | 2
Q | (Spain) C Sánchez Jover | 6 | 6
(Italy) Alexander Weis | 4 | 2
(Bolivia) M Dellien | 6 | 1 | 7^{10}
3 | (Argentina) JB Torres | 1 | 6 | 6^{8}
6 | (Spain) O Roca Batalla | 2 | 6 | 3
(Argentina) G Villanueva | 6 | 2 | 6
(Switzerland) R Bertola | 6 | 2 | 6
Q | (Argentina) MF Descotte | 3 | 6 | 4
(France) T Atmane | 6 | 3 | 6^{7}
Q | (Argentina) A Barrena | 1 | 6 | 7^{9}
Q | (Argentina) V Aboian | 5 | 6 | 7^{7}
2 | (Argentina) A Collarini | 7 | 1 | 6^{3}

Second round
8 | (Argentina) JI Londero | 6 | 6
(Brazil) D Dutra da Silva | 2 | 4
Q | (Spain) C Sánchez Jover | 6^{5} | 2
(Bolivia) M Dellien | 7^{7} | 6
(Argentina) G Villanueva | 6 | 6
(Switzerland) R Bertola | 2 | 3
Q | (Argentina) A Barrena | 6^{1} | 6 | 2
Q | (Argentina) V Aboian | 7^{7} | 3 | 6

Quarterfinals
8 | (Argentina) JI Londero | 1 | 3
(Bolivia) M Dellien | 6 | 6
(Argentina) G Villanueva | 7 | 6^{5} | 6
Q | (Argentina) V Aboian | 5 | 7^{7} | 4

Semifinals
(Bolivia) M Dellien | 6 | 6
(Argentina) G Villanueva | 4 | 0
