= 2026 Challenger de Tigre =

- Date: 16 – 22 February
- Edition: 6th
- Surface: Clay
- Location: Tigre, Argentina

Champions

Singles
- (Argentina) Guido Iván Justo

Doubles
- (Argentina) Mariano Kestelboim / (Bolivia) Juan Carlos Prado Ángelo
- Challenger de Tigre

The 2026 AAT Challenger Santander edición Tigre was a professional tennis tournament played on clay courts. It was the sixth edition of the tournament which was part of the 2026 ATP Challenger Tour. It took place in Tigre, Argentina between 16 and 22 February 2026.

== Singles main-draw entrants ==
=== Seeds ===
Country	Player	Rank^{1}	Seed
ECU	Álvaro Guillén Meza	202	1
PER	Gonzalo Bueno	218	2
ARG	Genaro Alberto Olivieri	227	3
ARG	Santiago Rodríguez Taverna	228	4
ARG	Lautaro Midón	229	5
ARG	Andrea Collarini	233	6
ITA	Franco Agamenone	260	7
ARG	Nicolás Kicker	267	8

- ^{1} Rankings are as of 9 February 2026.

=== Other entrants ===
The following players received wildcards into the singles main draw:

- (Argentina) Dante Pagani
- (Argentina) Lucio Ratti
- (Argentina) Carlos María Zárate

The following players received entry into the singles main draw as alternates:

- (Argentina) Luciano Emanuel Ambrogi
- (Argentina) Mariano Kestelboim

The following players received entry from the qualifying draw:

- (Uruguay) Joaquín Aguilar Cardozo
- (Brazil) Bruno Fernandez
- (Romania) Ștefan Paloși
- (Brazil) João Eduardo Schiessl
- (Brazil) Nicolas Zanellato
- (Argentina) Máximo Zeitune

== Champions ==
=== Singles ===
- (Argentina) Guido Iván Justo def. (Argentina) Lautaro Midón 4–6, 6–3, 6–0.

=== Doubles ===
- (Argentina) Mariano Kestelboim / (Bolivia) Juan Carlos Prado Ángelo def. (Argentina) Santiago Rodríguez Taverna / (Argentina) Gonzalo Villanueva 6–4, 5–7, [10–7].
