= 2023 Challenger de Tigre =

- Date: 2 – 8 January
- Edition: 3rd
- Surface: Clay
- Location: Tigre, Argentina

Champions

Singles
- (Argentina) Juan Manuel Cerúndolo

Doubles
- (Argentina) Guido Andreozzi / (Uruguay) Ignacio Carou
- Challenger de Tigre

The 2023 Challenger de Tigre was a professional tennis tournament played on clay courts. It was the third edition of the tournament which was part of the 2023 ATP Challenger Tour. It took place in Tigre, Argentina between 2 and 8 January 2023.

== Singles main-draw entrants ==
=== Seeds ===
Country	Player	Rank^{1}	Seed
ARG	Juan Manuel Cerúndolo	151	1
ARG	Andrea Collarini	246	2
ARG	Juan Bautista Torres	253	3
ARG	Hernán Casanova	257	4
ITA	Alessandro Giannessi	262	5
ESP	Oriol Roca Batalla	268	6
ARG	Francisco Comesaña	271	7
ARG	Juan Ignacio Londero	276	8

- ^{1} Rankings are as of 26 December 2022.

=== Other entrants ===
The following players received wildcards into the singles main draw:

- (Argentina) Luciano Emanuel Ambrogi
- (Argentina) Guido Andreozzi
- (Argentina) Lautaro Midón

The following players received entry from the qualifying draw:

- (Argentina) Valerio Aboian
- (Argentina) Alex Barrena
- (Argentina) Matías Franco Descotte
- (Argentina) Juan Pablo Paz
- (Spain) Carlos Sánchez Jover
- (Brazil) Thiago Seyboth Wild

== Champions ==
=== Singles ===
- (Argentina) Juan Manuel Cerúndolo def. (Bolivia) Murkel Dellien 4–6, 6–4, 6–2.

=== Doubles ===
- (Argentina) Guido Andreozzi / (Uruguay) Ignacio Carou def. (Argentina) Leonardo Aboian / (Argentina) Ignacio Monzón 5–7, 6–4, [10–5].
