= 2025 Challenger de Tigre =

- Date: 13 – 19 January
- Edition: 5th
- Surface: Clay
- Location: Tigre, Argentina

Champions

Singles
- (Peru) Juan Pablo Varillas

Doubles
- (Argentina) Mariano Kestelboim / (Argentina) Gonzalo Villanueva
- Challenger de Tigre

The 2025 AAT Challenger Santander edición Tigre was a professional tennis tournament played on clay courts. It was the fifth edition of the tournament which was part of the 2025 ATP Challenger Tour. It took place in Tigre, Argentina between 13 and 19 January 2025.

== Singles main-draw entrants ==
=== Seeds ===
Country	Player	Rank^{1}	Seed
ARG	Román Andrés Burruchaga	152	1
BOL	Murkel Dellien	186	2
ARG	Andrea Collarini	206	3
PER	Juan Pablo Varillas	212	4
USA	Emilio Nava	213	5
ARG	Facundo Mena	221	6
PAR	Daniel Vallejo	233	7
PER	Gonzalo Bueno	240	8

- ^{1} Rankings are as of 6 January 2025.

=== Other entrants ===
The following players received wildcards into the singles main draw:

- (Argentina) Lautaro Midón
- (Argentina) Ezequiel Monferrer
- (Argentina) Máximo Zeitune

The following player received entry into the singles main draw using a protected ranking:

- (Argentina) Nicolás Kicker

The following player received entry into the singles main draw as an alternate:

- (Spain) Àlex Martí Pujolràs

The following players received entry from the qualifying draw:

- (Argentina) Luciano Emanuel Ambrogi
- (Italy) Marco Cecchinato
- (France) Maxime Chazal
- (Argentina) Mariano Kestelboim
- (Brazil) João Lucas Reis da Silva
- (Argentina) Gonzalo Villanueva

== Champions ==
=== Singles ===
- (Peru) Juan Pablo Varillas def. (Paraguay) Daniel Vallejo 6–4, 6–4.

=== Doubles ===
- (Argentina) Mariano Kestelboim / (Argentina) Gonzalo Villanueva def. (Brazil) Luís Britto / (Uruguay) Franco Roncadelli 6–2, 7–5.
