= Juan Manuel Cerúndolo =

Argentine tennis player (born 2001)

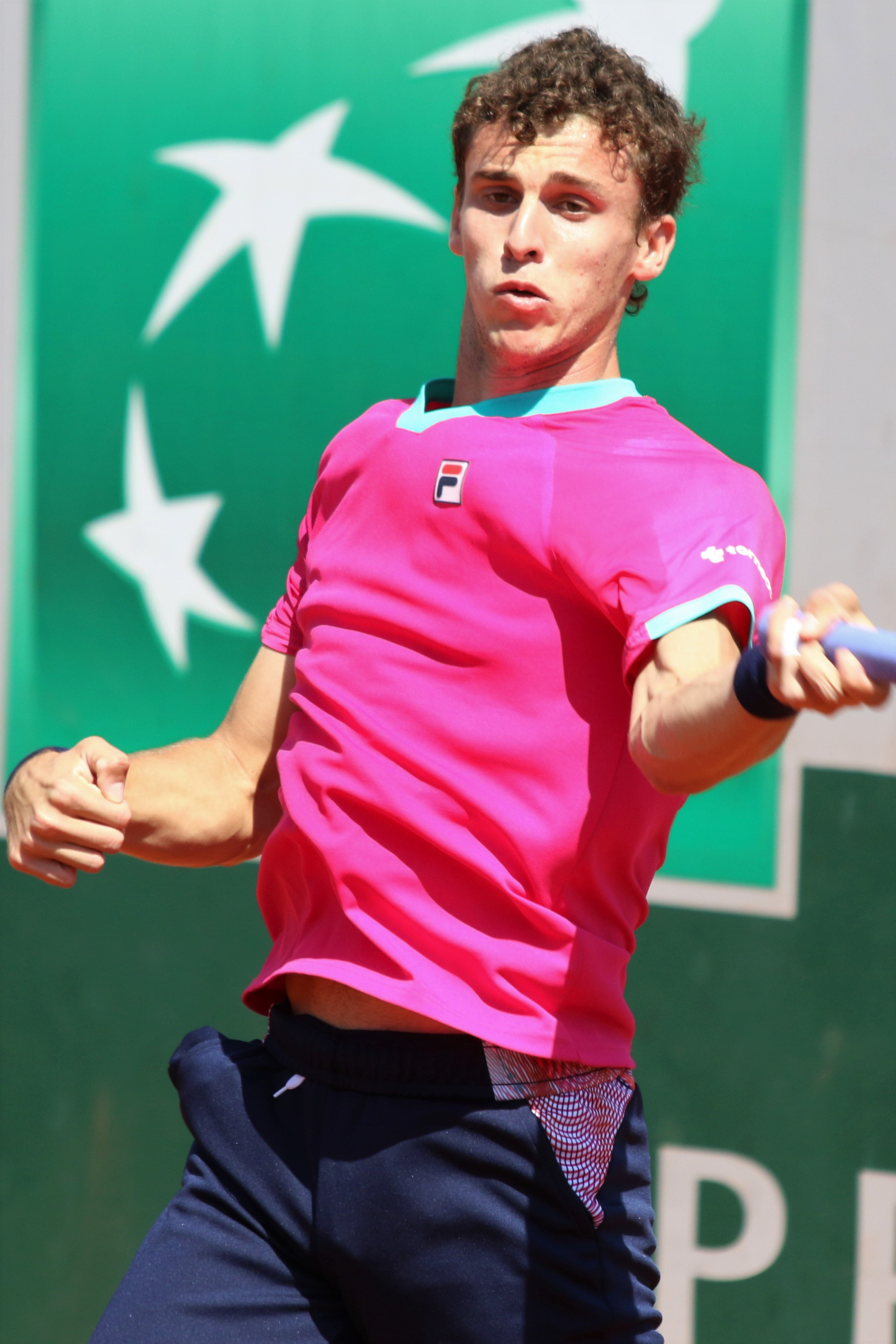
- Cerúndolo at the 2022 French Open
- Country (sports): Argentina
- Residence: Buenos Aires, Argentina
- Born: 15 November 2001 (age 24) Buenos Aires, Argentina
- Height: 1.83 m (6 ft 0 in)
- Turned pro: 2018
- Plays: Left-handed (two-handed backhand)
- Coach: Andres Dellatorre; Alejandro Cerúndolo; Sebastian Prieto; Kevin Konfederak; Valentin Florez
- Prize money: US $2,712,197

Singles
- Career record: 43–51
- Career titles: 1
- Highest ranking: No. 42 (29 June 2026)
- Current ranking: No. 54 (9 November 2026)

Grand Slam singles results
- Australian Open: 1R (2022, 2026)
- French Open: 4R (2026)
- Wimbledon: 1R (2023, 2026)
- US Open: 2R (2023)

Doubles
- Career record: 2–4
- Career titles: 0
- Highest ranking: No. 376 (3 February 2020)
- Current ranking: No. 493 (31 August 2026)

Grand Slam doubles results
- Australian Open: 2R (2026)
- French Open: 1R (2026)
- US Open: 1R (2026)
- Last updated on: 1 September 2026.

Juan Manuel Cerúndolo (Italian: [tʃeˈrundolo]; born 15 November 2001) is an Argentine professional tennis player. He has a career-high ATP singles ranking of world No. 42 achieved on 29 June 2026 and a best doubles ranking of No. 376, reached on 3 February 2020.

Cerúndolo has won one ATP Tour singles title.

== Professional career ==
=== 2020–21: First ATP title, Top 100 debut, NextGen finals debut ===
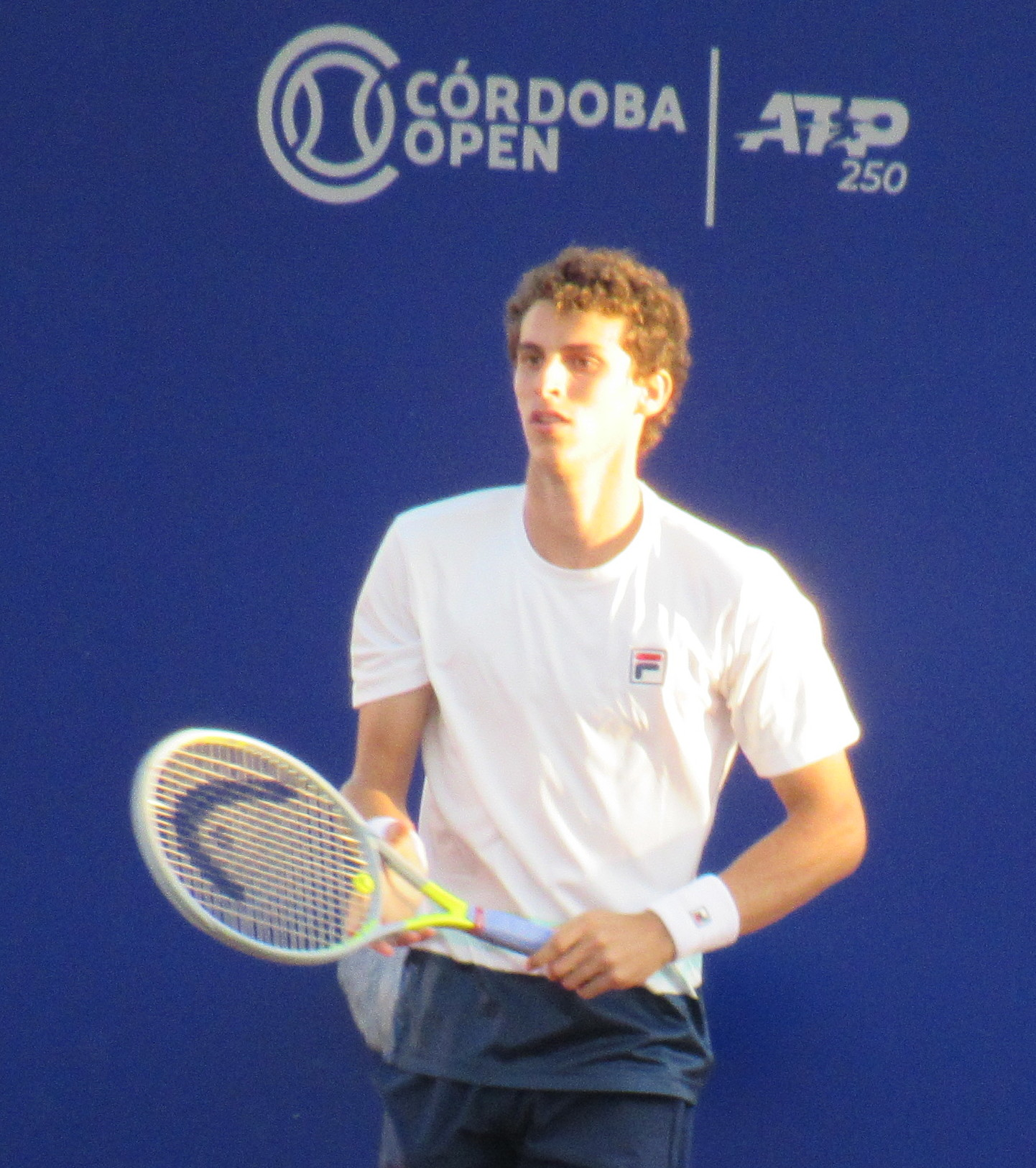
Cerúndolo at the Córdoba Open

Cerúndolo made his ATP main draw debut at the 2021 Córdoba Open where, as a qualifier, he won the title. The world No. 335 was the fifth lowest ranked player to win an ATP Tour title since 1990 and the youngest Argentine tennis player to reach an ATP final since José Acasuso in 2001 and win an ATP tournament since Guillermo Coria in 2001, and the first player to win a title in his debut ATP event since Santiago Ventura in 2004.

In May 2021, Juan Manuel won his first challenger title on clay in an all-teenage final at the 2021 Garden Open II Challenger in Rome. He was the youngest Argentine champion on the ATP Challenger Tour in 12 years since Federico Delbonis and the first player to win on both tours in the same season since 2019. As a result, he reached a career-high ranking of World No. 152 in singles on 3 May 2021 and 2 weeks later entered the top 150 at No. 146.

In August and September, he won his second and third Challengers in Como, Italy and Banja Luka, Bosnia and Herzegovina. He made his debut in the top 100 after a semifinal showing at the Challenger in Buenos Aires at World No. 94 on 25 October 2021 becoming only the fourth teenager to crack the top 100 rankings in 2021. He was the first from the South American nation to be in the Top 100 while under the age of 20, since Juan Martín del Potro in 2006. In addition, Cerundolo was only the seventh Argentine teen to reach the Top 100 since 1990, along with 18-year-olds Del Potro, José Acasuso and Guillermo Coria and 19-year-olds David Nalbandian, Mariano Puerta and Mariano Zabaleta.

After Félix Auger-Aliassime withdrew from the 2021 Next Generation ATP Finals, the ATP announced Cerúndolo as the next qualifier on 1 November 2021. He was the first player from South America to qualify in the tournament's history.

In his Next Gen ATP finals debut, Cerúndolo lost to fourth seed Brandon Nakashima in his first match. He then was defeated by seventh seed Holger Rune. His third and final match ended in defeat to the tournament's top seed and eventual champion Carlos Alcaraz.

=== 2022: Major, Masters debut and third round, hiatus ===
Cerúndolo made his Grand Slam debut at the 2022 Australian Open as a direct entry into the main draw where he lost to qualifier Tomáš Macháč. He reached the top 80 on 17 January 2022. After suffering a leg injury that made him unable to defend his title at the Córdoba Open, he lost in the first round of both the 2022 Chile Open and the Indian Wells Open to Carlos Taberner and Jack Sock respectively.

At the 2022 Miami Open, Cerundolo reached the third round, getting past Dušan Lajović and former top-10 player lucky loser Kevin Anderson (replacing top-10 player Matteo Berrettini who withdrew from the tournament). He was defeated by Frances Tiafoe. He did not play in any of the ATP tournaments on clay due to leg and hip injuries and as result dropped out of the top 130 to No. 132 on 16 May 2022. He also skipped the entire grass season including Wimbledon and the North American tournaments including the US Open. When he returned later in September, he triumphed at the Buenos Aires and Coquimbo Challengers.

=== 2023–24: Wimbledon & US Open debuts & first major win ===
Cerúndolo won the 2023 Challenger de Tigre in Argentina defeating Bolivian Murkel Dellien.

In Córdoba Open, Argentina, he received a wildcard and defeated compatriot and top-seed Diego Schwartzman to reach the quarterfinals. With the victory, he improved to 10–0 at this ATP 250 (including his three qualifying wins in 2021). At the 2023 Rio Open he qualified but lost to eventual champion Cameron Norrie. In Santiago he also qualified into the main draw and defeated Pedro Cachin in the first round.

Cerúndolo made his debut at the 2023 Wimbledon Championships as a direct entry into the main draw. He recorded his first Major win on his debut at the US Open defeating Ilya Ivashka in five sets.

=== 2025: First Masters clay wins & third round, ATP final, back to top 100 ===
Ranked No. 126 at the 2025 Mutua Madrid Open, Cerúndolo qualified for the main draw, making his debut at the tournament, and recorded his first Masters win on clay over Aleksandar Kovacevic. Next he defeated previous year runner-up Félix Auger-Aliassime to reach the third round of a clay Masters for the first time and only the second time at this level. Cerúndolo qualified for the main draw of the 2025 French Open and upset 32nd seed Alex Michelsen, recording his first win at the tournament.

At the 2025 Swiss Open Cerúndolo reached his second final on the ATP Tour, upsetting sixth seed David Goffin and top seed and world No. 13 Casper Ruud, the biggest win of his career, before defeating Ignacio Buse in the semifinal. He was defeated in three sets by second seed Alexander Bublik in the final. As a result, Cerúndolo returned to the top 100 in the singles rankings, since October 2023, on 21 July 2025.

=== 2026: Win over World No. 1, Major fourth round, top 50 ===
At the 2026 French Open, despite trailing by two sets and 1–5 in the third set, Cerúndolo came back to upset world No. 1 Jannik Sinner in the second round. Sinner's loss ended a streak of nine consecutive major titles won between him and Alcaraz, dating back to the 2024 Australian Open, as well as a career-best winning streak of 30 matches. This marked the first time the incumbent world No. 1 failed to reach the third round of the French Open since Andre Agassi in 2000. It was the first time Sinner lost before the third round of a major since the 2023 French Open. He reached the fourth round defeating Martín Landaluce. At 5 hours and 58 minutes, the match was the longest match at the French Open since the first round encounter between Corentin Moutet and Lorenzo Giustino in 2020. It was the third longest match in the tournament's history, and also the longest since the super tiebreak was introduced in the final set in 2022.

== Personal life ==
Cerúndolo is the younger brother of fellow tennis player, Francisco. In 2021, the brothers became the first to reach back-to-back finals on the ATP Tour since 2017, when Alexander Zverev won the title in Rome and Mischa Zverev reached the final in Geneva. The brothers also reached the third round of the 2026 French Open the same day, marking the third time in the Open Era that this occurred, following Gene Mayer and Sandy Mayer in 1979, and the Zverev brothers in 2018.

== Performance timelines ==
Key
W	F	SF	QF	#R	RR	Q#	DNQ	A	NH

(W) winner; (F) finalist; (SF) semifinalist; (QF) quarterfinalist; (#R) rounds 4, 3, 2, 1; (RR) round-robin stage; (Q#) qualification round; (DNQ) did not qualify; (A) absent; (NH) not held; (SR) strike rate (events won / competed); (W–L) win–loss record.
To avoid confusion and double counting, these charts are updated at the conclusion of a tournament or when the player's participation has ended.

=== Singles ===
Tournament	2021	2022	2023	2024	2025	2026	SR	W–L	Win %
Grand Slam tournaments
Australian Open	A	1R	A	Q1	Q1	1R	0 / 2	0–2	0%
French Open	Q3	Q2	Q2	Q2	2R	4R	0 / 2	4–2	67%
Wimbledon	Q1	A	1R	A	Q1	1R	0 / 2	0–2	0%
US Open	A	A	2R	Q1	Q2	1R	0 / 2	1–2	33%
Win–loss	0–0	0–1	1–2	0–0	1–1	3–4	0 / 8	5–8	38%
ATP Tour Masters 1000
Indian Wells Open	A	1R	A	A	A	2R (Note: Cerundolo withdrew before the second round of the 2026 Indian Wells Open, which does not officially count as a loss.)	0 / 2	1–1	50%
Miami Open	A	3R	A	A	A	A	0 / 1	2–1	67%
Monte-Carlo Masters	A	A	A	A	A	1R	0 / 1	0–1	0%
Madrid Open	A	A	Q2	A	3R	2R	0 / 2	3–2	60%
Italian Open	A	A	1R	A	Q2	1R	0 / 2	0–2	0%
Canadian Open	A	A	A	A	A	2R	0 / 1	1–1	50%
Cincinnati Open	A	A	A	A	Q1	3R	0 / 1	2–1	67%
Shanghai Masters	NH		A	A	1R	2R	0 / 2	1–2	33%
Paris Masters	A	A	A	A	A	1R	0 / 1	0–1	0%
Win–loss	0–0	2–2	0–1	0–0	2–2	6–7	0 / 13	10–12	45%
Career statistics
Tournaments	4	5	11	2	6	10	Career total: 38		
Titles	1	0	0	0	0		Career total: 1		
Finals	1	0	0	0	0		Career total: 1		
Overall win–loss	6–6	3–5	7–11	1–2	4–6	5–9	26–39		
Win Percentage	50%	38%	39%	33%	40%	36%	40%		
Year-end ranking	89	154	120	139	86		$2,712,197		

== ATP Tour finals ==
=== Singles: 2 (1 title, 1 runner-up) ===
Legend Grand Slam (–) ATP 1000 (–) ATP 500 (–) ATP 250 (1–1)	Finals by surface Hard (–) Clay (1–1) Grass (–)	Finals by setting Outdoor (1–1) Indoor (–)

Result	W–L	Date	Tournament	Tier	Surface	Opponent	Score
Win	1–0	Feb 2021	Córdoba Open, Argentina	ATP 250	Clay	(Spain) Albert Ramos Viñolas	6–0, 2–6, 6–2
Loss	1–1	Jul 2025	Swiss Open, Switzerland	ATP 250	Clay	(Kazakhstan) Alexander Bublik	4–6, 6–4, 3–6

== ATP Challenger Tour finals ==
=== Singles: 16 (12 titles, 4 runner-ups) ===
Legend ATP Challenger Tour (12–4)	Finals by surface Hard (1–0) Clay (11–4)

Result	W–L	Date	Tournament	Tier	Surface	Opponents	Score
Win	1–0	May 2021	Garden Open II, Italy	Challenger	Clay	(Italy) Flavio Cobolli	6–2, 3–6, 6–3
Loss	1–1	Aug 2021	Meerbusch Challenger, Germany	Challenger	Clay	(Chile) Marcelo Tomás Barrios Vera	6–7^{(7–9)}, 3–6
Win	2–1	Aug 2021	Città di Como Challenger, Italy	Challenger	Clay	(Italy) Gian Marco Moroni	7–5, 7–6^{(9–7)}
Win	3–1	Sep 2021	Banja Luka Challenger, Bosnia and Herzegovina	Challenger	Clay	(Serbia) Nikola Milojević	6–3, 6–1
Loss	3–2	Oct 2021	Lima Challenger II, Peru	Challenger	Clay	(Chile) Nicolás Jarry	2–6, 5–7
Win	4–2	Sep 2022	Challenger de Buenos Aires, Argentina	Challenger	Clay	(Argentina) Camilo Ugo Carabelli	6–4, 2–6, 7–5
Win	5–2	Oct 2022	Challenger Coquimbo II, Chile	Challenger	Clay	(Argentina) Facundo Díaz Acosta	6–3, 3–6, 6–4
Win	6–2	Jan 2023	Challenger de Tigre, Argentina	Challenger	Clay	(Bolivia) Murkel Dellien	4–6, 6–4, 6–2
Win	7–2	Jan 2023	Challenger de Tigre II, Argentina	Challenger	Clay	(Netherlands) Jesper de Jong	6–3, 2–6, 6–2
Loss	7–3	Apr 2023	Open de Oeiras, Portugal	Challenger	Clay	(Hungary) Zsombor Piros	3–6, 4–6
Win	8–3	Jun 2024	Lima Challenger, Peru	Challenger	Clay	(Brazil) Pedro Boscardin Dias	6–4, 6–3
Win	9–3	Jun 2024	Santa Cruz Challenger, Bolivia	Challenger	Clay	(Ecuador) Álvaro Guillén Meza	3–6, 6–1, 6–4
Win	10–3	Sep 2024	Antofagasta Challenger, Chile	Challenger	Clay	(Paraguay) Adolfo Daniel Vallejo	3–6, 6–2, 6–4
Loss	10–4	Jul 2025	Brawo Open, Germany	Challenger	Clay	(Argentina) Mariano Navone	3–6, 5–7
Win	11–4	Sep 2025	Guangzhou Tennis Open, China	Challenger	Hard	(Chile) Alejandro Tabilo	6–2, 6–3
Win	12–4	May 2026	BNP Paribas Primrose Bordeaux, France	Challenger	Clay	(Belgium) Raphaël Collignon	5–7, 6–1, 7–6^{(7–4)}

=== Doubles: 1 (runner-up) ===
Legend ATP Challenger Tour (0–1)

Result	W–L	Date	Tournament	Tier	Surface	Partner	Opponents	Score
Loss	0–1	Jan 2020	Punta Open, Uruguay	Challenger	Clay	(Argentina) Thiago Agustín Tirante	(Brazil) Orlando Luz (Brazil) Rafael Matos	4–6, 2–6

== ITF World Tennis Tour finals ==
=== Singles: 7 (3 titles, 4 runner-ups) ===
Legend ITF WTT (3–4)	Finals by surface Hard (–) Clay (3–4)

Result	W–L	Date	Tournament	Tier	Surface	Opponents	Score
Win	1–0	Jun 2019	M15 Tabarka, Tunisia	WTT	Clay	(France) Antoine Escoffier	6–4, 7–6^{(8–6)}
Loss	1–1	Aug 2019	M15 Baja, Hungary	WTT	Clay	(Hungary) Máté Valkusz	4–6, 6–4, 2–6
Win	2–1	Aug 2019	M15 Helsinki, Finland	WTT	Clay	(Finland) Patrik Niklas-Salminen	6–2, 6–3
Win	3–1	Sep 2019	M15 Santiago, Chile	WTT	Clay	(Argentina) Sebastián Báez	7–6^{(7–5)}, 6–1
Loss	3–2	Oct 2019	M15 Junín, Argentina	WTT	Clay	(Argentina) Hernán Casanova	2–6, 1–6
Loss	3–3	Mar 2020	M25 Buenos Aires, Argentina	WTT	Clay	(Argentina) Facundo Díaz Acosta	6–7^{(2–7)}, 5–7
Loss	3–4	Jan 2021	M15 Antalya, Turkey	WTT	Clay	(Italy) Giovanni Fonio	walkover

=== Doubles: 2 (1 title, 1 runner-up) ===
Legend ITF WTT (1–1)

Result	W–L	Date	Tournament	Tier	Surface	Partner	Opponents	Score
Loss	0–1	Aug 2019	M15 Baja, Hungary	WTT	Clay	(Argentina) Francisco Comesaña	(Czech Republic) Petr Hájek (Czech Republic) Ondřej Krstev	6–7^{(5–7)}, 3–6
Win	1–1	Jan 2021	M15 Antalya, Turkey	WTT	Clay	(Argentina) Pedro Cachín	(Ukraine) Vladyslav Orlov (Kazakhstan) Denis Yevseyev	7–5, 6–2

== Record against top 10 players ==
JM Cerúndolo's record against players who have been ranked in the top 10, with those who are active in boldface. Only ATP Tour main draw matches are considered:

Player	Record	Win %	Hard	Clay	Grass	Last match
Number 1 ranked players						
(Spain) **Carlos Alcaraz**	0–2	0%	0–2	–	–	Lost (3–6, 3–6) at 2026 Shanghai Masters
(Italy) **Jannik Sinner**	1–1	50%	–	1–0	0–1	Won (3–6, 2–6, 7–5, 6–1, 6–1) at 2026 French Open
(Russia) **Daniil Medvedev**	0–1	0%	–	0–1	–	Lost (2–6, 2–6) at 2025 Madrid Masters
Number 2 ranked players						
(Norway) **Casper Ruud**	2–2	50%	0–2	2–0	–	Lost (3–6, 2–6) at 2026 Paris Masters
Number 4 ranked players						
(Canada) **Félix Auger Aliassime**	1–1	50%	0–1	1–0	–	Lost (5–7, 1–6) at 2026 Cincinnati Open
Number 5 ranked players						
(South Africa) **Kevin Anderson**	1–0	100%	1–0	–	–	Won (7–6^{(9–7)}, 3–6, 6–3) at 2022 Miami Masters
(Italy) **Lorenzo Musetti**	0–2	0%	–	0–2	–	Lost (6–7^{(4–7)}, 6–7^{(4–7)}) at 2024 Cagliari Challenger
Number 6 ranked players						
(France) **Gaël Monfils**	0–1	0%	0–1	–	–	Lost (2–6, 1–6) at 2022 Adelaide 1
(Denmark) **Holger Rune**	0–1	0%	0–1	–	–	Lost (1–4, 2–4, 4–1, 1–4) at 2021 Next Generation ATP Finals
(Italy) **Matteo Berrettini**	0–1	0%	–	0–1	–	Lost (3–6, 6–7^{(2–7)}, 6–7^{(6–8)}) at 2026 French Open
Number 7 ranked players						
(Belgium) **David Goffin**	1–0	100%	–	1–0	–	Won (5–7, 6–4, 6–1) at 2025 Swiss Open
Number 8 ranked players						
(Argentina) **Diego Schwartzman**	1–0	100%	–	1–0	–	Won (7–6^{(8–6)}, 6–1) at 2023 Córdoba
(United Kingdom) **Cameron Norrie**	0–1	0%	–	0–1	–	Lost (5–7, 1–6) at 2023 Rio
(United States) **Jack Sock**	0–1	0%	0–1	–	–	Lost (1–6, 1–6) at 2022 Indian Wells Masters
Number 10 ranked players						
(United States) **Frances Tiafoe**	0–1	0%	0–1	–	–	Lost (3–6, 2–6) at 2022 Miami Masters
(Kazakhstan) **Alexander Bublik**	0–1	0%	–	0–1	–	Lost (4–6, 6–4, 3–6) at 2025 Swiss Open
**Total**	**7–14**	**33.33%**	**1–7** **(13%)**	**6–6** **(50%)**	**0–1** **(0%)**	*** Statistics correct as of 1 September 2026**

== Wins over top 10 players ==
- Cerúndolo has a 1–3 record against players who were, at the time the match was played, ranked in the top 10.

Season	2026	Total
Wins	1	1

#	Player	Rk	Event	Surface	Rd	Score	Rk	Ref
2026
1.	(Italy) Jannik Sinner	1	French Open, France	Clay	2R	3–6, 2–6, 7–5, 6–1, 6–1	56	
