= Guido Iván Justo =

Argentine tennis player (born 1997)

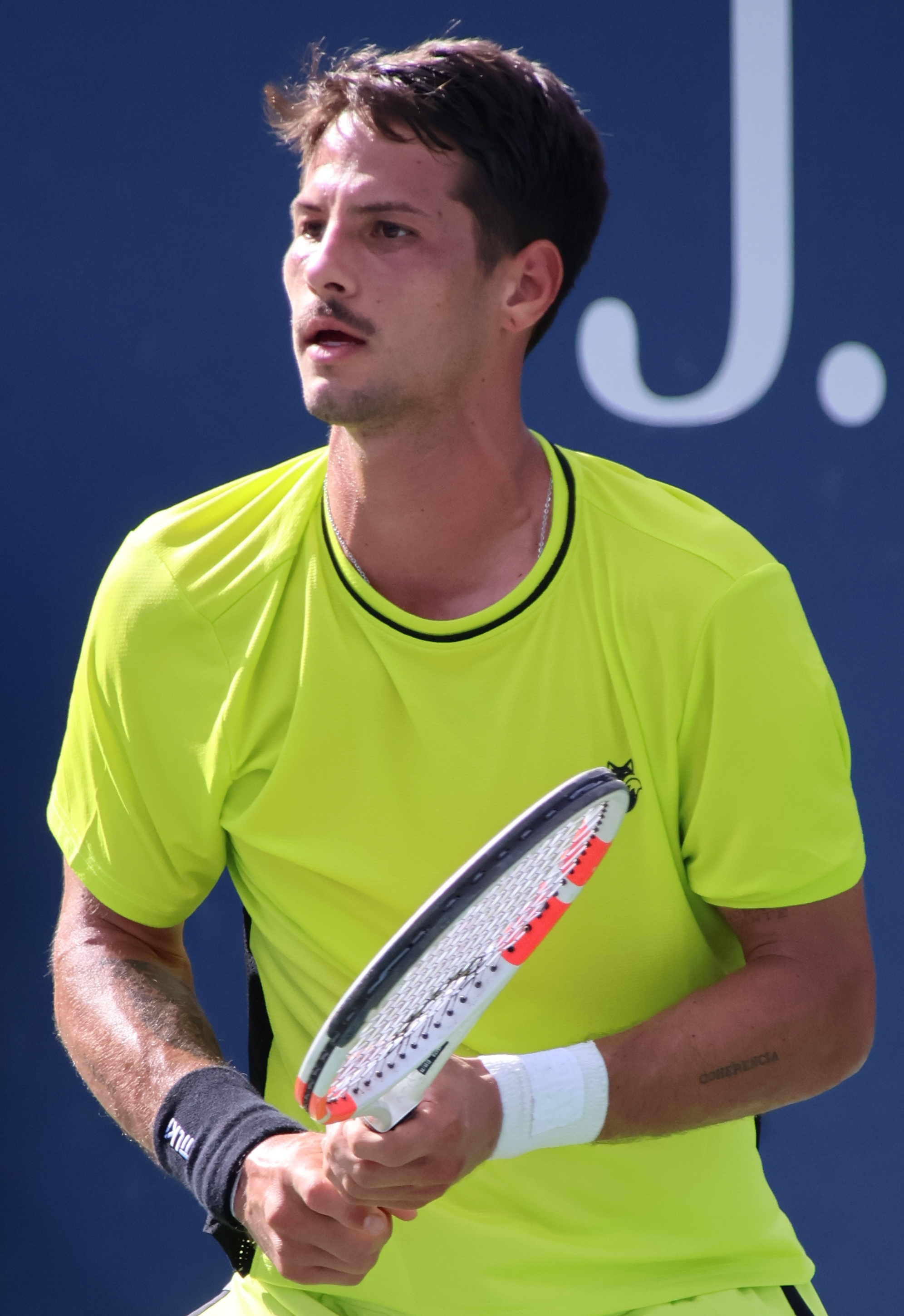
- Justo at the 2026 US Open
- Country (sports): Argentina
- Born: 17 December 1997 (age 28) Buenos Aires, Argentina
- Height: 1.78 m (5 ft 10 in)
- Plays: Right-handed (two-handed backhand)
- Coach: Martin Rondina
- Prize money: US $214,842

Singles
- Career record: 0–0 (at ATP Tour level, Grand Slam level, and in Davis Cup)
- Career titles: 1 Challenger, 4 ITF
- Highest ranking: No. 182 (26 October 2026)
- Current ranking: No. 182 (26 October 2026)

Grand Slam singles results
- US Open: Q1 (2026)

Doubles
- Career record: 0–0 (at ATP Tour level, Grand Slam level, and in Davis Cup)
- Career titles: 2 ITF
- Highest ranking: No. 329 (23 February 2026)
- Current ranking: No. 513 (26 October 2026)
- Last updated on: 26 October 2026.

Guido Iván Justo (born 17 December 1997) is an Argentine tennis player. Justo has a career-high ATP singles ranking of No. 182 achieved on 26 October 2026 and a career-high ATP doubles ranking of No. 329 achieved on 23 February 2026.

Justo has won one ATP Challenger singles title at the 2026 Challenger de Tigre.

== ATP Challenger and ITF Tour finals ==
=== Singles: 13 (6–7) ===
Legend (singles) ATP Challenger Tour (2–1) Futures/ITF World Tennis Tour (4–6)	Finals by surface Hard (0–0) Clay (6–7)

Result	W–L	Date	Tournament	Tier	Surface	Opponent	Score
Loss	0–1	Oct 2022	M25 Río Cuarto, Argentina	World Tennis Tour	Clay	(Argentina) Hernán Casanova	2–6, 3–6
Loss	0–2	Aug 2023	M15 Arequipa, Peru	World Tennis Tour	Clay	(Ecuador) Álvaro Guillén Meza	4–6, 3–6
Win	1–2	Oct 2023	M15 Castellón, Spain	World Tennis Tour	Clay	(Spain) Miguel Damas	6–3, 6–2
Loss	1–3	Aug 2024	M25 Arequipa, Peru	World Tennis Tour	Clay	(Chile) Matías Soto	0–6, 6–7^{(2-7)}
Win	2–3	Sep 2024	M15 Córdoba, Argentina	World Tennis Tour	Clay	(Brazil) Pedro Rodrigues	7–5, 7–5
Win	3–3	Dec 2024	M15 Santiago, Chile	World Tennis Tour	Clay	(Chile) Matías Soto	0–6, 7–6^{(7-3)}, 6–0
Loss	3–4	Jan 2025	M15 Santiago, Chile	World Tennis Tour	Clay	(Argentina) Hernán Casanova	2–6, 6–4, 4–6
Loss	3–5	Jun 2025	M15 San Salvador de Jujuy, Argentina	World Tennis Tour	Clay	(Argentina) Lorenzo Joaquín Rodríguez	1–6, 7–5, 4–6
Loss	3–6	Jun 2025	M15 Salta, Argentina	World Tennis Tour	Clay	(Argentina) Santiago de la Fuente	Walkover
Win	4–6	Jul 2025	M15 Santiago, Chile	World Tennis Tour	Clay	(Argentina) Lucio Ratti	6–0, 6–4
Win	5–6	Feb 2026	Tigre, Argentina	Challenger	Clay	(Argentina) Lautaro Midón	4–6, 6–3, 6–0
Loss	5–7	Mar 2026	Bucaramanga, Colombia	Challenger	Clay	(Chile) Matías Soto	3–6, 3–6
Win	6–7	Sep 2026	Curitiba, Brazil	Challenger	Clay	(Brazil) Gustavo Heide	6–1, 6–4
