= Facundo Díaz Acosta =

Argentine tennis player (born 2000)

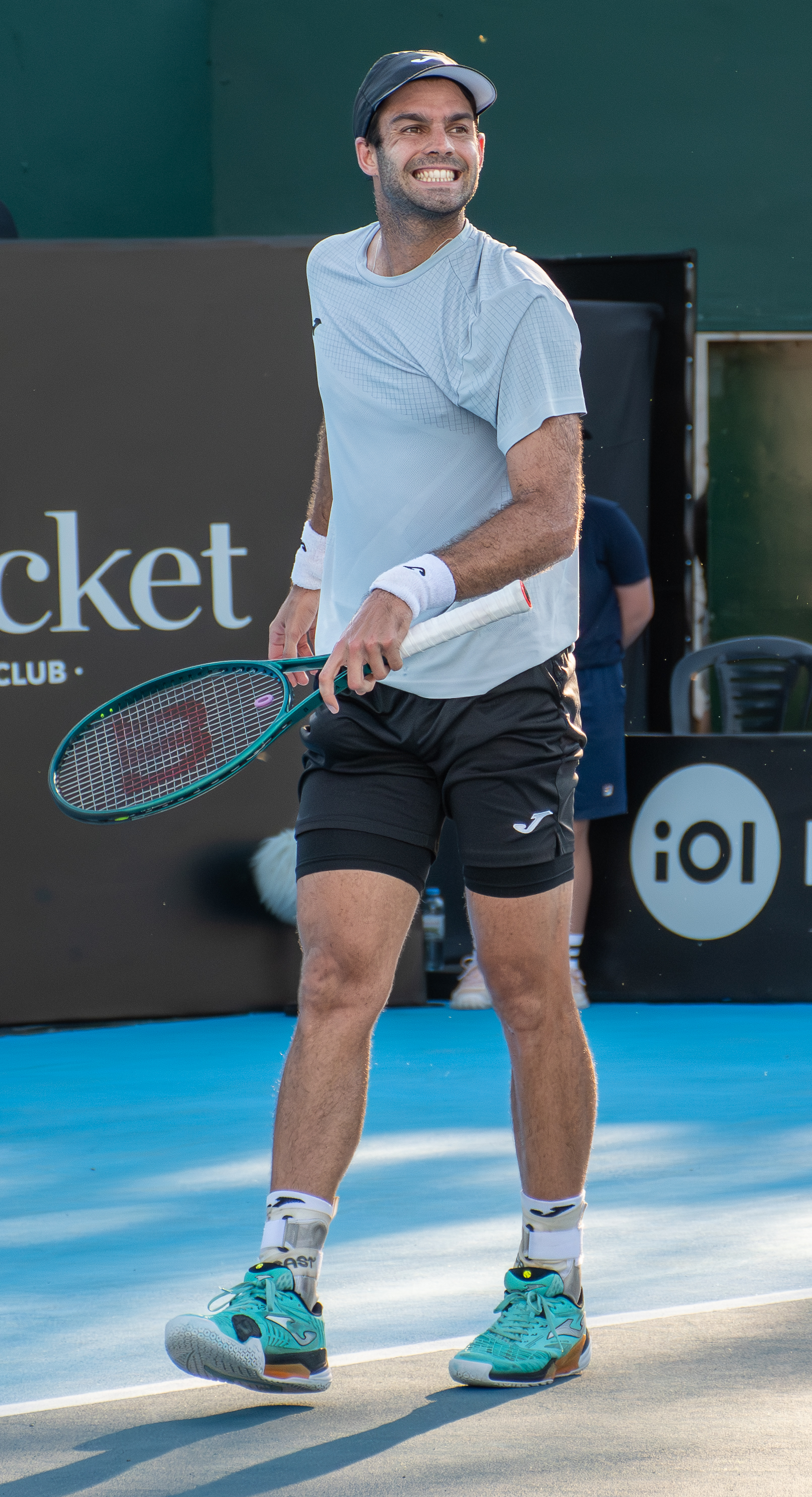
- Díaz Acosta in 2025
- Country (sports): Argentina
- Residence: Buenos Aires, Argentina
- Born: 15 December 2000 (age 25) Buenos Aires, Argentina
- Height: 1.83 m (6 ft 0 in)
- Turned pro: 2018
- Plays: Left-handed (two-handed backhand)
- Coach: Mariano Monachesi, Mariano Hood
- Prize money: US $1,716,567

Singles
- Career record: 22–30
- Career titles: 1
- Highest ranking: No. 47 (22 April 2024)
- Current ranking: No. 66 (9 November 2026)

Grand Slam singles results
- Australian Open: 2R (2025)
- French Open: 2R (2026)
- Wimbledon: 1R (2024)
- US Open: 2R (2024)

Doubles
- Career record: 0–3
- Career titles: 0
- Highest ranking: No. 173 (28 November 2022)

Grand Slam doubles results
- Wimbledon: 1R (2024)
Medal record
Men's tennis
Representing Argentina
Pan American Games
Gold medal – first place	2023 Santiago	Singles
Bronze medal – third place	2023 Santiago	Mixed doubles
South American Games
Gold medal – first place	2022 Asunción	Singles
Bronze medal – third place	2022 Asunción	Doubles
Summer Youth Olympics
Gold medal – first place	2018 Buenos Aires	Doubles
Silver medal – second place	2018 Buenos Aires	Singles
- Last updated on: 2 August 2026.

Facundo Díaz Acosta (born 15 December 2000) is an Argentine professional tennis player. He has a career-high ATP singles ranking of world No. 47 achieved on 22 April 2024 and a doubles ranking of No. 173, reached on 28 November 2022.

Díaz Acosta has won one ATP Tour title at the 2024 Argentina Open and seven ATP Challenger singles titles.

== Career ==
=== 2020–2022: ATP debut, Maiden Challenger title ===
Díaz Acosta made his ATP main draw debut at the 2020 Argentina Open after receiving a wildcard for the singles and doubles main draws.

In May 2022, Díaz Acosta won his first Challenger title at the Dove Men+Care 2022 Challenger Coquimbo in Chile on clay.

=== 2023–2025: Major and Masters debuts, First ATP title, top 50 ===
Díaz Acosta recorded his first ATP win at the 2023 Argentina Open as a wildcard against his compatriot Federico Coria and achieved his best ranking as world No. 134 on 8 May 2023, following his second ATP Challenger title at the 2023 Savannah Challenger. Díaz Acosta made his Grand Slam tournament main draw debut as a lucky loser at the 2023 French Open – Men's singles, but was defeated by Jason Kubler in the first round. He also entered the 2023 US Open losing to John Isner in the first round.

The Argentine made his Australian Open debut losing to 12th seed Taylor Fritz in five sets. Díaz Acosta reached his first ATP quarterfinal at the 2024 Córdoba Open defeating two compatriots, qualifier and ATP debutant Federico Agustín Gómez and lucky loser Thiago Agustín Tirante. The following week at the 2024 Argentina Open Díaz Acosta reached back-to-back quarterfinals defeating compatriot and fourth seed Francisco Cerúndolo in straight sets. He made his first ATP semifinal defeating Dušan Lajović setting up again a meeting with Federico Coria whom he defeated again this time to reach his first ATP final. He won his first ATP title without dropping a set the whole tournament, defeating third seed Nicolas Jarry in the final. As a result, he reached a new career-high ranking in the top 60 on 19 February 2024. In the next ATP 500 tournament in Rio he defeated Stan Wawrinka in straight sets. As a result, he moved to a new career-high in the top 55 on 26 February 2024. He lost to Sebastián Báez. The following week he played in Santiago, where he won his first round match against Pedro Cachín, before losing against Pedro Martínez.

Díaz Acosta made his ATP Masters 1000 debut at the 2024 Miami Open, losing his first round match to Alexei Popyrin in straight sets. At the next Masters in Monaco, he entered the main draw as a lucky loser, but lost to Roberto Bautista Agut in straight sets in the first round. Following his second round win at the 2024 Barcelona Open Banc Sabadell over 15th seed Borna Ćorić, he reached the top 50 in the singles rankings on 22 April 2024. Later defeating Fábián Marozsán in the third round, coming back from a set down to win the match. In the quarterfinals he lost to fifth seed Stefanos Tsitsipas.

=== 2026: Five Challenger titles, back to top 100 ===
Following winning a leading fifth Challenger title for the season at the Internazionali di Tennis San Marino Open, he returned to the top 100 for the first time since February 2025, on 3 August 2026.

== Performance timeline ==
Key
W	F	SF	QF	#R	RR	Q#	DNQ	A	NH

(W) winner; (F) finalist; (SF) semifinalist; (QF) quarterfinalist; (#R) rounds 4, 3, 2, 1; (RR) round-robin stage; (Q#) qualification round; (DNQ) did not qualify; (A) absent; (NH) not held; (SR) strike rate (events won / competed); (W–L) win–loss record.
To avoid confusion and double counting, these charts are updated at the conclusion of a tournament or when the player's participation has ended.

=== Singles ===
Current through the 2026 Shanghai Masters.

Tournament	2022	2023	2024	2025	2026	SR	W–L	Win%
Grand Slam tournaments
Australian Open	A	Q2	1R	2R	Q1	0 / 2	1–2	33%
French Open	A	1R	A	A	2R	0 / 2	1–2	33%
Wimbledon	Q1	Q1	1R	Q1	Q1	0 / 1	0–1	0%
US Open	Q1	1R	2R	A	1R	0 / 3	1–3	25%
Win–loss	0–0	0–2	1–3	1–1	1–2	0 / 8	3–8	27%
ATP Masters 1000
Indian Wells Open	A	A	A	A	A	0 / 0	0–0	–
Miami Open	A	A	1R	A	A	0 / 1	0–1	0%
Monte-Carlo Masters	A	A	1R	A	A	0 / 1	0–1	0%
Madrid Open	A	A	1R	A	A	0 / 1	0–1	0%
Italian Open	A	A	A	A	A	0 / 0	0–0	–
Canadian Open	A	A	Q1	A	A	0 / 0	0–0	–
Cincinnati Open	A	A	A	A	A	0 / 0	0–0	–
Shanghai Masters	NH	A	1R	A	1R	0 / 2	0–2	0%
Paris Masters	A	A	Q1	A		0 / 0	0–0	–
Win–loss	0–0	0–0	0–4	0–0	0–1	0 / 5	0–5	0%
Career statistics
	2022	2023	2024	2025	2026	Total		
Tournaments	0	4	18	5	6	35 (Note: 2020 ATP Tournaments: 1) (Note: 2021 ATP Tournaments: 1)		
Titles	0	0	1	0	0	1		
Finals	0	0	1	0	0	1		
Hard win–loss	0–0	1–2	1–7	3–2	0–2	0 / 13	5–13	28%
Clay win–loss	0–0	1–2	15–9	0–3	2–4	1 / 21	18–20	47%
Grass win–loss	0–0	0–0	0–1	0–0	0–0	0 / 1	0–1	0%
Overall win–loss	0–0	2–4	16–17	3–5	2–6	23–34		
Win Percentage	–	33%	48%	38%	25%	40%		
Year-end ranking	191	95	79	213		$2,018,569		

== ATP Tour finals ==
=== Singles: 1 (title) ===
Legend Grand Slam (–) ATP 1000 (–) ATP 500 (–) ATP 250 (1–0)	Finals by surface Hard (–) Clay (1–0) Grass (–)	Finals by setting Outdoor (1–0) Indoor (–)

Result	W–L	Date	Tournament	Tier	Surface	Opponent	Score
Win	1–0	Feb 2024	Argentina Open, Argentina	ATP 250	Clay	(Chile) Nicolás Jarry	6–3, 6–4

== ATP Challenger Tour finals ==
=== Singles: 16 (11 titles, 5 runner-ups) ===
Legend ATP Challenger Tour (11–5)	Finals by surface Hard (–) Clay (11–5)

Result	W–L	Date	Tournament	Tier	Surface	Opponent	Score
Loss	0–1	Jan 2022	Challenger de Tigre, Argentina	Challenger	Clay	(Argentina) Santiago Rodríguez Taverna	4–6, 2–6
Win	1–1	May 2022	Challenger de Coquimbo, Chile	Challenger	Clay	(Brazil) Pedro Boscardin Dias	7–5, 7–6^{(7–4)}
Loss	1–2	Oct 2022	Challenger de Coquimbo II, Chile	Challenger	Clay	(Argentina) Juan Manuel Cerúndolo	3–6, 6–3, 4–6
Win	2–2	Apr 2023	Savannah Challenger, US	Challenger	Clay (green)	(United States) Tristan Boyer	6–3, 6–1
Win	3–2	May 2023	Open de Oeiras II, Portugal	Challenger	Clay	(Australia) Aleksandar Vukic	6–4, 6–3
Loss	3–3	Jun 2023	Neckarcup – Heilbronn, Germany	Challenger	Clay	(Italy) Matteo Arnaldi	6–7^{(4–7)}, 1–6
Win	4–3	Jul 2023	Aspria Tennis Cup, Italy	Challenger	Clay	(Italy) Matteo Gigante	6–3, 6–3
Win	5–3	Nov 2023	Uruguay Open, Uruguay	Challenger	Clay	(Brazil) Thiago Monteiro	6–3, 4–3 ret.
Loss	5–4	Oct 2025	Antofagasta Challenger, Chile	Challenger	Clay	(Chile) Cristian Garín	6–2, 3–6, 3–6
Win	6–4	Feb 2026	Challenger de Tigre II, Argentina	Challenger	Clay	(Spain) Miguel Damas	1–6, 6–3, 6–0
Win	7–4	Mar 2026	São Léo Open, Brazil	Challenger	Clay	(Bolivia) Hugo Dellien	5–7, 6–2, 6–4
Win	8–4	May 2026	Abruzzo Open, Italy	Challenger	Clay	(Brazil) Gustavo Heide	5–7, 6–1, 6–2
Loss	8–5	Jun 2026	Poznań Open, Poland	Challenger	Clay	(Brazil) Gustavo Heide	2–6, 2–6
Win	9–5	Jul 2026	Aspria Tennis Cup, Italy (2)	Challenger	Clay	(Italy) Marco Cecchinato	6–7^{(0–7)}, 7–6^{(7–5)}, 7–6^{(7–5)}
Win	10–5	Jul 2026	San Marino Open, San Marino	Challenger	Clay	(Croatia) Mili Poljičak	6–1, 6–4
Win	11–5	Sep 2026	Copa Sevilla, Spain	Challenger	Clay	(Serbia) Dušan Lajović	6–2, 6–1

=== Doubles: 6 (1 title, 5 runner-ups) ===
Legend ATP Challenger Tour (1–5)	Finals by surface Hard (–) Clay (1–5)

Result	W–L	Date	Tournament	Tier	Surface	Partner	Opponents	Score
Loss	0–1	Jul 2021	Internazionali Città di Todi, Italy	Challenger	Clay	(Peru) Alexander Merino	(Italy) Francesco Forti (Italy) Giulio Zeppieri	3–6, 2–6
Loss	0–2	Jan 2022	Challenger de Tigre, Argentina	Challenger	Clay	(Argentina) Matías Franco Descotte	(Peru) Conner Huertas del Pino (Germany) Mats Rosenkranz	6–5 ret.
Win	1–2	Sep 2022	Copa Sevilla, Spain	Challenger	Clay	(Argentina) Román Andrés Burruchaga	(Spain) Nicolás Álvarez Varona (Spain) Alberto Barroso Campos	7–5, 6–7^{(8–10)}, [10–7]
Loss	1–3	Sep 2022	Buenos Aires Challenger, Argentina	Challenger	Clay	(Argentina) Román Andrés Burruchaga	(Argentina) Guido Andreozzi (Argentina) Guillermo Durán	0–6, 5–7
Loss	1–4	Oct 2022	Challenger de Guayaquil, Ecuador	Challenger	Clay	(Venezuela) Luis David Martínez	(Argentina) Guido Andreozzi (Argentina) Guillermo Durán	0–6, 4–6
Loss	1–5	Nov 2022	Uruguay Open, Uruguay	Challenger	Clay	(Venezuela) Luis David Martínez	(Poland) Karol Drzewiecki (Poland) Piotr Matuszewski	4–6, 4–6

== ITF World Tennis Tour finals ==
=== Singles: 6 (3 titles, 3 runner-ups) ===
Legend ITF WTT (3–3)	Finals by surface Hard (–) Clay (3–3)

Result	W–L	Date	Tournament	Tier	Surface	Opponent	Score
Loss	0–1	May 2019	M25 Vic, Spain	WTT	Clay	(Italy) Raúl Brancaccio	7–5, 5–7, 3–6
Loss	0–2	Jun 2019	M15 Majadahonda, Spain	WTT	Clay	(Spain) Pol Toledo Bagué	2–6, 6–7^{(2–7)}
Win	1–2	Aug 2019	M15 Santa Cristina val Gardena, Italy	WTT	Clay	(Brazil) Wilson Leite	6–7^{(7–9)}, 6–1, 6–2
Win	2–2	Mar 2020	M25 Hurlingham, Argentina	WTT	Clay	(Argentina) Juan Manuel Cerúndolo	6–4, 6–3
Loss	2–3	Aug 2021	M25 Prostějov, Czech Republic	WTT	Clay	(Spain) Nikolás Sánchez Izquierdo	4–6, 6–1, 6–2
Win	3–3	Sep 2021	M25 Eupen, Belgium	WTT	Clay	(Italy) Matteo Arnaldi	7–6^{(7–2)}, 6–2

=== Doubles: 3 (3 titles) ===
Legend ITF WTT (3–0)

Result	W–L	Date	Tournament	Tier	Surface	Partner	Opponents	Score
Win	1–0	Nov 2020	M15 Heraklion, Greece	WTT	Hard	(Brazil) Mateus Alves	(France) Corentin Denolly (France) Jonathan Eysseric	4–6, 6–3, [10–4]
Win	2–0	Nov 2020	M15 Madrid, Spain	WTT	Clay	(Mexico) Gerardo López Villaseñor	(Spain) Íñigo Cervantes (Spain) Oriol Roca Batalla	7–6^{(7–4)}, 2–6, [10–6]
Win	3–0	Aug 2021	M25 Dénia, Spain	WTT	Clay	(Japan) Shintaro Mochizuki	(Poland) Paweł Ciaś (Russia) Andrey Chepelev	7–5, 6–3
