= Ignacio Carou =

Argentine-born Uruguayan tennis player

- Country (sports): Uruguay (2019–current); Argentina (2015–19)
- Residence: Buenos Aires, Argentina
- Born: 12 July 1999 (age 27) Buenos Aires, Argentina
- Height: 1.81 m (5 ft 11 in)
- Plays: Right-handed (two-handed backhand)
- Prize money: $115,102

Singles
- Career record: 3–3 (at ATP Tour level, Grand Slam level, and in Davis Cup)
- Career titles: 0
- Highest ranking: No. 581 (29 August 2022)
- Current ranking: No. 1,735 (03 August 2026)

Doubles
- Career record: 0–6 (at ATP Tour level, Grand Slam level, and in Davis Cup)
- Career titles: 6 ITF
- Highest ranking: No. 167 (2 March 2026)
- Current ranking: No. 181 (03 August 2026)
- Last updated on: 04 August 2026.

Ignacio Carou (born 12 July 1999) is an Argentine-born Uruguayan tennis player. Carou has a career high ATP singles ranking of No. 581 achieved on 29 August 2022 and a career high ATP doubles ranking of No. 167 achieved on 2 March 2026.

Carou represents Uruguay at the Davis Cup.
