= Lautaro Midón =

Argentine tennis player (born 2004)

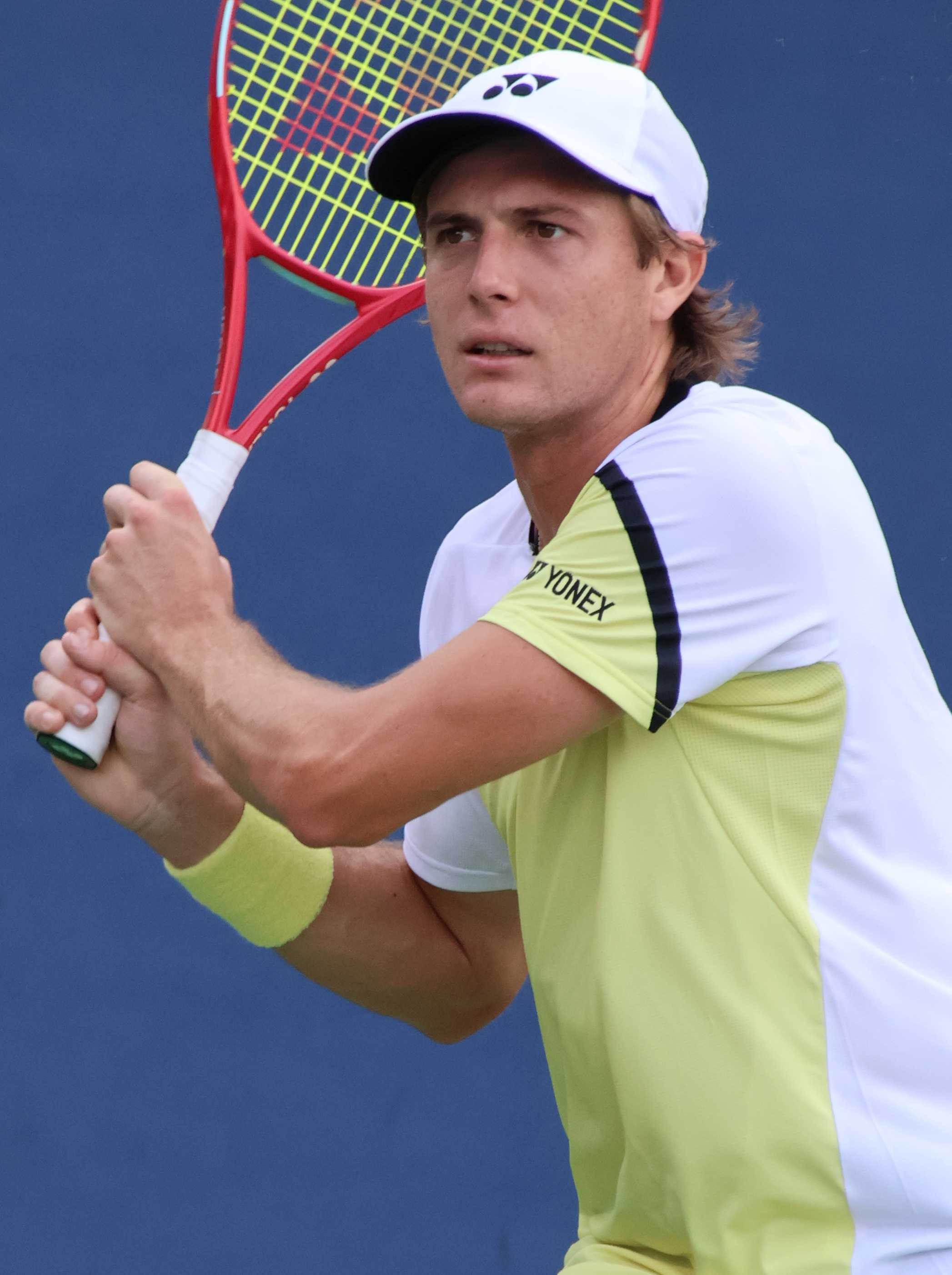
- Midón at the 2026 US Open
- Full name: Lautaro Midón Ballesteros
- Country (sports): Argentina
- Born: 29 March 2004 (age 22) Corrientes, Argentina
- Height: 1.80 m (5 ft 11 in)
- Plays: Right-handed (two-handed backhand)
- Prize money: US $326,005

Singles
- Career record: 1–2 (at ATP Tour level, Grand Slam level, and in Davis Cup)
- Career titles: 0
- Highest ranking: No. 179 (16 November 2026)
- Current ranking: No. 179 (16 November 2026)

Grand Slam singles results
- French Open: Q1 (2026)
- Wimbledon: Q1 (2026)
- US Open: Q1 (2026)

Doubles
- Career record: 0–2 (at ATP Tour level, Grand Slam level, and in Davis Cup)
- Career titles: 0
- Highest ranking: No. 427 (20 October 2025)
- Current ranking: No. 893 (16 November 2026)
Medal record
Men's tennis
Representing Argentina
South American Games
Gold medal – first place	2026 Santa Fe	Singles
Silver medal – second place	2022 Santa Fe	Doubles
- Last updated on: 16 November 2026.

Lautaro Midón (born 29 March 2004) is an Argentine professional tennis player. He has a career-high ATP singles ranking of world No. 179 achieved on 16 November 2026 and a doubles ranking of No. 427 achieved on 20 October 2025.

== Career ==
In February 2025, Midón made his ATP Tour main draw debut at his home tournament Argentina Open as an alternate into the doubles event with compatriot Gonzalo Villanueva. The local pair lost in the first round to third seeds Rafael Matos and Marcelo Melo.

In June 2025, Midón reached his first ATP Challenger final in Santa Fe, Argentina. He lost to João Lucas Reis da Silva in straight sets. Later that season, the Argentine made a second final at that level – at the Challenger de Temuco, Chile. He was defeated by compatriot Federico Gómez.

The following year, Midón entered the singles main draw at the Argentina Open as a qualifier. He lost in the first round to Pedro Martínez. Midón played again in the doubles draw with Gonzalo Villanueva, losing in straight sets to fourth seeds Marcelo Demoliner and Fernando Romboli.

In May 2026, Midón played his first Slam qualifying draw, at the French Open. He lost at his debut on the qualifying to Roberto Carballés Baena. One month later, he participated on his second major qualifying at the Wimbledon Championships, losing to Hugo Gaston.

In July 2026, Midón got his first ATP main draw victory at the Swedish Open, with a win over compatriot Facundo Díaz Acosta. He lost in the second round to third seed Alejandro Tabilo.

== Performance timeline ==
Key
W	F	SF	QF	#R	RR	Q#	DNQ	A	NH

(W) winner; (F) finalist; (SF) semifinalist; (QF) quarterfinalist; (#R) rounds 4, 3, 2, 1; (RR) round-robin stage; (Q#) qualification round; (DNQ) did not qualify; (A) absent; (NH) not held; (SR) strike rate (events won / competed); (W–L) win–loss record.

=== Singles ===
Tournament	2026	SR	W–L	Win%
Grand Slams
Australian Open	A	0 / 0	0–0	–
French Open	Q1	0 / 0	0–0	–
Wimbledon	Q1	0 / 0	0–0	–
US Open	Q1	0 / 0	0–0	–
Win–loss	0–0	0 / 0	0–0	–

== ATP Challenger Tour finals ==
=== Singles: 3 (3 runner-ups) ===
Legend ATP Challenger Tour (0–3)

Result	W–L	Date	Tournament	Tier	Surface	Opponent	Score
Loss	0–1	Jun 2025	Challenger Santa Fe, Argentina	Challenger	Clay	(Brazil) João Lucas Reis da Silva	4–6, 3–6
Loss	0–2	Nov 2025	Challenger de Temuco, Chile	Challenger	Hard	(Argentina) Federico Agustín Gómez	4–6, 1–6
Loss	0–3	Feb 2026	Challenger de Tigre, Argentina	Challenger	Clay	(Argentina) Guido Iván Justo	6–4, 3–6, 0–6

=== Doubles: 1 (runner-up) ===
Legend ATP Challenger Tour (0–1)

Result	W–L	Date	Tournament	Tier	Surface	Partner	Opponents	Score
Loss	0–1	Apr 2025	Brasil Tennis Open, Brazil	Challenger	Clay	(Argentina) Gonzalo Villanueva	(Bolivia) Juan Carlos Prado Ángelo (Bolivia) Federico Zeballos	5–7, 5–7

== ITF World Tennis Tour finals ==
=== Singles: 1 (runner-up) ===
Legend ITF WTT (0–1)

Result	W–L	Date	Tournament	Tier	Surface	Opponent	Score
Loss	0–1	Sep 2024	M15 Asunción, Paraguay	WTT	Clay	(Brazil) Pedro Boscardin Dias	2–6, 6–7^{(4–7)}
