= Challenger de Tigre =

Tennis tournament in Argentina

- 2025 Challenger de Tigre

ATP Challenger Tour
- Event name: Challenger de Tigre
- Location: Tigre, Buenos Aires Province, Argentina
- Venue: Hacoaj Nautical Club
- Category: ATP Challenger Tour
- Surface: Clay
- Draw: 32S/32Q/16D
- Prize money: $40,000 (2023), $60,000 (2025)
- Website: Website

Current champions (2025)
- Singles: (Peru) Juan Pablo Varillas
- Doubles: (Argentina) Mariano Kestelboim (Argentina) Gonzalo Villanueva

The AAT Challenger Santander edición Tigre is a professional tennis tournament played on clay courts. It is currently part of the ATP Challenger Tour. It is held annually in Tigre, Buenos Aires Province, Argentina, since 2022.

== Past finals ==
=== Singles ===
Year	Champion	Runner-up	Score
2022 (1)	(Argentina) Santiago Rodríguez Taverna	(Argentina) Facundo Díaz Acosta	6–4, 6–2
2022 (2)	(Argentina) Camilo Ugo Carabelli	(Argentina) Andrea Collarini	7–5, 6–2
2023 (1)	(Argentina) Juan Manuel Cerúndolo (1)	(Bolivia) Murkel Dellien	4–6, 6–4, 6–2
2023 (2)	(Argentina) Juan Manuel Cerúndolo (2)	(Netherlands) Jesper de Jong	6–3, 2–6, 6–2
2024	Not held		
2025	(Peru) Juan Pablo Varillas	(Paraguay) Daniel Vallejo	6–4, 6–4
2026 (1)	(Argentina) Guido Iván Justo	(Argentina) Lautaro Midón	4–6, 6–3, 6–0
2026 (2)	(Argentina) Facundo Díaz Acosta	(Spain) Miguel Damas	1–6, 6–3, 6–0

=== Doubles ===
Year	Champions	Runners-up	Score
2022 (1)	(Peru) Conner Huertas del Pino (Germany) Mats Rosenkranz	(Argentina) Matías Franco Descotte (Argentina) Facundo Díaz Acosta	5–6 retired
2022 (2)	(Argentina) Guillermo Durán (Brazil) Felipe Meligeni Alves	(Italy) Luciano Darderi (Argentina) Juan Bautista Torres	3–6, 6–4, [10–3]
2023 (1)	(Argentina) Guido Andreozzi (Uruguay) Ignacio Carou	(Argentina) Leonardo Aboian (Argentina) Ignacio Monzón	5–7, 6–4, [10–5]
2023 (2)	(Brazil) Daniel Dutra da Silva (Ukraine) Oleg Prihodko	(South Korea) Chung Yun-seong (United States) Christian Langmo	6–2, 6–2
2024	Not held		
2025	(Argentina) Mariano Kestelboim (Argentina) Gonzalo Villanueva	(Brazil) Luís Britto (Uruguay) Franco Roncadelli	6–2, 7–5
2026 (1)	(Argentina) Mariano Kestelboim (Bolivia) Juan Carlos Prado Ángelo	(Argentina) Santiago Rodríguez Taverna (Argentina) Gonzalo Villanueva	6–4, 5–7, [10–7]
2026 (2)	(Uruguay) Ignacio Carou (Argentina) Mariano Kestelboim	(Argentina) Valentín Basel (Argentina) Franco Ribero	7–6^{(7–4)}, 6–4
