= Santiago Rodríguez Taverna =

Argentine tennis player

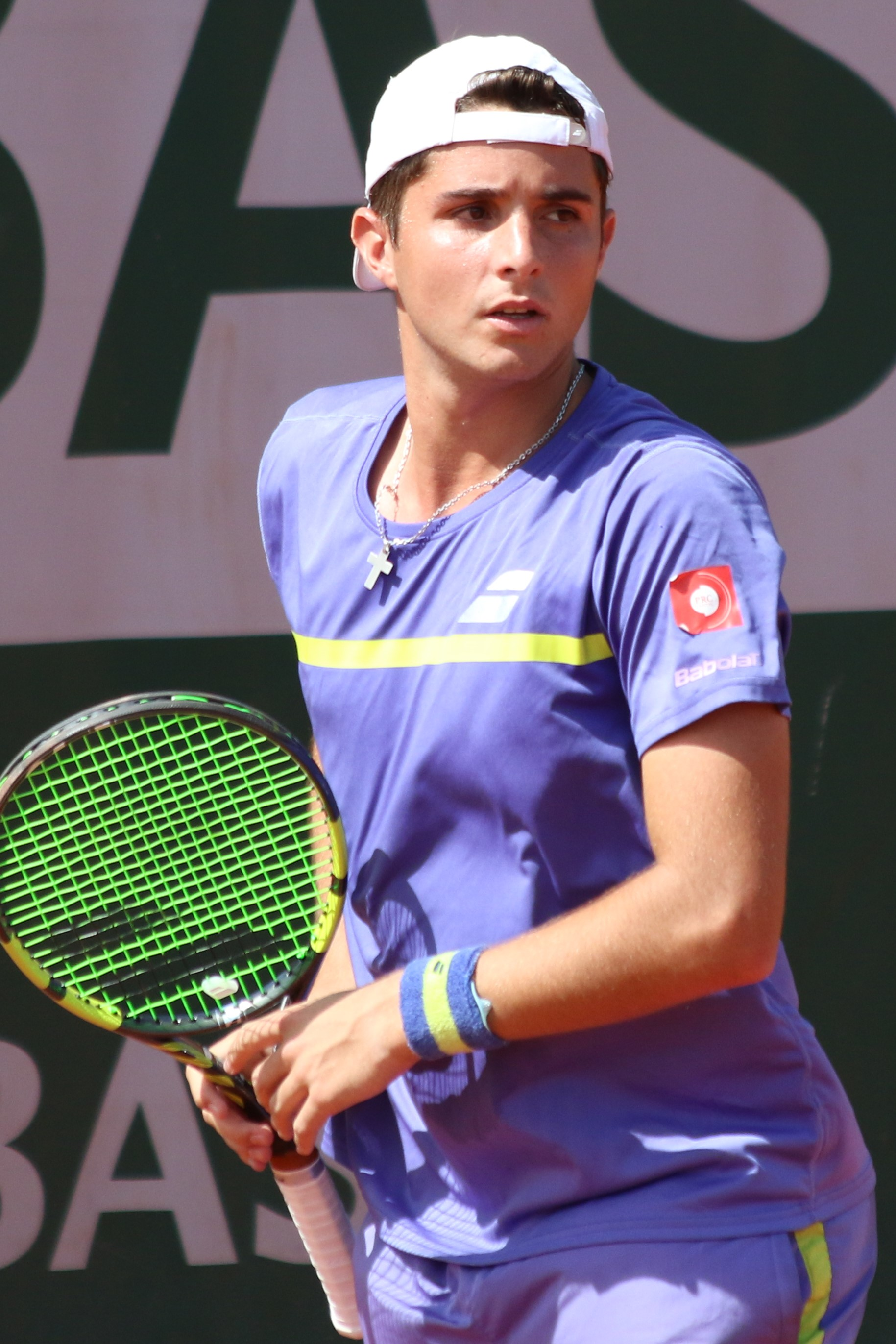
- Rodríguez Taverna at the 2022 French Open
- Country (sports): Argentina
- Born: 16 July 1999 (age 26) Buenos Aires, Argentina
- Height: 1.91 m (6 ft 3 in)
- Turned pro: 2016
- Plays: Right-handed (two-handed backhand)
- Coach: Guillermo Franco
- Prize money: US$ 533,544

Singles
- Career record: 0–1
- Career titles: 0
- Highest ranking: No. 157 (29 August 2022)
- Current ranking: No. 391 (25 May 2026)

Grand Slam singles results
- Australian Open: Q3 (2024)
- French Open: 1R (2022)
- Wimbledon: Q2 (2022)
- US Open: Q1 (2022, 2025)

Doubles
- Career record: 0–0
- Career titles: 0
- Highest ranking: No. 144 (8 April 2024)
- Current ranking: No. 164 (25 May 2026)
- Last updated on: 17:28, 9 June 2026 (UTC).

Santiago Rodríguez Taverna (born 16 July 1999) is an Argentine professional tennis player. He achieved a career-high ATP (ATP) singles ranking of world No. 157 on 29 August 2022, and a career-high doubles ranking of No. 144 on 8 April 2024.

== Career ==
Rodríguez Taverna won his first ATP Challenger singles title at the 2022 Challenger de Tigre in Buenos Aires.

Ranked No. 201 at the 2022 French Open, he qualified for his Grand Slam main draw debut, defeating Dimitar Kuzmanov. In the first round, he played a five-set match against World No. 14 Taylor Fritz that lasted over three and a half hours.

== ATP Challenger and ITF Tour finals ==
=== Singles 23 (9–14) ===
Legend (singles) ATP Challenger Tour (2–4) ITF Futures/World Tennis Tour (7–10)	Titles by surface Hard (1–7) Clay (8–7) Grass (0–0) Carpet (0–0)

Result	W–L	Date	Tournament	Tier	Surface	Opponent	Score
Loss	0–1	9 September 2018	Argentina F4, Rosario	Futures	Clay	(Argentina) Matías Zukas	6–7^{(3–7)}, 3–6
Win	1–1	11 November 2018	Argentina F8, Buenos Aires	Futures	Clay	(Argentina) Mariano Kestelboim	3–6, 6–4, 6–4
Loss	1–2	4 August 2019	M25 Decatur, USA	World Tennis Tour	Hard	(United States) Jenson Brooksby	1–6, 4–6
Win	2–2	1 December 2019	M15 Maldonado, Uruguay	World Tennis Tour	Clay	(Argentina) Mariano Kestelboim	3–6, 6–2, 6–1
Win	3–2	23 February 2020	M25 Punta del Este, Uruguay	World Tennis Tour	Clay	(Italy) Franco Agamenone	6–4, 6–3
Loss	3–3	6 June 2021	M15 Monastir, Tunisia	World Tennis Tour	Hard	(Turkey) Yanki Erel	6–4, 1–6, 2–6
Loss	3–4	13 June 2021	M15 Monastir, Tunisia	World Tennis Tour	Hard	(Burundi) Guy Orly Iradukunda	2–6, 6–4, 6–7^{(2–7)}
Loss	3–5	19 June 2021	M15 Monastir, Tunisia	World Tennis Tour	Hard	(Italy) Luciano Darderi	3–6, 5–7
Win	4–5	25 July 2021	M15 Monastir, Tunisia	World Tennis Tour	Hard	(Argentina) Matías Franco Descotte	6–4, 3–6, 7–5
Loss	4–6	15 August 2021	M15 Monastir, Tunisia	World Tennis Tour	Hard	(France) Dan Added	3–6, 4–6
Loss	4–7	12 September 2021	M25 Sintra, Portugal	World Tennis Tour	Hard	(United Kingdom) Paul Jubb	5–7, 4–6
Win	5–7	12 December 2021	M25 Río Cuarto, Argentina	World Tennis Tour	Clay	(Argentina) Juan Bautista Torres	6–2, 7–6^{(7–2)}
Win	6–7	9 January 2022	Buenos Aires, Argentina	Challenger	Clay	(Argentina) Facundo Díaz Acosta	6–4, 6–2
Loss	6–8	23 January 2022	Concepción, Chile	Challenger	Clay	(Colombia) Daniel Elahi Galán	1–6, 6–3, 3–6
Win	7–8	3 April 2022	M25 Rosario, Argentina	World Tennis Tour	Clay	(Argentina) Gonzalo Villanueva	4–6, 6–3, 6–3
Loss	7–9	6 March 2023	M25 Tucumán, Argentina	World Tennis Tour	Clay	(Argentina) Francisco Comesaña	5–7, 7–6^{(8–6)}, 3–6
Loss	7–10	Apr 2023	Barletta, Italy	Challenger	Clay	(Japan) Shintaro Mochizuki	1–6, 4–6
Loss	7–11	Aug 2024	Todi, Italy	Challenger	Clay	(Spain) Carlos Taberner	4–6, 3–6
Win	8–11	31 March 2025	M25 Chacabuco, Argentina	World Tennis Tour	Clay	(Argentina) Juan Manuel La Serna	4–6, 6–4, 6–2
Loss	8–12	Apr 2025	San Miguel de Tucumán, Argentina	Challenger	Clay	(Argentina) Alex Barrena	5–7, 2–6
Win	9–12	Apr 2025	Porto Alegre, Brazil	Challenger	Clay	(Spain) Nikolás Sánchez Izquierdo	4–6, 6–4, 7–6^{(8–6)}
Loss	9–13	12 May 2025	M25 Xalapa, Mexico	World Tennis Tour	Hard	(United States) Stefan Kozlov	7–6^{(7–4)}, 4–6, 4–6
Loss	9–14	2 November 2025	M25 Lajeado, Brazil	World Tennis Tour	Clay	(Brazil) Gustavo Heide	1–6, 4–6
