= 2025 Challenger de Villa María – Singles =

Singles
- 2025 Challenger de Villa María

Final
- Champion: (United States) Emilio Nava
- Runner-up: (Argentina) Alex Barrena
- Score: 6–3, 6–3

Events
Singles	Doubles
- Challenger de Villa María

Camilo Ugo Carabelli was the defending champion but chose not to defend his title.

Emilio Nava won the title after defeating Alex Barrena 6–3, 6–3 in the final.

== Seeds ==
1. (United States) Emilio Nava (champion)
2. (Bolivia) Hugo Dellien (first round)
3. (Italy) Francesco Maestrelli (quarterfinals)
4. (Argentina) Federico Agustín Gómez (semifinals)
5. (Argentina) Genaro Alberto Olivieri (first round)
6. (Peru) Gonzalo Bueno (first round)
7. (Argentina) Alex Barrena (final)
8. (Brazil) João Lucas Reis da Silva (first round)

== Draw ==
Key

- Q = Qualifier
- WC = Wild card
- LL = Lucky loser
- Alt = Alternate
- ITF = ITF entry
- PR = Protected ranking
- SR = Special ranking
- SE = Special exempt
- JE = Junior exempt
- JR = Junior Accelerator Programme entrant
- CO = College Accelerator Programme entrant
- NG = Next Gen Accelerator Program entrant
- w/o = Walkover
- r = Retired
- d = Defaulted

=== Finals ===
Semifinals
1	(United States) Emilio Nava	6	7^{7}
(Bolivia) Murkel Dellien	4	6^{5}
4	(Argentina) Federico Agustín Gómez	3	4
7	(Argentina) Alex Barrena	6	6

Final
1	(United States) Emilio Nava	6	6
7	(Argentina) Alex Barrena	3	3

=== Top half ===
First round
1	(United States) E Nava	4	6	6
(Brazil) D Dutra da Silva	6	4	4
(Peru) JP Varillas	7^{7}	6
Q	(Argentina) S de la Fuente	6^{5}	3
(Brazil) P Boscardin Dias	2	2
(Bolivia) JC Prado Ángelo	6	6
(Thailand) M Jones	7^{7}	6
8	(Brazil) JL Reis da Silva	6^{2}	4
3	(Italy) F Maestrelli	7^{16}	1	6
Alt	(Argentina) Lorenzo Joaquín Rodríguez	6^{14}	6	3
(Chile) M Soto	6	7
Q	(Argentina) Carlos María Zárate	4	5
(Argentina) GI Justo	6^{5}	6	6
WC	(Argentina) JB Torres	7^{7}	3	4
(Bolivia) M Dellien	3	6	6
5	(Argentina) GA Olivieri	6	1	4

Second round
1	(United States) E Nava	6	6
(Peru) JP Varillas	3	2
(Bolivia) JC Prado Ángelo	6	6
(Thailand) M Jones	4	1
3	(Italy) F Maestrelli	6	6
(Chile) M Soto	2	4
(Argentina) GI Justo	4	0
(Bolivia) M Dellien	6	6

Quarterfinals
1	(United States) E Nava	7^{11}	6
(Bolivia) JC Prado Ángelo	6^{9}	4
3	(Italy) F Maestrelli	3	6	1
(Bolivia) M Dellien	6	0	6

Semifinals
1	(United States) E Nava	6	7^{7}
(Bolivia) M Dellien	4	6^{5}

=== Bottom half ===
First round
6	(Peru) G Bueno	7^{7}	2	1
(Argentina) A Collarini	6^{4}	6	6
(Argentina) LE Ambrogi	6	2	4
Q	(Argentina) F Bagnis	2	6	6
(Argentina) N Kicker	3	2
Q	(Argentina) H Casanova	6	6
WC	(Argentina) Fernando Cavallo	2	5
4	(Argentina) FA Gómez	6	7
7	(Argentina) A Barrena	7^{7}	6
(Argentina) G Villanueva	6^{4}	1
Q	(Argentina) Lautaro Agustín Falabella	6^{2}	1
WC	(Argentina) JM La Serna	7^{7}	6
Q	(Italy) Facundo Juárez	4	3
Alt	(Argentina) M Kestelboim	6	6
(Argentina) L Midón	6	2	6
2	(Bolivia) H Dellien	0	6	3

Second round
(Argentina) A Collarini
Q	(Argentina) F Bagnis	w/o
Q	(Argentina) H Casanova	3	5
4	(Argentina) FA Gómez	6	7
7	(Argentina) A Barrena	6	7^{7}
WC	(Argentina) JM La Serna	4	6^{5}
Alt	(Argentina) M Kestelboim	2	6	6
(Argentina) L Midón	6	3	3

Quarterfinals
Q	(Argentina) F Bagnis	2	6^{2}
4	(Argentina) FA Gómez	6	7^{7}
7	(Argentina) A Barrena	6	6
Alt	(Argentina) M Kestelboim	0	1

Semifinals
4	(Argentina) FA Gómez	3	4
7	(Argentina) A Barrena	6	6
