= 2025 Challenger Tucumán – Doubles =

Doubles
- 2025 Challenger Tucumán

Final
- Champions: (Peru) Conner Huertas del Pino (Bolivia) Federico Zeballos
- Runners-up: (Argentina) Luciano Emanuel Ambrogi (Argentina) Máximo Zeitune
- Score: 1–6, 6–2, [10–8]

Events
Singles	Doubles
- Challenger Tucumán

Luís Britto and Gonzalo Villanueva were the defending champions but chose to defend their title with different partners. Britto partnered João Eduardo Schiessl but lost in the quarterfinals to Ignacio Carou and Murkel Dellien. Villanueva partnered Mariano Kestelboim, but they withdrew before their first round match.

Conner Huertas del Pino and Federico Zeballos won the title after defeating Luciano Emanuel Ambrogi and Máximo Zeitune 1–6, 6–2, [10–8] in the final.

== Seeds ==
1. (Argentina) Mariano Kestelboim / (Argentina) Gonzalo Villanueva (first round, withdrew)
2. (Peru) Conner Huertas del Pino / (Bolivia) Federico Zeballos (champions)
3. (Argentina) Leonardo Aboian / (Argentina) Valerio Aboian (quarterfinals)
4. (United States) Pranav Kumar / (United States) Noah Schachter (withdrew)

== Draw ==
Key

- Q = Qualifier
- WC = Wild card
- LL = Lucky loser
- Alt = Alternate
- ITF = ITF entry
- PR = Protected ranking
- SR = Special ranking
- SE = Special exempt
- JE = Junior exempt
- JR = Junior Accelerator Programme entrant
- CO = College Accelerator Programme entrant
- NG = Next Gen Accelerator Program entrant
- w/o = Walkover
- r = Retired
- d = Defaulted

=== Draw ===
First round
1	(Argentina) M Kestelboim (Argentina) G Villanueva
(Uruguay) I Carou (Bolivia) M Dellien	w/o
(Argentina) GI Justo (Argentina) R Olivo	4	4
(Brazil) L Britto (Brazil) João Eduardo Schiessl	6	6
3	(Argentina) Leonardo Aboian (Argentina) V Aboian	7^{7}	6
(Ukraine) V Orlov (Brazil) Gabriel Roveri Sidney	6^{3}	2
WC	(Argentina) LE Ambrogi (Argentina) Máximo Zeitune	6	6^{5}	[10]
(Ecuador) Á Guillén Meza (Argentina) Ignacio Monzón	2	7^{7}	[7]
(Uruguay) F Roncadelli (Brazil) PA Saraiva dos Santos	6	6
WC	(Argentina) Juan Estévez (Argentina) Gonzalo Zeitune	3	1
(Argentina) JM La Serna (Argentina) L Midón
Alt	(Argentina) Thiago Cigarrán (Argentina) AL Lingua Lavallén	w/o
(Argentina) Valentín Basel (Argentina) F Ribero	4	6^{4}
(Argentina) H Casanova (Argentina) S Rodríguez Taverna	6	7^{7}
(Brazil) M Barreiros Reyes (Brazil) P Boscardin Dias
2	(Peru) C Huertas del Pino (Bolivia) F Zeballos	w/o

Quarterfinals
(Uruguay) I Carou (Bolivia) M Dellien	6	6
(Brazil) L Britto (Brazil) JE Schiessl	3	4
3	(Argentina) L Aboian (Argentina) V Aboian	6^{4}	6^{3}
WC	(Argentina) LE Ambrogi (Argentina) M Zeitune	7^{7}	7^{7}
(Uruguay) F Roncadelli (Brazil) PA Saraiva dos Santos	6	6
Alt	(Argentina) T Cigarrán (Argentina) AL Lingua Lavallén	3	1
(Argentina) H Casanova (Argentina) S Rodríguez Taverna	5	2
2	(Peru) C Huertas del Pino (Bolivia) F Zeballos	7	6

Semifinals
(Uruguay) I Carou (Bolivia) M Dellien	6^{5}	3
WC	(Argentina) LE Ambrogi (Argentina) M Zeitune	7^{7}	6
(Uruguay) F Roncadelli (Brazil) PA Saraiva dos Santos	6^{0}	1
2	(Peru) C Huertas del Pino (Bolivia) F Zeballos	7^{7}	6

Final
WC	(Argentina) LE Ambrogi (Argentina) M Zeitune	6	2	[8]
2	(Peru) C Huertas del Pino (Bolivia) F Zeballos	1	6	[10]
