= 2025 Challenger Tucumán – Singles =

Singles
- 2025 Challenger Tucumán

Final
- Champion: (Argentina) Alex Barrena
- Runner-up: (Argentina) Santiago Rodríguez Taverna
- Score: 7–5, 6–2

Events
Singles	Doubles
- Challenger Tucumán

Andrea Collarini was the defending champion but lost in the semifinals to Santiago Rodríguez Taverna.

Alex Barrena won the title after defeating Rodríguez Taverna 7–5, 6–2 in the final.

== Seeds ==
1. (Argentina) Andrea Collarini (semifinals)
2. (Ecuador) Álvaro Guillén Meza (first round)
3. (Bolivia) Murkel Dellien (semifinals)
4. (Argentina) Santiago Rodríguez Taverna (final)
5. (Argentina) Juan Bautista Torres (quarterfinals)
6. (Argentina) Lautaro Midón (second round)
7. (Uruguay) Franco Roncadelli (second round)
8. (Argentina) Renzo Olivo (second round)

== Draw ==
Key

- Q = Qualifier
- WC = Wild card
- LL = Lucky loser
- Alt = Alternate
- ITF = ITF entry
- PR = Protected ranking
- SR = Special ranking
- SE = Special exempt
- JE = Junior exempt
- JR = Junior Accelerator Programme entrant
- CO = College Accelerator Programme entrant
- NG = Next Gen Accelerator Program entrant
- w/o = Walkover
- r = Retired
- d = Defaulted

=== Finals ===
Semifinals
1	(Argentina) Andrea Collarini	6^{7}	3
4	(Argentina) Santiago Rodríguez Taverna	7^{9}	6
3	(Bolivia) Murkel Dellien	7^{7}	6^{3}	2
(Argentina) Alex Barrena	6^{4}	7^{7}	6

Final
4	(Argentina) Santiago Rodríguez Taverna	5	2
(Argentina) Alex Barrena	7	6

=== Top half ===
First round
1	(Argentina) A Collarini	6	6
WC	(Argentina) JM La Serna	4	2
(Brazil) J Pereira	7^{7}	3	3
(Argentina) LE Ambrogi	6^{5}	6	6
WC	(Argentina) F Bagnis	6	6
(Argentina) G Villanueva	4	1
(Argentina) H Casanova	4	6	5
8	(Argentina) R Olivo	6	1	7
4	(Argentina) S Rodríguez Taverna	6	6
(Argentina) Juan Estévez	1	1
Q	(Brazil) M Barreiros Reyes	6^{7}	3
(Argentina) GI Justo	7^{9}	6
(Ukraine) V Orlov	4	4
(Argentina) V Aboian	6	6
Q	(Argentina) Ignacio Monzón	2	4
5	(Argentina) JB Torres	6	6

Second round
1	(Argentina) A Collarini	6	7^{8}
(Argentina) LE Ambrogi	2	6^{6}
WC	(Argentina) F Bagnis	7	5	6
8	(Argentina) R Olivo	5	7	3
4	(Argentina) S Rodríguez Taverna	6	6
(Argentina) GI Justo	4	3
(Argentina) V Aboian	2	2
5	(Argentina) JB Torres	6	6

Quarterfinals
1	(Argentina) A Collarini	3	7^{7}	4
WC	(Argentina) F Bagnis	6	6^{3}	5^{r}
4	(Argentina) S Rodríguez Taverna	6	7^{7}
5	(Argentina) JB Torres	3	6^{4}

Semifinals
1	(Argentina) A Collarini	6^{7}	3
4	(Argentina) S Rodríguez Taverna	7^{9}	6

=== Bottom half ===
First round
6	(Argentina) L Midón	6	6
(Brazil) João Eduardo Schiessl	3	4
Q	(Brazil) Igor Gimenez	3	3
(Brazil) P Boscardin Dias	6	6
(Argentina) Lorenzo Joaquín Rodríguez	4	6	6^{6}
Q	(Peru) C Huertas del Pino	6	3	7^{8}
WC	(Argentina) Máximo Zeitune	3	2
3	(Bolivia) M Dellien	6	6
7	(Uruguay) F Roncadelli	6	7
Q	(Brazil) Nicolas Zanellato	1	5
(Argentina) A Barrena	6	6
(Argentina) N Kicker	4	2
Q	(Argentina) Fermín Tenti	3	6	6
(Argentina) AL Lingua Lavallén	6	1	3
(Argentina) M Kestelboim	6	3	6
2	(Ecuador) Á Guillén Meza	1	6	2

Second round
6	(Argentina) L Midón	6	3	4
(Brazil) P Boscardin Dias	4	6	6
Q	(Peru) C Huertas del Pino	4	2
3	(Bolivia) M Dellien	6	6
7	(Uruguay) F Roncadelli	4	3
(Argentina) A Barrena	6	6
Q	(Argentina) F Tenti	5	3
(Argentina) M Kestelboim	7	6

Quarterfinals
(Brazil) P Boscardin Dias	6	3	1
3	(Bolivia) M Dellien	1	6	6
(Argentina) A Barrena	6	6
(Argentina) M Kestelboim	0	2

Semifinals
3	(Bolivia) M Dellien	7^{7}	6^{3}	2
(Argentina) A Barrena	6^{4}	7^{7}	6
