= 2025 Challenger de Villa María – Doubles =

Doubles
- 2025 Challenger de Villa María

Final
- Champions: (Argentina) Guillermo Durán (Argentina) Mariano Kestelboim
- Runners-up: (Brazil) Daniel Dutra da Silva (Argentina) Gonzalo Villanueva
- Score: 6–4, 6–2

Events
Singles	Doubles
- Challenger de Villa María

Orlando Luz and Marcelo Zormann were the defending champions but only Zormann chose to defend his title, partnering Luís Britto. They lost in the first round to Daniel Dutra da Silva and Gonzalo Villanueva.

Guillermo Durán and Mariano Kestelboim won the title after defeating Dutra da Silva and Villanueva 6–4, 6–2 in the final.

== Seeds ==
1. (Ecuador) Gonzalo Escobar / (Mexico) Miguel Ángel Reyes-Varela (semifinals)
2. (Brazil) Luís Britto / (Brazil) Marcelo Zormann (first round)
3. (Colombia) Cristian Rodríguez / (Bolivia) Federico Zeballos (first round)
4. (Uruguay) Ignacio Carou / (Chile) Matías Soto (quarterfinals)

== Draw ==
Key

- Q = Qualifier
- WC = Wild card
- LL = Lucky loser
- Alt = Alternate
- ITF = ITF entry
- PR = Protected ranking
- SR = Special ranking
- SE = Special exempt
- JE = Junior exempt
- JR = Junior Accelerator Programme entrant
- CO = College Accelerator Programme entrant
- NG = Next Gen Accelerator Program entrant
- w/o = Walkover
- r = Retired
- d = Defaulted

=== Draw ===
First round
1	(Ecuador) G Escobar (Mexico) M Reyes-Varela	6	6
(Argentina) LE Ambrogi (Argentina) L Midón	3	2
WC	(Argentina) Valentín Basel (Argentina) F Ribero	6	3	[10]
(Argentina) Leonardo Aboian (Argentina) V Aboian	4	6	[4]
4	(Uruguay) I Carou (Chile) M Soto	6	7
(Argentina) S de la Fuente (Argentina) GA Olivieri	3	5
Alt	(Argentina) Lautaro Agustín Falabella (Argentina) GI Justo	6^{4}	5
(Argentina) G Durán (Argentina) M Kestelboim	7^{7}	7
(Brazil) P Boscardin Dias (Brazil) JL Reis da Silva	6	6
WC	(Argentina) Lucio Ratti (Argentina) Carlos María Zárate	2	4
(Bolivia) M Dellien (Peru) A Huertas del Pino	6	3	[10]
3	(Colombia) C Rodríguez (Bolivia) F Zeballos	3	6	[3]
(Italy) F Maestrelli (Brazil) Bruno Oliveira	0	6	[10]
(Argentina) H Casanova (Argentina) A Collarini	6	1	[2]
(Brazil) D Dutra da Silva (Argentina) G Villanueva	4	6	[10]
2	(Brazil) L Britto (Brazil) M Zormann	6	3	[5]

Quarterfinals
1	(Ecuador) G Escobar (Mexico) M Reyes-Varela	6	6
WC	(Argentina) V Basel (Argentina) F Ribero	3	4
4	(Uruguay) I Carou (Chile) M Soto	4	6	[9]
(Argentina) G Durán (Argentina) M Kestelboim	6	4	[11]
(Brazil) P Boscardin Dias (Brazil) JL Reis da Silva	7^{7}	3	[5]
(Bolivia) M Dellien (Peru) A Huertas del Pino	6^{3}	6	[10]
(Italy) F Maestrelli (Brazil) B Oliveira	3	2
(Brazil) D Dutra da Silva (Argentina) G Villanueva	6	6

Semifinals
1	(Ecuador) G Escobar (Mexico) M Reyes-Varela	4	6	[4]
(Argentina) G Durán (Argentina) M Kestelboim	6	2	[10]
(Bolivia) M Dellien (Peru) A Huertas del Pino	3	3
(Brazil) D Dutra da Silva (Argentina) G Villanueva	6	6

Final
(Argentina) G Durán (Argentina) M Kestelboim	6	6
(Brazil) D Dutra da Silva (Argentina) G Villanueva	4	2
