= 2024 Challenger de Villa María – Doubles =

Doubles
- 2024 Challenger de Villa María

Final
- Champions: (Brazil) Orlando Luz (Brazil) Marcelo Zormann
- Runners-up: (Bolivia) Boris Arias (Bolivia) Federico Zeballos
- Score: 0–6, 6–3, [10–4]

Events
Singles	Doubles
- Challenger de Villa María

Hernán Casanova and Santiago Rodríguez Taverna were the defending champions but lost in the semifinals to Orlando Luz and Marcelo Zormann.

Luz and Zormann won the title after defeating Boris Arias and Federico Zeballos 0–6, 6–3, [10–4] in the final.

== Seeds ==
1. (Brazil) Orlando Luz / (Brazil) Marcelo Zormann (champions)
2. (Bolivia) Boris Arias / (Bolivia) Federico Zeballos (final)
3. (Argentina) Federico Agustín Gómez / (Venezuela) Luis David Martínez (first round)
4. (United Kingdom) Scott Duncan / (United States) Hunter Reese (quarterfinals)

== Draw ==
Key

- Q = Qualifier
- WC = Wild card
- LL = Lucky loser
- Alt = Alternate
- ITF = ITF entry
- PR = Protected ranking
- SR = Special ranking
- SE = Special exempt
- JE = Junior exempt
- JR = Junior Accelerator Programme entrant
- CO = College Accelerator Programme entrant
- NG = Next Gen Accelerator Program entrant
- w/o = Walkover
- r = Retired
- d = Defaulted

=== Draw ===
First round
1	(Brazil) O Luz (Brazil) M Zormann	2	6	[12]
(Argentina) Leonardo Aboian (Argentina) V Aboian	6	3	[10]
Alt	(Argentina) Valentín Basel (Argentina) F Ribero	7^{7}	2	[5]
(Brazil) M Alves (Argentina) M Kestelboim	6^{5}	6	[10]
3	(Argentina) FA Gómez (Venezuela) LD Martínez	2	6	[5]
Alt	(Argentina) H Casanova (Argentina) S Rodríguez Taverna	6	3	[10]
(Bolivia) M Dellien (Argentina) F Mena	6	6
(Uruguay) I Carou (Argentina) C Ugo Carabelli	4	4
(Brazil) P Sakamoto (Argentina) G Villanueva	w/o
(Argentina) RA Burruchaga (Argentina) A Collarini
WC	(Argentina) Mateo del Pino (Argentina) JM La Serna	3	5
4	(United Kingdom) S Duncan (United States) H Reese	6	7
(Brazil) L Britto (Brazil) PA Saraiva dos Santos	4	7^{7}	[10]
WC	(Argentina) Tomás Farjat (Argentina) AL Lingua Lavallén	6	6^{5}	[8]
(United States) T Boyer (Argentina) JP Ficovich	4	2
2	(Bolivia) B Arias (Bolivia) F Zeballos	6	6

Quarterfinals
1	(Brazil) O Luz (Brazil) M Zormann	7^{7}	6
(Brazil) M Alves (Argentina) M Kestelboim	6^{4}	3
Alt	(Argentina) H Casanova (Argentina) S Rodríguez Taverna	7^{7}	2	[11]
(Bolivia) M Dellien (Argentina) F Mena	6^{5}	6	[9]
(Brazil) P Sakamoto (Argentina) G Villanueva	3	6	[10]
4	(United Kingdom) S Duncan (United States) H Reese	6	1	[8]
(Brazil) L Britto (Brazil) PA Saraiva dos Santos	6^{9}	2
2	(Bolivia) B Arias (Bolivia) F Zeballos	7^{11}	6

Semifinals
1	(Brazil) O Luz (Brazil) M Zormann	4	7^{7}	[10]
Alt	(Argentina) H Casanova (Argentina) S Rodríguez Taverna	6	6^{1}	[5]
(Brazil) P Sakamoto (Argentina) G Villanueva	1	0
2	(Bolivia) B Arias (Bolivia) F Zeballos	6	6

Final
1	(Brazil) O Luz (Brazil) M Zormann	0	6	[10]
2	(Bolivia) B Arias (Bolivia) F Zeballos	6	3	[4]
