= 2024 Challenger Tucumán – Singles =

Singles
- 2024 Challenger Tucumán

Final
- Champion: (Argentina) Andrea Collarini
- Runner-up: (Argentina) Hernán Casanova
- Score: 6–4, 7–6^{(7–3)}

Events
Singles	Doubles
- Challenger Tucumán

This was the first edition of the tournament.

Andrea Collarini won the title after defeating Hernán Casanova 6–4, 7–6^{(7–3)} in the final.

== Seeds ==
1. (Argentina) Genaro Alberto Olivieri (second round)
2. (Argentina) Renzo Olivo (quarterfinals)
3. (Argentina) Andrea Collarini (champion)
4. (Turkey) Ergi Kırkın (quarterfinals)
5. (Argentina) Hernán Casanova (final)
6. (Argentina) Gonzalo Villanueva (quarterfinals)
7. (Argentina) Valerio Aboian (semifinals)
8. (Argentina) Luciano Emanuel Ambrogi (first round)

== Draw ==
Key

- Q = Qualifier
- WC = Wild card
- LL = Lucky loser
- Alt = Alternate
- ITF = ITF entry
- PR = Protected ranking
- SR = Special ranking
- SE = Special exempt
- JE = Junior exempt
- JR = Junior Accelerator Programme entrant
- CO = College Accelerator Programme entrant
- NG = Next Gen Accelerator Program entrant
- w/o = Walkover
- r = Retired
- d = Defaulted

=== Finals ===
Semifinals
WC	(Argentina) Lautaro Midón	1	6^{5}
3	(Argentina) Andrea Collarini	6	7^{7}
5	(Argentina) Hernán Casanova	2	6	7
7	(Argentina) Valerio Aboian	6	2	5

Final
3	(Argentina) Andrea Collarini	6	7^{7}
5	(Argentina) Hernán Casanova	4	6^{3}

=== Top half ===
First round
1	(Argentina) GA Olivieri	6	3	6
(Brazil) J Pereira	3	6	3
(Argentina) Ignacio Monzón	2	3
(Uruguay) F Roncadelli	6	6
WC	(Argentina) Bautista Vilicich	3	6	6
Q	(Brazil) Bruno Fernandez	6	2	3
WC	(Argentina) L Midón	6	6
8	(Argentina) LE Ambrogi	2	4
3	(Argentina) A Collarini	6	6
(Argentina) Tomás Farjat	3	3
Q	(Argentina) Nikos Lehmann	2	2
(Argentina) Lorenzo Joaquín Rodríguez	6	6
(Argentina) M Kestelboim	6	6
Q	(Uruguay) I Carou	3	1
Q	(Argentina) AL Lingua Lavallén	6^{1}	3
6	(Argentina) G Villanueva	7^{7}	6

Second round
1	(Argentina) GA Olivieri	2	6	5
(Uruguay) F Roncadelli	6	4	7
WC	(Argentina) B Vilicich	2	3
WC	(Argentina) L Midón	6	6
3	(Argentina) A Collarini	6	4	6
(Argentina) LJ Rodríguez	4	6	4
(Argentina) M Kestelboim	0	2^{r}
6	(Argentina) G Villanueva	6	5

Quarterfinals
(Uruguay) F Roncadelli	3	3
WC	(Argentina) L Midón	6	6
3	(Argentina) A Collarini	6	6
6	(Argentina) G Villanueva	3	2

Semifinals
WC	(Argentina) L Midón	1	6^{5}
3	(Argentina) A Collarini	6	7^{7}

=== Bottom half ===
First round
5	(Argentina) H Casanova	3	6	6
Alt	(Brazil) Igor Gimenez	6	4	2
Alt	(United States) Jacob Brumm	1	3
Q	(United States) Felix Corwin	6	6
(Brazil) D Dutra da Silva	6	6
(Bolivia) JC Prado Ángelo	3	4
(Argentina) Leonardo Aboian	3	1
4	(Turkey) E Kırkın	6	6
7	(Argentina) V Aboian	6	6
(Brazil) P Boscardin Dias	3	3
WC	(Argentina) Máximo Zeitune	6	3	0
(Argentina) GI Justo	4	6	6
Q	(Bulgaria) Leonid Sheyngezikht	2	5
Alt	(Argentina) Juan Bautista Otegui	6	7
(Japan) K Uchida	5	2
2	(Argentina) R Olivo	7	6

Second round
5	(Argentina) H Casanova	6	6^{8}	6
Q	(United States) F Corwin	3	7^{10}	1
(Brazil) D Dutra da Silva	2	6	6^{3}
4	(Turkey) E Kırkın	6	1	7^{7}
7	(Argentina) V Aboian	6	7
(Argentina) GI Justo	4	5
Alt	(Argentina) JB Otegui	1	3
2	(Argentina) R Olivo	6	6

Quarterfinals
5	(Argentina) H Casanova	6	6
4	(Turkey) E Kırkın	2	2
7	(Argentina) V Aboian	5	6	6
2	(Argentina) R Olivo	7	3	4

Semifinals
5	(Argentina) H Casanova	2	6	7
7	(Argentina) V Aboian	6	2	5
