= 2024 Challenger de Villa María – Singles =

Singles
- 2024 Challenger de Villa María

Final
- Champion: (Argentina) Camilo Ugo Carabelli
- Runner-up: (Netherlands) Jesper de Jong
- Score: 7–6^{(7–3)}, 3–6, 6–4

Events
| Singles | Doubles |
- Challenger de Villa María

Nicolás Kicker was the defending champion but lost in the first round to Gustavo Heide.

Camilo Ugo Carabelli won the title after defeating Jesper de Jong 7–6^{(7–3)}, 3–6, 6–4 in the final.

== Seeds ==
1. (Argentina) Federico Coria (quarterfinals)
2. (Argentina) Francisco Comesaña (first round)
3. (Bolivia) Hugo Dellien (quarterfinals)
4. (Argentina) Camilo Ugo Carabelli (champion)
5. (Netherlands) Jesper de Jong (final)
6. (Argentina) Román Andrés Burruchaga (semifinals)
7. (Argentina) Juan Manuel Cerúndolo (semifinals)
8. (Argentina) Federico Agustín Gómez (second round)

== Draw ==
Key

- Q = Qualifier
- WC = Wild card
- LL = Lucky loser
- Alt = Alternate
- ITF = ITF entry
- PR = Protected ranking
- SR = Special ranking
- SE = Special exempt
- JE = Junior exempt
- JR = Junior Accelerator Programme entrant
- CO = College Accelerator Programme entrant
- NG = Next Gen Accelerator Program entrant
- w/o = Walkover
- r = Retired
- d = Defaulted

=== Finals ===
Semifinals
6 | (Argentina) Román Andrés Burruchaga | 2 | 3
5 | (Netherlands) Jesper de Jong | 6 | 6
4 | (Argentina) Camilo Ugo Carabelli | 6 | 6
7 | (Argentina) Juan Manuel Cerúndolo | 4 | 2

Final
5 | (Netherlands) Jesper de Jong | 6^{3} | 6 | 4
4 | (Argentina) Camilo Ugo Carabelli | 7^{7} | 3 | 6

=== Top half ===
First round
1 | (Argentina) F Coria | 6 | 7^{9}
Q | (Argentina) G Villanueva | 4 | 6^{7}
Q | (Argentina) L Midón | 1 | 3
(Argentina) F Mena | 6 | 6
(Peru) JP Varillas | 6 | 5 | 3
(Argentina) A Collarini | 2 | 7 | 6
Q | (Argentina) GA Olivieri | 1 | 4
6 | (Argentina) RA Burruchaga | 6 | 6
3 | (Bolivia) H Dellien | 7 | 6
(Argentina) S Rodríguez Taverna | 5 | 2
Q | (Argentina) N Kicker | 1 | 1
(Brazil) G Heide | 6 | 6
(Bolivia) M Dellien | 4 | 4
(United States) T Boyer | 6 | 6
WC | (Argentina) JB Torres | 3 | 4
5 | (Netherlands) J de Jong | 6 | 6

Second round
1 | (Argentina) F Coria | 4 | 6 | 6
(Argentina) F Mena | 6 | 3 | 4
(Argentina) A Collarini | 3 | 1^{r}
6 | (Argentina) RA Burruchaga | 6 | 4
3 | (Bolivia) H Dellien | 6 | 6
(Brazil) G Heide | 3 | 1
(United States) T Boyer | 6^{4} | 5
5 | (Netherlands) J de Jong | 7^{7} | 7

Quarterfinals
1 | (Argentina) F Coria | 6 | 3 | 1
6 | (Argentina) RA Burruchaga | 3 | 6 | 6
3 | (Bolivia) H Dellien | 7 | 3 | 4
5 | (Netherlands) J de Jong | 5 | 6 | 6

Semifinals
6 | (Argentina) RA Burruchaga | 2 | 3
5 | (Netherlands) J de Jong | 6 | 6

=== Bottom half ===
First round
8 | (Argentina) FA Gómez | 3 | 7 | 7^{7}
(Ecuador) Á Guillén Meza | 6 | 5 | 6^{0}
Alt | (Brazil) P Sakamoto | 7 | 6^{3} | 6
WC | (Argentina) JI Londero | 5 | 7^{7} | 0
(Paraguay) AD Vallejo | 5 | 6 | 6
(Peru) G Bueno | 7 | 3 | 4
Alt | (Argentina) R Olivo | 4 | 0
4 | (Argentina) C Ugo Carabelli | 6 | 6
7 | (Argentina) JM Cerúndolo | 6 | 6
(Argentina) JP Ficovich | 2 | 1
(Lebanon) H Habib | 4 | 6^{3}
(Brazil) F Meligeni Alves | 6 | 7^{7}
WC | (Argentina) LE Ambrogi | 6 | 6
Q | (Brazil) M Alves | 4 | 4
Q | (Brazil) M Pucinelli de Almeida | 7^{7} | 6
2 | (Argentina) F Comesaña | 6^{4} | 4

Second round
8 | (Argentina) FA Gómez | 6 | 6^{6} | 4
Alt | (Brazil) P Sakamoto | 4 | 7^{8} | 6
(Paraguay) AD Vallejo | 6 | 2 | 3
4 | (Argentina) C Ugo Carabelli | 4 | 6 | 6
7 | (Argentina) JM Cerúndolo | 6 | 7^{7}
(Brazil) F Meligeni Alves | 3 | 6^{4}
WC | (Argentina) LE Ambrogi | 1 | 4
Q | (Brazil) M Pucinelli de Almeida | 6 | 6

Quarterfinals
Alt | (Brazil) P Sakamoto | 5 | 1
4 | (Argentina) C Ugo Carabelli | 7 | 6
7 | (Argentina) JM Cerúndolo | 7^{9} | 6
Q | (Brazil) M Pucinelli de Almeida | 6^{7} | 2

Semifinals
4 | (Argentina) C Ugo Carabelli | 6 | 6
7 | (Argentina) JM Cerúndolo | 4 | 2
