= 2025 Challenger de Villa María =

- Date: 15 – 21 September
- Edition: 3rd
- Location: Villa María, Argentina

Champions

Singles
- (United States) Emilio Nava

Doubles
- (Argentina) Guillermo Durán / (Argentina) Mariano Kestelboim
- Challenger de Villa María

The 2025 AAT Challenger Santander edición Villa María was a professional tennis tournament played on clay courts. It was the tournament's third edition and part of the 2025 ATP Challenger Tour. It took place in Villa María, Argentina, between 15 and 21 September 2025.

== Singles main-draw entrants ==
=== Seeds ===
Country	Player	Rank^{1}	Seed
USA	Emilio Nava	101	1
BOL	Hugo Dellien	122	2
ITA	Francesco Maestrelli	160	3
ARG	Federico Agustín Gómez	185	4
ARG	Genaro Alberto Olivieri	206	5
PER	Gonzalo Bueno	209	6
ARG	Alex Barrena	225	7
BRA	João Lucas Reis da Silva	232	8

- ^{1} Rankings are as of 8 September 2025.

=== Other entrants ===
The following players received wildcards into the singles main draw:

- (Argentina) Fernando Cavallo
- (Argentina) Juan Manuel La Serna
- (Argentina) Juan Bautista Torres

The following players received entry into the singles main draw as alternates:

- (Argentina) Mariano Kestelboim
- (Argentina) Lorenzo Joaquín Rodríguez

The following players received entry from the qualifying draw:

- (Argentina) Facundo Bagnis
- (Argentina) Hernán Casanova
- (Argentina) Santiago de la Fuente
- (Argentina) Lautaro Agustín Falabella
- (Italy) Facundo Juárez
- (Argentina) Carlos María Zárate

== Champions ==
=== Singles ===
- (United States) Emilio Nava def. (Argentina) Alex Barrena 6–3, 6–3.

=== Doubles ===
- (Argentina) Guillermo Durán / (Argentina) Mariano Kestelboim def. (Brazil) Daniel Dutra da Silva / (Argentina) Gonzalo Villanueva 6–4, 6–2.
