= 2022 Challenger de Villa María – Singles =

Singles
- 2022 Challenger de Villa María

Final
- Champion: (Argentina) Nicolás Kicker
- Runner-up: (Argentina) Mariano Navone
- Score: 7–5, 6–3

Events
Singles	Doubles
- Challenger de Villa María

This was the first edition of the tournament.

Nicolás Kicker won the title after defeating Mariano Navone 7–5, 6–3 in the final.

== Seeds ==
1. (Peru) Juan Pablo Varillas (second round, retired)
2. (Argentina) Camilo Ugo Carabelli (second round)
3. (Argentina) Facundo Bagnis (semifinals)
4. (Brazil) Felipe Meligeni Alves (first round)
5. (Germany) Yannick Hanfmann (quarterfinals)
6. (Argentina) Santiago Rodríguez Taverna (first round)
7. (Argentina) Renzo Olivo (quarterfinals)
8. (Argentina) Juan Manuel Cerúndolo (quarterfinals)

== Draw ==
Key

- Q = Qualifier
- WC = Wild card
- LL = Lucky loser
- Alt = Alternate
- ITF = ITF entry
- PR = Protected ranking
- SR = Special ranking
- SE = Special exempt
- JE = Junior exempt
- JR = Junior Accelerator Programme entrant
- CO = College Accelerator Programme entrant
- NG = Next Gen Accelerator Program entrant
- w/o = Walkover
- r = Retired
- d = Defaulted

=== Finals ===
Semifinals
(Argentina) Facundo Díaz Acosta	7^{7}	6^{6}	4
(Argentina) Nicolás Kicker	6^{3}	7^{8}	6
3	(Argentina) Facundo Bagnis	3	3
(Argentina) Mariano Navone	6	6

Final
(Argentina) Nicolás Kicker	7	6
(Argentina) Mariano Navone	5	3

=== Top half ===
First round
1	(Peru) JP Varillas	5	6	6
(Peru) N Álvarez	7	4	3
(Argentina) F Díaz Acosta	6	4
Q	(Argentina) MF Descotte	0	1^{r}
Q	(Argentina) Franco Emanuel Egea	4	6	0
(Spain) P Martín Tiffon	6	2	6
(Argentina) F Comesaña	1	0^{r}
5	(Germany) Y Hanfmann	6	0
4	(Brazil) F Meligeni Alves	1	1
(Argentina) N Kicker	6	6
Alt	(Argentina) Facundo Juárez	7	6
(Italy) L Darderi	5	4
Q	(Argentina) Ignacio Monzón	3	3
WC	(Argentina) L Midón	6	6
WC	(Argentina) A Barrena	6^{5}	0
7	(Argentina) R Olivo	7^{7}	6

Second round
1	(Peru) JP Varillas	0	2^{r}
(Argentina) F Díaz Acosta	6	2
(Spain) P Martín Tiffon	6	5	3
5	(Germany) Y Hanfmann	3	7	6
(Argentina) N Kicker	6	6
Alt	(Argentina) F Juárez	3	1
WC	(Argentina) L Midón	7	3	6^{4}
7	(Argentina) R Olivo	5	6	7^{7}

Quarterfinals
(Argentina) F Díaz Acosta	6	7^{8}
5	(Germany) Y Hanfmann	1	6^{6}
(Argentina) N Kicker	6	6
7	(Argentina) R Olivo	2	0

Semifinals
(Argentina) F Díaz Acosta	7^{7}	6^{6}	4
(Argentina) N Kicker	6^{3}	7^{8}	6

=== Bottom half ===
First round
6	(Argentina) S Rodríguez Taverna	6	1	4
(Argentina) A Collarini	4	6	6
(Argentina) H Casanova	6	6
Q	(Argentina) JP Paz	3	1
(Argentina) RA Burruchaga	6^{2}	2
(Brazil) D Dutra da Silva	7^{7}	6
Q	(Brazil) O Luz	2	4
3	(Argentina) F Bagnis	6	6
8	(Argentina) JM Cerúndolo	7^{7}	6
(Argentina) GA Olivieri	6^{5}	3
(Kazakhstan) D Popko	0	2
WC	(Argentina) Juan Bautista Otegui	6	6
(Argentina) M Navone	7^{7}	6
(Argentina) G Villanueva	6^{5}	3
Q	(Argentina) AL Lingua Lavallén	2	0
2	(Argentina) C Ugo Carabelli	6	6

Second round
(Argentina) A Collarini	4	5
(Argentina) H Casanova	6	7
(Brazil) D Dutra da Silva	6	2	2
3	(Argentina) F Bagnis	4	6	6
8	(Argentina) JM Cerúndolo	4	6	6
WC	(Argentina) JB Otegui	6	3	4
(Argentina) M Navone	6	7^{7}
2	(Argentina) C Ugo Carabelli	1	6^{2}

Quarterfinals
(Argentina) H Casanova	3	3
3	(Argentina) F Bagnis	6	6
8	(Argentina) JM Cerúndolo	2	6^{5}
(Argentina) M Navone	6	7^{7}

Semifinals
3	(Argentina) F Bagnis	3	3
(Argentina) M Navone	6	6
