= 2026 Challenger de Villa María – Singles =

Singles
- 2026 Challenger de Villa María

Final
- Champion: (Argentina) Juan Manuel La Serna
- Runner-up: (Argentina) Genaro Alberto Olivieri
- Score: 6–2, 6–3

Events
Singles	Doubles
- Challenger de Villa María

Emilio Nava was the defending champion but chose not to defend his title.

Juan Manuel La Serna won the title after defeating Genaro Alberto Olivieri 6–2, 6–3 in the final.

== Seeds ==
1. (Argentina) Juan Manuel La Serna (champion)
2. (Argentina) Genaro Alberto Olivieri (final)
3. (Argentina) Valerio Aboian (second round)
4. (Spain) Oriol Roca Batalla (quarterfinals)
5. (Argentina) Juan Bautista Torres (quarterfinals)
6. (Argentina) Gonzalo Villanueva (first round)
7. (Uruguay) Joaquín Aguilar Cardozo (withdrew)
8. (Argentina) Nicolás Kicker (semifinals)

== Draw ==
Key

- Q = Qualifier
- WC = Wild card
- LL = Lucky loser
- Alt = Alternate
- ITF = ITF entry
- PR = Protected ranking
- SR = Special ranking
- SE = Special exempt
- JE = Junior exempt
- JR = Junior Accelerator Programme entrant
- CO = College Accelerator Programme entrant
- NG = Next Gen Accelerator Program entrant
- w/o = Walkover
- r = Retired
- d = Defaulted

=== Finals ===
Semifinals
1	(Argentina) Juan Manuel La Serna	6	7
8	(Argentina) Nicolás Kicker	4	5
PR	(Argentina) Federico Coria	6	3	0^{r}
2	(Argentina) Genaro Alberto Olivieri	3	6	0

Final
1	(Argentina) Juan Manuel La Serna	6	6
2	(Argentina) Genaro Alberto Olivieri	2	3

=== Top half ===
First round
1	(Argentina) JM La Serna	4	6	7
Q	(Argentina) Mateo del Pino	6	0	5
(Argentina) Thiago Cigarrán	6	5	4
(Argentina) H Casanova	1	7	6
(Argentina) Lucio Ratti	6	4	6
(Argentina) Máximo Zeitune	4	6	3
(Argentina) Carlos María Zárate	6	7^{7}
6	(Argentina) G Villanueva	3	6^{5}
4	(Spain) O Roca Batalla	6	6
WC	(Argentina) Juan Ignacio Gallego	1	0
(Argentina) Juan Estévez	6	3	4
Q	(Japan) Ryo Tabata	4	6	6
(Argentina) Lorenzo Joaquín Rodríguez	5	7	4
Q	(Uruguay) Federico Aguilar Cardozo	7	5	6
(Brazil) Bruno Fernandez	4	6	1
8	(Argentina) N Kicker	6	3	6

Second round
1	(Argentina) JM La Serna	7^{7}	4	6
(Argentina) H Casanova	6^{3}	6	3
(Argentina) L Ratti	4	4
(Argentina) CM Zárate	6	6
4	(Spain) O Roca Batalla	6	6
Q	(Japan) R Tabata	1	3
Q	(Uruguay) F Aguilar Cardozo	1	2
8	(Argentina) N Kicker	6	6

Quarterfinals
1	(Argentina) JM La Serna	6	6
(Argentina) CM Zárate	3	4
4	(Spain) O Roca Batalla	3	1
8	(Argentina) N Kicker	6	6

Semifinals
1	(Argentina) JM La Serna	6	7
8	(Argentina) N Kicker	4	5

=== Bottom half ===
First round
LL	(Argentina) F Ribero	3	0
(Argentina) JP Ficovich	6	6
WC	(Argentina) Dante Pagani	2	6	3
(Bolivia) M Dellien	6	2	6
PR	(Argentina) F Coria	6	6
Q	(Argentina) Ivan Dreycopp	3	0
(Mexico) A Magadán	6	1	1
3	(Argentina) V Aboian	4	6	6
5	(Argentina) JB Torres	6	6
Q	(Chile) Nicolás Bruna	4	1
Q	(Italy) Lorenzo Gagliardo	7^{7}	6^{3}	4
(Netherlands) Ryan Nijboer	6^{5}	7^{7}	6
(Italy) F Agamenone	4	7	6^{1}
(Argentina) Ignacio Monzón	6	5	7^{7}
WC	(Argentina) Valentino Grippo	2	2
2	(Argentina) GA Olivieri	6	6

Second round
(Argentina) JP Ficovich	6	6
(Bolivia) M Dellien	0	4
PR	(Argentina) F Coria	6	6
3	(Argentina) V Aboian	4	4
5	(Argentina) JB Torres	6	6
(Netherlands) R Nijboer	3	4
(Argentina) I Monzón	3	1
2	(Argentina) GA Olivieri	6	6

Quarterfinals
(Argentina) JP Ficovich	2	1
PR	(Argentina) F Coria	6	6
5	(Argentina) JB Torres	4	2
2	(Argentina) GA Olivieri	6	6

Semifinals
PR	(Argentina) F Coria	6	3	0^{r}
2	(Argentina) GA Olivieri	3	6	0
