= 2022 Challenger de Villa María – Doubles =

Doubles
- 2022 Challenger de Villa María

Final
- Champions: (Argentina) Hernán Casanova (Argentina) Santiago Rodríguez Taverna
- Runners-up: (Argentina) Facundo Juárez (Argentina) Ignacio Monzón
- Score: 6–4, 6–3

Events
Singles	Doubles
Challenger de Villa María	· 2024 →

This was the first edition of the tournament.

Hernán Casanova and Santiago Rodríguez Taverna won the title after defeating Facundo Juárez and Ignacio Monzón 6–4, 6–3 in the final.

== Seeds ==
1. (Argentina) Andrea Collarini / (Argentina) Renzo Olivo (first round)
2. (Argentina) Guido Andreozzi / (Argentina) Guillermo Durán (semifinals)
3. (Argentina) Hernán Casanova / (Argentina) Santiago Rodríguez Taverna (champions)
4. (Argentina) Román Andrés Burruchaga / (Argentina) Facundo Díaz Acosta (semifinals)

== Draw ==
=== Key ===
- Q = Qualifier
- WC = Wild card
- LL = Lucky loser
- Alt = Alternate
- SE = Special exempt
- PR = Protected ranking
- ITF = ITF entry
- JE = Junior exempt
- w/o = Walkover
- r = Retired
- d = Defaulted
- SR = Special ranking

First round
1	(Argentina) A Collarini (Argentina) R Olivo	5	4
(Argentina) Facundo Juárez (Argentina) Ignacio Monzón	7	6
WC	(Argentina) Tomás Farjat (Argentina) AL Lingua Lavallén	6	6
Alt	(Brazil) Wilson Leite (Brazil) E Ribeiro	4	4
4	(Argentina) RA Burruchaga (Argentina) F Díaz Acosta	6	6
(Brazil) O Luz (Brazil) M Zormann	1	4
(Argentina) Franco Emanuel Egea (Argentina) Juan Bautista Otegui	4	4
(Brazil) D Dutra da Silva (Brazil) P Sakamoto	6	6
(Brazil) J Pereira (Brazil) JL Reis da Silva	6^{3}	6^{5}
3	(Argentina) H Casanova (Argentina) S Rodríguez Taverna	7^{7}	7^{7}
(Peru) A Merino (Argentina) GA Olivieri	3	5
(Argentina) M Navone (Spain) C Sánchez Jover	6	7

Quarterfinals
(Argentina) F Juárez (Argentina) I Monzón	7^{8}	6
WC	(Argentina) T Farjat (Argentina) AL Lingua Lavallén	6^{6}	4
4	(Argentina) RA Burruchaga (Argentina) F Díaz Acosta	6	5	[10]
WC	(Argentina) Bruno Caula (Argentina) Agustín Picco	2	7	[3]
(Brazil) D Dutra da Silva (Brazil) P Sakamoto	4	4
3	(Argentina) H Casanova (Argentina) S Rodríguez Taverna	6	6
(Argentina) M Navone (Spain) C Sánchez Jover	4	5
2	(Argentina) G Andreozzi (Argentina) G Durán	6	7

Semifinals
(Argentina) F Juárez (Argentina) I Monzón	7^{8}	6
4	(Argentina) RA Burruchaga (Argentina) F Díaz Acosta	6^{6}	3
3	(Argentina) H Casanova (Argentina) S Rodríguez Taverna	3	6	[10]
2	(Argentina) G Andreozzi (Argentina) G Durán	6	3	[6]

Final
(Argentina) F Juárez (Argentina) I Monzón	4	3
3	(Argentina) H Casanova (Argentina) S Rodríguez Taverna	6	6
