= 2026 Challenger Tucumán – Singles =

Singles
- 2026 Challenger Tucumán

Final
- Champion: (Argentina) Luciano Emanuel Ambrogi
- Runner-up: (Colombia) Johan Alexander Rodríguez
- Score: 6–2, 6–3

Events
Singles	Doubles
- Challenger Tucumán

Alex Barrena was the defending champion but chose not to defend his title.

Luciano Emanuel Ambrogi won the title after defeating Johan Alexander Rodríguez 6–2, 6–3 in the final.

== Seeds ==
1. (Argentina) Guido Iván Justo (semifinals)
2. (Argentina) Andrea Collarini (second round)
3. (Argentina) Juan Bautista Torres (first round)
4. (Argentina) Juan Manuel La Serna (first round)
5. (Chile) Matías Soto (first round)
6. (Argentina) Facundo Mena (withdrew)
7. (Argentina) Nicolás Kicker (semifinals)
8. (Argentina) Luciano Emanuel Ambrogi (champion)

== Draw ==
Key

- Q = Qualifier
- WC = Wild card
- LL = Lucky loser
- Alt = Alternate
- ITF = ITF entry
- PR = Protected ranking
- SR = Special ranking
- SE = Special exempt
- JE = Junior exempt
- JR = Junior Accelerator Programme entrant
- CO = College Accelerator Programme entrant
- NG = Next Gen Accelerator Program entrant
- w/o = Walkover
- r = Retired
- d = Defaulted

=== Finals ===
Semifinals
1	(Argentina) Guido Iván Justo	6	5	2
8	(Argentina) Luciano Emanuel Ambrogi	4	7	6
Q	(Colombia) Johan Alexander Rodríguez	6	6
7	(Argentina) Nicolás Kicker	3	4

Final
8	(Argentina) Luciano Emanuel Ambrogi	6	6
Q	(Colombia) Johan Alexander Rodríguez	2	3

=== Top half ===
First round
1	(Argentina) GI Justo	6	6
(Uruguay) J Aguilar Cardozo	2	3
Q	(Colombia) Samuel Heredia	2	3
(Argentina) H Casanova	6	6
Q	(Argentina) Thiago Cigarrán	6	6
LL	(Brazil) Wilson Leite	4	3
(Argentina) Juan Estévez	6	6
5	(Chile) M Soto	4	2
3	(Argentina) JB Torres	1	6^{3}
(Argentina) Carlos María Zárate	6	7^{7}
WC	(Argentina) Máximo Zeitune	7^{7}	4	5
Q	(Peru) A Huertas del Pino	6^{1}	6	7
(Morocco) K Bennani	3	6	1
(Argentina) S Rodríguez Taverna	6	3	6
(Colombia) JS Gómez	2	4
8	(Argentina) LE Ambrogi	6	6

Second round
1	(Argentina) GI Justo	6	4	6
(Argentina) H Casanova	3	6	4
Q	(Argentina) T Cigarrán	6^{5}	6	6
(Argentina) J Estévez	7^{7}	3	2
(Argentina) CM Zárate	6	7^{8}
Q	(Peru) A Huertas del Pino	3	6^{6}
(Argentina) S Rodríguez Taverna	5	7^{7}	0
8	(Argentina) LE Ambrogi	7	6^{3}	6

Quarterfinals
1	(Argentina) GI Justo	6	6
Q	(Argentina) T Cigarrán	4	4
(Argentina) CM Zárate	2	6	4
8	(Argentina) LE Ambrogi	6	1	6

Semifinals
1	(Argentina) GI Justo	6	5	2
8	(Argentina) LE Ambrogi	4	7	6

=== Bottom half ===
First round
Q	(Chile) Nicolás Villalón	2	7^{7}	3
(Argentina) Lorenzo Joaquín Rodríguez	6	6^{5}	6
(United States) Ryan Dickerson	1	1
(Brazil) M Pucinelli de Almeida	6	6
(Brazil) E Ribeiro	6	7
(Argentina) S de la Fuente	3	5
Q	(Colombia) Johan Alexander Rodríguez	3	6	7
4	(Argentina) JM La Serna	6	0	5
7	(Argentina) N Kicker	6	6
Q	(Argentina) Tomás Martínez	0	4
(Dominican Republic) N Hardt	7	6
(Brazil) Bruno Fernandez	5	2
WC	(Argentina) Segundo Goity Zapico	5	7	6^{7}
WC	(Argentina) F Coria	7	5	7^{9}
LL	(Argentina) Julián Cúndom	2	4
2	(Argentina) A Collarini	6	6

Second round
(Argentina) LJ Rodríguez	2	2
(Brazil) M Pucinelli de Almeida	6	6
(Brazil) E Ribeiro	6	4	4
Q	(Colombia) JA Rodríguez	0	6	6
7	(Argentina) N Kicker	6	7
(Dominican Republic) N Hardt	2	5
WC	(Argentina) F Coria	7^{7}	7
2	(Argentina) A Collarini	6^{5}	5

Quarterfinals
(Brazil) M Pucinelli de Almeida	5	4
Q	(Colombia) JA Rodríguez	7	6
7	(Argentina) N Kicker	7	3
WC	(Argentina) F Coria	5	0^{r}

Semifinals
Q	(Colombia) JA Rodríguez	6	6
7	(Argentina) N Kicker	3	4
