= 2024 Challenger Tucumán – Doubles =

Doubles
- 2024 Challenger Tucumán

Final
- Champions: (Brazil) Luís Britto (Argentina) Gonzalo Villanueva
- Runners-up: (Australia) Patrick Harper (United Kingdom) David Stevenson
- Score: 6–3, 6–2

Events
Singles	Doubles
- Challenger Tucumán

This was the first edition of the tournament.

Luís Britto and Gonzalo Villanueva won the title after defeating Patrick Harper and David Stevenson 6–3, 6–2 in the final.

== Seeds ==
1. (Brazil) Daniel Dutra da Silva / (Argentina) Mariano Kestelboim (first round)
2. (Brazil) Luís Britto / (Argentina) Gonzalo Villanueva (champions)
3. (Argentina) Andrea Collarini / (Argentina) Renzo Olivo (quarterfinals)
4. (Uruguay) Ignacio Carou / (Argentina) Hernán Casanova (semifinals)

== Draw ==
Key

- Q = Qualifier
- WC = Wild card
- LL = Lucky loser
- Alt = Alternate
- ITF = ITF entry
- PR = Protected ranking
- SR = Special ranking
- SE = Special exempt
- JE = Junior exempt
- JR = Junior Accelerator Programme entrant
- CO = College Accelerator Programme entrant
- NG = Next Gen Accelerator Program entrant
- w/o = Walkover
- r = Retired
- d = Defaulted

=== Draw ===
First round
1	(Brazil) D Dutra da Silva (Argentina) M Kestelboim	6^{8}	3
(Australia) P Harper (United Kingdom) D Stevenson	7^{10}	6
WC	(Argentina) Gonzalo Zeitune (Argentina) Máximo Zeitune	6	6
(Argentina) Tomás Farjat (Argentina) Ignacio Monzón	3	3
3	(Argentina) A Collarini (Argentina) R Olivo	6	6
WC	(Argentina) Julián Cúndom (Argentina) Ezequiel Simonit	2	1
(Argentina) Leonardo Aboian (Argentina) V Aboian	7^{7}	6
(Israel) R Stepanov (Colombia) A Urrea	6^{5}	1
(Japan) S Watanabe (Japan) T Yuzuki	6	6
(Argentina) GI Justo (Turkey) E Kırkın	3	3
(United States) Preston Brown (United States) Felix Corwin	4	6^{6}
4	(Uruguay) I Carou (Argentina) H Casanova	6	7^{8}
(Brazil) J Pereira (Japan) K Uchida	6	6^{4}	[6]
(Argentina) Mateo del Pino (Argentina) L Midón	2	7^{7}	[10]
(Brazil) Igor Gimenez (Uruguay) F Roncadelli	4	4
2	(Brazil) L Britto (Argentina) G Villanueva	6	6

Quarterfinals
(Australia) P Harper (United Kingdom) D Stevenson	6	6
WC	(Argentina) G Zeitune (Argentina) M Zeitune	2	4
3	(Argentina) A Collarini (Argentina) R Olivo	6	2	[7]
(Argentina) L Aboian (Argentina) V Aboian	2	6	[10]
(Japan) S Watanabe (Japan) T Yuzuki	4	6	[8]
4	(Uruguay) I Carou (Argentina) H Casanova	6	2	[10]
(Argentina) M del Pino (Argentina) L Midón	6^{4}	6^{5}
2	(Brazil) L Britto (Argentina) G Villanueva	7^{7}	7^{7}

Semifinals
(Australia) P Harper (United Kingdom) D Stevenson	6	6
(Argentina) L Aboian (Argentina) V Aboian	3	2
4	(Uruguay) I Carou (Argentina) H Casanova	6^{4}	3
2	(Brazil) L Britto (Argentina) G Villanueva	7^{7}	6

Final
(Australia) P Harper (United Kingdom) D Stevenson	3	2
2	(Brazil) L Britto (Argentina) G Villanueva	6	6
