= 2026 Challenger de Villa María =

- Date: 2 – 8 November
- Edition: 4th
- Location: Villa María, Argentina

Champions

Singles
- (Argentina) Juan Manuel La Serna

Doubles
- (Argentina) Facundo Bagnis / (Argentina) Gonzalo Villanueva
- Challenger de Villa María

The 2026 Challenger de Villa María was a professional tennis tournament played on clay courts. It was the tournament's fourth edition and part of the 2026 ATP Challenger Tour. It took place in Villa María, Argentina, between 2 and 8 November 2026.

== Singles main-draw entrants ==
=== Seeds ===
Country	Player	Rank^{1}	Seed
ARG	Juan Manuel La Serna	251	1
ARG	Genaro Alberto Olivieri	257	2
ARG	Valerio Aboian	283	3
ESP	Oriol Roca Batalla	288	4
ARG	Juan Bautista Torres	298	5
ARG	Gonzalo Villanueva	318	6
~~URU~~	~~Joaquín Aguilar Cardozo~~	~~332~~	~~7~~
ARG	Nicolás Kicker	333	8

- ^{1} Rankings are as of 26 October 2026.

=== Other entrants ===
The following players received wildcards into the singles main draw:

- (Argentina) Juan Ignacio Gallego
- (Argentina) Valentino Grippo
- (Argentina) Dante Pagani

The following player received entry into the singles main draw using a protected ranking:

- (Argentina) Federico Coria

The following players received entry from the qualifying draw:

- (Uruguay) Federico Aguilar Cardozo
- (Chile) Nicolás Bruna
- (Argentina) Mateo del Pino
- (Argentina) Ivan Dreycopp
- (Italy) Lorenzo Gagliardo
- (Japan) Ryo Tabata

The following player received entry as a lucky loser:

- (Argentina) Franco Ribero

== Champions ==
=== Singles ===
- (Argentina) Juan Manuel La Serna def. (Argentina) Genaro Alberto Olivieri 6–2, 6–3.

=== Doubles ===
- (Argentina) Facundo Bagnis / (Argentina) Gonzalo Villanueva def. (Netherlands) Ryan Nijboer / (Spain) Oriol Roca Batalla via walkover.
