= 2026 Challenger Tucumán – Doubles =

Doubles
- 2026 Challenger Tucumán

Final
- Champions: (Argentina) Hernán Casanova (Argentina) Santiago Rodríguez Taverna
- Runners-up: (Argentina) Mateo del Pino (United States) Ryan Dickerson
- Score: 3–6, 6–3, [10–7]

Events
| Singles | Doubles |
- Challenger Tucumán

Conner Huertas del Pino and Federico Zeballos were the defending champions but chose to defend their title with different partners. Huertas del Pino partnered Arklon Huertas del Pino but lost in the first round to Thiago Cigarrán and Matheus Pucinelli de Almeida. Zeballos partnered Eduardo Ribeiro but lost in the quarterfinals to Hernán Casanova and Santiago Rodríguez Taverna.

Casanova and Rodríguez Taverna won the title after defeating Mateo del Pino and Ryan Dickerson 3–6, 6–3, [10–7] in the final.

== Seeds ==
1. (Brazil) Eduardo Ribeiro / (Bolivia) Federico Zeballos (quarterfinals)
2. (Brazil) Luís Britto / (Uruguay) Ignacio Carou (first round)
3. (Argentina) Andrea Collarini / (Argentina) Nicolás Kicker (quarterfinals, withdrew)
4. (Peru) Arklon Huertas del Pino / (Peru) Conner Huertas del Pino (first round)

== Draw ==
Key

- Q = Qualifier
- WC = Wild card
- LL = Lucky loser
- Alt = Alternate
- ITF = ITF entry
- PR = Protected ranking
- SR = Special ranking
- SE = Special exempt
- JE = Junior exempt
- JR = Junior Accelerator Programme entrant
- CO = College Accelerator Programme entrant
- NG = Next Gen Accelerator Program entrant
- w/o = Walkover
- r = Retired
- d = Defaulted

First round
1 | (Brazil) E Ribeiro (Bolivia) F Zeballos | 6 | 6
Alt | (Argentina) Juan Estévez (Argentina) Gonzalo Zeitune | 2 | 0
WC | (Argentina) Julián Cúndom (Argentina) Segundo Goity Zapico | 2 | 2
(Argentina) H Casanova (Argentina) S Rodríguez Taverna | 6 | 6
3 | (Argentina) A Collarini (Argentina) N Kicker | 2 | 6 | [10]
(Argentina) Valentín Basel (Colombia) JS Gómez | 6 | 3 | [8]
(Uruguay) J Aguilar Cardozo (Argentina) S de la Fuente | 7^{7} | 6
(Argentina) Tomás Martínez (Argentina) Ezequiel Monferrer | 6^{3} | 3
(Argentina) Mateo del Pino (United States) Ryan Dickerson | 6 | 6
WC | (Argentina) Juan Ignacio Gallego (Argentina) Agustín Libre | 2 | 2
(Argentina) Thiago Cigarrán (Brazil) M Pucinelli de Almeida | 6 | 6
4 | (Peru) A Huertas del Pino (Peru) C Huertas del Pino | 2 | 4
(Argentina) Lorenzo Joaquín Rodríguez (Argentina) Carlos María Zárate
(Argentina) LE Ambrogi (Argentina) Máximo Zeitune | w/o
(Argentina) Ignacio Monzón (Chile) Nicolás Villalón | 6 | 6^{2} | [10]
2 | (Brazil) L Britto (Uruguay) I Carou | 3 | 7^{7} | [7]

Quarterfinals
1 | (Brazil) E Ribeiro (Bolivia) F Zeballos | 7 | 4 | [7]
(Argentina) H Casanova (Argentina) S Rodríguez Taverna | 5 | 6 | [10]
3 | (Argentina) A Collarini (Argentina) N Kicker
(Uruguay) J Aguilar Cardozo (Argentina) S de la Fuente | w/o
(Argentina) M del Pino (United States) R Dickerson | w/o
(Argentina) T Cigarrán (Brazil) M Pucinelli de Almeida
(Argentina) LE Ambrogi (Argentina) M Zeitune
(Argentina) I Monzón (Chile) N Villalón | w/o

Semifinals
(Argentina) H Casanova (Argentina) S Rodríguez Taverna | 7 | 6
(Uruguay) J Aguilar Cardozo (Argentina) S de la Fuente | 5 | 4
(Argentina) M del Pino (United States) R Dickerson | 6 | 6
(Argentina) I Monzón (Chile) N Villalón | 3 | 4

Final
(Argentina) H Casanova (Argentina) S Rodríguez Taverna | 3 | 6 | [10]
(Argentina) M del Pino (United States) R Dickerson | 6 | 3 | [7]
