= 2026 Challenger de Villa María – Doubles =

Doubles
- 2026 Challenger de Villa María

Final
- Champions: (Argentina) Facundo Bagnis (Argentina) Gonzalo Villanueva
- Runners-up: (Netherlands) Ryan Nijboer (Spain) Oriol Roca Batalla
- Score: Walkover

Events
Singles	Doubles
- Challenger de Villa María

Guillermo Durán and Mariano Kestelboim were the defending champions but chose not to defend their title.

Facundo Bagnis and Gonzalo Villanueva won the title after Ryan Nijboer and Oriol Roca Batalla withdrew before the final.

== Seeds ==
1. (Argentina) Hernán Casanova / (Argentina) Franco Ribero (quarterfinals)
2. (Bolivia) Murkel Dellien / (Peru) Arklon Huertas del Pino (semifinals)
3. (Argentina) Thiago Cigarrán / (Argentina) Lucio Ratti (quarterfinals)
4. (Brazil) João Victor Couto Loureiro / (Brazil) Victor Pagotto (quarterfinals)

== Draw ==
Key

- Q = Qualifier
- WC = Wild card
- LL = Lucky loser
- Alt = Alternate
- ITF = ITF entry
- PR = Protected ranking
- SR = Special ranking
- SE = Special exempt
- JE = Junior exempt
- JR = Junior Accelerator Programme entrant
- CO = College Accelerator Programme entrant
- NG = Next Gen Accelerator Program entrant
- w/o = Walkover
- r = Retired
- d = Defaulted

First round
1	(Argentina) H Casanova (Argentina) F Ribero	3	6	[10]
(Italy) F Agamenone (Argentina) Juan Estévez	6	4	[4]
WC	(Argentina) Valentín Garay (Argentina) Dante Pagani	4	6	[5]
(Argentina) Mateo del Pino (Argentina) Máximo Zeitune	6	4	[10]
3	(Argentina) Thiago Cigarrán (Argentina) Lucio Ratti	w/o
(Uruguay) Federico Aguilar Cardozo (Argentina) N Kicker
(Argentina) Ignacio Monzón (Argentina) Lorenzo Joaquín Rodríguez	2	6	[11]
(Netherlands) Ryan Nijboer (Spain) O Roca Batalla	6	3	[13]
WC	(Argentina) F Bagnis (Argentina) G Villanueva	6	6
(Argentina) Nicolás Hollender (Argentina) GA Olivieri	3	4
(Argentina) V Aboian (Brazil) Bruno Fernandez	6	4	[10]
Alt	(Chile) Nicolás Bruna (Italy) Lorenzo Gagliardo	3	6	[8]
(Argentina) Tadeo Meneo (Argentina) Fermín Tenti	1	6^{4}
2	(Bolivia) M Dellien (Peru) A Huertas del Pino	6	7^{7}

Quarterfinals
1	(Argentina) H Casanova (Argentina) F Ribero	6	4	[6]
(Argentina) M del Pino (Argentina) M Zeitune	4	6	[10]
3	(Argentina) T Cigarrán (Argentina) L Ratti	1	2
(Netherlands) R Nijboer (Spain) O Roca Batalla	6	6
WC	(Argentina) F Bagnis (Argentina) G Villanueva	6	6
4	(Brazil) JVC Loureiro (Brazil) Victor Pagotto	3	4
(Argentina) V Aboian (Brazil) B Fernandez	1	3
2	(Bolivia) M Dellien (Peru) A Huertas del Pino	6	6

Semifinals
(Argentina) M del Pino (Argentina) M Zeitune
(Netherlands) R Nijboer (Spain) O Roca Batalla	w/o
WC	(Argentina) F Bagnis (Argentina) G Villanueva	6	6
2	(Bolivia) M Dellien (Peru) A Huertas del Pino	4	3

Final
(Netherlands) R Nijboer (Spain) O Roca Batalla
WC	(Argentina) F Bagnis (Argentina) G Villanueva	w/o
