= 2026 Challenger Tucumán =

- Date: 8–14 June
- Edition: 3rd
- Surface: Clay
- Location: San Miguel de Tucumán, Argentina

Champions

Singles
- (Argentina) Luciano Emanuel Ambrogi

Doubles
- (Argentina) Hernán Casanova / (Argentina) Santiago Rodríguez Taverna
- Challenger Tucumán

The 2026 AAT Challenger Santander Tucumán was a professional tennis tournament played on clay courts. It was the third edition of the tournament which was part of the 2026 ATP Challenger Tour. It took place in San Miguel de Tucumán, Argentina between 8 and 14 June 2026.

== Singles main-draw entrants ==
=== Seeds ===
Country	Player	Rank^{1}	Seed
ARG	Guido Iván Justo	253	1
ARG	Andrea Collarini	278	2
ARG	Juan Bautista Torres	281	3
ARG	Juan Manuel La Serna	288	4
CHI	Matías Soto	300	5
~~ARG~~	~~Facundo Mena~~	~~303~~	~~6~~
ARG	Nicolás Kicker	358	7
ARG	Luciano Emanuel Ambrogi	379	8

- ^{1} Rankings as of 25 May 2026.

=== Other entrants ===
The following players received wildcards into the singles main draw:

- (Argentina) Federico Coria
- (Argentina) Segundo Goity Zapico
- (Argentina) Máximo Zeitune

The following players received entry from the qualifying draw:

- (Argentina) Thiago Cigarrán
- (Colombia) Samuel Heredia
- (Peru) Arklon Huertas del Pino
- (Argentina) Tomás Martínez
- (Colombia) Johan Alexander Rodríguez
- (Chile) Nicolás Villalón

The following players received entry as lucky losers:

- (Argentina) Julián Cúndom
- (Brazil) Wilson Leite

== Champions ==
=== Singles ===
- (Argentina) Luciano Emanuel Ambrogi def. (Colombia) Johan Alexander Rodríguez 6–2, 6–3.

=== Doubles ===
- (Argentina) Hernán Casanova / (Argentina) Santiago Rodríguez Taverna def. (Argentina) Mateo del Pino / (United States) Ryan Dickerson 3–6, 6–3, [10–7].
