= 2024 Challenger Tucumán =

- Date: 15–21 April 2024
- Edition: 1st
- Surface: Clay
- Location: San Miguel de Tucumán, Argentina

Champions

Singles
- (Argentina) Andrea Collarini

Doubles
- (Brazil) Luís Britto / (Argentina) Gonzalo Villanueva
- Challenger Tucumán

The 2024 AAT Challenger Santander edición Tucumán was a professional tennis tournament played on clay courts. It was the 1st edition of the tournament which was part of the 2024 ATP Challenger Tour. It took place in San Miguel de Tucumán, Argentina between 15 and 21 April 2024.

== Singles main-draw entrants ==
=== Seeds ===
Country	Player	Rank^{1}	Seed
ARG	Genaro Alberto Olivieri	174	1
ARG	Renzo Olivo	278	2
ARG	Andrea Collarini	279	3
TUR	Ergi Kırkın	302	4
ARG	Hernán Casanova	390	5
ARG	Gonzalo Villanueva	433	6
ARG	Valerio Aboian	434	7
ARG	Luciano Emanuel Ambrogi	443	8

- ^{1} Rankings as of 8 April 2024.

=== Other entrants ===
The following players received wildcards into the singles main draw:

- (Argentina) Lautaro Midón
- (Argentina) Bautista Vilicich
- (Argentina) Máximo Zeitune

The following players received entry into the singles main draw as alternates:

- (United States) Jacob Brumm
- (Brazil) Igor Gimenez
- (Argentina) Juan Bautista Otegui

The following players received entry from the qualifying draw:

- (Uruguay) Ignacio Carou
- (United States) Felix Corwin
- (Brazil) Bruno Fernandez
- (Argentina) Nikos Lehmann
- (Argentina) Alejo Lorenzo Lingua Lavallén
- (Bulgaria) Leonid Sheyngezikht

== Champions ==
=== Singles ===
- (Argentina) Andrea Collarini def. (Argentina) Hernán Casanova 6–4, 7–6^{(7–3)}.

=== Doubles ===
- (Brazil) Luís Britto / (Argentina) Gonzalo Villanueva def. (Australia) Patrick Harper / (United Kingdom) David Stevenson 6–3, 6–2.
