= 2025 Challenger Tucumán =

- Date: 21–27 April
- Edition: 2nd
- Surface: Clay
- Location: San Miguel de Tucumán, Argentina

Champions

Singles
- (Argentina) Alex Barrena

Doubles
- (Peru) Conner Huertas del Pino / (Bolivia) Federico Zeballos
- Challenger Tucumán

The 2025 AAT Challenger Santander Tucumán was a professional tennis tournament played on clay courts. It was the second edition of the tournament which was part of the 2025 ATP Challenger Tour. It took place in San Miguel de Tucumán, Argentina between 21 and 27 April 2025.

== Singles main-draw entrants ==
=== Seeds ===
Country	Player	Rank^{1}	Seed
ARG	Andrea Collarini	193	1
ECU	Álvaro Guillén Meza	211	2
BOL	Murkel Dellien	221	3
ARG	Santiago Rodríguez Taverna	265	4
ARG	Juan Bautista Torres	269	5
ARG	Lautaro Midón	309	6
URU	Franco Roncadelli	345	7
ARG	Renzo Olivo	346	8

- ^{1} Rankings as of 14 April 2025.

=== Other entrants ===
The following players received wildcards into the singles main draw:

- (Argentina) Facundo Bagnis
- (Argentina) Juan Manuel La Serna
- (Argentina) Máximo Zeitune

The following players received entry from the qualifying draw:

- (Brazil) Mateo Barreiros Reyes
- (Brazil) Igor Gimenez
- (Peru) Conner Huertas del Pino
- (Argentina) Ignacio Monzón
- (Argentina) Fermín Tenti
- (Brazil) Nicolas Zanellato

== Champions ==
=== Singles ===
- (Argentina) Alex Barrena def. (Argentina) Santiago Rodríguez Taverna 7–5, 6–2.

=== Doubles ===
- (Peru) Conner Huertas del Pino / (Bolivia) Federico Zeballos def. (Argentina) Luciano Emanuel Ambrogi / (Argentina) Máximo Zeitune 1–6, 6–2, [10–8].
