= 2024 Challenger de Villa María =

- Date: 6 – 13 October
- Edition: 2nd
- Location: Villa María, Argentina

Champions

Singles
- (Argentina) Camilo Ugo Carabelli

Doubles
- (Brazil) Orlando Luz / (Brazil) Marcelo Zormann
- Challenger de Villa María

The 2024 AAT Challenger Santander edición Villa María was a professional tennis tournament played on clay courts. It was the tournament's second edition and part of the 2024 ATP Challenger Tour. It took place in Villa María, Argentina, between 6 and 13 October 2024.

== Singles main-draw entrants ==
=== Seeds ===
Country	Player	Rank^{1}	Seed
ARG	Federico Coria	94	1
ARG	Francisco Comesaña	104	2
BOL	Hugo Dellien	108	3
ARG	Camilo Ugo Carabelli	112	4
NED	Jesper de Jong	118	5
ARG	Román Andrés Burruchaga	130	6
ARG	Juan Manuel Cerúndolo	154	7
ARG	Federico Agustín Gómez	160	8

- ^{1} Rankings are as of 30 September 2024.

=== Other entrants ===
The following players received wildcards into the singles main draw:

- (Argentina) Luciano Emanuel Ambrogi
- (Argentina) Juan Ignacio Londero
- (Argentina) Juan Bautista Torres

The following players received entry into the singles main draw as alternates:

- (Argentina) Renzo Olivo
- (Brazil) Pedro Sakamoto

The following players received entry from the qualifying draw:

- (Brazil) Mateus Alves
- (Argentina) Nicolás Kicker
- (Argentina) Lautaro Midón
- (Argentina) Genaro Alberto Olivieri
- (Brazil) Matheus Pucinelli de Almeida
- (Argentina) Gonzalo Villanueva

== Champions ==
=== Singles ===
- (Argentina) Camilo Ugo Carabelli def. (Netherlands) Jesper de Jong 7–6^{(7–3)}, 3–6, 6–4.

=== Doubles ===
- (Brazil) Orlando Luz / (Brazil) Marcelo Zormann def. (Bolivia) Boris Arias / (Bolivia) Federico Zeballos 0–6, 6–3, [10–4].
