= 2026 Quito Challenger – Doubles =

Doubles
- 2026 Quito Challenger

Final
- Champions: (Chile) Matías Soto (Bolivia) Federico Zeballos
- Runners-up: (Argentina) Hernán Casanova (Brazil) Pedro Sakamoto
- Score: 6–1, 6–4

Events
Singles	Doubles
- Quito Challenger

Alejandro Gómez and Thiago Agustín Tirante were the defending champions from when the tournament was last held in 2021 but did not defend their title.

Matías Soto and Federico Zeballos won the title after defeating Hernán Casanova and Pedro Sakamoto 6–1, 6–4 in the final.

== Seeds ==
1. (Chile) Matías Soto / (Bolivia) Federico Zeballos (champions)
2. (Brazil) Bruno Oliveira / (Brazil) Matheus Pucinelli de Almeida (first round)
3. (Colombia) Juan Sebastián Gómez / (Brazil) Natan Rodrigues (quarterfinals)
4. (Brazil) Luís Britto / (Brazil) Gustavo Ribeiro de Almeida (quarterfinals)

== Draw ==
Key

- Q = Qualifier
- WC = Wild card
- LL = Lucky loser
- Alt = Alternate
- ITF = ITF entry
- PR = Protected ranking
- SR = Special ranking
- SE = Special exempt
- JE = Junior exempt
- JR = Junior Accelerator Programme entrant
- CO = College Accelerator Programme entrant
- NG = Next Gen Accelerator Program entrant
- w/o = Walkover
- r = Retired
- d = Defaulted

First round
1	(Chile) M Soto (Bolivia) F Zeballos	7^{10}	6
(Colombia) Samuel Heredia (Colombia) A Urrea	6^{8}	2
(Peru) M Echazú (Colombia) Juan Sebastián Osorio	6	7
(Mexico) LC Álvarez (Mexico) A Hernández	1	5
3	(Colombia) JS Gómez (Brazil) Natan Rodrigues	6	6
(Mexico) A Magadán (Colombia) Johan Alexander Rodríguez	4	4
(Argentina) Ignacio Monzón (Argentina) Fermín Tenti	6	3	[6]
(Argentina) V Aboian (Brazil) Bruno Fernandez	3	6	[10]
(Argentina) H Casanova (Brazil) P Sakamoto	7^{8}	6
WC	(Ecuador) Mario André Galarraga (Ecuador) Lucas Yúnez	6^{6}	0
WC	(Ecuador) Felipe Rivadeneira (Ecuador) Ángel Véliz	6	6^{4}	[10]
4	(Brazil) L Britto (Brazil) Gustavo Ribeiro de Almeida	4	7^{7}	[12]
(Argentina) JM La Serna (Brazil) E Ribeiro	6	3	[10]
(Dominican Republic) P Bertran (United States) Mwendwa Mbithi	1	6	[3]
PR	(Brazil) Lucas Andrade da Silva (Brazil) F Meligeni Alves	6	6
2	(Brazil) Bruno Oliveira (Brazil) M Pucinelli de Almeida	2	4

Quarterfinals
1	(Chile) M Soto (Bolivia) F Zeballos	6	7^{7}
(Peru) M Echazú (Colombia) JS Osorio	3	6^{2}
3	(Colombia) JS Gómez (Brazil) N Rodrigues	2	6^{5}
(Argentina) V Aboian (Brazil) B Fernandez	6	7^{7}
(Argentina) H Casanova (Brazil) P Sakamoto	7	6
4	(Brazil) L Britto (Brazil) GR de Almeida	5	4
(Argentina) JM La Serna (Brazil) E Ribeiro	7^{7}	7
PR	(Brazil) L Andrade da Silva (Brazil) F Meligeni Alves	6^{4}	5

Semifinals
1	(Chile) M Soto (Bolivia) F Zeballos	7^{7}	6
(Argentina) V Aboian (Brazil) B Fernandez	6^{2}	1
(Argentina) H Casanova (Brazil) P Sakamoto	w/o
(Argentina) JM La Serna (Brazil) E Ribeiro

Final
1	(Chile) M Soto (Bolivia) F Zeballos	6	6
(Argentina) H Casanova (Brazil) P Sakamoto	1	4
