= 2026 Quito Challenger =

- Date: 29 June – 5 July
- Edition: 23rd
- Surface: Clay
- Location: Quito, Ecuador

Champions

Singles
- (Brazil) Matheus Pucinelli de Almeida

Doubles
- (Chile) Matías Soto / (Bolivia) Federico Zeballos
- Quito Challenger

The 2026 Quito Challenger was a professional tennis tournament played on clay courts. It was the 23rd edition of the tournament which was part of the 2026 ATP Challenger Tour. It took place in Quito, Ecuador between 29 June and 5 July 2026.

== Singles main-draw entrants ==
=== Seeds ===
Country	Player	Rank^{1}	Seed
ARG	Juan Manuel La Serna	298	1
CHI	Matías Soto	300	2
PER	Juan Pablo Varillas	309	3
MEX	Rodrigo Pacheco Méndez	341	4
ARG	Facundo Mena	353	5
BRA	Eduardo Ribeiro	376	6
ARG	Hernán Casanova	406	7
BRA	Matheus Pucinelli de Almeida	409	8

- ^{1} Rankings are as of 22 June 2026.

=== Other entrants ===
The following players received wildcards into the singles main draw:

- (Ecuador) Mario André Galarraga
- (Ecuador) Felipe Rivadeneira
- (Ecuador) Ángel Véliz

The following players received entry into the singles main draw as alternates:

- (Dominican Republic) Peter Bertran
- (United States) Mwendwa Mbithi
- (Kazakhstan) Dmitry Popko

The following players received entry from the qualifying draw:

- (Brazil) Lucas Andrade da Silva
- (Brazil) Gustavo Ribeiro de Almeida
- (Argentina) Segundo Goity Zapico
- (Argentina) Tomás Martínez
- (Brazil) Felipe Meligeni Alves
- (Colombia) Juan Sebastián Osorio

== Champions ==
=== Singles ===
- (Brazil) Matheus Pucinelli de Almeida def. (Argentina) Hernán Casanova 5–7, 6–3, 6–2.

=== Doubles ===
- (Chile) Matías Soto / (Bolivia) Federico Zeballos def. (Argentina) Hernán Casanova / (Brazil) Pedro Sakamoto 6–1, 6–4.
