= 2022 Challenger de Villa María =

- Date: 19 – 25 September
- Edition: 1st
- Location: Villa María, Argentina

Champions

Singles
- (Argentina) Nicolás Kicker

Doubles
- (Argentina) Hernán Casanova / (Argentina) Santiago Rodríguez Taverna
Challenger de Villa María	· 2024 →

The 2022 Dove Men+Care Legión Sudamericana Challenger de Villa María was a professional tennis tournament played on clay courts. It was the tournament's first edition, part of the 2022 ATP Challenger Tour. It took place in Villa María, Argentina, between 19 and 25 September 2022.

== Singles main-draw entrants ==
=== Seeds ===
Country	Player	Rank^{1}	Seed
PER	Juan Pablo Varillas	100	1
ARG	Camilo Ugo Carabelli	116	2
ARG	Facundo Bagnis	117	3
BRA	Felipe Meligeni Alves	143	4
GER	Yannick Hanfmann	153	5
ARG	Santiago Rodríguez Taverna	158	6
ARG	Renzo Olivo	169	7
ARG	Juan Manuel Cerúndolo	186	8

- ^{1} Rankings are as of 12 September 2022.

=== Other entrants ===
The following players received wildcards into the singles main draw:

- (Argentina) Alex Barrena
- (Argentina) Lautaro Midón
- (Argentina) Juan Bautista Otegui

The following player received entry into the singles main draw as an alternate:

- (Argentina) Facundo Juárez

The following players received entry from the qualifying draw:

- (Argentina) Matías Franco Descotte
- (Argentina) Franco Emanuel Egea
- (Argentina) Alejo Lorenzo Lingua Lavallén
- (Brazil) Orlando Luz
- (Argentina) Ignacio Monzón
- (Argentina) Juan Pablo Paz

== Champions ==
=== Singles ===
- (Argentina) Nicolás Kicker def. (Argentina) Mariano Navone 7–5, 6–3.

=== Doubles ===
- (Argentina) Hernán Casanova / (Argentina) Santiago Rodríguez Taverna def. (Argentina) Facundo Juárez / (Argentina) Ignacio Monzón 6–4, 6–3.
