= 2026 Quito Challenger – Singles =

Singles
- 2026 Quito Challenger

Final
- Champion: (Brazil) Matheus Pucinelli de Almeida
- Runner-up: (Argentina) Hernán Casanova
- Score: 5–7, 6–3, 6–2

Events
Singles	Doubles
- Quito Challenger

Facundo Mena was the defending champion but lost in the first round to Valerio Aboian.

Matheus Pucinelli de Almeida won the title after defeating Hernán Casanova 5–7, 6–3, 6–2 in the final.

== Seeds ==
1. (Argentina) Juan Manuel La Serna (second round)
2. (Chile) Matías Soto (second round)
3. (Peru) Juan Pablo Varillas (second round)
4. (Mexico) Rodrigo Pacheco Méndez (quarterfinals)
5. (Argentina) Facundo Mena (first round)
6. (Brazil) Eduardo Ribeiro (second round)
7. (Argentina) Hernán Casanova (final)
8. (Brazil) Matheus Pucinelli de Almeida (champion)

== Draw ==
Key

- Q = Qualifier
- WC = Wild card
- LL = Lucky loser
- Alt = Alternate
- ITF = ITF entry
- PR = Protected ranking
- SR = Special ranking
- SE = Special exempt
- JE = Junior exempt
- JR = Junior Accelerator Programme entrant
- CO = College Accelerator Programme entrant
- NG = Next Gen Accelerator Program entrant
- w/o = Walkover
- r = Retired
- d = Defaulted

=== Finals ===
Semifinals
(Colombia) Samuel Heredia	3	6	4
8	(Brazil) Matheus Pucinelli de Almeida	6	4	6
Q	(Brazil) Felipe Meligeni Alves	6^{5}	5
7	(Argentina) Hernán Casanova	7^{7}	7

Final
8	(Brazil) Matheus Pucinelli de Almeida	5	6	6
7	(Argentina) Hernán Casanova	7	3	2

=== Top half ===
First round
1	(Argentina) JM La Serna	6	4	6
(Mexico) A Hernández	3	6	1
(Colombia) JS Gómez	2	6^{3}
(Argentina) Ignacio Monzón	6	7^{7}
Q	(Brazil) Gustavo Ribeiro de Almeida	3	4
(Colombia) Samuel Heredia	6	6
Q	(Argentina) Tomás Martínez	4	4
6	(Brazil) E Ribeiro	6	6
3	(Peru) JP Varillas	6	4	6
Alt	(Kazakhstan) D Popko	2	6	4
(Brazil) P Sakamoto	6	3	5
(Mexico) A Magadán	2	6	7
WC	(Ecuador) Ángel Véliz	6	3	1
(Chile) Daniel Antonio Núñez	3	6	6
(Colombia) Johan Alexander Rodríguez	5	3
8	(Brazil) M Pucinelli de Almeida	7	6

Second round
1	(Argentina) JM La Serna	2	3
(Argentina) I Monzón	6	6
(Colombia) S Heredia	6	6
6	(Brazil) E Ribeiro	4	4
3	(Peru) JP Varillas	1	4
(Mexico) A Magadán	6	6
(Chile) DA Núñez	2	0
8	(Brazil) M Pucinelli de Almeida	6	6

Quarterfinals
(Argentina) I Monzón	2	4
(Colombia) S Heredia	6	6
(Mexico) A Magadán	1	7^{7}	4
8	(Brazil) M Pucinelli de Almeida	6	6^{4}	6

Semifinals
(Colombia) S Heredia	3	6	4
8	(Brazil) M Pucinelli de Almeida	6	4	6

=== Bottom half ===
First round
5	(Argentina) F Mena	2	0
(Argentina) V Aboian	6	6
Q	(Brazil) Lucas Andrade da Silva	1	2
Q	(Brazil) F Meligeni Alves	6	6
Q	(Argentina) Segundo Goity Zapico	6	6
(Colombia) Samuel Alejandro Linde Palacios	1	2
(Brazil) Bruno Fernandez	7	2	4
4	(Mexico) R Pacheco Méndez	5	6	6
7	(Argentina) H Casanova	6	6
WC	(Ecuador) Mario André Galarraga	0	2
WC	(Ecuador) Felipe Rivadeneira	3	1
(Mexico) LC Álvarez	6	6
Q	(Colombia) Juan Sebastián Osorio	2	7^{7}	6
Alt	(Dominican Republic) P Bertran	6	6^{5}	2
Alt	(United States) Mwendwa Mbithi	6	4	6^{4}
2	(Chile) M Soto	1	6	7^{7}

Second round
(Argentina) V Aboian	2	4
Q	(Brazil) F Meligeni Alves	6	6
Q	(Argentina) S Goity Zapico	2	2
4	(Mexico) R Pacheco Méndez	6	6
7	(Argentina) H Casanova	7	6
(Mexico) LC Álvarez	5	2
Q	(Colombia) JS Osorio	4	6	6
2	(Chile) M Soto	6	3	2

Quarterfinals
Q	(Brazil) F Meligeni Alves	2	7^{8}	7^{7}
4	(Mexico) R Pacheco Méndez	6	6^{6}	6^{5}
7	(Argentina) H Casanova	6	7^{7}
Q	(Colombia) JS Osorio	2	6^{3}

Semifinals
Q	(Brazil) F Meligeni Alves	6^{5}	5
7	(Argentina) H Casanova	7^{7}	7
