= 2025 Tucumán Open =

- Date: 3–9 November 2025
- Edition: 1st
- Category: WTA 125
- Prize money: $115,000
- Surface: Clay
- Location: San Miguel de Tucumán, Argentina

Champions

Singles
- (Ukraine) Oleksandra Oliynykova

Doubles
- (Netherlands) Lian Tran / Anastasia Zolotareva
- Challenger Tucumán

The 2025 Tucumán Open by McDonald's was the first edition of the Tucumán Open, a professional WTA 125 tournament held on outdoor clay at the Tucumán Lawn Tennis Club, in San Miguel de Tucumán, Argentina. It was part of the 2025 WTA 125 tournaments.

It took place between 3 and 9 November, 2025. This is the second WTA 125 tournament to take place in Argentina after the Argentina Open in Buenos Aires.

== Singles main draw entrants ==
=== Seeds ===
Country	Player	Rank^{1}	Seed
ARG	Solana Sierra	67	1
SUI	Simona Waltert	94	2
EGY	Mayar Sherif	103	3
HUN	Panna Udvardy	108	4
ARM	Elina Avanesyan	120	5
ARG	María Lourdes Carlé	127	6
UKR	Oleksandra Oliynykova	135	7
FRA	Carole Monnet	168	8

- ^{1} Rankings as of 27 October 2025.

=== Other entrants ===
The following players received a wildcard into the singles main draw:

- (Argentina) Martina Capurro Taborda
- (Argentina) Luna María Cinalli
- (Argentina) Candela Vázquez
- (Chile) Antonia Vergara Rivera

The following players received entry into the singles main draw through protected ranking:

- (Slovenia) Polona Hercog
- ~~(Argentina) Paula Ormaechea~~

The following players received entry from the qualifying draw:

- (Argentina) Carla Markus
- (Bulgaria) Gergana Topalova
- (Argentina) María Florencia Urrutia
- Anastasia Zolotareva

The following player received entry as a lucky loser:

- (Brazil) Gabriela Cé

=== Withdrawals ===
Before the tournament

- (Czech Republic) Sára Bejlek → replaced by (Argentina) Luisina Giovannini
- (Poland) Maja Chwalińska → replaced by (Australia) Tina Smith
- (Austria) Julia Grabher → replaced by (Argentina) Jazmín Ortenzi
- (Poland) Katarzyna Kawa → replaced by (Netherlands) Lian Tran
- (Argentina) Paula Ormaechea → replaced by (Brazil) Gabriela Cé (LL)
- (Spain) Leyre Romero Gormaz → replaced by (Spain) Alicia Herrero Liñana
- (Italy) Martina Trevisan → replaced by (Italy) Jessica Pieri
- (Croatia) Tara Würth → replaced by (Georgia (country)) Ekaterine Gorgodze

== Doubles entrants ==
=== Seeds ===
Country	Player	Country	Player	Rank^{1}	Seed
ITA	Nicole Fossa Huergo	GEO	Ekaterine Gorgodze	248	1
ESP	Alicia Herrero Liñana	UKR	Valeriya Strakhova	257	2

- Rankings as of 27 October 2025.

=== Other entrants ===
The following pair received a wildcard into the doubles main draw:

- (Argentina) Carla Markus / (Argentina) María Florencia Urrutia

== Champions ==
=== Singles ===
- (Ukraine) Oleksandra Oliynykova def. (Egypt) Mayar Sherif 3–6, 6–2, 6–2

=== Doubles ===
- (Netherlands) Lian Tran / Anastasia Zolotareva def. (Spain) Alicia Herrero Liñana / (Ukraine) Valeriya Strakhova 2–6, 6–1, [10–6]
