= 2025 Tucumán Open – Singles =

Singles
- 2025 Tucumán Open

Final
- Champion: (Ukraine) Oleksandra Oliynykova
- Runner-up: (Egypt) Mayar Sherif
- Score: 3–6, 6–2, 6–2

Events
Singles	Doubles
Challenger Tucumán	· 2026 →

Oleksandra Oliynykova won the title, defeating Mayar Sherif in the final, 3–6, 6–2, 6–2.

This was the first edition of the tournament.

== Seeds ==
1. (Argentina) Solana Sierra (quarterfinals)
2. (Switzerland) Simona Waltert (semifinals)
3. (Egypt) Mayar Sherif (final)
4. (Hungary) Panna Udvardy (first round)
5. (Armenia) Elina Avanesyan (first round)
6. (Argentina) María Lourdes Carlé (first round)
7. (Ukraine) Oleksandra Oliynykova (champion)
8. (France) Carole Monnet (second round)

== Draw ==
Key

- Q = Qualifier
- WC = Wild card
- LL = Lucky loser
- Alt = Alternate
- ITF = ITF entry
- PR = Protected ranking
- SR = Special ranking
- SE = Special exempt
- JE = Junior exempt
- JR = Junior Accelerator Programme entrant
- CO = College Accelerator Programme entrant
- NG = Next Gen Accelerator Program entrant
- w/o = Walkover
- r = Retired
- d = Defaulted

=== Finals ===
Semifinals
7	(Ukraine) Oleksandra Oliynykova	6	3	6
(Greece) Despina Papamichail	2	6	1
3	(Egypt) Mayar Sherif	6	5	6
2	(Switzerland) Simona Waltert	4	7	2

Final
7	(Ukraine) Oleksandra Oliynykova	3	6	6
3	(Egypt) Mayar Sherif	6	2	2

=== Top half ===
First round
1	(Argentina) S Sierra	6	7
(Romania) M Bulgaru	3	5
(Brazil) L Pigossi	6^{5}	2
Q	(Argentina) C Markus	7^{7}	6
(Italy) J Pieri	7^{7}	6
Q	(Argentina) MF Urrutia	6^{4}	2
(Spain) A Herrero Liñana	5	6^{3}
7	(Ukraine) O Oliynykova	7	7^{7}
4	(Hungary) P Udvardy	4	4
(Greece) D Papamichail	6	6
(France) S Janicijevic	3	2
(Australia) T Smith	6	6
WC	(Argentina) C Vázquez	0	2
(Argentina) J Ortenzi	6	6
(Georgia (country)) E Gorgodze	6	6
5	(Armenia) E Avanesyan	3	3

Second round
1	(Argentina) S Sierra	6	6
Q	(Argentina) C Markus	3	1
(Italy) J Pieri	2	1^{r}
7	(Ukraine) O Oliynykova	6	3
(Greece) D Papamichail	6	5	6
(Australia) T Smith	4	7	2
(Argentina) J Ortenzi	6	6
(Georgia (country)) E Gorgodze	0	3

Quarterfinals
1	(Argentina) S Sierra	3	2
7	(Ukraine) O Oliynykova	6	6
(Greece) D Papamichail	6	6
(Argentina) J Ortenzi	0	4

Semifinals
7	(Ukraine) O Oliynykova	6	3	6
(Greece) D Papamichail	2	6	1

=== Bottom half ===
First round
6	(Argentina) ML Carlé	2	4
WC	(Chile) A Vergara Rivera	6	6
(Netherlands) L Tran	1	0
(Argentina) L Giovannini	6	6
WC	(Argentina) LM Cinalli	1	5
Q	A Zolotareva	6	7
PR	(Slovenia) P Hercog	6^{4}	6^{6}
3	(Egypt) M Sherif	7^{7}	7^{8}
8	(France) C Monnet	6	6
Q	(Bulgaria) G Topalova	3	1
(Ukraine) V Strakhova	0	0
(Argentina) J Riera	6	6
LL	(Brazil) G Cé	6	3
(Italy) N Fossa Huergo	4	0^{r}
WC	(Argentina) M Capurro Taborda	1	2
2	(Switzerland) S Waltert	6	6

Second round
WC	(Chile) A Vergara Rivera	7^{8}	2	6
(Argentina) L Giovannini	6^{6}	6	1
Q	A Zolotareva	2	1
3	(Egypt) M Sherif	6	6
8	(France) C Monnet	6^{5}	6	4
(Argentina) J Riera	7^{7}	2	6
LL	(Brazil) G Cé	4	4
2	(Switzerland) S Waltert	6	6

Quarterfinals
WC	(Chile) A Vergara Rivera	1	2
3	(Egypt) M Sherif	6	6
(Argentina) J Riera	7	5	3
2	(Switzerland) S Waltert	5	7	6

Semifinals
3	(Egypt) M Sherif	6	5	6
2	(Switzerland) S Waltert	4	7	2

== Qualifying ==
=== Seeds ===
1. (Brazil) Gabriela Cé (qualifying competition, lucky loser)
2. Anastasia Zolotareva (qualified)
3. (Bulgaria) Gergana Topalova (qualified)
4. (Brazil) Ana Candiotto (qualifying competition)

=== Qualifiers ===
1. (Argentina) Carla Markus
2. Anastasia Zolotareva
3. (Bulgaria) Gergana Topalova
4. (Argentina) María Florencia Urrutia

=== Lucky loser ===
1. (Brazil) Gabriela Cé

=== Qualifying draw ===
==== First qualifier ====
Qualifying competition
1	(Brazil) Gabriela Cé	1	0
WC	(Argentina) Carla Markus	6	6

==== Second qualifier ====
Qualifying competition
2	Anastasia Zolotareva	6	6
	(Bolivia) Noelia Zeballos	4	4

==== Third qualifier ====
Qualifying competition
3	(Bulgaria) Gergana Topalova	5	6	7
WC	(Argentina) Berta Bonardi	7	3	5

==== Fourth qualifier ====
Qualifying competition
4	(Brazil) Ana Candiotto	3	6	3
	(Argentina) María Florencia Urrutia	6	4	6
