= 2025 Tucumán Open – Doubles =

Doubles
- 2025 Tucumán Open

Final
- Champion: (Netherlands) Lian Tran; Anastasia Zolotareva
- Runner-up: (Spain) Alicia Herrero Liñana (Ukraine) Valeriya Strakhova
- Score: 2–6, 6–1, [10–6]

Events
Singles	Doubles
- Challenger Tucumán

Lian Tran and Anastasia Zolotareva won the title, defeating Alicia Herrero Liñana and Valeriya Strakhova in the final, 2–6, 6–1, [10–6].

This was the first edition of the tournament.

== Seeds ==
1. (Italy) Nicole Fossa Huergo / (Georgia (country)) Ekaterine Gorgodze (quarterfinals)
2. (Spain) Alicia Herrero Liñana / (Ukraine) Valeriya Strakhova (final)

== Draw ==
Key

- Q = Qualifier
- WC = Wild card
- LL = Lucky loser
- Alt = Alternate
- ITF = ITF entry
- PR = Protected ranking
- SR = Special ranking
- SE = Special exempt
- JE = Junior exempt
- JR = Junior Accelerator Programme entrant
- CO = College Accelerator Programme entrant
- NG = Next Gen Accelerator Program entrant
- w/o = Walkover
- r = Retired
- d = Defaulted

=== Draw ===
Quarterfinals
1	(Italy) N Fossa Huergo (Georgia (country)) E Gorgodze	4	6	[8]
(Netherlands) L Tran; A Zolotareva	6	4	[10]
(Italy) J Pieri (Australia) T Smith	4	4
(Argentina) J Ortenzi (Argentina) J Riera	6	6
(France) C Monnet (Brazil) L Pigossi	4	6	[10]
WC	(Argentina) C Markus (Argentina) MF Urrutia	6	3	[7]
(Argentina) L Giovannini (Mexico) M Gómez Pezuela Cano	4	1
2	(Spain) A Herrero Liñana (Ukraine) V Strakhova	6	6

Semifinals
(Netherlands) L Tran; A Zolotareva	6	4	[10]
(Argentina) J Ortenzi (Argentina) J Riera	3	6	[5]
(France) C Monnet (Brazil) L Pigossi	3	6	[9]
2	(Spain) A Herrero Liñana (Ukraine) V Strakhova	6	4	[11]

Final
(Netherlands) L Tran; A Zolotareva	2	6	[10]
2	(Spain) A Herrero Liñana (Ukraine) V Strakhova	6	1	[6]
