= Challenger Tucumán =

- 2025 Challenger Tucumán

Tournament information
- Event name: AAT Challenger Santander Tucumán (ATP); Tucumán Open by McDonald's (WTA)
- Location: San Miguel de Tucumán, Argentina
- Venue: Tucumán Lawn Tennis Club, Parque 9 de Julio
- Category: ATP Challenger Tour; WTA 125
- Surface: Clay
- Website: ATP Website; WTA Website

Current champions (ATP 2025, WTA 2025)
- Men's singles: (Argentina) Alex Barrena
- Women's singles: (Ukraine) Oleksandra Oliynykova
- Men's doubles: (Peru) Conner Huertas del Pino (Bolivia) Federico Zeballos
- Women's doubles: (Netherlands) Lian Tran; Anastasia Zolotareva
ATP Tour
- Category: ATP Challenger 50
- Draw: 32S / 32Q / 16D
- Prize money: $60,000
WTA Tour
- Category: WTA 125
- Draw: 32S / 16Q / 16D
- Prize money: $115,000

The Challenger Tucumán is a professional tennis tournament played on clay courts. It is currently part of the ATP Challenger Tour and WTA 125 tournaments. The first edition for men was held in 2024 and for the women in 2025 in San Miguel de Tucumán, Argentina.

== Past finals ==
=== Women's singles ===
Year	Champion	Runner-up	Score
2025	(Ukraine) Oleksandra Oliynykova	(Egypt) Mayar Sherif	3–6, 6–2, 6–2

=== Men's singles ===
Year	Champion	Runner-up	Score
2026	(Argentina) Luciano Emanuel Ambrogi	(Colombia) Johan Alexander Rodríguez	6–2, 6–3
2025	(Argentina) Alex Barrena	(Argentina) Santiago Rodríguez Taverna	7–5, 6–2
2024	(Argentina) Andrea Collarini	(Argentina) Hernán Casanova	6–4, 7–6^{(7–3)}

=== Women's doubles ===
Year	Champions	Runners-up	Score
2025	(Netherlands) Lian Tran; Anastasia Zolotareva	(Spain) Alicia Herrero Liñana (Ukraine) Valeriya Strakhova	2–6, 6–1, [10–6]

=== Men's doubles ===
Year	Champions	Runners-up	Score
2026	(Argentina) Hernán Casanova (Argentina) Santiago Rodríguez Taverna	(Argentina) Mateo del Pino (United States) Ryan Dickerson	3–6, 6–3, [10–7]
2025	(Peru) Conner Huertas del Pino (Bolivia) Federico Zeballos	(Argentina) Luciano Emanuel Ambrogi (Argentina) Máximo Zeitune	1–6, 6–2, [10–8]
2024	(Brazil) Luís Britto (Argentina) Gonzalo Villanueva	(Australia) Patrick Harper (United Kingdom) David Stevenson	6–3, 6–2
