= Challenger de Villa María =

Tennis tournament in Argentina

AAT Challenger Villa María
- 2025 Challenger de Villa María

ATP Challenger Tour
- Event name: AAT Challenger Santander Villa María
- Location: Villa María, Argentina
- Venue: Sport Social Club Villa María
- Category: ATP Challenger Tour (2022, 2025-), Challenger 100 (2024)
- Surface: Clay
- Prize money: $100,000 (2025), $133,250 (2024)
- Website: Website

Current champions (2024)
- Singles: (Argentina) Camilo Ugo Carabelli
- Doubles: (Brazil) Orlando Luz (Brazil) Marcelo Zormann

The AAT Challenger Santander Villa María is a professional tennis tournament played on clay courts. It is currently part of the Association of Tennis Professionals (ATP) Challenger Tour. It has been held in Villa María, Argentina, since 2022.

== Past finals ==
=== Singles ===
Year	Champion	Runner-up	Score
2026	(Argentina) Juan Manuel La Serna	(Argentina) Genaro Alberto Olivieri	6–2, 6–3
2025	(United States) Emilio Nava	(Argentina) Alex Barrena	6–3, 6–3
2024	(Argentina) Camilo Ugo Carabelli	(Netherlands) Jesper de Jong	7–6^{(7–3)}, 3–6, 6–4
2023	Not held		
2022	(Argentina) Nicolás Kicker	(Argentina) Mariano Navone	7–5, 6–3

=== Doubles ===
Year	Champions	Runners-up	Score
2026	(Argentina) Facundo Bagnis (Argentina) Gonzalo Villanueva	(Netherlands) Ryan Nijboer (Spain) Oriol Roca Batalla	walkover
2025	(Argentina) Guillermo Durán (Argentina) Mariano Kestelboim	(Brazil) Daniel Dutra da Silva (Argentina) Gonzalo Villanueva	6–4, 6–2
2024	(Brazil) Orlando Luz (Brazil) Marcelo Zormann	(Bolivia) Boris Arias (Bolivia) Federico Zeballos	0–6, 6–3, [10–4]
2023	Not held		
2022	(Argentina) Hernán Casanova (Argentina) Santiago Rodríguez Taverna	(Argentina) Facundo Juárez (Argentina) Ignacio Monzón	6–4, 6–3
