= Luís Britto =

Brazilian tennis player (born 1993)

- Country (sports): Brazil
- Born: 23 June 1993 (age 32) Araçatuba, Brazil
- Height: 1.80 m (5 ft 11 in)
- Plays: Right-handed (two-handed backhand)
- Prize money: $66.669

Singles
- Career record: 0–0
- Career titles: 0
- Highest ranking: No. 1098 (29 August 2022)
- Current ranking: No. 1590 (30 June 2025)

Doubles
- Career record: 0–0
- Career titles: 2 Challenger, 4 ITF
- Highest ranking: No. 142 (30 June 2025)
- Current ranking: No. 142 (30 June 2025)
- Last updated on: 30 June 2025.

Luís Britto (born 23 June 1993) is a Brazilian tennis player.

He has a career high ATP doubles ranking of world No. 142 achieved on 30 June 2025. Britto also has a career high ATP singles ranking of No. 1098 achieved on 29 August 2022.

== Career ==
Britto won his ATP Challenger titles at the 2024 Challenger Tucumán in doubles partnering Gonzalo Villanueva. And the other one at the Kia Open Bogotá 2025 with Zdeněk Kolář.
