= Genaro Alberto Olivieri =

Argentine tennis player

- Olivieri at the 2026 Wimbledon Championships
- Country (sports): Argentina
- Residence: Bragado, Argentina
- Born: 4 August 1998 (age 28) Bragado, Argentina
- Height: 1.75 m (5 ft 9 in)
- Turned pro: 2016
- Plays: Right-handed (two-handed backhand)
- Coach: Leonardo Olguín
- Prize money: US $819,764

Singles
- Career record: 2–1
- Career titles: 0
- Highest ranking: No. 131 (2 October 2023)
- Current ranking: No. 223 (31 August 2026)

Grand Slam singles results
- Australian Open: Q1 (2023, 2026)
- French Open: 3R (2023)
- Wimbledon: Q1 (2022, 2023, 2024, 2026)
- US Open: Q2 (2026)

Doubles
- Career record: 0–2
- Career titles: 0
- Highest ranking: No. 304 (29 August 2022)
- Last updated on: 1 September 2026.

Genaro Alberto Olivieri (born 4 August 1998) is an Argentine professional tennis player. He has a career-high ATP singles ranking of world No. 131, achieved on 2 October 2023. He also has a career-high doubles ranking of No. 304, achieved on 29 August 2022.

== Career ==
=== 2023: Grand Slam debut, first wins & third round, top 150 ===
Ranked No. 231, he made his Grand Slam main draw debut at the 2023 French Open, defeating Adrian Andreev in the last round of qualifying. Next, he defeated wildcard Giovanni Mpetshi Perricard in five sets to reach the second round. As a result, he moved 40 positions up, a couple of spots shy of his career-high ranking of No. 190 reached on 21 November 2022. Next, he defeated fellow qualifier Andrea Vavassori to reach the third round, having never recorded an ATP win previously in his career. He lost to Holger Rune in straight sets. As a result, he moved another 20 positions into the top 175 in the rankings on 12 June 2023. He reached a career-high singles ranking of world No. 131 on 2 October 2024.

== Personal life ==
Olivieri started playing tennis at the age of 6, splitting practice time with association football. He is a supporter of Boca Juniors.

== Performance timeline ==
Key
W	F	SF	QF	#R	RR	Q#	DNQ	A	NH

(W) winner; (F) finalist; (SF) semifinalist; (QF) quarterfinalist; (#R) rounds 4, 3, 2, 1; (RR) round-robin stage; (Q#) qualification round; (DNQ) did not qualify; (A) absent; (NH) not held; (SR) strike rate (events won / competed); (W–L) win–loss record.

=== Singles ===
Tournament!	2022	2023	2024	2025	2026	SR	W–L	Win %
Grand Slam tournaments
Australian Open	A	Q1	A	A	Q1	0 / 0	0–0	–
French Open	A	3R	Q1	A		0 / 1	2–1	67%
Wimbledon	Q1	Q1	Q1	A		0 / 0	0–0	–
US Open	Q1	Q1	A	A		0 / 0	0–0	–
Win–loss	0–0	2–1	0–0	0–0	0–0	0 / 1	2–1	67%
ATP Masters 1000
Indian Wells Masters	A	A	A	A		0 / 0	0–0	–
Miami Open	A	A	A	A		0 / 0	0–0	–
Monte Carlo Masters	A	A	A	A		0 / 0	0–0	–
Madrid Open	A	A	A	A		0 / 0	0-0	–
Italian Open	A	A	A	A		0 / 0	0–0	–
Canadian Open	A	A	A	A		0 / 0	0–0	–
Cincinnati Masters	A	A	A	A		0 / 0	0–0	–
Shanghai Masters	NH	A	A	A		0 / 0	0–0	–
Paris Masters	A	A	A	A		0 / 0	0–0	–
Win–loss	0–0	0–0	0–0	0–0	0–0	0 / 0	0–0	–

== ATP Challenger and ITF Tour finals ==
=== Singles: 17 (6–11) ===
Legend ATP Challenger Tour (3–3) ITF Futures Tour / World Tennis Tour (3–8)	Finals by surface Hard (0–2) Clay (6–9)

Result	W–L	Date	Tournament	Tier	Surface	Opponent	Score
Loss	0–1	Dec 2016	Chile F6 Santiago	Futures	Clay	(Chile) Alejandro Tabilo	4–6, 6–4, 3–6
Loss	0–2	Aug 2017	USA F26 Decatur	Futures	Hard	(Italy) Liam Caruana	6–7^{(4–7)}, 1–6
Loss	0–3	Mar 2018	Turkey F11 Antalya	Futures	Clay	(Russia) Ivan Nedelko	4–6, 1–6
Loss	0–4	Jul 2018	Italy F19 Gubbio	Futures	Clay	(Argentina) Camilo Ugo Carabelli	7–6^{(7–1)}, 1–6, 2–6
Loss	0–5	May 2019	M15 Buenos Aires	World Tennis Tour	Clay	(Argentina) Francisco Cerúndolo	6–7^{(2–7)}, 6–7^{(8–10)}
Loss	0–6	Jun 2019	M15 Tabarka	World Tennis Tour	Clay	(Argentina) Mateo Nicolás Martínez	2–6, 2–6
Loss	0–7	Jun 2019	M15 Tabarka	World Tennis Tour	Clay	(Spain) Nikolás Sánchez Izquierdo	6–3, 4–6, 4–6
Win	1–7	Jul 2019	M15 Buenos Aires	World Tennis Tour	Clay	(Argentina) Juan Pablo Ficovich	6–4, 2–6, 7–6^{(7–4)}
Win	2–7	Nov 2019	M25 Naples	World Tennis Tour	Clay	(Colombia) Cristian Rodríguez	7–5, 6–3
Loss	2–8	Jun 2021	M25 Tulsa	World Tennis Tour	Hard	(Argentina) Nicolás Kicker	4–6, 0–6
Win	3–8	Nov 2022	Montevideo, Uruguay	Challenger	Clay	(Argentina) Tomás Martín Etcheverry	6–7^{(3–7)}, 7–6^{(7–5)}, 6–3
Win	4–8	Feb 2023	M15 Tucumán, Argentina	World Tennis Tour	Clay	(Argentina) Franco Emanuel Egea	3–6, 6–4, 6–4
Win	5–8	Aug 2023	Santo Domingo, Dominican Republic	Challenger	Clay	(Argentina) Marco Trungelliti	7–5, 2–6, 6–4
Loss	5–9	Jul 2025	Liberec, Czech Republic	Challenger	Clay	(Peru) Gonzalo Bueno	2–6, 0–2 ret.
Loss	5–10	Sep 2025	Seville, Spain	Challenger	Clay	(Peru) Ignacio Buse	3–6, 6–3, 3–6
Win	6–10	Mar 2026	Santiago, Chile	Challenger	Clay	(Portugal) Henrique Rocha	6–4, 6–4
Loss	6–11	Nov 2026	Villa María, Argentina	Challenger	Clay	(Argentina) Juan Manuel La Serna	2–6, 3–6

=== Doubles: 10 (4–6) ===
Legend ATP Challenger Tour (0–2) ITF Futures Tour / World Tennis Tour (4–4)	Finals by surface Hard (0–0) Clay (4–6)

Result	W–L	Date	Tournament	Tier	Surface	Partner	Opponents	Score
Win	1–0	Jul 2018	Italy F18 Casinalbo	Futures	Clay	(Argentina) Camilo Ugo Carabelli	(Russia) Ivan Gakhov (Argentina) Matías Zukas	6–4, 3–6, [12–10]
Win	2–0	Jul 2018	Italy F20 Pontedera	Futures	Clay	(Argentina) Camilo Ugo Carabelli	(Argentina) Tomás Martín Etcheverry (Argentina) Matías Zukas	7–6^{(7–2)}, 6–7^{(7–9)}, [10–3]
Loss	2–1	Oct 2018	Peru F3 Lima	Futures	Clay	(Argentina) Manuel Peña López	(United States) Junior Alexander Ore (Peru) Jorge Panta	3–6, 3–6
Loss	2–2	Apr 2019	M15 Pinamar	World Tennis Tour	Clay	(Argentina) Camilo Ugo Carabelli	(Argentina) Tomás Lipovšek Puches (Argentina) Matías Zukas	1–6, 6–4, [2–10]
Loss	2–3	Jun 2019	M15 Tabarka	World Tennis Tour	Clay	(Argentina) Matías Zukas	(Argentina) Mariano Kestelboim (Argentina) Mateo Nicolás Martínez	2–6, 2–6
Win	3–3	June 2019	M15 Tabarka	World Tennis Tour	Clay	(Argentina) Nicolás Bianchi	(Argentina) Sebastián Báez (Spain) Nikolás Sánchez Izquierdo	6–4, 5–7, [10–4]
Loss	3–4	Aug 2019	M15 Eupen	World Tennis Tour	Clay	(Argentina) Gonzalo Villanueva	(Belgium) Michael Geerts (Dominican Republic) Nick Hardt	7–6^{(12–10)}, 2–6, [3–10]
Win	4–4	Feb 2021	M15 Antalya	World Tennis Tour	Clay	(Argentina) Pedro Cachin	(Colombia) Nicolás Mejía (Spain) Pedro Vives Marcos	5–7, 6–1, [14–12]
Loss	4–5	Nov 2021	Brasília, Brazil	Challenger	Clay	(Italy) Luciano Darderi	(Brazil) Mateus Alves (Brazil) Gustavo Heide	3–6, 3–6
Loss	4–6	Jun 2025	Santa Fe, Argentina	Challenger	Clay	(Argentina) Santiago de la Fuente	(Argentina) Mariano Kestelboim (Argentina) Gonzalo Villanueva	1–6, 6–2, [9–11]
