= Gonzalo Villanueva =

Argentine tennis player

- Country (sports): Argentina
- Born: 13 January 1995 (age 31) Paraná, Argentina
- Height: 1.75 m (5 ft 9 in)
- Plays: Right-handed (two-handed backhand)
- Coach: Antonio Pastorino
- Prize money: US $329,430

Singles
- Career record: 0–1
- Career titles: 0
- Highest ranking: No. 268 (10 October 2022)
- Current ranking: No. 328 (14 September 2026)

Doubles
- Career record: 0–2
- Career titles: 0; 2 Challengers
- Highest ranking: No. 155 (16 March 2026)
- Current ranking: No. 252 (14 September 2026)
- Last updated on: 16 September 2026.

Gonzalo Villanueva (born 13 January 1995) is an Argentine professional tennis player. He has a career-high ATP singles ranking of No. 268 achieved on 10 October 2022 and a best doubles ranking of No. 155 achieved on 16 March 2026.

== Career ==
Villanueva made his ATP main draw debut at the 2022 Los Cabos Open after entering the singles main draw as a lucky loser losing to Rinky Hijikata in qualifying. He won his maiden ATP Challenger title at the 2024 Challenger Tucumán in doubles partnering Luís Britto.

== ATP Challenger and ITF Tour finals ==
=== Singles: 22 (8 titles, 14 runner-ups) ===
Legend ATP Challenger Tour (0–1) ITF Futures/WTT (8–13)	Finals by surface Hard (0–1) Clay (8–13)

Result	W–L	Date	Tournament	Tier	Surface	Opponent	Score
Loss	0–1	Jun 2026	Piracicaba Challenger, Brazil	Challenger	Clay	(Brazil) Thiago Seyboth Wild	2–6, 2–6
Loss	0–1	May 2016	F8 Buenos Aires, Argentina	Futures	Clay	(Brazil) Daniel Dutra da Silva	6–4, 2–6, 3–6
Loss	0–2	Jul 2016	F3 Cali, Colombia	Futures	Clay	(Colombia) Roberto Quiroz	3–6, 1–6
Loss	0–3	Sep 2016	F28 San Sebastián, Spain	Futures	Clay	(Spain) Jaume Munar	6–3, 5–7, 3–6
Loss	0–4	Sep 2016	F30 Madrid, Spain	Futures	Clay	(Spain) Bernabé Zapata Miralles	2–6, 1–6
Loss	0–5	May 2018	F2 São Paulo, Brasil	Futures	Clay	(Brazil) Rafael Matos	1–6, 3–6
Loss	0–6	Jun 2018	F3 Córdoba, Argentina	Futures	Clay	(Argentina) Facundo Argüello	4–6, 6–7^{(5–7)}
Win	1–6	Sep 2018	F6 Buenos Aires, Argentina	Futures	Clay	(Argentina) Francisco Cerúndolo	6–0 6–3
Win	2–6	Sep 2018	F1 Trujillo, Peru	Futures	Clay	(Peru) Arklon Huertas del Pino	6–0, 6–3
Loss	2–7	Oct 2018	F2 Lima, Peru	Futures	Clay	(Chile) Bastian Malla	6–7^{(1–7)}, 4–6
Win	3–7	Jul 2019	M15 Gubbio, Italy	WTT	Clay	(Italy) Francesco Passaro	7–5, 6–2
Win	4–7	Aug 2019	M15 Eupen, Belgium	WTT	Clay	(Belgium) Michael Geerts	6–4, 6–1
Win	5–7	Aug 2019	M15 Lambare, Paraguay	WTT	Clay	(Brazil) João Lucas Reis da Silva	6–1, 6–3
Win	6–7	Sep 2019	M15 Buenos Aires, Argentina	WTT	Clay	(Argentina) Maximiliano Estévez	6–4, 4–6, 6–1
Loss	6–8	Apr 2022	M25 Rosario, Argentina	WTT	Clay	(Argentina) Santiago Rodriguez Taverna	6–4, 3–6, 3–6
Win	7–8	Apr 2022	M25 Rosario, Argentina	WTT	Clay	(Argentina) Franco Emanuel Egea	3–6, 6–4, 6–1
Win	8–8	Dec 2023	M25 Concepción, Chile	WTT	Clay	(Argentina) Facundo Mena	6–3, 6–4
Loss	8–9	May 2025	M25 Coquimbo, Chile	WTT	Clay	(Brazil) Pedro Boscardin Dias	3–6, 1–6
Loss	8–10	Aug 2025	M25 Trelew, Argentina	WTT	Hard	(United States) Samir Banerjee	1–6, 2–6
Loss	8–11	May 2026	M25 Villa María, Argentina	WTT	Clay	(Argentina) Juan Bautista Torres	2–6, 5–7
Loss	8–12	Aug 2026	M15 Asunción, Paraguay	WTT	Clay	(Uruguay) Joaquín Aguilar Cardozo	3–6, 6–7^{(5–7)}
Loss	8–13	Aug 2026	M15 Asunción, Paraguay	WTT	Clay	(Uruguay) Joaquín Aguilar Cardozo	1–6, 3–6

=== Doubles: 14 (11 titles, 3 runner-ups) ===
Legend ATP Challenger Tour (7–3) ITF Futures/WTT (4–0)	Finals by surface Hard (1–0) Clay (10–3)

Result	W–L	Date	Tournament	Tier	Surface	Partner	Opponents	Score
Win	1–0	Apr 2024	Tucumán, Argentina	Challenger	Clay	(Brazil) Luís Britto	(Australia) Patrick Harper (United Kingdom) David Stevenson	6–3, 6–2
Win	2–0	Jan 2025	Tigre, Argentina	Challenger	Clay	(Argentina) Mariano Kestelboim	(Brazil) Luís Britto (Uruguay) Franco Roncadelli	6–2, 7–5
Win	3–0	Mar 2025	Campinas, Brazil	Challenger	Clay	(Argentina) Mariano Kestelboim	(Japan) Seita Watanabe (Japan) Takeru Yuzuki	6–2, 7–6^{(7–5)}
Loss	3–1	Apr 2025	Porto Alegre, Brazil	Challenger	Clay	(Argentina) Lautaro Midón	(Bolivia) Juan Carlos Prado Ángelo (Bolivia) Federico Zeballos	5–7, 5–7
Win	4–1	May 2025	Santos, Brazil	Challenger	Clay	(Brazil) Pedro Boscardin Dias	(Bolivia) Boris Arias (Bolivia) Federico Zeballos	6–2, 6–7^{(3–7)}, [10–7]
Win	5–1	Jun 2025	Santa Fe, Argentina	Challenger	Clay	(Argentina) Mariano Kestelboim	(Argentina) Santiago de la Fuente (Argentina) Genaro Alberto Olivieri	6–1, 2–6, [11–9]
Win	6–1	Jun 2025	Santa Cruz de la Sierra, Bolivia	Challenger	Clay	(Argentina) Mariano Kestelboim	(Bolivia) Boris Arias (Bolivia) Federico Zeballos	6–3, 6–2
Loss	6–2	Sep 2025	Villa María, Argentina	Challenger	Clay	(Brazil) Daniel Dutra da Silva	(Argentina) Guillermo Durán (Argentina) Mariano Kestelboim	4–6, 2–6
Loss	6–3	Feb 2026	Tigre, Argentina	Challenger	Clay	(Argentina) Santiago Rodríguez Taverna	(Argentina) Mariano Kestelboim (Bolivia) Juan Carlos Prado Ángelo	4–6, 7–5, [7–10]
Win	7–3	Nov 2026	Villa María, Argentina	Challenger	Clay	(Argentina) Facundo Bagnis	(Netherlands) Ryan Nijboer (Spain) Oriol Roca Batalla	walkover
Win	1–0	Sep 2014	ITF Buenos Aires, Argentina	Futures	Clay	(Argentina) Matías Franco Descotte	(Argentina) Juan Manuel Matute (Argentina) Mauricio Pérez Mota	4–6, 6–4, [10–1]
Win	2–0	Aug 2016	ITF Rosario, Argentina	Futures	Clay	(Slovenia) Tomás Lipovšek Puches	(Argentina) Maximiliano Estévez (Argentina) Valentín Florez	6–3, 6–7^{(5–7)}, [10–6]
Win	3–0	Jul 2019	ITF Gubbio, Italy	WTT	Hard	(Russia) Kirill Kivattsev	(Italy) Mattia Frinzi (Italy) Giorgio Portaluri	6–1, 6–4
Win	4–0	Mar 2021	ITF Villa Maria, Argentina	WTT	Clay	(Argentina) Mateo Nicolás Martínez	(Brazil) Matheus Pucinelli de Almeida (Brazil) João Lucas Reis da Silva	6–3, 6–3
