= Hernán Casanova =

Argentine tennis player

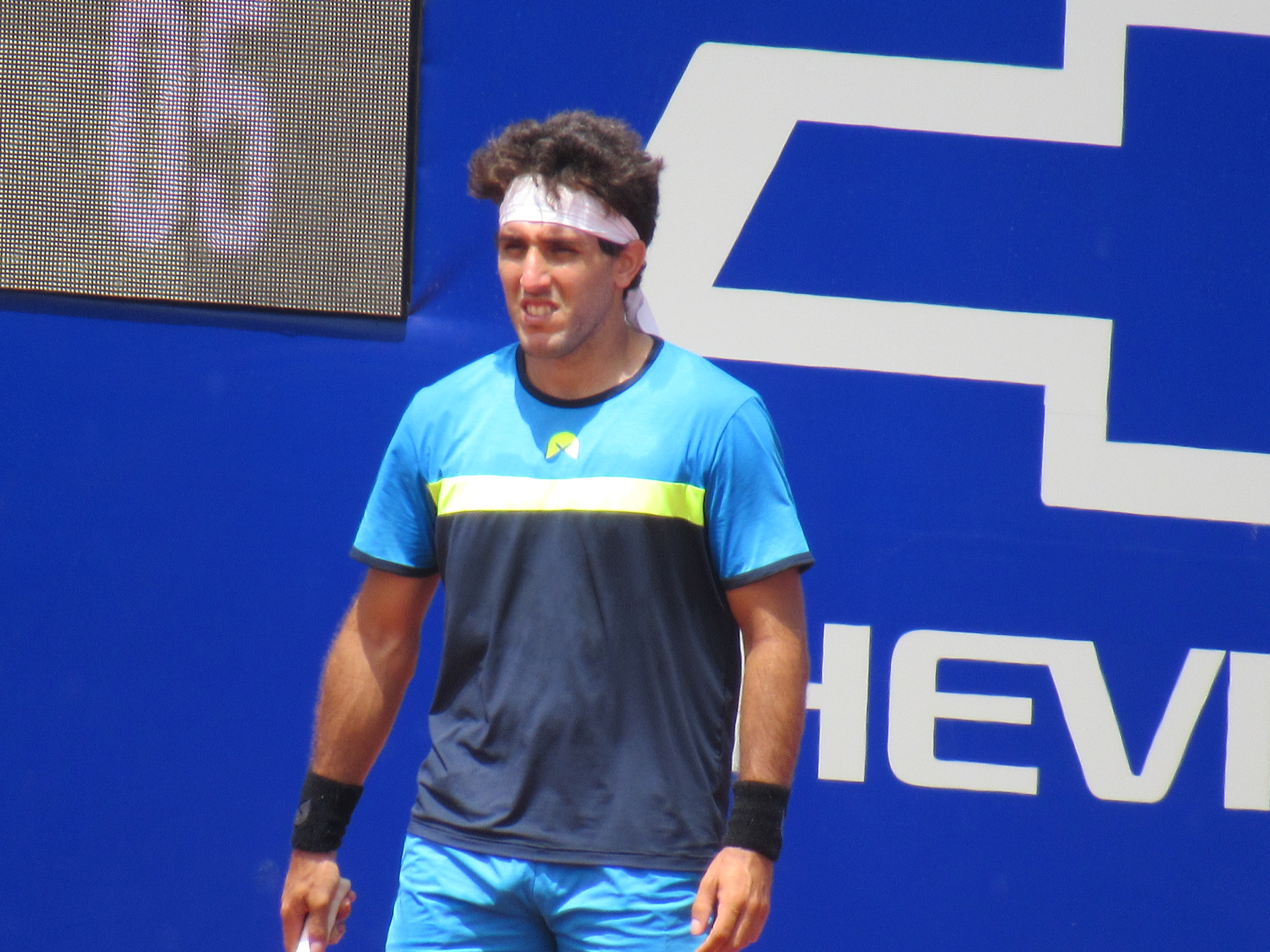
- Casanova in 2021
- Country (sports): Argentina
- Born: 6 February 1994 (age 32) Buenos Aires, Argentina
- Height: 1.78 m (5 ft 10 in)
- Plays: Right-handed (two-handed backhand)
- Coach: Jorge Bernard, Juan Martin Aranguren
- Prize money: US $360,215

Singles
- Career record: 0–1 (at ATP Tour level, Grand Slam level, and in Davis Cup)
- Career titles: 0
- Highest ranking: No. 221 (24 October 2022)
- Current ranking: No. 340 (10 August 2026)

Doubles
- Career record: 0–2 (at ATP Tour level, Grand Slam level, and in Davis Cup)
- Career titles: 0
- Highest ranking: No. 160 (24 October 2022)
- Current ranking: No. 309 (10 August 2026)
- Last updated on: 21 August 2026.

Hernán Casanova (born 6 February 1994) is an Argentine tennis player. Casanova had a career high ATP singles ranking of world No. 221 achieved on 24 October 2022 and a career high ATP doubles ranking of world No. 160 achieved on 24 October 2022.

Casanova made his ATP doubles main draw debut at the 2022 Argentina Open after entering into the main draw as alternates with Sergio Galdós.

Casanova also made his ATP singles main draw debut at the 2022 Generali Open Kitzbühel as a qualifier where he lost to Jurij Rodionov.

== Challenger and Futures finals ==
=== Singles: 43 (25 titles, 18 runner-ups) ===
Legend (singles) ATP Challengers (0–3) Futures (25–15)	Finals by surface Hard (0–0) Clay (25–18) Grass (0–0) Carpet (0–0)

Result	W–L	Date	Tournament	Tier	Surface	Opponent	Score
Loss	0–1	Jul 2012	Argentina F16, Arroyito	Futures	Clay	(Argentina) Leandro Migani	1–6, 1–6
Loss	0–2	May 2015	Argentina F4, Villa María	Futures	Clay	(Argentina) Franco Agamenone	3–6, 6–7^{(4–7)}
Win	2–1	Aug 2015	Argentina F8, Buenos Aires	Futures	Clay	(Argentina) Juan Ignacio Galarza	6–3, 6–1
Win	2–2	Aug 2015	Argentina F11, Buenos Aires	Futures	Clay	(Argentina) Maximiliano Estévez	6–4, 2–6, 6–2
Win	3–2	Nov 2015	Chile F8, Temuco	Futures	Clay	(Argentina) Patricio Heras	6–1, 1–6, 6–0
Win	4–2	Mar 2016	Argentina F2, Mendoza	Futures	Clay	(Argentina) Juan Ignacio Galarza	6–2, 6–1
Win	5–2	May 2016	Argentina F7, Córdoba	Futures	Clay	(Argentina) Andrea Collarini	4–6, 6–4, 6–4
Loss	5–3	Aug 2016	Romania F12, Iași	Futures	Clay	(Romania) Dragoș Dima	2–6, 0–3, ret.
Loss	5–4	Apr 2017	Tunisia F7, Hammamet	Futures	Clay	(Italy) Matteo Viola	4–6, 3–6
Win	6–4	Jun 2017	Argentina F2, Córdoba	Futures	Clay	(Argentina) Juan Ignacio Galarza	7–5, 6–2
Win	7–4	Jul 2017	Romania F7, Cluj-Napoca	Futures	Clay	(Italy) Alessandro Petrone	6–3, 6–4
Win	8–4	Aug 2017	Romania F8, Pitești	Futures	Clay	(Romania) Adrian Ungur	7–6^{(7–1)}, 6–3
Win	9–4	Aug 2017	Argentina F4, Rosario	Futures	Clay	(Brazil) Nicolas Santos	6–2, 6–2
Win	10–4	Sep 2017	Argentina F5, Neuquén	Futures	Clay	(Argentina) Facundo Argüello	3–6, 6–4, 6–1
Loss	10–5	Dec 2017	Argentina F11, Mendoza	Futures	Clay	(Uruguay) Martín Cuevas	4–6, 2–6
Loss	10–6	Apr 2018	Tunisia F12, Hammamet	Futures	Clay	(Argentina) Patricio Heras	2–6, 2–6
Win	11–6	Apr 2018	Italy F8, Pula	Futures	Clay	(Argentina) Andrea Collarini	7–6^{(7–5)}, 6–2
Win	12–6	Apr 2018	Italy F9, Pula	Futures	Clay	(Switzerland) Adrian Bodmer	6–3, 6–3
Win	13–6	Nov 2018	Argentina F7, Corrientes	Futures	Clay	(Argentina) Manuel Peña López	6–4, 7–5
Loss	13–7	Feb 2019	M15 Palmanova, Spain	World Tennis Tour	Clay	(Spain) Oriol Roca Batalla	6–7^{(7–9)}, 6–4, 1–6
Win	14–7	Mar 2019	M15 Pinamar, Argentina	World Tennis Tour	Clay	(Argentina) Tomás Martín Etcheverry	6–2, 6–2
Win	15–7	Mar 2019	M15 Pinamar, Argentina	World Tennis Tour	Clay	(Argentina) Juan Ignacio Galarza	6–7^{(2–7)}, 6–4, 6–1
Win	16–7	Aug 2019	M15 Chitila, Romania	World Tennis Tour	Clay	(Romania) Bogdan Ionut Apostol	6–4, 7–5
Loss	16–8	Aug 2019	M15 Târgu Mureș, Romania	World Tennis Tour	Clay	(Serbia) Marko Tepavac	6–7^{(1–7)}, 2–6
Loss	16–9	Aug 2019	M15 Curtea de Argeș, Romania	World Tennis Tour	Clay	(Romania) Alexandru Jecan	6–3, 6–7^{(4–7)}, 3–6
Win	17–9	Oct 2019	M15 Junín, Argentina	World Tennis Tour	Clay	(Argentina) Juan Manuel Cerúndolo	6–2, 6–1
Loss	17–10	Nov 2019	M15 Antalya, Turkey	World Tennis Tour	Clay	(Bulgaria) Dimitar Kuzmanov	4–6, 6–2, 1–6
Loss	17–11	May 2021	M15 Šibenik, Croatia	World Tennis Tour	Clay	(France) Timo Legout	4–6, 6–0, 2–6
Win	18–11	Jun 2021	M15 Sarajevo, Bosnia and Herzegovina	World Tennis Tour	Clay	(Brazil) Matheus Pucinelli de Almeida	6–2, 6–0
Win	19–11	Jul 2021	M25 Wrocław, Poland	World Tennis Tour	Clay	(Brazil) Orlando Luz	6–1, 6–3
Loss	19–12	Aug 2021	M25 Pitești, Romania	World Tennis Tour	Clay	(Chinese Taipei) Tseng Chun-hsin	3–6, 6–3, 0–6
Loss	19–13	Aug 2022	M25 Koksijde, Belgium	World Tennis Tour	Clay	(Belgium) Raphaël Collignon	1–6, 1–6
Win	20–13	Sep 2022	M25 Maribor, Slovenia	World Tennis Tour	Clay	(Bolivia) Murkel Dellien	6–4, 6–3
Win	21–13	Sep 2022	M25 Maribor, Slovenia	World Tennis Tour	Clay	(Switzerland) Damien Wenger	6–0, 7–5
Win	22–13	Oct 2022	M25 Río Cuarto, Argentina	World Tennis Tour	Clay	(Argentina) Guido Iván Justo	6–2, 6–3
Loss	22–14	Jul 2023	M25 Bacău, Romania	World Tennis Tour	Clay	(Romania) Marius Copil	3–6, 6–7^{(4–7)}
Loss	22–15	Apr 2024	San Miguel de Tucumán, Argentina	Challenger	Clay	(Argentina) Andrea Collarini	4–6, 6–7^{(3–7)}
Win	23–15	Nov 2024	M15 Luján, Argentina	World Tennis Tour	Clay	(Brazil) Gustavo Ribeiro de Almeida	6–3, 6–1
Win	24–15	Jan 2025	M15 Santiago, Chile	World Tennis Tour	Clay	(Argentina) Guido Iván Justo	6–2, 4–6. 6–4
Loss	24–16	Aug 2025	M25 Gentofte, Denmark	World Tennis Tour	Clay	(Greece) Aristotelis Thanos	6–4, 4–6. 3–6
Win	25–16	Oct 2025	M15 Santiago, Chile	World Tennis Tour	Clay	(Argentina) Juan Manuel La Serna	6–0, 0–6, 7–6^{(7–5)}
Loss	25–17	May 2026	Santos, Brazil	Challenger	Clay	(Uruguay) Franco Roncadelli	3–6, 2–6
Loss	25–18	Jun 2026	Quito, Ecuador	Challenger	Clay	(Brazil) Matheus Pucinelli De Almeida	7–5, 3–6, 2–6

=== Doubles: 41 (24 titles, 17 runner-ups) ===
Legend (doubles) ATP Challengers (5–4) Futures (19–13)	Finals by surface Hard (0–0) Clay (24–17) Grass (0–0) Carpet (0–0)

Result	W–L	Date	Tournament	Tier	Surface	Partner	Opponents	Score
Loss	0–1	Jul 2012	Argentina F16, Arroyito	Futures	Clay	(Argentina) Mariano Urli	(Argentina) Leandro Migani (Argentina) Benjamin Tenti	4–6, 4–6
Loss	0–2	May 2013	Argentina F5, Villa María	Futures	Clay	(Argentina) Juan Ignacio Galarza	(Argentina) Juan-Pablo Amado (Peru) Sergio Galdós	1–6, 2–6
Win	1–2	Aug 2014	Argentina F14, San Juan	Futures	Clay	(Argentina) Nicolás Kicker	(Argentina) Franco Capalbo (Argentina) Juan Pablo Ficovich	7–6^{(7–3)}, 6–4
Loss	1–3	Sep 2014	Argentina F18, Buenos Aires	Futures	Clay	(Argentina) Eduardo Agustín Torre	(Argentina) Juan Ignacio Galarza (Argentina) Juan Pablo Paz	6–7^{(4–7)}, 3–6
Loss	1–4	May 2015	Argentina F4, Villa María	Futures	Clay	(Argentina) Juan Ignacio Galarza	(Argentina) Alan Kohen (Chile) Ricardo Urzua-Rivera	6–7^{(5–7)}, 1–6
Win	2–4	May 2015	Argentina F6, Villa del Dique	Futures	Clay	(Argentina) Eduardo Agustin Torre	(Argentina) Juan Ignacio Galarza (Argentina) Mariano Kestelboim	6–7^{(8–6)}, 7–6^{(7–3)}, [10–7]
Loss	2–5	Aug 2015	Argentina F9, Chaco	Futures	Clay	(Argentina) Juan Pablo Ficovich	(Argentina) Franco Agamenone (Argentina) Patricio Heras	4–6, 0–6
Win	3–5	Sep 2015	Argentina F13, La Rioja	Futures	Clay	(Argentina) Eduardo Agustin Torre	(Argentina) Nicolás Alberto Arreche (Argentina) Gabriel Alejandro Hidalgo	6–3, 4–6, [10–8]
Loss	3–6	Mar 2016	Argentina F2, Mendoza	Futures	Clay	(Argentina) Eduardo Agustín Torre	(Argentina) Juan Ignacio Galarza (Argentina) Mateo Nicolás Martínez	4–6, 5–7
Loss	3–7	Mar 2017	Croatia F3, Umag	Futures	Clay	(Argentina) Juan Pablo Ficovich	(Czech Republic) Zdeněk Kolář (Croatia) Nino Serdarušić	5–7, 0–6
Win	4–7	Mar 2017	Spain F9, Madrid	Futures	Clay	(Bolivia) Federico Zeballos	(Spain) Álvaro López San Martín (United Kingdom) Alexander Ward	7–6^{(7–4)}, 6–1
Win	5–7	Apr 2017	Tunisia F15, Hammamet	Futures	Clay	(Argentina) Franco Agamenone	(France) Geoffrey Blancaneaux (France) Antoine Hoang	7–5, 1–6, [10–5]
Loss	5–8	Jun 2017	Argentina F1, Villa del Dique	Futures	Clay	(Argentina) Juan Ignacio Galarza	(Czech Republic) Facundo Argüello (Argentina) Tomás Lipovšek Puches	0–6, 1–6
Win	6–8	Nov 2017	Argentina F9, Santa Fe	Futures	Clay	(Argentina) Tomás Lipovšek Puches	(Argentina) Gerónimo Espín Busleiman (Argentina) Facundo Juárez	7–6^{(7–3)}, 1–6, [10–8]
Loss	6–9	Mar 2018	Tunisia F10, Hammamet	Futures	Clay	(Argentina) Eduardo Agustín Torre	(Peru) Alexander Merino (Germany) Christoph Negritu	3–6, 6–3, [5–10]
Win	7–9	Mar 2018	Tunisia F12, Hammamet	Futures	Clay	(Argentina) Tomás Lipovšek Puches	(Argentina) Mariano Kestelboim (Chile) Juan Carlos Sáez	1–6, 6–4, [10–2]
Win	8–9	May 2018	Romania F2, Bacău	Futures	Clay	(Argentina) Franco Agamenone	(Hungary) Gábor Borsos (Ecuador) Gonzalo Escobar	6–2, 6–3
Win	9–9	Jul 2018	Italy F21, Bolzano	Futures	Clay	(Ecuador) Gonzalo Escobar	(Brazil) Wilson Leite (Brazil) Bruno Sant'Anna	7–5, 6–2
Loss	9–10	Jan 2019	M15 Palmanova, Spain	World Tennis Tour	Clay	(Spain) Jaume Pla Malfeito	(Spain) Eduard Esteve Lobato (Spain) Pol Toledo Bagué	5–7, 7–5, [6–10]
Win	10–10	Feb 2019	M15 Antalya, Turkey	World Tennis Tour	Clay	(Argentina) Tomás Lipovšek Puches	(Romania) Bogdan Borza (Romania) Edris Fetisleam	6–4, 7–5
Loss	10–11	Feb 2019	M15 Antalya, Turkey	World Tennis Tour	Clay	(Argentina) Tomás Lipovšek Puches	(Italy) Riccardo Bellotti (Kazakhstan) Dmitry Popko	4–6, 6–7^{(3–7)}
Win	11–11	Mar 2019	M15 Pinamar, Argentina	World Tennis Tour	Clay	(Argentina) Francisco Cerúndolo	(Peru) Arklon Huertas del Pino (Peru) Conner Huertas del Pino	7–6^{(9–7)}, 3–6, [10–5]
Win	12–11	Mar 2019	M15 Pinamar, Argentina	World Tennis Tour	Clay	(Argentina) Franco Agamenone	(Argentina) Nicolás Alberto Arreche (Argentina) Manuel Peña López	7–5, 6–3
Win	13–11	Jul 2019	M25 Buenos Aires, Argentina	World Tennis Tour	Clay	(Argentina) Maximiliano Estévez	(Brazil) Mateus Alves (Chile) Matías Soto	6–3, 6–2
Win	14–11	Aug 2019	M15 Târgu Mureș, Romania	World Tennis Tour	Clay	(Argentina) Facundo Juárez	(Bulgaria) Gabriel Donev (United States) Maksim Tikhomirov	6–2, 7–6^{(7–4)}
Win	15–11	Jan 2021	M15 Cairo, Egypt	World Tennis Tour	Clay	(Italy) Franco Agamenone	(Japan) Ken Onishi (Japan) Jumpei Yamasaki	6–1, 6–4
Loss	15–12	May 2021	M15 Šibenik, Croatia	World Tennis Tour	Clay	(Argentina) Matías Zukas	(France) Dan Added (Austria) David Pichler	w/o
Loss	15–13	Jul 2021	Iași, Romania	Challenger	Clay	(Spain) Roberto Ortega Olmedo	(Brazil) Orlando Luz (Brazil) Felipe Meligeni Alves	3–6, 4–6
Loss	15–14	Oct 2021	Buenos Aires, Argentina	Challenger	Clay	(Argentina) Santiago Rodríguez Taverna	(Italy) Luciano Darderi (Argentina) Juan Bautista Torres	6–7^{(5–7)}, 6–7^{(10–12)}
Win	16–14	May 2022	Francavilla al Mare, Italy	Challenger	Clay	(France) Dan Added	(Italy) Davide Pozzi (Italy) Augusto Virgili	6–3, 7–5
Win	17–14	Aug 2022	M25 Koksijde, Belgium	World Tennis Tour	Clay	(Bolivia) Murkel Dellien	(Croatia) Zvonimir Babić (Sweden) Simon Freund	6–1, 4–6, [10–5]
Win	18–14	Sep 2022	Villa María, Argentina	Challenger	Clay	(Argentina) Santiago Rodríguez Taverna	(Argentina) Facundo Juárez (Argentina) Ignacio Monzón	6–4, 6–3
Win	19–14	Oct 2022	Coquimbo, Chile	Challenger	Clay	(Italy) Franco Agamenone	(Poland) Karol Drzewiecki (Switzerland) Jakub Paul	6–3, 6–4
Loss	19–15	Apr 2023	Buenos Aires, Argentina	Challenger	Clay	(Argentina) Santiago Rodríguez Taverna	(Argentina) Francisco Comesaña (Brazil) Thiago Seyboth Wild	3–6, 7–6^{(7–5)}, [6–10]
Win	20–15	Jul 2023	M25+H Bacău, Romania	World Tennis Tour	Clay	(Argentina) Juan Pablo Paz	(Romania) Marius Copil (Romania) Bogdan Pavel	7–6^{(7–4)}, 6–7^{(4–7)}, [10–8]
Loss	20–16	Mar 2024	M25 Tarragona, Spain	World Tennis Tour	Clay	(Switzerland) Damien Wenger	(Netherlands) Michiel de Krom (Netherlands) Ryan Nijboer	6–7^{(5–7)}, 4–6
Win	21–16	Feb 2025	M25 Punta del Este, Uruguay	World Tennis Tour	Clay	(Argentina) Santiago Rodríguez Taverna	(Argentina) Alex Barrena (Argentina) Renzo Olivo	7–5, 5–7, [10–1]
Win	22–16	Feb 2025	M25 Punta del Este, Uruguay	World Tennis Tour	Clay	(Argentina) Santiago Rodríguez Taverna	(Argentina) Valentín Basel (Argentina) Franco Ribero	6–1, 1–6, [10–5]
Win	23–16	Apr 2026	Santa Cruz, Bolivia	Challenger	Clay	(Argentina) Santiago Rodríguez Taverna	(Argentina) Mariano Kestelboim (Bolivia) Federico Zeballos	7–5, 6–4
Win	24–16	Jun 2026	San Miguel de Tucumán, Argentina	Challenger	Clay	(Argentina) Santiago Rodríguez Taverna	(Argentina) Mateo del Pino (United States) Ryan Dickerson	3–6, 6–3, [10–7]
Loss	24–17	Jun 2026	Quito, Ecuador	Challenger	Clay	(Brazil) Pedro Sakamoto	(Chile) Matías Soto (Bolivia) Federico Zeballos]	1–6, 4–6
