= Luciano Emanuel Ambrogi =

Argentine tennis player (born 2003)

- Country (sports): Argentina
- Born: 19 November 2003 (age 22) Rosario, Argentina
- Height: 1.88 m (6 ft 2 in)
- Plays: Right-handed (two-handed backhand)
- Coach: Alberto Mancini
- Prize money: US $139,006

Singles
- Career record: 0–0 (at ATP Tour level, Grand Slam level, and in Davis Cup)
- Career titles: 1 Challenger, 2 ITF
- Highest ranking: No. 311 (27 July 2026)
- Current ranking: No. 313 (3 August 2026)

Doubles
- Career record: 0–0 (at ATP Tour level, Grand Slam level, and in Davis Cup)
- Career titles: 4 ITF
- Highest ranking: No. 403 (3 August 2026)
- Current ranking: No. 403 (3 August 2026)
Medal record
Men's tennis
Representing Argentina
South American Games
Bronze medal – third place	2026 Santa Fe	Singles
Silver medal – second place	2026 Santa Fe	Mixed Doubles
- Last updated on: 3 October 2026.

Luciano Emanuel Ambrogi (born 19 November 2003) is an Argentine tennis player. Ambrogi has a career high ATP singles ranking of No. 311 achieved on 27 July 2026 and a career high ATP doubles ranking of No. 403 achieved on 3 August 2026.

Ambrogi has won one ATP Challenger singles title at the 2026 Challenger Tucumán.

== ATP Challenger Tour finals ==
=== Singles: 1 (1 titles, 0 runner-ups) ===
Legend ATP Challenger Tour (1–0)	Finals by surface Hard (–) Clay (1–0)

Result	W–L	Date	Tournament	Tier	Surface	Opponent	Score
Win	1–0	Jun 2026	Challenger de Tucumán, Argentina	Challenger	Clay	(Colombia) Johan Alexander Rodríguez	6–2, 6–3
