= Juan Manuel La Serna =

Argentine tennis player (born 2004)

- Country (sports): Argentina
- Born: 5 February 2004 (age 22) Catamarca, Argentina
- Height: 1.88 m (6 ft 2 in)
- Plays: Left-handed (two-handed backhand)
- Coach: Mauro Luciano Aprile
- Prize money: US $127,097

Singles
- Career record: 0–0 (at ATP Tour level, Grand Slam level, and in Davis Cup)
- Career titles: 2 ATP Challenger, 3 ITF
- Highest ranking: No. 216 (9 November 2026)
- Current ranking: No. 216 (9 November 2026)

Doubles
- Career record: 0–0 (at ATP Tour level, Grand Slam level, and in Davis Cup)
- Career titles: 10 ITF
- Highest ranking: No. 379 (9 December 2024)
- Current ranking: No. 424 (9 November 2026)
Medal record
Men's tennis
Representing Argentina
South American Games
Silver medal – second place	2026 Santa Fe	Singles
Silver medal – second place	2026 Santa Fe	Doubles
- Last updated on: 9 November 2026.

Juan Manuel La Serna (born 5 February 2004) is an Argentine tennis player. La Serna has a career high ATP singles ranking of No. 216 achieved on 9 November 2026 and a career high ATP doubles ranking of No. 379 achieved on 9 December 2024.

La Serna won his first ATP Challenger singles title at the 2026 Challenger Córdoba, defeating Franco Roncadelli in the final.

== ATP Challenger Tour finals ==
=== Singles: 2 (2 titles, 0 runner-ups) ===
Legend ATP Challenger Tour (2–0)	Finals by surface Hard (–) Clay (2–0)

Result	W–L	Date	Tournament	Tier	Surface	Opponent	Score
Win	1–0	May 2026	Challenger de Córdoba, Argentina	Challenger	Clay	(Uruguay) Franco Roncadelli	7–5, 2–6, 6–3
Win	2–0	Nov 2026	Challenger de Villa María, Argentina	Challenger	Clay	(Argentina) Genaro Alberto Olivieri	6–2, 6–3
