= 2023 Santa Cruz Challenger – Singles =

Singles
- 2023 Santa Cruz Challenger

Final
- Champion: (Argentina) Mariano Navone
- Runner-up: (Argentina) Francisco Comesaña
- Score: 4–6, 7–5, 6–1

Events
Singles	Doubles
← 2022 ·	Santa Cruz Challenger	· 2024 →

Paul Jubb was the defending champion but chose not to defend his title.

Mariano Navone won the title after defeating Francisco Comesaña 4–6, 7–5, 6–1 in the final.

== Seeds ==
1. (Argentina) Juan Manuel Cerúndolo (semifinals, retired)
2. (Argentina) Genaro Alberto Olivieri (quarterfinals)
3. (Bolivia) Hugo Dellien (first round)
4. (Argentina) Thiago Agustín Tirante (quarterfinals, retired)
5. (Argentina) Francisco Comesaña (final)
6. (Argentina) Mariano Navone (champion)
7. (Italy) Luciano Darderi (first round)
8. (Argentina) Camilo Ugo Carabelli (second round)

== Draw ==
=== Key ===
- Q = Qualifier
- WC = Wild card
- LL = Lucky loser
- Alt = Alternate
- ITF = ITF entry
- PR = Protected ranking
- SR = Special ranking
- SE = Special exempt
- JE = Junior exempt
- JR = Junior Accelerator Programme entrant
- CO = College Accelerator Programme entrant
- NG = Next Gen Accelerator Program entrant
- w/o = Walkover
- r = Retired
- d = Defaulted

=== Finals ===
Semifinals
1	(Argentina) Juan Manuel Cerúndolo	4	0^{r}
6	(Argentina) Mariano Navone	6	3
(Argentina) Andrea Collarini	7	4	4
5	(Argentina) Francisco Comesaña	5	6	6

Final
6	(Argentina) Mariano Navone	4	7	6
5	(Argentina) Francisco Comesaña	6	5	1

=== Top half ===
First round
1	(Argentina) JM Cerúndolo	6	6
(Argentina) A Barrena	2	3
Q	(Brazil) O Luz	7	6
(United States) B Kuzuhara	5	2
(United States) T Boyer	4	4
PR	(Brazil) P Sakamoto	6	6
(Brazil) JL Reis da Silva	6	6
7	(Italy) L Darderi	4	3
4	(Argentina) TA Tirante	2	6	2
(Brazil) D Dutra da Silva	6	3	0^{r}
(Brazil) M Pucinelli de Almeida	6	6
Q	(Brazil) M Zormann	4	4
WC	(Bolivia) JC Prado Ángelo	6	6
(Paraguay) AD Vallejo	3	1
WC	(Chile) M Soto	7	6^{4}	1
6	(Argentina) M Navone	5	7^{7}	6

Second round
1	(Argentina) JM Cerúndolo	7^{7}	4	7^{8}
Q	(Brazil) O Luz	6^{2}	6	6^{6}
PR	(Brazil) P Sakamoto	4	7^{7}	6
(Brazil) JL Reis da Silva	6	6^{4}	2
4	(Argentina) TA Tirante	7^{7}	7^{7}
(Brazil) M Pucinelli de Almeida	6^{1}	6^{3}
WC	(Bolivia) JC Prado Ángelo	3	3
6	(Argentina) M Navone	6	6

Quarterfinals
1	(Argentina) JM Cerúndolo	7	6
PR	(Brazil) P Sakamoto	5	4
4	(Argentina) TA Tirante	1	1^{r}
6	(Argentina) M Navone	6	4

Semifinals
1	(Argentina) JM Cerúndolo	4	0^{r}
6	(Argentina) M Navone	6	3

=== Bottom half ===
First round
8	(Argentina) C Ugo Carabelli	6	6
(Bolivia) M Dellien	2	4
Q	(Argentina) F Mena	6	6
Q	(Brazil) P Boscardin Dias	4	4
WC	(Argentina) JI Londero	7^{7}	6
(Argentina) R Olivo	6^{4}	2
(Argentina) A Collarini	7^{7}	6
3	(Bolivia) H Dellien	6^{4}	4
5	(Argentina) F Comesaña	6	6
(Brazil) E Ribeiro	2	4
(Spain) D Jordà Sanchis	0	6	5
(Brazil) G Heide	6	3	7
Q	(Argentina) G Villanueva	7^{7}	6
Q	(Brazil) J Pereira	6^{4}	2
(Argentina) RA Burruchaga	6	6^{3}	2
2	(Argentina) GA Olivieri	1	7^{7}	6

Second round
8	(Argentina) C Ugo Carabelli	4	5
Q	(Argentina) F Mena	6	7
WC	(Argentina) JI Londero
(Argentina) A Collarini	w/o
5	(Argentina) F Comesaña	6	7
(Brazil) G Heide	3	5
Q	(Argentina) G Villanueva	4	6	1
2	(Argentina) GA Olivieri	6	3	6

Quarterfinals
Q	(Argentina) F Mena	3	6^{6}
(Argentina) A Collarini	6	7^{8}
5	(Argentina) F Comesaña	6	6
2	(Argentina) GA Olivieri	4	1

Semifinals
(Argentina) A Collarini	7	4	4
5	(Argentina) F Comesaña	5	6	6
