= 2023 Santa Cruz Challenger – Doubles =

Doubles
- 2023 Santa Cruz Challenger

Final
- Champions: (Bolivia) Boris Arias (Bolivia) Federico Zeballos
- Runners-up: (Chile) Matías Soto (Argentina) Gonzalo Villanueva
- Score: 6–2, 4–6, [10–7]

Events
Singles	Doubles
← 2022 ·	Santa Cruz Challenger	· 2024 →

Jesper de Jong and Bart Stevens were the defending champions but chose not to defend their title.

Boris Arias and Federico Zeballos won the title after defeating Matías Soto and Gonzalo Villanueva 6–2, 4–6, [10–7] in the final.

== Seeds ==
1. (Bolivia) Boris Arias / (Bolivia) Federico Zeballos (champions)
2. (Brazil) Fernando Romboli / (Brazil) Marcelo Zormann (quarterfinals)
3. (Brazil) Orlando Luz / (Brazil) João Lucas Reis da Silva (semifinals)
4. (Brazil) Pedro Boscardin Dias / (Brazil) Gustavo Heide (semifinals, withdrew)

== Draw ==
Key

- Q = Qualifier
- WC = Wild card
- LL = Lucky loser
- Alt = Alternate
- ITF = ITF entry
- PR = Protected ranking
- SR = Special ranking
- SE = Special exempt
- JE = Junior exempt
- JR = Junior Accelerator Programme entrant
- CO = College Accelerator Programme entrant
- NG = Next Gen Accelerator Program entrant
- w/o = Walkover
- r = Retired
- d = Defaulted

First round
1	(Bolivia) B Arias (Bolivia) F Zeballos	6	6
(Argentina) A Barrena (Argentina) C Ugo Carabelli	3	0
(Bolivia) H Dellien (Bolivia) M Dellien	4	6	[10]
(Argentina) A Collarini (Argentina) R Olivo	6	2	[1]
3	(Brazil) O Luz (Brazil) JL Reis da Silva	7^{7}	6
Alt	(Colombia) JS Gómez (Peru) J Panta	6^{3}	2
(Brazil) M Alves (Brazil) E Ribeiro	6	6
(Italy) L Darderi (Argentina) M Navone	3	2
(Argentina) JM Cerúndolo (Argentina) TA Tirante	7^{7}	6
(Argentina) RA Burruchaga (Brazil) M Pucinelli de Almeida	6^{0}	3
WC	(Bolivia) JC Prado Ángelo (Paraguay) AD Vallejo	6	5	[3]
4	(Brazil) P Boscardin Dias (Brazil) G Heide	3	7	[10]
(United States) T Boyer (Argentina) GA Olivieri	3	1
(Chile) M Soto (Argentina) G Villanueva	6	6
WC	(Bolivia) Esteban Dávila (Argentina) F Mena	1	1
2	(Brazil) F Romboli (Brazil) M Zormann	6	6

Quarterfinals
1	(Bolivia) B Arias (Bolivia) F Zeballos	w/o
(Bolivia) H Dellien (Bolivia) M Dellien
3	(Brazil) O Luz (Brazil) JL Reis da Silva	6	7
(Brazil) M Alves (Brazil) E Ribeiro	3	5
(Argentina) JM Cerúndolo (Argentina) TA Tirante
4	(Brazil) P Boscardin Dias (Brazil) G Heide	w/o
(Chile) M Soto (Argentina) G Villanueva	6	3	[10]
2	(Brazil) F Romboli (Brazil) M Zormann	4	6	[6]

Semifinals
1	(Bolivia) B Arias (Bolivia) F Zeballos	6^{4}	6	[10]
3	(Brazil) O Luz (Brazil) JL Reis da Silva	7^{7}	3	[6]
4	(Brazil) P Boscardin Dias (Brazil) G Heide
(Chile) M Soto (Argentina) G Villanueva	w/o

Final
1	(Bolivia) B Arias (Bolivia) F Zeballos	6	4	[10]
(Chile) M Soto (Argentina) G Villanueva	2	6	[7]
