= 2024 Santa Cruz Challenger II – Doubles =

Doubles
- 2024 Santa Cruz Challenger II

Final
- Champions: (Lebanon) Hady Habib (United States) Trey Hilderbrand
- Runners-up: (New Zealand) Finn Reynolds (Chile) Matías Soto
- Score: 3–6, 6–3, [10–7]

Events
Singles	Doubles
← 2024 ·	Santa Cruz Challenger	· 2025 →

Andrea Collarini and Renzo Olivo were the defending champions but only Olivo chose to defend his title, partnering Tomás Farjat. They lost in the quarterfinals to Emile Hudd and David Stevenson.

Hady Habib and Trey Hilderbrand won the title after defeating Finn Reynolds and Matías Soto 3–6, 6–3, [10–7] in the final.

== Seeds ==
1. (Brazil) Luís Britto / (Argentina) Gonzalo Villanueva (first round)
2. (New Zealand) Finn Reynolds / (Chile) Matías Soto (final)
3. (United Kingdom) Emile Hudd / (United Kingdom) David Stevenson (semifinals)
4. (Japan) Seita Watanabe / (Japan) Takeru Yuzuki (semifinals)

== Draw ==
Key

- Q = Qualifier
- WC = Wild card
- LL = Lucky loser
- Alt = Alternate
- ITF = ITF entry
- PR = Protected ranking
- SR = Special ranking
- SE = Special exempt
- JE = Junior exempt
- JR = Junior Accelerator Programme entrant
- CO = College Accelerator Programme entrant
- NG = Next Gen Accelerator Program entrant
- w/o = Walkover
- r = Retired
- d = Defaulted

=== Draw ===
First round
1	(Brazil) L Britto (Argentina) G Villanueva	2	4
(Lebanon) H Habib (United States) T Hilderbrand	6	6
(Argentina) Leonardo Aboian (Argentina) V Aboian	6	6
WC	(Bolivia) Esteban Dávila (Bolivia) Raúl García	4	3
4	(Japan) S Watanabe (Japan) T Yuzuki	6	6
(Uruguay) I Carou (Bolivia) JC Prado Ángelo	2	1
(United States) G Johns (United States) N Schachter	7	7
(Ecuador) Á Guillén Meza (Argentina) AL Lingua Lavallén	5	5
(Argentina) Tomás Farjat (Argentina) R Olivo	4	6	[11]
Aleksandr Lobanov; Alexey Nesterov	6	1	[9]
(Colombia) JS Gómez (Colombia) A Urrea	4	0
3	(United Kingdom) Emile Hudd (United Kingdom) D Stevenson	6	6
(Brazil) M Pucinelli de Almeida (Brazil) Nicolas Zanellato	6	4	[8]
WC	(Bolivia) Iker Dellien (Bolivia) M Dellien	1	6	[10]
Alt	(Argentina) H Casanova (Argentina) Bautista Vilicich	1^{r}
2	(New Zealand) F Reynolds (Chile) M Soto	3

Quarterfinals
(Lebanon) H Habib (United States) T Hilderbrand	6	6
(Argentina) L Aboian (Argentina) V Aboian	2	2
4	(Japan) S Watanabe (Japan) T Yuzuki	6	6
(United States) G Johns (United States) N Schachter	4	2
(Argentina) T Farjat (Argentina) R Olivo	3	4
3	(United Kingdom) E Hudd (United Kingdom) D Stevenson	6	6
WC	(Bolivia) I Dellien (Bolivia) M Dellien
2	(New Zealand) F Reynolds (Chile) M Soto	w/o

Semifinals
(Lebanon) H Habib (United States) T Hilderbrand	4	7^{7}	[11]
4	(Japan) S Watanabe (Japan) T Yuzuki	6	6^{3}	[9]
3	(United Kingdom) E Hudd (United Kingdom) D Stevenson	6^{3}	3
2	(New Zealand) F Reynolds (Chile) M Soto	7^{7}	6

Final
(Lebanon) H Habib (United States) T Hilderbrand	3	6	[10]
2	(New Zealand) F Reynolds (Chile) M Soto	6	3	[7]
