= 2024 Santa Cruz Challenger II – Singles =

Singles
- 2024 Santa Cruz Challenger II

Final
- Champion: (Argentina) Juan Manuel Cerúndolo
- Runner-up: (Ecuador) Álvaro Guillén Meza
- Score: 3–6, 6–1, 6–4

Events
Singles	Doubles
- Santa Cruz Challenger

Camilo Ugo Carabelli was the defending champion but chose not to defend his title.

Juan Manuel Cerúndolo won the title after defeating Álvaro Guillén Meza 3–6, 6–1, 6–4 in the final.

== Seeds ==
1. (Argentina) Juan Manuel Cerúndolo (champion)
2. (Bolivia) Murkel Dellien (second round)
3. (Argentina) Andrea Collarini (second round, retired)
4. (Lebanon) Hady Habib (semifinals)
5. (Ecuador) Álvaro Guillén Meza (final)
6. (Brazil) Pedro Sakamoto (quarterfinals)
7. (Argentina) Renzo Olivo (second round)
8. (Argentina) Facundo Mena (semifinals)

== Draw ==
Key

- Q = Qualifier
- WC = Wild card
- LL = Lucky loser
- Alt = Alternate
- ITF = ITF entry
- PR = Protected ranking
- SR = Special ranking
- SE = Special exempt
- JE = Junior exempt
- JR = Junior Accelerator Programme entrant
- CO = College Accelerator Programme entrant
- NG = Next Gen Accelerator Program entrant
- w/o = Walkover
- r = Retired
- d = Defaulted

=== Finals ===
Semifinals
1	(Argentina) Juan Manuel Cerúndolo	7^{7}	6
4	(Lebanon) Hady Habib	6^{4}	4
8	(Argentina) Facundo Mena	6	3	3
5	(Ecuador) Álvaro Guillén Meza	3	6	6

Final
1	(Argentina) Juan Manuel Cerúndolo	3	6	6
5	(Ecuador) Álvaro Guillén Meza	6	1	4

=== Top half ===
First round
1	(Argentina) JM Cerúndolo	1	6	7
(Argentina) L Midón	6	1	5
SE	(Brazil) P Boscardin Dias	4	2
Q	(Brazil) J Pereira	6	6
(Argentina) H Casanova	6	6
(Brazil) JL Reis da Silva	2	2
(Argentina) V Aboian	6^{5}	7^{8}	4
6	(Brazil) P Sakamoto	7^{7}	6^{6}	6
4	(Lebanon) H Habib	6	7^{7}
(Brazil) M Pucinelli de Almeida	3	6^{4}
Q	(United States) N Schachter	6	3	3
(Chile) M Soto	3	6	6
Q	(United States) Dali Blanch	6	4	3
(Bolivia) JC Prado Ángelo	4	6	6
WC	(Bolivia) Agustín Eduardo Cuéllar Lorberg	2	2
7	(Argentina) R Olivo	6	6

Second round
1	(Argentina) JM Cerúndolo	6	7
Q	(Brazil) J Pereira	4	5
(Argentina) H Casanova	3	7^{7}	6^{3}
6	(Brazil) P Sakamoto	6	6^{3}	7^{7}
4	(Lebanon) H Habib	7^{7}	7
(Chile) M Soto	6^{2}	5
(Bolivia) JC Prado Ángelo	6	3	6
7	(Argentina) R Olivo	2	6	3

Quarterfinals
1	(Argentina) JM Cerúndolo	6	6
6	(Brazil) P Sakamoto	4	3
4	(Lebanon) H Habib	7^{7}	4	7
(Bolivia) JC Prado Ángelo	6^{3}	6	5

Semifinals
1	(Argentina) JM Cerúndolo	7^{7}	6
4	(Lebanon) H Habib	6^{4}	4

=== Bottom half ===
First round
8	(Argentina) F Mena	7^{8}	6
Alt	(Brazil) Nicolas Zanellato	6^{6}	1
(Argentina) G Villanueva	4	2
(Argentina) AL Lingua Lavallén	6	6
LL	(United States) U Blanch	6^{5}	4
Q	(Argentina) Leonardo Aboian	7^{7}	6
WC	(Ecuador) E Gómez	2	5
3	(Argentina) A Collarini	6	7
5	(Ecuador) Á Guillén Meza	7^{7}	6
Alt	(Colombia) A Soriano Barrera	6^{5}	3
Q	(Argentina) GI Justo	5	1
(Argentina) JB Torres	7	6
WC	(Bolivia) Raúl García	4	1
(United States) G Johns	6	6
Q	(Spain) Diego Augusto Barreto Sánchez	1	0
2	(Bolivia) M Dellien	6	6

Second round
8	(Argentina) F Mena	6	7
(Argentina) AL Lingua Lavallén	2	5
Q	(Argentina) L Aboian	6	1
3	(Argentina) A Collarini	3	2^{r}
5	(Ecuador) Á Guillén Meza	7	6^{2}	6
(Argentina) JB Torres	5	7^{7}	1
(United States) G Johns	0	6	7^{7}
2	(Bolivia) M Dellien	6	4	6^{4}

Quarterfinals
8	(Argentina) F Mena	6	6
Q	(Argentina) L Aboian	3	2
5	(Ecuador) Á Guillén Meza	6	4	6
(United States) G Johns	2	6	3

Semifinals
8	(Argentina) F Mena	6	3	3
5	(Ecuador) Á Guillén Meza	3	6	6
