= 2026 Santa Cruz Challenger – Singles =

Singles
- 2026 Santa Cruz Challenger

Final
- Champion: (Bolivia) Hugo Dellien
- Runner-up: (Bolivia) Juan Carlos Prado Ángelo
- Score: 6–4, 7–5

Events
Singles	Doubles
- Santa Cruz Challenger

Alex Barrena was the defending champion but chose not to defend his title.

Hugo Dellien won the title after defeating Juan Carlos Prado Ángelo 6–4, 7–5 in the final.

== Seeds ==
1. (Bolivia) Hugo Dellien (champion)
2. (Bolivia) Juan Carlos Prado Ángelo (final)
3. (Peru) Gonzalo Bueno (quarterfinals, retired)
4. (Argentina) Lautaro Midón (withdrew)
5. (Argentina) Santiago Rodríguez Taverna (quarterfinals)
6. (Brazil) Thiago Seyboth Wild (quarterfinals)
7. (Argentina) Guido Iván Justo (second round)
8. (Uruguay) Franco Roncadelli (first round)
9. (Peru) Juan Pablo Varillas (first round, retired)

== Draw ==
Key

- Q = Qualifier
- WC = Wild card
- LL = Lucky loser
- Alt = Alternate
- ITF = ITF entry
- PR = Protected ranking
- SR = Special ranking
- SE = Special exempt
- JE = Junior exempt
- JR = Junior Accelerator Programme entrant
- CO = College Accelerator Programme entrant
- NG = Next Gen Accelerator Program entrant
- w/o = Walkover
- r = Retired
- d = Defaulted

=== Finals ===
Semifinals
1	(Bolivia) Hugo Dellien	6	6
(Argentina) Valerio Aboian	1	4
(Chile) Matías Soto	2	5
2	(Bolivia) Juan Carlos Prado Ángelo	6	7

Final
1	(Bolivia) Hugo Dellien	6	7
2	(Bolivia) Juan Carlos Prado Ángelo	4	5

=== Top half ===
First round
1	(Bolivia) H Dellien	6	6
Q	(Argentina) Máximo Zeitune	4	4
(Argentina) Juan Estévez	3	6	6
(Argentina) JM La Serna	6	3	3
Q	(Argentina) S de la Fuente	4	5
Q	(Chile) Nicolás Villalón	6	7
Alt	(Ukraine) Eric Vanshelboim	7^{9}	4	4
5	(Argentina) S Rodríguez Taverna	6^{7}	6	6
9	(Peru) JP Varillas	5	1^{r}
(Argentina) F Mena	7	3
(Argentina) V Aboian	6	6
Q	(Argentina) Thiago Cigarrán	2	0
Q	(Argentina) F Ribero	0	7^{7}	3
WC	(Brazil) G Miguel	6	6^{4}	6
Q	(Colombia) Samuel Alejandro Linde Palacios	2	1
6/WC	(Brazil) T Seyboth Wild	6	6

Second round
1	(Bolivia) H Dellien	6	6
(Argentina) J Estévez	4	3
Q	(Chile) N Villalón	6^{5}	6	6^{4}
5	(Argentina) S Rodríguez Taverna	7^{7}	3	7^{7}
(Argentina) F Mena	5	4
(Argentina) V Aboian	7	6
WC	(Brazil) G Miguel	0	3
6/WC	(Brazil) T Seyboth Wild	6	6

Quarterfinals
1	(Bolivia) H Dellien	3	6	6
5	(Argentina) S Rodríguez Taverna	6	4	1
(Argentina) V Aboian	6	2	6
6/WC	(Brazil) T Seyboth Wild	4	6	4

Semifinals
1	(Bolivia) H Dellien	6	6
(Argentina) V Aboian	1	4

=== Bottom half ===
First round
7	(Argentina) GI Justo	6	3	7
(Argentina) LE Ambrogi	4	6	5
(Argentina) M Kestelboim	5	1
(Chile) M Soto	7	6
Alt	(Argentina) Lorenzo Joaquín Rodríguez	1	6	3
WC	(Argentina) F Coria	6	4	6
(Argentina) G Villanueva	4	7	4
3	(Peru) G Bueno	6	5	6
8	(Uruguay) F Roncadelli	4	6	3
(Brazil) P Sakamoto	6	1	6
(Argentina) H Casanova	2	3
(Argentina) JB Torres	6	6
LL	(United States) Ryan Dickerson	6	6
Alt	(Argentina) Carlos María Zárate	4	4
(Bolivia) M Dellien	3	3
2	(Bolivia) JC Prado Ángelo	6	6

Second round
7	(Argentina) GI Justo	2	3
(Chile) M Soto	6	6
WC	(Argentina) F Coria	4	1
3	(Peru) G Bueno	6	6
(Brazil) P Sakamoto	7^{7}	2	0
(Argentina) JB Torres	6^{4}	6	6
LL	(United States) R Dickerson	7	5	4
2	(Bolivia) JC Prado Ángelo	5	7	6

Quarterfinals
(Chile) M Soto	6	2
3	(Peru) G Bueno	0	0^{r}
(Argentina) JB Torres	4	5
2	(Bolivia) JC Prado Ángelo	6	7

Semifinals
(Chile) M Soto	2	5
2	(Bolivia) JC Prado Ángelo	6	7
