= 2022 Santa Cruz Challenger – Doubles =

Doubles
- 2022 Santa Cruz Challenger

Final
- Champions: (Ecuador) Diego Hidalgo (Colombia) Cristian Rodríguez
- Runners-up: (Slovakia) Andrej Martin (Austria) Tristan-Samuel Weissborn
- Score: 4–6, 6–3, [10–8]

Events
Singles	Doubles
Santa Cruz Challenger	· 2022 →

This was the first edition of the tournament as part of the Legión Sudamericana.

Diego Hidalgo and Cristian Rodríguez won the title after defeating Andrej Martin and Tristan-Samuel Weissborn 4–6, 6–3, [10–8] in the final.

== Seeds ==
1. (Brazil) Orlando Luz / (Brazil) Rafael Matos (semifinals)
2. (Argentina) Guillermo Durán / (Venezuela) Luis David Martínez (quarterfinals)
3. (Slovakia) Andrej Martin / (Austria) Tristan-Samuel Weissborn (final)
4. (Ecuador) Diego Hidalgo / (Colombia) Cristian Rodríguez (champions)

== Draw ==
=== Key ===
- Q = Qualifier
- WC = Wild card
- LL = Lucky loser
- Alt = Alternate
- SE = Special exempt
- PR = Protected ranking
- ITF = ITF entry
- JE = Junior exempt
- w/o = Walkover
- r = Retired
- d = Defaulted
- SR = Special ranking

First round
WC	(Bolivia) M Dellien (Argentina) GA Olivieri	6	6
WC	(Bolivia) A Mendoza (Bolivia) JC Prado Ángelo	3	4
(Argentina) MF Descotte (Argentina) G Villanueva	w/o
(Spain) C Gómez-Herrera (Argentina) F Mena
(Brazil) D Dutra da Silva (Brazil) P Sakamoto
(Uruguay) I Carou (Argentina) C Ugo Carabelli	w/o
(Bolivia) B Arias (Bolivia) F Zeballos	6^{2}	7^{9}	[6]
4	(Ecuador) D Hidalgo (Colombia) C Rodríguez	7^{7}	6^{7}	[10]
(Peru) S Galdós (Peru) A Merino	6^{5}	1
(Argentina) F Comesaña (Argentina) F Díaz Acosta	7^{7}	6

Quarterfinals
1	(Brazil) O Luz (Brazil) R Matos	6	6
WC	(Bolivia) M Dellien (Argentina) GA Olivieri	4	2
3	(Slovakia) A Martin (Austria) T-S Weissborn	6	6
(Argentina) MF Descotte (Argentina) G Villanueva	3	3
(Uruguay) I Carou (Argentina) C Ugo Carabelli	2	2
4	(Ecuador) D Hidalgo (Colombia) C Rodríguez	6	6
(Argentina) F Comesaña (Argentina) F Díaz Acosta	6	7
2	(Argentina) G Durán (Venezuela) LD Martínez	3	5

Semifinals
1	(Brazil) O Luz (Brazil) R Matos	1	6	[3]
3	(Slovakia) A Martin (Austria) T-S Weissborn	6	3	[10]
4	(Ecuador) D Hidalgo (Colombia) C Rodríguez	3	6	[11]
(Argentina) F Comesaña (Argentina) F Díaz Acosta	6	3	[9]

Final
3	(Slovakia) A Martin (Austria) T-S Weissborn	6	3	[8]
4	(Ecuador) D Hidalgo (Colombia) C Rodríguez	4	6	[10]
