= 2025 Santa Cruz Challenger – Singles =

Singles
- 2025 Santa Cruz Challenger

Final
- Champion: (Argentina) Alex Barrena
- Runner-up: (Uruguay) Franco Roncadelli
- Score: 5–7, 7–5, 6–3

Events
Singles	Doubles
- Santa Cruz Challenger

Juan Manuel Cerúndolo was the defending champion but chose not to defend his title.

Alex Barrena won the title after defeating Franco Roncadelli 5–7, 7–5, 6–3 in the final.

== Seeds ==
1. (Bolivia) Murkel Dellien (first round)
2. (Brazil) Matheus Pucinelli de Almeida (withdrew)
3. (Argentina) Juan Bautista Torres (second round)
4. (Argentina) Genaro Alberto Olivieri (second round, retired)
5. (Argentina) Renzo Olivo (first round, retired)
6. (Bolivia) Juan Carlos Prado Ángelo (second round)
7. (Argentina) Lautaro Midón (quarterfinals)
8. (Brazil) João Lucas Reis da Silva (semifinals)

== Draw ==
Key

- Q = Qualifier
- WC = Wild card
- LL = Lucky loser
- Alt = Alternate
- ITF = ITF entry
- PR = Protected ranking
- SR = Special ranking
- SE = Special exempt
- JE = Junior exempt
- JR = Junior Accelerator Programme entrant
- CO = College Accelerator Programme entrant
- NG = Next Gen Accelerator Program entrant
- w/o = Walkover
- r = Retired
- d = Defaulted

=== Finals ===
Semifinals
(Uruguay) Franco Roncadelli	7^{7}	4	6
8	(Brazil) João Lucas Reis da Silva	6^{3}	6	4
(Argentina) Alex Barrena	6	6
LL	(Argentina) Juan Manuel La Serna	3	0

Final
(Uruguay) Franco Roncadelli	7	5	3
(Argentina) Alex Barrena	5	7	6

=== Top half ===
First round
1	(Bolivia) M Dellien	6^{2}	2
(Brazil) P Boscardin Dias	7^{7}	6
(Argentina) M Kestelboim	6	4	4
(Argentina) G Villanueva	3	6	6
(Uruguay) F Roncadelli	6	6
Alt	(Argentina) Tomás Farjat	4	4
(Peru) G Bueno	7^{8}	3	3
6	(Bolivia) JC Prado Ángelo	6^{6}	6	6
4	(Argentina) GA Olivieri	6	6
Q	(Germany) John Sperle	0	3
Q	(Germany) Lucas Gerch	6	6^{4}	7^{7}
(Argentina) GI Justo	3	7^{7}	6^{4}
Q	(Spain) Diego Augusto Barreto Sánchez	6	3	4
(Argentina) LE Ambrogi	3	6	6
(Thailand) M Jones	6^{4}	3
8	(Brazil) JL Reis da Silva	7^{7}	6

Second round
(Brazil) P Boscardin Dias	6	3	4
(Argentina) G Villanueva	2	6	6
(Uruguay) F Roncadelli	6	6^{4}	6
6	(Bolivia) JC Prado Ángelo	4	7^{7}	4
4	(Argentina) GA Olivieri	1^{r}
Q	(Germany) L Gerch	4
(Argentina) LE Ambrogi	4	2
8	(Brazil) JL Reis da Silva	6	6

Quarterfinals
(Argentina) G Villanueva	7^{7}	2	4
(Uruguay) F Roncadelli	6^{3}	6	6
Q	(Germany) L Gerch	6	2	2
8	(Brazil) JL Reis da Silva	3	6	6

Semifinals
(Uruguay) F Roncadelli	7^{7}	4	6
8	(Brazil) JL Reis da Silva	6^{3}	6	4

=== Bottom half ===
First round
5	(Argentina) R Olivo	4	1^{r}
Q	(Mexico) LC Álvarez	6	5
Q	(Argentina) Bautista Vilicich	6	6
(Argentina) N Kicker	4	2
WC	(Bolivia) F Zeballos	1	4
(Argentina) A Barrena	6	6
WC	(Bolivia) Raúl García	2	1
3	(Argentina) JB Torres	6	6
7	(Argentina) L Midón	1	6	6
(Canada) Alvin Nicholas Tudorica	6	3	2
Q	(Argentina) S de la Fuente	6^{2}	7	3
(Canada) JC Aguilar	7^{7}	5	6
(Mexico) A Hernández	6	6
(Argentina) H Casanova	3	1
WC	(Argentina) F Bagnis	2	4
LL	(Argentina) JM La Serna	6	6

Second round
Q	(Mexico) LC Álvarez	5	6^{3}
Q	(Argentina) B Vilicich	7	7^{7}
(Argentina) A Barrena	6	6
3	(Argentina) JB Torres	1	1
7	(Argentina) L Midón	6	6
(Canada) JC Aguilar	4	4
(Mexico) A Hernández	1	4
LL	(Argentina) JM La Serna	6	6

Quarterfinals
Q	(Argentina) B Vilicich	2	1
(Argentina) A Barrena	6	6
7	(Argentina) L Midón	2	6	5
LL	(Argentina) JM La Serna	6	4	7

Semifinals
(Argentina) A Barrena	6	6
LL	(Argentina) JM La Serna	3	0
