= 2026 Santa Cruz Challenger II – Singles =

Singles
- 2026 Santa Cruz Challenger II

Final
- Champion: (Brazil) Thiago Seyboth Wild
- Runner-up: (Bolivia) Hugo Dellien
- Score: 6–4, 6–3

Events
Singles	Doubles
- Santa Cruz Challenger

Hugo Dellien was the defending champion but lost in the final to Thiago Seyboth Wild.

Seyboth Wild won the title after defeating Dellien 6–4, 6–3 in the final.

== Seeds ==
1. (Argentina) Francisco Comesaña (semifinals)
2. (Bolivia) Hugo Dellien (final)
3. (Brazil) Thiago Seyboth Wild (champion)
4. (Bolivia) Juan Carlos Prado Ángelo (second round)
5. (Peru) Gonzalo Bueno (first round)
6. (Argentina) Guido Iván Justo (second round, retired)
7. (Argentina) Facundo Mena (second round)
8. (Argentina) Alex Barrena (second round)

== Draw ==
Key

- Q = Qualifier
- WC = Wild card
- LL = Lucky loser
- Alt = Alternate
- ITF = ITF entry
- PR = Protected ranking
- SR = Special ranking
- SE = Special exempt
- JE = Junior exempt
- JR = Junior Accelerator Programme entrant
- CO = College Accelerator Programme entrant
- NG = Next Gen Accelerator Program entrant
- w/o = Walkover
- r = Retired
- d = Defaulted

=== Finals ===
Semifinals
1	(Argentina) Francisco Comesaña	6^{0}	6	6^{3}
3	(Brazil) Thiago Seyboth Wild	7^{7}	4	7^{7}
(Argentina) Juan Manuel La Serna	4	3
2	(Bolivia) Hugo Dellien	6	6

Final
3	(Brazil) Thiago Seyboth Wild	6	6
2	(Bolivia) Hugo Dellien	4	3

=== Top half ===
First round
1	(Argentina) F Comesaña	6	4	6
(Dominican Republic) N Hardt	3	6	2
Alt	(Uruguay) J Aguilar Cardozo	0	1^{r}
PR	(Brazil) F Meligeni Alves	6	2
(Argentina) GA Olivieri	6	4	6
Q	(Argentina) Lucio Ratti	4	6	2
(Argentina) JB Torres	6^{4}	0
8	(Argentina) A Barrena	7^{7}	6
3	(Brazil) T Seyboth Wild	6	7^{7}
Q	(Brazil) M Alves	3	6^{3}
(Argentina) G Villanueva	3	7	4
Alt	(Argentina) Carlos María Zárate	6	5	6
Q	(Argentina) Thiago Cigarrán	3	2
(Argentina) N Kicker	6	6
(Brazil) P Boscardin Dias	5	4
7	(Argentina) F Mena	7	6

Second round
1	(Argentina) F Comesaña	6	6
PR	(Brazil) F Meligeni Alves	1	4
(Argentina) GA Olivieri	3	6	6
8	(Argentina) A Barrena	6	3	4
3	(Brazil) T Seyboth Wild	6	6
Alt	(Argentina) CM Zárate	2	2
(Argentina) N Kicker	7^{7}	6
7	(Argentina) F Mena	6^{4}	4

Quarterfinals
1	(Argentina) F Comesaña	3	6	6
(Argentina) GA Olivieri	6	3	3
3	(Brazil) T Seyboth Wild	6	6
(Argentina) N Kicker	1	1

Semifinals
1	(Argentina) F Comesaña	6^{0}	6	6^{3}
3	(Brazil) T Seyboth Wild	7^{7}	4	7^{7}

=== Bottom half ===
First round
6	(Argentina) GI Justo	6	2	6
Q	(Peru) A Huertas del Pino	1	6	0
Q	(Argentina) H Casanova	3	4
(Argentina) JM La Serna	6	6
Alt	(Argentina) V Aboian	7	0	3
(Uruguay) F Roncadelli	5	6	6
Alt	(Brazil) E Ribeiro	4	4
4	(Bolivia) JC Prado Ángelo	6	6
5	(Peru) G Bueno	1	3
Q	(Argentina) Máximo Zeitune	6	6
WC	(Brazil) G Miguel	6	1
WC	(Bolivia) M Dellien	0	0^{r}
(Mexico) R Pacheco Méndez	6	4	6
Alt	(Argentina) Juan Estévez	3	6	3
WC	(Spain) Bernardo Munk Mesa	3	5
2	(Bolivia) H Dellien	6	7

Second round
6	(Argentina) GI Justo	1	0^{r}
(Argentina) JM La Serna	6	0
(Uruguay) F Roncadelli	6	2	6
4	(Bolivia) JC Prado Ángelo	4	6	3
Q	(Argentina) M Zeitune	2	4
WC	(Brazil) G Miguel	6	6
(Mexico) R Pacheco Méndez	3	5
2	(Bolivia) H Dellien	6	7

Quarterfinals
(Argentina) JM La Serna	6	6^{4}	6
(Uruguay) F Roncadelli	1	7^{7}	4
WC	(Brazil) G Miguel	2	4
2	(Bolivia) H Dellien	6	6

Semifinals
(Argentina) JM La Serna	4	3
2	(Bolivia) H Dellien	6	6
