= 2022 Santa Cruz Challenger – Singles =

Singles
- 2022 Santa Cruz Challenger

Final
- Champion: (Argentina) Francisco Cerúndolo
- Runner-up: (Argentina) Camilo Ugo Carabelli
- Score: 6–4, 6–3

Events
Singles	Doubles
Santa Cruz Challenger	· 2022 →

This was the first edition of the tournament as part of the Legión Sudamericana.

Francisco Cerúndolo won the title after defeating Camilo Ugo Carabelli 6–4, 6–3 in the final.

== Seeds ==
1. (Bolivia) Hugo Dellien (semifinals)
2. (Slovakia) Andrej Martin (first round)
3. (Argentina) Francisco Cerúndolo (champion)
4. (Argentina) Tomás Martín Etcheverry (first round, retired)
5. (Czech Republic) Zdeněk Kolář (second round)
6. (Spain) Fernando Verdasco (quarterfinals)
7. (Argentina) Facundo Mena (second round)
8. (Argentina) Camilo Ugo Carabelli (final)

== Draw ==
=== Key ===
- Q = Qualifier
- WC = Wild card
- LL = Lucky loser
- Alt = Alternate
- SE = Special exempt
- PR = Protected ranking
- ITF = ITF entry
- JE = Junior exempt
- w/o = Walkover
- r = Retired
- d = Defaulted
- SR = Special ranking

=== Finals ===
Semifinals
1	(Bolivia) Hugo Dellien	6	4	3
3	(Argentina) Francisco Cerúndolo	1	6	6
8	(Argentina) Camilo Ugo Carabelli	6	6
Q	(Argentina) Pedro Cachin	3	2

Final
3	(Argentina) Francisco Cerúndolo	6	6
8	(Argentina) Camilo Ugo Carabelli	4	3

=== Top half ===
First round
1	(Bolivia) H Dellien	7	7
(Argentina) S Rodríguez Taverna	5	5
Q	(Argentina) MF Descotte	7^{7}	2	2
(Brazil) D Dutra da Silva	6^{3}	6	6
Q	(Ecuador) D Hidalgo	3	5
Alt	(Peru) N Álvarez	6	7
Q	(Argentina) G Villanueva	5	6	2
5	(Czech Republic) Z Kolář	7	4	6
3	(Argentina) F Cerúndolo	7^{7}	2	6
(Argentina) F Díaz Acosta	6^{4}	6	3
Q	(Bolivia) JC Prado Ángelo	4	4
(Argentina) TA Tirante	6	6
WC	(Bolivia) F Zeballos	5	2
(United States) N Moreno de Alboran	7	6
(Argentina) GA Olivieri	1	1
7	(Argentina) F Mena	6	6

Second round
1	(Bolivia) H Dellien	6^{4}	7^{7}	6
(Brazil) D Dutra da Silva	7^{7}	6^{3}	3
Alt	(Peru) N Álvarez	6^{4}	6	6
5	(Czech Republic) Z Kolář	7^{7}	3	4
3	(Argentina) F Cerúndolo	6	3	7^{7}
(Argentina) TA Tirante	3	6	6^{5}
(United States) N Moreno de Alboran	6^{4}	6	6
7	(Argentina) F Mena	7^{7}	4	1

Quarterfinals
1	(Bolivia) H Dellien	6	6
Alt	(Peru) N Álvarez	1	4
3	(Argentina) F Cerúndolo	6	6
(United States) N Moreno de Alboran	3	4

Semifinals
1	(Bolivia) H Dellien	6	4	3
3	(Argentina) F Cerúndolo	1	6	6

=== Bottom half ===
First round
8	(Argentina) C Ugo Carabelli	6	6
(Brazil) O Luz	2	4
WC	(Bolivia) B Arias	3	2
Q	(Colombia) C Rodríguez	6	6
(Barbados) D King	4	5
WC	(Bolivia) M Dellien	6	7
(Argentina) F Comesaña	4	7	1
4	(Argentina) TM Etcheverry	6	5	0^{r}
6	(Spain) F Verdasco	6	6
(Brazil) M Pucinelli de Almeida	4	1
(Argentina) JP Ficovich	6	6
LL	(Chile) Michel Vernier	1	3
(Chile) G Lama	7^{7}	7^{7}
(Spain) C Gómez-Herrera	6^{4}	6^{3}
Q	(Argentina) P Cachin	6	6
2	(Slovakia) A Martin	2	4

Second round
8	(Argentina) C Ugo Carabelli	6	6
Q	(Colombia) C Rodríguez	3	3
WC	(Bolivia) M Dellien	4	6	6
(Argentina) F Comesaña	6	4	0
6	(Spain) F Verdasco	6	6^{4}	7^{7}
(Argentina) JP Ficovich	3	7^{7}	6^{3}
(Chile) G Lama	6	3	3
Q	(Argentina) P Cachin	4	6	6

Quarterfinals
8	(Argentina) C Ugo Carabelli	7	6
WC	(Bolivia) M Dellien	5	3
6	(Spain) F Verdasco	3	1
Q	(Argentina) P Cachin	6	6

Semifinals
8	(Argentina) C Ugo Carabelli	6	6
Q	(Argentina) P Cachin	3	2
