= 2026 Santa Cruz Challenger II =

- Date: 12–18 October
- Edition: 8th
- Surface: Clay
- Location: Santa Cruz de la Sierra, Bolivia

Champions

Singles
- (Brazil) Thiago Seyboth Wild

Doubles
- (Ecuador) Diego Hidalgo / (Argentina) Mariano Kestelboim
- Santa Cruz Challenger

The 2026 Santa Cruz Challenger II was a professional tennis tournament played on clay courts. It was the eighth edition of the tournament which was part of the 2026 ATP Challenger Tour. It took place in Santa Cruz de la Sierra, Bolivia between 12 and 18 October 2026.

== Singles main-draw entrants ==
=== Seeds ===
Country	Player	Rank^{1}	Seed
ARG	Francisco Comesaña	125	1
BOL	Hugo Dellien	128	2
BRA	Thiago Seyboth Wild	136	3
BOL	Juan Carlos Prado Ángelo	162	4
PER	Gonzalo Bueno	183	5
ARG	Guido Iván Justo	188	6
ARG	Facundo Mena	197	7
ARG	Alex Barrena	224	8

- ^{1} Rankings are as of 5 October 2026.

=== Other entrants ===
The following players received wildcards into the singles main draw:

- (Bolivia) Murkel Dellien
- (Brazil) Guto Miguel
- (Spain) Bernardo Munk Mesa

The following player received entry into the singles main draw using a protected ranking:

- (Brazil) Felipe Meligeni Alves

The following players received entry into the singles main draw as alternates:

- (Argentina) Valerio Aboian
- (Uruguay) Joaquín Aguilar Cardozo
- (Argentina) Juan Estévez
- (Brazil) Eduardo Ribeiro
- (Argentina) Carlos María Zárate

The following players received entry from the qualifying draw:

- (Brazil) Mateus Alves
- (Argentina) Hernán Casanova
- (Argentina) Thiago Cigarrán
- (Peru) Arklon Huertas del Pino
- (Argentina) Lucio Ratti
- (Argentina) Máximo Zeitune

== Champions ==
=== Singles ===
- (Brazil) Thiago Seyboth Wild def. (Bolivia) Hugo Dellien 6–4, 6–3.

=== Doubles ===
- (Ecuador) Diego Hidalgo / (Argentina) Mariano Kestelboim def. (Brazil) Guto Miguel / (Brazil) Eduardo Ribeiro 1–6, 6–4, [10–8].
