= 2023 Santa Cruz Challenger =

- Date: 11–17 September
- Edition: 3rd
- Surface: Clay
- Location: Santa Cruz de la Sierra, Bolivia

Champions

Singles
- (Argentina) Mariano Navone

Doubles
- (Bolivia) Boris Arias / (Bolivia) Federico Zeballos
← 2022 ·	Santa Cruz Challenger	· 2024 →

The 2023 Santa Cruz Challenger was a professional tennis tournament played on clay courts. It was the third edition of the tournament which was part of the 2023 ATP Challenger Tour. It took place in Santa Cruz de la Sierra, Bolivia between 11 and 17 September 2023.

== Singles main-draw entrants ==
=== Seeds ===
Country	Player	Rank^{1}	Seed
ARG	Juan Manuel Cerúndolo	93	1
ARG	Genaro Alberto Olivieri	140	2
BOL	Hugo Dellien	147	3
ARG	Thiago Agustín Tirante	150	4
ARG	Francisco Comesaña	160	5
ARG	Mariano Navone	184	6
ITA	Luciano Darderi	185	7
ARG	Camilo Ugo Carabelli	202	8

- ^{1} Rankings are as of 28 August 2023.

=== Other entrants ===
The following players received wildcards into the singles main draw:

- (Argentina) Juan Ignacio Londero
- (Bolivia) Juan Carlos Prado Ángelo
- (Chile) Matías Soto

The following player received entry into the singles main draw using a protected ranking:

- (Brazil) Pedro Sakamoto

The following players received entry from the qualifying draw:

- (Brazil) Pedro Boscardin Dias
- (Brazil) Orlando Luz
- (Argentina) Facundo Mena
- (Brazil) José Pereira
- (Argentina) Gonzalo Villanueva
- (Brazil) Marcelo Zormann

== Champions ==
=== Singles ===
- (Argentina) Mariano Navone def. (Argentina) Francisco Comesaña 4–6, 7–5, 6–1.

=== Doubles ===
- (Bolivia) Boris Arias / (Bolivia) Federico Zeballos def. (Chile) Matías Soto / (Argentina) Gonzalo Villanueva 6–2, 4–6, [10–7].
