= 2024 Santa Cruz Challenger – Singles =

Singles
- 2024 Santa Cruz Challenger

Final
- Champion: (Argentina) Camilo Ugo Carabelli
- Runner-up: (Bolivia) Murkel Dellien
- Score: 6–4, 6–2

Events
Singles	Doubles
- Santa Cruz Challenger

Mariano Navone was the defending champion but chose not to defend his title.

Camilo Ugo Carabelli won the title after defeating Murkel Dellien 6–4, 6–2 in the final.

== Seeds ==
1. (Brazil) Thiago Monteiro (semifinals)
2. (Argentina) Francisco Comesaña (second round, withdrew)
3. (Argentina) Camilo Ugo Carabelli (champion)
4. (Bolivia) Hugo Dellien (first round)
5. (Argentina) Román Andrés Burruchaga (quarterfinals)
6. (Argentina) Juan Manuel Cerúndolo (quarterfinals)
7. (Argentina) Genaro Alberto Olivieri (second round)
8. (Italy) Marco Cecchinato (first round)

== Draw ==
Key

- Q = Qualifier
- WC = Wild card
- LL = Lucky loser
- Alt = Alternate
- ITF = ITF entry
- PR = Protected ranking
- SR = Special ranking
- SE = Special exempt
- JE = Junior exempt
- JR = Junior Accelerator Programme entrant
- CO = College Accelerator Programme entrant
- NG = Next Gen Accelerator Program entrant
- w/o = Walkover
- r = Retired
- d = Defaulted

=== Finals ===
Semifinals
1/WC	(Brazil) Thiago Monteiro	4	5
3	(Argentina) Camilo Ugo Carabelli	6	7
(Bolivia) Murkel Dellien	6	2	4
(Argentina) Renzo Olivo	1	6	2^{r}

Final
3	(Argentina) Camilo Ugo Carabelli	6	6
(Bolivia) Murkel Dellien	4	2

=== Top half ===
First round
1/WC	(Brazil) T Monteiro	6	6
(Italy) Edoardo Lavagno	2	2
Q	(Argentina) V Aboian	6	5	6
PR	(United Kingdom) P Jubb	3	7	3
(Brazil) M Pucinelli de Almeida	6	6
(Argentina) A Collarini	1	1
(Brazil) P Sakamoto	6	6
8	(Italy) M Cecchinato	4	4
3	(Argentina) C Ugo Carabelli	7^{12}	5	4
WC	(Paraguay) AD Vallejo	6^{10}	7	0^{r}
(Argentina) FA Gómez	4	0
WC	(Bolivia) JC Prado Ángelo	6	6
(Portugal) G Oliveira	6	6
(Italy) Alexander Weis	3	3
(Italy) F Passaro	2	2
7	(Argentina) GA Olivieri	6	6

Second round
1/WC	(Brazil) T Monteiro	6	6
Q	(Argentina) V Aboian	3	3
(Brazil) M Pucinelli de Almeida	7	0	4
(Brazil) P Sakamoto	5	6	6
3	(Argentina) C Ugo Carabelli	7^{7}	6
WC	(Bolivia) JC Prado Ángelo	6^{3}	1
(Portugal) G Oliveira	6	6
7	(Argentina) GA Olivieri	4	2

Quarterfinals
1/WC	(Brazil) T Monteiro	6	6
(Brazil) P Sakamoto	1	4
3	(Argentina) C Ugo Carabelli	4	7^{7}	6
(Portugal) G Oliveira	6	6^{1}	1

Semifinals
1/WC	(Brazil) T Monteiro	4	5
3	(Argentina) C Ugo Carabelli	6	7

=== Bottom half ===
First round
5	(Argentina) RA Burruchaga	6	6
Q	(Argentina) M Kestelboim	2	4
(Italy) G Mager	6	6
(Peru) G Bueno	1	1
(Jamaica) B Bicknell	6	2	3
(Canada) L Draxl	3	6	6
(Bolivia) M Dellien	7	6
4	(Bolivia) H Dellien	5	1
6	(Argentina) JM Cerúndolo	6	6
Q	(Argentina) GI Justo	3	2
Q	(Romania) GA Boitan	6	6
Q	(Argentina) G Villanueva	0	3
Q	(Argentina) JB Torres	3	1
(Argentina) R Olivo	6	6
(Australia) P Sekulic	7^{7}	3	1
2	(Argentina) F Comesaña	6^{5}	6	6

Second round
5	(Argentina) RA Burruchaga	7^{12}	6
(Italy) G Mager	6^{10}	1
(Canada) L Draxl	3	6	5
(Bolivia) M Dellien	6	3	7
6	(Argentina) JM Cerúndolo	6	6
Q	(Romania) GA Boitan	3	1
(Argentina) R Olivo	w/o
2	(Argentina) F Comesaña

Quarterfinals
5	(Argentina) RA Burruchaga	2	6	4
(Bolivia) M Dellien	6	2	6
6	(Argentina) JM Cerúndolo	3	6^{4}
(Argentina) R Olivo	6	7^{7}

Semifinals
(Bolivia) M Dellien	6	2	4
(Argentina) R Olivo	1	6	2^{r}
