= 2022 Santa Cruz Challenger II =

- Date: 21–27 March
- Edition: 2nd
- Surface: Clay
- Location: Santa Cruz de la Sierra, Bolivia

Champions

Singles
- (United Kingdom) Paul Jubb

Doubles
- (Netherlands) Jesper de Jong / (Netherlands) Bart Stevens
← 2022 ·	Santa Cruz Challenger	· 2023 →

The 2022 Santa Cruz Challenger II, also known as Dove MEN + CARE Bolivia Open to differentiate it from the previous edition played the same year, was a professional tennis tournament played on clay courts. It was the second edition of the tournament which was part of the 2022 ATP Challenger Tour. It took place in Santa Cruz de la Sierra, Bolivia between 21 and 27 March 2022.

== Singles main-draw entrants ==
=== Seeds ===
Country	Player	Rank^{1}	Seed
~~BOL~~	~~Hugo Dellien~~	~~101~~	~~1~~
URU	Pablo Cuevas	104	2
PER	Juan Pablo Varillas	117	3
~~ARG~~	~~Tomás Martín Etcheverry~~	~~123~~	~~4~~
CHI	Tomás Barrios Vera	145	5
~~ARG~~	~~Camilo Ugo Carabelli~~	~~175~~	~~6~~
ARG	Facundo Mena	183	7
NED	Jesper de Jong	189	8

- ^{1} Rankings are as of 14 March 2022.

=== Other entrants ===
The following players received wildcards into the singles main draw:

- (Uruguay) Pablo Cuevas
- (Bolivia) Murkel Dellien
- (Bolivia) Juan Carlos Prado Ángelo

The following players received entry into the singles main draw as alternates:

- (Dominican Republic) Nick Hardt
- (Switzerland) Johan Nikles

The following players received entry from the qualifying draw:

- (Colombia) Nicolás Barrientos
- (France) Corentin Denolly
- (Brazil) Gilbert Klier Júnior
- (Japan) Naoki Nakagawa
- (Israel) Yshai Oliel
- (Argentina) Juan Bautista Torres

The following players received entry as lucky losers:

- (Brazil) Daniel Dutra da Silva
- (Argentina) Facundo Juárez
- (Argentina) Gonzalo Villanueva

== Champions ==
=== Singles ===
- (United Kingdom) Paul Jubb def. (Peru) Juan Pablo Varillas 6–3, 7–6^{(7–5)}.

=== Doubles ===
- (Netherlands) Jesper de Jong / (Netherlands) Bart Stevens def. (Colombia) Nicolás Barrientos / (Mexico) Miguel Ángel Reyes-Varela 6–4, 3–6, [10–6].
