= 2026 Santa Cruz Challenger – Doubles =

Doubles
- 2026 Santa Cruz Challenger

Final
- Champions: (Argentina) Hernán Casanova (Argentina) Santiago Rodríguez Taverna
- Runners-up: (Argentina) Mariano Kestelboim (Bolivia) Federico Zeballos
- Score: 7–5, 6–4

Events
Singles	Doubles
- Santa Cruz Challenger

Mariano Kestelboim and Gonzalo Villanueva were the defending champions but chose to defend their title with different partners. Kestelboim partnered Federico Zeballos but lost in the final to Hernán Casanova and Santiago Rodríguez Taverna. Villanueva partnered Ignacio Carou but lost in the quarterfinals to Casanova and Rodríguez Taverna.

Casanova and Rodríguez Taverna won the title after defeating Kestelboim and Zeballos 7–5, 6–4 in the final.

== Seeds ==
1. (Argentina) Mariano Kestelboim / (Bolivia) Federico Zeballos (final)
2. (Uruguay) Ignacio Carou / (Argentina) Gonzalo Villanueva (quarterfinals)
3. (Brazil) Luís Britto / (Brazil) Marcelo Zormann (semifinals)
4. (Argentina) Valentín Basel / (Argentina) Franco Ribero (semifinals)

== Draw ==
Key

- Q = Qualifier
- WC = Wild card
- LL = Lucky loser
- Alt = Alternate
- ITF = ITF entry
- PR = Protected ranking
- SR = Special ranking
- SE = Special exempt
- JE = Junior exempt
- JR = Junior Accelerator Programme entrant
- CO = College Accelerator Programme entrant
- NG = Next Gen Accelerator Program entrant
- w/o = Walkover
- r = Retired
- d = Defaulted

First round
1	(Argentina) M Kestelboim (Bolivia) F Zeballos	6	6
(Italy) Matteo Covato (United States) Ryan Dickerson	2	1
WC	(Bolivia) Salvador Rallin (Bolivia) Matías Rivero	2	1
(Argentina) Thiago Cigarrán (Argentina) Lorenzo Joaquín Rodríguez	6	6
3	(Brazil) L Britto (Brazil) M Zormann	6	6
(Brazil) Lucca Pinto (Brazil) Victor Hugo Remondy Pagotto	4	1
Alt	(Brazil) Victor Braga (Brazil) João Vítor Scramin do Lago	6^{5}	4
(Brazil) Bruno Oliveira (Brazil) P Sakamoto	7^{7}	6
(United States) P Kumar (United States) N Schachter	6	2	[6]
WC	(United States) Preston Brown (Bolivia) Leonardo Suárez	0	6	[10]
(Argentina) V Aboian (Argentina) S de la Fuente	4	4
4	(Argentina) Valentín Basel (Argentina) F Ribero	6	6
(Argentina) H Casanova (Argentina) S Rodríguez Taverna	7^{9}	7
(Argentina) LE Ambrogi (Brazil) Gabriel Roveri Sidney	6^{7}	5
Alt	(Chile) Daniel Antonio Núñez (Ukraine) Eric Vanshelboim	2	3
2	(Uruguay) I Carou (Argentina) G Villanueva	6	6

Quarterfinals
1	(Argentina) M Kestelboim (Bolivia) F Zeballos	7	3	[10]
(Argentina) T Cigarrán (Argentina) LJ Rodríguez	5	6	[6]
3	(Brazil) L Britto (Brazil) M Zormann	6	4	[10]
(Brazil) B Oliveira (Brazil) P Sakamoto	4	6	[1]
WC	(United States) P Brown (Bolivia) L Suárez	4	4
4	(Argentina) V Basel (Argentina) F Ribero	6	6
(Argentina) H Casanova (Argentina) S Rodríguez Taverna	0	6	[11]
2	(Uruguay) I Carou (Argentina) G Villanueva	6	3	[9]

Semifinals
1	(Argentina) M Kestelboim (Bolivia) F Zeballos	6	4	[11]
3	(Brazil) L Britto (Brazil) M Zormann	3	6	[9]
4	(Argentina) V Basel (Argentina) F Ribero	6^{4}	6	[5]
(Argentina) H Casanova (Argentina) S Rodríguez Taverna	7^{7}	2	[10]

Final
1	(Argentina) M Kestelboim (Bolivia) F Zeballos	5	4
(Argentina) H Casanova (Argentina) S Rodríguez Taverna	7	6
