= 2024 Santa Cruz Challenger – Doubles =

Doubles
- 2024 Santa Cruz Challenger

Final
- Champions: (Argentina) Andrea Collarini (Argentina) Renzo Olivo
- Runners-up: (Bolivia) Hugo Dellien (Bolivia) Murkel Dellien
- Score: 6–4, 6–1

Events
Singles	Doubles
- Santa Cruz Challenger

Boris Arias and Federico Zeballos were the defending champions but lost in the quarterfinals to Hugo and Murkel Dellien.

Andrea Collarini and Renzo Olivo won the title after defeating Dellien and Dellien 6–4, 6–1 in the final.

== Seeds ==
1. (United States) Evan King / (United States) Reese Stalder (quarterfinals)
2. (Bolivia) Boris Arias / (Bolivia) Federico Zeballos (quarterfinals)
3. (Brazil) Fernando Romboli / (Brazil) Marcelo Zormann (first round)
4. (Argentina) Guillermo Durán / (Argentina) Federico Agustín Gómez (first round)

== Draw ==
Key

- Q = Qualifier
- WC = Wild card
- LL = Lucky loser
- Alt = Alternate
- ITF = ITF entry
- PR = Protected ranking
- SR = Special ranking
- SE = Special exempt
- JE = Junior exempt
- JR = Junior Accelerator Programme entrant
- CO = College Accelerator Programme entrant
- NG = Next Gen Accelerator Program entrant
- w/o = Walkover
- r = Retired
- d = Defaulted

First round
1	(United States) E King (United States) R Stalder	w/o
Alt	(Canada) L Draxl (Brazil) P Sakamoto
WC	(Bolivia) Esteban Dávila (Bolivia) Salvador Rallin	4	4
(Brazil) P Boscardin Dias (Argentina) G Villanueva	6	6
4	(Argentina) G Durán (Argentina) FA Gómez	6	4	[8]
(Argentina) RA Burruchaga (Argentina) GA Olivieri	3	6	[10]
WC	(Bolivia) JC Prado Ángelo (Paraguay) AD Vallejo	2	6	[6]
(Argentina) A Collarini (Argentina) R Olivo	6	4	[10]
(Uruguay) I Carou (Argentina) C Ugo Carabelli	7^{7}	6
(Italy) Edoardo Lavagno (Italy) Alexander Weis	6^{5}	3
(Argentina) M Kestelboim (Italy) F Passaro	6	5	[10]
3	(Brazil) F Romboli (Brazil) M Zormann	4	7	[7]
(Bolivia) H Dellien (Bolivia) M Dellien	7^{8}	7
(Portugal) G Oliveira (Australia) A Taylor	6^{6}	5
(Peru) G Bueno (Peru) C Huertas del Pino	4	3
2	(Bolivia) B Arias (Bolivia) F Zeballos	6	6

Quarterfinals
1	(United States) E King (United States) R Stalder	7^{8}	4	[7]
(Brazil) P Boscardin Dias (Argentina) G Villanueva	6^{6}	6	[10]
(Argentina) RA Burruchaga (Argentina) GA Olivieri	5	6^{6}
(Argentina) A Collarini (Argentina) R Olivo	7	7^{8}
(Uruguay) I Carou (Argentina) C Ugo Carabelli	6	7
(Argentina) M Kestelboim (Italy) F Passaro	4	5
(Bolivia) H Dellien (Bolivia) M Dellien	6	7
2	(Bolivia) B Arias (Bolivia) F Zeballos	4	5

Semifinals
(Brazil) P Boscardin Dias (Argentina) G Villanueva
(Argentina) A Collarini (Argentina) R Olivo	w/o
(Uruguay) I Carou (Argentina) C Ugo Carabelli	3	2
(Bolivia) H Dellien (Bolivia) M Dellien	6	6

Final
(Argentina) A Collarini (Argentina) R Olivo	6	6
(Bolivia) H Dellien (Bolivia) M Dellien	4	1
