= 2025 Santa Cruz Challenger =

- Date: 16–21 June
- Edition: 6th
- Surface: Clay
- Location: Santa Cruz de la Sierra, Bolivia

Champions

Singles
- (Argentina) Alex Barrena

Doubles
- (Argentina) Mariano Kestelboim / (Argentina) Gonzalo Villanueva
- Santa Cruz Challenger

The 2025 Bolivia Open was a professional tennis tournament played on clay courts. It was the sixth edition of the tournament which was part of the 2025 ATP Challenger Tour. It took place in Santa Cruz de la Sierra, Bolivia between 16 and 21 June 2025.

== Singles main-draw entrants ==
=== Seeds ===
Country	Player	Rank^{1}	Seed
BOL	Murkel Dellien	220	1
~~BRA~~	~~Matheus Pucinelli de Almeida~~	~~282~~	~~2~~
ARG	Juan Bautista Torres	283	3
ARG	Genaro Alberto Olivieri	289	4
ARG	Renzo Olivo	304	5
BOL	Juan Carlos Prado Ángelo	310	6
ARG	Lautaro Midón	311	7
BRA	João Lucas Reis da Silva	313	8

- ^{1} Rankings are as of 9 June 2025.

=== Other entrants ===
The following players received wildcards into the singles main draw:

- (Argentina) Facundo Bagnis
- (Bolivia) Raúl García
- (Bolivia) Federico Zeballos

The following player received entry into the singles main draw as an alternate:

- (Argentina) Tomás Farjat

The following players received entry from the qualifying draw:

- (Mexico) Luis Carlos Álvarez
- (Spain) Diego Augusto Barreto Sánchez
- (Argentina) Santiago de la Fuente
- (Germany) Lucas Gerch
- (Germany) John Sperle
- (Argentina) Bautista Vilicich

The following player received entry as a lucky loser:

- (Argentina) Juan Manuel La Serna

== Champions ==
=== Singles ===
- (Argentina) Alex Barrena def. (Uruguay) Franco Roncadelli 5–7, 7–5, 6–3.

=== Doubles ===
- (Argentina) Mariano Kestelboim / (Argentina) Gonzalo Villanueva def. (Bolivia) Boris Arias / (Bolivia) Federico Zeballos 6–3, 6–2.
