= 2026 Santa Cruz Challenger II – Doubles =

Doubles
- 2026 Santa Cruz Challenger II

Final
- Champions: (Ecuador) Diego Hidalgo (Argentina) Mariano Kestelboim
- Runners-up: (Brazil) Guto Miguel (Brazil) Eduardo Ribeiro
- Score: 1–6, 6–4, [10–8]

Events
Singles	Doubles
- Santa Cruz Challenger

Hernán Casanova and Santiago Rodríguez Taverna were the defending champions but lost in the semifinals to Diego Hidalgo and Mariano Kestelboim.

Hidalgo and Kestelboim won the title after defeating Guto Miguel and Eduardo Ribeiro 1–6, 6–4, [10–8] in the final.

== Seeds ==
1. (Ecuador) Diego Hidalgo / (Argentina) Mariano Kestelboim (champions)
2. (Brazil) Guto Miguel / (Brazil) Eduardo Ribeiro (final)
3. (Bolivia) Boris Arias / (Uruguay) Ignacio Carou (semifinals)
4. (Brazil) Mateus Alves / (Brazil) Marcelo Zormann (quarterfinals)

== Draw ==
Key

- Q = Qualifier
- WC = Wild card
- LL = Lucky loser
- Alt = Alternate
- ITF = ITF entry
- PR = Protected ranking
- SR = Special ranking
- SE = Special exempt
- JE = Junior exempt
- JR = Junior Accelerator Programme entrant
- CO = College Accelerator Programme entrant
- NG = Next Gen Accelerator Program entrant
- w/o = Walkover
- r = Retired
- d = Defaulted

First round
1	(Ecuador) D Hidalgo (Argentina) M Kestelboim	6	6
WC	(Bolivia) Nicolás Ciancaglini (Bolivia) Agustín Eduardo Cuéllar Lorberg	2	1
(Bolivia) M Dellien (Bolivia) F Zeballos
(Uruguay) F Roncadelli (Argentina) Carlos María Zárate	w/o
4	(Brazil) M Alves (Brazil) M Zormann	6	5	[10]
(Argentina) Juan Estévez (Argentina) Lucio Ratti	3	7	[5]
(Brazil) L Britto (Brazil) PA Saraiva dos Santos	3	4
(Argentina) H Casanova (Argentina) S Rodríguez Taverna	6	6
Alt	(Argentina) Thiago Cigarrán (Argentina) N Kicker	4	6	[8]
(Argentina) F Ribero (Argentina) G Villanueva	6	4	[10]
(Argentina) JM La Serna (Argentina) Máximo Zeitune	6	4	[2]
3	(Bolivia) B Arias (Uruguay) I Carou	4	6	[10]
(Peru) A Huertas del Pino (Peru) A Merino	3	4
Alt	(Uruguay) J Aguilar Cardozo (Argentina) S de la Fuente	6	6
(Brazil) Bruno Oliveira (Brazil) Natan Rodrigues	2	6^{8}
2	(Brazil) G Miguel (Brazil) E Ribeiro	6	7^{10}

Quarterfinals
1	(Ecuador) D Hidalgo (Argentina) M Kestelboim	6	6
(Uruguay) F Roncadelli (Argentina) CM Zárate	2	4
4	(Brazil) M Alves (Brazil) M Zormann	2	1
(Argentina) H Casanova (Argentina) S Rodríguez Taverna	6	6
(Argentina) F Ribero (Argentina) G Villanueva	4	4
3	(Bolivia) B Arias (Uruguay) I Carou	6	6
Alt	(Uruguay) J Aguilar Cardozo (Argentina) S de la Fuente	5	4
2	(Brazil) G Miguel (Brazil) E Ribeiro	7	6

Semifinals
1	(Ecuador) D Hidalgo (Argentina) M Kestelboim	7^{12}	7^{9}
(Argentina) H Casanova (Argentina) S Rodríguez Taverna	6^{10}	6^{7}
3	(Bolivia) B Arias (Uruguay) I Carou	3	3
2	(Brazil) G Miguel (Brazil) E Ribeiro	6	6

Final
1	(Ecuador) D Hidalgo (Argentina) M Kestelboim	1	6	[10]
2	(Brazil) G Miguel (Brazil) E Ribeiro	6	4	[8]
