= 2024 Santa Cruz Challenger =

- Date: 4–10 March
- Edition: 4th
- Surface: Clay
- Location: Santa Cruz de la Sierra, Bolivia

Champions

Singles
- (Argentina) Camilo Ugo Carabelli

Doubles
- (Argentina) Andrea Collarini / (Argentina) Renzo Olivo
- Santa Cruz Challenger

The 2024 Santa Cruz Challenger was a professional tennis tournament played on clay courts. It was the forth edition of the tournament which was part of the 2024 ATP Challenger Tour. It took place in Santa Cruz de la Sierra, Bolivia between 4 and 10 March 2024.

== Singles main-draw entrants ==
=== Seeds ===
Country	Player	Rank^{1}	Seed
BRA	Thiago Monteiro	102	1
ARG	Francisco Comesaña	114	2
ARG	Camilo Ugo Carabelli	127	3
BOL	Hugo Dellien	157	4
ARG	Román Andrés Burruchaga	159	5
ARG	Juan Manuel Cerúndolo	161	6
ARG	Genaro Alberto Olivieri	174	7
ITA	Marco Cecchinato	198	8

- ^{1} Rankings are as of 26 February 2024.

=== Other entrants ===
The following players received wildcards into the singles main draw:

- (Brazil) Thiago Monteiro
- (Bolivia) Juan Carlos Prado Ángelo
- (Paraguay) Daniel Vallejo

The following player received entry into the singles main draw using a protected ranking:

- (United Kingdom) Paul Jubb

The following players received entry from the qualifying draw:

- (Argentina) Valerio Aboian
- (Romania) Gabi Adrian Boitan
- (Argentina) Guido Iván Justo
- (Argentina) Mariano Kestelboim
- (Argentina) Juan Bautista Torres
- (Argentina) Gonzalo Villanueva

== Champions ==
=== Singles ===
- (Argentina) Camilo Ugo Carabelli def. (Bolivia) Murkel Dellien 6–4, 6–2.

=== Doubles ===
- (Argentina) Andrea Collarini / (Argentina) Renzo Olivo def. (Bolivia) Hugo Dellien / (Bolivia) Murkel Dellien 6–4, 6–1.
