= 2022 Santa Cruz Challenger =

- Date: 24–30 January
- Edition: 1st
- Surface: Clay
- Location: Santa Cruz de la Sierra, Bolivia

Champions

Singles
- (Argentina) Francisco Cerúndolo

Doubles
- (Ecuador) Diego Hidalgo / (Colombia) Cristian Rodríguez
Santa Cruz Challenger	· 2022 →

The 2022 Santa Cruz Challenger, also known as Dove MEN + CARE Challenger Bolivia, was a professional tennis tournament played on clay courts. It was the first edition of the tournament which was part of the 2022 ATP Challenger Tour. It took place in Santa Cruz de la Sierra, Bolivia between 24 and 30 January 2022.

== Singles main-draw entrants ==
=== Seeds ===
Country	Player	Rank^{1}	Seed
BOL	Hugo Dellien	114	1
SVK	Andrej Martin	116	2
ARG	Francisco Cerúndolo	127	3
ARG	Tomás Martín Etcheverry	131	4
CZE	Zdeněk Kolář	143	5
ESP	Fernando Verdasco	170	6
ARG	Facundo Mena	209	7
ARG	Camilo Ugo Carabelli	215	8

- ^{1} Rankings are as of 17 January 2022.

=== Other entrants ===
The following players received wildcards into the singles main draw:

- (Bolivia) Boris Arias
- (Bolivia) Murkel Dellien
- (Bolivia) Federico Zeballos

The following player received entry into the singles main draw as an alternate:

- (Peru) Nicolás Álvarez

The following players received entry from the qualifying draw:

- (Argentina) Pedro Cachin
- (Argentina) Matías Franco Descotte
- (Ecuador) Diego Hidalgo
- (Bolivia) Juan Carlos Prado Ángelo
- (Colombia) Cristian Rodríguez
- (Argentina) Gonzalo Villanueva

The following player received entry as a lucky loser:

- (Chile) Michel Vernier

== Champions ==
=== Singles ===
- (Argentina) Francisco Cerúndolo def. (Argentina) Camilo Ugo Carabelli 6–4, 6–3.

=== Doubles ===
- (Ecuador) Diego Hidalgo / (Colombia) Cristian Rodríguez def. (Slovakia) Andrej Martin / (Austria) Tristan-Samuel Weissborn 4–6, 6–3, [10–8].
