= 2022 Santa Cruz Challenger II – Singles =

Singles
- 2022 Santa Cruz Challenger II

Final
- Champion: (United Kingdom) Paul Jubb
- Runner-up: (Peru) Juan Pablo Varillas
- Score: 6–3, 7–6^{(7–5)}

Events
Singles	Doubles
- Santa Cruz Challenger

Francisco Cerúndolo was the defending champion but chose not to defend his title.

Paul Jubb won the title after defeating Juan Pablo Varillas 6–3, 7–6^{(7–5)} in the final.

== Seeds ==
1. (Bolivia) Hugo Dellien (withdrew)
2. (Uruguay) Pablo Cuevas (semifinals)
3. (Peru) Juan Pablo Varillas (final)
4. (Argentina) Tomás Martín Etcheverry (withdrew)
5. (Chile) Tomás Barrios Vera (quarterfinals)
6. (Argentina) Camilo Ugo Carabelli (withdrew)
7. (Argentina) Facundo Mena (quarterfinals)
8. (Netherlands) Jesper de Jong (second round, retired)

== Draw ==
Key

- Q = Qualifier
- WC = Wild card
- LL = Lucky loser
- Alt = Alternate
- ITF = ITF entry
- PR = Protected ranking
- SR = Special ranking
- SE = Special exempt
- JE = Junior exempt
- JR = Junior Accelerator Programme entrant
- CO = College Accelerator Programme entrant
- NG = Next Gen Accelerator Program entrant
- w/o = Walkover
- r = Retired
- d = Defaulted

=== Finals ===
Semifinals
(United Kingdom) Paul Jubb	6	7
LL	(Brazil) Daniel Dutra da Silva	4	5
3	(Peru) Juan Pablo Varillas	6	6
2/WC	(Uruguay) Pablo Cuevas	2	4

Final
(United Kingdom) Paul Jubb	6	7^{7}
3	(Peru) Juan Pablo Varillas	3	6^{5}

=== Top half ===
First round
Q	(Japan) N Nakagawa	2	4
(United Kingdom) P Jubb	6	6
Q	(Argentina) JB Torres	6	6
Q	(Brazil) Gilbert Klier Júnior	3	4
(Argentina) H Casanova	6	7
Q	(France) C Denolly	4	5
Q	(Israel) Y Oliel	6^{1}	3
8	(Netherlands) J de Jong	7^{7}	6
LL	(Brazil) D Dutra da Silva	6	6
(Austria) G Melzer	2	3
(Argentina) A Collarini	3	4
(Brazil) M Pucinelli de Almeida	6	6
(Chile) G Lama	5	2
(Brazil) F Meligeni Alves	7	6
Alt	(Dominican Republic) N Hardt	3	6	1
5	(Chile) T Barrios Vera	6	3	6

Second round
(United Kingdom) P Jubb	6	6
Q	(Argentina) JB Torres	2	3
(Argentina) H Casanova	4
8	(Netherlands) J de Jong	0^{r}
LL	(Brazil) D Dutra da Silva	6	6
(Brazil) M Pucinelli de Almeida	4	4
(Brazil) F Meligeni Alves	6	3	4
5	(Chile) T Barrios Vera	4	6	6

Quarterfinals
(United Kingdom) P Jubb	6	7^{7}
(Argentina) H Casanova	3	6^{4}
LL	(Brazil) D Dutra da Silva	6	6
5	(Chile) T Barrios Vera	4	3

Semifinals
(United Kingdom) P Jubb	6	7
LL	(Brazil) D Dutra da Silva	4	5

=== Bottom half ===
First round
7	(Argentina) F Mena	7	6
(Portugal) G Oliveira	5	4
(United States) N Moreno de Alboran	3	1
(Switzerland) A Ritschard	6	6
Alt	(Switzerland) J Nikles	6	6
WC	(Bolivia) JC Prado Ángelo	2	4
(Argentina) R Olivo	2	2
3	(Peru) JP Varillas	6	6
LL	(Argentina) G Villanueva	5	6^{4}
(Argentina) S Rodríguez Taverna	7	7^{7}
(Argentina) GA Olivieri	2	7^{7}	6
Q	(Colombia) N Barrientos	6	6^{4}	2
LL	(Argentina) Facundo Juárez	0	6^{5}
(Canada) S Diez	6	7^{7}
WC	(Bolivia) M Dellien	4	6	3
2/WC	(Uruguay) P Cuevas	6	3	6

Second round
7	(Argentina) F Mena	2	7^{7}	6
(Switzerland) A Ritschard	6	6^{5}	4
Alt	(Switzerland) J Nikles	2	1
3	(Peru) JP Varillas	6	6
(Argentina) S Rodríguez Taverna	6^{4}	4
(Argentina) GA Olivieri	7^{7}	6
(Canada) S Diez	4	1
2/WC	(Uruguay) P Cuevas	6	6

Quarterfinals
7	(Argentina) F Mena	4	5
3	(Peru) JP Varillas	6	7
(Argentina) GA Olivieri	6	1	2
2/WC	(Uruguay) P Cuevas	3	6	6

Semifinals
3	(Peru) JP Varillas	6	6
2/WC	(Uruguay) P Cuevas	2	4
