= 2026 Santa Cruz Challenger =

- Date: 13–18 April
- Edition: 7th
- Surface: Clay
- Location: Santa Cruz de la Sierra, Bolivia

Champions

Singles
- (Bolivia) Hugo Dellien

Doubles
- (Argentina) Hernán Casanova / (Argentina) Santiago Rodríguez Taverna
- Santa Cruz Challenger

The 2026 Bolivia Open was a professional tennis tournament played on clay courts. It was the seventh edition of the tournament which was part of the 2026 ATP Challenger Tour. It took place in Santa Cruz de la Sierra, Bolivia between 13 and 18 April 2026.

== Singles main-draw entrants ==
=== Seeds ===
Country	Player	Rank^{1}	Seed
BOL	Hugo Dellien	155	1
BOL	Juan Carlos Prado Ángelo	196	2
PER	Gonzalo Bueno	211	3
~~ARG~~	~~Lautaro Midón~~	~~223~~	~~4~~
ARG	Santiago Rodríguez Taverna	231	5
BRA	Thiago Seyboth Wild	248	6
ARG	Guido Iván Justo	269	7
URU	Franco Roncadelli	273	8
PER	Juan Pablo Varillas	286	9

- ^{1} Rankings are as of 6 April 2026.

=== Other entrants ===
The following players received wildcards into the singles main draw:

- (Argentina) Federico Coria
- (Brazil) Guto Miguel
- (Brazil) Thiago Seyboth Wild

The following players received entry into the singles main draw as alternates:

- (Argentina) Lorenzo Joaquín Rodríguez
- (Ukraine) Eric Vanshelboim
- (Argentina) Carlos María Zárate

The following players received entry from the qualifying draw:

- (Argentina) Thiago Cigarrán
- (Argentina) Santiago de la Fuente
- (Colombia) Samuel Alejandro Linde Palacios
- (Argentina) Franco Ribero
- (Chile) Nicolás Villalón
- (Argentina) Máximo Zeitune

The following player received entry as a lucky loser:

- (United States) Ryan Dickerson

== Champions ==
=== Singles ===
- (Bolivia) Hugo Dellien def. (Bolivia) Juan Carlos Prado Ángelo 6–4, 7–5.

=== Doubles ===
- (Argentina) Hernán Casanova / (Argentina) Santiago Rodríguez Taverna def. (Argentina) Mariano Kestelboim / (Bolivia) Federico Zeballos 7–5, 6–4.
