= 2025 Santa Cruz Challenger – Doubles =

Doubles
- 2025 Santa Cruz Challenger

Final
- Champions: (Argentina) Mariano Kestelboim (Argentina) Gonzalo Villanueva
- Runners-up: (Bolivia) Boris Arias (Bolivia) Federico Zeballos
- Score: 6–3, 6–2

Events
Singles	Doubles
- Santa Cruz Challenger

Hady Habib and Trey Hilderbrand were the defending champions but chose not to defend their title.

Mariano Kestelboim and Gonzalo Villanueva won the title after defeating Boris Arias and Federico Zeballos 6–3, 6–2 in the final.

== Seeds ==
1. (Bolivia) Boris Arias / (Bolivia) Federico Zeballos (final)
2. (Argentina) Mariano Kestelboim / (Argentina) Gonzalo Villanueva (champions)
3. (Thailand) Pruchya Isaro / (Canada) Kelsey Stevenson (first round)
4. (Peru) Arklon Huertas del Pino / (Peru) Conner Huertas del Pino (semifinals)

== Draw ==
Key

- Q = Qualifier
- WC = Wild card
- LL = Lucky loser
- Alt = Alternate
- ITF = ITF entry
- PR = Protected ranking
- SR = Special ranking
- SE = Special exempt
- JE = Junior exempt
- JR = Junior Accelerator Programme entrant
- CO = College Accelerator Programme entrant
- NG = Next Gen Accelerator Program entrant
- w/o = Walkover
- r = Retired
- d = Defaulted

=== Draw ===
First round
1	(Bolivia) B Arias (Bolivia) F Zeballos	6	6
Alt	(Spain) Diego Augusto Barreto Sánchez (United States) Dali Blanch	2	4
(Argentina) LE Ambrogi (Argentina) Tomás Farjat	6	3	[5]
(Argentina) S de la Fuente (Argentina) GA Olivieri	3	6	[10]
4	(Peru) A Huertas del Pino (Peru) C Huertas del Pino	6	7
PR	(Brazil) M Barreiros Reyes (Colombia) JS Gómez	4	5
(United States) S Bangoura (Israel) R Stepanov	w/o
(Argentina) H Casanova (Uruguay) F Roncadelli
(Brazil) P Boscardin Dias (Argentina) JB Torres	6	6
WC	(Bolivia) Nicolás Donoso (Bolivia) Andrés Urquiola Montellano	1	2
(Canada) JC Aguilar (Canada) Alvin Nicholas Tudorica	6	1	[10]
3	(Thailand) P Isaro (Canada) K Stevenson	3	6	[6]
(Germany) Lucas Gerch (Germany) John Sperle	6	6
WC	(Bolivia) Matias Peñaranda (Bolivia) Leonardo Suárez	3	1
(Brazil) L Britto (Uruguay) I Carou	4	6^{8}
2	(Argentina) M Kestelboim (Argentina) G Villanueva	6	7^{10}

Quarterfinals
1	(Bolivia) B Arias (Bolivia) F Zeballos	6	6
(Argentina) S de la Fuente (Argentina) GA Olivieri	4	4
4	(Peru) A Huertas del Pino (Peru) C Huertas del Pino	5	6	[10]
(United States) S Bangoura (Israel) R Stepanov	7	3	[4]
(Brazil) P Boscardin Dias (Argentina) JB Torres	w/o
(Canada) JC Aguilar (Canada) AN Tudorica
(Germany) L Gerch (Germany) J Sperle	1	0^{r}
2	(Argentina) M Kestelboim (Argentina) G Villanueva	6	1

Semifinals
1	(Bolivia) B Arias (Bolivia) F Zeballos	2	6	[10]
4	(Peru) A Huertas del Pino (Peru) C Huertas del Pino	6	3	[8]
(Brazil) P Boscardin Dias (Argentina) JB Torres
2	(Argentina) M Kestelboim (Argentina) G Villanueva	w/o

Final
1	(Bolivia) B Arias (Bolivia) F Zeballos	3	2
2	(Argentina) M Kestelboim (Argentina) G Villanueva	6	6
