= 2024 Santa Cruz Challenger II =

- Date: 17–22 June
- Edition: 5th
- Surface: Clay
- Location: Santa Cruz de la Sierra, Bolivia

Champions

Singles
- (Argentina) Juan Manuel Cerúndolo

Doubles
- (Lebanon) Hady Habib / (United States) Trey Hilderbrand
- Santa Cruz Challenger

The 2024 Santa Cruz Challenger II was a professional tennis tournament played on clay courts. It was the fifth edition of the tournament which was part of the 2024 ATP Challenger Tour. It took place in Santa Cruz de la Sierra, Bolivia between 17 and 22 June 2024.

== Singles main-draw entrants ==
=== Seeds ===
Country	Player	Rank^{1}	Seed
ARG	Juan Manuel Cerúndolo	181	1
BOL	Murkel Dellien	214	2
ARG	Andrea Collarini	255	3
LIB	Hady Habib	259	4
ECU	Álvaro Guillén Meza	280	5
BRA	Pedro Sakamoto	304	6
ARG	Renzo Olivo	305	7
ARG	Facundo Mena	307	8

- ^{1} Rankings are as of 10 June 2024.

=== Other entrants ===
The following players received wildcards into the singles main draw:

- (Bolivia) Agustín Eduardo Cuéllar Lorberg
- (Bolivia) Raúl García
- (Ecuador) Emilio Gómez

The following player received entry into the singles main draw as a special exempt:

- (Brazil) Pedro Boscardin Dias

The following player received entry into the singles main draw using a protected ranking:

- (Peru) ~~Nicolás Álvarez~~

The following players received entry into the singles main draw as alternates:

- (Colombia) Adrià Soriano Barrera
- (Brazil) Nicolas Zanellato

The following players received entry from the qualifying draw:

- (Argentina) Leonardo Aboian
- (Spain) Diego Augusto Barreto Sánchez
- (United States) Dali Blanch
- (Argentina) Guido Iván Justo
- (Brazil) José Pereira
- (United States) Noah Schachter

The following player received entry as a lucky loser:

- (United States) Ulises Blanch

== Champions ==
=== Singles ===
- (Argentina) Juan Manuel Cerúndolo def. (Ecuador) Álvaro Guillén Meza 3–6, 6–1, 6–4.

=== Doubles ===
- (Lebanon) Hady Habib / (United States) Trey Hilderbrand def. (New Zealand) Finn Reynolds / (Chile) Matías Soto 3–6, 6–3, [10–7].
