= 2022 Santa Cruz Challenger II – Doubles =

Doubles
- 2022 Santa Cruz Challenger II

Final
- Champions: (Netherlands) Jesper de Jong (Netherlands) Bart Stevens
- Runners-up: (Colombia) Nicolás Barrientos (Mexico) Miguel Ángel Reyes-Varela
- Score: 6–4, 3–6, [10–6]

Events
Singles	Doubles
- Santa Cruz Challenger

Diego Hidalgo and Cristian Rodríguez were the defending champions but lost in the semifinals to Jesper de Jong and Bart Stevens.

De Jong and Stevens won the title after defeating Nicolás Barrientos and Miguel Ángel Reyes-Varela 6–4, 3–6, [10–6] in the final.

== Seeds ==
1. (Argentina) Guillermo Durán / (Brazil) Fernando Romboli (quarterfinals)
2. (Venezuela) Luis David Martínez / (Brazil) Felipe Meligeni Alves (quarterfinals)
3. (Colombia) Nicolás Barrientos / (Mexico) Miguel Ángel Reyes-Varela (final)
4. (Peru) Sergio Galdós / (Portugal) Gonçalo Oliveira (quarterfinals)

== Draw ==
Key

- Q = Qualifier
- WC = Wild card
- LL = Lucky loser
- Alt = Alternate
- ITF = ITF entry
- PR = Protected ranking
- SR = Special ranking
- SE = Special exempt
- JE = Junior exempt
- JR = Junior Accelerator Programme entrant
- CO = College Accelerator Programme entrant
- NG = Next Gen Accelerator Program entrant
- w/o = Walkover
- r = Retired
- d = Defaulted

First round
1	(Argentina) G Durán (Brazil) F Romboli	6	6
(Brazil) D Dutra da Silva (Peru) A Merino	4	3
Alt	(Dominican Republic) P Bertran (Dominican Republic) N Hardt	7	4	[5]
(Argentina) H Casanova (Argentina) S Rodríguez Taverna	5	6	[10]
3	(Colombia) N Barrientos (Mexico) MÁ Reyes-Varela	3	6	[10]
(Bolivia) B Arias (Bolivia) F Zeballos	6	0	[6]
(Argentina) A Collarini (Argentina) JB Torres	1	7	[4]
WC	(Bolivia) M Dellien (Bolivia) JC Prado Ángelo	6	5	[10]
(Netherlands) J de Jong (Netherlands) B Stevens	6	6
WC	(Bolivia) A Mendoza (Peru) J Panta	2	2
(France) C Denolly (Japan) R Noguchi	6^{4}	4
4	(Peru) S Galdós (Portugal) G Oliveira	7^{7}	6
(Switzerland) J Nikles (Switzerland) A Ritschard	3	3
(Ecuador) D Hidalgo (Colombia) C Rodríguez	6	6
(Canada) S Diez (Argentina) Facundo Juárez	3	1
2	(Venezuela) LD Martínez (Brazil) F Meligeni Alves	6	6

Quarterfinals
1	(Argentina) G Durán (Brazil) F Romboli	6^{7}	4
(Argentina) H Casanova (Argentina) S Rodríguez Taverna	7^{9}	6
3	(Colombia) N Barrientos (Mexico) MÁ Reyes-Varela	6	6
WC	(Bolivia) M Dellien (Bolivia) JC Prado Ángelo	2	4
(Netherlands) J de Jong (Netherlands) B Stevens	0	7^{8}	[12]
4	(Peru) S Galdós (Portugal) G Oliveira	6	6^{6}	[10]
(Ecuador) D Hidalgo (Colombia) C Rodríguez	6	6
2	(Venezuela) LD Martínez (Brazil) F Meligeni Alves	1	2

Semifinals
(Argentina) H Casanova (Argentina) S Rodríguez Taverna	3	3^{r}
3	(Colombia) N Barrientos (Mexico) MÁ Reyes-Varela	6	5
(Netherlands) J de Jong (Netherlands) B Stevens	2	6	[11]
(Ecuador) D Hidalgo (Colombia) C Rodríguez	6	3	[9]

Final
3	(Colombia) N Barrientos (Mexico) MÁ Reyes-Varela	4	6	[6]
(Netherlands) J de Jong (Netherlands) B Stevens	6	3	[10]
