= Matías Soto (tennis) =

Chilean tennis player

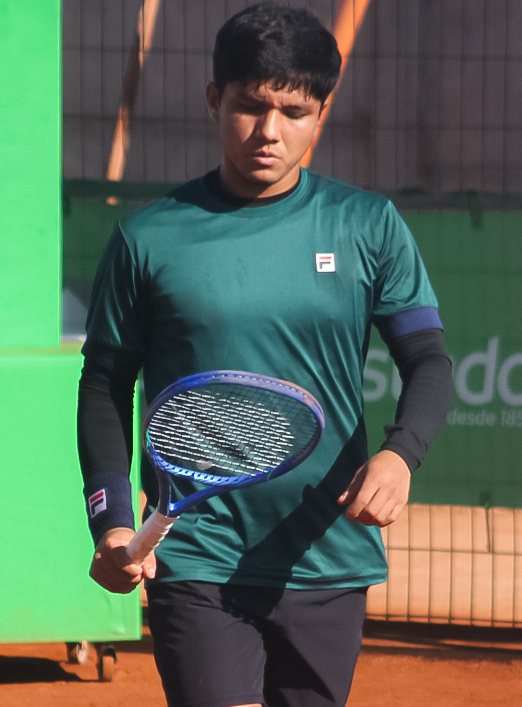
- Soto in 2025
- Full name: Matías Nicolás Soto Carmona
- ITF name: Matias Soto
- Country (sports): Chile
- Born: 27 April 1999 (age 27) Copiapó, Chile
- Height: 1.70 m (5 ft 7 in)
- Plays: Right-handed (two-handed backhand)
- College: Baylor
- Coach: Mario Soto
- Prize money: US $328,073

Singles
- Career record: 1–2
- Career titles: 0
- Highest ranking: No. 237 (14 September 2026)
- Current ranking: No. 257 (9 November 2026)

Doubles
- Career record: 7–6
- Career titles: 0
- Highest ranking: No. 102 (4 August 2025)
- Current ranking: No. 287 (9 November 2026)
- Last updated on: 9 November 2026.

Matías Soto (born 27 April 1999) is a Chilean tennis player. He has a career-high ATP singles ranking of No. 237 achieved on 14 September 2026 and a doubles ranking of No. 102 reached on 4 August 2025. He is currently the No. 5 player from Chile.

Soto represents Chile at the Davis Cup.

He played college tennis at Baylor University.

== Professional career ==
Soto made his ATP main draw debut in doubles at the 2023 Chile Open after receiving a wildcard with Thiago Seyboth Wild, where he notched his first career ATP tour-level win in doubles, and after two more wins, he reached his first career ATP doubles final. As a result, he reached the top 300 in the doubles rankings.

Soto also received a wildcard for the 2024 Chile Open this time partnering Orlando Luz, another Brazilian where he reached his second doubles final. At the same tournament, he also received a wildcard for the singles qualifying competition.

In March 2025, Soto won three back-to-back Challenger doubles titles in Santiago, Asunción and in Concepción, Chile partnering American Vasil Kirkov. At the last tournament in Chile he also reached the semifinals in singles.

In 2026, Soto made his singles debut for the Davis Cup Chilean team, beating Serbian Branko Đurić at the 2026 Davis Cup Qualifiers first round. The following week, Soto received a wild card for the 2026 Chile Open singles draw, making his singles debut on an ATP tournament, losing to Vilius Gaubas on the first round.

== ATP Tour finals ==
=== Doubles: 2 (2 runner-ups) ===
Legend Grand Slam (–) ATP 1000 (–) ATP 500 (–) ATP 250 (0–2)	Finals by surface Hard (–) Clay (0–2) Grass (–)	Finals by setting Outdoor (0–2) Indoor (–)

Result	W–L	Date	Tournament	Tier	Surface	Partner	Opponents	Score
Loss	0–1	Mar 2023	Chile Open, Chile	ATP 250	Clay	(Brazil) Thiago Seyboth Wild	(Italy) Andrea Pellegrino (Italy) Andrea Vavassori	4–6, 6–3, [10–12]
Loss	0–2	Mar 2024	Chile Open, Chile	ATP 250	Clay	(Brazil) Orlando Luz	(Chile) Tomás Barrios Vera (Chile) Alejandro Tabilo	2–6, 4–6

== ATP Challenger Tour finals ==
=== Singles: 3 (1 title, 2 runner-ups) ===
Legend ATP Challenger Tour (1–2)

Result	W–L	Date	Tournament	Tier	Surface	Opponent	Score
Loss	0–1	Mar 2024	San Luis Open, Mexico	Challenger	Clay	(Colombia) Nicolás Mejía	1–6, 7–5, 2–6
Win	1–1	Mar 2026	Bucaramanga, Colombia	Challenger	Clay	(Argentina) Guido Iván Justo	6–3, 6–3
Loss	1–2	Jul 2026	Open Bogotá, Colombia	Challenger	Clay	(Colombia) Nicolás Mejía	1–6, 5–7

=== Doubles: 17 (14 titles, 3 runner-ups) ===
Legend ATP Challenger Tour (14–3)	Finals by surface Hard (2–0) Clay (12–3)

Result	W–L	Date	Tournament	Tier	Surface	Partner	Opponents	Score
Win	1–0	Jul 2023	Santa Fe Challenger, Argentina	Challenger	Clay	(United States) Vasil Kirkov	(Argentina) Ignacio Monzón (Uruguay) Ignacio Carou	7–6^{(7–3)}, 6–2
Loss	1–1	Sep 2023	Santa Cruz Challenger, Bolivia	Challenger	Clay	(Argentina) Gonzalo Villanueva	(Bolivia) Boris Arias (Bolivia) Federico Zeballos	2–6, 6–4, [7–10]
Win	2–1	Nov 2023	Challenger de Temuco, Chile	Challenger	Hard	(Brazil) Mateus Alves	(United States) Aleksandar Kovacevic (United States) Keegan Smith	6–2, 7–5
Loss	2–2	Jun 2024	Santa Cruz Challenger II, Bolivia	Challenger	Clay	(New Zealand) Finn Reynolds	(Lebanon) Hady Habib (United States) Trey Hilderbrand	6–3, 3–6, [7–10]
Win	3–2	Jun 2024	Ibagué Open, Colombia	Challenger	Clay	(New Zealand) Finn Reynolds	(Argentina) Leonardo Aboian (Argentina) Valerio Aboian	6–4, 4–6, [10–7]
Win	4–2	Aug 2024	Open Bogotá, Colombia	Challenger	Clay	(New Zealand) Finn Reynolds	(Brazil) João Lucas Reis da Silva (Zimbabwe) Benjamin Lock	6–3, 6–4
Win	5–2	Sep 2024	Antofagasta Challenger, Chile	Challenger	Clay	(Brazil) Mateus Alves	(Argentina) Leonardo Aboian (Argentina) Valerio Aboian	6–1, 6–4
Win	6–2	Oct 2024	Curitiba Challenger, Brazil	Challenger	Clay	(Brazil) Fernando Romboli	(Poland) Karol Drzewiecki (Poland) Piotr Matuszewski	7–6^{(7–5)}, 7–6^{(7–4)}
Loss	6–3	Mar 2025	Challenger de Córdoba, Argentina	Challenger	Clay	(Brazil) Fernando Romboli	(Poland) Karol Drzewiecki (Poland) Piotr Matuszewski	4–6, 4–6
Win	7–3	Mar 2025	Challenger de Santiago, Chile	Challenger	Clay	(United States) Vasil Kirkov	(Brazil) Mateus Alves (Brazil) Luis Britto	6–4, 6–3
Win	8–3	Mar 2025	Paraguay Open, Paraguay	Challenger	Clay	(United States) Vasil Kirkov	(Argentina) Guillermo Durán (Argentina) Mariano Kestelboim	6–3, 6–4
Win	9–3	Mar 2025	Challenger Concepción, Chile	Challenger	Clay	(United States) Vasil Kirkov	(Japan) Seita Watanabe (Japan) Takeru Yuzuki	6–2, 6–4
Win	10–3	Jul 2025	Open Castilla y León, Spain	Challenger	Hard	(Bolivia) Federico Zeballos	(France) Arthur Reymond (France) Luca Sanchez	3–6, 7–6^{(7–5)}, [16–14]
Win	11–3	Oct 2025	Curitiba Challenger, Brazil (2)	Challenger	Clay	(Bolivia) Federico Zeballos	(Ecuador) Gonzalo Escobar (Mexico) Miguel Ángel Reyes-Varela	6–4, 7–5
Win	12–3	Mar 2026	Bucaramanga, Colombia	Challenger	Clay	(Colombia) Juan Sebastián Gómez	(Ukraine) Vladyslav Orlov (Colombia) Adrià Soriano Barrera	6–2, 6–4
Win	13–3	Jun 2026	Quito, Ecuador	Challenger	Clay	(Bolivia) Federico Zeballos	(Argentina) Hernán Casanova (Brazil) Pedro Sakamoto	6–1, 6–4
Win	14–3	Jul 2026	Bogotá, Colombia	Challenger	Clay	(Bolivia) Federico Zeballos	(Ecuador) Gonzalo Escobar (Argentina) Facundo Mena	6–4, 2–6, [11–9]

== ITF World Tennis Tour finals ==
=== Singles: 11 (4 titles, 7 runner-ups) ===
Legend ITF WTT (4–7)	Finals by surface Hard (0–2) Clay (4–5)

Result	W–L	Date	Tournament	Tier	Surface	Opponent	Score
Win	1–0	Jun 2022	M15 Quito, Ecuador	WTT	Clay	(Chile) Diego Fernández Flores	6–3, 7–6^{(7–3)}
Loss	1–1	Jul 2022	M15 Cancún, Mexico	WTT	Hard	(France) Enzo Wallart	3–6, 3–6
Win	2–1	Aug 2022	M25 Portoviejo, Ecuador	WTT	Clay	(Brazil) José Pereira	6–3, 7–6^{(7–4)}
Loss	2–2	May 2024	M25 Trelew, Argentina	WTT	Hard	(Japan) Kaichi Uchida	6–4, 1–6, 0–6
Win	3–2	Aug 2024	M25 Arequipa, Peru	WTT	Clay	(Argentina) Guido Iván Justo	6–0, 7–6^{(7–2)}
Loss	3–3	Aug 2024	M25 Arequipa, Peru	WTT	Clay	(Zimbabwe) Benjamin Lock	1–6, 3–6
Win	4–3	Nov 2024	M15 Recife, Brazil	WTT	Clay (i)	(Brazil) Eduardo Ribeiro	6–4, 6–2
Loss	4–4	Nov 2024	M25 São Paulo, Brazil	WTT	Clay	(France) Mathys Erhard	3–6, 3–6
Loss	4–5	Dec 2024	M15 Santiago, Chile	WTT	Clay	(Argentina) Guido Iván Justo	6–0, 6–7^{(3–7)}, 0–6
Loss	4–6	Jan 2026	M25 Santiago, Chile	WTT	Clay	(Argentina) Facundo Mena	4–6, 4–6
Loss	4–7	Jan 2026	M25 Santiago, Chile	WTT	Clay	(France) Sean Cuenin	1–6, 6–7^{(4–7)}

=== Doubles: 9 (4 titles, 5 runner-ups) ===
Legend ITF WTT (4–5)	Finals by surface Hard (1–2) Clay (3–3)

Result	W–L	Date	Tournament	Tier	Surface	Partner	Opponents	Score
Loss	0–1	Jul 2019	M25 Buenos Aires, Argentina	WTT	Clay	(Brazil) Mateus Alves	(Argentina) Maximiliano Estévez (Argentina) Hernán Casanova	3–6, 2–6
Win	1–1	Nov 2020	M15 Fayetteville, US	WTT	Hard	(United Kingdom) Charles Broom	(Canada) Liam Draxl (United States) Aleksandar Kovacevic	2–6, 6–2, [10–5]
Loss	1–2	Jun 2022	M15 Quito, Ecuador	WTT	Clay	(Chile) Diego Fernández Flores	(Colombia) Juan Sebastián Osorio (Colombia) Juan Sebastián Gómez	6–7^{(5–7)}, 6–7^{(2–7)}
Loss	1–3	Aug 2022	M25 Portoviejo, Ecuador	WTT	Clay	(Chile) Miguel Fernando Pereira	(United States) Tristan McCormick (Ecuador) Andrés Andrade	6–7^{(5–7)}, 3–6
Win	2–3	Aug 2023	M15 Arequipa, Peru	WTT	Clay	(Peru) Arklon Huertas del Pino	(Colombia) Juan Sebastián Osorio (Colombia) Nicolás Buitrago	7–5, 6–1
Loss	2–4	Oct 2023	M15 Norman, US	WTT	Hard (i)	(United Kingdom) Mark Whitehouse	(France) Robin Catry (Netherlands) Fons van Sambeek	3–6, 4–6
Loss	2–5	Oct 2023	M15 Fayetteville, US	WTT	Hard	(United Kingdom) Mark Whitehouse	(United States) Axel Nefve (Slovenia) Sebastian Dominko	2–6, 4–6
Win	3–5	Aug 2024	M25 Arequipa, Peru	WTT	Clay	(Colombia) Andrés Urrea	(United States) Pranav Kumar (United States) Noah Schachter	6–3, 7–6^{(7–4)}
Win	4–5	Aug 2024	M25 Arequipa, Peru	WTT	Clay	(Colombia) Andrés Urrea	(United States) Pranav Kumar (United States) Noah Schachter	6–2, 7–6^{(7–5)}
