= Paul Jubb =

British tennis player (born 1999)

- Jubb at the 2026 Wimbledon Championships
- Country (sports): United Kingdom
- Residence: London, England
- Born: 31 October 1999 (age 27) York, North Yorkshire, England
- Height: 1.80 m (5 ft 11 in)
- Turned pro: 2020
- Plays: Right-handed (two-handed backhand)
- College: South Carolina
- Coach: Jaime Pulgar-Garcia
- Prize money: US $691,325

Singles
- Career record: 3–6 (at ATP Tour level, Grand Slam level, and in Davis Cup)
- Career titles: 0
- Highest ranking: No. 180 (28 October 2024)
- Current ranking: No. 440 (5 October 2026)

Grand Slam singles results
- Australian Open: Q1 (2023, 2025)
- French Open: Q2 (2022)
- Wimbledon: 1R (2019, 2022, 2024)
- US Open: Q3 (2022)

Doubles
- Career record: 0–1 (at ATP Tour level, Grand Slam level, and in Davis Cup)
- Career titles: 0
- Highest ranking: No. 1,430 (30 July 2018)
- Current ranking: No. 1,648 (5 October 2026)

Grand Slam doubles results
- Wimbledon: 1R (2019)
- Last updated on: 15 October 2026.

Paul Jubb (born 31 October 1999) is a British tennis player. He has a career high ATP singles ranking of world No. 180, achieved on 28 October 2024. Jubb won the singles title at the 2019 NCAA Division I Men's Tennis Championship as a member of the South Carolina Gamecocks.

== Early years ==
Jubb is the son of an English father and Kenyan mother, both of whom died before he was nine. At the age of four Jubb was spotted playing tennis at Pickering Park near his home in Hull. He was spotted by tennis coach Jonny Carmichael. Carmichael coached Jubb into his teenage years where he trained at the LTA-accredited Nuffield Health Tennis Academy in Hull.

== Career ==
=== 2015: Juniors ===
In 2015 he won the under 16 Boys singles title at the LTA British Nationals.

=== 2019-2022: Grand Slam, ATP and Pro debuts ===
Jubb made his Grand Slam main draw debut at the 2019 Wimbledon Championships after receiving a wildcard for the singles main draw, but dropped out in the first round after losing in 4 sets to João Sousa. He made his ATP Tour debut at the 2019 Eastbourne International by winning two qualifying matches, before losing in the first round to eventual champion Taylor Fritz.

Jubb also received a wildcard for the 2022 Wimbledon Championships but lost in five sets to eventual finalist Nick Kyrgios in the first round.

=== 2024: First ATP semifinal, back to top 200 ===
Ranked No. 289, at the 2024 Mallorca Championships he qualified for the main draw and reached his first ATP semifinal with wins over two qualifiers Maximilian Marterer and Adam Walton, and finally top seed Ben Shelton, for his first top-20 win. As a result he moved close to 90 positions up, back to one position shy of the top 200 and only eight positions from his career-high of No. 193.

He received a wildcard for the main draw of the 2024 Wimbledon Championships.

== ATP Challenger and ITF Futures/World Tennis Tour finals ==
=== Singles: 20 (16–4) ===
Legend (singles) ATP Challenger Tour (1–1) ITF Futures Tour/World Tennis Tour (15–3)	Titles by surface Hard (13–4) Clay (3–0) Grass (0–0) Carpet (0–0)

Result	W–L	Date	Tournament	Tier	Surface	Opponent	Score
Win	1–0	Jul 2018	Lithuania F1, Vilnius	Futures	Clay	(Russia) Denis Klok	6–4, 6–2
Win	2–0	Nov 2019	M15 Cancún, Mexico	World Tennis Tour	Hard	(Brazil) João Lucas Reis da Silva	7–6^{(7–3)}, 6–0
Win	3–0	Feb 2021	M15 Sharm El Sheikh, Egypt	World Tennis Tour	Hard	(Latvia) Mārtiņš Podžus	6–2, 1–6, 6–2
Win	4–0	Apr 2021	M15 Sharm El Sheikh, Egypt	World Tennis Tour	Hard	(India) Sasikumar Mukund	6–2, 6–7^{(8–10)}, 6–4
Win	5–0	Sep 2021	M25 Sintra, Portugal	World Tennis Tour	Hard	(Argentina) Santiago Rodríguez Taverna	7–5, 6–4
Win	6–0	Sep 2021	M25 Sintra, Portugal	World Tennis Tour	Hard	(Spain) Alejandro Moro Cañas	6–0, 6–2
Loss	6–1	Oct 2021	M25 Portimao, Portugal	World Tennis Tour	Hard	(Germany) Sebastian Fanselow	1–6, 7–6^{(7–3)}, 4–6
Win	7–1	Nov 2021	M25 Harlingen, USA	World Tennis Tour	Hard	(Romania) Gabi Adrian Boitan	6–2, 1–6, 7–5
Win	8–1	Mar 2022	Santa Cruz de la Sierra, Bolivia	Challenger	Clay	(Peru) Juan Pablo Varillas	6–3, 7–6^{(7–5)}
Win	9–1	Dec 2023	M15 Ceuta, Spain	World Tennis Tour	Hard	(Spain) Diego Augusto Barreto Sánchez	6–1, 6–2
Loss	9–2	Feb 2024	Glasgow, UK	Challenger	Hard (i)	(France) Clément Chidekh	6–0, 4–6, 1–6
Win	10–2	Apr 2024	M25 Nottingham, Great Britain	World Tennis Tour	Hard	(United Kingdom) Charles Broom	3–6, 6–2, 6–3
Win	11–2	Apr 2025	M25 Santa Margherita di Pula, Italy	World Tennis Tour	Clay	(Italy) Andrea Guerrieri	5–7, 7–6^{(7–2)}, 7–6^{(7–4)}
Win	12–2	Jul 2025	M25 Champaign, United States	World Tennis Tour	Hard	(Jamaica) Blaise Bicknell	6–1, 7–6^{(7–4)}
Loss	12–3	Aug 2025	M25 Roehampton, Great Britain	World Tennis Tour	Hard	(United Kingdom) Oliver Tarvet	4–6, 7–5, 6–1
Win	13–3	Aug 2025	M25 Aldershot, United Kingdom	World Tennis Tour	Hard	(United Kingdom) Toby Samuel	7–6^{(7–4)}, 7–5
Loss	13–4	Feb 2026	M25 Sheffield, United Kingdom	World Tennis Tour	Hard	(United Kingdom) Harry Wendelken	7–6^{(7–5)}, 3–6, 2–6
Win	14–4	Feb 2026	M15 Oberhaching, Germany	World Tennis Tour	Hard	(Germany) Marvin Möller	6–2, 6–0
Win	15–4	Sep 2026	M15 Hurghada, Egypt	World Tennis Tour	Hard	(France) Charles Bertimon	6–1, 6–4
Win	16–4	Oct 2026	M15 Sharm El Sheikh, Egypt	World Tennis Tour	Hard	(Egypt) Fares Zakaria	2–6, 6–4, 6–3
