= Alex Barrena =

Argentine tennis player (born 2002)

- Barrena at the 2026 Wimbledon Championships
- Country (sports): Argentina
- Born: 10 October 2002 (age 23) Buenos Aires, Argentina
- Height: 1.75 m (5 ft 9 in)
- Plays: Right-handed (two-handed backhand)
- Coach: Max Barrena
- Prize money: US $266,001

Singles
- Career record: 0–2
- Career titles: 2 Challenger, 5 ITF
- Highest ranking: No. 167 (30 March 2026)
- Current ranking: No. 247 (22 June 2026)

Grand Slam singles results
- Australian Open: Q1 (2026)
- French Open: Q1 (2026)
- Wimbledon: Q1 (2026)
- US Open: Q1 (2025)

Doubles
- Career record: 0–0
- Career titles: 2 ITF
- Highest ranking: No. 617 (22 August 2022)
- Current ranking: No. 808 (22 June 2026)
- Last updated on: 22 June 2026.

Alex Barrena (born 10 October 2002) is an Argentine tennis player. Barrena has a career high ATP singles ranking of No. 167 achieved on 30 March 2026 and a career high ATP doubles ranking of No. 617 achieved on 22 August 2022.

== Career ==
Barrena has won two ATP Challenger singles titles at the 2025 Challenger Tucumán and the 2025 Bolivia Open in Santa Cruz de la Sierra.

== Performance timeline ==
Key
W	F	SF	QF	#R	RR	Q#	DNQ	A	NH

(W) winner; (F) finalist; (SF) semifinalist; (QF) quarterfinalist; (#R) rounds 4, 3, 2, 1; (RR) round-robin stage; (Q#) qualification round; (DNQ) did not qualify; (A) absent; (NH) not held; (SR) strike rate (events won / competed); (W–L) win–loss record.
To avoid confusion and double counting, these charts are updated at the conclusion of a tournament or when the player's participation has ended.

=== Singles ===
Tournament	2025	2026	SR	W–L	Win %
Grand Slam tournaments
Australian Open	A	Q1	0 / 0	0–0	–
French Open	A		0 / 0	0–0	–
Wimbledon	A		0 / 0	0–0	–
US Open	Q1		0 / 0	0–0	–
Win–loss	0–0	0–0	0 / 0	0–0	–
ATP Masters 1000
Indian Wells Masters	A		0 / 0	0–0	–
Miami Open	A		0 / 0	0–0	–
Monte Carlo Masters	A		0 / 0	0–0	–
Madrid Open	A		0 / 0	0-0	–
Italian Open	A		0 / 0	0–0	–
Canadian Open	A		0 / 0	0–0	–
Cincinnati Masters	A		0 / 0	0–0	–
Shanghai Masters	A		0 / 0	0–0	–
Paris Masters	A		0 / 0	0–0	–
Win–loss	0–0	0–0	0 / 0	0–0	–

== ATP Challenger Tour finals ==
=== Singles: 5 (3 titles, 2 runner-ups) ===
Legend ATP Challenger Tour (3–2)

Result	W–L	Date	Tournament	Tier	Surface	Opponent	Score
Win	1–0	Apr 2025	San Miguel de Tucumán, Argentina	Challenger	Clay	(Argentina) Santiago Rodríguez Taverna	7–5, 6–2
Win	2–0	Jun 2025	Santa Cruz de la Sierra, Bolivia	Challenger	Clay	(Uruguay) Franco Roncadelli	5–7, 7–5, 6–3
Loss	2–1	Sep 2025	Villa María, Argentina	Challenger	Clay	(United States) Emilio Nava	3–6, 3–6
Loss	2–2	Sep 2025	Buenos Aires, Argentina	Challenger	Clay	(Argentina) Román Andrés Burruchaga	6–7^{(4–7)}, 3–6
Win	3–2	Sep 2026	Buenos Aires, Argentina	Challenger	Clay	(Argentina) Facundo Mena	6–4, 6–0
