= Camilo Ugo Carabelli =

Argentine tennis player (born 1999)

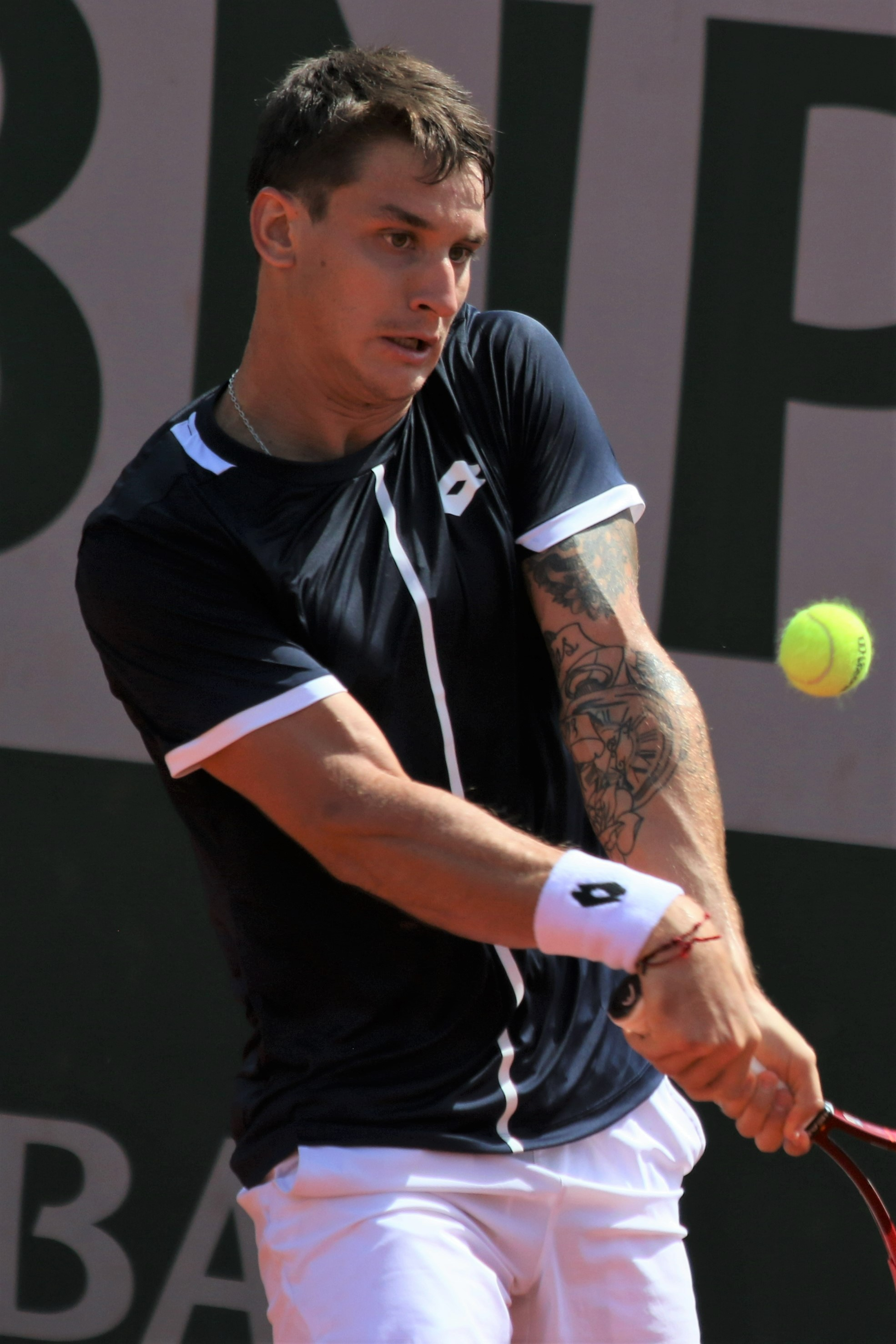
- Ugo Carabelli at the 2022 French Open
- Country (sports): Argentina
- Born: 17 June 1999 (age 27) Buenos Aires, Argentina
- Height: 1.85 m (6 ft 1 in)
- Turned pro: 2016
- Plays: Right-handed (two-handed backhand)
- Coach: Leonardo Olguín, Marcos Massonneau
- Prize money: US $2,739,087

Singles
- Career record: 35–49
- Career titles: 0
- Highest ranking: No. 43 (18 August 2025)
- Current ranking: No. 65 (9 November 2026)

Grand Slam singles results
- Australian Open: 1R (2025, 2026)
- French Open: 2R (2022, 2026)
- Wimbledon: 1R (2025, 2026)
- US Open: 1R (2024, 2025, 2026)

Doubles
- Career record: 6–15
- Career titles: 0
- Highest ranking: No. 187 (20 April 2026)
- Current ranking: No. 188 (13 July 2026)

Grand Slam doubles results
- Australian Open: 3R (2026)
- French Open: 1R (2025)
- Wimbledon: 1R (2025)
- US Open: 3R (2025)
- Last updated on: 15 July 2026.

Camilo Ugo Carabelli (born 17 June 1999) is an Argentine professional tennis player. He has a career-high ATP singles ranking of world No. 43 achieved on 18 August 2025 and a best doubles ranking of No. 187 reached on 20 April 2026. He is currently the No. 5 Argentine singles player.

Ugo Carabelli has won nine ATP Challenger titles in singles.

== Career ==
=== 2022: Slam major debut & first win, top 100 ===
At the 2022 French Open, Ugo Carabelli qualified to make his major main draw debut. He defeated former top-15, world No. 39 Aslan Karatsev in five sets with a fifth set 10 points tiebreak, the first ever match in the French Open main draw since the new tiebreak rule was implemented, in a 4 hours 17 minutes match for his first Grand Slam win. As a result, he made his top 150 debut in the rankings.

Following his third title at the 2022 Lima Challenger where he was the runner-up in 2021, Ugo Carabelli reached the top 100 at world No. 96 on 15 August 2022.

=== 2023–2025: ATP semifinal, top 65, Masters debut & first wins ===
Ugo Carabelli recorded his first ATP win outside of the Grand Slam majors as a qualifier at the 2023 Argentina Open defeating Daniel Elahi Galán. He also qualified for the 2023 Chile Open but lost to Dušan Lajović. Ranked No. 134, he also entered the 2024 Argentina Open main draw as a qualifier and defeated Juan Pablo Varillas in the first round, his second ATP win, to set up a meeting with top seed and world No. 2 Carlos Alcaraz.

Ugo Carabelli was ranked world No. 104 on 18 November 2024 and finished the season inside the top 100 at No. 97 on 2 December 2024.

At the 2025 Rio Open where he entered the main draw as a lucky loser, the Argentine defeated Damir Dzumhur to reach an ATP 500 quarterfinal for the first time. Ugo Carabelli became the eighth lucky loser to make an ATP 500 level semifinal since the series' introduction (2009), defeating lucky loser Jaime Faria, and moved to world No. 69 in the singles rankings on 24 February 2025. The match between him and Faria marked only the second LL vs LL quarterfinal in ATP Tour history (since 1990) after LL Max Purcell defeated LL Andreas Seppi in 2021 Eastbourne. He lost to defending and eventual champion Sebastián Báez in three sets. In the next Golden Swing event, the 2025 Chile Open in Santiago, Carabelli upset seventh seed Nicolás Jarry. Next he defeated Thiago Monteiro and Federico Coria to reach back-to-back semifinals. As a result, he reached the top 65 in the rankings. At the 2025 Miami Open where he entered the main draw as a lucky loser on his debut at the 1000-level, Carabelli recorded his first two Masters wins and also first two on hardcourts, over American qualifier Brandon Holt and then Alex Michelsen.

== Performance timeline ==
Key
W	F	SF	QF	#R	RR	Q#	DNQ	A	NH

(W) winner; (F) finalist; (SF) semifinalist; (QF) quarterfinalist; (#R) rounds 4, 3, 2, 1; (RR) round-robin stage; (Q#) qualification round; (DNQ) did not qualify; (A) absent; (NH) not held; (SR) strike rate (events won / competed); (W–L) win–loss record.
To avoid confusion and double counting, these charts are updated at the conclusion of a tournament or when the player's participation has ended.

=== Singles ===
Current through the 2026 French Open.

Tournament	2022	2023	2024	2025	2026	SR	W–L	Win %
Grand Slam tournaments
Australian Open	Q1	A	Q3	1R	1R	0 / 2	0–2	0%
French Open	2R	Q3	Q1	1R	2R	0 / 3	2–3	40%
Wimbledon	Q1	A	Q1	1R		0 / 1	0–1	0%
US Open	Q1	Q1	1R	1R		0 / 2	0–2	0%
Win–loss	1–1	0–0	0–1	0–4	1–2	0 / 8	2–8	20%
ATP 1000 tournaments
Indian Wells Open	A	A	A	A	2R	0 / 1	1–1	50%
Miami Open	A	Q1	A	3R	2R	0 / 2	3–2	60%
Monte-Carlo Masters	A	A	A	1R	A	0 / 1	0–1	0%
Madrid Open	A	A	Q2	1R	2R	0 / 2	1–2	33%
Italian Open	A	Q1	Q1	2R	1R	0 / 2	1–2	33%
Canadian Open	A	A	Q1	1R		0 / 1	0–1	0%
Cincinnati Open	A	A	A	2R		0 / 1	1–1	50%
Shanghai Masters	NH	A	A	2R		0 / 1	1–1	50%
Paris Masters	A	A	A	2R		0 / 1	1–1	50%
Win–loss	0–0	0–0	0–0	6–8	3–4	0 / 12	9–12	43%

== ATP Challenger Tour finals ==
=== Singles: 18 (10 titles, 8 runner-ups) ===
Legend ATP Challenger Tour (10–8)	Finals by surface Hard (0–1) Clay (10–7)

Result	W–L	Date	Tournament	Tier	Surface	Opponent	Score
Win	1–0	Aug 2021	Polish Cup, Poland	Challenger	Clay	(Croatia) Nino Serdarušić	6–4, 6–2
Loss	1–1	Oct 2021	Lima Challenger, Peru	Challenger	Clay	(Bolivia) Hugo Dellien	3–6, 5–7
Loss	1–2	Jan 2022	Santa Cruz Challenger, Bolivia	Challenger	Clay	(Argentina) Francisco Cerúndolo	4–6, 3–6
Win	2–2	Apr 2022	Tigre II Challenger, Argentina	Challenger	Clay	(Argentina) Andrea Collarini	7–5, 6–2
Win	3–2	Aug 2022	Lima Challenger, Peru	Challenger	Clay	(Argentina) Thiago Agustín Tirante	6–2, 7–6^{(7–4)}
Loss	3–3	Oct 2022	Buenos Aires Challenger, Argentina	Challenger	Clay	(Argentina) Juan Manuel Cerúndolo	4–6, 6–2, 5–7
Loss	3–4	Aug 2023	Meerbusch Challenger, Germany	Challenger	Clay	(United Kingdom) Jan Choinski	4–6, 0–6
Win	4–4	Sep 2023	Antofagasta Challenger, Chile	Challenger	Clay	(United States) Tristan Boyer	3–6, 6–1, 7–5
Loss	4–5	Oct 2023	Campinas International, Brazil	Challenger	Clay	(Brazil) Thiago Monteiro	6–3, 4–6, 4–6
Win	5–5	Feb 2024	Brasil Tennis Challenger, Brazil	Challenger	Clay	(Argentina) Federico Coria	7–5, 6–4
Win	6–5	Mar 2024	Santa Cruz Challenger, Bolivia	Challenger	Clay	(Bolivia) Murkel Dellien	6–4, 6–2
Loss	6–6	Jun 2024	Poznań Open, Poland	Challenger	Clay	(Poland) Maks Kaśnikowski	6–3, 4–6, 3–6
Loss	6–7	Jul 2024	Karlsruhe Open, Germany	Challenger	Clay	(Slovakia) Jozef Kovalik	3–6, 6–7^{(2–7)}
Win	7–7	Oct 2024	Villa María Challenger, Argentina	Challenger	Clay	(Netherlands) Jesper de Jong	7–6^{(7–3)}, 3–6, 6–4
Loss	7–8	Dec 2024	Temuco Challenger, Chile	Challenger	Hard	(Lebanon) Hady Habib	4–6, 7–6^{(7–3)}, 6–7^{(2–7)}
Win	8–8	Feb 2025	Rosario Challenger, Argentina	Challenger	Clay	(Bolivia) Hugo Dellien	3–6, 6–3, 6–2
Win	9–8	Feb 2026	Rosario Challenger, Argentina (2)	Challenger	Clay	(Argentina) Román Andrés Burruchaga	6–2, 6–3
Win	10–8	Nov 2026	Costa do Sauípe Open, Brazil	Challenger	Clay	(Brazil) Thiago Seyboth Wild	6–2, 7–5

=== Doubles: 3 (3 runner-ups) ===
Legend ATP Challenger Tour (0–3)

Result	W–L	Date	Tournament	Tier	Surface	Partner	Opponents	Score
Loss	0–1	Jun 2021	Forlì International, Italy	Challenger	Clay	(Argentina) Pedro Cachín	(Peru) Sergio Galdós (Brazil) Orlando Luz	5–7, 6–2, [8–10]
Loss	0–2	Jan 2022	Concepción Challenger, Chile	Challenger	Clay	(Argentina) Francisco Cerúndolo	(Ecuador) Diego Hidalgo (Colombia) Cristian Rodríguez	2–6, 0–6
Loss	0–3	Aug 2022	Lima Challenger, Peru	Challenger	Clay	(Brazil) Orlando Luz	(Uruguay) Ignacio Carou (Argentina) Facundo Mena	2–6, 2–6

== ITF Tour finals ==
=== Singles: 11 (4 titles, 7 runner-ups) ===
Legend ITF Futures/WTT (4–7)	Finals by surface Hard (0–2) Clay (4–5)

Result	W–L	Date	Tournament	Tier	Surface	Opponent	Score
Loss	0–1	Apr 2018	F1 São José do Rio Preto, Brazil	Futures	Clay	(Brazil) Thiago Seyboth Wild	6–7^{(5–7)}, 3–6
Loss	0–2	May 2018	F1 Villa del Dique, Argentina	Futures	Clay	(Argentina) Facundo Argüello	6–3, 4–6, 4–6
Win	1–2	May 2018	F2 Villa María, Argentina	Futures	Clay	(Chile) Juan Carlos Sáez	7–6^{(7–5)}, 6–3
Win	2–2	Jul 2018	F19 Gubbio, Italy	Futures	Clay	(Argentina) Genaro Alberto Olivieri	6–7^{(1–7)}, 6–1, 6–2
Loss	2–3	Jul 2018	F20 Pontedera, Italy	Futures	Clay	(Italy) Riccardo Balzerani	walkover
Win	3–3	Sep 2018	F5 Villa del Dique, Argentina	Futures	Clay	(Peru) Nicolás Álvarez	6–2, 7–6^{(7–1)}
Loss	3–4	May 2019	M15 Cancún, Mexico	WTT	Hard	(Croatia) Matija Pecotić	2–6, 1–6
Loss	3–5	Aug 2019	M25 Vogau, Austria	WTT	Clay	(Czech Republic) Jonáš Forejtek	6–7^{(7–9)}, 6–4, 4–6
Loss	3–6	Dec 2019	M15 Santo Domingo, Dominican Republic	WTT	Hard	(United Kingdom) Jan Choinski	0–6, 0–6
Win	4–6	Mar 2020	M25 Río Cuarto, Argentina	WTT	Clay	(Argentina) Tomás Martín Etcheverry	7–6^{(11–9)}, 6–2
Loss	4–7	Apr 2021	M15 Villa María, Argentina	WTT	Clay	(Argentina) Nicolás Kicker	3–6, 4–6
