= Santa Cruz Challenger =

Bolivia Open
- 2025 Santa Cruz Challenger

ATP Challenger Tour
- Event name: Bolivia Open
- Location: Santa Cruz de la Sierra, Bolivia
- Venue: Club de Tenis Santa Cruz (2022-), Las Palmas Country Club (2024)
- Category: ATP Challenger 75 (2023-2024), Challenger 50 (2025-)
- Surface: Clay
- Draw: 32S/24Q/16D
- Prize money: $60,000

Current champions (2026)
- Singles: (Bolivia) Hugo Dellien
- Doubles: (Argentina) Hernán Casanova (Argentina) Santiago Rodríguez Taverna

The Bolivia Open (formerly Dove+Men Care Bolivia Open), is a professional tennis tournament played on clay courts. It is currently part of the ATP Challenger Tour and is held annually in Santa Cruz de la Sierra, Bolivia since 2022. In 2023 and in 2024, the tournament received the ATP Challenger "Best of South America" award. In 2025 it was elected as the “ATP Challenger 50 Tournament of the Year”.

In 2022 it was part of the Legión Sudamericana as an ATP Challenger 80. It was scheduled to be part of the 2021 Legión Sudamericana but was temporarily suspended due to COVID-19.

== Past finals ==
=== Singles ===
Year	Champion	Runner-up	Score
2026 (2)	(Brazil) Thiago Seyboth Wild	(Bolivia) Hugo Dellien	6–4, 6–3
2026 (1)	(Bolivia) Hugo Dellien	(Bolivia) Juan Carlos Prado Ángelo	6–4, 7–5
2025	(Argentina) Alex Barrena	(Uruguay) Franco Roncadelli	5–7, 7–5, 6–3
2024 (2)	(Argentina) Juan Manuel Cerúndolo	(Ecuador) Álvaro Guillén Meza	3–6, 6–1, 6–4
2024 (1)	(Argentina) Camilo Ugo Carabelli	(Bolivia) Murkel Dellien	6–4, 6–2
2023	(Argentina) Mariano Navone	(Argentina) Francisco Comesaña	4–6, 7–5, 6–1
2022 (2)	(United Kingdom) Paul Jubb	(Peru) Juan Pablo Varillas	6–3, 7–6^{(7–5)}
2022 (1)	(Argentina) Francisco Cerúndolo	(Argentina) Camilo Ugo Carabelli	6–4, 6–3

=== Doubles ===
Year	Champions	Runners-up	Score
2026 (2)	(Ecuador) Diego Hidalgo (Argentina) Mariano Kestelboim	(Brazil) Guto Miguel (Brazil) Eduardo Ribeiro	1–6, 6–4, [10–8]
2026 (1)	(Argentina) Hernán Casanova (Argentina) Santiago Rodríguez Taverna	(Argentina) Mariano Kestelboim (Bolivia) Federico Zeballos	7–5, 6–4
2025	(Argentina) Mariano Kestelboim (Argentina) Gonzalo Villanueva	(Bolivia) Boris Arias (Bolivia) Federico Zeballos	6–3, 6–2
2024 (2)	(Lebanon) Hady Habib (United States) Trey Hilderbrand	(New Zealand) Finn Reynolds (Chile) Matías Soto	3–6, 6–3, [10–7]
2024 (1)	(Argentina) Andrea Collarini (Argentina) Renzo Olivo	(Bolivia) Hugo Dellien (Bolivia) Murkel Dellien	6–4, 6–1
2023	(Bolivia) Boris Arias (Bolivia) Federico Zeballos	(Chile) Matías Soto (Argentina) Gonzalo Villanueva	6–2, 4–6, [10–7]
2022 (2)	(Netherlands) Jesper de Jong (Netherlands) Bart Stevens	(Colombia) Nicolás Barrientos (Mexico) Miguel Ángel Reyes-Varela	6–4, 3–6, [10–6]
2022 (1)	(Ecuador) Diego Hidalgo (Colombia) Cristian Rodríguez	(Slovakia) Andrej Martin (Austria) Tristan-Samuel Weissborn	4–6, 6–3, [10–8]
