= Mariano Kestelboim =

Argentine tennis player (born 1996)

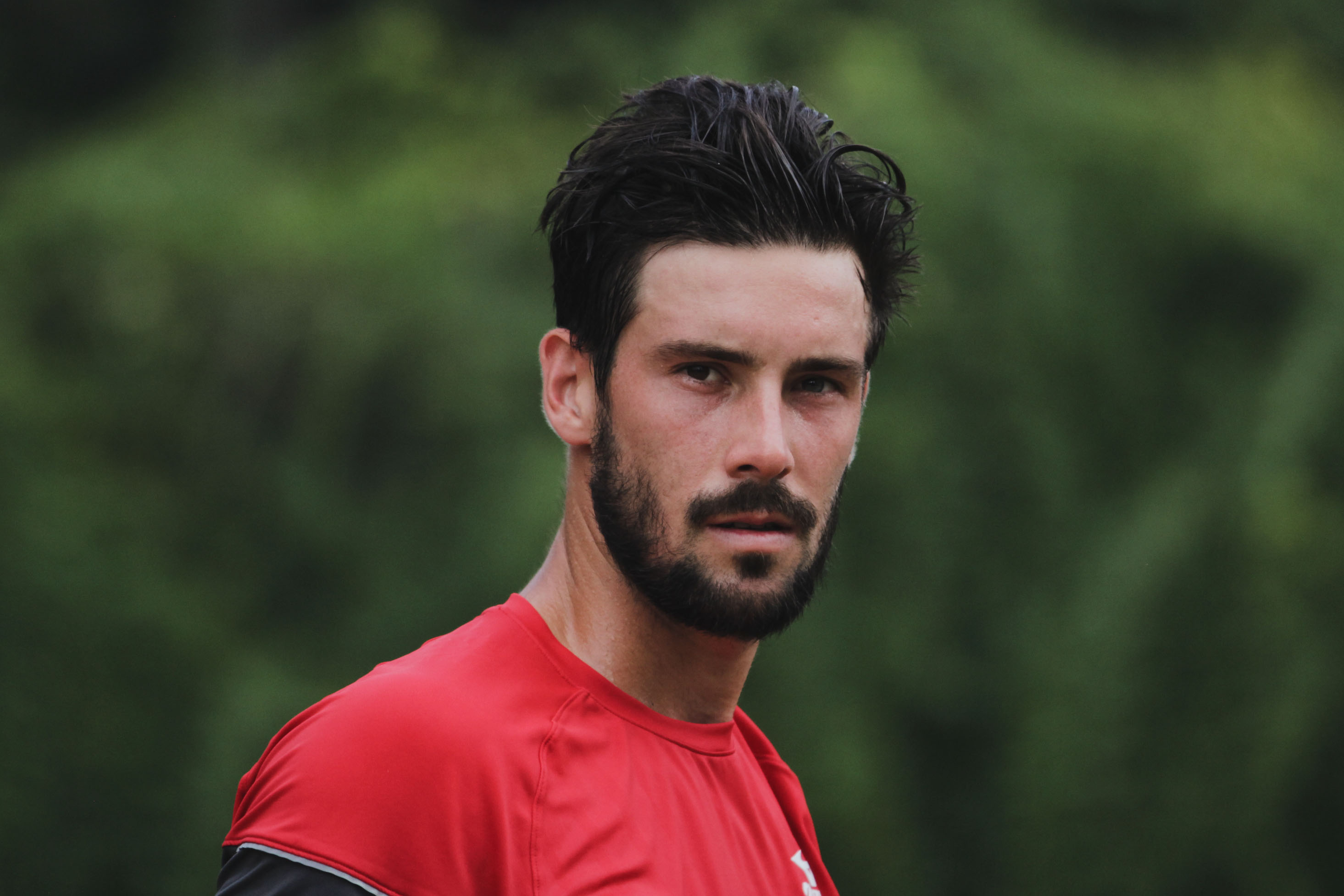
- Kestelboim in 2021
- Country (sports): Argentina
- Born: 6 February 1996 (age 30) Buenos Aires, Argentina
- Height: 1.85 m (6 ft 1 in)
- Plays: Right-handed (two-handed backhand)
- Coach: Marcos Massonneau, Gastón Etlis
- Prize money: US $303,211

Singles
- Career record: 0–0 (at ATP Tour level, Grand Slam level, and in Davis Cup)
- Career titles: 5 ITF
- Highest ranking: No. 387 (18 September 2017)
- Current ranking: No. 1,396 (9 November 2026)

Doubles
- Career record: 2–7 (at ATP Tour level, Grand Slam level, and in Davis Cup)
- Career titles: 10 Challenger, 32 ITF
- Highest ranking: No. 88 (9 November 2026)
- Current ranking: No. 88 (9 November 2026)

Grand Slam doubles results
- French Open: 1R (2026)
- Wimbledon: 1R (2026)
- US Open: 1R (2026)
- Last updated on: 9 November 2026.

Mariano Kestelboim (born 6 February 1996) is an Argentine tennis player. He has a career high ATP doubles ranking of world No. 88 achieved on 9 November 2026 and a career high singles ranking of No. 387 achieved on 18 September 2017.

== Career ==
Kestelboim won his maiden ATP Challenger title at the 2025 Challenger de Tigre in doubles partnering Gonzalo Villanueva.
