= Juan Carlos Prado Ángelo =

Bolivian tennis player (born 2005)

- Prado Ángelo at the 2026 Wimbledon Championships
- Country (sports): Bolivia
- Born: 6 March 2005 (age 21) Santa Cruz de la Sierra, Bolivia
- Height: 1.83 m (6 ft 0 in)
- Plays: Right-handed (two-handed backhand)
- Coach: Hermann Ritter
- Prize money: US $364,074

Singles
- Career record: 3–5 (at ATP Tour level, Grand Slam level, and in Davis Cup)
- Career titles: 1 Challenger
- Highest ranking: No. 151 (3 August 2026)
- Current ranking: No. 182 (9 November 2026)

Grand Slam singles results
- Australian Open: Q1 (2026)
- French Open: 1R (2026)
- Wimbledon: Q1 (2026)
- US Open: Q1 (2026)

Doubles
- Career record: 0–0 (at ATP Tour level, Grand Slam level, and in Davis Cup)
- Career titles: 3 Challengers
- Highest ranking: No. 331 (23 February 2026)
- Current ranking: No. 720 (3 August 2026)
- Last updated on: 9 November 2026.

Juan Carlos Prado Ángelo (born 6 March 2005) is a Bolivian professional tennis player. He has a career-high ATP singles ranking of No. 151 achieved on 3 August 2026 and a doubles ranking of No. 331 achieved on 23 February 2026. He is currently the No. 1 singles player from Bolivia.

Prado Ángelo was a major finalist at the 2023 Junior French Open, becoming the first Bolivian in history to reach a Grand Slam junior singles final. He reached an ITF junior combined ranking of world No. 1 on 10 July 2023.

Prado Ángelo represents Bolivia at the Davis Cup, where he has a W/L record of 0–2.

== Career ==
=== 2023: French Open Junior finalist ===
Prado Ángelo reached the final of the boys' singles tournament at the 2023 French Open, becoming the first Bolivian in history to reach a junior Grand Slam singles final. He lost in straight sets in the final, 1–6, 4–6, to Croatian Dino Prižmić.

=== 2025: Maiden Challenger singles title ===
In June 2025, Prado Ángelo won his first ATP Challenger singles title in Lima.

=== 2026: Major & top 200 debuts, Bolivian No. 1 ===
Ranked at a career-high of world No. 176, Prado Ángelo made his Grand Slam debut at the 2026 French Open after qualifying for the main draw.

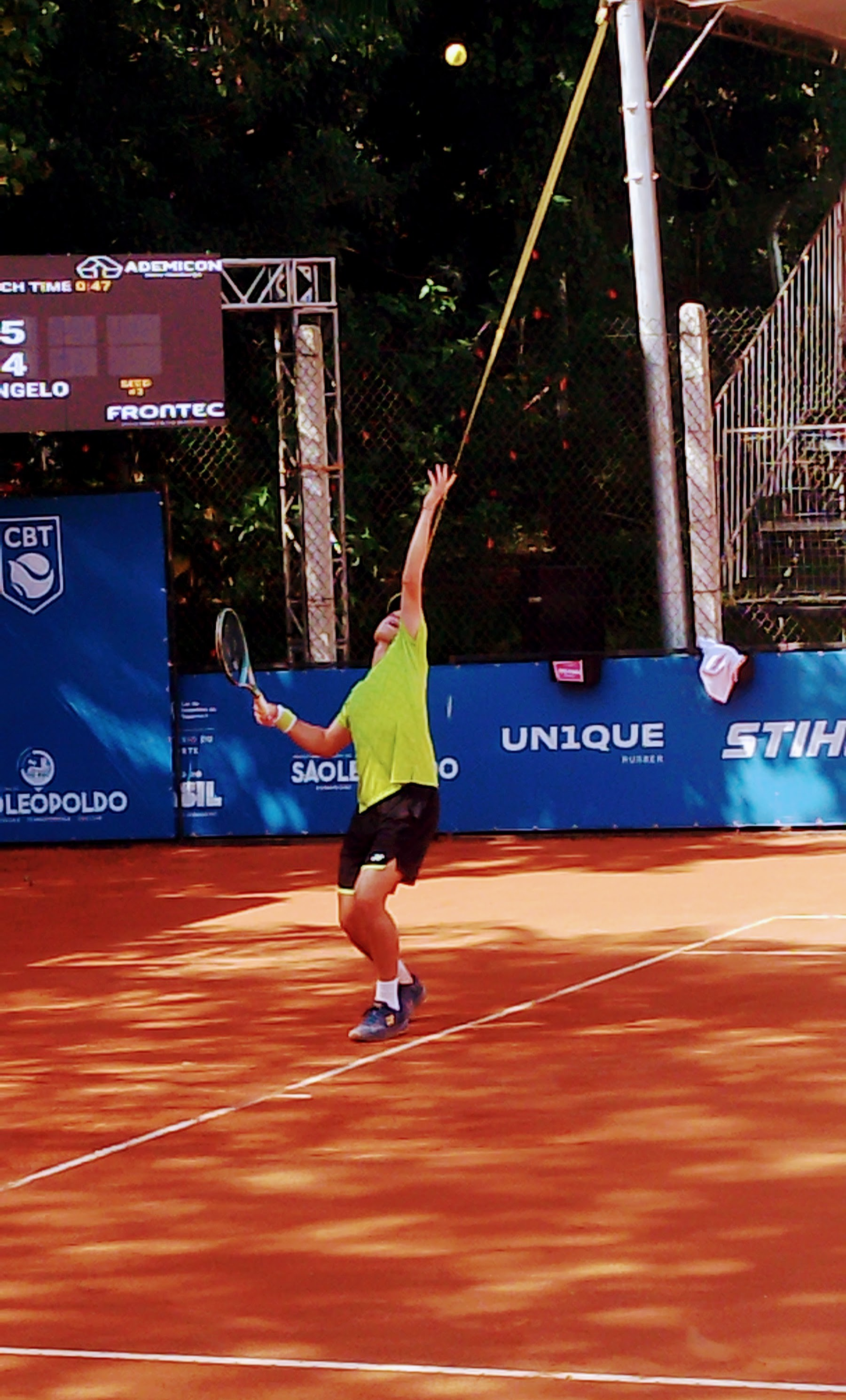
Prado Angelo at the 2026 São Léo Open

== Performance timeline ==
Key
W	F	SF	QF	#R	RR	Q#	DNQ	A	NH

(W) winner; (F) finalist; (SF) semifinalist; (QF) quarterfinalist; (#R) rounds 4, 3, 2, 1; (RR) round-robin stage; (Q#) qualification round; (DNQ) did not qualify; (A) absent; (NH) not held; (SR) strike rate (events won / competed); (W–L) win–loss record.
To avoid confusion and double counting, these charts are updated at the conclusion of a tournament or when the player's participation has ended.

=== Singles ===
Tournament	2026	SR	W–L	Win %
Grand Slam tournaments
Australian Open	Q1	0 / 0	0–0	–
French Open		0 / 0	0–0	–
Wimbledon		0 / 0	0–0	–
US Open		0 / 0	0–0	–
Win–loss	0–0	0 / 0	0–0	–
ATP Masters 1000
Indian Wells Masters		0 / 0	0–0	–
Miami Open		0 / 0	0–0	–
Monte Carlo Masters		0 / 0	0–0	–
Madrid Open		0 / 0	0-0	–
Italian Open		0 / 0	0–0	–
Canadian Open		0 / 0	0–0	–
Cincinnati Masters		0 / 0	0–0	–
Shanghai Masters		0 / 0	0–0	–
Paris Masters		0 / 0	0–0	–
Win–loss	0–0	0 / 0	0–0	–

== ATP Challenger Tour finals ==
=== Singles: 3 (1 title, 2 runner-ups) ===
Legend ATP Challenger Tour (1–2)

Result	W–L	Date	Tournament	Tier	Surface	Opponent	Score
Win	1–0	Jun 2025	Lima Challenger, Peru	Challenger	Clay	(Peru) Gonzalo Bueno	6–4, 7–5
Loss	1–1	Oct 2025	Cali Open, Colombia	Challenger	Clay	(Chile) Tomás Barrios Vera	1–6, 4–6
Loss	1–2	Apr 2026	Santa Cruz Challenger, Bolivia	Challenger	Clay	(Bolivia) Hugo Dellien	4–6, 5–7

=== Doubles: 3 (3 titles) ===
Legend ATP Challenger Tour (3–0)

Result	W–L	Date	Tournament	Tier	Surface	Partner	Opponents	Score
Win	1–0	Mar 2025	Crete Challenger, Greece	Challenger	Hard	(United Kingdom) Mark Whitehouse	(Austria) Dennis Novak (Hungary) Zsombor Piros	7–6^{(9–7)}, 6–2
Win	2–0	Apr 2025	Brasil Tennis Open, Brazil	Challenger	Clay	(Bolivia) Federico Zeballos	(Argentina) Lautaro Midón (Argentina) Gonzalo Villanueva	7–5, 7–5
Win	3–0	Feb 2026	Challenger de Tigre, Argentina	Challenger	Clay	(Argentina) Mariano Kestelboim	(Argentina) Santiago Rodríguez Taverna (Argentina) Gonzalo Villanueva	6–4, 5–7, [10–7]

== ITF World Tennis Tour finals ==
=== Singles: 5 (5 titles) ===
Legend ITF WTT (5–0)	Finals by surface Hard (1–0) Clay (4–0)

Result	W–L	Date	Tournament	Tier	Surface	Opponent	Score
Win	1–0	Oct 2022	M15 Cochabamba, Bolivia	WTT	Clay	(Italy) Davide Pontoglio	6–2, 3–6, 6–2
Win	2–0	Nov 2023	M15 Rosario, Argentina	WTT	Clay	(Argentina) Lorenzo Joaquín Rodríguez	6–3, 4–6, 7–6^{(9–7)}
Win	3–0	Nov 2023	M15 Santa Cruz, Bolivia	WTT	Clay	(Brazil) Igor Gimenez	6–3, 7–5
Win	4–0	Aug 2024	M25 Belém, Brazil	WTT	Hard	(Brazil) Eduardo Ribeiro	6–4, 6–3
Win	5–0	Sep 2024	M25 Luque, Paraguay	WTT	Clay	(Brazil) Daniel Dutra da Silva	6–2, 2–6, 7–6^{(8–6)}

=== Doubles: 3 (1 title, 2 runner-ups) ===
Legend ITF WTT (1–2)

Result	W–L	Date	Tournament	Tier	Surface	Partner	Opponents	Score
Win	1–0	Oct 2022	M15 Cochabamba, Bolivia	WTT	Clay	(Bolivia) Alejandro Mendoza	(Italy) Davide Pontoglio (Italy) Alessio Zanotti	6–4, 6–2
Loss	1–1	Oct 2023	M25 Mendoza, Argentina	WTT	Clay	(Peru) Ignacio Buse	(Peru) Arklon Huertas del Pino (Peru) Conner Huertas del Pino	4–6, 4–6
Loss	1–2	Nov 2023	M15 Rosario, Argentina	WTT	Clay	(Argentina) Mariano Kestelboim	(Argentina) Juan Manuel La Serna (Argentina) Mateo del Pino	3–6, 6–7^{(1–7)}

== Junior Grand Slam finals ==
=== Singles: 1 (runner-up) ===
Result	Year	Tournament	Surface	Opponent	Score
Loss	2023	French Open	Clay	(Croatia) Dino Prižmić	1–6, 4–6

=== Doubles: 1 (runner-up) ===
Result	Year	Tournament	Surface	Partner	Opponents	Score
Loss	2022	US Open	Hard	(Switzerland) Dylan Dietrich	(United States) Ozan Baris (United States) Nishesh Basavareddy	1–6, 1–6
