= 2025 Challenger Concepción =

- Date: 24–30 March
- Edition: 5th
- Surface: Clay
- Location: Concepción, Chile

Champions

Singles
- (United States) Emilio Nava

Doubles
- (United States) Vasil Kirkov / (Chile) Matías Soto
← 2024 ·	Challenger Concepción	· 2026 →

The 2025 Challenger Concepción was a professional tennis tournament played on clay courts. It was the fifth edition of the tournament which was part of the 2025 ATP Challenger Tour. It took place in Concepción, Chile between 24 and 30 March 2025.

== Singles main-draw entrants ==
=== Seeds ===
Country	Player	Rank^{1}	Seed
~~BRA~~	~~Thiago Monteiro~~	~~99~~	~~1~~
COL	Daniel Elahi Galán	110	2
ARG	Román Andrés Burruchaga	137	3
CHI	Tomás Barrios Vera	149	4
ARG	Facundo Mena	186	5
PAR	Daniel Vallejo	187	6
ARG	Andrea Collarini	198	7
USA	Emilio Nava	235	8

- ^{1} Rankings are as of 17 March 2025.

=== Other entrants ===
The following players received wildcards into the singles main draw:

- (Germany) Diego Dedura-Palomero
- (Brazil) ~~Thiago Monteiro~~
- (Chile) Nicolás Villalón

The following player received entry into the singles main draw as an alternate:

- (Argentina) Gonzalo Villanueva

The following players received entry from the qualifying draw:

- (Argentina) Valerio Aboian
- (Brazil) Pedro Boscardin Dias
- (Peru) Conner Huertas del Pino
- (Argentina) Nicolás Kicker
- (Ukraine) Vladyslav Orlov
- (Brazil) José Pereira

The following player received entry as a lucky loser:

- (Japan) Yuki Mochizuki

== Champions ==
=== Singles ===
- (United States) Emilio Nava def. (Argentina) Nicolás Kicker 6–1, 7–6^{(7–3)}.

=== Doubles ===
- (United States) Vasil Kirkov / (Chile) Matías Soto def. (Japan) Seita Watanabe / (Japan) Takeru Yuzuki 6–2, 6–4.
