= 2022 Challenger Concepción – Singles =

Singles
- 2022 Challenger Concepción

Final
- Champion: (Colombia) Daniel Elahi Galán
- Runner-up: (Argentina) Santiago Rodríguez Taverna
- Score: 6–1, 3–6, 6–3

Events
Singles	Doubles
← 2021 ·	Challenger Concepción	· 2023 →

Sebastián Báez was the defending champion but chose not to participate.

Daniel Elahi Galán won the title after defeating Santiago Rodríguez Taverna 6–1, 3–6, 6–3 in the final.

== Seeds ==
1. (Bolivia) Hugo Dellien (semifinals)
2. (Slovakia) Andrej Martin (first round)
3. (Colombia) Daniel Elahi Galán (champion)
4. (Argentina) Francisco Cerúndolo (quarterfinals)
5. (Argentina) Renzo Olivo (first round)
6. (Argentina) Facundo Mena (quarterfinals)
7. (Argentina) Camilo Ugo Carabelli (quarterfinals)
8. (Argentina) Santiago Rodríguez Taverna (final)

== Draw ==
=== Key ===
- Q = Qualifier
- WC = Wild card
- LL = Lucky loser
- Alt = Alternate
- SE = Special exempt
- PR = Protected ranking
- ITF = ITF entry
- JE = Junior exempt
- w/o = Walkover
- r = Retired
- d = Defaulted
- SR = Special ranking

=== Finals ===
Semifinals
1/WC	(Bolivia) Hugo Dellien	4	6	6^{3}
3	(Colombia) Daniel Elahi Galán	6	2	7^{7}
8	(Argentina) Santiago Rodríguez Taverna	6	6
(Chile) Gonzalo Lama	3	4

Final
3	(Colombia) Daniel Elahi Galán	6	3	6
8	(Argentina) Santiago Rodríguez Taverna	1	6	3

=== Top half ===
First round
1/WC	(Bolivia) H Dellien	6	6
Q	(Chile) Cristóbal Castro	0	1
Q	(Chile) Ignacio Becerra	2	0
Alt	(United States) S Kirchheimer	6	6
WC	(Chile) Benjamín Torres	1	1
Alt	(France) Quentin Folliot	6	6
(Brazil) P Sakamoto	6	6
5	(Argentina) R Olivo	1	1
3	(Colombia) DE Galán	6	6
Q	(Peru) A Merino	0	1
Q	(Mexico) MÁ Reyes-Varela	4	2
(United States) N Moreno de Alboran	6	6
(United States) N Rubin	6	6
Q	(Chile) Víctor Núñez	2	2
Alt	(Chile) Gonzalo Achondo	0	0
7	(Argentina) C Ugo Carabelli	6	6

Second round
1/WC	(Bolivia) H Dellien	6	6
Alt	(United States) S Kirchheimer	0	1
Alt	(France) Q Folliot	4	3
(Brazil) P Sakamoto	6	6
3	(Colombia) DE Galán	4	6	6
(United States) N Moreno de Alboran	6	1	2
(United States) N Rubin	2	2
7	(Argentina) C Ugo Carabelli	6	6

Quarterfinals
1/WC	(Bolivia) H Dellien	6	6
(Brazil) P Sakamoto	2	4
3	(Colombia) DE Galán	6	6
7	(Argentina) C Ugo Carabelli	1	2

Semifinals
1/WC	(Bolivia) H Dellien	4	6	6^{3}
3	(Colombia) DE Galán	6	2	7^{7}

=== Bottom half ===
First round
8	(Argentina) S Rodríguez Taverna	6	6
Alt	(Brazil) Wilson Leite	1	3
(Peru) N Álvarez	4	7^{7}	6
Alt	(Ecuador) D Hidalgo	6	6^{5}	4
Alt	(Argentina) MF Descotte	6	6
Q	(Chile) Felipe Hernández	0	0
(Brazil) D Dutra da Silva	5	3
4/WC	(Argentina) F Cerúndolo	7	6
6	(Argentina) F Mena	6	4	6
(Spain) C Gómez-Herrera	3	6	4
Alt	(Argentina) RA Burruchaga
Alt	(Colombia) C Rodríguez	w/o
Alt	(Chile) Michel Vernier	2	2
(Chile) G Lama	6	6
(Argentina) G Villanueva	6	6
2	(Slovakia) A Martin	2	3

Second round
8	(Argentina) S Rodríguez Taverna	6	7^{7}
(Peru) N Álvarez	3	6^{5}
Alt	(Argentina) MF Descotte	3	4
4/WC	(Argentina) F Cerúndolo	6	6
6	(Argentina) F Mena	6	6
Alt	(Colombia) C Rodríguez	2	4
(Chile) G Lama	2	6	6
(Argentina) G Villanueva	6	4	4

Quarterfinals
8	(Argentina) S Rodríguez Taverna	6	7^{7}
4/WC	(Argentina) F Cerúndolo	3	6^{1}
6	(Argentina) F Mena	1	6	2
(Chile) G Lama	6	2	6

Semifinals
8	(Argentina) S Rodríguez Taverna	6	6
(Chile) G Lama	3	4
