= 2023 Challenger Concepción – Doubles =

Doubles
- 2023 Challenger Concepción

Final
- Champions: (Argentina) Guido Andreozzi (Argentina) Guillermo Durán
- Runners-up: (Italy) Luciano Darderi (Ukraine) Oleg Prihodko
- Score: 7–6^{(7–1)}, 6–7^{(3–7)}, [10–7]

Events
Singles	Doubles
← 2022 ·	Challenger Concepción	· 2024 →

Diego Hidalgo and Cristian Rodríguez were the defending champions but only Rodríguez chose to defend his title, partnering Luis David Martínez. Rodríguez lost in the first round to Hugo and Murkel Dellien.

Guido Andreozzi and Guillermo Durán won the title after defeating Luciano Darderi and Oleg Prihodko 7–6^{(7–1)}, 6–7^{(3–7)}, [10–7] in the final.

== Seeds ==
1. (Venezuela) Luis David Martínez / (Colombia) Cristian Rodríguez (first round)
2. (Argentina) Guido Andreozzi / (Argentina) Guillermo Durán (champions)
3. (Italy) Luciano Darderi / (Ukraine) Oleg Prihodko (final)
4. (Poland) Karol Drzewiecki / (Poland) Piotr Matuszewski (semifinals)

== Draw ==
=== Key ===
- Q = Qualifier
- WC = Wild card
- LL = Lucky loser
- Alt = Alternate
- SE = Special exempt
- PR = Protected ranking
- ITF = ITF entry
- JE = Junior exempt
- w/o = Walkover
- r = Retired
- d = Defaulted
- SR = Special ranking

First round
1	(Venezuela) LD Martínez (Colombia) C Rodríguez	6^{4}	3
(Bolivia) H Dellien (Bolivia) M Dellien	7^{7}	6
(Bolivia) B Arias (Bolivia) F Zeballos	7	6
WC	(Chile) Alejandro Bancalari (Chile) Benjamín Herrera	5	2
3	(Italy) L Darderi (Ukraine) O Prihodko	6	2	[10]
(Spain) O Roca Batalla (Kazakhstan) T Skatov	1	6	[5]
(Italy) F Agamenone (Argentina) F Díaz Acosta	6	6
(Argentina) JP Ficovich (Argentina) GA Olivieri	0	1
WC	(Chile) Esteban Bruna (Argentina) N Kicker	6	3	[7]
(Argentina) F Coria (Argentina) C Ugo Carabelli	3	6	[10]
(Argentina) TA Tirante (Argentina) JB Torres	4	3
4	(Poland) K Drzewiecki (Poland) P Matuszewski	6	6
(Argentina) A Collarini (Argentina) R Olivo	6	2	[7]
(Argentina) H Casanova (Brazil) D Dutra da Silva	1	6	[10]
(Brazil) O Luz (Brazil) M Zormann	1	1
2	(Argentina) G Andreozzi (Argentina) G Durán	6	6

Quarterfinals
(Bolivia) H Dellien (Bolivia) M Dellien
(Bolivia) B Arias (Bolivia) F Zeballos	w/o
3	(Italy) L Darderi (Ukraine) O Prihodko	6	6
(Italy) F Agamenone (Argentina) F Díaz Acosta	2	0
(Argentina) F Coria (Argentina) C Ugo Carabelli
4	(Poland) K Drzewiecki (Poland) P Matuszewski	w/o
(Argentina) H Casanova (Brazil) D Dutra da Silva	3	2
2	(Argentina) G Andreozzi (Argentina) G Durán	6	6

Semifinals
(Bolivia) B Arias (Bolivia) F Zeballos	4	3
3	(Italy) L Darderi (Ukraine) O Prihodko	6	6
4	(Poland) K Drzewiecki (Poland) P Matuszewski	5	3
2	(Argentina) G Andreozzi (Argentina) G Durán	7	6

Final
3	(Italy) L Darderi (Ukraine) O Prihodko	6^{1}	7^{7}	[7]
2	(Argentina) G Andreozzi (Argentina) G Durán	7^{7}	6^{3}	[10]
