= 2023 Challenger Concepción – Singles =

Singles
- 2023 Challenger Concepción

Final
- Champion: (Argentina) Federico Coria
- Runner-up: (Kazakhstan) Timofey Skatov
- Score: 6–4, 6–3

Events
Singles	Doubles
← 2022 ·	Challenger Concepción	· 2024 →

Daniel Elahi Galán was the defending champion but chose not to defend his title.

Federico Coria won the title after defeating Timofey Skatov 6–4, 6–3 in the final.

== Seeds ==
1. (Argentina) Federico Coria (champion)
2. (Chile) Alejandro Tabilo (quarterfinals)
3. (Peru) Juan Pablo Varillas (second round)
4. (Argentina) Juan Manuel Cerúndolo (quarterfinals)
5. (Argentina) Camilo Ugo Carabelli (second round)
6. (Bolivia) Hugo Dellien (semifinals)
7. (Argentina) Federico Delbonis (quarterfinals)
8. (Kazakhstan) Timofey Skatov (final)

== Draw ==
Key

- Q = Qualifier
- WC = Wild card
- LL = Lucky loser
- Alt = Alternate
- ITF = ITF entry
- PR = Protected ranking
- SR = Special ranking
- SE = Special exempt
- JE = Junior exempt
- JR = Junior Accelerator Programme entrant
- CO = College Accelerator Programme entrant
- NG = Next Gen Accelerator Program entrant
- w/o = Walkover
- r = Retired
- d = Defaulted

=== Finals ===
Semifinals
1	(Argentina) Federico Coria	6	6
6	(Bolivia) Hugo Dellien	1	2
(Argentina) Facundo Díaz Acosta	5	1^{r}
8	(Kazakhstan) Timofey Skatov	7	1

Final
1	(Argentina) Federico Coria	6	6
8	(Kazakhstan) Timofey Skatov	4	3

=== Top half ===
First round
1	(Argentina) F Coria	6	6
Q	(Brazil) D Dutra da Silva	4	3
Q	(Brazil) P Boscardin Dias	6	6
WC	(Chile) M Soto	0	2
(Italy) F Agamenone	1	4
Q	(Spain) O Roca Batalla	6	6
WC	(Chile) G Lama	1	7	5
7	(Argentina) F Delbonis	6	5	7
4	(Argentina) JM Cerúndolo	1	7^{7}	6
(Chile) T Barrios Vera	6	6^{5}	1
(Brazil) M Pucinelli de Almeida	7^{7}	1	6^{5}
Q	(Argentina) H Casanova	6^{4}	6	7^{7}
(Argentina) JP Ficovich	2	2
(Argentina) N Kicker	6	6
(Kazakhstan) M Kukushkin	2	2
6	(Bolivia) H Dellien	6	6

Second round
1	(Argentina) F Coria	6	6
Q	(Brazil) P Boscardin Dias	2	4
Q	(Spain) O Roca Batalla	6^{4}	3
7	(Argentina) F Delbonis	7^{7}	6
4	(Argentina) JM Cerúndolo	7	6
Q	(Argentina) H Casanova	5	3
(Argentina) N Kicker	6	4	0
6	(Bolivia) H Dellien	4	6	6

Quarterfinals
1	(Argentina) F Coria	3	6	6
7	(Argentina) F Delbonis	6	2	2
4	(Argentina) JM Cerúndolo	3	3
6	(Bolivia) H Dellien	6	6

Semifinals
1	(Argentina) F Coria	6	6
6	(Bolivia) H Dellien	1	2

=== Bottom half ===
First round
5	(Argentina) C Ugo Carabelli	6	4	7
(Argentina) TA Tirante	4	6	5
Q	(Argentina) JB Torres	6	6
(Argentina) R Olivo	3	4
Q	(Brazil) JL Reis da Silva	4	6	3
(Argentina) F Díaz Acosta	6	3	6
Alt	(Argentina) A Collarini	6	2	2
3	(Peru) JP Varillas	3	6	6
8	(Kazakhstan) T Skatov	7	7^{8}
(Chinese Taipei) T-l Wu	5	6^{6}
LL	(Colombia) N Mejía	7^{7}	5	7^{8}
(Argentina) GA Olivieri	6^{5}	7	6^{6}
(Italy) L Darderi	6	6
WC	(Argentina) G Andreozzi	3	2
Alt	(Argentina) M Navone	6	6^{0}	1
2	(Chile) A Tabilo	1	7^{7}	6

Second round
5	(Argentina) C Ugo Carabelli	6	3	0
Q	(Argentina) JB Torres	4	6	6
(Argentina) F Díaz Acosta	6	5	6
3	(Peru) JP Varillas	1	7	3
8	(Kazakhstan) T Skatov	6	6
LL	(Colombia) N Mejía	2	2
(Italy) L Darderi	4	5
2	(Chile) A Tabilo	6	7

Quarterfinals
Q	(Argentina) JB Torres	3	7^{7}	3
(Argentina) F Díaz Acosta	6	6^{2}	6
8	(Kazakhstan) T Skatov	6	3	7
2	(Chile) A Tabilo	4	6	5

Semifinals
(Argentina) F Díaz Acosta	5	1^{r}
8	(Kazakhstan) T Skatov	7	1
