= 2025 Challenger Concepción – Doubles =

Doubles
- 2025 Challenger Concepción

Final
- Champions: (United States) Vasil Kirkov (Chile) Matías Soto
- Runners-up: (Japan) Seita Watanabe (Japan) Takeru Yuzuki
- Score: 6–2, 6–4

Events
Singles	Doubles
- Challenger Concepción

Seita Watanabe and Takeru Yuzuki were the defending champions but lost in the final to Vasil Kirkov and Matías Soto.

Kirkov and Soto won the title after defeating Watanabe and Yuzuki 6–2, 6–4 in the final.

== Seeds ==
1. (United States) Vasil Kirkov / (Chile) Matías Soto (champions)
2. (Bolivia) Boris Arias / (Bolivia) Federico Zeballos (first round)
3. (Japan) Seita Watanabe / (Japan) Takeru Yuzuki (final)
4. (Brazil) Luís Britto / (Brazil) Daniel Dutra da Silva (semifinals)

== Draw ==
Key

- Q = Qualifier
- WC = Wild card
- LL = Lucky loser
- Alt = Alternate
- ITF = ITF entry
- PR = Protected ranking
- SR = Special ranking
- SE = Special exempt
- JE = Junior exempt
- JR = Junior Accelerator Programme entrant
- CO = College Accelerator Programme entrant
- NG = Next Gen Accelerator Program entrant
- w/o = Walkover
- r = Retired
- d = Defaulted

=== Draw ===
First round
1	(United States) V Kirkov (Chile) M Soto	6	6
(Ukraine) V Orlov (Brazil) PA Saraiva dos Santos	2	1
(Peru) A Huertas del Pino (Peru) C Huertas del Pino	7^{9}	6
(Argentina) H Casanova (Argentina) A Collarini	6^{7}	2
4	(Brazil) L Britto (Brazil) D Dutra da Silva	6	7
(Switzerland) R Bertola (Argentina) R Olivo	2	5
(Argentina) Valentín Basel (Colombia) C Rodríguez	4	6	[10]
WC	(United States) Milledge Cossu (Chile) Amador Salazar	6	3	[5]
(Argentina) Leonardo Aboian (Argentina) V Aboian	6	6
WC	(Chile) Alejandro Bancalari (Chile) T Barrios Vera	2	4
(Uruguay) I Carou (Argentina) JB Torres	6^{3}	3
3	(Japan) S Watanabe (Japan) T Yuzuki	7^{7}	6
(France) E Couacaud (Brazil) Gabriel Roveri Sidney	4	6^{4}
(Colombia) A Urrea (Argentina) G Villanueva	6	7^{7}
(Argentina) GI Justo (Argentina) F Mena	5	6	[16]
2	(Bolivia) B Arias (Bolivia) F Zeballos	7	3	[14]

Quarterfinals
1	(United States) V Kirkov (Chile) M Soto	6	6
(Peru) A Huertas del Pino (Peru) C Huertas del Pino	3	4
4	(Brazil) L Britto (Brazil) D Dutra da Silva	6	6
(Argentina) V Basel (Colombia) C Rodríguez	4	3
(Argentina) L Aboian (Argentina) V Aboian	4	3
3	(Japan) S Watanabe (Japan) T Yuzuki	6	6
(Colombia) A Urrea (Argentina) G Villanueva	6	2	[2]
(Argentina) GI Justo (Argentina) F Mena	0	6	[10]

Semifinals
1	(United States) V Kirkov (Chile) M Soto	7^{7}	7
4	(Brazil) L Britto (Brazil) D Dutra da Silva	6^{5}	5
3	(Japan) S Watanabe (Japan) T Yuzuki	6	6
(Argentina) GI Justo (Argentina) F Mena	1	2

Final
1	(United States) V Kirkov (Chile) M Soto	6	6
3	(Japan) S Watanabe (Japan) T Yuzuki	2	4
