= 2021 Challenger Concepción – Singles =

Singles
- 2021 Challenger Concepción

Final
- Champion: (Argentina) Sebastián Báez
- Runner-up: (Argentina) Francisco Cerúndolo
- Score: 6–3, 6–7^{(5–7)}, 7–6^{(7–5)}

Events
Singles	Doubles
Challenger Concepción	· 2022 →

This was the first edition of the tournament.

Sebastián Báez won the title after defeating Francisco Cerúndolo 6–3, 6–7^{(5–7)}, 7–6^{(7–5)} in the final.

== Seeds ==
1. (Argentina) Federico Coria (quarterfinals)
2. (Slovakia) Andrej Martin (semifinals)
3. (Portugal) Pedro Sousa (withdrew)
4. (Bolivia) Hugo Dellien (quarterfinals)
5. (Colombia) Daniel Elahi Galán (second round)
6. (Brazil) Thiago Seyboth Wild (quarterfinals)
7. (Argentina) Facundo Bagnis (first round)
8. (Germany) Daniel Altmaier (quarterfinals)

== Draw ==
=== Key ===
- Q = Qualifier
- WC = Wild card
- LL = Lucky loser
- Alt = Alternate
- SE = Special exempt
- PR = Protected ranking
- ITF = ITF entry
- JE = Junior exempt
- w/o = Walkover
- r = Retired
- d = Defaulted
- SR = Special ranking

=== Finals ===
Semifinals
(Chile) Alejandro Tabilo	1	1
(Argentina) Francisco Cerúndolo	6	6
(Argentina) Sebastián Báez	6	6
2	(Slovakia) Andrej Martin	4	3

Final
(Argentina) Francisco Cerúndolo	3	7^{7}	6^{5}
(Argentina) Sebastián Báez	6	6^{5}	7^{7}

=== Top half ===
First round
1	(Argentina) F Coria	6	6
Q	(Ukraine) V Sachko	2	2
(Brazil) G Clezar	2	2
(Chile) MT Barrios Vera	6	6
(Portugal) J Domingues	4	6	7
Q	(Spain) C Gómez-Herrera	6	4	5
(Chile) A Tabilo	6	7
7	(Argentina) F Bagnis	2	5
Alt	(Argentina) C Ugo Carabelli	1	7^{7}	2
WC	(Chile) N Jarry	6	6^{1}	6
(Argentina) F Cerúndolo	7	7
(Argentina) A Collarini	5	5
(Ecuador) E Gómez	6	1	6
WC	(Peru) N Álvarez	4	6	0
(Brazil) O Luz	1	2
6	(Brazil) T Seyboth Wild	6	6

Second round
1	(Argentina) F Coria	6	6
(Chile) MT Barrios Vera	4	4
(Portugal) J Domingues	6^{5}	2
(Chile) A Tabilo	7^{7}	6
WC	(Chile) N Jarry	6	4	5
(Argentina) F Cerúndolo	4	6	7
(Ecuador) E Gómez	1	2
6	(Brazil) T Seyboth Wild	6	6

Quarterfinals
1	(Argentina) F Coria	5	7^{7}	6^{2}
(Chile) A Tabilo	7	6^{4}	7^{7}
(Argentina) F Cerúndolo	6	7^{7}
6	(Brazil) T Seyboth Wild	3	6^{4}

Semifinals
(Chile) A Tabilo	1	1
(Argentina) F Cerúndolo	6	6

=== Bottom half ===
First round
5	(Colombia) DE Galán	6	6
Q	(Argentina) TA Tirante	3	4
WC	(Chile) G Lama	4	1
(Argentina) S Báez	6	6
Q	(Argentina) H Casanova	3	7	6
(Sweden) C Lindell	6	5	1
(Brazil) F Meligeni Alves	0	6^{7}
4	(Bolivia) H Dellien	6	7^{9}
8	(Germany) D Altmaier	4	6	6
(Argentina) JM Cerúndolo	6	2	1
(Slovakia) L Klein	7	6
(Argentina) F Mena	5	1
(Brazil) P Sakamoto	6	7^{7}
(Argentina) G Andreozzi	2	6^{3}
(Brazil) J Menezes	3	2
2	(Slovakia) A Martin	6	6

Second round
5	(Colombia) DE Galán	5	2
(Argentina) S Báez	7	6
Q	(Argentina) H Casanova	1	3
4	(Bolivia) H Dellien	6	6
8	(Germany) D Altmaier	1	6	6
(Slovakia) L Klein	6	3	3
(Brazil) P Sakamoto	3	3
2	(Slovakia) A Martin	6	6

Quarterfinals
(Argentina) S Báez	6	6
4	(Bolivia) H Dellien	1	1
8	(Germany) D Altmaier	6^{4}	3
2	(Slovakia) A Martin	7^{7}	6

Semifinals
(Argentina) S Báez	6	6
2	(Slovakia) A Martin	4	3
