= 2021 Challenger Concepción – Doubles =

Doubles
- 2021 Challenger Concepción

Final
- Champions: (Brazil) Orlando Luz (Brazil) Rafael Matos
- Runners-up: (Peru) Sergio Galdós (Ecuador) Diego Hidalgo
- Score: 7–5, 6–4

Events
Singles	Doubles
Challenger Concepción	· 2022 →

This was the first edition of the tournament.

Orlando Luz and Rafael Matos won the title after defeating Sergio Galdós and Diego Hidalgo 7–5, 6–4 in the final.

== Seeds ==
1. (Brazil) Orlando Luz / (Brazil) Rafael Matos (champions)
2. (Peru) Sergio Galdós / (Ecuador) Diego Hidalgo (final)
3. (Argentina) Matías Franco Descotte / (Brazil) Fernando Romboli (first round)
4. (Bolivia) Boris Arias / (Bolivia) Federico Zeballos (semifinals)

== Draw ==
=== Key ===
- Q = Qualifier
- WC = Wild card
- LL = Lucky loser
- Alt = Alternate
- SE = Special exempt
- PR = Protected ranking
- ITF = ITF entry
- JE = Junior exempt
- w/o = Walkover
- r = Retired
- d = Defaulted
- SR = Special ranking

First round
1	(Brazil) O Luz (Brazil) R Matos	w/o
(Portugal) J Domingues (Brazil) F Meligeni Alves
(Ecuador) E Gómez (Spain) C Gómez-Herrera	7	6
Alt	(Argentina) H Casanova (Argentina) C Ugo Carabelli	5	1
3	(Argentina) MF Descotte (Brazil) F Romboli	5	5
(Chile) MT Barrios Vera (Chile) A Tabilo	7	7
(Argentina) M Kestelboim (Argentina) F Mena	w/o
WC	(Argentina) F Díaz Acosta (Chile) G Lama
(Brazil) J Menezes (Brazil) T Seyboth Wild	w/o
(Peru) N Álvarez (Ukraine) V Sachko
WC	(Chile) Alejandro Bancalari (Chile) Jordan Iturra	0	2
4	(Bolivia) B Arias (Bolivia) F Zeballos	6	6
(Argentina) F Coria (Bolivia) H Dellien	6	6
WC	(Chile) Javier Araya Vargas (Chile) Cristóbal Castro López	1	1
(Argentina) S Báez (Argentina) TA Tirante
2	(Peru) S Galdós (Ecuador) D Hidalgo	w/o

Quarterfinals
1	(Brazil) O Luz (Brazil) R Matos	w/o
(Ecuador) E Gómez (Spain) C Gómez-Herrera
(Chile) MT Barrios Vera (Chile) A Tabilo	6	6
(Argentina) M Kestelboim (Argentina) F Mena	3	4
(Brazil) J Menezes (Brazil) T Seyboth Wild
4	(Bolivia) B Arias (Bolivia) F Zeballos	w/o
(Argentina) F Coria (Bolivia) H Dellien	4	3
2	(Peru) S Galdós (Ecuador) D Hidalgo	6	6

Semifinals
1	(Brazil) O Luz (Brazil) R Matos	w/o
(Chile) MT Barrios Vera (Chile) A Tabilo
4	(Bolivia) B Arias (Bolivia) F Zeballos	6	5	[7]
2	(Peru) S Galdós (Ecuador) D Hidalgo	3	7	[10]

Final
1	(Brazil) O Luz (Brazil) R Matos	7	6
2	(Peru) S Galdós (Ecuador) D Hidalgo	5	4
