= 2025 Challenger Concepción – Singles =

Singles
- 2025 Challenger Concepción

Final
- Champion: (United States) Emilio Nava
- Runner-up: (Argentina) Nicolás Kicker
- Score: 6–1, 7–6^{(7–3)}

Events
Singles	Doubles
- Challenger Concepción

Gonzalo Bueno was the defending champion but lost in the second round to Emilio Nava.

Nava won the title after defeating Nicolás Kicker 6–1, 7–6^{(7–3)} in the final.

== Seeds ==
1. (Brazil) Thiago Monteiro (withdrew)
2. (Colombia) Daniel Elahi Galán (quarterfinals)
3. (Argentina) Román Andrés Burruchaga (quarterfinals)
4. (Chile) Tomás Barrios Vera (first round)
5. (Argentina) Facundo Mena (first round)
6. (Paraguay) Daniel Vallejo (first round)
7. (Argentina) Andrea Collarini (second round)
8. (United States) Emilio Nava (champion)

== Draw ==
Key

- Q = Qualifier
- WC = Wild card
- LL = Lucky loser
- Alt = Alternate
- ITF = ITF entry
- PR = Protected ranking
- SR = Special ranking
- SE = Special exempt
- JE = Junior exempt
- JR = Junior Accelerator Programme entrant
- CO = College Accelerator Programme entrant
- NG = Next Gen Accelerator Program entrant
- w/o = Walkover
- r = Retired
- d = Defaulted

=== Finals ===
Semifinals
Q	(Argentina) Nicolás Kicker	4	7	6
(Chile) Matías Soto	6	5	3
8	(United States) Emilio Nava	6	6
(Argentina) Genaro Alberto Olivieri	2	4

Final
Q	(Argentina) Nicolás Kicker	1	6^{3}
8	(United States) Emilio Nava	6	7^{7}

=== Top half ===
First round
LL	(Japan) Yuki Mochizuki	3	1
(Argentina) GI Justo	6	6
WC	(Chile) Nicolás Villalón	3	3
(Argentina) R Olivo	6	6
(Argentina) H Casanova	2	5
(Peru) JP Varillas	6	7
Q	(Argentina) N Kicker	6	6
6	(Paraguay) AD Vallejo	1	1
3	(Argentina) RA Burruchaga	6	7
(Argentina) JB Torres	2	5
Q	(Peru) C Huertas del Pino	6	7^{7}
Q	(Ukraine) V Orlov	3	6^{4}
(Chile) M Soto	6	6
(Bulgaria) P Nesterov	1	4
Q	(Argentina) V Aboian	6	5	6
5	(Argentina) F Mena	3	7	1

Second round
(Argentina) GI Justo	7	6
(Argentina) R Olivo	5	4
(Peru) JP Varillas	0	1
Q	(Argentina) N Kicker	6	6
3	(Argentina) RA Burruchaga	6	4	6
Q	(Peru) C Huertas del Pino	1	6	3
(Chile) M Soto	7^{7}	3	6
Q	(Argentina) V Aboian	6^{5}	6	1

Quarterfinals
(Argentina) GI Justo	4	6	1
Q	(Argentina) N Kicker	6	1	6
3	(Argentina) RA Burruchaga	5	4
(Chile) M Soto	7	6

Semifinals
Q	(Argentina) N Kicker	4	7	6
(Chile) M Soto	6	5	3

=== Bottom half ===
First round
8	(United States) Em Nava	6	6
(Brazil) D Dutra da Silva	2	4
(Peru) G Bueno	6	6
WC	(Germany) D Dedura-Palomero	3	2
(France) E Couacaud	6^{9}	6	4
Q	(Brazil) P Boscardin Dias	7^{11}	4	6
(Brazil) JL Reis da Silva	6	6
4	(Chile) T Barrios Vera	3	2
7	(Argentina) A Collarini	6	7
Q	(Brazil) J Pereira	1	5
Alt	(Argentina) G Villanueva	5	1
(Argentina) GA Olivieri	7	6
(Ecuador) Á Guillén Meza	2	3
(Brazil) M Pucinelli de Almeida	6	6
(Switzerland) R Bertola	3	1
2	(Colombia) DE Galán	6	6

Second round
8	(United States) Em Nava	6	6
(Peru) G Bueno	0	3
Q	(Brazil) P Boscardin Dias	6	5	3
(Brazil) JL Reis da Silva	2	7	6
7	(Argentina) A Collarini	7^{7}	6^{5}	3
(Argentina) GA Olivieri	6^{3}	7^{7}	6
(Brazil) M Pucinelli de Almeida	4	3
2	(Colombia) DE Galán	6	6

Quarterfinals
8	(United States) Em Nava	6	6
(Brazil) JL Reis da Silva	2	3
(Argentina) GA Olivieri	7^{10}	6
2	(Colombia) DE Galán	6^{8}	4

Semifinals
8	(United States) Em Nava	6	6
(Argentina) GA Olivieri	2	4
