= 2026 Challenger Concepción – Doubles =

Doubles
- 2026 Challenger Concepción

Final
- Champions: (Ecuador) Gonzalo Escobar (Brazil) Eduardo Ribeiro
- Runners-up: (Argentina) Mariano Kestelboim (Brazil) Marcelo Zormann
- Score: 7–6^{(7–4)}, 6–4

Events
Singles	Doubles
- Challenger Concepción

Vasil Kirkov and Matías Soto were the defending champions but only Soto chose to defend his title, partnering Federico Zeballos. He lost in the quarterfinals to Anders Matta and Alejandro Tabilo.

Gonzalo Escobar and Eduardo Ribeiro won the title after defeating Mariano Kestelboim and Marcelo Zormann 7–6^{(7–4)}, 6–4 in the final.

== Seeds ==
1. (Romania) Alexandru Jecan / (Romania) Bogdan Pavel (first round)
2. (Chile) Matías Soto / (Bolivia) Federico Zeballos (quarterfinals)
3. (Argentina) Mariano Kestelboim / (Brazil) Marcelo Zormann (final)
4. (Ecuador) Gonzalo Escobar / (Brazil) Eduardo Ribeiro (champions)

== Draw ==
Key

- Q = Qualifier
- WC = Wild card
- LL = Lucky loser
- Alt = Alternate
- ITF = ITF entry
- PR = Protected ranking
- SR = Special ranking
- SE = Special exempt
- JE = Junior exempt
- JR = Junior Accelerator Programme entrant
- CO = College Accelerator Programme entrant
- NG = Next Gen Accelerator Program entrant
- w/o = Walkover
- r = Retired
- d = Defaulted

First round
1	(Romania) A Jecan (Romania) B Pavel	0	4
(Uruguay) I Carou (Paraguay) AD Vallejo	6	6
Alt	(Brazil) F Meligeni Alves (Brazil) M Pucinelli de Almeida	w/o
(Brazil) D Dutra da Silva (Argentina) F Mena
3	(Argentina) M Kestelboim (Brazil) M Zormann	6	6
WC	(Chile) Ignacio Becerra (United States) Milledge Cossu	2	0
(Peru) A Huertas del Pino (Brazil) Bruno Oliveira	4	6	[10]
(Peru) G Bueno (Peru) C Huertas del Pino	6	4	[6]
(Argentina) A Collarini (Ecuador) Á Guillén Meza	4	3
4	(Ecuador) G Escobar (Brazil) E Ribeiro	6	6
WC	(Chile) Anders Matta (Chile) A Tabilo	6	5	[10]
Alt	(Argentina) GI Justo (Uruguay) F Roncadelli	3	7	[7]
(Brazil) P Boscardin Dias (Brazil) JL Reis da Silva	5	2
2	(Chile) M Soto (Bolivia) F Zeballos	7	6

Quarterfinals
(Uruguay) I Carou (Paraguay) AD Vallejo	6	1	[10]
Alt	(Brazil) F Meligeni Alves (Brazil) M Pucinelli de Almeida	4	6	[5]
3	(Argentina) M Kestelboim (Brazil) M Zormann	7^{7}	6
(Brazil) PA Saraiva dos Santos (Argentina) G Villanueva	6^{2}	3
(Peru) A Huertas del Pino (Brazil) B Oliveira	4	4
4	(Ecuador) G Escobar (Brazil) E Ribeiro	6	6
WC	(Chile) A Matta (Chile) A Tabilo	6	2	[12]
2	(Chile) M Soto (Bolivia) F Zeballos	2	6	[10]

Semifinals
(Uruguay) I Carou (Paraguay) AD Vallejo	1	6	[4]
3	(Argentina) M Kestelboim (Brazil) M Zormann	6	2	[10]
4	(Ecuador) G Escobar (Brazil) E Ribeiro	4	7	[10]
WC	(Chile) A Matta (Chile) A Tabilo	6	5	[6]

Final
3	(Argentina) M Kestelboim (Brazil) M Zormann	6^{4}	4
4	(Ecuador) G Escobar (Brazil) E Ribeiro	7^{7}	6
