= 2023 Challenger Concepción =

- Date: 24–29 January
- Edition: 3rd
- Surface: Clay
- Location: Concepción, Chile

Champions

Singles
- (Argentina) Federico Coria

Doubles
- (Argentina) Guido Andreozzi / (Argentina) Guillermo Durán
← 2022 ·	Challenger Concepción	· 2024 →

The 2023 Challenger Concepción was a professional tennis tournament played on clay courts. It was the third edition of the tournament which was part of the 2023 ATP Challenger Tour. It took place in Concepción, Chile between 24 and 29 January 2023.

== Singles main-draw entrants ==
=== Seeds ===
Country	Player	Rank^{1}	Seed
ARG	Federico Coria	76	1
CHI	Alejandro Tabilo	102	2
PER	Juan Pablo Varillas	103	3
ARG	Juan Manuel Cerúndolo	126	4
ARG	Camilo Ugo Carabelli	127	5
BOL	Hugo Dellien	131	6
ARG	Federico Delbonis	136	7
KAZ	Timofey Skatov	144	8

- ^{1} Rankings are as of 16 January 2023.

=== Other entrants ===
The following players received wildcards into the singles main draw:

- (Argentina) Guido Andreozzi
- (Chile) Gonzalo Lama
- (Chile) Matías Soto

The following players received entry into the singles main draw as alternates:

- (Argentina) Andrea Collarini
- (Argentina) Mariano Navone

The following players received entry from the qualifying draw:

- (Brazil) Pedro Boscardin Dias
- (Argentina) Hernán Casanova
- (Brazil) Daniel Dutra da Silva
- (Brazil) João Lucas Reis da Silva
- (Spain) Oriol Roca Batalla
- (Argentina) Juan Bautista Torres

The following player received entry as a lucky loser:

- (Colombia) Nicolás Mejía

== Champions ==
=== Singles ===
- (Argentina) Federico Coria def. (Kazakhstan) Timofey Skatov 6–4, 6–3.

=== Doubles ===
- (Argentina) Guido Andreozzi / (Argentina) Guillermo Durán def. (Italy) Luciano Darderi / (Ukraine) Oleg Prihodko 7–6^{(7–1)}, 6–7^{(3–7)}, [10–7].
