= 2022 Challenger Concepción – Doubles =

Doubles
- 2022 Challenger Concepción

Final
- Champions: (Ecuador) Diego Hidalgo (Colombia) Cristian Rodríguez
- Runners-up: (Argentina) Francisco Cerúndolo (Argentina) Camilo Ugo Carabelli
- Score: 6–2, 6–0

Events
Singles	Doubles
← 2021 ·	Challenger Concepción	· 2023 →

Orlando Luz and Rafael Matos were the defending champions but chose not to compete.

Diego Hidalgo and Cristian Rodríguez won the title after defeating Francisco Cerúndolo and Camilo Ugo Carabelli 6–2, 6–0 in the final.

== Seeds ==
1. (Argentina) Guillermo Durán / (Venezuela) Luis David Martínez (quarterfinals)
2. (Argentina) Renzo Olivo / (Mexico) Miguel Ángel Reyes-Varela (quarterfinals)
3. (Slovakia) Andrej Martin / (Austria) Tristan-Samuel Weissborn (quarterfinals)
4. (Ecuador) Diego Hidalgo / (Colombia) Cristian Rodríguez (champions)

== Draw ==
=== Key ===
- Q = Qualifier
- WC = Wild card
- LL = Lucky loser
- Alt = Alternate
- SE = Special exempt
- PR = Protected ranking
- ITF = ITF entry
- JE = Junior exempt
- w/o = Walkover
- r = Retired
- d = Defaulted
- SR = Special ranking

First round
(Bolivia) H Dellien (Spain) C Gómez-Herrera	2	2
(Brazil) D Dutra da Silva (Brazil) P Sakamoto	6	6
3	(Slovakia) A Martin (Austria) T-S Weissborn	6	6
(Chile) G Lama (United States) N Moreno de Alboran	4	3
(Argentina) F Cerúndolo (Argentina) C Ugo Carabelli	6	6
WC	(Chile) Ignacio Becerra (Chile) Nicolás Iraira	1	0
WC	(Chile) Gonzalo Achondo (Chile) Víctor Núñez	1	6^{3}
(Peru) S Galdós (Peru) A Merino	6	7^{7}
(Colombia) DE Galán (Argentina) F Mena	2	0
4	(Ecuador) D Hidalgo (Colombia) C Rodríguez	6	6
(Bolivia) B Arias (Brazil) Wilson Leite	3	0
(Argentina) MF Descotte (Argentina) G Villanueva	6	6

Quarterfinals
1	(Argentina) G Durán (Venezuela) LD Martínez	3	6	[7]
(Brazil) D Dutra da Silva (Brazil) P Sakamoto	6	2	[10]
3	(Slovakia) A Martin (Austria) T-S Weissborn	4	6	[4]
(Argentina) F Cerúndolo (Argentina) C Ugo Carabelli	6	4	[10]
(Peru) S Galdós (Peru) A Merino	5	3
4	(Ecuador) D Hidalgo (Colombia) C Rodríguez	7	6
(Argentina) MF Descotte (Argentina) G Villanueva	6	4	[10]
2	(Argentina) R Olivo (Mexico) MÁ Reyes-Varela	3	6	[1]

Semifinals
(Brazil) D Dutra da Silva (Brazil) P Sakamoto	6	4	[4]
(Argentina) F Cerúndolo (Argentina) C Ugo Carabelli	0	6	[10]
4	(Ecuador) D Hidalgo (Colombia) C Rodríguez	6	6
(Argentina) MF Descotte (Argentina) G Villanueva	4	4

Final
(Argentina) F Cerúndolo (Argentina) C Ugo Carabelli	2	0
4	(Ecuador) D Hidalgo (Colombia) C Rodríguez	6	6
