= 2026 Challenger Concepción – Singles =

Singles
- 2026 Challenger Concepción

Final
- Champion: (Paraguay) Daniel Vallejo
- Runner-up: (Chile) Alejandro Tabilo
- Score: 6–2, 1–6, 6–1

Events
Singles	Doubles
- Challenger Concepción

Emilio Nava was the defending champion but chose not to defend his title.

Daniel Vallejo won the title after defeating Alejandro Tabilo 6–2, 1–6, 6–1 in the final.

== Seeds ==
1. (Chile) Alejandro Tabilo (final)
2. (Chile) Tomás Barrios Vera (semifinals)
3. (Chinese Taipei) Tseng Chun-hsin (quarterfinals)
4. (Serbia) Dušan Lajović (second round)
5. (Bolivia) Hugo Dellien (first round)
6. (Paraguay) Daniel Vallejo (champion)
7. (Argentina) Alex Barrena (second round)
8. (Ecuador) Álvaro Guillén Meza (second round)

== Draw ==
Key

- Q = Qualifier
- WC = Wild card
- LL = Lucky loser
- Alt = Alternate
- ITF = ITF entry
- PR = Protected ranking
- SR = Special ranking
- SE = Special exempt
- JE = Junior exempt
- JR = Junior Accelerator Programme entrant
- CO = College Accelerator Programme entrant
- NG = Next Gen Accelerator Program entrant
- w/o = Walkover
- r = Retired
- d = Defaulted

=== Finals ===
Semifinals
1	(Chile) Alejandro Tabilo	6	6
(Italy) Marco Cecchinato	3	1
6	(Paraguay) Daniel Vallejo	6	1	6
2	(Chile) Tomás Barrios Vera	3	6	4

Final
1	(Chile) Alejandro Tabilo	2	6	1
6	(Paraguay) Daniel Vallejo	6	1	6

=== Top half ===
First round
1	(Chile) A Tabilo	7	6
Q	(Argentina) G Villanueva	5	4
WC	(Chile) M Soto	2	6	7^{7}
(Argentina) N Kicker	6	4	6^{3}
(Argentina) L Midón	6	2	6
WC	(Chile) Nicolás Villalón	3	6	4
Alt	(Brazil) M Pucinelli de Almeida	6	6^{5}	4
7	(Argentina) A Barrena	1	7^{7}	6
3	(Chinese Taipei) C-h Tseng	7^{7}	6
(Argentina) GA Olivieri	6^{4}	1
(Bolivia) M Dellien	3	1
Q	(Brazil) D Dutra da Silva	6	6
(Italy) M Cecchinato	6	6
Q	(Brazil) I Marcondes	0	3
(Argentina) A Collarini	2	6	3
8	(Ecuador) Á Guillén Meza	6	4	6

Second round
1	(Chile) A Tabilo	6	6
WC	(Chile) M Soto	2	3
(Argentina) L Midón	6	7
7	(Argentina) A Barrena	2	5
3	(Chinese Taipei) C-h Tseng	7	6
Q	(Brazil) D Dutra da Silva	5	4
(Italy) M Cecchinato	7	6
8	(Ecuador) Á Guillén Meza	5	1

Quarterfinals
1	(Chile) A Tabilo	5	6	6
(Argentina) L Midón	7	1	2
3	(Chinese Taipei) C-h Tseng	2	2
(Italy) M Cecchinato	6	6

Semifinals
1	(Chile) A Tabilo	6	6
(Italy) M Cecchinato	3	1

=== Bottom half ===
First round
6	(Paraguay) AD Vallejo	6	6
Alt	(Brazil) P Boscardin Dias	2	4
(Peru) JP Varillas	7	6
(Brazil) F Meligeni Alves	5	2
Alt	(Spain) N Sánchez Izquierdo	4	2
(Brazil) JL Reis da Silva	6	6
Q	(Argentina) F Mena	2	1
4	(Serbia) D Lajović	6	6
5	(Bolivia) H Dellien	6	4	1
Q	(Argentina) JB Torres	0	6	6
Q	(Argentina) GI Justo	6	7^{7}
WC	(Chile) Benjamín Torrealba	2	6^{4}
(Brazil) T Monteiro	6	6
(Argentina) F Díaz Acosta	4	4
(Peru) G Bueno	6	2	4
2	(Chile) T Barrios Vera	3	6	6

Second round
6	(Paraguay) AD Vallejo	6	6
(Peru) JP Varillas	4	2
(Brazil) JL Reis da Silva	6	2	6
4	(Serbia) D Lajović	3	6	1
Q	(Argentina) JB Torres	3	2
Q	(Argentina) GI Justo	6	6
(Brazil) T Monteiro	2	5
2	(Chile) T Barrios Vera	6	7

Quarterfinals
6	(Paraguay) AD Vallejo	3	6	6
(Brazil) JL Reis da Silva	6	3	1
Q	(Argentina) GI Justo	3	6	4
2	(Chile) T Barrios Vera	6	4	6

Semifinals
6	(Paraguay) AD Vallejo	6	1	6
2	(Chile) T Barrios Vera	3	6	4
