= 2024 Challenger Concepción – Doubles =

Doubles
- 2024 Challenger Concepción

Final
- Champions: (Japan) Seita Watanabe (Japan) Takeru Yuzuki
- Runners-up: (Australia) Patrick Harper (United Kingdom) David Stevenson
- Score: 6–4, 7–6^{(8–6)}

Events
Singles	Doubles
- Challenger Concepción

Guido Andreozzi and Guillermo Durán were the defending champions but chose not to defend their title.

Seita Watanabe and Takeru Yuzuki won the title after defeating Patrick Harper and David Stevenson 6–4, 7–6^{(8–6)} in the final.

== Seeds ==
1. (Brazil) Luís Britto / (Argentina) Gonzalo Villanueva (quarterfinals)
2. (Brazil) Pedro Boscardin Dias / (Ecuador) Álvaro Guillén Meza (first round)
3. (Uruguay) Ignacio Carou / (Argentina) Hernán Casanova (first round)
4. (Uruguay) Franco Roncadelli / (Greece) Stefanos Sakellaridis (quarterfinals)

== Draw ==
Key

- Q = Qualifier
- WC = Wild card
- LL = Lucky loser
- Alt = Alternate
- ITF = ITF entry
- PR = Protected ranking
- SR = Special ranking
- SE = Special exempt
- JE = Junior exempt
- JR = Junior Accelerator Programme entrant
- CO = College Accelerator Programme entrant
- NG = Next Gen Accelerator Program entrant
- w/o = Walkover
- r = Retired
- d = Defaulted

=== Draw ===
First round
1	(Brazil) L Britto (Argentina) G Villanueva	6	0
(Brazil) J Pereira (Japan) K Uchida	0	0^{r}
(Japan) S Watanabe (Japan) T Yuzuki	6	6
Alt	(Argentina) F Ribero (Argentina) JB Torres	4	3
3	(Uruguay) I Carou (Argentina) H Casanova	2	0
(Dominican Republic) R Cid Subervi (Turkey) E Kırkın	6	6
(Brazil) D Dutra da Silva (Brazil) Wilson Leite	6	4	[10]
(Argentina) Leonardo Aboian (Argentina) V Aboian	1	6	[8]
(Australia) P Harper (United Kingdom) D Stevenson	6	6
WC	(Chile) Ignacio Becerra (Chile) Daniel Antonio Núñez	4	3
(Argentina) F Mena (Chile) M Soto	1	6	[3]
4	(Uruguay) F Roncadelli (Greece) S Sakellaridis	6	3	[10]
(Peru) G Bueno (Argentina) Tomás Farjat	6	6
WC	(Chile) Javier Guzmán (Chile) José Luis Zenteno	1	3
(Israel) R Stepanov (Colombia) A Urrea	6	6
2	(Brazil) P Boscardin Dias (Ecuador) Á Guillén Meza	2	3

Quarterfinals
1	(Brazil) L Britto (Argentina) G Villanueva	7^{7}	3	[4]
(Japan) S Watanabe (Japan) T Yuzuki	6^{4}	6	[10]
(Dominican Republic) R Cid Subervi (Turkey) E Kırkın	6	6
(Brazil) D Dutra da Silva (Brazil) W Leite	2	0
(Australia) P Harper (United Kingdom) D Stevenson	6	6
4	(Uruguay) F Roncadelli (Greece) S Sakellaridis	3	4
(Peru) G Bueno (Argentina) T Farjat	6	7
(Israel) R Stepanov (Colombia) A Urrea	4	5

Semifinals
(Japan) S Watanabe (Japan) T Yuzuki	6	5	[11]
(Dominican Republic) R Cid Subervi (Turkey) E Kırkın	3	7	[9]
(Australia) P Harper (United Kingdom) D Stevenson	6	0
(Peru) G Bueno (Argentina) T Farjat	3	0^{r}

Final
(Japan) S Watanabe (Japan) T Yuzuki	6	7^{8}
(Australia) P Harper (United Kingdom) D Stevenson	4	6^{6}
