= 2021 Argentina Open – Singles =

Singles
- 2021 Argentina Open

Final
- Champion: (Argentina) Diego Schwartzman
- Runner-up: (Argentina) Francisco Cerúndolo
- Score: 6–1, 6–2

Details
- Draw: 28 (4 Q / 3 WC )
- Seeds: 8

Events
Singles	Doubles
- ATP Buenos Aires

Diego Schwartzman defeated Francisco Cerúndolo in the final, 6–1, 6–2 to win the men's singles tennis title at the 2021 Argentina Open.

Casper Ruud was the defending champion, but chose not to participate.

== Seeds ==
The top four seeds receive a bye into the second round.

1. (Argentina) Diego Schwartzman (champion)
2. (Chile) Cristian Garín (second round)
3. (France) Benoît Paire (second round)
4. (Serbia) Miomir Kecmanović (semifinals)
5. (Spain) Albert Ramos Viñolas (semifinals)
6. (Spain) Pablo Andújar (quarterfinals)
7. (Serbia) Laslo Đere (quarterfinals)
8. (United States) Frances Tiafoe (second round)

== Draw ==
Key

- Q = Qualifier
- WC = Wild card
- LL = Lucky loser
- Alt = Alternate
- ITF = ITF entry
- PR = Protected ranking
- SR = Special ranking
- SE = Special exempt
- JE = Junior exempt
- JR = Junior Accelerator Programme entrant
- CO = College Accelerator Programme entrant
- NG = Next Gen Accelerator Program entrant
- w/o = Walkover
- r = Retired
- d = Defaulted

=== Finals ===
Semifinals
1	(Argentina) Diego Schwartzman	6	6
4	(Serbia) Miomir Kecmanović	0	4
Q	(Argentina) Francisco Cerúndolo	7^{7}	3	6
5	(Spain) Albert Ramos Viñolas	6^{5}	6	2

Final
1	(Argentina) Diego Schwartzman	6	6
Q	(Argentina) Francisco Cerúndolo	1	2

=== Top half ===
First round
(Slovakia) A Martin	4	3
Q	(Slovakia) L Klein	6	6
WC	(Argentina) F Díaz Acosta	6^{5}	3
Q	(Spain) J Munar	7^{7}	6
SE	(Argentina) F Bagnis	1	3
8	(United States) F Tiafoe	6	6
(Spain) R Carballés Baena	2	3
(Brazil) T Monteiro	6	6
(Argentina) F Delbonis	6	7^{7}
SE	(Argentina) JM Cerúndolo	4	6^{2}
(Italy) M Cecchinato	7^{7}	2	3
7	(Serbia) L Đere	6^{4}	6	6

Second round
1	(Argentina) D Schwartzman	6	6
Q	(Slovakia) L Klein	4	2
Q	(Spain) J Munar	7^{7}	6
8	(United States) F Tiafoe	6^{4}	4
4	(Serbia) M Kecmanović	5	6	6
(Brazil) T Monteiro	7	3	4
(Argentina) F Delbonis	6^{1}	3
7	(Serbia) L Đere	7^{7}	6

Quarterfinals
1	(Argentina) D Schwartzman	6	7
Q	(Spain) J Munar	2	5
4	(Serbia) M Kecmanović	6	7^{8}
7	(Serbia) L Đere	4	6^{6}

Semifinals
1	(Argentina) D Schwartzman	6	6
4	(Serbia) M Kecmanović	0	4

=== Bottom half ===
First round
6	(Spain) P Andújar	6	6
(Argentina) JI Londero	3	0
(Italy) G Mager	7^{7}	6
(Italy) S Caruso	6^{5}	4
Q	(Argentina) F Cerúndolo	6	7
(Argentina) F Coria	4	5
5	(Spain) A Ramos Viñolas	2	6	6
WC	(Denmark) H Rune	6	4	3
(Germany) D Koepfer	2	6	6
WC	(Argentina) TA Tirante	6	3	4
(Portugal) J Sousa	2	0
Q	(India) S Nagal	6	6

Second round
6	(Spain) P Andújar	6	7^{7}
(Italy) G Mager	4	6^{5}
Q	(Argentina) F Cerúndolo	4	6	6
3	(France) B Paire	6	3	1
5	(Spain) A Ramos Viñolas	7	6
(Germany) D Koepfer	5	4
Q	(India) S Nagal	6	6
2	(Chile) C Garín	4	3

Quarterfinals
6	(Spain) P Andújar	6	3	2
Q	(Argentina) F Cerúndolo	1	6	6
5	(Spain) A Ramos Viñolas	4	6	7
Q	(India) S Nagal	6	2	5

Semifinals
Q	(Argentina) F Cerúndolo	7^{7}	3	6
5	(Spain) A Ramos Viñolas	6^{5}	6	2

== Qualifying ==
=== Seeds ===
1. (Spain) Jaume Munar (qualified)
2. (Bolivia) Hugo Dellien (first round, withdrew)
3. (Colombia) Daniel Elahi Galán (withdrew)
4. (Brazil) Thiago Seyboth Wild (second round)
5. (Slovakia) Jozef Kovalík (second round)
6. (Argentina) Francisco Cerúndolo (qualified)
7. (Germany) Daniel Altmaier (qualifying competition)
8. (Argentina) Leonardo Mayer (first round)

=== Qualifiers ===
1. (Spain) Jaume Munar
2. (Argentina) Francisco Cerúndolo
3. (India) Sumit Nagal
4. (Slovakia) Lukáš Klein

=== Qualifying draw ===
==== First qualifier ====
First round
1	(Spain) Jaume Munar	6	6^{5}	6
WC	(Peru) Nicolás Álvarez	4	7^{7}	2
(Argentina) Sebastián Báez	6	6
(Chile) Alejandro Tabilo	1	0
(Argentina) Facundo Mena	3	4
(Peru) Juan Pablo Varillas	6	6
(Brazil) Orlando Luz	4	7	2
7	(Germany) Daniel Altmaier	6	5	6

Second round
1	(Spain) Jaume Munar	5	6	2
(Argentina) Sebastián Báez	7	3	1^{r}
(Peru) Juan Pablo Varillas	4	7^{7}	5
7	(Germany) Daniel Altmaier	6	6^{3}	7

Qualifying competition
1	(Spain) Jaume Munar	6	6
7	(Germany) Daniel Altmaier	3	4

==== Second qualifier ====
First round
2	(Bolivia) Hugo Dellien
(Brazil) Pedro Sakamoto	w/o
WC	(Argentina) Agustín Velotti	7	6
(Argentina) Guido Andreozzi	5	0
WC	(Argentina) Hernán Casanova	6	3	3
(Brazil) Guilherme Clezar	1	6	6
(Brazil) João Menezes	6	4	4
6	(Argentina) Francisco Cerúndolo	4	6	6

Second round
(Brazil) Pedro Sakamoto	3	4
WC	(Argentina) Agustín Velotti	6	6
(Brazil) Guilherme Clezar	6	3	2
6	(Argentina) Francisco Cerúndolo	2	6	6

Qualifying competition
WC	(Argentina) Agustín Velotti	4	5
6	(Argentina) Francisco Cerúndolo	6	7

==== Third qualifier ====
First round
Alt	(Spain) Carlos Gómez-Herrera	6^{2}	6	6^{2}
(India) Sumit Nagal	7^{7}	2	7^{7}
(Spain) Mario Vilella Martínez	6	7
(Chile) Marcelo Tomás Barrios Vera	4	5
WC	(Argentina) Nicolás Kicker	7	7
(Argentina) Renzo Olivo	5	5
(Ecuador) Emilio Gómez	5	4
5	(Slovakia) Jozef Kovalík	7	6

Second round
(India) Sumit Nagal	6	6
(Spain) Mario Vilella Martínez	4	2
WC	(Argentina) Nicolás Kicker	1	7^{8}	7
5	(Slovakia) Jozef Kovalík	6	6^{6}	5

Qualifying competition
(India) Sumit Nagal	2	6	6
WC	(Argentina) Nicolás Kicker	6	2	3

==== Fourth qualifier ====
First round
4	(Brazil) Thiago Seyboth Wild	6	7^{7}
Alt	(Sweden) Christian Lindell	1	6^{4}
(Argentina) Andrea Collarini	4	5
(Slovakia) Lukáš Klein	6	7
(Portugal) João Domingues	3	6	6
(Argentina) Tomás Martín Etcheverry	6	0	3
(United States) Ernesto Escobedo	7	7^{7}
8	(Argentina) Leonardo Mayer	5	6^{5}

Second round
4	(Brazil) Thiago Seyboth Wild	3	5
(Slovakia) Lukáš Klein	6	7
(Portugal) João Domingues	1	6	3
(United States) Ernesto Escobedo	6	1	6

Qualifying competition
(Slovakia) Lukáš Klein	6	6
(United States) Ernesto Escobedo	2	3
