= 2024 Challenger Concepción – Singles =

Singles
- 2024 Challenger Concepción

Final
- Champion: (Peru) Gonzalo Bueno
- Runner-up: (Argentina) Juan Pablo Ficovich
- Score: 6–4, 6–0

Events
Singles	Doubles
- Challenger Concepción

Federico Coria was the defending champion but chose not to defend his title.

Gonzalo Bueno won the title after defeating Juan Pablo Ficovich 6–4, 6–0 in the final.

== Seeds ==
1. (Argentina) Genaro Alberto Olivieri (quarterfinals)
2. (Argentina) Juan Pablo Ficovich (final)
3. (Argentina) Renzo Olivo (first round, retired)
4. (Ecuador) Álvaro Guillén Meza (quarterfinals)
5. (Turkey) Ergi Kırkın (second round)
6. (Peru) Gonzalo Bueno (champion)
7. (Argentina) Hernán Casanova (second round)
8. (Dominican Republic) Roberto Cid Subervi (first round)

== Draw ==
Key

- Q = Qualifier
- WC = Wild card
- LL = Lucky loser
- Alt = Alternate
- ITF = ITF entry
- PR = Protected ranking
- SR = Special ranking
- SE = Special exempt
- JE = Junior exempt
- JR = Junior Accelerator Programme entrant
- CO = College Accelerator Programme entrant
- NG = Next Gen Accelerator Program entrant
- w/o = Walkover
- r = Retired
- d = Defaulted

=== Finals ===
Semifinals
6	(Peru) Gonzalo Bueno	6	6
Q	(Brazil) José Pereira	4	4
Q	(Greece) Stefanos Sakellaridis	2	5
2	(Argentina) Juan Pablo Ficovich	6	7

Final
6	(Peru) Gonzalo Bueno	6	6
2	(Argentina) Juan Pablo Ficovich	4	0

=== Top half ===
First round
1	(Argentina) GA Olivieri	6	6
Q	(Argentina) Lautaro Agustín Falabella	3	3
(Japan) K Uchida	2	1
(Argentina) V Aboian	6	6
(Brazil) P Boscardin Dias	3	4
Q	(Argentina) F Ribero	6	6
(Brazil) Nicolas Zanellato	7	3	0
6	(Peru) G Bueno	5	6	6
4	(Ecuador) Á Guillén Meza	6	6
WC	(Chile) Benjamín Torres	2	1
(Ecuador) E Gómez	3	6^{0}
Q	(Argentina) Leonardo Aboian	6	7^{7}
Q	(Brazil) J Pereira	6	6
WC	(Chile) Ignacio Becerra	2	0
(Chile) M Soto	3	0
7	(Argentina) H Casanova	6	6

Second round
1	(Argentina) GA Olivieri	6	6
(Argentina) V Aboian	4	4
Q	(Argentina) F Ribero	3	1
6	(Peru) G Bueno	6	6
4	(Ecuador) Á Guillén Meza	6	6
Q	(Argentina) L Aboian	0	3
Q	(Brazil) J Pereira	6^{4}	6	6
7	(Argentina) H Casanova	7^{7}	3	1

Quarterfinals
1	(Argentina) GA Olivieri	6	2	6^{4}
6	(Peru) G Bueno	4	6	7^{7}
4	(Ecuador) Á Guillén Meza	4	6	5
Q	(Brazil) J Pereira	6	4	7

Semifinals
6	(Peru) G Bueno	6	6
Q	(Brazil) J Pereira	4	4

=== Bottom half ===
First round
5	(Turkey) E Kırkın	6	6
(Argentina) LE Ambrogi	4	2
(Argentina) G Villanueva	3	4
Q	(Greece) S Sakellaridis	6	6
(Argentina) F Mena	7	6
WC	(Chile) Daniel Antonio Núñez	5	1
(Brazil) D Dutra da Silva	7	5
3	(Argentina) R Olivo	5	1^{r}
8	(Dominican Republic) R Cid Subervi	1	5
Q	(Uruguay) F Roncadelli	6	7
Alt	(Bolivia) JC Prado Ángelo	6	6
PR	(Peru) N Álvarez	1	2
(Argentina) Lorenzo Joaquín Rodríguez	0	2^{r}
(Argentina) JB Torres	6	5
Alt	(Argentina) GI Justo	0	7^{7}	3
2	(Argentina) JP Ficovich	6	6^{5}	6

Second round
5	(Turkey) E Kırkın	3	6	5
Q	(Greece) S Sakellaridis	6	3	7
(Argentina) F Mena	7	6
(Brazil) D Dutra da Silva	5	4
Q	(Uruguay) F Roncadelli	1	6	3
Alt	(Bolivia) JC Prado Ángelo	6	4	6
(Argentina) JB Torres	1	4
2	(Argentina) JP Ficovich	6	6

Quarterfinals
Q	(Greece) S Sakellaridis	6	0	6
(Argentina) F Mena	4	6	3
Alt	(Bolivia) JC Prado Ángelo	1	6	6^{5}
2	(Argentina) JP Ficovich	6	3	7^{7}

Semifinals
Q	(Greece) S Sakellaridis	2	5
2	(Argentina) JP Ficovich	6	7
