= 2024 Croatia Open Umag – Singles =

Singles
- 2024 Croatia Open Umag

Final
- Champion: (Argentina) Francisco Cerúndolo
- Runner-up: (Italy) Lorenzo Musetti
- Score: 2–6, 6–4, 7–6^{(7–5)}

Details
- Draw: 28
- Seeds: 8

Events
| Singles | Doubles |
- Croatia Open

Francisco Cerúndolo won the singles title at the 2024 Croatia Open Umag, defeating Lorenzo Musetti in the final, 2–6, 6–4, 7–6^{(7–5)}. It was his third ATP Tour title.

Alexei Popyrin was the defending champion, but lost to Jakub Menšík in the first round.

== Seeds ==
The top four seeds received a bye into the second round.

1. Andrey Rublev (semifinals)
2. (Italy) Lorenzo Musetti (final)
3. (Denmark) Holger Rune (withdrew)
4. (Argentina) Francisco Cerúndolo (champion)
5. (Italy) Luciano Darderi (second round)
6. (Argentina) Mariano Navone (first round)
7. (Czech Republic) Tomáš Macháč (first round)
8. (Italy) Matteo Arnaldi (first round)

== Draw ==
Key

- Q = Qualifier
- WC = Wild card
- LL = Lucky loser
- Alt = Alternate
- ITF = ITF entry
- PR = Protected ranking
- SR = Special ranking
- SE = Special exempt
- JE = Junior exempt
- JR = Junior Accelerator Programme entrant
- CO = College Accelerator Programme entrant
- NG = Next Gen Accelerator Program entrant
- w/o = Walkover
- r = Retired
- d = Defaulted

=== Finals ===
Semifinals
1 | Andrey Rublev | 6^{6} | 4
4 | (Argentina) Francisco Cerúndolo | 7^{8} | 6
(Czech Republic) Jakub Menšík | 4 | 1
2 | (Italy) Lorenzo Musetti | 6 | 6

Final
4 | (Argentina) Francisco Cerúndolo | 2 | 6 | 7^{7}
2 | (Italy) Lorenzo Musetti | 6 | 4 | 6^{5}

=== Top half ===
First round
(Argentina) C Ugo Carabelli | 6 | 7
WC | (Croatia) L Mikrut | 2 | 5
(Kazakhstan) A Shevchenko | 4 | 6 | 6^{8}
(Hungary) F Marozsán | 6 | 4 | 7^{10}
(Brazil) T Monteiro | 3 | 6 | 6
7 | (Czech Republic) T Macháč | 6 | 3 | 4
Q | (France) E Couacaud | 6 | 3 | 2
WC | (Croatia) M Dodig | 3 | 6 | 6
WC | (Croatia) M Poljičak | 2 | 7^{7} | 6^{9}
(Italy) L Sonego | 6 | 6^{1} | 7^{11}
Alt | (France) A Müller | 7^{10} | 6
8 | (Italy) M Arnaldi | 6^{8} | 4

Second round
1 | A Rublev | 6 | 7
(Argentina) C Ugo Carabelli | 4 | 5
(Hungary) F Marozsán | 6 | 7^{9}
(Brazil) T Monteiro | 2 | 6^{7}
4 | (Argentina) F Cerúndolo | 6 | 6
WC | (Croatia) M Dodig | 3 | 4
(Italy) L Sonego | 7 | 6
Alt | (France) A Müller | 5 | 1

Quarterfinals
1 | A Rublev | 5 | 6 | 6
(Hungary) F Marozsán | 7 | 3 | 2
4 | (Argentina) F Cerúndolo | 6 | 2 | 7^{7}
(Italy) L Sonego | 4 | 6 | 6^{2}

Semifinals
1 | A Rublev | 6^{6} | 4
4 | (Argentina) F Cerúndolo | 7^{8} | 6

=== Bottom half ===
First round
5 | (Italy) L Darderi | 6 | 6
SE | (Croatia) D Ajduković | 1 | 4
(Czech Republic) J Menšík | 6 | 6
(Australia) A Popyrin | 3 | 2
(France) L Van Assche | 4 | 3
(Italy) F Fognini | 6 | 6
6 | (Argentina) M Navone | 2 | 3
(Italy) F Cobolli | 6 | 6
Q | (Austria) F Misolic | 4 | 6 | 2
(Serbia) D Lajović | 6 | 3 | 6
Q | (Argentina) M Trungelliti | 4 | 6 | 6
Q | (Argentina) G Andreozzi | 6 | 3 | 2

Second round
5 | (Italy) L Darderi | 4 | 3
(Czech Republic) J Menšík | 6 | 6
(Italy) F Fognini | 1 | 0
LL | (Chinese Taipei) C-h Tseng | 6 | 6
(Italy) F Cobolli | 6^{5} | 6^{3}
(Serbia) D Lajović | 7^{7} | 7^{7}
Q | (Argentina) M Trungelliti | 4 | 3
2 | (Italy) L Musetti | 6 | 6

Quarterfinals
(Czech Republic) J Menšík | 6 | 6
LL | (Chinese Taipei) C-h Tseng | 0 | 4
(Serbia) D Lajović | 7 | 3 | 0
2 | (Italy) L Musetti | 5 | 6 | 6

Semifinals
(Czech Republic) J Menšík | 4 | 1
2 | (Italy) L Musetti | 6 | 6

== Qualifying ==
=== Seeds ===
1. (Slovakia) Jozef Kovalík (first round)
2. (Argentina) Marco Trungelliti (qualified)
3. (Spain) Oriol Roca Batalla (first round)
4. (Chinese Taipei) Tseng Chun-hsin (qualifying competition, lucky loser)
5. (Portugal) Jaime Faria (first round)
6. (Portugal) Henrique Rocha (qualifying competition)
7. (Dominican Republic) Nick Hardt (first round)
8. (Hungary) Zsombor Piros (first round)

=== Qualifiers ===
1. (Austria) Filip Misolic
2. (Argentina) Guido Andreozzi
3. (Argentina) Marco Trungelliti
4. (France) Enzo Couacaud

=== Lucky loser ===
1. (Chinese Taipei) Tseng Chun-hsin

=== Qualifying draw ===
==== First qualifier ====
First round
1 | (Slovakia) Jozef Kovalík | 4 | 7^{8} | 3
(Austria) Filip Misolic | 6 | 6^{6} | 6
(Spain) David Jordà Sanchis | 7^{7} | 5 | 7^{7}
7 | (Dominican Republic) Nick Hardt | 6^{3} | 7 | 6^{5}

Qualifying competition
(Austria) Filip Misolic | 6 | 6
(Spain) David Jordà Sanchis | 3 | 4

==== Second qualifier ====
First round
Alt | (Croatia) Nino Serdarušić | 4 | 4
Alt | (Argentina) Guido Andreozzi | 6 | 6
WC | (Croatia) Deni Žmak | 2 | 4
4 | (Chinese Taipei) Tseng Chun-hsin | 6 | 6

Qualifying competition
Alt | (Argentina) Guido Andreozzi | 6 | 7
4 | (Chinese Taipei) Tseng Chun-hsin | 4 | 5

==== Third qualifier ====
First round
2 | (Argentina) Marco Trungelliti | 6 | 6
WC | (Croatia) Matija Pecotić | 3 | 3
8 | (Hungary) Zsombor Piros | 1 | 6^{4}
6 | (Portugal) Henrique Rocha | 6 | 7^{7}

Qualifying competition
2 | (Argentina) Marco Trungelliti | 6 | 6
6 | (Portugal) Henrique Rocha | 3 | 2

==== Fourth qualifier ====
First round
3 | (Spain) Oriol Roca Batalla | 3 | 7 | 1
(Argentina) Renzo Olivo | 6 | 5 | 6
(France) Enzo Couacaud | 6 | 4 | 6
5 | (Portugal) Jaime Faria | 0 | 6 | 2

Qualifying competition
(Argentina) Renzo Olivo | 0 | 1
(France) Enzo Couacaud | 6 | 6
