= 2024 Croatia Open Umag =

- Date: 21–27 July
- Edition: 34th
- Category: ATP 250
- Draw: 28S / 16D
- Prize money: €579,320
- Surface: Clay
- Location: Umag, Croatia

Champions

Singles
- (Argentina) Francisco Cerúndolo

Doubles
- (Argentina) Guido Andreozzi / (Mexico) Miguel Ángel Reyes-Varela
- Croatia Open

The 2024 Croatia Open Umag, also known as the Plava Laguna Croatia Open Umag (for sponsorship reasons), was a men's tennis tournament played on outdoor clay courts. It was the 34th edition of the Croatia Open, and an ATP 250 tournament on the 2024 ATP Tour. It took place at the International Tennis Center in Umag, Croatia, from 21 through 27 July 2024. Fourth-seeded Francisco Cerúndolo won the singles title.

== Finals ==
=== Singles ===
(Argentina) Francisco Cerúndolo defeated (Italy) Lorenzo Musetti, 2–6, 6–4, 7–6^{(7–5)}

- It was Cerúndolo's only singles title of the year and the 3rd of his career.

=== Doubles ===
(Argentina) Guido Andreozzi / (Mexico) Miguel Ángel Reyes-Varela defeated (France) Manuel Guinard / (France) Grégoire Jacq, 6–4, 6–2

== Singles main draw entrants ==
=== Seeds ===
Country	Player	Rank^{1}	Seed
	Andrey Rublev	8	1
ITA	Lorenzo Musetti	16	2
~~DEN~~	~~Holger Rune~~	~~17~~	~~3~~
ARG	Francisco Cerúndolo	33	4
ITA	Luciano Darderi	35	5
ARG	Mariano Navone	36	6
CZE	Tomáš Macháč	38	7
ITA	Matteo Arnaldi	39	8

- ^{1} Rankings are as of 15 July 2024.

=== Other entrants ===
The following players received wildcards into the main draw:

- (Croatia) Matej Dodig
- (Croatia) Luka Mikrut
- (Croatia) Mili Poljičak

The following player received entry as a special exempt:

- (Croatia) Duje Ajduković

The following player received entry as an alternate:

- (France) Alexandre Müller

The following players received entry from the qualifying draw:

- (Argentina) Guido Andreozzi
- (France) Enzo Couacaud
- (Austria) Filip Misolic
- (Argentina) Marco Trungelliti

The following player received entry as a lucky loser:

- (Chinese Taipei) Tseng Chun-hsin

=== Withdrawals ===
- (United Kingdom) Jack Draper → replaced by (Italy) Fabio Fognini
- (United Kingdom) Dan Evans → replaced by (France) Luca Van Assche
- (Denmark) Holger Rune → replaced by (Chinese Taipei) Tseng Chun-hsin

== Doubles main draw entrants ==
=== Seeds ===
Country	Player	Country	Player	Rank^{1}	Seed
IND	Yuki Bhambri	FRA	Albano Olivetti	100	1
FRA	Théo Arribagé	FRA	Sadio Doumbia	114	2
COL	Nicolás Barrientos	POR	Francisco Cabral	121	3
ARG	Guido Andreozzi	MEX	Miguel Ángel Reyes-Varela	140	4

- ^{1} Rankings as of 15 July 2024.

=== Other entrants ===
The following pairs received wildcards into the doubles main draw:

- (Croatia) Karlo Kajin / (Croatia) Deni Žmak
- (Slovenia) Blaž Rola / (Croatia) Nino Serdarušić

=== Withdrawals ===
- (India) Sriram Balaji / (India) Rohan Bopanna → replaced by (India) Anirudh Chandrasekar / (India) Arjun Kadhe
