= 2024 Croatia Open Umag – Doubles =

Doubles
- 2024 Croatia Open Umag
- 2023 Champions: (Slovenia) Blaž Rola (Croatia) Nino Serdarušić

Final
- Champions: (Argentina) Guido Andreozzi (Mexico) Miguel Ángel Reyes-Varela
- Runners-up: (France) Manuel Guinard (France) Grégoire Jacq
- Score: 6–4, 6–2

Details
- Draw: 16
- Seeds: 4

Events
Singles	Doubles
← 2023 ·	Croatia Open	· 2025 →

Guido Andreozzi and Miguel Ángel Reyes-Varela won the doubles title at the 2024 Croatia Open Umag, defeating Manuel Guinard and Grégoire Jacq in the final, 6–4, 6–2.

Blaž Rola and Nino Serdarušić were the defending champions, but lost in the first round to Sander Arends and Denys Molchanov.

== Seeds ==
1. (India) Yuki Bhambri / (France) Albano Olivetti (quarterfinals)
2. (France) Théo Arribagé / (France) Sadio Doumbia (first round)
3. (Colombia) Nicolás Barrientos / (Portugal) Francisco Cabral (quarterfinals)
4. (Argentina) Guido Andreozzi / (Mexico) Miguel Ángel Reyes-Varela (champions)

== Draw ==
=== Key ===
- Q = Qualifier
- WC = Wild card
- LL = Lucky loser
- Alt = Alternate
- ITF = ITF entry
- PR = Protected ranking
- SR = Special ranking
- SE = Special exempt
- JE = Junior exempt
- JR = Junior Accelerator Programme entrant
- CO = College Accelerator Programme entrant
- NG = Next Gen Accelerator Program entrant
- w/o = Walkover
- r = Retired
- d = Defaulted

=== Draw ===
First round
1	(India) Y Bhambri (France) A Olivetti	6	6
(Slovakia) J Kovalík (Argentina) C Ugo Carabelli	3	2
(France) M Guinard (France) G Jacq	7^{7}	6
(Italy) M Bortolotti (Australia) MC Romios	6^{3}	3
3	(Colombia) N Barrientos (Portugal) F Cabral	6	3	[12]
(Czech Republic) R Jebavý (Czech Republic) T Macháč	3	6	[10]
(Venezuela) LD Martínez (Colombia) C Rodríguez	3	6	[4]
(Brazil) F Romboli (Brazil) M Zormann	6	3	[10]
WC	(Croatia) K Kajin (Croatia) D Žmak	4	4
(France) J Eysseric (Brazil) O Luz	6	6
(India) A Chandrasekar (India) A Kadhe	2	2
4	(Argentina) G Andreozzi (Mexico) MÁ Reyes-Varela	6	6
WC	(Slovenia) B Rola (Croatia) N Serdarušić	2	4
(Netherlands) S Arends (Ukraine) D Molchanov	6	6
(Germany) J Schnaitter (Germany) M Wallner	6	6
2	(France) T Arribagé (France) S Doumbia	4	3

Quarterfinals
1	(India) Y Bhambri (France) A Olivetti	4	6	[6]
(France) M Guinard (France) G Jacq	6	1	[10]
3	(Colombia) N Barrientos (Portugal) F Cabral	3	4
(Brazil) F Romboli (Brazil) M Zormann	6	6
(France) J Eysseric (Brazil) O Luz	6	6^{7}	[10]
4	(Argentina) G Andreozzi (Mexico) MÁ Reyes-Varela	2	7^{9}	[12]
(Netherlands) S Arends (Ukraine) D Molchanov	6	7
(Germany) J Schnaitter (Germany) M Wallner	4	5

Semifinals
(France) M Guinard (France) G Jacq	7	6
(Brazil) F Romboli (Brazil) M Zormann	5	2
4	(Argentina) G Andreozzi (Mexico) MÁ Reyes-Varela	6	6
(Netherlands) S Arends (Ukraine) D Molchanov	4	3

Final
(France) M Guinard (France) G Jacq	4	2
4	(Argentina) G Andreozzi (Mexico) MÁ Reyes-Varela	6	6
