= 2022 Challenger Concepción =

- Date: 17–23 January
- Edition: 2nd
- Surface: Clay
- Location: Concepción, Chile

Champions

Singles
- (Colombia) Daniel Elahi Galán

Doubles
- (Ecuador) Diego Hidalgo / (Colombia) Cristian Rodríguez
| ← 2021 · | Challenger Concepción | · 2023 → |

The 2022 Challenger Concepción was a professional tennis tournament played on clay courts. It was the second edition of the tournament which was part of the 2022 ATP Challenger Tour. It took place in Concepción, Chile between 17 and 23 January 2022.

== Singles main-draw entrants ==
=== Seeds ===
| Country | Player | Rank^{1} | Seed |
|---|---|---|---|
| BOL | Hugo Dellien | 113 | 1 |
| SVK | Andrej Martin | 116 | 2 |
| COL | Daniel Elahi Galán | 119 | 3 |
| ARG | Francisco Cerúndolo | 125 | 4 |
| ARG | Renzo Olivo | 188 | 5 |
| ARG | Facundo Mena | 209 | 6 |
| ARG | Camilo Ugo Carabelli | 215 | 7 |
| ARG | Santiago Rodríguez Taverna | 266 | 8 |

- ^{1} Rankings as of 10 January 2022.

=== Other entrants ===
The following players received wildcards into the singles main draw:

- (Argentina) Francisco Cerúndolo
- (Bolivia) Hugo Dellien
- (Chile) Benjamín Torres

The following players received entry into the singles main draw as alternates:

- (Chile) Gonzalo Achondo
- (Argentina) Román Andrés Burruchaga
- (Argentina) Matías Franco Descotte
- (France) Quentin Folliot
- (Ecuador) Diego Hidalgo
- (United States) Strong Kirchheimer
- (Brazil) Wilson Leite
- (Colombia) Cristian Rodríguez
- (Chile) Michel Vernier

The following players received entry from the qualifying draw:

- (Chile) Ignacio Becerra
- (Chile) Cristóbal Castro
- (Chile) Felipe Hernández
- (Peru) Alexander Merino
- (Chile) Víctor Núñez
- (Mexico) Miguel Ángel Reyes-Varela

== Champions ==
=== Singles ===
- (Colombia) Daniel Elahi Galán def. (Argentina) Santiago Rodríguez Taverna 6–1, 3–6, 6–3.

=== Doubles ===
- (Ecuador) Diego Hidalgo / (Colombia) Cristian Rodríguez def. (Argentina) Francisco Cerúndolo / (Argentina) Camilo Ugo Carabelli 6–2, 6–0.
