= 2021 Challenger Concepción =

- Date: 15–21 February
- Edition: 1st
- Surface: Clay
- Location: Concepción, Chile

Champions

Singles
- (Argentina) Sebastián Báez

Doubles
- (Brazil) Orlando Luz / (Brazil) Rafael Matos
| Challenger Concepción | · 2022 → |

The 2021 Challenger Concepción was a professional tennis tournament played on clay courts. It was the first edition of the tournament which was part of the 2021 ATP Challenger Tour. It took place in Concepción, Chile between 15 and 21 February 2021.

== Singles main-draw entrants ==
=== Seeds ===
| Country | Player | Rank^{1} | Seed |
|---|---|---|---|
| ARG | Federico Coria | 92 | 1 |
| SVK | Andrej Martin | 103 | 2 |
| ~~POR~~ | ~~Pedro Sousa~~ | ~~107~~ | ~~3~~ |
| BOL | Hugo Dellien | 112 | 4 |
| COL | Daniel Elahi Galán | 115 | 5 |
| BRA | Thiago Seyboth Wild | 117 | 6 |
| ARG | Facundo Bagnis | 127 | 7 |
| GER | Daniel Altmaier | 134 | 8 |

- ^{1} Rankings as of 8 February 2021.

=== Other entrants ===
The following players received wildcards into the singles main draw:

- (Peru) Nicolás Álvarez
- (Chile) Nicolás Jarry
- (Chile) Gonzalo Lama

The following player received entry into the singles main draw as an alternate:

- (Argentina) Camilo Ugo Carabelli

The following players received entry from the qualifying draw:

- (Argentina) Hernán Casanova
- (Spain) Carlos Gómez-Herrera
- (Ukraine) Vitaliy Sachko
- (Argentina) Thiago Agustín Tirante

== Champions ==
=== Singles ===
- (Argentina) Sebastián Báez def. (Argentina) Francisco Cerúndolo 6–3, 6–7^{(5–7)}, 7–6^{(7–5)}.

=== Doubles ===
- (Brazil) Orlando Luz / (Brazil) Rafael Matos def. (Peru) Sergio Galdós / (Ecuador) Diego Hidalgo 7–5, 6–4.
