= 2026 Challenger Concepción =

- Date: 27 January – 1 February
- Edition: 6th
- Surface: Clay
- Location: Concepción, Chile

Champions

Singles
- (Paraguay) Daniel Vallejo

Doubles
- (Ecuador) Gonzalo Escobar / (Brazil) Eduardo Ribeiro
- Challenger Concepción

The 2026 Challenger Concepción was a professional tennis tournament played on clay courts. It was the sixth edition of the tournament which was part of the 2026 ATP Challenger Tour. It took place in Concepción, Chile between 27 January and 1 February 2026.

== Singles main-draw entrants ==
=== Seeds ===
Country	Player	Rank^{1}	Seed
CHI	Alejandro Tabilo	79	1
CHI	Tomás Barrios Vera	107	2
TPE	Tseng Chun-hsin	122	3
SRB	Dušan Lajović	125	4
BOL	Hugo Dellien	137	5
PAR	Daniel Vallejo	146	6
ARG	Alex Barrena	190	7
ECU	Álvaro Guillén Meza	195	8

- ^{1} Rankings are as of 19 January 2026.

=== Other entrants ===
The following players received wildcards into the singles main draw:

- (Chile) Matías Soto
- (Chile) Benjamín Torrealba
- (Chile) Nicolás Villalón

The following players received entry into the singles main draw as alternates:

- (Brazil) Pedro Boscardin Dias
- (Brazil) Matheus Pucinelli de Almeida
- (Spain) Nikolás Sánchez Izquierdo

The following players received entry from the qualifying draw:

- (Brazil) Daniel Dutra da Silva
- (Argentina) Guido Iván Justo
- (Brazil) Igor Marcondes
- (Argentina) Facundo Mena
- (Argentina) Juan Bautista Torres
- (Argentina) Gonzalo Villanueva

== Champions ==
=== Singles ===
- (Paraguay) Daniel Vallejo def. (Chile) Alejandro Tabilo 6–2, 1–6, 6–1.

=== Doubles ===
- (Ecuador) Gonzalo Escobar / (Brazil) Eduardo Ribeiro def. (Argentina) Mariano Kestelboim / (Brazil) Marcelo Zormann 7–6^{(7–4)}, 6–4.
