= 2024 Challenger Concepción =

- Date: 22–28 April
- Edition: 4th
- Surface: Clay
- Location: Concepción, Chile

Champions

Singles
- (Peru) Gonzalo Bueno

Doubles
- (Japan) Seita Watanabe / (Japan) Takeru Yuzuki
- Challenger Concepción

The 2024 Challenger Concepción was a professional tennis tournament played on clay courts. It was the fourth edition of the tournament which was part of the 2024 ATP Challenger Tour. It took place in Concepción, Chile between 22 and 28 April 2024.

== Singles main-draw entrants ==
=== Seeds ===
Country	Player	Rank^{1}	Seed
ARG	Genaro Alberto Olivieri	194	1
ARG	Juan Pablo Ficovich	238	2
ARG	Renzo Olivo	287	3
ECU	Álvaro Guillén Meza	291	4
TUR	Ergi Kırkın	302	5
PER	Gonzalo Bueno	336	6
ARG	Hernán Casanova	384	7
DOM	Roberto Cid Subervi	396	8

- ^{1} Rankings are as of 15 April 2024.

=== Other entrants ===
The following players received wildcards into the singles main draw:

- (Chile) Ignacio Becerra
- (Chile) Daniel Antonio Núñez
- (Chile) Benjamín Torres

The following player received entry into the singles main draw using a protected ranking:

- (Peru) Nicolás Álvarez

The following players received entry into the singles main draw as alternates:

- (Argentina) Guido Iván Justo
- (Bolivia) Juan Carlos Prado Ángelo

The following players received entry from the qualifying draw:

- (Argentina) Leonardo Aboian
- (Argentina) Lautaro Agustín Falabella
- (Brazil) José Pereira
- (Argentina) Franco Ribero
- (Uruguay) Franco Roncadelli
- (Greece) Stefanos Sakellaridis

== Champions ==
=== Singles ===
- (Peru) Gonzalo Bueno def. (Argentina) Juan Pablo Ficovich 6–4, 6–0.

=== Doubles ===
- (Japan) Seita Watanabe / (Japan) Takeru Yuzuki def. (Australia) Patrick Harper / (United Kingdom) David Stevenson 6–4, 7–6^{(8–6)}.
