= Francisco Cerúndolo =

Argentine tennis player (born 1998)

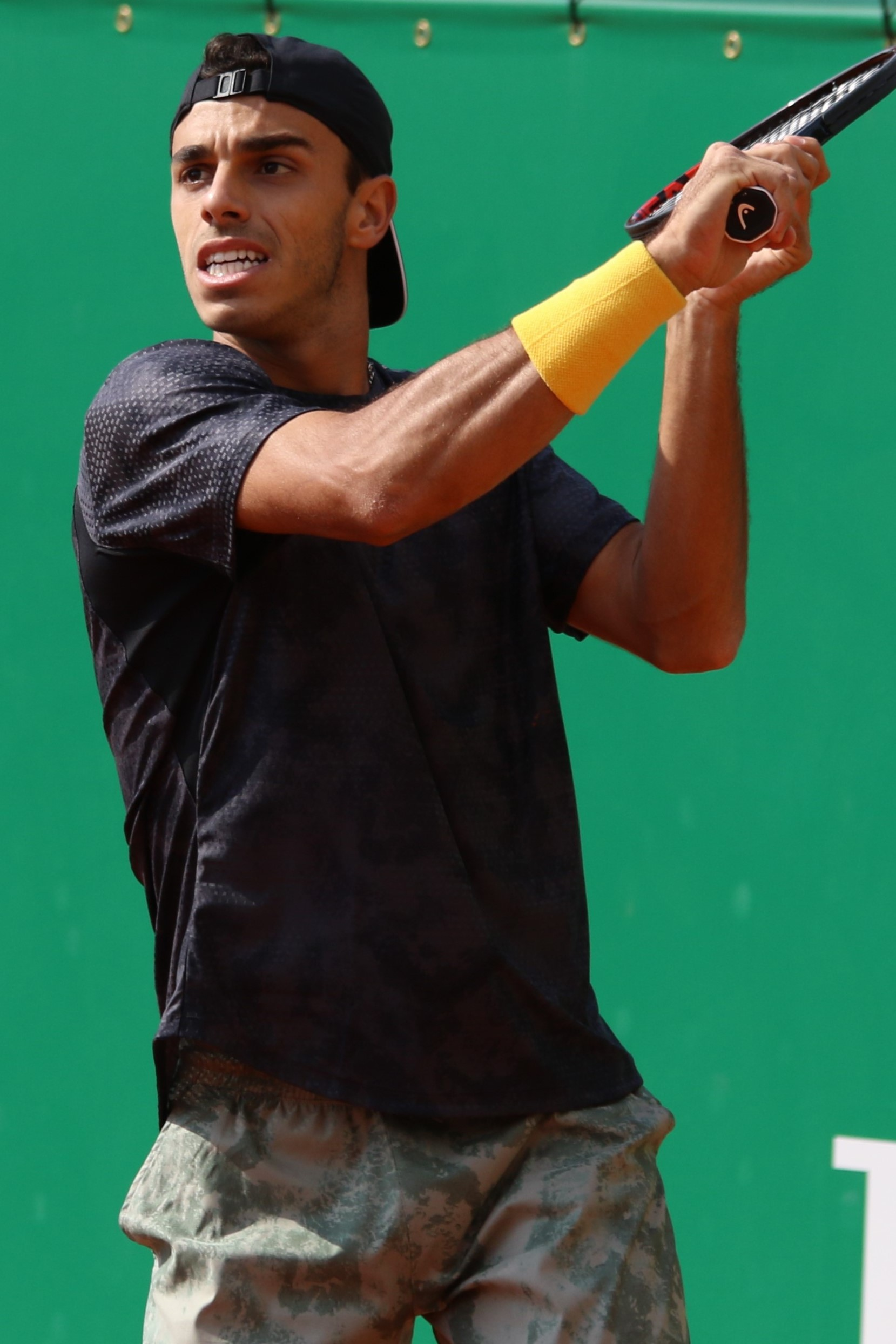
- Cerúndolo at the 2023 Monte-Carlo Masters
- Country (sports): Argentina
- Born: 13 August 1998 (age 28) Buenos Aires, Argentina
- Height: 1.85 m (6 ft 1 in)
- Turned pro: 2018
- Plays: Right-handed (two-handed backhand)
- Coach: Nicolás Massú (June 2026),Pablo Cuevas
- Prize money: US $12,810,306

Singles
- Career record: 178–137
- Career titles: 5
- Highest ranking: No. 18 (5 May 2025)
- Current ranking: No. 20 (9 November 2026)

Grand Slam singles results
- Australian Open: 4R (2026)
- French Open: 4R (2023, 2024)
- Wimbledon: 2R (2023)
- US Open: 4R (2026)

Other tournaments
- Olympic Games: 3R (2024)

Doubles
- Career record: 20–59
- Career titles: 0
- Highest ranking: No. 120 (16 November 2026)
- Current ranking: No. 120 (16 November 2026)

Grand Slam doubles results
- Australian Open: 2R (2026)
- French Open: 1R (2022, 2026)
- Wimbledon: 1R (2022, 2023)
- US Open: 1R (2024, 2026)
Medal record
Men's tennis
Representing Argentina
South American Games
Silver medal – second place	2018 Cochabamba	Men's singles
- Last updated on: 16 November 2026.

Francisco Cerúndolo (Note: Latin American Spanish pronunciation: [fɾanˈsisko seˈɾundolo]) (Italian: [tʃeˈrundolo]; born 13 August 1998) is an Argentine professional tennis player. He has a career-high ATP singles ranking of world No. 18 achieved on 5 May 2025 and a doubles ranking of No. 120 achieved on 16 November 2026. He is the current No. 1 singles player from Argentina and Latin America.

Cerúndolo has won five ATP Tour singles titles. He represents Argentina at the Davis Cup. At the Grand Slam level, Cerúndolo earned his first wins at the 2023 Australian Open and at the French Open, where he reached the third and fourth rounds, respectively.

After turning professional in 2018, Cerúndolo made his debut on the ATP Tour at the 2019 Argentina Open, the event at which he later broke through on tour in 2021 after reaching his first ATP singles final and becoming the first qualifier to contend for the title in 20 years. In 2022, Cerúndolo hit several more milestones: emerging into the top 100 in singles, reaching his first ATP Masters 1000 semifinal in Miami in his first Masters main draw, and winning his first ATP title at the Swedish Open, all of which sealed him a year-end top-30 ranking.

Cerúndolo is the older brother of fellow tennis player Juan Manuel Cerúndolo. In 2021, with the Córdoba Open followed by the Argentina Open, the Cerúndolos became the first siblings to reach consecutive finals on the ATP Tour since Alexander Zverev and Mischa Zverev in 2017. In 2022, they also became the first brothers to be ranked inside the top 100 in singles since the Zverev brothers in 2019.

== Career ==
=== 2019–2020: ATP Tour debut ===
Cerúndolo made his ATP main draw debut on home soil at the 2019 Argentina Open in Buenos Aires after receiving a wildcard for the singles main draw, losing to Guido Pella in three sets.

Cerúndolo played another ATP main draw a year later at the 2020 Argentina Open in Buenos Aires after receiving a wildcard for the singles main draw again, losing to Laslo Djere in the first round.

=== 2021: Major and Olympics debuts, first home final ===
In January 2021, he was one of two players to test positive for COVID-19 during the Australian Open qualifying event in Doha.

Cerúndolo reached his first ATP tour final at the 2021 Argentina Open as a qualifier but was defeated by world No. 9 Diego Schwartzman. He was the first qualifier to reach the final in Buenos Aires since José Acasuso in 2001. At the time, Acasuso was coached by Cerúndolo's father, Alejandro Cerúndolo.

Cerúndolo made his main draw debut in a Grand Slam at the 2021 French Open as a lucky loser, where he lost to Thiago Monteiro.

He qualified to represent Argentina at the 2020 Summer Olympics.

=== 2022: ATP 1000 semifinal, maiden title, top 30 ===
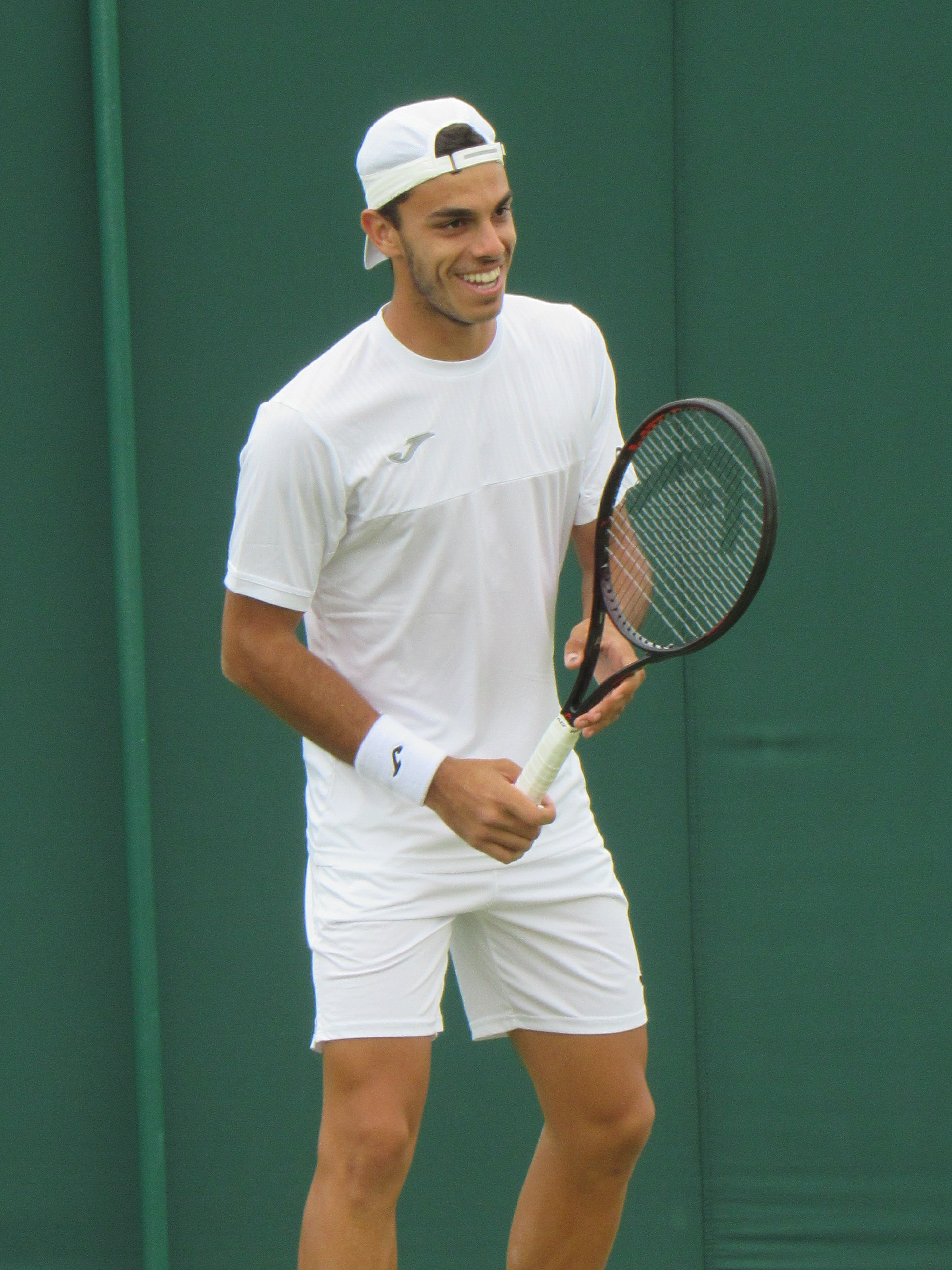
Cerundolo at the 2022 Wimbledon Championships

At the 2022 Argentina Open, Cerúndolo reached the quarterfinals of his home tournament as a qualifier defeating Miomir Kecmanović. As a result, he reached the top 100 in the singles rankings, joining Juan Manuel Cerúndolo as the first brothers in the Top 100 at the same time since Alexander Zverev and Mischa Zverev in May 2019. Cerúndolo received a special exempt into the tournament in Rio de Janeiro the following week. There, he beat Benoît Paire, Roberto Carballés Baena and again Kecmanović to reach his first ATP 500 semifinal, where he lost in straight sets to Diego Schwartzman.

Cerúndolo recorded his first ATP Tour victories on a hard court at the Masters 1000 event in Miami, defeating Tallon Griekspoor and seeded players Reilly Opelka and Gaël Monfils en route to the fourth round. He beat Frances Tiafoe (who defeated his brother Juan Manuel in the third round) in the fourth round to advance to the quarterfinals. He advanced to the semifinals after Jannik Sinner retired during their match due to foot blisters. Ranked World No. 103 at the time, he became the lowest-ranked semifinalist in the history of the Miami Open, and also became the first male player since Jerzy Janowicz in 2012 to reach the semifinals on their Masters 1000 level debut. He lost to 6th seed Casper Ruud in the semifinals in straight sets. Following this result, his ranking rose 52 places to a career-high of World No. 51.

In Båstad, Cerúndolo recorded his first win against a player inside the Top-10 after beating top seed and defending champion Casper Ruud in 3 sets. He proceeded to reach the final after beating Aslan Karatsev and Pablo Carreño Busta. He defeated Sebastián Báez in the final to win his first ATP title. As a result, he reached the top 30 on 18 July 2022 and the top 25 a week later.

At the 2022 Hamburg European Open, he reached the quarterfinals defeating World No. 8 and second seed Andrey Rublev, his second Top-10 win. He reached his second ATP 500 semifinal by beating Aslan Karatsev in three sets.

He represented Argentina for the first time in the Davis Cup finals, where he lost both matches to Jannik Sinner and Borna Ćorić respectively.

=== 2023: First major win, Latin American No. 1, top 20 ===
Cerúndolo won his two first matches at a Grand Slam at the Australian Open after beating Guido Pella and Corentin Moutet to reach the third round on his debut at this Major. He played again in the Davis Cup, this time recording his first win in the tournament against Otto Virtanen.

In Córdoba, Argentina he defeated fellow Argentine Federico Delbonis to reach the quarterfinals but lost to eventual runner-up compatriot Federico Coria, however, his brother Juanma defeated Diego Schwartzman in the same tournament, as a result, Francisco he became Argentine No. 1 and Latin American No. 1 player on 13 February 2023. In Buenos Aires, Argentina he defeated Yannick Hanfmann and Jaume Munar to reach back to back quarterfinals but lost to Bernabé Zapata Miralles. At the 2023 Rio Open he reached the round of 16 but lost again to Zapata Miralles. In Santiago he lost to eventual finalist fellow Argentine Tomás Martín Etcheverry in the first round.

In Miami he reached the fourth round again at this tournament, recording his first top-10 win of the season against fifth seed and world No. 6 Félix Auger-Aliassime and getting his revenge for his third round loss at the 2023 BNP Paribas Open two weeks earlier. He reached back-to-back quarterfinals at this tournament defeating Lorenzo Sonego.

In Barcelona he defeated world No. 3 Casper Ruud in the third round, his second top-10 win to reach the quarterfinals. In Madrid he lost in the second round to compatriot Pedro Cachin having a bye in the first round. In Rome he reached his second Masters quarterfinal of the season defeating Wu Yibing, Grégoire Barrère and world No. 8 Jannik Sinner, for his third top-10 win. In Lyon he reached a new ATP Tour final, beating Juan Pablo Varillas, Jack Draper, and Cameron Norrie, in the title match he lost against Arthur Fils in straight sets.

He picked up the third major win of his career at the French Open, where he defeated Jaume Munar in four sets. Next he defeated lucky loser Yannick Hanfmann. He reached the round of 16 for the first time at a Major defeating ninth seed Taylor Fritz, his fourth top-10 win of the season. He lost to sixth seed Holger Rune in five sets with a fifth set tiebreaker. As a result, he reached the top 20 in the rankings on 12 June 2023.

In Eastbourne he became the third Argentinian champion on grass after Guillermo Vilas and Javier Frana, and the first since 1995, defeating Marc-Andrea Hüsler, Zhang Zhizhen, Mackenzie McDonald and second seed Tommy Paul, beating both Americans in the same day. He recorded his first win at the 2023 Wimbledon Championships defeating Nuno Borges.

On his return to clay at Båstad, he started his title defense beating Luca Van Assche in the second round, Federico Coria in the quarterfinals, but lost in the semifinals to eventual champion Andrey Rublev.

At the US Open he beat Zachary Svajda in the first round, his first win at this Major. On his debut at the Laver Cup he recorded the first ever win for South America at the event against Alejandro Davidovich Fokina. In Paris he reached the third round defeating Gaël Monfils and world No. 8 Casper Ruud, for his fifth top-10 win of the season.

=== 2024: Third ATP 500 semifinal, 100th win ===
Cerúndolo's start of the season in the Australian Open Series began with three defeats in second rounds, first at Hong Kong Open, then at the ASB Classic, and the last at the Australian Open, where he lost against Fábián Marozsán in straight sets.

He was called up again for Argentina to play at the Davis Cup qualifying round, this time against Kazakhstan, he won the first match of the series against Dimitry Popko, giving his country the first point, after the defeat over Tomás Martín Etcheverry and the victory over González/Molteni, Francisco lost against Timofey Skatov leaving the series 2-2, however, Sebastián Báez won against Popko and Argentina won the series 3–2, qualifying for the David Cup Finals.

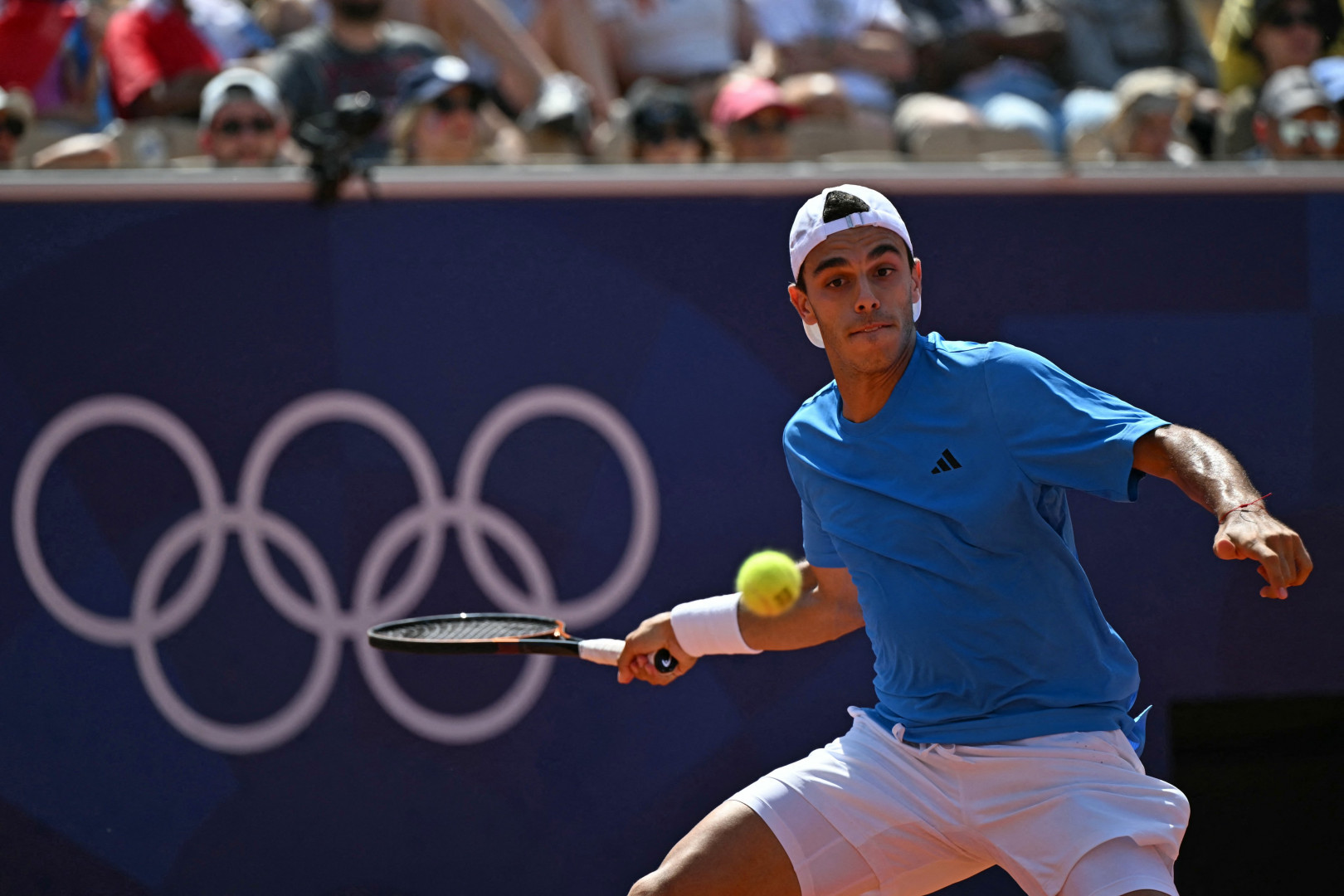
Cerúndolo at the 2024 Paris Olympics

Seeded fourth, he reached the semifinals at the ATP 500 2024 Rio Open for the second time at this tournament, but lost to fifth seed and eventual champion Sebastian Baez. He reached his fifth ATP final at the 2024 Croatia Open Umag defeating Lorenzo Sonego and upsetting top seed Andrey Rublev. He won his third title defeating 2nd seed Lorenzo Musetti in three sets.

In less than 24 hours, he recorded his first win at the Paris Olympics over Chilean Tomás Barrios Vera. He then defeated 10th seed Ugo Humbert but lost to Casper Ruud in straight sets.

Seeded fourth, he reached the semifinals at the 2024 Almaty Open, but lost to Gabriel Diallo. At the 2024 Rolex Paris Masters Cerundolo again upset sixth seed Andrey Rublev in straight sets with two tiebreaks recording his 100th tour-level win. It was his fourth Top 10 win of the season and second over Rublev (after Umag).

=== 2025: Back-to-back Masters quarterfinals & first clay semifinal ===
Cerúndolo reached the final at his home tournament, the 2025 Argentina Open, defeating top seed Alexander Zverev en route, but lost in straight sets to João Fonseca, who became the youngest Brazilian to win an ATP title in the Open Era. At the 2025 Chile Open as the top seed, he reached his second semifinal at the Golden swing with a win over compatriot Tomás Martín Etcheverry.

At the 2025 BNP Paribas Open in Indian Wells he reached the quarterfinals of a Masters for the fifth time in his career and first at the tournament, defeating ninth seed Alex de Minaur, his 13th top 10 win, before losing to Carlos Alcaraz. In Miami he defeated Alexandre Müller, 12th seed Tommy Paul and fifth seed Casper Ruud, his 14th top 10 win, to reach back to back quarterfinals. It was his third quarterfinal in four appearances at the hardcourt Masters in Miami.

Cerundolo reached also the quarterfinals at the Masters 1000 2025 Mutua Madrid Open with another win over top seed Alexander Zverev, his second clay win over the German player in the season (after Buenos Aires), bringing their head-to-head to 3–0. He reached only his second Masters semifinal and first on clay with a win over 22nd seed Jakub Menšík. He lost to 14th seed Casper Ruud in straight sets.

=== 2026: First ATP 500 title ===
At the 2026 Australian Open, Cerúndolo entered as the 18th seed and in the third round, he defeated 13th seed Andrey Rublev in straight sets, reached fourth round for the first time, before falling down in straight sets to the third seed Alexander Zverev.

At the Argentina Open, he reached back-to-back finals defeating Hugo Dellien, Vít Kopřiva, and seventh seed Tomás Martín Etcheverry. He won his fourth title defeating second seed Luciano Darderi in straight sets.

At the 2026 Queen's Club Championships, Cerundolo came from a set down to defeat Tommy Paul in London and clinch the biggest title of his career and second on grass. As a result, he moved back to the top 25 at world No. 21 in the singles rankings on 22 June 2026.

== Personal life ==
His younger brother, Juan Manuel, is also a tennis player. Juan Manuel was also in his first final and won his first title at the 2021 Córdoba Open one week before his brother's final. The Cerúndolos became the first brothers to reach consecutive finals on the ATP Tour since 2017, when Alexander Zverev won the title in Rome and Mischa Zverev reached the final in Geneva. In Córdoba, Francisco contested the first ATP Tour event in which his brother was also competing, making them the first Argentine brothers in 40 years to appear in the same tournament. The brothers also reached the third round of the 2026 French Open the same day, marking the third time in the Open Era that this occurred, following Gene Mayer and Sandy Mayer in 1979, and the Zverev brothers in 2018.

His younger sister María Constanza is a field hockey player, who plays at Belgrano Athletic Club and the Argentina national team, his father Alejandro "Toto" Cerúndolo is a former tennis player and coach, and his mother María Luz Rodríguez is a sport therapist and was also a tennis player.

Cerúndolo and his siblings are River Plate fans.

== Performance timelines ==
Key
W	F	SF	QF	#R	RR	Q#	DNQ	A	NH

(W) winner; (F) finalist; (SF) semifinalist; (QF) quarterfinalist; (#R) rounds 4, 3, 2, 1; (RR) round-robin stage; (Q#) qualification round; (DNQ) did not qualify; (A) absent; (NH) not held; (SR) strike rate (events won / competed); (W–L) win–loss record.
To avoid confusion and double counting, these charts are updated at the conclusion of a tournament or when the player's participation has ended.

=== Singles ===
Tournament	2021	2022	2023	2024	2025	2026	SR	W–L	Win %
Grand Slam tournaments
Australian Open	Q2	Q1	3R	2R	3R	4R	0 / 4	8–4	67%
French Open	1R	1R	4R	4R	1R	3R	0 / 6	8–6	57%
Wimbledon	Q3	1R	2R	1R	1R	1R	0 / 5	1–5	17%
US Open	Q3	1R	2R	2R	2R	4R	0 / 5	6–5	55%
Win–loss	0–1	0–3	7–4	5–4	3–4	8–4	0 / 20	23–20	53%
National representation
Davis Cup	A	RR	WG1	QF	QF		0 / 3	7–5	58%
Summer Olympics	1R	NH		3R	NH		0 / 2	2–2	50%
ATP 1000 tournaments
Indian Wells Open	A	Q1	3R	3R	QF	3R	0 / 4	6–4	60%
Miami Open	A	SF	QF	3R	QF	QF	0 / 5	15–5	75%
Monte-Carlo Masters	A	A	2R	2R	2R	2R	0 / 4	4–4	50%
Madrid Open	A	Q1	2R	QF	SF	4R	0 / 4	9–4	69%
Italian Open	A	1R	QF	3R	4R	3R	0 / 5	7–5	58%
Canadian Open	A	1R	2R	A	4R	2R	0 / 4	3–4	43%
Cincinnati Open	A	1R	1R	1R	A	2R	0 / 4	0–4	0%
Shanghai Masters	NH		4R	2R	3R	3R	0 / 1	4–4	50%
Paris Masters	A	1R	3R	3R	3R	1R	0 / 5	6–5	55%
Win–loss	0–0	5–5	13–9	9–8	18–8	9–8	0 / 39	54–39	58%
Career statistics
Tournaments (Note: 2019 ATP Tournaments: 1) (Note: 2020 ATP Tournaments: 1)	8	14	25	30	23	18	Career total: 120		
Titles	0	1	1	1	0	2	Career total: 5		
Finals	1	1	2	1	1	2	Career total: 8		
Overall win–loss	5–8	23–22	39–26	35–31	38–25	28–16	168–130		
Win %	38%	51%	60%	53%	60%	64%	56%		
Year-end ranking	127	30	21	30	21		$11,095,229		

=== Doubles ===
Tournament	2022	2023	2024	2025	SR	W–L	Win%
Grand Slam tournaments
Australian Open	A	1R	1R	1R	0 / 3	0–3	0%
French Open	1R	A	A	A	0 / 1	0–1	0%
Wimbledon	1R	1R	A	A	0 / 2	0–2	0%
US Open	A	A	1R	A	0 / 1	0–1	0%
Win–loss	0–2	0–2	0–2	0–1	0 / 7	0–7	0%
ATP 1000 tournaments
Indian Wells Open	A	1R	A	A	0 / 1	0–0	–
Miami Open	A	1R	1R	1R	0 / 3	0–3	0%
Monte-Carlo Masters	A	1R	1R	1R	0 / 3	0–3	0%
Madrid Open	A	A	A	A	0 / 0	0–0	–
Italian Open	A	A	QF	1R	0 / 2	2–2	50%
Canadian Open	1R	1R	A	A	0 / 2	0–2	0%
Cincinnati Open	1R	1R	R1	A	0 / 3	0–3	0%
Shanghai Masters	NH	1R	1R	2R	0 / 3	1–2	33%
Paris Masters	A	1R	1R	2R	0 / 3	1–3	25%
Win–loss	0–2	0–5	2–6	2–5	0 / 20	4–18	18%

== ATP Tour finals ==
=== Singles: 8 (5 titles, 3 runner-ups) ===
Legend Grand Slam (–) ATP 1000 (–) ATP 500 (1–0) ATP 250 (4–3)	Finals by surface Hard (–) Clay (3–3) Grass (2–0)	Finals by setting Outdoor (5–3) Indoor (–)

Result	W–L	Date	Tournament	Tier	Surface	Opponent	Score
Loss	0–1	Mar 2021	Argentina Open, Argentina	ATP 250	Clay	(Argentina) Diego Schwartzman	1–6, 2–6
Win	1–1	Jul 2022	Swedish Open, Sweden	ATP 250	Clay	(Argentina) Sebastián Báez	7–6^{(7–4)}, 6–2
Loss	1–2	May 2023	Lyon Open, France	ATP 250	Clay	(France) Arthur Fils	3–6, 5–7
Win	2–2	Jun 2023	Eastbourne International, UK	ATP 250	Grass	(United States) Tommy Paul	6–4, 1–6, 6–4
Win	3–2	Jul 2024	Croatia Open, Croatia	ATP 250	Clay	(Italy) Lorenzo Musetti	2–6, 6–4, 7–6^{(7–5)}
Loss	3–3	Feb 2025	Argentina Open, Argentina	ATP 250	Clay	(Brazil) João Fonseca	4–6, 6–7^{(1–7)}
Win	4–3	Feb 2026	Argentina Open, Argentina	ATP 250	Clay	(Italy) Luciano Darderi	6–4, 6–2
Win	5–3	Jun 2026	Queen's Club Championships, UK	ATP 500	Grass	(United States) Tommy Paul	6–7^{(4–7)}, 6–4, 6–3

== National representation ==
=== Laver Cup: 3 (2 titles, 1 runner-up) ===
Result	Date	Tournament	Surface	Team	Captains	Partners	Opponent team	Opp. captains	Opponents	Score
Win	Sep 2023	Vancouver, Canada	Hard (i)	Team World	John McEnroe; Patrick McEnroe	Taylor Fritz; Frances Tiafoe; Tommy Paul; Félix Auger-Aliassime; Ben Shelton	Team Europe	Björn Borg; Thomas Enqvist	Andrey Rublev; Casper Ruud; Hubert Hurkacz; Alejandro Davidovich Fokina; Arthur Fils; Gaël Monfils	13–2
Loss	Sep 2024	Berlin, Germany	Hard (i)	Team World	John McEnroe; Patrick McEnroe	Taylor Fritz; Frances Tiafoe; Ben Shelton; Alejandro Tabilo; Thanasi Kokkinakis	Team Europe	Björn Borg; Thomas Enqvist	Alexander Zverev; Carlos Alcaraz; Daniil Medvedev; Casper Ruud; Grigor Dimitrov; Stefanos Tsitsipas	11–13
Win	Sep 2025	San Francisco, US	Hard (i)	Team World	Andre Agassi; Pat Rafter	Taylor Fritz; Alex de Minaur; Alex Michelsen; João Fonseca; Reilly Opelka	Team Europe	Yannick Noah; Tim Henman	Carlos Alcaraz; Alexander Zverev; Holger Rune; Casper Ruud; Jakub Menšík; Flavio Cobolli	15–9

== ATP Challenger Tour finals ==
=== Singles: 6 (5 titles, 1 runner-up) ===
Finals by surface
Hard (–)
Clay (5–1)

Result	W–L	Date	Tournament	Surface	Opponent	Score
Win	1–0	Oct 2020	Split Open, Croatia	Clay	(Portugal) Pedro Sousa	4–6, 6–3, 7–6^{(7–4)}
Win	2–0	Nov 2020	Guayaquil Challenger, Ecuador	Clay	(Slovakia) Andrej Martin	6–4, 3–6, 6–2
Win	3–0	Dec 2020	Internacional de Campinas, Brazil	Clay	(Spain) Roberto Carballés Baena	6–4, 3–6, 6–3
Loss	3–1	Feb 2021	Challenger Concepción, Chile	Clay	(Argentina) Sebastián Báez	3–6, 7–6^{(7–5)}, 6–7^{(5–7)}
Win	4–1	Aug 2021	Internazionali di Venezia, Italy	Clay	(Argentina) Tomás Martín Etcheverry	6–1, 6–2
Win	5–1	Jan 2022	Santa Cruz Challenger, Bolivia	Clay	(Argentina) Camilo Ugo Carabelli	6–4, 6–3

=== Doubles: 1 (runner-up) ===
Result	W–L	Date	Tournament	Surface	Partner	Opponents	Score
Loss	0–1	Jan 2022	Challenger Concepción, Chile	Clay	(Argentina) Camilo Ugo Carabelli	(Ecuador) Diego Hidalgo (Colombia) Cristian Rodríguez	2–6, 0–6

== ITF Tour finals ==
=== Singles: 10 (8 titles, 2 runner-ups) ===
Finals by surface
Hard (1–0)
Clay (7–2)

Result	W–L	Date	Tournament	Surface	Opponent	Score
Loss	0–1	Sep 2018	F6 Buenos Aires, Argentina	Clay	(Argentina) Gonzalo Villanueva	0–6, 3–6
Win	1–1	Oct 2018	F5 Mogi das Cruzes, Brazil	Clay	(Brazil) Daniel Dutra da Silva	6–2, 6–4
Win	2–1	Oct 2018	F6 Curitiba, Brazil	Clay	(Brazil) Felipe Meligeni Alves	7–6^{(7–3)}, 6–2
Win	3–1	Jan 2019	M15 Manacor, Spain	Clay	(Russia) Ivan Gakhov	6–3, 6–3
Win	4–1	Jan 2019	M15 Palmanova, Spain	Clay	(Switzerland) Sandro Ehrat	2–6, 6–2, 6–3
Win	5–1	May 2019	M15 Buenos Aires, Argentina	Clay	(Argentina) Genaro Alberto Olivieri	7–6^{(7–2)}, 7–6^{(8–6)}
Win	6–1	Jun 2019	M25 Kiseljak, Bosnia and Herzegovina	Clay	(Australia) Christopher O'Connell	3–6, 6–2, [10–4]
Loss	6–2	Jul 2019	M25 Buenos Aires, Argentina	Clay	(Argentina) Juan Pablo Ficovich	5–7, 7–6^{(7–5)}, 3–6
Win	7–2	Jan 2019	M25 Lima, Peru	Clay	(Peru) Nicolás Álvarez	6–2, 6–1
Win	8–2	Jan 2020	M25 Los Angeles, US	Hard	(United States) Alexander Ritschard	6–3, 6–3

=== Doubles: 2 (1 title, 1 runner-up) ===
Result	W–L	Date	Tournament	Surface	Partner	Opponents	Score
Win	1–0	Mar 2019	M15 Pinamar, Argentina	Clay	(Argentina) Hernán Casanova	(Peru) Arklon H. del Pino (Peru) Conner H. del Pino	7–6^{(9–7)}, 3–6, [10–5]
Loss	1–1	Jun 2019	M25 Kiseljak, Bosnia and Herzegovina	Clay	(Brazil) João Sorgi	(Latvia) Mārtiņš Podžus (Russia) Maxim Ratniuk	6–7^{(5–7)}, 2–6

== Wins over top 10 players ==
- Cerúndolo has a 17–25 (40.48%) record against players who were, at the time the match was played, ranked in the top 10.

Season	2022	2023	2024	2025	2026	Total
Wins	2	5	4	4	2	17

#	Player	Rk	Event	Surface	Rd	Score	Rk	Ref
2022
1.	(Norway) Casper Ruud	5	Swedish Open, Sweden	Clay	2R	6–4, 3–6, 7–5	39	
2.	Andrey Rublev	8	Hamburg Open, Germany	Clay	2R	6–4, 6–2	30	
2023
3.	(Canada) Félix Auger-Aliassime	6	Miami Open, United States	Hard	3R	6–2, 7–5	31	
4.	(Norway) Casper Ruud	3	Barcelona Open, Spain	Clay	3R	7–6^{(7–5)}, 6–3	32	
5.	(Italy) Jannik Sinner	8	Italian Open, Italy	Clay	4R	6–7^{(3–7)}, 6–2, 6–2	31	
6.	(United States) Taylor Fritz	8	French Open, France	Clay	3R	3–6, 6–3, 6–4, 7–5	23	
7.	(Norway) Casper Ruud	8	Paris Masters, France	Hard (i)	2R	7–5, 6–4	21	
2024
8.	(Germany) Alexander Zverev	5	Madrid Open, Spain	Clay	4R	6–3, 6–4	22	
9.	Andrey Rublev	9	Croatia Open Umag, Croatia	Clay	SF	7–6^{(8–6)}, 6–4	37	
10.	(Norway) Casper Ruud	9	Laver Cup, Germany	Hard (i)	RR	6–4, 6–4	31	
11.	Andrey Rublev	7	Paris Masters, France	Hard (i)	2R	7–6^{(8–6)}, 7–6^{(7–5)}	29	
2025
12.	(Germany) Alexander Zverev	2	Argentina Open, Argentina	Clay	QF	3–6, 6–3, 6–2	28	
13.	(Australia) Alex de Minaur	10	Indian Wells Open, United States	Hard	4R	7–5, 6–3	26	
14.	(Norway) Casper Ruud	6	Miami Open, United States	Hard	4R	6–4, 6–2	24	
15.	(Germany) Alexander Zverev	2	Madrid Open, Spain	Clay	4R	7–5, 6–3	21	
2026
16.	Daniil Medvedev	10	Miami Open, United States	Hard	3R	6–0, 4–6, 7–5	19	
17.	(United States) Taylor Fritz	10	US Open, United States	Hard	3R	3–6, 4–6, 6–3, 6–4, 6–4	25	
