= Seita Watanabe =

Japanese tennis player (born 2000)

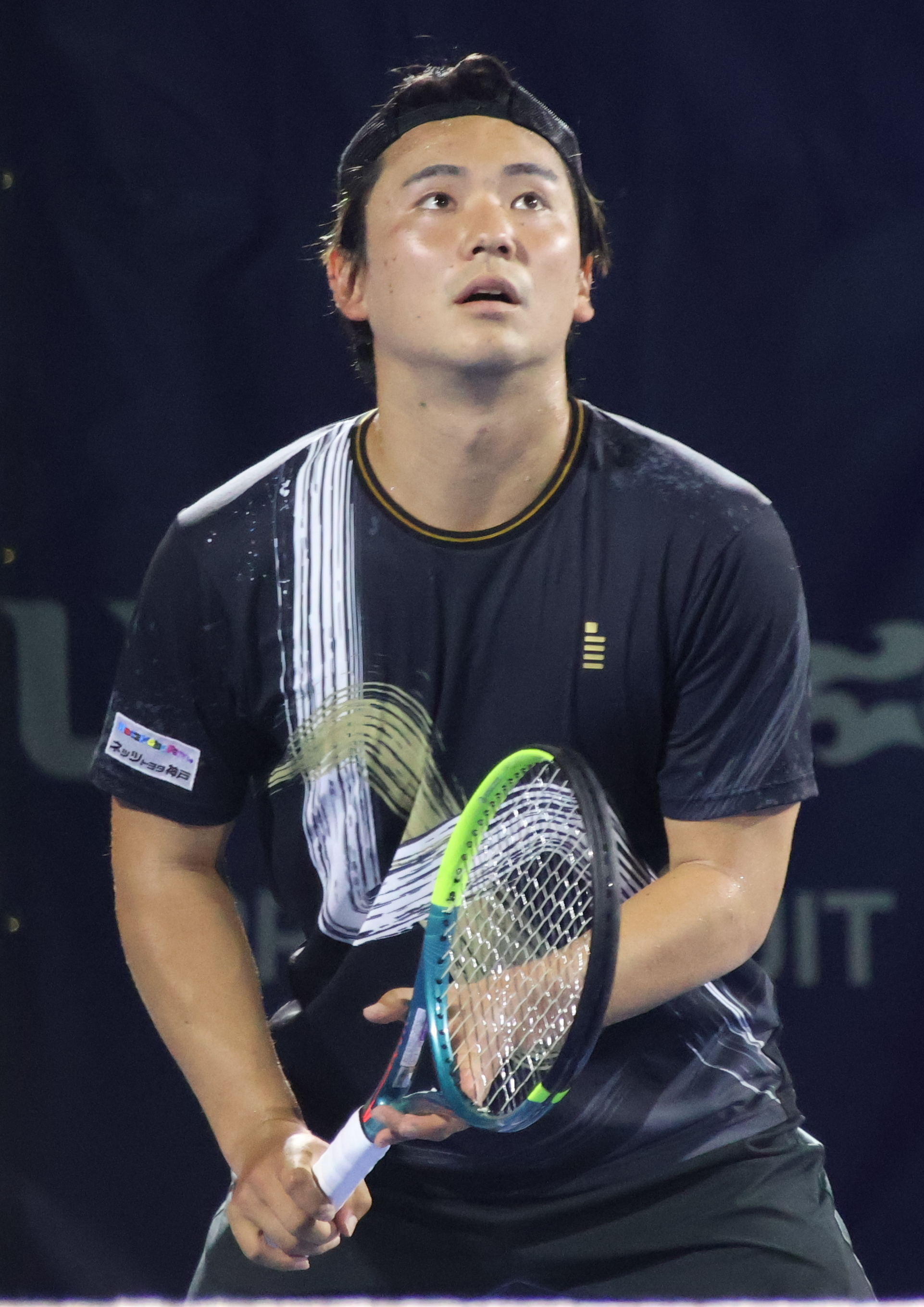
- Watanabe in 2026
- Country (sports): Japan
- Born: 25 December 2000 (age 25) Fukushima, Japan
- Height: 1.80 m (5 ft 11 in)
- Plays: Right-handed (two-handed backhand)
- Prize money: $105,802

Singles
- Career record: 0–0 (at ATP Tour level, Grand Slam level, and in Davis Cup)
- Career titles: 0
- Highest ranking: No. 824 (18 November 2024)
- Current ranking: No. 1656 (2 March 2026)

Doubles
- Career record: 1–3 (at ATP Tour level, Grand Slam level, and in Davis Cup)
- Career titles: 2 Challengers, 10 ITF
- Highest ranking: No. 123 (13 October 2025)
- Current ranking: No. 124 (2 March 2026)

Grand Slam doubles results
- Australian Open: 1R (2025)
- Last updated on: 2 March 2026.

Seita Watanabe (渡邉 聖太, Watanabe Seita; born 25 December 2000) is a Japanese tennis player who specializes in doubles. He has a career high ATP doubles ranking of world No. 135 achieved on 16 June 2025.

== Career ==
Watanabe made his ATP main draw debut at the 2023 Japan Open Tennis Championships after entering the doubles main draw with Takeru Yuzuki as lucky losers.

Watanabe made his Grand Slam main draw debut at the 2025 Australian Open after entering the doubles main draw with Takeru Yuzuki as a wildcard pair.
