= Challenger Concepción =

Tennis tournament in Chile

- 2025 Challenger Concepción

ATP Challenger Tour
- Event name: Challenger Concepción
- Location: Concepción, Chile
- Venue: Club de Campo Bellavista
- Category: ATP Challenger 100 (2026-)
- Surface: Clay
- Draw: 32S/24Q/16D
- Prize money: $100,000 (2025), $41,000 (2024), $130,000 (2023), $53,120 (2022)

Current champions (2025)
- Singles: (United States) Emilio Nava
- Doubles: (United States) Vasil Kirkov (Chile) Matías Soto

The Challenger Concepción, known as Challenger Dove Men+Care Concepción, is a professional tennis tournament played on clay courts. It is currently part of the ATP Challenger Tour. It is held in Concepción, Chile, since 2021.

== Past finals ==
=== Singles ===
Year	Champion	Runner-up	Score
2026	(Paraguay) Daniel Vallejo	(Chile) Alejandro Tabilo	6–2, 1–6, 6–1
2025	(United States) Emilio Nava	(Argentina) Nicolás Kicker	6–1, 7–6^{(7–3)}
2024	(Peru) Gonzalo Bueno	(Argentina) Juan Pablo Ficovich	6–4, 6–0
2023	(Argentina) Federico Coria	(Kazakhstan) Timofey Skatov	6–4, 6–3
2022	(Colombia) Daniel Elahi Galán	(Argentina) Santiago Rodríguez Taverna	6–1, 3–6, 6–3
2021	(Argentina) Sebastián Báez	(Argentina) Francisco Cerúndolo	6–3, 6–7^{(5–7)}, 7–6^{(7–5)}

=== Doubles ===
Year	Champions	Runners-up	Score
2026	(Ecuador) Gonzalo Escobar (Brazil) Eduardo Ribeiro	(Argentina) Mariano Kestelboim (Brazil) Marcelo Zormann	7–6^{(7–4)}, 6–4
2025	(United States) Vasil Kirkov (Chile) Matías Soto	(Japan) Seita Watanabe (Japan) Takeru Yuzuki	6–2, 6–4
2024	(Japan) Seita Watanabe (Japan) Takeru Yuzuki	(Australia) Patrick Harper (United Kingdom) David Stevenson	6–4, 7–6^{(8–6)}
2023	(Argentina) Guido Andreozzi (Argentina) Guillermo Durán	(Italy) Luciano Darderi (Ukraine) Oleg Prihodko	7–6^{(7–1)}, 6–7^{(3–7)}, [10–7]
2022	(Ecuador) Diego Hidalgo (Colombia) Cristian Rodríguez	(Argentina) Francisco Cerúndolo (Argentina) Camilo Ugo Carabelli	6–2, 6–0
2021	(Brazil) Orlando Luz (Brazil) Rafael Matos	(Peru) Sergio Galdós (Ecuador) Diego Hidalgo	7–5, 6–4
