= 2026 Oeiras Indoors II – Doubles =

Doubles
- 2026 Oeiras Indoors II

Final
- Champions: (Czech Republic) Filip Duda (Czech Republic) Zdeněk Kolář
- Runners-up: (Sweden) Erik Grevelius (Sweden) Adam Heinonen
- Score: 6–3, 6–4

Events
Singles	Doubles
- Oeiras Indoors

Cleeve Harper and David Stevenson were the defending champions but lost in the semifinals to Erik Grevelius and Adam Heinonen.

Filip Duda and Zdeněk Kolář won the title after defeating Grevelius and Heinonen 6–3, 6–4 in the final.

== Seeds ==
1. (Denmark) Johannes Ingildsen / (Netherlands) Mick Veldheer (first round)
2. (Canada) Cleeve Harper / (United Kingdom) David Stevenson (semifinals)
3. (Bulgaria) Alexander Donski / (Serbia) Stefan Latinović (first round)
4. (Czech Republic) Filip Duda / (Czech Republic) Zdeněk Kolář (champions)

== Draw ==
Key

- Q = Qualifier
- WC = Wild card
- LL = Lucky loser
- Alt = Alternate
- ITF = ITF entry
- PR = Protected ranking
- SR = Special ranking
- SE = Special exempt
- JE = Junior exempt
- JR = Junior Accelerator Programme entrant
- CO = College Accelerator Programme entrant
- NG = Next Gen Accelerator Program entrant
- w/o = Walkover
- r = Retired
- d = Defaulted

First round
1	(Denmark) J Ingildsen (Netherlands) M Veldheer	7	2	[5]
Alt	(Japan) K Uchida (Kazakhstan) D Yevseyev	5	6	[10]
(France) M Westphal (United States) T Winegar	w/o
WC	(Portugal) João Silva (Portugal) T Torres
4	(Czech Republic) F Duda (Czech Republic) Z Kolář	6	6
(Spain) M Damas (Colombia) A Soriano Barrera	4	0
(Portugal) Francisco Rocha (Portugal) H Rocha	3	6	[4]
(United States) M Damm (Czech Republic) M Vrbenský	6	2	[10]
(Denmark) A Holmgren (Poland) S Walków	1	3
(Sweden) E Grevelius (Sweden) A Heinonen	6	6
(Portugal) G Elias (Portugal) T Pereira	0	7^{7}	[10]
3	(Bulgaria) A Donski (Serbia) S Latinović	6	6^{5}	[7]
(Spain) P Llamas Ruiz (Spain) B Winter López	6	6
WC	(Portugal) Gonçalo da Rosa Castro (Portugal) Salvador Monteiro	1	1
(Serbia) I Sabanov (Serbia) M Sabanov	6^{2}	6	[2]
2	(Canada) C Harper (United Kingdom) D Stevenson	7^{7}	1	[10]

Quarterfinals
Alt	(Japan) K Uchida (Kazakhstan) D Yevseyev	2	2
(France) M Westphal (United States) T Winegar	6	6
4	(Czech Republic) F Duda (Czech Republic) Z Kolář	6	6
(United States) M Damm (Czech Republic) M Vrbenský	4	2
(Sweden) E Grevelius (Sweden) A Heinonen	7^{7}	6
(Portugal) G Elias (Portugal) T Pereira	6^{2}	4
(Spain) P Llamas Ruiz (Spain) B Winter López	2	2
2	(Canada) C Harper (United Kingdom) D Stevenson	6	6

Semifinals
(France) M Westphal (United States) T Winegar	6	4	[7]
4	(Czech Republic) F Duda (Czech Republic) Z Kolář	4	6	[10]
(Sweden) E Grevelius (Sweden) A Heinonen	7^{7}	6^{3}	[10]
2	(Canada) C Harper (United Kingdom) D Stevenson	6^{5}	7^{7}	[8]

Final
4	(Czech Republic) F Duda (Czech Republic) Z Kolář	6	6
(Sweden) E Grevelius (Sweden) A Heinonen	3	4
