= 2024 Oeiras Indoors – Doubles =

Doubles
- 2024 Oeiras Indoors

Final
- Champions: (United Kingdom) Jay Clarke (United Kingdom) Marcus Willis
- Runners-up: (France) Théo Arribagé (Belgium) Michael Geerts
- Score: 6–4, 6–7^{(9–11)}, [10–3]

Events
Singles	Doubles
← 2023 ·	Oeiras Indoors	· 2024 →

Sander Arends and David Pel were the defending champions but chose not to defend their title.

Jay Clarke and Marcus Willis won the title after defeating Théo Arribagé and Michael Geerts 6–4, 6–7^{(9–11)}, [10–3] in the final.

== Seeds ==
1. (France) Théo Arribagé / (Belgium) Michael Geerts (final)
2. (Portugal) Jaime Faria / (Portugal) Henrique Rocha (quarterfinals)
3. (United Kingdom) Jay Clarke / (United Kingdom) Marcus Willis (champions)
4. (United Kingdom) Charles Broom / (United Kingdom) Mark Whitehouse (first round)

== Draw ==
Key

- Q = Qualifier
- WC = Wild card
- LL = Lucky loser
- Alt = Alternate
- ITF = ITF entry
- PR = Protected ranking
- SR = Special ranking
- SE = Special exempt
- JE = Junior exempt
- JR = Junior Accelerator Programme entrant
- CO = College Accelerator Programme entrant
- NG = Next Gen Accelerator Program entrant
- w/o = Walkover
- r = Retired
- d = Defaulted

First round
1	(France) T Arribagé (Belgium) M Geerts	6	7^{7}
(Poland) M Kaśnikowski (Ukraine) V Uzhylovskyi	3	6^{3}
(United States) T-S Kwiatkowski (United States) A Lawson	6	6^{0}	[6]
WC	(Portugal) J Domingues (Portugal) T Pereira	4	7^{7}	[10]
4	(United Kingdom) C Broom (United Kingdom) M Whitehouse	4	7^{7}	[4]
(Germany) S Fanselow (Germany) Lucas Gerch	6	6^{3}	[10]
(France) G Debru (France) T Lamasine	7^{9}	6
WC	(Portugal) Pedro Araújo (Portugal) F Gil	6^{7}	3
(Germany) Elmar Ejupovic (Ukraine) Vadym Ursu	6^{5}	1
(Denmark) J Ingildsen (United States) C Kingsley	7^{7}	6
(France) K de Schepper (Brazil) F Romboli	5	4
3	(United Kingdom) J Clarke (United Kingdom) M Willis	7	6
(Bulgaria) A Andreev (Czech Republic) M Vrbenský	6	6
(Portugal) Gonçalo Falcão (Italy) L Giustino	2	3
(Italy) Samuel Vincent Ruggeri (Italy) Augusto Virgili	6	3	[7]
2	(Portugal) J Faria (Portugal) H Rocha	3	6	[10]

Quarterfinals
1	(France) T Arribagé (Belgium) M Geerts	7	6
WC	(Portugal) J Domingues (Portugal) T Pereira	5	1
(Germany) S Fanselow (Germany) L Gerch	6^{12}	6	[10]
(France) G Debru (France) T Lamasine	7^{14}	4	[6]
(Denmark) J Ingildsen (United States) C Kingsley	3	6^{5}
3	(United Kingdom) J Clarke (United Kingdom) M Willis	6	7^{7}
(Bulgaria) A Andreev (Czech Republic) M Vrbenský	6	1	[10]
2	(Portugal) J Faria (Portugal) H Rocha	3	6	[6]

Semifinals
1	(France) T Arribagé (Belgium) M Geerts	6	3	[10]
(Germany) S Fanselow (Germany) L Gerch	3	6	[3]
3	(United Kingdom) J Clarke (United Kingdom) M Willis	6	6^{6}	[10]
(Bulgaria) A Andreev (Czech Republic) M Vrbenský	3	7^{8}	[2]

Final
1	(France) T Arribagé (Belgium) M Geerts	4	7^{11}	[3]
3	(United Kingdom) J Clarke (United Kingdom) M Willis	6	6^{9}	[10]
