= 2026 Oeiras Indoors – Singles =

Singles
- 2026 Oeiras Indoors

Final
- Champion: (Luxembourg) Chris Rodesch
- Runner-up: (Hungary) Zsombor Piros
- Score: 6–4, 4–6, 6–2

Events
Singles	Doubles
- Oeiras Indoors

Alexander Blockx was the defending champion but chose not to defend his title.

Chris Rodesch won the title after defeating Zsombor Piros 6–4, 4–6, 6–2 in the final.

== Seeds ==
1. (United Kingdom) Billy Harris (first round)
2. (United Kingdom) Jan Choinski (withdrew)
3. (Lithuania) Vilius Gaubas (semifinals)
4. (Italy) Francesco Passaro (quarterfinals)
5. (Portugal) Henrique Rocha (first round)
6. (Spain) Daniel Mérida (first round)
7. (Austria) Jurij Rodionov (second round)
8. (Colombia) Nicolás Mejía (second round)

== Draw ==
Key

- Q = Qualifier
- WC = Wild card
- LL = Lucky loser
- Alt = Alternate
- ITF = ITF entry
- PR = Protected ranking
- SR = Special ranking
- SE = Special exempt
- JE = Junior exempt
- JR = Junior Accelerator Programme entrant
- CO = College Accelerator Programme entrant
- NG = Next Gen Accelerator Program entrant
- w/o = Walkover
- r = Retired
- d = Defaulted

=== Finals ===
Semifinals
(Luxembourg) Chris Rodesch	7^{7}	7^{9}
3	(Lithuania) Vilius Gaubas	6^{5}	6^{7}
(Estonia) Daniil Glinka	5	6	1
(Hungary) Zsombor Piros	7	4	6

Final
(Luxembourg) Chris Rodesch	6	4	6
(Hungary) Zsombor Piros	4	6	2

=== Top half ===
First round
1	(United Kingdom) B Harris	4	6	3
WC	(Portugal) T Torres	6	4	6
(Bolivia) JC Prado Ángelo	2	4
(Germany) M Rosenkranz	6	6
(Denmark) A Holmgren	3	2
(Luxembourg) C Rodesch	6	6
Q	(Poland) M Kaśnikowski	2	6^{6}
7	(Austria) J Rodionov	6	7^{8}
3	(Lithuania) V Gaubas	6^{1}	7^{7}	6
(Spain) A Moro Cañas	7^{7}	6^{4}	1
NG	(Czech Republic) Petr Brunclík	6	6
Q	(Germany) H Squire	0	2
WC	(Portugal) G Elias	2	3
LL	(Kazakhstan) M Kukushkin	6	6
Q	(Estonia) M Lajal	6	6
6	(Spain) D Mérida	2	2

Second round
WC	(Portugal) T Torres	6	4	4
(Germany) M Rosenkranz	1	6	6
(Luxembourg) C Rodesch	6	6
7	(Austria) J Rodionov	4	3
3	(Lithuania) V Gaubas	6	1	6
NG	(Czech Republic) P Brunclík	1	6	3
LL	(Kazakhstan) M Kukushkin	6^{4}	6	7
Q	(Estonia) M Lajal	7^{7}	2	5

Quarterfinals
(Germany) M Rosenkranz	3	6^{3}
(Luxembourg) C Rodesch	6	7^{7}
3	(Lithuania) V Gaubas	6	6
LL	(Kazakhstan) M Kukushkin	4	3

Semifinals
(Luxembourg) C Rodesch	7^{7}	7^{9}
3	(Lithuania) V Gaubas	6^{5}	6^{7}

=== Bottom half ===
First round
8	(Colombia) N Mejía	2	6	7^{7}
(Czech Republic) Z Kolář	6	4	6^{4}
(Estonia) D Glinka	5	7^{8}	6
(Belgium) G Onclin	7	6^{6}	4
(Canada) A Galarneau	6^{2}	6	1
Q	(United States) S Kozlov	7^{7}	2	6
Q	(France) C Hemery	6^{6}	2
4	(Italy) F Passaro	7^{8}	6
5	(Portugal) H Rocha	4	2
(Switzerland) L Riedi	6	6
WC	(Portugal) T Pereira	4	4
LL	(Ecuador) A Andrade	6	6
(Switzerland) J Kym	4	7^{7}	2
Q	(Kazakhstan) D Yevseyev	6	6^{5}	6
(Hungary) Z Piros	7^{7}	6
LL	(United States) T Zink	6^{4}	3

Second round
8	(Colombia) N Mejía	3	3
(Estonia) D Glinka	6	6
Q	(United States) S Kozlov	3	6	1
4	(Italy) F Passaro	6	1	6
(Switzerland) L Riedi	6	7^{7}
LL	(Ecuador) A Andrade	4	6^{5}
Q	(Kazakhstan) D Yevseyev	1	2
(Hungary) Z Piros	6	6

Quarterfinals
(Estonia) D Glinka	7	6
4	(Italy) F Passaro	5	4
(Switzerland) L Riedi	3	1^{r}
(Hungary) Z Piros	6	3

Semifinals
(Estonia) D Glinka	5	6	1
(Hungary) Z Piros	7	4	6
