= 2025 Oeiras Indoors III – Doubles =

Doubles
- 2025 Oeiras Indoors III

Final
- Champions: (Canada) Liam Draxl (Canada) Cleeve Harper
- Runners-up: (Netherlands) Matwé Middelkoop (Ukraine) Denys Molchanov
- Score: 1–6, 7–5, [10–6]

Events
Singles	Doubles
← 2025 ·	Oeiras Indoors	· 2026 →

Mili Poljičak and Matej Sabanov were the defending champions but only Sabanov chose to defend his title, partnering Ivan Sabanov. They lost in the quarterfinals to Matwé Middelkoop and Denys Molchanov.

Liam Draxl and Cleeve Harper won the title after defeating Middelkoop and Molchanov 1–6, 7–5, [10–6] in the final.

== Seeds ==
1. (Netherlands) Matwé Middelkoop / (Ukraine) Denys Molchanov (final)
2. (Sweden) Filip Bergevi / (Finland) Patrik Niklas-Salminen (quarterfinals)
3. (United States) Vasil Kirkov / (Netherlands) Bart Stevens (quarterfinals)
4. (United States) Patrik Trhac / (Poland) Szymon Walków (first round)

== Draw ==
Key

- Q = Qualifier
- WC = Wild card
- LL = Lucky loser
- Alt = Alternate
- ITF = ITF entry
- PR = Protected ranking
- SR = Special ranking
- SE = Special exempt
- JE = Junior exempt
- JR = Junior Accelerator Programme entrant
- CO = College Accelerator Programme entrant
- NG = Next Gen Accelerator Program entrant
- w/o = Walkover
- r = Retired
- d = Defaulted

=== Draw ===
First round
1	(Netherlands) M Middelkoop (Ukraine) D Molchanov	6	6^{5}	[16]
WC	(Portugal) G Elias (Portugal) T Pereira	4	7^{7}	[14]
(Belgium) A Blockx (Belgium) R Collignon	0	4
(Serbia) I Sabanov (Serbia) M Sabanov	6	6
3	(United States) V Kirkov (Netherlands) B Stevens	6	6
(Moldova) R Albot (Kazakhstan) D Popko	4	3
(United States) G Goldhoff (United States) T Hilderbrand	6^{3}	4
I Liutarevich (Netherlands) M Veldheer	7^{7}	6
(Spain) Í Cervantes (Venezuela) LD Martínez	6	7^{12}
Alt	(Peru) A Merino (Germany) C Negritu	1	6^{10}
(Netherlands) J de Jong (Spain) A Moro Cañas	6	7^{7}
4	(United States) P Trhac (Poland) S Walków	4	6^{4}
(Canada) L Draxl (Canada) C Harper	6	7^{8}
WC	(Portugal) Pedro Araújo (Croatia) M Dodig	2	6^{6}
(France) C Chidekh (United Kingdom) J Paris	4	6	[7]
2	(Sweden) F Bergevi (Finland) P Niklas-Salminen	6	3	[10]

Quarterfinals
1	(Netherlands) M Middelkoop (Ukraine) D Molchanov	6	4	[10]
(Serbia) I Sabanov (Serbia) M Sabanov	2	6	[4]
3	(United States) V Kirkov (Netherlands) B Stevens	3	5
I Liutarevich (Netherlands) M Veldheer	6	7
(Spain) Í Cervantes (Venezuela) LD Martínez	6	6
(Netherlands) J de Jong (Spain) A Moro Cañas	3	4
(Canada) L Draxl (Canada) C Harper	2	6	[10]
2	(Sweden) F Bergevi (Finland) P Niklas-Salminen	6	3	[4]

Semifinals
1	(Netherlands) M Middelkoop (Ukraine) D Molchanov	6	6
I Liutarevich (Netherlands) M Veldheer	4	4
(Spain) Í Cervantes (Venezuela) LD Martínez	4	4
(Canada) L Draxl (Canada) C Harper	6	6

Final
1	(Netherlands) M Middelkoop (Ukraine) D Molchanov	6	5	[6]
(Canada) L Draxl (Canada) C Harper	1	7	[10]
