= 2025 Oeiras Indoors – Doubles =

Doubles
- 2025 Oeiras Indoors

Final
- Champions: (United States) George Goldhoff (United States) Trey Hilderbrand
- Runners-up: (Japan) Kaichi Uchida (Kazakhstan) Denis Yevseyev
- Score: 7–5, 2–6, [10–5]

Events
Singles	Doubles
- Oeiras Indoors

Karol Drzewiecki and Piotr Matuszewski were the defending champions but chose not to defend their title.

George Goldhoff and Trey Hilderbrand won the title after defeating Kaichi Uchida and Denis Yevseyev 7–5, 2–6, [10–5] in the final.

== Seeds ==
1. (Venezuela) Luis David Martínez / (Chile) Matías Soto (first round)
2. (Sweden) Filip Bergevi / (Denmark) Johannes Ingildsen (first round)
3. (Canada) Cleeve Harper / (United Kingdom) David Stevenson (quarterfinals)
4. (United States) Robert Cash / (United States) JJ Tracy (semifinals)

== Draw ==
Key

- Q = Qualifier
- WC = Wild card
- LL = Lucky loser
- Alt = Alternate
- ITF = ITF entry
- PR = Protected ranking
- SR = Special ranking
- SE = Special exempt
- JE = Junior exempt
- JR = Junior Accelerator Programme entrant
- CO = College Accelerator Programme entrant
- NG = Next Gen Accelerator Program entrant
- w/o = Walkover
- r = Retired
- d = Defaulted

=== Draw ===
First round
1	(Venezuela) LD Martínez (Chile) M Soto	1	4
I Liutarevich (France) L Sanchez	6	6
(United States) G Goldhoff (United States) T Hilderbrand	6	6
(Peru) A Merino (Germany) C Negritu	1	3
4	(United States) R Cash (United States) JJ Tracy	6	6
Alt	(Turkey) E Kırkın (Kazakhstan) B Zhukayev	4	4
(Canada) L Draxl (Canada) B Sigouin	2	1
WC	(Portugal) Pedro Araújo (Portugal) T Pereira	6	6
(Spain) Í Cervantes (Spain) D Rincón	7^{7}	6
(Romania) A Jecan (Italy) G Ricca	6^{1}	4
WC	(Portugal) G Elias (Portugal) D Vale	3	5
3	(Canada) C Harper (United Kingdom) D Stevenson	6	7
Alt	(Spain) P Martín Tiffon (Italy) Samuel Vincent Ruggeri	2	5
(Serbia) I Sabanov (Serbia) M Sabanov	6	7
(Japan) K Uchida (Kazakhstan) D Yevseyev	2	6	[11]
2	(Sweden) F Bergevi (Denmark) J Ingildsen	6	3	[9]

Quarterfinals
I Liutarevich (France) L Sanchez	6^{3}	4
(United States) G Goldhoff (United States) T Hilderbrand	7^{7}	6
4	(United States) R Cash (United States) JJ Tracy	6	3	[10]
WC	(Portugal) P Araújo (Portugal) T Pereira	4	6	[5]
(Spain) Í Cervantes (Spain) D Rincón	3	7^{7}	[11]
3	(Canada) C Harper (United Kingdom) D Stevenson	6	6^{5}	[9]
(Serbia) I Sabanov (Serbia) M Sabanov	2	6	[5]
(Japan) K Uchida (Kazakhstan) D Yevseyev	6	3	[10]

Semifinals
(United States) G Goldhoff (United States) T Hilderbrand	6	6
4	(United States) R Cash (United States) JJ Tracy	3	4
(Spain) Í Cervantes (Spain) D Rincón	3	6^{5}
(Japan) K Uchida (Kazakhstan) D Yevseyev	6	7^{7}

Final
(United States) G Goldhoff (United States) T Hilderbrand	7	2	[10]
(Japan) K Uchida (Kazakhstan) D Yevseyev	5	6	[5]
