= 2026 Oeiras Indoors II – Singles =

Singles
- 2026 Oeiras Indoors II

Final
- Champion: (Luxembourg) Chris Rodesch
- Runner-up: (Estonia) Daniil Glinka
- Score: 6–3, 7–5

Events
Singles	Doubles
- Oeiras Indoors

Chris Rodesch was the defending champion and successfully defended his title after defeating Daniil Glinka 6–3, 7–5 in the final.

== Seeds ==
1. (Denmark) Elmer Møller (first round, retired)
2. (Lithuania) Vilius Gaubas (second round)
3. (Spain) Martín Landaluce (first round)
4. (Portugal) Jaime Faria (quarterfinals)
5. (Portugal) Henrique Rocha (first round)
6. (Austria) Jurij Rodionov (first round)
7. (Hungary) Zsombor Piros (withdrew)
8. (Czech Republic) Zdeněk Kolář (first round)

== Draw ==
Key

- Q = Qualifier
- WC = Wild card
- LL = Lucky loser
- Alt = Alternate
- ITF = ITF entry
- PR = Protected ranking
- SR = Special ranking
- SE = Special exempt
- JE = Junior exempt
- JR = Junior Accelerator Programme entrant
- CO = College Accelerator Programme entrant
- NG = Next Gen Accelerator Program entrant
- w/o = Walkover
- r = Retired
- d = Defaulted

=== Finals ===
Semifinals
(Luxembourg) Chris Rodesch	6	6
(Canada) Alexis Galarneau	4	4
(Estonia) Daniil Glinka	4	7	6
(Portugal) Frederico Ferreira Silva	6	5	4

Final
(Luxembourg) Chris Rodesch	6	7
(Estonia) Daniil Glinka	3	5

=== Top half ===
First round
1	(Denmark) E Møller	3	0^{r}
(Luxembourg) C Rodesch	6	0
WC	(Portugal) T Torres	7	0	7^{7}
NG	(Czech Republic) Petr Brunclík	5	6	6^{1}
Q	(France) Mathys Erhard	7^{7}	6
(Japan) K Uchida	6^{4}	2
Q	(Spain) I Montes de la Torre	7^{7}	7^{7}
8	(Czech Republic) Z Kolář	6^{4}	6^{4}
4	(Portugal) J Faria	4	6	6
Alt	(Portugal) T Pereira	6	3	4
Q	(Germany) D Dedura	6	2	6
(France) C Hemery	4	6	3
(Canada) A Galarneau	6	6
(Switzerland) J Kym	2	2
(Denmark) A Holmgren	7^{7}	6
LL	(Colombia) A Soriano Barrera	6^{4}	1

Second round
(Luxembourg) C Rodesch	w/o
WC	(Portugal) T Torres
Q	(France) M Erhard	3	3
Q	(Spain) I Montes de la Torre	6	6
4	(Portugal) J Faria	6	7
Q	(Germany) D Dedura	3	5
(Canada) A Galarneau	6	4	7
(Denmark) A Holmgren	4	6	5

Quarterfinals
(Luxembourg) C Rodesch	6	6
Q	(Spain) I Montes de la Torre	4	4
4	(Portugal) J Faria	5	6^{4}
(Canada) A Galarneau	7	7^{7}

Semifinals
(Luxembourg) C Rodesch	6	6
(Canada) A Galarneau	4	4

=== Bottom half ===
First round
5	(Portugal) H Rocha	6	4	4
(Spain) A Moro Cañas	3	6	6
Alt	(Germany) P Zahraj	3	2
(Spain) P Llamas Ruiz	6	6
WC	(Portugal) G Elias	2	4
(Estonia) D Glinka	6	6
Q	(Kazakhstan) M Kukushkin	6	6
3/WC	(Spain) M Landaluce	2	1
6	(Austria) J Rodionov	5	3
I Gakhov	7	6
Q	(Ecuador) A Andrade	1	2
Q	(Germany) M Rosenkranz	6	6
(Bolivia) JC Prado Ángelo	2	3
(Portugal) F Ferreira Silva	6	6
(United States) M Damm	7^{7}	3	6^{3}
2	(Lithuania) V Gaubas	6^{4}	6	7^{7}

Second round
(Spain) A Moro Cañas	5	1
(Spain) P Llamas Ruiz	7	6
(Estonia) D Glinka	6	6
Q	(Kazakhstan) M Kukushkin	3	4
I Gakhov	6	7^{7}
Q	(Germany) M Rosenkranz	4	6^{2}
(Portugal) F Ferreira Silva	5	7^{7}	7
2	(Lithuania) V Gaubas	7	6^{4}	5

Quarterfinals
(Spain) P Llamas Ruiz	2	6	6^{5}
(Estonia) D Glinka	6	3	7^{7}
I Gakhov	3	4
(Portugal) F Ferreira Silva	6	6

Semifinals
(Estonia) D Glinka	4	7	6
(Portugal) F Ferreira Silva	6	5	4
