= 2024 Oeiras Indoors – Singles =

Singles
- 2024 Oeiras Indoors

Final
- Champion: (Poland) Maks Kaśnikowski
- Runner-up: (Portugal) Gastão Elias
- Score: 7–6^{(7–1)}, 4–6, 6–3

Events
Singles	Doubles
← 2023 ·	Oeiras Indoors	· 2024 →

Arthur Fils was the defending champion but chose not to defend his title.

Maks Kaśnikowski won the title after defeating Gastão Elias 7–6^{(7–1)}, 4–6, 6–3 in the final.

== Seeds ==
1. (Portugal) Henrique Rocha (first round)
2. (Portugal) João Sousa (quarterfinals)
3. (Turkey) Cem İlkel (second round)
4. (France) Maxime Janvier (first round, retired)
5. (Bulgaria) Adrian Andreev (first round)
6. (France) Valentin Royer (semifinals)
7. (France) Mathias Bourgue (second round)
8. (Belgium) Michael Geerts (first round)

== Draw ==
Key

- Q = Qualifier
- WC = Wild card
- LL = Lucky loser
- Alt = Alternate
- ITF = ITF entry
- PR = Protected ranking
- SR = Special ranking
- SE = Special exempt
- JE = Junior exempt
- JR = Junior Accelerator Programme entrant
- CO = College Accelerator Programme entrant
- NG = Next Gen Accelerator Program entrant
- w/o = Walkover
- r = Retired
- d = Defaulted

=== Finals ===
Semifinals
Q	Egor Gerasimov	4	6	3
(Portugal) Gastão Elias	6	3	6
6	(France) Valentin Royer	4	4
(Poland) Maks Kaśnikowski	6	6

Final
(Portugal) Gastão Elias	6^{1}	6	3
(Poland) Maks Kaśnikowski	7^{7}	4	6

=== Top half ===
First round
1	(Portugal) H Rocha	4	4
(United States) T-S Kwiatkowski	6	6
(Italy) L Giustino	7	4	6
(Czech Republic) M Vrbenský	5	6	4
WC	(Portugal) T Pereira	6^{5}	1
Q	E Gerasimov	7^{7}	6
(United States) T Kodat	3	1
7	(France) M Bourgue	6	6
3	(Turkey) C İlkel	6	3	7
(Germany) S Fanselow	3	6	5
Q	(France) K de Schepper	4	4
(Portugal) G Elias	6	6
LL	(Ukraine) Vadym Ursu	6	7
(United States) E Quinn	4	5
WC	(Portugal) J Faria	7^{8}	6
8	(Belgium) M Geerts	6^{6}	2

Second round
(United States) T-S Kwiatkowski	6	6
(Italy) L Giustino	4	4
Q	E Gerasimov	6	2	6
7	(France) M Bourgue	4	6	4
3	(Turkey) C İlkel	4	2
(Portugal) G Elias	6	6
LL	(Ukraine) V Ursu	3	4
WC	(Portugal) J Faria	6	6

Quarterfinals
(United States) T-S Kwiatkowski	7^{7}	3	4
Q	E Gerasimov	6^{2}	6	6
(Portugal) G Elias	6	3	6
WC	(Portugal) J Faria	2	6	4

Semifinals
Q	E Gerasimov	4	6	3
(Portugal) G Elias	6	3	6

=== Bottom half ===
First round
6	(France) V Royer	6	6^{1}	6
(United Kingdom) C Broom	3	7^{7}	3
(France) G Debru	4	1
Q	(United Kingdom) A Gray	6	6
Q	(United Kingdom) J Clarke	6	7^{7}
(United States) A Mayo	3	6^{2}
(France) T Lamasine	7^{7}	0
4	(France) M Janvier	6^{3}	0^{r}
5	(Bulgaria) A Andreev	6	6^{10}	3
(Poland) M Kaśnikowski	3	7^{12}	6
Q	(United States) N Rubin	4	6	5
WC	(Portugal) J Domingues	6	1	7
PR	(Spain) N Álvarez Varona	5	2
PR	(United Kingdom) P Jubb	7	6
Q	(Italy) Samuel Vincent Ruggeri	4	2
2	(Portugal) J Sousa	6	6

Second round
6	(France) V Royer	6^{1}	6	6
Q	(United Kingdom) A Gray	7^{7}	1	3
Q	(United Kingdom) J Clarke	6	4	4
(France) T Lamasine	1	6	6
(Poland) M Kaśnikowski	7	6
WC	(Portugal) J Domingues	5	4
PR	(United Kingdom) P Jubb	6^{6}	4
2	(Portugal) J Sousa	7^{8}	6

Quarterfinals
6	(France) V Royer	6	6
(France) T Lamasine	4	3
(Poland) M Kaśnikowski	7^{7}	6
2	(Portugal) J Sousa	6^{1}	4

Semifinals
6	(France) V Royer	4	4
(Poland) M Kaśnikowski	6	6
