= 2024 Oeiras Indoors II =

- Date: 8 – 13 January
- Edition: 4th
- Surface: Hard (indoor)
- Location: Oeiras, Portugal

Champions

Singles
- (Switzerland) Leandro Riedi

Doubles
- (Poland) Karol Drzewiecki / (Poland) Piotr Matuszewski
← 2024 ·	Oeiras Indoors	· 2025 →

The 2024 Oeiras Indoors II was a professional tennis tournament played on hard courts. It was the 4th edition of the tournament which was part of the 2024 ATP Challenger Tour. It took place in Oeiras, Portugal from 8 to 13 January 2024.

== Singles main-draw entrants ==
=== Seeds ===
Country	Player	Rank^{1}	Seed
ESP	Alejandro Moro Cañas	243	1
POR	Henrique Rocha	246	2
POR	João Sousa	249	3
~~GER~~	~~Oscar Otte~~	~~252~~	~~4~~
TUR	Cem İlkel	255	5
USA	Martin Damm	257	6
FRA	Maxime Janvier	258	7
SUI	Leandro Riedi	261	8

- ^{1} Rankings are as of 1 January 2024.

=== Other entrants ===
The following players received wildcards into the singles main draw:

- (Portugal) João Domingues
- (Portugal) Jaime Faria
- (Portugal) Tiago Pereira

The following players received entry into the singles main draw using protected rankings:

- (Spain) Nicolás Álvarez Varona
- (United Kingdom) Paul Jubb

The following players received entry into the singles main draw as special exempts:

- (Portugal) Gastão Elias
- (Poland) Maks Kaśnikowski

The following players received entry from the qualifying draw:

- (Romania) Marius Copil
- (Germany) Sebastian Fanselow
- (United Kingdom) Aidan McHugh
- (Denmark) Elmer Møller
- (Italy) Samuel Vincent Ruggeri
- (Czech Republic) Michael Vrbenský

The following player received entry as a lucky loser:

- (France) Dan Added

== Champions ==
=== Singles ===
- (Switzerland) Leandro Riedi def. (United States) Martin Damm 7–6^{(8–6)}, 6–2.

=== Doubles ===
- (Poland) Karol Drzewiecki / (Poland) Piotr Matuszewski def. (India) Arjun Kadhe / (United Kingdom) Marcus Willis 6–3, 6–4.
