= 2024 Oeiras Indoors II – Singles =

Singles
- 2024 Oeiras Indoors II

Final
- Champion: (Switzerland) Leandro Riedi
- Runner-up: (United States) Martin Damm
- Score: 7–6^{(8–6)}, 6–2

Events
Singles	Doubles
← 2024 ·	Oeiras Indoors	· 2025 →

Maks Kaśnikowski was the defending champion but lost in the second round to Valentin Royer.

Leandro Riedi won the title after defeating Martin Damm 7–6^{(8–6)}, 6–2 in the final.

== Seeds ==
1. (Spain) Alejandro Moro Cañas (quarterfinals)
2. (Portugal) Henrique Rocha (first round)
3. (Portugal) João Sousa (quarterfinals)
4. (Germany) Oscar Otte (withdrew)
5. (Turkey) Cem İlkel (first round)
6. (United States) Martin Damm (final)
7. (France) Maxime Janvier (first round)
8. (Switzerland) Leandro Riedi (champion)

== Draw ==
Key

- Q = Qualifier
- WC = Wild card
- LL = Lucky loser
- Alt = Alternate
- ITF = ITF entry
- PR = Protected ranking
- SR = Special ranking
- SE = Special exempt
- JE = Junior exempt
- JR = Junior Accelerator Programme entrant
- CO = College Accelerator Programme entrant
- NG = Next Gen Accelerator Program entrant
- w/o = Walkover
- r = Retired
- d = Defaulted

=== Finals ===
Semifinals
Q	(Romania) Marius Copil	3	7^{7}	5
6	(United States) Martin Damm	6	6^{5}	7
8	(Switzerland) Leandro Riedi	6	6
SE	(Portugal) Gastão Elias	3	3

Final
6	(United States) Martin Damm	6^{6}	2
8	(Switzerland) Leandro Riedi	7^{8}	6

=== Top half ===
First round
1	(Spain) A Moro Cañas	2	7^{7}	6
(United States) A Mayo	6	6^{2}	4
(Denmark) A Holmgren	6	0
(Austria) M Neuchrist	2	0^{r}
Q	(Romania) M Copil	6	6^{5}	7^{8}
(Bulgaria) A Andreev	2	7^{7}	6^{6}
(France) M Martineau	6	4	6
7	(France) M Janvier	4	6	2
3	(Portugal) J Sousa	7^{7}	3	7^{7}
Q	(Italy) Samuel Vincent Ruggeri	6^{5}	6	6^{5}
(Italy) L Giustino	6	2	7
Q	(Czech Republic) M Vrbenský	4	6	5
WC	(Portugal) T Pereira	4	1
PR	(United Kingdom) P Jubb	6	6
(Belgium) M Geerts	6^{1}	4
6	(United States) M Damm	7^{7}	6

Second round
1	(Spain) A Moro Cañas	6	7
(Denmark) A Holmgren	3	5
Q	(Romania) M Copil	7^{7}	3	6
(France) M Martineau	6^{5}	6	1
3	(Portugal) J Sousa	6	6
(Italy) L Giustino	3	1
PR	(United Kingdom) P Jubb	2	6	5
6	(United States) M Damm	6	3	7

Quarterfinals
1	(Spain) A Moro Cañas	4	7^{8}	6^{7}
Q	(Romania) M Copil	6	6^{6}	7^{9}
3	(Portugal) J Sousa	2	5
6	(United States) M Damm	6	7

Semifinals
Q	(Romania) M Copil	3	7^{7}	5
6	(United States) M Damm	6	6^{5}	7

=== Bottom half ===
First round
8	(Switzerland) L Riedi	6	6
Q	(United Kingdom) A McHugh	2	3
Q	(Germany) S Fanselow	6	0
WC	(Portugal) J Faria	2	0^{r}
(Italy) E Dalla Valle	4	6	7^{7}
LL	(France) D Added	6	3	6^{5}
PR	(Spain) N Álvarez Varona	5	0^{r}
Q	(Denmark) E Møller	7	1
5	(Turkey) C İlkel	2	3
SE	(Portugal) G Elias	6	6
(United States) E Quinn	7	6
WC	(Portugal) J Domingues	5	3
(France) M Bourgue	1	6	3
SE	(Poland) M Kaśnikowski	6	1	6
(France) V Royer	6	6
2	(Portugal) H Rocha	3	0

Second round
8	(Switzerland) L Riedi	6	6
Q	(Germany) S Fanselow	3	0
(Italy) E Dalla Valle	2	1
Q	(Denmark) E Møller	6	6
SE	(Portugal) G Elias	3	7	6
(United States) E Quinn	6	5	4
SE	(Poland) M Kaśnikowski	3	2
(France) V Royer	6	6

Quarterfinals
8	(Switzerland) L Riedi	6	6
Q	(Denmark) E Møller	3	2
SE	(Portugal) G Elias	6	6
(France) V Royer	4	4

Semifinals
8	(Switzerland) L Riedi	6	6
SE	(Portugal) G Elias	3	3
