= 2024 Oeiras Indoors II – Doubles =

Doubles
- 2024 Oeiras Indoors II

Final
- Champions: (Poland) Karol Drzewiecki (Poland) Piotr Matuszewski
- Runners-up: (India) Arjun Kadhe (United Kingdom) Marcus Willis
- Score: 6–3, 6–4

Events
| Singles | Doubles |
| ← 2024 · | Oeiras Indoors | · 2025 → |

Jay Clarke and Marcus Willis were the defending champions but only Willis chose to defend his title, partnering Arjun Kadhe. Willis lost in the final to Karol Drzewiecki and Piotr Matuszewski.

Drzewiecki and Matuszewski won the title after defeating Kadhe and Willis 6–3, 6–4 in the final.

== Seeds ==
1. (France) Jonathan Eysseric / (Venezuela) Luis David Martínez (quarterfinals)
2. (Czech Republic) Roman Jebavý / (Austria) Philipp Oswald (quarterfinals)
3. (Netherlands) Sander Arends / (Netherlands) Sem Verbeek (quarterfinals)
4. (India) Arjun Kadhe / (United Kingdom) Marcus Willis (final)

== Draw ==
Key

- Q = Qualifier
- WC = Wild card
- LL = Lucky loser
- Alt = Alternate
- ITF = ITF entry
- PR = Protected ranking
- SR = Special ranking
- SE = Special exempt
- JE = Junior exempt
- JR = Junior Accelerator Programme entrant
- CO = College Accelerator Programme entrant
- NG = Next Gen Accelerator Program entrant
- w/o = Walkover
- r = Retired
- d = Defaulted

First round
1 | (France) J Eysseric (Venezuela) LD Martínez | 7^{10} | 6
(Romania) M Copil (Romania) A Jecan | 6^{8} | 2
(Latvia) M Lībietis (Finland) P Niklas-Salminen | 7 | 6
(France) T Arribagé (Belgium) M Geerts | 5 | 3
3 | (Netherlands) S Arends (Netherlands) S Verbeek | 6 | 6
(Ukraine) V Uzhylovskyi (Italy) Samuel Vincent Ruggeri | 2 | 2
(France) D Added (United States) M Damm | 3 | 6^{1}
(Poland) K Drzewiecki (Poland) P Matuszewski | 6 | 7^{7}
(United States) A Lawson (Spain) S Martos Gornés | 5 | 4
Alt | (Portugal) Gonçalo Falcão (Brazil) F Romboli | 7 | 6
WC | (Portugal) T Pereira (Portugal) Francisco Rocha | 1 | 4
4 | (India) A Kadhe (United Kingdom) M Willis | 6 | 6
Alt | (Bulgaria) A Andreev (United Kingdom) A McHugh | 3 | 4
(Sweden) F Bergevi (Netherlands) M Veldheer | 6 | 6
(Portugal) J Faria (Portugal) H Rocha | 6 | 1 | [8]
2 | (Czech Republic) R Jebavý (Austria) P Oswald | 4 | 6 | [10]

Quarterfinals
1 | (France) J Eysseric (Venezuela) LD Martínez | 6^{4} | 7^{7} | [5]
(Latvia) M Lībietis (Finland) P Niklas-Salminen | 7^{7} | 6^{3} | [10]
3 | (Netherlands) S Arends (Netherlands) S Verbeek | 2 | 6 | [8]
(Poland) K Drzewiecki (Poland) P Matuszewski | 6 | 3 | [10]
Alt | (Portugal) G Falcão (Brazil) F Romboli
4 | (India) A Kadhe (United Kingdom) M Willis | w/o
(Sweden) F Bergevi (Netherlands) M Veldheer | 6 | 7
2 | (Czech Republic) R Jebavý (Austria) P Oswald | 3 | 5

Semifinals
(Latvia) M Lībietis (Finland) P Niklas-Salminen | 5 | 5
(Poland) K Drzewiecki (Poland) P Matuszewski | 7 | 7
4 | (India) A Kadhe (United Kingdom) M Willis | 6 | 3 | [13]
(Sweden) F Bergevi (Netherlands) M Veldheer | 2 | 6 | [11]

Final
(Poland) K Drzewiecki (Poland) P Matuszewski | 6 | 6
4 | (India) A Kadhe (United Kingdom) M Willis | 3 | 4
