= 2025 Oeiras Indoors II – Doubles =

Doubles
- 2025 Oeiras Indoors II

Final
- Champions: (Croatia) Mili Poljičak (Serbia) Matej Sabanov
- Runners-up: (Spain) Íñigo Cervantes (Netherlands) Mick Veldheer
- Score: 6–0, 6–1

Events
Singles	Doubles
- Oeiras Indoors

George Goldhoff and Trey Hilderbrand were the defending champions but lost in the quarterfinals to Cleeve Harper and David Stevenson.

Mili Poljičak and Matej Sabanov won the title after defeating Íñigo Cervantes and Mick Veldheer 6–0, 6–1 in the final.

== Seeds ==
1. (Netherlands) Matwé Middelkoop / (Ukraine) Denys Molchanov (quarterfinals)
2. (Venezuela) Luis David Martínez / (Chile) Matías Soto (first round)
3. (United States) Vasil Kirkov / (Netherlands) Bart Stevens (quarterfinals)
4. (United States) Patrik Trhac / (Poland) Szymon Walków (first round)

== Draw ==
Key

- Q = Qualifier
- WC = Wild card
- LL = Lucky loser
- Alt = Alternate
- ITF = ITF entry
- PR = Protected ranking
- SR = Special ranking
- SE = Special exempt
- JE = Junior exempt
- JR = Junior Accelerator Programme entrant
- CO = College Accelerator Programme entrant
- NG = Next Gen Accelerator Program entrant
- w/o = Walkover
- r = Retired
- d = Defaulted

=== Draw ===
First round
1	(Netherlands) M Middelkoop (Ukraine) D Molchanov	6	7^{7}
Alt	(Kazakhstan) D Yevseyev (Kazakhstan) B Zhukayev	0	6^{3}
(Sweden) F Bergevi (Denmark) J Ingildsen	4	1
Alt	(Croatia) M Poljičak (Serbia) M Sabanov	6	6
4	(United States) P Trhac (Poland) S Walków	4	4
(Canada) L Draxl (Canada) B Sigouin	6	6
Alt	(United States) M Kiger (New Zealand) F Reynolds	2	7^{7}	[13]
(Peru) A Merino (Germany) C Negritu	6	6^{4}	[11]
(Romania) A Jecan (Italy) G Ricca	0	3
(Spain) Í Cervantes (Netherlands) M Veldheer	6	6
WC	(Portugal) G Elias (Portugal) T Pereira	2	3
3	(United States) V Kirkov (Netherlands) B Stevens	6	6
(United States) R Cash (United States) JJ Tracy	6^{4}	7^{7}	[4]
(United States) G Goldhoff (United States) T Hilderbrand	7^{7}	6^{5}	[10]
(Canada) C Harper (United Kingdom) D Stevenson	4	6	[10]
2	(Venezuela) LD Martínez (Chile) M Soto	6	4	[6]

Quarterfinals
1	(Netherlands) M Middelkoop (Ukraine) D Molchanov	5	6	[5]
Alt	(Croatia) M Poljičak (Serbia) M Sabanov	7	4	[10]
(Canada) L Draxl (Canada) B Sigouin	2	6^{3}
Alt	(United States) M Kiger (New Zealand) F Reynolds	6	7^{7}
(Spain) Í Cervantes (Netherlands) M Veldheer	7^{7}	6
3	(United States) V Kirkov (Netherlands) B Stevens	6^{1}	3
(United States) G Goldhoff (United States) T Hilderbrand	2	7^{7}	[5]
(Canada) C Harper (United Kingdom) D Stevenson	6	6^{3}	[10]

Semifinals
Alt	(Croatia) M Poljičak (Serbia) M Sabanov	6	7^{11}
Alt	(United States) M Kiger (New Zealand) F Reynolds	3	6^{9}
(Spain) Í Cervantes (Netherlands) M Veldheer	3	6	[11]
(Canada) C Harper (United Kingdom) D Stevenson	6	3	[9]

Final
Alt	(Croatia) M Poljičak (Serbia) M Sabanov	6	6
(Spain) Í Cervantes (Netherlands) M Veldheer	0	1
