= 2025 Oeiras Indoors III =

- Date: 21 – 26 January
- Edition: 7th
- Surface: Hard (indoor)
- Location: Oeiras, Portugal

Champions

Singles
- (Belgium) Alexander Blockx

Doubles
- (Canada) Liam Draxl / (Canada) Cleeve Harper
← 2025 ·	Oeiras Indoors	· 2026 →

The 2025 Oeiras Indoors III was a professional tennis tournament played on hard courts. It was the 7th edition of the tournament which was part of the 2025 ATP Challenger Tour. It took place in Oeiras, Portugal from 21 to 26 January 2025.

== Singles main-draw entrants ==
=== Seeds ===
Country	Player	Rank^{1}	Seed
HUN	Márton Fucsovics	99	1
USA	Christopher Eubanks	102	2
NED	Jesper de Jong	111	3
SUI	Alexander Ritschard	118	4
BEL	Raphaël Collignon	120	5
GER	Dominik Koepfer	124	6
POR	Jaime Faria	125	7
SVK	Lukáš Klein	144	8

- ^{1} Rankings are as of 13 January 2025.

=== Other entrants ===
The following players received wildcards into the singles main draw:

- (Portugal) Pedro Araújo
- (Portugal) Gastão Elias
- (Portugal) Frederico Ferreira Silva

The following players received entry into the singles main draw as alternates:

- (Bulgaria) Adrian Andreev
- (Georgia (country)) Nikoloz Basilashvili
- (Colombia) Nicolás Mejía

The following players received entry from the qualifying draw:

- (Peru) Ignacio Buse
- (Canada) Liam Draxl
- (Estonia) Mark Lajal
- (Spain) Daniel Rincón
- (Kazakhstan) Denis Yevseyev
- (Kazakhstan) Beibit Zhukayev

== Champions ==
=== Singles ===
- (Belgium) Alexander Blockx def. (Canada) Liam Draxl 7–5, 6–1.

=== Doubles ===
- (Canada) Liam Draxl / (Canada) Cleeve Harper def. (Netherlands) Matwé Middelkoop / (Ukraine) Denys Molchanov 1–6, 7–5, [10–6].
