= 2026 Oeiras Indoors =

- Date: 19 – 25 January
- Edition: 8th
- Surface: Hard (indoor)
- Location: Oeiras, Portugal

Champions

Singles
- (Luxembourg) Chris Rodesch

Doubles
- (Canada) Cleeve Harper / (United Kingdom) David Stevenson
- Oeiras Indoors

The 2026 Oeiras Indoors was a professional tennis tournament played on hard courts. It was the 8th edition of the tournament which was part of the 2026 ATP Challenger Tour. It took place in Oeiras, Portugal from 19 to 25 January 2026.

== Singles main-draw entrants ==
=== Seeds ===
Country	Player	Rank^{1}	Seed
GBR	Billy Harris	121	1
~~GBR~~	~~Jan Choinski~~	~~124~~	~~2~~
LTU	Vilius Gaubas	129	3
ITA	Francesco Passaro	140	4
POR	Henrique Rocha	158	5
ESP	Daniel Mérida	164	6
AUT	Jurij Rodionov	167	7
COL	Nicolás Mejía	169	8

- ^{1} Rankings are as of 12 January 2026.

=== Other entrants ===
The following players received wildcards into the singles main draw:

- (Portugal) Gastão Elias
- (Portugal) Tiago Pereira
- (Portugal) Tiago Torres

The following player received entry into the singles main draw through the Next Gen Accelerator programme:

- (Czech Republic) Petr Brunclík

The following players received entry from the qualifying draw:

- (France) Calvin Hemery
- (Poland) Maks Kaśnikowski
- (United States) Stefan Kozlov
- (Estonia) Mark Lajal
- (Germany) Henri Squire
- (Kazakhstan) Denis Yevseyev

The following players received entry as lucky losers:

- (Ecuador) Andrés Andrade
- (Kazakhstan) Mikhail Kukushkin
- (United States) Tyler Zink

== Champions ==
=== Singles ===
- (Luxembourg) Chris Rodesch def. (Hungary) Zsombor Piros 6–4, 4–6, 6–2.

=== Doubles ===
- (Canada) Cleeve Harper / (United Kingdom) David Stevenson def. (Portugal) Francisco Rocha / (Portugal) Tiago Torres 6–3, 3–6, [12–10].
