= 2025 Oeiras Indoors II – Singles =

Singles
- 2025 Oeiras Indoors II

Final
- Champion: (United States) Aleksandar Kovacevic
- Runner-up: (Hungary) Zsombor Piros
- Score: 6–4, 7–6^{(7–4)}

Events
Singles	Doubles
- Oeiras Indoors

Hamad Medjedovic was the defending champion but lost in the quarterfinals to Zsombor Piros.

Aleksandar Kovacevic won the title after defeating Piros 6–4, 7–6^{(7–4)} in the final.

== Seeds ==
1. (United States) Aleksandar Kovacevic (champion)
2. (Serbia) Hamad Medjedovic (quarterfinals)
3. (Switzerland) Alexander Ritschard (quarterfinals)
4. (United States) Mackenzie McDonald (semifinals)
5. (United Kingdom) Dan Evans (first round)
6. (Portugal) Henrique Rocha (second round)
7. (Germany) Maximilian Marterer (first round)
8. (France) Clément Chidekh (first round)

== Draw ==
Key

- Q = Qualifier
- WC = Wild card
- LL = Lucky loser
- Alt = Alternate
- ITF = ITF entry
- PR = Protected ranking
- SR = Special ranking
- SE = Special exempt
- JE = Junior exempt
- JR = Junior Accelerator Programme entrant
- CO = College Accelerator Programme entrant
- NG = Next Gen Accelerator Program entrant
- w/o = Walkover
- r = Retired
- d = Defaulted

=== Finals ===
Semifinals
1	(United States) Aleksandar Kovacevic	6	3	6
(Canada) Alexis Galarneau	3	6	2
4	(United States) Mackenzie McDonald	1	3
(Hungary) Zsombor Piros	6	6

Final
1	(United States) Aleksandar Kovacevic	6	7^{7}
(Hungary) Zsombor Piros	4	6^{4}

=== Top half ===
First round
1	(United States) A Kovacevic	6	6
(Canada) L Draxl	1	3
(Estonia) M Lajal	4
Q	(Ukraine) O Ovcharenko	0^{r}
(Kazakhstan) B Zhukayev	6	6
(Chile) M Soto	1	4
Q	(Lithuania) E Butvilas	6	5	6
7	(Germany) M Marterer	4	7	1
3	(Switzerland) A Ritschard	7^{7}	7
(United States) P Kypson	6^{5}	5
(Italy) G Mager	6	4	4
WC	(Portugal) Pedro Araújo	3	6	6
(Peru) I Buse	3	4
(Canada) A Galarneau	6	6
WC	(Portugal) G Elias	6	5	7
5	(United Kingdom) D Evans	4	7	5

Second round
1	(United States) A Kovacevic	6	6
(Estonia) M Lajal	3	3
(Kazakhstan) B Zhukayev	7	4	6
Q	(Lithuania) E Butvilas	5	6	1
3	(Switzerland) A Ritschard	6	7
WC	(Portugal) P Araújo	2	5
(Canada) A Galarneau	6	6
WC	(Portugal) G Elias	3	4

Quarterfinals
1	(United States) A Kovacevic	6	6
(Kazakhstan) B Zhukayev	4	3
3	(Switzerland) A Ritschard	6	5	6^{9}
(Canada) A Galarneau	2	7	7^{11}

Semifinals
1	(United States) A Kovacevic	6	3	6
(Canada) A Galarneau	3	6	2

=== Bottom half ===
First round
6	(Portugal) H Rocha	1	6	6
Q	(France) R Bertrand	6	2	2
WC	(Portugal) F Ferreira Silva	6	2	6
(Kazakhstan) D Yevseyev	4	6	1
(Colombia) N Mejía	3	1
Q	(United States) JJ Wolf	6	6
(Croatia) D Prižmić	4	5
4	(United States) M McDonald	6	7
8	(France) C Chidekh	2	3
(Hungary) Z Piros	6	6
(Spain) P Martín Tiffon	7^{8}	6
(Spain) J Barranco Cosano	6^{6}	2
Q	(Portugal) T Pereira	6^{1}	3
Q	(Turkey) E Kırkın	7^{7}	6
(Jordan) A Shelbayh	2	3
2	(Serbia) H Medjedovic	6	6

Second round
6	(Portugal) H Rocha	7^{7}	6^{3}	6^{5}
WC	(Portugal) F Ferreira Silva	6^{3}	7^{7}	7^{7}
Q	(United States) JJ Wolf	6^{5}	6	2
4	(United States) M McDonald	7^{7}	4	6
(Hungary) Z Piros	5
(Spain) P Martín Tiffon	2^{r}
Q	(Turkey) E Kırkın	2	2
2	(Serbia) H Medjedovic	6	6

Quarterfinals
WC	(Portugal) F Ferreira Silva	5	4
4	(United States) M McDonald	7	6
(Hungary) Z Piros	6	7^{7}
2	(Serbia) H Medjedovic	4	6^{2}

Semifinals
4	(United States) M McDonald	1	3
(Hungary) Z Piros	6	6
