= 2023 Oeiras Indoors – Singles =

Singles
- 2023 Oeiras Indoors

Final
- Champion: (Belgium) Joris De Loore
- Runner-up: (Romania) Filip Cristian Jianu
- Score: 6–3, 6–2

Events
| Singles | Doubles |
- Oeiras Indoors

This was the first edition of the tournament.

Joris De Loore won the title after defeating Filip Cristian Jianu 6–3, 6–2 in the final.

== Seeds ==
1. (Lithuania) Ričardas Berankis (second round)
2. (United Kingdom) Jay Clarke (second round)
3. (Italy) Matteo Gigante (second round)
4. (Serbia) Hamad Međedović (second round)
5. (Tunisia) Aziz Dougaz (first round)
6. (Austria) Maximilian Neuchrist (quarterfinals)
7. (Hungary) Máté Valkusz (first round)
8. (Belgium) Raphaël Collignon (semifinals)

== Draw ==
Key

- Q = Qualifier
- WC = Wild card
- LL = Lucky loser
- Alt = Alternate
- ITF = ITF entry
- PR = Protected ranking
- SR = Special ranking
- SE = Special exempt
- JE = Junior exempt
- JR = Junior Accelerator Programme entrant
- CO = College Accelerator Programme entrant
- NG = Next Gen Accelerator Program entrant
- w/o = Walkover
- r = Retired
- d = Defaulted

=== Finals ===
Semifinals
Q | (Turkey) Cem İlkel | 4 | 6 | 6^{7}
Q | (Belgium) Joris De Loore | 6 | 3 | 7^{9}
(Romania) Filip Cristian Jianu | 6 | 6
8 | (Belgium) Raphaël Collignon | 3 | 2

Final
Q | (Belgium) Joris De Loore | 6 | 6
(Romania) Filip Cristian Jianu | 3 | 2

=== Top half ===
First round
1 | (Lithuania) R Berankis | 2 | 6 | 7
(Italy) GM Moroni | 6 | 1 | 5
Q | (France) K de Schepper | 6 | 2 | 4
Q | (Turkey) C İlkel | 4 | 6 | 6
(Germany) Elmar Ejupovic | 6 | 7
WC | (Portugal) P Sousa | 3 | 5
(France) G Debru | 2 | 6 | 7
7 | (Hungary) M Valkusz | 6 | 1 | 5
3 | (Italy) M Gigante | 6 | 7
(France) C Tabur | 3 | 5
Q | (Croatia) D Prižmić | 7 | 6
(France) P-H Herbert | 5 | 1
WC | (Portugal) G Oliveira | 6 | 7^{9}
(Germany) L Wessels | 3 | 6^{7}
Q | (Belgium) J De Loore | 6 | 7^{10}
5 | (Tunisia) A Dougaz | 2 | 6^{8}

Second round
1 | (Lithuania) R Berankis | 2 | 7 | 6^{3}
Q | (Turkey) C İlkel | 6 | 5 | 7^{7}
(Germany) E Ejupovic | 3 | 6 | 5
(France) G Debru | 6 | 4 | 7
3 | (Italy) M Gigante | 6 | 1 | 3
Q | (Croatia) D Prižmić | 2 | 6 | 6
WC | (Portugal) G Oliveira | 4 | 4
Q | (Belgium) J De Loore | 6 | 6

Quarterfinals
Q | (Turkey) C İlkel | 6 | 6
(France) G Debru | 1 | 2
Q | (Croatia) D Prižmić | 4 | 3
Q | (Belgium) J De Loore | 6 | 6

Semifinals
Q | (Turkey) C İlkel | 4 | 6 | 6^{7}
Q | (Belgium) J De Loore | 6 | 3 | 7^{9}

=== Bottom half ===
First round
6 | (Austria) M Neuchrist | 7 | 7^{7}
(Austria) L Neumayer | 5 | 6^{3}
(Monaco) V Vacherot | 6 | 4 | 1
(Portugal) J Domingues | 1 | 6 | 6
(Romania) FC Jianu | 3 | 6 | 7^{7}
Q | (Estonia) M Lajal | 6 | 3 | 6^{5}
(Germany) Lucas Gerch | 4 | 3
4 | (Serbia) H Međedović | 6 | 6
8 | (Belgium) R Collignon | 6 | 6
WC | (Portugal) J Faria | 1 | 1
(Italy) L Giustino | 6 | 3 | 6
(Spain) P Martín Tiffon | 1 | 6 | 3
LL | (Israel) E Leshem | 6 | 6
Q | A Kachmazov | 4 | 4
(Brazil) G Décamps | 6^{4} | 1
2 | (United Kingdom) J Clarke | 7^{7} | 6

Second round
6 | (Austria) M Neuchrist | 6 | 7^{9}
(Portugal) J Domingues | 3 | 6^{7}
(Romania) FC Jianu | 6 | 6
4 | (Serbia) H Međedović | 2 | 3
8 | (Belgium) R Collignon | 6 | 7^{7}
(Italy) L Giustino | 2 | 6^{5}
LL | (Israel) E Leshem | 3 | 6 | 6
2 | (United Kingdom) J Clarke | 6 | 3 | 2

Quarterfinals
6 | (Austria) M Neuchrist | 3 | 6^{4}
(Romania) FC Jianu | 6 | 7^{7}
8 | (Belgium) R Collignon | 6 | 7
LL | (Israel) E Leshem | 4 | 5

Semifinals
(Romania) FC Jianu | 6 | 6
8 | (Belgium) R Collignon | 3 | 2
