= 2024 Oeiras Indoors =

- Date: 1 – 7 January
- Edition: 3rd
- Surface: Hard (indoor)
- Location: Oeiras, Portugal

Champions

Singles
- (Poland) Maks Kaśnikowski

Doubles
- (United Kingdom) Jay Clarke / (United Kingdom) Marcus Willis
← 2023 ·	Oeiras Indoors	· 2024 →

The 2024 Oeiras Indoors was a professional tennis tournament played on hard courts. It was the 3rd edition of the tournament which was part of the 2024 ATP Challenger Tour. It took place in Oeiras, Portugal from 1 to 7 January 2024.

== Singles main-draw entrants ==
=== Seeds ===
Country	Player	Rank^{1}	Seed
POR	Henrique Rocha	246	1
POR	João Sousa	249	2
TUR	Cem İlkel	255	3
FRA	Maxime Janvier	258	4
BUL	Adrian Andreev	265	5
FRA	Valentin Royer	276	6
FRA	Mathias Bourgue	278	7
BEL	Michael Geerts	286	8

- ^{1} Rankings are as of 25 December 2023.

=== Other entrants ===
The following players received wildcards into the singles main draw:

- (Portugal) João Domingues
- (Portugal) Jaime Faria
- (Portugal) Tiago Pereira

The following players received entry into the singles main draw using protected rankings:

- (Spain) Nicolás Álvarez Varona
- (United Kingdom) Paul Jubb

The following players received entry from the qualifying draw:

- (United Kingdom) Jay Clarke
- (France) Kenny de Schepper
- Egor Gerasimov
- (United Kingdom) Alastair Gray
- (United States) Noah Rubin
- (Italy) Samuel Vincent Ruggeri

The following player received entry as a lucky loser:

- (Ukraine) Vadym Ursu

== Champions ==
=== Singles ===
- (Poland) Maks Kaśnikowski def. (Portugal) Gastão Elias 7–6^{(7–1)}, 4–6, 6–3.

=== Doubles ===
- (United Kingdom) Jay Clarke / (United Kingdom) Marcus Willis def. (France) Théo Arribagé / (Belgium) Michael Geerts 6–4, 6–7^{(9–11)}, [10–3].
