= 2025 Oeiras Indoors II =

- Date: 13 – 19 January
- Edition: 6th
- Category: ATP Challenger Tour 100
- Surface: Hard (indoor)
- Location: Oeiras, Portugal

Champions

Singles
- (United States) Aleksandar Kovacevic

Doubles
- (Croatia) Mili Poljičak / (Serbia) Matej Sabanov
← 2025 ·	Oeiras Indoors	· 2025 →

The 2025 Oeiras Indoors II was a professional tennis tournament played on hard courts. It was the 6th edition of the tournament which was part of the 2025 ATP Challenger Tour. It took place in Oeiras, Portugal from 13 to 19 January 2025.

== Singles main-draw entrants ==
=== Seeds ===
Country	Player	Rank^{1}	Seed
USA	Aleksandar Kovacevic	108	1
SRB	Hamad Medjedovic	112	2
SUI	Alexander Ritschard	121	3
USA	Mackenzie McDonald	130	4
GBR	Dan Evans	160	5
POR	Henrique Rocha	174	6
GER	Maximilian Marterer	187	7
FRA	Clément Chidekh	191	8

- ^{1} Rankings are as of 6 January 2025.

=== Other entrants ===
The following players received wildcards into the singles main draw:

- (Portugal) Pedro Araújo
- (Portugal) Gastão Elias
- (Portugal) Frederico Ferreira Silva

The following players received entry from the qualifying draw:

- (France) Robin Bertrand
- (Lithuania) Edas Butvilas
- (Turkey) Ergi Kırkın
- (Ukraine) Oleksandr Ovcharenko
- (Portugal) Tiago Pereira
- (United States) JJ Wolf

== Champions ==
=== Singles ===
- (United States) Aleksandar Kovacevic def. (Hungary) Zsombor Piros 6–4, 7–6^{(7–4)}.

=== Doubles ===
- (Croatia) Mili Poljičak / (Serbia) Matej Sabanov def. (Spain) Íñigo Cervantes / (Netherlands) Mick Veldheer 6–0, 6–1.
