= 2026 Oeiras Indoors – Doubles =

Doubles
- 2026 Oeiras Indoors

Final
- Champions: (Canada) Cleeve Harper (United Kingdom) David Stevenson
- Runners-up: (Portugal) Francisco Rocha (Portugal) Tiago Torres
- Score: 6–3, 3–6, [12–10]

Events
Singles	Doubles
- Oeiras Indoors

Liam Draxl and Cleeve Harper were the defending champions but only Harper chose to defend his title, partnering David Stevenson. He successfully defended his title after defeating Francisco Rocha and Tiago Torres 6–3, 3–6, [12–10] in the final.

== Seeds ==
1. (Denmark) Johannes Ingildsen / (Netherlands) Mick Veldheer (first round)
2. (Canada) Cleeve Harper / (United Kingdom) David Stevenson (champions)
3. (Ukraine) Denys Molchanov / (Austria) David Pichler (quarterfinals, retired)
4. (Colombia) Nicolás Barrientos / (United States) Benjamin Kittay (semifinals)

== Draw ==
Key

- Q = Qualifier
- WC = Wild card
- LL = Lucky loser
- Alt = Alternate
- ITF = ITF entry
- PR = Protected ranking
- SR = Special ranking
- SE = Special exempt
- JE = Junior exempt
- JR = Junior Accelerator Programme entrant
- CO = College Accelerator Programme entrant
- NG = Next Gen Accelerator Program entrant
- w/o = Walkover
- r = Retired
- d = Defaulted

First round
1	(Denmark) J Ingildsen (Netherlands) M Veldheer	6^{4}	2
(United Kingdom) B Jones (United Kingdom) J Paris	7^{7}	6
WC	(Portugal) Francisco Rocha (Portugal) T Torres	7^{8}	6
(United Kingdom) B Harris (Spain) D Vega Hernández	6^{6}	1
3	(Ukraine) D Molchanov (Austria) D Pichler	6	1	[10]
WC	(Portugal) G Elias (Portugal) T Pereira	1	6	[6]
(United States) T Hilderbrand (Poland) S Walków	6	1	[8]
(Lithuania) V Gaubas (Italy) F Passaro	3	6	[10]
(United States) N Lammons (United States) J Withrow	2	5
(Peru) A Merino (Germany) C Negritu	6	7
(Israel) D Cukierman (France) A Reymond	3	6^{5}
4	(Colombia) N Barrientos (United States) B Kittay	6	7^{7}
(Poland) S Kielan (Poland) F Pieczonka	3	4
(Czech Republic) Z Kolář (Spain) S Martos Gornés	6	6
(Bulgaria) A Donski (Serbia) S Latinović	6^{6}	4
2	(Canada) C Harper (United Kingdom) D Stevenson	7^{8}	6

Quarterfinals
(United Kingdom) B Jones (United Kingdom) J Paris	4	4
WC	(Portugal) F Rocha (Portugal) T Torres	6	6
3	(Ukraine) D Molchanov (Austria) D Pichler	5	0^{r}
(Lithuania) V Gaubas (Italy) F Passaro	7	0
(Peru) A Merino (Germany) C Negritu	0	2
4	(Colombia) N Barrientos (United States) B Kittay	6	6
(Czech Republic) Z Kolář (Spain) S Martos Gornés	2	2
2	(Canada) C Harper (United Kingdom) D Stevenson	6	6

Semifinals
WC	(Portugal) F Rocha (Portugal) T Torres	6	1
(Lithuania) V Gaubas (Italy) F Passaro	4	2^{r}
4	(Colombia) N Barrientos (United States) B Kittay	3	4
2	(Canada) C Harper (United Kingdom) D Stevenson	6	6

Final
WC	(Portugal) F Rocha (Portugal) T Torres	3	6	[10]
2	(Canada) C Harper (United Kingdom) D Stevenson	6	3	[12]
