= 2023 Oeiras Indoors – Doubles =

Doubles
- 2023 Oeiras Indoors

Final
- Champions: (Romania) Victor Vlad Cornea (Czech Republic) Petr Nouza
- Runners-up: (France) Jonathan Eysseric (France) Pierre-Hugues Herbert
- Score: 6–3, 7–6^{(7–3)}

Events
| Singles | Doubles |
- Oeiras Indoors

This was the first edition of the tournament.

Victor Vlad Cornea and Petr Nouza won the title after defeating Jonathan Eysseric and Pierre-Hugues Herbert 6–3, 7–6^{(7–3)} in the final.

== Seeds ==
1. (France) Jonathan Eysseric / (France) Pierre-Hugues Herbert (final)
2. (Germany) Constantin Frantzen / (Germany) Hendrik Jebens (semifinals)
3. (United Kingdom) Luke Johnson / (Netherlands) Sem Verbeek (semifinals)
4. (Romania) Victor Vlad Cornea / (Czech Republic) Petr Nouza (champions)

== Draw ==
Key

- Q = Qualifier
- WC = Wild card
- LL = Lucky loser
- Alt = Alternate
- ITF = ITF entry
- PR = Protected ranking
- SR = Special ranking
- SE = Special exempt
- JE = Junior exempt
- JR = Junior Accelerator Programme entrant
- CO = College Accelerator Programme entrant
- NG = Next Gen Accelerator Program entrant
- w/o = Walkover
- r = Retired
- d = Defaulted

First round
1 | (France) J Eysseric (France) P-H Herbert | 6 | 6
(Croatia) Z Babić (United Kingdom) S Duncan | 1 | 4
(Germany) Elmar Ejupovic (Germany) L Wessels | 5 | 6 | [9]
(Belgium) R Collignon (Romania) FC Jianu | 7 | 2 | [11]
3 | (United Kingdom) L Johnson (Netherlands) S Verbeek | 6 | 6
(Germany) R Molleker (Austria) L Neumayer | 3 | 2
WC | (Portugal) Fábio Coelho (Portugal) Gonçalo Falcão | 7^{7} | 6
(Portugal) F Cabral (Portugal) J Faria | 6^{5} | 4
(Switzerland) L Margaroli (Portugal) G Oliveira | 6^{5} | 6 | [10]
WC | (Portugal) J Domingues (Portugal) P Sousa | 7^{7} | 4 | [12]
(United Kingdom) J Clarke (Italy) GM Moroni | 0 | 2
4 | (Romania) VV Cornea (Czech Republic) P Nouza | 6 | 6
(Italy) M Gigante (Italy) Samuel Vincent Ruggeri | 6 | 0 | [7]
(Tunisia) A Dougaz (France) C Tabur | 3 | 6 | [10]
(Brazil) G Décamps (Monaco) V Vacherot | 4 | 4
2 | (Germany) C Frantzen (Germany) H Jebens | 6 | 6

Quarterfinals
1 | (France) J Eysseric (France) P-H Herbert | 6 | 6
(Belgium) R Collignon (Romania) FC Jianu | 4 | 3
3 | (United Kingdom) L Johnson (Netherlands) S Verbeek | 7^{7} | 6^{3} | [10]
WC | (Portugal) F Coelho (Portugal) G Falcão | 6^{3} | 7^{7} | [7]
WC | (Portugal) J Domingues (Portugal) P Sousa | 3 | 6^{0}
4 | (Romania) VV Cornea (Czech Republic) P Nouza | 6 | 7^{7}
(Tunisia) A Dougaz (France) C Tabur | 6 | 4 | [7]
2 | (Germany) C Frantzen (Germany) H Jebens | 4 | 6 | [10]

Semifinals
1 | (France) J Eysseric (France) P-H Herbert | 6 | 6
3 | (United Kingdom) L Johnson (Netherlands) S Verbeek | 2 | 3
4 | (Romania) VV Cornea (Czech Republic) P Nouza | 5 | 7^{7} | [10]
2 | (Germany) C Frantzen (Germany) H Jebens | 7 | 6^{5} | [4]

Final
1 | (France) J Eysseric (France) P-H Herbert | 3 | 6^{3}
4 | (Romania) VV Cornea (Czech Republic) P Nouza | 6 | 7^{7}
