= 2025 Oeiras Indoors III – Singles =

Singles
- 2025 Oeiras Indoors III

Final
- Champion: (Belgium) Alexander Blockx
- Runner-up: (Canada) Liam Draxl
- Score: 7–5, 6–1

Events
Singles	Doubles
- Oeiras Indoors

Aleksandar Kovacevic was the defending champion but chose not to defend his title.

Alexander Blockx won the title after defeating Liam Draxl 7–5, 6–1 in the final.

== Seeds ==
1. (Hungary) Márton Fucsovics (second round)
2. (United States) Christopher Eubanks (first round)
3. (Netherlands) Jesper de Jong (first round)
4. (Switzerland) Alexander Ritschard (first round)
5. (Belgium) Raphaël Collignon (first round)
6. (Germany) Dominik Koepfer (first round)
7. (Portugal) Jaime Faria (first round)
8. (Slovakia) Lukáš Klein (first round)

== Draw ==
Key

- Q = Qualifier
- WC = Wild card
- LL = Lucky loser
- Alt = Alternate
- ITF = ITF entry
- PR = Protected ranking
- SR = Special ranking
- SE = Special exempt
- JE = Junior exempt
- JR = Junior Accelerator Programme entrant
- CO = College Accelerator Programme entrant
- NG = Next Gen Accelerator Program entrant
- w/o = Walkover
- r = Retired
- d = Defaulted

=== Finals ===
Semifinals
(Canada) Alexis Galarneau	4	6	2
Q	(Canada) Liam Draxl	6	4	6
(Belgium) Alexander Blockx	7	7
Q	(Estonia) Mark Lajal	5	5

Final
Q	(Canada) Liam Draxl	5	1
(Belgium) Alexander Blockx	7	6

=== Top half ===
First round
1	(Hungary) M Fucsovics	6	6^{3}	6
(Spain) A Moro Cañas	4	7^{7}	3
WC	(Portugal) F Ferreira Silva	3	6	5
(Canada) A Galarneau	6	2	7
(France) V Royer	6	6
Q	(Peru) I Buse	0	2
Q	(Kazakhstan) D Yevseyev	6	6
8	(Slovakia) L Klein	4	0
3	(Netherlands) J de Jong	4	5
Q	(Canada) L Draxl	6	7
WC	(Portugal) Pedro Araújo	7^{9}	6
(United Kingdom) J Choinski	6^{7}	4
(France) C Chidekh	4	6	6^{5}
Alt	(Bulgaria) A Andreev	6	4	7^{7}
Alt	(Colombia) N Mejía	6^{3}	7^{7}	6
6	(Germany) D Koepfer	7^{7}	6^{5}	3

Second round
1	(Hungary) M Fucsovics	3	4
(Canada) A Galarneau	6	6
(France) V Royer	6	2	6
Q	(Kazakhstan) D Yevseyev	2	6	4
Q	(Canada) L Draxl	6	6
WC	(Portugal) P Araújo	1	2
Alt	(Bulgaria) A Andreev
Alt	(Colombia) N Mejía	w/o

Quarterfinals
(Canada) A Galarneau	6	7^{8}
(France) V Royer	4	6^{6}
Q	(Canada) L Draxl	7^{7}	7
Alt	(Colombia) N Mejía	6^{3}	5

Semifinals
(Canada) A Galarneau	4	6	2
Q	(Canada) L Draxl	6	4	6

=== Bottom half ===
First round
7	(Portugal) J Faria	3	2
(Switzerland) M-A Hüsler	6	6
Alt	(Georgia (country)) N Basilashvili	6	6
(Moldova) R Albot	3	4
Q	(Spain) D Rincón	1	6	0
(Austria) J Rodionov	6	1	6
(Belgium) A Blockx	7^{7}	3	6
4	(Switzerland) A Ritschard	6^{3}	6	2
5	(Belgium) R Collignon	3	2
(Kazakhstan) D Popko	6	6
Q	(Kazakhstan) B Zhukayev	6	6
WC	(Portugal) G Elias	3	2
(Portugal) H Rocha	6	2	6^{5}
Q	(Estonia) M Lajal	3	6	7^{7}
(Japan) Y Uchiyama	7^{8}	6
2	(United States) C Eubanks	6^{6}	4

Second round
(Switzerland) M-A Hüsler	6	2	2
Alt	(Georgia (country)) N Basilashvili	4	6	6
(Austria) J Rodionov	0	6	3
(Belgium) A Blockx	6	2	6
(Kazakhstan) D Popko	3	6^{3}
Q	(Kazakhstan) B Zhukayev	6	7^{7}
Q	(Estonia) M Lajal	6	6
(Japan) Y Uchiyama	3	2

Quarterfinals
Alt	(Georgia (country)) N Basilashvili	3	4
(Belgium) A Blockx	6	6
Q	(Kazakhstan) B Zhukayev	7	6^{5}	4
Q	(Estonia) M Lajal	5	7^{7}	6

Semifinals
(Belgium) A Blockx	7	7
Q	(Estonia) M Lajal	5	5
