= 2026 Oeiras Indoors II =

- Date: 26 January – 1 February
- Edition: 9th
- Surface: Hard (indoor)
- Location: Oeiras, Portugal

Champions

Singles
- (Luxembourg) Chris Rodesch

Doubles
- (Czech Republic) Filip Duda / (Czech Republic) Zdeněk Kolář
- Oeiras Indoors

The 2026 Oeiras Indoors II was a professional tennis tournament played on hard courts. It was the 9th edition of the tournament which was part of the 2026 ATP Challenger Tour. It took place in Oeiras, Portugal from 26 January to 1 February 2026.

== Singles main-draw entrants ==
=== Seeds ===
Country	Player	Rank^{1}	Seed
DEN	Elmer Møller	119	1
LTU	Vilius Gaubas	129	2
ESP	Martín Landaluce	149	3
POR	Jaime Faria	151	4
POR	Henrique Rocha	158	5
AUT	Jurij Rodionov	167	6
~~HUN~~	~~Zsombor Piros~~	~~170~~	~~7~~
CZE	Zdeněk Kolář	176	8

- ^{1} Rankings are as of 19 January 2026.

=== Other entrants ===
The following players received wildcards into the singles main draw:

- (Portugal) Gastão Elias
- (Spain) Martín Landaluce
- (Portugal) Tiago Torres

The following player received entry into the singles main draw through the Next Gen Accelerator programme:

- (Czech Republic) Petr Brunclík

The following players received entry into the singles main draw as alternates:

- (Portugal) Tiago Pereira
- (Germany) Patrick Zahraj

The following players received entry from the qualifying draw:

- (Ecuador) Andrés Andrade
- (Germany) Diego Dedura
- (France) Mathys Erhard
- (Kazakhstan) Mikhail Kukushkin
- (Spain) Iñaki Montes de la Torre
- (Germany) Mats Rosenkranz

The following player received entry as a lucky loser:

- (Colombia) Adrià Soriano Barrera

== Champions ==
=== Singles ===
- (Luxembourg) Chris Rodesch def. (Estonia) Daniil Glinka 6–3, 7–5.

=== Doubles ===
- (Czech Republic) Filip Duda / (Czech Republic) Zdeněk Kolář def. (Sweden) Erik Grevelius / (Sweden) Adam Heinonen 6–3, 6–4.
