= 2023 Oeiras Indoors II – Singles =

Singles
- 2023 Oeiras Indoors II

Final
- Champion: (France) Arthur Fils
- Runner-up: (Belgium) Joris De Loore
- Score: 6–1, 7–6^{(7–4)}

Events
Singles	Doubles
- Oeiras Indoors

Joris De Loore was the defending champion but lost in the final to Arthur Fils.

Fils won the title after defeating De Loore 6–1, 7–6^{(7–4)} in the final.

== Seeds ==
1. (Lithuania) Ričardas Berankis (semifinals)
2. (United Kingdom) Jay Clarke (second round)
3. (Italy) Matteo Gigante (first round)
4. (France) Arthur Fils (champion)
5. (Serbia) Hamad Međedović (first round)
6. (France) Harold Mayot (first round)
7. (Spain) Nikolás Sánchez Izquierdo (first round)
8. (Canada) Steven Diez (first round)

== Draw ==
Key

- Q = Qualifier
- WC = Wild card
- LL = Lucky loser
- Alt = Alternate
- ITF = ITF entry
- PR = Protected ranking
- SR = Special ranking
- SE = Special exempt
- JE = Junior exempt
- JR = Junior Accelerator Programme entrant
- CO = College Accelerator Programme entrant
- NG = Next Gen Accelerator Program entrant
- w/o = Walkover
- r = Retired
- d = Defaulted

=== Finals ===
Semifinals
1	(Lithuania) Ričardas Berankis	5	3
4	(France) Arthur Fils	7	6
(France) Pierre-Hugues Herbert	2	4
SE	(Belgium) Joris De Loore	6	6

Final
4	(France) Arthur Fils	6	7^{7}
SE	(Belgium) Joris De Loore	1	6^{4}

=== Top half ===
First round
1	(Lithuania) R Berankis	7^{7}	6
(Hungary) M Valkusz	6^{3}	1
Q	(Estonia) M Lajal	4	4^{r}
(Germany) Lucas Gerch	6	5
E Karlovskiy	0	0^{r}
Q	(Croatia) D Prižmić	6	3
Q	(Germany) S Fanselow	6	3	6
6	(France) H Mayot	2	6	4
4	(France) A Fils	6	0	6
(Germany) L Wessels	3	6	2
(Portugal) J Domingues	2	3
Q	(Turkey) C İlkel	6	6
(Austria) L Neumayer	2	2
WC	(Portugal) G Oliveira	6	6
(Austria) M Neuchrist	4	6	7
8	(Canada) S Diez	6	3	5

Second round
1	(Lithuania) R Berankis	5	6	6
(Germany) L Gerch	7	4	4
Q	(Croatia) D Prižmić	2	6	6
Q	(Germany) S Fanselow	6	2	2
4	(France) A Fils	7	6
Q	(Turkey) C İlkel	5	2
WC	(Portugal) G Oliveira	6^{4}	3
(Austria) M Neuchrist	7^{7}	6

Quarterfinals
1	(Lithuania) R Berankis	7	7^{8}
Q	(Croatia) D Prižmić	5	6^{6}
4	(France) A Fils	6	6
(Austria) M Neuchrist	3	1

Semifinals
1	(Lithuania) R Berankis	5	3
4	(France) A Fils	7	6

=== Bottom half ===
First round
7	(Spain) N Sánchez Izquierdo	6^{3}	3
WC	(Portugal) P Sousa	7^{7}	6
Q	(Brazil) G Décamps	6^{1}	7^{7}	4
(Spain) P Martín Tiffon	7^{7}	6^{5}	6
(Tunisia) A Dougaz	4	5
(Romania) FC Jianu	6	7
(France) P-H Herbert	3	6	6
3	(Italy) M Gigante	6	4	4
5	(Serbia) H Međedović	6^{4}	3
SE	(Belgium) J De Loore	7^{7}	6
(Monaco) V Vacherot	5	4
(Belgium) R Collignon	7	6
Q	(Germany) Elmar Ejupovic	4	5
(Italy) L Giustino	6	7
WC	(Portugal) J Faria	4	3
2	(United Kingdom) J Clarke	6	6

Second round
WC	(Portugal) P Sousa	3	7	6
(Spain) P Martín Tiffon	6	5	4
(Romania) FC Jianu	6	3	2
(France) P-H Herbert	3	6	6
SE	(Belgium) J De Loore	6	6
(Belgium) R Collignon	4	3
(Italy) L Giustino	6	7^{7}
2	(United Kingdom) J Clarke	3	6^{4}

Quarterfinals
WC	(Portugal) P Sousa	1	4
(France) P-H Herbert	6	6
SE	(Belgium) J De Loore	6	6
(Italy) L Giustino	2	4

Semifinals
(France) P-H Herbert	2	4
SE	(Belgium) J De Loore	6	6
