= 2023 Oeiras Indoors II – Doubles =

Doubles
- 2023 Oeiras Indoors II

Final
- Champions: (Netherlands) Sander Arends (Netherlands) David Pel
- Runners-up: (Finland) Patrik Niklas-Salminen (Netherlands) Bart Stevens
- Score: 6–3, 7–6^{(7–3)}

Events
Singles	Doubles
- Oeiras Indoors

Victor Vlad Cornea and Petr Nouza were the defending champions but chose to defend their title with different partners. Cornea partnered Sergio Martos Gornés but lost in the semifinals to Sander Arends and David Pel. Nouza partnered Vitaliy Sachko but lost in the first round to Cornea and Martos Gornés.

Arends and Pel won the title after defeating Patrik Niklas-Salminen and Bart Stevens 6–3, 7–6^{(7–3)} in the final.

== Seeds ==
1. (Netherlands) Sander Arends / (Netherlands) David Pel (champions)
2. (France) Jonathan Eysseric / (Ukraine) Denys Molchanov (quarterfinals)
3. (Romania) Victor Vlad Cornea / (Spain) Sergio Martos Gornés (semifinals)
4. (Finland) Patrik Niklas-Salminen / (Netherlands) Bart Stevens (final)

== Draw ==
Key

- Q = Qualifier
- WC = Wild card
- LL = Lucky loser
- Alt = Alternate
- ITF = ITF entry
- PR = Protected ranking
- SR = Special ranking
- SE = Special exempt
- JE = Junior exempt
- JR = Junior Accelerator Programme entrant
- CO = College Accelerator Programme entrant
- NG = Next Gen Accelerator Program entrant
- w/o = Walkover
- r = Retired
- d = Defaulted

First round
1	(Netherlands) S Arends (Netherlands) D Pel	6	6
(Switzerland) L Margaroli (Portugal) G Oliveira	4	4
(United Kingdom) L Johnson (Netherlands) S Verbeek	6	7^{7}
WC	(Portugal) J Domingues (Portugal) P Sousa	4	6^{5}
3	(Romania) VV Cornea (Spain) S Martos Gornés	6	6
(Czech Republic) P Nouza (Ukraine) V Sachko	2	2
(Germany) F Fallert (Germany) L Wessels	7^{7}	6
(Germany) Lucas Gerch (Austria) M Neuchrist	6^{2}	4
WC	(Portugal) Fábio Coelho (Portugal) J Faria	1	6	[10]
(Tunisia) A Dougaz (Zimbabwe) CJ Lock	6	4	[4]
(Canada) S Diez (Spain) N Sánchez Izquierdo	3	2
4	(Finland) P Niklas-Salminen (Netherlands) B Stevens	6	6
(Germany) C Frantzen (Germany) H Jebens	6	6
I Liutarevich (Ukraine) V Manafov	2	2
(Uzbekistan) S Fayziev; E Karlovskiy	1	2
2	(France) J Eysseric (Ukraine) D Molchanov	6	6

Quarterfinals
1	(Netherlands) S Arends (Netherlands) D Pel	6	1	[10]
(United Kingdom) L Johnson (Netherlands) S Verbeek	2	6	[8]
3	(Romania) VV Cornea (Spain) S Martos Gornés	6	6
(Germany) F Fallert (Germany) L Wessels	3	4
WC	(Portugal) F Coelho (Portugal) J Faria	6	6^{5}	[3]
4	(Finland) P Niklas-Salminen (Netherlands) B Stevens	4	7^{7}	[10]
(Germany) C Frantzen (Germany) H Jebens	6	6
2	(France) J Eysseric (Ukraine) D Molchanov	2	3

Semifinals
1	(Netherlands) S Arends (Netherlands) D Pel	6	6
3	(Romania) VV Cornea (Spain) S Martos Gornés	3	3
4	(Finland) P Niklas-Salminen (Netherlands) B Stevens	7	6
(Germany) C Frantzen (Germany) H Jebens	5	4

Final
1	(Netherlands) S Arends (Netherlands) D Pel	6	7^{7}
4	(Finland) P Niklas-Salminen (Netherlands) B Stevens	3	6^{3}
