= 2023 Oeiras Indoors =

- Date: 2 – 8 January
- Edition: 1st
- Surface: Hard (indoor)
- Location: Oeiras, Portugal

Champions

Singles
- (Belgium) Joris De Loore

Doubles
- (Romania) Victor Vlad Cornea / (Czech Republic) Petr Nouza
- Oeiras Indoors

The 2023 Oeiras Indoors was a professional tennis tournament played on hard courts. It was the 1st edition of the tournament which was part of the 2023 ATP Challenger Tour. It took place in Oeiras, Portugal from 2 to 8 January 2023.

== Singles main-draw entrants ==
=== Seeds ===
Country	Player	Rank^{1}	Seed
LTU	Ričardas Berankis	168	1
GBR	Jay Clarke	240	2
ITA	Matteo Gigante	250	3
SRB	Hamad Međedović	255	4
TUN	Aziz Dougaz	273	5
AUT	Maximilian Neuchrist	274	6
HUN	Máté Valkusz	275	7
BEL	Raphaël Collignon	280	8

- ^{1} Rankings are as of 26 December 2022.

=== Other entrants ===
The following players received wildcards into the singles main draw:

- (Portugal) Jaime Faria
- (Portugal) Gonçalo Oliveira
- (Portugal) Pedro Sousa

The following players received entry from the qualifying draw:

- (Belgium) Joris De Loore
- (France) Kenny de Schepper
- (Turkey) Cem İlkel
- Alibek Kachmazov
- (Estonia) Mark Lajal
- (Croatia) Dino Prižmić

The following player received entry as a lucky loser:

- (Israel) Edan Leshem

== Champions ==
=== Singles ===
- (Belgium) Joris De Loore def. (Romania) Filip Cristian Jianu 6–3, 6–2.

=== Doubles ===
- (Romania) Victor Vlad Cornea / (Czech Republic) Petr Nouza def. (France) Jonathan Eysseric / (France) Pierre-Hugues Herbert 6–3, 7–6^{(7–3)}.
