= 2023 Oeiras Indoors II =

- Date: 9 – 14 January
- Edition: 2nd
- Surface: Hard (indoor)
- Location: Oeiras, Portugal

Champions

Singles
- (France) Arthur Fils

Doubles
- (Netherlands) Sander Arends / (Netherlands) David Pel
- Oeiras Indoors

The 2023 Oeiras Indoors II was a professional tennis tournament played on hard courts. It was the 2nd edition of the tournament which was part of the 2023 ATP Challenger Tour. It took place in Oeiras, Portugal from 9 to 14 January 2023.

== Singles main-draw entrants ==
=== Seeds ===
Country	Player	Rank^{1}	Seed
LTU	Ričardas Berankis	168	1
GBR	Jay Clarke	240	2
ITA	Matteo Gigante	250	3
FRA	Arthur Fils	251	4
SRB	Hamad Međedović	255	5
FRA	Harold Mayot	256	6
ESP	Nikolás Sánchez Izquierdo	267	7
CAN	Steven Diez	272	8

- ^{1} Rankings are as of 2 January 2023.

=== Other entrants ===
The following players received wildcards into the singles main draw:

- (Portugal) Jaime Faria
- (Portugal) Gonçalo Oliveira
- (Portugal) Pedro Sousa

The following player received entry into the singles main draw as a special exempt:

- (Belgium) Joris De Loore

The following players received entry from the qualifying draw:

- (Brazil) Gabriel Décamps
- (Germany) Elmar Ejupovic
- (Germany) Sebastian Fanselow
- (Turkey) Cem İlkel
- (Estonia) Mark Lajal
- (Croatia) Dino Prižmić

== Champions ==
=== Singles ===
- (France) Arthur Fils def. (Belgium) Joris De Loore 6–1, 7–6^{(7–4)}.

=== Doubles ===
- (Netherlands) Sander Arends / (Netherlands) David Pel def. (Finland) Patrik Niklas-Salminen / (Netherlands) Bart Stevens 6–3, 7–6^{(7–3)}.
