= Joris De Loore =

Belgian tennis player (born 1993)

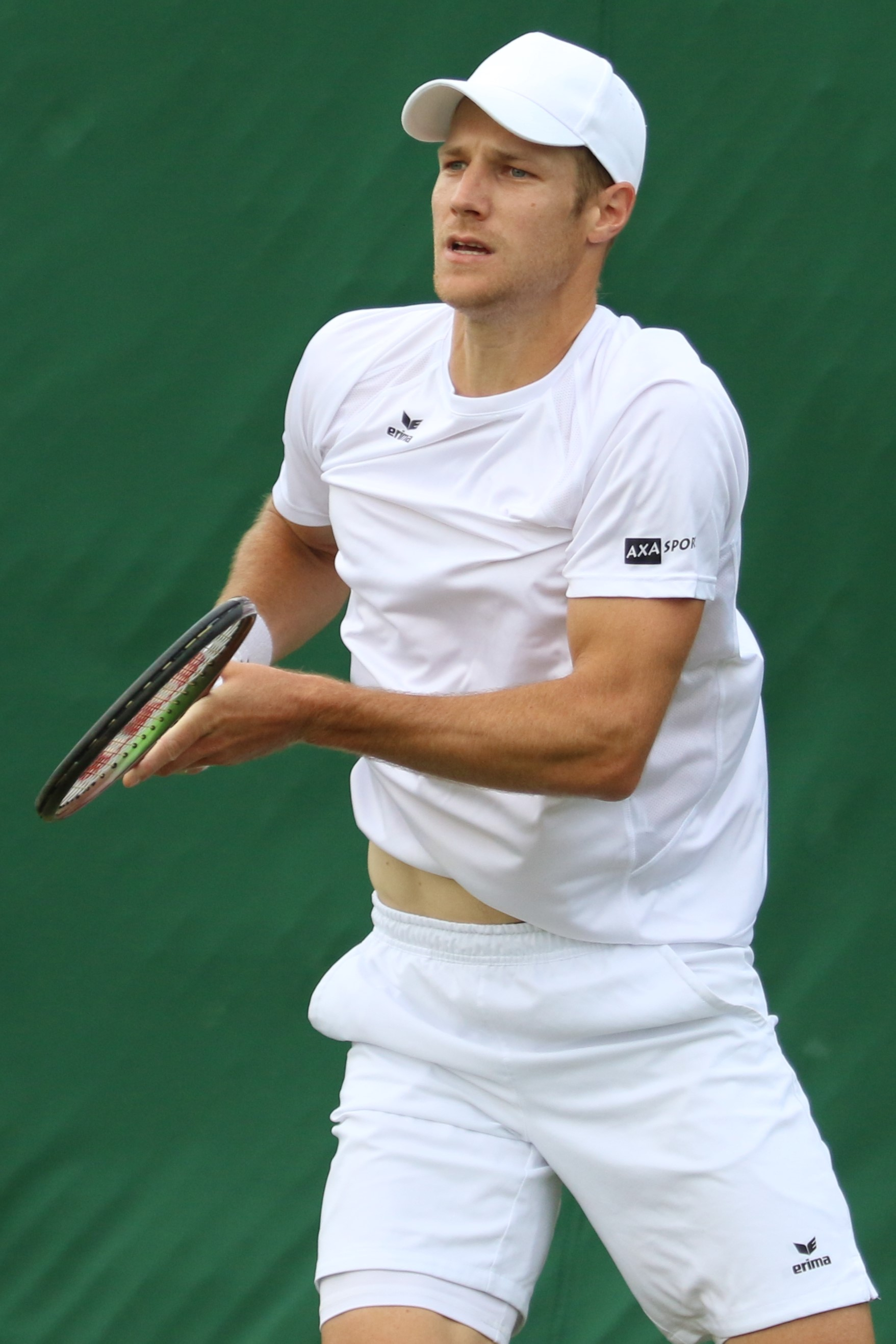
- De Loore at the 2023 Wimbledon Championships
- Country (sports): Belgium
- Born: 21 April 1993 (age 33) Bruges, Belgium
- Height: 1.91 m (6 ft 3 in)
- Turned pro: 2011
- Plays: Right-handed (two-handed-backhand)
- Coach: Tom Dermaut
- Prize money: US $612,722

Singles
- Career record: 3–5
- Career titles: 0
- Highest ranking: No. 142 (6 November 2023)
- Current ranking: No. 1,141 (20 July 2026)

Grand Slam singles results
- Australian Open: Q2 (2024)
- French Open: Q2 (2017, 2024)
- Wimbledon: Q3 (2017)
- US Open: Q3 (2017, 2023)

Doubles
- Career record: 2–5
- Career titles: 0
- Highest ranking: No. 263 (24 December 2018)

Team competitions
- Davis Cup: F (2017)
- Last updated on: 21 July 2026.

Joris De Loore (born 21 April 1993) is a Belgian professional tennis player. He has a career-high ATP singles ranking of world No. 142, achieved on 6 November 2023 and a doubles ranking of No. 263, achieved on 24 December 2018. He competes mainly on the ATP Challenger Tour.

De Loore has represented Belgium at the Davis Cup where he has a W/L record of 3–4.

== Career ==
=== 2016: ATP debut ===
In 2016, he made his ATP Tour debut, where he pushed future top 10 star Taylor Fritz to three sets in a close match 6–3 4–6 4–6 defeat in Antwerp. As a result, he reached his career high ranking of No. 174 on 17 October 2016.

=== 2023: Maiden Challenger title, top 150 ===
In January 2023, he won his maiden Challenger in Oeiras becoming the oldest first time winner at 29 since 2015, when Italian Luca Vanni won his maiden title at 30. He then reached the final in the second edition of the Challenger in Oeiras and moved close to 50 positions up to No. 219 on 16 January 2023. He reached the top 150 following a semifinal at the new 2023 Olbia Challenger on 23 October 2023.

=== 2024: Fifth Challenger final ===
In February, De Loore reached his fifth Challenger final at the Play In Challenger in Lille, France, losing to Arthur Rinderknech in the final.

== ATP Challenger Tour Finals ==
=== Singles: 6 (1 title, 5 runner-ups) ===
Legend ATP Challenger Tour (1–5)	Finals by surface Hard (1–4) Clay (0–1)

Result	W–L	Date	Tournament	Tier	Surface	Opponent	Score
Loss	0–1	Sep 2016	Trophée des Alpilles, France	Challenger	Hard	(Russia) Daniil Medvedev	3–6, 3–6
Win	1–1	Jan 2023	Oeiras Indoors, Portugal	Challenger	Hard (i)	(Romania) Filip Cristian Jianu	6–3, 6–2
Loss	1–2	Jan 2023	Oeiras Indoors II, Portugal	Challenger	Hard (i)	(France) Arthur Fils	1–6, 6–7^{(4–7)}
Loss	1–3	Jul 2023	Zug Open, Switzerland	Challenger	Clay	(France) Arthur Rinderknech	6–3, 3–6, 4–6
Loss	1–4	Oct 2023	Slovak Open, Slovakia	Challenger	Hard (i)	(Canada) Gabriel Diallo	0–6, 5–7
Loss	1–5	Feb 2024	Play In Challenger, France	Challenger	Hard (i)	(France) Arthur Rinderknech	4–6, 6–3, 6–7^{(8–10)}

== ITF Futures/World Tennis Tour Finals ==
=== Singles: 25 (12 titles, 13 runner-ups) ===
Legend ITF Futures/WTT (12–13)	Finals by surface Hard (8–4) Clay (4–9)

Result	W–L	Date	Tournament	Tier	Surface	Opponent	Score
Loss	0–1	Sep 2012	Belgium F10, Damme	Futures	Clay	(Belgium) Niels Desein	6–2, 2–6, 6–7^{(4–7)}
Loss	0–2	July 2013	Belgium F3, De Haan	Futures	Clay	(North Macedonia) Dimitar Grabul	5–7, 6–2, 4–6
Win	1–2	Jul 2013	Belgium F4, Knokke	Futures	Clay	(Belgium) Julien Cagnina	6–0, 6–2
Loss	1–3	Aug 2013	Belgium F9, Koksijde	Futures	Clay	(France) Grégoire Barrère	6–3, 5–7, 3–6
Loss	1–4	Aug 2013	Belgium F10, Jupille-sur-Meuse	Futures	Clay	(Belgium) Clément Geens	4–6, 6–0, 4–6
Loss	1–5	Oct 2013	Great Britain F22, Tipton	Futures	Hard (i)	(Lithuania) Laurynas Grigelis	3–6, 3–6
Loss	1–6	Nov 2013	Great Britain F23, Edgbaston	Futures	Hard (i)	(Lithuania) Laurynas Grigelis	3–6, 6–1, 0–6
Loss	1–7	Nov 2013	Turkey F46, Antalya	Futures	Hard	(Russia) Anton Zaitcev	3–6, 0–3 ret.
Win	2–7	Jun 2014	Belgium F1, Damme	Futures	Clay	(Belgium) Steve Darcis	7–5, 6–3
Loss	2–8	Nov 2014	Norway F2, Oslo	Futures	Hard (i)	(France) Julien Obry	2–6, 3–6
Loss	2–9	Jul 2015	Belgium F7, Knokke-Heist	Futures	Clay	(Belgium) Julien Cagnina	1–6, 1–3 ret.
Loss	2–10	Aug 2015	Belgium F9, Eupen	Futures	Clay	(Germany) Oscar Otte	6–4, 2–6, 3–6
Loss	2–11	Aug 2015	Belgium F10, Koksijde	Futures	Clay	(Belgium) Romain Barbosa	4–6, 3–6
Win	3–11	Dec 2015	Qatar F5, Doha	Futures	Hard	(South Korea) Hong Seong-chan	6–3, 6–2
Win	4–11	Dec 2015	Qatar F6, Doha	Futures	Hard	(United Kingdom) Luke Bambridge	6–3, 6–3
Win	5–11	Jan 2016	Turkey F3, Antalya	Futures	Hard	(Turkey) Anıl Yüksel	6–2, 6–3
Win	6–11	Jun 2016	Turkey F4, Antalya	Futures	Hard	(South Korea) Hong Seong-chan	6–4, 6–2
Loss	6–12	Mar 2016	Tunisia F11, Hammamet	Futures	Clay	(Portugal) Pedro Sousa	6–1, 1–6, 5–7
Win	7–12	Jun 2016	Netherlands F2, Breda	Futures	Clay	(Germany) Daniel Masur	6–2, 6–2
Loss	7–13	Aug 2021	M25 Koksijde, Belgium	WTT	Clay	(France) Matthieu Perchicot	3–6, 6–2, 5–7
Win	8–13	Oct 2021	M25 Toulouse-Balma, France	WTT	Hard	(France) Luca Van Assche	6–2, 7–5
Win	9–13	Apr 2022	M15 Monastir, Tunisia	WTT	Hard	(Poland) Szymon Kielan	6–4, 6−3
Win	10–13	Jun 2022	M25 Kiseljak, Bosnia and Herzegovina	WTT	Clay	(Lebanon) Hady Habib	6–4, 5−7, 6−3
Win	11–13	Sep 2022	M25 Bagnères-de-Bigorre, France	WTT	Hard	(Estonia) Mark Lajal	6–3, 6−0
Win	12–13	Jan 2025	M25 Hazebrouck, France	WTT	Hard (i)	(France) Arthur Géa	7–6^{(7–2)}, 6–7^{(5–7)}, 6–3

== Performance timeline ==
Key
W	F	SF	QF	#R	RR	Q#	DNQ	A	NH

(W) winner; (F) finalist; (SF) semifinalist; (QF) quarterfinalist; (#R) rounds 4, 3, 2, 1; (RR) round-robin stage; (Q#) qualification round; (DNQ) did not qualify; (A) absent; (NH) not held; (SR) strike rate (events won / competed); (W–L) win–loss record.
To avoid confusion and double counting, these charts are updated at the conclusion of a tournament or when the player's participation has ended.

=== Singles ===
Tournament	2016	2017	...	2023	2024	SR	W–L	Win %
Grand Slam tournaments
Australian Open	A	Q1		A	Q2	0 / 0	0–0	–
French Open	A	Q2		Q1	Q2	0 / 0	0–0	–
Wimbledon	A	Q3		Q1	Q2	0 / 0	0–0	–
US Open	Q2	Q3		Q3	Q2	0 / 0	0–0	–
Win–loss	0–0	0–0		0–0	0–0	0 / 0	0–0	–
