= Chris Rodesch =

Luxembourgish tennis player (born 2001)

- Rodesch at the 2026 Wimbledon Championships
- Country (sports): Luxembourg
- Born: 18 July 2001 (age 25)
- Plays: Right-Handed (Two-Handed Backhand)
- College: Virginia
- Prize money: US $483,804

Singles
- Career record: 6–5
- Career titles: 0; 1 Challenger
- Highest ranking: No. 137 (2 March 2026)
- Current ranking: No. 151 (24 August 2026)

Grand Slam singles results
- Australian Open: Q2 (2026)
- French Open: Q1 (2025, 2026)
- Wimbledon: 1R (2025)
- US Open: Q1 (2025)

Doubles
- Career record: 3–2
- Career titles: 0
- Highest ranking: No. 500 (28 July 2025)
- Current ranking: No. 1437 (15 June 2026)
- Last updated on: 21 June 2026.

Chris Rodesch (born 18 July 2001) is a Luxembourgish professional tennis player. He has a career-high ATP singles ranking of No. 137 achieved on 2 March 2026 and a doubles ranking of No. 500 reached on 28 July 2025. He is currently the No. 1 singles player from Luxembourg.

Rodesch represents his nation at the Davis Cup, where he has a W/L record of 16–13.

== Junior career ==
Rodesch had mixed results on the ITF junior circuit, maintaining a 62–31 singles win-loss record.

He reached an ITF junior combined ranking of No. 57 on 14 January 2019.

== College years ==
Rodesch played college tennis at the University of Virginia and won the 2022 NCAA Division I Men's Tennis Championships and 2023 NCAA Division I Men's Tennis Championships playing at position No. 1 for the Virginia Cavaliers.

== Professional career ==
=== 2024: Maiden Challenger final ===
In November, Rodesch reached his first ATP Challenger final in Drummondville, Canada, losing to American Aidan Mayo in the final.

=== 2025: First Challenger title, major debut, top 150 ===
In April, Rodesch won his first Challenger title in Tallahassee, United States. He defeated Emilio Nava in the final.

In July, he made his major debut at Wimbledon as a qualifier by defeating top seed Márton Fucsovics in the final qualifying round.

== Performance timeline ==
Key
W	F	SF	QF	#R	RR	Q#	DNQ	A	NH

(W) winner; (F) finalist; (SF) semifinalist; (QF) quarterfinalist; (#R) rounds 4, 3, 2, 1; (RR) round-robin stage; (Q#) qualification round; (DNQ) did not qualify; (A) absent; (NH) not held; (SR) strike rate (events won / competed); (W–L) win–loss record.
To avoid confusion and double counting, these charts are updated at the conclusion of a tournament or when the player's participation has ended.

=== Singles ===
Tournament	2025	2026	SR	W–L	Win %
Grand Slam tournaments
Australian Open	A	Q2	0 / 0	0–0	–
French Open	Q1	Q1	0 / 0	0–0	–
Wimbledon	1R	Q2	0 / 1	0–1	0%
US Open	Q1	A	0 / 0	0–0	–
Win–loss	0–1	0–0	0 / 1	0–1	0%
ATP Masters 1000
Indian Wells Masters	A	A	0 / 0	0–0	–
Miami Open	A	Q1	0 / 0	0–0	–
Monte Carlo Masters	A	A	0 / 0	0–0	–
Madrid Open	A	Q2	0 / 0	0–0	–
Italian Open	A	Q1	0 / 0	0–0	–
Canadian Open	A		0 / 0	0–0	–
Cincinnati Masters	A		0 / 0	0–0	–
Shanghai Masters	A		0 / 0	0–0	–
Paris Masters	A		0 / 0	0–0	–
Win–loss	0–0	0–0	0 / 0	0–0	–

== ATP Challenger Tour Finals ==
=== Singles: 5 (4 titles, 1 runner-up) ===
Legend ATP Challenger Tour (4–1)

Result	W–L	Date	Tournament	Tier	Surface	Opponent	Score
Loss	0–1	Nov 2024	Drummondville, Canada	Challenger	Hard (i)	(United States) Aidan Mayo	3–6, 6–3, 4–6
Win	1–1	Apr 2025	Tallahassee, United States	Challenger	Clay	(United States) Emilio Nava	4–6, 6–3, 6–4
Win	2–1	Jan 2026	Oeiras, Portugal	Challenger	Hard (i)	(Hungary) Zsombor Piros	6–4, 4–6, 6–2
Win	3–1	Jan 2026	Oeiras II, Portugal	Challenger	Hard (i)	(Estonia) Daniil Glinka	6–3, 7–5
Win	4–1	Jul 2026	Pozoblanco, Spain	Challenger	Hard	Ilya Ivashka	6–4, 2–6, 7–6^{(7–5)}

=== Doubles: 1 (runner-up) ===
Legend ATP Challenger Tour (0–1)

Result	W–L	Date	Tournament	Tier	Surface	Partner	Opponents	Score
Loss	0–1	Nov 2024	Charlottesville, United States	Challenger	Hard (i)	(United States) William Woodall	(United States) Robert Cash (United States) JJ Tracy	6–4, 6–7^{(7–9)}, [7–10]

== ITF World Tennis Tour finals ==
=== Singles: 11 (7 titles, 4 runner-ups) ===
Legend ITF WTT (7–4)	Finals by surface Hard (4–1) Clay (3–3)

Result	W–L	Date	Tournament	Tier	Surface	Opponent	Score
Loss	0–1	Jun 2022	M15 Duffel, Belgium	WTT	Clay	(Belgium) Gauthier Onclin	4–6, 3–6
Win	1–1	Jul 2022	M15 Vejle, Denmark	WTT	Clay	(Netherlands) Mick Veldheer	6–4, 4–6, 6–0
Loss	1–2	Jun 2023	M15 Cluj-Napoca, Romania	WTT	Clay	(Romania) Radu Mihai Papoe	2–6, 7–6^{(7–5)}, 4–6
Win	2–2	Aug 2023	M25 Southaven, US	WTT	Hard	(United States) Martin Damm Jr.	6–7^{(3–7)}, 6–1, 6–3
Loss	2–3	Jun 2024	M15 Alkmaar, Netherlands	WTT	Clay	(Netherlands) Deney Wassermann	6–7^{(8–10)}, 4–6
Win	3–3	Jul 2024	M25 Esch-sur-Alzette, Luxembourg	WTT	Clay	(Belgium) Gauthier Onclin	6–1, 3–6, 6–4
Win	4–3	Aug 2024	M15 Ystad, Sweden	WTT	Clay	(Germany) Louis Wessels	6–2, 4–6, 6–3
Win	5–3	Aug 2024	M25 Hong Kong, China SAR	WTT	Hard	Alexey Zakharov	7–5, 6–4
Win	6–3	Sep 2024	M15 Hong Kong, China SAR	WTT	Hard	(Northern Mariana Islands) Colin Sinclair	6–4, 7–6^{(7–3)}
Win	7–3	Oct 2024	M15 Monastir, Tunisia	WTT	Hard	(Belgium) Émilien Demanet	6–3, 6–4
Loss	7–4	Mar 2025	M25 Loulé, Portugal	WTT	Hard	(United Kingdom) Ryan Peniston	6–3, 1–6, 3–6

=== Doubles: 5 (4 titles, 1 runner-up) ===
Legend ITF WTT (4–1)	Finals by surface Hard (1–1) Clay (3–0)

Result	W–L	Date	Tournament	Tier	Surface	Partner	Opponents	Score
Win	1–0	Jun 2022	M15 Duffel, Belgium	WTT	Clay	(Luxembourg) Alex Knaff	(Argentina) Franco Emanuel Egea (Brazil) Marcelo Zormann	6–1, 6–4
Win	2–0	Jul 2022	M25 Esch-sur-Alzette, Luxembourg	WTT	Clay	(Luxembourg) Alex Knaff	(Luxembourg) Raphael Calzi (Germany) Marlon Vankan	6–1, 6–4
Win	3–0	Jul 2023	M25 Esch-sur-Alzette, Luxembourg	WTT	Clay	(Luxembourg) Alex Knaff	(Greece) Dimitris Sakellaridis (Greece) Stefanos Sakellaridis	6–3, 6–4
Win	4–0	Oct 2024	M15 Monastir, Tunisia	WTT	Hard	(United States) William Woodall	(France) Constantin Bittoun Kouzmine (France) Luc Fomba	6–2, 3–6, [10–3]
Loss	4–1	Oct 2024	M15 Monastir, Tunisia	WTT	Hard	(United States) William Woodall	(United Kingdom) Ewen Lumsden (France) Loris Pourroy	walkover
