= 2025 Oeiras Indoors =

- Date: 6 – 11 January
- Edition: 5th
- Category: ATP Challenger Tour 75
- Surface: Hard (indoor)
- Location: Oeiras, Portugal

Champions

Singles
- (Serbia) Hamad Medjedovic

Doubles
- (United States) George Goldhoff / (United States) Trey Hilderbrand
- Oeiras Indoors

The 2025 Oeiras Indoors was a professional tennis tournament played on hard courts. It was the 5th edition of the tournament which was part of the 2025 ATP Challenger Tour. It took place in Oeiras, Portugal from 6 to 11 January 2025.

== Singles main-draw entrants ==
=== Seeds ===
Country	Player	Rank^{1}	Seed
SRB	Hamad Medjedovic	114	1
SUI	Alexander Ritschard	118	2
KAZ	Beibit Zhukayev	243	3
KAZ	Denis Yevseyev	246	4
CAN	Liam Draxl	247	5
CHI	Matías Soto	248	6
HUN	Zsombor Piros	249	7
ESP	Pol Martín Tiffon	251	8

- ^{1} Rankings are as of 30 December 2024.

=== Other entrants ===
The following players received wildcards into the singles main draw:

- (Portugal) Pedro Araújo
- (Portugal) Frederico Ferreira Silva
- (Portugal) Duarte Vale

The following players received entry from the qualifying draw:

- (Lithuania) Ričardas Berankis
- (Germany) Sebastian Fanselow
- Ivan Gakhov
- Egor Gerasimov
- (United States) Trey Hilderbrand
- Alexey Zakharov

== Champions ==
=== Singles ===
- (Serbia) Hamad Medjedovic def. (Canada) Liam Draxl 6–1, 6–3.

=== Doubles ===
- (United States) George Goldhoff / (United States) Trey Hilderbrand def. (Japan) Kaichi Uchida / (Kazakhstan) Denis Yevseyev 7–5, 2–6, [10–5].
