= Cleeve Harper =

Canadian tennis player (born 2000)

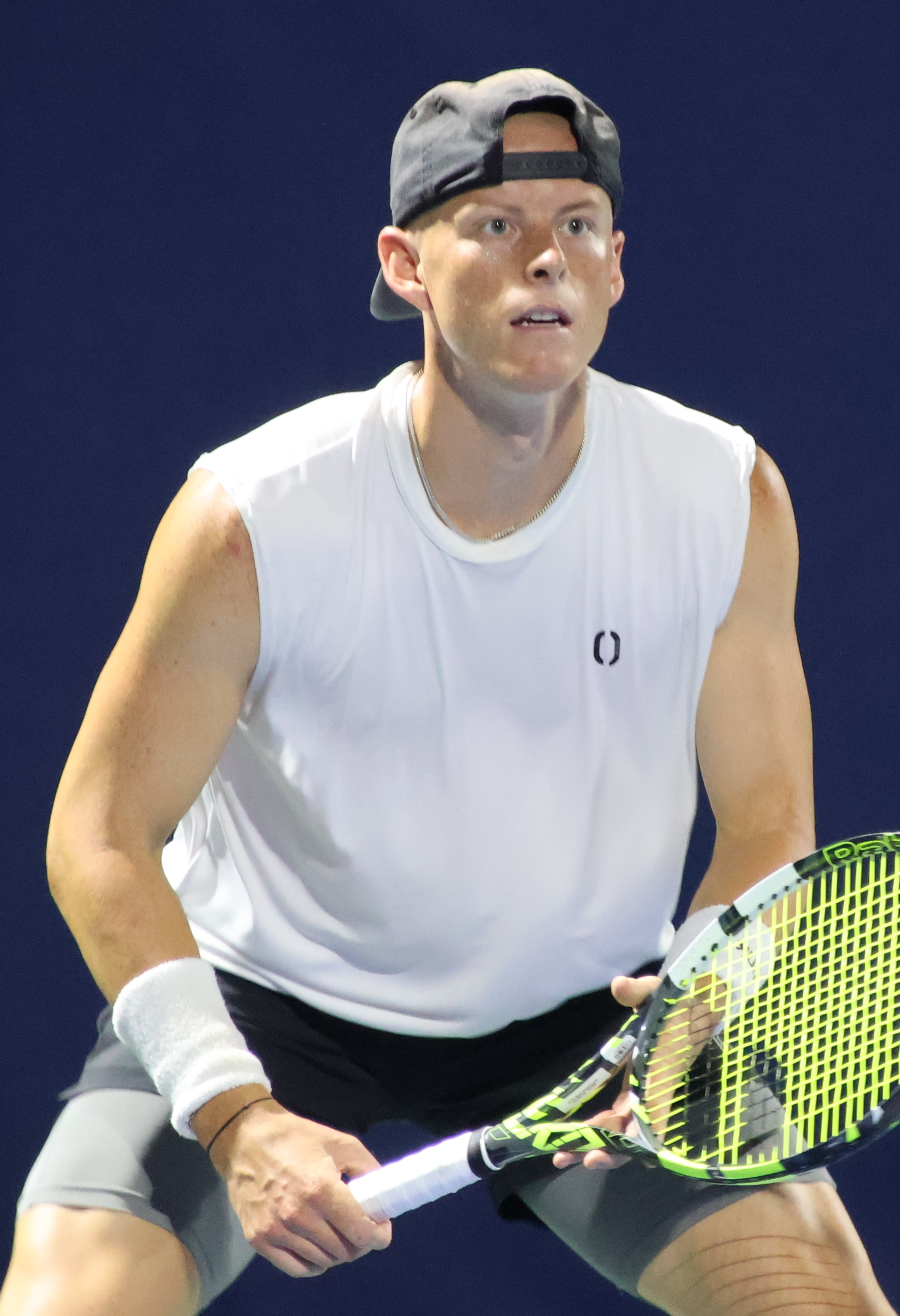
- Harper in 2026
- Country (sports): Canada
- Born: 24 December 2000 (age 25) Calgary, Alberta, Canada
- Height: 1.83 m (6 ft 0 in)
- Plays: Right-handed (two-handed backhand)
- College: University of Texas
- Prize money: $ 126,154

Singles
- Career record: 1–0 (at ATP Tour level, Grand Slam level, and in Davis Cup)
- Career titles: 0
- Highest ranking: No. 1017 (27 January 2025)
- Current ranking: No. 1355 (9 February 2026)

Doubles
- Career record: 3–7 (at ATP Tour level, Grand Slam level, and in Davis Cup)
- Career titles: 8 Challenger, 5 ITF
- Highest ranking: No. 83 (8 September 2025)
- Current ranking: No. 97 (16 March 2026)

Grand Slam doubles results
- French Open: 1R (2026)
- US Open: 2R (2025)
- Last updated on: 19 March 2026.

Cleeve Harper (born 24 December 2000) is a Canadian tennis player who specializes in doubles. He has a career-high ATP doubles ranking of world No. 83 achieved on 8 September 2025.

== Career ==
Harper made his ATP main draw debut at the 2022 National Bank Open after receiving a wildcard into the doubles main draw with Liam Draxl, but lost in straight sets to Simone Bolelli and Fabio Fognini.

In 2024, he won three Challenger titles with Draxl, starting in September at the 2024 Dobrich Challenger II, his last tournament being in Manzanillo, and reached a then career-high ranking of No. 159 on 2 December 2024.

In 2025, partnering David Stevenson, he won the doubles title at the 2025 Lugano Challenger, defeating Jakub Paul and David Pel in the final. Harper reached the top 100 in the doubles rankings on 21 April 2025, following his sixth Challenger title at the 2025 Tallahassee Tennis Challenger, partnering with Liam Draxl. In September, Harper made his Davis Cup debut winning both his doubles and singles match vs Israel.

Harper was named the 2025 Canadian Men's Doubles Player of the Year.

== College ==
Harper played collegiate tennis at the University of Texas at Austin. He was a 3-time All American and won the 2022 NCAA Division I Men's Doubles Championship with teammate Richard Ciamarra. and repeated as a finalist in 2023 with teammate Eliot Spizzirri. Following his graduation from university, Harper started full time on the professional tour in June 2024.

== ATP Challenger and ITF Tour finals ==
=== Doubles: 25 (14–11) ===
| Legend ATP Challenger Tour (9–5) ITF Futures/World Tennis Tour (5–6) | Finals by surface Hard (9–7) Clay (5–4) |

| Result | W–L | Date | Tournament | Tier | Surface | Partner | Opponents | Score |
|---|---|---|---|---|---|---|---|---|
| Win | 1–0 | Dec 2021 | M15 Cancun, Mexico | ITF | Hard | (Canada) Liam Draxl | (Brazil) Luís Britto (Brazil) Marcelo Zormann | 7–5, 7–6^{(7–4)} |
| Loss | 1–1 | Dec 2021 | M15 Cancun, Mexico | ITF | Hard | (Canada) Liam Draxl | (Germany) Tim Handel (Switzerland) Yannik Steinegger | 6–7^{(5–7)}, 3–6 |
| Win | 2–1 | Jul 2022 | M15 Pittsburgh, PA | ITF | Clay | (United States) Tyler Zink | (United States) Nico Mostardi (United States) Luke Phillips | 6–7^{(3–7)}, 7–6^{(7–5)}, [10–6] |
| Loss | 2–2 | Jun 2024 | M25 Wichita, KS | ITF | Hard | (United States) Eliot Spizzirri | (United States) Pranav Kumar (United States) Joshua Sheehy | 7–6^{(7–4)}, 3–6, [8–10] |
| Loss | 2–3 | Jun 2024 | M25 Tulsa, OK | ITF | Hard | (United States) Govind Nanda | (United States) Aidan Kim (United States) Cannon Kingsley | 3–6, 7–5, [7–10] |
| Loss | 2–4 | July 2024 | M25 Laval, Canada | ITF | Hard | (Canada) Liam Draxl | (United States) Alexander Bernard (United States) JJ Tracy | 6-3, 4-6, [5–10] |
| Win | 3–4 | July 2024 | M25 Champagne, IL | ITF | Hard | (United States) Tyler Zink | (United States) Cannon Kingsley (United States) Preston Stearns | 6-4, 6-4 |
| Win | 4–4 | Aug 2024 | M25 Santander, Spain | ITF | Clay | (Spain) Iñaki Montes de la Torre | (Italy) Raul Brancaccio (Spain) Sergi Perez Contri | 6-3, 6-4 |
| Win | 5–4 | Sep 2024 | Dobrich II, Bulgaria | Challenger | Clay | (Canada) Liam Draxl | (Italy) Francesco Maestrelli (Italy) Filippo Romano | 6–1, 3–6, [12–10] |
| Loss | 5–5 | Sep 2024 | Sibiu, Romania | Challenger | Clay | (Canada) Liam Draxl | (Peru) Alexander Merino (Germany) Christoph Negritu | 2–6, 6–7^{(2–7)} |
| Loss | 5–6 | Sep 2024 | M25 Sabadell, Spain | ITF | Clay | (Spain) Iñaki Montes de la Torre | (Netherlands) Ryan Nijboer (Switzerland) Johan Nikles | 4-6, 2-6 |
| Win | 6–6 | Oct 2024 | M25 Edmonton, Canada | World Tennis Tour | Hard | (Canada) Liam Draxl | (Canada) Benjamin Thomas George (Canada) Alvin Nicholas Tudorica | 6–4, 6–4 |
| Win | 7–6 | Oct 2024 | Sioux Falls, USA | Challenger | Hard (i) | (Canada) Liam Draxl | (United States) Ryan Seggerman (United States) Patrik Trhac | 7–5, 6–3 |
| Loss | 7–7 | Nov 2024 | Drummondville, Canada | Challenger | Hard (i) | (Canada) Liam Draxl | (United States) Robert Cash (United States) JJ Tracy | 2-6, 4–6 |
| Loss | 7–8 | Nov 2024 | M25 Austin, USA | World Tennis Tour | Hard | (Australia) Patrick Harper | (Belgium) Pierre Yves Bailly (United States) Stefan Dostanic | 5-7, 3–6 |
| Win | 8–8 | Dec 2024 | Manzanillo, Mexico | Challenger | Hard | (Canada) Liam Draxl | (New Zealand) Finn Reynolds (Canada) Benjamin Sigouin | 6–7^{(4–7)}, 7–5, [12–10] |
| Win | 9–8 | Jan 2025 | Oeiras III, Portugal | Challenger | Hard | (Canada) Liam Draxl | (Netherlands) Matwé Middelkoop (Ukraine) Denys Molchanov | 1–6, 7–5, [10–6] |
| Win | 10–8 | Mar 2025 | Lugano, Switzerland | Challenger | Hard | (United Kingdom) David Stevenson | (Switzerland) Jakub Paul (Netherlands) David Pel | 4–6, 6–3, [10–8] |
| Win | 11–8 | Apr 2025 | Tallahassee, USA | Challenger | Clay (green) | (Canada) Liam Draxl | (United States) James Cerretani (United States) George Goldhoff | 6–2, 6–3 |
| Loss | 11-9 | July 2025 | Iași, Romania | Challenger | Clay | (United States) Ryan Seggerman | (Poland) Szymon Kielan (Poland) Filip Pieczonka | 5–7, 3–6 |
| Win | 12–9 | Jan 2026 | Oeiras, Portugal | Challenger | Hard (i) | (United Kingdom) David Stevenson | (Portugal) Francisco Rocha (Portugal) Tiago Torres | 6–3, 3–6, [12–10] |
| Win | 13–9 | Mar 2026 | Cherbourg, France | Challenger | Hard (i) | (United Kingdom) David Stevenson | (Poland) Karol Drzewiecki (Poland) Szymon Walków | 4–6, 6–3, [10–8] |
| Loss | 13-10 | Apr 2026 | Tallahassee, USA | Challenger | Clay | (United Kingdom) David Stevenson | (United States) Stefan Dostanic (United States) Alex Rybakov | 4–6, 2–6 |
| Win | 14–10 | Apr 2026 | Savannah, USA | Challenger | Clay | (United Kingdom) David Stevenson | (Venezuela) Luis David Martínez (Colombia) Cristian Rodríguez | 7–6^{(7–4)}, 6–2 |
| Loss | 14–11 | Jul 2026 | Lincoln, USA | Challenger | Hard | (United States) George Goldhoff | (United States) Nathaniel Lammons (United States) Jackson Withrow | 3–6, 3–6 |
