= David Stevenson (tennis) =

British tennis player (born 1999)

- Country (sports): United Kingdom
- Born: 1 January 1999 (age 27) Hertfordshire, United Kingdom
- Height: 1.96 m (6 ft 5 in)
- Plays: Right-handed (two-handed backhand)
- College: Memphis
- Prize money: US $181,928

Singles
- Career record: 0–0

Doubles
- Career record: 7–13
- Career titles: 8 ATP Challenger
- Highest ranking: No. 73 (9 November 2026)
- Current ranking: No. 73 (9 November 2026)

Grand Slam doubles results
- Wimbledon: 2R (2026)
- US Open: 1R (2026)

Grand Slam mixed doubles results
- Wimbledon: 2R (2025)
- Last updated on: 9 November 2026.

David Stevenson (born 1 January 1999) is a British tennis player who specializes in doubles. He has a career high ATP doubles ranking of world No. 73 achieved on 9 November 2026. Stevenson played college tennis at Memphis.

== Career ==
=== 2024-2025: ATP Challenger titles ===
Stevenson won the 2024 Kozerki Open with Charles Broom, the 2024 Taipei OEC Open with Marcus Willis, and the 2025 Challenger Città di Lugano with Cleeve Harper.

=== 2026: First ATP final ===
Partnering Marcus Willis, he reached his first ATP Tour final at the 2026 Croatia Open Umag, losing to top seeds Adam Pavlásek and Patrik Rikl in a deciding champions tiebreak.

== ATP Tour finals ==
=== Doubles: 1 (1 runner-up) ===
| Legend Grand Slam (0–0) ATP 1000 (0–0) ATP 500 (0–0) ATP 250 (0–1) | Finals by surface Hard (0–0) Clay (0–1) Grass (0–0) |

| Result | W–L | Date | Tournament | Tier | Surface | Partner | Opponents | Score |
|---|---|---|---|---|---|---|---|---|
| Loss | 0–1 | Jul 2026 | Croatia Open, Croatia | ATP 250 | Clay | (United Kingdom) Marcus Willis | (Czech Republic) Adam Pavlásek (Czech Republic) Patrik Rikl | 3–6, 6–4, [6–10] |

== ATP Challenger and ITF Tour finals ==
=== Doubles: 23 (13–10) ===
| Legend ATP Challenger (8–7) ITF World Tennis Tour (5–3) | Finals by surface Hard (10–4) Clay (1–6) Grass (1–0) Carpet (1–0) |

| Result | W–L | Date | Tournament | Tier | Surface | Partner | Opponents | Score |
|---|---|---|---|---|---|---|---|---|
| Loss | 0–1 | Oct 2023 | M25 Edgbaston, United Kingdom | WTT | Hard | (United Kingdom) Charles Broom | (United Kingdom) Jacob Fearnley (United Kingdom) Connor Thomson | 6–7^{(2–7)}, 7–6^{(7–5)}, [7–10] |
| Win | 1–1 | Nov 2023 | M25 Sunderland, United Kingdom | WTT | Hard (i) | (United Kingdom) Marcus Willis | (United Kingdom) James Davis (United Kingdom) Joshua Goodger | 6–4, 7–6^{(7–3)} |
| Win | 2–1 | Dec 2023 | M15 Sharm El Sheikh, Egypt | WTT | Hard | (United Kingdom) Ben Jones | (Kazakhstan) Grigoriy Lomakin; Evgeny Philippov | 7–6^{(7–5)}, 7–6^{(7–2)} |
| Win | 3–1 | Jan 2024 | M25 Sunderland, United Kingdom | WTT | Hard (i) | (United Kingdom) Marcus Willis | (France) Dan Added (France) Clément Chidekh | 4–6, 7–6^{(8–6)}, [10–8] |
| Win | 4–1 | Feb 2024 | M15 Veigy-Foncenex, France | WTT | Carpet (i) | (United Kingdom) James Davis | (France) Adan Freire da Silva (France) Yanis Ghazouani Durand | 6–3, 7–6^{(7–5)} |
| Win | 5–1 | Feb 2024 | M15 Sharm El Sheikh, Egypt | WTT | Hard | (United Kingdom) Emile Hudd | (Czech Republic) Marek Gengel (United Kingdom) Mark Whitehouse | 6–2, 6–4 |
| Loss | 5–2 | Feb 2024 | M15 Sharm El Sheikh, Egypt | WTT | Hard | (United Kingdom) Emile Hudd | (Czech Republic) Jan Hrazdil (Japan) Rei Sakamoto | 3–6, 7–6^{(10–8)}, [9–11] |
| Loss | 5–3 | Mar 2024 | M25 Santo Domingo, Dominican Republic | WTT | Hard | (United Kingdom) Charles Broom | (Colombia) Nicolás Mejía (Colombia) Andrés Urrea | 6–7^{(2–7)}, 6–3, [7–10] |
| Loss | 5–4 | Apr 2024 | San Miguel de Tucuman, Argentina | Challenger | Clay | (Australia) Patrick Harper | (Brazil) Luís Britto (Argentina) Gonzalo Villanueva | 3–6, 2–6 |
| Loss | 5–5 | Apr 2024 | Concepción, Chile | Challenger | Clay | (Australia) Patrick Harper | (Japan) Seita Watanabe (Japan) Takeru Yuzuki | 1–6, 6–7^{(6–8)} |
| Loss | 5–6 | Apr 2024 | Porto Alegre, Brazil | Challenger | Clay | (Australia) Patrick Harper | (Dominican Republic) Roberto Cid Subervi (Japan) Kaichi Uchida | 7–5, 6–7^{(1–7)}, [6–10] |
| Loss | 5–7 | Jul 2024 | Amersfoort, Netherlands | Challenger | Clay | (United Kingdom) Jay Clarke | (Brazil) Marcelo Demoliner (Argentina) Guillermo Durán | 6–7^{(2–7)}, 4–6 |
| Win | 6–7 | Aug 2024 | Grodzisk Mazowiecki, Poland | Challenger | Hard | (United Kingdom) Charles Broom | (Israel) Daniel Cukierman (Denmark) Johannes Ingildsen | 6–3, 7–6^{(7–3)} |
| Win | 7–7 | Oct 2024 | Taipei, Taiwan | Challenger | Hard (i) | (United Kingdom) Marcus Willis | (South Korea) Nam Ji-sung (United Kingdom) Joshua Paris | 6–3, 6–3 |
| Win | 8–7 | Mar 2025 | Lugano, Switzerland | Challenger | Hard | (Canada) Cleeve Harper | (Switzerland) Jakub Paul (Netherlands) David Pel | 4–6, 6–3, [10–8] |
| Loss | 8–8 | May 2025 | Mauthausen, Austria | Challenger | Clay | (United States) Ryan Seggerman | (Austria) Nico Hipfl (Switzerland) Jérôme Kym | 5–7, 6–3, [2–10] |
| Win | 9–8 | Jan 2026 | Nottingham, United Kingdom | Challenger | Hard (i) | (United Kingdom) Charles Broom | (Slovakia) Miloš Karol (Germany) Daniel Masur | 6–2, 7–6^{(7–5)} |
| Win | 10–8 | Jan 2026 | Oeiras, Portugal | Challenger | Hard (i) | (Canada) Cleeve Harper | (Portugal) Francisco Rocha (Portugal) Tiago Torres | 6–3, 3–6, [12–10] |
| Win | 11–8 | Mar 2026 | Cherbourg, France | Challenger | Hard (i) | (Canada) Cleeve Harper | (Poland) Karol Drzewiecki (Poland) Szymon Walków | 4–6, 6–3, [10–8] |
| Loss | 11–9 | Apr 2026 | Tallahassee, United States | Challenger | Clay | (Canada) Cleeve Harper | (United States) Stefan Dostanic (United States) Alex Rybakov | 4–6, 2–6 |
| Win | 12–9 | Apr 2026 | Savannah, United States | Challenger | Clay | (Canada) Cleeve Harper | (Venezuela) Luis David Martínez (Colombia) Cristian Rodríguez | 7–6^{(7–4)}, 6–2 |
| Win | 13–9 | Jun 2026 | Ilkley, United Kingdom | Challenger | Grass | (United Kingdom) Marcus Willis | (India) Rithvik Choudary Bollipalli (United States) Trey Hilderbrand | 7–6^{(7–5)}, 6–3 |
| Loss | 13–10 | Oct 2026 | Roanne, France | Challenger | Hard (i) | (United Kingdom) Marcus Willis | (Monaco) Romain Arneodo (Germany) Hendrik Jebens | 4–6, 4–6 |
