= Tiago Torres =

Portuguese tennis player (born 2002)

- Country (sports): Portugal
- Born: 8 July 2002 (age 24) Lisbon, Portugal
- Height: 1.75 m (5 ft 9 in)
- Plays: Left-handed (two-handed backhand)
- College: UTSA
- Coach: Vasco Martins, Danyal Sualehe, Joao Zanatti
- Prize money: US $72,743

Singles
- Career record: 2–1 (at ATP Tour level, Grand Slam level, and in Davis Cup)
- Career titles: 0
- Highest ranking: No. 332 (27 July 2026)
- Current ranking: No. 332 (27 July 2026)

Doubles
- Career record: 1–1 (at ATP Tour level, Grand Slam level, and in Davis Cup)
- Career titles: 1 Challenger, 2 ITF
- Highest ranking: No. 319 (27 July 2026)
- Current ranking: No. 319 (27 July 2026)
- Last updated on: 27 July 2026.

Tiago Torres (born 8 July 2002) is a Portuguese tennis player. Torres has a career high ATP singles ranking of No. 332 and a career high ATP doubles ranking of No. 319, both achieved on 27 July 2026.

Torres played college tennis at UTSA.

Torres made his ATP main draw debut at the 2026 Estoril Open after receiving a wildcard for the singles main draw, where he beat former top-20 Nikoloz Basilashvili for this maiden ATP win.

== ATP Challenger and ITF World Tennis Tour finals ==
=== Singles: 3 (1 title, 2 runner-ups) ===
Legend (singles) ATP Challenger Tour (0–0) ITF World Tennis Tour (0–5)	Finals by surface Hard (0–4) Clay (0–0) Grass (0–0)

Result	W–L	Date	Tournament	Tier	Surface	Opponent	Score
Loss	0–1	Oct 2025	M15 Pontevedra, Spain	World Tennis Tour	Hard	(Spain) Alejandro Turriziani Álvarez	5–7, 5–7
Loss	0-2	Mar 2025	M15 Monastir, Tunisia	World Tennis Tour	Hard	(Turkey) Mert Alkaya	4–6, 4–6
Loss	0-3	Apr 2025	M15 Sanxenxo, Spain	World Tennis Tour	Hard	(United Kingdom) Henry Searle	4–6, 2–6
Loss	0-4	Jun 2025	M25 Lourinhã, Portugal	World Tennis Tour	Hard	(Netherlands) Thijs Boogaard	5–7, 6–2, 5–7

=== Doubles: 2 (2–4) ===
Legend (singles) ATP Challenger Tour (0–1) ITF World Tennis Tour (2–3)	Finals by surface Hard (1–4) Clay (1–0) Grass (0–0)

Result	W–L	Date	Tournament	Tier	Surface	Partner	Opponents	Score
Loss	0–1	Oct 2025	M25 Sintra, Portugal	WTT	Hard	(Portugal) João Graça	(Portugal) Pedro Araújo (Spain) Rafael Izquierdo Luque	0–7, 6–7(4–7)
Win	1–1	Oct 2025	M25 Sintra, Portugal	WTT	Hard	(Portugal) João Graça	(Spain) Rafael Izquierdo Luque; Pavel Lagutin	Walkover
Loss	1–2	Nov 2025	M25 Vale do Lobo, Portugal	WTT	Hard	(Portugal) João Graça	(Portugal) Pedro Araújo (Portugal) Diogo Marques	7–5, 2–6, [10–12]
Win	2–2	Dec 2025	M15 Madrid, Spain	WTT	Clay	(Spain) John Echeverria	(Spain) Ignasi Forcano (Spain) Benjamín Winter López	4–6, 7–6(7–4), [10–8]
Loss	2–3	Jan 2026	Oeiras Indoors, Portugal	Challenger	Hard (i)	(Portugal) Francisco Rocha	(Canada) Cleeve Harper (United Kingdom) David Stevenson	3–6, 6–3, [10–12]
Loss	2–4	Apr 2026	M25 Quinta do Lago, Portugal	WTT	Hard	(Spain) John Echeverría	(Australia) Thomas Fancutt (New Zealand) Ajeet Rai	3–6, 6–7(2–7)
