= Maks Kaśnikowski =

Polish tennis player (born 2003)

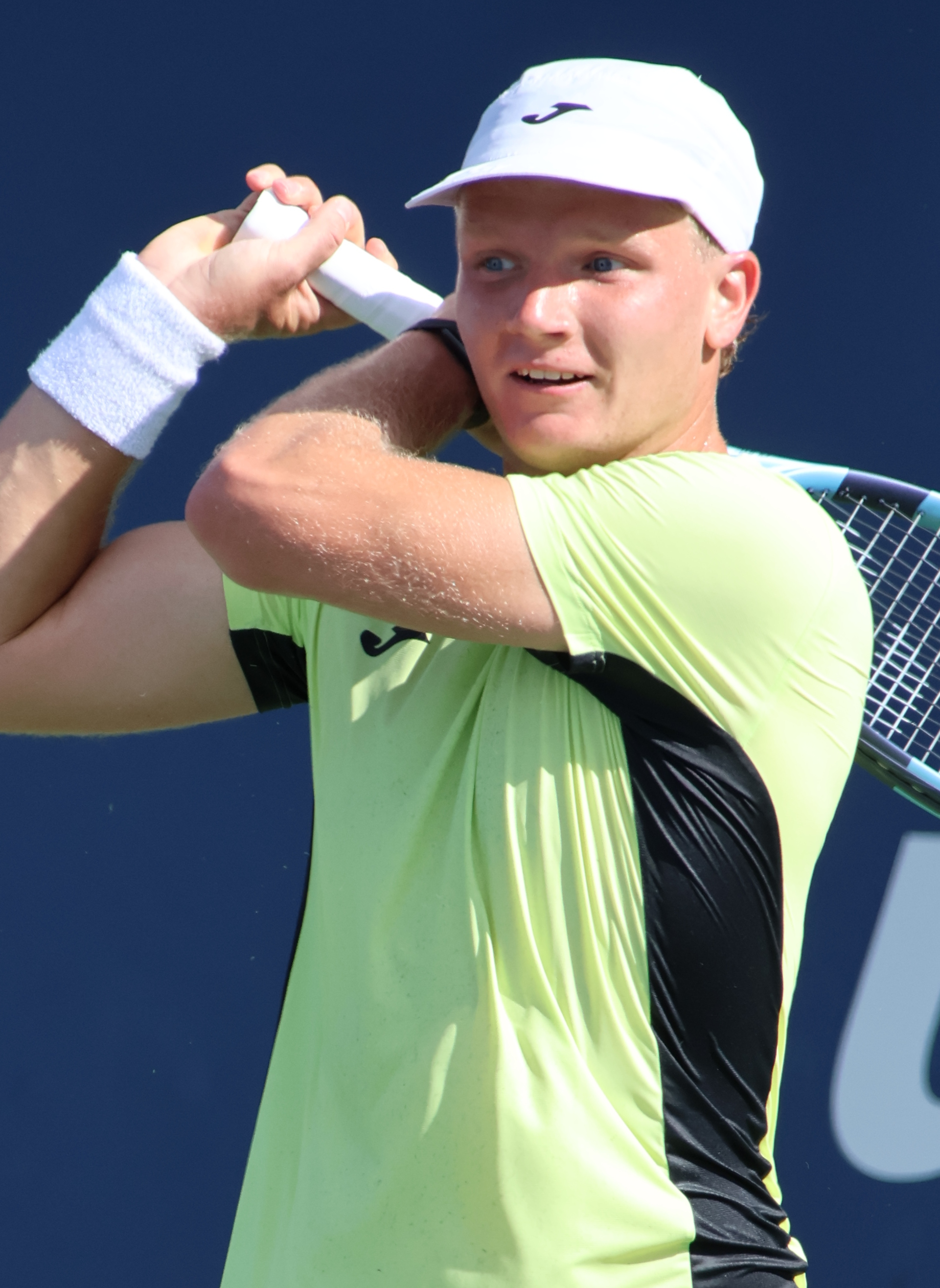
- Kaśnikowski at the 2026 US Open
- Country (sports): Poland
- Born: 6 July 2003 (age 23) Warsaw, Poland
- Height: 1.82 m (6 ft 0 in)
- Plays: Right-handed (two-handed backhand)
- Prize money: US $305,804

Singles
- Career record: 4–3 (at ATP Tour level, Grand Slam level, and in Davis Cup)
- Career titles: 0
- Highest ranking: No. 168 (21 October 2024)
- Current ranking: No. 331 (6 April 2026)

Grand Slam singles results
- Australian Open: Q2 (2025)
- US Open: 1R (2024)

Doubles
- Career record: 0–0 (at ATP Tour level, Grand Slam level, and in Davis Cup)
- Career titles: 0
- Highest ranking: No. 688 (8 May 2023)
- Last updated on: 6 April 2026.

Maks Kaśnikowski (born 6 July 2003) is a Polish professional tennis player. He has a career-high ATP singles ranking of world No. 168, achieved on 21 October 2024 and a doubles ranking of No. 688, reached on 8 May 2023. He is currently the No. 3 Polish player in men's singles.

Kaśnikowski represents Poland at the Davis Cup, where he has a W/L record of 4–2.

== Career ==
=== 2023: First Challenger final ===
In October, he reached his first Challenger final in Ortisei, Italy and moved into a new career high in the top 290 in the rankings, that he first reached on 3 July 2023.

=== 2024: Maiden Challenger title, Grand Slam debut ===
At the 2024 Oeiras Indoors, he reached his second Challenger final, saving six match points in the opening round against Adrian Andreev, and then defeating two Portuguese players, wildcard João Domingues, second seed João Sousa and Valentin Royer. He won his first Challenger title with a win over another Portuguese Gastão Elias, becoming the second-youngest Polish champion in history to win a title. Only a 19-year-old Jerzy Janowicz was younger when he won his title in St. Remy, France in 2010.

In June, he won his second Challenger title at home, at the 2024 Poznań Open. He became the third Polish champion in the history of the tournament, joining Jerzy Janowicz (2012) and Hubert Hurkacz (2018).

Ranked No. 193, he made his Grand Slam debut, after qualifying for the main draw at the US Open but lost to Pedro Martínez.

== ATP Challenger Tour finals ==
=== Singles: 3 (2 titles, 1 runner-up) ===
Legend ATP Challenger Tour (2–1)

Result	W–L	Date	Tournament	Tier	Surface	Opponent	Score
Loss	0–1	Oct 2023	Sparkasse Challenger, Italy	Challenger	Hard (i)	(Slovakia) Lukáš Klein	7–6^{(7–4)}, 6–7^{(4–7)}, 6–7^{(6–8)}
Win	1–1	Jan 2024	Oeiras Indoors, Portugal	Challenger	Hard (i)	(Portugal) Gastão Elias	7–6^{(7–1)}, 4–6, 6–3
Win	2–1	Jun 2024	Poznań Open, Poland	Challenger	Clay	(Argentina) Camilo Ugo Carabelli	3–6, 6–4, 6–3

== ITF World Tennis Tour finals ==
=== Singles: 11 (7 titles, 4 runner-ups) ===
Legend ITF WTT (7–4)	Finals by surface Hard (2–2) Clay (5–2)

Result	W–L	Date	Tournament	Tier	Surface	Opponent	Score
Win	1–0	Jun 2022	M15 Wrocław, Poland	WTT	Clay	(Czech Republic) Petr Nouza	6–4, 3–6, 6–4
Loss	1–1	Jul 2022	M15 Łódź, Poland	WTT	Clay	(Poland) Paweł Ciaś	4–6, 6–7^{(4–7)}
Loss	1–2	Aug 2022	M15 Pärnu, Estonia	WTT	Clay	(Argentina) Fermín Tenti	5–7, 6–3, 5–7
Loss	1–3	Oct 2022	M15 Sozopol, Bulgaria	WTT	Hard	(Romania) Sebastian Gima	5–7, 2–6
Loss	1–4	Oct 2022	M15 Sozopol, Bulgaria	WTT	Hard	(Bulgaria) Alexandar Lazarov	2–6, 4–6
Win	2–4	Feb 2023	M15 Monastir, Tunisia	WTT	Hard	(Monaco) Lucas Catarina	6–4, 6–0
Win	3–4	Apr 2023	M15 Kuršumlijska Banja, Serbia	WTT	Clay	(Croatia) Duje Ajduković	6–4, 7–6^{(7–3)}
Win	4–4	May 2024	M25 Kiseljak, Bosnia and Herzegovina	WTT	Clay	(United Kingdom) Jay Clarke	6–2, 6–2
Win	5–4	Jul 2025	M25 Koszalin, Poland	WTT	Clay	(Poland) Tomasz Berkieta	6–1, 4–6, 6–4
Win	6–4	Nov 2025	M25 Montreal, Canada	WTT	Hard (i)	(Morocco) Taha Baadi	7–6^{(7–3)}, 6–1
Win	7–4	May 2026	M25 Bol, Croatia	WTT	Clay	(Croatia) Noa Vukadin	6–1, 6–3

=== Doubles: 3 (1 title, 2 runner-ups) ===
Legend ITF WTT (1–2)

Result	W–L	Date	Tournament	Tier	Surface	Partner	Opponents	Score
Loss	0–1	May 2022	M15 Antalya, Turkey	WTT	Clay	(Switzerland) Jérôme Kym	(United States) Bruno Kuzuhara (United States) Victor Lilov	walkover
Win	1–1	Oct 2022	M15 Sozopol, Bulgaria	WTT	Hard	(Poland) Olaf Pieczkowski	(Bulgaria) Yanaki Milev (Bulgaria) Petr Nesterov	6–3, 7–5
Loss	1–2	Apr 2023	M25 Split, Croatia	WTT	Clay	(Switzerland) Jérôme Kym	(Poland) Piotr Matuszewski (Ukraine) Oleg Prihodko	2–6, 6–7^{(6–8)}
