= Oeiras Indoors =

- 2026 Oeiras Indoors

Tournament information
- Event name: Indoor Oeiras Open (ATP); Oeiras Jamor Indoor (WTA)
- Location: Oeiras, Portugal
- Venue: Centro Desportivo Nacional do Jamor
- Category: ATP Challenger Tour; WTA 125
- Surface: Hard (i)
- Website: Website

Current champions (ATP 2026, WTA 2026)
- Men's singles: (Luxembourg) Chris Rodesch
- Women's singles: (Ukraine) Daria Snigur
- Men's doubles: (Czech Republic) Filip Duda (Czech Republic) Zdeněk Kolář
- Women's doubles: (Slovakia) Viktória Hrunčáková (Czech Republic) Gabriela Knutson
ATP Tour
- Category: ATP Challenger Tour
- Draw: 32S / 24Q / 16D
- Prize money: €160,680
WTA Tour
- Category: WTA 125
- Draw: 32S / 16Q / 16D
- Prize money: €100,000

The Oeiras Indoor is a professional tennis tournament played on hardcourts. It is currently part of the ATP Challenger and the WTA 125 Challenger Tours. The tournament has been held in Oeiras, Portugal since 2023 and was staged as men's only event in two separate editions in 2023 and 2024. Three separate editions were held in 2025, and two separate men's editions in 2026, when the women's event also started at the same venue with two editions of their own.

== Past finals ==
=== Men's singles ===
Year	Champion	Runner-up	Score
2026 (2)	(Luxembourg) Chris Rodesch (2)	(Estonia) Daniil Glinka	6–3, 7–5
2026 (1)	(Luxembourg) Chris Rodesch	(Hungary) Zsombor Piros	6–4, 4–6, 6–2
2025 (3)	(Belgium) Alexander Blockx	(Canada) Liam Draxl	7–5, 6–1
2025 (2)	(United States) Aleksandar Kovacevic	(Hungary) Zsombor Piros	6–4, 7–6^{(7–4)}
2025 (1)	(Serbia) Hamad Medjedovic	(Canada) Liam Draxl	6–1, 6–3
2024 (2)	(Switzerland) Leandro Riedi	(United States) Martin Damm	7–6^{(8–6)}, 6–2
2024 (1)	(Poland) Maks Kaśnikowski	(Portugal) Gastão Elias	7–6^{(7–1)}, 4–6, 6–3
2023 (2)	(France) Arthur Fils	(Belgium) Joris De Loore	6–1, 7–6^{(7–4)}
2023 (1)	(Belgium) Joris De Loore	(Romania) Filip Cristian Jianu	6–3, 6–2

=== Women's singles ===
Year	Champion	Runner-up	Score
2026 (2)	(Ukraine) Daria Snigur	(Switzerland) Viktorija Golubic	6–3, 6–3
2026 (1)	Alina Korneeva	(Czech Republic) Darja Vidmanova	7–5, 6–1

=== Men's doubles ===
Year	Champions	Runners-up	Score
2026 (2)	(Czech Republic) Filip Duda (Czech Republic) Zdeněk Kolář	(Sweden) Erik Grevelius (Sweden) Adam Heinonen	6–3, 6–4
2026 (1)	(Canada) Cleeve Harper (2) (United Kingdom) David Stevenson	(Portugal) Francisco Rocha (Portugal) Tiago Torres	6–3, 3–6, [12–10]
2025 (3)	(Canada) Liam Draxl (Canada) Cleeve Harper	(Netherlands) Matwé Middelkoop (Ukraine) Denys Molchanov	1–6, 7–5, [10–6]
2025 (2)	(Croatia) Mili Poljičak (Serbia) Matej Sabanov	(Spain) Íñigo Cervantes (Netherlands) Mick Veldheer	6–0, 6–1
2025 (1)	(United States) George Goldhoff (United States) Trey Hilderbrand	(Japan) Kaichi Uchida (Kazakhstan) Denis Yevseyev	7–5, 2–6, [10–5]
2024 (2)	(Poland) Karol Drzewiecki (Poland) Piotr Matuszewski	(India) Arjun Kadhe (United Kingdom) Marcus Willis	6–3, 6–4
2024 (1)	(United Kingdom) Jay Clarke (United Kingdom) Marcus Willis	(France) Théo Arribagé (Belgium) Michael Geerts	6–4, 6–7^{(9–11)}, [10–3]
2023 (2)	(Netherlands) Sander Arends (Netherlands) David Pel	(Finland) Patrik Niklas-Salminen (Netherlands) Bart Stevens	6–3, 7–6^{(7–3)}
2023 (1)	(Romania) Victor Vlad Cornea (Czech Republic) Petr Nouza	(France) Jonathan Eysseric (France) Pierre-Hugues Herbert	6–3, 7–6^{(7–3)}

=== Women's doubles ===
Year	Champions	Runners-up	Score
2026 (2)	(Slovakia) Viktória Hrunčáková (Czech Republic) Gabriela Knutson	(United States) Carmen Corley (United States) Ivana Corley	7–6^{(9–7)}, 6–3
2026 (1)	(United States) Carmen Corley (United States) Ivana Corley	(United Kingdom) Emily Appleton (Japan) Makoto Ninomiya	2–6, 6–0, [10–4]
