= 2024 Modena Challenger – Doubles =

Doubles
- 2024 Modena Challenger

Final
- Champions: (France) Jonathan Eysseric (United States) George Goldhoff
- Runners-up: (Germany) Andre Begemann (Finland) Patrik Niklas-Salminen
- Score: 6–3, 3–6, [10–8]

Events
Singles	Doubles
- Modena Challenger

William Blumberg and Luis David Martínez were the defending champions but only Martínez chose to defend his title, partnering Oriol Roca Batalla. They lost in the first round to Andre Begemann and Patrik Niklas-Salminen.

Jonathan Eysseric and George Goldhoff won the title after defeating Begemann and Niklas-Salminen 6–3, 3–6, [10–8] in the final.

== Seeds ==
1. (Italy) Marco Bortolotti / (Australia) Matthew Romios (semifinals)
2. (Germany) Andre Begemann / (Finland) Patrik Niklas-Salminen (final)
3. (Sweden) Filip Bergevi / (Netherlands) Mick Veldheer (quarterfinals)
4. (France) Jonathan Eysseric / (United States) George Goldhoff (champions)

== Draw ==
Key

- Q = Qualifier
- WC = Wild card
- LL = Lucky loser
- Alt = Alternate
- ITF = ITF entry
- PR = Protected ranking
- SR = Special ranking
- SE = Special exempt
- JE = Junior exempt
- JR = Junior Accelerator Programme entrant
- CO = College Accelerator Programme entrant
- NG = Next Gen Accelerator Program entrant
- w/o = Walkover
- r = Retired
- d = Defaulted

=== Draw ===
First round
1	(Italy) M Bortolotti (Australia) MC Romios	6	6
WC	(Italy) Luca Parenti (Italy) Leonardo Taddia	1	2
WC	(Italy) R Brancaccio (Italy) G Piraino	6	2	[6]
PR	(Australia) B Bayldon (Netherlands) M Hermans	2	6	[10]
4	(France) J Eysseric (United States) G Goldhoff	7^{14}	6
(Australia) T Fancutt (New Zealand) R Statham	6^{12}	3
(Italy) G Oradini (Italy) A Pellegrino	w/o
(Argentina) A Collarini (Argentina) FA Gómez
(Greece) M Kalovelonis (Spain) D Vega Hernández	5	3
(Italy) F Romano (Italy) Augusto Virgili	7	6
(Italy) F Forti (Italy) Marcello Serafini	1	6	[3]
3	(Sweden) F Bergevi (Netherlands) M Veldheer	6	3	[10]
(Serbia) I Sabanov (Serbia) M Sabanov	6	6
(Italy) A Giannessi (Switzerland) L Margaroli	3	2
(Venezuela) LD Martínez (Spain) O Roca Batalla	6^{8}	6^{5}
2	(Germany) A Begemann (Finland) P Niklas-Salminen	7^{10}	7^{7}

Quarterfinals
1	(Italy) M Bortolotti (Australia) MC Romios	7^{7}	6
PR	(Australia) B Bayldon (Netherlands) M Hermans	6^{4}	2
4	(France) J Eysseric (United States) G Goldhoff	4	6	[10]
(Italy) G Oradini (Italy) A Pellegrino	6	1	[5]
(Italy) F Romano (Italy) A Virgili	3	7^{7}	[10]
3	(Sweden) F Bergevi (Netherlands) M Veldheer	6	6^{5}	[5]
(Serbia) I Sabanov (Serbia) M Sabanov
2	(Germany) A Begemann (Finland) P Niklas-Salminen	w/o

Semifinals
1	(Italy) M Bortolotti (Australia) MC Romios	3	2
4	(France) J Eysseric (United States) G Goldhoff	6	6
(Italy) F Romano (Italy) A Virgili	6	4	[4]
2	(Germany) A Begemann (Finland) P Niklas-Salminen	4	6	[10]

Final
4	(France) J Eysseric (United States) G Goldhoff	6	3	[10]
2	(Germany) A Begemann (Finland) P Niklas-Salminen	3	6	[8]
