= 2023 Modena Challenger =

- Date: 26 June – 1 July
- Edition: 1st
- Surface: Clay
- Location: Modena, Italy

Champions

Singles
- (United States) Emilio Nava

Doubles
- (United States) William Blumberg / (Venezuela) Luis David Martínez
Modena Challenger	· 2024 →

The 2023 Modena Challenger was a professional tennis tournament played on clay courts. It was the first edition of the tournament which was part of the 2023 ATP Challenger Tour. It took place in Modena, Italy between 26 June and 1 July 2023.

== Singles main-draw entrants ==
=== Seeds ===
Country	Player	Rank^{1}	Seed
ARG	Federico Coria	90	1
BRA	Thiago Monteiro	95	2
USA	Emilio Nava	210	3
CZE	Jakub Menšík	217	4
FRA	Térence Atmane	238	5
ARG	Renzo Olivo	239	6
BIH	Nerman Fatić	247	7
ITA	Gianluca Mager	250	8

- ^{1} Rankings are as of 19 June 2023.

=== Other entrants ===
The following players received wildcards into the singles main draw:

- (Argentina) Federico Coria
- (Italy) Gianmarco Ferrari
- (Italy) Marcello Serafini

The following players received entry into the singles main draw as alternates:

- (Bolivia) Murkel Dellien
- (Tunisia) Moez Echargui
- (Romania) Filip Cristian Jianu

The following players received entry from the qualifying draw:

- (Switzerland) Rémy Bertola
- (Italy) Francesco Forti
- (Germany) Lucas Gerch
- Alibek Kachmazov
- (Poland) Maks Kaśnikowski
- (Italy) Julian Ocleppo

== Champions ==
=== Singles ===
- (United States) Emilio Nava def. (France) Titouan Droguet 6–7^{(5–7)}, 7–6^{(8–6)}, 6–4.

=== Doubles ===
- (United States) William Blumberg / (Venezuela) Luis David Martínez def. (Czech Republic) Roman Jebavý / (Ukraine) Vladyslav Manafov 6–4, 6–4.
