= 2025 Modena Challenger – Doubles =

Doubles
- 2025 Modena Challenger

Final
- Champions: (Argentina) Federico Agustín Gómez (Venezuela) Luis David Martínez
- Runners-up: (Denmark) Johannes Ingildsen (Slovakia) Miloš Karol
- Score: 7–5, 7–6^{(7–5)}

Events
Singles	Doubles
- Modena Challenger

Jonathan Eysseric and George Goldhoff were the defending champions but chose not to defend their title.

Federico Agustín Gómez and Luis David Martínez won the title after defeating Johannes Ingildsen and Miloš Karol 7–5, 7–6^{(7–5)} in the final.

== Seeds ==
1. (Switzerland) Jakub Paul / (Brazil) Marcelo Zormann (quarterfinals)
2. (Australia) Blake Bayldon / (Ecuador) Gonzalo Escobar (first round)
3. (Spain) Sergio Martos Gornés / (India) Vijay Sundar Prashanth (quarterfinals)
4. (Argentina) Federico Agustín Gómez / (Venezuela) Luis David Martínez (champions)

== Draw ==
Key

- Q = Qualifier
- WC = Wild card
- LL = Lucky loser
- Alt = Alternate
- ITF = ITF entry
- PR = Protected ranking
- SR = Special ranking
- SE = Special exempt
- JE = Junior exempt
- JR = Junior Accelerator Programme entrant
- CO = College Accelerator Programme entrant
- NG = Next Gen Accelerator Program entrant
- w/o = Walkover
- r = Retired
- d = Defaulted

=== Draw ===
First round
1	(Switzerland) J Paul (Brazil) M Zormann	7	6
(Czech Republic) J Jermář (Serbia) S Latinović	5	0
(Denmark) J Ingildsen (Slovakia) M Karol	6	6
(Serbia) M Sabanov (Croatia) N Serdarušić	4	2
3	(Spain) S Martos Gornés (India) VS Prashanth	6	6
(Czech Republic) Jiří Barnat (Czech Republic) F Duda	4	4
WC	(Italy) Giacomo Gobbi (Italy) Luca Parenti	1	3
I Liutarevich (Netherlands) M Veldheer	6	6
(Italy) F Arnaboldi (Italy) A Pellegrino	5	7^{7}	[10]
WC	(Italy) F Bondioli (Italy) F Romano	7	6^{4}	[6]
(France) G Blancaneaux (Belgium) M Geerts	5	5
4	(Argentina) FA Gómez (Venezuela) LD Martínez	7	7
PR	(Argentina) A Collarini (Netherlands) M Vervoort	7^{7}	7^{7}
(Sweden) E Grevelius (Netherlands) M Hermans	6^{5}	6^{4}
(Slovakia) L Pokorný (Italy) G Ricca	4	7	[10]
2	(Australia) B Bayldon (Ecuador) G Escobar	6	5	[7]

Quarterfinals
1	(Switzerland) J Paul (Brazil) M Zormann	1	7^{7}	[10]
(Denmark) J Ingildsen (Slovakia) M Karol	6	6^{4}	[12]
3	(Spain) S Martos Gornés (India) VS Prashanth	1	6	[7]
I Liutarevich (Netherlands) M Veldheer	6	3	[10]
(Italy) F Arnaboldi (Italy) A Pellegrino	3	2
4	(Argentina) FA Gómez (Venezuela) LD Martínez	6	6
PR	(Argentina) A Collarini (Netherlands) M Vervoort	2	4
(Slovakia) L Pokorný (Italy) G Ricca	6	6

Semifinals
(Denmark) J Ingildsen (Slovakia) M Karol	6	4	[10]
I Liutarevich (Netherlands) M Veldheer	2	6	[8]
4	(Argentina) FA Gómez (Venezuela) LD Martínez	7	6
(Slovakia) L Pokorný (Italy) G Ricca	5	3

Final
(Denmark) J Ingildsen (Slovakia) M Karol	5	6^{5}
4	(Argentina) FA Gómez (Venezuela) LD Martínez	7	7^{7}
