= 2021 São Paulo Challenger de Tênis – Singles =

Singles
- 2021 São Paulo Challenger de Tênis

Final
- Champion: (Argentina) Juan Pablo Ficovich
- Runner-up: (Italy) Luciano Darderi
- Score: 6–3, 7–5

Events
Singles	Doubles
← 2020 ·	São Paulo Challenger de Tênis	· 2022 →

Felipe Meligeni Alves was the defending champion but withdrew before his semifinal match with Luciano Darderi.

Juan Pablo Ficovich won the title after defeating Darderi 6–3, 7–5 in the final.

== Seeds ==
1. (Uruguay) Pablo Cuevas (withdrew)
2. (Bolivia) Hugo Dellien (quarterfinals)
3. (Brazil) Thiago Seyboth Wild (second round)
4. (Argentina) Juan Ignacio Londero (first round)
5. (Chile) Nicolás Jarry (semifinals)
6. (Brazil) Felipe Meligeni Alves (semifinals, withdrew)
7. (Argentina) Nicolás Kicker (first round)
8. (Argentina) Pedro Cachin (second round)

== Draw ==
=== Key ===
- Q = Qualifier
- WC = Wild card
- LL = Lucky loser
- Alt = Alternate
- SE = Special exempt
- PR = Protected ranking
- ITF = ITF entry
- JE = Junior exempt
- w/o = Walkover
- r = Retired
- d = Defaulted
- SR = Special ranking

=== Finals ===
Semifinals
6	(Brazil) Felipe Meligeni Alves
Q	(Italy) Luciano Darderi	w/o
(Argentina) Juan Pablo Ficovich	6	7^{7}
5	(Chile) Nicolás Jarry	2	6^{5}

Final
Q	(Italy) Luciano Darderi	3	5
(Argentina) Juan Pablo Ficovich	6	7

=== Top half ===
First round
(Argentina) A Collarini	6	7^{7}
(Argentina) GA Olivieri	2	6^{5}
WC	(Brazil) Oscar José Gutierrez	7	6^{5}	0
(Argentina) H Casanova	5	7^{7}	6
(Switzerland) J Nikles	6^{4}	7^{7}	6
(Japan) K Uchida	7^{7}	6^{3}	0
(Serbia) P Krstin	4	0^{r}
6	(Brazil) F Meligeni Alves	6	0
3	(Brazil) T Seyboth Wild	6	6
Alt	(Colombia) A González	3	4
(Argentina) F Díaz Acosta	7	6
Q	(Argentina) G Villanueva	5	1
WC	(Brazil) M Alves	1	1
Q	(Italy) L Darderi	6	6
(Spain) N Álvarez Varona	7	6
7	(Argentina) N Kicker	5	3

Second round
(Argentina) A Collarini	4
(Argentina) H Casanova	1^{r}
(Switzerland) J Nikles	7^{7}	2	1
6	(Brazil) F Meligeni Alves	6^{5}	6	6
3	(Brazil) T Seyboth Wild	3	5
(Argentina) F Díaz Acosta	6	7
Q	(Italy) L Darderi	6	6
(Spain) N Álvarez Varona	4	1

Quarterfinals
(Argentina) A Collarini	4	6	3
6	(Brazil) F Meligeni Alves	6	4	6
(Argentina) F Díaz Acosta	3	4
Q	(Italy) L Darderi	6	6

Semifinals
6	(Brazil) F Meligeni Alves
Q	(Italy) L Darderi	w/o

=== Bottom half ===
First round
8	(Argentina) P Cachin	6	6
Alt	(Argentina) Facundo Juárez	3	2
(Argentina) JP Ficovich	5	6	6
(Dominican Republic) R Cid Subervi	7	4	0
Q	(Argentina) Matías Zukas	1	1
Q	(Brazil) I Marcondes	6	6
WC	(Brazil) G Heide	6	7
4	(Argentina) JI Londero	3	5
5	(Chile) N Jarry	7^{7}	6
LL	(Colombia) A Gómez	6^{1}	4
(Brazil) P Sakamoto	2	7	7
Alt	(Brazil) Gilbert Klier Júnior	6	5	5
(Brazil) O Luz	3	6^{4}
Alt	(Brazil) D Dutra da Silva	6	7^{7}
(Brazil) M Pucinelli de Almeida	3	5
2	(Bolivia) H Dellien	6	7

Second round
8	(Argentina) P Cachin	5	2
(Argentina) JP Ficovich	7	6
Q	(Brazil) I Marcondes	6	4	3
WC	(Brazil) G Heide	4	6	6
5	(Chile) N Jarry	6	6
(Brazil) P Sakamoto	3	4
Alt	(Brazil) D Dutra da Silva	6	1	3
2	(Bolivia) H Dellien	4	6	6

Quarterfinals
(Argentina) JP Ficovich	6	6
WC	(Brazil) G Heide	3	0
5	(Chile) N Jarry	7^{7}	7^{7}
2	(Bolivia) H Dellien	6^{3}	6^{5}

Semifinals
(Argentina) JP Ficovich	6	7^{7}
5	(Chile) N Jarry	2	6^{5}
