= 2019 Open Castilla y León – Men's doubles =

Men's doubles
- 2019 Open Castilla y León

Final
- Champions: (Netherlands) Sander Arends (Netherlands) David Pel
- Runners-up: (Brazil) Orlando Luz (Brazil) Felipe Meligeni Alves
- Score: 6–4, 7–6^{(7–3)}

Events
| Singles | men | women |
| Doubles | men | women |
- Open Castilla y León

Andrés Artuñedo and David Pérez Sanz were the defending champions but only Artuñedo chose to defend his title, partnering Sergio Martos Gornés. Artuñedo lost in the first round to Andreas Siljeström and Andrea Vavassori.

Sander Arends and David Pel won the title after defeating Orlando Luz and Felipe Meligeni Alves 6–4, 7–6^{(7–3)} in the final.

== Seeds ==
1. (Netherlands) Sander Arends / (Netherlands) David Pel (champions)
2. (Sweden) Andreas Siljeström / (Italy) Andrea Vavassori (quarterfinals)
3. (Spain) Gerard Granollers / (Italy) Julian Ocleppo (semifinals)
4. (Colombia) Nicolás Barrientos / (Venezuela) Luis David Martínez (first round)

== Draw ==
Key

- Q = Qualifier
- WC = Wild card
- LL = Lucky loser
- Alt = Alternate
- ITF = ITF entry
- PR = Protected ranking
- SR = Special ranking
- SE = Special exempt
- JE = Junior exempt
- JR = Junior Accelerator Programme entrant
- CO = College Accelerator Programme entrant
- NG = Next Gen Accelerator Program entrant
- w/o = Walkover
- r = Retired
- d = Defaulted

First round
1 | (Netherlands) S Arends (Netherlands) D Pel | 7 | 6
PR | (Spain) C Gómez-Herrera (Ukraine) I Marchenko | 5 | 4
(Turkey) A Çelikbilek (Sweden) M Eriksson | 6 | 6
(Italy) A Bega (Italy) M Viola | 3 | 4
4 | (Colombia) N Barrientos (Venezuela) LD Martínez | 6 | 4 | [6]
(Spain) Carlos Boluda-Purkiss (Spain) R Ortega Olmedo | 3 | 6 | [10]
WC | (France) K de Schepper (Spain) R Ojeda Lara | 4 | 4
PR | (Spain) Í Cervantes (Spain) O Roca Batalla | 6 | 6
WC | (Portugal) F Gil (China) Y He | 6 | 6
WC | (Spain) Alejandro García (Spain) M Mansilla Díez | 4 | 4
ITF | (France) D Added (France) Tom Jomby | 6 | 2 | [3]
3 | (Spain) G Granollers (Italy) J Ocleppo | 3 | 6 | [10]
(Russia) P Kotov (Bosnia and Herzegovina) A Šetkić | 4 | 6^{2}
ITF | (Brazil) O Luz (Brazil) F Meligeni Alves | 6 | 7^{7}
(Spain) A Artuñedo (Spain) S Martos Gornés | 2 | 4
2 | (Sweden) A Siljeström (Italy) A Vavassori | 6 | 6

Quarterfinals
1 | (Netherlands) S Arends (Netherlands) D Pel | 7^{7} | 6
(Turkey) A Çelikbilek (Sweden) M Eriksson | 6^{2} | 3
(Spain) C Boluda-Purkiss (Spain) R Ortega Olmedo | 6^{3} | 2
PR | (Spain) Í Cervantes (Spain) O Roca Batalla | 7^{7} | 6
WC | (Portugal) F Gil (China) Y He | 1 | 6^{4}
3 | (Spain) G Granollers (Italy) J Ocleppo | 6 | 7^{7}
ITF | (Brazil) O Luz (Brazil) F Meligeni Alves | 6 | 7
2 | (Sweden) A Siljeström (Italy) A Vavassori | 3 | 5

Semifinals
1 | (Netherlands) S Arends (Netherlands) D Pel | 6 | 6
PR | (Spain) Í Cervantes (Spain) O Roca Batalla | 2 | 0
3 | (Spain) G Granollers (Italy) J Ocleppo | 5 | 6^{4}
ITF | (Brazil) O Luz (Brazil) F Meligeni Alves | 7 | 7^{7}

Final
1 | (Netherlands) S Arends (Netherlands) D Pel | 6 | 7^{7}
ITF | (Brazil) O Luz (Brazil) F Meligeni Alves | 4 | 6^{3}
