= 2020 São Paulo Challenger de Tênis =

- Date: 23–29 November
- Edition: 6th
- Surface: Clay
- Location: São Paulo, Brazil

Champions

Singles
- (Brazil) Felipe Meligeni Alves

Doubles
- (Venezuela) Luis David Martínez / (Brazil) Felipe Meligeni Alves
← 2017 ·	São Paulo Challenger de Tênis	· 2021 →

The 2020 São Paulo Challenger de Tênis is a professional tennis tournament to be played on clay courts. It is the sixth edition of the tournament which is part of the 2020 ATP Challenger Tour. It takes place in São Paulo, Brazil between 23 and 29 November 2020. It was originally scheduled to take place in Florianópolis (hardcourt) but was relocated to São Paulo (clay court) and took the São Paulo Challenger de Tênis namesake after restrictions in Santa Catarina state due to the COVID-19 pandemic.

== Singles main-draw entrants ==
=== Seeds ===
Country	Player	Rank^{1}	Seed
BRA	Thiago Monteiro	84	1
BRA	Thiago Seyboth Wild	115	2
EGY	Mohamed Safwat	156	3
ECU	Emilio Gómez	159	4
KAZ	Dmitry Popko	172	5
POR	Frederico Ferreira Silva	201	6
BRA	João Menezes	204	7
ARG	Juan Pablo Ficovich	205	8

- ^{1} Rankings as of 16 November 2020.

=== Other entrants ===
The following players received wildcards into the singles main draw:

- (Portugal) Gastão Elias
- (Brazil) Igor Marcondes
- (Brazil) João Pedro Sorgi

The following player received entry into the singles main draw as an alternate:

- (Tunisia) Aziz Dougaz

The following players received entry from the qualifying draw:

- (Colombia) Alejandro González
- (Brazil) Matheus Pucinelli de Almeida
- (Brazil) João Lucas Reis da Silva
- (Argentina) Camilo Ugo Carabelli

The following player received entry as a lucky loser:

- (Zimbabwe) Benjamin Lock

== Champions ==
=== Singles ===
- (Brazil) Felipe Meligeni Alves def. (Portugal) Frederico Ferreira Silva 6–2, 7–6^{(7–1)}.

=== Doubles ===
- (Venezuela) Luis David Martínez / (Brazil) Felipe Meligeni Alves def. (Brazil) Rogério Dutra Silva / (Brazil) Fernando Romboli 6–3, 6–3.
