= 2020 Challenger Ciudad de Guayaquil =

- Date: 16–23 November
- Edition: 16th
- Surface: Clay
- Location: Guayaquil, Ecuador

Champions

Singles
- (Argentina) Francisco Cerúndolo

Doubles
- (Venezuela) Luis David Martínez / (Brazil) Felipe Meligeni Alves
- Challenger Ciudad de Guayaquil

The 2020 Challenger Ciudad de Guayaquil is a professional tennis tournament played on clay courts. It is the sixteenth edition of the tournament which is part of the 2020 ATP Challenger Tour. It will take place in Guayaquil, Ecuador between 16 and 23 November 2020.

== Singles main-draw entrants ==
=== Seeds ===
Country	Player	Rank^{1}	Seed
ARG	Federico Coria	91	1
ESP	Roberto Carballés Baena	103	2
SVK	Andrej Martin	105	3
ESP	Jaume Munar	108	4
POR	Pedro Sousa	111	5
PER	Juan Pablo Varillas	157	6
ECU	Emilio Gómez	159	7
CHI	Alejandro Tabilo	172	8

- ^{1} Rankings are as of 9 November 2020.

=== Other entrants ===
The following players received wildcards into the singles main draw:

- (Ecuador) Gonzalo Escobar
- (Ecuador) Diego Hidalgo
- (Ecuador) Antonio Cayetano March

The following players received entry from the qualifying draw:

- (Argentina) Hernán Casanova
- (Netherlands) Jesper de Jong
- (Spain) Oriol Roca Batalla
- (Argentina) Thiago Agustín Tirante

== Champions ==
=== Singles ===
- (Argentina) Francisco Cerúndolo def. (Slovakia) Andrej Martin 6–4, 3–6, 6–2.

=== Doubles ===
- (Venezuela) Luis David Martínez / (Brazil) Felipe Meligeni Alves def. (Spain) Sergio Martos Gornés / (Spain) Jaume Munar 6–0, 4–6, [10–3].
