= 2023 Modena Challenger – Doubles =

Doubles
- 2023 Modena Challenger

Final
- Champions: (United States) William Blumberg (Venezuela) Luis David Martínez
- Runners-up: (Czech Republic) Roman Jebavý (Ukraine) Vladyslav Manafov
- Score: 6–4, 6–4

Events
Singles	Doubles
- Modena Challenger

This was the first edition of the tournament.

William Blumberg and Luis David Martínez won the title after defeating Roman Jebavý and Vladyslav Manafov 6–4, 6–4 in the final.

== Seeds ==
1. (United States) William Blumberg / (Venezuela) Luis David Martínez (champions)
2. (Czech Republic) Roman Jebavý / (Ukraine) Vladyslav Manafov (final)
3. (Italy) Marco Bortolotti / (Ecuador) Diego Hidalgo (semifinals)
4. (Serbia) Ivan Sabanov / (Serbia) Matej Sabanov (quarterfinals)

== Draw ==
Key

- Q = Qualifier
- WC = Wild card
- LL = Lucky loser
- Alt = Alternate
- ITF = ITF entry
- PR = Protected ranking
- SR = Special ranking
- SE = Special exempt
- JE = Junior exempt
- JR = Junior Accelerator Programme entrant
- CO = College Accelerator Programme entrant
- NG = Next Gen Accelerator Program entrant
- w/o = Walkover
- r = Retired
- d = Defaulted

First round
1	(United States) W Blumberg (Venezuela) LD Martínez	6^{4}	6	[11]
(Brazil) F Romboli (Brazil) M Zormann	7^{7}	2	[9]
(India) A Chandrasekar (India) VS Prashanth	7^{7}	6
(Bolivia) M Dellien (Spain) P Martín Tiffon	6^{2}	4
3	(Italy) M Bortolotti (Ecuador) D Hidalgo	4	6	[10]
(Italy) S Caruso (France) J Eysseric	6	3	[4]
WC	(Italy) G Ferrari (Italy) J Ocleppo	3	6	[7]
PR	(Germany) A Begemann (India) R Ramanathan	6	3	[10]
(Bolivia) B Arias (Bolivia) F Zeballos	6	7^{7}
Alt	(Argentina) H Casanova (Argentina) Juan Bautista Otegui	3	6^{3}
(United States) A Lawson (Greece) M Pervolarakis	1	6	[6]
4	(Serbia) I Sabanov (Serbia) M Sabanov	6	3	[10]
(Mexico) H Hach Verdugo (Argentina) R Olivo	3	6	[5]
WC	(Italy) L Rottoli (Italy) Marcello Serafini	6	3	[10]
(Philippines) R Gonzales (Switzerland) L Margaroli	3	6^{3}
2	(Czech Republic) R Jebavý (Ukraine) V Manafov	6	7^{7}

Quarterfinals
1	(United States) W Blumberg (Venezuela) LD Martínez	6	6
(India) A Chandrasekar (India) VS Prashanth	4	2
3	(Italy) M Bortolotti (Ecuador) D Hidalgo	6	7^{7}
PR	(Germany) A Begemann (India) R Ramanathan	4	6^{4}
(Bolivia) B Arias (Bolivia) F Zeballos	7^{7}	6
4	(Serbia) I Sabanov (Serbia) M Sabanov	6^{4}	1
WC	(Italy) L Rottoli (Italy) M Serafini	7^{7}	4	[3]
2	(Czech Republic) R Jebavý (Ukraine) V Manafov	6^{5}	6	[10]

Semifinals
1	(United States) W Blumberg (Venezuela) LD Martínez	6^{4}	6	[10]
3	(Italy) M Bortolotti (Ecuador) D Hidalgo	7^{7}	3	[8]
(Bolivia) B Arias (Bolivia) F Zeballos	3	4
2	(Czech Republic) R Jebavý (Ukraine) V Manafov	6	6

Final
1	(United States) W Blumberg (Venezuela) LD Martínez	6	6
2	(Czech Republic) R Jebavý (Ukraine) V Manafov	4	4
