= 2019 Open Castilla y León – Men's singles =

Men's singles
- 2019 Open Castilla y León

Final
- Champion: (Spain) Nicola Kuhn
- Runner-up: (Russia) Pavel Kotov
- Score: 6–2, 7–6^{(7–4)}

Events
| Singles | men | women |
| Doubles | men | women |
- Open Castilla y León

Ugo Humbert was the defending champion but chose not to defend his title.

Nicola Kuhn won the title after defeating Pavel Kotov 6–2, 7–6^{(7–4)} in the final.

== Seeds ==
All seeds receive a bye into the second round.

1. (Slovenia) Blaž Rola (quarterfinals)
2. (Netherlands) Tallon Griekspoor (second round)
3. (France) Constant Lestienne (quarterfinals)
4. (Italy) Andrea Arnaboldi (second round)
5. (Spain) Nicola Kuhn (champion)
6. (Italy) Matteo Viola (third round)
7. (Italy) Luca Vanni (second round)
8. (France) Kenny de Schepper (second round)
9. (Spain) Roberto Ortega Olmedo (third round)
10. (Russia) Pavel Kotov (final)
11. (Spain) Oriol Roca Batalla (second round)
12. (Netherlands) Scott Griekspoor (second round)
13. (Italy) Andrea Vavassori (second round)
14. (France) Baptiste Crepatte (third round)
15. (Uzbekistan) Khumoyun Sultanov (second round)
16. (Bosnia and Herzegovina) Aldin Šetkić (second round)

== Draw ==
Key

- Q = Qualifier
- WC = Wild card
- LL = Lucky loser
- Alt = Alternate
- ITF = ITF entry
- PR = Protected ranking
- SR = Special ranking
- SE = Special exempt
- JE = Junior exempt
- JR = Junior Accelerator Programme entrant
- CO = College Accelerator Programme entrant
- NG = Next Gen Accelerator Program entrant
- w/o = Walkover
- r = Retired
- d = Defaulted

=== Finals ===
Quarterfinals
1 | (Slovenia) Blaž Rola | 7^{7} | 6^{8} | 4
(France) Hugo Grenier | 6^{5} | 7^{10} | 6
3 | (France) Constant Lestienne | 6 | 3 | 6^{5}
10 | (Russia) Pavel Kotov | 2 | 6 | 7^{7}
5 | (Spain) Nicola Kuhn | 7 | 6
(Turkey) Altuğ Çelikbilek | 5 | 4
ITF | (Sweden) Markus Eriksson | 6^{5} | 6 | 6
(France) Antoine Escoffier | 7^{7} | 2 | 3

Semifinals
(France) Hugo Grenier | 2 | 5
10 | (Russia) Pavel Kotov | 6 | 7
5 | (Spain) Nicola Kuhn | 6 | 6
ITF | (Sweden) Markus Eriksson | 2 | 2

Final
10 | (Russia) Pavel Kotov | 2 | 6^{4}
5 | (Spain) Nicola Kuhn | 6 | 7^{7}

=== Top half ===
==== Section 1 ====
First round
ITF | (Russia) K Kravchuk | 3 | 6 | 7^{7}
WC | (Spain) Í Cervantes | 6 | 1 | 6^{4}
(Spain) G Granollers | 6^{5} | 4
Q | (Portugal) F Gil | 7^{7} | 6
(Spain) R Ojeda Lara | 6^{1} | 3
(Italy) A Basso | 7^{7} | 6
(France) H Grenier | 6 | 6
(China) Y He | 0 | 2

Second round
1 | (Slovenia) B Rola | 6 | 6
ITF | (Russia) K Kravchuk | 4 | 4
Q | (Portugal) F Gil | 4 | 1
14 | (France) Baptiste Crepatte | 6 | 6
11 | (Spain) O Roca Batalla | 4 | 2
(Italy) A Basso | 6 | 6
(France) H Grenier | 7^{7} | 6
7 | (Italy) L Vanni | 6^{5} | 3

Third round
1 | (Slovenia) B Rola | 7 | 6
14 | (France) B Crepatte | 5 | 1
(Italy) A Basso | 7^{7} | 3 | 6^{5}
(France) H Grenier | 6^{3} | 6 | 7^{7}

Quarterfinals
1 | (Slovenia) B Rola | 7^{7} | 6^{8} | 4
(France) H Grenier | 6^{5} | 7^{10} | 6

==== Section 2 ====
First round
(Italy) A Bega | 3 | 6 | 0
(Spain) A Artuñedo | 6 | 3 | 6
ITF | (Netherlands) B van de Zandschulp | 5 | 5
(Germany) Tobias Simon | 7 | 7
(France) A Rinderknech | 6^{3} | 6^{2}
(France) M Martineau | 7^{7} | 7^{7}
WC | (Spain) N Álvarez Varona | 2 | 3
ITF | (Brazil) F Meligeni Alves | 6 | 6

Second round
3 | (France) C Lestienne | 6 | 6
(Spain) A Artuñedo | 4 | 1
(Germany) T Simon | 7 | 6
16 | (Bosnia and Herzegovina) A Šetkić | 5 | 4
10 | (Russia) P Kotov | 3 | 6 | 7
(France) M Martineau | 6 | 3 | 5
ITF | (Brazil) F Meligeni Alves | 2 | 1
6 | (Italy) M Viola | 6 | 6

Third round
3 | (France) C Lestienne | 7^{8} | 6
(Germany) T Simon | 6^{6} | 2
10 | (Russia) P Kotov | 6 | 6
6 | (Italy) M Viola | 1 | 3

Quarterfinals
3 | (France) C Lestienne | 6 | 3 | 6^{5}
10 | (Russia) P Kotov | 2 | 6 | 7^{7}

=== Bottom half ===
==== Section 3 ====
First round
PR | (Colombia) N Barrientos | 6 | 7
(France) D Added | 4 | 5
WC | (Spain) M Damas | 7^{8} | 6^{8} | 2
(Ukraine) I Marchenko | 6^{6} | 7^{10} | 6
(Turkey) A Çelikbilek | 6 | 6
WC | (India) Digvijaypratap Singh | 4 | 4
WC | (Spain) Mario González Fernández | 6 | 2 | 4
(Spain) C Gómez-Herrera | 0 | 6 | 6

Second round
5 | (Spain) N Kuhn | 6 | 6
PR | (Colombia) N Barrientos | 4 | 3
(Ukraine) I Marchenko | 7^{7} | 6
12 | (Netherlands) S Griekspoor | 6^{2} | 4
13 | (Italy) A Vavassori | 7^{10} | 2 | 4
(Turkey) A Çelikbilek | 6^{8} | 6 | 6
(Spain) C Gómez-Herrera | 6 | 2 | 6
4 | (Italy) A Arnaboldi | 2 | 6 | 4

Third round
5 | (Spain) N Kuhn | 7^{7} | 6
(Ukraine) I Marchenko | 6^{4} | 1
(Turkey) A Çelikbilek | 6 | 4 | 6
(Spain) C Gómez-Herrera | 4 | 6 | 2

Quarterfinals
5 | (Spain) N Kuhn | 7 | 6
(Turkey) A Çelikbilek | 5 | 4

==== Section 4 ====
First round
ITF | (Sweden) M Eriksson | 6 | 6
(France) Tom Jomby | 3 | 1
(Russia) A Dubrivnyy | 6^{3} | 6 | 2
(Italy) J Ocleppo | 7^{7} | 4 | 6
(France) A Escoffier | 6 | 6
Q | (Italy) W Trusendi | 2 | 0
ITF | (Brazil) O Luz | 6^{3} | 6^{9}
(Spain) Carlos Boluda-Purkiss | 7^{7} | 7^{11}

Second round
8 | (France) K de Schepper | 4 | 7^{7} | 3
ITF | (Sweden) M Eriksson | 6 | 6^{2} | 6
(Italy) J Ocleppo | 7^{7} | 3 | 4
9 | (Spain) R Ortega Olmedo | 6^{1} | 6 | 6
15 | (Uzbekistan) K Sultanov | 6 | 2 | 6^{4}
(France) A Escoffier | 1 | 6 | 7^{7}
(Spain) C Boluda-Purkiss | 4 | 6 | 6
2 | (Netherlands) T Griekspoor | 6 | 0 | 3

Third round
ITF | (Sweden) M Eriksson | 1 | 6 | 7
9 | (Spain) R Ortega Olmedo | 6 | 1 | 5
(France) A Escoffier | 6 | 6
(Spain) C Boluda-Purkiss | 4 | 4

Quarterfinals
ITF | (Sweden) M Eriksson | 6^{5} | 6 | 6
(France) A Escoffier | 7^{7} | 2 | 3
