= 2024 Modena Challenger – Singles =

Singles
- 2024 Modena Challenger

Final
- Champion: (Spain) Albert Ramos Viñolas
- Runner-up: (Italy) Federico Arnaboldi
- Score: 6–4, 3–6, 6–2

Events
Singles	Doubles
- Modena Challenger

Emilio Nava was the defending champion but chose not to defend his title.

Albert Ramos Viñolas won the title after defeating Federico Arnaboldi 6–4, 3–6, 6–2 in the final.

== Seeds ==
1. (Spain) Albert Ramos Viñolas (champion)
2. (Argentina) Thiago Agustín Tirante (first round)
3. (France) Titouan Droguet (second round)
4. (Italy) Matteo Gigante (withdrew)
5. (Italy) Andrea Pellegrino (quarterfinals)
6. (France) Benoît Paire (first round)
7. (Peru) Juan Pablo Varillas (quarterfinals)
8. (Spain) Oriol Roca Batalla (quarterfinals)
9. (Chinese Taipei) Tseng Chun-hsin (semifinals)

== Draw ==
Key

- Q = Qualifier
- WC = Wild card
- LL = Lucky loser
- Alt = Alternate
- ITF = ITF entry
- PR = Protected ranking
- SR = Special ranking
- SE = Special exempt
- JE = Junior exempt
- JR = Junior Accelerator Programme entrant
- CO = College Accelerator Programme entrant
- NG = Next Gen Accelerator Program entrant
- w/o = Walkover
- r = Retired
- d = Defaulted

=== Finals ===
Semifinals
1	(Spain) Albert Ramos Viñolas	6	6
9	(Chinese Taipei) Tseng Chun-hsin	4	4
WC	(Italy) Federico Arnaboldi	1	7^{7}	6
(Argentina) Andrea Collarini	6	6^{3}	2

Final
1	(Spain) Albert Ramos Viñolas	6	3	6
WC	(Italy) Federico Arnaboldi	4	6	2

=== Top half ===
First round
1	(Spain) A Ramos Viñolas	3	6	6
Alt	(Italy) G Fonio	6	3	2
Alt	(Switzerland) R Bertola	4	1
(Italy) S Travaglia	6	6
(Spain) B Zapata Miralles	4	3
LL	(Italy) Marcello Serafini	6	6
(Argentina) FA Gómez	7	7
6	(France) B Paire	5	5
9	(Chinese Taipei) C-h Tseng	2	6	6
Q	(Italy) Alessandro Pecci	6	3	4
Alt	(Italy) R Brancaccio	3	2
WC	(Italy) J Berrettini	6	6
Alt	(Italy) F Forti	6^{5}	3
WC	(Italy) G Piraino	7^{7}	6
Q	(Denmark) A Holmgren	7	4	3
5	(Italy) A Pellegrino	5	6	6

Second round
1	(Spain) A Ramos Viñolas	6	7^{7}
(Italy) S Travaglia	3	6^{6}
LL	(Italy) M Serafini	6^{4}	6	7
(Argentina) FA Gómez	7^{7}	3	5
9	(Chinese Taipei) C-h Tseng	6	6
WC	(Italy) J Berrettini	2	0
WC	(Italy) G Piraino	4	5
5	(Italy) A Pellegrino	6	7

Quarterfinals
1	(Spain) A Ramos Viñolas	6	6
LL	(Italy) M Serafini	3	3
9	(Chinese Taipei) C-h Tseng	7	2	6
5	(Italy) A Pellegrino	5	6	2

Semifinals
1	(Spain) A Ramos Viñolas	6	6
9	(Chinese Taipei) C-h Tseng	4	4

=== Bottom half ===
First round
8	(Spain) O Roca Batalla	6	7
(Italy) Samuel Vincent Ruggeri	4	5
Q	(Spain) D Mérida	1	6	4
(Italy) E Dalla Valle	6	1	6
WC	(Italy) F Arnaboldi	7	3	6
Q	(Italy) F Gaio	5	6	2
Q	(Italy) Mariano Tammaro	6	3	6^{3}
3	(France) T Droguet	4	6	7^{7}
7	(Peru) JP Varillas	6	6
(Croatia) D Prižmić	3	1
Q	(Italy) M Cecchinato	4	5
Alt	(Italy) A Giannessi	6	3^{r}
(Peru) G Bueno	2	7^{7}	7
(France) K Jacquet	6	6^{4}	5
(Argentina) A Collarini	6	7
2	(Argentina) TA Tirante	3	5

Second round
8	(Spain) O Roca Batalla	6	1	6
(Italy) E Dalla Valle	3	6	1
WC	(Italy) F Arnaboldi	6	6^{5}	6
3	(France) T Droguet	2	7^{7}	3
7	(Peru) JP Varillas	6	7^{7}
Q	(Italy) M Cecchinato	4	6^{1}
(Peru) G Bueno	5	3
(Argentina) A Collarini	7	6

Quarterfinals
8	(Spain) O Roca Batalla	6	1	2
WC	(Italy) F Arnaboldi	2	6	6
7	(Peru) JP Varillas	4	6	5
(Argentina) A Collarini	6	4	7

Semifinals
WC	(Italy) F Arnaboldi	1	7^{7}	6
(Argentina) A Collarini	6	6^{3}	2
