= 2026 Savannah Challenger – Doubles =

Doubles
- 2026 Savannah Challenger

Final
- Champions: (Canada) Cleeve Harper (United Kingdom) David Stevenson
- Runners-up: (Venezuela) Luis David Martínez (Colombia) Cristian Rodríguez
- Score: 7–6^{(7–4)}, 6–2

Events
| Singles | Doubles |
- Savannah Challenger

Federico Agustín Gómez and Luis David Martínez were the defending champions but chose to defend their title with different partners. Gómez partnered Nicolás Kicker but withdrew from the tournament before his first round match. Martínez partnered Cristian Rodríguez but lost in the final to Cleeve Harper and David Stevenson.

Harper and Stevenson won the title after defeating Martínez and Rodríguez 7–6^{(7–4)}, 6–2 in the final.

== Seeds ==
1. (Canada) Cleeve Harper / (United Kingdom) David Stevenson (champions)
2. (Bolivia) Boris Arias / (Denmark) Johannes Ingildsen (semifinals)
3. (United States) George Goldhoff / (Australia) Patrick Harper (semifinals)
4. (United States) Nathaniel Lammons / (United States) Jackson Withrow (first round)

== Draw ==
Key

- Q = Qualifier
- WC = Wild card
- LL = Lucky loser
- Alt = Alternate
- ITF = ITF entry
- PR = Protected ranking
- SR = Special ranking
- SE = Special exempt
- JE = Junior exempt
- JR = Junior Accelerator Programme entrant
- CO = College Accelerator Programme entrant
- NG = Next Gen Accelerator Program entrant
- w/o = Walkover
- r = Retired
- d = Defaulted

First round
1 | (Canada) C Harper (United Kingdom) D Stevenson | 6 | 7
(United States) B Shick (United States) C Smith | 2 | 5
WC | (United States) Boris Kozlov (United States) S Kozlov | w/o
(Mexico) A Magadán (Uruguay) F Roncadelli
3 | (United States) G Goldhoff (Australia) P Harper | 6 | 6
(United Kingdom) S Duncan (Brazil) D Dutra da Silva | 4 | 2
(United States) K Chopra (United States) A Martin | 6 | 6
PR | (United States) Reid Jarvis (United States) Jack Vance | 4 | 4
(Argentina) FA Gómez (Argentina) N Kicker
(Venezuela) LD Martínez (Colombia) C Rodríguez | w/o
(Venezuela) Juan José Bianchi (United States) J Sheehy | 4 | 6 | [11]
4 | (United States) N Lammons (United States) J Withrow | 6 | 4 | [9]
(Czech Republic) J Jermář (Poland) S Kielan | 7^{7} | 6
(United States) Wally Thayne (United States) Jamie Vance | 6^{3} | 3
PR | (United States) Nicholas Bybel (United Kingdom) O Crawford | 2 | 3
2 | (Bolivia) B Arias (Denmark) J Ingildsen | 6 | 6

Quarterfinals
1 | (Canada) C Harper (United Kingdom) D Stevenson | 6 | 7
WC | (United States) B Kozlov (United States) S Kozlov | 2 | 5
3 | (United States) G Goldhoff (Australia) P Harper | 6 | 6
(United States) K Chopra (United States) A Martin | 0 | 4
(Venezuela) LD Martínez (Colombia) C Rodríguez | 6 | 7
(Venezuela) JJ Bianchi (United States) J Sheehy | 4 | 5
(Czech Republic) J Jermář (Poland) S Kielan | 0 | 2
2 | (Bolivia) B Arias (Denmark) J Ingildsen | 6 | 6

Semifinals
1 | (Canada) C Harper (United Kingdom) D Stevenson | 6^{6} | 7^{7} | [10]
3 | (United States) G Goldhoff (Australia) P Harper | 7^{8} | 6^{2} | [6]
(Venezuela) LD Martínez (Colombia) C Rodríguez | 6 | 6
2 | (Bolivia) B Arias (Denmark) J Ingildsen | 2 | 3

Final
1 | (Canada) C Harper (United Kingdom) D Stevenson | 7^{7} | 6
(Venezuela) LD Martínez (Colombia) C Rodríguez | 6^{4} | 2
