= 2020 Challenger Ciudad de Guayaquil – Singles =

Singles
- 2020 Challenger Ciudad de Guayaquil

Final
- Champion: (Argentina) Francisco Cerúndolo
- Runner-up: (Slovakia) Andrej Martin
- Score: 6–4, 3–6, 6–2

Events
| Singles | Doubles |
- Challenger Ciudad de Guayaquil

Thiago Seyboth Wild was the defending champion but chose not to defend his title.

Francisco Cerúndolo won the title after defeating Andrej Martin 6–4, 3–6, 6–2 in the final.

== Seeds ==
1. (Argentina) Federico Coria (first round)
2. (Spain) Roberto Carballés Baena (semifinals)
3. (Slovakia) Andrej Martin (final)
4. (Spain) Jaume Munar (quarterfinals)
5. (Portugal) Pedro Sousa (quarterfinals)
6. (Peru) Juan Pablo Varillas (second round)
7. (Ecuador) Emilio Gómez (first round)
8. (Chile) Alejandro Tabilo (second round)

== Draw ==
Key

- Q = Qualifier
- WC = Wild card
- LL = Lucky loser
- Alt = Alternate
- ITF = ITF entry
- PR = Protected ranking
- SR = Special ranking
- SE = Special exempt
- JE = Junior exempt
- JR = Junior Accelerator Programme entrant
- CO = College Accelerator Programme entrant
- NG = Next Gen Accelerator Program entrant
- w/o = Walkover
- r = Retired
- d = Defaulted

=== Finals ===
Semifinals
Q | (Netherlands) Jesper de Jong | 3 | 6 | 3
3 | (Slovakia) Andrej Martin | 6 | 2 | 6
(Argentina) Francisco Cerúndolo | 6 | 6
2 | (Spain) Roberto Carballés Baena | 2 | 1

Final
3 | (Slovakia) Andrej Martin | 4 | 6 | 2
(Argentina) Francisco Cerúndolo | 6 | 3 | 6

=== Top half ===
First round
1 | (Argentina) F Coria | 6^{7} | 7^{7} | 6^{8}
Q | (Spain) O Roca Batalla | 7^{9} | 6^{2} | 7^{10}
WC | (Ecuador) D Hidalgo | 3 | 6^{5}
WC | (Ecuador) G Escobar | 6 | 7^{7}
Q | (Netherlands) J de Jong | 5 | 6 | 7
(Spain) M Vilella Martínez | 7 | 3 | 5
(Brazil) J Menezes | 3 | 5
8 | (Chile) A Tabilo | 6 | 7
3 | (Slovakia) A Martin | 6 | 7
(Spain) R Ortega Olmedo | 4 | 5
(Chile) MT Barrios Vera | 6 | 6
Q | (Argentina) TA Tirante | 3 | 2
(Argentina) S Báez | 7 | 7^{7}
(Ecuador) R Quiroz | 5 | 6^{1}
(Argentina) F Mena | 3 | 7^{9} | 6
7 | (Ecuador) E Gómez | 6 | 6^{7} | 2

Second round
Q | (Spain) O Roca Batalla | 6 | 6
WC | (Ecuador) G Escobar | 4 | 3
Q | (Netherlands) J de Jong | 6 | 6
8 | (Chile) A Tabilo | 2 | 2
3 | (Slovakia) A Martin | 6 | 6
(Chile) MT Barrios Vera | 4 | 1
(Argentina) S Báez | 7^{7} | 6
(Argentina) F Mena | 6^{4} | 2

Quarterfinals
Q | (Spain) O Roca Batalla | 2 | 2
Q | (Netherlands) J de Jong | 6 | 6
3 | (Slovakia) A Martin | 6 | 6
(Argentina) S Báez | 4 | 4

Semifinals
Q | (Netherlands) J de Jong | 3 | 6 | 3
3 | (Slovakia) A Martin | 6 | 2 | 6

=== Bottom half ===
First round
6 | (Peru) JP Varillas | 7 | 6
(Brazil) F Meligeni Alves | 5 | 4
(Argentina) F Cerúndolo | 6 | 6
(Brazil) P Sakamoto | 3 | 3
WC | (Ecuador) AC March | 6^{5} | 4
(Sweden) C Lindell | 7^{7} | 6
(Argentina) JP Ficovich | 7 | 4 | 2
4 | (Spain) J Munar | 5 | 6 | 6
5 | (Portugal) P Sousa | 2 | 6 | 6
(Argentina) TM Etcheverry | 6 | 4 | 4
(Czech Republic) V Kopřiva | 6 | 6
(Serbia) P Krstin | 1 | 4
(Netherlands) J Sels | 6 | 2 | 4
(Argentina) R Olivo | 4 | 6 | 6
Q | (Argentina) H Casanova | 0^{r}
2 | (Spain) R Carballés Baena | 5

Second round
6 | (Peru) JP Varillas | 1 | 7^{11} | 6^{2}
(Argentina) F Cerúndolo | 6 | 6^{9} | 7^{7}
(Sweden) C Lindell | 0 | 6 | 4
4 | (Spain) J Munar | 6 | 4 | 6
5 | (Portugal) P Sousa | 1 | 6 | 6
(Czech Republic) V Kopřiva | 6 | 3 | 4
(Argentina) R Olivo | 4 | 4
2 | (Spain) R Carballés Baena | 6 | 6

Quarterfinals
(Argentina) F Cerúndolo | 4 | 6 | 6
4 | (Spain) J Munar | 6 | 4 | 2
5 | (Portugal) P Sousa | 4 | 2
2 | (Spain) R Carballés Baena | 6 | 6

Semifinals
(Argentina) F Cerúndolo | 6 | 6
2 | (Spain) R Carballés Baena | 2 | 1
