= 2020 São Paulo Challenger de Tênis – Doubles =

Doubles
- 2020 São Paulo Challenger de Tênis

Final
- Champions: (Venezuela) Luis David Martínez (Brazil) Felipe Meligeni Alves
- Runners-up: (Brazil) Rogério Dutra Silva (Brazil) Fernando Romboli
- Score: 6–3, 6–3

Events
Singles	Doubles
← 2017 ·	São Paulo Challenger de Tênis	· 2021 →

This was the first edition of the tournament. It was originally scheduled to take place in Florianópolis but was relocated to São Paulo and took the São Paulo Challenger de Tênis namesake.

Luis David Martínez and Felipe Meligeni Alves won the title after defeating Rogério Dutra Silva and Fernando Romboli 6–3, 6–3 in the final.

== Seeds ==
1. (Venezuela) Luis David Martínez / (Brazil) Felipe Meligeni Alves (champions)
2. (United States) Martin Redlicki / (United States) Hunter Reese (quarterfinals)
3. (Uruguay) Martín Cuevas / (Brazil) Orlando Luz (quarterfinals)
4. (Argentina) Guillermo Durán / (Ecuador) Roberto Quiroz (semifinals)

== Draw ==
=== Key ===
- Q = Qualifier
- WC = Wild card
- LL = Lucky loser
- Alt = Alternate
- SE = Special exempt
- PR = Protected ranking
- ITF = ITF entry
- JE = Junior exempt
- w/o = Walkover
- r = Retired
- d = Defaulted
- SR = Special ranking

First round
1	(Venezuela) LD Martínez (Brazil) F Meligeni Alves	6	3	[10]
(Tunisia) A Dougaz (Zimbabwe) B Lock	3	6	[7]
(Portugal) F Ferreira Silva (Argentina) M Kestelboim	6	6
(Chinese Taipei) C-h Tseng (Japan) K Uchida	4	3
4	(Argentina) G Durán (Ecuador) R Quiroz	6	7
(Brazil) R Matos (Brazil) J Menezes	3	5
(Russia) T Gabashvili (Kazakhstan) D Popko	6	6
WC	(Brazil) Gustavo Teisen Pereira (Brazil) Gabriel Tumasonis	4	1
WC	(Brazil) P Boscardin Dias (Brazil) E Ribeiro	1	7^{8}	[3]
(Brazil) R Dutra Silva (Brazil) F Romboli	6	6^{6}	[10]
(Ecuador) D Hidalgo (Brazil) P Sakamoto	6	6^{2}	[7]
3	(Uruguay) M Cuevas (Brazil) O Luz	2	7^{7}	[10]
WC	(Portugal) G Elias (Germany) Paulo Knippling	3	4
(Spain) C Gómez-Herrera (Spain) R Ortega Olmedo	6	6
Alt	(Argentina) S Báez (Argentina) GA Olivieri	1	4
2	(United States) Ma Redlicki (United States) H Reese	6	6

Quarterfinals
1	(Venezuela) LD Martínez (Brazil) F Meligeni Alves	6	6
(Portugal) F Ferreira Silva (Argentina) M Kestelboim	3	2
4	(Argentina) G Durán (Ecuador) R Quiroz	6	6
(Russia) T Gabashvili (Kazakhstan) D Popko	0	1
(Brazil) R Dutra Silva (Brazil) F Romboli	6^{8}	6	[10]
3	(Uruguay) M Cuevas (Brazil) O Luz	7^{10}	4	[4]
(Spain) C Gómez-Herrera (Spain) R Ortega Olmedo	6	6^{6}	[10]
2	(United States) Ma Redlicki (United States) H Reese	4	7^{8}	[7]

Semifinals
1	(Venezuela) LD Martínez (Brazil) F Meligeni Alves	6	6
4	(Argentina) G Durán (Ecuador) R Quiroz	4	2
(Brazil) R Dutra Silva (Brazil) F Romboli	6	6
(Spain) C Gómez-Herrera (Spain) R Ortega Olmedo	4	2

Final
1	(Venezuela) LD Martínez (Brazil) F Meligeni Alves	6	6
(Brazil) R Dutra Silva (Brazil) F Romboli	3	3
