= 2025 Modena Challenger – Singles =

Singles
- 2025 Modena Challenger

Final
- Champion: (Italy) Stefano Travaglia
- Runner-up: (Brazil) Thiago Seyboth Wild
- Score: 6–4, 6–3

Events
Singles	Doubles
- Modena Challenger

Albert Ramos Viñolas was the defending champion but chose not to defend his title.

Stefano Travaglia won the title after defeating Thiago Seyboth Wild 6–4, 6–3 in the final.

== Seeds ==
1. (Spain) Carlos Taberner (second round)
2. (Colombia) Daniel Elahi Galán (second round)
3. (Argentina) Juan Manuel Cerúndolo (quarterfinals)
4. (Brazil) Thiago Seyboth Wild (final)
5. (United States) Tristan Boyer (first round)
6. (Argentina) Thiago Agustín Tirante (second round)
7. (Argentina) Román Andrés Burruchaga (first round)
8. (Argentina) Federico Agustín Gómez (first round)

== Draw ==
Key

- Q = Qualifier
- WC = Wild card
- LL = Lucky loser
- Alt = Alternate
- ITF = ITF entry
- PR = Protected ranking
- SR = Special ranking
- SE = Special exempt
- JE = Junior exempt
- JR = Junior Accelerator Programme entrant
- CO = College Accelerator Programme entrant
- NG = Next Gen Accelerator Program entrant
- w/o = Walkover
- r = Retired
- d = Defaulted

=== Finals ===
Semifinals
(Switzerland) Jérôme Kym	7^{7}	6^{4}	4
4	(Brazil) Thiago Seyboth Wild	6^{5}	7^{7}	6
Alt	(Italy) Federico Cinà	6	3	4
Q	(Italy) Stefano Travaglia	1	6	6

Final
4	(Brazil) Thiago Seyboth Wild	4	3
Q	(Italy) Stefano Travaglia	6	6

=== Top half ===
First round
1	(Spain) C Taberner	6	7
(Belgium) M Geerts	4	5
WC	(Italy) Luca Parenti	2	4
(Switzerland) J Kym	6	6
WC	(Italy) M Cecchinato	7^{7}	3	6
(Brazil) T Monteiro	6^{1}	6	1
(Netherlands) M Houkes	6	6
8	(Argentina) FA Gómez	4	3
4	(Brazil) T Seyboth Wild	6	6
Q	(Spain) M Alcalá Gurri	1	2
Q	(United States) T Kodat	1	6	7^{8}
(Argentina) A Collarini	6	3	6^{6}
Q	(Greece) S Sakellaridis	6	7^{7}
WC	(Italy) F Bondioli	4	6^{5}
Q	(Tunisia) M Echargui	6	7
5	(United States) T Boyer	3	5

Second round
1	(Spain) C Taberner	2	6	6^{3}
(Switzerland) J Kym	6	3	7^{7}
WC	(Italy) M Cecchinato	6	6
(Netherlands) M Houkes	3	4
4	(Brazil) T Seyboth Wild	7	7^{7}
Q	(United States) T Kodat	5	6^{4}
Q	(Greece) S Sakellaridis	3	6	6
Q	(Tunisia) M Echargui	6	3	4

Quarterfinals
(Switzerland) J Kym	6	6
WC	(Italy) M Cecchinato	3	0
4	(Brazil) T Seyboth Wild	6	6^{5}	7^{7}
Q	(Greece) S Sakellaridis	3	7^{7}	6^{4}

Semifinals
(Switzerland) J Kym	7^{7}	6^{4}	4
4	(Brazil) T Seyboth Wild	6^{5}	7^{7}	6

=== Bottom half ===
First round
7	(Argentina) RA Burruchaga	2	4
Alt	(Spain) D Mérida	6	6
Alt	(Italy) F Cinà	7	1	6
(Croatia) M Poljičak	5	6	3
(Germany) P Zahraj	1	4
(Argentina) F Díaz Acosta	6	6
NG	(Croatia) M Dodig	3	2
3	(Argentina) JM Cerúndolo	6	6
6	(Argentina) TA Tirante	6	6
(Peru) I Buse	1	2
Q	(Italy) S Travaglia	7^{7}	6
(France) G Blancaneaux	6^{4}	4
(Italy) A Pellegrino	6	6
Q	(Greece) A Thanos	4	4
(Italy) F Arnaboldi	1	1
2	(Colombia) DE Galán	6	6

Second round
Alt	(Spain) D Mérida	0	1
Alt	(Italy) F Cinà	6	6
(Argentina) F Díaz Acosta	6^{1}	3
3	(Argentina) JM Cerúndolo	7^{7}	6
6	(Argentina) TA Tirante	6	6^{5}	6^{3}
Q	(Italy) S Travaglia	2	7^{7}	7^{7}
(Italy) A Pellegrino	6	7^{7}
2	(Colombia) DE Galán	2	6^{2}

Quarterfinals
Alt	(Italy) F Cinà	4	7^{10}	6
3	(Argentina) JM Cerúndolo	6	6^{8}	1
Q	(Italy) S Travaglia	6	6^{2}	6
(Italy) A Pellegrino	4	7^{7}	2

Semifinals
Alt	(Italy) F Cinà	6	3	4
Q	(Italy) S Travaglia	1	6	6
