= 2023 Modena Challenger – Singles =

Singles
- 2023 Modena Challenger

Final
- Champion: (United States) Emilio Nava
- Runner-up: (France) Titouan Droguet
- Score: 6–7^{(5–7)}, 7–6^{(8–6)}, 6–4

Events
Singles	Doubles
- Modena Challenger

This was the first edition of the tournament.

Emilio Nava won the title after defeating Titouan Droguet 6–7^{(5–7)}, 7–6^{(8–6)}, 6–4 in the final.

== Seeds ==
1. (Argentina) Federico Coria (quarterfinals)
2. (Brazil) Thiago Monteiro (second round)
3. (United States) Emilio Nava (champion)
4. (Czech Republic) Jakub Menšík (first round)
5. (France) Térence Atmane (quarterfinals)
6. (Argentina) Renzo Olivo (second round)
7. (Bosnia and Herzegovina) Nerman Fatić (semifinals)
8. (Italy) Gianluca Mager (first round)

== Draw ==
Key

- Q = Qualifier
- WC = Wild card
- LL = Lucky loser
- Alt = Alternate
- ITF = ITF entry
- PR = Protected ranking
- SR = Special ranking
- SE = Special exempt
- JE = Junior exempt
- JR = Junior Accelerator Programme entrant
- CO = College Accelerator Programme entrant
- NG = Next Gen Accelerator Program entrant
- w/o = Walkover
- r = Retired
- d = Defaulted

=== Finals ===
Semifinals
7	(Bosnia and Herzegovina) Nerman Fatić	3	6	4
(France) Titouan Droguet	6	3	6
3	(United States) Emilio Nava	6	6
Alt	(Tunisia) Moez Echargui	1	3

Final
(France) Titouan Droguet	7^{7}	6^{6}	4
3	(United States) Emilio Nava	6^{5}	7^{8}	6

=== Top half ===
First round
1/WC	(Argentina) F Coria	6	6
(Netherlands) M Houkes	4	2
Q	(Italy) J Ocleppo	4	6	0
(Italy) S Caruso	6	3	6
Q	(Germany) Lucas Gerch	6^{5}	4
(Mexico) R Pacheco Méndez	7^{7}	6
(Italy) L Giustino	6^{4}	2
7	(Bosnia and Herzegovina) N Fatić	7^{7}	6
4	(Czech Republic) J Menšík	7	6^{2}	4
(Italy) S Travaglia	5	7^{7}	6
(Belgium) G-A Bailly	4	5
Q	(Poland) M Kaśnikowski	6	7
(France) T Droguet	6	6
Alt	(Bolivia) M Dellien	4	3
Q	(Switzerland) R Bertola	7^{12}	6
8	(Italy) G Mager	6^{10}	3

Second round
1/WC	(Argentina) F Coria	6	6
(Italy) S Caruso	1	1
(Mexico) R Pacheco Méndez	4	2
7	(Bosnia and Herzegovina) N Fatić	6	6
(Italy) S Travaglia	2	6^{4}
Q	(Poland) M Kaśnikowski	6	7^{7}
(France) T Droguet	7^{7}	6
Q	(Switzerland) R Bertola	6^{2}	2

Quarterfinals
1/WC	(Argentina) F Coria	4	6	3
7	(Bosnia and Herzegovina) N Fatić	6	2	6
Q	(Poland) M Kaśnikowski	1	5
(France) T Droguet	6	7

Semifinals
7	(Bosnia and Herzegovina) N Fatić	3	6	4
(France) T Droguet	6	3	6

=== Bottom half ===
First round
6	(Argentina) R Olivo	7	6
(Italy) G Fonio	5	4
Alt	(Romania) FC Jianu	7^{7}	4	4
WC	(Italy) G Ferrari	6^{4}	6	6
Q	A Kachmazov	4	0
(Poland) D Michalski	6	6
(Germany) Elmar Ejupovic	7^{7}	4	3
3	(United States) Em Nava	6^{5}	6	6
5	(France) T Atmane	7^{7}	3	6
(Argentina) H Casanova	6^{4}	6	1
WC	(Italy) Marcello Serafini	2	6^{3}
Q	(Italy) F Forti	6	7^{7}
(United States) O Crawford	4	5
Alt	(Tunisia) M Echargui	6	7
(Spain) P Martín Tiffon	7^{7}	3	3
2	(Brazil) T Monteiro	6^{2}	6	6

Second round
6	(Argentina) R Olivo	3	4
WC	(Italy) G Ferrari	6	6
(Poland) D Michalski	2	2
3	(United States) Em Nava	6	6
5	(France) T Atmane	6	6
Q	(Italy) F Forti	3	4
Alt	(Tunisia) M Echargui	3	6	6
2	(Brazil) T Monteiro	6	1	2

Quarterfinals
WC	(Italy) G Ferrari	1	7^{7}	2
3	(United States) Em Nava	6	6^{5}	6
5	(France) T Atmane	6^{7}	6	2
Alt	(Tunisia) M Echargui	7^{9}	4	6

Semifinals
3	(United States) Em Nava	6	6
Alt	(Tunisia) M Echargui	1	3
