= 2019 Open Castilla y León =

- Date: 29 July – 4 August
- Edition: 34th (men); 5th (women)
- Category: ATP Challenger Tour; ITF Women's Circuit
- Surface: Hard
- Location: Segovia, Spain

Champions

Men's singles
- (Spain) Nicola Kuhn

Women's singles
- (Netherlands) Arantxa Rus

Men's doubles
- (Netherlands) Sander Arends / (Netherlands) David Pel

Women's doubles
- (Spain) Marina Bassols Ribera / (China) Feng Shuo
- Open Castilla y León

The 2019 Open Castilla y León Villa De El Espinar Segovia was a professional tennis tournament played on outdoor hard courts. It was the 34th edition, for men, and 5th edition, for women, of the tournament and part of the 2019 ATP Challenger Tour and the 2019 ITF Women's World Tennis Tour. It took place in El Espinar, Segovia, Spain, between 29 July – 4 August 2019.

== Men's singles main draw entrants ==
=== Seeds ===
Country	Player	Rank^{1}	Seed
SLO	Blaž Rola	161	1
NED	Tallon Griekspoor	191	2
FRA	Constant Lestienne	196	3
ITA	Andrea Arnaboldi	218	4
ESP	Nicola Kuhn	235	5
ITA	Matteo Viola	243	6
ITA	Luca Vanni	246	7
FRA	Kenny de Schepper	273	8
ESP	Roberto Ortega Olmedo	274	9
RUS	Pavel Kotov	287	10
ESP	Oriol Roca Batalla	315	11
NED	Scott Griekspoor	328	12
ITA	Andrea Vavassori	330	13
FRA	Baptiste Crepatte	332	14
UZB	Khumoyun Sultanov	343	15
BIH	Aldin Šetkić	348	16

- ^{1} Rankings as of 22 July 2019.

=== Other entrants ===
The following players received wildcards into the singles main draw:

- (Spain) Nicolás Álvarez Varona
- (Spain) Íñigo Cervantes
- (Spain) Miguel Damas
- (Spain) Mario González Fernández
- (India) Digvijaypratap Singh

The following player received entry into the singles main draw using a protected ranking:

- (Colombia) Nicolás Barrientos

The following players received entry into the singles main draw using their ITF World Tennis Ranking:

- (Sweden) Markus Eriksson
- (Russia) Konstantin Kravchuk
- (Brazil) Orlando Luz
- (Brazil) Felipe Meligeni Alves
- (Netherlands) Botic van de Zandschulp

The following players received entry from the qualifying draw:

- (Portugal) Fred Gil
- (Italy) Walter Trusendi

== Women's singles main draw entrants ==
=== Seeds ===
Country	Player	Rank^{1}	Seed
NED	Arantxa Rus	130	1
ESP	Cristina Bucșa	215	2
BUL	Elitsa Kostova	227	3
ESP	Nuria Párrizas Díaz	269	4
POL	Urszula Radwańska	271	5
ESP	Olga Sáez Larra	284	6
ESP	Eva Guerrero Álvarez	298	7
UKR	Olga Ianchuk	343	8

- ^{1} Rankings as of 22 July 2019.

=== Other entrants ===
The following players received wildcards into the singles main draw:

- (Spain) Ángela Díez Plágaro
- (Spain) Ángeles Moreno Barranquero
- (Spain) Olga Parres Azcoitia
- (Spain) Raquel Villán Pereira

The following players received entry into the singles main draw using their ITF World Tennis Ranking:

- (Spain) Alba Carrillo Marín
- (Bulgaria) Dia Evtimova
- (Russia) Daria Mishina
- (Spain) Júlia Payola

The following players received entry from the qualifying draw:

- (Spain) Ainhoa Atucha Gómez
- (Spain) Lucía Cortez Llorca
- (Argentina) Julieta Lara Estable
- (China) Feng Shuo
- (Argentina) Eugenia Ganga
- (Spain) Almudena Sanz Llaneza Fernández

== Champions ==
=== Men's singles ===
- (Spain) Nicola Kuhn def. (Russia) Pavel Kotov 6–2, 7–6^{(7–4)}.

=== Women's singles ===
- (Netherlands) Arantxa Rus def. (Bulgaria) Julia Terziyska, 6–4, 6–1

=== Men's doubles ===
- (Netherlands) Sander Arends / (Netherlands) David Pel def. (Brazil) Orlando Luz / (Brazil) Felipe Meligeni Alves 6–4, 7–6^{(7–3)}.

=== Women's doubles ===
- (Spain) Marina Bassols Ribera / (China) Feng Shuo def. (Australia) Alexandra Bozovic / (Belarus) Shalimar Talbi, 7–5, 7–6^{(7–4)}
