= 2026 Savannah Challenger =

- Date: 20 – 26 April
- Edition: 16th
- Surface: Green clay
- Location: Savannah, Georgia, United States

Champions

Singles
- (United States) Nishesh Basavareddy

Doubles
- (Canada) Cleeve Harper / (United Kingdom) David Stevenson
- Savannah Challenger

The 2026 Savannah Challenger was a professional tennis tournament played on clay courts. It was the 16th edition of the tournament which was part of the 2026 ATP Challenger Tour. It took place in Savannah, Georgia, United States between April 20 and April 26, 2026.

== Singles main-draw entrants ==
=== Seeds ===
Country	Player	Rank^{1}	Seed
CAN	Liam Draxl	157	1
USA	Nishesh Basavareddy	174	2
EST	Daniil Glinka	177	3
ARG	Federico Agustín Gómez	185	4
USA	Colton Smith	189	5
FRA	Clément Tabur	196	6
~~BRA~~	~~João Lucas Reis da Silva~~	~~211~~	~~7~~
ECU	Andy Andrade	217	8

- ^{1} Rankings are as of April 13, 2026.

=== Other entrants ===
The following players received wildcards into the singles main draw:

- (United States) Michael Antonius
- (Japan) Kei Nishikori
- (United States) Alex Rybakov

The following player received entry into the singles main draw using a protected ranking:

- (United States) J. J. Wolf

The following player received entry into the singles main draw through the College Accelerator programme:

- (United States) Stefan Dostanic

The following player received entry into the singles main draw through the Junior Accelerator programme:

- (United States) Jack Kennedy

The following player received entry into the singles main draw through the Next Gen Accelerator programme:

- (France) Thomas Faurel

The following players received entry into the singles main draw as alternates:

- (Czech Republic) Hynek Bartoň
- (Georgia (country)) Saba Purtseladze

The following players received entry from the qualifying draw:

- (Switzerland) Kilian Feldbausch
- (Dominican Republic) Nick Hardt
- (United States) Andrew Johnson
- (Argentina) Nicolás Kicker
- (United States) Aidan Mayo
- (United States) Tyler Zink

The following player received entry as a lucky loser:

- (United States) Braden Shick

== Champions ==
=== Singles ===
- (United States) Nishesh Basavareddy def. (United States) Jack Kennedy 6–3, 6–0.

=== Doubles ===
- (Canada) Cleeve Harper / (United Kingdom) David Stevenson def. (Venezuela) Luis David Martínez / (Colombia) Cristian Rodríguez 7–6^{(7–4)}, 6–2.
