= 2026 Savannah Challenger – Singles =

Singles
- 2026 Savannah Challenger

Final
- Champion: (United States) Nishesh Basavareddy
- Runner-up: (United States) Jack Kennedy
- Score: 6–3, 6–0

Events
Singles	Doubles
- Savannah Challenger

Nicolás Mejía was the defending champion but chose not to defend his title.

Nishesh Basavareddy won the title after defeating Jack Kennedy 6–3, 6–0 in the final.

== Seeds ==
1. (Canada) Liam Draxl (second round)
2. (United States) Nishesh Basavareddy (champion)
3. (Estonia) Daniil Glinka (first round)
4. (Argentina) Federico Agustín Gómez (first round, retired)
5. (United States) Colton Smith (first round)
6. (France) Clément Tabur (quarterfinals)
7. (Brazil) João Lucas Reis da Silva (withdrew)
8. (Ecuador) Andy Andrade (quarterfinals)

== Draw ==
Key

- Q = Qualifier
- WC = Wild card
- LL = Lucky loser
- Alt = Alternate
- ITF = ITF entry
- PR = Protected ranking
- SR = Special ranking
- SE = Special exempt
- JE = Junior exempt
- JR = Junior Accelerator Programme entrant
- CO = College Accelerator Programme entrant
- NG = Next Gen Accelerator Program entrant
- w/o = Walkover
- r = Retired
- d = Defaulted

=== Finals ===
Semifinals
Q	(Switzerland) Kilian Feldbausch	6^{2}	3
JR	(United States) Jack Kennedy	7^{7}	6
(Colombia) Daniel Elahi Galán	5	4
2	(United States) Nishesh Basavareddy	7	6

Final
JR	(United States) Jack Kennedy	3	0
2	(United States) Nishesh Basavareddy	6	6

=== Top half ===
First round
1	(Canada) L Draxl	6^{12}	6	7^{7}
(Brazil) P Boscardin Dias	7^{14}	4	6^{4}
WC	(United States) A Rybakov	4	1
Q	(Switzerland) K Feldbausch	6	6
PR	(United States) JJ Wolf	6	6
NG	(France) T Faurel	3	4
(United States) A Martin	4	6	3
6	(France) C Tabur	6	3	6
3	(Estonia) D Glinka	2	3
(United States) S Kozlov	6	6
Q	(Dominican Republic) N Hardt	6	6
Alt	(Georgia (country)) S Purtseladze	2	0
(France) S Gueymard Wayenburg	7	0	1
JR	(United States) J Kennedy	5	6	6
WC	(Japan) K Nishikori	6	6
5	(United States) C Smith	2	3

Second round
1	(Canada) L Draxl	1	0
Q	(Switzerland) K Feldbausch	6	6
PR	(United States) JJ Wolf	4	7^{7}	1
6	(France) C Tabur	6	6^{2}	6
(United States) S Kozlov	2	6	0
Q	(Dominican Republic) N Hardt	6	2	6
JR	(United States) J Kennedy	6	6^{3}	6
WC	(Japan) K Nishikori	3	7^{7}	0

Quarterfinals
Q	(Switzerland) K Feldbausch	3	6	7^{7}
6	(France) C Tabur	6	3	6^{4}
Q	(Dominican Republic) N Hardt	5	5
JR	(United States) J Kennedy	7	7

Semifinals
Q	(Switzerland) K Feldbausch	6^{2}	3
JR	(United States) J Kennedy	7^{7}	6

=== Bottom half ===
First round
Q	(United States) T Zink	3	5
LL	(United States) B Shick	6	7
WC	(United States) M Antonius	7^{7}	6^{4}	4
(United States) M Krueger	6^{3}	7^{7}	6
Alt	(Czech Republic) H Bartoň	6	5	4
(Colombia) DE Galán	2	7	6
CO	(United States) S Dostanic	6	2
4	(Argentina) FA Gómez	0	0^{r}
8	(Ecuador) A Andrade	6	6
(United Kingdom) O Crawford	4	4
Q	(Argentina) N Kicker	6^{3}	1
Q	(United States) A Mayo	7^{7}	6
(United States) M Mmoh	1	1^{r}
(Uruguay) F Roncadelli	6	3
Q	(United States) Andrew Johnson	2	6	5
2	(United States) N Basavareddy	6	4	7

Second round
LL	(United States) B Shick	2	7^{7}	2
(United States) M Krueger	6	6^{3}	6
(Colombia) DE Galán	6	4	6
CO	(United States) S Dostanic	3	6	3
8	(Ecuador) A Andrade	7^{7}	6
Q	(United States) A Mayo	6^{5}	4
(Uruguay) F Roncadelli	4	6^{4}
2	(United States) N Basavareddy	6	7^{7}

Quarterfinals
(United States) M Krueger	6^{3}	6^{2}
(Colombia) DE Galán	7^{7}	7^{7}
8	(Ecuador) A Andrade	3	2
2	(United States) N Basavareddy	6	6

Semifinals
(Colombia) DE Galán	5	4
2	(United States) N Basavareddy	7	6
