= 2021 São Paulo Challenger de Tênis – Doubles =

Doubles
- 2021 São Paulo Challenger de Tênis

Final
- Champions: (Colombia) Nicolás Barrientos (Colombia) Alejandro Gómez
- Runners-up: (Brazil) Rafael Matos (Brazil) Felipe Meligeni Alves
- Score: Walkover

Events
Singles	Doubles
- São Paulo Challenger de Tênis

Luis David Martínez and Felipe Meligeni Alves were the defending champions but chose to defend their title with different partners. Martínez partnered Fernando Romboli but lost in the semifinals to Nicolás Barrientos and Alejandro Gómez. Meligeni Alves partnered Rafael Matos but withdrew before the final due to a positive test for COVID-19.

Barrientos and Gómez won the title by walkover after Matos and Meligeni Alves withdrew before the final.

== Seeds ==
1. (Brazil) Rafael Matos / (Brazil) Felipe Meligeni Alves (final, withdrew)
2. (Venezuela) Luis David Martínez / (Brazil) Fernando Romboli (semifinals)
3. (United States) James Cerretani / (Switzerland) Luca Margaroli (first round)
4. (Colombia) Nicolás Barrientos / (Colombia) Alejandro Gómez (champions)

== Draw ==
Key

- Q = Qualifier
- WC = Wild card
- LL = Lucky loser
- Alt = Alternate
- ITF = ITF entry
- PR = Protected ranking
- SR = Special ranking
- SE = Special exempt
- JE = Junior exempt
- JR = Junior Accelerator Programme entrant
- CO = College Accelerator Programme entrant
- NG = Next Gen Accelerator Program entrant
- w/o = Walkover
- r = Retired
- d = Defaulted

First round
1	(Brazil) R Matos (Brazil) F Meligeni Alves	6	6
(Dominican Republic) R Cid Subervi (Argentina) A Collarini	4	2
WC	(Brazil) M Alves (Brazil) G Heide	3	7^{8}	[6]
(Brazil) O Luz (Brazil) I Marcondes	6	6^{6}	[10]
3	(United States) J Cerretani (Switzerland) L Margaroli	5	3
(Argentina) P Cachin (Uruguay) M Cuevas	7	6
WC	(Brazil) D Dutra da Silva (Brazil) P Sakamoto	4	6	[10]
(Colombia) A González (Brazil) T Seyboth Wild	6	3	[5]
PR	(Argentina) JP Ficovich (Argentina) Matías Zukas	7^{12}	3	[10]
(Slovenia) T Lipovšek Puches (Argentina) JI Londero	6^{10}	6	[3]
(Netherlands) M Vervoort (Bolivia) F Zeballos	7^{7}	4	[3]
4	(Colombia) N Barrientos (Colombia) A Gómez	6^{5}	6	[10]
Alt	(Italy) L Darderi (Switzerland) J Nikles	6	1	[10]
Alt	(Argentina) Facundo Juárez (Argentina) G Villanueva	2	6	[12]
WC	(Brazil) J Pereira (Brazil) Gabriel Roveri Sidney	1	6^{6}
2	(Venezuela) LD Martínez (Brazil) F Romboli	6	7^{8}

Quarterfinals
1	(Brazil) R Matos (Brazil) F Meligeni Alves	6	6
(Brazil) O Luz (Brazil) I Marcondes	3	2
(Argentina) P Cachin (Uruguay) M Cuevas	7^{7}	6
WC	(Brazil) D Dutra da Silva (Brazil) P Sakamoto	6^{3}	2
PR	(Argentina) JP Ficovich (Argentina) M Zukas	4	6^{3}
4	(Colombia) N Barrientos (Colombia) A Gómez	6	7^{7}
Alt	(Argentina) F Juárez (Argentina) G Villanueva	4	6^{4}
2	(Venezuela) LD Martínez (Brazil) F Romboli	6	7^{7}

Semifinals
1	(Brazil) R Matos (Brazil) F Meligeni Alves	6	6
(Argentina) P Cachin (Uruguay) M Cuevas	2	4
4	(Colombia) N Barrientos (Colombia) A Gómez	6	7
2	(Venezuela) LD Martínez (Brazil) F Romboli	4	5

Final
1	(Brazil) R Matos (Brazil) F Meligeni Alves
4	(Colombia) N Barrientos (Colombia) A Gómez	w/o
