= 2025 Modena Challenger =

- Date: 30 June – 6 July
- Edition: 3rd
- Surface: Clay
- Location: Modena, Italy

Champions

Singles
- (Italy) Stefano Travaglia

Doubles
- (Argentina) Federico Agustín Gómez / (Venezuela) Luis David Martínez
- Modena Challenger

The 2025 Modena Challenger was a professional tennis tournament played on clay courts. It was the third edition of the tournament which was part of the 2025 ATP Challenger Tour. It took place in Modena, Italy between 30 June and 6 July 2025.

== Singles main-draw entrants ==
=== Seeds ===
Country	Player	Rank^{1}	Seed
ESP	Carlos Taberner	100	1
COL	Daniel Elahi Galán	105	2
ARG	Juan Manuel Cerúndolo	111	3
BRA	Thiago Seyboth Wild	120	4
USA	Tristan Boyer	121	5
ARG	Thiago Agustín Tirante	122	6
ARG	Román Andrés Burruchaga	133	7
ARG	Federico Agustín Gómez	139	8

- ^{1} Rankings are as of 23 June 2025.

=== Other entrants ===
The following players received wildcards into the singles main draw:

- (Italy) Federico Bondioli
- (Italy) Marco Cecchinato
- (Italy) Luca Parenti

The following player received entry into the singles main draw through the Next Gen Accelerator programme:

- (Croatia) Matej Dodig

The following players received entry into the singles main draw as alternates:

- (Italy) Federico Cinà
- (Spain) Daniel Mérida

The following players received entry from the qualifying draw:

- (Spain) Max Alcalá Gurri
- (Tunisia) Moez Echargui
- (United States) Toby Kodat
- (Greece) Stefanos Sakellaridis
- (Greece) Aristotelis Thanos
- (Italy) Stefano Travaglia

== Champions ==
=== Singles ===
- (Italy) Stefano Travaglia def. (Brazil) Thiago Seyboth Wild 6–4, 6–3.

=== Doubles ===
- (Argentina) Federico Agustín Gómez / (Venezuela) Luis David Martínez def. (Denmark) Johannes Ingildsen / (Slovakia) Miloš Karol 7–5, 7–6^{(7–5)}.
