= 2021 São Paulo Challenger de Tênis =

- Date: 29 November – 5 December
- Edition: 7th
- Surface: Clay
- Location: São Paulo, Brazil

Champions

Singles
- (Argentina) Juan Pablo Ficovich

Doubles
- (Colombia) Nicolás Barrientos / (Colombia) Alejandro Gómez
| ← 2020 · | São Paulo Challenger de Tênis | · 2022 → |

The 2021 São Paulo Challenger de Tênis was a professional tennis tournament played on clay courts. It was the seventh edition of the tournament which was part of the 2021 ATP Challenger Tour. It took place in São Paulo, Brazil between 29 November and 5 December 2021.

== Singles main-draw entrants ==
=== Seeds ===
| Country | Player | Rank^{1} | Seed |
|---|---|---|---|
| ~~URU~~ | ~~Pablo Cuevas~~ | ~~98~~ | ~~1~~ |
| BOL | Hugo Dellien | 119 | 2 |
| BRA | Thiago Seyboth Wild | 132 | 3 |
| ARG | Juan Ignacio Londero | 144 | 4 |
| CHI | Nicolás Jarry | 160 | 5 |
| BRA | Felipe Meligeni Alves | 180 | 6 |
| ARG | Nicolás Kicker | 236 | 7 |
| ARG | Pedro Cachin | 258 | 8 |

- ^{1} Rankings as of 22 November 2021.

=== Other entrants ===
The following players received wildcards into the singles main draw:

- (Brazil) Mateus Alves
- (Brazil) Oscar José Gutierrez
- (Brazil) Gustavo Heide

The following players received entry into the singles main draw as alternates:

- (Brazil) Daniel Dutra da Silva
- (Colombia) Alejandro González
- (Argentina) Facundo Juárez
- (Brazil) Gilbert Klier Júnior

The following players received entry from the qualifying draw:

- (Italy) Luciano Darderi
- (Brazil) Igor Marcondes
- (Argentina) Gonzalo Villanueva
- (Argentina) Matías Zukas

The following player received entry as a lucky loser:

- (Colombia) Alejandro Gómez

== Champions ==
=== Singles ===
- (Argentina) Juan Pablo Ficovich def. (Italy) Luciano Darderi 6–3, 7–5.

=== Doubles ===
- (Colombia) Nicolás Barrientos / (Colombia) Alejandro Gómez def. (Brazil) Rafael Matos / (Brazil) Felipe Meligeni Alves Walkover.
