= 2020 Challenger Ciudad de Guayaquil – Doubles =

Doubles
- 2020 Challenger Ciudad de Guayaquil

Final
- Champions: (Venezuela) Luis David Martínez (Brazil) Felipe Meligeni Alves
- Runners-up: (Spain) Sergio Martos Gornés (Spain) Jaume Munar
- Score: 6–0, 4–6, [10–3]

Events
Singles	Doubles
- Challenger Ciudad de Guayaquil

Ariel Behar and Gonzalo Escobar were the defending champions but only Escobar chose to defend his title, partnering Diego Hidalgo. Escobar lost in the first round to Íñigo Cervantes and Oriol Roca Batalla.

Luis David Martínez and Felipe Meligeni Alves won the title after defeating Sergio Martos Gornés and Jaume Munar 6–0, 4–6, [10–3] in the final.

== Seeds ==
1. (Venezuela) Luis David Martínez / (Brazil) Felipe Meligeni Alves (champions)
2. (Ecuador) Gonzalo Escobar / (Ecuador) Diego Hidalgo (first round)
3. (Spain) Sergio Martos Gornés / (Spain) Jaume Munar (final)
4. (Brazil) Rafael Matos / (Brazil) João Menezes (semifinals)

== Draw ==
Key

- Q = Qualifier
- WC = Wild card
- LL = Lucky loser
- Alt = Alternate
- ITF = ITF entry
- PR = Protected ranking
- SR = Special ranking
- SE = Special exempt
- JE = Junior exempt
- JR = Junior Accelerator Programme entrant
- CO = College Accelerator Programme entrant
- NG = Next Gen Accelerator Program entrant
- w/o = Walkover
- r = Retired
- d = Defaulted

First round
1	(Venezuela) LD Martínez (Brazil) F Meligeni Alves	6	6
WC	(Sweden) C Lindell (Brazil) P Sakamoto	0	4
(Argentina) F Cerúndolo (Argentina) TM Etcheverry	6	6
WC	(Spain) R Ortega Olmedo (Ecuador) Alexander Zederbauer	3	4
4	(Brazil) R Matos (Brazil) J Menezes	3	6	[11]
(Spain) C Gómez-Herrera (Ecuador) R Quiroz	6	4	[9]
(Argentina) R Olivo (Brazil) F Romboli	3	3
(Netherlands) M Vervoort (Spain) M Vilella Martínez	6	6
WC	(Ecuador) Ángel Díaz Jalil (Ecuador) AC March	6	2	[5]
(Chile) MT Barrios Vera (Chile) A Tabilo	2	6	[10]
(Argentina) G Durán (Brazil) R Dutra Silva	3	1
3	(Spain) S Martos Gornés (Spain) J Munar	6	6
(Peru) A Merino (Peru) JP Varillas	5	7^{8}	[10]
(Peru) S Galdós (Argentina) F Mena	7	6^{6}	[4]
(Spain) Í Cervantes (Spain) O Roca Batalla	4	6	[10]
2	(Ecuador) G Escobar (Ecuador) D Hidalgo	6	4	[7]

Quarterfinals
1	(Venezuela) LD Martínez (Brazil) F Meligeni Alves	w/o
(Argentina) F Cerúndolo (Argentina) TM Etcheverry
4	(Brazil) R Matos (Brazil) J Menezes	6	7
(Netherlands) M Vervoort (Spain) M Vilella Martínez	1	5
(Chile) MT Barrios Vera (Chile) A Tabilo	2	1
3	(Spain) S Martos Gornés (Spain) J Munar	6	6
(Peru) A Merino (Peru) JP Varillas	7^{7}	3	[4]
(Spain) Í Cervantes (Spain) O Roca Batalla	6^{4}	6	[10]

Semifinals
1	(Venezuela) LD Martínez (Brazil) F Meligeni Alves	3	6	[10]
4	(Brazil) R Matos (Brazil) J Menezes	6	3	[5]
3	(Spain) S Martos Gornés (Spain) J Munar	6	6
(Spain) Í Cervantes (Spain) O Roca Batalla	4	3

Final
1	(Venezuela) LD Martínez (Brazil) F Meligeni Alves	6	4	[10]
3	(Spain) S Martos Gornés (Spain) J Munar	0	6	[3]
