= 2020 São Paulo Challenger de Tênis – Singles =

Singles
- 2020 São Paulo Challenger de Tênis

Final
- Champion: (Brazil) Felipe Meligeni Alves
- Runner-up: (Portugal) Frederico Ferreira Silva
- Score: 6–2, 7–6^{(7–1)}

Events
Singles	Doubles
- São Paulo Challenger de Tênis

This was the first edition of the tournament.

It was originally scheduled to take place in Florianópolis (hardcourt) but was relocated to São Paulo (clay court) and took the São Paulo Challenger de Tênis namesake after restrictions in Santa Catarina state due to the COVID-19 pandemic.

Felipe Meligeni Alves won the title after defeating Frederico Ferreira Silva 6–2, 7–6^{(7–1)} in the final.

== Seeds ==
1. (Brazil) Thiago Monteiro (second round)
2. (Brazil) Thiago Seyboth Wild (first round)
3. (Egypt) Mohamed Safwat (second round)
4. (Ecuador) Emilio Gómez (first round)
5. (Kazakhstan) Dmitry Popko (quarterfinals)
6. (Portugal) Frederico Ferreira Silva (final)
7. (Brazil) João Menezes (semifinals)
8. (Argentina) Juan Pablo Ficovich (second round)

== Draw ==
Key

- Q = Qualifier
- WC = Wild card
- LL = Lucky loser
- Alt = Alternate
- ITF = ITF entry
- PR = Protected ranking
- SR = Special ranking
- SE = Special exempt
- JE = Junior exempt
- JR = Junior Accelerator Programme entrant
- CO = College Accelerator Programme entrant
- NG = Next Gen Accelerator Program entrant
- w/o = Walkover
- r = Retired
- d = Defaulted

=== Finals ===
Semifinals
(Brazil) Pedro Sakamoto	2	4
(Brazil) Felipe Meligeni Alves	6	6
6	(Portugal) Frederico Ferreira Silva	6	6
7	(Brazil) João Menezes	4	3

Final
(Brazil) Felipe Meligeni Alves	6	7^{7}
6	(Portugal) Frederico Ferreira Silva	2	6^{1}

=== Top half ===
First round
1	(Brazil) T Monteiro	6	6
WC	(Portugal) G Elias	3	2
(Spain) R Ortega Olmedo	7	5	2
(France) M Janvier	5	7	6
(Brazil) P Sakamoto	6	6^{7}	7
WC	(Brazil) I Marcondes	1	7^{9}	5
Q	(Colombia) A González	3	6^{4}
8	(Argentina) JP Ficovich	6	7^{7}
3	(Egypt) M Safwat	6	3	3
(France) M Guinard	2	6	0^{r}
(Brazil) F Meligeni Alves	6	6
LL	(Zimbabwe) B Lock	4	1
(Argentina) F Argüello	7^{7}	3	1
(Ecuador) R Quiroz	6^{0}	6	6
(Spain) C Gómez-Herrera	3	6	1
5	(Kazakhstan) D Popko	6	3	6

Second round
1	(Brazil) T Monteiro	6^{5}	7^{7}	4
(France) M Janvier	7^{7}	6^{4}	6
(Brazil) P Sakamoto	7^{7}	7
8	(Argentina) JP Ficovich	6^{4}	5
3	(Egypt) M Safwat	3	6^{7}
(Brazil) F Meligeni Alves	6	7^{9}
(Ecuador) R Quiroz	1	1
5	(Kazakhstan) D Popko	6	6

Quarterfinals
(France) M Janvier	2	6	1
(Brazil) P Sakamoto	6	3	6
(Brazil) F Meligeni Alves	2	6	6
5	(Kazakhstan) D Popko	6	3	3

Semifinals
(Brazil) P Sakamoto	2	4
(Brazil) F Meligeni Alves	6	6

=== Bottom half ===
First round
6	(Portugal) F Ferreira Silva	4	7^{7}	6
Alt	(Tunisia) A Dougaz	6	6^{5}	1
(Brazil) T Bellucci	6	6
(Russia) T Gabashvili	2	0
(Sweden) C Lindell	6	4	6
Q	(Brazil) JL Reis da Silva	2	6	3
Q	(Argentina) C Ugo Carabelli	5	6	6
4	(Ecuador) E Gómez	7	3	0
7	(Brazil) J Menezes	6	6
WC	(Brazil) JP Sorgi	1	1
(Argentina) S Báez	3	6	4
(Chinese Taipei) C-h Tseng	6	3	6
Q	(Brazil) M Pucinelli de Almeida	6	5	6
(Japan) K Uchida	2	7	3
(Brazil) O Luz	7	1	6
2	(Brazil) T Seyboth Wild	5	6	3

Second round
6	(Portugal) F Ferreira Silva	6	6
(Brazil) T Bellucci	3	1
(Sweden) C Lindell	2	3
Q	(Argentina) C Ugo Carabelli	6	6
7	(Brazil) J Menezes	6	6
(Chinese Taipei) C-h Tseng	3	3
Q	(Brazil) M Pucinelli de Almeida	6	2	6
(Brazil) O Luz	4	6	3

Quarterfinals
6	(Portugal) F Ferreira Silva	7	6
Q	(Argentina) C Ugo Carabelli	5	2
7	(Brazil) J Menezes	6	6
Q	(Brazil) M Pucinelli de Almeida	2	2

Semifinals
6	(Portugal) F Ferreira Silva	6	6
7	(Brazil) J Menezes	4	3
