= 2024 Modena Challenger =

- Date: 1 – 6 July
- Edition: 2nd
- Surface: Clay
- Location: Modena, Italy

Champions

Singles
- (Spain) Albert Ramos Viñolas

Doubles
- (France) Jonathan Eysseric / (United States) George Goldhoff
- Modena Challenger

The 2024 Modena Challenger was a professional tennis tournament played on clay courts. It was the second edition of the tournament which was part of the 2024 ATP Challenger Tour. It took place in Modena, Italy between 1 and 6 July 2024.

== Singles main-draw entrants ==
=== Seeds ===
Country	Player	Rank^{1}	Seed
ESP	Albert Ramos Viñolas	112	1
ARG	Thiago Agustín Tirante	128	2
FRA	Titouan Droguet	133	3
~~ITA~~	~~Matteo Gigante~~	~~135~~	~~4~~
ITA	Andrea Pellegrino	158	5
FRA	Benoît Paire	159	6
PER	Juan Pablo Varillas	162	7
ESP	Oriol Roca Batalla	164	8
TPE	Tseng Chun-hsin	168	9

- ^{1} Rankings are as of 24 June 2024.

=== Other entrants ===
The following players received wildcards into the singles main draw:

- (Italy) Federico Arnaboldi
- (Italy) Jacopo Berrettini
- (Italy) Gabriele Piraino

The following players received entry into the singles main draw as alternates:

- (Switzerland) Rémy Bertola
- (Italy) Raúl Brancaccio
- (Italy) Giovanni Fonio
- (Italy) Francesco Forti
- (Italy) Alessandro Giannessi

The following players received entry from the qualifying draw:

- (Italy) Marco Cecchinato
- (Italy) Federico Gaio
- (Denmark) August Holmgren
- (Spain) Daniel Mérida
- (Italy) Alessandro Pecci
- (Italy) Mariano Tammaro

The following player received entry as a lucky loser:

- (Italy) Marcello Serafini

== Champions ==
=== Singles ===
- (Spain) Albert Ramos Viñolas def. (Italy) Federico Arnaboldi 6–4, 3–6, 6–2.

=== Doubles ===
- (France) Jonathan Eysseric / (United States) George Goldhoff def. (Germany) Andre Begemann / (Finland) Patrik Niklas-Salminen 6–3, 3–6, [10–8].
