= Felipe Meligeni Alves =

Brazilian tennis player

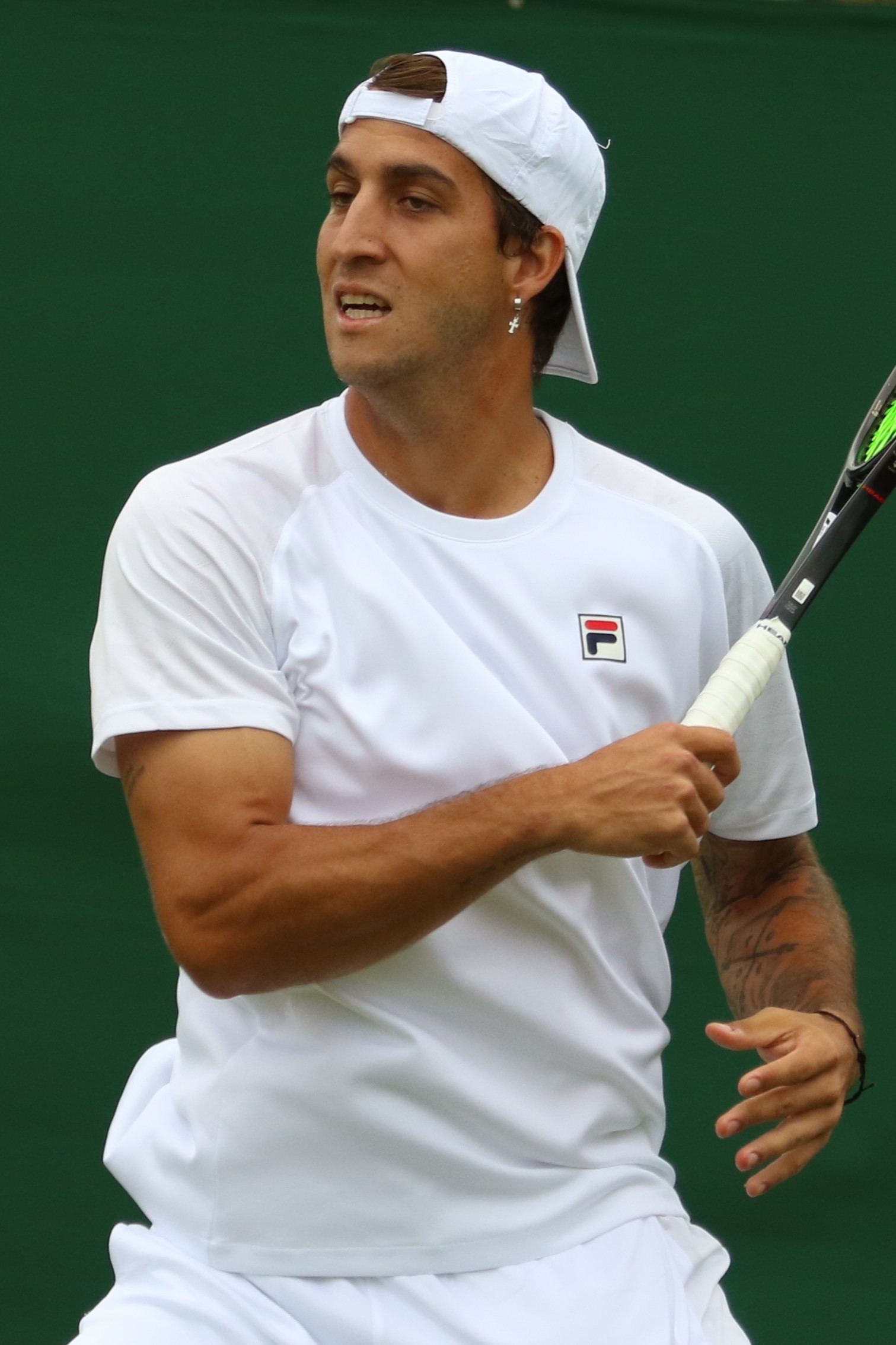
- Meligeni Alves at the 2023 Wimbledon Championships
- Full name: Felipe Meligeni Rodrigues Alves
- Country (sports): Brazil
- Residence: Campinas, Brazil
- Born: 19 February 1998 (age 28) Campinas, Brazil
- Height: 1.85 m (6 ft 1 in)
- Turned pro: 2016
- Plays: Right-handed (two-handed backhand)
- Coach: Cesar Chiappari, Franco Ferreiro
- Prize money: US $1,438,691

Singles
- Career record: 5–13
- Career titles: 0
- Highest ranking: No. 117 (21 April 2025)
- Current ranking: No. 465 (31 August 2026)

Grand Slam singles results
- Australian Open: Q2 (2021, 2024)
- French Open: 1R (2024)
- Wimbledon: 1R (2024)
- US Open: 2R (2023)

Doubles
- Career record: 17–12
- Career titles: 2
- Highest ranking: No. 75 (20 June 2022)
- Current ranking: No. 369 (31 August 2026)

Grand Slam doubles results
- Australian Open: 1R (2022)
- French Open: 1R (2022)

Team competitions
- Davis Cup: 3–2
- Last updated on: 1 September 2026.

Felipe Meligeni Rodrigues Alves (born 19 February 1998) is a Brazilian professional tennis player. He has a career-high ATP singles ranking of world No. 117 achieved on 21 April 2025 and a doubles ranking of No. 75 achieved on 20 June 2022.

== Career ==
=== 2016: Juniors ===
Meligeni Alves won the 2016 US Open boys' doubles title, partnering Juan Carlos Aguilar.

=== 2020: ATP debut, Maiden Challenger singles and doubles titles ===
In January 2020, he reached the semifinals of the Punta del Este Challenger.

Meligeni made his debut in an ATP Tour singles main draw as wildcard at the 2020 Rio Open, losing in three sets to world No. 4 Dominic Thiem in the first round.

Meligeni won his first ATP Challenger doubles title at Guayaquil alongside Venezuelan Luis David Martínez, defeating Spaniards Sergio Martos Gornés and Jaume Munar in the final.

Meligeni Alves won his first ATP Challenger singles title at São Paulo, defeating Portuguese Frederico Ferreira Silva, on 29 November 2020. He also won his second doubles title alongside Luis David Martínez in the same event.

=== 2021: First ATP title and top 100 debut in doubles ===
In March 2021, Meligeni Alves won his first ATP 250 doubles title alongside Rafael Matos at the 2021 Córdoba Open defeating Romain Arneodo and Benoît Paire. He reached the top 100 on 14 June 2021 at world No. 99 in doubles.

In March, he reached the semifinals of the Santiago Challenger. In June he reaches the semi of the Challenger in Biella, and in July, in the Iasi Challenger semi. He reached the final of the Santiago Challenger in October, losing in the final to Sebastián Báez. He even reached the semi-final of the Challenger in São Paulo.

=== 2022: Top 150 in singles, Major debut & Second ATP title & top 75 in doubles ===
In doubles, he made his Grand Slam debut partnering Rafael Matos at the 2022 Australian Open. In February 2022, Meligeni Alves won his second ATP 250 doubles title at the 2022 Chile Open alongside Matos.

In singles, he reached the top 150 at No. 144 on 18 July 2022 following his second Challenger title at the 2022 Iași Open in Romania and a career-high singles ranking of No. 137 on 25 July 2022.

In April 2022, he reached the semifinals at Challenger in Mexico. In June, went to the Buenos Aires Challenger semi. He was champion of the Challenger in Iasi, Romania, in July. He also reached the semifinals of the São Leopoldo Challenger in November.

He finished the year ranked at No. 149 in singles on 21 November 2022.

=== 2023: Masters and Grand Slam debuts ===
He entered the main draw of a Masters 1000 for the first time, at the 2023 Miami Masters 1000. In May he went to the semifinals of the Challenger of Oeiras. He reached the best ranking of his career, 129 in the world, when he became champion of the Lyon Challenger in June. Reached the 2nd round of the 2023 US Open. In November, he reached the semifinals of the Challenger in Guayaquil.

=== 2024: Roland Garros and Wimbledon debuts ===
Meligeni reached the round of 16 at the ATP 500 in Rio de Janeiro, after passing through the qualifiers. In March, he reached the semifinals of the São Leopoldo Challenger. At Challenger 175 in Turin, Meligeni skipped the qualifiers, and then won the first two matches of the main draw, reaching the quarterfinals.

He qualified for the main draw of the 2024 French Open making his debut at this Major. He lost to seventh seed Casper Ruud in the first round in straight sets. Ranked No. 147, he qualified for the 2024 Wimbledon Championships making also his debut.

== Personal life ==
Meligeni Alves is of Argentine descent through his mother. Meligeni Alves' older sister Carolina Meligeni Alves is also a tennis player and their uncle, Fernando Meligeni, was also a tennis player who reached the semifinals at the 1999 French Open and 4th place at the 1996 Olympic Summer Games.

== ATP Tour finals ==
=== Doubles: 2 (2 titles) ===
Legend Grand Slam (–) ATP 1000 (–) ATP 500 (–) ATP 250 (2–0)	Finals by surface Hard (–) Clay (2–0) Grass (–)	Finals by setting Outdoor (2–0) Indoor (–)

Result	W–L	Date	Tournament	Tier	Surface	Partner	Opponents	Score
Win	1–0	Feb 2021	Córdoba Open, Argentina	ATP 250	Clay	(Brazil) Rafael Matos	(Monaco) Romain Arneodo (France) Benoît Paire	6–4, 6–1
Win	2–0	Feb 2022	Chile Open, Chile	ATP 250	Clay	(Brazil) Rafael Matos	(Sweden) Andre Goransson (United States) Nathaniel Lammons	7–6^{(10–8)}, 7–6^{(7–3)}

== ATP Challenger and ITF Tour finals ==
=== Singles: 17 (11 titles, 6 runner-ups) ===
Legend ATP Challenger Tour (5–2) ITF Futures/WTT (6–4)	Finals by surface Hard (1–0) Clay (10–6)

Result	W–L	Date	Tournament	Tier	Surface	Opponent	Score
Win	1–0	Nov 2020	São Paulo Challenger, Brazil	Challenger	Clay	(Portugal) Frederico Ferreira Silva	6–2, 7–6^{(7–1)}
Loss	1–1	Oct 2021	Challenger de Santiago III, Chile	Challenger	Clay	(Argentina) Sebastián Báez	6–3, 6–7^{(6–8)}, 1–6
Win	2–1	Jul 2022	Iași Open, Romania	Challenger	Clay	(Spain) Pablo Andújar	6–3, 4–6, 6–2
Win	3–1	Jun 2023	Open Sopra Steria, France	Challenger	Clay	(Switzerland) Alexander Ritschard	6–4, 0–6, 7–6^{(9–7)}
Loss	3–2	Oct 2024	Curitiba Challenger, Brazil	Challenger	Clay	(Portugal) Jaime Faria	4–6, 4–6
Win	4–2	Mar 2025	Yucatán Open, Mexico	Challenger	Clay	(Argentina) Juan Pablo Ficovich	6–2, 1–6, 6–2
Win	5–2	Apr 2025	Mexico City Open, Mexico	Challenger	Clay	(France) Luka Pavlovic	6–3, 6–3
Win	1–0	May 2018	F17 Cairo, Egypt	Futures	Clay	(Brazil) Orlando Luz	7–6^{(7–3)}, 7–6^{(7–3)}
Loss	1–1	Oct 2018	F6 Curitiba, Brazil	Futures	Clay	(Argentina) Francisco Cerúndolo	6–7^{(3–7)}, 2–6
Loss	1–2	Nov 2018	F7 São Carlos, Brazil	Futures	Clay	(Brazil) João Souza	3–6, 3–6
Win	2–2	Feb 2019	M15 Monastir, Tunisia	WTT	Hard	(United Kingdom) Evan Hoyt	6–4, 6–3
Win	3–2	Mar 2019	M15 Antalya, Turkey	WTT	Clay	(Russia) Ivan Nedelko	6–7^{(5–7)}, 7–5 ret.
Win	4–2	Apr 2019	M15 Antalya, Turkey	WTT	Clay	(Belgium) Clement Geens	6–3, 1–0 ret.
Loss	4–3	May 2019	M15 Las Palmas, Spain	WTT	Clay	(Spain) Eduard Esteve Lobato	2–6, 3–6
Loss	4–4	May 2019	M15 Las Palmas, Spain	WTT	Clay	(Spain) Eduard Esteve Lobato	4–6, 1–6
Win	5–4	Jul 2026	M25 São Paulo, Brazil	WTT	Clay	(Brazil) Paulo André Saraiva dos Santos	6–4, 6–3
Win	6–4	Aug 2026	M25 Londrina, Brazil	WTT	Clay	(Brazil) Paulo André Saraiva dos Santos	6–3, 7–5

=== Doubles: 21 (8 titles, 13 runner-ups) ===
Legend ATP Challenger Tour (8–13) ITF Futures/WTT (20+)	Finals by surface Hard (–) Clay (8–13)

Result	W–L	Date	Tournament	Tier	Surface	Partner	Opponents	Score
Loss	0–1	Aug 2019	Open Castilla y León, Spain	Challenger	Clay	(Brazil) Orlando Luz	(Netherlands) Sander Arends (Netherlands) David Pel	4–6, 6–7^{(3–7)}
Loss	0–2	Oct 2019	Lima Challenger, Peru	Challenger	Clay	(Venezuela) Luis David Martínez	(Uruguay) Ariel Behar (Ecuador) Gonzalo Escobar	2–6, 6–2, [3–10]
Win	1–2	Nov 2020	Challenger Ciudad de Guayaquil, Ecuador	Challenger	Clay	(Venezuela) Luis David Martínez	(Spain) Sergio Martos Gornés (Spain) Jaume Munar	6–0, 4–6, [10–3]
Win	2–2	Nov 2020	São Paulo Challenger, Brazil	Challenger	Clay	(Venezuela) Luis David Martínez	(Brazil) Rogério Dutra Silva (Brazil) Fernando Romboli	6–3, 6–3
Loss	2–3	Dec 2020	Campeonato Internacional, Brazil	Challenger	Clay	(Venezuela) Luis David Martínez	(France) Sadio Doumbia (France) Fabien Reboul	7–6^{(9–7)}, 5–7, [7–10]
Loss	2–4	Mar 2021	Challenger de Santiago, Chile	Challenger	Clay	(Brazil) Rafael Matos	(Venezuela) Luis David Martínez (Portugal) Gonçalo Oliveira	5–7, 1–6
Loss	2–5	May 2021	Biella Challenger V, Italy	Challenger	Clay	(Brazil) Rafael Matos	(Sweden) Andre Goransson (United States) Nathaniel Lammons	6–7^{(3–7)}, 3–6
Win	3–5	Jul 2021	Iași Open, Romania	Challenger	Clay	(Brazil) Orlando Luz	(Argentina) Hernán Casanova (Spain) Roberto Ortega Olmedo	6–3, 6–4
Loss	3–6	Jul 2021	Tampere Open, Finland	Challenger	Clay	(Brazil) Orlando Luz	(Argentina) Pedro Cachín (Argentina) Facundo Mena	5–7, 3–6
Win	4–6	Jul 2021	Trieste Challenger, Italy	Challenger	Clay	(Brazil) Orlando Luz	(France) Antoine Hoang (France) Albano Olivetti	7–5, 6–7^{(6–8)}, [10–5]
Win	5–6	Aug 2021	Como Challenger, Italy	Challenger	Clay	(Brazil) Rafael Matos	(Venezuela) Luis David Martínez (Italy) Andrea Vavassori	6–7^{(2–7)}, 6–4, [10–6]
Loss	5–7	Sep 2021	NÖ Open, Austria	Challenger	Clay	(Brazil) Rafael Matos	(Germany) Dustin Brown (Italy) Andrea Vavassori	6–7^{(5–7)}, 1–6
Win	6–7	Nov 2021	Uruguay Open, Uruguay	Challenger	Clay	(Brazil) Rafael Matos	(Uruguay) Ignacio Carou (Italy) Luciano Darderi	6–4, 6–4
Win	7–7	Nov 2021	Campinas International, Brazil	Challenger	Clay	(Brazil) Rafael Matos	(Brazil) Gilbert Klier Jr. (Brazil) Matheus Pucinelli de Almeida	6–3, 6–1
Loss	7–8	Nov 2021	São Paulo Challenger, Brazil	Challenger	Clay	(Brazil) Rafael Matos	(Colombia) Nicolás Barrientos (Colombia) Alejandro Gómez	walkover
Loss	7–9	Apr 2022	San Luis Open, Mexico	Challenger	Clay	(Venezuela) Luis David Martínez	(Colombia) Nicolás Barrientos (Mexico) Miguel Ángel Reyes-Varela	6–7^{(11–13)}, 2–6
Win	8–9	Apr 2022	Challenger de Tigre II, Argentina	Challenger	Clay	(Argentina) Guillermo Durán	(Italy) Luciano Darderi (Argentina) Juan Bautista Torres	3–6, 6–4, [10–3]
Loss	8–10	May 2022	Salvador Challenger, Brazil	Challenger	Clay	(Brazil) Orlando Luz	(Ecuador) Diego Hidalgo (Colombia) Cristian Rodríguez	5–7, 1–6
Loss	8–11	Nov 2022	São Léo Open, Brazil	Challenger	Clay	(Brazil) João Lucas Reis da Silva	(Argentina) Guido Andreozzi (Argentina) Guillermo Durán	1–5 ret.
Loss	8–12	Sep 2024	Buenos Aires Challenger, Argentina	Challenger	Clay	(Brazil) Marcelo Zormann	(Bolivia) Murkel Dellien (Argentina) Facundo Mena	6–1, 2–6, [10–12]
Loss	8–13	Mar 2026	LA Open, Brazil	Challenger	Clay	(Brazil) João Lucas Reis da Silva	(Brazil) Gustavo Heide (Brazil) Guto Miguel	4–6, 2–6

== National representation ==
=== Davis Cup ===
Meligeni Alves was first nominated to play for Brazil in Davis Cup in September 2021 against Lebanon. Meligeni Alves made his debut in Davis Cup against Hady Habib and won in straight sets in the second rubber which after allowed the Brazilian team to confirm the 4–0 tie and advance into the 2022 Davis Cup qualifying round. Currently, Meligeni Alves sports a 3–2 record in Davis Cup matches.

All Davis Cup Matches: 1–0 (Singles: 1–0)
2020 Davis Cup World Group I
Round	Date	Opponent	Final match score	Location	Surface	Match	Opponent	Rubber Score
WGI	September 18–19, 2021	Lebanon	2–0	Jounieh	Clay	Singles 4	Hady Habib	6–1, 6–3

=== United Cup ===
He represented Brazil at the 2023 United Cup as the No. 2 player.

== Junior Grand Slam finals ==
=== Doubles: 1 (title) ===
Result	Year	Tournament	Surface	Partner	Opponents	Score
Win	2016	US Open	Hard	(Bolivia) Juan Carlos Aguilar	(Canada) Félix Auger-Aliassime (Canada) Benjamin Sigouin	6–3, 7–6^{(7–4)}
