= George Goldhoff =

American tennis player (born 1995)

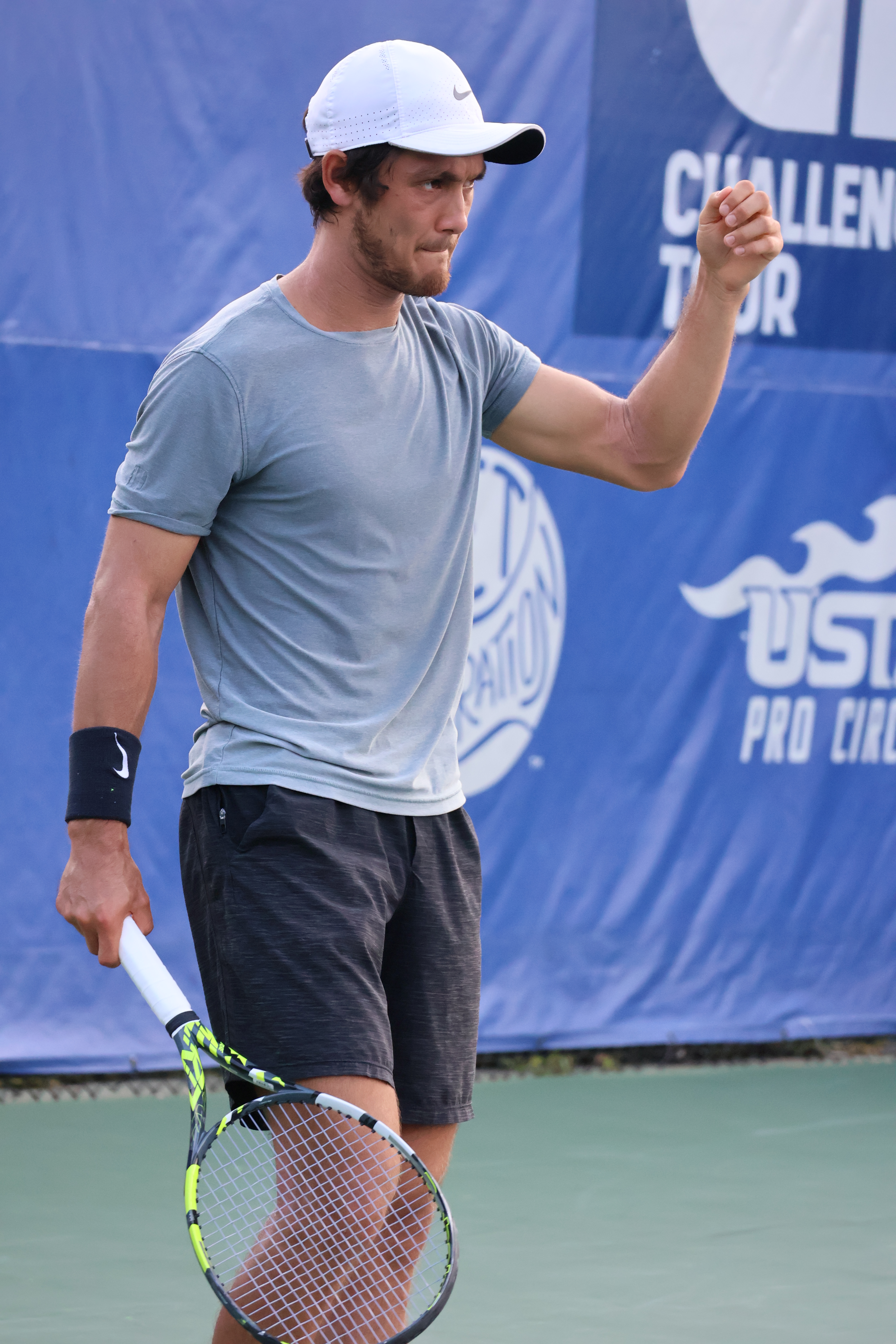
- Goldhoff in 2023
- Country (sports): United States
- Born: January 14, 1995 (age 31)
- Height: 1.85 m (6 ft 1 in)
- Plays: Right-handed (two-handed backhand)
- College: Texas
- Prize money: US $128,070

Singles
- Highest ranking: No. 1,214 (September 16, 2019)

Doubles
- Career record: 1–4
- Career titles: 5 Challenger, 17 ITF
- Highest ranking: No. 100 (June 15, 2026)
- Current ranking: No. 100 (June 15, 2026)

Grand Slam doubles results
- US Open: 1R (2025)
- Last updated on: June 15, 2026.

George Goldhoff (born January 14, 1995) is an American tennis player who specializes in doubles. He has a career high ATP doubles ranking of No. 100 achieved on June 15, 2026. He has won five ATP Challenger doubles titles in his career.

Goldhoff graduated from the University of Texas at Austin in 2017 with a degree in physical culture and sports. As a freshman playing for the Texas Longhorns, he was named the 2014 Intercollegiate Tennis Association Texas Region Rookie Player of the Year after compiling a 26–16 singles record. He also reached the quarterfinals of the 2013 ITA All-American Championships, defeating the nation's top-ranked collegiate player, Mikelis Libietis, during the tournament.

== Career ==
He won his first two ATP Challenger titles at the 2024 Cleveland Open and at the 2024 Challenger La Manche in Cherbourg, France with James Trotter. Following a third Challenger title in Modena, Italy partnering Jonathan Eysseric he reached the top 150 in the rankings on 15 July 2024.
