= Modena Challenger =

Tennis tournament held in Modena, Italy

- 2024 Modena Challenger

ATP Challenger Tour
- Event name: Modena Challenger
- Location: Modena, Italy
- Venue: Club La Meridiana
- Category: ATP Challenger Tour
- Surface: Clay
- Website: Website

The Modena Challenger is a professional tennis tournament played on clay courts. It is currently part of the ATP Challenger Tour. It was first held in Modena, Italy in 2023.

== Past finals ==
=== Singles ===
Year	Champion	Runner-up	Score
2025	(Italy) Stefano Travaglia	(Brazil) Thiago Seyboth Wild	6–4, 6–3
2024	(Spain) Albert Ramos Viñolas	(Italy) Federico Arnaboldi	6–4, 3–6, 6–2
2023	(United States) Emilio Nava	(France) Titouan Droguet	6–7^{(5–7)}, 7–6^{(8–6)}, 6–4

=== Doubles ===
Year	Champions	Runners-up	Score
2025	(Argentina) Federico Agustín Gómez (Venezuela) Luis David Martínez	(Denmark) Johannes Ingildsen (Slovakia) Miloš Karol	7–5, 7–6^{(7–5)}
2024	(France) Jonathan Eysseric (United States) George Goldhoff	(Germany) Andre Begemann (Finland) Patrik Niklas-Salminen	6–3, 3–6, [10–8]
2023	(United States) William Blumberg (Venezuela) Luis David Martínez	(Czech Republic) Roman Jebavý (Ukraine) Vladyslav Manafov	6–4, 6–4
