= Luis David Martínez =

Venezuelan tennis player (born 1989)

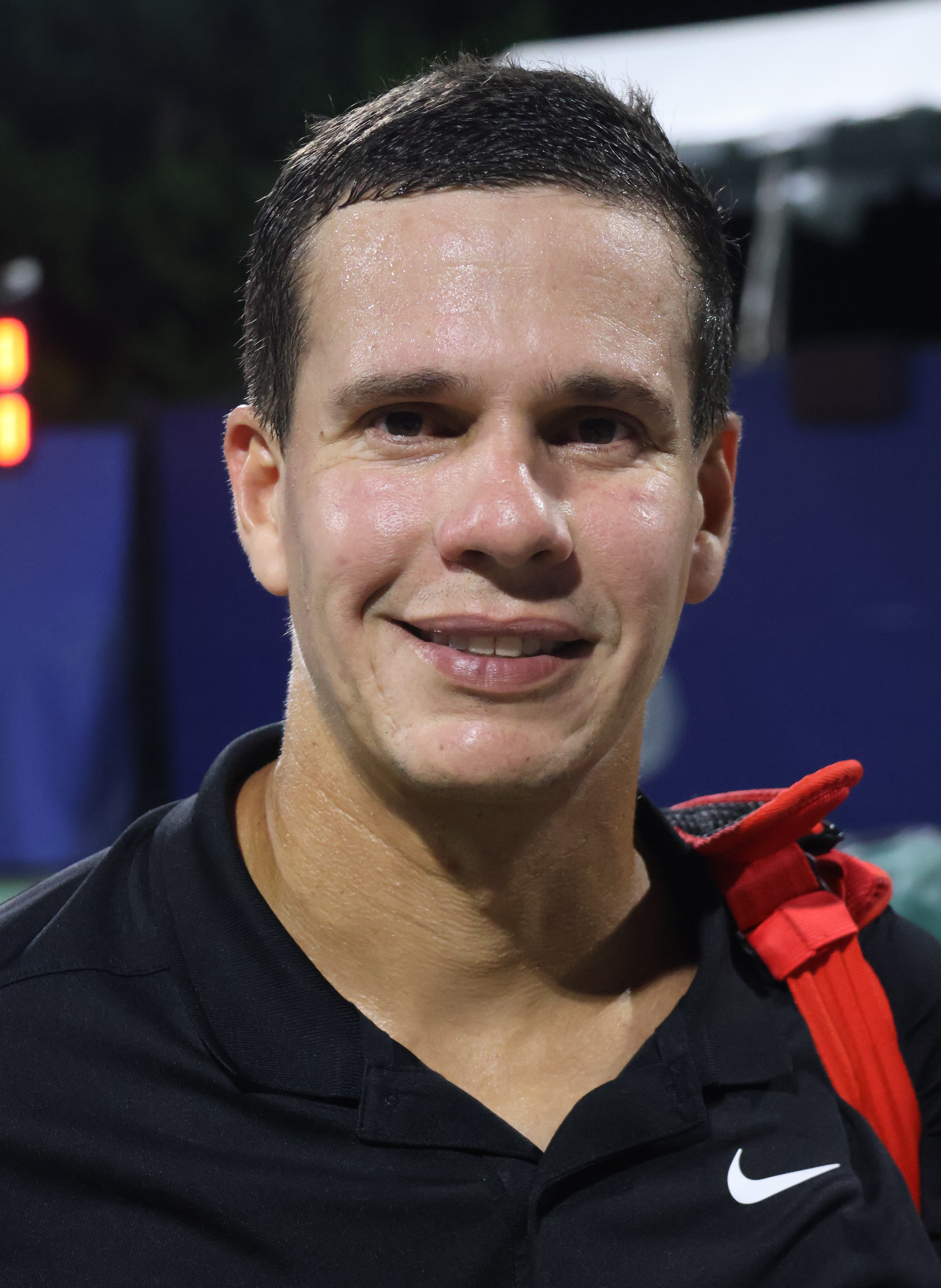
- Martínez at the 2023 Cary Challenger II
- Country (sports): Venezuela
- Residence: Lara, Venezuela
- Born: 12 May 1989 (age 37) Lara, Venezuela
- Plays: Right-handed (two handed-backhand)
- Prize money: $375,622

Singles
- Career record: 8–10 (at ATP Tour level, Grand Slam level, and in Davis Cup)
- Highest ranking: No. 390 (10 February 2014)
- Current ranking: No. 1,140 (30 March 2026)

Doubles
- Career record: 26–35 (at ATP Tour level, Grand Slam level, and in Davis Cup)
- Career titles: 18 Challenger, 21 Futures
- Highest ranking: No. 85 (3 July 2023)
- Current ranking: No. 118 (30 March 2026)

Grand Slam doubles results
- Australian Open: 1R (2023)
- French Open: 2R (2023)
- US Open: 1R (2023)

Team competitions
- Davis Cup: 23–16
- Last updated on: 30 March 2026.

Luis David Martínez (Latin American Spanish: [ˈlwis ðaˈβið maɾˈtines]; (Note: In isolation, David is pronounced [daˈβið].) born 12 May 1989 in Lara) is a Venezuelan tennis player who specializes in doubles. He has a career-high ATP doubles ranking of world No. 85 achieved on 3 July 2023 and a career-high singles ranking of No. 390 achieved on 10 February 2014. He is currently the No. 3 Venezuelan player.

Martínez has represented Venezuela at the Davis Cup where he has a win–loss record of 23–13.

== Challenger and Futures finals ==
=== Singles: 5 (0–5) ===
Legend (singles) ATP Challenger Tour (0–0) ITF Futures Tour (0–5)	Titles by surface Hard (0–3) Clay (0–2) Grass (0–0) Carpet (0–0)

Result	W–L	Date	Tournament	Tier	Surface	Opponent	Score
Loss	0–1	Jul 2012	USA F17, Innisbrook	Futures	Clay	(Slovenia) Blaž Rola	2–6, 1–6
Loss	0–2	Aug 2013	Venezuela F5, Caracas	Futures	Hard	(Venezuela) David Souto	6–7^{(5–7)}, 4–6
Loss	0–3	Nov 2013	Colombia F6, Popayán	Futures	Hard	(Greece) Theodoros Angelinos	6–7^{(5–7)}, 6–7^{(4–7)}
Loss	0–4	Dec 2013	Venezuela F9, Caracas	Futures	Clay	(Argentina) Juan Ignacio Londero	2–6, 1–6
Loss	0–5	Oct 2015	Venezuela F1, Maracaibo	Futures	Hard	(Serbia) Peđa Krstin	2–6, 1–6

=== Doubles: 85 (39–46) ===
Legend (doubles) ATP Challenger Tour (18–27) ITF Futures Tour (21–19)	Titles by surface Hard (24–22) Clay (15–24) Grass (0–0) Carpet (0–0)

Result	W–L	Date	Tournament	Tier	Surface	Partner	Opponents	Score
Loss	0–1	Nov 2007	Venezuela F7, Caracas	Futures	Hard	(Venezuela) Miguel Cicenia	(Venezuela) José de Armas (Venezuela) Jimy Szymanski	6–7^{(7–9)}, 6–7^{(4–7)}
Win	1–1	Jun 2008	Venezuela F1, Maracay	Futures	Hard	(Venezuela) Miguel Cicenia	(Venezuela) Piero Luisi (Venezuela) Roberto Maytín	6–3, 6–3
Loss	1–2	Aug 2008	Ecuador F2, Guayaquil	Futures	Hard	(Venezuela) Roberto Maytín	(United States) Shane La Porte (France) Fabrice Martin	6–7^{(8–10)}, 6–3, [7–10]
Win	2–2	Jul 2009	Venezuela F4, Puerto Ordaz	Futures	Hard	(Austria) Nikolaus Moser	(Argentina) Guillermo Durán (Argentina) Kevin Konfederak	6–1, 6–1
Win	3–2	Jul 2009	Venezuela F5, Caracas	Futures	Hard	(Austria) Nikolaus Moser	(Venezuela) Juan de Armas (Venezuela) Daniel Vallverdú	w/o
Win	4–2	Oct 2009	Venezuela F9, Caracas	Futures	Hard	(Venezuela) Yohny Romero	(Uruguay) Ariel Behar (Peru) Mauricio Echazú	7–6^{(7–5)}, 7–5
Loss	4–3	Dec 2009	Dominican Republic F3, Santo Domingo	Futures	Hard	(Austria) Nikolaus Moser	(Austria) Maximilian Neuchrist (Austria) Tristan-Samuel Weissborn	6–0, 6–7^{(4–7)}, [8–10]
Loss	4–4	Jan 2011	Brazil F5, João Pessoa	Futures	Clay	(Uruguay) Ariel Behar	(Brazil) Marcelo Demoliner (United Kingdom) Morgan Phillips	3–6, 5–7
Loss	4–5	Apr 2011	Chile F3, Santiago	Futures	Clay	(Mexico) Miguel Ángel Reyes-Varela	(Peru) Duilio Beretta (Ecuador) Roberto Quiroz	4–6, 5–7
Loss	4–6	Aug 2011	Peru F3, Trujillo	Futures	Clay	(Chile) Cristóbal Saavedra Corvalán	(Argentina) Joaquín-Jesús Monteferrario (Argentina) Agustín Velotti	6–2, 4–6, [8–10]
Loss	4–7	Nov 2011	Chile F13, Osorno	Futures	Clay	(Mexico) Manuel Sánchez	(Chile) Javier Muñoz (Chile) Juan Carlos Sáez	6–3, 4–6, [1–10]
Win	5–7	May 2012	Venezuela F2, Caracas	Futures	Hard	(Venezuela) David Souto	(Argentina) Maximiliano Estévez (Argentina) Benjamin Tenti	2–6, 7–6^{(8–6)}, [10–4]
Loss	5–8	Aug 2012	Ecuador F1, Guayaquil	Futures	Hard	(Mexico) Miguel Gallardo Valles	(Ecuador) Emilio Gómez (Ecuador) Roberto Quiroz	4–6, 6–7^{(4–7)}
Win	6–8	May 2013	Venezuela F1, Maracay	Futures	Hard	(Venezuela) David Souto	(Venezuela) Piero Luisi (Venezuela) Román Recarte	6–3, 7–5
Loss	6–9	May 2013	Venezuela F2, Maracaibo	Futures	Hard	(Venezuela) Piero Luisi	(Venezuela) Luis Fernando Ramírez (Venezuela) David Souto	5–7, 4–6
Win	7–9	Jun 2013	Mexico F10, Quintana Roo	Futures	Hard	(Venezuela) David Souto	(United States) Jean-Yves Aubone (United States) Austin Krajicek	6–4, 4–6, [10–6]
Loss	7–10	Jul 2013	Egypt F15, Sharm El Sheikh	Futures	Clay	(Netherlands) Mark Vervoort	(Bosnia and Herzegovina) Nerman Fatić (Bosnia and Herzegovina) Ismar Gorčić	3–6, 3–6
Win	8–10	Aug 2013	Venezuela F3, Caracas	Futures	Hard	(Venezuela) Roberto Maytín	(Puerto Rico) Alex Llompart (Argentina) Mateo Nicolás Martínez	1–6, 6–2, [12–10]
Win	9–10	Aug 2013	Venezuela F5, Caracas	Futures	Hard	(Venezuela) Roberto Maytín	(Venezuela) Jesús Bandrés (Venezuela) Luis Fernando Ramírez	2–6, 7–6^{(7–5)}, [10–3]
Win	10–10	Oct 2013	Mexico F16, Quintana Roo	Futures	Hard	(Venezuela) Roberto Maytín	(Puerto Rico) Alex Llompart (New Zealand) Finn Tearney	6–3, 6–4
Loss	10–11	Nov 2013	Mexico F18, Mérida	Futures	Hard	(Venezuela) Roberto Maytín	(United States) Oscar Fabian Matthews (United States) Kyle McMorrow	1–6, 5–7
Loss	10–12	Feb 2014	Guatemala F1, Guatemala City	Futures	Hard	(Ecuador) Emilio Gómez	(El Salvador) Marcelo Arévalo (Guatemala) Christopher Díaz Figueroa	3–6, 6–7^{(5–7)}
Loss	10–13	Jun 2014	Mexico F6, Quintana Roo	Futures	Hard	(Ecuador) Julio César Campozano	(Mexico) Gerardo López Villaseñor (Mexico) Rogelio Siller	6–7^{(5–7)}, 2–6
Loss	10–14	Jul 2014	Manta, Ecuador	Challenger	Hard	(Colombia) Eduardo Struvay	(United States) Chase Buchanan (Canada) Peter Polansky	4–6, 4–6
Win	11–14	Jul 2014	Venezuela F1, Caracas	Futures	Hard	(Argentina) Mateo Nicolás Martínez	(Venezuela) Jesús Bandrés (Venezuela) Luis Fernando Ramírez	7–6^{(8–6)}, 6–2
Win	12–14	Oct 2014	USA F29, Brownsville	Futures	Hard	(Mexico) Hans Hach	(Russia) Mikhail Fufygin (Russia) Vitali Reshetnikov	7–6^{(7–3)}, 7–6^{(7–3)}
Loss	12–15	Jan 2015	USA F5, Weston	Futures	Clay	(El Salvador) Marcelo Arévalo	(Monaco) Romain Arneodo (Monaco) Benjamin Balleret	5–7, 6–7^{(2–7)}
Win	13–15	Feb 2015	El Salvador F1, Santa Tecla	Futures	Clay	(El Salvador) Marcelo Arévalo	(South Africa) Keith-Patrick Crowley (Mexico) Hans Hach	6–4, 6–4
Win	14–15	May 2015	Mexico F1, Morelia	Futures	Hard	(Mexico) Hans Hach	(United States) Oscar Fabian Matthews (United States) Hunter Nicholas	6–2, 7–6^{(7–0)}
Loss	14–16	May 2015	Mexico F4, Córdoba	Futures	Hard	(Ecuador) Iván Endara	(South Africa) Keith-Patrick Crowley (Mexico) Hans Hach	4–6, 3–6
Loss	14–17	Jun 2015	Mexico F5, Manzanillo	Futures	Hard	(Mexico) Luis Patiño	(Ecuador) Iván Endara (Mexico) Tigre Hank	4–6, 4–6
Win	15–17	Jun 2015	Mexico F6, Manzanillo	Futures	Hard	(Mexico) Luis Patiño	(United States) Jean-Yves Aubone (United States) Andre Dome	w/o
Loss	15–18	Jun 2015	Mexico F7, Manzanillo	Futures	Hard	(Mexico) Luis Patiño	(Mexico) Mauricio Astorga (Canada) Pavel Krainik	3–6, 6–7^{(4–7)}
Win	16–18	Jun 2015	Mexico F8, Manzanillo	Futures	Hard	(Mexico) Luis Patiño	(United States) John Lamble (Antigua and Barbuda) Jody Maginley	7–5, 6–2
Win	17–18	Aug 2015	Canada F7, Winnipeg	Futures	Hard	(Mexico) Luis Patiño	(Ecuador) Gonzalo Escobar (Japan) Sora Fukuda	6–4, 6–3
Win	18–18	Sep 2015	Canada F8, Calgary	Futures	Hard	(Mexico) Luis Patiño	(South Africa) Damon Gooch (United States) Wil Spencer	6–4, 4–6, [10–2]
Win	19–18	Oct 2015	Venezuela F1, Maracaibo	Futures	Hard	(Argentina) Agustín Velotti	(Argentina) Julián Busch (Argentina) Franco Feitt	7–6^{(7–2)}, 6–1
Win	20–18	Nov 2015	Venezuela F2, Maracay	Futures	Hard	(Argentina) Agustín Velotti	(Peru) Mauricio Echazú (Peru) Jorge Brian Panta	6–3, 6–4
Loss	20–19	Jan 2016	Bucaramanga, Colombia	Challenger	Clay	(Peru) Sergio Galdós	(Chile) Julio Peralta (Argentina) Horacio Zeballos	2–6, 2–6
Loss	20–20	Jan 2017	USA F5, Weston	Futures	Clay	(Ecuador) Gonzalo Escobar	(Argentina) Facundo Argüello (Argentina) Juan Ignacio Londero	4–6, 7–6^{(7–1)}, [12–14]
Loss	20–21	Jun 2017	USA F19, Winston-Salem	Futures	Hard	(Germany) Dominik Köpfer	(United States) Christopher Eubanks (United States) Kevin King	3–6, 4–6
Win	21–21	Aug 2017	Santo Domingo, Dominican Republic	Challenger	Clay	(Argentina) Juan Ignacio Londero	(Colombia) Daniel Elahi Galán (Colombia) Santiago Giraldo	6–4, 6–4
Win	22–21	Nov 2017	USA F38, Columbus	Futures	Hard (i)	(Mexico) Hans Hach	(United Kingdom) Luke Bambridge (United Kingdom) Edward Corrie	3–6, 7–6^{(7–2)}, [10–7]
Loss	22–22	Mar 2018	Drummondville, Canada	Challenger	Hard (i)	(Canada) Filip Peliwo	(Belgium) Joris De Loore (Denmark) Frederik Nielsen	4–6, 3–6
Loss	22–23	Jul 2018	Scheveningen, Netherlands	Challenger	Clay	(Portugal) Gonçalo Oliveira	(Philippines) Ruben Gonzales (United States) Nathaniel Lammons	3–6, 7–6^{(10–8)}, [5–10]
Loss	22–24	Nov 2018	Champaign, USA	Challenger	Hard (i)	(Mexico) Hans Hach	(Australia) Matt Reid (Australia) John-Patrick Smith	4–6, 6–4, [8–10]
Loss	22–25	Feb 2019	Morelos, Mexico	Challenger	Hard	(Ecuador) Gonzalo Escobar	(Sweden) André Göransson (Switzerland) Marc-Andrea Hüsler	3–6, 6–3, [9–11]
Loss	22–26	May 2019	Puerto Vallarta, Mexico	Challenger	Hard	(Ecuador) Gonzalo Escobar	(Australia) Matt Reid (Australia) John-Patrick Smith	6–7^{(10–12)}, 3–6
Loss	22–27	Oct 2020	Marbella, Spain	Challenger	Clay	(Brazil) Fernando Romboli	(Spain) Gerard Granollers (Spain) Pedro Martínez	3–6, 4–6
Win	23–27	Nov 2020	Guayaquil, Ecuador	Challenger	Clay	(Brazil) Felipe Meligeni Alves	(Spain) Sergio Martos Gornés (Spain) Jaume Munar	6–0, 4–6, [10–3]
Win	24–27	Nov 2020	São Paulo, Brazil	Challenger	Clay	(Brazil) Felipe Meligeni Alves	(Brazil) Fernando Romboli (Brazil) Rogério Dutra Silva	6–3, 6–3
Loss	24–28	Dec 2020	Campinas, Brazil	Challenger	Clay	(Brazil) Felipe Meligeni Alves	(France) Sadio Doumbia (France) Fabien Reboul	7–6^{(9–7)}, 5–7, [7–10]
Loss	24–29	Jan 2021	Antalya, Turkey	Challenger	Clay	(Spain) David Vega Hernández	(Ukraine) Denys Molchanov (Kazakhstan) Aleksandr Nedovyesov	6–3, 4–6, [16–18]
Win	25–29	Feb 2021	Biella, Italy	Challenger	Hard (i)	(Spain) David Vega Hernández	(Poland) Szymon Walków (Poland) Jan Zieliński	6–4, 3–6, [10–8]
Win	26–29	Mar 2021	Santiago, Chile	Challenger	Clay	(Portugal) Gonçalo Oliveira	(Brazil) Rafael Matos (Brazil) Felipe Meligeni Alves	7–5, 6–1
Loss	26–30	June 2021	Biella, Italy	Challenger	Clay	(Spain) David Vega Hernández	(Argentina) Tomás Martín Etcheverry (Argentina) Renzo Olivo	6–3, 3–6, [8–10]
Loss	26–31	June 2021	Bratislava, Slovakia	Challenger	Clay	(Netherlands) Sander Arends	(Ukraine) Denys Molchanov (Kazakhstan) Aleksandr Nedovyesov	6–7^{(5-7)}, 1–6
Win	27–31	Aug 2021	San Marino, San Marino	Challenger	Clay	(Czech Republic) Zdeněk Kolář	(Brazil) Rafael Matos (Brazil) João Menezes	1–6, 6–3, [10–3]
Loss	27–32	Aug 2021	Como, Italy	Challenger	Clay	(Italy) Andrea Vavassori	(Brazil) Rafael Matos (Brazil) Felipe Meligeni Alves	7-6^{(7-2)}, 4-6, [6-10]
Win	28–32	Mar 2022	Pereira, Colombia	Challenger	Clay	(Colombia) Cristian Rodríguez	(Kazakhstan) Grigoriy Lomakin (Ukraine) Oleg Prihodko	7–6^{(7–2)}, 7–6^{(7–3)}
Loss	28–33	Apr 2022	San Luis Potosi, Mexico	Challenger	Clay	(Brazil) Felipe Meligeni Alves	(Colombia) Nicolás Barrientos (Mexico) Miguel Ángel Reyes-Varela	6–7^{(11–13)}, 2–6
Win	29–33	Jul 2022	Verona, Italy	Challenger	Clay	(Italy) Andrea Vavassori	(Argentina) Juan Ignacio Galarza (Slovenia) Tomás Lipovšek Puches	7–6^{(7–4)}, 3–6, [12–10]
Loss	29–34	Jul 2022	Pozoblanco, Spain	Challenger	Hard	(Romania) Victor Vlad Cornea	(France) Dan Added (France) Albano Olivetti	6–3, 1–6, [10–12]
Loss	29–35	Oct 2022	Parma, Italy	Challenger	Clay	(Slovakia) Igor Zelenay	(Bosnia and Herzegovina) Tomislav Brkić (Serbia) Nikola Ćaćić	2–6, 2–6
Loss	29–36	Oct 2022	Guayaquil, Ecuador	Challenger	Clay	(Argentina) Facundo Díaz Acosta	(Argentina) Guido Andreozzi (Argentina) Guillermo Durán	0–6, 4–6
Loss	29–37	Nov 2022	Montevideo, Uruguay	Challenger	Clay	(Argentina) Facundo Díaz Acosta	(Poland) Karol Drzewiecki (Poland) Piotr Matuszewski	4–6, 4–6
Loss	29–38	Nov 2022	Temuco, Chile	Challenger	Hard	(India) Jeevan Nedunchezhiyan	(Argentina) Guido Andreozzi (Argentina) Guillermo Durán	4–6, 2–6
Loss	29–39	Feb 2023	Monterrey, Mexico	Challenger	Hard	(Colombia) Cristian Rodríguez	(Sweden) André Göransson (Japan) Ben McLachlan	3–6, 4–6
Loss	29–40	Apr 2023	Tallahassee, USA	Challenger	Clay	(United States) William Blumberg	(Argentina) Federico Agustín Gómez (Argentina) Nicolás Kicker	6–7^{(2–7)}, 6–4, [11–13]
Win	30–40	Apr 2023	Savannah, USA	Challenger	Clay	(United States) William Blumberg	(Argentina) Federico Agustín Gómez (Argentina) Nicolás Kicker	6–1, 6–4
Win	31–40	Jun 2023	Modena, Italy	Challenger	Clay	(United States) William Blumberg	(Czech Republic) Roman Jebavý (Ukraine) Vladyslav Manafov	6–4, 6–4
Loss	31–41	Sep 2023	Cary, United States	Challenger	Hard	(United States) William Blumberg	(Australia) Andrew Harris (Australia) Rinky Hijikata	4–6, 6–3, [6–10]
Loss	31–42	Oct 2023	Tiburon, United States	Challenger	Hard	(United States) William Blumberg	(United Kingdom) Luke Johnson (Tunisia) Skander Mansouri	2–6, 3–6
Win	32–42	Nov 2023	Knoxville, United States	Challenger	Hard	(United States) Cannon Kingsley	(United States) Mac Kiger (United States) Mitchell Krueger	7–6^{(7–3)}, 6–3
Win	33–42	Jan 2024	Tenerife, Spain	Challenger	Hard	(United States) Vasil Kirkov	(Poland) Karol Drzewiecki (Poland) Piotr Matuszewski	3–6, 6–4, [10–3]
Loss	33–43	Apr 2024	Tallahassee, United States	Challenger	Clay	(United States) William Blumberg	(Sweden) Simon Freund (Denmark) Johannes Ingildsen	5–7, 6–7^{(4–7)}
Win	34–43	Nov 2024	São Paulo, Brazil	Challenger	Hard	(Argentina) Federico Agustín Gómez	(United States) Christian Harrison (United States) Evan King	7–6^{(7–4)}, 7–5
Loss	34–44	Apr 2025	Sarasota, United States	Challenger	Clay	(Argentina) Federico Agustín Gómez	(United States) Robert Cash (United States) JJ Tracy	4–6, 6–7^{(3–7)}
Win	35–44	Apr 2025	Savannah, United States	Challenger	Clay	(Argentina) Federico Agustín Gómez	(United States) Mac Kiger (United States) Patrick Maloney	3–6, 6–3, [10–5]
Win	36–44	May 2025	Francavilla, Italy	Challenger	Clay	(Argentina) Facundo Mena	(France) Théo Arribagé (France) Grégoire Jacq	7–5, 2–6, [10–6]
Win	37–44	Jun 2025	Modena, Italy	Challenger	Clay	(Argentina) Federico Agustín Gómez	(Denmark) Johannes Ingildsen (Slovakia) Miloš Karol	7–5, 7–6^{(7–5).}
Win	38–44	Oct 2025	Cali, Colombia	Challenger	Clay	(Argentina) Federico Agustín Gómez	(Argentina) Guido Iván Justo (Uruguay) Franco Roncadelli	6–4, 6–4
Loss	38–45	Oct 2025	Lima, Peru	Challenger	Clay	(Argentina) Federico Agustín Gómez	(Ecuador) Gonzalo Escobar (Mexico) Miguel Ángel Reyes-Varela	4–6, 4–6
Win	39–45	Nov 2025	Bogotá, Colombia	Challenger	Clay	(Colombia) Cristian Rodríguez	(Colombia) Nicolás Barrientos (United States) Benjamin Kittay	6–1, 6–4
Loss	39–46	Apr 2026	Savannah, United States	Challenger	Clay	(Colombia) Cristian Rodríguez	(Canada) Cleeve Harper (United Kingdom) David Stevenson	6–7^{(4–7).}, 2–6
