= 2021 ITF Men's World Tennis Tour (October–December) =

2021 edition of the second-tier tour for men's professional tennis

The 2021 ITF Men's World Tennis Tour is the 2021 edition of the second-tier tour for men's professional tennis. It is organised by the International Tennis Federation and is a tier below the ATP Challenger Tour. The ITF Men's World Tennis Tour includes tournaments with prize money ranging from $15,000 to $25,000.

== Key ==
M25 tournaments
M15 tournaments

== Month ==
=== October ===
Week of	Tournament	Winner	Runners-up	Semifinalists	Quarterfinalists
October 4	Prague, Czech Republic; Hard (indoor); M25; Singles and Doubles Draws	(Uzbekistan) Khumoyun Sultanov; 6–2, 3–6, 6–4	(Czech Republic) David Poljak	(Germany) Timo Stodder (Germany) Tobias Simon	(Germany) Max Hans Rehberg (Czech Republic) Marek Gengel (Belarus) Uladzimir Ignatik (Uzbekistan) Sanjar Fayziev
October 4	Prague, Czech Republic; Hard (indoor); M25; Singles and Doubles Draws	(Czech Republic) Andrew Paulson (Czech Republic) David Poljak; 7–5, 6–1	(Czech Republic) Filip Duda (Czech Republic) Adam Pavlásek	(Germany) Timo Stodder (Germany) Tobias Simon	(Germany) Max Hans Rehberg (Czech Republic) Marek Gengel (Belarus) Uladzimir Ignatik (Uzbekistan) Sanjar Fayziev
October 4	Nevers, France; Hard (indoor); M25; Singles and Doubles Draws	(Norway) Viktor Durasovic; 6–2, 6–4	(France) Arthur Reymond	(Russia) Alexey Vatutin (France) Luca Van Assche	(Belgium) Yannick Mertens (Switzerland) Antoine Bellier (France) Giovanni Mpetshi Perricard (France) Antoine Escoffier
October 4	Nevers, France; Hard (indoor); M25; Singles and Doubles Draws	(Australia) Blake Ellis (Australia) Tristan Schoolkate; 5–7, 7–6^{(7–5)}, [10–8]	(United Kingdom) Millen Hurrion (United Kingdom) Ben Jones	(Russia) Alexey Vatutin (France) Luca Van Assche	(Belgium) Yannick Mertens (Switzerland) Antoine Bellier (France) Giovanni Mpetshi Perricard (France) Antoine Escoffier
October 4	Lima, Peru; Clay; M25; Singles and Doubles Draws	(Brazil) Daniel Dutra da Silva; 7–6^{(8–6)}, 6–4	(Spain) Eduard Esteve Lobato	(Brazil) Wilson Leite (Brazil) Oscar José Gutierrez	(Chile) Michel Vernier (Spain) Pol Martín Tiffon (Peru) Arklon Huertas del Pino (Bolivia) Murkel Dellien
October 4	Lima, Peru; Clay; M25; Singles and Doubles Draws	(Bolivia) Murkel Dellien (Peru) Jorge Panta; 7–6^{(7–4)}, 7–6^{(7–3)}	(Ecuador) Antonio Cayetano March (Spain) Pol Martín Tiffon	(Brazil) Wilson Leite (Brazil) Oscar José Gutierrez	(Chile) Michel Vernier (Spain) Pol Martín Tiffon (Peru) Arklon Huertas del Pino (Bolivia) Murkel Dellien
October 4	Setúbal, Portugal; Hard; M25; Singles and Doubles Draws	(France) Arthur Cazaux; 7–5, 6–0	(Australia) Rinky Hijikata	(France) Laurent Lokoli (Austria) Maximilian Neuchrist	(Germany) Sebastian Fanselow (Japan) Yusuke Takahashi (France) Corentin Denolly (Cyprus) Petros Chrysochos
October 4	Setúbal, Portugal; Hard; M25; Singles and Doubles Draws	(Italy) Luciano Darderi (Mexico) Luis Patiño; 6–3, 6–3	(Portugal) Pedro Araújo (Portugal) Fábio Coelho	(France) Laurent Lokoli (Austria) Maximilian Neuchrist	(Germany) Sebastian Fanselow (Japan) Yusuke Takahashi (France) Corentin Denolly (Cyprus) Petros Chrysochos
October 4	Sozopol, Bulgaria; Hard; M15; Singles and Doubles Draws	(United Kingdom) Billy Harris; 6–4, 6–1	(Germany) Kai Wehnelt	(Russia) Yan Bondarevskiy (Bulgaria) Alexander Donski	(Bulgaria) Alexandar Lazarov (Moldova) Alexander Cozbinov (Germany) Tim Handel (Moldova) Ilya Snițari
October 4	Sozopol, Bulgaria; Hard; M15; Singles and Doubles Draws	(Bulgaria) Alexander Donski (United Kingdom) Billy Harris; 6–1, 6–4	(Russia) Yan Bondarevskiy (Germany) Kai Wehnelt	(Russia) Yan Bondarevskiy (Bulgaria) Alexander Donski	(Bulgaria) Alexandar Lazarov (Moldova) Alexander Cozbinov (Germany) Tim Handel (Moldova) Ilya Snițari
October 4	Sharm El Sheikh, Egypt; Hard; M15; Singles and Doubles Draws	(Brazil) Gabriel Décamps; 7–5, 6–7^{(4–7)}, 6–0	(Czech Republic) Petr Hájek	(Italy) Lorenzo Bocchi (France) Nathan Seateun	(Italy) Alessandro Ragazzi (India) S. D. Prajwal Dev (Ukraine) Volodymyr Uzhylovskyi (Belarus) Erik Arutiunian
October 4	Sharm El Sheikh, Egypt; Hard; M15; Singles and Doubles Draws	(Romania) Cezar Crețu (Ukraine) Volodymyr Uzhylovskyi; 7–6^{(7–1)}, 6–1	(Brazil) Gabriel Décamps (Czech Republic) Petr Hájek	(Italy) Lorenzo Bocchi (France) Nathan Seateun	(Italy) Alessandro Ragazzi (India) S. D. Prajwal Dev (Ukraine) Volodymyr Uzhylovskyi (Belarus) Erik Arutiunian
October 4	Cancún, Mexico; Hard; M15; Singles and Doubles Draws	(United States) Christian Langmo; 6–1, 3–6, 6–3	(France) Jaimee Floyd Angele	(Mexico) Alex Hernández (United States) Alfredo Perez	(Costa Rica) Jesse Flores (Japan) Seita Watanabe (Argentina) Federico Agustín Gómez (United States) Adam El Mihdawy
October 4	Cancún, Mexico; Hard; M15; Singles and Doubles Draws	(India) Siddhant Banthia (Japan) Seita Watanabe; 1–6, 6–4, [10–3]	(Japan) Sho Shimabukuro (Japan) Naoki Tajima	(Mexico) Alex Hernández (United States) Alfredo Perez	(Costa Rica) Jesse Flores (Japan) Seita Watanabe (Argentina) Federico Agustín Gómez (United States) Adam El Mihdawy
October 4	Doha, Qatar; Hard; M15; Singles and Doubles Draws	(Germany) Oscar Moraing; 7–5, 6–3	(United Kingdom) Ryan James Storrie	(Georgia (country)) Aleksandre Bakshi (Germany) Dominik Böhler	(China) Mu Tao (Denmark) Christian Sigsgaard (Kazakhstan) Beibit Zhukayev (Finland) Iiro Vasa
October 4	Doha, Qatar; Hard; M15; Singles and Doubles Draws	(United Kingdom) Julian Cash (Denmark) Christian Sigsgaard; 6–4, 6–4	(India) Saketh Myneni (Finland) Patrik Niklas-Salminen	(Georgia (country)) Aleksandre Bakshi (Germany) Dominik Böhler	(China) Mu Tao (Denmark) Christian Sigsgaard (Kazakhstan) Beibit Zhukayev (Finland) Iiro Vasa
October 4	Platja d'Aro, Spain; Clay; M15; Singles and Doubles Draws	(Russia) Ivan Gakhov; 6–4, 5–7, 6–2	(Spain) José Francisco Vidal Azorín	(Italy) Giovanni Fonio (Spain) Pol Toledo Bagué	(France) Maxime Chazal (France) Clément Tabur (Spain) Carlos Sánchez Jover (Netherlands) Guy den Heijer
October 4	Platja d'Aro, Spain; Clay; M15; Singles and Doubles Draws	(Belgium) Julien Cagnina (France) Maxime Chazal; 6–4, 7–5	(France) Valentin Lapalu (France) Clément Tabur	(Italy) Giovanni Fonio (Spain) Pol Toledo Bagué	(France) Maxime Chazal (France) Clément Tabur (Spain) Carlos Sánchez Jover (Netherlands) Guy den Heijer
October 4	Monastir, Tunisia; Hard; M15; Singles and Doubles Draws	(Netherlands) Guy den Ouden; 6–4, 6–2	(France) Ugo Blanchet	(Tunisia) Skander Mansouri (France) Valentin Vacherot	(Switzerland) Mirko Martinez (Poland) Wojciech Marek (France) Quentin Folliot (Argentina) Mateo Nicolás Martínez
October 4	Monastir, Tunisia; Hard; M15; Singles and Doubles Draws	(India) Niki Kaliyanda Poonacha (Kazakhstan) Grigoriy Lomakin; 6–1, 7–5	(Tunisia) Anis Ghorbel (Switzerland) Mirko Martinez	(Tunisia) Skander Mansouri (France) Valentin Vacherot	(Switzerland) Mirko Martinez (Poland) Wojciech Marek (France) Quentin Folliot (Argentina) Mateo Nicolás Martínez
October 4	Naples, United States; Clay; M15; Singles and Doubles Draws	(United States) Ryan Harrison; 6–3, 7–5	(France) Antoine Cornut-Chauvinc	(Canada) Liam Draxl (Switzerland) Damien Wenger	(United States) Michael Redlicki (Argentina) Juan Ignacio Galarza (Venezuela) Ricardo Rodríguez-Pace (Dominican Republic) Peter Bertran
October 4	Naples, United States; Clay; M15; Singles and Doubles Draws	(United States) John Bernard (France) Antoine Cornut-Chauvinc; 6–3, 6–7^{(2–7)}, [10–8]	(Switzerland) Louroi Martinez (Switzerland) Damien Wenger	(Canada) Liam Draxl (Switzerland) Damien Wenger	(United States) Michael Redlicki (Argentina) Juan Ignacio Galarza (Venezuela) Ricardo Rodríguez-Pace (Dominican Republic) Peter Bertran
October 4	Ithaca, United States; Hard (indoor); M15; Singles and Doubles Draws	(United Kingdom) Charles Broom; 6–7^{(5–7)}, 6–3, 6–4	(United Kingdom) Henry Patten	(United States) A.J. Catanzariti (United States) Toby Kodat	(United States) Alafia Ayeni (United States) Eduardo Nava (Romania) Radu Mihai Papoe (United States) Keegan Smith
October 4	Ithaca, United States; Hard (indoor); M15; Singles and Doubles Draws	(United Kingdom) Charles Broom (United Kingdom) Henry Patten; 7–6^{(8–6)}, 6–3	(United States) Eduardo Nava (United States) Nathan Ponwith	(United States) A.J. Catanzariti (United States) Toby Kodat	(United States) Alafia Ayeni (United States) Eduardo Nava (Romania) Radu Mihai Papoe (United States) Keegan Smith
October 11	Rodez, France; Hard (indoor); M25+H; Singles and Doubles Draws	(France) Antoine Escoffier; 5–7, 7–5, 6–4	(United Kingdom) Aidan McHugh	(United States) Martin Damm (Russia) Artem Dubrivnyy	(Australia) Li Tu (Belgium) Yannick Mertens (Netherlands) Gijs Brouwer (France) Arthur Reymond
October 11	Rodez, France; Hard (indoor); M25+H; Singles and Doubles Draws	(United States) Felix Corwin (United States) Martin Damm; 3–6, 7–5, [10–7]	(Netherlands) Gijs Brouwer (Netherlands) Jelle Sels	(United States) Martin Damm (Russia) Artem Dubrivnyy	(Australia) Li Tu (Belgium) Yannick Mertens (Netherlands) Gijs Brouwer (France) Arthur Reymond
October 11	Lima, Peru; Clay; M25; Singles and Doubles Draws	(Brazil) Gilbert Klier Júnior; 7–6^{(8–6)}, 6–3	(Brazil) Daniel Dutra da Silva	(Sweden) Jonathan Mridha (Argentina) Facundo Juárez	(Spain) Eduard Esteve Lobato (Argentina) Gonzalo Villanueva (Peru) Conner Huertas del Pino (Spain) Oriol Roca Batalla
October 11	Lima, Peru; Clay; M25; Singles and Doubles Draws	(Peru) Arklon Huertas del Pino (Peru) Conner Huertas del Pino; 6–2, 6–2	(Brazil) Daniel Dutra da Silva (Brazil) Wilson Leite	(Sweden) Jonathan Mridha (Argentina) Facundo Juárez	(Spain) Eduard Esteve Lobato (Argentina) Gonzalo Villanueva (Peru) Conner Huertas del Pino (Spain) Oriol Roca Batalla
October 11	Loulé, Portugal; Hard; M25; Singles and Doubles Draws	(Japan) Kaichi Uchida; 6–4, 6–4	(Germany) Lucas Gerch	(Austria) Maximilian Neuchrist (Portugal) Pedro Araújo	(Japan) Yusuke Takahashi (Spain) Adrià Soriano Barrera (Australia) Rinky Hijikata (France) Arthur Cazaux
October 11	Loulé, Portugal; Hard; M25; Singles and Doubles Draws	(Australia) Rinky Hijikata (Netherlands) Mick Veldheer; 6–2, 6–3	(Portugal) Gonçalo Falcão (Slovenia) Tomás Lipovšek Puches	(Austria) Maximilian Neuchrist (Portugal) Pedro Araújo	(Japan) Yusuke Takahashi (Spain) Adrià Soriano Barrera (Australia) Rinky Hijikata (France) Arthur Cazaux
October 11	Sozopol, Bulgaria; Hard; M15; Singles and Doubles Draws	(Russia) Yan Bondarevskiy; 6–2, 6–3	(United Kingdom) Billy Harris	(Israel) Ben Patael (Czech Republic) Andrew Paulson	(Romania) David Ionel (Bulgaria) Simeon Terziev (Syria) Hazem Naw (Serbia) Marko Tepavac
October 11	Sozopol, Bulgaria; Hard; M15; Singles and Doubles Draws	(Syria) Hazem Naw (Poland) Yann Wójcik; 6–4, 5–7, [10–6]	(Russia) Yan Bondarevskiy (Romania) David Ionel	(Israel) Ben Patael (Czech Republic) Andrew Paulson	(Romania) David Ionel (Bulgaria) Simeon Terziev (Syria) Hazem Naw (Serbia) Marko Tepavac
October 11	Sharm El Sheikh, Egypt; Hard; M15; Singles and Doubles Draws	(Czech Republic) Marek Gengel; 6–4, 6–0	(Hungary) Péter Fajta	(Vietnam) Lý Hoàng Nam (Slovakia) Lukáš Pokorný	(Austria) Neil Oberleitner (France) Nathan Seateun (Brazil) Gabriel Décamps (Lebanon) Hady Habib
October 11	Sharm El Sheikh, Egypt; Hard; M15; Singles and Doubles Draws	(Romania) Cezar Crețu (Czech Republic) Marek Gengel; 6–2, 6–2	(Italy) Lorenzo Bocchi (Italy) Andrea Guerrieri	(Vietnam) Lý Hoàng Nam (Slovakia) Lukáš Pokorný	(Austria) Neil Oberleitner (France) Nathan Seateun (Brazil) Gabriel Décamps (Lebanon) Hady Habib
October 11	Cancún, Mexico; Hard; M15; Singles and Doubles Draws	(United Kingdom) Giles Hussey; 6–3, 5–7, 6–4	(United States) Christian Langmo	(Argentina) Matías Franco Descotte (Japan) Sho Shimabukuro	(United States) Victor Lilov (United States) Alexander Bernard (United States) Nicholas Bybel (Bolivia) Alejandro Mendoza
October 11	Cancún, Mexico; Hard; M15; Singles and Doubles Draws	(Japan) Sho Shimabukuro (Japan) Naoki Tajima; 7–6^{(7–5)}, 6–4	(Dominican Republic) Peter Bertran (United States) Mwendwa Mbithi	(Argentina) Matías Franco Descotte (Japan) Sho Shimabukuro	(United States) Victor Lilov (United States) Alexander Bernard (United States) Nicholas Bybel (Bolivia) Alejandro Mendoza
October 11	Doha, Qatar; Hard; M15; Singles and Doubles Draws	(Netherlands) Alec Deckers; 6–4, 3–6, 6–3	(France) Valentin Vacherot	(Germany) Oscar Moraing (Turkey) Yankı Erel	(United Kingdom) Daniel Cox (Slovenia) Tom Kočevar-Dešman (United Kingdom) Alastair Gray (Germany) Dominik Böhler
October 11	Doha, Qatar; Hard; M15; Singles and Doubles Draws	(United Kingdom) Julian Cash (Denmark) Christian Sigsgaard; 6–3, 6–3	(China) Li Hanwen (Kazakhstan) Beibit Zhukayev	(Germany) Oscar Moraing (Turkey) Yankı Erel	(United Kingdom) Daniel Cox (Slovenia) Tom Kočevar-Dešman (United Kingdom) Alastair Gray (Germany) Dominik Böhler
October 11	Kazan, Russia; Hard (indoor); M15; Singles and Doubles Draws	(Russia) Bogdan Bobrov; 7–5, 6–4	(Russia) Alibek Kachmazov	(Belarus) Ivan Liutarevich (Russia) Pavel Verbin	(Zimbabwe) Benjamin Lock (Uzbekistan) Sanjar Fayziev (Russia) Egor Agafonov (Russia) Aristarkh Safonov
October 11	Kazan, Russia; Hard (indoor); M15; Singles and Doubles Draws	(Uzbekistan) Sanjar Fayziev (Zimbabwe) Benjamin Lock; 6–2, 6–1	(Belarus) Aliaksandr Liaonenka (Belarus) Alexander Zgirovsky	(Belarus) Ivan Liutarevich (Russia) Pavel Verbin	(Zimbabwe) Benjamin Lock (Uzbekistan) Sanjar Fayziev (Russia) Egor Agafonov (Russia) Aristarkh Safonov
October 11	Platja d'Aro, Spain; Clay; M15; Singles and Doubles Draws	(Spain) Carlos Sánchez Jover; 6–3, 6–3	(France) Maxime Chazal	(Spain) Miguel Damas (Spain) Pol Toledo Bagué	(Spain) Max Alcalá Gurri (Spain) José Francisco Vidal Azorín (France) Alexis Musialek (Georgia (country)) Aleksandre Metreveli
October 11	Platja d'Aro, Spain; Clay; M15; Singles and Doubles Draws	(Netherlands) Max Houkes (Netherlands) Niels Visker; 4–6, 6–4, [10–6]	(Argentina) Alex Barrena (Spain) Carlos López Montagud	(Spain) Miguel Damas (Spain) Pol Toledo Bagué	(Spain) Max Alcalá Gurri (Spain) José Francisco Vidal Azorín (France) Alexis Musialek (Georgia (country)) Aleksandre Metreveli
October 11	Monastir, Tunisia; Hard; M15; Singles and Doubles Draws	(Argentina) Mateo Nicolás Martínez; 6–4, ret.	(Tunisia) Moez Echargui	(Tunisia) Aziz Dougaz (Tunisia) Skander Mansouri	(Australia) Moerani Bouzige (France) Robin Bertrand (Australia) Nikita Volonski (France) Alexis Boureau
October 11	Monastir, Tunisia; Hard; M15; Singles and Doubles Draws	(Argentina) Mateo Nicolás Martínez (New Zealand) Ajeet Rai; 6–7^{(1–7)}, 6–4, [11–9]	(Tunisia) Anis Ghorbel (Switzerland) Mirko Martinez	(Tunisia) Aziz Dougaz (Tunisia) Skander Mansouri	(Australia) Moerani Bouzige (France) Robin Bertrand (Australia) Nikita Volonski (France) Alexis Boureau
October 11	Antalya, Turkey; Clay; M15; Singles and Doubles Draws	(United Kingdom) Jack Pinnington Jones; 6–7^{(1–7)}, 6–4, 6–2	(Russia) Savva Polukhin	(Romania) Bogdan Ionuț Apostol (Romania) Călin Manda	(Poland) Daniel Michalski (Hungary) Gergely Madarász (Romania) Alexandru Jecan (Argentina) Juan Pablo Paz
October 11	Antalya, Turkey; Clay; M15; Singles and Doubles Draws	(Hungary) Gergely Madarász (Poland) Daniel Michalski; 6–4, 6–3	(Romania) Alexandru Jecan (Romania) Dan Alexandru Tomescu	(Romania) Bogdan Ionuț Apostol (Romania) Călin Manda	(Poland) Daniel Michalski (Hungary) Gergely Madarász (Romania) Alexandru Jecan (Argentina) Juan Pablo Paz
October 11	Naples, United States; Clay; M15; Singles and Doubles Draws	(China) Shang Juncheng; 6–3, 7–6^{(7–3)}	(Portugal) Duarte Vale	(United Kingdom) Blu Baker (Switzerland) Damien Wenger	(Colombia) Juan Manuel Benítez Chavarriaga (Denmark) Johannes Ingildsen (Jordan) Abedallah Shelbayh (United States) Jake Van Emburgh
October 11	Naples, United States; Clay; M15; Singles and Doubles Draws	(United States) Bruno Kuzuhara (Jordan) Abedallah Shelbayh; 6–4, 6–1	(Denmark) Johannes Ingildsen (Portugal) Duarte Vale	(United Kingdom) Blu Baker (Switzerland) Damien Wenger	(Colombia) Juan Manuel Benítez Chavarriaga (Denmark) Johannes Ingildsen (Jordan) Abedallah Shelbayh (United States) Jake Van Emburgh
October 18	Rio do Sul, Brazil; Clay; M25; Singles and Doubles Draws	(Brazil) Pedro Boscardin Dias; 7–6^{(7–4)}, 6–4	(Brazil) Gustavo Heide	(Argentina) Facundo Juárez (Brazil) Wilson Leite	(Brazil) Marcelo Zormann (Brazil) José Pereira (Brazil) Nicolas Zanellatto (Uruguay) Ignacio Carou
October 18	Rio do Sul, Brazil; Clay; M25; Singles and Doubles Draws	(Brazil) Daniel Dutra da Silva (Brazil) Igor Marcondes; 6–4, 6–3	(Brazil) Pedro Boscardin Dias (Brazil) Gustavo Heide	(Argentina) Facundo Juárez (Brazil) Wilson Leite	(Brazil) Marcelo Zormann (Brazil) José Pereira (Brazil) Nicolas Zanellatto (Uruguay) Ignacio Carou
October 18	Toulouse, France; Hard (indoor); M25; Singles and Doubles Draws	(Belgium) Joris De Loore; 6–2, 7–5	(France) Luca Van Assche	(Netherlands) Jelle Sels (Australia) Li Tu	(France) Harold Mayot (France) Axel Garcian (Italy) Mattia Bellucci (Austria) Lukas Neumayer
October 18	Toulouse, France; Hard (indoor); M25; Singles and Doubles Draws	(France) Théo Arribagé (France) Arthur Reymond; 7–6^{(7–4)}, 6–4	(France) Axel Garcian (France) Hugo Gaston	(Netherlands) Jelle Sels (Australia) Li Tu	(France) Harold Mayot (France) Axel Garcian (Italy) Mattia Bellucci (Austria) Lukas Neumayer
October 18	Hamburg, Germany; Hard (indoor); M25; Singles and Doubles Draws	(Switzerland) Jakub Paul; 6–4, 6–2	(Germany) Henri Squire	(Germany) Johannes Härteis (Germany) Louis Wessels	(Austria) Lenny Hampel (United Kingdom) Daniel Little (Czech Republic) Martin Krumich (Switzerland) Leandro Riedi
October 18	Hamburg, Germany; Hard (indoor); M25; Singles and Doubles Draws	(Switzerland) Leandro Riedi (Switzerland) Yannik Steinegger; 6–3, 6–2	(Norway) Viktor Durasovic (Ukraine) Vladyslav Orlov	(Germany) Johannes Härteis (Germany) Louis Wessels	(Austria) Lenny Hampel (United Kingdom) Daniel Little (Czech Republic) Martin Krumich (Switzerland) Leandro Riedi
October 18	Nur-Sultan, Kazakhstan; Hard (indoor); M25; Singles and Doubles Draws	(Canada) Filip Peliwo; 6–3, 7–5	(Russia) Andrey Kuznetsov	(Russia) Konstantin Kravchuk (Kazakhstan) Denis Yevseyev	(Uzbekistan) Sanjar Fayziev (Kazakhstan) Grigoriy Lomakin (Ukraine) Eric Vanshelboim (Belarus) Ivan Liutarevich
October 18	Nur-Sultan, Kazakhstan; Hard (indoor); M25; Singles and Doubles Draws	(Russia) Andrey Kuznetsov (Kazakhstan) Beibit Zhukayev; 7–6^{(7–5)}, 6–4	(Russia) Konstantin Kravchuk (Belarus) Ivan Liutarevich	(Russia) Konstantin Kravchuk (Kazakhstan) Denis Yevseyev	(Uzbekistan) Sanjar Fayziev (Kazakhstan) Grigoriy Lomakin (Ukraine) Eric Vanshelboim (Belarus) Ivan Liutarevich
October 18	Quinta do Lago, Portugal; Hard; M25; Singles and Doubles Draws	(France) Arthur Cazaux; 6–3, 6–4	(Japan) Naoki Nakagawa	(Japan) Kaichi Uchida (United Kingdom) Paul Jubb	(Spain) Roberto Ortega Olmedo (United Kingdom) Anton Matusevich (Austria) Maximilian Neuchrist (United Kingdom) Harry Wendelken
October 18	Quinta do Lago, Portugal; Hard; M25; Singles and Doubles Draws	(United Kingdom) Evan Hoyt (Tunisia) Skander Mansouri; 4–6, 6–3, [10–5]	(Spain) Alberto Barroso Campos (Spain) Roberto Ortega Olmedo	(Japan) Kaichi Uchida (United Kingdom) Paul Jubb	(Spain) Roberto Ortega Olmedo (United Kingdom) Anton Matusevich (Austria) Maximilian Neuchrist (United Kingdom) Harry Wendelken
October 18	Sharm El Sheikh, Egypt; Hard; M15; Singles and Doubles Draws	(Lebanon) Hady Habib; 6–2, 6–4	(Austria) Lukas Krainer	(Hungary) Péter Fajta (Italy) Simone Roncalli	(Czech Republic) Marek Gengel (China) Huang Haoyuan (Italy) Emiliano Maggioli (Ukraine) Marat Deviatiarov
October 18	Sharm El Sheikh, Egypt; Hard; M15; Singles and Doubles Draws	(Ukraine) Marat Deviatiarov (Ukraine) Volodymyr Uzhylovskyi; 6–4, 6–1	(Lithuania) Pijus Vaitiekūnas (Lithuania) Simonas Žukauskas	(Hungary) Péter Fajta (Italy) Simone Roncalli	(Czech Republic) Marek Gengel (China) Huang Haoyuan (Italy) Emiliano Maggioli (Ukraine) Marat Deviatiarov
October 18	Cancún, Mexico; Hard; M15; Singles and Doubles Draws	(Argentina) Matías Franco Descotte; 7–5, 6–4	(United States) Victor Lilov	(United States) Isaiah Strode (United States) Mwendwa Mbithi	(Slovenia) Matic Špec (Peru) Jorge Panta (United Kingdom) Giles Hussey (Mexico) Gerardo López Villaseñor
October 18	Cancún, Mexico; Hard; M15; Singles and Doubles Draws	(United States) Mwendwa Mbithi (Canada) Joshua Peck; 7–5, 7–6^{(7–4)}	(Dominican Republic) Peter Bertran (Peru) Jorge Panta	(United States) Isaiah Strode (United States) Mwendwa Mbithi	(Slovenia) Matic Špec (Peru) Jorge Panta (United Kingdom) Giles Hussey (Mexico) Gerardo López Villaseñor
October 18	Doha, Qatar; Hard; M15; Singles and Doubles Draws	(China) Li Hanwen; 6–4, 6–3	(United Kingdom) Julian Cash	(France) Térence Atmane (Georgia (country)) Aleksandre Bakshi	(Turkey) Yankı Erel (Sweden) Simon Freund (China) Mu Tao (Slovenia) Tom Kočevar-Dešman
October 18	Doha, Qatar; Hard; M15; Singles and Doubles Draws	(China) Li Hanwen (China) Mu Tao; Walkover	(Sweden) Simon Freund (Germany) Niklas Schell	(France) Térence Atmane (Georgia (country)) Aleksandre Bakshi	(Turkey) Yankı Erel (Sweden) Simon Freund (China) Mu Tao (Slovenia) Tom Kočevar-Dešman
October 18	Girona, Spain; Clay; M15; Singles and Doubles Draws	(Italy) Alexander Weis; 6–2, 6–7^{(7–9)}, 6–1	(Spain) Pol Toledo Bagué	(Poland) Maks Kaśnikowski (Spain) Carlos Sánchez Jover	(Russia) Ivan Gakhov (France) Lucas Bouquet (Argentina) Franco Emanuel Egea (Russia) Yan Bondarevskiy
October 18	Girona, Spain; Clay; M15; Singles and Doubles Draws	(Argentina) Alex Barrena (Spain) Carlos López Montagud; 6–0, 7–5	(Georgia (country)) Aleksandre Metreveli (Spain) Pol Toledo Bagué	(Poland) Maks Kaśnikowski (Spain) Carlos Sánchez Jover	(Russia) Ivan Gakhov (France) Lucas Bouquet (Argentina) Franco Emanuel Egea (Russia) Yan Bondarevskiy
October 18	Monastir, Tunisia; Hard; M15; Singles and Doubles Draws	(Australia) Moerani Bouzige; 6–4, 7–5	(France) Valentin Vacherot	(Argentina) Mateo Nicolás Martínez (France) Louis Tessa	(United States) Gage Brymer (France) Sascha Gueymard Wayenburg (France) Sean Cuenin (France) Édouard Villoslada
October 18	Monastir, Tunisia; Hard; M15; Singles and Doubles Draws	(Estonia) Daniil Glinka (Estonia) Karl Kiur Saar; 6–4, 6–2	(Serbia) Viktor Jović (Tunisia) Aziz Ouakaa	(Argentina) Mateo Nicolás Martínez (France) Louis Tessa	(United States) Gage Brymer (France) Sascha Gueymard Wayenburg (France) Sean Cuenin (France) Édouard Villoslada
October 18	Antalya, Turkey; Clay; M15; Singles and Doubles Draws	(Poland) Daniel Michalski; 6–3, 6–4	(Romania) David Ionel	(Russia) Savriyan Danilov (Argentina) Juan Pablo Paz	(Romania) Nicolae Frunză (United Kingdom) Billy Harris (Romania) Bogdan Ionuț Apostol (Hungary) Gergely Madarász
October 18	Antalya, Turkey; Clay; M15; Singles and Doubles Draws	(Hungary) Gergely Madarász (Hungary) Péter Nagy; 6–2, 6–4	(Argentina) Santiago de la Fuente (Argentina) Juan Pablo Paz	(Russia) Savriyan Danilov (Argentina) Juan Pablo Paz	(Romania) Nicolae Frunză (United Kingdom) Billy Harris (Romania) Bogdan Ionuț Apostol (Hungary) Gergely Madarász
October 18	Vero Beach, United States; Clay; M15; Singles and Doubles Draws	(China) Shang Juncheng; 7–6^{(8–6)}, 6–4	(Venezuela) Ricardo Rodríguez-Pace	(United States) Ezekiel Clark (Canada) Liam Draxl	(United States) Matthew Segura (Colombia) Juan Manuel Benítez Chavarriaga (United States) Ben Shelton (Portugal) Duarte Vale
October 18	Vero Beach, United States; Clay; M15; Singles and Doubles Draws	(Denmark) Johannes Ingildsen (Portugal) Duarte Vale; 6–3, 6–4	(Canada) Liam Draxl (United States) Ben Shelton	(United States) Ezekiel Clark (Canada) Liam Draxl	(United States) Matthew Segura (Colombia) Juan Manuel Benítez Chavarriaga (United States) Ben Shelton (Portugal) Duarte Vale
October 25	Guayaquil, Ecuador; Clay; M25; Singles and Doubles Draws	(Argentina) Facundo Juárez; 7–6^{(7–3)}, 6–3	(Brazil) Daniel Dutra da Silva	(United States) Oliver Crawford (Argentina) Juan Bautista Torres	(Bolivia) Murkel Dellien (France) Paul Valsecchi (Mexico) Alex Hernández (Argentina) Matías Zukas
October 25	Guayaquil, Ecuador; Clay; M25; Singles and Doubles Draws	(Argentina) Facundo Juárez (Mexico) Luis Patiño; 6–3, 6–4	(Ecuador) Ángel Díaz Jalil (Ecuador) Álvaro Guillén Meza	(United States) Oliver Crawford (Argentina) Juan Bautista Torres	(Bolivia) Murkel Dellien (France) Paul Valsecchi (Mexico) Alex Hernández (Argentina) Matías Zukas
October 25	Sarreguemines, France; Carpet (indoor); M25; Singles and Doubles Draws	(France) Dan Added; 6–3, 6–4	(Belgium) Gauthier Onclin	(France) Jurgen Briand (France) Hugo Voljacques	(Australia) Tristan Schoolkate (Brazil) Gabriel Décamps (Germany) Louis Wessels (France) Martin Breysach
October 25	Sarreguemines, France; Carpet (indoor); M25; Singles and Doubles Draws	(Australia) Blake Ellis (Australia) Tristan Schoolkate; 7–6^{(7–1)}, 3–6, [10–5]	(France) Constantin Bittoun Kouzmine (Germany) Hendrik Jebens	(France) Jurgen Briand (France) Hugo Voljacques	(Australia) Tristan Schoolkate (Brazil) Gabriel Décamps (Germany) Louis Wessels (France) Martin Breysach
October 25	Nur-Sultan, Kazakhstan; Hard (indoor); M25; Singles and Doubles Draws	(Russia) Alibek Kachmazov; 6–2, 4–6, 6–4	(Russia) Bogdan Bobrov	(Canada) Filip Peliwo (Russia) Yan Sabanin	(Poland) Michał Dembek (Kazakhstan) Beibit Zhukayev (Uzbekistan) Khumoyun Sultanov (Belarus) Mikalai Haliak
October 25	Nur-Sultan, Kazakhstan; Hard (indoor); M25; Singles and Doubles Draws	(Uzbekistan) Sanjar Fayziev (Greece) Markos Kalovelonis; 6–7^{(7–9)}, 6–4, [10–7]	(Belarus) Aliaksandr Liaonenka (Russia) Yan Sabanin	(Canada) Filip Peliwo (Russia) Yan Sabanin	(Poland) Michał Dembek (Kazakhstan) Beibit Zhukayev (Uzbekistan) Khumoyun Sultanov (Belarus) Mikalai Haliak
October 25	Portimão, Portugal; Hard; M25; Singles and Doubles Draws	(Germany) Sebastian Fanselow; 6–1, 6–7^{(3–7)}, 6–4	(United Kingdom) Paul Jubb	(France) Laurent Lokoli (Austria) Maximilian Neuchrist	(Chinese Taipei) Tseng Chun-hsin (Italy) Matteo Arnaldi (Cyprus) Petros Chrysochos (Ukraine) Vladyslav Orlov
October 25	Portimão, Portugal; Hard; M25; Singles and Doubles Draws	(Germany) Sebastian Fanselow (Austria) Maximilian Neuchrist; Walkover	(Poland) Paweł Ciaś (Portugal) Gonçalo Falcão	(France) Laurent Lokoli (Austria) Maximilian Neuchrist	(Chinese Taipei) Tseng Chun-hsin (Italy) Matteo Arnaldi (Cyprus) Petros Chrysochos (Ukraine) Vladyslav Orlov
October 25	Calabasas, United States; Hard; M25; Singles and Doubles Draws	(Australia) Rinky Hijikata; 3–6, 7–5, 6–2	(United States) Tristan Boyer	(United States) Nathan Ponwith (United States) Govind Nanda	(United States) Omni Kumar (United Kingdom) Max Basing (United States) Gage Brymer (France) Jaimee Floyd Angele
October 25	Calabasas, United States; Hard; M25; Singles and Doubles Draws	(Philippines) Francis Alcantara (United States) Raymond Sarmiento; 6–4, 6–2	(Estonia) Johannes Seeman (United States) Wally Thayne	(United States) Nathan Ponwith (United States) Govind Nanda	(United States) Omni Kumar (United Kingdom) Max Basing (United States) Gage Brymer (France) Jaimee Floyd Angele
October 25	Sharm El Sheikh, Egypt; Hard; M15; Singles and Doubles Draws	(Vietnam) Lý Hoàng Nam; 6–2, 6–4	(Lebanon) Hady Habib	(Egypt) Karim-Mohamed Maamoun (Canada) Kelsey Stevenson	(Cyprus) Menelaos Efstathiou (Italy) Francesco Vilardo (Italy) Marco Miceli (Egypt) Amr Asrawy
October 25	Sharm El Sheikh, Egypt; Hard; M15; Singles and Doubles Draws	(Belgium) Loïc Cloes (Czech Republic) Ondřej Horák; 5–7, 7–5, [10–8]	(Ukraine) Illya Beloborodko (Ukraine) Volodymyr Uzhylovskyi	(Egypt) Karim-Mohamed Maamoun (Canada) Kelsey Stevenson	(Cyprus) Menelaos Efstathiou (Italy) Francesco Vilardo (Italy) Marco Miceli (Egypt) Amr Asrawy
October 25	Pärnu, Estonia; Hard (indoor); M15; Singles and Doubles Draws	(Switzerland) Rémy Bertola; 6–4, 6–3	(Finland) Patrik Niklas-Salminen	(Romania) Ștefan Paloși (Estonia) Vladimir Ivanov	(Estonia) Kenneth Raisma (Poland) Yann Wójcik (Finland) Iiro Vasa (Germany) Oscar Moraing
October 25	Pärnu, Estonia; Hard (indoor); M15; Singles and Doubles Draws	(Sweden) Filip Bergevi (Finland) Patrik Niklas-Salminen; 4–6, 7–6^{(7–4)}, [10–8]	(Estonia) Vladimir Ivanov (Estonia) Kenneth Raisma	(Romania) Ștefan Paloși (Estonia) Vladimir Ivanov	(Estonia) Kenneth Raisma (Poland) Yann Wójcik (Finland) Iiro Vasa (Germany) Oscar Moraing
October 25	Selva Gardena, Italy; Hard (indoor); M15; Singles and Doubles Draws	(Switzerland) Leandro Riedi; 7–6^{(7–1)}, 3–6, 6–3	(Italy) Samuel Vincent Ruggeri	(Italy) Mattia Bellucci (Germany) Tim Handel	(Germany) Niklas Schell (Italy) Luca Potenza (Italy) Matteo Gigante (Italy) Giacomo Dambrosi
October 25	Selva Gardena, Italy; Hard (indoor); M15; Singles and Doubles Draws	(Italy) Mattia Bellucci (Italy) Luca Potenza; 6–3, 7–6^{(9–7)}	(Italy) Marco Brugnerotto (Italy) Luigi Sorrentino	(Italy) Mattia Bellucci (Germany) Tim Handel	(Germany) Niklas Schell (Italy) Luca Potenza (Italy) Matteo Gigante (Italy) Giacomo Dambrosi
October 25	Madrid, Spain; Clay; M15; Singles and Doubles Draws	(Spain) Daniel Mérida; 6–4, 6–3	(Spain) Diego Augusto Barreto Sánchez	(France) Lucas Bouquet (Hong Kong) Coleman Wong	(France) Maxime Chazal (Spain) Francisco Andreu García (Spain) Mario Mansilla Díez (Lithuania) Vilius Gaubas
October 25	Madrid, Spain; Clay; M15; Singles and Doubles Draws	(Spain) Carlos López Montagud (Italy) Francesco Passaro; 6–0, 6–3	(France) Lucas Bouquet (North Macedonia) Stefan Micov	(France) Lucas Bouquet (Hong Kong) Coleman Wong	(France) Maxime Chazal (Spain) Francisco Andreu García (Spain) Mario Mansilla Díez (Lithuania) Vilius Gaubas
October 25	Monastir, Tunisia; Hard; M15; Singles and Doubles Draws	(Tunisia) Skander Mansouri; 6–2, 6–4	(Australia) Moerani Bouzige	(France) Quentin Folliot (France) Sascha Gueymard Wayenburg	(Serbia) Viktor Jović (Australia) James McCabe (Spain) Daniel Rincón (Belgium) Simon Beaupain
October 25	Monastir, Tunisia; Hard; M15; Singles and Doubles Draws	(Switzerland) Mirko Martinez (New Zealand) Ajeet Rai; 6–4, 1–6, [10–8]	(France) Théo Arribagé (France) Axel Garcian	(France) Quentin Folliot (France) Sascha Gueymard Wayenburg	(Serbia) Viktor Jović (Australia) James McCabe (Spain) Daniel Rincón (Belgium) Simon Beaupain
October 25	Antalya, Turkey; Clay; M15; Singles and Doubles Draws	(United Kingdom) Billy Harris; 6–3, 1–6, 7–5	(United Kingdom) Felix Gill	(Argentina) Juan Pablo Paz (Romania) Călin Manda	(United Kingdom) Jack Pinnington Jones (Montenegro) Rrezart Cungu (Germany) Timo Stodder (Austria) Lukas Neumayer
October 25	Antalya, Turkey; Clay; M15; Singles and Doubles Draws	(Germany) Timo Stodder (Switzerland) Damien Wenger; 6–1, 6–2	(Hungary) Péter Nagy (Argentina) Juan Pablo Paz	(Argentina) Juan Pablo Paz (Romania) Călin Manda	(United Kingdom) Jack Pinnington Jones (Montenegro) Rrezart Cungu (Germany) Timo Stodder (Austria) Lukas Neumayer
October 25	Tallahassee, United States; Hard (indoor); M15; Singles and Doubles Draws	(United States) Vasil Kirkov; 4–6, 6–1, 6–2	(Denmark) Johannes Ingildsen	(United States) Ryan Shane (United Kingdom) Henry Patten	(France) Antoine Cornut-Chauvinc (Argentina) Matías Franco Descotte (United States) Ben Shelton (Japan) Sho Shimabukuro
October 25	Tallahassee, United States; Hard (indoor); M15; Singles and Doubles Draws	(Canada) Liam Draxl (United States) John McNally; 6–2, 6–3	(Australia) Thomas Fancutt (Northern Mariana Islands) Colin Sinclair	(United States) Ryan Shane (United Kingdom) Henry Patten	(France) Antoine Cornut-Chauvinc (Argentina) Matías Franco Descotte (United States) Ben Shelton (Japan) Sho Shimabukuro

=== November ===
Week of	Tournament	Winner	Runners-up	Semifinalists	Quarterfinalists
November 1	Saint-Dizier, France; Hard (indoor); M25; Singles and Doubles Draws	(Australia) Li Tu; 1–6, 6–1, 6–4	(Australia) Dane Sweeny	(France) Antoine Escoffier (Germany) Louis Wessels	(Australia) Tristan Schoolkate (France) Hugo Pontico (France) Tak Khunn Wang (Australia) Blake Ellis
November 1	Saint-Dizier, France; Hard (indoor); M25; Singles and Doubles Draws	(Bulgaria) Alexander Donski (Greece) Petros Tsitsipas; 6–4, 4–6, [10–7]	(Australia) Blake Ellis (Australia) Tristan Schoolkate	(France) Antoine Escoffier (Germany) Louis Wessels	(Australia) Tristan Schoolkate (France) Hugo Pontico (France) Tak Khunn Wang (Australia) Blake Ellis
November 1	Meitar, Israel; Hard; M25; Singles and Doubles Draws	(Israel) Yshai Oliel; 6–2, 6–4	(United Kingdom) Stuart Parker	(Italy) Jacopo Berrettini (Canada) Filip Peliwo	(Greece) Michail Pervolarakis (France) Dan Added (Israel) Edan Leshem (Belgium) Arnaud Bovy
November 1	Meitar, Israel; Hard; M25; Singles and Doubles Draws	(Finland) Eero Vasa (Finland) Iiro Vasa; 6–1, 7–6^{(7–3)}	(Japan) Naoki Nakagawa (Japan) Rio Noguchi	(Italy) Jacopo Berrettini (Canada) Filip Peliwo	(Greece) Michail Pervolarakis (France) Dan Added (Israel) Edan Leshem (Belgium) Arnaud Bovy
November 1	Brasília, Brazil; Clay (indoor); M15; Singles and Doubles Draws	(Brazil) Gustavo Heide; 2–6, 6–0, 6–4	(Brazil) Oscar José Gutierrez	(Brazil) Marcelo Zormann (Peru) Arklon Huertas del Pino	(Brazil) Luís Britto (Brazil) Eduardo Ribeiro (Peru) Conner Huertas del Pino (Brazil) Christian Oliveira
November 1	Brasília, Brazil; Clay (indoor); M15; Singles and Doubles Draws	(Chile) Miguel Fernando Pereira (Brazil) Gabriel Roveri Sidney; 6–7^{(3–7)}, 7–6^{(7–5)}, [10–7]	(Brazil) Wilson Leite (Brazil) Eduardo Ribeiro	(Brazil) Marcelo Zormann (Peru) Arklon Huertas del Pino	(Brazil) Luís Britto (Brazil) Eduardo Ribeiro (Peru) Conner Huertas del Pino (Brazil) Christian Oliveira
November 1	Sharm El Sheikh, Egypt; Hard; M15; Singles and Doubles Draws	(Czech Republic) Marek Gengel; 6–7^{(6–8)}, 6–2, 6–3	(Italy) Daniele Capecchi	(Ukraine) Illya Beloborodko (Vietnam) Lý Hoàng Nam	(Italy) Emiliano Maggioli (United Kingdom) Oscar Weightman (Italy) Marco Miceli (Cyprus) Menelaos Efstathiou
November 1	Sharm El Sheikh, Egypt; Hard; M15; Singles and Doubles Draws	(Belgium) Loïc Cloes (Czech Republic) Ondřej Horák; 2–6, 6–4, [10–5]	(Italy) Emiliano Maggioli (Ukraine) Oleksandr Ovcharenko	(Ukraine) Illya Beloborodko (Vietnam) Lý Hoàng Nam	(Italy) Emiliano Maggioli (United Kingdom) Oscar Weightman (Italy) Marco Miceli (Cyprus) Menelaos Efstathiou
November 1	Heraklion, Greece; Hard; M15; Singles and Doubles Draws	(United States) Kyle Seelig; 6–1, 7–5	(United Kingdom) Ryan James Storrie	(Sweden) Markus Eriksson (Hungary) Péter Fajta	(Austria) Jonas Trinker (Australia) Matthew Romios (Greece) Aristotelis Thanos (Estonia) Mark Lajal
November 1	Heraklion, Greece; Hard; M15; Singles and Doubles Draws	(Sweden) Markus Eriksson (Australia) Matthew Romios; 3–6, 7–6^{(7–5)}, [10–0]	(Hungary) Péter Fajta (Hungary) Zsombor Velcz	(Sweden) Markus Eriksson (Hungary) Péter Fajta	(Austria) Jonas Trinker (Australia) Matthew Romios (Greece) Aristotelis Thanos (Estonia) Mark Lajal
November 1	Torelló, Spain; Hard; M15; Singles and Doubles Draws	(Spain) John Echeverría; 7–6^{(9–7)}, 6–4	(Italy) Marco Brugnerotto	(France) Lilian Marmousez (France) Louis Dussin	(Zimbabwe) Benjamin Lock (Spain) Mario Mansilla Díez (Greece) Stefanos Sakellaridis (Finland) Patrik Niklas-Salminen
November 1	Torelló, Spain; Hard; M15; Singles and Doubles Draws	(United Kingdom) Jonathan Gray (Poland) Yann Wójcik; 3–6, 7–5, [10–5]	(Italy) Marco Brugnerotto (Italy) Luigi Sorrentino	(France) Lilian Marmousez (France) Louis Dussin	(Zimbabwe) Benjamin Lock (Spain) Mario Mansilla Díez (Greece) Stefanos Sakellaridis (Finland) Patrik Niklas-Salminen
November 1	Monastir, Tunisia; Hard; M15; Singles and Doubles Draws	(Tunisia) Moez Echargui; 6–1, 6–2	(France) Clément Tabur	(Tunisia) Skander Mansouri (Germany) Christoph Negritu	(Italy) Omar Giacalone (Netherlands) Guy den Ouden (France) Térence Atmane (France) Ugo Blanchet
November 1	Monastir, Tunisia; Hard; M15; Singles and Doubles Draws	(Switzerland) Mirko Martinez (New Zealand) Ajeet Rai; 3–6, 7–6^{(7–5)}, [10–8]	(Belgium) Pierre Yves Bailly (Belgium) Martin Katz	(Tunisia) Skander Mansouri (Germany) Christoph Negritu	(Italy) Omar Giacalone (Netherlands) Guy den Ouden (France) Térence Atmane (France) Ugo Blanchet
November 1	Antalya, Turkey; Clay; M15; Singles and Doubles Draws	(Argentina) Juan Pablo Paz; 6–2, 1–6, 6–0	(Russia) Andrey Chepelev	(Romania) Bogdan Ionuț Apostol (Italy) Alexander Weis	(Argentina) Fermín Tenti (Chile) Bastián Malla (Austria) Lukas Neumayer (Romania) Alexandru Jecan
November 1	Antalya, Turkey; Clay; M15; Singles and Doubles Draws	(Romania) Nicolae Frunză (Romania) Alexandru Jecan; 4–6, 6–3, [10–6]	(Turkey) Berk İlkel (Turkey) S Mert Özdemir	(Romania) Bogdan Ionuț Apostol (Italy) Alexander Weis	(Argentina) Fermín Tenti (Chile) Bastián Malla (Austria) Lukas Neumayer (Romania) Alexandru Jecan
November 1	Ithaca, United States; Hard (indoor); M15; Singles and Doubles Draws	(United Kingdom) Luke Johnson; 3–6, 6–4, 7–6^{(8–6)}	(United States) Cannon Kingsley	(United States) Felix Corwin (United States) Vasil Kirkov	(United States) Axel Nefve (United States) Roy Smith (United States) Nico Mostardi (United States) Evan Bynoe
November 1	Ithaca, United States; Hard (indoor); M15; Singles and Doubles Draws	(United Kingdom) Luke Johnson (United States) Vasil Kirkov; 7–6^{(7–3)}, 6–3	(Luxembourg) Alex Knaff (Canada) Joshua Peck	(United States) Felix Corwin (United States) Vasil Kirkov	(United States) Axel Nefve (United States) Roy Smith (United States) Nico Mostardi (United States) Evan Bynoe
November 1	Fayetteville, United States; Hard; M15; Singles and Doubles Draws	(United Kingdom) Henry Patten; 7–6^{(7–2)}, 6–3	(United States) Alfredo Perez	(United States) Keegan Smith (United Kingdom) Charles Broom	(Portugal) Daniel Rodrigues (Czech Republic) Tadeáš Paroulek (United States) Bruno Kuzuhara (Japan) Sho Shimabukuro
November 1	Fayetteville, United States; Hard; M15; Singles and Doubles Draws	(United States) George Goldhoff (Czech Republic) Tadeáš Paroulek; 6–4, 6–2	(United Kingdom) Charles Broom (United Kingdom) Henry Patten	(United States) Keegan Smith (United Kingdom) Charles Broom	(Portugal) Daniel Rodrigues (Czech Republic) Tadeáš Paroulek (United States) Bruno Kuzuhara (Japan) Sho Shimabukuro
November 8	Aparecida de Goiânia, Brazil; Clay; M25; Singles and Doubles Draws	(Brazil) Oscar José Gutierrez; 6–0, 6–4	(Brazil) Daniel Dutra da Silva	(Brazil) Gustavo Heide (Brazil) Igor Marcondes	(Argentina) Leonardo Aboian (Brazil) Mateus Alves (Brazil) João Lucas Reis da Silva (Argentina) Matías Zukas
November 8	Aparecida de Goiânia, Brazil; Clay; M25; Singles and Doubles Draws	(Brazil) Daniel Dutra da Silva (Brazil) Gustavo Heide; 6–3, 6–3	(Colombia) Alejandro González (Argentina) Matías Zukas	(Brazil) Gustavo Heide (Brazil) Igor Marcondes	(Argentina) Leonardo Aboian (Brazil) Mateus Alves (Brazil) João Lucas Reis da Silva (Argentina) Matías Zukas
November 8	Villers-lès-Nancy, France; Hard (indoor); M25; Singles and Doubles Draws	(France) Antoine Escoffier; 6–4, 6–4	(Austria) Maximilian Neuchrist	(France) Valentin Royer (France) Maxence Brovillé	(France) Hugo Pontico (Japan) Yuta Shimizu (Australia) Tristan Schoolkate (Australia) Blake Ellis
November 8	Villers-lès-Nancy, France; Hard (indoor); M25; Singles and Doubles Draws	(Bulgaria) Alexander Donski (Greece) Petros Tsitsipas; 7–6^{(7–2)}, 3–2, ret.	(Australia) Blake Ellis (Australia) Tristan Schoolkate	(France) Valentin Royer (France) Maxence Brovillé	(France) Hugo Pontico (Japan) Yuta Shimizu (Australia) Tristan Schoolkate (Australia) Blake Ellis
November 8	Afula, Israel; Hard; M25; Singles and Doubles Draws	(Japan) Naoki Nakagawa; 4–6, 6–4, 6–3	(Greece) Michail Pervolarakis	(France) Dan Added (Canada) Filip Peliwo	(Israel) Yshai Oliel (Japan) Rio Noguchi (Israel) Edan Leshem (Israel) Roee Benya
November 8	Afula, Israel; Hard; M25; Singles and Doubles Draws	(Israel) Lior Goldenberg (Israel) Sahar Simon; 7–6^{(9–7)}, 2–6, [10–7]	(France) Dan Added (Israel) Daniel Cukierman	(France) Dan Added (Canada) Filip Peliwo	(Israel) Yshai Oliel (Japan) Rio Noguchi (Israel) Edan Leshem (Israel) Roee Benya
November 8	Harlingen, United States; Hard; M25; Singles and Doubles Draws	(United Kingdom) Paul Jubb; 6–2, 1–6, 7–5	(Romania) Gabi Adrian Boitan	(United States) Christian Langmo (Argentina) Matías Franco Descotte	(Mexico) Gerardo López Villaseñor (United States) Toby Kodat (United States) Strong Kirchheimer (France) Jaimee Floyd Angele
November 8	Harlingen, United States; Hard; M25; Singles and Doubles Draws	(Philippines) Francis Alcantara (United Kingdom) Mark Whitehouse; 7–6^{(7–3)}, 5–7, [10–7]	(Romania) Gabi Adrian Boitan (Germany) Constantin Frantzen	(United States) Christian Langmo (Argentina) Matías Franco Descotte	(Mexico) Gerardo López Villaseñor (United States) Toby Kodat (United States) Strong Kirchheimer (France) Jaimee Floyd Angele
November 8	Sharm El Sheikh, Egypt; Hard; M15; Singles and Doubles Draws	(Czech Republic) Marek Gengel; 6–0, 6–4	(Belgium) Loïc Cloes	(Czech Republic) Andrew Paulson (United Kingdom) Daniel Little	(Italy) Daniele Capecchi (Italy) Emiliano Maggioli (Russia) Sergei Pogosian (Georgia (country)) Saba Purtseladze
November 8	Sharm El Sheikh, Egypt; Hard; M15; Singles and Doubles Draws	(United Kingdom) Ben Jones (United Kingdom) Daniel Little; 6–4, 7–5	(Chinese Taipei) Ray Ho (Kazakhstan) Grigoriy Lomakin	(Czech Republic) Andrew Paulson (United Kingdom) Daniel Little	(Italy) Daniele Capecchi (Italy) Emiliano Maggioli (Russia) Sergei Pogosian (Georgia (country)) Saba Purtseladze
November 8	Heraklion, Greece; Hard; M15; Singles and Doubles Draws	(Italy) Francesco Maestrelli; 6–0, 3–6, 7–5	(United Kingdom) Alastair Gray	(Hungary) Péter Fajta (Estonia) Mark Lajal	(Netherlands) Alec Deckers (Germany) Kai Lemstra (France) Alexis Musialek (Netherlands) Mick Veldheer
November 8	Heraklion, Greece; Hard; M15; Singles and Doubles Draws	(Uzbekistan) Sanjar Fayziev (Greece) Markos Kalovelonis; 6–4, 6–1	(Australia) William Ma (France) Alexis Musialek	(Hungary) Péter Fajta (Estonia) Mark Lajal	(Netherlands) Alec Deckers (Germany) Kai Lemstra (France) Alexis Musialek (Netherlands) Mick Veldheer
November 8	Indore, India; Hard; M15; Singles and Doubles Draws	(India) Manish Sureshkumar; 6–4, 4–6, 6–2	(Australia) Philip Sekulic	(India) Dev Javia (India) Dalwinder Singh	(France) Nicolas Tepmahc (India) S. D. Prajwal Dev (India) Bharath Nishok Kumaran (India) Rishab Agarwal
November 8	Indore, India; Hard; M15; Singles and Doubles Draws	(India) Anirudh Chandrasekar (India) Nitin Kumar Sinha; 6–4, 6–4	(India) Niki Kaliyanda Poonacha (India) Vishnu Vardhan	(India) Dev Javia (India) Dalwinder Singh	(France) Nicolas Tepmahc (India) S. D. Prajwal Dev (India) Bharath Nishok Kumaran (India) Rishab Agarwal
November 8	Benicarló, Spain; Clay; M15; Singles and Doubles Draws	(Spain) Pablo Llamas Ruiz; 6–4, 6–4	(Russia) Ivan Gakhov	(Spain) Carlos Sánchez Jover (Switzerland) Damien Wenger	(Spain) Daniel Mérida (Spain) Imanol López Morillo (Poland) Paweł Ciaś (France) Lucas Bouquet
November 8	Benicarló, Spain; Clay; M15; Singles and Doubles Draws	(Romania) Ștefan Paloși (Spain) Carlos Sánchez Jover; 4–6, 7–6^{(9–7)}, [10–4]	(Italy) Andrea Picchione (Italy) Lorenzo Rottoli	(Spain) Carlos Sánchez Jover (Switzerland) Damien Wenger	(Spain) Daniel Mérida (Spain) Imanol López Morillo (Poland) Paweł Ciaś (France) Lucas Bouquet
November 8	Monastir, Tunisia; Hard; M15; Singles and Doubles Draws	(Belgium) Pierre Yves Bailly; 4–6, 7–6^{(7–5)}, 6–2	(Germany) Dominik Böhler	(Belgium) Gauthier Onclin (United States) Gage Brymer	(Italy) Giorgio Ricca (New Zealand) Ajeet Rai (Belgium) Simon Beaupain (France) Térence Atmane
November 8	Monastir, Tunisia; Hard; M15; Singles and Doubles Draws	(Netherlands) Jarno Jans (Netherlands) Elgin Khoeblal; 7–6^{(7–2)}, 6–1	(Belgium) Guillaume Dermiens (South Korea) Shin Woo-bin	(Belgium) Gauthier Onclin (United States) Gage Brymer	(Italy) Giorgio Ricca (New Zealand) Ajeet Rai (Belgium) Simon Beaupain (France) Térence Atmane
November 8	Antalya, Turkey; Clay; M15; Singles and Doubles Draws	(Chile) Bastián Malla; 6–0, 6–1	(Romania) Cezar Crețu	(Sweden) Dragoș Nicolae Mădăraș (Romania) David Ionel	(United Kingdom) Toby Martin (Moldova) Ilya Snițari (Romania) Bogdan Ionuț Apostol (Austria) Lukas Neumayer
November 8	Antalya, Turkey; Clay; M15; Singles and Doubles Draws	(Hungary) Gergely Madarász (Hungary) Péter Nagy; 6–2, 6–2	(Russia) Danil Spasibo (Russia) Pavel Verbin	(Sweden) Dragoș Nicolae Mădăraș (Romania) David Ionel	(United Kingdom) Toby Martin (Moldova) Ilya Snițari (Romania) Bogdan Ionuț Apostol (Austria) Lukas Neumayer
November 15	Austin, United States; Hard; M25; Singles and Doubles Draws	(United States) Zachary Svajda; 6–4, 4–6, 6–4	(United States) Eduardo Nava	(United States) Colin Markes (United States) Eliot Spizzirri	(South Africa) Philip Henning (Syria) Kareem Al Allaf (Dominican Republic) Peter Bertran (Luxembourg) Chris Rodesch
November 15	Austin, United States; Hard; M25; Singles and Doubles Draws	(United States) Alfredo Perez (Portugal) Duarte Vale; 7–6^{(7–1)}, 6–2	(South Africa) Philip Henning (South Africa) Joubert Klopper	(United States) Colin Markes (United States) Eliot Spizzirri	(South Africa) Philip Henning (Syria) Kareem Al Allaf (Dominican Republic) Peter Bertran (Luxembourg) Chris Rodesch
November 15	Columbus, United States; Hard (indoor); M25; Singles and Doubles Draws	(United States) John McNally; 4–6, 7–6^{(7–2)}, 6–3	(United States) James Tracy	(United States) Cannon Kingsley (Canada) Taha Baadi	(Japan) James Kent Trotter (United States) Robert Cash (United States) Alafia Ayeni (United States) Toby Kodat
November 15	Columbus, United States; Hard (indoor); M25; Singles and Doubles Draws	(Switzerland) Adrien Burdet (Switzerland) Leandro Riedi; 7–6^{(7–5)}, 7–6^{(7–2)}	(United States) Robert Cash (United States) James Tracy	(United States) Cannon Kingsley (Canada) Taha Baadi	(Japan) James Kent Trotter (United States) Robert Cash (United States) Alafia Ayeni (United States) Toby Kodat
November 15	Cochabamba, Bolivia; Clay; M15; Singles and Doubles Draws	(Argentina) Tomás Farjat; 6–4, 7–6^{(7–5)}	(Peru) Jorge Panta	(Argentina) Matías Zukas (Argentina) Valerio Aboian	(United States) Dali Blanch (Bolivia) Murkel Dellien (Argentina) Juan Bautista Otegui (Bolivia) Luis Molina
November 15	Cochabamba, Bolivia; Clay; M15; Singles and Doubles Draws	(Bolivia) Boris Arias (Venezuela) Brandon Pérez; 3–6, 6–1, [10–5]	(United States) Dali Blanch (Peru) Jorge Panta	(Argentina) Matías Zukas (Argentina) Valerio Aboian	(United States) Dali Blanch (Bolivia) Murkel Dellien (Argentina) Juan Bautista Otegui (Bolivia) Luis Molina
November 15	Cundinamarca, Colombia; Clay; M15; Singles and Doubles Draws	(Chile) Michel Vernier; 6–3, 3–6, 6–1	(Chile) Daniel Antonio Núñez	(Colombia) Alejandro Hoyos Franco (Colombia) Johan Alexander Rodríguez Rodríguez	(Argentina) Matías Franco Descotte (Argentina) Federico Agustín Gómez (United Kingdom) Blu Baker (Colombia) Mateo Gómez
November 15	Cundinamarca, Colombia; Clay; M15; Singles and Doubles Draws	(Argentina) Federico Agustín Gómez (Colombia) Juan Sebastián Osorio; 7–6^{(7–5)}, 7–6^{(9–7)}	(Chile) Daniel Antonio Núñez (Chile) Sebastián Santibañez	(Colombia) Alejandro Hoyos Franco (Colombia) Johan Alexander Rodríguez Rodríguez	(Argentina) Matías Franco Descotte (Argentina) Federico Agustín Gómez (United Kingdom) Blu Baker (Colombia) Mateo Gómez
November 15	Opava, Czech Republic; Carpet (indoor); M15; Singles and Doubles Draws	(Czech Republic) David Poljak; 6–3, 7–6^{(7–5)}	(Germany) Marvin Möller	(France) Sean Cuenin (Russia) Savriyan Danilov	(Czech Republic) Andrew Paulson (Slovakia) Lukáš Pokorný (Slovakia) Miloš Karol (Germany) Henri Squire
November 15	Opava, Czech Republic; Carpet (indoor); M15; Singles and Doubles Draws	(Poland) Michał Dembek (Czech Republic) Petr Nouza; 5–7, 6–4, [10–8]	(United Kingdom) Scott Duncan (Czech Republic) Dominik Kellovský	(France) Sean Cuenin (Russia) Savriyan Danilov	(Czech Republic) Andrew Paulson (Slovakia) Lukáš Pokorný (Slovakia) Miloš Karol (Germany) Henri Squire
November 15	Sharm El Sheikh, Egypt; Hard; M15; Singles and Doubles Draws	(Hungary) Péter Fajta; 6–4, 6–2	(Italy) Francesco Vilardo	(Chinese Taipei) Lee Kuan-yi (South Korea) Lee Duck-hee	(France) Cyril Vandermeersch (Germany) Timo Stodder (Germany) Sebastian Prechtel (Chinese Taipei) Lo Chien-hsun
November 15	Sharm El Sheikh, Egypt; Hard; M15; Singles and Doubles Draws	(United Kingdom) Ben Jones (United Kingdom) Daniel Little; 6–3, 6–2	(Austria) Neil Oberleitner (Ukraine) Volodymyr Uzhylovskyi	(Chinese Taipei) Lee Kuan-yi (South Korea) Lee Duck-hee	(France) Cyril Vandermeersch (Germany) Timo Stodder (Germany) Sebastian Prechtel (Chinese Taipei) Lo Chien-hsun
November 15	Heraklion, Greece; Hard; M15; Singles and Doubles Draws	(Romania) Filip Jianu; 6–2, 6–4	(Sweden) Filip Bergevi	(United States) Michael Zhu (Romania) David Ionel	(Austria) Lukas Krainer (United Kingdom) Ryan James Storrie (Netherlands) Mick Veldheer (Netherlands) Dax Donders
November 15	Heraklion, Greece; Hard; M15; Singles and Doubles Draws	(Germany) Kai Lemstra (Australia) Matthew Romios; 4–6, 6–3, [12–10]	(Sweden) Filip Bergevi (Germany) Kai Wehnelt	(United States) Michael Zhu (Romania) David Ionel	(Austria) Lukas Krainer (United Kingdom) Ryan James Storrie (Netherlands) Mick Veldheer (Netherlands) Dax Donders
November 15	New Delhi, India; Hard; M15; Singles and Doubles Draws	(France) Valentin Vacherot; 5–7, 6–2, 7–6^{(7–3)}	(Australia) Philip Sekulic	(India) Vishnu Vardhan (India) Sidharth Rawat	(India) Nitin Kumar Sinha (India) Abhinav Sanjeev Shanmugam (India) Dev Javia (India) Niki Kaliyanda Poonacha
November 15	New Delhi, India; Hard; M15; Singles and Doubles Draws	(India) Saketh Myneni (India) Vishnu Vardhan; 6–3, 3–6, [13–11]	(United Kingdom) Julian Cash (Hungary) Zsombor Velcz	(India) Vishnu Vardhan (India) Sidharth Rawat	(India) Nitin Kumar Sinha (India) Abhinav Sanjeev Shanmugam (India) Dev Javia (India) Niki Kaliyanda Poonacha
November 15	Nules, Spain; Clay; M15; Singles and Doubles Draws	(Switzerland) Damien Wenger; 6–1, 6–2	(Italy) Andrea Picchione	(Spain) Diego Augusto Barreto Sánchez (Romania) Ștefan Paloși	(Argentina) Franco Emanuel Egea (Italy) Lorenzo Bocchi (Spain) Carlos Sánchez Jover (Spain) Imanol López Morillo
November 15	Nules, Spain; Clay; M15; Singles and Doubles Draws	(Switzerland) Louroi Martinez (Switzerland) Damien Wenger; 7–6^{(7–2)}, 6–3	(Spain) John Echeverría (Spain) Mario Mansilla Díez	(Spain) Diego Augusto Barreto Sánchez (Romania) Ștefan Paloși	(Argentina) Franco Emanuel Egea (Italy) Lorenzo Bocchi (Spain) Carlos Sánchez Jover (Spain) Imanol López Morillo
November 15	Monastir, Tunisia; Hard; M15; Singles and Doubles Draws	(Australia) Moerani Bouzige; 7–5, 6–4	(France) Mathys Erhard	(Tunisia) Aziz Dougaz (Brazil) Gabriel Décamps	(Australia) James McCabe (Tunisia) Moez Echargui (Belgium) Simon Beaupain (Poland) Maks Kaśnikowski
November 15	Monastir, Tunisia; Hard; M15; Singles and Doubles Draws	(Netherlands) Jarno Jans (Netherlands) Elgin Khoeblal; 6–3, 6–4	(France) Martin Breysach (France) Pierre Delage	(Tunisia) Aziz Dougaz (Brazil) Gabriel Décamps	(Australia) James McCabe (Tunisia) Moez Echargui (Belgium) Simon Beaupain (Poland) Maks Kaśnikowski
November 15	Antalya, Turkey; Clay; M15; Singles and Doubles Draws	(Poland) Daniel Michalski; 2–6, 6–1, 6–3	(United Kingdom) Billy Harris	(Romania) Bogdan Ionuț Apostol (Sweden) Dragoș Nicolae Mădăraș	(Romania) Cezar Crețu (Romania) Alexandru Jecan (Turkey) Yankı Erel (Poland) Olaf Pieczkowski
November 15	Antalya, Turkey; Clay; M15; Singles and Doubles Draws	(Romania) Cezar Crețu (Romania) Alexandru Jecan; 3–6, 7–5, [10–6]	(Romania) Bogdan Ionuț Apostol (Romania) Bogdan Borza	(Romania) Bogdan Ionuț Apostol (Sweden) Dragoș Nicolae Mădăraș	(Romania) Cezar Crețu (Romania) Alexandru Jecan (Turkey) Yankı Erel (Poland) Olaf Pieczkowski
November 15	East Lansing, United States; Hard (indoor); M15; Singles and Doubles Draws	(United States) Raymond Sarmiento; 4–6, 6–3, 6–4	(Canada) Gabriel Diallo	(United States) Alexander Brown (Luxembourg) Alex Knaff	(Romania) Sebastian Gima (Germany) Nino Ehrenschneider (Northern Mariana Islands) Colin Sinclair (United States) Matt Kuhar
November 15	East Lansing, United States; Hard (indoor); M15; Singles and Doubles Draws	(United States) Chad Kissell (United States) Joshua Sheehy; 6–4, 6–2	(United States) Ozan Colak (United States) Jackson Winkler	(United States) Alexander Brown (Luxembourg) Alex Knaff	(Romania) Sebastian Gima (Germany) Nino Ehrenschneider (Northern Mariana Islands) Colin Sinclair (United States) Matt Kuhar
November 22	Córdoba, Argentina; Clay; M15; Singles and Doubles Draws	(Argentina) Juan Bautista Torres; 6–2, 6–2	(Argentina) Francisco Comesaña	(Argentina) Alejo Lorenzo Lingua Lavallén (Argentina) Juan Bautista Otegui	(Argentina) Franco Emanuel Egea (Argentina) Mariano Navone (Argentina) Tomás Farjat (Uruguay) Ignacio Carou
November 22	Córdoba, Argentina; Clay; M15; Singles and Doubles Draws	(Uruguay) Ignacio Carou (Argentina) Alejo Lorenzo Lingua Lavallén; 6–4, 5–7, [10–4]	(Bolivia) Boris Arias (Bolivia) Murkel Dellien	(Argentina) Alejo Lorenzo Lingua Lavallén (Argentina) Juan Bautista Otegui	(Argentina) Franco Emanuel Egea (Argentina) Mariano Navone (Argentina) Tomás Farjat (Uruguay) Ignacio Carou
November 22	Ostrava, Czech Republic; Hard (indoor); M15; Singles and Doubles Draws	(Czech Republic) Andrew Paulson; 6–3, 7–6^{(8–6)}	(Germany) Marvin Möller	(Switzerland) Rémy Bertola (Czech Republic) Martin Krumich	(Czech Republic) David Poljak (Belgium) Buvaysar Gadamauri (Poland) Michał Dembek (Czech Republic) Adam Pavlásek
November 22	Ostrava, Czech Republic; Hard (indoor); M15; Singles and Doubles Draws	(Czech Republic) Filip Duda (Czech Republic) Adam Pavlásek; 6–4, 6–4	(Slovakia) Miloš Karol (Slovakia) Lukáš Pokorný	(Switzerland) Rémy Bertola (Czech Republic) Martin Krumich	(Czech Republic) David Poljak (Belgium) Buvaysar Gadamauri (Poland) Michał Dembek (Czech Republic) Adam Pavlásek
November 22	Cairo, Egypt; Clay; M15; Singles and Doubles Draws	(United Kingdom) Felix Gill; 7–6^{(7–4)}, 6–2	(Italy) Gianluca Acquaroli	(United Kingdom) Jonathan Gray (Italy) Simone Roncalli	(South Korea) Lee Duck-hee (Italy) Edoardo Zanada (Thailand) Maximus Jones (France) Matthieu Perchicot
November 22	Cairo, Egypt; Clay; M15; Singles and Doubles Draws	(United Kingdom) Jonathan Gray (France) Nathan Seateun; 6–3, 4–6, [10–6]	(Egypt) Amr Asrawy (Egypt) Sherif Makhlouf	(United Kingdom) Jonathan Gray (Italy) Simone Roncalli	(South Korea) Lee Duck-hee (Italy) Edoardo Zanada (Thailand) Maximus Jones (France) Matthieu Perchicot
November 22	Heraklion, Greece; Hard; M15; Singles and Doubles Draws	(United Kingdom) Jack Pinnington Jones; 7–6^{(7–3)}, 6–1	(Romania) David Ionel	(Germany) Kai Wehnelt (United Kingdom) Charles Broom	(Australia) Dane Sweeny (United Kingdom) Arthur Fery (Spain) Daniel Rincón (United Kingdom) Alastair Gray
November 22	Heraklion, Greece; Hard; M15; Singles and Doubles Draws	(Sweden) Filip Bergevi (Germany) Kai Wehnelt; 7–6^{(10–8)}, 4–6, [10–7]	(South Korea) Park Ui-sung (United Kingdom) Harry Wendelken	(Germany) Kai Wehnelt (United Kingdom) Charles Broom	(Australia) Dane Sweeny (United Kingdom) Arthur Fery (Spain) Daniel Rincón (United Kingdom) Alastair Gray
November 22	Guatemala City, Guatemala; Hard; M15; Singles and Doubles Draws	(Northern Mariana Islands) Colin Sinclair; 6–1, 5–7, 6–4	(Italy) Marco Brugnerotto	(Colombia) Alejandro Hoyos Franco (Canada) Taha Baadi	(Venezuela) Ricardo Rodríguez-Pace (Chinese Taipei) Chen Kuan-yu (Bolivia) Alejandro Mendoza (Colombia) Nicolás Buitrago
November 22	Guatemala City, Guatemala; Hard; M15; Singles and Doubles Draws	(Venezuela) Brandon Pérez (Venezuela) Ricardo Rodríguez-Pace; 7–6^{(7–0)}, 6–4	(Colombia) José Daniel Bendeck (Colombia) Andrés Urrea	(Colombia) Alejandro Hoyos Franco (Canada) Taha Baadi	(Venezuela) Ricardo Rodríguez-Pace (Chinese Taipei) Chen Kuan-yu (Bolivia) Alejandro Mendoza (Colombia) Nicolás Buitrago
November 22	Gurugram, India; Hard; M15; Singles and Doubles Draws	(Hungary) Zsombor Velcz; 6–3, 6–2	(United States) Dusty Boyer	(India) Ishaque Eqbal (India) Nitin Kumar Sinha	(India) Sidharth Rawat (India) Manish Sureshkumar (United Kingdom) Julian Cash (France) Nicolas Tepmahc
November 22	Gurugram, India; Hard; M15; Singles and Doubles Draws	(India) Yuki Bhambri (India) Saketh Myneni; 6–4, 7–6^{(8–6)}	(India) S. D. Prajwal Dev (India) Rishi Reddy	(India) Ishaque Eqbal (India) Nitin Kumar Sinha	(India) Sidharth Rawat (India) Manish Sureshkumar (United Kingdom) Julian Cash (France) Nicolas Tepmahc
November 22	Cancún, Mexico; Hard; M15; Singles and Doubles Draws	(Vietnam) Lý Hoàng Nam; 6–4, 6–4	(United Kingdom) Giles Hussey	(Japan) Makoto Ochi (United States) Dali Blanch	(Mexico) Alan Fernando Rubio Fierros (France) Constantin Bittoun Kouzmine (Slovenia) Matic Špec (Costa Rica) Jesse Flores
November 22	Cancún, Mexico; Hard; M15; Singles and Doubles Draws	(United States) Chad Kissell (United States) Joshua Sheehy; 2–6, 7–5, [10–7]	(France) Constantin Bittoun Kouzmine (Mexico) Alan Fernando Rubio Fierros	(Japan) Makoto Ochi (United States) Dali Blanch	(Mexico) Alan Fernando Rubio Fierros (France) Constantin Bittoun Kouzmine (Slovenia) Matic Špec (Costa Rica) Jesse Flores
November 22	Kazan, Russia; Hard (indoor); M15; Singles and Doubles Draws	(Russia) Alibek Kachmazov; 6–2, 6–2	(Belarus) Martin Borisiouk	(Belarus) Alexander Zgirovsky (Russia) Savriyan Danilov	(Russia) Bekhan Atlangeriev (Serbia) Boris Butulija (Belarus) Erik Arutiunian (Russia) Timur Kiyamov
November 22	Kazan, Russia; Hard (indoor); M15; Singles and Doubles Draws	(Russia) Egor Agafonov (Russia) Daniel Ibragimov; 6–2, 6–3	(Russia) Alexandr Binda (Russia) Pavel Verbin	(Belarus) Alexander Zgirovsky (Russia) Savriyan Danilov	(Russia) Bekhan Atlangeriev (Serbia) Boris Butulija (Belarus) Erik Arutiunian (Russia) Timur Kiyamov
November 22	Monastir, Tunisia; Hard; M15; Singles and Doubles Draws	(Netherlands) Guy den Ouden; 6–3, 6–4	(Brazil) Gabriel Décamps	(Poland) Martyn Pawelski (Poland) Maks Kaśnikowski	(Italy) Luigi Sorrentino (France) Térence Atmane (France) Mathys Erhard (Spain) Adrià Soriano Barrera
November 22	Monastir, Tunisia; Hard; M15; Singles and Doubles Draws	(France) César Bourgois (France) Martin Breysach; 6–4, 6–4	(Chile) Diego Fernández Flores (Spain) Adrià Soriano Barrera	(Poland) Martyn Pawelski (Poland) Maks Kaśnikowski	(Italy) Luigi Sorrentino (France) Térence Atmane (France) Mathys Erhard (Spain) Adrià Soriano Barrera
November 22	Antalya, Turkey; Clay; M15; Singles and Doubles Draws	(Poland) Daniel Michalski; 7–6^{(7–2)}, 6–2	(Romania) Cezar Crețu	(Romania) Alexandru Jecan (Germany) Lucas Gerch	(Sweden) Dragoș Nicolae Mădăraș (Romania) Bogdan Ionuț Apostol (Portugal) Luís Faria (Turkey) Marsel İlhan
November 22	Antalya, Turkey; Clay; M15; Singles and Doubles Draws	(Romania) Cezar Crețu (Romania) Alexandru Jecan; 7–6^{(10–8)}, 6–2	(Russia) Andrey Chepelev (Russia) Igor Kudriashov	(Romania) Alexandru Jecan (Germany) Lucas Gerch	(Sweden) Dragoș Nicolae Mădăraș (Romania) Bogdan Ionuț Apostol (Portugal) Luís Faria (Turkey) Marsel İlhan
November 29	Villa Allende, Argentina; Clay; M25; Singles and Doubles Draws	(Argentina) Francisco Comesaña; 7–6^{(7–4)}, 7–6^{(7–5)}	(Argentina) Juan Pablo Paz	(Argentina) Santiago Rodríguez Taverna (Argentina) Juan Bautista Torres	(Argentina) Alejo Lorenzo Lingua Lavallén (Argentina) Mariano Navone (Argentina) Mateo Nicolás Martínez (Uruguay) Ignacio Carou
November 29	Villa Allende, Argentina; Clay; M25; Singles and Doubles Draws	(Argentina) Franco Emanuel Egea (Argentina) Gabriel Alejandro Hidalgo; 6–2, 6–1	(Argentina) Tomás Farjat (Argentina) Alejo Lorenzo Lingua Lavallén	(Argentina) Santiago Rodríguez Taverna (Argentina) Juan Bautista Torres	(Argentina) Alejo Lorenzo Lingua Lavallén (Argentina) Mariano Navone (Argentina) Mateo Nicolás Martínez (Uruguay) Ignacio Carou
November 29	Santo Domingo, Dominican Republic; Hard; M15; Singles and Doubles Draws	(Denmark) Johannes Ingildsen; 6–4, 6–3	(Peru) Jorge Panta	(Italy) Marco Brugnerotto (France) Enzo Wallart	(United States) Felix Corwin (United States) Matt Kuhar (Dominican Republic) Peter Bertran (France) Alexis Musialek
November 29	Santo Domingo, Dominican Republic; Hard; M15; Singles and Doubles Draws	(Denmark) Johannes Ingildsen (United States) Alfredo Perez; 7–6^{(7–4)}, 6–3	(France) Alexis Musialek (France) Enzo Wallart	(Italy) Marco Brugnerotto (France) Enzo Wallart	(United States) Felix Corwin (United States) Matt Kuhar (Dominican Republic) Peter Bertran (France) Alexis Musialek
November 29	Cairo, Egypt; Clay; M15; Singles and Doubles Draws	(Spain) José Francisco Vidal Azorín; 6–1, 6–2	(United Kingdom) Felix Gill	(Spain) Mario Mansilla Díez (Lebanon) Hady Habib	(Spain) Max Alcalá Gurri (Germany) Niklas Schell (Chinese Taipei) Ray Ho (Argentina) Fermín Tenti
November 29	Cairo, Egypt; Clay; M15; Singles and Doubles Draws	(Chinese Taipei) Ray Ho (Germany) Niklas Schell; 6–3, 6–1	(Spain) Mario Mansilla Díez (Spain) José Francisco Vidal Azorín	(Spain) Mario Mansilla Díez (Lebanon) Hady Habib	(Spain) Max Alcalá Gurri (Germany) Niklas Schell (Chinese Taipei) Ray Ho (Argentina) Fermín Tenti
November 29	Heraklion, Greece; Hard; M15; Singles and Doubles Draws	(United Kingdom) Charles Broom; 6–3, 6–3	(United States) Kyle Seelig	(Netherlands) Sidané Pontjodikromo (United Kingdom) Arthur Fery	(Germany) Kai Wehnelt (United Kingdom) Harry Wendelken (Cyprus) Stylianos Christodoulou (South Korea) Park Ui-sung
November 29	Heraklion, Greece; Hard; M15; Singles and Doubles Draws	(United Kingdom) Charles Broom (United Kingdom) Henry Patten; 5–7, 6–2, [10–8]	(Netherlands) Sidané Pontjodikromo (Germany) Kai Wehnelt	(Netherlands) Sidané Pontjodikromo (United Kingdom) Arthur Fery	(Germany) Kai Wehnelt (United Kingdom) Harry Wendelken (Cyprus) Stylianos Christodoulou (South Korea) Park Ui-sung
November 29	Cancún, Mexico; Hard; M15; Singles and Doubles Draws	(Vietnam) Lý Hoàng Nam; 6–4, 6–4	(New Zealand) Rubin Statham	(United States) Isaiah Strode (France) Constantin Bittoun Kouzmine	(Canada) Liam Draxl (Slovenia) Matic Špec (New Zealand) Kiranpal Pannu (Germany) Tim Handel
November 29	Cancún, Mexico; Hard; M15; Singles and Doubles Draws	(Canada) Liam Draxl (Canada) Cleeve Harper; 7–5, 7–6^{(7–4)}	(Brazil) Luís Britto (Brazil) Marcelo Zormann	(United States) Isaiah Strode (France) Constantin Bittoun Kouzmine	(Canada) Liam Draxl (Slovenia) Matic Špec (New Zealand) Kiranpal Pannu (Germany) Tim Handel
November 29	Monastir, Tunisia; Hard; M15; Singles and Doubles Draws	(United Kingdom) Stuart Parker; 6–2, 6–4	(France) Ugo Blanchet	(Tunisia) Moez Echargui (Czech Republic) Andrew Paulson	(France) Mathieu Scaglia (United States) Michael Zhu (Lithuania) Matas Vasiliauskas (China) Mu Tao
November 29	Monastir, Tunisia; Hard; M15; Singles and Doubles Draws	(Serbia) Viktor Jović (Tunisia) Aziz Ouakaa; 6–4, 3–6, [10–7]	(France) Arthur Bouquier (United Kingdom) Stuart Parker	(Tunisia) Moez Echargui (Czech Republic) Andrew Paulson	(France) Mathieu Scaglia (United States) Michael Zhu (Lithuania) Matas Vasiliauskas (China) Mu Tao
November 29	Antalya, Turkey; Clay; M15; Singles and Doubles Draws'	(United Kingdom) Billy Harris; 6–2, 1–6, 6–4	(France) Arthur Fils	(Spain) Pol Toledo Bagué (Switzerland) Damien Wenger	(Switzerland) Nicolás Parizzia (Switzerland) Louroi Martinez (Hungary) Gergely Madarász (Romania) Bogdan Ionuț Apostol
November 29	Antalya, Turkey; Clay; M15; Singles and Doubles Draws'	(Kazakhstan) Grigoriy Lomakin (Ukraine) Oleg Prihodko; 7–5, 3–6, [10–5]	(Japan) Toshihide Matsui (Japan) Kaito Uesugi	(Spain) Pol Toledo Bagué (Switzerland) Damien Wenger	(Switzerland) Nicolás Parizzia (Switzerland) Louroi Martinez (Hungary) Gergely Madarász (Romania) Bogdan Ionuț Apostol

=== December ===
Week of	Tournament	Winner	Runners-up	Semifinalists	Quarterfinalists
December 6	Río Cuarto, Argentina; Clay; M25; Singles and Doubles Draws	(Argentina) Santiago Rodríguez Taverna; 6–2, 7–6^{(9–7)}	(Argentina) Juan Bautista Torres	(Argentina) Francisco Comesaña (Argentina) Tomás Farjat	(Argentina) Mariano Navone (Argentina) Alejo Lorenzo Lingua Lavallén (Argentina) Franco Emanuel Egea (Argentina) Juan Pablo Paz
December 6	Río Cuarto, Argentina; Clay; M25; Singles and Doubles Draws	(Argentina) Franco Emanuel Egea (Argentina) Gabriel Alejandro Hidalgo; 2–6, 6–3, [10–7]	(Argentina) Federico Agustín Gómez (Argentina) Alejo Vilaro	(Argentina) Francisco Comesaña (Argentina) Tomás Farjat	(Argentina) Mariano Navone (Argentina) Alejo Lorenzo Lingua Lavallén (Argentina) Franco Emanuel Egea (Argentina) Juan Pablo Paz
December 6	Santo Domingo, Dominican Republic; Hard; M15; Singles and Doubles Draws	(Dominican Republic) Peter Bertran; 6–3, 6–3	(Italy) Marco Brugnerotto	(France) Enzo Wallart (United States) Alfredo Perez	(United States) Jack Anthrop (Republic of Ireland) Osgar O'Hoisin (United States) Nathan Ponwith (France) Alexis Musialek
December 6	Santo Domingo, Dominican Republic; Hard; M15; Singles and Doubles Draws	(Denmark) Johannes Ingildsen (United States) Alfredo Perez; 6–3, 6–3	(Italy) Marco Brugnerotto (Republic of Ireland) Osgar O'Hoisin	(France) Enzo Wallart (United States) Alfredo Perez	(United States) Jack Anthrop (Republic of Ireland) Osgar O'Hoisin (United States) Nathan Ponwith (France) Alexis Musialek
December 6	Cairo, Egypt; Clay; M15; Singles and Doubles Draws	(Spain) José Francisco Vidal Azorín; 7–5, 6–0	(Spain) Bruno Pujol Navarro	(Germany) Niklas Schell (Spain) Mario Mansilla Díez	(Spain) Max Alcalá Gurri (Georgia (country)) Saba Purtseladze (Russia) Egor Novikov (Italy) Roberto Miceli
December 6	Cairo, Egypt; Clay; M15; Singles and Doubles Draws	(Peru) Pedro Iamachkine (Argentina) Fermín Tenti; 6–4, 6–2	(Chinese Taipei) Ray Ho (Chinese Taipei) Yin Bang-shuo	(Germany) Niklas Schell (Spain) Mario Mansilla Díez	(Spain) Max Alcalá Gurri (Georgia (country)) Saba Purtseladze (Russia) Egor Novikov (Italy) Roberto Miceli
December 6	Cancún, Mexico; Hard; M15; Singles and Doubles Draws	(Canada) Liam Draxl; 6–7^{(4–7)}, 7–6^{(7–5)}, 7–6^{(8–6)}	(United States) Christian Langmo	(United States) Ezekiel Clark (United States) Tristan McCormick	(Colombia) Juan Sebastián Gómez (Peru) Arklon Huertas del Pino (Mexico) Alex Hernández (United States) Alexander Bernard
December 6	Cancún, Mexico; Hard; M15; Singles and Doubles Draws	(Germany) Tim Handel (Switzerland) Yannik Steinegger; 7–6^{(7–5)}, 6–3	(Canada) Liam Draxl (Canada) Cleeve Harper	(United States) Ezekiel Clark (United States) Tristan McCormick	(Colombia) Juan Sebastián Gómez (Peru) Arklon Huertas del Pino (Mexico) Alex Hernández (United States) Alexander Bernard
December 6	Monastir, Tunisia; Hard; M15; Singles and Doubles Draws	(United States) Omni Kumar; 7–5, 6–4	(Spain) Adrià Soriano Barrera	(Italy) Luigi Sorrentino (Serbia) Viktor Jović	(United States) Gage Brymer (Czech Republic) Andrew Paulson (France) Arthur Bouquier (Russia) Kirill Kivattsev
December 6	Monastir, Tunisia; Hard; M15; Singles and Doubles Draws	(France) Arthur Bouquier (United Kingdom) Stuart Parker; 7–5, 4–6, [10–7]	(Italy) Omar Brigida (Italy) Alessandro Coccioli	(Italy) Luigi Sorrentino (Serbia) Viktor Jović	(United States) Gage Brymer (Czech Republic) Andrew Paulson (France) Arthur Bouquier (Russia) Kirill Kivattsev
December 6	Antalya, Turkey; Clay; M15; Singles and Doubles Draws	(United Kingdom) Billy Harris; 6–1, 6–4	(Ecuador) Antonio Cayetano March	(Lithuania) Tadas Babelis (Israel) Daniel Cukierman	(Russia) Denis Klok (Romania) Bogdan Ionuț Apostol (Switzerland) Louroi Martinez (France) Arthur Fils
December 6	Antalya, Turkey; Clay; M15; Singles and Doubles Draws	(Lithuania) Tadas Babelis (Israel) Daniel Cukierman; 6–3, 6–7^{(4–7)}, [10–4]	(Turkey) Berk İlkel (Turkey) S Mert Özdemir	(Lithuania) Tadas Babelis (Israel) Daniel Cukierman	(Russia) Denis Klok (Romania) Bogdan Ionuț Apostol (Switzerland) Louroi Martinez (France) Arthur Fils
December 13	Cancún, Mexico; Hard; M15; Singles and Doubles Draws	(Canada) Liam Draxl; 6–0, 6–1	(United States) Isaiah Strode	(United States) Tristan McCormick (Colombia) Juan Sebastián Gómez	(United States) Alexander Bernard (United States) Mwendwa Mbithi (United States) Evan Zhu (United States) Ezekiel Clark
December 13	Cancún, Mexico; Hard; M15; Singles and Doubles Draws	(Peru) Arklon Huertas del Pino (Peru) Conner Huertas del Pino; 6–4, 6–4	(France) Constantin Bittoun Kouzmine (Australia) Brandon Walkin	(United States) Tristan McCormick (Colombia) Juan Sebastián Gómez	(United States) Alexander Bernard (United States) Mwendwa Mbithi (United States) Evan Zhu (United States) Ezekiel Clark
December 13	Lambaré, Paraguay; Clay; W15; Singles and Doubles Draws	(Argentina) Gabriel Alejandro Hidalgo; 6–1, 6–3	(Argentina) Ignacio Monzón	(Argentina) Valerio Aboian (Uruguay) Ignacio Carou	(Brazil) João Victor Couto Loureiro (Paraguay) Juan Borba (Argentina) Juan Bautista Otegui (Brazil) Igor Gimenez
December 13	Lambaré, Paraguay; Clay; W15; Singles and Doubles Draws	(Argentina) Leonardo Aboian (Argentina) Valerio Aboian; 6–4, 1–6, [10–8]	(Chile) Nicolás Bruna (Chile) Miguel Fernando Pereira	(Argentina) Valerio Aboian (Uruguay) Ignacio Carou	(Brazil) João Victor Couto Loureiro (Paraguay) Juan Borba (Argentina) Juan Bautista Otegui (Brazil) Igor Gimenez
December 13	Doha, Qatar; Hard; M15; Singles and Doubles Draws	(Lebanon) Hady Habib; 6–2, 4–6, 6–3	(India) Sasikumar Mukund	(Chinese Taipei) Hsu Yu-hsiou (Czech Republic) Dominik Palán	(United States) Michael Zhu (Netherlands) Sidané Pontjodikromo (United Kingdom) Ryan James Storrie (Chinese Taipei) Ray Ho
December 13	Doha, Qatar; Hard; M15; Singles and Doubles Draws	(France) Théo Arribagé (France) Luca Sanchez; 6–3, 3–4, ret.	(France) Maxence Brovillé (France) Axel Garcian	(Chinese Taipei) Hsu Yu-hsiou (Czech Republic) Dominik Palán	(United States) Michael Zhu (Netherlands) Sidané Pontjodikromo (United Kingdom) Ryan James Storrie (Chinese Taipei) Ray Ho
December 13	Monastir, Tunisia; Hard; M15; Singles and Doubles Draws	(France) Martin Breysach; 6–4, 4–6, 7–6^{(7–5)}	(United States) Omni Kumar	(Tunisia) Moez Echargui (Italy) Samuel Vincent Ruggeri	(Tunisia) Wissam Abderrahman (Ivory Coast) Eliakim Coulibaly (Italy) Luigi Sorrentino (Serbia) Viktor Jović
December 13	Monastir, Tunisia; Hard; M15; Singles and Doubles Draws	(France) Arthur Bouquier (France) Martin Breysach; 6–3, 7–5	(United Kingdom) Julian Cash (Belgium) Loïc Cloes	(Tunisia) Moez Echargui (Italy) Samuel Vincent Ruggeri	(Tunisia) Wissam Abderrahman (Ivory Coast) Eliakim Coulibaly (Italy) Luigi Sorrentino (Serbia) Viktor Jović
December 13	Antalya, Turkey; Clay; M15; Singles and Doubles Draws	(Sweden) Dragoș Nicolae Mădăraș; 7–5, 6–1	(United Kingdom) Billy Harris	(Turkey) Koray Kırcı (France) Luca Van Assche	(France) Arthur Fils (Turkey) Marsel İlhan (Russia) Denis Klok (Romania) Bogdan Ionuț Apostol
December 13	Antalya, Turkey; Clay; M15; Singles and Doubles Draws	(Romania) Patrick Grigoriu (Sweden) Dragoș Nicolae Mădăraș; 6–3, 1–6, [10–2]	(Russia) Mikhail Fufygin (Russia) Timur Kiyamov	(Turkey) Koray Kırcı (France) Luca Van Assche	(France) Arthur Fils (Turkey) Marsel İlhan (Russia) Denis Klok (Romania) Bogdan Ionuț Apostol
December 20	Doha, Qatar; Hard; M15; Singles and Doubles Draws	(Czech Republic) Dominik Palán; 7–6^{(7–1)}, 6–3	(Netherlands) Sidané Pontjodikromo	(Czech Republic) Martin Krumich (Sweden) Dragoș Nicolae Mădăraș	(Cyprus) Menelaos Efstathiou (Syria) Kareem Al Allaf (India) Sasikumar Mukund (Chinese Taipei) Ray Ho
December 20	Doha, Qatar; Hard; M15; Singles and Doubles Draws	(Ukraine) Marat Deviatiarov (Chinese Taipei) Hsu Yu-hsiou; 6–1, 6–0	(Chinese Taipei) Huang Tsung-hao (Georgia (country)) Saba Purtseladze	(Czech Republic) Martin Krumich (Sweden) Dragoș Nicolae Mădăraș	(Cyprus) Menelaos Efstathiou (Syria) Kareem Al Allaf (India) Sasikumar Mukund (Chinese Taipei) Ray Ho
December 20	Monastir, Tunisia; Hard; M15; Singles and Doubles Draws	(Japan) Renta Tokuda; 5–7, 6–4, 6–3	(Tunisia) Skander Mansouri	(United States) Omni Kumar (Tunisia) Moez Echargui	(Ivory Coast) Eliakim Coulibaly (Italy) Marco Miceli (Italy) Samuel Vincent Ruggeri (Japan) Kazuma Kawachi
December 20	Monastir, Tunisia; Hard; M15; Singles and Doubles Draws	(Italy) Samuel Vincent Ruggeri (China) Bu Yunchaokete; 6–3, 3–6, [10–6]	(Japan) Kazuma Kawachi (Japan) Renta Tokuda	(United States) Omni Kumar (Tunisia) Moez Echargui	(Ivory Coast) Eliakim Coulibaly (Italy) Marco Miceli (Italy) Samuel Vincent Ruggeri (Japan) Kazuma Kawachi
December 27	Doha, Qatar; Hard; M15; Singles and Doubles Draws	(Sweden) Dragoș Nicolae Mădăraș; 6–3, 6–2	(Czech Republic) Martin Krumich	(Kazakhstan) Beibit Zhukayev (Czech Republic) Dominik Palán	(Syria) Hazem Naw (India) Adil Kalyanpur (Italy) Lorenzo Rottoli (Belgium) Tibo Colson
December 27	Doha, Qatar; Hard; M15; Singles and Doubles Draws	(France) Théo Arribagé (France) Luca Sanchez; 7–5, 6–4	(Chinese Taipei) Ray Ho (Kazakhstan) Beibit Zhukayev	(Kazakhstan) Beibit Zhukayev (Czech Republic) Dominik Palán	(Syria) Hazem Naw (India) Adil Kalyanpur (Italy) Lorenzo Rottoli (Belgium) Tibo Colson
December 27	Monastir, Tunisia; Hard; M15; Singles and Doubles Draws	(Tunisia) Skander Mansouri; 6–1, 7–6^{(8–6)}	(Japan) Renta Tokuda	(Italy) Riccardo Balzerani (United States) Omni Kumar	(Germany) Robert Strombachs (Russia) Vladislav Ivanov (France) Robin Bertrand (Japan) Kazuki Nishiwaki
December 27	Monastir, Tunisia; Hard; M15; Singles and Doubles Draws	(Tunisia) Wissam Abderrahman (China) Bu Yunchaokete; 5–7, 6–4, [11–9]	(Japan) Kazuma Kawachi (Japan) Renta Tokuda	(Italy) Riccardo Balzerani (United States) Omni Kumar	(Germany) Robert Strombachs (Russia) Vladislav Ivanov (France) Robin Bertrand (Japan) Kazuki Nishiwaki
