= 2026 Challenger Banque Nationale de Québec – Singles =

Singles
- 2026 Challenger Banque Nationale de Québec

Final
- Champion: (France) Luca Van Assche
- Runner-up: (Greece) Stefanos Sakellaridis
- Score: 6–1, 6–4

Events
Singles	Doubles
- Challenger Banque Nationale de Québec

This was the first edition of the tournament.

Luca Van Assche won the title after defeating Stefanos Sakellaridis 6–1, 6–4 in the final.

== Seeds ==
The top four seeds received a bye into the second round.

1. (Belgium) Zizou Bergs (quarterfinals)
2. (France) Luca Van Assche (champion)
3. (United Kingdom) Jan Choinski (second round)
4. (France) Hugo Gaston (semifinals)
5. (Australia) Aleksandar Vukic (second round)
6. (France) Benjamin Bonzi (quarterfinals)
7. (Croatia) Dino Prižmić (first round)
8. (Netherlands) Jesper de Jong (quarterfinals)

== Draw ==
Key

- Q = Qualifier
- WC = Wild card
- LL = Lucky loser
- Alt = Alternate
- ITF = ITF entry
- PR = Protected ranking
- SR = Special ranking
- SE = Special exempt
- JE = Junior exempt
- JR = Junior Accelerator Programme entrant
- CO = College Accelerator Programme entrant
- NG = Next Gen Accelerator Program entrant
- w/o = Walkover
- r = Retired
- d = Defaulted

=== Finals ===
Semifinals
Q	(Greece) Stefanos Sakellaridis	6	7^{10}
Q	(Japan) Taro Daniel	4	6^{8}
4	(France) Hugo Gaston	4	4
2	(France) Luca Van Assche	6	6

Final
Q	(Greece) Stefanos Sakellaridis	1	4
2	(France) Luca Van Assche	6	6

=== Top half ===
First round
Alt	(Italy) A Pellegrino	3	6	6
Alt	(United States) N Basavareddy	6	3	4
Q	(Greece) S Sakellaridis	6	3	6
Q	(France) U Blanchet	4	6	2
Alt	(France) K Jacquet	6^{5}	1
5	(Australia) A Vukic	7^{7}	6
WC	(Canada) D Chan	3	2
Q	(Japan) T Daniel	6	6
Alt	(United Kingdom) J Fearnley	6	7
Alt	(United States) M McDonald	4	5
WC	(Canada) A Galarneau	6	6
7	(Croatia) D Prižmić	4	4

Second round
1	(Belgium) Z Bergs	6	6
Alt	(Italy) A Pellegrino	3	2
Q	(Greece) S Sakellaridis	6	6
5	(Australia) A Vukic	4	4
3	(United Kingdom) J Choinski	4	3
Q	(Japan) T Daniel	6	6
Alt	(United Kingdom) J Fearnley	6	6
WC	(Canada) A Galarneau	2	3

Quarterfinals
1	(Belgium) Z Bergs	6^{3}	6	4
Q	(Greece) S Sakellaridis	7^{7}	4	6
Q	(Japan) T Daniel	6	6
Alt	(United Kingdom) J Fearnley	4	1

Semifinals
Q	(Greece) S Sakellaridis	6	7^{10}
Q	(Japan) T Daniel	4	6^{8}

=== Bottom half ===
First round
8	(Netherlands) J de Jong	7	6
Alt	(Australia) D Sweeny	5	0
Alt	(Norway) N Budkov Kjær	6	6
Alt	(China) Y Bu	3	1
Alt	(Italy) F Maestrelli	4	6^{4}
(Australia) A Popyrin	6	7^{7}
6	(France) B Bonzi	7^{7}	6
WC	(Canada) J Boulais	6^{4}	3
Q	(South Korea) S-w Kwon	7	4	6
Alt	(Japan) S Mochizuki	5	6	3
Alt	(Austria) J Rodionov	1	4
NG	(Japan) R Sakamoto	6	6

Second round
8	(Netherlands) J de Jong	6	6
Alt	(Norway) N Budkov Kjær	3	1
(Australia) A Popyrin	2^{r}
4	(France) H Gaston	5
6	(France) B Bonzi	w/o
Q	(South Korea) S-w Kwon
NG	(Japan) R Sakamoto	6	4	6^{3}
2	(France) L Van Assche	4	6	7^{7}

Quarterfinals
8	(Netherlands) J de Jong	6^{2}	1
4	(France) H Gaston	7^{7}	6
6	(France) B Bonzi	6^{2}	5
2	(France) L Van Assche	7^{7}	7

Semifinals
4	(France) H Gaston	4	4
2	(France) L Van Assche	6	6
