= 2026 BOSS Open – Singles =

Singles
- 2026 BOSS Open

Final
- Champion: (United States) Ben Shelton
- Runner-up: (United States) Taylor Fritz
- Score: 6–4, 2–6, 6–4

Details
- Draw: 28 (4 Q / 3 WC )
- Seeds: 8

Events
Singles	Doubles
- Stuttgart Open

Ben Shelton defeated defending champion Taylor Fritz in the final, 6–4, 2–6, 6–4 to win the singles tennis title at the 2026 Stuttgart Open. It was his sixth career ATP Tour title and first on grass courts. Shelton saved three match points en route to the title: one in the second round against Marcos Giron and two in the semifinals against Jiří Lehečka.

== Seeds ==
The top four seeds received a bye into the second round.

1. (United States) Ben Shelton (champion)
2. (United States) Taylor Fritz (final)
3. (Kazakhstan) Alexander Bublik (semifinals)
4. (Czech Republic) Jiří Lehečka (semifinals)
5. (United States) Tommy Paul (withdrew)
6. (United States) Frances Tiafoe (quarterfinals)
7. (Spain) Alejandro Davidovich Fokina (first round)
8. (France) Corentin Moutet (first round)

== Draw ==
Key

- Q = Qualifier
- WC = Wild card
- LL = Lucky loser
- Alt = Alternate
- ITF = ITF entry
- PR = Protected ranking
- SR = Special ranking
- SE = Special exempt
- JE = Junior exempt
- JR = Junior Accelerator Programme entrant
- CO = College Accelerator Programme entrant
- NG = Next Gen Accelerator Program entrant
- w/o = Walkover
- r = Retired
- d = Defaulted

=== Finals ===
Semifinals
1	(United States) Ben Shelton	6^{4}	7^{16}	7^{8}
4	(Czech Republic) Jiří Lehečka	7^{7}	6^{14}	6^{6}
3	(Kazakhstan) Alexander Bublik	4	4
2	(United States) Taylor Fritz	6	6

Final
1	(United States) Ben Shelton	6	2	6
2	(United States) Taylor Fritz	4	6	4

=== Top half ===
First round
(Spain) R Bautista Agut	6^{3}	5
(United States) M Giron	7^{7}	7
(France) Q Halys	4	2
Q	(Japan) S Shimabukuro	6	6
WC	(Australia) N Kyrgios	6	6
8	(France) C Moutet	3	4
WC	(Germany) D Dedura	4	3
(Australia) J Duckworth	6	6
WC	(Germany) T Gentzsch	7^{9}	6^{2}	3
(Australia) R Hijikata	6^{7}	7^{7}	6
(Germany) D Altmaier	6^{3}	6	4
6	(United States) F Tiafoe	7^{7}	4	6

Second round
1	(United States) B Shelton	6^{4}	6	7^{7}
(United States) M Giron	7^{7}	4	6^{5}
Q	(Japan) S Shimabukuro	4	7^{7}	6
WC	(Australia) N Kyrgios	6	6^{5}	4
4	(Czech Republic) J Lehečka	6^{8}	6	7^{7}
(Australia) J Duckworth	7^{10}	4	6^{3}
(Australia) R Hijikata	4	4
6	(United States) F Tiafoe	6	6

Quarterfinals
1	(United States) B Shelton	4	6	6
Q	(Japan) S Shimabukuro	6	3	4
4	(Czech Republic) J Lehečka	6	7^{7}
6	(United States) F Tiafoe	4	6^{4}

Semifinals
1	(United States) B Shelton	6^{4}	7^{16}	7^{8}
4	(Czech Republic) J Lehečka	7^{7}	6^{14}	6^{6}

=== Bottom half ===
First round
LL	R Safiullin	5	7^{7}	6^{4}
(France) G Mpetshi Perricard	7	6^{4}	7^{7}
Q	(Belgium) G Onclin	7^{8}	6
(Hungary) F Marozsán	6^{6}	3
(Germany) J-L Struff	6	6^{5}	6
Q	(Canada) A Galarneau	2	7^{7}	3
7	(Spain) A Davidovich Fokina	2	7^{7}	1
(Italy) M Bellucci	6	6^{5}	6
(Germany) Y Hanfmann	7^{7}	7^{7}
(United States) A Kovacevic	6^{5}	6^{4}
Q	(France) P-H Herbert	7	3	4
(Spain) M Landaluce	5	6	6

Second round
(France) G Mpetshi Perricard	7^{7}	6
Q	(Belgium) G Onclin	6^{1}	2
(Germany) J-L Struff	6^{3}	6	2
3	(Kazakhstan) A Bublik	7^{7}	3	6
(Italy) M Bellucci	7	6^{4}	6
(Germany) Y Hanfmann	5	7^{7}	2
(Spain) M Landaluce	7^{7}	5	6^{3}
2	(United States) T Fritz	6^{4}	7	7^{7}

Quarterfinals
(France) G Mpetshi Perricard	6^{5}	6^{3}
3	(Kazakhstan) A Bublik	7^{7}	7^{7}
(Italy) M Bellucci	7	5	5
2	(United States) T Fritz	5	7	7

Semifinals
3	(Kazakhstan) A Bublik	4	4
2	(United States) T Fritz	6	6

== Qualifying ==
=== Seeds ===
1. (Italy) Lorenzo Sonego (withdrew)
2. (Japan) Sho Shimabukuro (qualified)
3. (Georgia (country)) Nikoloz Basilashvili (first round)
4. Roman Safiullin (qualifying competition, lucky loser)
5. (Austria) Jurij Rodionov (qualifying competition)
6. (Estonia) Daniil Glinka (first round)
7. (Belgium) Gauthier Onclin (qualified)
8. (Canada) Alexis Galarneau (qualified)

=== Qualifiers ===
1. (France) Pierre-Hugues Herbert
2. (Japan) Sho Shimabukuro
3. (Belgium) Gauthier Onclin
4. (Canada) Alexis Galarneau

=== Lucky loser ===
1. Roman Safiullin

=== Qualifying draw ===
==== First qualifier ====
First round
Alt	(Greece) Michalis Sakellaridis	1	1
(Turkey) Mert Alkaya	6	6
(France) Pierre-Hugues Herbert	7^{7}	6
6	(Estonia) Daniil Glinka	6^{3}	4

Qualifying competition
(Turkey) Mert Alkaya	6^{7}	4
(France) Pierre-Hugues Herbert	7^{9}	6

==== Second qualifier ====
First round
2	(Japan) Sho Shimabukuro	7	6
(Greece) Stefanos Sakellaridis	5	4
(Switzerland) Luca Castelnuovo	1	4
5	(Austria) Jurij Rodionov	6	6

Qualifying competition
2	(Japan) Sho Shimabukuro	7^{7}	6
5	(Austria) Jurij Rodionov	6^{4}	3

==== Third qualifier ====
First round
3	(Georgia (country)) Nikoloz Basilashvili	1	5
(Switzerland) Marc-Andrea Hüsler	6	7
Alt	(Brazil) Orlando Luz	1	3
7	(Belgium) Gauthier Onclin	6	6

Qualifying competition
(Switzerland) Marc-Andrea Hüsler	6^{1}	4
7	(Belgium) Gauthier Onclin	7^{7}	6

==== Fourth qualifier ====
First round
4	Roman Safiullin	6^{8}	7^{7}	6
Petr Bar Biryukov	7^{10}	6^{1}	3
(Chinese Taipei) Hsu Yu-hsiou	6	4	4
8	(Canada) Alexis Galarneau	4	6	6

Qualifying competition
4	Roman Safiullin	4	7^{7}	6^{5}
8	(Canada) Alexis Galarneau	6	6^{1}	7^{7}
