= 2026 BOSS Open =

- Date: 8–14 June
- Edition: 48th
- Category: ATP 250
- Draw: 28S / 16D
- Surface: Grass
- Location: Stuttgart, Germany
- Venue: Tennis Club Weissenhof

Champions

Singles
- (United States) Ben Shelton

Doubles
- (Germany) Yannick Hanfmann / (Germany) Jan-Lennard Struff
- Stuttgart Open

The 2026 BOSS Open was a men's tennis tournament played on outdoor grass courts. It was the 48th edition of the Stuttgart Open and an ATP 250 tournament of the 2026 ATP Tour. It was held at the Tennis Club Weissenhof in Stuttgart, Germany, from 8 June until 14 June 2026.

== Champions ==
=== Singles ===
- (United States) Ben Shelton def. (United States) Taylor Fritz, 6–4, 2–6, 6–4

=== Doubles ===
- (Germany) Yannick Hanfmann / (Germany) Jan-Lennard Struff def. (Estonia) Daniil Glinka / (Greece) Stefanos Sakellaridis, 7–6^{(7–2)}, 3–6, [11–9]

== Singles main draw entrants ==
=== Seeds ===
Country	Player	Rank	Seed
USA	Ben Shelton	5	1
USA	Taylor Fritz	9	2
KAZ	Alexander Bublik	10	3
CZE	Jiří Lehečka	12	4
~~USA~~	~~Tommy Paul~~	~~21~~	~~5~~
USA	Frances Tiafoe	22	6
ESP	Alejandro Davidovich Fokina	23	7
FRA	Corentin Moutet	34	8

- Rankings are as of 25 May 2026.

=== Other entrants ===
The following players received wildcards into the main draw:

- (Germany) Diego Dedura
- (Germany) Tom Gentzsch
- (Australia) Nick Kyrgios

The following players received entry from the qualifying draw:

- (Canada) Alexis Galarneau
- (France) Pierre-Hugues Herbert
- (Belgium) Gauthier Onclin
- (Japan) Sho Shimabukuro

The following player received entry as a lucky loser:

- Roman Safiullin

=== Withdrawals ===
- (Italy) Flavio Cobolli → replaced by (France) Giovanni Mpetshi Perricard
- (Germany) Justin Engel → replaced by (France) Quentin Halys
- (Argentina) Tomás Martín Etcheverry → replaced by (Germany) Jan-Lennard Struff
- (Czech Republic) Tomáš Macháč → replaced by (Australia) James Duckworth
- (Czech Republic) Jakub Menšík → replaced by (United States) Aleksandar Kovacevic
- (United States) Alex Michelsen → replaced by (Australia) Rinky Hijikata
- (United States) Brandon Nakashima → replaced by (Spain) Martín Landaluce
- (United States) Tommy Paul → replaced by Roman Safiullin
- (United States) Learner Tien → replaced by (Germany) Daniel Altmaier
- (Monaco) Valentin Vacherot → replaced by (Germany) Yannick Hanfmann
- (Germany) Alexander Zverev → replaced by (Hungary) Fábián Marozsán

== Doubles main draw entrants ==
=== Seeds ===
Country	Player	Country	Player	Rank	Seed
POR	Francisco Cabral	CRO	Nikola Mektić	39	1
BRA	Orlando Luz	BRA	Rafael Matos	63	2
GER	Jakob Schnaitter	GER	Mark Wallner	70	3
FRA	Sadio Doumbia	MEX	Santiago González	74	4

- Rankings are as of 25 May 2026.

=== Other entrants ===
The following pairs received wildcards into the doubles main draw:

- (Germany) Daniel Altmaier / (Germany) Hendrik Jebens
- (Kazakhstan) Alexander Bublik / (Australia) Nick Kyrgios

The following pair received entry as alternates:

- (Estonia) Daniil Glinka / (Greece) Stefanos Sakellaridis

=== Withdrawals ===
- (United States) Tommy Paul / (United States) Ben Shelton → replaced by (Estonia) Daniil Glinka / (Greece) Stefanos Sakellaridis
