= 2026 Challenger Banque Nationale de Québec – Doubles =

Doubles
- 2026 Challenger Banque Nationale de Québec

Final
- Champions: (Bulgaria) Alexander Donski (New Zealand) Ajeet Rai
- Runners-up: (Canada) Justin Boulais (Canada) Duncan Chan
- Score: 6–3, 4–6, [10–3]

Events
| Singles | Doubles |
- Challenger Banque Nationale de Québec

This was the first edition of the tournament.

Alexander Donski and Ajeet Rai won the title after defeating Justin Boulais and Duncan Chan 6–3, 4–6, [10–3] in the final.

== Seeds ==
1. (Czech Republic) Petr Nouza / (Austria) Neil Oberleitner (first round)
2. (Netherlands) Sander Arends / (Netherlands) David Pel (first round)
3. (Belgium) Sander Gillé / (Netherlands) Sem Verbeek (first round)
4. (New Zealand) Finn Reynolds / (New Zealand) James Watt (first round)

== Draw ==
Key

- Q = Qualifier
- WC = Wild card
- LL = Lucky loser
- Alt = Alternate
- ITF = ITF entry
- PR = Protected ranking
- SR = Special ranking
- SE = Special exempt
- JE = Junior exempt
- JR = Junior Accelerator Programme entrant
- CO = College Accelerator Programme entrant
- NG = Next Gen Accelerator Program entrant
- w/o = Walkover
- r = Retired
- d = Defaulted

First round
1 | (Czech Republic) P Nouza (Austria) N Oberleitner | 6^{5} | 6 | [8]
(Uruguay) A Behar (Brazil) F Romboli | 7^{7} | 3 | [10]
(Italy) F Maestrelli (Italy) A Pellegrino | 4^{r}
(United States) K Poling (Australia) C Puttergill | 3
3 | (Belgium) S Gillé (Netherlands) S Verbeek | 5 | 6^{4}
WC | (Canada) J Boulais (Canada) D Chan | 7 | 7^{7}
(France) U Blanchet (France) K Jacquet | 4 | 7^{10} | [10]
(Chinese Taipei) J Jung (Antigua and Barbuda) J Maginley | 6 | 6^{8} | [5]
(United Kingdom) J Choinski (Netherlands) J de Jong | 6 | 1 | [4]
Alt | (Bulgaria) A Donski (New Zealand) A Rai | 4 | 6 | [10]
WC | (Canada) N Arseneault (Canada) Alexander Rozin | 2 | 6 | [10]
4 | (New Zealand) F Reynolds (New Zealand) J Watt | 6 | 3 | [6]
(Ecuador) G Escobar (India) N Kaliyanda Poonacha | 7 | 6
(United States) B Kittay (United States) R Stalder | 5 | 1
(United States) N Lammons (United States) J Withrow | 6 | 7^{7}
2 | (Netherlands) S Arends (Netherlands) D Pel | 3 | 6^{5}

Quarterfinals
(Uruguay) A Behar (Brazil) F Romboli | 6 | 6
(United States) K Poling (Australia) C Puttergill | 1 | 2
WC | (Canada) J Boulais (Canada) D Chan | 7^{13} | 6
(France) U Blanchet (France) K Jacquet | 6^{11} | 1
Alt | (Bulgaria) A Donski (New Zealand) A Rai | 7^{7} | 7^{7}
WC | (Canada) N Arseneault (Canada) A Rozin | 6^{3} | 6^{5}
(Ecuador) G Escobar (India) N Kaliyanda Poonacha | 3 | 4
(United States) N Lammons (United States) J Withrow | 6 | 6

Semifinals
(Uruguay) A Behar (Brazil) F Romboli | 6 | 1 | [6]
WC | (Canada) J Boulais (Canada) D Chan | 1 | 6 | [10]
Alt | (Bulgaria) A Donski (New Zealand) A Rai | 6 | 6
(United States) N Lammons (United States) J Withrow | 1 | 0

Final
WC | (Canada) J Boulais (Canada) D Chan | 3 | 6 | [3]
Alt | (Bulgaria) A Donski (New Zealand) A Rai | 6 | 4 | [10]
