= 2025 Challenger Banque Nationale de Drummondville – Singles =

Singles
- 2025 Challenger Banque Nationale de Drummondville

Final
- Champion: (Estonia) Daniil Glinka
- Runner-up: (Canada) Duncan Chan
- Score: 6–4, 6–2

Events
Singles	Doubles
- Challenger Banque Nationale de Drummondville

Aidan Mayo was the defending champion but chose not to defend his title.

Daniil Glinka won the title after defeating Duncan Chan 6–4, 6–2 in the final.

== Seeds ==
1. (Canada) Liam Draxl (quarterfinals)
2. (France) Clément Chidekh (first round)
3. (Germany) Patrick Zahraj (first round)
4. (Estonia) Daniil Glinka (champion)
5. (Japan) James Trotter (second round)
6. (United States) Alex Rybakov (first round)
7. (United States) Michael Mmoh (second round, retired)
8. (Romania) Gabi Adrian Boitan (quarterfinals)

== Draw ==
Key

- Q = Qualifier
- WC = Wild card
- LL = Lucky loser
- Alt = Alternate
- ITF = ITF entry
- PR = Protected ranking
- SR = Special ranking
- SE = Special exempt
- JE = Junior exempt
- JR = Junior Accelerator Programme entrant
- CO = College Accelerator Programme entrant
- NG = Next Gen Accelerator Program entrant
- w/o = Walkover
- r = Retired
- d = Defaulted

=== Finals ===
Semifinals
(Poland) Maks Kaśnikowski	1	6^{4}
4	(Estonia) Daniil Glinka	6	7^{7}
(United Kingdom) Charles Broom	7^{7}	3	3
WC	(Canada) Duncan Chan	6^{3}	6	6

Final
4	(Estonia) Daniil Glinka	6	6
WC	(Canada) Duncan Chan	4	2

=== Top half ===
First round
1	(Canada) L Draxl	3	7^{7}	6
Q	(Canada) Mikael Arseneault	6	6^{5}	0
(Canada) J Boulais	4	0
(United States) Tristan McCormick	6	6
(Poland) M Kaśnikowski	3	6	6
(Germany) M Wiskandt	6	4	1
WC	(Canada) C Harper	3	3
7	(United States) M Mmoh	6	6
4	(Estonia) D Glinka	6	6
(United States) C Kingsley	4	2
Q	(South Korea) Kim Jang-jun	6	6
Q	(Morocco) T Baadi	3	3
(Canada) D Martin	6	6
(Australia) E Winter	3	3
WC	(Canada) Keegan Rice	4	7^{7}	6
6	(United States) A Rybakov	6	6^{5}	3

Second round
1	(Canada) L Draxl	6^{3}	7^{9}	6
(United States) T McCormick	7^{7}	6^{7}	3
(Poland) M Kaśnikowski	1	6	4
7	(United States) M Mmoh	6	4	0^{r}
4	(Estonia) D Glinka	6^{5}	6	6
Q	(South Korea) J-j Kim	7^{7}	3	2
(Canada) D Martin	6^{2}	7	6
WC	(Canada) K Rice	7^{7}	5	3

Quarterfinals
1	(Canada) L Draxl	4	3
(Poland) M Kaśnikowski	6	6
4	(Estonia) D Glinka	6	3	6
(Canada) D Martin	4	6	4

Semifinals
(Poland) M Kaśnikowski	1	6^{4}
4	(Estonia) D Glinka	6	7^{7}

=== Bottom half ===
First round
5	(Japan) J Trotter	6	6
Q	(Czech Republic) D Poljak	2	3
(Canada) JC Aguilar	1	1
Q	(Germany) L Wessels	6	6
(Greece) A Thanos	3	4
(United States) D Milavsky	6	6
(United Kingdom) C Broom	6	6
3	(Germany) P Zahraj	3	2
8	(Romania) GA Boitan	6	6
(United States) S Banerjee	4	4
(United States) Andre Ilagan	3	6	6
(Canada) N Arseneault	6	3	0
Q	(United States) K Poling	3	4
WC	(Canada) D Chan	6	6
(France) A Ghibaudo	7	6
2	(France) C Chidekh	5	3

Second round
5	(Japan) J Trotter	4	6	6^{5}
Q	(Germany) L Wessels	6	3	7^{7}
(United States) D Milavsky	6	4	2
(United Kingdom) C Broom	2	6	6
8	(Romania) GA Boitan	6	7^{7}
(United States) A Ilagan	4	6^{5}
WC	(Canada) D Chan	6	6
(France) A Ghibaudo	4	4

Quarterfinals
Q	(Germany) L Wessels	3	6	1
(United Kingdom) C Broom	6	1	6
8	(Romania) GA Boitan	4	5
WC	(Canada) D Chan	6	7

Semifinals
(United Kingdom) C Broom	7^{7}	3	3
WC	(Canada) D Chan	6^{3}	6	6
