= 2026 BOSS Open – Doubles =

Doubles
- 2026 BOSS Open

Final
- Champions: (Germany) Yannick Hanfmann (Germany) Jan-Lennard Struff
- Runners-up: (Estonia) Daniil Glinka (Greece) Stefanos Sakellaridis
- Score: 7–6^{(7–2)}, 3–6, [11–9]

Details
- Draw: 16
- Seeds: 4

Events
Singles	Doubles
- Stuttgart Open

Yannick Hanfmann and Jan-Lennard Struff defeated Daniil Glinka and Stefanos Sakellaridis in the final, 7–6^{(7–2)}, 3–6, [11–9] to win the doubles tennis title at the 2026 Stuttgart Open. It was the first ATP Tour doubles title for Hanfmann and fifth for Struff.

Santiago González and Austin Krajicek were the reigning champions, but Krajicek did not participate this year. González partnered Sadio Doumbia, but lost in the first round to Hanfmann and Struff.

== Seeds ==
1. (Portugal) Francisco Cabral / (Croatia) Nikola Mektić (semifinals)
2. (Brazil) Orlando Luz / (Brazil) Rafael Matos (first round)
3. (Germany) Jakob Schnaitter / (Germany) Mark Wallner (first round)
4. (France) Sadio Doumbia / (Mexico) Santiago González (first round)

== Draw ==
Key

- Q = Qualifier
- WC = Wild card
- LL = Lucky loser
- Alt = Alternate
- ITF = ITF entry
- PR = Protected ranking
- SR = Special ranking
- SE = Special exempt
- JE = Junior exempt
- JR = Junior Accelerator Programme entrant
- CO = College Accelerator Programme entrant
- NG = Next Gen Accelerator Program entrant
- w/o = Walkover
- r = Retired
- d = Defaulted

=== Draw ===
First round
1	(Portugal) F Cabral (Croatia) N Mektić	7^{7}	4	[10]
(Ecuador) D Hidalgo (United States) P Trhac	6^{4}	6	[6]
(France) A Reymond (France) L Sanchez	6^{4}	4
WC	(Germany) D Altmaier (Germany) H Jebens	7^{7}	6
3	(Germany) J Schnaitter (Germany) M Wallner	7^{7}	4	[4]
Alt	(Estonia) D Glinka (Greece) S Sakellaridis	6^{5}	6	[10]
WC	(Kazakhstan) A Bublik (Australia) N Kyrgios	6	2	[10]
(Switzerland) J Paul (United States) R Seggerman	3	6	[6]
(Germany) C Frantzen (Netherlands) R Haase	3	3
(Czech Republic) J Lehečka (France) C Moutet	6	6
(Germany) Y Hanfmann (Germany) J-L Struff	6	7^{7}
4	(France) S Doumbia (Mexico) S González	4	6^{1}
(United States) V Kirkov (Austria) L Miedler	6^{5}	6	[14]
(Brazil) M Demoliner (Brazil) M Melo	7^{7}	3	[12]
(Brazil) F Romboli (Australia) J-P Smith	3	6	[11]
2	(Brazil) O Luz (Brazil) R Matos	6	2	[9]

Quarterfinals
1	(Portugal) F Cabral (Croatia) N Mektić	6	7^{7}
WC	(Germany) D Altmaier (Germany) H Jebens	3	6^{4}
Alt	(Estonia) D Glinka (Greece) S Sakellaridis	w/o
WC	(Kazakhstan) A Bublik (Australia) N Kyrgios
(Czech Republic) J Lehečka (France) C Moutet
(Germany) Y Hanfmann (Germany) J-L Struff	w/o
(United States) V Kirkov (Austria) L Miedler	7^{7}	6
(Brazil) F Romboli (Australia) J-P Smith	6^{1}	4

Semifinals
1	(Portugal) F Cabral (Croatia) N Mektić	6	4	[5]
Alt	(Estonia) D Glinka (Greece) S Sakellaridis	2	6	[10]
(Germany) Y Hanfmann (Germany) J-L Struff	6	3	[11]
(United States) V Kirkov (Austria) L Miedler	4	6	[9]

Final
Alt	(Estonia) D Glinka (Greece) S Sakellaridis	6^{2}	6	[9]
(Germany) Y Hanfmann (Germany) J-L Struff	7^{7}	3	[11]
