= 2025 Challenger Banque Nationale de Drummondville =

- Date: November 10 – 16
- Edition: 18th
- Category: ATP Challenger Tour
- Surface: Hard (indoor)
- Location: Drummondville, Canada

Champions

Singles
- (Estonia) Daniil Glinka

Doubles
- (United States) Trey Hilderbrand / (United States) Mac Kiger
- Challenger de Drummondville

The 2025 Challenger Banque Nationale de Drummondville was a professional tennis tournament played on indoor hard courts. It was the 18th edition of the tournament and part of the 2025 ATP Challenger Tour. It took place in Drummondville, Canada between November 10 and 16, 2025.

== Singles main-draw entrants ==
=== Seeds ===
| Country | Player | Rank^{1} | Seed |
|---|---|---|---|
| CAN | Liam Draxl | 118 | 1 |
| FRA | Clément Chidekh | 234 | 2 |
| GER | Patrick Zahraj | 241 | 3 |
| EST | Daniil Glinka | 256 | 4 |
| JPN | James Trotter | 260 | 5 |
| USA | Alex Rybakov | 268 | 6 |
| USA | Michael Mmoh | 291 | 7 |
| ROU | Gabi Adrian Boitan | 334 | 8 |

- ^{1} Rankings are as of November 3, 2025.

=== Other entrants ===
The following players received wildcards into the singles main draw:

- (Canada) Duncan Chan
- (Canada) Cleeve Harper
- (Canada) Keegan Rice

The following players received entry from the qualifying draw:

- (Canada) Mikael Arseneault
- (Morocco) Taha Baadi
- (South Korea) Kim Jang-jun
- (United States) Karl Poling
- (Czech Republic) David Poljak
- (Germany) Louis Wessels

== Champions ==
=== Singles ===
- (Estonia) Daniil Glinka def. (Canada) Duncan Chan 6–4, 6–2.

=== Doubles ===
- (United States) Trey Hilderbrand / (United States) Mac Kiger def. (Mexico) Alan Magadán / (United States) Karl Poling 6–3, 6–4.
