= 2025 Challenger Banque Nationale de Drummondville – Doubles =

Doubles
- 2025 Challenger Banque Nationale de Drummondville

Final
- Champions: (United States) Trey Hilderbrand (United States) Mac Kiger
- Runners-up: (Mexico) Alan Magadán (United States) Karl Poling
- Score: 6–3, 6–4

Events
Singles	Doubles
- Challenger Banque Nationale de Drummondville

Robert Cash and JJ Tracy were the defending champions but chose not to defend their title.

Trey Hilderbrand and Mac Kiger won the title after defeating Alan Magadán and Karl Poling 6–3, 6–4 in the final.

== Seeds ==
1. (United States) Trey Hilderbrand / (United States) Mac Kiger (champions)
2. (United Kingdom) Ben Jones / (Czech Republic) David Poljak (quarterfinals)
3. (Germany) Tim Rühl / (Germany) Patrick Zahraj (semifinals)
4. (Canada) Cleeve Harper / (United Kingdom) Connor Thomson (quarterfinals)

== Draw ==
Key

- Q = Qualifier
- WC = Wild card
- LL = Lucky loser
- Alt = Alternate
- ITF = ITF entry
- PR = Protected ranking
- SR = Special ranking
- SE = Special exempt
- JE = Junior exempt
- JR = Junior Accelerator Programme entrant
- CO = College Accelerator Programme entrant
- NG = Next Gen Accelerator Program entrant
- w/o = Walkover
- r = Retired
- d = Defaulted

First round
(United States) A Ayeni (Canada) Benjamin Thomas George	6	6^{3}	[10]
WC	(Canada) D Martin (Canada) Joshua Peck	4	7^{7}	[4]
3	(Germany) T Rühl (Germany) P Zahraj	6	3	[10]
(Canada) JC Aguilar (Canada) J Boulais	2	6	[6]
(Venezuela) Juan José Bianchi (United States) D Milavsky	6	3	[5]
(Germany) Niklas Schell (Germany) L Wessels	3	6	[10]
WC	(Canada) L Draxl (Canada) Nicaise Muamba	1	7^{7}	[15]
(United States) C Kingsley (Antigua and Barbuda) J Maginley	6	6^{5}	[17]
(France) Robin Catry (United States) Tristan McCormick	4	7^{7}	[9]
4	(Canada) C Harper (United Kingdom) C Thomson	6	6^{4}	[11]
(Costa Rica) J Flores (United States) B Suarez	7^{7}	5	[6]
(Mexico) A Magadán (United States) K Poling	6^{3}	7	[10]

Quarterfinals
1	(United States) T Hilderbrand (United States) M Kiger	6	6
(United States) A Ayeni (Canada) BT George	4	2
3	(Germany) T Rühl (Germany) P Zahraj	7^{7}	6
(Germany) N Schell (Germany) L Wessels	6^{2}	2
(United States) C Kingsley (Antigua and Barbuda) J Maginley	4	6	[11]
4	(Canada) C Harper (United Kingdom) C Thomson	6	2	[9]
(Mexico) A Magadán (United States) K Poling	6	6
2	(United Kingdom) B Jones (Czech Republic) D Poljak	3	2

Semifinals
1	(United States) T Hilderbrand (United States) M Kiger	7	6
3	(Germany) T Rühl (Germany) P Zahraj	5	3
(United States) C Kingsley (Antigua and Barbuda) J Maginley	5	4
(Mexico) A Magadán (United States) K Poling	7	6

Final
1	(United States) T Hilderbrand (United States) M Kiger	6	6
(Mexico) A Magadán (United States) K Poling	3	4
