= 2026 Challenger Banque Nationale de Québec =

- Date: 18–23 August
- Edition: 1st
- Surface: Hard
- Location: Quebec City, Canada

Champions

Singles
- (France) Luca Van Assche

Doubles
- (Bulgaria) Alexander Donski / (New Zealand) Ajeet Rai
- Challenger Banque Nationale de Québec

The 2026 Challenger Banque Nationale de Québec was a professional tennis tournament played on hardcourts. It was the first edition of the tournament which was part of the 2026 ATP Challenger Tour 125. It took place in Quebec City, Canada between 18 and 23 August 2026.

== Singles main draw entrants ==
=== Seeds ===
Country	Player	Rank^{1}	Seed
BEL	Zizou Bergs	33	1
FRA	Luca Van Assche	54	2
GBR	Jan Choinski	77	3
FRA	Hugo Gaston	97	4
AUS	Aleksandar Vukic	99	5
FRA	Benjamin Bonzi	100	6
CRO	Dino Prižmić	101	7
NED	Jesper de Jong	106	8

- ^{1} Rankings as of 10 August 2026.

=== Other entrants ===
The following players received wildcards into the singles main draw:

- (Canada) Justin Boulais
- (Canada) Duncan Chan
- (Canada) Alexis Galarneau

The following player received entry into the singles main draw through the Next Gen Accelerator programme:

- (Japan) Rei Sakamoto

The following players received entry into the singles main draw as alternates:

- (United States) Nishesh Basavareddy
- (China) Bu Yunchaokete
- (Norway) Nicolai Budkov Kjær
- (United Kingdom) Jacob Fearnley
- (France) Kyrian Jacquet
- (Italy) Francesco Maestrelli
- (United States) Mackenzie McDonald
- (Japan) Shintaro Mochizuki
- (Italy) Andrea Pellegrino
- (Austria) Jurij Rodionov
- (Australia) Dane Sweeny

The following players received entry from the qualifying draw:

- (France) Ugo Blanchet
- (Japan) Taro Daniel
- (South Korea) Kwon Soon-woo
- (Greece) Stefanos Sakellaridis

== Champions ==
=== Singles ===
- (France) Luca Van Assche def. (Greece) Stefanos Sakellaridis 6–1, 6–4.

=== Doubles ===
- (Bulgaria) Alexander Donski / (New Zealand) Ajeet Rai def. (Canada) Justin Boulais / (Canada) Duncan Chan 6–3, 4–6, [10–3].
