= Matic Špec =

Slovenian tennis player

- Country (sports): Slovenia
- Residence: Maribor, Slovenia
- Born: 26 February 1995 (age 30)
- Plays: Right-handed (two-handed backhand)
- College: University of Minnesota
- Prize money: $24,620

Singles
- Career record: 0–0 (at ATP Tour level, Grand Slam level, and in Davis Cup)
- Career titles: 0
- Highest ranking: No. 710 (13 December 2021)

Doubles
- Career record: 1–0 (at ATP Tour level, Grand Slam level, and in Davis Cup)
- Career titles: 1 ITF
- Highest ranking: No. 701 (5 August 2019)

Team competitions
- Davis Cup: 1–0
- Last updated on: 6 February 2023.

Matic Špec (born 26 February 1995) is an inactive Slovenian tennis player.

Špec has a career high ATP singles ranking of 710, achieved on 13 December 2021. He also has a career high doubles ranking of 701, achieved on 5 August 2019. He has won 1 ITF doubles title.

Špec represents Slovenia at the Davis Cup, where he has a W/L record of 1–0.

Špec played college tennis at University of Minnesota.
