= Challenger Banque Nationale de Québec =

- 2026 Challenger Banque Nationale de Québec

ATP Challenger Tour
- Location: Quebec City, Canada
- Category: ATP Challenger Tour 125
- Surface: Hard
- Prize money: $225,000

The Challenger Banque Nationale de Québec is a professional tennis tournament played on hardcourts. It is currently part of the ATP Challenger Tour 125. It was first held in Quebec City, Canada in 2026.

== Past finals ==
=== Singles ===
Year	Champion	Runner-up	Score
2026	(France) Luca Van Assche	(Greece) Stefanos Sakellaridis	6–1, 6–4

=== Doubles ===
Year	Champions	Runners-up	Score
2026	(Bulgaria) Alexander Donski (New Zealand) Ajeet Rai	(Canada) Justin Boulais (Canada) Duncan Chan	6–3, 4–6, [10–3]
