= Duncan Chan =

Canadian tennis player (born 2005)

- Country (sports): Canada
- Born: 29 July 2005 (age 21) Markham, Canada
- Height: 1.83 m (6 ft 0 in)
- Plays: Right-handed (two-handed backhand)
- College: TCU
- Prize money: US $96,875

Singles
- Career record: 0–1 (at ATP Tour level, Grand Slam level, and in Davis Cup)
- Highest ranking: No. 465 (9 November 2026)
- Current ranking: No. 465 (9 November 2026)

Doubles
- Career record: 2–3 (at ATP Tour level, Grand Slam level, and in Davis Cup)
- Career titles: 2 ITF
- Highest ranking: No. 232 (26 October 2026)
- Current ranking: No. 239 (9 November 2026)
- Last updated on: 9 November 2026.

Duncan Chan (born 29 July 2005) is a Canadian tennis player. Chan has a career high ATP singles ranking of No. 465 achieved on 9 November 2026 and a career high ATP doubles ranking of No. 232 achieved on 26 October 2026.

Chan has made it to an ATP Challenger singles final at the 2025 Challenger Banque Nationale de Drummondville, where he lost to Daniil Glinka.

Chan plays college tennis at TCU.

In February 2026, Chan was given a doubles wildcard at the Dallas Open, partnering with Cosme Rolland de Ravel. They lost in the first round. He made his ATP main draw singles debut at the 2026 National Bank Open after qualifying for the main draw.

== ATP Challenger Tour finals ==
=== Singles: 1 (1 runner-up) ===
| Legend ATP Challenger Tour (0–1) | Titles by surface Hard (0–1) Clay (0–0) Grass (0–0) |

| Result | W–L | Date | Tournament | Tier | Surface | Opponent | Score |
|---|---|---|---|---|---|---|---|
| Loss | 0–1 | Nov 2025 | Challenger Banque Nationale de Drummondville, Canada | Challenger | Hard | (Estonia) Daniil Glinka | 4–6, 2–6 |

=== Doubles: 1 (1 runner-up) ===
| Legend ATP Challenger (0–1) ITF Futures (0–0) | Finals by surface Hard (0–1) Clay (0–0) Grass (0–0) |

| Result | W–L | Date | Tournament | Tier | Surface | Partner | Opponents | Score |
|---|---|---|---|---|---|---|---|---|
| Loss | 0–1 | Aug 2026 | Quebec City, Canada | Challenger | Hard | (Canada) Justin Boulais | (Bulgaria) Alexander Donski (New Zealand) Ajeet Rai | 3–6, 6–4, [3–10] |
