= Daniil Glinka =

Estonian tennis player (born 2000)

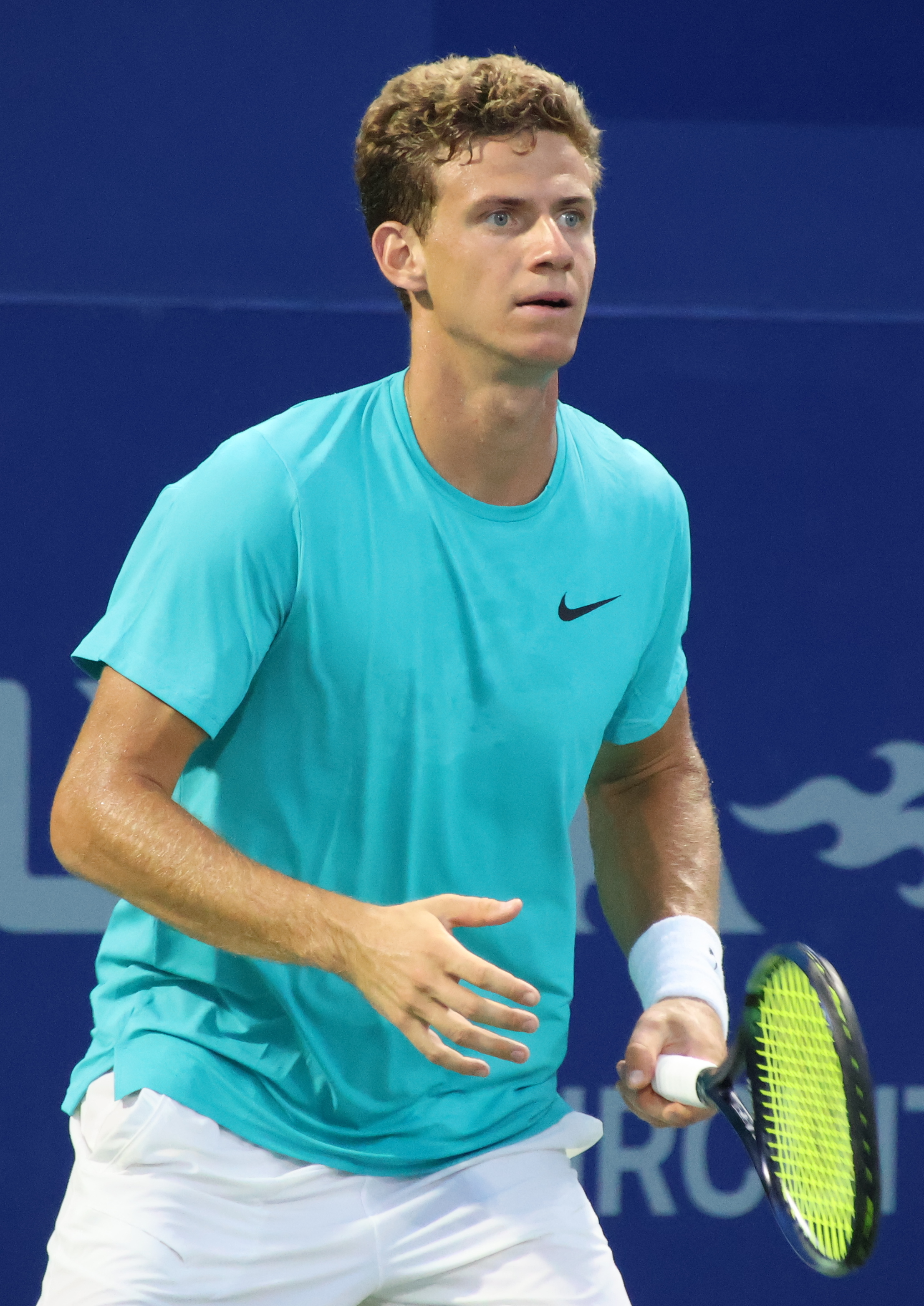
- Glinka in 2026
- Country (sports): Estonia
- Born: 12 May 2000 (age 26) Tallinn, Estonia
- Height: 1.88 m (6 ft 2 in)
- Plays: Left-handed (one-handed backhand)
- Prize money: US $382,526

Singles
- Career record: 1–2 (at ATP Tour level, Grand Slam level, and in Davis Cup)
- Career titles: 1 Challenger
- Highest ranking: No. 156 (24 August 2026)
- Current ranking: No. 156 (19 October 2026)

Grand Slam singles results
- Australian Open: Q2 (2026)
- French Open: Q2 (2026)
- Wimbledon: Q1 (2026)
- US Open: Q2 (2026)

Doubles
- Career record: 2–1 (at ATP Tour level, Grand Slam level, and in Davis Cup)
- Career titles: 0
- Highest ranking: No. 388 (19 October 2026)
- Current ranking: No. 388 (19 October 2026)

Team competitions
- Davis Cup: 4–2
- Last updated on: 19 October 2026.

Daniil Glinka (born 12 May 2000) is an Estonian tennis player. Glinka has a career high ATP singles ranking of world No. 156 achieved on 24 August 2026 and a career high ATP doubles ranking of No. 388 achieved on 19 October 2026.

Glinka represents Estonia at the Davis Cup, where he has a W/L record of 4–2.

== Career ==
=== 2025: Maiden ATP Challenger title ===
In September, Glinka reached his first ATP Challenger final at the Cassis Open, losing to Billy Harris in three sets.

In November, Glinka won his maiden ATP Challenger title in Drummondville, defeating wildcard entrant Duncan Chan in the final. Glinka became the third Estonian player (after Mark Lajal and Jurgen Zopp) to win a Challenger title.

== ATP Tour finals ==
=== Doubles: 1 (runner-up) ===
Legend Grand Slam (–) ATP 1000 (–) ATP 500 (–) ATP 250 (0–1)	Finals by surface Hard (–) Clay (–) Grass (0–1)	Finals by setting Outdoor (0–1) Indoor (–)

Result	W–L	Date	Tournament	Tier	Surface	Partner	Opponents	Score
Loss	0–1	Jun 2026	Stuttgart Open, Germany	ATP 250	Grass	(Greece) Stefanos Sakellaridis	(Germany) Yannick Hanfmann (Germany) Jan-Lennard Struff	6–7^{(2–7)}, 6–3, [9–11]

== ATP Challenger Tour finals ==
=== Singles: 4 (1 title, 3 runner-up) ===
Legend ATP Challenger Tour (1–3)	Finals by surface Hard (1–3) Clay (–)

Result	W–L	Date	Tournament	Tier	Surface	Opponent	Score
Loss	0–1	Sep 2025	Cassis Open, France	Challenger	Hard	(United Kingdom) Billy Harris	6–3, 5–7, 3–6
Win	1–1	Nov 2025	Challenger de Drummondville, Canada	Challenger	Hard	(Canada) Duncan Chan	6–4, 6–2
Loss	1–2	Jan 2026	Oeiras Indoors II, Portugal	Challenger	Hard (i)	(Luxembourg) Chris Rodesch	3–6, 5–7
Loss	1–3	Oct 2026	Ferrero Challenger, Spain	Challenger	Hard	(Serbia) Laslo Djere	4–6, 4–6
