= 2023 Challenger Banque Nationale de Drummondville – Singles =

Singles
- 2023 Challenger Banque Nationale de Drummondville

Final
- Champion: (Belgium) Zizou Bergs
- Runner-up: (Australia) James Duckworth
- Score: 6–4, 7–5

Events
Singles	Doubles
← 2022 ·	Challenger Banque Nationale de Drummondville	· 2024 →

Vasek Pospisil was the defending champion but chose not to defend his title.

Zizou Bergs won the title after defeating James Duckworth 6–4, 7–5 in the final.

== Seeds ==
1. (Germany) Dominik Koepfer (quarterfinals)
2. (Australia) James Duckworth (final)
3. (France) Benoît Paire (second round)
4. (Canada) Gabriel Diallo (withdrew)
5. (United Kingdom) Ryan Peniston (quarterfinals)
6. (Belgium) Zizou Bergs (champion)
7. (Canada) Alexis Galarneau (second round)
8. (Tunisia) Aziz Dougaz (quarterfinals)

== Draw ==
=== Key ===
- Q = Qualifier
- WC = Wild card
- LL = Lucky loser
- Alt = Alternate
- ITF = ITF entry
- PR = Protected ranking
- SR = Special ranking
- SE = Special exempt
- JE = Junior exempt
- JR = Junior Accelerator Programme entrant
- CO = College Accelerator Programme entrant
- NG = Next Gen Accelerator Program entrant
- w/o = Walkover
- r = Retired
- d = Defaulted

=== Finals ===
Semifinals
6	(Belgium) Zizou Bergs	w/o
(Czech Republic) Michael Vrbenský
(Australia) Li Tu	4	3
2	(Australia) James Duckworth	6	6

Final
6	(Belgium) Zizou Bergs	6	7
2	(Australia) James Duckworth	4	5

=== Top half ===
First round
1	(Germany) D Koepfer	5	6	6
Q	(Germany) Luca Wiedenmann	7	2	2
LL	(Poland) Olaf Pieczkowski	4	6	6
(Czech Republic) A Paulson	6	3	1
Q	(Canada) Benjamin Thomas George	6	7
(Zimbabwe) B Lock	1	5
(Australia) L Saville	1	1
6	(Belgium) Z Bergs	6	6
Q	(United States) Colin Markes	4	6	3
(Czech Republic) M Vrbenský	6	3	6
(Canada) S Diez	4	7^{9}	1
SE	(Canada) L Draxl	6	6^{7}	6
(United Kingdom) C Broom	7^{7}	4	6
WC	(Canada) J Boulais	6^{4}	6	2
(Poland) M Kaśnikowski	4	6	5
8	(Tunisia) A Dougaz	6	3	7

Second round
1	(Germany) D Koepfer	6	6
LL	(Poland) O Pieczkowski	4	4
Q	(Canada) BT George	3	2
6	(Belgium) Z Bergs	6	6
(Czech Republic) M Vrbenský	6^{4}	6	7
SE	(Canada) L Draxl	7^{7}	3	5
(United Kingdom) C Broom	6	4	1
8	(Tunisia) A Dougaz	3	6	6

Quarterfinals
1	(Germany) D Koepfer	4	6	5
6	(Belgium) Z Bergs	6	4	7
(Czech Republic) M Vrbenský	6	3	6
8	(Tunisia) A Dougaz	2	6	4

Semifinals
6	(Belgium) Z Bergs	w/o
(Czech Republic) M Vrbenský

=== Bottom half ===
First round
7	(Canada) A Galarneau	6	3	6
(Spain) D Jordà Sanchis	3	6	4
(France) M Janvier	6	6^{3}	3
(Australia) L Tu	4	7^{7}	6
(United Kingdom) T Samuel	6	0	3
(Portugal) J Sousa	3	6	6
WC	(Canada) JC Aguilar	3	4
3	(France) B Paire	6	6
5	(United Kingdom) R Peniston	6	6
Q	(New Zealand) K Pannu	3	1
WC	(Canada) D Martin	2
Q	(United States) Alexander Kotzen	1^{r}
(United States) T-S Kwiatkowski	7^{7}	0	7
Q	(United Kingdom) G Hussey	6^{4}	6	5
(United States) C Kingsley	5	7^{7}	6^{5}
2	(Australia) J Duckworth	7	6^{2}	7^{7}

Second round
7	(Canada) A Galarneau	6^{5}	2
(Australia) L Tu	7^{7}	6
(Portugal) J Sousa	6	7^{7}
3	(France) B Paire	1	6^{4}
5	(United Kingdom) R Peniston	6	0
WC	(Canada) D Martin	2	0^{r}
(United States) T-S Kwiatkowski	1	7^{7}	3
2	(Australia) J Duckworth	6	6^{3}	6

Quarterfinals
(Australia) L Tu	6	7
(Portugal) J Sousa	4	5
5	(United Kingdom) R Peniston	6	3	4
2	(Australia) J Duckworth	4	6	6

Semifinals
(Australia) L Tu	4	3
2	(Australia) J Duckworth	6	6
