= 2025 Savannah Challenger – Doubles =

Doubles
- 2025 Savannah Challenger

Final
- Champions: (Argentina) Federico Agustín Gómez (Venezuela) Luis David Martínez
- Runners-up: (United States) Mac Kiger (United States) Patrick Maloney
- Score: 3–6, 6–3, [10–5]

Events
| Singles | Doubles |
- Savannah Challenger

Christian Harrison and Marcus Willis were the defending champions but chose not to defend their title.

Federico Agustín Gómez and Luis David Martínez won the title after defeating Mac Kiger and Patrick Maloney 3–6, 6–3, [10–5] in the final.

== Seeds ==
1. (United States) Robert Cash / (United States) JJ Tracy (semifinals)
2. (Canada) Cleeve Harper / (United States) Ryan Seggerman (semifinals)
3. (Denmark) Johannes Ingildsen / (United Kingdom) David Stevenson (quarterfinals)
4. (Argentina) Federico Agustín Gómez / (Venezuela) Luis David Martínez (champions)

== Draw ==
Key

- Q = Qualifier
- WC = Wild card
- LL = Lucky loser
- Alt = Alternate
- ITF = ITF entry
- PR = Protected ranking
- SR = Special ranking
- SE = Special exempt
- JE = Junior exempt
- JR = Junior Accelerator Programme entrant
- CO = College Accelerator Programme entrant
- NG = Next Gen Accelerator Program entrant
- w/o = Walkover
- r = Retired
- d = Defaulted

=== Draw ===
First round
1 | (United States) R Cash (United States) JJ Tracy | 6 | 6
(Romania) GA Boitan (Kazakhstan) D Popko | 4 | 4
(Australia) J Charlton (Australia) P Harper | 7 | 4 | [3]
(United States) G Goldhoff (United States) T Hilderbrand | 5 | 6 | [10]
3 | (Denmark) J Ingildsen (United Kingdom) D Stevenson | 6 | 4 | [10]
PR | (United States) A Perez (United States) J Sheehy | 2 | 6 | [4]
WC | (United States) M Kiger (United States) Patrick Maloney | 6 | 6
(Philippines) FC Alcantara (Thailand) P Isaro | 1 | 1
Alt | (United States) Boris Kozlov (United States) S Kozlov | 3 | 6 | [9]
(Mexico) H Hach Verdugo (Colombia) N Mejía | 6 | 3 | [11]
(Zimbabwe) CJ Lock (Australia) B Tomic | 6^{7} | 3
4 | (Argentina) FA Gómez (Venezuela) LD Martínez | 7^{9} | 6
(Ecuador) A Andrade (United States) T Zink | 6 | 2 | [4]
WC | (United States) A Martin (United States) G Nanda | 3 | 6 | [10]
(Canada) L Draxl (Canada) B Sigouin | 2 | 2
2 | (Canada) C Harper (United States) R Seggerman | 6 | 6

Quarterfinals
1 | (United States) R Cash (United States) JJ Tracy | 6 | 7^{15}
(United States) G Goldhoff (United States) T Hilderbrand | 4 | 6^{13}
3 | (Denmark) J Ingildsen (United Kingdom) D Stevenson | 1 | 6 | [5]
WC | (United States) M Kiger (United States) P Maloney | 6 | 1 | [10]
(Mexico) H Hach Verdugo (Colombia) N Mejía | 6^{5} | 4
4 | (Argentina) FA Gómez (Venezuela) LD Martínez | 7^{7} | 6
WC | (United States) A Martin (United States) G Nanda | 4 | 4
2 | (Canada) C Harper (United States) R Seggerman | 6 | 6

Semifinals
1 | (United States) R Cash (United States) JJ Tracy | 3 | 4
WC | (United States) M Kiger (United States) P Maloney | 6 | 6
4 | (Argentina) FA Gómez (Venezuela) LD Martínez | 6 | 6
2 | (Canada) C Harper (United States) R Seggerman | 2 | 4

Final
WC | (United States) M Kiger (United States) P Maloney | 6 | 3 | [5]
4 | (Argentina) FA Gómez (Venezuela) LD Martínez | 3 | 6 | [10]
