= 2025 Tallahassee Tennis Challenger – Singles =

Singles
- 2025 Tallahassee Tennis Challenger

Final
- Champion: (Luxembourg) Chris Rodesch
- Runner-up: (United States) Emilio Nava
- Score: 4–6, 6–3, 6–4

Events
Singles	Doubles
- Tallahassee Tennis Challenger

Zizou Bergs was the defending champion but chose not to defend his title.

Chris Rodesch won the title after defeating Emilio Nava 4–6, 6–3, 6–4 in the final.

== Seeds ==
1. (United States) Eliot Spizzirri (first round)
2. (Chile) Tomás Barrios Vera (first round)
3. (United States) Mitchell Krueger (quarterfinals)
4. (Argentina) Federico Agustín Gómez (first round, retired)
5. (Kazakhstan) Dmitry Popko (second round)
6. (United States) Emilio Nava (final)
7. (United States) Jenson Brooksby (first round)
8. (Canada) Liam Draxl (second round)

== Draw ==
Key

- Q = Qualifier
- WC = Wild card
- LL = Lucky loser
- Alt = Alternate
- ITF = ITF entry
- PR = Protected ranking
- SR = Special ranking
- SE = Special exempt
- JE = Junior exempt
- JR = Junior Accelerator Programme entrant
- CO = College Accelerator Programme entrant
- NG = Next Gen Accelerator Program entrant
- w/o = Walkover
- r = Retired
- d = Defaulted

=== Finals ===
Semifinals
6	(United States) Emilio Nava	6	6
(France) Mathys Erhard	2	4
(Argentina) Andrea Collarini	2	6	4
(Luxembourg) Chris Rodesch	6	1	6

Final
6	(United States) Emilio Nava	6	3	4
(Luxembourg) Chris Rodesch	4	6	6

=== Top half ===
First round
1	(United States) E Spizzirri	3	5
(United States) M Cassone	6	7
(Austria) J Schwärzler	6	6
(France) M Martineau	4	4
(Peru) G Bueno	4	1
(Chinese Taipei) T-l Wu	6	6
Q	(Denmark) C Sigsgaard	4	4
6	(United States) Em Nava	6	6
3/WC	(United States) M Krueger	6	6
(Argentina) F Mena	3	4
(Romania) FC Jianu	4	4
(France) G Blancaneaux	6	6
(France) Mathys Erhard	6	5	6
Q	(United States) K Poling	2	7	4
WC	(United States) Patrick Maloney	6	6
7/WC	(United States) J Brooksby	4	3

Second round
(United States) M Cassone	6	7^{8}
(Austria) J Schwärzler	3	6^{6}
(Chinese Taipei) T-l Wu	4	4
6	(United States) Em Nava	6	6
3/WC	(United States) M Krueger	0	7^{7}	7^{7}
(France) G Blancaneaux	6	6^{5}	6^{4}
(France) M Erhard	3	6	7
WC	(United States) P Maloney	6	0	5

Quarterfinals
(United States) M Cassone	2	3
6	(United States) Em Nava	6	6
3/WC	(United States) M Krueger	6	6^{3}	6^{3}
(France) M Erhard	4	7^{7}	7^{7}

Semifinals
6	(United States) Em Nava	6	6
(France) M Erhard	2	4

=== Bottom half ===
First round
8	(Canada) L Draxl	6	5	6
Q	(Spain) I Montes de la Torre	4	7	1
(Peru) JP Varillas	3	7	4
(Argentina) A Collarini	6	5	6
(France) S Gueymard Wayenburg	0	0
(Canada) A Galarneau	6	6
Q	(Brazil) JL Reis da Silva	6	3
4	(Argentina) FA Gómez	4	2^{r}
5	(Kazakhstan) D Popko	7^{7}	6
Q	(Brazil) D Dutra da Silva	6^{2}	4
Q	(Bolivia) JC Prado Ángelo	4	1
(Luxembourg) C Rodesch	6	6
(Ecuador) A Andrade	6	6
(Paraguay) AD Vallejo	2	3
(United States) M Mmoh	6	6
2	(Chile) T Barrios Vera	3	3

Second round
8	(Canada) L Draxl	3	0
(Argentina) A Collarini	6	6
(Canada) A Galarneau	6^{4}	7^{9}	2
Q	(Brazil) JL Reis da Silva	7^{7}	6^{7}	6
5	(Kazakhstan) D Popko	3	6^{5}
(Luxembourg) C Rodesch	6	7^{7}
(Ecuador) A Andrade	7^{7}	1	6
(United States) M Mmoh	6^{5}	6	1

Quarterfinals
(Argentina) A Collarini	6	6
Q	(Brazil) JL Reis da Silva	4	2
(Luxembourg) C Rodesch	6	7
(Ecuador) A Andrade	4	5

Semifinals
(Argentina) A Collarini	2	6	4
(Luxembourg) C Rodesch	6	1	6
