= 2021 Kentucky Bank Tennis Championships – Singles =

Singles
- 2021 Kentucky Bank Tennis Championships

Final
- Champion: (Australia) Jason Kubler
- Runner-up: (Chile) Alejandro Tabilo
- Score: 7–5, 6–7^{(2–7)}, 7–5

Events
Singles	Doubles
← 2019 ·	Kentucky Bank Tennis Championships	· 2022 →

Jannik Sinner was the defending champion but chose not to defend his title.

Jason Kubler won the title after defeating Alejandro Tabilo 7–5, 6–7^{(2–7)}, 7–5 in the final.

== Seeds ==
1. (United States) Jenson Brooksby (quarterfinals)
2. (Australia) Alex Bolt (withdrew)
3. (United States) Maxime Cressy (second round)
4. (India) Prajnesh Gunneswaran (first round)
5. (Ecuador) Emilio Gómez (first round)
6. (Chile) Alejandro Tabilo (final)
7. (United States) Ernesto Escobedo (semifinals)
8. (Australia) Thanasi Kokkinakis (semifinals)

== Draw ==
=== Key ===
- Q = Qualifier
- WC = Wild card
- LL = Lucky loser
- Alt = Alternate
- ITF = ITF entry
- PR = Protected ranking
- SR = Special ranking
- SE = Special exempt
- JE = Junior exempt
- JR = Junior Accelerator Programme entrant
- CO = College Accelerator Programme entrant
- NG = Next Gen Accelerator Program entrant
- w/o = Walkover
- r = Retired
- d = Defaulted

=== Finals ===
Semifinals
8	(Australia) Thanasi Kokkinakis	6^{3}	7^{9}	3
6	(Chile) Alejandro Tabilo	7^{7}	6^{7}	6
7	(United States) Ernesto Escobedo	2	3
(Australia) Jason Kubler	6	6

Final
6	(Chile) Alejandro Tabilo	5	7^{7}	5
(Australia) Jason Kubler	7	6^{2}	7

=== Top half ===
First round
1	(United States) J Brooksby	6	6
WC	(Canada) L Draxl	3	3
(United States) U Blanch	6	6
Alt	(Japan) Shuichi Sekiguchi	3	4
LL	(Israel) E Leshem	1	2
(Argentina) JP Ficovich	6	6
(United States) C Harrison	5	7	2
8	(Australia) T Kokkinakis	7	5	6
4	(India) P Gunneswaran	3	4
(Canada) P Polansky	6	6
(Chinese Taipei) T-l Wu	4	0
(India) R Ramanathan	6	6
(United States) C Eubanks	6^{3}	6^{6}
Q	(United States) S Kozlov	7^{7}	7^{8}
WC	(United States) S Dostanic	2	0
6	(Chile) A Tabilo	6	6

Second round
1	(United States) J Brooksby	6^{6}	6
(United States) U Blanch	7^{8}	5^{r}
(Argentina) JP Ficovich	1	6	3
8	(Australia) T Kokkinakis	6	4	6
(Canada) P Polansky	4	4
(India) R Ramanathan	6	6
Q	(United States) S Kozlov	2	2
6	(Chile) A Tabilo	6	6

Quarterfinals
1	(United States) J Brooksby	4	6	4
8	(Australia) T Kokkinakis	6	2	6
(India) R Ramanathan	6^{4}	4
6	(Chile) A Tabilo	7^{7}	6

Semifinals
8	(Australia) T Kokkinakis	6^{3}	7^{9}	3
6	(Chile) A Tabilo	7^{7}	6^{7}	6

=== Bottom half ===
First round
7	(United States) E Escobedo	6	6
WC	(United States) G Nanda	1	4
(Dominican Republic) R Cid Subervi	3	6	6
(Denmark) M Torpegaard	6	4	2
Q	(Barbados) D King	6	6
(Ecuador) R Quiroz	4	1
(Japan) T Ito	6	3	4
3	(United States) M Cressy	4	6	6
5	(Ecuador) E Gómez	1	6	6^{6}
(Australia) J Kubler	6	3	7^{8}
(Colombia) N Mejía	6^{3}	6	1
Q	(United Kingdom) A McHugh	7^{7}	4	6
Alt	(India) S Mukund	6	6
(Canada) B Schnur	3	4
(United States) M Krueger	4	4
Q	(Argentina) GA Olivieri	6	6

Second round
7	(United States) E Escobedo	6	7^{7}
(Dominican Republic) R Cid Subervi	4	6^{1}
Q	(Barbados) D King	4	7^{7}	6
3	(United States) M Cressy	6	6^{2}	2
(Australia) J Kubler	6	6
Q	(United Kingdom) A McHugh	4	4
Alt	(India) S Mukund	3	3
Q	(Argentina) GA Olivieri	6	6

Quarterfinals
7	(United States) E Escobedo	7	6
Q	(Barbados) D King	5	0
(Australia) J Kubler	4	6	7
Q	(Argentina) GA Olivieri	6	3	5

Semifinals
7	(United States) E Escobedo	2	3
(Australia) J Kubler	6	6
