= 2025 Cary Tennis Classic – Men's doubles =

Men's doubles
- 2025 Cary Tennis Classic

Final
- Champions: (New Zealand) Finn Reynolds (New Zealand) James Watt
- Runners-up: (Australia) Patrick Harper (United States) Trey Hilderbrand
- Score: 6–3, 6–7^{(2–7)}, [10–5]

Events
Singles	men	women
Doubles	men	women
- Cary Tennis Classic

John Peers and John-Patrick Smith were the defending champions but chose not to defend their title.

Finn Reynolds and James Watt won the title after defeating Patrick Harper and Trey Hilderbrand 6–3, 6–7^{(2–7)}, [10–5] in the final.

== Seeds ==
1. (India) Niki Kaliyanda Poonacha / (India) Jeevan Nedunchezhiyan (first round)
2. (Australia) Patrick Harper / (United States) Trey Hilderbrand (final)
3. (New Zealand) Finn Reynolds / (New Zealand) James Watt (champions)
4. (Thailand) Pruchya Isaro / (Japan) Rio Noguchi (semifinals)

== Draw ==
Key

- Q = Qualifier
- WC = Wild card
- LL = Lucky loser
- Alt = Alternate
- ITF = ITF entry
- PR = Protected ranking
- SR = Special ranking
- SE = Special exempt
- JE = Junior exempt
- JR = Junior Accelerator Programme entrant
- CO = College Accelerator Programme entrant
- NG = Next Gen Accelerator Program entrant
- w/o = Walkover
- r = Retired
- d = Defaulted

=== Draw ===
First round
1	(India) N Kaliyanda Poonacha (India) J Nedunchezhiyan	7^{7}	2	[2]
(Australia) K Pearson (United States) J Sheehy	6^{4}	6	[10]
(Ecuador) A Andrade (United States) M Kiger	6	6
WC	(United States) Nick Mangiapane (United States) Kase Schinnerer	3	0
3	(New Zealand) F Reynolds (New Zealand) J Watt	7	6
(Japan) Ryuki Matsuda (Japan) N Tajima	5	1
(Australia) M Bouzige (United States) Andre Ilagan	4	4
(Colombia) N Mejía (China) Y Zhou	6	6
(Canada) L Draxl (Antigua and Barbuda) J Maginley	6	7^{7}
(Brazil) L Britto (United States) W Woodall	2	6^{5}
(Canada) K Stevenson (Australia) B Tomic	5	2
4	(Thailand) P Isaro (Japan) R Noguchi	7	6
(Japan) M Imamura (Japan) N Nakagawa	3	6	[11]
WC	(United States) William Manning (United States) B Shick	6	2	[13]
(Mexico) H Hach Verdugo (Colombia) C Rodríguez	4	4
2	(Australia) P Harper (United States) T Hilderbrand	6	6

Quarterfinals
(Australia) K Pearson (United States) J Sheehy	3	6^{5}
(Ecuador) A Andrade (United States) M Kiger	6	7^{7}
3	(New Zealand) F Reynolds (New Zealand) J Watt	6	7^{7}
(Colombia) N Mejía (China) Y Zhou	3	6^{4}
(Canada) L Draxl (Antigua and Barbuda) J Maginley	2	6^{3}
4	(Thailand) P Isaro (Japan) R Noguchi	6	7^{7}
WC	(United States) W Manning (United States) B Shick	7^{7}	6^{11}	[5]
2	(Australia) P Harper (United States) T Hilderbrand	6^{2}	7^{13}	[10]

Semifinals
(Ecuador) A Andrade (United States) M Kiger	0	6	[8]
3	(New Zealand) F Reynolds (New Zealand) J Watt	6	3	[10]
4	(Thailand) P Isaro (Japan) R Noguchi	3	6	[3]
2	(Australia) P Harper (United States) T Hilderbrand	6	3	[10]

Final
3	(New Zealand) F Reynolds (New Zealand) J Watt	6	6^{2}	[10]
2	(Australia) P Harper (United States) T Hilderbrand	3	7^{7}	[5]
