= 2024 Cary Tennis Classic – Women's singles =

Women's singles
- 2024 Cary Tennis Classic

Final
- Champion: (Spain) Nuria Párrizas Díaz
- Runner-up: (Mexico) Renata Zarazúa
- Score: 6–3, 3–6, 7–6^{(7–2)}

Events
Singles	men	women
Doubles	men	women
Cary Tennis Classic	· 2025 →

This was the first edition of the women's event.

Nuria Párrizas Díaz won the title, defeating Renata Zarazúa in the final, 6–3, 3–6, 7–6^{(7–2)}.

== Seeds ==
1. (Switzerland) Viktorija Golubic (quarterfinals)
2. (Mexico) Renata Zarazúa (final)
3. (Japan) Mai Hontama (first round)
4. (Spain) Rebeka Masarova (semifinals)
5. (United States) McCartney Kessler (first round)
6. (United States) Ann Li (first round)
7. (Spain) Nuria Párrizas Díaz (champion)
8. (Argentina) Julia Riera (first round)

== Draw ==
=== Key ===
- Q = Qualifier
- WC = Wild card
- LL = Lucky loser
- Alt = Alternate
- SE = Special exempt
- PR = Protected ranking
- ITF = ITF entry
- JE = Junior exempt
- w/o = Walkover
- r = Retired
- d = Defaulted
- SR = Special ranking

=== Finals ===
Semifinals
7	(Spain) Nuria Párrizas Díaz	6	6
4	(Spain) Rebeka Masarova	4	3
Q	(Italy) Lucrezia Stefanini	4	0^{r}
2	(Mexico) Renata Zarazúa	6	0

Final
7	(Spain) Nuria Párrizas Díaz	6	3	7^{7}
2	(Mexico) Renata Zarazúa	3	6	6^{2}

=== Top half ===
First round
1	(Switzerland) V Golubic	7	6
WC	(United States) A Smith	5	1
(United Kingdom) L Miyazaki	6^{2}	6	4
Q	(Australia) T Preston	7^{7}	3	6
Q	(Japan) E Shibahara	6	6
WC	(United States) K Penickova	2	1
(Hungary) D Gálfi	1	4
7	(Spain) N Párrizas Díaz	6	6
4	(Spain) R Masarova	6^{0}	6	6
(France) J Ponchet	7^{7}	3	3
WC	(United States) M Mateas	6	7^{7}
LL	(United States) V Hu	4	6^{3}
Q	(Thailand) M Sawangkaew	7^{8}	7
(Czech Republic) L Fruhvirtová	6^{6}	5
Q	(Canada) R Marino	3	6	6
5	(United States) M Kessler	6	4	2

Second round
1	(Switzerland) V Golubic	6	6
Q	(Australia) T Preston	4	3
Q	(Japan) E Shibahara	3	7^{7}	4
7	(Spain) N Párrizas Díaz	6	6^{5}	6
4	(Spain) R Masarova	1	6	7^{7}
WC	(United States) M Mateas	6	4	6^{2}
Q	(Thailand) M Sawangkaew	7^{7}	7^{7}
Q	(Canada) R Marino	6^{4}	6^{3}

Quarterfinals
1	(Switzerland) V Golubic	3	3
7	(Spain) N Párrizas Díaz	6	6
4	(Spain) R Masarova	6	6
Q	(Thailand) M Sawangkaew	4	2

Semifinals
7	(Spain) N Párrizas Díaz	6	6
4	(Spain) R Masarova	4	3

=== Bottom half ===
First round
6	(United States) A Li	3	6^{7}
SE	(Netherlands) A Hartono	6	7^{9}
(Ukraine) Y Starodubtseva	6	7^{7}
(Japan) N Hibino	4	6^{2}
(Australia) K Birrell	3	2
Q	(United Kingdom) H Watson	6	6
Q	(Italy) L Stefanini	6	5	6
3	(Japan) M Hontama	4	7	4
8	(Argentina) J Riera	3	1
(Philippines) A Eala	6	6
Q	O Selekhmeteva	6	6
Q	(United States) H Inoue	4	2
SE	(China) S Wei	7	6
(Slovenia) T Zidanšek	5	2
WC	(United States) K Day	4	5
2	(Mexico) R Zarazúa	6	7

Second round
SE	(Netherlands) A Hartono	6	6
(Ukraine) Y Starodubtseva	3	3
Q	(United Kingdom) H Watson	4	6	6^{3}
Q	(Italy) L Stefanini	6	1	7^{7}
(Philippines) A Eala	7^{7}	7^{7}
Q	O Selekhmeteva	6^{5}	6^{4}
SE	(China) S Wei	4	6^{1}
2	(Mexico) R Zarazúa	6	7^{7}

Quarterfinals
SE	(Netherlands) A Hartono	5	5
Q	(Italy) L Stefanini	7	7
(Philippines) A Eala	6	4	3
2	(Mexico) R Zarazúa	3	6	6

Semifinals
Q	(Italy) L Stefanini	4	0^{r}
2	(Mexico) R Zarazúa	6	0
