= 2023 Challenger Banque Nationale de Drummondville =

- Date: November 13 – 19
- Edition: 16th
- Category: ATP Challenger Tour
- Surface: Hard (indoor)
- Location: Drummondville, Canada

Champions

Singles
- (Belgium) Zizou Bergs

Doubles
- (Sweden) André Göransson / (United Kingdom) Toby Samuel
← 2022 ·	Challenger de Drummondville	· 2024 →

The 2023 Challenger Banque Nationale de Drummondville was a professional tennis tournament played on indoor hard courts. It was the 16th edition of the tournament and part of the 2023 ATP Challenger Tour. It took place in Drummondville, Canada between November 13 and 19, 2023.

== Singles main-draw entrants ==
=== Seeds ===
Country	Player	Rank^{1}	Seed
GER	Dominik Koepfer	71	1
AUS	James Duckworth	113	2
FRA	Benoît Paire	124	3
~~CAN~~	~~Gabriel Diallo~~	~~133~~	~~4~~
GBR	Ryan Peniston	178	5
BEL	Zizou Bergs	180	6
CAN	Alexis Galarneau	187	7
TUN	Aziz Dougaz	242	8

- ^{1} Rankings are as of November 6, 2023.

=== Other entrants ===
The following players received wildcards into the singles main draw:

- (Canada) Juan Carlos Aguilar
- (Canada) Justin Boulais
- (Canada) Dan Martin

The following player received entry into the singles main draw as a special exempt:

- (Canada) Liam Draxl

The following players received entry from the qualifying draw:

- (Canada) Benjamin Thomas George
- (United Kingdom) Giles Hussey
- (United States) Alexander Kotzen
- (United States) Colin Markes
- (New Zealand) Kiranpal Pannu
- (Germany) Luca Wiedenmann

The following player received entry as a lucky loser:

- (Poland) Olaf Pieczkowski

== Champions ==
=== Singles ===
- (Belgium) Zizou Bergs def. (Australia) James Duckworth 6–4, 7–5.

=== Doubles ===
- (Sweden) André Göransson / (United Kingdom) Toby Samuel def. (Canada) Liam Draxl / (United Kingdom) Giles Hussey 6–7^{(2–7)}, 6–3, [10–8].
