= 2025 Cary Tennis Classic – Men's singles =

Men's singles
- 2025 Cary Tennis Classic

Final
- Champion: (Japan) Rei Sakamoto
- Runner-up: (Canada) Liam Draxl
- Score: 6–1, 6–4

Events
| Singles | men | women |
| Doubles | men | women |
| ← 2024 · | Cary Tennis Classic | · 2026 → |

Roman Safiullin was the defending champion but chose not to defend his title.

Rei Sakamoto won the title after defeating Liam Draxl 6–1, 6–4 in the final.

== Seeds ==
1. (Australia) Tristan Schoolkate (quarterfinals)
2. (Canada) Liam Draxl (final)
3. (Australia) Omar Jasika (first round)
4. (Canada) Alexis Galarneau (quarterfinals)
5. Aslan Karatsev (withdrew)
6. (Japan) Rio Noguchi (first round)
7. (Colombia) Nicolás Mejía (first round)
8. (United States) Patrick Kypson (semifinals)
9. (Australia) Bernard Tomic (first round)

== Draw ==
=== Key ===
- Q = Qualifier
- WC = Wild card
- LL = Lucky loser
- Alt = Alternate
- ITF = ITF entry
- PR = Protected ranking
- SR = Special ranking
- SE = Special exempt
- JE = Junior exempt
- JR = Junior Accelerator Programme entrant
- CO = College Accelerator Programme entrant
- NG = Next Gen Accelerator Program entrant
- w/o = Walkover
- r = Retired
- d = Defaulted

=== Finals ===
Semifinals
(Japan) Rei Sakamoto | 7^{7} | 7^{8}
8 | (United States) Patrick Kypson | 6^{1} | 6^{6}
(China) Wu Yibing | 4 | 2
2 | (Canada) Liam Draxl | 6 | 6

Final
(Japan) Rei Sakamoto | 6 | 6
2 | (Canada) Liam Draxl | 1 | 4

=== Top half ===
First round
1 | (Australia) T Schoolkate | 7^{7} | 6^{4} | 6
(China) Y Zhou | 6^{5} | 7^{7} | 1
Q | (United States) A Rybakov | 5 | 5
Alt | (United States) Andre Ilagan | 7 | 7
(United States) Patrick Maloney | 6 | 3 | 7^{8}
Q | (United States) S Kirchheimer | 2 | 6 | 6^{6}
(Japan) R Sakamoto | 6^{8} | 6 | 6
7 | (Colombia) N Mejía | 7^{10} | 3 | 3
4 | (Canada) A Galarneau | 7^{7} | 7^{7}
JR | (South Korea) Roh Ho-young | 6^{2} | 6^{1}
WC | (United States) S Dostanic | 4 | 7 | 3
Alt | (United States) A Martin | 6 | 5 | 6
(Japan) N Nakagawa | 1 | 5
(Brazil) K Sell | 6 | 7
Alt | (Japan) M Imamura | 3 | 4
8 | (United States) P Kypson | 6 | 6

Second round
1 | (Australia) T Schoolkate | 6 | 3 | 6
Alt | (United States) A Ilagan | 1 | 6 | 2
(United States) P Maloney | 6 | 1 | 2
(Japan) R Sakamoto | 3 | 6 | 6
4 | (Canada) A Galarneau | 2 | 6 | 6
Alt | (United States) A Martin | 6 | 3 | 3
(Brazil) K Sell | 6^{3} | 3
8 | (United States) P Kypson | 7^{7} | 6

Quarterfinals
1 | (Australia) T Schoolkate | 6^{2} | 4
(Japan) R Sakamoto | 7^{7} | 6
4 | (Canada) A Galarneau | 7 | 3 | 4
8 | (United States) P Kypson | 5 | 6 | 6

Semifinals
(Japan) R Sakamoto | 7^{7} | 7^{8}
8 | (United States) P Kypson | 6^{1} | 6^{6}

=== Bottom half ===
First round
9 | (Australia) B Tomic | 4 | 4
JR | (United States) K Bigun | 6 | 6
(China) Y Wu | 6 | 6
WC | (United States) Ian Mayew | 3 | 3
WC | (United States) William Manning | 7^{7} | 3 | 4
Q | (Estonia) D Glinka | 6^{5} | 6 | 6
Q | (United States) M Zheng | 6 | 6
3 | (Australia) O Jasika | 2 | 2
6 | (Japan) R Noguchi | 5 | 6 | 3
Q | (Japan) H Moriya | 7 | 2 | 6
(Ecuador) A Andrade | 1 | 3
(United States) A Mayo | 6 | 6
Q | (United States) J Sheehy | 7 | 6
(Chinese Taipei) T-l Wu | 5 | 2
PR | (Australia) P Sekulic | 2 | 2
2 | (Canada) L Draxl | 6 | 6

Second round
JR | (United States) K Bigun | 5 | 2
(China) Y Wu | 7 | 6
Q | (Estonia) D Glinka | 4 | 4
Q | (United States) M Zheng | 6 | 6
Q | (Japan) H Moriya | 4 | 4
(United States) A Mayo | 6 | 6
Q | (United States) J Sheehy | 2 | 2
2 | (Canada) L Draxl | 6 | 6

Quarterfinals
(China) Y Wu | 6 | 6
Q | (United States) M Zheng | 2 | 3
(United States) A Mayo | 2 | 5
2 | (Canada) L Draxl | 6 | 7

Semifinals
(China) Y Wu | 4 | 2
2 | (Canada) L Draxl | 6 | 6
