= 2024 Cary Tennis Classic – Women's doubles =

Women's doubles
- 2024 Cary Tennis Classic

Final
- Champions: (Switzerland) Céline Naef (Slovenia) Tamara Zidanšek
- Runners-up: (Georgia (country)) Oksana Kalashnikova; Iryna Shymanovich
- Score: 4–6, 6–3, [11–9]

Events
Singles	men	women
Doubles	men	women
Cary Tennis Classic	· 2025 →

This was the first edition of the women's event.

Céline Naef and Tamara Zidanšek won the title, defeating Oksana Kalashnikova and Iryna Shymanovich in the final, 4–6, 6–3, [11–9].

== Seeds ==
1. (Georgia (country)) Oksana Kalashnikova / Iryna Shymanovich (final)
2. (Japan) Nao Hibino / (Switzerland) Conny Perrin (first round)
3. (United Kingdom) Eden Silva / Anastasia Tikhonova (quarterfinals)
4. (United States) Carmen Corley / (United States) Ivana Corley (first round)

== Draw ==
=== Key ===
- Q = Qualifier
- WC = Wild card
- LL = Lucky loser
- Alt = Alternate
- SE = Special exempt
- PR = Protected ranking
- ITF = ITF entry
- JE = Junior exempt
- w/o = Walkover
- r = Retired
- d = Defaulted
- SR = Special ranking

First round
1	(Georgia (country)) O Kalashnikova; I Shymanovich	6	7
(Argentina) J Riera (Mexico) R Zarazúa	4	5
WC	(United States) I Barrera Aguirre (United States) A Reami	1	6	[10]
WC	(United States) T Evans (United States) C Tanguilig	6	0	[4]
3	(United Kingdom) E Silva; A Tikhonova	4	7	[10]
(Spain) N Párrizas Díaz (United Kingdom) E Webley-Smith	6	5	[2]
WC	(United States) E Coleman (United States) E Yu
(Hong Kong) E Chong (United States) J Loeb	w/o
J Avdeeva; A Falei	3	6^{3}
(United States) C Rosca (United States) A Smith	6	7^{7}
(Switzerland) C Naef (Slovenia) T Zidanšek	6	6
4	(United States) C Corley (United States) I Corley	1	3
(Australia) K Birrell (Australia) P Hon	2	2
(Australia) T Gibson (Australia) M Joint	6	6
(Canada) R Marino (France) J Ponchet	6	6
2	(Japan) N Hibino (Switzerland) C Perrin	2	4

Quarterfinals
1	(Georgia (country)) O Kalashnikova; I Shymanovich	6	6
WC	(United States) I Barrera Aguirre (United States) A Reami	3	3
3	(United Kingdom) E Silva; A Tikhonova	6	2	[7]
(Hong Kong) E Chong (United States) J Loeb	3	6	[10]
(United States) C Rosca (United States) A Smith	5	3
(Switzerland) C Naef (Slovenia) T Zidanšek	7	6
(Australia) T Gibson (Australia) M Joint	6	6
(Canada) R Marino (France) J Ponchet	4	1

Semifinals
1	(Georgia (country)) O Kalashnikova; I Shymanovich	2	6	[11]
(Hong Kong) E Chong (United States) J Loeb	6	3	[9]
(Switzerland) C Naef (Slovenia) T Zidanšek	w/o
(Australia) T Gibson (Australia) M Joint

Final
1	(Georgia (country)) O Kalashnikova; I Shymanovich	6	3	[9]
(Switzerland) C Naef (Slovenia) T Zidanšek	4	6	[11]
