= 2025 Savannah Challenger =

- Date: 21 – 27 April
- Edition: 15th
- Surface: Green clay
- Location: Savannah, Georgia, United States

Champions

Singles
- (Colombia) Nicolás Mejía

Doubles
- (Argentina) Federico Agustín Gómez / (Venezuela) Luis David Martínez
- Savannah Challenger

The 2025 Savannah Challenger was a professional tennis tournament played on clay courts. It was the 15th edition of the tournament which was part of the 2025 ATP Challenger Tour. It took place in Savannah, Georgia, United States between April 21 and April 27, 2025.

== Singles main-draw entrants ==
=== Seeds ===
Country	Player	Rank^{1}	Seed
USA	Eliot Spizzirri	125	1
ARG	Federico Agustín Gómez	136	2
USA	Emilio Nava	140	3
CAN	Liam Draxl	159	4
KAZ	Dmitry Popko	161	5
USA	Jenson Brooksby	168	6
~~CAN~~	~~Alexis Galarneau~~	~~184~~	~~7~~
AUS	Bernard Tomic	232	8

- ^{1} Rankings are as of April 14, 2025.

=== Other entrants ===
The following players received wildcards into the singles main draw:

- (United States) Jenson Brooksby
- (United States) Andres Martin
- (United States) Alfredo Perez

The following player received entry into the singles main draw as a special exempt:

- (Germany) Max Wiskandt

The following players received entry into the singles main draw as alternates:

- (France) Corentin Denolly
- (France) Maxime Janvier
- (Argentina) Genaro Alberto Olivieri

The following players received entry from the qualifying draw:

- (United States) Garrett Johns
- (United States) Stefan Kozlov
- (United States) Patrick Kypson
- (United States) Patrick Maloney
- (United States) Tristan McCormick
- (Brazil) João Lucas Reis da Silva

The following player received entry as a lucky loser:

- (United States) Ryan Seggerman

== Champions ==
=== Singles ===
- (Colombia) Nicolás Mejía def. (Canada) Liam Draxl 2–6, 6–2, 7–6^{(7–3)}.

=== Doubles ===
- (Argentina) Federico Agustín Gómez / (Venezuela) Luis David Martínez def. (United States) Mac Kiger / (United States) Patrick Maloney 3–6, 6–3, [10–5].
