= 2025 Savannah Challenger – Singles =

Singles
- 2025 Savannah Challenger

Final
- Champion: (Colombia) Nicolás Mejía
- Runner-up: (Canada) Liam Draxl
- Score: 2–6, 6–2, 7–6^{(7–3)}

Events
Singles	Doubles
- Savannah Challenger

Alexander Ritschard was the defending champion but chose not to defend his title.

Nicolás Mejía won the title after defeating Liam Draxl 2–6, 6–2, 7–6^{(7–3)} in the final.

== Seeds ==
1. (United States) Eliot Spizzirri (semifinals)
2. (Argentina) Federico Agustín Gómez (first round)
3. (United States) Emilio Nava (first round)
4. (Canada) Liam Draxl (final)
5. (Kazakhstan) Dmitry Popko (first round)
6. (United States) Jenson Brooksby (first round)
7. (Canada) Alexis Galarneau (withdrew)
8. (Australia) Bernard Tomic (second round)

== Draw ==
Key

- Q = Qualifier
- WC = Wild card
- LL = Lucky loser
- Alt = Alternate
- ITF = ITF entry
- PR = Protected ranking
- SR = Special ranking
- SE = Special exempt
- JE = Junior exempt
- JR = Junior Accelerator Programme entrant
- CO = College Accelerator Programme entrant
- NG = Next Gen Accelerator Program entrant
- w/o = Walkover
- r = Retired
- d = Defaulted

=== Finals ===
Semifinals
1	(United States) Eliot Spizzirri	4	7	3
(Colombia) Nicolás Mejía	6	5	6
4	(Canada) Liam Draxl	7	6
Alt	(Argentina) Genaro Alberto Olivieri	5	4

Final
(Colombia) Nicolás Mejía	2	6	7^{7}
4	(Canada) Liam Draxl	6	2	6^{3}

=== Top half ===
First round
1	(United States) E Spizzirri	6	6
LL	(United States) R Seggerman	4	4
WC	(United States) A Perez	6	3	6
Q	(United States) P Kypson	4	6	3
SE	(Germany) M Wiskandt	2	1
Q	(United States) S Kozlov	6	6
(France) G Blancaneaux	6	6
6/WC	(United States) J Brooksby	4	3
3	(United States) Em Nava	3	4
(Austria) J Schwärzler	6	6
(Colombia) N Mejía	7	7
Alt	(France) M Janvier	5	5
(France) S Gueymard Wayenburg	7	4	0
(France) M Martineau	5	6	6
(Chinese Taipei) T-l Wu	6	6
Q	(United States) Tristan McCormick	3	2

Second round
1	(United States) E Spizzirri	6	6
WC	(United States) A Perez	3	1
Q	(United States) S Kozlov	6	3
(France) G Blancaneaux	1	1^{r}
(Austria) J Schwärzler	4	0
(Colombia) N Mejía	6	6
(France) M Martineau	2	3
(Chinese Taipei) T-l Wu	6	6

Quarterfinals
1	(United States) E Spizzirri	6	7
Q	(United States) S Kozlov	3	5
(Colombia) N Mejía	6	3	7^{7}
(Chinese Taipei) T-l Wu	2	6	6^{4}

Semifinals
1	(United States) E Spizzirri	4	7	3
(Colombia) N Mejía	6	5	6

=== Bottom half ===
First round
5	(Kazakhstan) D Popko	4	5
Q	(Brazil) JL Reis da Silva	6	7
(United Kingdom) O Crawford	6	4	6
Alt	(France) C Denolly	2	6	3
Q	(United States) Patrick Maloney	6	6
(United States) A Mayo	3	3
Q	(United States) G Johns	5	1
4	(Canada) L Draxl	7	6
8	(Australia) B Tomic	6	0	6
(United States) M Mmoh	4	6	2
WC	(United States) A Martin	7^{8}	3	7^{7}
(Luxembourg) C Rodesch	6^{6}	6	6^{3}
(France) Mathys Erhard	5	6^{1}
Alt	(Argentina) GA Olivieri	7	7^{7}
(Ecuador) A Andrade	6	6
2	(Argentina) FA Gómez	1	1

Second round
Q	(Brazil) JL Reis da Silva	3	6	4
(United Kingdom) O Crawford	6	4	6
Q	(United States) P Maloney	5	5
4	(Canada) L Draxl	7	7
8	(Australia) B Tomic	2	3
WC	(United States) A Martin	6	6
Alt	(Argentina) GA Olivieri	6	6
(Ecuador) A Andrade	3	3

Quarterfinals
(United Kingdom) O Crawford	3	7^{9}	2
4	(Canada) L Draxl	6	6^{7}	6
WC	(United States) A Martin	4	2
Alt	(Argentina) GA Olivieri	6	6

Semifinals
4	(Canada) L Draxl	7	6
Alt	(Argentina) GA Olivieri	5	4
