= 2021 Kentucky Bank Tennis Championships – Doubles =

Doubles
- 2021 Kentucky Bank Tennis Championships

Final
- Champions: (Canada) Liam Draxl (United States) Stefan Kozlov
- Runners-up: (United States) Alex Rybakov (United States) Reese Stalder
- Score: 6–2, 6–7^{(5–7)}, [10–7]

Events
Singles	Doubles
- Kentucky Bank Tennis Championships

Diego Hidalgo and Martin Redlicki were the defending champions but chose not to defend their title.

Liam Draxl and Stefan Kozlov won the title after defeating Alex Rybakov and Reese Stalder 6–2, 6–7^{(5–7)}, [10–7] in the final.

== Seeds ==
1. (France) Sadio Doumbia / (France) Fabien Reboul (first round)
2. (India) Sriram Balaji / (Switzerland) Luca Margaroli (first round)
3. (United States) Christian Harrison / (United States) Dennis Novikov (semifinals)
4. (United States) Christopher Eubanks / (South Africa) Ruan Roelofse (quarterfinals)

== Draw ==
Key

- Q = Qualifier
- WC = Wild card
- LL = Lucky loser
- Alt = Alternate
- ITF = ITF entry
- PR = Protected ranking
- SR = Special ranking
- SE = Special exempt
- JE = Junior exempt
- JR = Junior Accelerator Programme entrant
- CO = College Accelerator Programme entrant
- NG = Next Gen Accelerator Program entrant
- w/o = Walkover
- r = Retired
- d = Defaulted

First round
1	(France) S Doumbia (France) F Reboul	6	6^{2}	[6]
(Canada) P Polansky (Canada) B Schnur	2	7^{7}	[10]
(Ecuador) E Gómez (Chile) A Tabilo	1	5
WC	(Canada) L Draxl (United States) S Kozlov	6	7
4	(United States) C Eubanks (South Africa) R Roelofse	6	6
(Bolivia) B Arias (Argentina) GA Olivieri	4	1
(Cyprus) P Chrysochos (United Kingdom) A McHugh	6	4	[5]
(Colombia) N Mejía (Ecuador) R Quiroz	0	6	[10]
(Dominican Republic) R Cid Subervi (Chinese Taipei) T-l Wu	6	6
(Japan) T Ito (Japan) Shuichi Sekiguchi	3	3
(India) VS Prashanth (India) R Ramanathan	6	3	[5]
3	(United States) C Harrison (United States) D Novikov	4	6	[10]
WC	(United States) S Dostanic (United States) G Nanda	6	6
Alt	(United States) Jack Vance (United States) Tennyson Whiting	4	2
WC	(United States) A Rybakov (United States) R Stalder	7^{7}	6
2	(India) S Balaji (Switzerland) L Margaroli	6^{4}	4

Quarterfinals
(Canada) P Polansky (Canada) B Schnur	4	6	[7]
WC	(Canada) L Draxl (United States) S Kozlov	6	3	[10]
4	(United States) C Eubanks (South Africa) R Roelofse	6	5	[8]
(Colombia) N Mejía (Ecuador) R Quiroz	3	7	[10]
(Dominican Republic) R Cid Subervi (Chinese Taipei) T-l Wu	5	3
3	(United States) C Harrison (United States) D Novikov	7	6
WC	(United States) S Dostanic (United States) G Nanda	3	6	[9]
WC	(United States) A Rybakov (United States) R Stalder	6	4	[11]

Semifinals
WC	(Canada) L Draxl (United States) S Kozlov	6	6
(Colombia) N Mejía (Ecuador) R Quiroz	4	3
3	(United States) C Harrison (United States) D Novikov	6^{4}	6^{3}
WC	(United States) A Rybakov (United States) R Stalder	7^{7}	7^{7}

Final
WC	(Canada) L Draxl (United States) S Kozlov	6	6^{5}	[10]
WC	(United States) A Rybakov (United States) R Stalder	2	7^{7}	[7]
