= 2024 Puerto Vallarta Open =

- Date: 18–24 November
- Edition: 5th
- Surface: Hard
- Location: Puerto Vallarta, Mexico

Champions

Singles
- (United States) Nishesh Basavareddy

Doubles
- (Canada) Liam Draxl / (Canada) Benjamin Sigouin
- Puerto Vallarta Open

The 2024 Puerto Vallarta Open was a professional tennis tournament played on hardcourts. It was the fifth edition of the tournament which was part of the 2024 ATP Challenger Tour. It took place in Puerto Vallarta, Mexico between 18 and 24 November 2024.

== Singles main-draw entrants ==
=== Seeds ===
Country	Player	Rank^{1}	Seed
USA	Nishesh Basavareddy	172	1
TUN	Aziz Dougaz	210	2
~~USA~~	~~Eliot Spizzirri~~	~~231~~	~~3~~
~~BRA~~	~~Karue Sell~~	~~268~~	~~4~~
~~BEL~~	~~Michael Geerts~~	~~301~~	~~5~~
CAN	Liam Draxl	323	6
USA	Andre Ilagan	370	7
ARG	Valerio Aboian	379	8
BUL	Dimitar Kuzmanov	381	9
LUX	Chris Rodesch	385	10

- ^{1} Rankings are as of 11 November 2024.

=== Other entrants ===
The following players received wildcards into the singles main draw:

- (Mexico) Luis Carlos Álvarez
- (Mexico) Alex Hernández
- (Mexico) Santiago Ledesma

The following players received entry into the singles main draw as alternates:

- (United States) Felix Corwin
- (Mexico) Ernesto Escobedo
- (Germany) Mats Rosenkranz
- (United States) Keegan Smith

The following players received entry from the qualifying draw:

- (United Kingdom) Patrick Brady
- (Costa Rica) Rodrigo Crespo Piedra
- (Germany) Elmar Ejupovic
- (Mexico) Alan Magadán
- (Venezuela) Gonzalo Oliveira
- (United States) Alfredo Perez

The following player received entry as a lucky loser:

- (United States) Strong Kirchheimer

== Champions ==
=== Singles ===
- (United States) Nishesh Basavareddy def. (Canada) Liam Draxl 6–3, 7–6^{(7–4)}.

=== Doubles ===
- (Canada) Liam Draxl / (Canada) Benjamin Sigouin def. (United States) Karl Poling / (United States) Ryan Seggerman 7–6^{(7–5)}, 6–2.
