= 2025 Cary Tennis Classic – Women's singles =

Women's singles
- 2025 Cary Tennis Classic

Final
- Champion: (Czech Republic) Darja Vidmanova
- Runner-up: (United States) Monika Ekstrand
- Score: 6–3, 6-1

Events
Singles	men	women
Doubles	men	women
- Cary Tennis Classic

Nuria Párrizas Díaz was the defending champion but chose not to participate.

Darja Vidmanova won the title, defeating Monika Ekstrand in the final, 6–3, 6-1.

== Seeds ==
1. (United States) Whitney Osuigwe (first round)
2. (Australia) Destanee Aiava (first round)
3. (Italy) Lucrezia Stefanini (quarterfinals)
4. (Netherlands) Arianne Hartono (second round)
5. (Georgia (country)) Mariam Bolkvadze (second round)
6. (United States) Hanna Chang (first round)
7. (Canada) Kayla Cross (first round)
8. (Switzerland) Leonie Küng (first round)

== Draw ==
Key

- Q = Qualifier
- WC = Wild card
- LL = Lucky loser
- Alt = Alternate
- ITF = ITF entry
- PR = Protected ranking
- SR = Special ranking
- SE = Special exempt
- JE = Junior exempt
- JR = Junior Accelerator Programme entrant
- CO = College Accelerator Programme entrant
- NG = Next Gen Accelerator Program entrant
- w/o = Walkover
- r = Retired
- d = Defaulted

=== Finals ===
Semifinals
(Czech Republic) Darja Vidmanova	6	7
(China) Ma Yexin	1	5
(Canada) Cadence Brace	4	0
Q	(United States) Monika Ekstrand	6	6

Final
(Czech Republic) Darja Vidmanova	6	6
Q	(United States) Monika Ekstrand	3	1

=== Top half ===
First round
1	(United States) W Osuigwe	3	5
Q	(United States) R Gailis	6	7
Q	(Japan) M Crossley	6^{2}	6	4
Q	(Japan) W Sonobe	7^{7}	3	6
(Japan) H Sakatsume	6	1	4
WC	(United States) M Brengle	1	6	6
(Czech Republic) D Vidmanova	3	6	6
7	(Canada) K Cross	6	4	1
4	(Netherlands) A Hartono	6	6
WC	(United States) M Zampardo	1	4
Q	(United States) UM Arconada	1	2
(China) Y Ma	6	6
Q	(United States) V Hu	2	4
(Japan) M Yamaguchi	6	6
(United States) E Kalieva	6	6
6	(United States) H Chang	1	3

Second round
Q	(United States) R Gailis	0	6	1
Q	(Japan) W Sonobe	6	4	6
WC	(United States) M Brengle	0^{r}
(Czech Republic) D Vidmanova	1
4	(Netherlands) A Hartono	4	1
(China) Y Ma	6	6
(Japan) M Yamaguchi	1	3
(United States) E Kalieva	6	6

Quarterfinals
Q	(Japan) W Sonobe	7^{11}	3	0
(Czech Republic) D Vidmanova	6^{9}	6	6
(China) Y Ma	6	6
(United States) E Kalieva	1	0

Semifinals
(Czech Republic) D Vidmanova	6	7
(China) Y Ma	1	5

=== Bottom half ===
First round
8	(Switzerland) L Küng	3	5
Q	(China) X You	6	7
WC	(United States) R Brantmeier	1	6^{5}
(Canada) C Brace	6	7^{7}
(United States) M Mateas	6	6
Q	(United States) L Ma	4	4
Q	(Italy) E Bektas	5	3
3	(Italy) L Stefanini	7	6
5	(Georgia (country)) M Bolkvadze	6	6
WC	(United States) F Crawley	3	1
Q	(United States) M Ekstrand	2	7	6
(United States) M Stoiana	6	5	2
(United States) A Rogers	6	6
(United States) M Jones	2	3
(United States) E Mandlik	3	6	7^{7}
2	(Australia) D Aiava	6	3	6^{3}

Second round
Q	(China) X You	7	0	2
(Canada) C Brace	5	6	6
Q	(United States) M Mateas	4	4
3	(Italy) L Stefanini	6	6
5	(Georgia (country)) M Bolkvadze	6	6^{3}	3
Q	(United States) M Ekstrand	2	7^{7}	6
(United States) A Rogers	6	2	1
(United States) E Mandlik	4	6	6

Quarterfinals
(Canada) C Brace	7^{7}	6
3	(Italy) L Stefanini	6^{5}	2
Q	(United States) M Ekstrand	5	6	6
(United States) E Mandlik	7	4	2

Semifinals
(Canada) C Brace	4	0
Q	(United States) M Ekstrand	6	6
