= 2021 Kentucky Bank Tennis Championships =

Tennis Championships

- Date: 26 July–1 August
- Edition: 25th
- Surface: Hard
- Location: Lexington, United States

Champions

Singles
- (Australia) Jason Kubler

Doubles
- (Canada) Liam Draxl / (United States) Stefan Kozlov
- Lexington Challenger

The 2021 Kentucky Bank Tennis Championships was a professional tennis tournament played on outdoor hard courts. It was the 25th edition of the tournament and was part of the 2021 ATP Challenger Tour. It took place in Lexington, United States, on 26 July–1 August 2021.

== Singles main draw entrants ==
=== Seeds ===
Country	Player	Rank^{1}	Seed
USA	Jenson Brooksby	126	1
~~AUS~~	~~Alex Bolt~~	~~148~~	~~2~~
USA	Maxime Cressy	149	3
IND	Prajnesh Gunneswaran	156	4
ECU	Emilio Gómez	168	5
CHI	Alejandro Tabilo	172	6
USA	Ernesto Escobedo	182	7
AUS	Thanasi Kokkinakis	183	8

- ^{1} Rankings as of 19 July 2021.

=== Other entrants ===
The following players received a wildcard into the singles main draw:

- (United States) Stefan Dostanic
- (Canada) Liam Draxl
- (United States) Govind Nanda

The following players received entry into the singles main draw as alternates:

- (India) Sasikumar Mukund
- (Japan) Shuichi Sekiguchi

The following players received entry from the qualifying draw:

- (Barbados) Darian King
- (United States) Stefan Kozlov
- (United Kingdom) Aidan McHugh
- (Argentina) Genaro Alberto Olivieri

The following player received entry as a lucky loser:

- (Israel) Edan Leshem

== Champions ==
=== Singles ===
- (Australia) Jason Kubler def. (Chile) Alejandro Tabilo 7–5, 6–7^{(2–7)}, 7–5.

=== Doubles ===
- (Canada) Liam Draxl / (United States) Stefan Kozlov def. (United States) Alex Rybakov / (United States) Reese Stalder 6–2, 6–7^{(5–7)}, [10–7].
