= 2024 Cary Tennis Classic – Men's doubles =

Men's doubles
- 2024 Cary Tennis Classic

Final
- Champions: (Australia) John Peers (Australia) John-Patrick Smith
- Runners-up: (Argentina) Federico Agustín Gómez (Greece) Petros Tsitsipas
- Score: Walkover

Events
Singles	men	women
Doubles	men	women
- Cary Tennis Classic

Andrew Harris and Rinky Hijikata were the defending champions but chose not to defend their title.

John Peers and John-Patrick Smith won the title after Federico Agustín Gómez and Petros Tsitsipas withdrew before the final.

== Seeds ==
1. (Uruguay) Ariel Behar / (United Kingdom) Luke Johnson (semifinals)
2. (Australia) John Peers / (Australia) John-Patrick Smith (champions)
3. (United States) Evan King / (United States) Reese Stalder (semifinals)
4. (India) Anirudh Chandrasekar / (India) Niki Kaliyanda Poonacha (first round)

== Draw ==
Key

- Q = Qualifier
- WC = Wild card
- LL = Lucky loser
- Alt = Alternate
- ITF = ITF entry
- PR = Protected ranking
- SR = Special ranking
- SE = Special exempt
- JE = Junior exempt
- JR = Junior Accelerator Programme entrant
- CO = College Accelerator Programme entrant
- NG = Next Gen Accelerator Program entrant
- w/o = Walkover
- r = Retired
- d = Defaulted

=== Draw ===
First round
1	(Uruguay) A Behar (United Kingdom) L Johnson	7^{7}	6
(Croatia) D Ajduković (Serbia) H Medjedovic	6^{3}	2
WC	(United States) C Williams (United States) T Winegar	3	4
(Australia) P Harper (Canada) B Sigouin	6	6
4	(India) A Chandrasekar (India) N Kaliyanda Poonacha	6	6^{9}	[8]
(Argentina) FA Gómez (Greece) Pe Tsitsipas	4	7^{11}	[10]
(India) J Nedunchezhiyan (India) VS Prashanth	6	6
(France) B Bonzi (France) H Mayot	4	2
(Belgium) D Goffin (France) A Müller	2	5
(Australia) K Pearson (United States) J Sheehy	6	7
(Italy) M Gigante (Italy) F Passaro	3	3
3	(United States) E King (United States) R Stalder	6	6
(United States) M Kiger (Australia) C Puttergill	1	6	[10]
WC	Martin Borisiouk (United States) B Shick	6	4	[6]
(United States) G Goldhoff (United States) V Kirkov	5	3
2	(Australia) J Peers (Australia) J-P Smith	7	6

Quarterfinals
1	(Uruguay) A Behar (United Kingdom) L Johnson	3	6	[10]
(Australia) P Harper (Canada) B Sigouin	6	3	[6]
(Argentina) FA Gómez (Greece) Pe Tsitsipas	4	6	[10]
(India) J Nedunchezhiyan (India) VS Prashanth	6	3	[3]
(Australia) K Pearson (United States) J Sheehy	3	6	[4]
3	(United States) E King (United States) R Stalder	6	1	[10]
(United States) M Kiger (Australia) C Puttergill	6^{4}	3
2	(Australia) J Peers (Australia) J-P Smith	7^{7}	6

Semifinals
1	(Uruguay) A Behar (United Kingdom) L Johnson	1	7^{9}	[6]
(Argentina) FA Gómez (Greece) Pe Tsitsipas	6	6^{7}	[10]
3	(United States) E King (United States) R Stalder	6^{4}	4
2	(Australia) J Peers (Australia) J-P Smith	7^{7}	6

Final
(Argentina) FA Gómez (Greece) Pe Tsitsipas
2	(Australia) J Peers (Australia) J-P Smith	w/o
