= 2023 Challenger Banque Nationale de Drummondville – Doubles =

Doubles
- 2023 Challenger Banque Nationale de Drummondville

Final
- Champions: (Sweden) André Göransson (United Kingdom) Toby Samuel
- Runners-up: (Canada) Liam Draxl (United Kingdom) Giles Hussey
- Score: 6–7^{(2–7)}, 6–3, [10–8]

Events
Singles	Doubles
- Challenger Banque Nationale de Drummondville

Julian Cash and Henry Patten were the defending champions but chose not to defend their title.

André Göransson and Toby Samuel won the title after defeating Liam Draxl and Giles Hussey 6–7^{(2–7)}, 6–3, [10–8] in the final.

== Seeds ==
1. (Poland) Piotr Matuszewski / (Germany) Kai Wehnelt (quarterfinals)
2. (Sweden) André Göransson / (United Kingdom) Toby Samuel (champions)
3. (Czech Republic) Andrew Paulson / (Czech Republic) Michael Vrbenský (semifinals)
4. (United Kingdom) Charles Broom / (United Kingdom) Ben Jones (first round)

== Draw ==
Key

- Q = Qualifier
- WC = Wild card
- LL = Lucky loser
- Alt = Alternate
- ITF = ITF entry
- PR = Protected ranking
- SR = Special ranking
- SE = Special exempt
- JE = Junior exempt
- JR = Junior Accelerator Programme entrant
- CO = College Accelerator Programme entrant
- NG = Next Gen Accelerator Program entrant
- w/o = Walkover
- r = Retired
- d = Defaulted

First round
1	(Poland) P Matuszewski (Germany) K Wehnelt	6	7^{7}
WC	(Canada) Sid Donarski (Canada) Eloi Roux	4	6^{4}
(Australia) L Saville (Australia) L Tu	6^{2}	4
(United States) T-S Kwiatkowski (United States) A Lawson	7^{7}	6
4	(United Kingdom) C Broom (United Kingdom) B Jones	3	5
(Canada) L Draxl (United Kingdom) G Hussey	6	7
(United Kingdom) S Duncan (Canada) K Stevenson	4	6	[10]
(United States) M Kiger (Canada) B Sigouin	6	3	[8]
(Spain) D Jordà Sanchis (Germany) Luca Wiedenmann	6	6
(United States) Jack Vance (United States) Jamie Vance	3	1
(Canada) JC Aguilar (United States) T Hilderbrand	7^{8}	6^{6}	[8]
3	(Czech Republic) A Paulson (Czech Republic) M Vrbenský	6^{6}	7^{8}	[10]
(Canada) S Diez (Poland) M Kaśnikowski	2	4
(Tunisia) A Dougaz (Zimbabwe) B Lock	6	6
WC	(Canada) D Martin (Canada) Nicaise Muamba	4	1
2	(Sweden) A Göransson (United Kingdom) T Samuel	6	6

Quarterfinals
1	(Poland) P Matuszewski (Germany) K Wehnelt	4	1
(United States) T-S Kwiatkowski (United States) A Lawson	6	6
(Canada) L Draxl (United Kingdom) G Hussey	6	6
(United Kingdom) S Duncan (Canada) K Stevenson	4	1
(Spain) D Jordà Sanchis (Germany) L Wiedenmann	4	6^{4}
3	(Czech Republic) A Paulson (Czech Republic) M Vrbenský	6	7^{7}
(Tunisia) A Dougaz (Zimbabwe) B Lock	3	2
2	(Sweden) A Göransson (United Kingdom) T Samuel	6	6

Semifinals
(United States) T-S Kwiatkowski (United States) A Lawson	6^{3}	6	[8]
(Canada) L Draxl (United Kingdom) G Hussey	7^{7}	3	[10]
3	(Czech Republic) A Paulson (Czech Republic) M Vrbenský	3	2
2	(Sweden) A Göransson (United Kingdom) T Samuel	6	6

Final
(Canada) L Draxl (United Kingdom) G Hussey	7^{7}	3	[8]
2	(Sweden) A Göransson (United Kingdom) T Samuel	6^{2}	6	[10]
