= 2024 Challenger Banque Nationale de Drummondville – Singles =

Singles
- 2024 Challenger Banque Nationale de Drummondville

Final
- Champion: (United States) Aidan Mayo
- Runner-up: (Luxembourg) Chris Rodesch
- Score: 6–3, 3–6, 6–4

Events
Singles	Doubles
- Challenger Banque Nationale de Drummondville

Zizou Bergs was the defending champion but chose not to defend his title.

Aidan Mayo won the title after defeating Chris Rodesch 6–3, 3–6, 6–4 in the final.

== Seeds ==
1. (Australia) James Duckworth (first round)
2. (United States) Aleksandar Kovacevic (first round, retired)
3. (Argentina) Juan Pablo Ficovich (first round)
4. (Japan) James Trotter (semifinals)
5. (Argentina) Facundo Mena (second round, withdrew)
6. (United States) Brandon Holt (second round)
7. (Tunisia) Aziz Dougaz (second round, retired)
8. (Australia) Bernard Tomic (second round, retired)

== Draw ==
Key

- Q = Qualifier
- WC = Wild card
- LL = Lucky loser
- Alt = Alternate
- ITF = ITF entry
- PR = Protected ranking
- SR = Special ranking
- SE = Special exempt
- JE = Junior exempt
- JR = Junior Accelerator Programme entrant
- CO = College Accelerator Programme entrant
- NG = Next Gen Accelerator Program entrant
- w/o = Walkover
- r = Retired
- d = Defaulted

=== Finals ===
Semifinals
(Luxembourg) Chris Rodesch	6	6
4	(Japan) James Trotter	4	3
Q	(Germany) Patrick Zahraj	6	1	3
(United States) Aidan Mayo	3	6	6

Final
(Luxembourg) Chris Rodesch	3	6	4
(United States) Aidan Mayo	6	3	6

=== Top half ===
First round
1	(Australia) J Duckworth	6^{5}	6	1
(Luxembourg) C Rodesch	7^{7}	2	6
Q	(United Kingdom) B Jones	6	3	5
(Slovenia) B Artnak	4	6	7
(United Kingdom) C Broom	3	5
Q	(France) A Ghibaudo	6	7
Q	(France) Robin Catry	3	6	3
8	(Australia) B Tomic	6	3	6
4	(Japan) J Trotter	6	7^{7}
WC	(Canada) Jaden Weekes	3	6^{4}
(Canada) L Draxl	6^{4}	6	6^{1}
(Belgium) M Geerts	7^{7}	2	7^{7}
Q	(Canada) JC Aguilar	4	6	1
(Brazil) K Sell	6	4	6
(United States) R Seggerman	4	1
6	(United States) B Holt	6	6

Second round
(Luxembourg) C Rodesch	6	6
(Slovenia) B Artnak	1	1
Q	(France) A Ghibaudo	6	0
8	(Australia) B Tomic	2	0^{r}
4	(Japan) J Trotter	5
(Belgium) M Geerts	2^{r}
(Brazil) K Sell	7	7^{7}
6	(United States) B Holt	5	6^{5}

Quarterfinals
(Luxembourg) C Rodesch	6	6
Q	(France) A Ghibaudo	3	1
4	(Japan) J Trotter	6^{5}	6	7
(Brazil) K Sell	7^{7}	3	5

Semifinals
(Luxembourg) C Rodesch	6	6
4	(Japan) J Trotter	4	3

=== Bottom half ===
First round
7	(Tunisia) A Dougaz	6	6
(Colombia) N Mejía	4	4
(United States) Andre Ilagan	3	2
Q	(Germany) P Zahraj	6	6
Q	(United States) A Perez	6	0	6
(Portugal) D Vale	2	6	2
(Germany) D Masur	6	6
3	(Argentina) JP Ficovich	4	4
5	(Argentina) F Mena	6^{4}	6	6
WC	(Canada) V Pospisil	7^{7}	1	4
WC	(Canada) N Arseneault	2	4
(Austria) J Schwärzler	6	6
(Canada) A Galarneau	6	2	7^{7}
PR	(United Kingdom) A Gray	2	6	6^{4}
(United States) A Mayo	2	7^{7}	2
2	(United States) A Kovacevic	6	6^{3}	1^{r}

Second round
7	(Tunisia) A Dougaz	3	2^{r}
Q	(Germany) P Zahraj	6	4
Q	(United States) A Perez	4	5
(Germany) D Masur	6	7
5	(Argentina) F Mena
(Austria) J Schwärzler	w/o
(Canada) A Galarneau	2	6	4
(United States) A Mayo	6	1	6

Quarterfinals
Q	(Germany) P Zahraj	6	6^{4}	6
(Germany) D Masur	4	7^{7}	3
(Austria) J Schwärzler	3	4
(United States) A Mayo	6	6

Semifinals
Q	(Germany) P Zahraj	6	1	3
(United States) A Mayo	3	6	6
