= 2024 Puerto Vallarta Open – Singles =

Singles
- 2024 Puerto Vallarta Open

Final
- Champion: (United States) Nishesh Basavareddy
- Runner-up: (Canada) Liam Draxl
- Score: 6–3, 7–6^{(7–4)}

Events
| Singles | Doubles |
| ← 2023 · | Puerto Vallarta Open | · 2025 → |

Benoît Paire was the defending champion but chose not to defend his title.

Nishesh Basavareddy won the title after defeating Liam Draxl 6–3, 7–6^{(7–4)} in the final.

== Seeds ==
1. (United States) Nishesh Basavareddy (champion)
2. (Tunisia) Aziz Dougaz (first round)
3. (United States) Eliot Spizzirri (withdrew)
4. (Brazil) Karue Sell (withdrew)
5. (Belgium) Michael Geerts (withdrew)
6. (Canada) Liam Draxl (final)
7. (United States) Andre Ilagan (quarterfinals)
8. (Argentina) Valerio Aboian (first round)
9. (Bulgaria) Dimitar Kuzmanov (semifinals)
10. (Luxembourg) Chris Rodesch (second round)

== Draw ==
=== Key ===
- Q = Qualifier
- WC = Wild card
- LL = Lucky loser
- Alt = Alternate
- ITF = ITF entry
- PR = Protected ranking
- SR = Special ranking
- SE = Special exempt
- JE = Junior exempt
- JR = Junior Accelerator Programme entrant
- CO = College Accelerator Programme entrant
- NG = Next Gen Accelerator Program entrant
- w/o = Walkover
- r = Retired
- d = Defaulted

=== Finals ===
Semifinals
1 | (United States) Nishesh Basavareddy | 6 | 6
WC | (Mexico) Luis Carlos Álvarez | 3 | 2
9 | (Bulgaria) Dimitar Kuzmanov | 4 | 4
6 | (Canada) Liam Draxl | 6 | 6

Final
1 | (United States) Nishesh Basavareddy | 6 | 7^{7}
6 | (Canada) Liam Draxl | 3 | 6^{4}

=== Top half ===
First round
1 | (United States) N Basavareddy | 6 | 6
Q | (Venezuela) G Oliveira | 1 | 4
(United Kingdom) G Hussey | 6 | 6^{4} | 6
(Austria) N Oberleitner | 2 | 7^{7} | 0
(Slovenia) B Artnak | 4 | 6^{4}
Q | (Mexico) A Magadán | 6 | 7^{7}
(United States) R Seggerman | 1 | 2
7 | (United States) Andre Ilagan | 6 | 6
10 | (Luxembourg) C Rodesch | 6 | 3 | 6
(New Zealand) K Pannu | 3 | 6 | 3
Alt | (Germany) M Rosenkranz | 6 | 3 | 7
Q | (Germany) Elmar Ejupovic | 3 | 6 | 5
(Mexico) R Pacheco Méndez | 7^{7} | 4 | 6
Alt | (Mexico) E Escobedo | 6^{4} | 6 | 2
WC | (Mexico) LC Álvarez | 7 | 6
8 | (Argentina) V Aboian | 5 | 1

Second round
1 | (United States) N Basavareddy | 7 | 0 | 6
(United Kingdom) G Hussey | 5 | 6 | 1
Q | (Mexico) A Magadán | 0 | 4
7 | (United States) A Ilagan | 6 | 6
10 | (Luxembourg) C Rodesch | 1 | 6 | 6^{6}
Alt | (Germany) M Rosenkranz | 6 | 2 | 7^{8}
(Mexico) R Pacheco Méndez | 6 | 3 | 3
WC | (Mexico) LC Álvarez | 4 | 6 | 6

Quarterfinals
1 | (United States) N Basavareddy | 7^{7} | 6
7 | (United States) A Ilagan | 6^{4} | 0
Alt | (Germany) M Rosenkranz | 2 | 3
WC | (Mexico) LC Álvarez | 6 | 6

Semifinals
1 | (United States) N Basavareddy | 6 | 6
WC | (Mexico) LC Álvarez | 3 | 2

=== Bottom half ===
First round
LL | (United States) S Kirchheimer | 6 | 3 | 6
(United Kingdom) H Searle | 3 | 6 | 2
WC | (Mexico) Santiago Ledesma | 2 | 1
Q | (United Kingdom) Patrick Brady | 6 | 6
Q | (United States) A Perez | 6 | 3 | 6
(Germany) J Engel | 3 | 6 | 4
Alt | (United States) Felix Corwin | 1 | 3
9 | (Bulgaria) D Kuzmanov | 6 | 6
6 | (Canada) L Draxl | 6 | 6
E Karlovskiy | 0 | 0
(Georgia (country)) S Purtseladze | 2 | 5
WC | (Mexico) A Hernández | 6 | 7
Alt | (United States) K Smith | 6 | 6
Q | (Costa Rica) Rodrigo Crespo Piedra | 3 | 4
(United States) A Mayo | 3 | 7^{8} | 6
2 | (Tunisia) A Dougaz | 6 | 6^{6} | 1

Second round
LL | (United States) S Kirchheimer | 6 | 1 | 5
Q | (United Kingdom) P Brady | 4 | 6 | 7
Q | (United States) A Perez | 5 | 2
9 | (Bulgaria) D Kuzmanov | 7 | 6
6 | (Canada) L Draxl | 6 | 6
WC | (Mexico) A Hernández | 0 | 0
Alt | (United States) K Smith | 3 | 5
(United States) A Mayo | 6 | 7

Quarterfinals
Q | (United Kingdom) P Brady | 1 | 2
9 | (Bulgaria) D Kuzmanov | 6 | 6
6 | (Canada) L Draxl | 6 | 6
(United States) A Mayo | 2 | 4

Semifinals
9 | (Bulgaria) D Kuzmanov | 4 | 4
6 | (Canada) L Draxl | 6 | 6
