= 2024 Puerto Vallarta Open – Doubles =

Doubles
- 2024 Puerto Vallarta Open

Final
- Champions: (Canada) Liam Draxl (Canada) Benjamin Sigouin
- Runners-up: (United States) Karl Poling (United States) Ryan Seggerman
- Score: 7–6^{(7–5)}, 6–2

Events
Singles	Doubles
- Puerto Vallarta Open

Robert Galloway and Miguel Ángel Reyes-Varela were the defending champions but chose not to defend their title.

Liam Draxl and Benjamin Sigouin won the title after defeating Karl Poling and Ryan Seggerman 7–6^{(7–5)}, 6–2 in the final.

== Seeds ==
1. (Canada) Liam Draxl / (Canada) Benjamin Sigouin (champions)
2. (Israel) Roy Stepanov / (United States) Tennyson Whiting (first round)
3. (Zimbabwe) Courtney John Lock / (Venezuela) Gonzalo Oliveira (quarterfinals)
4. (New Zealand) Finn Reynolds / (United States) Keegan Smith (semifinals)

== Draw ==
Key

- Q = Qualifier
- WC = Wild card
- LL = Lucky loser
- Alt = Alternate
- ITF = ITF entry
- PR = Protected ranking
- SR = Special ranking
- SE = Special exempt
- JE = Junior exempt
- JR = Junior Accelerator Programme entrant
- CO = College Accelerator Programme entrant
- NG = Next Gen Accelerator Program entrant
- w/o = Walkover
- r = Retired
- d = Defaulted

=== Draw ===
First round
1	(Canada) L Draxl (Canada) B Sigouin	6	7
(United States) Andre Ilagan (Antigua and Barbuda) J Maginley	2	5
E Karlovskiy (Germany) M Rosenkranz	4	4
(United States) P Kumar (United States) N Schachter	6	6
3	(Zimbabwe) CJ Lock (Venezuela) G Oliveira	6	6
WC	(Mexico) A Hernández (Mexico) R Pacheco Méndez	4	4
WC	(Mexico) A Magadán (Mexico) Daniel Moreno	4	4
(United States) Felix Corwin (Austria) N Oberleitner	6	6
Alt	(United States) A Perez (United States) Jamie Vance	5	4
(Slovenia) B Artnak (United States) Maxwell McKennon	7	6
(United Kingdom) James Davis (United Kingdom) J MacKinlay	5	6	[10]
4	(New Zealand) F Reynolds (United States) K Smith	7	4	[12]
(United States) K Poling (United States) R Seggerman	6	6
(Argentina) V Aboian (United States) W Woodall	3	2
(United Kingdom) G Hussey (United Kingdom) Oliver Okonkwo	7^{7}	7^{7}
2	(Israel) R Stepanov (United States) Tennyson Whiting	6^{4}	6^{4}

Quarterfinals
1	(Canada) L Draxl (Canada) B Sigouin	7	6^{3}	[10]
(United States) P Kumar (United States) N Schachter	5	7^{7}	[8]
3	(Zimbabwe) CJ Lock (Venezuela) G Oliveira	4	2
(United States) F Corwin (Austria) N Oberleitner	6	6
(Slovenia) B Artnak (United States) M McKennon	5	2
4	(New Zealand) F Reynolds (United States) K Smith	7	6
(United States) K Poling (United States) R Seggerman	6	6^{3}	[10]
(United Kingdom) G Hussey (United Kingdom) O Okonkwo	3	7^{7}	[4]

Semifinals
1	(Canada) L Draxl (Canada) B Sigouin	6	7
(United States) F Corwin (Austria) N Oberleitner	3	5
4	(New Zealand) F Reynolds (United States) K Smith	3	3
(United States) K Poling (United States) R Seggerman	6	6

Final
1	(Canada) L Draxl (Canada) B Sigouin	7^{7}	6
(United States) K Poling (United States) R Seggerman	6^{5}	2
