= 2025 Cary Tennis Classic – Women's doubles =

Women's doubles
- 2025 Cary Tennis Classic

Final
- Champions: (United States) Ayana Akli (United States) Abigail Rencheli
- Runners-up: (South Africa) Gabriella Broadfoot (United States) Maddy Zampardo
- Score: 6-3, 6-2

Events
Singles	men	women
Doubles	men	women
- Cary Tennis Classic

Céline Naef and Tamara Zidanšek were the defending champions, but chose not to participate.

Ayana Akli and Abigail Rencheli won the title, defeating Gabriella Broadfoot and Maddy Zampardo in straight sets, 6–3, 6–2.

== Seeds ==
1. (Canada) Ariana Arseneault / (Canada) Mia Kupres (semifinals)
2. (United States) Makenna Jones / (United States) Anna Rogers (first round)
3. (Netherlands) Arianne Hartono / (India) Prarthana Thombare (first round)
4. (United States) Carmen Corley / (United States) Ivana Corley (first round)

== Draw ==
Key

- Q = Qualifier
- WC = Wild card
- LL = Lucky loser
- Alt = Alternate
- ITF = ITF entry
- PR = Protected ranking
- SR = Special ranking
- SE = Special exempt
- JE = Junior exempt
- JR = Junior Accelerator Programme entrant
- CO = College Accelerator Programme entrant
- NG = Next Gen Accelerator Program entrant
- w/o = Walkover
- r = Retired
- d = Defaulted

=== Draw ===
First round
1	(Canada) Ariana Arseneault (Canada) Mia Kupres	7	6
(United States) Catherine Harrison (United States) Christina Rosca	5	2
(Japan) Himeno Sakatsume (Japan) Wakana Sonobe	7	3	[8]
(Canada) Kayla Cross (United States) Maribella Zamarripa	5	6	[10]
4	(United States) Carmen Corley (United States) Ivana Corley	6	4	[4]
(South Africa) Gabriella Broadfoot (United States) Maddy Zampardo	1	6	[10]
(United States) Maria Mateas (United States) Alana Smith	6	3	[9]
(Australia) Destanee Aiava (Georgia (country)) Mariam Bolkvadze	0	6	[11]
(Australia) Petra Hule (Czech Republic) Darja Vidmanova	6	7^{7}
(United States) Hanna Chang (Serbia) Katarina Jokic	2	6^{2}
(United States) Ayana Akli (United States) Abigail Rencheli	6	6
3	(Netherlands) Arianne Hartono (India) Prarthana Thombare	4	3
(United States) Haley Giavara (Australia) Alexandra Osborne	6	6
(Canada) Cadence Brace (United States) Elvina Kalieva	3	3
(United States) Reese Brantmeier (United States) Alanis Hamilton	6	6
2	(United States) Makenna Jones (United States) Anna Rogers	2	3

Quarterfinals
1	(Canada) Ariana Arseneault (Canada) Mia Kupres	5	6	[10]
(Canada) Kayla Cross (United States) Maribella Zamarripa	7	1	[4]
(South Africa) Gabriella Broadfoot (United States) Maddy Zampardo	1
(Australia) Destanee Aiava (Georgia (country)) Mariam Bolkvadze	4^{r}
(Australia) Petra Hule (Czech Republic) Darja Vidmanova	6	1	[4]
(United States) Ayana Akli (United States) Abigail Rencheli	2	6	[10]
(United States) Haley Giavara (Australia) Alexandra Osborne	4	0
(United States) Reese Brantmeier (United States) Alanis Hamilton	6	6

Semifinals
1	(Canada) Ariana Arseneault (Canada) Mia Kupres	6^{5}	6	[5]
(South Africa) Gabriella Broadfoot (United States) Maddy Zampardo	7^{7}	3	[10]
(United States) Ayana Akli (United States) Abigail Rencheli	4	6	[10]
(United States) Reese Brantmeier (United States) Alanis Hamilton	6	3	[5]

Final
(South Africa) Gabriella Broadfoot (United States) Maddy Zampardo	3	2
(United States) Ayana Akli (United States) Abigail Rencheli	6	6
