= 2025 Tallahassee Tennis Challenger =

- Date: 14–20 April
- Edition: 25th
- Surface: Green clay
- Location: Tallahassee, Florida, United States

Champions

Singles
- (Luxembourg) Chris Rodesch

Doubles
- (Canada) Liam Draxl / (Canada) Cleeve Harper
- Tallahassee Tennis Challenger

The 2025 Tallahassee Tennis Challenger was a professional tennis tournament played on green clay courts. It was the 25th edition of the tournament which was part of the 2025 ATP Challenger Tour. It took place in Tallahassee, Florida, United States between April 14 and April 20, 2025.

== Singles main-draw entrants ==
=== Seeds ===
Country	Player	Rank^{1}	Seed
USA	Eliot Spizzirri	127	1
CHI	Tomás Barrios Vera	128	2
USA	Mitchell Krueger	137	3
ARG	Federico Agustín Gómez	140	4
KAZ	Dmitry Popko	159	5
USA	Emilio Nava	169	6
USA	Jenson Brooksby	172	7
CAN	Liam Draxl	176	8

- ^{1} Rankings as of April 7, 2025.

=== Other entrants ===
The following players received wildcards into the singles main draw:

- (United States) Jenson Brooksby
- (United States) Mitchell Krueger
- (United States) Patrick Maloney

The following players received entry from the qualifying draw:

- (Brazil) Daniel Dutra da Silva
- (Spain) Iñaki Montes de la Torre
- (United States) Karl Poling
- (Bolivia) Juan Carlos Prado Ángelo
- (Brazil) João Lucas Reis da Silva
- (Denmark) Christian Sigsgaard

== Champions ==
=== Singles ===
- (Luxembourg) Chris Rodesch def. (United States) Emilio Nava 4–6, 6–3, 6–4.

=== Doubles ===
- (Canada) Liam Draxl / (Canada) Cleeve Harper def. (United States) James Cerretani / (United States) George Goldhoff 6–2, 6–3.
