= 2025 Tallahassee Tennis Challenger – Doubles =

Doubles
- 2025 Tallahassee Tennis Challenger

Final
- Champions: (Canada) Liam Draxl (Canada) Cleeve Harper
- Runners-up: (United States) James Cerretani (United States) George Goldhoff
- Score: 6–2, 6–3

Events
Singles	Doubles
← 2024 ·	Tallahassee Tennis Challenger	· 2026 →

Simon Freund and Johannes Ingildsen were the defending champions but only Ingildsen chose to defend his title, partnering David Stevenson. They lost in the semifinals to Liam Draxl and Cleeve Harper.

Draxl and Harper won the title after defeating James Cerretani and George Goldhoff 6–2, 6–3 in the final.

== Seeds ==
1. (Mexico) Hans Hach Verdugo / (United States) Austin Krajicek (quarterfinals)
2. (Canada) Liam Draxl / (Canada) Cleeve Harper (champions)
3. (Denmark) Johannes Ingildsen / (United Kingdom) David Stevenson (semifinals)
4. (Argentina) Federico Agustín Gómez / (Venezuela) Luis David Martínez (first round)

== Draw ==
=== Key ===
- Q = Qualifier
- WC = Wild card
- LL = Lucky loser
- Alt = Alternate
- SE = Special exempt
- PR = Protected ranking
- ITF = ITF entry
- JE = Junior exempt
- w/o = Walkover
- r = Retired
- d = Defaulted
- SR = Special ranking

=== Draw ===
First round
1	(Mexico) H Hach Verdugo (United States) A Krajicek	6	6
(France) S Gueymard Wayenburg (France) M Martineau	2	1
WC	(United States) M Kiger (United States) T Zink	7	6
(Argentina) A Collarini (Kazakhstan) D Popko	5	3
4	(Argentina) FA Gómez (Venezuela) LD Martínez	6	3	[8]
PR	(United States) J Cerretani (United States) G Goldhoff	1	6	[10]
(Brazil) D Dutra da Silva (Zimbabwe) CJ Lock	2	7^{7}	[7]
(Philippines) FC Alcantara (Thailand) P Isaro	6	6^{4}	[10]
(Luxembourg) C Rodesch (Chinese Taipei) T-l Wu	6	4	[10]
(France) G Blancaneaux (France) Mathys Erhard	3	6	[3]
(Australia) J Charlton (Australia) P Harper	6^{3}	4
3	(Denmark) J Ingildsen (United Kingdom) D Stevenson	7^{7}	6
(Bolivia) JC Prado Ángelo (Paraguay) AD Vallejo	6	7
WC	(United States) G Nanda (United States) Jamie Vance	2	5
(Ecuador) A Andrade (France) C Denolly	6^{2}	0
2	(Canada) L Draxl (Canada) C Harper	7^{7}	6

Quarterfinals
1	(Mexico) H Hach Verdugo (United States) A Krajicek	0	6^{5}
WC	(United States) M Kiger (United States) T Zink	6	7^{7}
PR	(United States) J Cerretani (United States) G Goldhoff	7^{7}	6
(Philippines) FC Alcantara (Thailand) P Isaro	6^{4}	2
(Luxembourg) C Rodesch (Chinese Taipei) T-l Wu	6	4	[4]
3	(Denmark) J Ingildsen (United Kingdom) D Stevenson	3	6	[10]
(Bolivia) JC Prado Ángelo (Paraguay) AD Vallejo	3	5
2	(Canada) L Draxl (Canada) C Harper	6	7

Semifinals
WC	(United States) M Kiger (United States) T Zink	2	4
PR	(United States) J Cerretani (United States) G Goldhoff	6	6
3	(Denmark) J Ingildsen (United Kingdom) D Stevenson	3	6	[10]
2	(Canada) L Draxl (Canada) C Harper	6	3	[12]

Final
PR	(United States) J Cerretani (United States) G Goldhoff	2	3
2	(Canada) L Draxl (Canada) C Harper	6	6
