= 2024 Challenger Banque Nationale de Drummondville – Doubles =

Doubles
- 2024 Challenger Banque Nationale de Drummondville

Final
- Champions: (United States) Robert Cash (United States) JJ Tracy
- Runners-up: (Canada) Liam Draxl (Canada) Cleeve Harper
- Score: 6–2, 6–4

Events
Singles	Doubles
- Challenger Banque Nationale de Drummondville

André Göransson and Toby Samuel were the defending champions but chose not to defend their title.

Robert Cash and JJ Tracy won the title after defeating Liam Draxl and Cleeve Harper 6–2, 6–4 in the final.

== Seeds ==
1. (United States) Ryan Seggerman / (United States) Patrik Trhac (first round)
2. (United States) Robert Cash / (United States) JJ Tracy (champions)
3. (Canada) Liam Draxl / (Canada) Cleeve Harper (final)
4. (United Kingdom) Charles Broom / (United Kingdom) Ben Jones (semifinals)

== Draw ==
Key

- Q = Qualifier
- WC = Wild card
- LL = Lucky loser
- Alt = Alternate
- ITF = ITF entry
- PR = Protected ranking
- SR = Special ranking
- SE = Special exempt
- JE = Junior exempt
- JR = Junior Accelerator Programme entrant
- CO = College Accelerator Programme entrant
- NG = Next Gen Accelerator Program entrant
- w/o = Walkover
- r = Retired
- d = Defaulted

=== Draw ===
First round
1	(United States) R Seggerman (United States) P Trhac	3	4
WC	(Canada) Benjamin Thomas George (Canada) Alvin Nicholas Tudorica	6	6
(United States) A Perez (United States) Jamie Vance	6^{5}	4
(Canada) JC Aguilar (Canada) J Boulais	7^{7}	6
3	(Canada) L Draxl (Canada) C Harper	6	6
(Germany) T Rühl (Germany) P Zahraj	2	4
(Colombia) N Mejía (Portugal) D Vale	6	0	[10]
WC	(Canada) Mikael Arseneault (Canada) N Arseneault	2	6	[8]
Alt	(Japan) Kosuke Ogura (Japan) Leo Vithoontien	6	7
(Czech Republic) F Duda (Czech Republic) D Poljak	4	5
(Belgium) M Geerts (Antigua and Barbuda) J Maginley	4	2
4	(United Kingdom) C Broom (United Kingdom) B Jones	6	6
(United States) P Kumar (United States) N Schachter	3	4
(Zimbabwe) B Lock (Zimbabwe) CJ Lock	6	6
(United States) Andre Ilagan (Germany) M Wiskandt	6^{1}	2
2	(United States) R Cash (United States) JJ Tracy	7^{7}	6

Quarterfinals
WC	(Canada) BT George (Canada) AN Tudorica	2	3
(Canada) JC Aguilar (Canada) J Boulais	6	6
3	(Canada) L Draxl (Canada) C Harper	7	6^{4}	[10]
(Colombia) N Mejía (Portugal) D Vale	5	7^{7}	[8]
Alt	(Japan) K Ogura (Japan) L Vithoontien	3	4
4	(United Kingdom) C Broom (United Kingdom) B Jones	6	6
(Zimbabwe) B Lock (Zimbabwe) CJ Lock	2	3
2	(United States) R Cash (United States) JJ Tracy	6	6

Semifinals
(Canada) JC Aguilar (Canada) J Boulais	6	3	[5]
3	(Canada) L Draxl (Canada) C Harper	4	6	[10]
4	(United Kingdom) C Broom (United Kingdom) B Jones	4	2
2	(United States) R Cash (United States) JJ Tracy	6	6

Final
3	(Canada) L Draxl (Canada) C Harper	2	4
2	(United States) R Cash (United States) JJ Tracy	6	6
