= 2025 Oeiras Indoors – Singles =

Singles
- 2025 Oeiras Indoors

Final
- Champion: (Serbia) Hamad Medjedovic
- Runner-up: (Canada) Liam Draxl
- Score: 6–1, 6–3

Events
| Singles | Doubles |
- Oeiras Indoors

Leandro Riedi was the defending champion but chose not to defend his title.

Hamad Medjedovic won the title after defeating Liam Draxl 6–1, 6–3 in the final.

== Seeds ==
1. (Serbia) Hamad Medjedovic (champion)
2. (Switzerland) Alexander Ritschard (quarterfinals)
3. (Kazakhstan) Beibit Zhukayev (first round)
4. (Kazakhstan) Denis Yevseyev (first round)
5. (Canada) Liam Draxl (final)
6. (Chile) Matías Soto (first round)
7. (Hungary) Zsombor Piros (quarterfinals)
8. (Spain) Pol Martín Tiffon (first round)

== Draw ==
Key

- Q = Qualifier
- WC = Wild card
- LL = Lucky loser
- Alt = Alternate
- ITF = ITF entry
- PR = Protected ranking
- SR = Special ranking
- SE = Special exempt
- JE = Junior exempt
- JR = Junior Accelerator Programme entrant
- CO = College Accelerator Programme entrant
- NG = Next Gen Accelerator Program entrant
- w/o = Walkover
- r = Retired
- d = Defaulted

=== Finals ===
Semifinals
1 | (Serbia) Hamad Medjedovic | 6^{2} | 6 | 7
(Spain) Daniel Rincón | 7^{7} | 4 | 5
(Germany) Rudolf Molleker | 6^{6} | 0
5 | (Canada) Liam Draxl | 7^{8} | 6

Final
1 | (Serbia) Hamad Medjedovic | 6 | 6
5 | (Canada) Liam Draxl | 1 | 3

=== Top half ===
First round
1 | (Serbia) H Medjedovic | 1 | 7^{7} | 6
Q | E Gerasimov | 6 | 6^{4} | 4
WC | (Portugal) F Ferreira Silva | 6^{6} | 6 | 6
Q | (United States) T Hilderbrand | 7^{8} | 2 | 4
(Spain) D Mérida | 6 | 4 | 6^{5}
WC | (Portugal) D Vale | 2 | 6 | 7^{7}
Q | (Lithuania) R Berankis | 3 | 5
7 | (Hungary) Z Piros | 6 | 7
3 | (Kazakhstan) B Zhukayev | 6 | 2 | 3
(United States) Micah Braswell | 1 | 6 | 6
(Portugal) G Elias | 3 | 3
(Spain) D Rincón | 6 | 6
WC | (Portugal) Pedro Araújo | 4 | 6 | 2
Q | I Gakhov | 6 | 3 | 6
(Germany) MH Rehberg | 6 | 6
6 | (Chile) M Soto | 4 | 3

Second round
1 | (Serbia) H Medjedovic | 6 | 2
WC | (Portugal) F Ferreira Silva | 1 | 1^{r}
WC | (Portugal) D Vale | 1 | 3
7 | (Hungary) Z Piros | 6 | 6
(United States) M Braswell | 2 | 7^{7} | 5
(Spain) D Rincón | 6 | 6^{5} | 7
Q | I Gakhov | 5 | 3
(Germany) MH Rehberg | 7 | 6

Quarterfinals
1 | (Serbia) H Medjedovic | 6 | 6
7 | (Hungary) Z Piros | 3 | 3
(Spain) D Rincón | 3 | 6 | 6
(Germany) MH Rehberg | 6 | 4 | 2

Semifinals
1 | (Serbia) H Medjedovic | 6^{2} | 6 | 7
(Spain) D Rincón | 7^{7} | 4 | 5

=== Bottom half ===
First round
8 | (Spain) P Martín Tiffon | 6^{3} | 2
(Germany) R Molleker | 7^{7} | 6
(France) R Bertrand | 2 | 3
(Brazil) K Sell | 6 | 6
(Italy) L Giustino | 4 | 1
(Turkey) E Kırkın | 6 | 6
(France) Antoine Cornut-Chauvinc | 6 | 0 | 6
4 | (Kazakhstan) D Yevseyev | 2 | 6 | 3
5 | (Canada) L Draxl | 5 | 6 | 6
(United States) JJ Wolf | 7 | 2 | 4
(Italy) Samuel Vincent Ruggeri | 6 | 6
(Croatia) M Dodig | 1 | 2
Q | A Zakharov | 3 | 4
(Spain) B Zapata Miralles | 6 | 6
Q | (Germany) S Fanselow | 4 | 4
2 | (Switzerland) A Ritschard | 6 | 6

Second round
(Germany) R Molleker | 6 | 6
(Brazil) K Sell | 4 | 4
(Turkey) E Kırkın | 5 | 2
(France) A Cornut-Chauvinc | 7 | 6
5 | (Canada) L Draxl | 3 | 6 | 7^{9}
(Italy) S Vincent Ruggeri | 6 | 1 | 6^{7}
(Spain) B Zapata Miralles | 6^{2} | 4
2 | (Switzerland) A Ritschard | 7^{7} | 6

Quarterfinals
(Germany) R Molleker | 6 | 6
(France) A Cornut-Chauvinc | 3 | 4
5 | (Canada) L Draxl | 6 | 6
2 | (Switzerland) A Ritschard | 4 | 1

Semifinals
(Germany) R Molleker | 6^{6} | 0
5 | (Canada) L Draxl | 7^{8} | 6
