= 2024 Cary Tennis Classic – Men's singles =

Men's singles
- 2024 Cary Tennis Classic

Final
- Champion: Roman Safiullin
- Runner-up: (Italy) Mattia Bellucci
- Score: 1–6, 7–5, 7–5

Events
Singles	men	women
Doubles	men	women
- Cary Tennis Classic

Zachary Svajda was the defending champion but chose not to defend his title.

Roman Safiullin won the title after defeating Mattia Bellucci 1–6, 7–5, 7–5 in the final.

== Seeds ==
1. Roman Safiullin (champion)
2. (France) Alexandre Müller (first round)
3. (Australia) Adam Walton (first round)
4. (Belgium) David Goffin (semifinals)
5. Aslan Karatsev (second round)
6. (United Kingdom) Billy Harris (second round)
7. (France) Luca Van Assche (second round)
8. (France) Harold Mayot (first round)

== Draw ==
Key

- Q = Qualifier
- WC = Wild card
- LL = Lucky loser
- Alt = Alternate
- ITF = ITF entry
- PR = Protected ranking
- SR = Special ranking
- SE = Special exempt
- JE = Junior exempt
- JR = Junior Accelerator Programme entrant
- CO = College Accelerator Programme entrant
- NG = Next Gen Accelerator Program entrant
- w/o = Walkover
- r = Retired
- d = Defaulted

=== Finals ===
Semifinals
1	Roman Safiullin	7^{7}	7^{7}
4	(Belgium) David Goffin	6^{5}	6^{2}
Q	(Italy) Mattia Bellucci	6	6
Q	(Canada) Gabriel Diallo	3	3

Final
1	Roman Safiullin	1	7	7
Q	(Italy) Mattia Bellucci	6	5	5

=== Top half ===
First round
1	R Safiullin	7	2	6
Q	(Italy) M Gigante	5	6	4
(France) T Atmane	6	4	6
(Croatia) D Ajduković	4	6	4
WC	(United States) B Shick	3	4
(United States) C Eubanks	6	6
(Brazil) J Fonseca	2	6	3
6	(United Kingdom) B Harris	6	1	6
4	(Belgium) D Goffin	6	4	6
Alt	(United States) N Moreno de Alboran	4	6	2
(Switzerland) A Ritschard	3	7^{7}	5
(United States) E Quinn	6	6^{2}	7
Q	(France) K Jacquet	4	6	6
Q	(United States) E Nava	6	3	2
(Finland) O Virtanen	6	6
8	(France) H Mayot	3	2

Second round
1	R Safiullin	6	3	6
(France) T Atmane	4	6	4
(United States) C Eubanks	7^{7}	6^{6}	6
6	(United Kingdom) B Harris	6^{5}	7^{8}	2
4	(Belgium) D Goffin	6	6
(United States) E Quinn	4	1
Q	(France) K Jacquet	6	3	2
(Finland) O Virtanen	3	6	6

Quarterfinals
1	R Safiullin	6	6
(United States) C Eubanks	4	4
4	(Belgium) D Goffin	6	7^{7}
(Finland) O Virtanen	4	6^{1}

Semifinals
1	R Safiullin	7^{7}	7^{7}
4	(Belgium) D Goffin	6^{5}	6^{2}

=== Bottom half ===
First round
5	A Karatsev	6	3	6
(Italy) F Passaro	2	6	2
WC	(United States) C Williams	7	4	4
(Kazakhstan) M Kukushkin	5	6	6
Q	(Italy) M Bellucci	6	6
Q	(South Korea) S-c Hong	4	2
SE	(United States) N Basavareddy	6	6
3	(Australia) A Walton	4	4
7	(France) L Van Assche	0	7	6
(France) B Bonzi	6	5	4
SE	(Hong Kong) C Wong	2	6	2
Q	(Canada) G Diallo	6	1	6
Alt	(Serbia) H Medjedovic	7^{7}	0
(Switzerland) L Riedi	6^{5}	0^{r}
WC	(United States) T Boyer	7^{7}	6
2	(France) A Müller	6^{5}	4

Second round
5	A Karatsev	6^{2}	6	1
(Kazakhstan) M Kukushkin	7^{7}	3	6
Q	(Italy) M Bellucci	6	6
SE	(United States) N Basavareddy	2	2
7	(France) L Van Assche	4	3
Q	(Canada) G Diallo	6	6
Alt	(Serbia) H Medjedovic	2	1
WC	(United States) T Boyer	6	6

Quarterfinals
(Kazakhstan) M Kukushkin	1	3
Q	(Italy) M Bellucci	6	6
Q	(Canada) G Diallo	7^{8}	6^{1}	6
WC	(United States) T Boyer	6^{6}	7^{7}	4

Semifinals
Q	(Italy) M Bellucci	6	6
Q	(Canada) G Diallo	3	3
