= 2024 Challenger Banque Nationale de Drummondville =

- Date: November 11 – 17
- Edition: 17th
- Category: ATP Challenger Tour
- Surface: Hard (indoor)
- Location: Drummondville, Canada

Champions

Singles
- (United States) Aidan Mayo

Doubles
- (United States) Robert Cash / (United States) JJ Tracy
- Challenger de Drummondville

The 2024 Challenger Banque Nationale de Drummondville was a professional tennis tournament played on indoor hard courts. It was the 17th edition of the tournament and part of the 2024 ATP Challenger Tour. It took place in Drummondville, Canada between November 11 and 17, 2024.

== Singles main-draw entrants ==
=== Seeds ===
Country	Player	Rank^{1}	Seed
AUS	James Duckworth	77	1
USA	Aleksandar Kovacevic	101	2
ARG	Juan Pablo Ficovich	175	3
JPN	James Trotter	198	4
ARG	Facundo Mena	199	5
USA	Brandon Holt	201	6
TUN	Aziz Dougaz	205	7
AUS	Bernard Tomic	207	8

- ^{1} Rankings are as of November 4, 2024.

=== Other entrants ===
The following players received wildcards into the singles main draw:

- (Canada) Nicolas Arseneault
- (Canada) Vasek Pospisil
- (Canada) Jaden Weekes

The following player received entry into the singles main draw using a protected ranking:

- (United Kingdom) Alastair Gray

The following players received entry from the qualifying draw:

- (Canada) Juan Carlos Aguilar
- (France) Robin Catry
- (France) Antoine Ghibaudo
- (United Kingdom) Ben Jones
- (United States) Alfredo Perez
- (Germany) Patrick Zahraj

== Champions ==
=== Singles ===
- (United States) Aidan Mayo def. (Luxembourg) Chris Rodesch 6–3, 3–6, 6–4.

=== Doubles ===
- (United States) Robert Cash / (United States) JJ Tracy def. (Canada) Liam Draxl / (Canada) Cleeve Harper 6–2, 6–4.
