= 2024 Cary Tennis Classic =

Tennis tournament

- Date: 11–17 August 2024
- Edition: 12th (men); 1st (women)
- Category: ATP Challenger Tour; ITF Women's World Tennis Tour
- Prize money: $133,250 (men) $100,000 (women)
- Surface: Hard / Outdoor
- Location: Cary, United States

Champions

Men's singles
- Roman Safiullin

Women's singles
- (Spain) Nuria Párrizas Díaz

Men's doubles
- (Australia) John Peers / (Australia) John-Patrick Smith

Women's doubles
- (Switzerland) Céline Naef / (Slovenia) Tamara Zidanšek
- Cary Tennis Classic

The 2024 Cary Tennis Classic was a professional tennis tournament played on outdoor hard courts. It was the twelfth edition of the tournament, which was part of the 2024 ATP Challenger Tour, and the first edition of the tournament, which was part of the 2024 ITF Women's World Tennis Tour. It took place in Cary, North Carolina, United States, between August 11 and August 17, 2024.

== Champions ==
=== Men's singles ===
- Roman Safiullin def. (Italy) Mattia Bellucci 1–6, 7–5, 7–5.

=== Women's singles ===
- (Spain) Nuria Párrizas Díaz def. (Mexico) Renata Zarazúa, 6–3, 3–6, 7–6^{(7–2)}

=== Men's doubles ===
- (Australia) John Peers / (Australia) John-Patrick Smith def. (Argentina) Federico Agustín Gómez / (Greece) Petros Tsitsipas by walkover.

=== Women's doubles ===
- (Switzerland) Céline Naef / (Slovenia) Tamara Zidanšek def. (Georgia (country)) Oksana Kalashnikova / Iryna Shymanovich, 4–6, 6–3, [11–9]

== Men's singles main-draw entrants ==
=== Seeds ===
Country	Player	Rank^{1}	Seed
	Roman Safiullin	66	1
FRA	Alexandre Müller	77	2
AUS	Adam Walton	86	3
BEL	David Goffin	96	4
	Aslan Karatsev	100	5
GBR	Billy Harris	105	6
FRA	Luca Van Assche	111	7
FRA	Harold Mayot	112	8

- ^{1} Rankings are as of August 5, 2024.

=== Other entrants ===
The following players received wildcards into the singles main draw:

- (United States) Tristan Boyer
- (United States) Braden Shick
- (United States) Cooper Williams

The following players received entry into the singles main draw as special exempts:

- (United States) Nishesh Basavareddy
- (Hong Kong) Coleman Wong

The following players received entry into the singles main draw as alternates:

- (Serbia) Hamad Medjedovic
- (United States) Nicolas Moreno de Alboran

The following players received entry from the qualifying draw:

- (Italy) Mattia Bellucci
- (Canada) Gabriel Diallo
- (Italy) Matteo Gigante
- (South Korea) Hong Seong-chan
- (France) Kyrian Jacquet
- (United States) Emilio Nava

== Women's singles main draw entrants ==
=== Seeds ===
Country	Player	Rank	Seed
SUI	Viktorija Golubic	76	1
MEX	Renata Zarazúa	103	2
JPN	Mai Hontama	105	3
ESP	Rebeka Masarova	106	4
USA	McCartney Kessler	110	5
USA	Ann Li	114	6
ESP	Nuria Párrizas Díaz	116	7
ARG	Julia Riera	119	8

- Rankings are as of 5 August 2024.

=== Other entrants ===
The following players received wildcards into the singles main draw:

- (United States) Kayla Day
- (United States) Maria Mateas
- (United States) Kristina Penickova
- (United States) Alana Smith

The following players received entry into the singles main draw as special exempts:

- (Netherlands) Arianne Hartono
- (China) Wei Sijia

The following players received entry from the qualifying draw:

- (United States) Hina Inoue
- (Canada) Rebecca Marino
- (Australia) Taylah Preston
- (Thailand) Mananchaya Sawangkaew
- Oksana Selekhmeteva
- (Japan) Ena Shibahara
- (Italy) Lucrezia Stefanini
- (United Kingdom) Heather Watson

The following player received entry as a lucky loser:

- (United States) Victoria Hu
