= 2025 Cary Tennis Classic =

- Date: June 30 – July 6
- Edition: 13th (men); 2nd (women)
- Category: ATP Challenger Tour; ITF Women's World Tennis Tour
- Surface: Hard / Outdoor
- Location: Cary, United States

Champions

Men's singles
- (Japan) Rei Sakamoto

Women's singles
- (Czech Republic) Darja Viďmanová

Men's doubles
- (New Zealand) Finn Reynolds / (New Zealand) James Watt

Women's doubles
- (United States) Ayana Akli / (United States) Abigail Rencheli
| ← 2024 · | Cary Tennis Classic | · 2026 → |

The 2025 Cary Tennis Classic was a professional tennis tournament played on outdoor hard courts. It was the 13th edition of the tournament, which was part of the 2025 ATP Challenger Tour, and the second edition of the tournament, which was part of the 2025 ITF Women's World Tennis Tour. It took place in Cary, North Carolina, United States, between June 30 and July 6, 2025.

== Champions ==
=== Men's singles ===
- (Japan) Rei Sakamoto def. (Canada) Liam Draxl 6–1, 6–4.

=== Women's singles ===
- (Czech Republic) Darja Viďmanová def. (United States) Monika Ekstrand 6–3, 6–1.

=== Men's doubles ===
- (New Zealand) Finn Reynolds / (New Zealand) James Watt def. (Australia) Patrick Harper / (United States) Trey Hilderbrand 6–3, 6–7^{(2–7)}, [10–5].

=== Women's doubles ===
- (United States) Ayana Akli / (United States) Abigail Rencheli def. (South Africa) Gabriella Broadfoot / (United States) Maddy Zampardo 6–3, 6–2.

== Men's singles main-draw entrants ==
=== Seeds ===
| Country | Player | Rank^{1} | Seed |
|---|---|---|---|
| AUS | Tristan Schoolkate | 102 | 1 |
| CAN | Liam Draxl | 150 | 2 |
| AUS | Omar Jasika | 205 | 3 |
| CAN | Alexis Galarneau | 210 | 4 |
| | ~~Aslan Karatsev~~ | ~~216~~ | ~~5~~ |
| JPN | Rio Noguchi | 222 | 6 |
| COL | Nicolás Mejía | 243 | 7 |
| USA | Patrick Kypson | 246 | 8 |
| AUS | Bernard Tomic | 248 | 9 |

- ^{1} Rankings are as of June 23, 2025.

=== Other entrants ===
The following players received wildcards into the singles main draw:

- (United States) Stefan Dostanic
- (United States) William Manning
- (United States) Ian Mayew

The following player received entry into the singles main draw using a protected ranking:

- (Australia) Philip Sekulic

The following players received entry into the singles main draw through the Junior Accelerator programme:

- (United States) Kaylan Bigun
- (South Korea) Roh Ho-young

The following players received entry into the singles main draw as alternates:

- (United States) Andre Ilagan
- (Japan) Masamichi Imamura
- (United States) Andres Martin

The following players received entry from the qualifying draw:

- (Estonia) Daniil Glinka
- (United States) Strong Kirchheimer
- (Japan) Hiroki Moriya
- (United States) Alex Rybakov
- (United States) Joshua Sheehy
- (United States) Michael Zheng

== Women's main draw entrants ==
=== Seeds ===
| Country | Player | Rank^{1} | Seed |
|---|---|---|---|
| USA | Whitney Osuigwe | 159 | 1 |
| AUS | Destanee Aiava | 161 | 2 |
| ITA | Lucrezia Stefanini | 162 | 3 |
| NED | Arianne Hartono | 187 | 4 |
| GEO | Mariam Bolkvadze | 198 | 5 |
| USA | Hanna Chang | 227 | 6 |
| CAN | Kayla Cross | 229 | 7 |
| SUI | Leonie Kung | 235 | 8 |

- ^{1} Rankings are as of June 30, 2025.

=== Other entrants ===
The following players received wildcards into the singles main draw:

- (United States) Maddy Zampardo
- (United States) Reese Brantmeier
- (United States) Fiona Crawley

The following players received entry from the qualifying draw:

- (United States) Rachel Gailis
- (Japan) Mayu Crossley
- (Japan) Wakana Sonobe
- (United States) Usue Maitane Arconada
- (United States) Victoria Hu
- (China) Xiaodi You
- (United States) Lea Ma
- (United States) Monika Ekstrand
