= Liam Draxl =

Canadian tennis player (born 2001)

- Draxl at the 2026 Wimbledon Championships
- Country (sports): Canada
- Born: December 5, 2001 (age 24) Newmarket, Canada
- Height: 1.85 m (6 ft 1 in)
- Turned pro: 2023
- Plays: Right-handed (two-handed backhand)
- College: University of Kentucky-B.A.Comm
- Prize money: US $642,232

Singles
- Career record: 3–3
- Career titles: 0
- Highest ranking: No. 113 (28 July 2025)
- Current ranking: No. 158 (22 June 2026)

Grand Slam singles results
- Australian Open: 1R (2026)
- French Open: Q2 (2026)
- Wimbledon: Q1 (2025, 2026)
- US Open: Q3 (2026)

Doubles
- Career record: 1–3
- Career titles: 0
- Highest ranking: No. 110 (4 August 2025)
- Current ranking: No. 268 (22 June 2026)
- Last updated on: 22 June 2026.

Liam Draxl (born December 5, 2001) is a Canadian tennis player. He has a career-high ATP singles ranking of world No. 113, achieved on 28 July 2025 and a doubles ranking of No. 110, achieved on 4 August 2025. He is currently the No. 4 Canadian player.

== College career ==
Draxl played college tennis at the University of Kentucky. He compiled a 14–8 record in singles as a freshman and 25–3 as a sophomore. He was named the National Player of the Year by the International Tennis Federation following his sophomore year in 2021 and was the first Wildcat to earn this award.

== Professional career ==
=== 2021–2022: Maiden Challenger title and Masters debut in doubles ===
Draxl won his first Challenger title at the 2021 Kentucky Bank Tennis Championships in Lexington with Stefan Kozlov.

Draxl made his ATP main draw debut at the 2022 National Bank Open after receiving a wildcard into the doubles main draw with Cleeve Harper, but lost in straight sets to Simone Bolelli and Fabio Fognini.

=== 2023: Turned Pro, Challenger singles title, top 300 ===
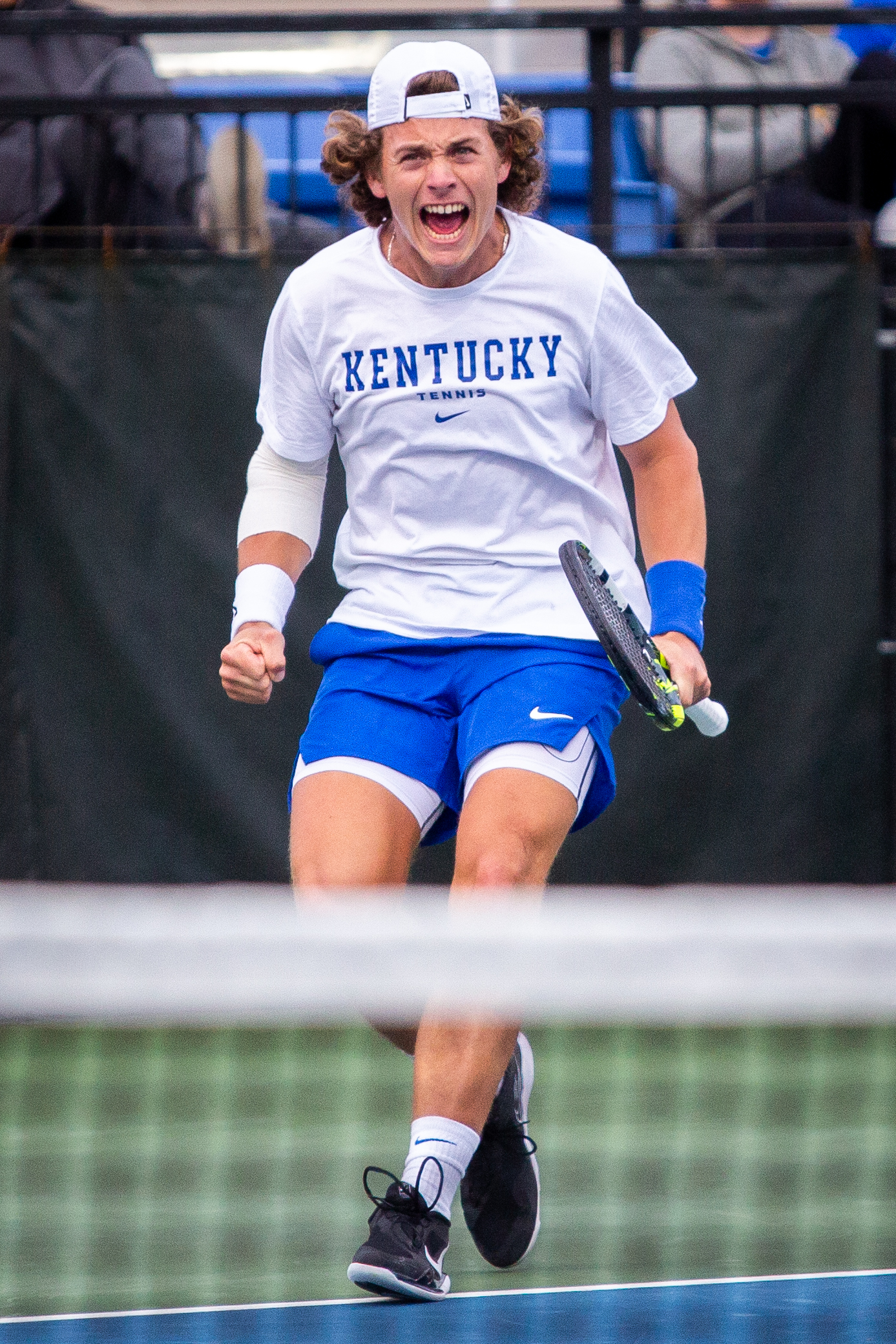
Draxl celebrating a score in 2023

He turned pro in June 2023 and in November won his first singles title at the 2023 Calgary National Bank Challenger, in just the second tournament at this level in the season. As a result he rose 100 positions, and on 13 November 2023 he reached the top 300 at world No. 297.

=== 2024: Five doubles Challengers titles, Top 250 in singles ===
Draxl reached the top 250 in the rankings on 10 June 2024, following a semifinal showing at the 2024 Tyler Tennis Championships where he lost to Brandon Holt. In doubles he won five Challenger titles during the season, his last two tournaments being in Puerto Vallarta (with Benjamin Sigouin) and Manzanillo (with Cleeve Harper), and reached a new career-high in the doubles rankings of No. 132 on 2 December 2024.

=== 2025: Record seven Challenger finals, Masters & Top 125 debuts ===
Draxl reached his third Challenger singles final at the 2025 Oeiras Indoors but lost to Hamad Medjedovic in straight sets. Following another final at the Oeiras Indoors III he moved into the top 200 at world No. 183 in the singles rankings on 27 January 2025. Following his final showing at the 2025 Sarasota Open and at the 2025 Savannah Challenger, Draxl moved into the top 150 in the singles rankings in May 2025.

In July, Draxl reached three consecutive Challenger finals. He reached the final at the 2025 Cary Tennis Classic, where he became the first player to reach five Challenger finals in 2025. He lost to Rei Sakamoto in the final. The following week, Draxl reached his sixth Challenger final of the year at the Winnipeg Challenger, where he defeated top seed Alexander Blockx to win his second Challenger title. As a result he clinched the "Road to the NBO" wildcard to make his first main draw ATP Tour appearance at the 2025 National Bank Open. The following week, Draxl defeated Alexander Blockx again in the semifinal in Granby, to reach a season-record seventh Challenger final. He lost to August Holmgren in the final.

Draxl received a wildcard to the main draw of the Canadian Open to make his ATP Tour debut. He lost to Pablo Carreño Busta in the first round.

=== 2026: Grand Slam debut ===
In January, Draxl made his Grand Slam debut at the Australian Open as a qualifier. He lost to Damir Džumhur in the first round. He also made his debut as a qualifier at the Masters in Miami, losing in the first round to Quentin Halys in three sets.

== Personal life ==
Draxl's father is Brian Draxl who serves as the head tennis pro at the Newmarket Community Tennis Club.

== Performance timeline ==
Key
W	F	SF	QF	#R	RR	Q#	DNQ	A	NH

(W) winner; (F) finalist; (SF) semifinalist; (QF) quarterfinalist; (#R) rounds 4, 3, 2, 1; (RR) round-robin stage; (Q#) qualification round; (DNQ) did not qualify; (A) absent; (NH) not held; (SR) strike rate (events won / competed); (W–L) win–loss record.

=== Singles ===
Tournament	2024	2025	2026	SR	W–L	Win%
Grand Slam tournaments
Australian Open	A	A	1R	0 / 1	0–1	0%
French Open	A	Q1	Q2	0 / 0	0–0	–
Wimbledon	A	Q1	Q1	0 / 0	0–0	–
US Open	A	Q1	Q3	0 / 0	0–0	–
Win–loss	0–0	0–0	0–1	0 / 1	0–1	0%
ATP Masters 1000
Indian Wells Open	A	A	Q1	0 / 0	0–0	–
Miami Open	A	Q2	1R	0 / 1	0–1	0%
Monte-Carlo Masters	A	A	A	0 / 0	0–0	–
Madrid Open	A	A	A	0 / 0	0–0	–
Italian Open	A	A	A	0 / 0	0–0	–
Canadian Open	Q1	1R	1R	0 / 2	0–2	0%
Cincinnati Open	A	Q2	A	0 / 0	0–0	–
Shanghai Masters	A	Q2	Q2	0 / 0	0–0	–
Paris Masters	A	A	A	0 / 0	0–0	–
Win–loss	0–0	0–1	0–2	0 / 3	0–3	0%

== ATP Challenger Tour finals ==
=== Singles: 11 (2 titles, 9 runner-ups) ===
Legend ATP Challenger Tour (2–8)	Finals by surface Hard (2–6) Clay (0–2)

Result	W–L	Date	Tournament	Tier	Surface	Opponent	Score
Win	1–0	Nov 2023	Calgary Challenger, Canada	Challenger	Hard	(Germany) Dominik Koepfer	6–4, 6–3
Loss	1–1	Nov 2024	Puerto Vallarta Open, Mexico	Challenger	Hard	(United States) Nishesh Basavareddy	3–6, 6–7^{(4–7)}
Loss	1–2	Jan 2025	Oeiras Indoors, Portugal	Challenger	Hard (i)	(Serbia) Hamad Medjedovic	1–6, 3–6
Loss	1–3	Jan 2025	Oeiras Indoors III, Portugal	Challenger	Hard (i)	(Belgium) Alexander Blockx	5–7, 1–6
Loss	1–4	Apr 2025	Sarasota Open, US	Challenger	Clay (green)	(United States) Emilio Nava	2–6, 6–7^{(2–7)}
Loss	1–5	Apr 2025	Savannah Challenger, US	Challenger	Clay (green)	(Colombia) Nicolás Mejía	6–2, 2–6, 6–7^{(3–7)}
Loss	1–6	Jun 2025	Cary Tennis Classic, US	Challenger	Hard	(Japan) Rei Sakamoto	1–6, 4–6
Win	2–6	Jul 2025	Winnipeg Challenger, Canada	Challenger	Hard	(Belgium) Alexander Blockx	1–6, 6–3, 6–4
Loss	2–7	Jul 2025	Championnats de Granby, Canada	Challenger	Hard	(Denmark) August Holmgren	3–6, 3–6
Loss	2–8	Jul 2026	Winnipeg Challenger, Canada	Challenger	Hard	(United Kingdom) Toby Samuel	4–6, 2–6
Loss	2–9	Oct 2026	Sioux Falls Challenger, US	Challenger	Hard (i)	(Switzerland) Dylan Dietrich	6–1, 3–6, 4–6

=== Doubles: 12 (8 titles, 4 runner-ups) ===
Legend ATP Challenger Tour (8–4)	Finals by surface Hard (6–2) Clay (2–2)

Result	W–L	Date	Tournament	Tier	Surface	Partner	Opponents	Score
Win	1–0	Aug 2021	Lexington Challenger, US	Challenger	Hard	(United States) Stefan Kozlov	(United States) Alex Rybakov (United States) Reese Stalder	6–2, 6–7^{(5–7)}, [10–7]
Loss	1–1	Nov 2023	Challenger de Drummondville, Canada	Challenger	Hard (i)	(United Kingdom) Giles Hussey	(Sweden) Andre Goransson (United Kingdom) Toby Samuel	7–6^{(7–2)}, 3–6, [8–10]
Loss	1–2	Mar 2024	São Léo Open, Brazil	Challenger	Clay	(Italy) Alexander Weis	(Brazil) Marcelo Demoliner (Brazil) Orlando Luz	5–7, 6–3, [8–10]
Win	2–2	Jun 2024	Little Rock Challenger, US	Challenger	Hard	(Canada) Benjamin Sigouin	(India) Rithvik Choudary Bollipalli (Mexico) Hans Hach Verdugo	6–4, 3–6, [10–7]
Win	3–2	Sep 2024	Izida Cup II, Bulgaria	Challenger	Clay	(Canada) Cleeve Harper	(Italy) Filippo Romano (Italy) Francesco Maestrelli	6–1, 3–6, [12–10]
Loss	3–3	Sep 2024	Sibiu Open, Romania	Challenger	Clay	(Canada) Cleeve Harper	(Peru) Alexander Merino (Germany) Christoph Negritu	2–6, 6–7^{(2–7)}
Win	4–3	Oct 2024	MarketBeat Open, US	Challenger	Hard (i)	(Canada) Cleeve Harper	(United States) Ryan Seggerman (United States) Patrik Trhac	7–5, 6–3
Loss	4–4	Nov 2024	Challenger de Drummondville, Canada	Challenger	Hard (i)	(Canada) Cleeve Harper	(United States) Robert Cash (United States) J.J. Tracy	2–6, 4–6
Win	5–4	Nov 2024	Puerto Vallarta Open, Mexico	Challenger	Hard	(Canada) Benjamin Sigouin	(United States) Ryan Seggerman (United States) Karl Poling	7–6^{(7–5)}, 6–2
Win	6–4	Dec 2024	Manzanillo Open, Mexico	Challenger	Hard	(Canada) Cleeve Harper	(Canada) Benjamin Sigouin (New Zealand) Finn Reynolds	6–7^{(4–7)}, 7–5, [12–10]
Win	7–4	Jan 2025	Oeiras Indoors III, Portugal	Challenger	Hard (i)	(Canada) Cleeve Harper	(Netherlands) Matwé Middelkoop (Ukraine) Denys Molchanov	1–6, 7–5, [10–6]
Win	8–4	Apr 2025	Tallahassee Tennis Classic, US	Challenger	Clay (green)	(Canada) Cleeve Harper	(United States) James Cerretani (United States) George Goldhoff	6–2, 6–3

== ITF World Tennis Tour finals ==
=== Singles: 13 (7 titles, 6 runner-ups) ===
Legend ITF WTT (7–6)	Finals by surface Hard (7–5) Clay (0–1)

Result	W–L	Date	Tournament	Tier	Surface	Opponent	Score
Cancelled	0–0	Jul 2021	M15 Weston, US	WTT	Clay	(United States) Stefan Kozlov	6–7^{(5–7)}, 6–3, canc.
Win	1–0	Dec 2021	M15 Cancún, Mexico	WTT	Hard	(United States) Christian Langmo	6–7^{(4–7)}, 7–6^{(7–5)}, 7–6^{(8–6)}
Win	2–0	Dec 2021	M15 Cancún, Mexico	WTT	Hard	(United States) Isaiah Strode	6–0, 6–1
Loss	2–1	Jun 2022	M25 Wichita, US	WTT	Hard	(France) Clément Chidekh	2–6, 2–6
Loss	2–2	Dec 2022	M15 Santo Domingo, Dominican Republic	WTT	Hard	(Dominican Republic) Nick Hardt	4–6, 3–6
Loss	2–3	Jun 2023	M15 Santo Domingo, Dominican Republic	WTT	Hard	(United States) Tauheed Browning	6–7^{(5–7)}, 7–5, 6–7^{(8–10)}
Loss	2–4	Jul 2023	M25 Santo Domingo, Dominican Republic	WTT	Hard	(United States) Martin Damm Jr.	6–7^{(5–7)}, 4–6
Win	3–4	Sep 2023	M15 Champaign, US	WTT	Hard	(United States) William Grant	6–1, 6–3
Win	4–4	Oct 2023	M15 Albuquerque, US	WTT	Hard	(United States) William Grant	6–0, 6–2
Loss	4–5	Oct 2023	M15 Ithaca, US	WTT	Hard	(Romania) Radu Mihai Papoe	6–3, 1–6, 2–6
Loss	4–6	Sep 2024	M15 Constanta, Romania	WTT	Clay	(Romania) Nicholas David Ionel	3–6, 4–6
Win	5–6	Oct 2024	M25 Edmonton, Canada	WTT	Hard	(United States) Patrick Maloney	6–4, 6–1
Win	6–6	Nov 2024	M25 Saint-Augustin-de-Desmaures, Canada	WTT	Hard	(Canada) Alexis Galarneau	6–1, 6–3
Win	7–6	Dec 2024	M15 Huamantla, Mexico	WTT	Hard	(Ukraine) Aleksandr Braynin	6–4, 6–1

=== Doubles: 10 (5 titles, 5 runner-ups) ===
Legend ITF WTT (5–5)	Finals by surface Hard (5–4) Clay (0–1)

Result	W–L	Date	Tournament	Tier	Surface	Partner	Opponents	Score
Loss	0–1	Nov 2020	M15 Fayetteville, US	WTT	Hard	(United States) Aleksandar Kovacevic	(United Kingdom) Charles Broom (Chile) Matías Soto	6–2, 2–6, [5–10]
Loss	0–2	Oct 2021	M15 Vero Beach, US	WTT	Clay	(United States) Ben Shelton	(Denmark) Johannes Ingildsen (Portugal) Duarte Vale	3–6, 4–6
Win	1–2	Oct 2021	M15 Tallahassee, US	WTT	Hard (i)	(United States) John McNally	(Australia) Thomas Fancutt (Northern Mariana Islands) Colin Sinclair	6–2, 6–3
Win	2–2	Dec 2021	M15 Cancún, Mexico	WTT	Hard	(Canada) Cleeve Harper	(Brazil) Luís Britto (Brazil) Marcelo Zormann	7–5, 7–6^{(7–4)}
Loss	2–3	Dec 2021	M15 Cancún, Mexico	WTT	Hard	(Canada) Cleeve Harper	(Switzerland) Yannik Steinegger (Germany) Tim Handel	6–7^{(5–7)}, 3–6
Loss	2–4	May 2022	M15 Vero Beach, US	WTT	Clay	(United Kingdom) Millen Hurrion	(United States) Nishesh Basavareddy (Venezuela) Ricardo Rodríguez-Pace	4–6, 3–6
Win	3–4	Nov 2022	M15 Santo Domingo, Dominican Republic	WTT	Hard	(Costa Rica) Jesse Flores	(Dominican Republic) Peter Bertran (United States) Joshua Sheehy	6–0, 6–3
Win	4–4	Jun 2023	M15 Santo Domingo, Dominican Republic	WTT	Hard	(Canada) Joshua Lapadat	(United States) Keshav Chopra (United States) Andres Martin	4–6, 6–3, [10–4]
Loss	4–5	Jul 2023	M25 Laval, Canada	WTT	Hard	(Canada) Jonathan Sorbo	(Canada) Joshua Lapadat (United States) J.J. Mercer	1–4 ret.
Win	5–5	Oct 2024	M25 Edmonton, Canada	WTT	Hard	(Canada) Cleeve Harper	(Canada) Benjamin Thomas George (Canada) Alvin Nicholas Tudorica	6–4, 6–4

== Junior Grand Slam finals ==
=== Doubles: 1 (1 runner-up) ===
Result	Year	Tournament	Surface	Partner	Opponents	Score
Loss	2019	Wimbledon	Grass	(United States) Govind Nanda	(Czech Republic) Jonáš Forejtek (Czech Republic) Jiří Lehečka	5–7, 4–6
