= 2026 São Léo Open – Doubles =

Doubles
- 2026 São Léo Open

Final
- Champions: (Bolivia) Boris Arias (Denmark) Johannes Ingildsen
- Runners-up: (Spain) Nicolás Álvarez Varona (Spain) Mario Mansilla Díez
- Score: 6–3, 4–6, [10–8]

Events
Singles	Doubles
- São Léo Open

Marcelo Demoliner and Orlando Luz were the defending champions but chose not to defend their title.

Boris Arias and Johannes Ingildsen won the title after defeating Nicolás Álvarez Varona and Mario Mansilla Díez 6–3, 4–6, [10–8] in the final.

== Seeds ==
1. (Bolivia) Boris Arias / (Denmark) Johannes Ingildsen (champions)
2. (Brazil) Bruno Oliveira / (Brazil) Marcelo Zormann (first round)
3. (Bolivia) Murkel Dellien / (Argentina) Gonzalo Villanueva (quarterfinals)
4. (Brazil) Luís Britto / (Brazil) Paulo André Saraiva dos Santos (semifinals)

== Draw ==
Key

- Q = Qualifier
- WC = Wild card
- LL = Lucky loser
- Alt = Alternate
- ITF = ITF entry
- PR = Protected ranking
- SR = Special ranking
- SE = Special exempt
- JE = Junior exempt
- JR = Junior Accelerator Programme entrant
- CO = College Accelerator Programme entrant
- NG = Next Gen Accelerator Program entrant
- w/o = Walkover
- r = Retired
- d = Defaulted

First round
1	(Bolivia) B Arias (Denmark) J Ingildsen	0	7^{7}	[10]
(Argentina) LE Ambrogi (Argentina) Lucio Ratti	6	6^{3}	[6]
(Brazil) P Boscardin Dias (Brazil) G Heide	w/o
(Argentina) JM La Serna (Argentina) L Midón
4	(Brazil) L Britto (Brazil) PA Saraiva dos Santos	7^{11}	6
(Peru) A Huertas del Pino (Peru) C Huertas del Pino	6^{9}	3
(Brazil) Gabriel Roveri Sidney (Argentina) JB Torres	6	6
Alt	(Chile) Anders Matta (Chile) Daniel Antonio Núñez	1	1
(Argentina) Valentín Basel (Argentina) F Ribero	6	6
WC	(Brazil) JVC Loureiro (Brazil) Natan Rodrigues	4	3
WC	(Brazil) P Sakamoto (Brazil) João Eduardo Schiessl	5	6	[6]
3	(Bolivia) M Dellien (Argentina) G Villanueva	7	3	[10]
(Argentina) Thiago Cigarrán (Argentina) F Díaz Acosta	6	3	[7]
(Spain) N Álvarez Varona (Spain) M Mansilla Díez	3	6	[10]
(Brazil) D Dutra da Silva (Switzerland) J Nikles	6	6
2	(Brazil) Bruno Oliveira (Brazil) M Zormann	4	2

Quarterfinals
1	(Bolivia) B Arias (Denmark) J Ingildsen	w/o
(Brazil) P Boscardin Dias (Brazil) G Heide
4	(Brazil) L Britto (Brazil) PA Saraiva dos Santos	6	7^{8}
(Brazil) G Roveri Sidney (Argentina) JB Torres	1	6^{6}
(Argentina) V Basel (Argentina) F Ribero	6	6
3	(Bolivia) M Dellien (Argentina) G Villanueva	2	2
(Spain) N Álvarez Varona (Spain) M Mansilla Díez	7^{7}	3	[11]
(Brazil) D Dutra da Silva (Switzerland) J Nikles	6^{5}	6	[9]

Semifinals
1	(Bolivia) B Arias (Denmark) J Ingildsen	6	6
4	(Brazil) L Britto (Brazil) PA Saraiva dos Santos	2	2
(Argentina) V Basel (Argentina) F Ribero	3	1
(Spain) N Álvarez Varona (Spain) M Mansilla Díez	6	6

Final
1	(Bolivia) B Arias (Denmark) J Ingildsen	6	4	[10]
(Spain) N Álvarez Varona (Spain) M Mansilla Díez	3	6	[8]
