= 2026 Campeonato Internacional de Tênis de Campinas =

- Date: 6 – 12 April
- Edition: 15th
- Surface: Clay
- Location: Campinas, Brazil

Champions

Singles
- (Brazil) Gustavo Heide

Doubles
- (Spain) Nicolás Álvarez Varona / (Spain) Mario Mansilla Díez
- Campeonato Internacional de Tênis de Campinas

The 2026 Copa Internacional de Tênis was a professional tennis tournament played on clay courts. It was the 15th edition of the tournament which was part of the 2026 ATP Challenger Tour. It took place in Campinas, Brazil between 6 and 12 April 2026.

== Singles main-draw entrants ==
=== Seeds ===
Country	Player	Rank^{1}	Seed
PER	Gonzalo Bueno	206	1
ECU	Álvaro Guillén Meza	211	2
BRA	João Lucas Reis da Silva	212	3
ARG	Lautaro Midón	217	4
ARG	Facundo Díaz Acosta	222	5
BRA	Pedro Boscardin Dias	240	6
ARG	Guido Iván Justo	270	7
PER	Juan Pablo Varillas	271	8

- ^{1} Rankings as of 30 March 2026.

=== Other entrants ===
The following players received wildcards into the singles main draw:

- (Brazil) Victor Braga
- (Brazil) Enzo Camargo Lima
- (Brazil) Paulo André Saraiva dos Santos

The following players received entry into the singles main draw as alternates:

- (Switzerland) Johan Nikles
- (Argentina) Lucio Ratti
- (Argentina) Lorenzo Joaquín Rodríguez

The following players received entry from the qualifying draw:

- (Argentina) Santiago de la Fuente
- (Brazil) Bruno Fernandez
- (Peru) Conner Huertas del Pino
- (Brazil) José Pereira
- (Brazil) Victor Hugo Remondy Pagotto
- (Argentina) Franco Ribero

== Champions ==
=== Singles ===
- (Brazil) Gustavo Heide def. (Peru) Gonzalo Bueno 6–2, 7–5.

=== Doubles ===
- (Spain) Nicolás Álvarez Varona / (Spain) Mario Mansilla Díez def. (Argentina) Mariano Kestelboim / (Brazil) Marcelo Zormann 3–6, 6–1, [10–8].
