= 2026 São Léo Open – Singles =

Singles
- 2026 São Léo Open

Final
- Champion: (Argentina) Facundo Díaz Acosta
- Runner-up: (Bolivia) Hugo Dellien
- Score: 5–7, 6–2, 6–4

Events
| Singles | Doubles |
- São Léo Open

Daniel Vallejo was the defending champion but chose not to defend his title.

Facundo Díaz Acosta won the title after defeating Hugo Dellien 5–7, 6–2, 6–4 in the final.

== Seeds ==
1. (Chile) Tomás Barrios Vera (first round)
2. (Bolivia) Hugo Dellien (final)
3. (Bolivia) Juan Carlos Prado Ángelo (second round)
4. (Ecuador) Álvaro Guillén Meza (second round)
5. (Peru) Gonzalo Bueno (first round)
6. (Argentina) Lautaro Midón (quarterfinals)
7. (Argentina) Facundo Díaz Acosta (champion)
8. (Brazil) Felipe Meligeni Alves (second round, retired)

== Draw ==
Key

- Q = Qualifier
- WC = Wild card
- LL = Lucky loser
- Alt = Alternate
- ITF = ITF entry
- PR = Protected ranking
- SR = Special ranking
- SE = Special exempt
- JE = Junior exempt
- JR = Junior Accelerator Programme entrant
- CO = College Accelerator Programme entrant
- NG = Next Gen Accelerator Program entrant
- w/o = Walkover
- r = Retired
- d = Defaulted

=== Finals ===
Semifinals
WC | (Brazil) Paulo André Saraiva dos Santos | 3 | 1
7 | (Argentina) Facundo Díaz Acosta | 6 | 6
(Brazil) Gustavo Heide | 3 | 5
2/WC | (Bolivia) Hugo Dellien | 6 | 7

Final
7 | (Argentina) Facundo Díaz Acosta | 5 | 6 | 6
2/WC | (Bolivia) Hugo Dellien | 7 | 2 | 4

=== Top half ===
First round
1 | (Chile) T Barrios Vera | 4 | 3
(Bolivia) M Dellien | 6 | 6
Alt | (Brazil) João Eduardo Schiessl | 6 | 3 | 0
Q | (Switzerland) J Nikles | 3 | 6 | 6
Q | (Argentina) Máximo Zeitune | 6^{4} | 3
Alt | (Argentina) Lorenzo Joaquín Rodríguez | 7^{7} | 6
WC | (Brazil) PA Saraiva dos Santos | 6 | 3 | 6
5 | (Peru) G Bueno | 2 | 6 | 4
4 | (Ecuador) A Guillén Meza | 3 | 6 | 7^{7}
Q | (Argentina) LE Ambrogi | 6 | 4 | 6^{4}
Q | (Peru) C Huertas del Pino | 6 | 6
(Brazil) P Sakamoto | 4 | 3
Q | (Argentina) Carlos María Zárate | 3 | 3
(Peru) JP Varillas | 6 | 6
Q | (Argentina) S de la Fuente | 3 | 2
7 | (Argentina) F Díaz Acosta | 6 | 6

Second round
(Bolivia) M Dellien | 7 | 6
Q | (Switzerland) J Nikles | 5 | 4
Alt | (Argentina) LJ Rodríguez | 5 | 6 | 6^{6}
WC | (Brazil) PA Saraiva dos Santos | 7 | 3 | 7^{8}
4 | (Ecuador) A Guillén Meza | 4 | 4
Q | (Peru) C Huertas del Pino | 6 | 6
(Peru) JP Varillas | 3 | 6^{4}
7 | (Argentina) F Díaz Acosta | 6 | 7^{7}

Quarterfinals
(Bolivia) M Dellien | 4 | 2
WC | (Brazil) PA Saraiva dos Santos | 6 | 6
Q | (Peru) C Huertas del Pino | 6 | 1 | 4
7 | (Argentina) F Díaz Acosta | 4 | 6 | 6

Semifinals
WC | (Brazil) PA Saraiva dos Santos | 3 | 1
7 | (Argentina) F Díaz Acosta | 6 | 6

=== Bottom half ===
First round
8 | (Brazil) F Meligeni Alves | 3 | 6 | 2
Alt | (Uruguay) J Aguilar Cardozo | 6 | 0 | 0^{r}
(Argentina) JM La Serna | 7^{7} | 2 | 6
(Argentina) GI Justo | 6^{4} | 6 | 2
(Brazil) G Heide | 6 | 6
(Brazil) P Boscardin Dias | 1 | 3
(Brazil) D Dutra da Silva | 4 | 6^{6}
3 | (Bolivia) JC Prado Ángelo | 6 | 7^{8}
6 | (Argentina) L Midón | 6 | 3 | 6
WC | (Brazil) Bruno Fernandez | 3 | 6 | 4
(Spain) N Álvarez Varona | 7 | 2 | 0^{r}
(Argentina) JB Torres | 5 | 6 | 2
(Argentina) G Villanueva | 6^{5} | 6 | 6
Alt | (Argentina) V Aboian | 7^{7} | 1 | 3
(Brazil) E Ribeiro | 6 | 1 | 2
2/WC | (Bolivia) H Dellien | 4 | 6 | 6

Second round
8 | (Brazil) F Meligeni Alves | 6 | 3 | 0^{r}
(Argentina) JM La Serna | 2 | 6 | 2
(Brazil) G Heide | 6 | 6
3 | (Bolivia) JC Prado Ángelo | 4 | 3
6 | (Argentina) L Midón | 7 | 6
(Argentina) JB Torres | 5 | 3
(Argentina) G Villanueva | 6^{2} | 4
2/WC | (Bolivia) H Dellien | 7^{7} | 6

Quarterfinals
(Argentina) JM La Serna | 1 | 1
(Brazil) G Heide | 6 | 6
6 | (Argentina) L Midón | 6^{6} | 1
2/WC | (Bolivia) H Dellien | 7^{8} | 6

Semifinals
(Brazil) G Heide | 3 | 5
2/WC | (Bolivia) H Dellien | 6 | 7
