= 2021 Rio Tennis Classic – Doubles =

Doubles
- 2021 Rio Tennis Classic

Final
- Champions: (Brazil) Orlando Luz (Brazil) Rafael Matos
- Runners-up: (United States) James Cerretani (Brazil) Fernando Romboli
- Score: 6–3, 7–6^{(7–2)}

Events
Singles	Doubles
← 2017 ·	Rio Tennis Classic	· 2022 →

Máximo González and Fabrício Neis were the defending champions but chose not to defend their title.

Orlando Luz and Rafael Matos won the title after defeating James Cerretani and Fernando Romboli 6–3, 7–6^{(7–2)} in the final.

== Seeds ==
1. (Brazil) Orlando Luz / (Brazil) Rafael Matos (champions)
2. (United States) James Cerretani / (Brazil) Fernando Romboli (final)
3. (Colombia) Nicolás Barrientos / (Colombia) Alejandro Gómez (first round)
4. (Peru) Alexander Merino / (Bolivia) Federico Zeballos (semifinals)

== Draw ==
=== Key ===
- Q = Qualifier
- WC = Wild card
- LL = Lucky loser
- Alt = Alternate
- SE = Special exempt
- PR = Protected ranking
- ITF = ITF entry
- JE = Junior exempt
- w/o = Walkover
- r = Retired
- d = Defaulted
- SR = Special ranking

First round
1	(Brazil) O Luz (Brazil) R Matos	6	6^{4}	[10]
WC	(Brazil) P Boscardin Dias (Brazil) J Pereira	2	7^{7}	[7]
(Brazil) JL Reis da Silva (Brazil) Gabriel Roveri Sidney	w/o
(Argentina) F Comesaña (Argentina) G Villanueva
4	(Peru) A Merino (Bolivia) F Zeballos	7^{7}	3	[10]
(Bolivia) B Arias (Brazil) D Dutra da Silva	6^{5}	6	[5]
WC	(Brazil) Victor Alves (Brazil) J Fonseca	7^{7}	6
WC	(Brazil) Rodrigo Braunstein (Brazil) Nicolas Oliveira	6^{5}	3
(Brazil) M Alves (Brazil) I Marcondes
(Brazil) Wilson Leite (Brazil) P Sakamoto	w/o
(Italy) L Darderi (Argentina) MF Descotte	3	6	[10]
3	(Colombia) N Barrientos (Colombia) A Gómez	6	4	[7]
(Russia) B Bobrov (Colombia) A González	1	6	[11]
(Switzerland) L Castelnuovo (Switzerland) J Nikles	6	3	[9]
(Argentina) F Díaz Acosta (Argentina) Facundo Juárez
2	(United States) J Cerretani (Brazil) F Romboli	w/o

Quarterfinals
1	(Brazil) O Luz (Brazil) R Matos	6	6
(Brazil) JL Reis da Silva (Brazil) G Roveri Sidney	0	4
4	(Peru) A Merino (Bolivia) F Zeballos	7	6
WC	(Brazil) V Alves (Brazil) J Fonseca	5	4
(Brazil) W Leite (Brazil) P Sakamoto	3	6^{6}
(Italy) L Darderi (Argentina) MF Descotte	6	7^{8}
(Russia) B Bobrov (Colombia) A González	2	6	[6]
2	(United States) J Cerretani (Brazil) F Romboli	6	3	[10]

Semifinals
1	(Brazil) O Luz (Brazil) R Matos	4	6	[10]
4	(Peru) A Merino (Bolivia) F Zeballos	6	3	[7]
(Italy) L Darderi (Argentina) MF Descotte	3	1
2	(United States) J Cerretani (Brazil) F Romboli	6	6

Final
1	(Brazil) O Luz (Brazil) R Matos	6	7^{7}
2	(United States) J Cerretani (Brazil) F Romboli	3	6^{2}
