= 2021 Rio Tennis Classic – Singles =

Singles
- 2021 Rio Tennis Classic

Final
- Champion: (Japan) Kaichi Uchida
- Runner-up: (Spain) Nicolás Álvarez Varona
- Score: 3–6, 6–3, 7–6^{(7–3)}

Events
Singles	Doubles
← 2017 ·	Rio Tennis Classic	· 2022 →

Carlos Berlocq was the defending champion but chose not to defend his title.

Kaichi Uchida won the title after defeating Nicolás Álvarez Varona 3–6, 6–3, 7–6^{(7–3)} in the final.

== Seeds ==
1. (Brazil) Thiago Seyboth Wild (quarterfinals)
2. (Argentina) Nicolás Kicker (semifinals)
3. (Argentina) Juan Pablo Ficovich (first round)
4. (Brazil) Matheus Pucinelli de Almeida (withdrew)
5. (Dominican Republic) Roberto Cid Subervi (first round, retired)
6. (Brazil) Orlando Luz (first round)
7. (Serbia) Peđa Krstin (first round)
8. (Japan) Kaichi Uchida (champion)

== Draw ==
Key

- Q = Qualifier
- WC = Wild card
- LL = Lucky loser
- Alt = Alternate
- ITF = ITF entry
- PR = Protected ranking
- SR = Special ranking
- SE = Special exempt
- JE = Junior exempt
- JR = Junior Accelerator Programme entrant
- CO = College Accelerator Programme entrant
- NG = Next Gen Accelerator Program entrant
- w/o = Walkover
- r = Retired
- d = Defaulted

=== Finals ===
Semifinals
8	(Japan) Kaichi Uchida	6	6
WC	(Brazil) Gabriel Décamps	2	3
(Spain) Nicolás Álvarez Varona	6	7
2	(Argentina) Nicolás Kicker	2	5

Final
8	(Japan) Kaichi Uchida	3	6	7^{7}
(Spain) Nicolás Álvarez Varona	6	3	6^{3}

=== Top half ===
First round
1	(Brazil) T Seyboth Wild	6	6
WC	(Brazil) Lorenzo Esquici	2	0
(Switzerland) J Nikles	6	6
Q	(Switzerland) L Castelnuovo	2	4
(Argentina) GA Olivieri	5	6	6
PR	(Brazil) G Clezar	7	4	3
(Argentina) G Villanueva	3	4
8	(Japan) K Uchida	6	6
3	(Argentina) JP Ficovich	6	1	2
(Colombia) A Gómez	4	6	6
WC	(Brazil) G Décamps	6	6
Q	(Colombia) N Barrientos	1	4
Q	(Brazil) R Matos	6	0	6
WC	(Brazil) Wilson Leite	4	6	2
(Brazil) D Dutra da Silva	7^{8}	6
6	(Brazil) O Luz	6^{6}	4

Second round
1	(Brazil) T Seyboth Wild	6	3	7
(Switzerland) J Nikles	1	6	5
(Argentina) GA Olivieri	6	3	1
8	(Japan) K Uchida	3	6	6
(Colombia) A Gómez	6	4	1
WC	(Brazil) G Décamps	3	6	6
Q	(Brazil) R Matos	3	0^{r}
(Brazil) D Dutra da Silva	6	0

Quarterfinals
1	(Brazil) T Seyboth Wild	4	1
8	(Japan) K Uchida	6	6
WC	(Brazil) G Décamps	6	4	6
(Brazil) D Dutra da Silva	4	6	2

Semifinals
8	(Japan) K Uchida	6	6
WC	(Brazil) G Décamps	2	3

=== Bottom half ===
First round
7	(Serbia) P Krstin	2	6^{6}
(Italy) L Darderi	6	7^{8}
(Argentina) F Díaz Acosta	3	6	3
(Spain) N Álvarez Varona	6	4	6
(Brazil) P Sakamoto	6	4	6
(Argentina) Facundo Juárez	4	6	4
LL	(United States) Roy Smith	6	7^{7}
LL	(Bolivia) F Zeballos	4	6^{4}
5	(Dominican Republic) R Cid Subervi	3	0^{r}
(Russia) B Bobrov	6	1
(Argentina) MF Descotte	6^{3}	4
Alt	(Brazil) M Alves	7^{7}	6
Q	(Brazil) J Pereira	2	7	4
SE	(Brazil) I Marcondes	6	5	6
(Colombia) A González	5	3
2	(Argentina) N Kicker	7	6

Second round
(Italy) L Darderi	3	1
(Spain) N Álvarez Varona	6	6
(Brazil) P Sakamoto	7^{10}	4	3
LL	(United States) R Smith	6^{8}	6	6
(Russia) B Bobrov	6^{4}	6	3
Alt	(Brazil) M Alves	7^{7}	3	6
SE	(Brazil) I Marcondes	4	1
2	(Argentina) N Kicker	6	6

Quarterfinals
(Spain) N Álvarez Varona	6	6
LL	(United States) R Smith	4	4
Alt	(Brazil) M Alves	6	6^{4}	4
2	(Argentina) N Kicker	3	7^{7}	6

Semifinals
(Spain) N Álvarez Varona	6	7
2	(Argentina) N Kicker	2	5
