= 2022 São Léo Open – Doubles =

Doubles
- 2022 São Léo Open

Final
- Champions: (Argentina) Guido Andreozzi (Argentina) Guillermo Durán
- Runners-up: (Brazil) Felipe Meligeni Alves (Brazil) João Lucas Reis da Silva
- Score: 5–1 ret.

Events
Singles	Doubles
← 2012 ·	São Léo Open	· 2024 →

This was the third edition of the tournament as an ATP Challenger Tour event and the first edition since 2012.

Guido Andreozzi and Guillermo Durán won the title leading 5–1 in the final after Felipe Meligeni Alves and João Lucas Reis da Silva retired.

== Seeds ==
1. (Argentina) Guido Andreozzi / (Argentina) Guillermo Durán (champions)
2. (Bolivia) Boris Arias / (Bolivia) Federico Zeballos (quarterfinals)
3. (Brazil) Daniel Dutra da Silva / (Venezuela) Luis David Martínez (first round)
4. (Kazakhstan) Grigoriy Lomakin / (Switzerland) Damien Wenger (first round)

== Draw ==
=== Key ===
- Q = Qualifier
- WC = Wild card
- LL = Lucky loser
- Alt = Alternate
- SE = Special exempt
- PR = Protected ranking
- ITF = ITF entry
- JE = Junior exempt
- w/o = Walkover
- r = Retired
- d = Defaulted
- SR = Special ranking

First round
1	(Argentina) G Andreozzi (Argentina) G Durán	6	6
WC	(Brazil) Fernando Yamacita (Brazil) Nicolas Zanellato	2	4
(Brazil) P Boscardin Dias (Brazil) E Ribeiro	2	4
(Dominican Republic) N Hardt (Brazil) Gabriel Roveri Sidney	6	6
4	(Kazakhstan) G Lomakin (Switzerland) D Wenger	6^{2}	6^{5}
(Brazil) O Luz (Brazil) M Zormann	7^{7}	7^{7}
WC	(Brazil) Lorenzo Esquici (Brazil) J Fonseca	6	6
(Argentina) JP Paz (Argentina) G Villanueva	3	3
(Brazil) F Meligeni Alves (Brazil) JL Reis da Silva	3	6	[10]
3	(Brazil) D Dutra da Silva (Venezuela) LD Martínez	6	4	[4]
(Brazil) M Alves (Brazil) G Heide	w/o
(Argentina) R Olivo (Argentina) TA Tirante
(Portugal) J Domingues (Portugal) G Elias	3	4
2	(Bolivia) B Arias (Bolivia) F Zeballos	6	6

Quarterfinals
1	(Argentina) G Andreozzi (Argentina) G Durán	4	6	[10]
(Dominican Republic) N Hardt (Brazil) G Roveri Sidney	6	0	[4]
(Brazil) O Luz (Brazil) M Zormann	7	7^{7}
WC	(Brazil) L Esquici (Brazil) J Fonseca	5	6^{1}
(Brazil) Wilson Leite (Brazil) T Seyboth Wild	6	2	[2]
(Brazil) F Meligeni Alves (Brazil) JL Reis da Silva	3	6	[10]
(Brazil) M Alves (Brazil) G Heide	6	6
2	(Bolivia) B Arias (Bolivia) F Zeballos	2	3

Semifinals
1	(Argentina) G Andreozzi (Argentina) G Durán	6	6
(Brazil) O Luz (Brazil) M Zormann	3	2
(Brazil) F Meligeni Alves (Brazil) JL Reis da Silva	w/o
(Brazil) M Alves (Brazil) G Heide

Final
1	(Argentina) G Andreozzi (Argentina) G Durán	5
(Brazil) F Meligeni Alves (Brazil) JL Reis da Silva	1^{r}
