= 2026 Campeonato Internacional de Tênis de Campinas – Singles =

Singles
- 2026 Campeonato Internacional de Tênis de Campinas

Final
- Champion: (Brazil) Gustavo Heide
- Runner-up: (Peru) Gonzalo Bueno
- Score: 6–2, 7–5

Events
Singles	Doubles
- Campeonato Internacional de Tênis de Campinas

Tomás Barrios Vera was the defending champion but chose not to defend his title.

Gustavo Heide won the title after defeating Gonzalo Bueno 6–2, 7–5 in the final.

== Seeds ==
1. (Peru) Gonzalo Bueno (final)
2. (Ecuador) Álvaro Guillén Meza (quarterfinals)
3. (Brazil) João Lucas Reis da Silva (first round)
4. (Argentina) Lautaro Midón (semifinals)
5. (Argentina) Facundo Díaz Acosta (second round, retired)
6. (Brazil) Pedro Boscardin Dias (semifinals)
7. (Argentina) Guido Iván Justo (quarterfinals)
8. (Peru) Juan Pablo Varillas (quarterfinals)

== Draw ==
Key

- Q = Qualifier
- WC = Wild card
- LL = Lucky loser
- Alt = Alternate
- ITF = ITF entry
- PR = Protected ranking
- SR = Special ranking
- SE = Special exempt
- JE = Junior exempt
- JR = Junior Accelerator Programme entrant
- CO = College Accelerator Programme entrant
- NG = Next Gen Accelerator Program entrant
- w/o = Walkover
- r = Retired
- d = Defaulted

=== Finals ===
Semifinals
1	(Peru) Gonzalo Bueno	5	6	6
4	(Argentina) Lautaro Midón	7	3	1
(Brazil) Gustavo Heide	7^{7}	6
6	(Brazil) Pedro Boscardin Dias	6^{1}	2

Final
1	(Peru) Gonzalo Bueno	2	5
(Brazil) Gustavo Heide	6	7

=== Top half ===
First round
1	(Peru) G Bueno	6	7
Q	(Brazil) Bruno Fernandez	2	5
(Spain) N Álvarez Varona	1	2
Alt	(Argentina) Lucio Ratti	6	6
Q	(Peru) C Huertas del Pino	2	3
(Argentina) H Casanova	6	6
(Brazil) E Ribeiro	6	4	6^{3}
5	(Argentina) F Díaz Acosta	4	6	7^{7}
4	(Argentina) L Midón	6	3	6
Q	(Brazil) J Pereira	4	6	4
(Argentina) JB Torres	1	7	4
(Argentina) LE Ambrogi	6	5	6
(Argentina) G Villanueva	4	6	6
Q	(Argentina) S de la Fuente	6	3	1
WC	(Brazil) Victor Braga	1	1
8	(Peru) JP Varillas	6	6

Second round
1	(Peru) G Bueno	6	6
Alt	(Argentina) L Ratti	2	2
(Argentina) H Casanova	5
5	(Argentina) F Díaz Acosta	2^{r}
4	(Argentina) L Midón	2	6	7
(Argentina) LE Ambrogi	6	3	5
(Argentina) G Villanueva	3	5
8	(Peru) JP Varillas	6	7

Quarterfinals
1	(Peru) G Bueno	3	6	7^{7}
(Argentina) H Casanova	6	2	6^{5}
4	(Argentina) L Midón	7^{8}	6
8	(Peru) JP Varillas	6^{6}	4

Semifinals
1	(Peru) G Bueno	5	6	6
4	(Argentina) L Midón	7	3	1

=== Bottom half ===
First round
7	(Argentina) GI Justo	6	6
Q	(Brazil) Victor Hugo Remondy Pagotto	2	1
(Argentina) JM La Serna	6	6
WC	(Brazil) Enzo Camargo Lima	2	2
Alt	(Switzerland) J Nikles	6	6
(Argentina) V Aboian	1	4
(Brazil) G Heide	6	6
3	(Brazil) JL Reis da Silva	2	1
6	(Brazil) P Boscardin Dias	6	6
Alt	(Argentina) Lorenzo Joaquín Rodríguez	3	3
(Bolivia) M Dellien	1	7^{7}	6
WC	(Brazil) PA Saraiva dos Santos	6	6^{4}	2
(Brazil) P Sakamoto	6	6
(Brazil) João Eduardo Schiessl	4	4
Q	(Argentina) F Ribero	4	6	3
2	(Ecuador) Á Guillén Meza	6	3	6

Second round
7	(Argentina) GI Justo	6	6
(Argentina) JM La Serna	4	3
Alt	(Switzerland) J Nikles	2	4
(Brazil) G Heide	6	6
6	(Brazil) P Boscardin Dias	6	6
(Bolivia) M Dellien	3	3
(Brazil) P Sakamoto	7	5	3
2	(Ecuador) Á Guillén Meza	5	7	6

Quarterfinals
7	(Argentina) GI Justo	3	4
(Brazil) G Heide	6	6
6	(Brazil) P Boscardin Dias	6	6
2	(Ecuador) Á Guillén Meza	2	4

Semifinals
(Brazil) G Heide	7^{7}	6
6	(Brazil) P Boscardin Dias	6^{1}	2
