= 2022 São Léo Open – Singles =

Singles
- 2022 São Léo Open

Final
- Champion: (Peru) Juan Pablo Varillas
- Runner-up: (Argentina) Facundo Bagnis
- Score: 7–6^{(7–5)}, 4–6, 6–4

Events
Singles	Doubles
← 2012 ·	São Léo Open	· 2024 →

This was the third edition of the tournament as an ATP Challenger Tour event and the first edition since 2012.

Juan Pablo Varillas won the title after defeating Facundo Bagnis 7–6^{(7–5)}, 4–6, 6–4 in the final.

== Seeds ==
1. (Argentina) Facundo Bagnis (final)
2. (Peru) Juan Pablo Varillas (champion)
3. (Italy) Franco Agamenone (first round, retired)
4. (Brazil) Felipe Meligeni Alves (semifinals)
5. (Argentina) Renzo Olivo (first round)
6. (Argentina) Facundo Díaz Acosta (second round)
7. (Brazil) Matheus Pucinelli de Almeida (first round)
8. (Portugal) Gastão Elias (first round)

== Draw ==
=== Key ===
- Q = Qualifier
- WC = Wild card
- LL = Lucky loser
- Alt = Alternate
- SE = Special exempt
- PR = Protected ranking
- ITF = ITF entry
- JE = Junior exempt
- w/o = Walkover
- r = Retired
- d = Defaulted
- SR = Special ranking

=== Finals ===
Semifinals
1	(Argentina) Facundo Bagnis	6^{4}	6	6
4	(Brazil) Felipe Meligeni Alves	7^{7}	3	2
Alt	(Brazil) Thiago Seyboth Wild	4	2
2	(Peru) Juan Pablo Varillas	6	6

Final
1	(Argentina) Facundo Bagnis	6^{5}	6	4
2	(Peru) Juan Pablo Varillas	7^{7}	4	6

=== Top half ===
First round
1	(Argentina) F Bagnis	6	6
(Brazil) P Boscardin Dias	4	2
Q	(Sweden) L Borg	1	2
WC	(Brazil) G Heide	6	6
WC	(Brazil) J Fonseca	6	7^{7}
(Argentina) TA Tirante	4	6^{2}
(Argentina) M Navone	6	6
8	(Portugal) G Elias	4	4
4	(Brazil) F Meligeni Alves	3	7	6
(Argentina) JB Torres	6	5	1
(Argentina) GA Olivieri	5	4
(Peru) N Álvarez	7	6
(Argentina) F Comesaña	2	2
(Argentina) RA Burruchaga	6	6
(Argentina) G Villanueva	3	3
6	(Argentina) F Díaz Acosta	6	6

Second round
1	(Argentina) F Bagnis	7^{7}	6
WC	(Brazil) G Heide	6^{4}	3
WC	(Brazil) J Fonseca	6	1	7^{11}
(Argentina) M Navone	3	6	6^{9}
4	(Brazil) F Meligeni Alves	6	6
(Peru) N Álvarez	3	2
(Argentina) RA Burruchaga	1	6	6
6	(Argentina) F Díaz Acosta	6	3	0

Quarterfinals
1	(Argentina) F Bagnis	6	6
WC	(Brazil) J Fonseca	3	4
4	(Brazil) F Meligeni Alves	6	4	6
(Argentina) RA Burruchaga	1	6	3

Semifinals
1	(Argentina) F Bagnis	6^{4}	6	6
4	(Brazil) F Meligeni Alves	7^{7}	3	2

=== Bottom half ===
First round
5	(Argentina) R Olivo	4	6	3
Q	(Brazil) M Alves	6	4	6
Alt	(Brazil) JL Reis da Silva	6	6
Q	(Argentina) JP Paz	3	2
(Dominican Republic) N Hardt	6	3	6
Q	(Brazil) Wilson Leite	4	6	2
Alt	(Brazil) T Seyboth Wild	7^{8}	5
3	(Italy) F Agamenone	6^{6}	1^{r}
7/WC	(Brazil) M Pucinelli de Almeida	5	2
(Brazil) D Dutra da Silva	7	6
(Portugal) J Domingues	7^{7}	7
Q	(Netherlands) M Houkes	6^{0}	5
Q	(Switzerland) D Wenger	2	6^{5}
(Chile) G Lama	6	7^{7}
LL	(Brazil) E Ribeiro	1	6	3
2	(Peru) JP Varillas	6	4	6

Second round
Q	(Brazil) M Alves	6^{7}	1
Alt	(Brazil) JL Reis da Silva	7^{9}	6
(Dominican Republic) N Hardt	1	2
Alt	(Brazil) T Seyboth Wild	6	6
(Brazil) D Dutra da Silva	2	6	6
(Portugal) J Domingues	6	4	4
(Chile) G Lama	6^{2}	3
2	(Peru) JP Varillas	7^{7}	6

Quarterfinals
Alt	(Brazil) JL Reis da Silva	2	5
Alt	(Brazil) T Seyboth Wild	6	7
(Brazil) D Dutra da Silva	6^{3}	7^{7}	6^{2}
2	(Peru) JP Varillas	7^{7}	6^{4}	7^{7}

Semifinals
Alt	(Brazil) T Seyboth Wild	4	2
2	(Peru) JP Varillas	6	6
