= 2021 Rio Tennis Classic =

- Date: 13–19 December
- Edition: 2nd
- Draw: 32S / 16D
- Surface: Hard
- Location: Rio de Janeiro, Brazil

Champions

Singles
- (Japan) Kaichi Uchida

Doubles
- (Brazil) Orlando Luz / (Brazil) Rafael Matos
← 2017 ·	Rio Tennis Classic	· 2022 →

The 2021 Rio Tennis Classic was a professional tennis tournament played on hard courts. It was the second edition of the tournament which was part of the 2021 ATP Challenger Tour. It took place in Rio de Janeiro, Brazil from 13 to 19 December 2021.

== Singles main-draw entrants ==
=== Seeds ===
Country	Player	Rank^{1}	Seed
BRA	Thiago Seyboth Wild	131	1
ARG	Nicolás Kicker	230	2
ARG	Juan Pablo Ficovich	232	3
~~BRA~~	~~Matheus Pucinelli de Almeida~~	~~286~~	~~4~~
DOM	Roberto Cid Subervi	296	5
BRA	Orlando Luz	300	6
SRB	Peđa Krstin	311	7
JPN	Kaichi Uchida	316	8

- ^{1} Rankings are as of 6 December 2021.

=== Other entrants ===
The following players received wildcards into the singles main draw:

- (Brazil) Gabriel Décamps
- (Brazil) Lorenzo Esquici
- (Brazil) Wilson Leite

The following player received entry into the singles main draw using a protected ranking:

- (Brazil) Guilherme Clezar

The following player received entry into the singles main draw as a special exempt:

- (Brazil) Igor Marcondes

The following player received entry into the singles main draw as an alternate:

- (Brazil) Mateus Alves

The following players received entry from the qualifying draw:

- (Colombia) Nicolás Barrientos
- (Switzerland) Luca Castelnuovo
- (Brazil) Rafael Matos
- (Brazil) José Pereira

The following players received entry as lucky losers:

- (United States) Roy Smith
- (Bolivia) Federico Zeballos

== Champions ==
=== Singles ===
- (Japan) Kaichi Uchida def. (Spain) Nicolás Álvarez Varona 3–6, 6–3, 7–6^{(7–3)}.

=== Doubles ===
- (Brazil) Orlando Luz / (Brazil) Rafael Matos def. (United States) James Cerretani / (Brazil) Fernando Romboli 6–3, 7–6^{(7–2)}.
