= 2011 São Léo Open – Doubles =

Doubles
- 2011 São Léo Open

Final
- Champions: (Brazil) Franco Ferreiro (Spain) Rubén Ramírez Hidalgo
- Runners-up: (Portugal) Gastão Elias (Portugal) Frederico Gil
- Score: 6–7^{(4–7)}, 6–3, [11–9]

Events
Singles	Doubles
← 2010 ·	São Léo Open	· 2012 →

This is the first edition of the tournament.
Franco Ferreiro and Rubén Ramírez Hidalgo won the title, defeating Gastão Elias and Frederico Gil 6–7^{(4–7)}, 6–3, [11–9] in the final.

== Seeds ==
1. (Brazil) Franco Ferreiro / (Spain) Rubén Ramírez Hidalgo (champions)
2. (Spain) Daniel Muñoz-de la Nava / (Czech Republic) Jaroslav Pospíšil (first round)
3. (Brazil) Rodrigo Grilli / (Brazil) André Miele (semifinals)
4. (Argentina) Andrés Molteni / (Argentina) Guido Pella (first round)

== Draw ==
=== Key ===
- Q = Qualifier
- WC = Wild card
- LL = Lucky loser
- Alt = Alternate
- SE = Special exempt
- PR = Protected ranking
- ITF = ITF entry
- JE = Junior exempt
- w/o = Walkover
- r = Retired
- d = Defaulted
- SR = Special ranking

=== Draw ===
First round
1	(Brazil) F Ferreiro (Spain) R Ramírez Hidalgo	6	6
(Brazil) M Demoliner (Brazil) C Zampieri	3	4
WC	(Sweden) C Lindell (Brazil) J Pereira	4	1
(Brazil) T Fernandes (Brazil) J Silva	6	6
4	(Argentina) A Molteni (Argentina) Guido Pella	3	4
(Argentina) P Galdón (Argentina) Marco Trungelliti	6	6
(Serbia) N Ćirić (Montenegro) G Tošić	3	2
WC	(Brazil) Guilherme Clézar (Brazil) Bruno Sant'anna	6	6
(Argentina) M Alund (Argentina) JP Brzezicki	4	2
(United States) W Odesnik (Brazil) F Romboli	6	6
PR	(Slovakia) P Červenák (Brazil) Márcio Torres	6	3	[8]
3	(Brazil) R Grilli (Brazil) A Miele	3	6	[10]
WC	(Brazil) L Engel (Brazil) A Ghem	4	3
(Argentina) F Argüello (Uruguay) M Felder	6	6
(Portugal) G Elias (Portugal) F Gil	6	6
2	(Spain) D Muñoz-de la Nava (Czech Republic) J Pospíšil	1	4

Quarterfinals
1	(Brazil) F Ferreiro (Spain) R Ramírez Hidalgo	6	6
(Brazil) T Fernandes (Brazil) J Silva	4	2
(Argentina) P Galdón (Argentina) M Trungelliti
WC	(Brazil) G Clézar (Brazil) B Sant'anna	w/o
(United States) W Odesnik (Brazil) F Romboli	4	4
3	(Brazil) R Grilli (Brazil) A Miele	6	6
(Argentina) F Argüello (Uruguay) M Felder	2	3
(Portugal) G Elias (Portugal) F Gil	6	6

Semifinals
1	(Brazil) F Ferreiro (Spain) R Ramírez Hidalgo	6	6
WC	(Brazil) G Clézar (Brazil) B Sant'anna	4	4
3	(Brazil) R Grilli (Brazil) A Miele	1	4
(Portugal) G Elias (Portugal) F Gil	6	6

Final
1	(Brazil) F Ferreiro (Spain) R Ramírez Hidalgo	6^{4}	6	[11]
(Portugal) G Elias (Portugal) F Gil	7^{7}	3	[9]
