= 2026 Campeonato Internacional de Tênis de Campinas – Doubles =

Doubles
- 2026 Campeonato Internacional de Tênis de Campinas

Final
- Champions: (Spain) Nicolás Álvarez Varona (Spain) Mario Mansilla Díez
- Runners-up: (Argentina) Mariano Kestelboim (Brazil) Marcelo Zormann
- Score: 3–6, 6–1, [10–8]

Events
Singles	Doubles
- Campeonato Internacional de Tênis de Campinas

Mariano Kestelboim and Gonzalo Villanueva were the defending champions but chose to defend their title with different partners. Kestelboim partnered Marcelo Zormann but lost in the final to Nicolás Álvarez Varona and Mario Mansilla Díez. Villanueva partnered Ignacio Carou but lost in the first round to Valerio Aboian and Santiago de la Fuente.

Álvarez Varona and Mansilla Díez won the title after defeating Kestelboim and Zormann 3–6, 6–1, [10–8] in the final.

== Seeds ==
1. (Argentina) Mariano Kestelboim / (Brazil) Marcelo Zormann (final)
2. (Brazil) Marcelo Demoliner / (Brazil) Bruno Oliveira (first round)
3. (Uruguay) Ignacio Carou / (Argentina) Gonzalo Villanueva (first round)
4. (Brazil) Gustavo Heide / (Brazil) Eduardo Ribeiro (first round)

== Draw ==
Key

- Q = Qualifier
- WC = Wild card
- LL = Lucky loser
- Alt = Alternate
- ITF = ITF entry
- PR = Protected ranking
- SR = Special ranking
- SE = Special exempt
- JE = Junior exempt
- JR = Junior Accelerator Programme entrant
- CO = College Accelerator Programme entrant
- NG = Next Gen Accelerator Program entrant
- w/o = Walkover
- r = Retired
- d = Defaulted

First round
1	(Argentina) M Kestelboim (Brazil) M Zormann	6	7
(Brazil) L Britto (Brazil) PA Saraiva dos Santos	2	5
WC	(Brazil) Enzo Camargo Lima (Brazil) Pietro Gava	4	3
(Argentina) Lorenzo Joaquín Rodríguez (Brazil) Gabriel Roveri Sidney	6	6
3	(Uruguay) I Carou (Argentina) G Villanueva	6^{4}	4
Alt	(Argentina) V Aboian (Argentina) S de la Fuente	7^{7}	6
WC	(Brazil) Breno Braga (Brazil) Victor Braga	1	3
(Argentina) Thiago Cigarrán (Argentina) F Díaz Acosta	6	6
(Brazil) JVC Loureiro (Brazil) Natan Rodrigues	6^{5}	6	[10]
(Brazil) P Boscardin Dias (Brazil) JL Reis da Silva	7^{7}	4	[4]
(Spain) N Álvarez Varona (Spain) M Mansilla Díez	7^{7}	6
4	(Brazil) G Heide (Brazil) E Ribeiro	6^{3}	4
(Argentina) Valentín Basel (Argentina) F Ribero	4	7^{7}	[10]
(Argentina) LE Ambrogi (Argentina) H Casanova	6	6^{4}	[3]
(Peru) A Huertas del Pino (Peru) C Huertas del Pino	6	6
2	(Brazil) M Demoliner (Brazil) Bruno Oliveira	2	3

Quarterfinals
1	(Argentina) M Kestelboim (Brazil) M Zormann	7^{7}	6
(Argentina) LJ Rodríguez (Brazil) G Roveri Sidney	6^{4}	1
Alt	(Argentina) V Aboian (Argentina) S de la Fuente	w/o
(Argentina) T Cigarrán (Argentina) F Díaz Acosta
(Brazil) JVC Loureiro (Brazil) N Rodrigues	4	1
(Spain) N Álvarez Varona (Spain) M Mansilla Díez	6	6
(Argentina) V Basel (Argentina) F Ribero	4	7^{7}	[17]
(Peru) A Huertas del Pino (Peru) C Huertas del Pino	6	6^{2}	[15]

Semifinals
1	(Argentina) M Kestelboim (Brazil) M Zormann	6	6
Alt	(Argentina) V Aboian (Argentina) S de la Fuente	3	2
(Spain) N Álvarez Varona (Spain) M Mansilla Díez	7^{7}	6
(Argentina) V Basel (Argentina) F Ribero	6^{4}	1

Final
1	(Argentina) M Kestelboim (Brazil) M Zormann	6	1	[8]
(Spain) N Álvarez Varona (Spain) M Mansilla Díez	3	6	[10]
