= 2011 São Léo Open =

- Date: 31 October – 6 November
- Edition: 1st
- Location: São Leopoldo, Brazil

Champions

Singles
- (Argentina) Leonardo Mayer

Doubles
- (Brazil) Franco Ferreiro / (Spain) Rubén Ramírez Hidalgo
São Léo Open	· 2012 →

The 2011 São Léo Open was a professional tennis tournament played on clay courts. It was the first edition of the tournament which is part of the 2011 ATP Challenger Tour. It took place in São Leopoldo, Brazil between 31 October and 6 November 2011.

== ATP entrants ==
=== Seeds ===
Country	Player	Rank^{1}	Seed
POR	Rui Machado	80	1
ARG	Diego Junqueira	91	2
POR	Frederico Gil	96	3
ARG	Leonardo Mayer	99	4
BRA	Ricardo Mello	109	5
ESP	Rubén Ramírez Hidalgo	130	6
ARG	Máximo González	131	7
USA	Wayne Odesnik	136	8

- ^{1} Rankings are as of October 24, 2011.

=== Other entrants ===
The following players received wildcards into the singles main draw:

- (Brazil) Guilherme Clézar
- (Brazil) Franco Ferreiro
- (Brazil) André Ghem
- (Brazil) Bruno Sant'anna

The following players received entry as a special exempt into the singles main draw:

- (Brazil) Thiago Alves

The following players received entry as an alternate into the singles main draw:

- (Argentina) Martín Alund

The following players received entry from the qualifying draw:

- (Brazil) Marcelo Demoliner
- (Argentina) Pablo Galdón
- (Brazil) André Miele
- (Argentina) Marco Trungelliti

== Champions ==
=== Singles ===
(Argentina) Leonardo Mayer def. (Serbia) Nikola Ćirić, 7–5, 7–6^{(7–1)}

=== Doubles ===
(Brazil) Franco Ferreiro / (Spain) Rubén Ramírez Hidalgo def. (Portugal) Gastão Elias / (Portugal) Frederico Gil, 6–7^{(4–7)}, 6–3, [11–9]
