= 2012 São Léo Open – Doubles =

Doubles
- 2012 São Léo Open

Final
- Champions: (Brazil) Fabiano de Paula (Brazil) Júlio Silva
- Runners-up: (Uruguay) Ariel Behar (Argentina) Horacio Zeballos
- Score: 6–1, 7–6^{(7–5)}

Events
Singles	Doubles
← 2011 ·	São Léo Open	· 2022 →

Franco Ferreiro and Rubén Ramírez Hidalgo were the defending champions but decided not to participate.
Fabiano de Paula and Júlio Silva defeated Ariel Behar and Horacio Zeballos 6–1, 7–6^{(7–5)} in the final.

== Seeds ==
1. (Uruguay) Ariel Behar / (Argentina) Horacio Zeballos (final)
2. (Brazil) Guilherme Clezar / (Italy) Alessandro Motti (quarterfinals)
3. (Uruguay) Marcel Felder / (Croatia) Franko Škugor (semifinals)
4. (Serbia) Boris Pašanski / (Croatia) Antonio Veić (first round)

== Draw ==
=== Key ===
- Q = Qualifier
- WC = Wild card
- LL = Lucky loser
- Alt = Alternate
- SE = Special exempt
- PR = Protected ranking
- ITF = ITF entry
- JE = Junior exempt
- w/o = Walkover
- r = Retired
- d = Defaulted
- SR = Special ranking

=== Draw ===
First round
1	(Uruguay) A Behar (Argentina) H Zeballos	3	6	[10]
Alt	(Argentina) S Prieto (Argentina) D Schwartzman	6	1	[6]
(Brazil) R Grilli (Brazil) Diego Matos	6	7
WC	(Portugal) G Elias (Brazil) J Oncins	3	5
4	(Serbia) B Pašanski (Croatia) A Veić	7^{7}	4	[7]
(Brazil) F Neis (Brazil) JP Sorgi	6^{2}	6	[10]
(Argentina) Leandro Migani (Argentina) José María Paniagua	1	2
(Chile) H Podlipnik (Germany) A Satschko	6	6
(Italy) Enrico Becuzzi (Bosnia and Herzegovina) T Brkić	w/o
(Brazil) Wilson Leite (Brazil) J Souza
WC	(Austria) W Eschauer (Austria) A Haider-Maurer	3	2
3	(Uruguay) M Felder (Croatia) F Škugor	6	6
(Argentina) G Andreozzi (Argentina) A Velotti	1	4
(Brazil) F de Paula (Brazil) J Silva	6	6
WC	(Brazil) Gabriel Friedrich (Brazil) J Pereira	3	6^{3}
2	(Brazil) G Clezar (Italy) A Motti	6	7^{7}

Quarterfinals
1	(Uruguay) A Behar (Argentina) H Zeballos	6	6
(Brazil) R Grilli (Brazil) D Matos	4	2
(Brazil) F Neis (Brazil) JP Sorgi	7	4	[10]
(Chile) H Podlipnik (Germany) A Satschko	5	6	[8]
(Italy) E Becuzzi (Bosnia and Herzegovina) T Brkić	4	6^{4}
3	(Uruguay) M Felder (Croatia) F Škugor	6	7^{7}
(Brazil) F de Paula (Brazil) J Silva	6	6^{2}	[10]
2	(Brazil) G Clezar (Italy) A Motti	3	7^{7}	[8]

Semifinals
1	(Uruguay) A Behar (Argentina) H Zeballos	6	7^{7}
(Brazil) F Neis (Brazil) JP Sorgi	2	6^{2}
3	(Uruguay) M Felder (Croatia) F Škugor	6^{4}	7	[6]
(Brazil) F de Paula (Brazil) J Silva	7^{7}	5	[10]

Final
1	(Uruguay) A Behar (Argentina) H Zeballos	1	6^{5}
(Brazil) F de Paula (Brazil) J Silva	6	7^{7}
