= 2024 São Léo Open – Doubles =

Doubles
- 2024 São Léo Open

Final
- Champions: (Brazil) Marcelo Demoliner (Brazil) Orlando Luz
- Runners-up: (Canada) Liam Draxl (Italy) Alexander Weis
- Score: 7–5, 3–6, [10–8]

Events
Singles	Doubles
- São Léo Open

Guido Andreozzi and Guillermo Durán were the defending champions but chose not to defend their title.

Marcelo Demoliner and Orlando Luz won the title after defeating Liam Draxl and Alexander Weis 7–5, 3–6, [10–8] in the final.

== Seeds ==
1. (Bolivia) Boris Arias / (Bolivia) Federico Zeballos (quarterfinals)
2. (Brazil) Marcelo Demoliner / (Brazil) Orlando Luz (champions)
3. (Brazil) Fernando Romboli / (Brazil) Marcelo Zormann (semifinals)
4. (United Kingdom) Scott Duncan / (Canada) Kelsey Stevenson (first round)

== Draw ==
Key

- Q = Qualifier
- WC = Wild card
- LL = Lucky loser
- Alt = Alternate
- ITF = ITF entry
- PR = Protected ranking
- SR = Special ranking
- SE = Special exempt
- JE = Junior exempt
- JR = Junior Accelerator Programme entrant
- CO = College Accelerator Programme entrant
- NG = Next Gen Accelerator Program entrant
- w/o = Walkover
- r = Retired
- d = Defaulted

=== Draw ===
First round
1	(Bolivia) B Arias (Bolivia) F Zeballos	6	7^{7}
(Brazil) D Dutra da Silva (Brazil) P Sakamoto	2	6^{4}
(France) G Blancaneaux (France) E Couacaud	3
(Israel) D Cukierman (Peru) C Huertas del Pino	2^{r}
4	(United Kingdom) S Duncan (Canada) K Stevenson	3	4
(Canada) L Draxl (Italy) Alexander Weis	6	6
(Australia) A Taylor (Argentina) G Villanueva	6	7^{7}
Alt	(Peru) G Bueno (Ecuador) Á Guillén Meza	3	6^{4}
Alt	(Brazil) JL Reis da Silva (Argentina) JB Torres	7	6
(Argentina) GA Olivieri (Spain) C Sánchez Jover	5	3
WC	(Brazil) L Britto (Brazil) PA Saraiva dos Santos	3	2
3	(Brazil) F Romboli (Brazil) M Zormann	6	6
(Argentina) A Collarini (Argentina) R Olivo	6	6
(Portugal) G Oliveira (Japan) K Uchida	1	3
(Sweden) S Freund (Denmark) J Ingildsen	5	4
2	(Brazil) M Demoliner (Brazil) O Luz	7	6

Quarterfinals
1	(Bolivia) B Arias (Bolivia) F Zeballos	5	4
(France) G Blancaneaux (France) E Couacaud	7	6
(Canada) L Draxl (Italy) A Weis	6	6
(Australia) A Taylor (Argentina) G Villanueva	3	4
Alt	(Brazil) JL Reis da Silva (Argentina) JB Torres	5	0
3	(Brazil) F Romboli (Brazil) M Zormann	7	6
(Argentina) A Collarini (Argentina) R Olivo	3	6	[10]
2	(Brazil) M Demoliner (Brazil) O Luz	6	3	[12]

Semifinals
(France) G Blancaneaux (France) E Couacaud	7^{7}	1^{r}
(Canada) L Draxl (Italy) A Weis	6^{4}	1
3	(Brazil) F Romboli (Brazil) M Zormann	4	4
2	(Brazil) M Demoliner (Brazil) O Luz	6	6

Final
(Canada) L Draxl (Italy) A Weis	5	6	[8]
2	(Brazil) M Demoliner (Brazil) O Luz	7	3	[10]
