= 2011 São Léo Open – Singles =

Singles
- 2011 São Léo Open

Final
- Champion: (Argentina) Leonardo Mayer
- Runner-up: (Serbia) Nikola Ćirić
- Score: 7–5, 7–6^{(7–1)}

Events
Singles	Doubles
← 2010 ·	São Léo Open	· 2012 →

Leonardo Mayer won the first edition of the tournament 7–5, 7–6^{(7–1)} in the final against Nikola Ćirić.

== Seeds ==
1. (Portugal) Rui Machado (semifinals)
2. (Argentina) Diego Junqueira (first round)
3. (Portugal) Frederico Gil (first round)
4. (Argentina) Leonardo Mayer (champion)
5. (Brazil) Ricardo Mello (quarterfinals)
6. (Spain) Rubén Ramírez Hidalgo (quarterfinals)
7. (Argentina) Máximo González (second round)
8. (United States) Wayne Odesnik (quarterfinals)

== Draw ==
=== Key ===
- Q = Qualifier
- WC = Wild card
- LL = Lucky loser
- Alt = Alternate
- SE = Special exempt
- PR = Protected ranking
- ITF = ITF entry
- JE = Junior exempt
- w/o = Walkover
- r = Retired
- d = Defaulted
- SR = Special ranking

=== Finals ===
Semifinals
1	(Portugal) Rui Machado	4	4
4	(Argentina) Leonardo Mayer	6	6
(Argentina) Juan Pablo Brzezicki	6	6^{3}	1^{r}
(Serbia) Nikola Ćirić	4	7^{7}	3

Final
4	(Argentina) Leonardo Mayer	7	7^{7}
(Serbia) Nikola Ćirić	5	6^{1}

=== Top half ===
First round
1	(Portugal) R Machado	6	7^{7}
(Czech Republic) J Pospíšil	3	6^{2}
(Portugal) G Elias	6	6
SE	(Brazil) T Alves	2	4
Q	(Argentina) Marco Trungelliti	2	2
(Brazil) J Silva	6	6
(Argentina) A Molteni	3	3
8	(United States) W Odesnik	6	6
4	(Argentina) L Mayer	6^{3}	7	6
(Spain) D Muñoz-de la Nava	7^{7}	5	2
WC	(Brazil) G Clézar	6	6
Q	(Brazil) A Miele	2	0
WC	(Brazil) Bruno Sant'anna	6^{3}	3
(Uruguay) M Felder	7^{7}	6
(Brazil) F Romboli	3	1
5	(Brazil) R Mello	6	6

Second round
1	(Portugal) R Machado	6	6
(Portugal) G Elias	2	4
(Brazil) J Silva	4	2
8	(United States) W Odesnik	6	6
4	(Argentina) L Mayer	6	6^{6}	7^{9}
WC	(Brazil) G Clézar	4	7^{8}	6^{7}
(Uruguay) M Felder	5	4
5	(Brazil) R Mello	7	6

Quarterfinals
1	(Portugal) R Machado	6	6
8	(United States) W Odesnik	4	2
4	(Argentina) L Mayer	6	6
5	(Brazil) R Mello	2	4

Semifinals
1	(Portugal) R Machado	4	4
4	(Argentina) L Mayer	6	6

=== Bottom half ===
First round
7	(Argentina) M González	6^{6}	6	6
(Brazil) C Zampieri	7^{8}	2	3
(Russia) A Kuznetsov	6^{9}	0
WC	(Brazil) A Ghem	7^{11}	6
(Argentina) JP Brzezicki	6	6
WC	(Brazil) F Ferreiro	2	4
Q	(Argentina) P Galdón	6	6
3	(Portugal) F Gil	2	4
6	(Spain) R Ramírez Hidalgo	6	6
(Spain) I Navarro	3	4
(Argentina) F Argüello	6	3	6
(Slovakia) P Červenák	4	6	3
Q	(Brazil) M Demoliner	6^{5}	5
Alt	(Argentina) M Alund	7^{7}	7
(Serbia) N Ćirić	6	7^{7}
2	(Argentina) D Junqueira	2	6^{2}

Second round
7	(Argentina) M González	6^{7}	4
WC	(Brazil) A Ghem	7^{9}	6
(Argentina) JP Brzezicki	6	6
Q	(Argentina) P Galdón	4	1
6	(Spain) R Ramírez Hidalgo	7	7^{7}
(Argentina) F Argüello	5	6^{5}
Alt	(Argentina) M Alund	6	6^{5}	4
(Serbia) N Ćirić	2	7^{7}	6

Quarterfinals
WC	(Brazil) A Ghem	7^{7}	6^{0}	4
(Argentina) JP Brzezicki	6^{2}	7^{7}	6
6	(Spain) R Ramírez Hidalgo	4	5
(Serbia) N Ćirić	6	7

Semifinals
(Argentina) JP Brzezicki	6	6^{3}	1^{r}
(Serbia) N Ćirić	4	7^{7}	3
