= 2012 São Léo Open – Singles =

Singles
- 2012 São Léo Open

Final
- Champion: (Argentina) Horacio Zeballos
- Runner-up: (Chile) Paul Capdeville
- Score: 3–6, 7–5, 7–6^{(7–2)}

Events
Singles	Doubles
← 2011 ·	São Léo Open	· 2022 →

Leonardo Mayer was the defending champion but decided not to participate.
Horacio Zeballos defeated Paul Capdeville 3–6, 7–5, 7–6^{(7–2)} in the final.

== Seeds ==
1. (Austria) Andreas Haider-Maurer (second round)
2. (Slovenia) Blaž Kavčič (semifinals)
3. (Argentina) Horacio Zeballos (champion)
4. (Brazil) Rogério Dutra da Silva (quarterfinals)
5. (Portugal) Gastão Elias (quarterfinals)
6. (Brazil) João Souza (first round)
7. (Croatia) Antonio Veić (second round)
8. (Chile) Paul Capdeville (final)

== Draw ==
=== Key ===
- Q = Qualifier
- WC = Wild card
- LL = Lucky loser
- Alt = Alternate
- SE = Special exempt
- PR = Protected ranking
- ITF = ITF entry
- JE = Junior exempt
- w/o = Walkover
- r = Retired
- d = Defaulted
- SR = Special ranking

=== Finals ===
Semifinals
8	(Chile) Paul Capdeville	6	6
(Argentina) Diego Schwartzman	1	1
3	(Argentina) Horacio Zeballos	5	6	6
2	(Slovenia) Blaž Kavčič	7	3	2

Final
8	(Chile) Paul Capdeville	6	5	6^{2}
3	(Argentina) Horacio Zeballos	3	7	7^{7}

=== Top half ===
First round
1	(Austria) A Haider-Maurer	6	6
(Uruguay) M Felder	3	2
(Italy) Enrico Becuzzi	0	1
Q	(Bosnia and Herzegovina) T Brkić	6	6
WC	(Brazil) JP Sorgi	7	6
(Chile) H Podlipnik	5	1
(Argentina) A Collarini	2	3
8	(Chile) P Capdeville	6	6
4	(Brazil) R Dutra da Silva	6^{6}	6	6
Q	(Germany) A Satschko	7^{8}	0	3
Q	(Brazil) Wilson Leite	7	6
(Brazil) A Ghem	5	4
(Argentina) Leandro Migani	2	1
(Argentina) P Galdón	6	6
(Argentina) D Schwartzman	7^{7}	6
6	(Brazil) J Souza	6^{3}	3

Second round
1	(Austria) A Haider-Maurer	6	1	6^{1}
Q	(Bosnia and Herzegovina) T Brkić	1	6	7^{7}
WC	(Brazil) JP Sorgi	3	6^{6}
8	(Chile) P Capdeville	6	7^{8}
4	(Brazil) R Dutra da Silva	5	7	6
Q	(Brazil) W Leite	7	5	4
(Argentina) P Galdón	1	1
(Argentina) D Schwartzman	6	6

Quarterfinals
Q	(Bosnia and Herzegovina) T Brkić	2	3
8	(Chile) P Capdeville	6	6
4	(Brazil) R Dutra da Silva	2	6^{2}
(Argentina) D Schwartzman	6	7^{7}

Semifinals
8	(Chile) P Capdeville	6	6
(Argentina) D Schwartzman	1	1

=== Bottom half ===
First round
7	(Croatia) A Veić	6	6
WC	(Brazil) Gabriel Friedrich	3	1
(Brazil) F de Paula	7	6
(Brazil) J Pereira	5	3
(Serbia) B Pašanski	6	6
(Italy) A Motti	1	4
Q	(Brazil) Diego Matos	2	2
3	(Argentina) H Zeballos	6	6
5	(Portugal) G Elias	6	6
WC	(Brazil) Stefano Blatt	1	0
(Argentina) G Andreozzi	2	7	6^{2}
(Argentina) A Velotti	6	5	7^{7}
WC	(Brazil) F Neis	5	3
(Brazil) G Clezar	7	6
(Brazil) J Silva	4	6^{6}
2	(Slovenia) B Kavčič	6	7^{8}

Second round
7	(Croatia) A Veić	3	6^{7}
(Brazil) F de Paula	6	7^{9}
(Serbia) B Pašanski	4	7^{7}	0
3	(Argentina) H Zeballos	6	6^{5}	6
5	(Portugal) G Elias	6	6
(Argentina) A Velotti	1	1
(Brazil) G Clezar	4	6	3
2	(Slovenia) B Kavčič	6	3	6

Quarterfinals
(Brazil) F de Paula	1	2
3	(Argentina) H Zeballos	6	6
5	(Portugal) G Elias	4	2
2	(Slovenia) B Kavčič	6	6

Semifinals
3	(Argentina) H Zeballos	5	6	6
2	(Slovenia) B Kavčič	7	3	2
