= 2022 Geneva Open – Singles =

Singles
- 2022 Geneva Open

Final
- Champion: (Norway) Casper Ruud
- Runner-up: (Portugal) João Sousa
- Score: 7–6^{(7–3)}, 4–6, 7–6^{(7–1)}

Details
- Draw: 28 (4 Q / 3 WC )
- Seeds: 8

Events
Singles	Doubles
- Geneva Open

Defending champion Casper Ruud defeated João Sousa in the final, 7–6^{(7–3)}, 4–6, 7–6^{(7–1)} to win the singles tennis title at the 2022 Geneva Open.

== Seeds ==
The top four seeds receive a bye into the second round.

1. Daniil Medvedev (second round)
2. (Norway) Casper Ruud (champion)
3. (Canada) Denis Shapovalov (second round)
4. (United States) Reilly Opelka (semifinals)
5. (Georgia (country)) Nikoloz Basilashvili (second round)
6. (United States) Tommy Paul (first round)
7. (Argentina) Federico Delbonis (second round)
8. (Kazakhstan) Alexander Bublik (first round)

== Draw ==
Key

- Q = Qualifier
- WC = Wild card
- LL = Lucky loser
- Alt = Alternate
- ITF = ITF entry
- PR = Protected ranking
- SR = Special ranking
- SE = Special exempt
- JE = Junior exempt
- JR = Junior Accelerator Programme entrant
- CO = College Accelerator Programme entrant
- NG = Next Gen Accelerator Program entrant
- w/o = Walkover
- r = Retired
- d = Defaulted

=== Finals ===
Semifinals
(France) Richard Gasquet	2	2
(Portugal) João Sousa	6	6
4	(United States) Reilly Opelka	6^{2}	5
2	(Norway) Casper Ruud	7^{7}	7

Final
(Portugal) João Sousa	6^{3}	6	6^{1}
2	(Norway) Casper Ruud	7^{7}	4	7^{7}

=== Top half ===
First round
(France) R Gasquet	6	6
(Australia) J Millman	3	1
(Austria) D Thiem	3	4
Q	(Italy) M Cecchinato	6	6
(Poland) K Majchrzak	6	6^{4}	6
8	(Kazakhstan) A Bublik	1	7^{7}	3
I Ivashka	4	6	6
(United States) M Giron	6	3	2
(Spain) P Andújar	1	4
(Portugal) J Sousa	6	6
Q	(Argentina) F Bagnis	4	0^{r}
5	(Georgia (country)) N Basilashvili	6	0

Second round
1/WC	D Medvedev	2	6^{5}
(France) R Gasquet	6	7^{7}
Q	(Italy) M Cecchinato	2	3
(Poland) K Majchrzak	6	6
3	(Canada) D Shapovalov	4	7^{7}	3
I Ivashka	6	6^{2}	6
(Portugal) J Sousa	6	6
5	(Georgia (country)) N Basilashvili	4	3

Quarterfinals
(France) R Gasquet	6	6
(Poland) K Majchrzak	2	4
I Ivashka	5	5
(Portugal) J Sousa	7	7

Semifinals
(France) R Gasquet	2	2
(Portugal) J Sousa	6	6

=== Bottom half ===
First round
6	(United States) T Paul	5	7^{7}	4
(Netherlands) T Griekspoor	7	6^{3}	6
WC	(Switzerland) L Riedi	7	6^{3}	5
Q	(Switzerland) J Nikles	5	7^{7}	7
(Spain) A Ramos Viñolas	6^{5}	4
Q	(Australia) C O'Connell	7^{7}	6
7	(Argentina) F Delbonis	6	6
WC	(Lithuania) R Berankis	4	4
(Australia) T Kokkinakis	6	6
(Italy) F Fognini	4	3
(France) B Paire	7	5	6
(Finland) E Ruusuvuori	5	7	4

Second round
(Netherlands) T Griekspoor	6	7
Q	(Switzerland) J Nikles	3	5
Q	(Australia) C O'Connell	3	5
4	(United States) R Opelka	6	7
7	(Argentina) F Delbonis	6	5	5
(Australia) T Kokkinakis	1	7	7
(France) B Paire	3	1
2	(Norway) C Ruud	6	6

Quarterfinals
(Netherlands) T Griekspoor	4	6	3
4	(United States) R Opelka	6	3	6
(Australia) T Kokkinakis	4	6^{3}
2	(Norway) C Ruud	6	7^{7}

Semifinals
4	(United States) R Opelka	6^{2}	5
2	(Norway) C Ruud	7^{7}	7

== Qualifying ==
=== Seeds ===
1. (Argentina) Facundo Bagnis (qualified)
2. (Switzerland) Henri Laaksonen (first round)
3. (Germany) Peter Gojowczyk (first round)
4. (Italy) Marco Cecchinato (qualified)
5. (Australia) Christopher O'Connell (qualified)
6. (Uruguay) Pablo Cuevas (qualifying competition)
7. (Ukraine) Vitaliy Sachko (qualifying competition)
8. (Czech Republic) Lukáš Rosol (qualifying competition)

=== Qualifiers ===
1. (Argentina) Facundo Bagnis
2. (Australia) Christopher O'Connell
3. (Switzerland) Johan Nikles
4. (Italy) Marco Cecchinato

=== Qualifying draw ===
==== First qualifier ====
First round
1	(Argentina) Facundo Bagnis	4	6	6
(Slovakia) Lukáš Klein	6	3	2
Alt	(Germany) Lucas Gerch	6^{1}	3
7	(Ukraine) Vitaliy Sachko	7^{7}	6

Qualifying competition
1	(Argentina) Facundo Bagnis	6	6
7	(Ukraine) Vitaliy Sachko	2	3

==== Second qualifier ====
First round
2	(Switzerland) Henri Laaksonen	4	3
(Lebanon) Benjamin Hassan	6	6
(Portugal) Gonçalo Oliveira	6^{3}	4
5	(Australia) Christopher O'Connell	7^{7}	6

Qualifying competition
(Lebanon) Benjamin Hassan	6^{2}	4
5	(Australia) Christopher O'Connell	7^{7}	6

==== Third qualifier ====
First round
3	(Germany) Peter Gojowczyk	3	3
(Switzerland) Johan Nikles	6	6
WC	(Switzerland) Jakub Paul	2	3
8	(Czech Republic) Lukáš Rosol	6	6

Qualifying competition
(Switzerland) Johan Nikles	6	6
8	(Czech Republic) Lukáš Rosol	4	4

==== Fourth qualifier ====
First round
4	(Italy) Marco Cecchinato	6	6
(Germany) Julian Lenz	3	2
WC	(Switzerland) Damien Wenger	4	2
6	(Uruguay) Pablo Cuevas	6	6

Qualifying competition
4	(Italy) Marco Cecchinato	6	6
6	(Uruguay) Pablo Cuevas	1	3
