= 2024 Kozerki Open – Singles =

Singles
- 2024 Kozerki Open

Final
- Champion: (Switzerland) Marc-Andrea Hüsler
- Runner-up: (Czech Republic) Vít Kopřiva
- Score: 6–1, 6–4

Events
Singles	Doubles
← 2023 ·	Kozerki Open	· 2025 →

Jesper de Jong was the defending champion but chose not to defend his title.

Marc-Andrea Hüsler won the title after defeating Vít Kopřiva 6–1, 6–4 in the final.

== Seeds ==
1. (Czech Republic) Vít Kopřiva (final)
2. (Denmark) August Holmgren (first round)
3. (Poland) Maks Kaśnikowski (first round)
4. (Switzerland) Dominic Stricker (quarterfinals)
5. (Kazakhstan) Timofey Skatov (first round)
6. (Switzerland) Marc-Andrea Hüsler (champion)
7. (Belgium) Joris De Loore (withdrew)
8. (France) Antoine Escoffier (semifinals)

== Draw ==
=== Key ===
- Q = Qualifier
- WC = Wild card
- LL = Lucky loser
- Alt = Alternate
- SE = Special exempt
- PR = Protected ranking
- ITF = ITF entry
- JE = Junior exempt
- w/o = Walkover
- r = Retired
- d = Defaulted
- SR = Special ranking

=== Finals ===
Semifinals
1	(Czech Republic) Vít Kopřiva	6	3	6
(Syria) Hazem Naw	4	6	1
6	(Switzerland) Marc-Andrea Hüsler	6	3	6
8	(France) Antoine Escoffier	1	6	3

Final
1	(Czech Republic) Vít Kopřiva	1	4
6	(Switzerland) Marc-Andrea Hüsler	6	6

=== Top half ===
First round
1	(Czech Republic) V Kopřiva	6	6
WC	(Poland) Martyn Pawelski	4	3
(United Kingdom) C Broom	4	3
Q	(Poland) F Peliwo	6	6
Q	(Estonia) D Glinka	4	6	3
Q	(Slovakia) N Gombos	6	1	6
(France) B Paire	6	6
5	(Kazakhstan) T Skatov	4	2
3	(Poland) M Kaśnikowski	5	4
(Belgium) M Geerts	7	6
PR	(Netherlands) T van Rijthoven	7^{7}	0	3
(France) M Guinard	6^{4}	6	6
Alt	(France) Alexis Gautier	6	5	0
(Ukraine) Vadym Ursu	4	7	6
(Syria) H Naw	6	7
LL	(Australia) O Jasika	1	5

Second round
1	(Czech Republic) V Kopřiva	6	7
Q	(Poland) F Peliwo	3	5
Q	(Slovakia) N Gombos	4	7^{7}	7^{7}
(France) B Paire	6	6^{2}	6^{3}
(Belgium) M Geerts	3	4
(France) M Guinard	6	6
(Ukraine) V Ursu	0	1^{r}
(Syria) H Naw	6	5

Quarterfinals
1	(Czech Republic) V Kopřiva	3	7^{7}	6
Q	(Slovakia) N Gombos	6	6^{4}	1
(France) M Guinard	4	2
(Syria) H Naw	6	6

Semifinals
1	(Czech Republic) V Kopřiva	6	3	6
(Syria) H Naw	4	6	1

=== Bottom half ===
First round
6	(Switzerland) M-A Hüsler	6	6
A Kachmazov	4	4
Q	(Georgia (country)) A Bakshi	4	1
Q	(United Kingdom) Oscar Weightman	6	6
(Estonia) M Lajal	6	3	7
(Italy) G Oradini	3	6	5
(India) R Ramanathan	7	3	4
4	(Switzerland) D Stricker	5	6	6
8	(France) A Escoffier	2	6	6
(France) R Bertrand	6	2	2
(Paraguay) AD Vallejo	7	6
WC	(Poland) Marcel Kamrowski	5	2
WC	(Poland) K Żuk	4	3
(Spain) A Barroso Campos	6	6
Q	(France) L Lokoli	5	6	6
2	(Denmark) A Holmgren	7	4	4

Second round
6	(Switzerland) M-A Hüsler	6	6
Q	(United Kingdom) O Weightman	2	1
(Estonia) M Lajal	4	0
4	(Switzerland) D Stricker	6	6
8	(France) A Escoffier	6	6
(Paraguay) AD Vallejo	4	0
(Spain) A Barroso Campos	3	5
Q	(France) L Lokoli	6	7

Quarterfinals
6	(Switzerland) M-A Hüsler	6	6
4	(Switzerland) D Stricker	3	1
8	(France) A Escoffier	6	1	6
Q	(France) L Lokoli	4	6	1

Semifinals
6	(Switzerland) M-A Hüsler	6	3	6
8	(France) A Escoffier	1	6	3
