= 2022 Geneva Open =

ATP tennis tournament

- Date: 15 – 21 May
- Edition: 19th
- Category: ATP Tour 250
- Draw: 28S /16Q /16D
- Prize money: €597,900
- Surface: Clay
- Location: Geneva, Switzerland
- Venue: Tennis Club de Genève

Champions

Singles
- (Norway) Casper Ruud

Doubles
- (Croatia) Nikola Mektić / (Croatia) Mate Pavić
- Geneva Open

The 2022 Gonet Geneva Open was an ATP 250 tennis tournament played on outdoor clay courts. It was the 19th edition of the Geneva Open and part of the ATP Tour 250 series of the 2022 ATP Tour. It took place at the Tennis Club de Genève in Geneva, Switzerland, from May 15 through May 21, 2022.

== Champions ==
=== Singles ===
- (Norway) Casper Ruud def. (Portugal) João Sousa, 7–6^{(7–3)}, 4–6, 7–6^{(7–1)}

=== Doubles ===
- (Croatia) Nikola Mektić / (Croatia) Mate Pavić def. (Spain) Pablo Andújar / (Netherlands) Matwé Middelkoop, 2–6, 6–2, [10–3]

== Points and prize money ==
=== Point distribution ===
Event	W	F	SF	QF	Round of 16	Round of 32	Q	Q2	Q1
Singles	250	150	90	45	20	0	12	6	0
Doubles	250	150	90	45	0	—N/a	—N/a	—N/a	—N/a

=== Prize money ===
Event	W	F	SF	QF	Round of 16	Round of 32	Q2	Q1
Singles	€41,145	€29,500	€21,000	€14,000	€9,000	€5,415	€2,645	€1,375
Doubles*	€15,360	€11,000	€7,250	€4,710	€2,760	—N/a	—N/a	—N/a

_{*per team}

== Singles main draw entrants ==
=== Seeds ===
Country	Player	Rank^{1}	Seed
	Daniil Medvedev	2	1
NOR	Casper Ruud	10	2
CAN	Denis Shapovalov	16	3
USA	Reilly Opelka	17	4
GEO	Nikoloz Basilashvili	25	5
USA	Tommy Paul	34	6
ARG	Federico Delbonis	39	7
KAZ	Alexander Bublik	41	8

- Rankings are as of May 9, 2022.

=== Other entrants ===
The following players received wildcards into the singles main draw:

- (Lithuania) Ričardas Berankis
- Daniil Medvedev
- (Switzerland) Leandro Riedi

The following players received entry from the qualifying draw:

- (Argentina) Facundo Bagnis
- (Italy) Marco Cecchinato
- (Switzerland) Johan Nikles
- (Australia) Christopher O'Connell

=== Withdrawals ===
Before the tournament

- (Spain) Roberto Bautista Agut → replaced by (Finland) Emil Ruusuvuori
- (Serbia) Laslo Đere → replaced by (Australia) Thanasi Kokkinakis
- (Hungary) Márton Fucsovics → replaced by (France) Richard Gasquet
- (United States) Mackenzie McDonald → replaced by (Poland) Kamil Majchrzak
- (Germany) Jan-Lennard Struff → replaced by (Spain) Pablo Andújar

== Doubles main draw entrants ==
=== Seeds ===
Country	Player	Country	Player	Rank^{1}	Seed
CRO	Nikola Mektić	CRO	Mate Pavić	10	1
GBR	Jamie Murray	BRA	Bruno Soares	38	2
ESA	Marcelo Arévalo	NED	Jean-Julien Rojer	49	3
MEX	Santiago González	ARG	Andrés Molteni	62	4

- Rankings are as of May 9, 2022.

=== Other entrants ===
The following pairs received wildcards into the doubles main draw:

- (Switzerland) Jakub Paul / (Switzerland) Leandro Riedi
- (Serbia) Ivan Sabanov / (Serbia) Matej Sabanov

The following pairs received entry as alternates:

- (Spain) Pablo Andújar / (Netherlands) Matwé Middelkoop
- (France) Sadio Doumbia / (France) Fabien Reboul

=== Withdrawals ===
Before the tournament

- (Netherlands) Sander Arends / (Netherlands) Tallon Griekspoor → replaced by (Netherlands) Sander Arends / (Poland) Szymon Walków
- (India) Rohan Bopanna / (Netherlands) Matwé Middelkoop → replaced by (Spain) Pablo Andújar / (Netherlands) Matwé Middelkoop
- (Kazakhstan) Alexander Bublik / (Hungary) Márton Fucsovics → replaced by (Kazakhstan) Alexander Bublik / (Australia) Thanasi Kokkinakis
- (United Kingdom) Lloyd Glasspool / (Finland) Harri Heliövaara → replaced by (France) Sadio Doumbia / (France) Fabien Reboul
- (Kazakhstan) Andrey Golubev / (France) Fabrice Martin → replaced by (Monaco) Romain Arneodo / (France) Fabrice Martin
- (Chile) Julio Peralta / (Croatia) Franko Škugor → replaced by (Portugal) Francisco Cabral / (Portugal) João Sousa
- (Germany) Tim Pütz / (New Zealand) Michael Venus → replaced by (Australia) Luke Saville / (Australia) John-Patrick Smith
