= 2024 São Léo Open – Singles =

Singles
- 2024 São Léo Open

Final
- Champion: (Paraguay) Daniel Vallejo
- Runner-up: (France) Enzo Couacaud
- Score: 6–3, 6–2

Events
Singles	Doubles
- São Léo Open

Juan Pablo Varillas was the defending champion but lost in the semifinals to Enzo Couacaud.

Daniel Vallejo won the title after defeating Couacaud 6–3, 6–2 in the final.

== Seeds ==
1. (Peru) Juan Pablo Varillas (semifinals)
2. (Brazil) Thiago Monteiro (first round)
3. (Argentina) Camilo Ugo Carabelli (quarterfinals)
4. (Brazil) Felipe Meligeni Alves (semifinals)
5. (Argentina) Román Andrés Burruchaga (withdrew)
6. (Argentina) Genaro Alberto Olivieri (second round)
7. (France) Geoffrey Blancaneaux (first round)
8. (Portugal) Gonçalo Oliveira (quarterfinals)
9. (Brazil) Gustavo Heide (withdrew)

== Draw ==
Key

- Q = Qualifier
- WC = Wild card
- LL = Lucky loser
- Alt = Alternate
- ITF = ITF entry
- PR = Protected ranking
- SR = Special ranking
- SE = Special exempt
- JE = Junior exempt
- JR = Junior Accelerator Programme entrant
- CO = College Accelerator Programme entrant
- NG = Next Gen Accelerator Program entrant
- w/o = Walkover
- r = Retired
- d = Defaulted

=== Finals ===
Semifinals
1	(Peru) Juan Pablo Varillas	6	4	6^{2}
(France) Enzo Couacaud	2	6	7^{7}
4	(Brazil) Felipe Meligeni Alves	4	6	0
WC	(Paraguay) Daniel Vallejo	6	3	6

Final
(France) Enzo Couacaud	3	2
WC	(Paraguay) Daniel Vallejo	6	6

=== Top half ===
First round
1	(Peru) JP Varillas	7	7^{7}
LL	(Argentina) G Villanueva	5	6^{0}
(Peru) G Bueno	2	5
Q	(Argentina) Lorenzo Joaquín Rodríguez	6	7
(Italy) G Mager	3	6	7^{7}
WC	(Brazil) D Dutra da Silva	6	3	6^{3}
(Brazil) JL Reis da Silva	5	3
8	(Portugal) G Oliveira	7	6
3	(Argentina) C Ugo Carabelli	6	3	6
(Ecuador) Á Guillén Meza	3	6	4
Q	(Israel) D Cukierman	7	6
Alt	(Spain) C Sánchez Jover	5	2
(Italy) Alexander Weis	3	4
(Argentina) A Collarini	6	6
(France) E Couacaud	6	7^{7}
Q	(Ecuador) E Gómez	4	6^{3}

Second round
1	(Peru) JP Varillas	7^{7}	5	6
Q	(Argentina) LJ Rodríguez	6^{2}	7	3
(Italy) G Mager	6^{5}	2
8	(Portugal) G Oliveira	7^{7}	6
3	(Argentina) C Ugo Carabelli	6	3	6
Q	(Israel) D Cukierman	3	6	4
(Argentina) A Collarini	1	6	4
(France) E Couacaud	6	3	6

Quarterfinals
1	(Peru) JP Varillas	6	7^{7}
8	(Portugal) G Oliveira	4	6^{4}
3	(Argentina) C Ugo Carabelli	2	6	2
(France) E Couacaud	6	1	6

Semifinals
1	(Peru) JP Varillas	6	4	6^{2}
(France) E Couacaud	2	6	7^{7}

=== Bottom half ===
First round
7	(France) G Blancaneaux	3	2
(Brazil) M Pucinelli de Almeida	6	6
(Bolivia) JC Prado Ángelo	6	0	6
Alt	B Bobrov	4	6	2
(Argentina) R Olivo	3	3
WC	(Brazil) M Alves	6	6
Q	(Japan) K Uchida	6^{7}	6	3
4	(Brazil) F Meligeni Alves	7^{9}	2	6
6	(Argentina) GA Olivieri	6	6
Q	(Argentina) JB Torres	2	4
WC	(Paraguay) AD Vallejo	6	5	7
(Canada) L Draxl	2	7	5
(Brazil) P Sakamoto	6	6
Q	(United States) B Kuzuhara	2	0
Alt	(Brazil) O Luz	4	6	7
2	(Brazil) T Monteiro	6	3	5

Second round
(Brazil) M Pucinelli de Almeida	6	2	7
(Bolivia) JC Prado Ángelo	2	6	5
WC	(Brazil) M Alves
4	(Brazil) F Meligeni Alves	w/o
6	(Argentina) GA Olivieri	1	4
WC	(Paraguay) AD Vallejo	6	6
(Brazil) P Sakamoto	4	6	4
Alt	(Brazil) O Luz	6	4	6

Quarterfinals
(Brazil) M Pucinelli de Almeida	6	5	6^{4}
4	(Brazil) F Meligeni Alves	3	7	7^{7}
WC	(Paraguay) AD Vallejo	6	6
Alt	(Brazil) O Luz	3	1

Semifinals
4	(Brazil) F Meligeni Alves	4	6	0
WC	(Paraguay) AD Vallejo	6	3	6
