= 2017 Rio Tennis Classic – Singles =

Singles
- 2017 Rio Tennis Classic

Final
- Champion: (Argentina) Carlos Berlocq
- Runner-up: (Spain) Jaume Munar
- Score: 6–4, 2–6, 3–0 ret.

Events
Singles	Doubles
- Rio Tennis Classic

This was the first edition of the tournament.

Carlos Berlocq won the title after Jaume Munar retired trailing 4–6, 6–2, 0–3 in the final.

== Seeds ==
1. (Brazil) Rogério Dutra Silva (quarterfinals)
2. (Portugal) Gastão Elias (withdrew)
3. (Chile) Nicolás Jarry (first round)
4. (Argentina) Carlos Berlocq (champion)
5. (Brazil) Thiago Monteiro (semifinals)
6. (El Salvador) Marcelo Arévalo (second round)
7. (Portugal) Gonçalo Oliveira (first round)
8. (Spain) Jaume Munar (final, retired)

== Draw ==
Key

- Q = Qualifier
- WC = Wild card
- LL = Lucky loser
- Alt = Alternate
- ITF = ITF entry
- PR = Protected ranking
- SR = Special ranking
- SE = Special exempt
- JE = Junior exempt
- JR = Junior Accelerator Programme entrant
- CO = College Accelerator Programme entrant
- NG = Next Gen Accelerator Program entrant
- w/o = Walkover
- r = Retired
- d = Defaulted

=== Finals ===
Semifinals
5	(Brazil) Thiago Monteiro	2	6^{5}
4	(Argentina) Carlos Berlocq	6	7^{7}
(Argentina) Pedro Cachin	4	2
8	(Spain) Jaume Munar	6	6

Final
4	(Argentina) Carlos Berlocq	6	2	3
8	(Spain) Jaume Munar	4	6	0^{r}

=== Top half ===
First round
1/WC	(Brazil) R Dutra Silva	6	6
(Austria) M Linzer	2	0
Q	(Brazil) F Neis	6	2	6
WC	(Brazil) Christian Oliveira	2	6	3
Q	(Spain) R Carballés Baena	6	6
(Brazil) J Souza	2	3
Q	(Brazil) A Ghem	2	1
5	(Brazil) T Monteiro	6	6
4	(Argentina) C Berlocq	6	6
(Colombia) DE Galán	4	4
WC	(Brazil) P Sakamoto	6	6
(Argentina) M González	3	3
(Spain) J Martí	4	3^{r}
(Sweden) C Lindell	6	3
(Brazil) G Clezar	3	6	6
7	(Portugal) G Oliveira	6	3	3

Second round
1/WC	(Brazil) R Dutra Silva	6	0
Q	(Brazil) F Neis	0	0^{r}
Q	(Spain) R Carballés Baena	6^{4}	3
5	(Brazil) T Monteiro	7^{7}	6
4	(Argentina) C Berlocq	6	6
WC	(Brazil) P Sakamoto	4	2
(Sweden) C Lindell	3	0
(Brazil) G Clezar	6	6

Quarterfinals
1/WC	(Brazil) R Dutra Silva	6^{4}	5
5	(Brazil) T Monteiro	7^{7}	7
4	(Argentina) C Berlocq	7	6
(Brazil) G Clezar	5	1

Semifinals
5	(Brazil) T Monteiro	2	6^{5}
4	(Argentina) C Berlocq	6	7^{7}

=== Bottom half ===
First round
6	(El Salvador) M Arévalo	6	6
Q	(Monaco) R Arneodo	2	2
(Argentina) P Cachin	7	6
(Brazil) JP Sorgi	5	1
(Dominican Republic) J Hernández-Fernández	4	6	6
(Uruguay) M Cuevas	6	3	4
WC	(Brazil) T Seyboth Wild	6	7^{7}
3	(Chile) N Jarry	3	6^{5}
8	(Spain) J Munar	4	6	6
(Argentina) F Coria	6	2	0
(Argentina) JP Ficovich	1	6^{4}
(Argentina) F Argüello	6	7^{7}
(Argentina) JI Londero	6	6
(Argentina) H Casanova	2	2
(Argentina) A Collarini	7	6
LL	(Hungary) P Nagy	5	2

Second round
6	(El Salvador) M Arévalo	3	7^{7}	3
(Argentina) P Cachin	6	6^{5}	6
(Dominican Republic) J Hernández-Fernández	7	4	3
WC	(Brazil) T Seyboth Wild	5	6	0^{r}
8	(Spain) J Munar	6	7^{7}
(Argentina) F Argüello	2	6^{4}
(Argentina) JI Londero	4	3
(Argentina) A Collarini	6	6

Quarterfinals
(Argentina) P Cachin	6	6
(Dominican Republic) J Hernández-Fernández	2	0
8	(Spain) J Munar	6	6
(Argentina) A Collarini	2	3

Semifinals
(Argentina) P Cachin	4	2
8	(Spain) J Munar	6	6
