= 2022 Geneva Open – Doubles =

Doubles
- 2022 Geneva Open

Final
- Champions: (Croatia) Nikola Mektić (Croatia) Mate Pavić
- Runners-up: (Spain) Pablo Andújar (Netherlands) Matwé Middelkoop
- Score: 2–6, 6–2, [10–3]

Events
Singles	Doubles
← 2021 ·	Geneva Open	· 2023 →

Nikola Mektić and Mate Pavić defeated Pablo Andújar and Matwé Middelkoop in the final, 2–6, 6–2, [10–3] to win the doubles tennis title at the 2022 Geneva Open.

John Peers and Michael Venus were the defending champions, but chose not to compete this year.

== Seeds ==
1. (Croatia) Nikola Mektić / (Croatia) Mate Pavić (champions)
2. (United Kingdom) Jamie Murray / (Brazil) Bruno Soares (first round)
3. (El Salvador) Marcelo Arévalo / (Netherlands) Jean-Julien Rojer (quarterfinals)
4. (Mexico) Santiago González / (Argentina) Andrés Molteni (first round)

== Draw ==
=== Key ===
- Q = Qualifier
- WC = Wild card
- LL = Lucky loser
- Alt = Alternate
- SE = Special exempt
- PR = Protected ranking
- ITF = ITF entry
- JE = Junior exempt
- w/o = Walkover
- r = Retired
- d = Defaulted
- SR = Special ranking

=== Draw ===
First round
1	(Croatia) N Mektić (Croatia) M Pavić	6	6
PR	(Netherlands) S Arends (Poland) S Walków	4	4
(Monaco) R Arneodo (France) F Martin	6	4	[20]
(Australia) L Saville (Australia) J-P Smith	4	6	[18]
4	(Mexico) S González (Argentina) A Molteni	7^{7}	3	[4]
WC	(Serbia) I Sabanov (Serbia) M Sabanov	6^{5}	6	[10]
(Lithuania) R Berankis (Spain) A Ramos Viñolas	3	4
(Czech Republic) R Jebavý (United States) H Reese	6	6
(Portugal) F Cabral (Portugal) J Sousa	6^{4}	7^{7}	[12]
(Kazakhstan) A Bublik (Australia) T Kokkinakis	7^{7}	6^{4}	[10]
(Mexico) H Hach Verdugo (Austria) P Oswald	5	3
3	(El Salvador) M Arévalo (Netherlands) J-J Rojer	7	6
Alt	(Spain) P Andújar (Netherlands) M Middelkoop	3	6	[13]
Alt	(France) S Doumbia (France) F Reboul	6	3	[11]
WC	(Switzerland) J Paul (Switzerland) L Riedi	5	6	[10]
2	(United Kingdom) J Murray (Brazil) B Soares	7	4	[5]

Quarterfinals
1	(Croatia) N Mektić (Croatia) M Pavić	6^{5}	6	[10]
(Monaco) R Arneodo (France) F Martin	7^{7}	2	[5]
WC	(Serbia) I Sabanov (Serbia) M Sabanov	3	4
(Czech Republic) R Jebavý (United States) H Reese	6	6
(Portugal) F Cabral (Portugal) J Sousa	7	3	[11]
3	(El Salvador) M Arévalo (Netherlands) J-J Rojer	5	6	[9]
Alt	(Spain) P Andújar (Netherlands) M Middelkoop	w/o
WC	(Switzerland) J Paul (Switzerland) L Riedi

Semifinals
1	(Croatia) N Mektić (Croatia) M Pavić	7^{10}	7^{8}
(Czech Republic) R Jebavý (United States) H Reese	6^{8}	6^{6}
(Portugal) F Cabral (Portugal) J Sousa	4	4
Alt	(Spain) P Andújar (Netherlands) M Middelkoop	6	6

Final
1	(Croatia) N Mektić (Croatia) M Pavić	2	6	[10]
Alt	(Spain) P Andújar (Netherlands) M Middelkoop	6	2	[3]
