= 2024 Kozerki Open – Doubles =

Doubles
- 2024 Kozerki Open

Final
- Champions: (United Kingdom) Charles Broom (United Kingdom) David Stevenson
- Runners-up: (Israel) Daniel Cukierman (Denmark) Johannes Ingildsen
- Score: 6–3, 7–6^{(7–3)}

Events
Singles	Doubles
- Kozerki Open

Théo Arribagé and Luca Sanchez were the defending champions but only Sanchez chose to defend his title, partnering Divij Sharan. They lost in the first round to Michael Geerts and Szymon Walków.

Charles Broom and David Stevenson won the title after defeating Daniel Cukierman and Johannes Ingildsen 6–3, 7–6^{(7–3)} in the final.

== Seeds ==
1. (Poland) Karol Drzewiecki / (Poland) Piotr Matuszewski (quarterfinals)
2. (United Kingdom) Joshua Paris / (India) Ramkumar Ramanathan (first round)
3. (United Kingdom) Charles Broom / (United Kingdom) David Stevenson (champions)
4. (Israel) Daniel Cukierman / (Denmark) Johannes Ingildsen (final)

== Draw ==
Key

- Q = Qualifier
- WC = Wild card
- LL = Lucky loser
- Alt = Alternate
- ITF = ITF entry
- PR = Protected ranking
- SR = Special ranking
- SE = Special exempt
- JE = Junior exempt
- JR = Junior Accelerator Programme entrant
- CO = College Accelerator Programme entrant
- NG = Next Gen Accelerator Program entrant
- w/o = Walkover
- r = Retired
- d = Defaulted

=== Draw ===
First round
1	(Poland) K Drzewiecki (Poland) P Matuszewski	6	7^{7}
(Estonia) M Lajal (Estonia) Johannes Seeman	2	6^{3}
(Zimbabwe) CJ Lock (New Zealand) R Statham	7	1	[5]
(Georgia (country)) A Bakshi (Slovakia) L Pokorný	5	6	[10]
4	(Israel) D Cukierman (Denmark) J Ingildsen	3	6	[10]
WC	(Poland) Marcel Kamrowski (Poland) K Żuk	6	3	[8]
WC	(Poland) S Kielan (Poland) F Pieczonka	6^{9}	1
(Italy) G Oradini (Austria) D Pichler	7^{11}	6
(France) R Bertrand (Paraguay) AD Vallejo	6	5
(Ukraine) Vadym Ursu (Ukraine) V Uzhylovskyi	2	4^{r}
(Spain) A Barroso Campos (Spain) B Pujol Navarro	3	7	[2]
3	(United Kingdom) C Broom (United Kingdom) D Stevenson	6	5	[10]
(France) L Sanchez (India) D Sharan	5	2
(Belgium) M Geerts (Poland) S Walków	7	6
(United Kingdom) S Duncan (United States) H Reese	6	6
2	(United Kingdom) J Paris (India) R Ramanathan	4	3

Quarterfinals
1	(Poland) K Drzewiecki (Poland) P Matuszewski	6^{2}	6^{5}
(Georgia (country)) A Bakshi (Slovakia) L Pokorný	7^{7}	7^{7}
4	(Israel) D Cukierman (Denmark) J Ingildsen	4	7^{8}	[10]
(Italy) G Oradini (Austria) D Pichler	6	6^{6}	[7]
(France) R Bertrand (Paraguay) AD Vallejo	6	1	[4]
3	(United Kingdom) C Broom (United Kingdom) D Stevenson	4	6	[10]
(Belgium) M Geerts (Poland) S Walków	5	1
(United Kingdom) S Duncan (United States) H Reese	7	6

Semifinals
(Georgia (country)) A Bakshi (Slovakia) L Pokorný	4	6^{3}
4	(Israel) D Cukierman (Denmark) J Ingildsen	6	7^{7}
3	(United Kingdom) C Broom (United Kingdom) D Stevenson	7^{7}	4	[10]
(United Kingdom) S Duncan (United States) H Reese	6^{3}	6	[6]

Final
4	(Israel) D Cukierman (Denmark) J Ingildsen	3	6^{3}
3	(United Kingdom) C Broom (United Kingdom) D Stevenson	6	7^{7}
