= 2024 Kozerki Open =

- Date: 12–17 August
- Edition: 3rd
- Surface: Hard
- Location: Grodzisk Mazowiecki, Poland

Champions

Singles
- (Switzerland) Marc-Andrea Hüsler

Doubles
- (United Kingdom) Charles Broom / (United Kingdom) David Stevenson
← 2023 ·	Kozerki Open	· 2025 →

The 2024 Kozerki Open was a professional tennis tournament played on hard courts. It was the third edition of the tournament which was part of the 2024 ATP Challenger Tour. It took place in Grodzisk Mazowiecki, Poland between 12 and 17 August 2024.

== Singles main-draw entrants ==
=== Seeds ===
Country	Player	Rank^{1}	Seed
CZE	Vít Kopřiva	133	1
DEN	August Holmgren	167	2
POL	Maks Kaśnikowski	186	3
SUI	Dominic Stricker	188	4
KAZ	Timofey Skatov	191	5
SUI	Marc-Andrea Hüsler	200	6
~~BEL~~	~~Joris De Loore~~	~~212~~	~~7~~
FRA	Antoine Escoffier	234	8

- ^{1} Rankings were as of 5 August 2024.

=== Other entrants ===
The following players received wildcards into the singles main draw:

- (Poland) Marcel Kamrowski
- (Poland) Martyn Pawelski
- (Poland) Kacper Żuk

The following player received entry into the singles main draw using a protected ranking:

- (Netherlands) Tim van Rijthoven

The following player received entry into the singles main draw as an alternate:

- (France) Alexis Gautier

The following players received entry from the qualifying draw:

- (Georgia (country)) Aleksandre Bakshi
- (Estonia) Daniil Glinka
- (Slovakia) Norbert Gombos
- (France) Laurent Lokoli
- (Poland) Filip Peliwo
- (United Kingdom) Oscar Weightman

The following player received entry as a lucky loser:

- (Australia) Omar Jasika

== Champions ==
=== Singles ===
- (Switzerland) Marc-Andrea Hüsler def. (Czech Republic) Vít Kopřiva 6–1, 6–4.

=== Doubles ===
- (United Kingdom) Charles Broom / (United Kingdom) David Stevenson def. (Israel) Daniel Cukierman / (Denmark) Johannes Ingildsen 6–3, 7–6^{(7–3)}.
