= 2024 São Léo Open =

- Date: 25–31 March
- Edition: 4th
- Surface: Clay
- Location: São Leopoldo, Brazil

Champions

Singles
- (Paraguay) Daniel Vallejo

Doubles
- (Brazil) Marcelo Demoliner / (Brazil) Orlando Luz
- São Léo Open

The 2024 São Léo Open was a professional tennis tournament played on clay courts. It was the fourth edition of the tournament which was part of the 2024 ATP Challenger Tour. It took place in São Leopoldo, Brazil between 25 and 31 March 2024.

== Singles main-draw entrants ==
=== Seeds ===
Country	Player	Rank^{1}	Seed
PER	Juan Pablo Varillas	95	1
BRA	Thiago Monteiro	110	2
ARG	Camilo Ugo Carabelli	112	3
BRA	Felipe Meligeni Alves	134	4
~~ARG~~	~~Román Andrés Burruchaga~~	~~161~~	~~5~~
ARG	Genaro Alberto Olivieri	185	6
FRA	Geoffrey Blancaneaux	220	7
POR	Gonçalo Oliveira	224	8
~~BRA~~	~~Gustavo Heide~~	~~225~~	~~9~~

- ^{1} Rankings are as of 18 March 2024.

=== Other entrants ===
The following players received wildcards into the singles main draw:

- (Brazil) Mateus Alves
- (Brazil) Daniel Dutra da Silva
- (Paraguay) Daniel Vallejo

The following players received entry into the singles main draw as alternates:

- Bogdan Bobrov
- (Brazil) Orlando Luz
- (Spain) Carlos Sánchez Jover

The following players received entry from the qualifying draw:

- (Israel) Daniel Cukierman
- (Ecuador) Emilio Gómez
- (United States) Bruno Kuzuhara
- (Argentina) Lorenzo Joaquín Rodríguez
- (Argentina) Juan Bautista Torres
- (Japan) Kaichi Uchida

The following player received entry as a lucky loser:

- (Argentina) Gonzalo Villanueva

== Champions ==
=== Singles ===
- (Paraguay) Daniel Vallejo def. (France) Enzo Couacaud 6–3, 6–2.

=== Doubles ===
- (Brazil) Marcelo Demoliner / (Brazil) Orlando Luz def. (Canada) Liam Draxl / (Italy) Alexander Weis 7–5, 3–6, [10–8].
