= 2017 Rio Tennis Classic – Doubles =

Doubles
- 2017 Rio Tennis Classic

Final
- Champions: (Argentina) Máximo González (Brazil) Fabrício Neis
- Runners-up: (El Salvador) Marcelo Arévalo (Mexico) Miguel Ángel Reyes-Varela
- Score: 5–7, 6–4, [10–4]

Events
Singles	Doubles
- Rio Tennis Classic

This was the first edition of the tournament.

Máximo González and Fabrício Neis won the title after defeating Marcelo Arévalo and Miguel Ángel Reyes-Varela 5–7, 6–4, [10–4] in the final.

== Seeds ==
1. (Brazil) Fabiano de Paula / (Brazil) Marcelo Demoliner (semifinals)
2. (El Salvador) Marcelo Arévalo / (Mexico) Miguel Ángel Reyes-Varela (final)
3. (Argentina) Máximo González / (Brazil) Fabrício Neis (champions)
4. (Monaco) Romain Arneodo / (Brazil) Fernando Romboli (semifinals)

== Draw ==
Key

- Q = Qualifier
- WC = Wild card
- LL = Lucky loser
- Alt = Alternate
- ITF = ITF entry
- PR = Protected ranking
- SR = Special ranking
- SE = Special exempt
- JE = Junior exempt
- JR = Junior Accelerator Programme entrant
- CO = College Accelerator Programme entrant
- NG = Next Gen Accelerator Program entrant
- w/o = Walkover
- r = Retired
- d = Defaulted

First round
1	(Brazil) F de Paula (Brazil) M Demoliner	7	6
WC	(Brazil) A Ghem (Brazil) E Russi Assumpção	5	3
(Dominican Republic) J Hernández-Fernández (Brazil) J Souza	6	2	[10]
(Argentina) P Cachin (Brazil) JP Sorgi	4	6	[3]
3	(Argentina) M González (Brazil) F Neis	6	6
(Uruguay) M Cuevas (Sweden) C Lindell	3	1
(Brazil) G Clezar (Portugal) G Oliveira	w/o
(Spain) R Carballés Baena (Spain) J Martí
(Argentina) F Agamenone (Argentina) F Argüello	6	6
(Argentina) A Collarini (Argentina) F Coria	2	4
WC	(Brazil) P Sakamoto (Brazil) T Seyboth Wild	2	6^{6}
4	(Monaco) R Arneodo (Brazil) F Romboli	6	7^{8}
(Argentina) H Casanova (Argentina) JP Ficovich	6	2	[6]
WC	(Brazil) Gilbert Soares Klier Júnior (Brazil) Christian Oliveira	4	6	[10]
(Colombia) DE Galán (Argentina) JI Londero	2	1
2	(El Salvador) M Arévalo (Mexico) MÁ Reyes-Varela	6	6

Quarterfinals
1	(Brazil) F de Paula (Brazil) M Demoliner	6	7
(Dominican Republic) J Hernández-Fernández (Brazil) J Souza	1	5
3	(Argentina) M González (Brazil) F Neis	6	6
(Brazil) G Clezar (Portugal) G Oliveira	2	4
(Argentina) F Agamenone (Argentina) F Argüello	2	4
4	(Monaco) R Arneodo (Brazil) F Romboli	6	6
WC	(Brazil) GS Klier Júnior (Brazil) C Oliveira	3	2
2	(El Salvador) M Arévalo (Mexico) MÁ Reyes-Varela	6	6

Semifinals
1	(Brazil) F de Paula (Brazil) M Demoliner	3	4
3	(Argentina) M González (Brazil) F Neis	6	6
4	(Monaco) R Arneodo (Brazil) F Romboli	7^{8}	4	[8]
2	(El Salvador) M Arévalo (Mexico) MÁ Reyes-Varela	6^{6}	6	[10]

Final
3	(Argentina) M González (Brazil) F Neis	5	6	[10]
2	(El Salvador) M Arévalo (Mexico) MÁ Reyes-Varela	7	4	[4]
