= 2022 São Léo Open =

- Date: 14–20 November
- Edition: 3rd
- Surface: Clay
- Location: São Leopoldo, Brazil

Champions

Singles
- (Peru) Juan Pablo Varillas

Doubles
- (Argentina) Guido Andreozzi / (Argentina) Guillermo Durán
- São Léo Open

The 2022 São Léo Open was a professional tennis tournament played on clay courts. It was the 3rd edition of the tournament which was part of the 2022 ATP Challenger Tour. It took place in São Leopoldo, Brazil between 14 and 20 November 2022.

== Singles main-draw entrants ==
=== Seeds ===
Country	Player	Rank^{1}	Seed
ARG	Facundo Bagnis	103	1
PER	Juan Pablo Varillas	116	2
ITA	Franco Agamenone	154	3
BRA	Felipe Meligeni Alves	164	4
ARG	Renzo Olivo	186	5
ARG	Facundo Díaz Acosta	188	6
BRA	Matheus Pucinelli de Almeida	199	7
POR	Gastão Elias	214	8

- ^{1} Rankings are as of 7 November 2022.

=== Other entrants ===
The following players received wildcards into the singles main draw:

- (Brazil) João Fonseca
- (Brazil) Gustavo Heide
- (Brazil) Matheus Pucinelli de Almeida

The following players received entry into the singles main draw as alternates:

- (Brazil) João Lucas Reis da Silva
- (Brazil) Thiago Seyboth Wild

The following players received entry from the qualifying draw:

- (Brazil) Mateus Alves
- (Sweden) Leo Borg
- (Netherlands) Max Houkes
- (Brazil) Wilson Leite
- (Argentina) Juan Pablo Paz
- (Switzerland) Damien Wenger

The following player received entry as a lucky loser:

- (Brazil) Eduardo Ribeiro

== Champions ==
=== Singles ===
- (Peru) Juan Pablo Varillas def. (Argentina) Facundo Bagnis 7–6^{(7–5)}, 4–6, 6–4.

=== Doubles ===
- (Argentina) Guido Andreozzi / (Argentina) Guillermo Durán def. (Brazil) Felipe Meligeni Alves / (Brazil) João Lucas Reis da Silva 5–1 ret.
