= 2026 São Léo Open =

- Date: 30 March – 5 April
- Edition: 5th
- Surface: Clay
- Location: São Leopoldo, Brazil

Champions

Singles
- (Argentina) Facundo Díaz Acosta

Doubles
- (Bolivia) Boris Arias / (Denmark) Johannes Ingildsen
- São Léo Open

The 2026 São Léo Open was a professional tennis tournament played on clay courts. It was the fifth edition of the tournament which was part of the 2026 ATP Challenger Tour. It took place in São Leopoldo, Brazil between 30 March and 5 April 2026.

== Singles main-draw entrants ==
=== Seeds ===
Country	Player	Rank^{1}	Seed
CHI	Tomás Barrios Vera	119	1
BOL	Hugo Dellien	159	2
BOL	Juan Carlos Prado Ángelo	206	3
ECU	Álvaro Guillén Meza	207	4
PER	Gonzalo Bueno	213	5
ARG	Lautaro Midón	225	6
ARG	Facundo Díaz Acosta	226	7
BRA	Felipe Meligeni Alves	240	8

- ^{1} Rankings are as of 16 March 2026.

=== Other entrants ===
The following players received wildcards into the singles main draw:

- (Bolivia) Hugo Dellien
- (Brazil) Bruno Fernandez
- (Brazil) Paulo André Saraiva dos Santos

The following players received entry into the singles main draw as alternates:

- (Argentina) Valerio Aboian
- (Uruguay) Joaquín Aguilar Cardozo
- (Argentina) Lorenzo Joaquín Rodríguez
- (Brazil) João Eduardo Schiessl

The following players received entry from the qualifying draw:

- (Argentina) Luciano Emanuel Ambrogi
- (Argentina) Santiago de la Fuente
- (Peru) Conner Huertas del Pino
- (Switzerland) Johan Nikles
- (Argentina) Carlos María Zárate
- (Argentina) Máximo Zeitune

== Champions ==
=== Singles ===
- (Argentina) Facundo Díaz Acosta def. (Bolivia) Hugo Dellien 5–7, 6–2, 6–4.

=== Doubles ===
- (Bolivia) Boris Arias / (Denmark) Johannes Ingildsen def. (Spain) Nicolás Álvarez Varona / (Spain) Mario Mansilla Díez 6–3, 4–6, [10–8].
