= 2017 Rio Tennis Classic =

- Date: 20–26 November
- Edition: 1st
- Draw: 32S / 16D
- Surface: Clay
- Location: Rio de Janeiro, Brazil

Champions

Singles
- (Argentina) Carlos Berlocq

Doubles
- (Argentina) Máximo González / (Brazil) Fabrício Neis
- Rio Tennis Classic

The 2017 Rio Tennis Classic was a professional tennis tournament played on clay courts. It was the first edition of the tournament which is part of the 2017 ATP Challenger Tour. It took place in Rio de Janeiro, Brazil from 20 to 26 November 2017.

== Singles main-draw entrants ==
=== Seeds ===
Country	Player	Rank^{1}	Seed
BRA	Rogério Dutra Silva	94	1
~~POR~~	~~Gastão Elias~~	~~113~~	~~2~~
CHI	Nicolás Jarry	118	3
ARG	Carlos Berlocq	121	4
BRA	Thiago Monteiro	129	5
ESA	Marcelo Arévalo	207	6
POR	Gonçalo Oliveira	211	7
ESP	Jaume Munar	215	8

- ^{1} Rankings are as of 13 November 2017.

=== Other entrants ===
The following players received wildcards into the singles main draw:

- (Brazil) Rogério Dutra Silva
- (Brazil) Christian Oliveira
- (Brazil) Pedro Sakamoto
- (Brazil) Thiago Seyboth Wild

The following players received entry from the qualifying draw:

- (Monaco) Romain Arneodo
- (Spain) Roberto Carballés Baena
- (Brazil) André Ghem
- (Brazil) Fabrício Neis

The following player received entry as a lucky loser:

- (Hungary) Péter Nagy

== Champions ==
=== Singles ===
- (Argentina) Carlos Berlocq def. (Spain) Jaume Munar 6–4, 2–6, 3–0 ret.

=== Doubles ===
- (Argentina) Máximo González / (Brazil) Fabrício Neis def. (El Salvador) Marcelo Arévalo / (Mexico) Miguel Ángel Reyes-Varela 5–7, 6–4, [10–4].
