= Johannes Ingildsen =

Danish tennis player

- Country (sports): Denmark
- Residence: Copenhagen, Denmark
- Born: 1 July 1997 (age 29) Frederiksberg, Denmark
- Height: 1.93 m (6 ft 4 in)
- Plays: Right-handed (two-handed backhand)
- College: University of Florida
- Prize money: US $120,849

Singles
- Career record: 1–2 (at ATP Tour level, Grand Slam level, and in Davis Cup)
- Career titles: 0
- Highest ranking: No. 638 (12 September 2022)
- Current ranking: No. 1,293 (16 November 2026)

Doubles
- Career record: 6–5 (at ATP Tour level, Grand Slam level, and in Davis Cup)
- Career titles: 0; 3 Challenger
- Highest ranking: No. 108 (18 May 2026)
- Current ranking: No. 151 (16 November 2026)

Team competitions
- Davis Cup: 4–2
- Last updated on: 16 November 2026.

Johannes Ingildsen (born 1 July 1997) is a Danish tennis player. Ingildsen has a career high ATP singles ranking of world No. 638 achieved on 12 September 2022 and a career high ATP doubles ranking of No. 108 achieved on 18 May 2026.

Ingildsen represents Denmark at the Davis Cup, where he has a W/L record of 4–2.

== ATP Challenger Tour finals ==
=== Doubles: 17 (3 title, 14 runner-ups) ===
Legend ATP Challenger Tour (3–14)	Finals by surface Hard (0–5) Clay (3–9) Grass (0–0) Carpet (0–0)

Result	W–L	Date	Tournament	Tier	Surface	Partner	Opponents	Score
Win	1–0	Apr 2024	Tallahassee, USA	Challenger	Clay (green)	(Sweden) Simon Freund	(United States) William Blumberg (Venezuela) Luis David Martínez	7–5, 7–6^{(7–4)}
Loss	1–1	Apr 2024	Savannah, USA	Challenger	Clay (green)	(Sweden) Simon Freund	(United States) Christian Harrison (United Kingdom) Marcus Willis	3–6, 3–6
Loss	1–2	May 2024	Oeiras II, Portugal	Challenger	Clay	(Sweden) Simon Freund	(India) Anirudh Chandrasekar (India) Arjun Kadhe	5–7, 4–6
Loss	1–3	Jul 2024	Tampere, Finland	Challenger	Clay	(Australia) Thomas Fancutt	(Spain) Íñigo Cervantes (Spain) Daniel Rincón	3–6, 4–6
Loss	1–4	Aug 2024	Grodzisk Mazowiecki, Poland	Challenger	Hard	(Israel) Daniel Cukierman	(United Kingdom) Charles Broom (United Kingdom) David Stevenson	3–6, 6–7^{(3–7)}
Loss	1–5	Sep 2024	Istanbul, Turkey	Challenger	Hard	(Denmark) August Holmgren	(Georgia (country)) Aleksandre Bakshi (Turkey) Yankı Erel	6–7^{(4–7)}, 5–7
Loss	1–6	Sep 2024	Mouilleron-le-Captif, France	Challenger	Hard (i)	(Denmark) August Holmgren	(United States) Christian Harrison (Brazil) Marcelo Demoliner	3–6, 5–7
Loss	1–7	May 2025	Vicenza, Italy	Challenger	Clay	(Denmark) August Holmgren	(Italy) Federico Bondioli (Italy) Stefano Travaglia	2–6, 1–6
Loss	1–8	Jun 2025	Modena, Italy	Challenger	Clay	(Slovakia) Miloš Karol	(Argentina) Federico Agustín Gómez (Venezuela) Luis David Martínez	5–7, 6–7^{(5–7)}
Loss	1–9	Jul 2025	Trieste, Italy	Challenger	Clay	(Netherlands) Robin Haase	(Switzerland) Jakub Paul (Czech Republic) Matěj Vocel	5–7, 1–6
Loss	1–10	Aug 2025	Todi, Italy	Challenger	Clay	(Israel) Daniel Cukierman	(Italy) Filippo Romano (Italy) Jacopo Vasamì	4–6, 3–6
Loss	1–11	Aug 2025	Como, Italy	Challenger	Clay	(Israel) Daniel Cukierman	(Romania) Victor Vlad Cornea (Argentina) Santiago Rodríguez Taverna	3–6, 2–6
Win	2–11	Nov 2025	Florianópolis, Brazil	Challenger	Clay	(Bolivia) Boris Arias	(Peru) Alexander Merino (Germany) Christoph Negritu	3–6, 6–3, [10–8]
Win	3–11	Mar 2026	São Leopoldo, Brazil	Challenger	Clay	(Bolivia) Boris Arias	(Spain) Nicolás Álvarez Varona (Spain) Mario Mansilla Díez	6–3, 4–6, [10–8]
Loss	3–12	May 2026	Zagreb, Croatia	Challenger	Clay	(United States) George Goldhoff	(United Kingdom) Finn Bass (Bulgaria) Anthony Genov	6–4, 3–6, [8–10]
Loss	3–13	Aug 2026	Manacor, Spain	Challenger	Hard	(Denmark) Oskar Brostrøm Poulsen	(Spain) Alberto Barroso Campos (Spain) David Vega Hernández	5–7, 6–7^{(5–7)}
Loss	3–14	Nov 2026	Knoxville, USA	Challenger	Hard (i)	(Ecuador) Andy Andrade	(Netherlands) Jarno Jans (Belgium) Joran Vliegen	5–7, 3–6

== ITF World Tennis Tour finals ==
=== Singles: 2 (1 title, 1 runner-up) ===
Legend ITF WTT (1–1)

Result	W–L	Date	Tournament	Tier	Surface	Opponent	Score
Loss	0–1	Oct 2021	M15 Tallahassee, USA	WTT	Hard	(United States) Vasil Kirkov	6–4, 1–6, 2–6
Win	1–1	Nov 2021	M15 Santo Domingo, Dominican Republic	WTT	Hard	(Peru) Jorge Panta	6–4, 6–3

=== Doubles: 25 (18 titles, 7 runner-ups) ===
Legend ITF WTT (18–7)	Finals by surface Hard (10–5) Clay (8–2) Grass (0–0) Carpet (0–0)

Result	W–L	Date	Tournament	Tier	Surface	Partner	Opponents	Score
Loss	0–1	Jul 2021	M15 Vejle, Denmark	WTT	Clay	(Denmark) Christian Sigsgaard	(Denmark) Carl Emil Overbeck (Denmark) Benjamin Hannestad	6–7^{(6–8)}, 6–4, [8–10]
Win	1–1	Aug 2021	M15 Frederiksberg, Denmark	WTT	Clay	(Denmark) Christian Sigsgaard	(Denmark) Simon Friis Søndergaard (Denmark) Benjamin Hannestad	7–5, 6–3
Loss	1–2	Sep 2021	M15 Monastir, Tunisia	WTT	Hard	(Denmark) August Holmgren	(Australia) Jeremy Beale (Australia) Li Tu	4–6, 2–6
Loss	1–3	Oct 2021	M15 Naples, USA	WTT	Clay	(Portugal) Duarte Vale	(United States) Bruno Kuzuhara (Jordan) Abedallah Shelbayh	4–6, 1–6
Win	2–3	Oct 2021	M15 Vero Beach, USA	WTT	Clay	(Portugal) Duarte Vale	(Canada) Liam Draxl (United States) Ben Shelton	6–3, 6–4
Win	3–3	Dec 2021	M15 Santo Domingo, Dominican Republic	WTT	Hard	(United States) Alfredo Perez	(France) Enzo Wallart (France) Alexis Musialek	7–6^{(7–4)}, 6–3
Win	4–3	Dec 2021	M15 Santo Domingo, Dominican Republic	WTT	Hard	(United States) Alfredo Perez	(Italy) Marco Brugnerotto (Republic of Ireland) Osgar O'Hoisin	6–3, 6–3
Win	5–3	Feb 2022	M15 Villena, Spain	WTT	Hard	(Portugal) Pedro Araújo	(Belgium) Buvaysar Gadamauri (France) Maxime Chazal	6–3, 6–3
Win	6–3	May 2022	M25 Kalmar, Sweden	WTT	Clay	(Sweden) Simon Freund	(Sweden) Timothy Carlsson Seger (Sweden) Isac Strömberg	6–1, 6–1
Win	7–3	Jun 2022	M25 Skopje, North Macedonia	WTT	Clay	(Sweden) Simon Freund	(Sweden) Filip Bergevi (Tunisia) Moez Echargui	7–5, 6–3
Win	8–3	Jul 2022	M25 Poprad, Slovakia	WTT	Clay	(Sweden) Simon Freund	(Slovakia) Lukáš Pokorný (Slovakia) Miloš Karol	6–4, 6–2
Win	9–3	Aug 2022	M15 Fredriksberg, Denmark	WTT	Clay	(Denmark) Christian Sigsgaard	(Denmark) Benjamin Hannestad (Denmark) Carl Emil Overbeck	7–6^{(11–9)}, 6–4
Win	10–3	Aug 2022	M25 Lesa, Italy	WTT	Clay	(Denmark) August Holmgren	(Italy) Federico Bondioli (Italy) Filippo Romano	6–1, 6–4
Loss	10–4	Nov 2022	M15 Fayetteville, USA	WTT	Hard	(Denmark) Christian Sigsgaard	(United States) Tyler Zink (United States) George Goldhoff	6–1, 4–6, [2–10]
Win	11–4	Feb 2023	M15 Sharm El Sheikh, Egypt	WTT	Hard	(Denmark) Elmer Møller	(Egypt) Akram El Sallaly (Egypt) Mohamed Safwat	6–3, 6–2
Loss	11–5	Apr 2023	M25 Nottingham, United Kingdom	WTT	Hard	(Denmark) August Holmgren	(Austria) Neil Oberleitner (United Kingdom) Marcus Willis	7–6 ^{(7–1)}, 6–3
Win	12–5	Jul 2023	M15 Vejle, Denmark	WTT	Clay	(Sweden) Simon Freund	(Denmark) Carl Emil Overbeck (Denmark) Oskar Brostrøm Poulsen	6–2, 6–3
Win	13–5	Sep 2023	M25 Idanha-a-Nova, Portugal	WTT	Hard	(United Kingdom) Harry Wendelken	(Portugal) Gonçalo Falcão (Portugal) Tiago Pereira	7–6 ^{(7–3)}, 6–2
Win	14–5	Sep 2023	M25 Sintra, Portugal	WTT	Hard	(Sweden) Fred Simonsson	(Portugal) Jaime Faria (Portugal) Henrique Rocha	7–6 ^{(7–5)}, 3–6, [10–7]
Win	15–5	Sep 2023	M25 Falun, Sweden	WTT	Hard	(Sweden) Simon Freund	(United Kingdom) Harry Wendelken (United Kingdom) Anton Matusevich	7–6 ^{(7–2)}, 4–6, [10–7]
Win	16–5	Oct 2023	M25 Tavira, Portugal	WTT	Hard	(Sweden) Simon Freund	(Portugal) Gonçalo Falcão (Portugal) João Domingues	6–4, 4–6, [10–5]
Loss	16–6	Nov 2023	M15 Limassol, Cyprus	WTT	Hard	(Denmark) Elmer Møller	(Netherlands) Jurriaan Bol (Netherlands) Brian Bozemoj	6–4, 2–6, [9–11]
Win	17–6	Jan 2024	M25 Ithaca, USA	WTT	Hard (i)	(Sweden) Simon Freund	(United States) Joshua Sheehy (United States) Pranav Kumar	6–4, 7–6^{(7–4)}
Win	18–6	Jan 2024	M25 Wesley Chapel, USA	WTT	Hard	(Sweden) Simon Freund	(Colombia) Nicolás Buitrago (United States) Victor Lilov	6–4, 6–7^{(6–8)}, [10–4]
Loss	18–7	Feb 2024	M25 Faro, Portugal	WTT	Hard	(Sweden) Simon Freund	(Portugal) Tiago Pereira (Bulgaria) Alexander Donski	4–6, 6–3, [7–10]
