= 2012 São Léo Open =

- Date: 5 – 11 November
- Edition: 2nd
- Surface: Clay
- Location: São Leopoldo, Brazil

Champions

Singles
- (Argentina) Horacio Zeballos

Doubles
- (Brazil) Fabiano de Paula / (Brazil) Júlio Silva
- São Léo Open

The 2012 São Léo Open was a professional tennis tournament played on clay courts. It was the second edition of the tournament which was part of the 2012 ATP Challenger Tour. It took place in São Leopoldo, Brazil between 5 and 11 November 2012.

== Singles main draw entrants ==
=== Seeds ===
Country	Player	Rank^{1}	Seed
AUT	Andreas Haider-Maurer	100	1
SVN	Blaž Kavčič	105	2
ARG	Horacio Zeballos	119	3
BRA	Rogério Dutra da Silva	130	4
POR	Gastão Elias	133	5
BRA	João Souza	135	6
CRO	Antonio Veić	145	7
CHI	Paul Capdeville	169	8

- ^{1} Rankings are as of October 29, 2012.

=== Other entrants ===
The following players received wildcards into the singles main draw:

- (Brazil) Stefano Blatt
- (Brazil) Gabriel Friedrich
- (Brazil) Fabricio Neis
- (Brazil) João Pedro Sorgi

The following players received entry from the qualifying draw:

- (Bosnia and Herzegovina) Tomislav Brkić
- (Brazil) Wilson Leite
- (Brazil) Diego Matos
- (Germany) Alex Satschko

== Champions ==
=== Singles ===
- (Argentina) Horacio Zeballos def. (Chile) Paul Capdeville, 3–6, 7–5, 7–6^{(7–2)}

=== Doubles ===
- (Brazil) Fabiano de Paula / (Brazil) Júlio Silva def. (Uruguay) Ariel Behar / (Argentina) Horacio Zeballos, 6–1, 7–6^{(7–5)}
