= Nicolás Álvarez Varona =

Spanish tennis player (born 2001)

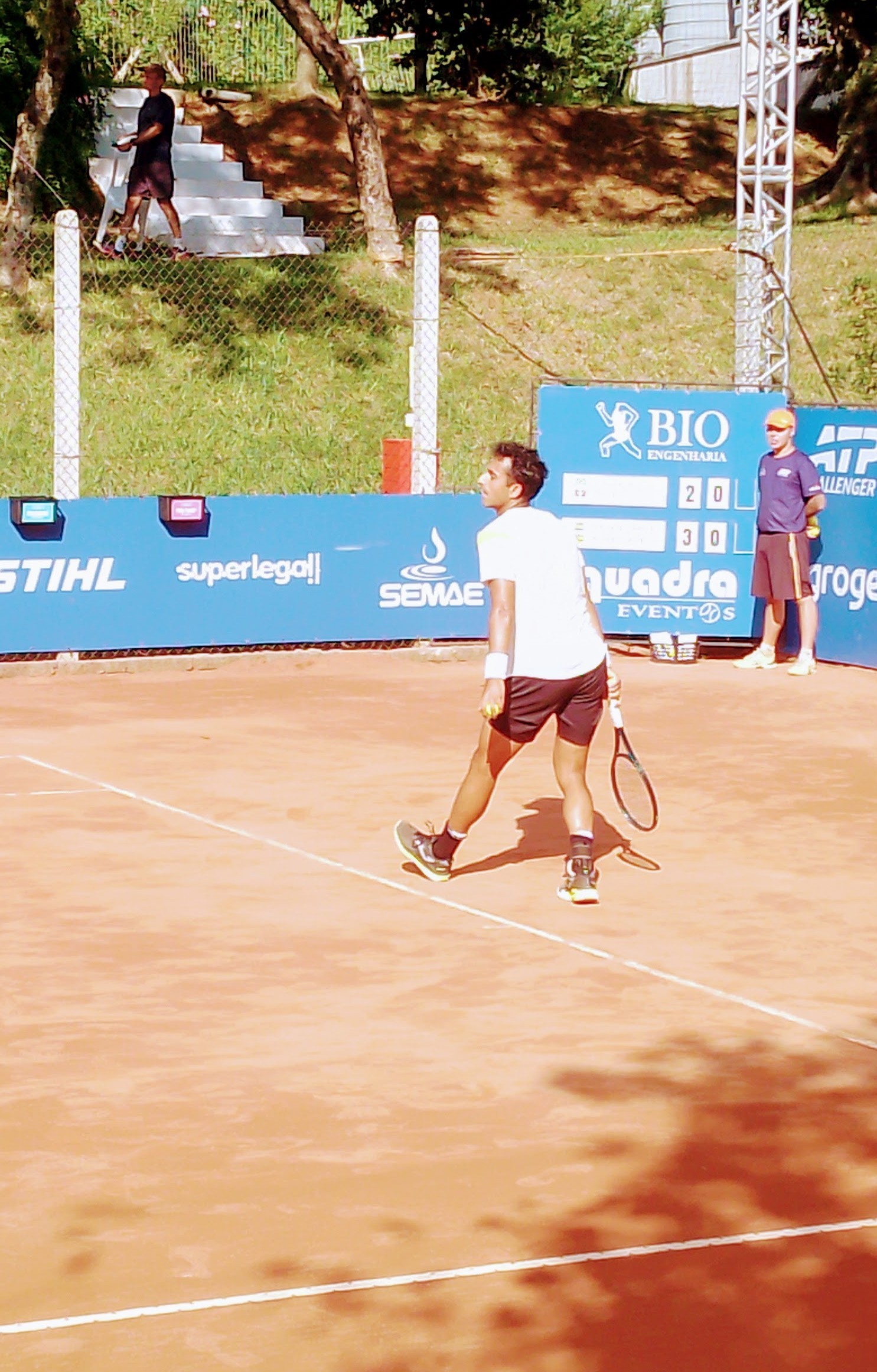
- Álvarez Varona at the 2026 São Léo Open
- Country (sports): Spain
- Born: 18 May 2001 (age 25) Burgos, Spain
- Height: 1.88 m (6 ft 2 in)
- Plays: Right-handed (two-handed backhand)
- Coach: Cristiano De Oliveira Pinto
- Prize money: $143,019

Singles
- Career record: 1–2 (at ATP Tour level, Grand Slam level, and in Davis Cup)
- Career titles: 0
- Highest ranking: No. 219 (17 October 2022)
- Current ranking: No. 469 (4 May 2026)

Doubles
- Career record: 0–0 (at ATP Tour level, Grand Slam level, and in Davis Cup)
- Career titles: 2 Challenger
- Highest ranking: No. 284 (10 April 2023)
- Current ranking: No. 466 (4 May 2026)
- Last updated on: 5 May 2026.

Nicolás Álvarez Varona (born 18 May 2001) is a Spanish tennis player. He has a career high ATP singles ranking of world No. 219 achieved on 17 October 2022. He also has a career high ATP doubles ranking of No. 284 achieved on 10 April 2023.

== Career ==
=== 2022-2024: ATP tour debut ===
Álvarez Varona made his ATP main draw debut at the 2022 Barcelona Open Banc Sabadell after qualifying for the singles main draw, defeating Philipp Kohlschreiber and wildcard Max Alcalá Gurri before losing to Brandon Nakashima.

Ranked No. 927, at the 2024 Barcelona Open Banc Sabadell he entered the qualifying competition with a wildcard.

== ATP Challenger and ITF Tour finals ==
=== Singles: 12 (4–8) ===
Legend (singles) ATP Challenger Tour (0–3) ITF WTT (4–5)	Titles by surface Hard (0–5) Clay (4–3)

Result	W–L	Date	Tournament	Tier	Surface	Opponent	Score
Loss	0–1	Jul 2019	M15 Castelo Branco, Portugal	WTT	Hard	(Colombia) Eduardo Struvay	4–6, 6–7^{(4–7)}
Loss	0–2	Oct 2019	M15 Getafe, Madrid	WTT	Hard	(United Kingdom) Anton Matusevich	5–7, 4–6
Loss	0–3	Mar 2020	M15 Monastir, Tunisia	WTT	Hard	(France) Thomas Laurent	2–6, 3–6
Win	1–3	Nov 2020	M15 Benicarló, Spain	WTT	Clay	(Russia) Ivan Gakhov	7–6^{(15–13)}, 6–4
Loss	1–4	Jun 2021	M25 Alkmaar, Netherlands	WTT	Hard	(Netherlands) Jelle Sels	1–6, 3–6
Win	2–4	Aug 2021	M25 Santander, Spain	WTT	Clay	(Spain) Àlex Martí Pujolràs	7–6^{(7–1)}, 2–6, 6–2
Loss	2–5	Dec 2021	Rio de Janeiro, Brazil	Challenger	Hard	(Japan) Kaichi Uchida	6–3, 3–6, 6–7^{(3–7)}
Loss	2–6	Aug 2022	Liberec, Czech Republic	Challenger	Clay	(Czech Republic) Jiří Lehečka	4–6, 4–6
Win	3–6	Aug 2024	M15 Gijón, Spain	WTT	Clay	(Netherlands) Ryan Nijboer	6–2, 4–6, 6–2
Win	4–6	Sep 2024	M25 Oviedo, Spain	WTT	Clay	(Spain) Daniel Mérida	7–6^{(7–3)}, 6–0
Loss	4–7	Sep 2024	M25 Sabadell, Spain	WTT	Clay	(Italy) Lorenzo Giustino	5–7, 6–3, 2–6
Loss	4–8	Jul 2025	Segovia, Spain	Challenger	Hard	(United Kingdom) George Loffhagen	6–7^{(4–7)}, 7–6^{(7–4)}, 4–6

=== Doubles: 5 (2–3) ===
Legend (singles) ATP Challenger Tour (2–3) ITF WTT (0–0)	Titles by surface Hard (1–1) Clay (1–2)

Result	W–L	Date	Tournament	Category	Surface	Partner	Opponents	Score
Win	1–0	Jul 2022	Segovia, Spain	Challenger	Hard	(Spain) Iñaki Montes de la Torre	(Zimbabwe) Benjamin Lock (Zimbabwe) Courtney John Lock	7–6^{(7–3)}, 6–3
Loss	1–1	Sep 2022	Sevilla, Spain	Challenger	Clay	(Spain) Alberto Barroso Campos	(Argentina) Román Andrés Burruchaga (Argentina) Facundo Díaz Acosta	5–7, 7–6^{(10–8)}, [7–10]
Loss	1–2	Feb 2025	Tenerife, Spain	Challenger	Hard	(Spain) Iñaki Montes de la Torre	(Spain) Íñigo Cervantes (Spain) Daniel Rincón	2–6, 4–6
Loss	1–3	Mar 2026	São Leopoldo, Brazil	Challenger	Clay	(Spain) Mario Mansilla Díez	(Bolivia) Boris Arias (Denmark) Johannes Ingildsen	3–6, 6–4, [8–10]
Win	2–3	Apr 2026	Campinas, Brazil	Challenger	Clay	(Spain) Mario Mansilla Díez	(Argentina) Mariano Kestelboim (Brazil) Marcelo Zormann	3–6, 6–1, [10–8]
