= Rio Tennis Classic =

Defunct tennis tournament
- Event name: Rio Tennis Classic
- Location: Rio de Janeiro, Brazil
- Venue: Rio de Janeiro Country Club (2017); Olympic Tennis Centre (2021); Rio Tennis Academy (2022)
- Category: ATP Challenger Tour
- Surface: Hard (2021); Clay (2017, 2022)
- Draw: 32S/32Q/16D
- Prize money: $53,120

The Rio Tennis Classic was a professional tennis tournament played on hardcourts. It was part of the Association of Tennis Professionals (ATP) Challenger Tour. The tournament took place in Rio de Janeiro, Brazil. The event was cancelled due lack of sponsors in 2018 and returned with another venue and surface in 2021.

In 2022, the event was called Challenger Rio de Janeiro and was held on the clay courts of the Rio Tennis Academy.

== Past finals ==
=== Singles ===
Year	Champion	Runner-up	Score
2021	(Japan) Kaichi Uchida	(Spain) Nicolás Álvarez Varona	3–6, 6–3, 7–6^{(7–3)}
2018–2020	Not held		
2017	(Argentina) Carlos Berlocq	(Spain) Jaume Munar	6–4, 2–6, 3–0 ret.

=== Doubles ===
Year	Champions	Runners-up	Score
2021	(Brazil) Orlando Luz (Brazil) Rafael Matos	(United States) James Cerretani (Brazil) Fernando Romboli	6–3, 7–6^{(7–2)}
2018–2020	Not held		
2017	(Argentina) Máximo González (Brazil) Fabrício Neis	(El Salvador) Marcelo Arévalo (Mexico) Miguel Ángel Reyes-Varela	5–7, 6–4, [10–4]
