= Mario Mansilla Díez =

Spanish tennis player (born 2002)

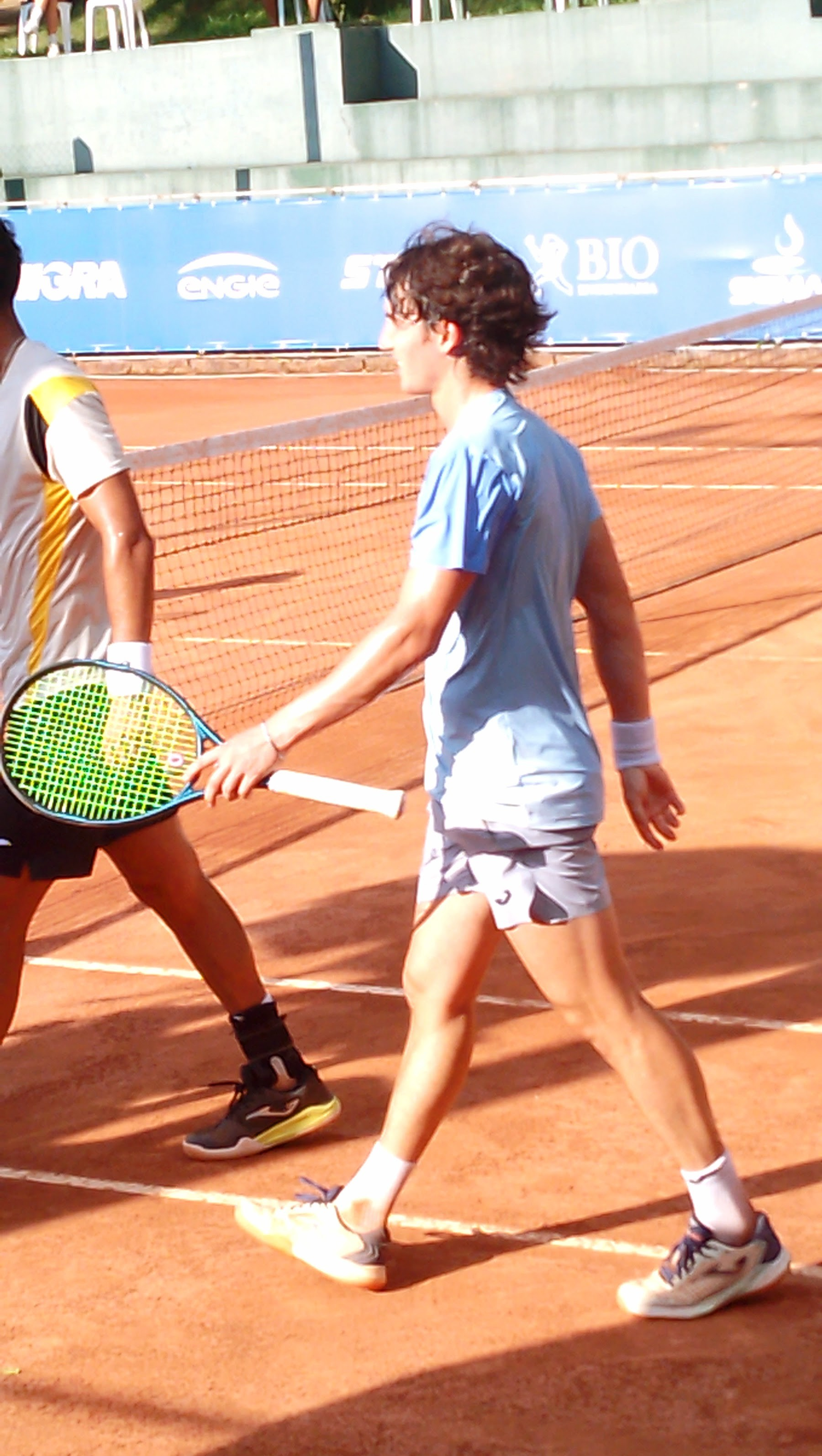
- Mansilla Díez at the 2026 São Léo Open
- Country (sports): Spain
- Born: 12 May 2002 (age 24) Burgos, Spain
- Height: 1.80 m (5 ft 11 in)
- Plays: Right-handed (two-handed backhand)
- Coach: Cristiano Oliveira
- Prize money: US $65,826

Singles
- Career record: 0–0 (at ATP Tour level, Grand Slam level, and in Davis Cup)
- Career titles: 0
- Highest ranking: No. 816 (26 September 2022)
- Current ranking: No. 1,758 (26 October 2026)

Doubles
- Career record: 0–0 (at ATP Tour level, Grand Slam level, and in Davis Cup)
- Career titles: 2 Challenger, 7 ITF
- Highest ranking: No. 147 (26 October 2026)
- Current ranking: No. 147 (26 October 2026)
- Last updated on: 26 October 2026.

Mario Mansilla Díez (born 12 May 2002) is a Spanish tennis player. Mansilla Díez has a career high ATP singles ranking of No. 816 achieved on 26 September 2022 and a career high ATP doubles ranking of No. 147 achieved on 26 October 2026.

Mansilla Díez has won one ATP Challenger doubles title.
