= Johan Nikles =

Swiss tennis player (born 1997)

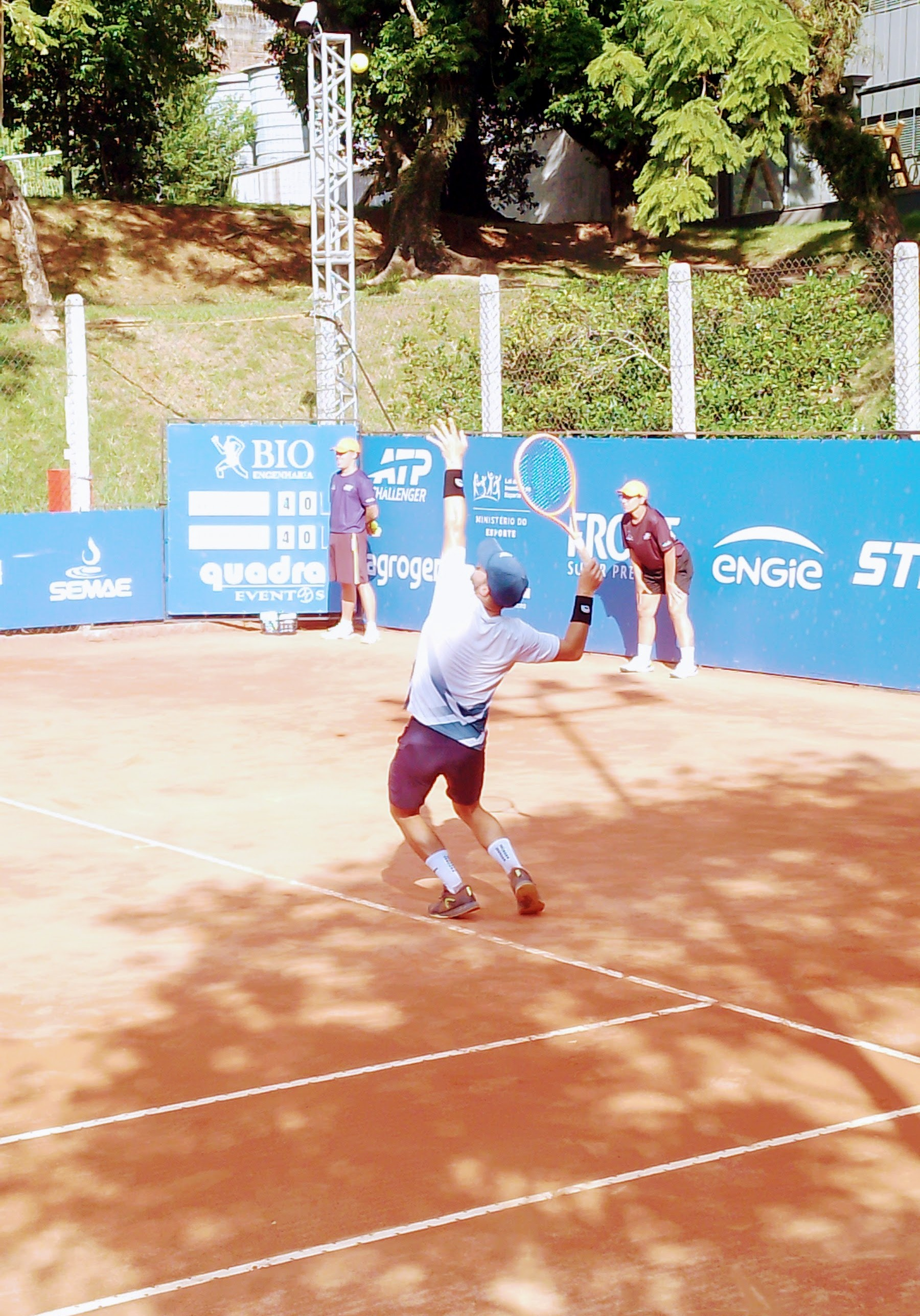
- Nikles at the 2026 São Léo Open
- Country (sports): Switzerland
- Residence: Geneva, Switzerland
- Born: 23 March 1997 (age 29) Geneva, Switzerland
- Height: 1.73 m (5 ft 8 in)
- Plays: Right-handed (two-handed backhand)
- Coach: Antony Dupuis, José Ferrol Garcia
- Prize money: US $204,318

Singles
- Career record: 1–3 (at ATP Tour level, Grand Slam level, and in Davis Cup)
- Career titles: 0
- Highest ranking: No. 256 (11 July 2022)
- Current ranking: No. 397 (14 September 2026)

Grand Slam singles results
- Australian Open Junior: 1R (2015)
- French Open Junior: 1R (2015)
- Wimbledon Junior: 3R (2015)
- US Open Junior: 1R (2015)

Doubles
- Career record: 1–3 (at ATP Tour level, Grand Slam level, and in Davis Cup)
- Career titles: 0
- Highest ranking: No. 357 (3 October 2022)
- Current ranking: No. 406 (14 September 2026)

Grand Slam doubles results
- Australian Open Junior: 2R (2015)
- French Open Junior: QF (2015)
- Wimbledon Junior: 1R (2015)
- US Open Junior: 1R (2015)
- Last updated on: 18 September 2026.

Johan Nikles (born 23 March 1997) is a Swiss tennis player. Nikles has a career-high ATP singles ranking of World No. 256 achieved on 11 July 2022 and a career-high ATP doubles ranking of World No. 357 achieved on 3 October 2022.

On the junior tour, Nikles had a career-high ITF junior ranking of No. 26 achieved in January 2015.

== Career ==
=== 2016: ATP debut ===
Nikles made his ATP main draw debut at the 2016 Swiss Open Gstaad, receiving a singles main draw wildcard.

=== 2022: Top 300 debut ===
He qualified for the 2022 Geneva Open, defeating 3rd seed Peter Gojowczyk and 8th seed Lukáš Rosol, and won his first ATP singles main draw match against compatriot wildcard Leandro Riedi, saving three match points. He lost to Tallon Griekspoor in the second round. As a result he moved 40 positions up into the top 300.
