= São Léo Open =

- 2026 São Léo Open

ATP Challenger Tour
- Location: São Leopoldo; Brazil
- Category: ATP Challenger Tour
- Surface: Clay / Outdoors
- Draw: 32S/32Q/16D
- Prize money: $82,000
- Website: Website

The São Léo Open de Tênis is a professional tennis tournament held in São Leopoldo, Brazil since 2011. The event is part of the ATP Challenger Tour and is played on outdoor clay courts.

== Past finals ==
=== Singles ===
Year	Champion	Runner-up	Score
2026	(Argentina) Facundo Díaz Acosta	(Bolivia) Hugo Dellien	5–7, 6–2, 6–4
2025	Not held		
2024	(Paraguay) Daniel Vallejo	(France) Enzo Couacaud	6–3, 6–2
2023	Not held		
2022	(Peru) Juan Pablo Varillas	(Argentina) Facundo Bagnis	7–6^{(7–5)}, 4–6, 6–4
2013–21	Not held		
2012	(Argentina) Horacio Zeballos	(Chile) Paul Capdeville	3–6, 7–5, 7–6^{(7–2)}
2011	(Argentina) Leonardo Mayer	(Serbia) Nikola Ćirić	7–5, 7–6^{(7–1)}

=== Doubles ===
Year	Champions	Runners-up	Score
2026	(Bolivia) Boris Arias (Denmark) Johannes Ingildsen	(Spain) Nicolás Álvarez Varona (Spain) Mario Mansilla Díez	6–3, 4–6, [10–8]
2025	Not held		
2024	(Brazil) Marcelo Demoliner (Brazil) Orlando Luz	(Canada) Liam Draxl (Italy) Alexander Weis	7–5, 3–6, [10–8]
2023	Not held		
2022	(Argentina) Guido Andreozzi (Argentina) Guillermo Durán	(Brazil) Felipe Meligeni Alves (Brazil) João Lucas Reis da Silva	5–1 ret.
2013–21	Not held		
2012	(Brazil) Fabiano de Paula (Brazil) Júlio Silva	(Uruguay) Ariel Behar (Argentina) Horacio Zeballos	6–1, 7–6^{(7–5)}
2011	(Brazil) Franco Ferreiro (Spain) Rubén Ramírez Hidalgo	(Portugal) Gastão Elias (Portugal) Frederico Gil	6–7^{(4–7)}, 6–3, [11–9]
