= 2024 Brasil Tennis Challenger – Doubles =

Doubles
- 2024 Brasil Tennis Challenger

Final
- Champions: (Argentina) Guido Andreozzi (Argentina) Guillermo Durán
- Runners-up: (Brazil) Daniel Dutra da Silva (Brazil) Pedro Sakamoto
- Score: 6–2, 7–6^{(7–5)}

Events
Singles	Doubles
← 2023 ·	Brasil Tennis Challenger	· 2025 →

Orlando Luz and Marcelo Zormann were the defending champions but lost in the first round to Mariano Kestelboim and Juan Bautista Torres.

Guido Andreozzi and Guillermo Durán won the title after defeating Daniel Dutra da Silva and Pedro Sakamoto 6–2, 7–6^{(7–5)} in the final.

== Seeds ==
1. (Argentina) Guido Andreozzi / (Argentina) Guillermo Durán (champions)
2. (Brazil) Orlando Luz / (Brazil) Marcelo Zormann (first round)
3. (Argentina) Federico Agustín Gómez / (Argentina) Renzo Olivo (withdrew)
4. (Brazil) Mateus Alves / (Brazil) Eduardo Ribeiro (semifinals)

== Draw ==
Key

- Q = Qualifier
- WC = Wild card
- LL = Lucky loser
- Alt = Alternate
- ITF = ITF entry
- PR = Protected ranking
- SR = Special ranking
- SE = Special exempt
- JE = Junior exempt
- JR = Junior Accelerator Programme entrant
- CO = College Accelerator Programme entrant
- NG = Next Gen Accelerator Program entrant
- w/o = Walkover
- r = Retired
- d = Defaulted

First round
1	(Argentina) G Andreozzi (Argentina) G Durán	2	6	[10]
(Brazil) L Britto (Brazil) PA Saraiva dos Santos	6	3	[6]
(Argentina) H Casanova (Argentina) S Rodríguez Taverna
(Spain) N Sánchez Izquierdo (Spain) C Taberner	w/o
Alt	(Spain) Àlex Martí Pujolràs (Italy) Alexander Weis	6	7^{7}
WC	(Brazil) Enrique Bogo (Brazil) Rafael Tosetto	4	6^{4}
WC	(Brazil) Matheus Bueres (Brazil) Enzo Camargo Lima	w/o
(Italy) M Cecchinato (Italy) A Giannessi
Alt	(Brazil) Igor Gimenez (Brazil) Nicolas Zanellato	4	6	[8]
(Brazil) M Pucinelli de Almeida (Brazil) JL Reis da Silva	6	3	[10]
(Argentina) G Villanueva (Switzerland) D Wenger	6	6^{3}	[10]
4	(Brazil) M Alves (Brazil) E Ribeiro	2	7^{7}	[12]
(Argentina) A Barrena (Argentina) JP Ficovich	1	4
(Brazil) D Dutra da Silva (Brazil) P Sakamoto	6	6
(Argentina) M Kestelboim (Argentina) JB Torres	6	3	[10]
2	(Brazil) O Luz (Brazil) M Zormann	2	6	[8]

Quarterfinals
1	(Argentina) G Andreozzi (Argentina) G Durán	w/o
(Spain) N Sánchez Izquierdo (Spain) C Taberner
Alt	(Spain) À Martí Pujolràs (Italy) A Weis	6	7
WC	(Brazil) M Bueres (Brazil) E Camargo Lima	3	5
(Brazil) M Pucinelli de Almeida (Brazil) JL Reis da Silva
4	(Brazil) M Alves (Brazil) E Ribeiro	w/o
(Brazil) D Dutra da Silva (Brazil) P Sakamoto	w/o
(Argentina) M Kestelboim (Argentina) JB Torres

Semifinals
1	(Argentina) G Andreozzi (Argentina) G Durán	6	5	[11]
Alt	(Spain) À Martí Pujolràs (Italy) A Weis	2	7	[9]
4	(Brazil) M Alves (Brazil) E Ribeiro	7	5	[8]
(Brazil) D Dutra da Silva (Brazil) P Sakamoto	5	7	[10]

Final
1	(Argentina) G Andreozzi (Argentina) G Durán	6	7^{7}
(Brazil) D Dutra da Silva (Brazil) P Sakamoto	2	6^{5}
