= 2023 Brasil Tennis Challenger – Singles =

Singles
- 2023 Brasil Tennis Challenger

Final
- Champion: (Argentina) Andrea Collarini
- Runner-up: (Chile) Tomás Barrios Vera
- Score: 6–2, 7–6^{(7–1)}

Events
Singles	Doubles
Brasil Tennis Challenger	· 2024 →

This was the first edition of the tournament.

Andrea Collarini won the title after defeating Tomás Barrios Vera 6–2, 7–6^{(7–1)} in the final.

== Seeds ==
1. (Chile) Alejandro Tabilo (quarterfinals)
2. (Argentina) Camilo Ugo Carabelli (semifinals)
3. (Argentina) Juan Manuel Cerúndolo (withdrew)
4. (Brazil) Felipe Meligeni Alves (second round)
5. (Argentina) Renzo Olivo (semifinals)
6. (Argentina) Facundo Díaz Acosta (withdrew)
7. (Brazil) Matheus Pucinelli de Almeida (first round, retired)
8. (Argentina) Genaro Alberto Olivieri (first round)
9. (Chile) Tomás Barrios Vera (final)

== Draw ==
=== Key ===
- Q = Qualifier
- WC = Wild card
- LL = Lucky loser
- Alt = Alternate
- SE = Special exempt
- PR = Protected ranking
- ITF = ITF entry
- JE = Junior exempt
- w/o = Walkover
- r = Retired
- d = Defaulted
- SR = Special ranking

=== Finals ===
Semifinals
(Argentina) Andrea Collarini	6	2	6
5	(Argentina) Renzo Olivo	4	6	4
9	(Chile) Tomás Barrios Vera	6	2	6
2	(Argentina) Camilo Ugo Carabelli	2	6	4

Final
(Argentina) Andrea Collarini	6	7^{7}
9	(Chile) Tomás Barrios Vera	2	6^{1}

=== Top half ===
First round
1	(Chile) A Tabilo	6	6
WC	(Brazil) P Boscardin Dias	2	3
Q	(Bolivia) M Dellien	1	6	3
(Spain) O Roca Batalla	6	4	6
LL	(Spain) C Sánchez Jover	6	6
Q	(South Korea) Y-s Chung	3	0
(Argentina) A Collarini	6	7
8	(Argentina) GA Olivieri	3	5
4	(Brazil) F Meligeni Alves	6	6
(Chile) G Lama	4	4
Alt	(France) T Atmane	6	6
LL	(Tunisia) M Echargui	1	2
WC	(Brazil) JL Reis da Silva	6	4	3
(United States) E Zhu	4	6	6
(Germany) Timo Stodder	4	3
5	(Argentina) R Olivo	6	6

Second round
1	(Chile) A Tabilo	6	6
(Spain) O Roca Batalla	3	4
LL	(Spain) C Sánchez Jover	3	2
(Argentina) A Collarini	6	6
4	(Brazil) F Meligeni Alves	4	5
Alt	(France) T Atmane	6	7
(United States) E Zhu	4	3
5	(Argentina) R Olivo	6	6

Quarterfinals
1	(Chile) A Tabilo	6^{6}	4
(Argentina) A Collarini	7^{8}	6
Alt	(France) T Atmane	6^{2}	2
5	(Argentina) R Olivo	7^{7}	6

Semifinals
(Argentina) A Collarini	6	2	6
5	(Argentina) R Olivo	4	6	4

=== Bottom half ===
First round
9	(Chile) T Barrios Vera	6	7
WC	(Brazil) E Ribeiro	3	5
(Argentina) F Comesaña	6	6
(Argentina) M Navone	1	3
Q	(Ukraine) O Prihodko	1	0
(Argentina) H Casanova	6	6
Alt	(Brazil) D Dutra da Silva	3	1
Q	(Italy) Edoardo Lavagno	6	6
7	(Brazil) M Pucinelli de Almeida	6	0^{r}
(Colombia) N Mejía	2	2
Q	(Brazil) T Seyboth Wild	6	6
(Argentina) JB Torres	2	2
Q	Andrey Chepelev	1	4
(Netherlands) J de Jong	6	6
(Italy) A Giannessi	4	6	1
2	(Argentina) C Ugo Carabelli	6	3	6

Second round
9	(Chile) T Barrios Vera	6	6
(Argentina) F Comesaña	3	1
(Argentina) H Casanova	6	4	7^{7}
Q	(Italy) E Lavagno	4	6	6^{5}
(Colombia) N Mejía	6^{2}	1
Q	(Brazil) T Seyboth Wild	7^{7}	6
(Netherlands) J de Jong	6^{0}	1
2	(Argentina) C Ugo Carabelli	7^{7}	6

Quarterfinals
9	(Chile) T Barrios Vera	6	6
(Argentina) H Casanova	1	1
Q	(Brazil) T Seyboth Wild	6^{5}	4
2	(Argentina) C Ugo Carabelli	7^{7}	6

Semifinals
9	(Chile) T Barrios Vera	6	2	6
2	(Argentina) C Ugo Carabelli	2	6	4
