= 2025 Brasil Tennis Challenger – Singles =

Singles
- 2025 Brasil Tennis Challenger

Final
- Champion: (Argentina) Román Andrés Burruchaga
- Runner-up: (Argentina) Facundo Mena
- Score: 7–6^{(10–8)}, 6–7^{(6–8)}, 7–6^{(7–4)}

Events
| Singles | Doubles |
- Brasil Tennis Challenger

Camilo Ugo Carabelli was the defending champion but retired from his quarterfinals match against Román Andrés Burruchaga.

Burruchaga won the title after defeating Facundo Mena 7–6^{(10–8)}, 6–7^{(6–8)}, 7–6^{(7–4)} in the second-longest Challenger final in history.

== Seeds ==
1. (Argentina) Camilo Ugo Carabelli (quarterfinals, retired)
2. (Argentina) Federico Coria (quarterfinals)
3. (Bolivia) Hugo Dellien (semifinals)
4. (Colombia) Daniel Elahi Galán (second round)
5. (Brazil) Felipe Meligeni Alves (first round)
6. (Argentina) Román Andrés Burruchaga (champion)
7. (Brazil) Gustavo Heide (semifinals)
8. (Bolivia) Murkel Dellien (first round)

== Draw ==
Key

- Q = Qualifier
- WC = Wild card
- LL = Lucky loser
- Alt = Alternate
- ITF = ITF entry
- PR = Protected ranking
- SR = Special ranking
- SE = Special exempt
- JE = Junior exempt
- JR = Junior Accelerator Programme entrant
- CO = College Accelerator Programme entrant
- NG = Next Gen Accelerator Program entrant
- w/o = Walkover
- r = Retired
- d = Defaulted

=== Finals ===
Semifinals
6 | (Argentina) Román Andrés Burruchaga | 7 | 3 | 7^{7}
7 | (Brazil) Gustavo Heide | 5 | 6 | 6^{0}
3 | (Bolivia) Hugo Dellien | 6 | 3 | 0
(Argentina) Facundo Mena | 3 | 6 | 6

Final
6 | (Argentina) Román Andrés Burruchaga | 7^{10} | 6^{6} | 7^{7}
(Argentina) Facundo Mena | 6^{8} | 7^{8} | 6^{4}

=== Top half ===
First round
1 | (Argentina) C Ugo Carabelli | 6 | 6
WC | (Brazil) JL Reis da Silva | 1 | 2
Q | (Argentina) L Midón | 3 | 6 | 3
(Argentina) A Collarini | 6 | 0 | 6
LL | (Italy) M Cecchinato | 6 | 3 | 4
(Brazil) M Alves | 4 | 6 | 6
(Argentina) GA Olivieri | 4 | 3
6 | (Argentina) RA Burruchaga | 6 | 6
4 | (Colombia) DE Galán | 7 | 4 | 6
Q | (Argentina) V Aboian | 5 | 6 | 3
Q | (Spain) Àlex Martí Pujolràs | 3 | 7^{7} | 1
(Spain) C Taberner | 6 | 6^{5} | 6
(France) G Debru | 7^{8} | 6
Alt | (Argentina) R Olivo | 6^{6} | 4
(Netherlands) M Houkes | 3 | 2
7 | (Brazil) G Heide | 6 | 6

Second round
1 | (Argentina) C Ugo Carabelli | 6 | 6
(Argentina) A Collarini | 4 | 4
(Brazil) M Alves | 6^{3} | 6 | 3
6 | (Argentina) RA Burruchaga | 7^{7} | 4 | 6
4 | (Colombia) DE Galán | 5 | 6^{6}
(Spain) C Taberner | 7 | 7^{8}
(France) G Debru | 3 | 3
7 | (Brazil) G Heide | 6 | 6

Quarterfinals
1 | (Argentina) C Ugo Carabelli | 5 | 5^{r}
6 | (Argentina) RA Burruchaga | 7 | 4
(Spain) C Taberner | 6^{8} | 3
7 | (Brazil) G Heide | 7^{10} | 6

Semifinals
6 | (Argentina) RA Burruchaga | 7 | 3 | 7^{7}
7 | (Brazil) G Heide | 5 | 6 | 6^{0}

=== Bottom half ===
First round
8 | (Bolivia) M Dellien | 3 | 6 | 6^{5}
(United States) Em Nava | 6 | 4 | 7^{7}
(Argentina) S Rodríguez Taverna | 3 | 6 | 2
(Argentina) JP Ficovich | 6 | 3 | 6
WC | (Brazil) P Sakamoto | 7 | 6
Q | (Austria) J Schwärzler | 5 | 1
Q | (France) M Chazal | 4 | 4
3 | (Bolivia) H Dellien | 6 | 6
5 | (Brazil) F Meligeni Alves | 6 | 6^{1} | 2
(Argentina) F Mena | 4 | 7^{7} | 6
(Italy) A Pellegrino | 6 | 4 | 6
(Brazil) D Dutra da Silva | 2 | 6 | 3
Q | (Spain) N Sánchez Izquierdo | 3 | 6 | 6
(Bolivia) JC Prado Ángelo | 6 | 3 | 4
(Argentina) JB Torres | 5 | 3
2 | (Argentina) F Coria | 7 | 6

Second round
(United States) Em Nava | 6^{13} | 7^{7} | 3
(Argentina) JP Ficovich | 7^{15} | 6^{2} | 6
WC | (Brazil) P Sakamoto | 6^{7} | 6 | 6^{6}
3 | (Bolivia) H Dellien | 7^{9} | 4 | 7^{8}
(Argentina) F Mena | 6 | 7^{7}
(Italy) A Pellegrino | 4 | 6^{3}
Q | (Spain) N Sánchez Izquierdo | 3 | 5
2 | (Argentina) F Coria | 6 | 7

Quarterfinals
(Argentina) JP Ficovich | 5 | 5
3 | (Bolivia) H Dellien | 7 | 7
(Argentina) F Mena | 7^{7} | 6
2 | (Argentina) F Coria | 6^{2} | 3

Semifinals
3 | (Bolivia) H Dellien | 6 | 3 | 0
(Argentina) F Mena | 3 | 6 | 6
