= 2026 Piracicaba Challenger – Singles =

Singles
- 2026 Piracicaba Challenger

Final
- Champion: (Brazil) Thiago Seyboth Wild
- Runner-up: (Argentina) Gonzalo Villanueva
- Score: 6–2, 6–2

Events
Singles	Doubles
- Piracicaba Challenger

Román Andrés Burruchaga was the defending champion but chose not to defend his title.

Thiago Seyboth Wild won the title after defeating Gonzalo Villanueva 6–2, 6–2 in the final.

== Seeds ==
1. (Argentina) Juan Bautista Torres (second round)
2. (Argentina) Juan Manuel La Serna (semifinals)
3. (Brazil) Thiago Seyboth Wild (champion)
4. (Chile) Matías Soto (second round)
5. (Argentina) Luciano Emanuel Ambrogi (first round)
6. (Dominican Republic) Nick Hardt (quarterfinals, retired)
7. (Argentina) Nicolás Kicker (quarterfinals, retired)
8. (Brazil) Eduardo Ribeiro (first round)

== Draw ==
Key

- Q = Qualifier
- WC = Wild card
- LL = Lucky loser
- Alt = Alternate
- ITF = ITF entry
- PR = Protected ranking
- SR = Special ranking
- SE = Special exempt
- JE = Junior exempt
- JR = Junior Accelerator Programme entrant
- CO = College Accelerator Programme entrant
- NG = Next Gen Accelerator Program entrant
- w/o = Walkover
- r = Retired
- d = Defaulted

=== Finals ===
Semifinals
(Brazil) Matheus Pucinelli de Almeida	6	5	1
(Argentina) Gonzalo Villanueva	3	7	6
3	(Brazil) Thiago Seyboth Wild	6	6
2	(Argentina) Juan Manuel La Serna	3	3

Final
(Argentina) Gonzalo Villanueva	2	2
3	(Brazil) Thiago Seyboth Wild	6	6

=== Top half ===
First round
1	(Argentina) JB Torres	3	6	6
(Mexico) A Hernández	6	2	0
(Uruguay) J Aguilar Cardozo	6	6
(Argentina) Juan Estévez	2	3
Q	(Brazil) Gustavo Ribeiro de Almeida	5	3
(Brazil) PA Saraiva dos Santos	7	6
(Brazil) M Pucinelli de Almeida	6^{3}	6	6
5	(Argentina) LE Ambrogi	7^{7}	3	1
4	(Chile) M Soto	6	6
(Argentina) Ignacio Monzón	3	1
(Argentina) G Villanueva	1	6	6
(Chile) Nicolás Villalón	6	3	1
(Argentina) V Aboian	6	6
Q	(Argentina) Valentín Basel	4	2
(Argentina) H Casanova	7	6
8	(Brazil) E Ribeiro	5	2

Second round
1	(Argentina) JB Torres	3	4
(Uruguay) J Aguilar Cardozo	6	6
(Brazil) PA Saraiva dos Santos	3	6	2
(Brazil) M Pucinelli de Almeida	6	4	6
4	(Chile) M Soto	6	3	5
(Argentina) G Villanueva	4	6	7
(Argentina) V Aboian	6	4	6
(Argentina) H Casanova	2	6	4

Quarterfinals
(Uruguay) J Aguilar Cardozo	6^{3}	2
(Brazil) M Pucinelli de Almeida	7^{7}	6
(Argentina) G Villanueva	6	6
(Argentina) V Aboian	1	1

Semifinals
(Brazil) M Pucinelli de Almeida	6	5	1
(Argentina) G Villanueva	3	7	6

=== Bottom half ===
First round
7	(Argentina) N Kicker	7^{7}	4	6
(Brazil) Bruno Fernandez	6^{1}	6	4
(Argentina) Máximo Zeitune	6^{4}	6	4
Q	(Brazil) Nicolas Zanellato	7^{7}	3	6
Q	(Brazil) Lucas Andrade da Silva	6	6
Alt	(Peru) C Huertas del Pino	4	3
WC	(Brazil) LF Miguel	6	3	2
3	(Brazil) T Seyboth Wild	2	6	6
6	(Dominican Republic) N Hardt	2	6	6
Q	(Brazil) Nicolas Oliveira	6	4	4
Q	(Brazil) Wilson Leite	6	6
WC	(Brazil) Filipe Bullamah	0	3
LL	(Argentina) Thiago Cigarrán	6^{9}	6	2
(Argentina) S Rodríguez Taverna	7^{11}	3	6
WC	(Brazil) Enzo Kohlmann de Freitas	4	7^{7}	4
2	(Argentina) JM La Serna	6	6^{1}	6

Second round
7	(Argentina) N Kicker	7	6
Q	(Brazil) N Zanellato	5	4
Q	(Brazil) L Andrade da Silva	6^{3}	6^{6}
3	(Brazil) T Seyboth Wild	7^{7}	7^{8}
6	(Dominican Republic) N Hardt	6	6
Q	(Brazil) W Leite	3	1
(Argentina) S Rodríguez Taverna	2	0^{r}
2	(Argentina) JM La Serna	6	1

Quarterfinals
7	(Argentina) N Kicker	0	0^{r}
3	(Brazil) T Seyboth Wild	6	1
6	(Dominican Republic) N Hardt	2	0^{r}
2	(Argentina) JM La Serna	6	3

Semifinals
3	(Brazil) T Seyboth Wild	6	6
2	(Argentina) JM La Serna	3	3
