= 2024 Brasil Tennis Challenger – Singles =

Singles
- 2024 Brasil Tennis Challenger

Final
- Champion: (Argentina) Camilo Ugo Carabelli
- Runner-up: (Argentina) Federico Coria
- Score: 7–5, 6–4

Events
Singles	Doubles
- Brasil Tennis Challenger

Andrea Collarini was the defending champion but chose not to defend his title.

Camilo Ugo Carabelli won the title after defeating Federico Coria 7–5, 6–4 in the final.

== Seeds ==
1. (Argentina) Federico Coria (final)
2. (Argentina) Camilo Ugo Carabelli (champion)
3. Ivan Gakhov (quarterfinals)
4. (Argentina) Santiago Rodríguez Taverna (first round)
5. (Italy) Marco Cecchinato (second round)
6. (Italy) Alessandro Giannessi (first round, retired)
7. (Italy) Edoardo Lavagno (second round)
8. (Argentina) Juan Pablo Ficovich (first round)

== Draw ==
Key

- Q = Qualifier
- WC = Wild card
- LL = Lucky loser
- Alt = Alternate
- ITF = ITF entry
- PR = Protected ranking
- SR = Special ranking
- SE = Special exempt
- JE = Junior exempt
- JR = Junior Accelerator Programme entrant
- CO = College Accelerator Programme entrant
- NG = Next Gen Accelerator Program entrant
- w/o = Walkover
- r = Retired
- d = Defaulted

=== Finals ===
Semifinals
1	(Argentina) Federico Coria	7	7^{8}
(Brazil) Matheus Pucinelli de Almeida	5	6^{6}
(United Kingdom) Felix Gill	3	0
2	(Argentina) Camilo Ugo Carabelli	6	6

Final
1	(Argentina) Federico Coria	5	4
2	(Argentina) Camilo Ugo Carabelli	7	6

=== Top half ===
First round
1	(Argentina) F Coria	6	7
(Argentina) R Olivo	1	5
(Argentina) JB Torres	6	2	7^{7}
(Brazil) JL Reis da Silva	4	6	6^{5}
(Argentina) H Casanova	6	6
Q	(Argentina) G Villanueva	2	4
(Italy) G Mager	6	1
6	(Italy) A Giannessi	3	1^{r}
4	(Argentina) S Rodríguez Taverna	6	4	5
Q	(Brazil) D Dutra da Silva	4	6	7
(Italy) Alexander Weis	4	6	6
Q	(Argentina) FA Gómez	6	4	3
Q	(Switzerland) D Wenger	2	4
(Brazil) M Pucinelli de Almeida	6	6
Q	(Argentina) A Barrena	2	7^{7}	2
7	(Italy) Edoardo Lavagno	6	6^{0}	6

Second round
1	(Argentina) F Coria	6	3
(Argentina) JB Torres	0	0^{r}
(Argentina) H Casanova	6	1	6^{4}
(Italy) G Mager	2	6	7^{7}
Q	(Brazil) D Dutra da Silva	3	3
(Italy) A Weis	6	6
(Brazil) M Pucinelli de Almeida	6	6
7	(Italy) E Lavagno	1	3

Quarterfinals
1	(Argentina) F Coria	6	4	6
(Italy) G Mager	0	6	3
(Italy) A Weis	6^{3}	6^{4}
(Brazil) M Pucinelli de Almeida	7^{7}	7^{7}

Semifinals
1	(Argentina) F Coria	7	7^{8}
(Brazil) M Pucinelli de Almeida	5	6^{6}

=== Bottom half ===
First round
5	(Italy) M Cecchinato	6	6
(Argentina) G Andreozzi	3	4
(Brazil) O Luz	6^{3}	6^{5}
(United Kingdom) F Gill	7^{7}	7^{7}
Alt	(South Korea) G Campaña Lee	7	6
(Brazil) P Sakamoto	5	1
WC	(Brazil) E Ribeiro	3	3
3	I Gakhov	6	6
8	(Argentina) JP Ficovich	5	7	4
(Germany) Timo Stodder	7	5	6
(Spain) N Sánchez Izquierdo	4	4
Q	(Switzerland) K Feldbausch	6	6
WC	(Brazil) Nicolas Zanellato	5	2
WC	(Brazil) M Alves	7	6
(Spain) C Taberner	6^{3}	2
2	(Argentina) C Ugo Carabelli	7^{7}	6

Second round
5	(Italy) M Cecchinato	5	4
(United Kingdom) F Gill	7	6
Alt	(South Korea) G Campaña Lee	4	4
3	I Gakhov	6	6
(Germany) T Stodder	6^{3}	1
Q	(Switzerland) K Feldbausch	7^{7}	6
WC	(Brazil) M Alves	2	2
2	(Argentina) C Ugo Carabelli	6	6

Quarterfinals
(United Kingdom) F Gill	6	7^{7}
3	I Gakhov	0	6^{3}
Q	(Switzerland) K Feldbausch	1	4
2	(Argentina) C Ugo Carabelli	6	6

Semifinals
(United Kingdom) F Gill	3	0
2	(Argentina) C Ugo Carabelli	6	6
