= 2025 Brasil Tennis Challenger – Doubles =

Doubles
- 2025 Brasil Tennis Challenger

Final
- Champions: (Argentina) Guido Andreozzi (Brazil) Orlando Luz
- Runners-up: (Brazil) Marcelo Demoliner (Brazil) Fernando Romboli
- Score: 6–7^{(4–7)}, 6–2, [11–9]

Events
Singles	Doubles
- Brasil Tennis Challenger

Guido Andreozzi and Guillermo Durán were the defending champions but only Andreozzi chose to defend his title, partnering Orlando Luz. He successfully defended his title after defeating Marcelo Demoliner and Fernando Romboli 6–7^{(4–7)}, 6–2, [11–9] in the final.

== Seeds ==
1. (Argentina) Guido Andreozzi / (Brazil) Orlando Luz (champions)
2. (Brazil) Marcelo Demoliner / (Brazil) Fernando Romboli (final)
3. (Brazil) Luís Britto / (Brazil) Marcelo Zormann (semifinals)
4. (Brazil) Mateus Alves / (Brazil) Daniel Dutra da Silva (first round, withdrew)

== Draw ==
Key

- Q = Qualifier
- WC = Wild card
- LL = Lucky loser
- Alt = Alternate
- ITF = ITF entry
- PR = Protected ranking
- SR = Special ranking
- SE = Special exempt
- JE = Junior exempt
- JR = Junior Accelerator Programme entrant
- CO = College Accelerator Programme entrant
- NG = Next Gen Accelerator Program entrant
- w/o = Walkover
- r = Retired
- d = Defaulted

=== Draw ===
First round
1	(Argentina) G Andreozzi (Brazil) O Luz	w/o
(Colombia) DE Galán (Spain) C Taberner
(Bolivia) M Dellien (Bolivia) JC Prado Ángelo	7^{7}	7^{7}
(Brazil) G Heide (Brazil) JL Reis da Silva	6^{3}	6^{0}
4	(Brazil) M Alves (Brazil) D Dutra da Silva
(France) G Debru (Italy) A Pellegrino	w/o
PR	(Argentina) Leonardo Aboian (Peru) A Huertas del Pino	2
WC	(Italy) M Cecchinato (Brazil) P Sakamoto	1^{r}
Alt	(Brazil) Victor Hugo Remondy Pagotto (Brazil) Gabriel Tumasonis	w/o
Alt	(Brazil) P Boscardin Dias (Argentina) L Midón
Alt	(Brazil) Breno Braga (Brazil) Victor Braga	5	1
3	(Brazil) L Britto (Brazil) M Zormann	7	6
(Brazil) PA Saraiva dos Santos (Argentina) G Villanueva	w/o
(Argentina) A Collarini (Argentina) JP Ficovich
(Spain) Àlex Martí Pujolràs (Spain) N Sánchez Izquierdo
2	(Brazil) M Demoliner (Brazil) F Romboli	w/o

Quarterfinals
1	(Argentina) G Andreozzi (Brazil) O Luz	w/o
(Bolivia) M Dellien (Bolivia) JC Prado Ángelo
(France) G Debru (Italy) A Pellegrino	2	1
PR	(Argentina) L Aboian (Peru) A Huertas del Pino	6	6
Alt	(Brazil) VH Remondy Pagotto (Brazil) G Tumasonis	0	6^{5}
3	(Brazil) L Britto (Brazil) M Zormann	6	7^{7}
(Brazil) PA Saraiva dos Santos (Argentina) G Villanueva
2	(Brazil) M Demoliner (Brazil) F Romboli	w/o

Semifinals
1	(Argentina) G Andreozzi (Brazil) O Luz	6	6
PR	(Argentina) L Aboian (Peru) A Huertas del Pino	3	4
3	(Brazil) L Britto (Brazil) M Zormann	6	3	[6]
2	(Brazil) M Demoliner (Brazil) F Romboli	3	6	[10]

Final
1	(Argentina) G Andreozzi (Brazil) O Luz	6^{4}	6	[11]
2	(Brazil) M Demoliner (Brazil) F Romboli	7^{7}	2	[9]
