= 2026 Piracicaba Challenger – Doubles =

Doubles
- 2026 Piracicaba Challenger

Final
- Champions: (Brazil) Luís Felipe Miguel (Brazil) Paulo André Saraiva dos Santos
- Runners-up: (Peru) Arklon Huertas del Pino (Peru) Conner Huertas del Pino
- Score: 6–3, 7–6^{(7–0)}

Events
Singles	Doubles
- Piracicaba Challenger

Guido Andreozzi and Orlando Luz were the defending champions but chose not to defend their title.

Luís Felipe Miguel and Paulo André Saraiva dos Santos won the title after defeating Arklon and Conner Huertas del Pino 6–3, 7–6^{(7–0)} in the final.

== Seeds ==
1. (Chile) Matías Soto / (Bolivia) Federico Zeballos (first round)
2. (Argentina) Valentín Basel / (Uruguay) Ignacio Carou (first round)
3. (Brazil) Luís Britto / (Argentina) Gonzalo Villanueva (quarterfinals)
4. (Argentina) Hernán Casanova / (Argentina) Santiago Rodríguez Taverna (withdrew)

== Draw ==
Key

- Q = Qualifier
- WC = Wild card
- LL = Lucky loser
- Alt = Alternate
- ITF = ITF entry
- PR = Protected ranking
- SR = Special ranking
- SE = Special exempt
- JE = Junior exempt
- JR = Junior Accelerator Programme entrant
- CO = College Accelerator Programme entrant
- NG = Next Gen Accelerator Program entrant
- w/o = Walkover
- r = Retired
- d = Defaulted

First round
1	(Chile) M Soto (Bolivia) F Zeballos	7^{7}	4	[5]
WC	(Brazil) Gustavo Ribeiro de Almeida (Brazil) Enzo Kohlmann de Freitas	6^{5}	6	[10]
(Brazil) LF Miguel (Brazil) PA Saraiva dos Santos	7^{7}	6^{1}	[13]
(Argentina) Thiago Cigarrán (Argentina) N Kicker	6^{4}	7^{7}	[11]
Alt	(Brazil) Luka Bojicic Ono (Brazil) Henrique Ortenblad Nogueira	4	2
Alt	(Brazil) Rafael Tosetto (Brazil) Nicolas Zanellato	6	6
(Colombia) C Rodríguez (Colombia) A Urrea	6	6
Alt	(Brazil) Victor Bini (Brazil) André Souza	3	2
(Brazil) JVC Loureiro (Brazil) Natan Rodrigues	7^{7}	6
Alt	(Brazil) Breno Braga (Brazil) Victor Braga	6^{0}	3
WC	(Brazil) Andrey Barbiero (Brazil) Filipe Bullamah	1	4
3	(Brazil) L Britto (Argentina) G Villanueva	6	6
(Argentina) JM La Serna (Argentina) Máximo Zeitune
(Peru) A Huertas del Pino (Peru) C Huertas del Pino	w/o
(Brazil) Bruno Oliveira (Brazil) M Pucinelli de Almeida	6	6
2	(Argentina) Valentín Basel (Uruguay) I Carou	2	0

Quarterfinals
WC	(Brazil) GR de Almeida (Brazil) E Kohlmann de Freitas	4	2
(Brazil) LF Miguel (Brazil) PA Saraiva dos Santos	6	6
Alt	(Brazil) R Tosetto (Brazil) N Zanellato	3	2
(Colombia) C Rodríguez (Colombia) A Urrea	6	6
(Brazil) JVC Loureiro (Brazil) N Rodrigues	7^{7}	2	[10]
3	(Brazil) L Britto (Argentina) G Villanueva	6^{4}	6	[3]
(Peru) A Huertas del Pino (Peru) C Huertas del Pino	4	6	[10]
(Brazil) B Oliveira (Brazil) M Pucinelli de Almeida	6	2	[6]

Semifinals
(Brazil) LF Miguel (Brazil) PA Saraiva dos Santos	7	6
(Colombia) C Rodríguez (Colombia) A Urrea	5	2
(Brazil) JVC Loureiro (Brazil) N Rodrigues	6^{4}	2
(Peru) A Huertas del Pino (Peru) C Huertas del Pino	7^{7}	6

Final
(Brazil) LF Miguel (Brazil) PA Saraiva dos Santos	6	7^{7}
(Peru) A Huertas del Pino (Peru) C Huertas del Pino	3	6^{0}
