= 2025 Brasil Tennis Challenger =

- Date: 27 January – 2 February
- Edition: 3rd
- Surface: Clay
- Location: Piracicaba, Brazil

Champions

Singles
- (Argentina) Román Andrés Burruchaga

Doubles
- (Argentina) Guido Andreozzi / (Brazil) Orlando Luz
- Brasil Tennis Challenger

The 2025 Brasil Tennis Challenger was a professional tennis tournament played on clay courts. It was the third edition of the tournament which was part of the 2025 ATP Challenger Tour. It took place in Piracicaba, Brazil between 27 January and 2 February 2025. The tail end (final phases) of the competition was moved to São Paulo at the clay-covered courts of the Arena Ace due to heavy rains.

== Singles main-draw entrants ==
=== Seeds ===
Country	Player	Rank^{1}	Seed
ARG	Camilo Ugo Carabelli	94	1
ARG	Federico Coria	96	2
BOL	Hugo Dellien	123	3
COL	Daniel Elahi Galán	128	4
BRA	Felipe Meligeni Alves	148	5
ARG	Román Andrés Burruchaga	151	6
BRA	Gustavo Heide	175	7
BOL	Murkel Dellien	184	8

- ^{1} Rankings are as of 13 January 2025.

=== Other entrants ===
The following players received wildcards into the singles main draw:

- (Brazil) João Lucas Reis da Silva
- (Brazil) ~~Eduardo Ribeiro~~
- (Brazil) Pedro Sakamoto

The following player received entry into the singles main draw as an alternate:

- (Argentina) Renzo Olivo

The following players received entry from the qualifying draw:

- (Argentina) Valerio Aboian
- (France) Maxime Chazal
- (Spain) Àlex Martí Pujolràs
- (Argentina) Lautaro Midón
- (Spain) Nikolás Sánchez Izquierdo
- (Austria) Joel Schwärzler

The following player received entry as a lucky loser:

- (Italy) Marco Cecchinato

== Champions ==
=== Singles ===
- (Argentina) Román Andrés Burruchaga def. (Argentina) Facundo Mena 7–6^{(10–8)}, 6–7^{(6–8)}, 7–6^{(7–4)}.

=== Doubles ===
- (Argentina) Guido Andreozzi / (Brazil) Orlando Luz def. (Brazil) Marcelo Demoliner / (Brazil) Fernando Romboli 6–7^{(4–7)}, 6–2, [11–9].
