= 2023 Brasil Tennis Challenger =

- Date: 16–22 January
- Edition: 1st
- Surface: Clay
- Location: Piracicaba, Brazil

Champions

Singles
- (Argentina) Andrea Collarini

Doubles
- (Brazil) Orlando Luz / (Brazil) Marcelo Zormann
Brasil Tennis Challenger	· 2024 →

The 2023 Brasil Tennis Challenger was a professional tennis tournament played on clay courts. It was the first edition of the tournament which was part of the 2023 ATP Challenger Tour. It took place in Piracicaba, Brazil between 16 and 22 January 2023.

== Singles main-draw entrants ==
=== Seeds ===
Country	Player	Rank^{1}	Seed
CHI	Alejandro Tabilo	103	1
ARG	Camilo Ugo Carabelli	127	2
~~ARG~~	~~Juan Manuel Cerúndolo~~	~~143~~	~~3~~
BRA	Felipe Meligeni Alves	165	4
ARG	Renzo Olivo	183	5
~~ARG~~	~~Facundo Díaz Acosta~~	~~198~~	~~6~~
BRA	Matheus Pucinelli de Almeida	210	7
ARG	Genaro Alberto Olivieri	227	8
CHI	Tomás Barrios Vera	230	9

- ^{1} Rankings are as of 9 January 2023.

=== Other entrants ===
The following players received wildcards into the singles main draw:

- (Brazil) Pedro Boscardin Dias
- (Brazil) João Lucas Reis da Silva
- (Brazil) Eduardo Ribeiro

The following players received entry into the singles main draw as alternates:

- (France) Térence Atmane
- (Brazil) Daniel Dutra da Silva

The following players received entry from the qualifying draw:

- Andrey Chepelev
- (South Korea) Chung Yun-seong
- (Bolivia) Murkel Dellien
- (Italy) Edoardo Lavagno
- (Ukraine) Oleg Prihodko
- (Brazil) Thiago Seyboth Wild

The following players received entry as lucky losers:

- (Tunisia) Moez Echargui
- (Spain) Carlos Sánchez Jover

== Champions ==
=== Singles ===
- (Argentina) Andrea Collarini def. (Chile) Tomás Barrios Vera 6–2, 7–6^{(7–1)}.

=== Doubles ===
- (Brazil) Orlando Luz / (Brazil) Marcelo Zormann def. (Argentina) Andrea Collarini / (Argentina) Renzo Olivo Walkover.
