= 2025 Challenger de Buenos Aires – Singles =

Singles
- 2025 Challenger de Buenos Aires

Final
- Champion: (Argentina) Román Andrés Burruchaga
- Runner-up: (Argentina) Alex Barrena
- Score: 7–6^{(7–4)}, 6–3

Events
| Singles | Doubles |
- Challenger de Buenos Aires

Francisco Comesaña was the defending champion but chose not to defend his title.

Román Andrés Burruchaga won the title after defeating Alex Barrena 7–6^{(7–4)}, 6–3 in the final.

== Seeds ==
1. (Argentina) Thiago Agustín Tirante (first round)
2. (United States) Emilio Nava (first round)
3. (Bolivia) Hugo Dellien (second round, retired)
4. (Chile) Cristian Garín (first round)
5. (Argentina) Juan Pablo Ficovich (first round)
6. (Argentina) Román Andrés Burruchaga (champion)
7. (Italy) Francesco Maestrelli (second round)
8. (Lebanon) Hady Habib (first round)

== Draw ==
Key

- Q = Qualifier
- WC = Wild card
- LL = Lucky loser
- Alt = Alternate
- ITF = ITF entry
- PR = Protected ranking
- SR = Special ranking
- SE = Special exempt
- JE = Junior exempt
- JR = Junior Accelerator Programme entrant
- CO = College Accelerator Programme entrant
- NG = Next Gen Accelerator Program entrant
- w/o = Walkover
- r = Retired
- d = Defaulted

=== Finals ===
Semifinals
6 | (Argentina) Román Andrés Burruchaga | 6 | 6
Alt | (Argentina) Nicolás Kicker | 2 | 4
(Argentina) Alex Barrena | 6 | 6
(Ecuador) Álvaro Guillén Meza | 1 | 1

Final
6 | (Argentina) Román Andrés Burruchaga | 7^{7} | 6
(Argentina) Alex Barrena | 6^{4} | 3

=== Top half ===
First round
1 | (Argentina) TA Tirante | 3 | 4
(Paraguay) AD Vallejo | 6 | 6
(Argentina) GA Olivieri | 6 | 3 | 6
(Argentina) S Rodríguez Taverna | 2 | 6 | 3
(Argentina) A Collarini | 7^{7} | 2 | 6
Q | (Argentina) LE Ambrogi | 6^{5} | 6 | 3
Q | (Argentina) H Casanova | 3 | 4
6 | (Argentina) RA Burruchaga | 6 | 6
4 | (Chile) C Garín | 3 | 4
Alt | (Argentina) N Kicker | 6 | 6
Q | (Argentina) G Villanueva | 0 | 6 | 3
WC | (Argentina) F Bagnis | 6 | 3 | 6
(Argentina) FA Gómez | 6 | 3 | 6^{3}
(Peru) G Bueno | 3 | 6 | 7^{7}
Q | (Brazil) D Dutra da Silva | 3 | 6 | 3
7 | (Italy) F Maestrelli | 6 | 4 | 6

Second round
(Paraguay) AD Vallejo | 3 | 2
(Argentina) GA Olivieri | 6 | 6
(Argentina) A Collarini | 2 | 4
6 | (Argentina) RA Burruchaga | 6 | 6
Alt | (Argentina) N Kicker | 6 | 6
WC | (Argentina) F Bagnis | 3 | 4
(Peru) G Bueno | 6 | 7^{7}
7 | (Italy) F Maestrelli | 3 | 6^{3}

Quarterfinals
(Argentina) GA Olivieri | 1 | 6^{6}
6 | (Argentina) RA Burruchaga | 6 | 7^{8}
Alt | (Argentina) N Kicker | 6 | 6
(Peru) G Bueno | 2 | 2

Semifinals
6 | (Argentina) RA Burruchaga | 6 | 6
Alt | (Argentina) N Kicker | 2 | 4

=== Bottom half ===
First round
5 | (Argentina) JP Ficovich | 3 | 6^{1}
WC | (Argentina) GI Justo | 6 | 7^{7}
Q | (Argentina) Lorenzo Joaquín Rodríguez | 6 | 6
(Bolivia) M Dellien | 4 | 1
(Argentina) A Barrena | 6 | 5 | 6
WC | (Argentina) JB Torres | 1 | 7 | 4
Q | (Peru) JP Varillas | 2 | 6^{3}
3 | (Bolivia) H Dellien | 6 | 7^{7}
8 | (Lebanon) H Habib | 7^{7} | 6^{8} | 4
(Ecuador) Á Guillén Meza | 6^{4} | 7^{10} | 6
(Argentina) L Midón | 5 | 6 | 1
(Bolivia) JC Prado Ángelo | 7 | 4 | 6
Alt | (Brazil) M Pucinelli de Almeida | 6 | 6
(Chile) M Soto | 1 | 1
(Brazil) JL Reis da Silva | 4 | 7 | 7
2 | (United States) E Nava | 6 | 5 | 5

Second round
WC | (Argentina) GI Justo | 7^{7} | 6
Q | (Argentina) LJ Rodríguez | 6^{3} | 3
(Argentina) A Barrena | 6 | 1
3 | (Bolivia) H Dellien | 1 | 0^{r}
(Ecuador) Á Guillén Meza | 6 | 6
(Bolivia) JC Prado Ángelo | 1 | 2
Alt | (Brazil) M Pucinelli de Almeida | 6 | 3 | 6
(Brazil) JL Reis da Silva | 0 | 6 | 4

Quarterfinals
WC | (Argentina) GI Justo | 2 | 7^{7} | 3
(Argentina) A Barrena | 6 | 6^{1} | 6
(Ecuador) Á Guillén Meza | 1 | 6 | 6
Alt | (Brazil) M Pucinelli de Almeida | 6 | 4 | 4

Semifinals
(Argentina) A Barrena | 6 | 6
(Ecuador) Á Guillén Meza | 1 | 1
