= 2015 Challenger ATP Cachantún Cup – Doubles =

Doubles
- 2015 Challenger ATP Cachantún Cup

Final
- Champions: (Argentina) Andrés Molteni (Argentina) Guido Pella
- Runners-up: (Argentina) Andrea Collarini (Argentina) Máximo González
- Score: 7–6^{(9–7)}, 3–6, [10–4]

Events
| Singles | Doubles |
- Challenger ATP Cachantún Cup

Christian Garin and Nicolás Jarry were the defending champions, but did not play together. Garin partnered with Julio Peralta and lost in the first round. Jarry partnered with Marcelo Demoliner and lost in the second round.

== Seeds ==
1. (Argentina) Andrés Molteni / (Argentina) Guido Pella (champions)
2. (Brazil) Marcelo Demoliner / (Chile) Nicolás Jarry (second round)
3. (Argentina) Facundo Bagnis / (Peru) Sergio Galdós (first round)
4. (Uruguay) Ariel Behar / (Argentina) Horacio Zeballos (first round)

== Draw ==
Key

- Q = Qualifier
- WC = Wild card
- LL = Lucky loser
- Alt = Alternate
- ITF = ITF entry
- PR = Protected ranking
- SR = Special ranking
- SE = Special exempt
- JE = Junior exempt
- JR = Junior Accelerator Programme entrant
- CO = College Accelerator Programme entrant
- NG = Next Gen Accelerator Program entrant
- w/o = Walkover
- r = Retired
- d = Defaulted

First round
1 | (Argentina) A Molteni (Argentina) G Pella | 6 | 7
(Chile) C Garin (Chile) J Peralta | 4 | 5
WC | (Argentina) Patricio Heras (Dominican Republic) J Hernández | 6 | 7^{7}
(Colombia) A González (Brazil) F Romboli | 3 | 6^{4}
4 | (Uruguay) A Behar (Argentina) H Zeballos | 4 | 7^{7} | [9]
(Brazil) F Neis (Chile) H Podlipnik-Castillo | 6 | 6^{2} | [11]
(Argentina) G Durán (Argentina) R Olivo | 6 | 7
(Brazil) R Dutra Silva (Argentina) JI Londero | 4 | 5
WC | (Chile) J Aguilar (Chile) JC Sáez | 6 | 6
(Brazil) G Clezar (Brazil) F de Paula | 0 | 3
(Ecuador) G Lapentti (Spain) R Ramírez Hidalgo | 5 | 6 | [11]
3 | (Argentina) F Bagnis (Peru) S Galdós | 7 | 4 | [9]
(Argentina) A Collarini (Argentina) M González | 6 | 3 | [10]
WC | (Chile) G Rivera-Aránguiz (Chile) Ricardo Urzúa-Rivera | 4 | 6 | [2]
(Argentina) F Argüello (Argentina) P Cachin | 6^{4} | 6^{2}
2 | (Brazil) M Demoliner (Chile) N Jarry | 7^{7} | 7^{7}

Quarterfinals
1 | (Argentina) A Molteni (Argentina) G Pella | 7^{7} | 6
WC | (Argentina) P Heras (Dominican Republic) J Hernández | 6^{1} | 1
(Brazil) F Neis (Chile) H Podlipnik-Castillo | 3 | 7 | [10]
(Argentina) G Durán (Argentina) R Olivo | 6 | 5 | [2]
WC | (Chile) J Aguilar (Chile) JC Sáez | 7^{7} | 3 | [11]
(Ecuador) G Lapentti (Spain) R Ramírez Hidalgo | 6^{4} | 6 | [9]
(Argentina) A Collarini (Argentina) M González | 6 | 6
2 | (Brazil) M Demoliner (Chile) N Jarry | 2 | 4

Semifinals
1 | (Argentina) A Molteni (Argentina) G Pella | 6 | 6
(Brazil) F Neis (Chile) H Podlipnik-Castillo | 3 | 2
WC | (Chile) J Aguilar (Chile) JC Sáez | 2 | 2
(Argentina) A Collarini (Argentina) M González | 6 | 6

Final
1 | (Argentina) A Molteni (Argentina) G Pella | 7^{9} | 3 | [10]
(Argentina) A Collarini (Argentina) M González | 6^{7} | 6 | [4]

== Bibliography ==
- Main Draw
