= 2023 Brasil Tennis Challenger – Doubles =

Doubles
- 2023 Brasil Tennis Challenger

Final
- Champions: (Brazil) Orlando Luz (Brazil) Marcelo Zormann
- Runners-up: (Argentina) Andrea Collarini (Argentina) Renzo Olivo
- Score: Walkover

Events
Singles	Doubles
- Brasil Tennis Challenger

This was the first edition of the tournament.

Orlando Luz and Marcelo Zormann won the title by walkover after Andrea Collarini and Renzo Olivo withdrew from the final.

== Seeds ==
1. (Bolivia) Boris Arias / (Bolivia) Federico Zeballos (quarterfinals)
2. (Poland) Karol Drzewiecki / (Poland) Piotr Matuszewski (first round)
3. (Netherlands) Jesper de Jong / (Colombia) Nicolás Mejía (withdrew)
4. (Argentina) Andrea Collarini / (Argentina) Renzo Olivo (final, withdrew)

== Draw ==
Key

- Q = Qualifier
- WC = Wild card
- LL = Lucky loser
- Alt = Alternate
- ITF = ITF entry
- PR = Protected ranking
- SR = Special ranking
- SE = Special exempt
- JE = Junior exempt
- JR = Junior Accelerator Programme entrant
- CO = College Accelerator Programme entrant
- NG = Next Gen Accelerator Program entrant
- w/o = Walkover
- r = Retired
- d = Defaulted

First round
1	(Bolivia) B Arias (Bolivia) F Zeballos	6	6
(Argentina) H Casanova (Argentina) JB Torres	4	0
(Brazil) O Luz (Brazil) M Zormann	6	7
(Bolivia) M Dellien (Peru) J Panta	3	5
Alt	Andrey Chepelev (Argentina) JP Paz	2	5
(Brazil) D Dutra da Silva (Ukraine) O Prihodko	6	7
(Peru) A Merino (Switzerland) J Paul	4	6	[10]
(Uruguay) I Carou (Argentina) C Ugo Carabelli	6	2	[8]
(Argentina) Ignacio Monzón (Argentina) M Navone	6^{2}	6	[8]
Alt	(Brazil) Enrique Bogo (Brazil) PA Saraiva dos Santos	7^{7}	4	[10]
WC	(Brazil) P Boscardin Dias (Brazil) Wilson Leite	5	2
4	(Argentina) A Collarini (Argentina) R Olivo	7	6
(Brazil) M Pucinelli de Almeida (Brazil) JL Reis da Silva
(Spain) O Roca Batalla (Germany) Timo Stodder	w/o
(Peru) A Huertas del Pino (Peru) C Huertas del Pino	2	6	[10]
2	(Poland) K Drzewiecki (Poland) P Matuszewski	6	3	[8]

Quarterfinals
1	(Bolivia) B Arias (Bolivia) F Zeballos	3	6^{8}
(Brazil) O Luz (Brazil) M Zormann	6	7^{10}
(Brazil) D Dutra da Silva (Ukraine) O Prihodko	6	2	[12]
(Peru) A Merino (Switzerland) J Paul	3	6	[10]
Alt	(Brazil) E Bogo (Brazil) PA Saraiva dos Santos	4	4
4	(Argentina) A Collarini (Argentina) R Olivo	6	6
(Spain) O Roca Batalla (Germany) T Stodder	4	4
(Peru) A Huertas del Pino (Peru) C Huertas del Pino	6	6

Semifinals
(Brazil) O Luz (Brazil) M Zormann	w/o
(Brazil) D Dutra da Silva (Ukraine) O Prihodko
4	(Argentina) A Collarini (Argentina) R Olivo	6	6
(Peru) A Huertas del Pino (Peru) C Huertas del Pino	4	4

Final
(Brazil) O Luz (Brazil) M Zormann	w/o
4	(Argentina) A Collarini (Argentina) R Olivo
