= 2026 Piracicaba Challenger =

- Date: 22 – 28 June
- Edition: 4th
- Surface: Clay
- Location: Piracicaba, Brazil

Champions

Singles
- (Brazil) Thiago Seyboth Wild

Doubles
- (Brazil) Luís Felipe Miguel / (Brazil) Paulo André Saraiva dos Santos
- Piracicaba Challenger

The 2026 Piracicaba Challenger was a professional tennis tournament played on clay courts. It was the fourth edition of the tournament which was part of the 2026 ATP Challenger Tour. It took place in Piracicaba, Brazil between 22 and 28 June 2026.

== Singles main-draw entrants ==
=== Seeds ===
Country	Player	Rank^{1}	Seed
ARG	Juan Bautista Torres	280	1
ARG	Juan Manuel La Serna	286	2
BRA	Thiago Seyboth Wild	297	3
CHI	Matías Soto	317	4
ARG	Luciano Emanuel Ambrogi	324	5
DOM	Nick Hardt	340	6
ARG	Nicolás Kicker	343	7
BRA	Eduardo Ribeiro	381	8

- ^{1} Rankings are as of 15 June 2026.

=== Other entrants ===
The following players received wildcards into the singles main draw:

- (Brazil) Filipe Bullamah
- (Brazil) Enzo Kohlmann de Freitas
- (Brazil) Luís Felipe Miguel

The following player received entry into the singles main draw as an alternate:

- (Peru) Conner Huertas del Pino

The following players received entry from the qualifying draw:

- (Brazil) Lucas Andrade da Silva
- (Argentina) Valentín Basel
- (Brazil) Gustavo Ribeiro de Almeida
- (Brazil) Wilson Leite
- (Brazil) Nicolas Oliveira
- (Brazil) Nicolas Zanellato

The following player received entry as a lucky loser:

- (Argentina) Thiago Cigarrán

== Champions ==
=== Singles ===
- (Brazil) Thiago Seyboth Wild def. (Argentina) Gonzalo Villanueva 6–2, 6–2.

=== Doubles ===
- (Brazil) Luís Felipe Miguel / (Brazil) Paulo André Saraiva dos Santos def. (Peru) Arklon Huertas del Pino / (Peru) Conner Huertas del Pino 6–3, 7–6^{(7–0)}.
