= 2023 Internazionali di Tennis Città di Todi – Doubles =

Doubles
- 2023 Internazionali di Tennis Città di Todi

Final
- Champions: (Brazil) Fernando Romboli (Brazil) Marcelo Zormann
- Runners-up: (Argentina) Román Andrés Burruchaga (Brazil) Orlando Luz
- Score: 6–7^{(13–15)}, 6–4, [10–5]

Events
Singles	Doubles
← 2022 ·	Internazionali di Tennis Città di Todi	· 2024 →

Guido Andreozzi and Guillermo Durán were the defending champions but chose not to defend their title.

Fernando Romboli and Marcelo Zormann won the title after defeating Román Andrés Burruchaga and Orlando Luz 6–7^{(13–15)}, 6–4, [10–5] in the final.

== Seeds ==
1. (Bolivia) Boris Arias / (Bolivia) Federico Zeballos (semifinals)
2. (Italy) Andrea Pellegrino / (Croatia) Nino Serdarušić (withdrew)
3. (Brazil) Fernando Romboli / (Brazil) Marcelo Zormann (champions)
4. (Spain) Íñigo Cervantes / (Spain) Oriol Roca Batalla (first round)

== Draw ==
=== Key ===
- Q = Qualifier
- WC = Wild card
- LL = Lucky loser
- Alt = Alternate
- SE = Special exempt
- PR = Protected ranking
- ITF = ITF entry
- JE = Junior exempt
- w/o = Walkover
- r = Retired
- d = Defaulted
- SR = Special ranking

First round
(India) P Raja (India) R Ramanathan	3	7^{7}	[6]
(Spain) J Barranco Cosano (Spain) C Sánchez Jover	6	6^{2}	[10]
3	(Brazil) F Romboli (Brazil) M Zormann	6	6
WC	(Spain) D Marrero (United States) Dhruva Mulye	3	4
WC	(Italy) Alessio De Bernardis (Slovenia) Sebastian Dominko	7	6^{5}	[14]
(Israel) R Stepanov (United States) Tennyson Whiting	5	7^{7}	[12]
PR	(Switzerland) L Margaroli (Netherlands) M Vervoort	6^{2}	2
(Argentina) RA Burruchaga (Brazil) O Luz	7^{7}	6
(Argentina) FA Gómez (United Kingdom) M Willis	7^{7}	6
4	(Spain) Í Cervantes (Spain) O Roca Batalla	6^{4}	3
(Italy) F Maestrelli (Italy) Samuel Vincent Ruggeri	6	6
(France) G Debru (France) C Tabur	4	3

Quarterfinals
1	(Bolivia) B Arias (Bolivia) F Zeballos	6	7^{7}
(Spain) J Barranco Cosano (Spain) C Sánchez Jover	4	6^{5}
3	(Brazil) F Romboli (Brazil) M Zormann	6	7
WC	(Italy) A De Bernardis (Slovenia) S Dominko	1	5
(Argentina) RA Burruchaga (Brazil) O Luz	6	7^{10}
(Argentina) FA Gómez (United Kingdom) M Willis	3	6^{8}
(Italy) F Maestrelli (Italy) S Vincent Ruggeri	w/o
(Italy) Facundo Juárez (Argentina) Juan Bautista Otegui

Semifinals
1	(Bolivia) B Arias (Bolivia) F Zeballos	3	4
3	(Brazil) F Romboli (Brazil) M Zormann	6	6
(Argentina) RA Burruchaga (Brazil) O Luz	6	6
(Italy) F Maestrelli (Italy) S Vincent Ruggeri	3	4

Final
3	(Brazil) F Romboli (Brazil) M Zormann	6^{13}	6	[10]
(Argentina) RA Burruchaga (Brazil) O Luz	7^{15}	4	[5]
