= 2024 Brasil Tennis Challenger =

- Date: 29 January – 4 February
- Edition: 2nd
- Surface: Clay
- Location: Piracicaba, Brazil

Champions

Singles
- (Argentina) Camilo Ugo Carabelli

Doubles
- (Argentina) Guido Andreozzi / (Argentina) Guillermo Durán
- Brasil Tennis Challenger

The 2024 Brasil Tennis Challenger was a professional tennis tournament played on clay courts. It was the second edition of the tournament which was part of the 2024 ATP Challenger Tour. It took place in Piracicaba, Brazil between 29 January and 4 February 2024.

== Singles main-draw entrants ==
=== Seeds ===
Country	Player	Rank^{1}	Seed
ARG	Federico Coria	84	1
ARG	Camilo Ugo Carabelli	139	2
	Ivan Gakhov	177	3
ARG	Santiago Rodríguez Taverna	206	4
ITA	Marco Cecchinato	216	5
ITA	Alessandro Giannessi	226	6
ITA	Edoardo Lavagno	238	7
ARG	Juan Pablo Ficovich	251	8

- ^{1} Rankings are as of 15 January 2024.

=== Other entrants ===
The following players received wildcards into the singles main draw:

- (Brazil) Mateus Alves
- (Brazil) Eduardo Ribeiro
- (Brazil) Nicolas Zanellato

The following player received entry into the singles main draw as an alternate:

- (South Korea) Gerard Campaña Lee

The following players received entry from the qualifying draw:

- (Argentina) Alex Barrena
- (Brazil) Daniel Dutra da Silva
- (Switzerland) Kilian Feldbausch
- (Argentina) Federico Agustín Gómez
- (Argentina) Gonzalo Villanueva
- (Switzerland) Damien Wenger

== Champions ==
=== Singles ===
- (Argentina) Camilo Ugo Carabelli def. (Argentina) Federico Coria 7–5, 6–4.

=== Doubles ===
- (Argentina) Guido Andreozzi / (Argentina) Guillermo Durán def. (Brazil) Daniel Dutra da Silva / (Brazil) Pedro Sakamoto 6–2, 7–6^{(7–5)}.
