= Román Andrés Burruchaga =

Argentine tennis player

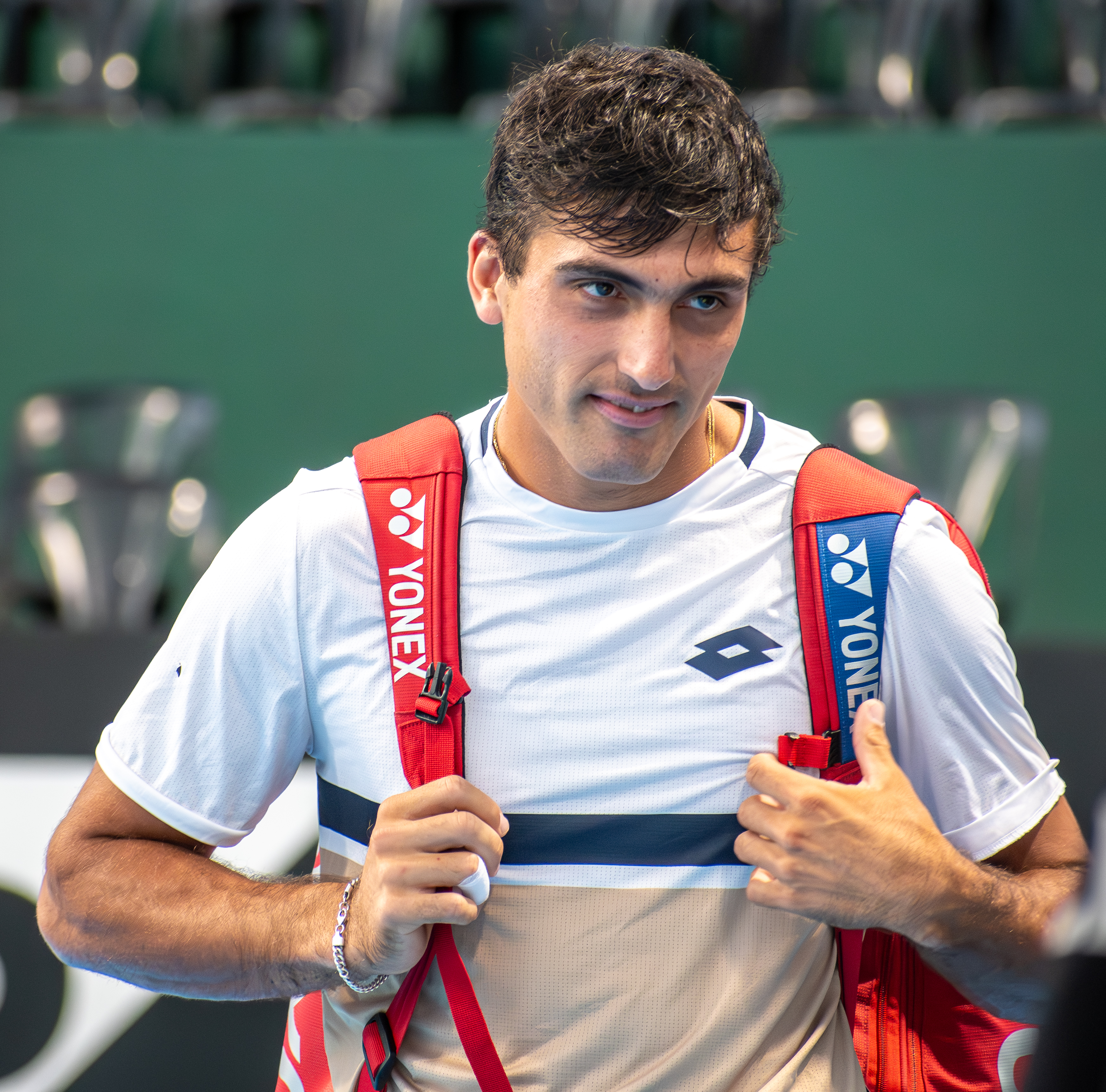
- Burruchaga in 2025
- Country (sports): Argentina
- Born: 23 January 2002 (age 24) Buenos Aires, Argentina
- Height: 1.83 m (6 ft 0 in)
- Plays: Right-handed (two-handed backhand)
- Coach: Leonardo Mayer (2023-); Miguel Pastura (-2024)
- Prize money: US $1,026,773

Singles
- Career record: 10–13
- Career titles: 0
- Highest ranking: No. 56 (4 May 2026)
- Current ranking: No. 79 (9 November 2026)

Grand Slam singles results
- Australian Open: Q2 (2026)
- French Open: 2R (2026)
- Wimbledon: 1R (2026)
- US Open: 1R (2026)

Doubles
- Career record: 1–5
- Career titles: 0
- Highest ranking: No. 191 (3 October 2022)
- Current ranking: No. 645 (4 May 2026)

Grand Slam doubles results
- French Open: 2R (2026)
- Wimbledon: 2R (2026)
- Last updated on: 4 May 2026.

Román Andrés Burruchaga (born 23 January 2002) is an Argentine professional tennis player. He has a career-high ATP singles ranking of world No. 56 achieved on 4 May 2026 and a doubles ranking of No. 191 achieved on 3 October 2022. He is currently the No. 4 Argentine singles player.

== Personal life ==
Burruchaga is the son of Argentine former footballer and 1986 FIFA World Cup winner Jorge Burruchaga.

== Career ==
=== 2022-23: First doubles Challenger title and singles final ===
Burruchaga won his first ATP Challenger doubles title at the 2022 Copa Sevilla with Facundo Díaz Acosta.

=== 2024: ATP, Major and top 125 debuts ===
Burruchaga made his ATP main draw debut at the 2024 Córdoba Open as a qualifier and recorded his first ATP win over Diego Schwartzman. He made his top 150 debut on 8 April 2024 at world No. 149.

In May, Burruchaga qualified for the 2024 French Open making his Grand Slam debut. Following a final showing in July at the 2024 Zug Open, he reached the top 130 in the rankings on 29 July 2024 and the top 125 a week later.

=== 2025–2026: Won second-longest Challenger final, Masters & top 100 debuts, ATP final ===
Burruchaga won his first singles title at the 2025 Brasil Challenger, defeating Facundo Mena in the second-longest Challenger final in history.

Ranked No. 135, Burruchaga made his Masters 1000 debut in Rome at the 2025 Italian Open after qualifying for the main draw with a win over former top 10 player Pablo Carreño Busta, and defeated Lorenzo Sonego recording his first Masters win.

Burruchaga won his biggest title to date at the newly established 2025 Costa do Sauípe Open 125 Challenger, and reached the top 110 at world No. 106 in the singles rankings on 27 October 2025.

Ranked No. 77, Burruchaga reached his first ATP final at the Fayez Sarofim & Co. US Men's Clay Court Championship defeating Thiago Agustín Tirante.

== Performance timeline ==
Key
W	F	SF	QF	#R	RR	Q#	DNQ	A	NH

(W) winner; (F) finalist; (SF) semifinalist; (QF) quarterfinalist; (#R) rounds 4, 3, 2, 1; (RR) round-robin stage; (Q#) qualification round; (DNQ) did not qualify; (A) absent; (NH) not held; (SR) strike rate (events won / competed); (W–L) win–loss record.
To avoid confusion and double counting, these charts are updated at the conclusion of a tournament or when the player's participation has ended.

=== Singles ===
Current through the 2026 French Open.

Tournament	2024	2025	2026	SR	W–L	Win %
Grand Slam tournaments
Australian Open	Q1	Q1	Q2	0 / 0	0–0	–
French Open	1R	Q2	2R	0 / 2	1–2	33%
Wimbledon	Q3	Q2		0 / 0	0–0	–
US Open	Q2	Q2		0 / 0	0–0	–
Win–loss	0–1	0–0	1–1	0 / 2	1–2	33%
ATP Masters 1000
Indian Wells Masters	A	A	Q2	0 / 0	0–0	–
Miami Open	A	A	Q1	0 / 0	0–0	–
Monte Carlo Masters	A	A	A	0 / 0	0–0	–
Madrid Open	A	Q1	A	0 / 0	0-0	–
Italian Open	A	2R	1R	0 / 2	1–2	33%
Canadian Open	A	A		0 / 0	0–0	–
Cincinnati Masters	A	A		0 / 0	0–0	–
Shanghai Masters	A	A		0 / 0	0–0	–
Paris Masters	A	A		0 / 0	0–0	–
Win–loss	0–0	1–1	0–1	0 / 2	1–2	33%

== ATP Tour finals ==
=== Singles: 1 (runner-up) ===
Legend Grand Slam (–) ATP 1000 (–) ATP 500 (–) ATP 250 (0–1)	Finals by surface Hard (–) Clay (0–1) Grass (–)	Finals by setting Outdoor (0–1) Indoor (–)

Result	W–L	Date	Tournament	Tier	Surface	Opponent	Score
Loss	0–1	Apr 2026	U.S. Men's Clay Court Championships, US	ATP 250	Clay	(United States) Tommy Paul	1–6, 6–3, 5–7

== ATP Challenger Tour finals ==
=== Singles: 7 (4 titles, 3 runner-ups) ===
Legend ATP Challenger Tour (4–3)	Finals by surface Hard (0–1) Clay (4–2)

Result	W–L	Date	Tournament	Tier	Surface	Opponent	Score
Loss	0–1	Nov 2023	Aberto da República, Brazil	Challenger	Hard	(Chile) Alejandro Tabilo	3–6, 6–7^{(6–8)}
Loss	0–2	Jul 2024	Zug Open, Switzerland	Challenger	Clay	(Switzerland) Jérôme Kym	4–6, 4–6
Win	1–2	Feb 2025	Brasil Tennis Challenger, Brazil	Challenger	Clay	(Argentina) Facundo Mena	7–6^{(10–8)}, 6–7^{(6–8)}, 7–6^{(7–4)}
Win	2–2	Sep 2025	Buenos Aires Challenger, Argentina	Challenger	Clay	(Argentina) Alex Barrena	7–6^{(7–4)}, 6–3
Win	3–2	Oct 2025	Costa do Sauípe Open, Brazil	Challenger	Clay	(Paraguay) Daniel Vallejo	6–1, 6–2
Loss	3–3	Feb 2026	Rosario Challenger, Argentina	Challenger	Clay	(Argentina) Camilo Ugo Carabelli	2–6, 3–6
Win	4–3	Mar 2026	LA Open, Brazil	Challenger	Clay	(Portugal) Jaime Faria	6–7^{(5–7)}, 6–4, 6–4

=== Doubles: 3 (1 title, 2 runner-ups) ===
Legend ATP Challenger Tour (1–2)

Result	W–L	Date	Tournament	Tier	Surface	Partner	Opponents	Score
Win	1–0	Sep 2022	Copa Sevilla, Spain	Challenger	Clay	(Argentina) Facundo Díaz Acosta	(Spain) Nicolás Álvarez Varona (Spain) Alberto Barroso Campos	7–5, 6–7^{(8–10)}, [10–7]
Loss	1–1	Sep 2022	Buenos Aires Challenger, Argentina	Challenger	Clay	(Argentina) Facundo Díaz Acosta	(Argentina) Guido Andreozzi (Argentina) Guillermo Durán	0–6, 5–7
Loss	1–2	Aug 2023	Internazionali di Tennis Città di Todi, Italy	Challenger	Clay	(Brazil) Orlando Luz	(Brazil) Fernando Romboli (Brazil) Marcelo Zormann	7–6^{(15–13)}, 4–6, [5–19]

== ITF World Tennis Tour finals ==
=== Singles: 4 (3 titles, 1 runner-up) ===
Legend ITF WTT (3–1)	Finals by surface Hard (–) Clay (3–1)

Result	W–L	Date	Tournament	Tier	Surface	Opponent	Score
Win	1–0	Aug 2021	M15 Gdynia, Poland	WTT	Clay	(Canada) Filip Peliwo	6–7^{(2–7)}, 7–6^{(7–3)}, 6–1
Win	2–0	Aug 2021	M25 Poznań, Poland	WTT	Clay	(Poland) Paweł Ciaś	5–7, 6–3, 6–2
Loss	2–1	Mar 2022	M15 Antalya, Turkey	WTT	Clay	(Austria) Lukas Neumayer	4–6, 6–1, 2–6
Win	3–1	Dec 2022	M25 Vacaria, Brazil	WTT	Clay (i)	(Brazil) Orlando Luz	0–6, 6–4, 6–0

=== Doubles: 5 (3 titles, 2 runner-ups) ===
Legend ITF WTT (3–2)	Finals by surface Hard (–) Clay (3–2)

Result	W–L	Date	Tournament	Tier	Surface	Partner	Opponents	Score
Win	1–0	Jul 2021	M15 Bergamo, Italy	WTT	Clay	(Argentina) Juan Ignacio Galarza	(United States) Dali Blanch (Brazil) Pedro Boscardin Dias	6–4, 6–3
Win	2–0	Jul 2021	M15 Poprad, Slovakia	WTT	Clay	(Argentina) Fermín Tenti	(Switzerland) Luca Castelnuovo (Czech Republic) Dominik Palán	6–3, 6–3
Win	3–0	Mar 2022	M15 Antalya, Turkey	WTT	Clay	(United Kingdom) Felix Gill	(Turkey) Sarp Ağabigün (Croatia) Admir Kalender	6–4, 6–3
Loss	3–1	Mar 2022	M25 Antalya, Turkey	WTT	Clay	(Italy) Alexander Weis	(Turkey) Sarp Ağabigün (Ukraine) Oleksii Krutykh	4–6, 6–7^{(3–7)}
Loss	3–2	Apr 2022	M25 Rosario, Argentina	WTT	Clay	(Argentina) Juan Ignacio Galarza	(Bolivia) Murkel Dellien (Peru) Arklon Huertas del Pino	3–6, 5–7

== Exhibition matches ==
=== Singles ===
Result	Date	Tournament	Surface	Opponent	Score
Loss	Dec 2025	Road to Australia, Buenos Aires, Argentina	Hard	(Argentina) Mariano Navone	5–7, 6–4, [7–10]

== Wins over top 10 players ==
- Burruchaga's record against players who were, at the time the match was played, ranked in the top 10.

Season	2026	Total
Wins	1	1

No.	Player	Rk	Tournament	Surface	Rd	Score	Rk
2026
1.	(Italy) Flavio Cobolli	9	Croatia Open, Croatia	Clay	2R	6–2, 6–4	67

*As of 17 July 2026
