= Marcelo Zormann =

Brazilian tennis player

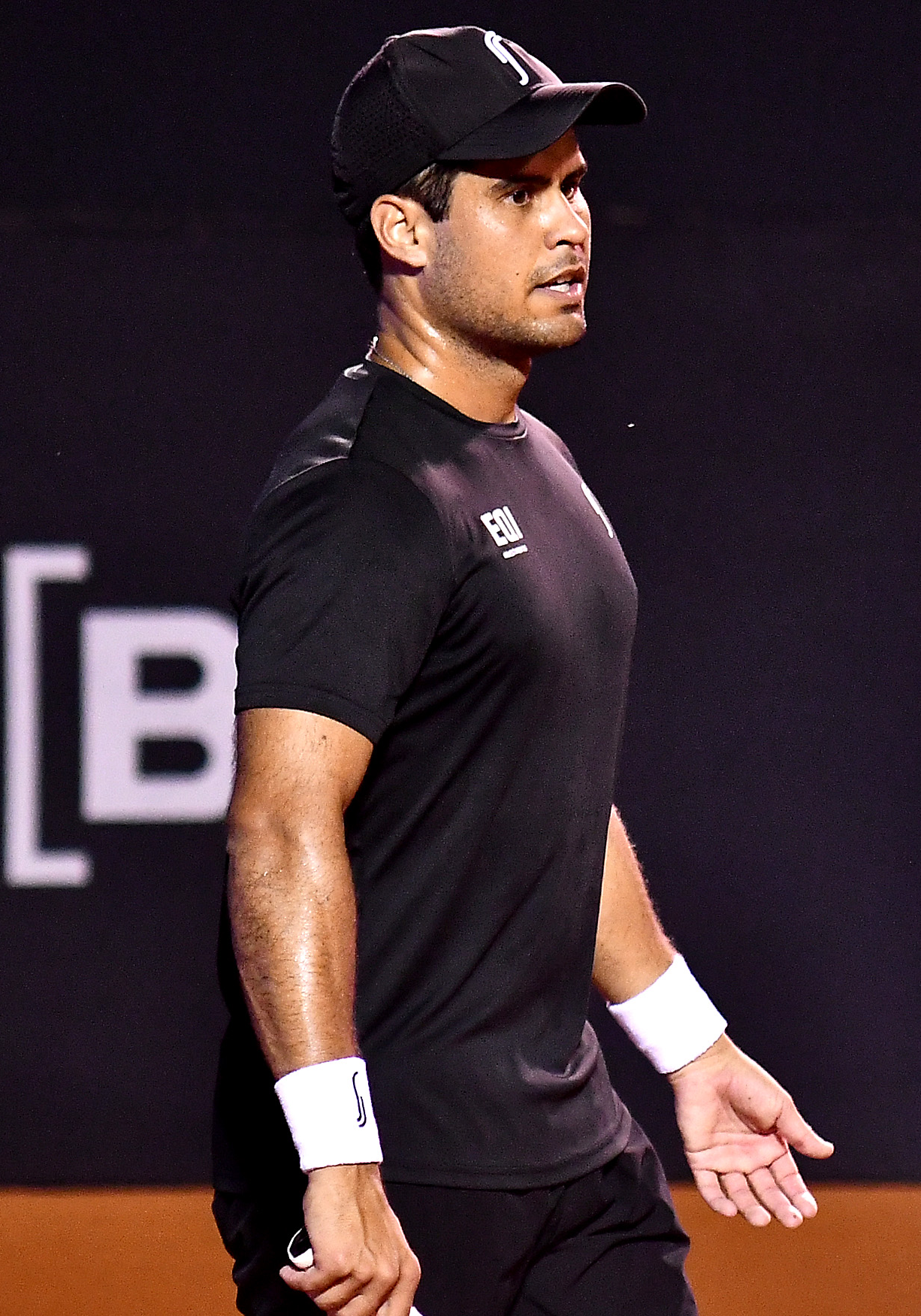
- Full name: Marcelo Zormann da Silva
- Country (sports): Brazil
- Residence: Itajaí, Brazil
- Born: 10 June 1996 (age 30) Lins, São Paulo, Brazil
- Height: 1.80 m (5 ft 11 in)
- Plays: Right-handed (two-handed backhand)
- Prize money: $166,573

Singles
- Career record: 0–0
- Career titles: 3 ITF
- Highest ranking: No. 467 (13 June 2016)
- Current ranking: No. 1574 (6 January 2025)

Doubles
- Career record: 2–6
- Career titles: 8 ATP Challenger Tour
- Highest ranking: No. 92 (20 May 2024)
- Current ranking: No. 95 (6 January 2025)

Grand Slam doubles results
- Australian Open: 1R (2025)
- French Open: 1R (2024)
Medal record
Representing Brazil
Youth Olympic Games
Gold medal – first place	2014 Nanjing	Doubles
- Last updated on: 6 January 2025.

Marcelo Zormann da Silva (born 10 June 1996) is a Brazilian tennis player. He has a career high ATP doubles ranking of world No. 92 achieved on 20 May 2024. He also has an ATP career high singles ranking of No. 467 achieved on 13 June 2016.

== Career ==
Zormann along with Orlando Luz won the 2014 Wimbledon boys' doubles title after defeating Stefan Kozlov and Andrey Rublev 6–4, 3–6, 8–6 in the final.

He made a first time appearance in the main draw at the 2024 Rio Open as a qualifying pair with Joao Fonseca, after receiving a wildcard in doubles qualifying.

He reached the top 100 in the doubles rankings on 15 April 2024 at world No. 98. He made his Grand Slam debut at the 2024 French Open as an alternate pair partnering Orlando Luz.

== ATP Challenger and Futures/ITF World Tennis Tour finals ==
=== Singles: 7 (3–4) ===
Legend (singles) ATP Challenger Tour (0–0) Futures/ITF World Tennis Tour (3–4)	Finals by surface Hard (0–0) Clay (3–4) Grass (0–0) Carpet (0–0)

Result	W–L	Date	Tournament	Tier	Surface	Opponent	Score
Win	1–0	Oct 2013	Brazil F12, Montes Claros	Futures	Clay	(Brazil) Caio Silva	6–3, 6–3
Loss	1–1	Jun 2014	France F10, Mont-de-Marsan	Futures	Clay	(France) Medy Chettar	4–6, 4–6
Win	2–1	Sep 2015	Croatia F15, Bol	Futures	Clay	(Serbia) Miki Janković	6–4, 6–2
Loss	2–2	Nov 2015	Brazil F6, Porto Alegre	Futures	Clay	(Brazil) C. Severino	6–3, 3–6, 4–6
Win	3–2	May 2016	Argentina F6, Villa del Dique	Futures	Clay	(Argentina) Federico Coria	6–4, 7–6^{(7–5)}
Loss	3–3	May 2018	Brazil F3, Brasília	Futures	Clay	(Brazil) O. Gutierrez	2–6, 2–6
Loss	3–4	Nov 2022	M25 Lajeado, Brazil	World Tennis Tour	Clay	(Brazil) Eduardo Ribeiro	2–6, 2–6

=== Doubles: 53 (31–22) ===
Legend (doubles) ATP Challenger Tour (11–8) Futures/ITF World Tennis Tour (20–14)	Finals by surface Hard (0–1) Clay (31–21) Grass (0–0) Carpet (0–0)

Result	W–L	Date	Tournament	Tier	Surface	Partner	Opponents	Score
Loss	0–1	Oct 2013	Brazil F12, Montes Claros	Futures	Clay	(Brazil) Luís Britto	(Brazil) Gabriel Vellinho Hocevar (Brazil) Rafael Matos	5–7, 5–7
Win	1–1	Jun 2015	Brazil F2, Itajaí	Futures	Clay	(Brazil) Rafael Matos	(Brazil) Felipe Meligeni Alves (Brazil) Igor Marcondes	6–7^{(5–7)}, 6–2, 10–8
Loss	1–2	Aug 2015	Italy F23, Este	Futures	Clay	(Brazil) Rafael Matos	(Austria) Maximilian Neuchrist (Austria) Tristan-Samuel Weissborn	6–2, 3–6, [8–10]
Win	2–2	Sep 2015	Croatia F14, Bol	Futures	Clay	(Brazil) Rafael Matos	(Hungary) Gábor Borsos (Hungary) Ádám Kellner	6–3, 2–6, [10–5]
Win	3–2	Nov 2015	Brazil F6, Porto Alegre	Futures	Clay	(Brazil) Orlando Luz	(Brazil) Ricardo Hocevar (Brazil) Carlos Eduardo Severino	3–6, 6–3, [10–6]
Win	4–2	May 2016	Argentina F5, Villa María	Futures	Clay	(Brazil) João Pedro Sorgi	(Argentina) Mariano Kestelboim (Argentina) Matías Zukas	6–2, 3–6, [10–2]
Win	5–2	May 2016	Argentina F6, Villa del Dique	Futures	Clay	(Brazil) João Pedro Sorgi	(Brazil) Oscar Jose Gutierrez (Argentina) Gabriel Alejandro Hidalgo	6–2, 6–3
Win	6–2	May 2016	Argentina F7, Córdoba	Futures	Clay	(Brazil) João Pedro Sorgi	(Chile) Guillermo Rivera Aránguiz (Chile) Juan Carlos Sáez	6–4, 3–6, [11–9]
Win	7–2	Dec 2016	Uruguay F3, Salto	Futures	Clay	(Brazil) Orlando Luz	(Uruguay) Marcel Felder (Argentina) Gabriel Alejandro Hidalgo	7–6^{(7–2)}, 6–4
Win	8–2	Apr 2017	Spain F11, Majadahonda	Futures	Clay	(Brazil) Rafael Matos	(Spain) Alberto Romero Senise (Spain) Miguel Semmler	3–6, 7–6^{(7–5)}, [11–9]
Win	9–2	Jun 2017	Italy F18, Sassuolo	Futures	Clay	(Brazil) Orlando Luz	(Italy) Marco Bortolotti (Italy) Walter Trusendi	6–3, 6–3
Loss	9–3	Aug 2017	Portugal F14, Porto	Futures	Clay	(Brazil) Rafael Matos	(Portugal) Tiago Cação (Portugal) Nuno Deus	6–2, 4–6, [8–10]
Win	10–3	Aug 2017	Spain F25, Vigo	Futures	Clay	(Brazil) Rafael Matos	(Spain) Marc Fornell Mestres (Spain) Marc Giner	6–3, 7–6^{(7–4)}
Loss	10–4	Sep 2017	Tunisia F27, Hammamet	Futures	Clay	(Brazil) Luís Britto	(Finland) Harri Heliövaara (United States) Evan Zhu	1–6, 4–6
Loss	10–5	Oct 2017	Tunisia F28, Hammamet	Futures	Clay	(Brazil) Luís Britto	(France) Laurent Rochette (Spain) Pol Toledo Bagué	4–6, 1–6
Loss	10–6	Oct 2017	Tunisia F30, Hammamet	Futures	Clay	(Brazil) Rafael Matos	(Croatia) Nino Serdarušić (Italy) Cristian Carli	7–6^{(8–6)}, 4–6, [7–10]
Win	11–6	Nov 2017	Brazil F2, Santos	Futures	Clay	(Brazil) Orlando Luz	(Brazil) Caio Silva (Brazil) Thales Turini	6–3, 6–3
Win	12–6	Nov 2017	Brazil F3, São Paulo	Futures	Clay	(Brazil) Rafael Matos	(Brazil) Caio Silva (Brazil) Thales Turini	7–6^{(8–6)}, 5–7, [10–8]
Loss	12–7	Mar 2018	Turkey F10, Antalya	Futures	Clay	(Brazil) Rafael Matos	(Italy) Antonio Massara (Colombia) Cristian Rodríguez	3–6, 6–7^{(3–7)}
Loss	12–8	Mar 2018	Turkey F11, Antalya	Futures	Clay	(Brazil) Rafael Matos	(Turkey) Cem Ilkel (Turkey) Altuğ Çelikbilek	6–1, 4–6, [8–10]
Win	13–8	Apr 2018	Brazil F1, São José do Rio Preto	Futures	Clay	(Brazil) Rafael Matos	(Brazil) Pedro Bernardi (Brazil) Daniel Dutra da Silva	6–1, 6–4
Win	14–8	May 2018	Brazil F2, São Paulo	Futures	Clay	(Brazil) Rafael Matos	(Brazil) Eduardo Dischinger (Brazil) Wilson Leite	7–5, 3–6, [10–4]
Win	15–8	May 2018	Brazil F4, Curitiba	Futures	Clay	(Brazil) Rafael Matos	(Brazil) Diego Matos (Brazil) Thales Turini	7–6^{(7–2)}, 6–3
Loss	15–9	Jul 2018	Czech Republic F4, Pardubice	Futures	Clay	(Brazil) Rafael Matos	(Hungary) Gabor Borsos (Austria) David Pichler	6–1, 2–6, [6–10]
Loss	15–10	Jul 2018	Germany F8, Kassel	Futures	Clay	(Brazil) Orlando Luz	(Brazil) João Souza (Spain) David Vega Hernández	1–6, 4–6
Loss	15–11	Sep 2021	M15 Recife, Brazil	Futures	Clay	(Brazil) Daniel Dutra da Silva	(Brazil) Pedro Boscardin Dias (Brazil) Gustavo Heide	6–7^{(1−7)}, 6–3, [8−10]
Loss	15–12	Dec 2021	M15 Cancún, Mexico	Futures	Hard	(Brazil) Luís Britto	(Canada) Liam Draxl (Canada) Cleeve Harper	5−7, 6–7^{(4−7)}
Win	16–12	May 2022	M25 Vic, Spain	Futures	Clay	(Brazil) Oscar Jose Gutierrez	(Portugal) Tiago Cação (Spain) Benjamín Winter López	6–1, 6–4
Loss	16–13	Jun 2022	M15 Duffel, Belgium	Futures	Clay	(Argentina) Franco Emanuel Egea	(Luxembourg) Alex Knaff (Luxembourg) Chris Rodesch	1−6, 4–6
Win	17–13	Jun 2022	M25 Den Haag, Netherlands	Futures	Clay	(Brazil) Orlando Luz	(Australia) James Frawley (Australia) Akira Santillan	7–6^{(7−5)}, 2–6, [11−9]
Win	18–13	Aug 2022	M15 Recife, Brazil	Futures	Clay	(Brazil) Luís Britto	(Brazil) Gabriel Pascotto Tumasonis (Brazil) Fernando Yamacita	6–4, 6–4
Loss	18–14	Aug 2022	M15 Brasília, Brazil	Futures	Clay	(Brazil) Luís Britto	(Brazil) Eduardo Ribeiro (Brazil) Gabriel Roveri Sidney	3–6, 7–6^{(7−2)}, [8−10]
Win	19–14	Oct 2022	M25 Rio de Janeiro, Brazil	Futures	Clay	(Brazil) Orlando Luz	(Brazil) Wilson Leite (Brazil) José Pereira	6–4, 6–2
Win	20–14	Nov 2022	M25 Lajeado, Brazil	Futures	Clay	(Brazil) Orlando Luz	(Brazil) João Victor Couto Loureiro (Brazil) Gustavo Heide	6–3, 6–2
Win	21–14	Jan 2023	Piracicaba, Brazil	Challenger	Clay	(Brazil) Orlando Luz	(Argentina) Andrea Collarini (Argentina) Renzo Olivo	walkover
Loss	21–15	Jun 2023	Vicenza, Italy	Challenger	Clay	(Brazil) Fernando Romboli	(India) Anirudh Chandrasekar (India) Vijay Sundar Prashanth	3–6, 2–6
Win	22–15	Jul 2023	San Benedetto del Tronto, Italy	Challenger	Clay	(Brazil) Fernando Romboli	(Ecuador) Diego Hidalgo (Colombia) Cristian Rodriguez	6–3, 6–4
Loss	22–16	Aug 2023	Meerbusch, Germany	Challenger	Clay	(Brazil) Fernando Romboli	(France) Manuel Guinard (France) Grégoire Jacq	5–7, 6–7^{(3–7)}
Win	23–16	Aug 2023	Todi, Italy	Challenger	Clay	(Brazil) Fernando Romboli	(Argentina) Román Andrés Burruchaga (Brazil) Orlando Luz	6–7^{(13–15)}, 6–4, [10–5]
Loss	23–17	Oct 2023	Buenos Aires, Argentina	Challenger	Clay	(Brazil) Fernando Romboli	(Ecuador) Diego Hidalgo (Colombia) Cristian Rodriguez	3–6, 2–6
Win	24–17	Mar 2024	Santiago, Chile	Challenger	Clay	(Brazil) Fernando Romboli	(Bolivia) Boris Arias (Bolivia) Federico Zeballos	7–6^{(7–5)}, 6–4
Win	25–17	Jun 2024	Poznań, Poland	Challenger	Clay	(Brazil) Orlando Luz	(Germany) Jakob Schnaitter (Germany) Mark Wallner	5–7, 6–2, [10–6]
Loss	25–18	Sep 2024	Buenos Aires, Argentina	Challenger	Clay	(Brazil) Felipe Meligeni Alves	(Bolivia) Murkel Dellien (Argentina) Facundo Mena	6–1, 2–6, [10–12]
Win	26–18	Oct 2024	Villa María, Argentina	Challenger	Clay	(Brazil) Orlando Luz	(Bolivia) Boris Arias (Bolivia) Federico Zeballos	0–6, 6–3, [10–4]
Loss	26–19	Oct 2024	Guayaquil, Ecuador	Challenger	Clay	(Brazil) Luís Britto	(Poland) Karol Drzewiecki (Poland) Piotr Matuszewski	4–6, 6–7^{(2–7)}
Win	27–19	Jan 2026	Buenos Aires, Argentina	Challenger	Clay	(Argentina) Mariano Kestelboim	(Romania) Alexandru Jecan (Romania) Bogdan Pavel	6–3, 6–4
Loss	27–20	Jan 2026	Concepción, Chile	Challenger	Clay	(Argentina) Mariano Kestelboim	(Ecuador) Gonzalo Escobar (Brazil) Eduardo Ribeiro	6–7^{(4–7)}, 4–6
Loss	27–21	Mar 2026	Brasília, Brazil	Challenger	Clay	(Argentina) Mariano Kestelboim	(Portugal) Jaime Faria (Portugal) Henrique Rocha	3–6, 2–6
Win	28–21	Mar 2026	Asunción, Paraguay	Challenger	Clay	(Argentina) Mariano Kestelboim	(United States) Mac Kiger (United States) Reese Stalder	6–4, 7–5
Loss	28–22	Apr 2026	Campinas, Brazil	Challenger	Clay	(Argentina) Mariano Kestelboim	(Spain) Nicolás Álvarez Varona (Spain) Mario Mansilla Díez	6–3, 1–6, [8–10]
Win	29–22	Sep 2026	Curitiba, Brazil	Challenger	Clay	(Argentina) Mariano Kestelboim	(Brazil) Guto Miguel (Brazil) Eduardo Ribeiro	5–7, 7–6^{(7–3)}, [10–7]
Win	30–22	Oct 2026	Antofagasta, Chile	Challenger	Clay	(Brazil) Eduardo Ribeiro	(Mexico) Alan Magadán (Peru) Alexander Merino	6–1, 6–3
Win	31–22	Oct 2026	Cali, Colombia	Challenger	Clay	(Bolivia) Federico Zeballos	(Mexico) Alan Magadán (Mexico) Rodrigo Pacheco Méndez	5–5 retired

== Junior Grand Slam finals ==
=== Doubles: 1 (1 title) ===
Result	Year	Tournament	Surface	Partner	Opponents	Score
Win	2014	Wimbledon	Grass	(Brazil) Orlando Luz	(United States) Stefan Kozlov (Russia) Andrey Rublev	6–4, 3–6, 8–6

== Olympic medal matches ==
=== Doubles ===
Outcome	Year	Championship	Surface	Partner	Opponents	Score
Gold	2014	Nanjing Youth Olympics	Hard	(Brazil) Orlando Luz	(Russia) Karen Khachanov (Russia) Andrey Rublev	7–5, 3–6, [10–3]
