= Piracicaba Challenger =

Brasil Tennis Challenger
- 2025 Brasil Tennis Challenger

ATP Challenger Tour
- Event name: Brasil Tennis Challenger
- Location: Piracicaba, Brazil
- Venue: Centro Cultural e Recreativo Cristóvão Colombo
- Category: ATP Challenger 100 (2025)
- Surface: Clay
- Prize money: $160,000
- Website: Website

The Brasil Tennis Challenger is a professional tennis tournament played on clay courts. It is currently part of the Association of Tennis Professionals (ATP) Challenger Tour. It was first held in Piracicaba, Brazil in 2023.

== Past finals ==
=== Singles ===
Year	Champion	Runner-up	Score
2026	(Brazil) Thiago Seyboth Wild	(Argentina) Gonzalo Villanueva	6–2, 6–2
2025	(Argentina) Román Andrés Burruchaga	(Argentina) Facundo Mena	7–6^{(10–8)}, 6–7^{(6–8)}, 7–6^{(7–4)}
2024	(Argentina) Camilo Ugo Carabelli	(Argentina) Federico Coria	7–5, 6–4
2023	(Argentina) Andrea Collarini	(Chile) Tomás Barrios Vera	6–2, 7–6^{(7–1)}

=== Doubles ===
Year	Champions	Runners-up	Score
2026	(Brazil) Luís Felipe Miguel (Brazil) Paulo André Saraiva dos Santos	(Peru) Arklon Huertas del Pino (Peru) Conner Huertas del Pino	6–3, 7–6^{(7–0)}
2025	(Argentina) Guido Andreozzi (Brazil) Orlando Luz	(Brazil) Marcelo Demoliner (Brazil) Fernando Romboli	6–7^{(4–7)}, 6–2, [11–9]
2024	(Argentina) Guido Andreozzi (Argentina) Guillermo Durán	(Brazil) Daniel Dutra da Silva (Brazil) Pedro Sakamoto	6–2, 7–6^{(7–5)}
2023	(Brazil) Orlando Luz (Brazil) Marcelo Zormann	(Argentina) Andrea Collarini (Argentina) Renzo Olivo	Walkover
