= Orlando Luz =

Brazilian tennis player

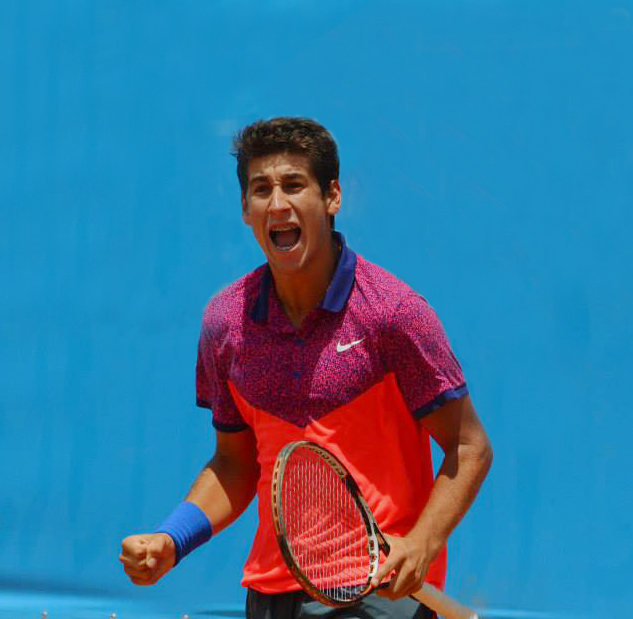
- Luz in 2014
- Full name: Orlando Moraes Luz
- Country (sports): Brazil
- Residence: Balneário Camboriú, Brazil
- Born: 8 February 1998 (age 28) Carazinho, Brazil
- Height: 1.80 m (5 ft 11 in)
- Plays: Right-handed (two-handed backhand)
- Coach: José Luis López
- Prize money: US $1,274,986

Singles
- Career record: 1–2
- Career titles: 0
- Highest ranking: No. 272 (16 August 2021)
- Current ranking: No. 873 (24 August 2026)

Doubles
- Career record: 58–44
- Career titles: 5
- Highest ranking: No. 13 (24 August 2026)
- Current ranking: No. 18 (2 November 2026)

Grand Slam doubles results
- Australian Open: QF (2026)
- French Open: QF (2025)
- Wimbledon: 1R (2025, 2026)
- US Open: 2R (2025)

Grand Slam mixed doubles results
- French Open: 1R (2026)
Medal record
Representing Brazil
Youth Olympic Games
Gold medal – first place	2014 Nanjing	Doubles
Silver medal – second place	2014 Nanjing	Singles
South American Games
Gold medal – first place	2022 Asunción	Doubles
- Last updated on: 20 November 2026.

Orlando Moraes Luz (born 8 February 1998) is a Brazilian professional tennis player who specializes in doubles. He has a career-high ATP doubles ranking of world No. 13 achieved on 24 August 2026. He has won five ATP Tour doubles titles, all of them with compatriot Rafael Matos.

Luz' most notable results are two Masters 1000 titles at the 2026 Canadian Open and at the 2026 Cincinnati Open.

He also reached a singles ranking of No. 272 on 16 August 2021.

== Junior career ==
Luz had notable results on the ITF junior circuit. He won the 2014 Wimbledon boys' doubles, playing with compatriot Marcelo Zormann. The pair defeated Stefan Kozlov and Andrey Rublev 6–4, 3–6, 8–6 in the final.

At the 2014 Summer Youth Olympics held in Nanjing China, seeded second, Luz won the silver medal in boys' singles, falling to Kamil Majchrzak of Poland in the final. Additionally, he and Marcelo Zormann teamed up again to win the gold medal in doubles, defeating the Russian duo of Andrey Rublev and Karen Khachanov 7–5, 3–6, [10–3] in the final.

Luz and Chung Yun-seong lost to Yishai Oliel of Israel and Patrik Rikl of the Czech Republic in the final of the 2016 French Open Boys' Doubles tournament, 6–3, 6–4.

Additionally, Orlando Luz reached ITF junior World No. 1 on 25 May 2015, when he was 17 years old, becoming one of the few Brazilians to achieve the feat, along with reaching the 2015 Australian Open Boys Final.

== Professional career ==
Luz made his ATP debut on 6 March 2017, when he was given a wildcard to the first round of the Brasil Open where he was defeated by Gastão Elias.

In 2018, Luz won the first edition of the Maria Esther Bueno Cup, an under-24 men's tennis tournament associated with the Rio Open.

At the 2020 Rio Open, Luz alongside Rafael Matos defeated the 2019 Wimbledon and 2019 US Open champions, and ATP doubles World No. 1, Juan Sebastián Cabal and Robert Farah 6–1, 4–6, [10–8].

=== 2024-2025: Grand Slam debut and first win ===
Luz made his Grand Slam debut at the 2024 French Open as an alternate pair partnering Marcelo Zormann after reaching the top 100 on 20 May 2024 at world No. 99. In July 2024, Luz won his first ATP title with Rafael Matos at the 2024 Swedish Open.

Luz recorded his first Grand Slam win at the 2025 Australian Open partnering Gregoire Jacq over alternate pair Jeevan Nedunchezhiyan and Vijay Sundar Prashanth.

In doubles in 2025, Luz's best performance was reaching the quarterfinals at Roland Garros alongside Ivan Dodig. He also reached the quarterfinals at the Rio de Janeiro ATP 500 and the semifinals at the ATP 250 events in Båstad and Umag, in addition to winning three Challenger titles.

=== 2026: Successive Masters 1000 titles, top 15 ===
In early 2026, he reunited in a partnership with Rafael Matos and they reached the quarterfinals of the Australian Open, won the ATP 250 tournaments in Buenos Aires and in Santiago, finished as runners-up at the ATP 250 events in Houston and in Estoril, and were semifinalists at the ATP 500 in Munich.

In August, Luz and Matos won their first Masters 1000-level title at the Canadian Open, defeating third seeds Marcelo Arévalo and Mate Pavić in the final. Subsequently, they won another Masters 1000 title—this time in Cincinnati—with Luz climbing from the world's top 40 in the doubles rankings to the top 15 on 24 August 2026.

== ATP Masters 1000 finals ==
=== Doubles: (2 titles) ===
Result	Year	Tournament	Surface	Partner	Opponents	Score
Win	2026	Canadian Open	Hard	(Brazil) Rafael Matos	(El Salvador) Marcelo Arévalo (Croatia) Mate Pavić	5−7, 6−4, [10−6]
Win	2026	Cincinnati Open	Hard	(Brazil) Rafael Matos	(Germany) Constantin Frantzen (Netherlands) Robin Haase	6–4, 3–6, [10–7]

== ATP Tour finals ==
=== Doubles: 8 (5 titles, 3 runner-ups) ===
Legend Grand Slam (–) ATP 1000 (2–0) ATP 500 (–) ATP 250 (3–3)	Finals by surface Hard (2–0) Clay (3–3) Grass (–)	Finals by setting Outdoor (5–3) Indoor (–)

Result	W–L	Date	Tournament	Tier	Surface	Partner	Opponents	Score
Loss	0–1	Feb 2024	Chile Open, Chile	ATP 250	Clay	(Chile) Matías Soto	(Chile) Tomás Barrios Vera (Chile) Alejandro Tabilo	2–6, 4–6
Win	1–1	Jul 2024	Swedish Open, Sweden	ATP 250	Clay	(Brazil) Rafael Matos	(France) Manuel Guinard (France) Grégoire Jacq	7–5, 6–4
Win	2–1	Feb 2026	Argentina Open, Argentina	ATP 250	Clay	(Brazil) Rafael Matos	(Argentina) Andrea Collarini (Argentina) Nicolás Kicker	7–5, 6–3
Win	3–1	Feb 2026	Chile Open, Chile	ATP 250	Clay	(Brazil) Rafael Matos	(Uruguay) Ariel Behar (Australia) Matthew Romios	6–4, 6–3
Loss	3–2	Apr 2026	U.S. Men's Clay Court Championships, US	ATP 250	Clay	(Brazil) Rafael Matos	(Ecuador) Andrés Andrade (United States) Ben Shelton	6–4, 3–6, [6–10]
Loss	3–3	Jul 2026	Estoril Open, Portugal	ATP 250	Clay	(Brazil) Rafael Matos	(France) Titouan Droguet (France) Kyrian Jacquet	6–7^{(2–7)}, 7–6^{(7–4)}, [9–11]
Win	4–3	Aug 2026	Canadian Open, Canada	ATP 1000	Hard	(Brazil) Rafael Matos	(El Salvador) Marcelo Arévalo (Croatia) Mate Pavić	5−7, 6−4, [10−6]
Win	5–3	Aug 2026	Cincinnati Open, United States	ATP 1000	Hard	(Brazil) Rafael Matos	(Germany) Constantin Frantzen (Netherlands) Robin Haase	6–4, 3–6, [10–7]

== ATP Challenger Tour finals ==
=== Singles: 1 (runner-up) ===
Legend ATP Challenger (0–1)

Result	W–L	Date	Tournament	Tier	Surface	Opponent	Score
Loss	0–1	Aug 2021	San Marino Open, San Marino	Challenger	Clay	(Denmark) Holger Rune	6–1, 2–6, 3–6

=== Doubles: 38 (24 titles, 14 runner-ups) ===
Legend ATP Challenger (24–14)	Finals by surface Hard (2–2) Clay (22–12)

Result	W–L	Date	Tournament	Tier	Surface	Partner	Opponents	Score
Win	1–0	Jun 2019	Little Rock Challenger, US	Challenger	Hard	(Argentina) Matías Franco Descotte	(Philippines) Treat Huey (United States) Max Schnur	7–5, 1–6, [12–10]
Loss	1–1	Aug 2019	Open Castilla y León, Spain	Challenger	Hard	(Brazil) Felipe Meligeni Alves	(Netherlands) Sander Arends (Netherlands) David Pel	4–6, 6–7^{(3–7)}
Win	2–1	Oct 2019	São Paulo-Campinas Challenger, Brazil	Challenger	Clay	(Brazil) Rafael Matos	(Mexico) Miguel Ángel Reyes-Varela (Brazil) Fernando Romboli	6–7^{(2–7)}, 6–4, [10–8]
Loss	2–2	Oct 2019	Milex Santo Domingo Open, Dominican Republic	Challenger	Clay	(Venezuela) Luis David Martínez	(Uruguay) Ariel Behar (Ecuador) Gonzalo Escobar	7–6^{(7–5)}, 4–6, [10–12]
Loss	2–3	Nov 2019	Uruguay Open, Uruguay	Challenger	Clay	(Brazil) Rafael Matos	(Argentina) Facundo Bagnis (Argentina) Andrés Molteni	4–6, 7–5, [10–12]
Win	3–3	Feb 2020	Punta Open, Uruguay	Challenger	Clay	(Brazil) Rafael Matos	(Argentina) Juan Manuel Cerúndolo (Argentina) Thiago Agustín Tirante	6–4, 6–2
Loss	3–4	Mar 2020	Monterrey Challenger, Mexico	Challenger	Hard	(Brazil) Rafael Matos	(Poland) Karol Drzewiecki (Portugal) Gonçalo Oliveira	7–6^{(7–5)}, 4–6, [9–11]
Win	4–4	Feb 2021	Challenger Concepción, Chile	Challenger	Clay	(Brazil) Rafael Matos	(Peru) Sergio Galdós (Ecuador) Diego Hidalgo	7–5, 6–4
Win	5–4	Apr 2021	Tallahassee Tennis Challenger, US	Challenger	Clay (green)	(Brazil) Rafael Matos	(United States) Sekou Bangoura (United States) Donald Young	7–6^{(7–2)}, 6–2
Win	6–4	Jun 2021	Internazionali Città di Forlì, Italy	Challenger	Clay	(Peru) Sergio Galdós	(Argentina) Pedro Cachín (Argentina) Camilo Ugo Carabelli	7–5, 2–6, [10–8]
Win	7–4	Jul 2021	Iași Open, Romania	Challenger	Clay	(Brazil) Felipe Meligeni Alves	(Argentina) Hernán Casanova (Spain) Roberto Ortega Olmedo	6–3, 6–4
Loss	7–5	Jul 2021	Tampere Open, Finland	Challenger	Clay	(Brazil) Felipe Meligeni Alves	(Argentina) Pedro Cachín (Argentina) Facundo Mena	5–7, 3–6
Win	8–5	Jul 2021	Internazionali Città di Trieste, Italy	Challenger	Clay	(Brazil) Felipe Meligeni Alves	(France) Antoine Hoang (France) Albano Olivetti	7–5, 6–7^{(6–8)}, [10–5]
Win	9–5	Aug 2021	Internazionali del Friuli Venezia Giulia, Italy	Challenger	Clay	(Brazil) Rafael Matos	(Peru) Sergio Galdós (Argentina) Renzo Olivo	6–4, 7–6^{(7–5)}
Win	10–5	Sep 2021	Kyiv Open, Ukraine	Challenger	Clay	(Kazakhstan) Aleksandr Nedovyesov	(Ukraine) Denys Molchanov (Ukraine) Sergiy Stakhovsky	6–4, 6–4
Win	11–5	Dec 2021	Rio Tennis Classic, Brazil	Challenger	Hard	(Brazil) Rafael Matos	(United States) James Cerretani (Brazil) Fernando Romboli	6–3, 7–6^{(7–2)}
Loss	11–6	May 2022	Salvador Challenger, Brazil	Challenger	Clay	(Brazil) Felipe Meligeni Alves	(Ecuador) Diego Hidalgo (Colombia) Cristian Rodríguez	5–7, 1–6
Loss	11–7	Aug 2022	Lima Challenger, Peru	Challenger	Clay	(Argentina) Camilo Ugo Carabelli	(Uruguay) Ignacio Carou (Argentina) Facundo Mena	2–6, 2–6
Win	12–7	Jan 2023	Brasil Tennis Challenger, Brazil	Challenger	Clay	(Brazil) Marcelo Zormann	(Argentina) Andrea Collarini (Argentina) Renzo Olivo	walkover
Loss	12–8	Jun 2023	Cali Open, Colombia	Challenger	Clay	(Ukraine) Oleg Prihodko	(Argentina) Guido Andreozzi (Colombia) Cristian Rodríguez	3–6, 4–6
Loss	12–9	Jun 2023	Open Rionegro, Colombia	Challenger	Clay	(Ukraine) Oleg Prihodko	(Colombia) Juan Sebastián Gómez (Colombia) Andrés Urrea	3–6, 6–7^{(10–12)}
Loss	12–10	Aug 2023	Internazionali Città di Todi, Italy	Challenger	Clay	(Argentina) Román Andrés Burruchaga	(Brazil) Fernando Romboli (Brazil) Marcelo Zormann	7–6^{(15–13)}, 4–6, [5–10]
Loss	12–11	Sep 2023	Open de Bogotá, Colombia	Challenger	Clay	(Argentina) Guillermo Durán	(Argentina) Renzo Olivo (Argentina) Thiago Agustín Tirante	6–7^{(6–8)}, 4–6
Loss	12–12	Nov 2023	Lima Challenger II, Peru	Challenger	Clay	(Colombia) Nicolás Barrientos	(Brazil) Mateus Alves (Brazil) Eduardo Ribeiro	6–3, 5–7, [8–10]
Win	13–12	Mar 2024	São Léo Open, Brazil	Challenger	Clay	(Brazil) Marcelo Demoliner	(Canada) Liam Draxl (Italy) Alexander Weis	7–5, 3–6, [10–8]
Win	14–12	Jun 2024	Poznań Open, Poland	Challenger	Clay	(Brazil) Marcelo Zormann	(Germany) Jakob Schnaitter (Germany) Mark Wallner	5–7, 6–2, [10–6]
Loss	14–13	Jul 2024	San Marino Open, San Marino	Challenger	Clay	(France) Théo Arribagé	(Czech Republic) Petr Nouza (Czech Republic) Patrik Rikl	6–1, 5–7, [6–10]
Win	15–13	Aug 2024	Bonn Open, Germany	Challenger	Clay	(France) Théo Arribagé	(India) Jeevan Nedunchezhiyan (India) Vijay Sundar Prashanth	6–2, 6–4
Win	16–13	Oct 2024	Challenger de Villa María, Argentina	Challenger	Clay	(Brazil) Marcelo Zormann	(Bolivia) Boris Arias (Bolivia) Federico Zeballos	0–6, 6–3, [10–4]
Win	17–13	Oct 2024	Internacional de Campinas, Brazil	Challenger	Clay	(Brazil) Mateus Alves	(Chile) Tomás Barrios Vera (Argentina) Facundo Mena	6–3, 6–4
Win	18–13	Nov 2024	Uruguay Open, Uruguay (2)	Challenger	Clay	(Argentina) Guido Andreozzi	(Argentina) Mariano Kestelboim (Uruguay) Franco Roncadelli	4–6, 6–3, [10–8]
Win	19–13	Jan 2025	Brasil Tennis Challenger, Brazil (2)	Challenger	Clay	(Argentina) Guido Andreozzi	(Brazil) Marcelo Demoliner (Brazil) Fernando Romboli	6–7^{(4–7)}, 6–2, [11–9]
Win	20–13	Mar 2025	Murcia Open, Spain	Challenger	Clay	(France) Grégoire Jacq	(Netherlands) Jesper de Jong (Netherlands) Mats Hermans	6–4, 6–4
Loss	20–14	Mar 2025	Girona Challenger, Spain	Challenger	Clay	(France) Grégoire Jacq	(India) Anirudh Chandrasekar (Spain) David Vega Hernández	4–6, 4–6
Win	21–14	Sep 2025	Braga Open, Portugal	Challenger	Clay	(Brazil) Marcelo Demoliner	(Bulgaria) Alexander Donski (Serbia) Stefan Latinović	7–5, 5–7, [10–7]
Win	22–14	Oct 2025	Copa Faulcombridge, Spain	Challenger	Clay	(Brazil) Marcelo Demoliner	(Spain) Íñigo Cervantes (Israel) Daniel Cukierman	6–3, 3–6, [10–5]
Win	23–14	Nov 2025	Lima Challenger II, Peru (2)	Challenger	Clay	(Brazil) Marcelo Demoliner	(Colombia) Cristian Rodríguez (Bolivia) Federico Zeballos	2–6, 7–6^{(7–3)}, [10–8]
Win	24–14	Jul 2026	Brawo Open, Germany	Challenger	Clay	(Brazil) Rafael Matos	(France) Arthur Reymond (France) Luca Sanchez	7–5, 6–2

== ITF Tour finals ==
=== Singles: 21 (9 titles, 12 runner-ups) ===
Legend ITF Futures/WTT (9–12)	Finals by surface Hard (–) Clay (9–12)

Result	W–L	Date	Tournament	Tier	Surface	Opponent	Score
Loss	0–1	Aug 2015	Italy F23, Este	Futures	Clay	(Italy) Francisco Bahamonde	4–6, 3–6
Loss	0–2	Nov 2015	Brazil F7, Santa Maria	Futures	Clay	(Brazil) João Menezes	2–6, 6–7^{(5–7)}
Win	1–2	Jul 2016	Czech Republic F5, Pardubice	Futures	Clay	(Germany) Peter Torebko	6–2, 6–2
Win	2–2	Dec 2016	Uruguay F1, Punta del Este	Futures	Clay	(Brazil) João Pedro Sorgi	4–6, 6–2, 6–2
Loss	2–3	May 2017	Spain F13, Valldoreix	Futures	Clay	(Argentina) Pedro Cachín	2–6, 1–6
Loss	2–4	Jun 2017	Italy F16, Padova	Futures	Clay	(Argentina) Andrea Collarini	4–6, 4–6
Loss	2–5	May 2018	Egypt F17, Cairo	Futures	Clay	(Brazil) Felipe Meligeni Alves	6–7^{(3–7)}, 6–7^{(3–7)}
Win	3–5	May 2018	Spain F12, Vic	Futures	Clay	(Spain) Oriol Roca Batalla	7–6^{(8–6)}, 4–2 ret.
Win	4–5	Jul 2018	Germany F8, Kassel	Futures	Clay	(Brazil) João Souza	6–4, 4–6, 6–3
Loss	4–6	Apr 2019	M15 Tabarka, Tunisia	WTT	Clay	(France) Geoffrey Blancaneaux	6–7^{(2–7)}, 4–6
Loss	4–7	May 2019	M15 Tabarka, Tunisia	WTT	Clay	(Brazil) Rafael Matos	5–7, 5–7
Win	5–7	May 2019	M15 Valldoreix, Spain	WTT	Clay	(Brazil) Rafael Matos	6–3, 6–4
Win	6–7	Jul 2019	M25 Troyes, France	WTT	Clay	(France) Jules Okala	6–0, 7–5
Loss	6–8	Aug 2019	M25 Santander, Spain	WTT	Clay	(Brazil) Oscar Jose Gutierrez	4–6, 1–6
Win	7–8	Sep 2019	M25 Seville, Spain	WTT	Clay	(Spain) Sergio Gutiérrez Ferrol	6–2, 6–1
Win	8–8	May 2021	M15 Antalya, Turkey	WTT	Clay	(Italy) Giacomo Dambrosi	6–4, 3–6, 6–4
Loss	8–9	Jul 2021	M25 Wrocław, Poland	WTT	Clay	(Argentina) Hernán Casanova	1–6, 3–6
Loss	8–10	Jun 2022	M25 Skopje, North Macedonia	WTT	Clay	(France) Laurent Lokoli	2–6, 1–6
Loss	8–11	Jun 2022	M15 Skopje, North Macedonia	WTT	Clay	(Romania) Stefan Palosi	4–6, 6–1, 3–6
Loss	8–12	Dec 2022	M25 Vacaria, Brazil	WTT	Clay (i)	(Argentina) Román Andrés Burruchaga	6–0, 4–6, 0–6
Win	9–12	Apr 2023	M15 Mogi das Cruzes, Brazil	WTT	Clay	(Uruguay) Franco Roncadelli	2–6, 6–0, 6–2

=== Doubles: 30 (24 titles, 6 runner-ups) ===
Legend ITF Futures/WTT (24–6)	Finals by surface Hard (2–1) Clay (22–5)

Result	W–L	Date	Tournament	Tier	Surface	Partner	Opponents	Score
Win	1–0	Nov 2014	Brazil F12, São Paulo	Futures	Clay	(Brazil) Fernando Romboli	(Brazil) Daniel Dutra da Silva (Brazil) Pedro Sakamoto	6–7^{(3–7)}, 6–2, [11–9]
Win	2–0	Oct 2015	Brazil F6, Porto Alegre	Futures	Clay	(Brazil) Marcelo Zormann	(Brazil) Carlos Eduardo Severino (Brazil) Ricardo Hocevar	3–6, 6–3, [10–6]
Win	3–0	Dec 2016	Uruguay F3, Salto	Futures	Clay	(Brazil) Marcelo Zormann	(Uruguay) Marcel Felder (Argentina) Gabriel Alejandro Hidalgo	7–6^{(7–2)}, 6–4
Win	4–0	Jun 2017	Italy F18, Sassuolo	Futures	Clay	(Brazil) Marcelo Zormann	(Italy) Marco Bortolotti (Italy) Walter Trusendi	6–3, 6–3
Win	5–0	Nov 2017	Brazil F2, Santos	Futures	Clay	(Brazil) Marcelo Zormann	(Brazil) Caio Silva (Brazil) Thales Turini	6–3, 6–3
Win	6–0	May 2018	Egypt F16, Cairo	Futures	Clay	(Brazil) Felipe Meligeni Alves	(Italy) Marco Bortolotti (Italy) Nicolo Turchetti	6–3, 6–4
Win	7–0	May 2018	Egypt F17, Cairo	Futures	Clay	(Egypt) M. Abdel-Aziz	(India) T.A. Chilakalapudi (India) Vignesh Peranamallur	6–1, 6–4
Win	8–0	May 2018	Spain F11, Valldoreix	Futures	Clay	(United States) Sebastian Korda	(Netherlands) Michiel de Krom (Brazil) Felipe Meligeni Alves	3–6, 6–2, [10–7]
Loss	8–1	Jul 2018	Germany F8, Kassel	Futures	Clay	(Brazil) Marcelo Zormann	(Brazil) João Souza (Spain) David Vega Hernández	1–6, 4–6
Win	9–1	Jul 2018	Portugal F12, Porto	Futures	Clay	(Brazil) Felipe Meligeni Alves	(Portugal) Fred Gil (Austria) David Pichler	7–5, 3–6, [10–6]
Win	10–1	Sep 2018	Spain F26, Oviedo	Futures	Clay	(Brazil) Felipe Meligeni Alves	(Brazil) Diego Matos (Brazil) João Pedro Sorgi	5–7, 6–4, [11–9]
Loss	10–2	Sep 2018	Spain F27, Seville	Futures	Clay	(Brazil) Felipe Meligeni Alves	(Guatemala) Christopher Díaz Figueroa (Guatemala) Wilfredo González	6–4, 6–7^{(4–7)}, [5–10]
Loss	10–3	Feb 2019	M15 Monastir, Tunisia	WTT	Hard	(Brazil) Felipe Meligeni Alves	(Italy) Erik Crepaldi (United States) Joseph van Meter	3–6, 3–6
Win	11–3	Mar 2019	M15 Portimão, Portugal	WTT	Hard	(Brazil) Rafael Matos	(Portugal) Fred Gil (Colombia) Eduardo Struvay	6–3, 6–4
Win	12–3	Mar 2019	M15 Quinta do Lago, Portugal	WTT	Hard	(Brazil) Rafael Matos	(Colombia) Alejandro Gómez (United States) Michael Zhu	7–6^{(7–2)}, 6–3
Win	13–3	Apr 2019	M15 Reus, Spain	WTT	Clay	(Brazil) Rafael Matos	(Portugal) Francisco Cabral (Portugal) Luís Faria	6–3, 4–6, [10–6]
Win	14–3	Apr 2019	M15 Tabarka, Tunisia	WTT	Clay	(Brazil) Rafael Matos	(Italy) Erik Crepaldi (Serbia) Darko Jandrić	6–4, 7–5
Win	15–3	May 2019	M15 Tabarka, Tunisia	WTT	Clay	(Brazil) Rafael Matos	(Argentina) Franco Agamenone (Argentina) Franco Emanuel Egea	6–4, 6–4
Loss	15–4	May 2019	M15 Valldoreix, Spain	WTT	Clay	(Brazil) Rafael Matos	(Brazil) Felipe Meligeni Alves (Spain) Jaume Pla Malfeito	6–1, 4–6, [9–11]
Loss	15–5	Jul 2019	M25 Troyes, France	WTT	Clay	(France) Dan Added	(France) Joffrey De Schepper (France) Pierre Faivre	6–2, 4–6, [5–10]
Win	16–5	Aug 2019	M25 Santander, Spain	WTT	Clay	(Brazil) Rafael Matos	(Russia) Ivan Gakhov (Spain) Jaume Pla Malfeito	7–5, 6–4
Win	17–5	Sep 2019	M25 Seville, Spain	WTT	Clay	(Brazil) Rafael Matos	(Spain) Sergio Gutiérrez Ferrol (Spain) Sergi Perez Conti	6–1, 6–3
Win	18–5	May 2021	M15 Antalya, Turkey	WTT	Clay	(Brazil) Gabriel Roveri Sidney	(Switzerland) Sandro Ehrat (Austria) Alexander Erler	6–2, 7–6^{(7–2)}
Loss	18–6	May 2021	M15 Antalya, Turkey	WTT	Clay	(Brazil) Gabriel Roveri Sidney	(Argentina) Ignacio Monzón (Argentina) Fermín Tenti	4–6, 3–6
Win	19–6	May 2021	M15 Antalya, Turkey	WTT	Clay	(Brazil) Gabriel Roveri Sidney	(Italy) Daniele Capecchi (Italy) Davide Galopinni	6–7^{(0–7)}, 7–5, [10–4]
Win	20–6	May 2021	M15 Antalya, Turkey	WTT	Clay	(Uruguay) Ignacio Carou	(Italy) Daniele Capecchi (Italy) Andrea Basso	7–5, 1–6, [10–7]
Win	21–6	Jul 2021	M25 Wrocław, Poland	WTT	Clay	(Brazil) Oscar Jose Gutierrez	(Italy) Marco Bortolotti (Colombia) Cristian Rodríguez	7–6^{(8–6)}, 2–6, [11–9]
Win	22–6	Jul 2022	M25 Den Haag, Netherlands	WTT	Clay	(Brazil) Marcelo Zormann	(Australia) James Frawley (Australia) Akira Santillan	7–6^{(7–5)}, 2–6, [11–9]
Win	23–6	Oct 2022	M25 Rio de Janeiro, Brazil	WTT	Clay	(Brazil) Marcelo Zormann	(Brazil) Wilson Leite (Brazil) José Pereira	6–4, 6–2
Win	24–6	Nov 2022	M25 Lajeado, Brazil	WTT	Clay	(Brazil) Marcelo Zormann	(Brazil) João Victor Couto Loureiro (Brazil) Gustavo Heide	6–3, 6–2

== Significant Junior results ==
=== Junior Grand Slam tournaments ===
==== Doubles: 2 (1 title, 1 runner-up) ====
Result	Year	Tournament	Surface	Partner	Opponents	Score
Win	2014	Wimbledon	Grass	(Brazil) Marcelo Zormann	(United States) Stefan Kozlov (Russia) Andrey Rublev	6–4, 3–6, 8–6
Loss	2016	French Open	Clay	(South Korea) Chung Yun-seong	(Israel) Yshai Oliel (Czech Republic) Patrik Rikl	3–6, 4–6

=== Youth Olympics ===
==== Singles: 1 (silver medal) ====
Result	Year	Tournament	Surface	Opponent	Score
Silver	2014	Nanjing Youth Olympics	Hard	(Poland) Kamil Majchrzak	4–6, 5–7

==== Doubles: 1 (gold medal) ====
Result	Year	Tournament	Surface	Partner	Opponents	Score
Gold	2014	Nanjing Youth Olympics	Hard	(Brazil) Marcelo Zormann	(Russia) Karen Khachanov (Russia) Andrey Rublev	7–5, 3–6, [10–3]
