= Andrea Collarini =

Argentine-American tennis player (born 1992)

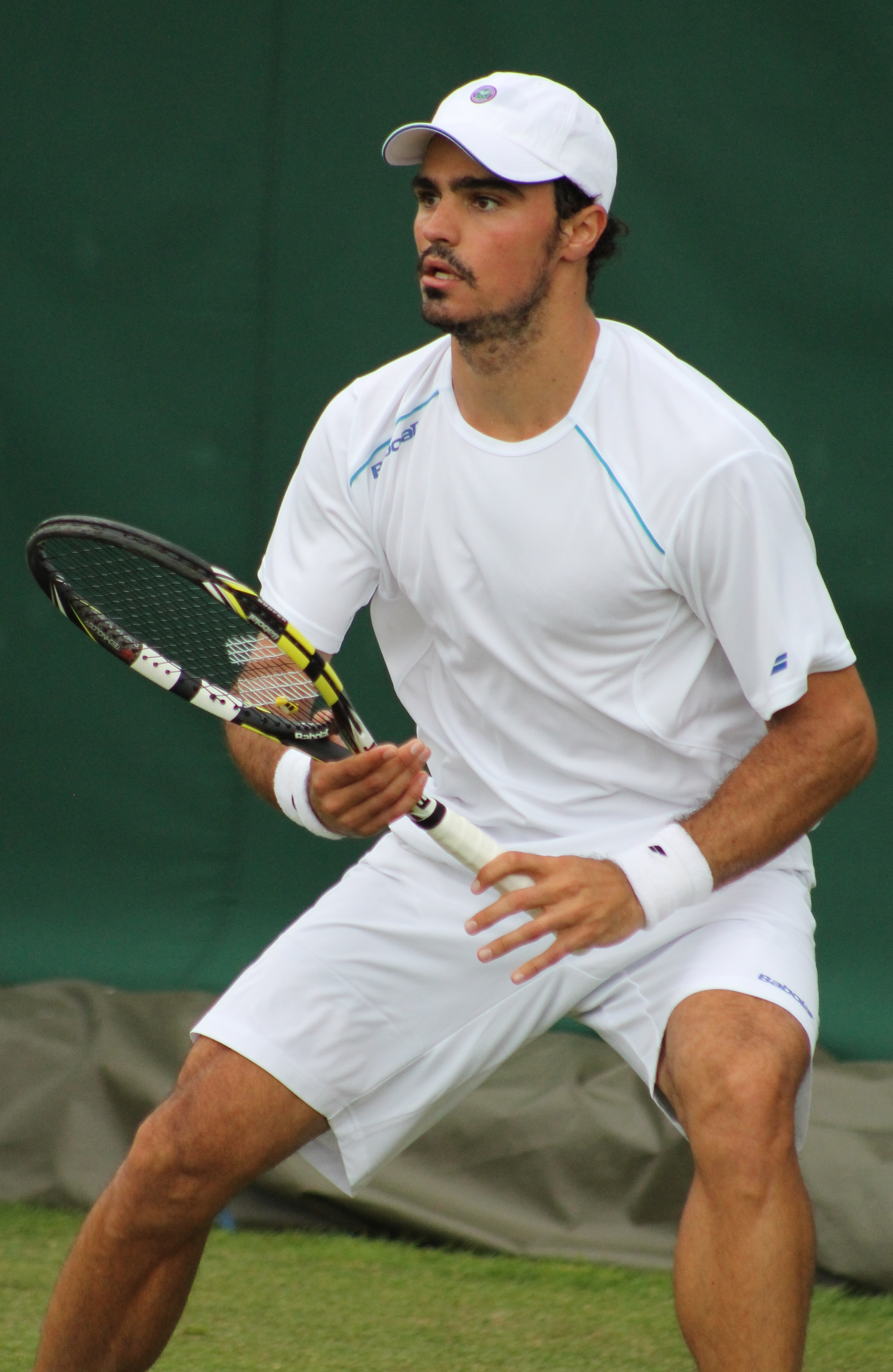
- Collarini at the 2014 Wimbledon Championships
- Country (sports): Argentina (2007–2010; 2012–present); United States (2010–2012)
- Born: January 31, 1992 (age 34) New York City, United States
- Height: 6 ft 1 in (1.85 m)
- Turned pro: 2010
- Plays: Left-handed (two-handed backhand)
- Coach: Juan Martin Aranguren
- Prize money: US $1,046,117

Singles
- Career record: 0–2
- Career titles: 0
- Highest ranking: No. 177 (24 April 2023)
- Current ranking: No. 340 (13 July 2026)

Grand Slam singles results
- Australian Open: Q3 (2018)
- French Open: Q3 (2025)
- Wimbledon: Q2 (2018)
- US Open: Q2 (2022, 2025)

Doubles
- Career record: 4–5
- Career titles: 0
- Highest ranking: No. 193 (1 August 2022)
- Current ranking: No. 300 (13 July 2026)
- Last updated on: 15 July 2026.

Andrea Collarini (Spanish pronunciation: [anˈdɾea kolaˈɾini]; born 31 January 1992) is an American-born Argentine professional tennis player. He has a career-high ATP singles ranking of No. 177 achieved on 24 April 2023 and a doubles ranking of No. 193 reached on 1 August 2022. He plays mostly on the ATP Challenger Tour, where he has won four titles in singles and three in doubles.

Collarini had represented Argentina in the early days of his career from 2007 to 2010, until he chose to represent United States from 2010 to 2012 before switching back to represent Argentina.

== Career ==
On the junior circuit, Collarini had a career high ITF junior ranking of world No. 5 achieved in 2009. In 2010, he reached the final of the French Open boys' singles event, finishing runner-up to Agustín Velotti.

He won his first ATP Challenger title at the 2015 Blu-Express.com Tennis Cup in the doubles event partnering Andrés Molteni.

Collarini made his ATP debut at the 2021 Croatia Open Umag as a qualifier but lost to wildcard Duje Ajduković.

Ranked No. 267, he qualified for the 2024 Generali Open Kitzbühel, his second ATP main draw but lost to wildcard Nicolas Moreno de Alboran.

== Grand Slam Performance timeline ==
Key
W	F	SF	QF	#R	RR	Q#	DNQ	A	NH

(W) winner; (F) finalist; (SF) semifinalist; (QF) quarterfinalist; (#R) rounds 4, 3, 2, 1; (RR) round-robin stage; (Q#) qualification round; (DNQ) did not qualify; (A) absent; (NH) not held; (SR) strike rate (events won / competed); (W–L) win–loss record.
To avoid confusion and double counting, these charts are updated at the conclusion of a tournament or when the player's participation has ended.

=== Singles ===
Tournament	2010	…	2014	…	2017	2018	2019	2020	2021	2022	2023	2024	2025	W–L
Grand Slam tournaments
Australian Open	A		A		A	Q3	A	Q1	Q1	Q1		Q1	Q1	0–0
French Open	A		Q1		A	Q2	A	Q1	Q1	A	Q2		Q3	0–0
Wimbledon	A		Q1		A	Q2	A	NH	Q1	Q1	Q1		Q1	0–0
US Open	Q1		Q1		Q1	A	A	A	Q1	Q2	Q1			0–0
Win–loss	0–0		0–0		0–0	0–0	0–0	0–0	0–0	0–0				0–0

== ATP Tour finals ==
=== Doubles: 1 (runner-up) ===
Legend Grand Slam (–) ATP 1000 (–) ATP 500 (–) ATP 250 (0–1)	Finals by surface Hard (–) Clay (0–1) Grass (–)	Finals by setting Outdoor (0–1) Indoor (–)

Result	W–L	Date	Tournament	Tier	Surface	Partner	Opponents	Score
Loss	0–1	Feb 2026	Argentina Open, Argentina	ATP 250	Clay	(Argentina) Nicolás Kicker	(Brazil) Orlando Luz (Brazil) Rafael Matos	5–7, 3–6

== ATP Challenger Tour finals ==
=== Singles: 9 (4 titles, 5 runner-ups) ===
Legend ATP Challenger Tour (4–5)	Finals by surface Hard (–) Clay (4–5)

Result	W–L	Date	Tournament	Tier	Surface	Opponent	Score
Loss	0–1	Mar 2014	Salinas Challenger, Ecuador	Challenger	Clay	(Dominican Republic) Víctor Estrella Burgos	3–6, 4–6
Win	1–1	Aug 2019	Internazionali Città dell'Aquila, Italy	Challenger	Clay	(Slovakia) Andrej Martin	6–3, 6–1
Loss	1–2	Apr 2022	Challenger de Tigre II, Argentina	Challenger	Clay	(Argentina) Camilo Ugo Carabelli	5–7, 2–6
Loss	1–3	May 2022	Internazionali Città di Vicenza, Italy	Challenger	Clay	(Italy) Andrea Pellegrino	1–6, 4–6
Win	2–3	Jan 2023	Brasil Tennis Challenger, Brazil	Challenger	Clay	(Chile) Tomás Barrios Vera	6–2, 7–6^{(7–1)}
Win	3–3	Apr 2024	Challenger de Tucumán, Argentina	Challenger	Clay	(Argentina) Hernán Casanova	6–4, 7–6^{(7–3)}
Win	4–3	Jun 2024	Santa Fe Challenger, Argentina	Challenger	Clay	(Argentina) Facundo Mena	6–2, 6–3
Loss	4–4	Nov 2025	Engie Open Florianópolis, Brazil	Challenger	Clay	(Brazil) Gustavo Heide	2–6, 3–6
Loss	4–5	Jan 2026	Challenger AAT, Argentina	Challenger	Clay	(Italy) Franco Agamenone	6–3, 4–6, 2–6

=== Doubles: 5 (3 titles, 2 runner-ups) ===
Legend ATP Challenger Tour (3–2)	Finals by surface Hard (–) Clay (3–2)

Result	W–L	Date	Tournament	Tier	Surface	Partner	Opponents	Score
Loss	0–1	Mar 2015	Cachantún Cup, Chile	Challenger	Clay	(Argentina) Máximo González	(Argentina) Andrés Molteni (Argentina) Guido Pella	6–7^{(7–9)}, 6–3, [4–10]
Win	1–1	Jun 2015	Blu-Express Perugia Cup, Italy	Challenger	Clay	(Argentina) Andrés Molteni	(United States) James Cerretani (Romania) Costin Pavăl	6–3, 7–5
Win	2–1	Mar 2022	Challenger Concepción, Chile	Challenger	Clay	(Argentina) Renzo Olivo	(Ecuador) Diego Hidalgo (Colombia) Cristian Rodríguez	6–4, 6–4
Loss	2–2	Jan 2023	Brasil Tennis Challenger, Brazil	Challenger	Clay	(Argentina) Renzo Olivo	(Brazil) Orlando Luz (Brazil) Marcelo Zormann	walkover
Win	3–2	Mar 2024	Santa Cruz Challenger, Bolivia	Challenger	Clay	(Argentina) Renzo Olivo	(Bolivia) Hugo Dellien (Bolivia) Murkel Dellien	6–4, 6–1

== ITF Tour finals ==
=== Singles: 28 (16 titles, 12 runner-ups) ===
Legend ITF Futures/WTT (16–12)	Finals by surface Hard (–) Clay (16–12)

Result	W–L	Date	Tournament	Tier	Surface	Opponent	Score
Loss	0–1	Oct 2009	Argentina F20, Rosario	Futures	Clay	(Argentina) Pablo Galdón	6–7^{(1–7)}, 7–6^{(7–5)}, 5–7
Win	1–1	Aug 2011	Argentina F10, Buenos Aires	Futures	Clay	(Argentina) Patricio Heras	6–4, 6–3
Win	2–1	Sep 2011	Argentina F15, Dolores	Futures	Clay	(Argentina) Gastón Grimolizzi	6–4, 6–2
Loss	2–2	Oct 2011	Argentina F18, San Juan	Futures	Clay	(Argentina) Pablo Galdón	1–6, 3–6
Loss	2–3	Apr 2012	Argentina F6, Villa María	Futures	Clay	(Argentina) Pablo Galdón	4–6, 3–6
Win	3–3	Jun 2012	Argentina F12, Posadas	Futures	Clay	(Argentina) Andrés Molteni	4–6, 6–2, 6–3
Loss	3–4	Aug 2012	Argentina F20, Buenos Aires	Futures	Clay	(Argentina) Diego Schwartzman	6–7^{(1–7)}, 3–6
Loss	3–5	Dec 2012	Argentina F27, Buenos Aires	Futures	Clay	(Argentina) Patricio Heras	6–3, 6–7^{(8–10)}, 4–6
Loss	3–6	May 2013	Argentina F7, Bell Ville	Futures	Clay	(Argentina) Pablo Galdón	6–7^{(3–7)}, 4–6
Win	4–6	Jun 2013	Argentina F9, Córdoba	Futures	Clay	(Argentina) Patricio Heras	6–1, 6–4
Win	5–6	Jul 2013	Argentina F11, Corrientes	Futures	Clay	(Argentina) Facundo Mena	6–1, 6–4
Win	6–6	Jul 2013	Argentina F13, Misiones	Futures	Clay	(Argentina) Patricio Heras	6–4, 4–6, 7–5
Win	7–6	Dec 2013	Brazil F19, Porto Alegre	Futures	Clay	(Brazil) Fernando Romboli	7–6^{(7–2)}, 6–1
Win	8–6	Feb 2014	Argentina F1, Villa Carlos Paz	Futures	Clay	(Chile) Nicolás Jarry	3–6, 6–0, 6–2
Win	9–6	Jul 2015	Italy F18, Modena	Futures	Clay	(Argentina) Francisco Bahamonde	6–2, 6–1
Loss	9–7	Nov 2015	Peru F5, Lima	Futures	Clay	(Chile) Bastián Malla	4–6, 6–2, 3–6
Win	10–7	Feb 2016	US F8, Plantation	Futures	Clay	(United States) Noah Rubin	6–3, 7–6^{(7–3)}
Loss	10–8	May 2016	Argentina F7, Córdoba	Futures	Clay	(Argentina) Hernán Casanova	6–4, 4–6, 4–6
Win	11–8	Feb 2017	US F8, Indian Harbour Beach	Futures	Clay	(France) Corentin Denolly	7–5, 7–6^{(8–6)}
Loss	11–9	Apr 2017	Italy F7, Santa Margherita di Pula	Futures	Clay	(Italy) Salvatore Caruso	5–7, 3–6
Loss	11–10	Apr 2017	Italy F8, Santa Margherita di Pula	Futures	Clay	(Germany) Yannick Maden	6–2, 1–6, 3–6
Win	12–10	May 2017	Italy F13, Vigevano	Futures	Clay	(France) Gianni Mina	6–4, 6–1
Win	13–10	Jun 2017	Italy F16, Padova	Futures	Clay	(Brazil) Orlando Luz	6–4, 6–4
Win	14–10	Jun 2017	Italy F17, Bergamo	Futures	Clay	(Croatia) Viktor Galović	6–2, 6–4
Win	15–10	Jul 2017	Italy F20, Albinea	Futures	Clay	(Italy) Filippo Leonardi	6–3, 6–3
Loss	15–11	Jul 2017	Italy F21, Casinalbo	Futures	Clay	(Italy) Gianluca Mager	6–4, 6–7^{(0–7)}, 2–6
Loss	15–12	Apr 2018	Italy F8, Santa Margherita di Pula	Futures	Clay	(Argentina) Hernán Casanova	6–7^{(5–7)}, 2–6
Win	16–12	Sep 2024	M15 Córdoba, Argentina	WTT	Clay	(Argentina) Mariano Kestelboim	6–2, 7–5

=== Doubles: 18 (10 titles, 8 runner-ups) ===
Legend ITF Futures/WTT (10–8)	Finals by surface Hard (0–1) Clay (10–7)

Result	W–L	Date	Tournament	Tier	Surface	Partner	Opponents	Score
Win	1–0	May 2010	US F11, Orange Park	Futures	Clay	(United States) Denis Kudla	(United States) Mitchell Frank (United Kingdom) Junior Alexander Ore	7–6^{(8–6)}, 6–3
Loss	1–1	Oct 2010	US F27, Mansfield	Futures	Hard	(United States) Denis Kudla	(Bulgaria) Dimitar Kutrovsky (United States) Joshua Zavala	3–6, 3–6
Loss	1–2	Nov 2010	US F29, Niceville	Futures	Clay	(United States) Denis Kudla	(United States) Robbye Poole (Norway) Erling Tveit	6–7^{(4–7)}, 2–6
Win	2–2	Jul 2011	Brazil F22, Jundiaí	Futures	Clay	(Brazil) Diego Matos	(Brazil) Tiago Lopes (Brazil) Victor Maynard	6–3, 6–4
Loss	2–3	Sep 2011	Argentina F16, Santiago del Estero	Futures	Clay	(Argentina) Juan-Pablo Amado	(Argentina) Alejandro Fabbri (Argentina) Jonathan Gonzalia	6–7^{(4–7)}, 4–6
Win	3–3	Oct 2011	Argentina F21, Rosario	Futures	Clay	(Argentina) Renzo Olivo	(Italy) Giammarco Micolani (Italy) Giorgio Portaluri	4–6, 6–4, [11–9]
Loss	3–4	Mar 2012	Argentina F2, Dolores	Futures	Clay	(Argentina) Nicolás Pastor	(Argentina) Tomás Lipovšek Puches (Argentina) Juan Pablo Ortiz	6–1, 4–6, [8–10]
Win	4–4	May 2012	Brazil F10, Manaus	Futures	Clay	(Brazil) Guilherme Clezar	(Brazil) Fabrício Neis (Brazil) José Pereira	7–6^{(9–7)}, 3–6, [10–5]
Win	5–4	May 2013	Argentina F7, Bell Ville	Futures	Clay	(Argentina) Guillermo Durán	(Peru) Duilio Beretta (Peru) Sergio Galdós	6–3, 6–4
Loss	5–5	Jun 2013	Argentina F9, Córdoba	Futures	Clay	(Argentina) Mateo Nicolás Martínez	(Brazil) Daniel Dutra da Silva (Brazil) Pedro Sakamoto	3–6, 6–7^{(4–7)}
Win	6–5	Jul 2013	Argentina F12, Resistencia	Futures	Clay	(Argentina) Mateo Nicolás Martínez	(Argentina) Mauricio Pérez Mota (Argentina) Gabriel Alejandro Hidalgo	7–6^{(7–2)}, 6–7^{(2–7)}, [10–4]
Win	7–5	Jul 2015	Italy F18, Modena	Futures	Clay	(Argentina) Tomás Lipovšek Puches	(Italy) Alessandro Luisi (Italy) Andrea Vavassori	7–5, 5–7, [10–7]
Win	8–5	Aug 2015	Argentina F8, Buenos Aires	Futures	Clay	(Argentina) Juan Ignacio Galarza	(Brazil) Óscar José Gutierrez (Argentina) Gabriel Alejandro Hidalgo	walkover
Loss	8–6	Nov 2015	Peru F5, Lima	Futures	Clay	(Argentina) Juan Ignacio Galarza	(Ecuador) Iván Endara (Peru) Jorge Panta	walkover
Win	9–6	Dec 2015	Peru F6, Trujillo	Futures	Clay	(Peru) Duilio Beretta	(Spain) Jaume Pla Malfeito (Peru) Alexander Merino	6–4, 6–3
Loss	9–7	Apr 2017	Italy F6, Santa Margherita di Pula	Futures	Clay	(Argentina) Juan Pablo Paz	(Poland) Mateusz Kowalczyk (Poland) Grzegorz Panfil	1–6, 6–7^{(5–7)}
Loss	9–8	Apr 2017	Italy F8, Santa Margherita di Pula	Futures	Clay	(United States) Rhyne Williams	(Switzerland) Adrian Bodmer (Germany) Jakob Sude	6–7^{(5–7)}, 6–4, [1–10]
Win	10–8	May 2017	Italy F13, Vigevano	Futures	Clay	(Argentina) Franco Agamenone	(Austria) Sebastian Bader (United States) Hunter Reese	6–4, 6–3

== Junior Grand Slam finals ==
=== Singles: 1 (runner-up) ===
Result	Year	Tournament	Surface	Opponent	Score
Loss	2010	French Open	Clay	(Argentina) Agustín Velotti	4–6, 5–7

== Controversies ==
=== Spray incident at the Challenger de Santiago ===
In March 2026, during a Challenger tournament in Santiago, Chile, Collarini was involved in a viral incident after being seen spraying an aerosol on a tennis ball before serving. The moment, captured on video, quickly spread across social media and generated speculation among fans and commentators regarding a potential breach of tennis regulations.

The episode sparked debate on online platforms such as Reddit, where users questioned whether altering a ball could constitute a violation of the rules. According to tennis regulations, deliberately modifying a ball's condition—such as its weight or surface—is prohibited and could lead to penalties if done during official competition.

It was later confirmed that the incident was an advertising stunt. According to Infobae, the scene was part of a launch campaign for Dove Men+Care All Body Deo.

The incident is noted as an example of how ambiguous actions in sports can generate widespread discussion and viral attention.
