= 2026 Engie Open Florianópolis – Singles =

Singles
- 2026 Engie Open Florianópolis
- 2025 Champion: (Brazil) Gustavo Heide

Events
Singles	Doubles
- Engie Open Florianópolis

Gustavo Heide was the defending champion but chose not to defend his title.

== Seeds ==
1. (Spain) Max Alcalá Gurri
2. (Denmark) Elmer Møller
3. (Argentina) Guido Iván Justo
4. (Argentina) Juan Manuel La Serna
5. (Brazil) Matheus Pucinelli de Almeida
6. (Uruguay) Franco Roncadelli
7. (Argentina) Genaro Alberto Olivieri
8. (Brazil) Igor Marcondes

== Draw ==
Key

- Q = Qualifier
- WC = Wild card
- LL = Lucky loser
- Alt = Alternate
- ITF = ITF entry
- PR = Protected ranking
- SR = Special ranking
- SE = Special exempt
- JE = Junior exempt
- JR = Junior Accelerator Programme entrant
- CO = College Accelerator Programme entrant
- NG = Next Gen Accelerator Program entrant
- w/o = Walkover
- r = Retired
- d = Defaulted

=== Finals ===
Semifinals

Final

=== Top half ===
First round
1	(Spain) M Alcalá Gurri
(Argentina) G Villanueva
Andrey Chepelev
(Brazil) E Ribeiro
(Netherlands) Ryan Nijboer
WC	(Brazil) Bruno Fernandez
Alt	(Brazil) D Dutra da Silva
6	(Uruguay) F Roncadelli
4	(Argentina) JM La Serna
Q
(Brazil) PA Saraiva dos Santos
Q
(Argentina) Lucio Ratti
(Uruguay) J Aguilar Cardozo
(Ecuador) Á Guillén Meza
7	(Argentina) GA Olivieri

Second round

Quarterfinals

Semifinals

=== Bottom half ===
First round
8	(Brazil) I Marcondes
Q
(Switzerland) J Nikles
(Brazil) P Boscardin Dias
Q
Q
WC	(Brazil) P Sakamoto
3	(Argentina) GI Justo
5	(Brazil) M Pucinelli de Almeida
(Argentina) Carlos María Zárate
(Argentina) JB Torres
(Brazil) F Meligeni Alves
Q
WC	(Brazil) Leonardo Storck França
(Argentina) N Kicker
2	(Denmark) E Møller

Second round
Q

Quarterfinals

Semifinals
