= 2024 Engie Open Florianópolis – Men's singles =

Men's singles
- 2024 Engie Open Florianópolis

Final
- Champion: (France) Enzo Couacaud
- Runner-up: (Brazil) João Lucas Reis da Silva
- Score: 3–6, 6–4, 7–6^{(7–1)}

Events
Singles	men	women
Doubles	men	women
← 2023 ·	Engie Open Florianópolis	· 2025 →

Tomás Barrios Vera was the defending champion but chose not to defend his title.

Enzo Couacaud won the title after defeating João Lucas Reis da Silva 3–6, 6–4, 7–6^{(7–1)} in the final.

== Seeds ==
1. (Brazil) Thiago Monteiro (second round)
2. (Argentina) Francisco Comesaña (first round)
3. (Brazil) Felipe Meligeni Alves (withdrew)
4. (Argentina) Román Andrés Burruchaga (quarterfinals)
5. (Argentina) Genaro Alberto Olivieri (second round)
6. (France) Geoffrey Blancaneaux (second round)
7. (France) Enzo Couacaud (champion)
8. (Canada) Liam Draxl (first round)

== Draw ==
Key

- Q = Qualifier
- WC = Wild card
- LL = Lucky loser
- Alt = Alternate
- ITF = ITF entry
- PR = Protected ranking
- SR = Special ranking
- SE = Special exempt
- JE = Junior exempt
- JR = Junior Accelerator Programme entrant
- CO = College Accelerator Programme entrant
- NG = Next Gen Accelerator Program entrant
- w/o = Walkover
- r = Retired
- d = Defaulted

=== Finals ===
Semifinals
Q	(Argentina) Camilo Ugo Carabelli	4	3
(Brazil) João Lucas Reis da Silva	6	6
7	(France) Enzo Couacaud	6	6
(Italy) Gianluca Mager	2	4

Final
(Brazil) João Lucas Reis da Silva	6	4	6^{1}
7	(France) Enzo Couacaud	3	6	7^{7}

=== Top half ===
First round
1	(Brazil) T Monteiro	6	6
B Bobrov	2	4
(Spain) C Sánchez Jover	5	1
(Brazil) O Luz	7	6
Q	(Argentina) C Ugo Carabelli	6	6^{6}	6
WC	(Brazil) Nicolas Zanellato	1	7^{8}	0
Q	(Brazil) PA Saraiva dos Santos	6	6^{4}	3
6	(France) G Blancaneaux	4	7^{7}	6
LL	(Brazil) D Dutra da Silva	4	7^{7}	6
Alt	(Argentina) G Villanueva	6	6^{5}	2
(Brazil) P Sakamoto	5	5
(Brazil) JL Reis da Silva	7	7
Alt	(Brazil) E Ribeiro	6^{2}	2
LL	(Bolivia) JC Prado Ángelo	7^{7}	6
(Italy) Alexander Weis	4	6	4
5	(Argentina) GA Olivieri	6	4	6

Second round
1	(Brazil) T Monteiro	3	6^{5}
(Brazil) O Luz	6	7^{7}
Q	(Argentina) C Ugo Carabelli	7	6
6	(France) G Blancaneaux	5	1
LL	(Brazil) D Dutra da Silva	6	3	4
(Brazil) JL Reis da Silva	1	6	6
LL	(Bolivia) JC Prado Ángelo	1	6	7^{7}
5	(Argentina) GA Olivieri	6	4	6^{5}

Quarterfinals
(Brazil) O Luz	6	5	4
Q	(Argentina) C Ugo Carabelli	1	7	6
(Brazil) JL Reis da Silva	6	6
LL	(Bolivia) JC Prado Ángelo	2	1

Semifinals
Q	(Argentina) C Ugo Carabelli	4	3
(Brazil) JL Reis da Silva	6	6

=== Bottom half ===
First round
7	(France) E Couacaud	6	6
WC	(Brazil) Gustavo Ribeiro de Almeida	4	2
Q	(Brazil) Gabriel Roveri Sidney	4	2
Q	(Argentina) Lorenzo Joaquín Rodríguez	6	6
(Argentina) JB Torres	4	6	3
(Argentina) R Olivo	6	2	6
SE	(Paraguay) AD Vallejo	3	4
4	(Argentina) RA Burruchaga	6	6
8	(Canada) L Draxl	4	1
(Brazil) M Pucinelli de Almeida	6	6
(Peru) G Bueno	3	2
(Italy) G Mager	6	6
WC	(Brazil) P Boscardin Dias	0	3
Q	(Israel) D Cukierman	6	6
Q	(Brazil) M Barreiros Reyes	6	6
2	(Argentina) F Comesaña	4	3

Second round
7	(France) E Couacaud	7	6
Q	(Argentina) LJ Rodríguez	5	3
(Argentina) R Olivo	5	2
4	(Argentina) RA Burruchaga	7	6
(Brazil) M Pucinelli de Almeida	6	1^{r}
(Italy) G Mager	4	5
Q	(Israel) D Cukierman	6	4	6
Q	(Brazil) M Barreiros Reyes	2	6	2

Quarterfinals
7	(France) E Couacaud	6	6
4	(Argentina) RA Burruchaga	2	1
(Italy) G Mager	7^{7}	6
Q	(Israel) D Cukierman	6^{2}	1

Semifinals
7	(France) E Couacaud	6	6
(Italy) G Mager	2	4
