= 2026 Engie Open Florianópolis =

- Date: 23–29 November
- Edition: 5th
- Category: ATP Challenger Tour
- Surface: Clay / Outdoor
- Location: Florianópolis, Brazil

2025 Champions

Singles
- (Brazil) Gustavo Heide

Doubles
- (Bolivia) Boris Arias / (Denmark) Johannes Ingildsen
- Engie Open Florianópolis

The 2026 ENGIE Open Florianópolis was a professional tennis tournament played on outdoor clay courts. It was the fifth edition of the tournament, which was part of the 2026 ATP Challenger Tour. It took place in Florianópolis, Brazil between 23 and 29 November 2026.

== Champions ==
=== Singles ===
- vs.

=== Doubles ===
- / vs. /

== Singles main-draw entrants ==
=== Seeds ===
Country	Player	Rank^{1}	Seed
ESP	Max Alcalá Gurri	130	1
DEN	Elmer Møller	149	2
ARG	Guido Iván Justo	182	3
ARG	Juan Manuel La Serna	217	4
BRA	Matheus Pucinelli de Almeida	219	5
URU	Franco Roncadelli	222	6
ARG	Genaro Alberto Olivieri	240	7
BRA	Igor Marcondes	292	8

- ^{1} Rankings are as of 16 November 2026.

=== Other entrants ===
The following players received wildcards into the singles main draw:

- (Brazil) Bruno Fernandez
- (Brazil) Pedro Sakamoto
- (Brazil) Leonardo Storck França

The following player received entry into the singles main draw as an alternate:

- (Brazil) Daniel Dutra da Silva

The following players received entry from the qualifying draw:
