= 2023 Florianópolis Challenger – Doubles =

Doubles
- 2023 Florianópolis Challenger

Final
- Champions: (Brazil) Pedro Boscardin Dias (Brazil) Gustavo Heide
- Runners-up: (Brazil) Christian Oliveira (Brazil) Pedro Sakamoto
- Score: 6–2, 7–5

Events
Singles	Doubles
← 2021 ·	Florianópolis Challenger	· 2024 →

Nicolás Barrientos and Alejandro Gómez were the defending champions but chose not to defend their title.

Pedro Boscardin Dias and Gustavo Heide won the title after defeating Christian Oliveira and Pedro Sakamoto 6–2, 7–5 in the final.

== Seeds ==
1. (Brazil) Orlando Luz / (Brazil) Marcelo Zormann (first round)
2. (Peru) Arklon Huertas del Pino / (Peru) Conner Huertas del Pino (quarterfinals)
3. (Argentina) Valerio Aboian / (Uruguay) Ignacio Carou (first round)
4. (Brazil) Daniel Dutra da Silva / (Lebanon) Benjamin Hassan (first round)

== Draw ==
=== Key ===
- Q = Qualifier
- WC = Wild card
- LL = Lucky loser
- Alt = Alternate
- SE = Special exempt
- PR = Protected ranking
- ITF = ITF entry
- JE = Junior exempt
- w/o = Walkover
- r = Retired
- d = Defaulted
- SR = Special ranking

First round
1	(Brazil) O Luz (Brazil) M Zormann	6^{0}	7^{7}	[5]
(Brazil) Igor Gimenez (Brazil) Fernando Yamacita	7^{7}	6^{4}	[10]
WC	(Brazil) Gustavo Ribeiro de Almeida (Brazil) Pedro Rodrigues	4	3
WC	(Brazil) Christian Oliveira (Brazil) P Sakamoto	6	6
3	(Argentina) V Aboian (Uruguay) I Carou	6	3	[7]
(Peru) J Panta (Argentina) Matías Zukas	3	6	[10]
(Argentina) A Collarini (Italy) A Giannessi	6	6
(Brazil) Wilson Leite (Brazil) J Pereira	4	2
(Brazil) Gabriel Roveri Sidney (Argentina) G Villanueva	5	7^{7}	[7]
(Brazil) P Boscardin Dias (Brazil) G Heide	7	6^{5}	[10]
(Italy) Facundo Juárez (Argentina) Juan Bautista Otegui	1	6	[10]
4	(Brazil) D Dutra da Silva (Lebanon) B Hassan	6	3	[4]
(Chile) G Lama (Argentina) T Lipovšek Puches	2	3
(Brazil) J Fonseca (Brazil) T Seyboth Wild	6	6
Alt	(Argentina) Thiago Cigarrán (Bolivia) JC Prado Ángelo	2	4
2	(Peru) A Huertas del Pino (Peru) C Huertas del Pino	6	6

Quarterfinals
(Brazil) I Gimenez (Brazil) F Yamacita	6^{6}	7	[7]
WC	(Brazil) C Oliveira (Brazil) P Sakamoto	7^{8}	5	[10]
(Peru) J Panta (Argentina) M Zukas	6	6
(Argentina) A Collarini (Italy) A Giannessi	2	1
(Brazil) P Boscardin Dias (Brazil) G Heide	6	6
(Italy) F Juárez (Argentina) JB Otegui	2	2
(Brazil) J Fonseca (Brazil) T Seyboth Wild	3	6	[10]
2	(Peru) A Huertas del Pino (Peru) C Huertas del Pino	6	4	[7]

Semifinals
WC	(Brazil) C Oliveira (Brazil) P Sakamoto	6	6
(Peru) J Panta (Argentina) M Zukas	4	3
(Brazil) P Boscardin Dias (Brazil) G Heide	6	1	[10]
(Brazil) J Fonseca (Brazil) T Seyboth Wild	2	6	[7]

Final
WC	(Brazil) C Oliveira (Brazil) P Sakamoto	2	5
(Brazil) P Boscardin Dias (Brazil) G Heide	6	7
