= 2021 Florianópolis Challenger – Singles =

Singles
- 2021 Florianópolis Challenger

Final
- Champion: (Brazil) Igor Marcondes
- Runner-up: (Bolivia) Hugo Dellien
- Score: 6–2, 6–4

Events
Singles	Doubles
Florianópolis Challenger	· 2023 →

This was the first edition of the tournament.

Igor Marcondes won the title after defeating Hugo Dellien 6–2, 6–4 in the final.

== Seeds ==
1. (Uruguay) Pablo Cuevas (quarterfinals, retired)
2. (Bolivia) Hugo Dellien (final)
3. (Brazil) Thiago Seyboth Wild (first round)
4. (Argentina) Juan Ignacio Londero (semifinals)
5. (Argentina) Nicolás Kicker (second round)
6. (Argentina) Pedro Cachin (first round)
7. (Argentina) Andrea Collarini (first round)
8. (Argentina) Juan Pablo Ficovich (first round)

== Draw ==
Key

- Q = Qualifier
- WC = Wild card
- LL = Lucky loser
- Alt = Alternate
- ITF = ITF entry
- PR = Protected ranking
- SR = Special ranking
- SE = Special exempt
- JE = Junior exempt
- JR = Junior Accelerator Programme entrant
- CO = College Accelerator Programme entrant
- NG = Next Gen Accelerator Program entrant
- w/o = Walkover
- r = Retired
- d = Defaulted

=== Finals ===
Semifinals
Q	(Brazil) Igor Marcondes	7^{7}	3	6
4	(Argentina) Juan Ignacio Londero	6^{5}	6	4
(Argentina) Genaro Alberto Olivieri	4	6	3
2	(Bolivia) Hugo Dellien	6	2	6

Final
Q	(Brazil) Igor Marcondes	6	6
2	(Bolivia) Hugo Dellien	2	4

=== Top half ===
First round
1	(Uruguay) P Cuevas	7^{7}	6
(Spain) N Álvarez Varona	6^{3}	2
(Colombia) A González	1	3
Alt	(Argentina) Matías Zukas	6	6
(Brazil) O Luz	6	6^{7}	6
(Dominican Republic) R Cid Subervi	4	7^{9}	3
Q	(Brazil) I Marcondes	6	6
7	(Argentina) A Collarini	3	3
4	(Argentina) JI Londero	7	7
WC	(Brazil) G Heide	5	5
(Brazil) G Clezar	3	7^{7}	2
(Switzerland) J Nikles	6	6^{1}	6
(Brazil) D Dutra da Silva	6	6
Q	(Brazil) Wilson Leite	3	4
Alt	(Italy) L Darderi	5	4
5	(Argentina) N Kicker	7	6

Second round
1	(Uruguay) P Cuevas	6	6^{5}	6
Alt	(Argentina) M Zukas	4	7^{7}	4
(Brazil) O Luz	1	4
Q	(Brazil) I Marcondes	6	6
4	(Argentina) JI Londero	6	6
(Switzerland) J Nikles	1	4
(Brazil) D Dutra da Silva	2	7	6
5	(Argentina) N Kicker	6	5	4

Quarterfinals
1	(Uruguay) P Cuevas	6	1^{r}
Q	(Brazil) I Marcondes	2	4
4	(Argentina) JI Londero	6	6
(Brazil) D Dutra da Silva	4	3

Semifinals
Q	(Brazil) I Marcondes	7^{7}	3	6
4	(Argentina) JI Londero	6^{5}	6	4

=== Bottom half ===
First round
8	(Argentina) JP Ficovich	3	0
Q	(Colombia) N Barrientos	6	6
WC	(Brazil) P Boscardin Dias	6	5	2
Alt	(Argentina) G Villanueva	4	7	6
WC	(Brazil) M Alves	6^{5}	4
(Argentina) GA Olivieri	7^{7}	6
(Brazil) M Pucinelli de Almeida	6	6
3	(Brazil) T Seyboth Wild	4	2
6	(Argentina) P Cachin	5	4
(Argentina) Facundo Juárez	7	6
(Argentina) F Díaz Acosta	6	6
(Japan) K Uchida	4	3
(Serbia) P Krstin	7	1	2
(Argentina) H Casanova	5	6	6
Q	(Bolivia) F Zeballos	6^{0}	2
2	(Bolivia) H Dellien	7^{7}	6

Second round
Q	(Colombia) N Barrientos	7^{7}	6
Alt	(Argentina) G Villanueva	6^{3}	1
(Argentina) GA Olivieri	6	7
(Brazil) M Pucinelli de Almeida	1	5
(Argentina) F Juárez	3	7	6
(Argentina) F Díaz Acosta	6	5	2
(Argentina) H Casanova	0	3
2	(Bolivia) H Dellien	6	6

Quarterfinals
Q	(Colombia) N Barrientos	2	4
(Argentina) GA Olivieri	6	6
(Argentina) F Juárez	6	4	1
2	(Bolivia) H Dellien	4	6	6

Semifinals
(Argentina) GA Olivieri	4	6	3
2	(Bolivia) H Dellien	6	2	6
