= 2026 Engie Open Florianópolis – Doubles =

Doubles
- 2026 Engie Open Florianópolis
- 2025 Champions: (Bolivia) Boris Arias (Denmark) Johannes Ingildsen

Events
Singles	Doubles
- Engie Open Florianópolis

Boris Arias and Johannes Ingildsen were the defending champions but only Arias chose to defend his title, partnering Ignacio Carou.

== Seeds ==
1. (Colombia) Nicolás Barrientos / (Brazil) Eduardo Ribeiro
2. (Bolivia) Federico Zeballos / (Brazil) Marcelo Zormann
3. (Bolivia) Boris Arias / (Uruguay) Ignacio Carou
4. (Peru) Alexander Merino / (Argentina) Franco Ribero

== Draw ==
Key

- Q = Qualifier
- WC = Wild card
- LL = Lucky loser
- Alt = Alternate
- ITF = ITF entry
- PR = Protected ranking
- SR = Special ranking
- SE = Special exempt
- JE = Junior exempt
- JR = Junior Accelerator Programme entrant
- CO = College Accelerator Programme entrant
- NG = Next Gen Accelerator Program entrant
- w/o = Walkover
- r = Retired
- d = Defaulted

First round
1	(Colombia) N Barrientos (Brazil) E Ribeiro
(Brazil) Bruno Oliveira (Brazil) Natan Rodrigues
(Argentina) F Bagnis (Argentina) M Kestelboim
(Uruguay) J Aguilar Cardozo (Argentina) G Villanueva
3	(Bolivia) B Arias (Uruguay) I Carou
(Netherlands) Ryan Nijboer (Argentina) Lucio Ratti
(Argentina) Thiago Cigarrán (Argentina) S de la Fuente
(Brazil) JVC Loureiro (Brazil) I Marcondes
(Brazil) D Dutra da Silva (Peru) C Huertas del Pino
(Brazil) P Sakamoto (Brazil) PA Saraiva dos Santos
(Argentina) GI Justo (Uruguay) F Roncadelli
4	(Peru) A Merino (Argentina) F Ribero
(Switzerland) J Nikles (Argentina) Carlos María Zárate
WC	(Brazil) Bruno Fernandez (Brazil) Daniel Rebelo
WC	(Brazil) Rafael Tosetto (Brazil) Nicolas Zanellato
2	(Bolivia) F Zeballos (Brazil) M Zormann

Quarterfinals
(Brazil)
(Argentina)
(Brazil)
(Argentina)
(Brazil)

Semifinals

Final
