= 2021 Florianópolis Challenger =

- Date: 6–12 December
- Edition: 1st
- Surface: Clay
- Location: Florianópolis, Brazil

Champions

Singles
- (Brazil) Igor Marcondes

Doubles
- (Colombia) Nicolás Barrientos / (Colombia) Alejandro Gómez
Florianópolis Challenger	· 2023 →

The 2021 Florianópolis Challenger was a professional tennis tournament played on clay courts. It was the first edition of the tournament which was part of the 2021 ATP Challenger Tour. It took place in Florianópolis, Brazil from 6 to 12 December 2021.

== Singles main-draw entrants ==
=== Seeds ===
Country	Player	Rank^{1}	Seed
URU	Pablo Cuevas	99	1
BOL	Hugo Dellien	119	2
BRA	Thiago Seyboth Wild	131	3
ARG	Juan Ignacio Londero	139	4
ARG	Nicolás Kicker	229	5
ARG	Pedro Cachin	239	6
ARG	Andrea Collarini	264	7
ARG	Juan Pablo Ficovich	285	8

- ^{1} Rankings are as of 29 November 2021.

=== Other entrants ===
The following players received wildcards into the singles main draw:

- (Brazil) Mateus Alves
- (Brazil) Pedro Boscardin Dias
- (Brazil) Gustavo Heide

The following players received entry into the singles main draw as alternates:

- (Italy) Luciano Darderi
- (Argentina) Gonzalo Villanueva
- (Argentina) Matías Zukas

The following players received entry from the qualifying draw:

- (Colombia) Nicolás Barrientos
- (Brazil) Wilson Leite
- (Brazil) Igor Marcondes
- (Bolivia) Federico Zeballos

== Champions ==
=== Singles ===
- (Brazil) Igor Marcondes def. (Bolivia) Hugo Dellien 6–2, 6–4.

=== Doubles ===
- (Colombia) Nicolás Barrientos / (Colombia) Alejandro Gómez def. (Uruguay) Martín Cuevas / (Brazil) Rafael Matos 6–3, 6–3.
