= 2026 San Diego Challenger – Doubles =

Doubles
- 2026 San Diego Challenger

Final
- Champions: (Netherlands) Stian Klaassen (United States) Christopher Papa
- Runners-up: (United States) Vignesh Gogineni (United States) Noah Zamora
- Score: 7–6^{(8–6)}, 5–7, [10–3]

Events
| Singles | Doubles |
- San Diego Challenger

This was the first edition of the tournament.

Stian Klaassen and Christopher Papa won the title after defeating Vignesh Gogineni and Noah Zamora 7–6^{(8–6)}, 5–7, [10–3] in the final.

== Seeds ==
1. (United States) Mac Kiger / (Australia) John-Patrick Smith (first round)
2. (Argentina) Federico Agustín Gómez / (Venezuela) Luis David Martínez (first round)
3. (United States) Daniel Milavsky / (United States) Braden Shick (quarterfinals)
4. (Brazil) Luís Britto / (Brazil) Igor Marcondes (first round)

== Draw ==
Key

- Q = Qualifier
- WC = Wild card
- LL = Lucky loser
- Alt = Alternate
- ITF = ITF entry
- PR = Protected ranking
- SR = Special ranking
- SE = Special exempt
- JE = Junior exempt
- JR = Junior Accelerator Programme entrant
- CO = College Accelerator Programme entrant
- NG = Next Gen Accelerator Program entrant
- w/o = Walkover
- r = Retired
- d = Defaulted

First round
1 | (United States) M Kiger (Australia) J-P Smith | 1 | 4
(United States) A Martin (United States) A Rybakov | 6 | 6
(Canada) L Draxl (United States) C Smith | 6 | 6
(United Kingdom) J MacKinlay (United Kingdom) Oliver Okonkwo | 3 | 3
4 | (Brazil) L Britto (Brazil) I Marcondes | 3 | 6 | [6]
WC | (United States) Vignesh Gogineni (United States) Noah Zamora | 6 | 2 | [10]
(Japan) S Mitsui (Australia) L Tu | 5 | 4
WC | (United States) William Kleege (Finland) Aleksi Löfman | 7 | 6
(United States) Jack Vance (United States) Jamie Vance | 6 | 2 | [8]
(Netherlands) S Klaassen (United States) C Papa | 4 | 6 | [10]
(United States) T Hilderbrand (United States) A Mayo | 3 | 5
3 | (United States) D Milavsky (United States) B Shick | 6 | 7
(Ecuador) A Andrade (United States) T Zink | 6 | 7
(Mexico) H Hach Verdugo (United States) M Krueger | 3 | 5
(United States) A Ayeni; D Ostapenkov | 6 | 7^{8}
2 | (Argentina) FA Gómez (Venezuela) LD Martínez | 4 | 6^{6}

Quarterfinals
(United States) A Martin (United States) A Rybakov | 7^{8} | 6
(Canada) L Draxl (United States) C Smith | 6^{6} | 3
WC | (United States) V Gogineni (United States) N Zamora | 6 | 6^{3} | [10]
WC | (United States) W Kleege (Finland) A Löfman | 1 | 7^{7} | [7]
(Netherlands) S Klaassen (United States) C Papa | 6 | 7
3 | (United States) D Milavsky (United States) B Shick | 2 | 5
(Ecuador) A Andrade (United States) T Zink | 7^{7} | 3 | [8]
(United States) A Ayeni; D Ostapenkov | 6^{4} | 6 | [10]

Semifinals
(United States) A Martin (United States) A Rybakov | 1 | 4
WC | (United States) V Gogineni (United States) N Zamora | 6 | 6
(Netherlands) S Klaassen (United States) C Papa | 6 | 6
(United States) A Ayeni; D Ostapenkov | 4 | 4

Final
WC | (United States) V Gogineni (United States) N Zamora | 6^{6} | 7 | [3]
(Netherlands) S Klaassen (United States) C Papa | 7^{8} | 5 | [10]
