= 2024 Engie Open Florianópolis – Men's doubles =

Men's doubles
- 2024 Engie Open Florianópolis

Final
- Champions: (Israel) Daniel Cukierman (Spain) Carlos Sánchez Jover
- Runners-up: (Argentina) Lorenzo Joaquín Rodríguez (Uruguay) Franco Roncadelli
- Score: 6–0, 3–6, [10–4]

Events
Singles	men	women
Doubles	men	women
- Engie Open Florianópolis

Pedro Boscardin Dias and Gustavo Heide were the defending champions but only Boscardin Dias chose to defend his title, partnering Gabriel Roveri Sidney. They lost in the first round to Luís Britto and Paulo André Saraiva dos Santos.

Daniel Cukierman and Carlos Sánchez Jover won the title after defeating Lorenzo Joaquín Rodríguez and Franco Roncadelli 6–0, 3–6, [10–4] in the final.

== Seeds ==
1. (Brazil) Orlando Luz / (Brazil) João Lucas Reis da Silva (quarterfinals, withdrew)
2. (United Kingdom) Scott Duncan / (Canada) Kelsey Stevenson (quarterfinals)
3. (Brazil) Daniel Dutra da Silva / (Brazil) Pedro Sakamoto (first round)
4. (Australia) Adam Taylor / (Argentina) Gonzalo Villanueva (semifinals)

== Draw ==
Key

- Q = Qualifier
- WC = Wild card
- LL = Lucky loser
- Alt = Alternate
- ITF = ITF entry
- PR = Protected ranking
- SR = Special ranking
- SE = Special exempt
- JE = Junior exempt
- JR = Junior Accelerator Programme entrant
- CO = College Accelerator Programme entrant
- NG = Next Gen Accelerator Program entrant
- w/o = Walkover
- r = Retired
- d = Defaulted

=== Draw ===
First round
1	(Brazil) O Luz (Brazil) JL Reis da Silva	7	6
WC	(Brazil) Joaquim Almeida (Brazil) Daniel Rebelo	5	1
Alt	(Brazil) Wilson Leite (Brazil) J Pereira	3	6	[7]
(Canada) L Draxl (Italy) Alexander Weis	6	3	[10]
3	(Brazil) D Dutra da Silva (Brazil) P Sakamoto	4	3
WC	(Argentina) Lorenzo Joaquín Rodríguez (Uruguay) F Roncadelli	6	6
(Sweden) S Freund (Denmark) J Ingildsen	6	0	[10]
(France) G Blancaneaux (France) E Couacaud	3	6	[4]
(Brazil) P Boscardin Dias (Brazil) Gabriel Roveri Sidney	1	6^{4}
(Brazil) L Britto (Brazil) PA Saraiva dos Santos	6	7^{7}
Alt	(Bolivia) JC Prado Ángelo (Paraguay) AD Vallejo
4	(Australia) A Taylor (Argentina) G Villanueva	w/o
(Israel) D Cukierman (Spain) C Sánchez Jover	6	7
(Brazil) M Pucinelli de Almeida (Brazil) Nicolas Zanellato	4	5
B Bobrov (Japan) K Uchida	6	5	[7]
2	(United Kingdom) S Duncan (Canada) K Stevenson	4	7	[10]

Quarterfinals
1	(Brazil) O Luz (Brazil) JL Reis da Silva
(Canada) L Draxl (Italy) A Weis	w/o
WC	(Argentina) LJ Rodríguez (Uruguay) F Roncadelli	3	7	[10]
(Sweden) S Freund (Denmark) J Ingildsen	6	5	[7]
(Brazil) L Britto (Brazil) PA Saraiva dos Santos	6	3	[2]
4	(Australia) A Taylor (Argentina) G Villanueva	3	6	[10]
(Israel) D Cukierman (Spain) C Sánchez Jover	6	6
2	(United Kingdom) S Duncan (Canada) K Stevenson	4	4

Semifinals
(Canada) L Draxl (Italy) A Weis	6^{3}	3
WC	(Argentina) LJ Rodríguez (Uruguay) F Roncadelli	7^{7}	6
4	(Australia) A Taylor (Argentina) G Villanueva	7	6^{8}	[7]
(Israel) D Cukierman (Spain) C Sánchez Jover	5	7^{10}	[10]

Final
WC	(Argentina) LJ Rodríguez (Uruguay) F Roncadelli	0	6	[4]
(Israel) D Cukierman (Spain) C Sánchez Jover	6	3	[10]
