= 2021 Florianópolis Challenger – Doubles =

Doubles
- 2021 Florianópolis Challenger

Final
- Champions: (Colombia) Nicolás Barrientos (Colombia) Alejandro Gómez
- Runners-up: (Uruguay) Martín Cuevas (Brazil) Rafael Matos
- Score: 6–3, 6–3

Events
Singles	Doubles
- Florianópolis Challenger

This was the first edition of the tournament.

Nicolás Barrientos and Alejandro Gómez won the title after defeating Martín Cuevas and Rafael Matos 6–3, 6–3 in the final.

== Seeds ==
1. (Venezuela) Luis David Martínez / (Brazil) Fernando Romboli (first round)
2. (Uruguay) Martín Cuevas / (Brazil) Rafael Matos (final)
3. (United States) James Cerretani / (Switzerland) Luca Margaroli (first round)
4. (Colombia) Nicolás Barrientos / (Colombia) Alejandro Gómez (champions)

== Draw ==
Key

- Q = Qualifier
- WC = Wild card
- LL = Lucky loser
- Alt = Alternate
- ITF = ITF entry
- PR = Protected ranking
- SR = Special ranking
- SE = Special exempt
- JE = Junior exempt
- JR = Junior Accelerator Programme entrant
- CO = College Accelerator Programme entrant
- NG = Next Gen Accelerator Program entrant
- w/o = Walkover
- r = Retired
- d = Defaulted

First round
1	(Venezuela) LD Martínez (Brazil) F Romboli	4	3
(Colombia) A González (Bolivia) F Zeballos	6	6
(Slovenia) T Lipovšek Puches (Argentina) JI Londero	4	4
(Dominican Republic) R Cid Subervi (Japan) K Uchida	6	6
4	(Colombia) N Barrientos (Colombia) A Gómez	6	7
WC	(Brazil) P Boscardin Dias (Brazil) E Ribeiro	2	5
WC	(Brazil) M Alves (Brazil) G Heide	6	7^{7}
(Spain) N Álvarez Varona (Netherlands) M Vervoort	3	6^{5}
WC	(Brazil) Wilson Leite (Brazil) JVC Loureiro	6	6
PR	(Argentina) JP Ficovich (Argentina) Matías Zukas	2	2
(Switzerland) L Castelnuovo (Peru) A Merino	7^{7}	6
3	(United States) J Cerretani (Switzerland) L Margaroli	6^{2}	3
(Italy) L Darderi (Switzerland) J Nikles	7	6
(Brazil) O Luz (Brazil) I Marcondes	5	3
(Brazil) Gabriel Roveri Sidney (Brazil) T Seyboth Wild	2	4
2	(Uruguay) M Cuevas (Brazil) R Matos	6	6

Quarterfinals
(Colombia) A González (Bolivia) F Zeballos	6	2	[5]
(Dominican Republic) R Cid Subervi (Japan) K Uchida	3	6	[10]
4	(Colombia) N Barrientos (Colombia) A Gómez	6	6
WC	(Brazil) M Alves (Brazil) G Heide	2	1
WC	(Brazil) W Leite (Brazil) JVC Loureiro	4	6	[10]
(Switzerland) L Castelnuovo (Peru) A Merino	6	3	[5]
(Italy) L Darderi (Switzerland) J Nikles	0	6	[7]
2	(Uruguay) M Cuevas (Brazil) R Matos	6	3	[10]

Semifinals
(Dominican Republic) R Cid Subervi (Japan) K Uchida	3	2
4	(Colombia) N Barrientos (Colombia) A Gómez	6	6
WC	(Brazil) W Leite (Brazil) JVC Loureiro	6	3	[3]
2	(Uruguay) M Cuevas (Brazil) R Matos	3	6	[10]

Final
4	(Colombia) N Barrientos (Colombia) A Gómez	6	6
2	(Uruguay) M Cuevas (Brazil) R Matos	3	3
