= 2025 Engie Open Florianópolis – Doubles =

Doubles
- 2025 Engie Open Florianópolis

Final
- Champions: (Bolivia) Boris Arias (Denmark) Johannes Ingildsen
- Runners-up: (Peru) Alexander Merino (Germany) Christoph Negritu
- Score: 3–6, 6–3, [10–8]

Events
Singles	Doubles
- Engie Open Florianópolis

Daniel Cukierman and Carlos Sánchez Jover were the defending champions but chose not to defend their title.

Boris Arias and Johannes Ingildsen won the title after defeating Alexander Merino and Christoph Negritu 3–6, 6–3, [10–8] in the final.

== Seeds ==
1. (Brazil) Marcelo Demoliner / (Brazil) Orlando Luz (first round)
2. (Argentina) Guido Andreozzi / (United States) Benjamin Kittay (semifinals)
3. (Bolivia) Boris Arias / (Denmark) Johannes Ingildsen (champions)
4. (Peru) Alexander Merino / (Germany) Christoph Negritu (final)

== Draw ==
Key

- Q = Qualifier
- WC = Wild card
- LL = Lucky loser
- Alt = Alternate
- ITF = ITF entry
- PR = Protected ranking
- SR = Special ranking
- SE = Special exempt
- JE = Junior exempt
- JR = Junior Accelerator Programme entrant
- CO = College Accelerator Programme entrant
- NG = Next Gen Accelerator Program entrant
- w/o = Walkover
- r = Retired
- d = Defaulted

First round
1	(Brazil) M Demoliner (Brazil) O Luz	2	7^{7}	[10]
(Argentina) GI Justo (Argentina) G Villanueva	6	6^{3}	[12]
(Brazil) G Heide (Brazil) E Ribeiro	6	6
(Brazil) P Boscardin Dias (Brazil) D Dutra da Silva	4	4
3	(Bolivia) B Arias (Denmark) J Ingildsen	6	6^{7}	[10]
(Brazil) Bruno Oliveira (Brazil) João Eduardo Schiessl	2	7^{9}	[8]
Alt	(Brazil) Wilson Leite (Brazil) J Pereira	6	3	[10]
Alt	(Argentina) Thiago Cigarrán (Bolivia) JC Prado Ángelo	3	6	[8]
(Brazil) M Alves (Argentina) S Rodríguez Taverna	w/o
WC	(Brazil) M Pucinelli de Almeida (Brazil) P Sakamoto
(Colombia) C Rodríguez (Bolivia) F Zeballos	4	3
4	(Peru) A Merino (Germany) C Negritu	6	6
(Argentina) Valentín Basel (Argentina) F Ribero	6	6
(Argentina) S de la Fuente (Argentina) GA Olivieri	3	2
Alt	(Brazil) Ryan Augusto dos Santos (Brazil) Bruno Fernandez	6^{4}	6^{2}
2	(Argentina) G Andreozzi (United States) B Kittay	7^{7}	7^{7}

Quarterfinals
(Argentina) GI Justo (Argentina) G Villanueva	w/o
(Brazil) G Heide (Brazil) E Ribeiro
3	(Bolivia) B Arias (Denmark) J Ingildsen	6	6
Alt	(Brazil) W Leite (Brazil) J Pereira	2	2
(Brazil) M Alves (Argentina) S Rodríguez Taverna	6^{4}	2
4	(Peru) A Merino (Germany) C Negritu	7^{7}	6
(Argentina) V Basel (Argentina) F Ribero	3	2
2	(Argentina) G Andreozzi (United States) B Kittay	6	6

Semifinals
(Argentina) GI Justo (Argentina) G Villanueva
3	(Bolivia) B Arias (Denmark) J Ingildsen	w/o
4	(Peru) A Merino (Germany) C Negritu	6	3	[10]
2	(Argentina) G Andreozzi (United States) B Kittay	3	6	[8]

Final
3	(Bolivia) B Arias (Denmark) J Ingildsen	3	6	[10]
4	(Peru) A Merino (Germany) C Negritu	6	3	[8]
