= 2024 Engie Open Florianópolis =

Tennis tournament

- Date: 1–7 April 2024
- Edition: 3rd (men); 1st (women)
- Category: ATP Challenger Tour; ITF Women's World Tennis Tour
- Prize money: $82,000 (men) $60,000 (women)
- Surface: Clay / Outdoor
- Location: Florianópolis, Brazil

Champions

Men's singles
- (France) Enzo Couacaud

Women's singles
- (Cyprus) Raluca Șerban

Men's doubles
- (Israel) Daniel Cukierman / (Spain) Carlos Sánchez Jover

Women's doubles
- Maria Kononova / Maria Kozyreva
← 2023 ·	Engie Open Florianópolis	· 2025 →

The 2024 ENGIE Open Florianópolis was a professional tennis tournament played on outdoor clay courts. It was the third (men) and 1st (women) editions of the tournament, which were part of the 2024 ATP Challenger Tour and the 2024 ITF Women's World Tennis Tour. It took place in Florianópolis, Brazil, between 1 and 7 April 2024.

== Champions ==
=== Men's singles ===
- (France) Enzo Couacaud def. (Brazil) João Lucas Reis da Silva 3–6, 6–4, 7–6^{(7–1)}.

=== Women's singles ===
- (Cyprus) Raluca Șerban def. (France) Séléna Janicijevic, 7–5, 6–2

=== Men's doubles ===
- (Israel) Daniel Cukierman / (Spain) Carlos Sánchez Jover def. (Argentina) Lorenzo Joaquín Rodríguez / (Uruguay) Franco Roncadelli 6–0, 3–6, [10–4].

=== Women's doubles ===
- Maria Kozyreva / Maria Kononova def. (Serbia) Katarina Jokić / (Brazil) Rebeca Pereira, 6–4, 6–3

== Men's singles main-draw entrants ==
=== Seeds ===
Country	Player	Rank^{1}	Seed
BRA	Thiago Monteiro	110	1
ARG	Francisco Comesaña	115	2
~~BRA~~	~~Felipe Meligeni Alves~~	~~134~~	~~3~~
ARG	Román Andrés Burruchaga	161	4
ARG	Genaro Alberto Olivieri	185	5
FRA	Geoffrey Blancaneaux	220	6
FRA	Enzo Couacaud	231	7
CAN	Liam Draxl	257	8

- ^{1} Rankings are as of 18 March 2024.

=== Other entrants ===
The following players received wildcards into the singles main draw:

- (Brazil) Pedro Boscardin Dias
- (Brazil) Gustavo Ribeiro de Almeida
- (Brazil) Nicolas Zanellato

The following player received entry into the singles main draw as a special exempt:

- (Paraguay) Daniel Vallejo

The following players received entry into the singles main draw as alternates:

- (Brazil) Eduardo Ribeiro
- (Argentina) Gonzalo Villanueva

The following players received entry from the qualifying draw:

- (Brazil) Mateo Barreiros Reyes
- (Israel) Daniel Cukierman
- (Argentina) Lorenzo Joaquín Rodríguez
- (Brazil) Gabriel Roveri Sidney
- (Brazil) Paulo André Saraiva dos Santos
- (Argentina) Camilo Ugo Carabelli

The following players received entry as lucky losers:

- (Brazil) Daniel Dutra da Silva
- (Bolivia) Juan Carlos Prado Ángelo

== Women's singles main draw entrants ==
=== Seeds ===
Country	Player	Rank	Seed
	Ekaterina Makarova	161	1
ARG	Martina Capurro Taborda	162	2
ARG	Solana Sierra	177	3
CYP	Raluca Șerban	208	4
FRA	Séléna Janicijevic	233	5
UKR	Valeriya Strakhova	252	6
USA	Maria Mateas	275	7
ITA	Georgia Pedone	298	8

- Rankings are as of 18 March 2024.

=== Other entrants ===
The following players received wildcards into the singles main draw:

- (Brazil) Camilla Bossi
- (Brazil) Ana Candiotto
- (Brazil) Luiza Fullana
- (Brazil) Júlia Konishi Camargo Silva

The following player received entry into the singles main draw using a special ranking:

- (Romania) Irina Fetecău

The following players received entry from the qualifying draw:

- (Argentina) Berta Bonardi
- (Italy) Nicole Fossa Huergo
- (Brazil) Letícia Garcia Vidal
- (Romania) Oana Gavrilă
- (Serbia) Katarina Jokić
- Maria Kononova
- (Chile) Fernanda Labraña
- (Bolivia) Noelia Zeballos
