= 2026 Latin America Open – Singles =

Singles
- 2026 Latin America Open

Final
- Champion: (Argentina) Román Andrés Burruchaga
- Runner-up: (Portugal) Jaime Faria
- Score: 6–7^{(5–7)}, 6–4, 6–4

Events
Singles	Doubles
- Latin America Open

This was the first edition of the tournament.

Román Andrés Burruchaga won the title after defeating Jaime Faria 6–7^{(5–7)}, 6–4, 6–4 in the final.

== Seeds ==
1. (United States) Emilio Nava (quarterfinals)
2. (Argentina) Thiago Agustín Tirante (withdrew)
3. (Argentina) Román Andrés Burruchaga (champion)
4. (Chile) Tomás Barrios Vera (quarterfinals)
5. (Portugal) Jaime Faria (final)
6. (Bolivia) Hugo Dellien (semifinals)
7. (Argentina) Alex Barrena (quarterfinals, retired)
8. (Bolivia) Juan Carlos Prado Ángelo (semifinals)

== Draw ==
Key

- Q = Qualifier
- WC = Wild card
- LL = Lucky loser
- Alt = Alternate
- ITF = ITF entry
- PR = Protected ranking
- SR = Special ranking
- SE = Special exempt
- JE = Junior exempt
- JR = Junior Accelerator Programme entrant
- CO = College Accelerator Programme entrant
- NG = Next Gen Accelerator Program entrant
- w/o = Walkover
- r = Retired
- d = Defaulted

=== Finals ===
Semifinals
5	(Portugal) Jaime Faria	6	6
6	(Bolivia) Hugo Dellien	4	1
3	(Argentina) Román Andrés Burruchaga	6	6
8	(Bolivia) Juan Carlos Prado Ángelo	3	2

Final
5	(Portugal) Jaime Faria	7^{7}	4	4
3	(Argentina) Román Andrés Burruchaga	6^{5}	6	6

=== Top half ===
First round
1	(United States) E Nava	6	6^{7}	7
Q	(Brazil) Rafael Tosetto	4	7^{9}	5
(Argentina) S Rodríguez Taverna	6	2	6
Q	(Bolivia) B Arias	3	6	3
(Brazil) F Meligeni Alves	6	6
Q	(Brazil) Victor Braga	1	0
Q	(Brazil) João Vítor Gonçalves Ceolin	2	2
5	(Portugal) J Faria	6	6
4	(Chile) T Barrios Vera	6	6
LL	(Brazil) J Pereira	3	3
Alt	(Brazil) P Sakamoto	4	6	4
(Brazil) T Monteiro	6	4	6
Q	(Brazil) João Eduardo Schiessl	1	2
(Argentina) F Díaz Acosta	6	6
(Brazil) JL Reis da Silva	6	2	3
6	(Bolivia) H Dellien	4	6	6

Second round
1	(United States) E Nava	6	0
(Argentina) S Rodríguez Taverna	2	0^{r}
(Brazil) F Meligeni Alves	2	6	2
5	(Portugal) J Faria	6	3	6
4	(Chile) T Barrios Vera	6
(Brazil) T Monteiro	6^{r}
(Argentina) F Díaz Acosta	4	6	3
6	(Bolivia) H Dellien	6	2	6

Quarterfinals
1	(United States) E Nava	6^{3}	1
5	(Portugal) J Faria	7^{7}	6
4	(Chile) T Barrios Vera	4	6^{4}
6	(Bolivia) H Dellien	6	7^{7}

Semifinals
5	(Portugal) J Faria	6	6
6	(Bolivia) H Dellien	4	1

=== Bottom half ===
First round
7	(Argentina) A Barrena	6	1	7^{7}
(Brazil) I Marcondes	4	6	6^{1}
(Peru) JP Varillas	7	6
WC	(Brazil) G Miguel	5	0
(Italy) G Cadenasso	2^{r}
WC	(Brazil) E Ribeiro	5
(Brazil) G Heide	6	6^{5}	4
3	(Argentina) RA Burruchaga	1	7^{7}	6
8	(Bolivia) JC Prado Ángelo	3	6	6
Alt	(Brazil) D Dutra da Silva	6	3	2
(Argentina) L Midón	3	6^{5}
(Ecuador) Á Guillén Meza	6	7^{7}
Alt	(Argentina) JB Torres	6	1	7^{7}
(Bolivia) M Dellien	4	6	6^{1}
(Peru) G Bueno	6	6
LL	(Peru) C Huertas del Pino	1	2

Second round
7	(Argentina) A Barrena	2	6	6
(Peru) JP Varillas	6	2	3
WC	(Brazil) E Ribeiro	6	4	4
3	(Argentina) RA Burruchaga	1	6	6
8	(Bolivia) JC Prado Ángelo	4	6	7^{7}
(Ecuador) Á Guillén Meza	6	1	6^{4}
Alt	(Argentina) JB Torres	1	3
(Peru) G Bueno	6	6

Quarterfinals
7	(Argentina) A Barrena	1	1^{r}
3	(Argentina) RA Burruchaga	6	3
8	(Bolivia) JC Prado Ángelo	4	6	6
(Peru) G Bueno	6	2	2

Semifinals
3	(Argentina) RA Burruchaga	6	6
8	(Bolivia) JC Prado Ángelo	3	2
