= 2026 Latin America Open – Doubles =

Doubles
- 2026 Latin America Open

Final
- Champions: (Brazil) Gustavo Heide (Brazil) Guto Miguel
- Runners-up: (Brazil) Felipe Meligeni Alves (Brazil) João Lucas Reis da Silva
- Score: 6–4, 6–2

Events
Singles	Doubles
- Latin America Open

This was the first edition of the tournament.

Gustavo Heide and Guto Miguel won the title after defeating Felipe Meligeni Alves and João Lucas Reis da Silva 6–4, 6–2 in the final.

== Seeds ==
1. (United States) Mac Kiger / (United States) Reese Stalder (semifinals)
2. (Israel) Daniel Cukierman / (Argentina) Mariano Kestelboim (semifinals)
3. (Bolivia) Boris Arias / (Denmark) Johannes Ingildsen (first round)
4. (Brazil) Bruno Oliveira / (Brazil) Marcelo Zormann (quarterfinals)

== Draw ==
Key

- Q = Qualifier
- WC = Wild card
- LL = Lucky loser
- Alt = Alternate
- ITF = ITF entry
- PR = Protected ranking
- SR = Special ranking
- SE = Special exempt
- JE = Junior exempt
- JR = Junior Accelerator Programme entrant
- CO = College Accelerator Programme entrant
- NG = Next Gen Accelerator Program entrant
- w/o = Walkover
- r = Retired
- d = Defaulted

First round
1	(United States) M Kiger (United States) R Stalder	6	6
WC	(Brazil) Wilson Leite (Brazil) J Pereira	0	1
(Argentina) F Díaz Acosta (Argentina) JB Torres	2	6	[9]
Alt	(Peru) A Huertas del Pino (Peru) C Huertas del Pino	6	2	[11]
3	(Bolivia) B Arias (Denmark) J Ingildsen	1	5
(Brazil) F Meligeni Alves (Brazil) JL Reis da Silva	6	7
(Uruguay) I Carou (Bolivia) JC Prado Ángelo	6	4	[6]
(Brazil) I Marcondes (Brazil) E Ribeiro	3	6	[10]
(Brazil) G Heide (Brazil) G Miguel	6	2	[11]
(Peru) G Bueno (Bolivia) M Dellien	1	6	[9]
(Argentina) A Barrena (Bolivia) H Dellien	7	3	[9]
4	(Brazil) Bruno Oliveira (Brazil) M Zormann	5	6	[11]
(Ecuador) Á Guillén Meza (Argentina) L Midón	3	2
(Brazil) D Dutra da Silva (Argentina) S Rodríguez Taverna	6	6
WC	(Brazil) P Sakamoto (Brazil) João Eduardo Schiessl	2	1
2	(Israel) D Cukierman (Argentina) M Kestelboim	6	6

Quarterfinals
1	(United States) M Kiger (United States) R Stalder	6	6
Alt	(Peru) A Huertas del Pino (Peru) C Huertas del Pino	3	2
(Brazil) F Meligeni Alves (Brazil) JL Reis da Silva	6	6
(Brazil) I Marcondes (Brazil) E Ribeiro	1	4
(Brazil) G Heide (Brazil) G Miguel	6	7
4	(Brazil) B Oliveira (Brazil) M Zormann	1	5
(Brazil) D Dutra da Silva (Argentina) S Rodríguez Taverna
2	(Israel) D Cukierman (Argentina) M Kestelboim	w/o

Semifinals
1	(United States) M Kiger (United States) R Stalder	4	6	[7]
(Brazil) F Meligeni Alves (Brazil) JL Reis da Silva	6	4	[10]
(Brazil) G Heide (Brazil) G Miguel	6	5	[10]
2	(Israel) D Cukierman (Argentina) M Kestelboim	2	7	[7]

Final
(Brazil) F Meligeni Alves (Brazil) JL Reis da Silva	4	2
(Brazil) G Heide (Brazil) G Miguel	6	6
