= 2026 San Diego Challenger – Singles =

Singles
- 2026 San Diego Challenger

Final
- Champion: (United States) Nishesh Basavareddy
- Runner-up: (Brazil) Igor Marcondes
- Score: 7–5, 6–4

Events
Singles	Doubles
- San Diego Challenger

This was the first edition of the tournament.

Nishesh Basavareddy won the title after defeating Igor Marcondes 7–5, 6–4 in the final.

== Seeds ==
1. (United States) Nishesh Basavareddy (champion)
2. (Argentina) Federico Agustín Gómez (quarterfinals)
3. (United States) Keegan Smith (second round)
4. (United States) Colton Smith (second round)
5. (Ecuador) Andy Andrade (quarterfinals)
6. (Canada) Liam Draxl (second round)
7. (United States) Braden Shick (first round)
8. (United States) Tristan Boyer (quarterfinals)

== Draw ==
Key

- Q = Qualifier
- WC = Wild card
- LL = Lucky loser
- Alt = Alternate
- ITF = ITF entry
- PR = Protected ranking
- SR = Special ranking
- SE = Special exempt
- JE = Junior exempt
- JR = Junior Accelerator Programme entrant
- CO = College Accelerator Programme entrant
- NG = Next Gen Accelerator Program entrant
- w/o = Walkover
- r = Retired
- d = Defaulted

=== Finals ===
Semifinals
1	(United States) Nishesh Basavareddy	6^{10}	6	5
CO	(Switzerland) Dylan Dietrich	7^{12}	4	1^{r}
Q	(France) Timo Legout	7^{7}	5	5
(Brazil) Igor Marcondes	6^{5}	7	7

Final
1	(United States) Nishesh Basavareddy	7	6
(Brazil) Igor Marcondes	5	4

=== Top half ===
First round
1	(United States) N Basavareddy	6	6
(Netherlands) M Röttgering	3	3
WC	(United States) K Hance	6	7
(United States) A Martin	4	5
(United States) Dar Blanch	4	7^{11}	6
(United States) JJ Wolf	6	6^{9}	1
(Jordan) A Shelbayh	6	5	3
5	(Ecuador) A Andrade	4	7	6
3	(United States) K Smith	6	4	6
(Australia) E Winter	3	6	2
WC	(Bulgaria) Dinko Dinev	3	1
CO	(Switzerland) D Dietrich	6	6
Q	(United States) E Zhu	3	7^{10}	3
(United Kingdom) H Searle	6	6^{8}	6
WC	(United States) J Kennedy	4	4
6	(Canada) L Draxl	6	6

Second round
1	(United States) N Basavareddy	6	4	6
WC	(United States) K Hance	2	6	3
(United States) Dar Blanch	6	3	5
5	(Ecuador) A Andrade	3	6	7
3	(United States) K Smith	2	6^{4}
CO	(Switzerland) D Dietrich	6	7^{7}
(United Kingdom) H Searle	7^{9}	2	6
6	(Canada) L Draxl	6^{7}	6	4

Quarterfinals
1	(United States) N Basavareddy	6	6
5	(Ecuador) A Andrade	3	2
CO	(Switzerland) D Dietrich	6	7
(United Kingdom) H Searle	3	5

Semifinals
1	(United States) N Basavareddy	6^{10}	6	5
CO	(Switzerland) D Dietrich	7^{12}	4	1^{r}

=== Bottom half ===
First round
8	(United States) T Boyer	7^{7}	6
Q	(United States) Spencer Johnson	6^{4}	1
Alt	(United States) M Krueger	6	5	5
Q	(United States) S Gorzny	4	7	7
Q	(France) T Legout	7	6^{5}	6
(United States) D Milavsky	5	7^{7}	2
(United States) S Kozlov	4	2
4	(United States) C Smith	6	6
7	(United States) B Shick	3	6^{5}
Alt	(United States) Patrick Maloney	6	7^{7}
Q	(United States) O Baris	1	3
(Brazil) I Marcondes	6	6
Q	E Arutiunian	3	3
CO	(United States) T Svajda	6	6
(United States) T Zink	2	3
2	(Argentina) FA Gómez	6	6

Second round
8	(United States) T Boyer	6	7^{9}
Q	(United States) S Gorzny	4	6^{7}
Q	(France) T Legout	6	6
4	(United States) C Smith	3	3
Alt	(United States) P Maloney	6	6^{7}	2
(Brazil) I Marcondes	3	7^{9}	6
CO	(United States) T Svajda	5	4
2	(Argentina) FA Gómez	7	6

Quarterfinals
8	(United States) T Boyer	6	5	5
Q	(France) T Legout	2	7	7
(Brazil) I Marcondes	4	6	6
2	(Argentina) FA Gómez	6	4	1

Semifinals
Q	(France) T Legout	7^{7}	5	5
(Brazil) I Marcondes	6^{5}	7	7
