= 2023 Florianópolis Challenger – Singles =

Singles
- 2023 Florianópolis Challenger

Final
- Champion: (Chile) Tomás Barrios Vera
- Runner-up: (Chile) Alejandro Tabilo
- Score: 6–4, 6–4

Events
Singles	Doubles
- Florianópolis Challenger

Igor Marcondes was the defending champion but chose not to defend his title.

Tomás Barrios Vera won the title after defeating Alejandro Tabilo 6–4, 6–4 in the final.

== Seeds ==
1. (Chile) Tomás Barrios Vera (champion)
2. (Chile) Alejandro Tabilo (final)
3. (Italy) Luciano Darderi (first round)
4. (Argentina) Andrea Collarini (second round)
5. (Argentina) Genaro Alberto Olivieri (quarterfinals)
6. (Brazil) Thiago Seyboth Wild (second round)
7. (Italy) Alessandro Giannessi (quarterfinals)
8. (Argentina) Francisco Comesaña (quarterfinals)

== Draw ==
Key

- Q = Qualifier
- WC = Wild card
- LL = Lucky loser
- Alt = Alternate
- ITF = ITF entry
- PR = Protected ranking
- SR = Special ranking
- SE = Special exempt
- JE = Junior exempt
- JR = Junior Accelerator Programme entrant
- CO = College Accelerator Programme entrant
- NG = Next Gen Accelerator Program entrant
- w/o = Walkover
- r = Retired
- d = Defaulted

=== Finals ===
Semifinals
1	(Chile) Tomás Barrios Vera	6	6
(Brazil) Eduardo Ribeiro	3	4
(Lebanon) Benjamin Hassan	4	6	3
2	(Chile) Alejandro Tabilo	6	4	6

Final
1	(Chile) Tomás Barrios Vera	6	6
2	(Chile) Alejandro Tabilo	4	4

=== Top half ===
First round
1	(Chile) T Barrios Vera	6	6
(Brazil) G Heide	4	4
(Argentina) G Villanueva	3	7^{7}	2
Q	(Argentina) GI Justo	6	6^{2}	6
Q	(Brazil) O Luz	6	6
Q	(Uruguay) I Carou	3	3
(France) G Mpetshi Perricard	5	5
5	(Argentina) GA Olivieri	7	7
4	(Argentina) A Collarini	6	6
(Argentina) RA Burruchaga	2	1
(Brazil) E Ribeiro	6	5	6
(Argentina) V Aboian	4	7	3
(Chile) G Lama	3	3
WC	(Brazil) J Fonseca	6	6
(Brazil) D Dutra da Silva	3	5
6	(Brazil) T Seyboth Wild	6	7

Second round
1	(Chile) T Barrios Vera	3	6	6
Q	(Argentina) GI Justo	6	3	3
Q	(Brazil) O Luz	7^{10}	4	2
5	(Argentina) GA Olivieri	6^{8}	6	6
4	(Argentina) A Collarini	7^{7}	6^{2}	4
(Brazil) E Ribeiro	6^{3}	7^{7}	6
WC	(Brazil) J Fonseca	3	6	6
6	(Brazil) T Seyboth Wild	6	3	4

Quarterfinals
1	(Chile) T Barrios Vera	6	7^{7}
5	(Argentina) GA Olivieri	3	6^{4}
(Brazil) E Ribeiro	6	6^{5}	7
WC	(Brazil) J Fonseca	1	7^{7}	5

Semifinals
1	(Chile) T Barrios Vera	6	6
(Brazil) E Ribeiro	3	4

=== Bottom half ===
First round
7	(Italy) A Giannessi	6	6
(Argentina) Juan Bautista Otegui	2	3
(Brazil) P Boscardin Dias	6	6
(France) M Janvier	4	2
Q	(Brazil) P Sakamoto	6	6
WC	(Brazil) Gustavo Ribeiro de Almeida	0	4
(Lebanon) B Hassan	5	6	6
3	(Italy) L Darderi	7	4	4
8	(Argentina) F Comesaña	6	6
Q	(Peru) A Huertas del Pino	4	0
Q	(Brazil) Wilson Leite	3	2
(Brazil) J Pereira	6	6
WC	(Brazil) Pedro Rodrigues	2	6^{4}
(Brazil) M Pucinelli de Almeida	6	7^{7}
(Peru) G Bueno	1	0
2	(Chile) A Tabilo	6	6

Second round
7	(Italy) A Giannessi	6	6
(Brazil) P Boscardin Dias	4	4
Q	(Brazil) P Sakamoto	6	3	2
(Lebanon) B Hassan	4	6	6
8	(Argentina) F Comesaña	7^{7}	6
(Brazil) J Pereira	6^{5}	2
(Brazil) M Pucinelli de Almeida	4	6^{2}
2	(Chile) A Tabilo	6	7^{7}

Quarterfinals
7	(Italy) A Giannessi	6	4	6^{8}
(Lebanon) B Hassan	3	6	7^{10}
8	(Argentina) F Comesaña	6	3	5
2	(Chile) A Tabilo	4	6	7

Semifinals
(Lebanon) B Hassan	4	6	3
2	(Chile) A Tabilo	6	4	6
