= 2026 San Diego Challenger =

- Date: 21 – 27 September
- Edition: 1st
- Surface: Hard
- Location: San Diego, United States

Champions

Singles
- (United States) Nishesh Basavareddy

Doubles
- (Netherlands) Stian Klaassen / (United States) Christopher Papa
- San Diego Challenger

The 2026 Tennis Warehouse Open (for sponsorship reasons) was a professional tennis tournament played on hardcourts. It was the first edition of the tournament which was part of the 2026 ATP Challenger Tour. It took place in San Diego, United States between 21 and 27 September 2026.

== Singles main-draw entrants ==
=== Seeds ===
Country	Player	Rank^{1}	Seed
USA	Nishesh Basavareddy	151	1
ARG	Federico Agustín Gómez	186	2
USA	Keegan Smith	192	3
USA	Colton Smith	202	4
ECU	Andy Andrade	203	5
CAN	Liam Draxl	205	6
USA	Braden Shick	206	7
USA	Tristan Boyer	214	8

- ^{1} Rankings are as of 14 September 2026.

=== Other entrants ===
The following players received wildcards into the singles main draw:

- (Bulgaria) Dinko Dinev
- (United States) Keaton Hance
- (United States) Jack Kennedy

The following players received entry into the singles main draw through the College Accelerator programme:

- (Switzerland) Dylan Dietrich
- (United States) Trevor Svajda

The following players received entry into the singles main draw as alternates:

- (United States) Mitchell Krueger
- (United States) Patrick Maloney

The following players received entry from the qualifying draw:

- Erik Arutiunian
- (United States) Ozan Baris
- (United States) Sebastian Gorzny
- (United States) Spencer Johnson
- (France) Timo Legout
- (United States) Evan Zhu

== Champions ==
=== Singles ===
- (United States) Nishesh Basavareddy def. (Brazil) Igor Marcondes 7–5, 6–4.

=== Doubles ===
- (Netherlands) Stian Klaassen / (United States) Christopher Papa def. (United States) Vignesh Gogineni / (United States) Noah Zamora 7–6^{(8–6)}, 5–7, [10–3].
