= Latin America Open =

- 2026 Latin America Open

ATP Challenger Tour
- Event name: Latin America Open (LA Open)
- Location: São Paulo, São Paulo, Brazil
- Venue: São Paulo Jockey Club
- Category: ATP Challenger 100
- Surface: Clay
- Website: LAOpen.com.br

Current champions (2026)
- Singles: (Argentina) Román Andrés Burruchaga
- Doubles: (Brazil) Gustavo Heide (Brazil) Guto Miguel

The Latin America Open, also known as the LA Open, is an ATP Challenger Tour tennis tournament that debuted in March 2026, held at the São Paulo Jockey Club, in São Paulo, Brazil.

This tournament is an ATP Challenger 100 event.

== Past finals ==
=== Singles ===
Year	Champion	Runner-up	Score
2026	(Argentina) Román Andrés Burruchaga	(Portugal) Jaime Faria	6–7^{(5–7)}, 6–4, 6–4

=== Doubles ===
Year	Champions	Runners-up	Score
2026	(Brazil) Gustavo Heide (Brazil) Guto Miguel	(Brazil) Felipe Meligeni Alves (Brazil) João Lucas Reis da Silva	6–4, 6–2
