= 2024 Lima Challenger II – Singles =

Singles
- 2024 Lima Challenger II

Final
- Champion: (Czech Republic) Vít Kopřiva
- Runner-up: (Denmark) Elmer Møller
- Score: 6–3, 7–6^{(7–3)}

Events
Singles	Doubles
← 2024 ·	Lima Challenger	· 2025 →

Juan Manuel Cerúndolo was the defending champion but lost in the semifinals to Vít Kopřiva.

Kopřiva won the title after defeating Elmer Møller 6–3, 7–6^{(7–3)} in the final.

== Seeds ==
1. (Argentina) Francisco Comesaña (quarterfinals)
2. (Argentina) Federico Coria (quarterfinals)
3. (Argentina) Camilo Ugo Carabelli (quarterfinals)
4. (Colombia) Daniel Elahi Galán (second round)
5. (Bolivia) Hugo Dellien (second round)
6. (Argentina) Marco Trungelliti (second round)
7. (Argentina) Juan Manuel Cerúndolo (semifinals)
8. (Chile) Cristian Garín (withdrew)

== Draw ==
Key

- Q = Qualifier
- WC = Wild card
- LL = Lucky loser
- Alt = Alternate
- ITF = ITF entry
- PR = Protected ranking
- SR = Special ranking
- SE = Special exempt
- JE = Junior exempt
- JR = Junior Accelerator Programme entrant
- CO = College Accelerator Programme entrant
- NG = Next Gen Accelerator Program entrant
- w/o = Walkover
- r = Retired
- d = Defaulted

=== Finals ===
Semifinals
(Czech Republic) Vít Kopřiva	3	6	6
7	(Argentina) Juan Manuel Cerúndolo	6	4	2
(Denmark) Elmer Møller	7	6
(Portugal) Henrique Rocha	5	1

Final
(Czech Republic) Vít Kopřiva	6	7^{7}
(Denmark) Elmer Møller	3	6^{3}

=== Top half ===
First round
1	(Argentina) F Comesaña	6	1	6
Alt	(United States) T Boyer	4	6	4
(Brazil) G Heide	4	2
Q	(Argentina) G Villanueva	6	6
(Czech Republic) V Kopřiva	6	4	6
WC	(Peru) G Bueno	4	6	3
(Argentina) A Collarini	4	5
6	(Argentina) M Trungelliti	6	7
3	(Argentina) C Ugo Carabelli	6	6
(Argentina) FA Gómez	2	1
(Peru) JP Varillas	4	4
(Bolivia) M Dellien	6	6
(Spain) O Roca Batalla	6	6
(Brazil) F Meligeni Alves	4	3
(Peru) I Buse	6	3	5
7	(Argentina) JM Cerúndolo	1	6	7

Second round
1	(Argentina) F Comesaña	6	6
Q	(Argentina) G Villanueva	2	1
(Czech Republic) V Kopřiva	3	6	6
6	(Argentina) M Trungelliti	6	4	3
3	(Argentina) C Ugo Carabelli	6	6
(Bolivia) M Dellien	3	0
(Spain) O Roca Batalla	4	2
7	(Argentina) JM Cerúndolo	6	6

Quarterfinals
1	(Argentina) F Comesaña	6	6^{3}	1
(Czech Republic) V Kopřiva	4	7^{7}	6
3	(Argentina) C Ugo Carabelli	1	1
7	(Argentina) JM Cerúndolo	6	6

Semifinals
(Czech Republic) V Kopřiva	3	6	6
7	(Argentina) JM Cerúndolo	6	4	2

=== Bottom half ===
First round
5	(Bolivia) H Dellien	6	6
WC	(Peru) A Huertas del Pino	1	2
WC	(Peru) C Huertas del Pino	2	3
(Lithuania) V Gaubas	6	6
Q	(Argentina) JB Torres	3	5
(Denmark) E Møller	6	7
Q	(France) Mathys Erhard	2	2
4	(Colombia) DE Galán	6	6
LL	(Portugal) G Elias	4	0
(Portugal) H Rocha	6	6
(Chile) T Barrios Vera	7	6
Q	(Netherlands) Michiel de Krom	5	1
Alt	(Paraguay) AD Vallejo	6	1	6
Q	(Uruguay) F Roncadelli	1	6	4
Q	(Brazil) O Luz	5	3
2	(Argentina) F Coria	7	6

Second round
5	(Bolivia) H Dellien	6	5	3
(Lithuania) V Gaubas	3	7	6
(Denmark) E Møller	6	6
4	(Colombia) DE Galán	4	2
(Portugal) H Rocha	7^{7}	3	6
(Chile) T Barrios Vera	6^{2}	6	2
Alt	(Paraguay) AD Vallejo	2	2
2	(Argentina) F Coria	6	6

Quarterfinals
(Lithuania) V Gaubas	4	6	0
(Denmark) E Møller	6	3	6
(Portugal) H Rocha	7^{7}	6
2	(Argentina) F Coria	6^{3}	0

Semifinals
(Denmark) E Møller	7	6
(Portugal) H Rocha	5	1
