= 2026 Abruzzo Open =

- Date: 4–10 May
- Edition: 8th
- Surface: Clay
- Location: Francavilla al Mare, Italy

Champions

Singles
- (Argentina) Facundo Díaz Acosta

Doubles
- (United States) Benjamin Kittay / (United States) Ryan Seggerman
- Abruzzo Open

The 2026 Abruzzo Open Francavilla al Mare was a professional tennis tournament played on clay courts. It was the eighth edition of the tournament which was part of the 2026 ATP Challenger Tour. It took place in Francavilla al Mare, Italy between 4 and 10 May 2026.

== Singles main-draw entrants ==
=== Seeds ===
Country	Player	Rank^{1}	Seed
GBR	Toby Samuel	163	1
TPE	Tseng Chun-hsin	168	2
ARG	Alex Barrena	170	3
USA	Nishesh Basavareddy	177	4
FRA	Clément Chidekh	179	5
BOL	Juan Carlos Prado Ángelo	180	6
ARG	Facundo Díaz Acosta	181	7
CZE	Zdeněk Kolář	182	8

- ^{1} Rankings are as of 20 April 2026.

=== Other entrants ===
The following players received wildcards into the singles main draw:

- (Italy) Federico Arnaboldi
- (Switzerland) Henry Bernet
- (Italy) Gabriele Piraino

The following players received entry into the singles main draw as special exempts:

- (Belgium) Buvaysar Gadamauri
- (Spain) Nikolás Sánchez Izquierdo

The following players received entry into the singles main draw through the Junior Accelerator programme:

- (France) Yannick Theodor Alexandrescou
- (Germany) Max Schönhaus

The following players received entry into the singles main draw as alternates:

- (United Kingdom) Felix Gill
- (Ecuador) Álvaro Guillén Meza
- (Spain) Alejandro Moro Cañas
- (United Kingdom) Harry Wendelken

The following players received entry from the qualifying draw:

- (Portugal) Frederico Ferreira Silva
- (Italy) Andrea Guerrieri
- (Czech Republic) Martin Krumich
- (France) Lilian Marmousez
- (Italy) Daniele Rapagnetta
- (United States) Ryan Seggerman

== Champions ==
=== Singles ===
- (Argentina) Facundo Díaz Acosta def. (Brazil) Gustavo Heide 5–7, 6–1, 6–2.

=== Doubles ===
- (United States) Benjamin Kittay / (United States) Ryan Seggerman def. (France) Arthur Reymond / (France) Luca Sanchez 6–4, 7–6^{(7–3)}.
