= 2024 Engie Open Florianópolis – Women's singles =

Women's singles
- 2024 Engie Open Florianópolis

Final
- Champion: (Cyprus) Raluca Șerban
- Runner-up: (France) Séléna Janicijevic
- Score: 7–5, 6–2

Events
Singles	men	women
Doubles	men	women
- Engie Open Florianópolis

This was the first edition of the tournament.

Raluca Șerban won the title, defeating Séléna Janicijevic in the final, 7–5, 6–2.

== Seeds ==
1. Ekaterina Makarova (first round)
2. (Argentina) Martina Capurro Taborda (first round, retired)
3. (Argentina) Solana Sierra (quarterfinals)
4. (Cyprus) Raluca Șerban (champion)
5. (France) Séléna Janicijevic (final)
6. (Ukraine) Valeriya Strakhova (first round)
7. (United States) Maria Mateas (first round, retired)
8. (Italy) Giorgia Pedone (semifinals)

== Draw ==
Key

- Q = Qualifier
- WC = Wild card
- LL = Lucky loser
- Alt = Alternate
- ITF = ITF entry
- PR = Protected ranking
- SR = Special ranking
- SE = Special exempt
- JE = Junior exempt
- JR = Junior Accelerator Programme entrant
- CO = College Accelerator Programme entrant
- NG = Next Gen Accelerator Program entrant
- w/o = Walkover
- r = Retired
- d = Defaulted

=== Finals ===
Semifinals
(Australia) Kaylah McPhee	2	2
4	(Cyprus) Raluca Șerban	6	6
5	(France) Séléna Janicijevic	6	6
8	(Italy) Giorgia Pedone	3	4

Final
4	(Cyprus) Raluca Șerban	7	6
5	(France) Séléna Janicijevic	5	2

=== Top half ===
First round
1	E Makarova	6	6^{2}	4
Q	(Romania) O Gavrilă	1	7^{7}	6
Q	(Serbia) K Jokić	4	2
SR	(Romania) I Fetecău	6	6
Q	(Italy) N Fossa Huergo	6^{4}	6	2
(Australia) K McPhee	7^{7}	3	6
D Lodikova	3
7	(United States) M Mateas	1^{r}
4	(Cyprus) R Șerban	6	6
Q	(Argentina) B Bonardi	1	0
(United States) R Kingsley	3	2
(Brazil) C Alves	6	6
(Brazil) G Cé	6	6
Q	(Brazil) L Garcia Vidal	0	2
(Italy) M Tona	6	6
6	(Ukraine) V Strakhova	1	0

Second round
Q	(Romania) O Gavrilă	3	1
SR	(Romania) I Fetecău	6	6
(Australia) K McPhee	6	6
D Lodikova	3	2
4	(Cyprus) R Șerban	6	6
(Brazil) C Alves	2	2
(Brazil) G Cé	2	6	2
(Italy) M Tona	6	4	6

Quarterfinals
SR	(Romania) I Fetecău	6^{6}	4
(Australia) K McPhee	7^{8}	6
4	(Cyprus) R Șerban	6	7^{7}
(Italy) M Tona	3	6^{5}

Semifinals
(Australia) K McPhee	2	2
4	(Cyprus) R Șerban	6	6

=== Bottom half ===
First round
5	(France) S Janicijevic	6	6
WC	(Brazil) J Konishi Camargo Silva	1	0
Q	(Bolivia) N Zeballos	3	7^{7}	6
M Kozyreva	6	6^{3}	2
WC	(Brazil) A Candiotto	1	3
(United States) M Sieg	6	6
WC	(Brazil) C Bossi	1	6	1
3	(Argentina) S Sierra	6	2	6
8	(Italy) G Pedone	6	6
Q	M Kononova	2	2
(Argentina) JL Estable	1	6	6
WC	(Brazil) L Fullana	6	2	0
(France) A Hesse	6	7
Q	(Chile) F Labraña	1	5
(Czech Republic) M Bayerlová	6	3
2	(Argentina) M Capurro Taborda	3	0^{r}

Second round
5	(France) S Janicijevic	7	6
Q	(Bolivia) N Zeballos	5	2
(United States) M Sieg	1	3
3	(Argentina) S Sierra	6	6
8	(Italy) G Pedone	6	6
(Argentina) JL Estable	4	2
(France) A Hesse	3	6	3
(Czech Republic) M Bayerlová	6	2	6

Quarterfinals
5	(France) S Janicijevic	7^{7}	6
3	(Argentina) S Sierra	6^{1}	0
8	(Italy) G Pedone	6	7
(Czech Republic) M Bayerlová	3	5

Semifinals
5	(France) S Janicijevic	6	6
8	(Italy) G Pedone	3	4
