= 2026 Abruzzo Open – Doubles =

Doubles
- 2026 Abruzzo Open

Final
- Champions: (United States) Benjamin Kittay (United States) Ryan Seggerman
- Runners-up: (France) Arthur Reymond (France) Luca Sanchez
- Score: 6–4, 7–6^{(7–3)}

Events
Singles	Doubles
- Abruzzo Open

Luis David Martínez and Facundo Mena were the defending champions but chose not to defend their title.

Benjamin Kittay and Ryan Seggerman won the title after defeating Arthur Reymond and Luca Sanchez 6–4, 7–6^{(7–3)} in the final.

== Seeds ==
1. (Brazil) Fernando Romboli / (Australia) John-Patrick Smith (quarterfinals, retired)
2. (Chinese Taipei) Ray Ho / (Germany) Hendrik Jebens (first round)
3. (Ecuador) Diego Hidalgo / (United States) Patrik Trhac (first round)
4. (Czech Republic) Matěj Vocel / (Czech Republic) Michael Vrbenský (quarterfinals)

== Draw ==
Key

- Q = Qualifier
- WC = Wild card
- LL = Lucky loser
- Alt = Alternate
- ITF = ITF entry
- PR = Protected ranking
- SR = Special ranking
- SE = Special exempt
- JE = Junior exempt
- JR = Junior Accelerator Programme entrant
- CO = College Accelerator Programme entrant
- NG = Next Gen Accelerator Program entrant
- w/o = Walkover
- r = Retired
- d = Defaulted

First round
1	(Brazil) F Romboli (Australia) J-P Smith	6	7
(United States) G Goldhoff (Denmark) J Ingildsen	3	5
(United States) M Kiger (United States) R Stalder	6	6
(New Zealand) F Reynolds (New Zealand) J Watt	3	4
3	(Ecuador) D Hidalgo (United States) P Trhac	4	6	[7]
(Australia) B Bayldon (Netherlands) M Veldheer	6	4	[10]
(France) A Reymond (France) L Sanchez	6	6
WC	(Italy) Angelo De Cesaris (Italy) Luca Maria Pomilio	2	4
(Ecuador) G Escobar (Croatia) N Serdarušić	6	6
WC	(Italy) Jacopo Bilardo (Italy) Daniele Rapagnetta	4	4
(Romania) A Jecan (Romania) B Pavel	4	2
4	(Czech Republic) M Vocel (Czech Republic) M Vrbenský	6	6
(Israel) D Cukierman (United States) T Hilderbrand	3	3
(Serbia) S Latinović; I Liutarevich	6	6
(United States) B Kittay (United States) R Seggerman	7^{10}	7^{7}
2	(Chinese Taipei) R Ho (Germany) H Jebens	6^{8}	6^{3}

Quarterfinals
1	(Brazil) F Romboli (Australia) J-P Smith	1	6^{r}
(United States) M Kiger (United States) R Stalder	6	6
(Australia) B Bayldon (Netherlands) M Veldheer	2	1
(France) A Reymond (France) L Sanchez	6	6
(Ecuador) G Escobar (Croatia) N Serdarušić	3	7	[10]
4	(Czech Republic) M Vocel (Czech Republic) M Vrbenský	6	5	[5]
(Serbia) S Latinović; I Liutarevich	6^{1}	4
(United States) B Kittay (United States) R Seggerman	7^{7}	6

Semifinals
(United States) M Kiger (United States) R Stalder	6	3	[7]
(France) A Reymond (France) L Sanchez	3	6	[10]
(Ecuador) G Escobar (Croatia) N Serdarušić	3	7^{7}	[7]
(United States) B Kittay (United States) R Seggerman	6	6^{5}	[10]

Final
(France) A Reymond (France) L Sanchez	4	6^{3}
(United States) B Kittay (United States) R Seggerman	6	7^{7}
