= 2026 Poznań Open =

- Date: 15 – 20 June
- Edition: 22nd
- Surface: Clay
- Location: Poznań, Poland
- Venue: Park Tenisowy Olimpia

Champions

Singles
- (Brazil) Gustavo Heide

Doubles
- (Spain) Sergio Martos Gornés / (Poland) Szymon Walków
- Poznań Open

The 2026 Enea Poznań Open was a professional tennis tournament played on clay courts. It was the 22nd edition of the tournament which was part of the 2026 ATP Challenger Tour. It took place at the Park Tenisowy Olimpia in Poznań, Poland from 15 to 20 June 2026.

== Singles main-draw entrants ==
=== Seeds ===
Country	Player	Rank^{1}	Seed
~~KAZ~~	~~Alexander Shevchenko~~	~~97~~	~~1~~
GBR	Jan Choinski	105	2
CZE	Dalibor Svrčina	107	3
ARG	Facundo Díaz Acosta	128	4
~~CZE~~	~~Zdeněk Kolář~~	~~162~~	~~5~~
AUT	Lukas Neumayer	168	6
PER	Gonzalo Bueno	180	7
BRA	Gustavo Heide	182	8
ARG	Genaro Alberto Olivieri	202	9
BRA	João Lucas Reis da Silva	205	10

- ^{1} Rankings are as of 8 June 2026.

=== Other entrants ===
The following players received wildcards into the singles main draw:

- (Poland) Tomasz Berkieta
- (Poland) Maks Kaśnikowski
- (Poland) Daniel Michalski

The following player received entry into the singles main draw through the Next Gen Accelerator programme:

- (Czech Republic) Petr Brunclík

The following players received entry into the singles main draw as alternates:

- (Croatia) Duje Ajduković
- (Czech Republic) Martin Krumich
- (Japan) Akira Santillan

The following players received entry from the qualifying draw:

- (Germany) Florian Broska
- (France) Mathys Erhard
- (Slovakia) Miloš Karol
- (Czech Republic) Maxim Mrva
- (Germany) Max Hans Rehberg
- (Poland) Alan Ważny

The following players received entry as lucky losers:

- (Slovakia) Norbert Gombos
- (Sweden) Olle Wallin

== Champions ==
=== Singles ===
- (Brazil) Gustavo Heide def. (Argentina) Facundo Díaz Acosta 6–2, 6–2.

=== Doubles ===
- (Spain) Sergio Martos Gornés / (Poland) Szymon Walków def. (Poland) Karol Drzewiecki / (Poland) Piotr Matuszewski 6–3, 7–5.
