= 2026 Poznań Open – Singles =

Singles
- 2026 Poznań Open

Final
- Champion: (Brazil) Gustavo Heide
- Runner-up: (Argentina) Facundo Díaz Acosta
- Score: 6–2, 6–2

Events
Singles	Doubles
- Poznań Open

Filip Misolic was the defending champion but chose not to defend his title.

Gustavo Heide won the title after defeating Facundo Díaz Acosta 6–2, 6–2 in the final.

== Seeds ==
1. (Kazakhstan) Alexander Shevchenko (withdrew)
2. (United Kingdom) Jan Choinski (quarterfinals)
3. (Czech Republic) Dalibor Svrčina (semifinals)
4. (Argentina) Facundo Díaz Acosta (final)
5. (Czech Republic) Zdeněk Kolář (withdrew)
6. (Austria) Lukas Neumayer (first round)
7. (Peru) Gonzalo Bueno (quarterfinals)
8. (Brazil) Gustavo Heide (champion)
9. (Argentina) Genaro Alberto Olivieri (second round)
10. (Brazil) João Lucas Reis da Silva (quarterfinals)

== Draw ==
Key

- Q = Qualifier
- WC = Wild card
- LL = Lucky loser
- Alt = Alternate
- ITF = ITF entry
- PR = Protected ranking
- SR = Special ranking
- SE = Special exempt
- JE = Junior exempt
- JR = Junior Accelerator Programme entrant
- CO = College Accelerator Programme entrant
- NG = Next Gen Accelerator Program entrant
- w/o = Walkover
- r = Retired
- d = Defaulted

=== Finals ===
Semifinals
(Italy) Michele Ribecai	6	1	4
4	(Argentina) Facundo Díaz Acosta	2	6	6
3	(Czech Republic) Dalibor Svrčina	6	5	2
8	(Brazil) Gustavo Heide	2	7	6

Final
4	(Argentina) Facundo Díaz Acosta	2	2
8	(Brazil) Gustavo Heide	6	6

=== Top half ===
First round
9	(Argentina) GA Olivieri	3	6	6
Q	(Germany) MH Rehberg	6	3	4
(Italy) M Ribecai	6	6
(Germany) H Squire	4	1
Alt	(Czech Republic) M Krumich	3	7	7^{7}
Q	(Poland) A Ważny	6	5	6^{4}
Q	(Slovakia) M Karol	3	7	3
10	(Brazil) JL Reis da Silva	6	5	6
4	(Argentina) F Díaz Acosta	6	7
(Uruguay) F Roncadelli	2	5
(Czech Republic) H Bartoň	6	6
(Belgium) K Coppejans	4	2
NG	(Czech Republic) Petr Brunclík	6	5
(India) S Nagal	4	4^{d}
Q	(Germany) F Broska	3	6	6
6	(Austria) L Neumayer	6	1	4

Second round
9	(Argentina) GA Olivieri	6^{5}	2
(Italy) M Ribecai	7^{7}	6
Alt	(Czech Republic) M Krumich	5	0
10	(Brazil) JL Reis da Silva	7	6
4	(Argentina) F Díaz Acosta	6	7
(Czech Republic) H Bartoň	3	5
NG	(Czech Republic) P Brunclík	4	0^{r}
Q	(Germany) F Broska	6	1

Quarterfinals
(Italy) M Ribecai	6	6
10	(Brazil) JL Reis da Silva	4	0
4	(Argentina) F Díaz Acosta	6	4	7^{7}
Q	(Germany) F Broska	3	6	6^{3}

Semifinals
(Italy) M Ribecai	6	1	4
4	(Argentina) F Díaz Acosta	2	6	6

=== Bottom half ===
First round
7	(Peru) G Bueno	7^{7}	6
WC	(Poland) T Berkieta	6^{4}	3
Q	(France) Mathys Erhard	4	3
(Portugal) F Ferreira Silva	6	6
LL	(Slovakia) N Gombos	6	6
LL	(Sweden) O Wallin	4	4
Alt	(Croatia) D Ajduković	3	3
3	(Czech Republic) D Svrčina	6	6
8	(Brazil) G Heide	6	6
WC	(Poland) D Michalski	2	2
Q	(Czech Republic) M Mrva	6	6
Alt	(Japan) A Santillan	3	2
WC	(Poland) M Kaśnikowski	6	7^{7}
(Italy) L Giustino	4	6^{1}
(Brazil) P Boscardin Dias	5	0
2	(United Kingdom) J Choinski	7	6

Second round
7	(Peru) G Bueno	6	6
(Portugal) F Ferreira Silva	4	3
LL	(Slovakia) N Gombos	4	2
3	(Czech Republic) D Svrčina	6	6
8	(Brazil) G Heide	6	6
Q	(Czech Republic) M Mrva	3	3
WC	(Poland) M Kaśnikowski	4	6	3
2	(United Kingdom) J Choinski	6	2	6

Quarterfinals
7	(Peru) G Bueno	2	3
3	(Czech Republic) D Svrčina	6	6
8	(Brazil) G Heide	7^{7}	3	6
2	(United Kingdom) J Choinski	6^{5}	6	4

Semifinals
3	(Czech Republic) D Svrčina	6	5	2
8	(Brazil) G Heide	2	7	6
