= 2026 Poznań Open – Doubles =

Doubles
- 2026 Poznań Open

Final
- Champions: (Spain) Sergio Martos Gornés (Poland) Szymon Walków
- Runners-up: (Poland) Karol Drzewiecki (Poland) Piotr Matuszewski
- Score: 6–3, 7–5

Events
Singles	Doubles
- Poznań Open

Sergio Martos Gornés and Vijay Sundar Prashanth were the defending champions but only Martos Gornés chose to defend his title, partnering Szymon Walków. He successfully defended his title after defeating Karol Drzewiecki and Piotr Matuszewski 6–3, 7–5 in the final.

== Seeds ==
1. Ivan Liutarevich / (Poland) Filip Pieczonka (first round)
2. (Bulgaria) Alexander Donski / (Czech Republic) Andrew Paulson (semifinals)
3. (Poland) Szymon Kielan / (Australia) Matthew Romios (first round)
4. (Czech Republic) Filip Duda / (Czech Republic) Michael Vrbenský (first round)

== Draw ==
Key

- Q = Qualifier
- WC = Wild card
- LL = Lucky loser
- Alt = Alternate
- ITF = ITF entry
- PR = Protected ranking
- SR = Special ranking
- SE = Special exempt
- JE = Junior exempt
- JR = Junior Accelerator Programme entrant
- CO = College Accelerator Programme entrant
- NG = Next Gen Accelerator Program entrant
- w/o = Walkover
- r = Retired
- d = Defaulted

First round
1	I Liutarevich (Poland) F Pieczonka	3	6	[4]
(Poland) K Drzewiecki (Poland) P Matuszewski	6	2	[10]
(Serbia) I Sabanov (Serbia) M Sabanov	6	3	[4]
(Switzerland) L Castelnuovo (Japan) A Santillan	4	6	[10]
4	(Czech Republic) F Duda (Czech Republic) M Vrbenský	1	2
(Spain) Í Cervantes (Ukraine) D Molchanov	6	6
(Slovakia) M Karol (Croatia) N Serdarušić	6	3	[10]
Alt	(Egypt) Michael Bassem Sobhy (Egypt) Fares Zakaria	3	6	[4]
(Bolivia) B Arias (Czech Republic) D Poljak	4	2
(Spain) S Martos Gornés (Poland) S Walków	6	6
Alt	(Poland) T Berkieta (Poland) M Kaśnikowski	3	7	[10]
3	(Poland) S Kielan (Australia) M Romios	6	5	[7]
WC	(Poland) Aleksander Błuś (Poland) Jan Sadzik	6^{3}	7^{7}	[10]
(Spain) M Mansilla Díez (Spain) B Winter López	7^{7}	6^{5}	[8]
WC	(Finland) O Paldanius (Poland) A Ważny	6^{5}	5
2	(Bulgaria) A Donski (Czech Republic) A Paulson	7^{7}	7

Quarterfinals
(Poland) K Drzewiecki (Poland) P Matuszewski	7^{7}	6^{6}	[10]
(Switzerland) L Castelnuovo (Japan) A Santillan	6^{5}	7^{8}	[5]
(Spain) Í Cervantes (Ukraine) D Molchanov	5	6	[10]
(Slovakia) M Karol (Croatia) N Serdarušić	7	2	[8]
(Spain) S Martos Gornés (Poland) S Walków	6	6
Alt	(Poland) T Berkieta (Poland) M Kaśnikowski	3	2
WC	(Poland) A Błuś (Poland) J Sadzik	2	1
2	(Bulgaria) A Donski (Czech Republic) A Paulson	6	6

Semifinals
(Poland) K Drzewiecki (Poland) P Matuszewski	7	6^{5}	[10]
(Spain) Í Cervantes (Ukraine) D Molchanov	5	7^{7}	[4]
(Spain) S Martos Gornés (Poland) S Walków	6	6^{4}	[10]
2	(Bulgaria) A Donski (Czech Republic) A Paulson	4	7^{7}	[7]

Final
(Poland) K Drzewiecki (Poland) P Matuszewski	3	5
(Spain) S Martos Gornés (Poland) S Walków	6	7
