= 2026 Abruzzo Open – Singles =

Singles
- 2026 Abruzzo Open

Final
- Champion: (Argentina) Facundo Díaz Acosta
- Runner-up: (Brazil) Gustavo Heide
- Score: 5–7, 6–1, 6–2

Events
Singles	Doubles
- Abruzzo Open

Francesco Maestrelli was the defending champion but chose not to defend his title.

Facundo Díaz Acosta won the title after defeating Gustavo Heide 5–7, 6–1, 6–2 in the final.

== Seeds ==
1. (United Kingdom) Toby Samuel (first round)
2. (Chinese Taipei) Tseng Chun-hsin (quarterfinals)
3. (Argentina) Alex Barrena (first round)
4. (United States) Nishesh Basavareddy (second round)
5. (France) Clément Chidekh (second round)
6. (Bolivia) Juan Carlos Prado Ángelo (second round)
7. (Argentina) Facundo Díaz Acosta (champion)
8. (Czech Republic) Zdeněk Kolář (second round)

== Draw ==
Key

- Q = Qualifier
- WC = Wild card
- LL = Lucky loser
- Alt = Alternate
- ITF = ITF entry
- PR = Protected ranking
- SR = Special ranking
- SE = Special exempt
- JE = Junior exempt
- JR = Junior Accelerator Programme entrant
- CO = College Accelerator Programme entrant
- NG = Next Gen Accelerator Program entrant
- w/o = Walkover
- r = Retired
- d = Defaulted

=== Finals ===
Semifinals
(Brazil) Gustavo Heide	6	1	6
(Denmark) August Holmgren	4	6	1
Q	(United States) Ryan Seggerman	3	0
7	(Argentina) Facundo Díaz Acosta	6	6

Final
(Brazil) Gustavo Heide	7	1	2
7	(Argentina) Facundo Díaz Acosta	5	6	6

=== Top half ===
First round
1	(United Kingdom) T Samuel	3	6	4
(Greece) S Sakellaridis	6	2	6
(Brazil) G Heide	2	6	6
Q	(France) Lilian Marmousez	6	0	0
Q	(Czech Republic) M Krumich	6	6
WC	(Italy) G Piraino	4	4
Alt	(Ecuador) Á Guillén Meza	5	2
5	(France) C Chidekh	7	6
3	(Argentina) A Barrena	4	2
(Denmark) A Holmgren	6	6
(Argentina) JP Ficovich	6	6^{5}	3
(Netherlands) G den Ouden	4	7^{7}	6
Q	(Italy) Daniele Rapagnetta	3	3
JR	(Germany) M Schönhaus	6	6
Alt	(United Kingdom) F Gill	4	4
8	(Czech Republic) Z Kolář	6	6

Second round
(Greece) S Sakellaridis	4	6^{3}
(Brazil) G Heide	6	7^{7}
Q	(Czech Republic) M Krumich	6	6
5	(France) C Chidekh	4	2
(Denmark) A Holmgren	6	6
(Netherlands) G den Ouden	4	4
JR	(Germany) M Schönhaus	6	7^{7}
8	(Czech Republic) Z Kolář	3	6^{5}

Quarterfinals
(Brazil) G Heide	6	6
Q	(Czech Republic) M Krumich	4	2
(Denmark) A Holmgren	7	2	6
JR	(Germany) M Schönhaus	5	6	3

Semifinals
(Brazil) G Heide	6	1	6
(Denmark) A Holmgren	4	6	1

=== Bottom half ===
First round
6	(Bolivia) JC Prado Ángelo	6	6
SE	(Belgium) B Gadamauri	4	4
Q	(United States) R Seggerman	6	4	6
JR	(France) YT Alexandrescou	2	6	4
(United Kingdom) J Clarke	6	6
WC	(Italy) F Arnaboldi	1	1
Alt	(Spain) A Moro Cañas	6	4	1
4	(United States) N Basavareddy	3	6	6
7	(Argentina) F Díaz Acosta	5	6	6
WC	(Switzerland) H Bernet	7	3	1
(Germany) J Engel	7^{7}	2	2
SE	(Spain) N Sánchez Izquierdo	6^{2}	6	6
Alt	(United Kingdom) H Wendelken	3	3
Q	(Portugal) F Ferreira Silva	6	6
Q	(Italy) A Guerrieri	3	2
2	(Chinese Taipei) C-h Tseng	6	6

Second round
6	(Bolivia) JC Prado Ángelo	7^{7}	5	6^{5}
Q	(United States) R Seggerman	6^{5}	7	7^{7}
(United Kingdom) J Clarke	6	6
4	(United States) N Basavareddy	4	2
7	(Argentina) F Díaz Acosta	6	6
SE	(Spain) N Sánchez Izquierdo	4	4
Q	(Portugal) F Ferreira Silva	1	2
2	(Chinese Taipei) C-h Tseng	6	6

Quarterfinals
Q	(United States) R Seggerman	6^{8}	6	6
(United Kingdom) J Clarke	7^{10}	4	4
7	(Argentina) F Díaz Acosta	7^{7}	6
2	(Chinese Taipei) C-h Tseng	6^{2}	4

Semifinals
Q	(United States) R Seggerman	3	0
7	(Argentina) F Díaz Acosta	6	6
