= 2024 Lima Challenger II =

- Date: 4–10 November
- Edition: 22nd
- Surface: Clay
- Location: Lima, Peru

Champions

Singles
- (Czech Republic) Vít Kopřiva

Doubles
- (Poland) Karol Drzewiecki / (Poland) Piotr Matuszewski
- Lima Challenger

The 2024 DirecTV Open Lima was a professional tennis tournament played on clay courts. It was the 22nd edition of the tournament which was part of the 2024 ATP Challenger Tour. It took place in Lima, Peru between 4 and 10 November 2024.

== Singles main-draw entrants ==
=== Seeds ===
Country	Player	Rank^{1}	Seed
ARG	Francisco Comesaña	101	1
ARG	Federico Coria	104	2
ARG	Camilo Ugo Carabelli	106	3
COL	Daniel Elahi Galán	112	4
BOL	Hugo Dellien	122	5
ARG	Marco Trungelliti	136	6
ARG	Juan Manuel Cerúndolo	142	7
~~CHI~~	~~Cristian Garín~~	~~147~~	~~8~~

- ^{1} Rankings are as of 28 October 2024.

=== Other entrants ===
The following players received wildcards into the singles main draw:

- (Peru) Gonzalo Bueno
- (Peru) Arklon Huertas del Pino
- (Peru) Conner Huertas del Pino

The following players received entry into the singles main draw as alternates:

- (United States) Tristan Boyer
- (Paraguay) Daniel Vallejo

The following players received entry from the qualifying draw:

- (Netherlands) Michiel de Krom
- (France) Mathys Erhard
- (Brazil) Orlando Luz
- (Uruguay) Franco Roncadelli
- (Argentina) Juan Bautista Torres
- (Argentina) Gonzalo Villanueva

The following player received entry as a lucky loser:

- (Portugal) Gastão Elias

== Champions ==
=== Singles ===
- (Czech Republic) Vít Kopřiva def. (Denmark) Elmer Møller 6–3, 7–6^{(7–3)}.

=== Doubles ===
- (Poland) Karol Drzewiecki / (Poland) Piotr Matuszewski def. (Brazil) Luís Britto / (Brazil) Gustavo Heide 7–5, 6–4.
