= 2026 Latin America Open =

- Date: 23–29 March
- Edition: 1st
- Surface: Clay
- Location: São Paulo, Brazil

Champions

Singles
- (Argentina) Román Andrés Burruchaga

Doubles
- (Brazil) Gustavo Heide / (Brazil) Guto Miguel
- Latin America Open

The 2026 LA Open was a professional tennis tournament played on clay courts. It was the first edition of the tournament which was part of the 2026 ATP Challenger Tour. It took place in São Paulo, Brazil between 23 and 29 March 2026.

== Singles main draw entrants ==
=== Seeds ===
Country	Player	Rank^{1}	Seed
USA	Emilio Nava	74	1
~~ARG~~	~~Thiago Agustín Tirante~~	~~81~~	~~2~~
ARG	Román Andrés Burruchaga	102	3
CHI	Tomás Barrios Vera	119	4
POR	Jaime Faria	157	5
BOL	Hugo Dellien	159	6
ARG	Alex Barrena	173	7
BOL	Juan Carlos Prado Ángelo	206	8

- ^{1} Rankings as of 16 March 2026.

=== Other entrants ===
The following players received wildcards into the singles main draw:

- (Brazil) Guto Miguel
- (Brazil) Eduardo Ribeiro
- (Argentina) ~~Thiago Agustín Tirante~~

The following players received entry into the singles main draw as alternates:

- (Brazil) Daniel Dutra da Silva
- (Brazil) Pedro Sakamoto
- (Argentina) Juan Bautista Torres

The following players received entry from the qualifying draw:

- (Bolivia) Boris Arias
- (Brazil) Victor Braga
- (Brazil) João Vítor Gonçalves Ceolin
- (Denmark) ~~Johannes Ingildsen~~
- (Brazil) João Eduardo Schiessl
- (Brazil) Rafael Tosetto

The following players received entry as lucky losers:

- (Peru) Conner Huertas del Pino
- (Brazil) José Pereira

== Champions ==
=== Singles ===
- (Argentina) Román Andrés Burruchaga def. (Portugal) Jaime Faria 6–7^{(5–7)}, 6–4, 6–4.

=== Doubles ===
- (Brazil) Gustavo Heide / (Brazil) Guto Miguel def. (Brazil) Felipe Meligeni Alves / (Brazil) João Lucas Reis da Silva 6–4, 6–2.
