= 2024 Engie Open Florianópolis – Women's doubles =

Women's doubles
- 2024 Engie Open Florianópolis

Final
- Champions: Maria Kononova; Maria Kozyreva
- Runners-up: (Serbia) Katarina Jokić (Brazil) Rebeca Pereira
- Score: 6–4, 6–3

Events
Singles	men	women
Doubles	men	women
Engie Open Florianópolis

This was the first edition of the tournament.

Maria Kononova and Maria Kozyreva won the title, defeating Katarina Jokić and Rebeca Pereira in the final, 6–4, 6–3.

== Seeds ==
1. (Romania) Oana Gavrilă / (Ukraine) Valeriya Strakhova (semifinals)
2. Maria Kononova / Maria Kozyreva (champions)
3. (Peru) Romina Ccuno / (Australia) Kaylah McPhee (quarterfinals)
4. (Czech Republic) Michaela Bayerlová / (Italy) Nicole Fossa Huergo (quarterfinals)

== Draw ==
Key

- Q = Qualifier
- WC = Wild card
- LL = Lucky loser
- Alt = Alternate
- ITF = ITF entry
- PR = Protected ranking
- SR = Special ranking
- SE = Special exempt
- JE = Junior exempt
- JR = Junior Accelerator Programme entrant
- CO = College Accelerator Programme entrant
- NG = Next Gen Accelerator Program entrant
- w/o = Walkover
- r = Retired
- d = Defaulted

First round
1	(Romania) O Gavrilă (Ukraine) V Strakhova	6	6
WC	(Brazil) L Fullana (Brazil) G Gulin	2	3
(Brazil) A Candiotto (Italy) M Tona	3	2
(United States) J Daniel (United States) M Sieg	6	6
3	(Peru) R Ccuno (Australia) K McPhee	6	6
Alt	(United States) A Crump (United States) Z Hitt	2	4
(Serbia) K Jokić (Brazil) R Pereira	4	6	[10]
WC	(Brazil) C Bossi (Brazil) L Garcia Vidal	6	2	[2]
(France) A Hesse; E Makarova	6	6
(Brazil) C Bohrer Martins (Brazil) J Konishi Camargo Silva	3	1
D Lodikova (Italy) G Pedone	1	3
4	(Czech Republic) M Bayerlová (Italy) N Fossa Huergo	6	6
WC	(Brazil) S Mendonça (Brazil) ML Oliveira	3	2
(United States) S León (Slovakia) M Okáľová	6	6
(Argentina) B Bonardi (Bolivia) N Zeballos	4	4
2	M Kononova; M Kozyreva	6	6

Quarterfinals
1	(Romania) O Gavrilă (Ukraine) V Strakhova	6	6
(United States) J Daniel (United States) M Sieg	2	4
3	(Peru) R Ccuno (Australia) K McPhee	7	2	[13]
(Serbia) K Jokić (Brazil) R Pereira	5	6	[15]
(France) A Hesse; E Makarova	6	3	[10]
4	(Czech Republic) M Bayerlová (Italy) N Fossa Huergo	2	6	[7]
(United States) S León (Slovakia) M Okáľová	3	3
2	M Kononova; M Kozyreva	6	6

Semifinals
1	(Romania) O Gavrilă (Ukraine) V Strakhova	6	4	[8]
(Serbia) K Jokić (Brazil) R Pereira	3	6	[10]
(France) A Hesse; E Makarova	6^{6}	3
2	M Kononova; M Kozyreva	7^{8}	6

Final
(Serbia) K Jokić (Brazil) R Pereira	4	3
2	M Kononova; M Kozyreva	6	6
