= 2024 Lima Challenger II – Doubles =

Doubles
- 2024 Lima Challenger II

Final
- Champions: (Poland) Karol Drzewiecki (Poland) Piotr Matuszewski
- Runners-up: (Brazil) Luís Britto (Brazil) Gustavo Heide
- Score: 7–5, 6–4

Events
Singles	Doubles
← 2024 ·	Lima Challenger	· 2025 →

Hady Habib and Trey Hilderbrand were the defending champions but chose not to defend their title.

Karol Drzewiecki and Piotr Matuszewski won the title after defeating Luís Britto and Gustavo Heide 7–5, 6–4 in the final.

== Seeds ==
1. (Brazil) Orlando Luz / (Brazil) Marcelo Zormann (semifinals)
2. (Poland) Karol Drzewiecki / (Poland) Piotr Matuszewski (champions)
3. (Bolivia) Boris Arias / (Bolivia) Federico Zeballos (first round)
4. (Argentina) Federico Agustín Gómez / (Venezuela) Luis David Martínez (quarterfinals)

== Draw ==
=== Key ===
- Q = Qualifier
- WC = Wild card
- LL = Lucky loser
- Alt = Alternate
- ITF = ITF entry
- PR = Protected ranking
- SR = Special ranking
- SE = Special exempt
- JE = Junior exempt
- JR = Junior Accelerator Programme entrant
- CO = College Accelerator Programme entrant
- NG = Next Gen Accelerator Program entrant
- w/o = Walkover
- r = Retired
- d = Defaulted

=== Draw ===
First round
1	(Brazil) O Luz (Brazil) M Zormann	6	2	[10]
Alt	(Netherlands) Michiel de Krom (Argentina) G Villanueva	4	6	[7]
(Argentina) M Kestelboim (Brazil) F Romboli	6	6
(United Kingdom) S Duncan (United States) H Reese	0	1
3	(Bolivia) B Arias (Bolivia) F Zeballos	6^{7}	5
(Bolivia) M Dellien (Uruguay) F Roncadelli	7^{9}	7
(Brazil) L Britto (Brazil) G Heide	6	6
(Uruguay) I Carou (Argentina) F Coria	4	4
(Peru) G Bueno (Peru) I Buse	0	6	[12]
(Peru) A Huertas del Pino (Peru) C Huertas del Pino	6	4	[14]
WC	(United States) Milledge Cossu (Mexico) A Hernández	0	2
4	(Argentina) FA Gómez (Venezuela) LD Martínez	6	6
(Spain) Í Cervantes (Spain) O Roca Batalla	7^{7}	6
WC	(Peru) Vicente Monge (Peru) Rodrigo Varillas	6^{1}	4
(Denmark) E Møller (Netherlands) Ryan Nijboer	6^{5}	6	[6]
2	(Poland) K Drzewiecki (Poland) P Matuszewski	7^{7}	4	[10]

Quarterfinals
1	(Brazil) O Luz (Brazil) M Zormann	6	6
(Argentina) M Kestelboim (Brazil) F Romboli	4	3
(Bolivia) M Dellien (Uruguay) F Roncadelli	6^{2}	4
(Brazil) L Britto (Brazil) G Heide	7^{7}	6
(Peru) A Huertas del Pino (Peru) C Huertas del Pino	6	6
4	(Argentina) FA Gómez (Venezuela) LD Martínez	3	4
(Spain) Í Cervantes (Spain) O Roca Batalla	6	3	[8]
2	(Poland) K Drzewiecki (Poland) P Matuszewski	3	6	[10]

Semifinals
1	(Brazil) O Luz (Brazil) M Zormann	7^{7}	1	[7]
(Brazil) L Britto (Brazil) G Heide	6^{2}	6	[10]
(Peru) A Huertas del Pino (Peru) C Huertas del Pino	3	6^{3}
2	(Poland) K Drzewiecki (Poland) P Matuszewski	6	7^{7}

Final
(Brazil) L Britto (Brazil) G Heide	5	4
2	(Poland) K Drzewiecki (Poland) P Matuszewski	7	6
