= 2025 Engie Open Florianópolis – Singles =

Singles
- 2025 Engie Open Florianópolis

Final
- Champion: (Brazil) Gustavo Heide
- Runner-up: (Argentina) Andrea Collarini
- Score: 6–2, 6–3

Events
Singles	Doubles
- Engie Open Florianópolis

Enzo Couacaud was the defending champion but chose not to defend his title after retiring from professional tennis earlier in the year.

Gustavo Heide won the title after defeating Andrea Collarini 6–2, 6–3 in the final.

== Seeds ==
1. (Brazil) João Lucas Reis da Silva (second round)
2. (Argentina) Genaro Alberto Olivieri (first round)
3. (Argentina) Facundo Díaz Acosta (second round)
4. (Kazakhstan) Dmitry Popko (first round, retired)
5. (Bolivia) Juan Carlos Prado Ángelo (semifinals)
6. (Argentina) Santiago Rodríguez Taverna (first round)
7. (Argentina) Nicolás Kicker (quarterfinals, retired)
8. (Argentina) Andrea Collarini (final)

== Draw ==
Key

- Q = Qualifier
- WC = Wild card
- LL = Lucky loser
- Alt = Alternate
- ITF = ITF entry
- PR = Protected ranking
- SR = Special ranking
- SE = Special exempt
- JE = Junior exempt
- JR = Junior Accelerator Programme entrant
- CO = College Accelerator Programme entrant
- NG = Next Gen Accelerator Program entrant
- w/o = Walkover
- r = Retired
- d = Defaulted

=== Finals ===
Semifinals
(Brazil) Daniel Dutra da Silva	2	2
(Brazil) Gustavo Heide	6	6
8	(Argentina) Andrea Collarini	6	6
5	(Bolivia) Juan Carlos Prado Ángelo	4	3

Final
(Brazil) Gustavo Heide	6	6
8	(Argentina) Andrea Collarini	2	3

=== Top half ===
First round
1	(Brazil) JL Reis da Silva	6	6
Alt	(United States) B Kuzuhara	1	3
(Argentina) GI Justo	6	4	7
Alt	(Brazil) João Eduardo Schiessl	4	6	5
JR	(Colombia) Miguel Tobón	1	6^{2}
(Argentina) JB Torres	6	7^{7}
(Brazil) D Dutra da Silva	6	6
6	(Argentina) S Rodríguez Taverna	3	4
4	(Kazakhstan) D Popko	0^{r}
(Brazil) M Alves	2
(Brazil) G Heide	6	6
WC	(Brazil) Leonardo Storck França	1	2
Q	(Brazil) Nicolas Zanellato	6	3	2
(Argentina) G Villanueva	3	6	6
(Brazil) M Pucinelli de Almeida	4	6	4
7	(Argentina) N Kicker	6	3	6

Second round
1	(Brazil) JL Reis da Silva	6	6^{3}	2
(Argentina) GI Justo	4	7^{7}	6
(Argentina) JB Torres	5	6	4
(Brazil) D Dutra da Silva	7	2	6
(Brazil) M Alves	5	2
(Brazil) G Heide	7	6
(Argentina) G Villanueva	2	3
7	(Argentina) N Kicker	6	6

Quarterfinals
(Argentina) GI Justo	5	1
(Brazil) D Dutra da Silva	7	6
(Brazil) G Heide	6	5
7	(Argentina) N Kicker	2	1^{r}

Semifinals
(Brazil) D Dutra da Silva	2	2
(Brazil) G Heide	6	6

=== Bottom half ===
First round
8	(Argentina) A Collarini	6	6
LL	(Argentina) S de la Fuente	2	4
Q	(Argentina) Máximo Zeitune	7^{7}	6
WC	(Brazil) J Pereira	6^{4}	3
Alt	(Brazil) E Ribeiro	6	6
(Brazil) P Boscardin Dias	3	2
(Germany) C Negritu	4	7^{7}	6^{5}
3	(Argentina) F Díaz Acosta	6	6^{2}	7^{7}
5	(Bolivia) JC Prado Ángelo	6	6
Q	(Bolivia) F Zeballos	4	3
WC	(Brazil) Bruno Fernandez	6	6^{5}	6
Q	(Argentina) Valentín Basel	2	7^{7}	3
Q	(Brazil) O Luz	3	6	6
Q	(Argentina) Carlos María Zárate	6	2	4
(Brazil) P Sakamoto	4	7	6
2	(Argentina) GA Olivieri	6	5	1

Second round
8	(Argentina) A Collarini	6	6
Q	(Argentina) M Zeitune	1	3
Alt	(Brazil) E Ribeiro	3	6	6
3	(Argentina) F Díaz Acosta	6	4	4
5	(Bolivia) JC Prado Ángelo	7^{10}	6
WC	(Brazil) B Fernandez	6^{8}	3
Q	(Brazil) O Luz	4	6	5
(Brazil) P Sakamoto	6	4	7

Quarterfinals
8	(Argentina) A Collarini	6	7
Alt	(Brazil) E Ribeiro	2	5
5	(Bolivia) JC Prado Ángelo	6	7
(Brazil) P Sakamoto	4	5

Semifinals
8	(Argentina) A Collarini	6	6
5	(Bolivia) JC Prado Ángelo	4	3
