= San Diego Challenger =

San Diego Open 2
- 2026 San Diego Challenger

ATP Challenger Tour
- Event name: Tennis Warehouse Open
- Location: San Diego, United States
- Venue: Barnes Tennis Center
- Category: ATP Challenger Tour
- Surface: Hard
- Website: Website

The Tennis Warehouse Open or the San Diego Open 2 is a professional tennis tournament played on hardcourts. It is currently part of the ATP Challenger Tour. It was first held in San Diego, California, United States in 2026.

== Past finals ==
=== Singles ===
Year	Champion	Runner-up	Score
2026	(United States) Nishesh Basavareddy	(Brazil) Igor Marcondes	7–5, 6–4

=== Doubles ===
Year	Champions	Runners-up	Score
2026	(Netherlands) Stian Klaassen (United States) Christopher Papa	(United States) Vignesh Gogineni (United States) Noah Zamora	7–6^{(8–6)}, 5–7, [10–3]
