= 2023 Florianópolis Challenger =

- Date: 17–23 April
- Edition: 2nd
- Surface: Clay
- Location: Florianópolis, Brazil

Champions

Singles
- (Chile) Tomás Barrios Vera

Doubles
- (Brazil) Pedro Boscardin Dias / (Brazil) Gustavo Heide
- Florianópolis Challenger

The 2023 ENGIE Open de Tênis was a professional tennis tournament played on clay courts. It was the second edition of the tournament which was part of the 2023 ATP Challenger Tour. It took place in Florianópolis, Brazil from 17 to 23 April 2023.

== Singles main-draw entrants ==
=== Seeds ===
| Country | Player | Rank^{1} | Seed |
|---|---|---|---|
| CHI | Tomás Barrios Vera | 145 | 1 |
| CHI | Alejandro Tabilo | 161 | 2 |
| ITA | Luciano Darderi | 181 | 3 |
| ARG | Andrea Collarini | 194 | 4 |
| ARG | Genaro Alberto Olivieri | 223 | 5 |
| BRA | Thiago Seyboth Wild | 230 | 6 |
| ITA | Alessandro Giannessi | 252 | 7 |
| ARG | Francisco Comesaña | 255 | 8 |

- ^{1} Rankings are as of 10 April 2023.

=== Other entrants ===
The following players received wildcards into the singles main draw:

- (Brazil) Gustavo Ribeiro de Almeida
- (Brazil) João Fonseca
- (Brazil) Pedro Rodrigues

The following players received entry from the qualifying draw:

- (Uruguay) Ignacio Carou
- (Peru) Arklon Huertas del Pino
- (Argentina) Guido Iván Justo
- (Brazil) Wilson Leite
- (Brazil) Orlando Luz
- (Brazil) Pedro Sakamoto

== Champions ==
=== Singles ===
- (Chile) Tomás Barrios Vera def. (Chile) Alejandro Tabilo 6–4, 6–4.

=== Doubles ===
- (Brazil) Pedro Boscardin Dias / (Brazil) Gustavo Heide def. (Brazil) Christian Oliveira / (Brazil) Pedro Sakamoto 6–2, 7–5.
