= Stian Klaassen =

Dutch tennis player (born 2003)

- Country (sports): Netherlands
- Born: 19 April 2003 (age 23) Zeist, Netherlands
- Height: 1.85 m (6 ft 1 in)
- Plays: Right-handed (one-handed backhand)
- College: San Diego
- Coach: Ryan Keckley
- Prize money: US $12,528

Singles
- Career record: 0–0 (at ATP Tour level, Grand Slam level, and in Davis Cup)
- Career titles: 0
- Highest ranking: No. 1,068 (28 July 2025)
- Current ranking: No. 1,299 (19 October 2026)

Doubles
- Career record: 0–0 (at ATP Tour level, Grand Slam level, and in Davis Cup)
- Career titles: 1 Challenger, 3 ITF
- Highest ranking: No. 445 (19 October 2026)
- Current ranking: No. 445 (19 October 2026)
- Last updated on: 19 October 2026.

Stian Klaassen (born 19 April 2003) is a Dutch tennis player. He has a career high ATP singles ranking of No. 1,068 achieved on 28 July 2025 and a career high ATP doubles ranking of No. 445 achieved on 19 October 2026.

Klaassen has won one ATP Challenger doubles title at the 2026 San Diego Challenger.

Klaassen played college tennis at San Diego.
