= 2025 Engie Open Florianópolis =

- Date: 17–23 November
- Edition: 4th
- Category: ATP Challenger Tour
- Surface: Clay / Outdoor
- Location: Florianópolis, Brazil

Champions

Singles
- (Brazil) Gustavo Heide

Doubles
- (Bolivia) Boris Arias / (Denmark) Johannes Ingildsen
- Engie Open Florianópolis

The 2025 ENGIE Open Florianópolis was a professional tennis tournament played on outdoor clay courts. It was the fourth edition of the tournament, which was part of the 2025 ATP Challenger Tour. It took place in Florianópolis, Brazil, between 17 and 23 November 2025.

== Champions ==
=== Singles ===
- (Brazil) Gustavo Heide def. (Argentina) Andrea Collarini 6–2, 6–3.

=== Doubles ===
- (Bolivia) Boris Arias / (Denmark) Johannes Ingildsen def. (Peru) Alexander Merino / (Germany) Christoph Negritu 3–6, 6–3, [10–8].

== Singles main-draw entrants ==
=== Seeds ===
Country	Player	Rank^{1}	Seed
BRA	João Lucas Reis da Silva	187	1
ARG	Genaro Alberto Olivieri	221	2
ARG	Facundo Díaz Acosta	225	3
KAZ	Dmitry Popko	226	4
BOL	Juan Carlos Prado Ángelo	228	5
ARG	Santiago Rodríguez Taverna	234	6
ARG	Nicolás Kicker	264	7
ARG	Andrea Collarini	273	8

- ^{1} Rankings are as of 10 November 2025.

=== Other entrants ===
The following players received wildcards into the singles main draw:

- (Brazil) Bruno Fernandez
- (Brazil) José Pereira
- (Brazil) Leonardo Storck França

The following player received entry into the singles main draw through the Junior Accelerator programme:

- (Colombia) Miguel Tobón

The following players received entry into the singles main draw as alternates:

- (United States) Bruno Kuzuhara
- (Brazil) Eduardo Ribeiro
- (Brazil) João Eduardo Schiessl

The following players received entry from the qualifying draw:

- (Argentina) Valentín Basel
- (Brazil) Orlando Luz
- (Brazil) Nicolas Zanellato
- (Argentina) Carlos María Zárate
- (Bolivia) Federico Zeballos
- (Argentina) Máximo Zeitune

The following player received entry as a lucky loser:

- (Argentina) Santiago de la Fuente
