= Carlos Sánchez Jover =

Spanish tennis player (born 2000)

- Country (sports): Spain
- Born: 21 July 2000 (age 26)
- Height: 1.73 m (5 ft 8 in)
- Plays: Left-handed (two-handed backhand)
- Prize money: US $230,807

Singles
- Career record: 0–0
- Career titles: 8 ITF
- Highest ranking: No. 260 (31 March 2025)
- Current ranking: No. 336 (14 September 2026)

Doubles
- Career record: 0–0
- Career titles: 1 Challenger, 5 ITF
- Highest ranking: No. 333 (20 May 2024)
- Current ranking: No. 560 (14 September 2026)
- Last updated on: 16 September 2026.

Carlos Sánchez Jover (born 21 July 2000) is a Spanish tennis player. He has a career high ATP singles ranking of world No. 260 achieved on 31 March 2025 and a career high ATP doubles ranking of No. 333 achieved on 20 May 2024.

== Career ==
Sánchez Jover has won 1 ATP Challenger doubles title at the 2024 Engie Open Florianópolis with Daniel Cukierman.

== ATP Challenger and ITF Tour finals ==
=== Singles: 13 (8–5) ===
Legend (singles) ATP Challenger Tour (0–0) Futures/ITF World Tennis Tour (8–5)	Finals by surface Hard (0–1) Clay (8–4)

Result	W–L	Date	Tournament	Tier	Surface	Opponent	Score
Loss	0–1	Nov 2020	M15 Cairo, Egypt	World Tennis Tour	Clay	(Switzerland) Johan Nikles	1–6, 7–5, 3–6
Loss	0–2	Mar 2021	M15 Monastir, Tunisia	World Tennis Tour	Hard	(Japan) Renta Tokuda	5–7, 7–5, 4–6
Win	1–2	Jun 2021	M15 Cairo, Egypt	World Tennis Tour	Clay	(Argentina) Juan Pablo Paz	6–3, 6–0
Win	2–2	Oct 2021	M15 Platja D'Aro, Spain	World Tennis Tour	Clay	(France) Maxime Chazal	6–3, 6–3
Loss	2–3	Aug 2022	M25 Oviedo, Spain	World Tennis Tour	Clay	(Spain) Javier Barranco Cosano	5–7, 5–7
Loss	2–4	May 2023	M25 La Nucia, Spain	World Tennis Tour	Clay	(Russia) Alibek Kachmazov	3–6, 1–6
Loss	2–5	Apr 2024	M25 Santa Margherita Di Pula, Italy	World Tennis Tour	Clay	(United Kingdom) Jay Clarke	6–7^{[4-7]}, 6–3, 4–6
Win	3–5	Jul 2024	M25 Gandía, Spain	World Tennis Tour	Clay	(Italy) Raul Brancaccio	3–6, 6–2, 7–5
Win	4–5	Aug 2024	M25 Montesilvano, Italy	World Tennis Tour	Clay	(Italy) Gabriele Pennaforti	6–4, 6–3
Win	5–5	Sep 2024	M25 Santa Margherita Di Pula, Italy	World Tennis Tour	Clay	(Ukraine) Oleksandr Ovcharenko	7–5, 6–2
Win	6–5	Jan 2025	M15 Antalya, Turkey	World Tennis Tour	Clay	(Switzerland) Kilian Feldbausch	6–3, 7–6 ^{8–6}
Win	7–5	Jan 2025	M15 Antalya, Turkey	World Tennis Tour	Clay	(Czech Republic) Dominik Kellovsky	6–4, 7–5
Win	8–5	Feb 2025	M15 Valencia, Spain	World Tennis Tour	Clay	(Spain) Max Alcalá Gurri	2–4^{[w/o]}
