= Florianópolis Challenger =

Engie Open
- 2025 Engie Open Florianópolis

Tournament information
- Event name: Engie Open Florianópolis
- Founded: 2021
- Location: Florianópolis, Brazil
- Venue: Lagoa Iate Clube
- Surface: Clay
ATP Tour
- Category: ATP Challenger Tour
- Draw: 32S/17Q/16D
- Prize money: $100,000 (2025), $82,000 (2024)
WTA Tour
- Category: ITF Women's World Tennis Tour (2024)
- Draw: 32S/32Q/16D
- Prize money: $60,000

The Engie Open is a professional tennis tournament played on clay courts. It is currently part of the ATP Challenger Tour. It is held in Florianópolis, Brazil. It was also part of the ITF Women's World Tennis Tour in 2024.

== Past finals ==
=== Men's singles ===
Year	Champion	Runner-up	Score
2025	(Brazil) Gustavo Heide	(Argentina) Andrea Collarini	6–2, 6–3
2024	(France) Enzo Couacaud	(Brazil) João Lucas Reis da Silva	3–6, 6–4, 7–6^{(7–1)}
2023	(Chile) Tomás Barrios Vera	(Chile) Alejandro Tabilo	6–4, 6–4
2022	Not held		
2021	(Brazil) Igor Marcondes	(Bolivia) Hugo Dellien	6–2, 6–4

=== Men's doubles ===
Year	Champions	Runners-up	Score
2025	(Bolivia) Boris Arias (Denmark) Johannes Ingildsen	(Peru) Alexander Merino (Germany) Christoph Negritu	3–6, 6–3, [10–8]
2024	(Israel) Daniel Cukierman (Spain) Carlos Sánchez Jover	(Argentina) Lorenzo Joaquín Rodríguez (Uruguay) Franco Roncadelli	6–0, 3–6, [10–4]
2023	(Brazil) Pedro Boscardin Dias (Brazil) Gustavo Heide	(Brazil) Christian Oliveira (Brazil) Pedro Sakamoto	6–2, 7–5
2022	Not held		
2021	(Colombia) Nicolás Barrientos (Colombia) Alejandro Gómez	(Uruguay) Martín Cuevas (Brazil) Rafael Matos	6–3, 6–3

=== Women's singles ===
Year	Champion	Runner-up	Score
2024	(Cyprus) Raluca Șerban	(France) Séléna Janicijevic	7–5, 6–2

=== Women's doubles ===
Year	Champions	Runners-up	Score
2024	Maria Kononova; Maria Kozyreva	(Serbia) Katarina Jokić (Brazil) Rebeca Pereira	6–4, 6–3
