= Gustavo Heide =

Brazilian tennis player (born 2002)

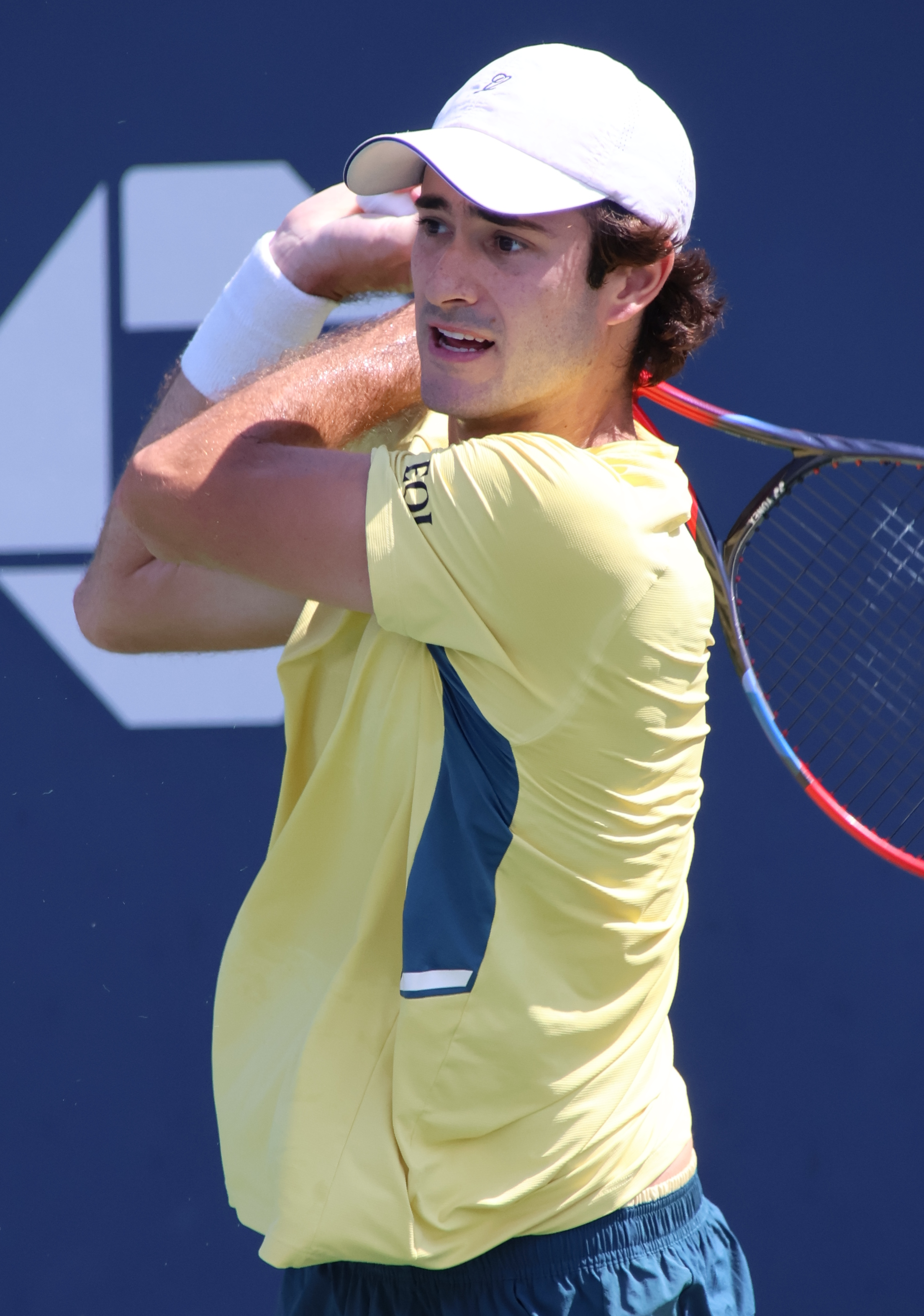
- Heide at the 2026 US Open
- Country (sports): Brazil
- Born: 28 February 2002 (age 24) São Paulo, Brazil
- Height: 1.91 m (6 ft 3 in)
- Plays: Right-handed (two-handed backhand)
- Coach: Arthur Rabelo
- Prize money: US $753,245

Singles
- Career record: 6–9
- Career titles: 0
- Highest ranking: No. 112 (2 November 2026)
- Current ranking: No. 119 (16 November 2026)

Grand Slam singles results
- Australian Open: Q2 (2026)
- French Open: 1R (2024)
- Wimbledon: Q2 (2026)
- US Open: Q1 (2024, 2026)

Doubles
- Career record: 1–1
- Career titles: 0
- Highest ranking: No. 197 (2 October 2023)
- Current ranking: No. 271 (2 November 2026)
Medal record
Men's tennis
Representing Brazil
Pan American Games
Gold medal – first place	2023 Santiago	Doubles
South American Games
Gold medal – first place	2022 Asunción	Doubles
Silver medal – second place	2022 Asunción	Singles
- Last updated on: 20 November 2026.

Gustavo Heide (born 28 February 2002) is a Brazilian professional tennis player. He has a career-high ATP singles ranking of No. 112 achieved on 2 November 2026 and a doubles ranking of No. 197 achieved on 2 October 2023. He is currently the No. 2 singles player from Brazil.

== Career ==
=== 2020: Juniors ===
Heide had good results on the ITF junior circuit, with a 79–26 singles win-loss record and reached an ITF junior combined ranking of No. 16 on 24 February 2020.

=== 2023: First Challenger singles final, Top 250 ===
Heide made it into his first singles Challenger final at the 2023 Open Bogotá but withdrew before the match handing the title to Thiago Agustin Tirante. Despite this, he reached the top 250 climbing more than 50 positions up in the rankings on 2 October 2023.

At the 2023 Pan American Games, Heide almost won a medal in singles, despite being only No. 252 in the world. He reached the semifinals, where he faced the tournament's top seed Facundo Díaz Acosta, ranked No. 109 in the world, and had match-point to close the game, but ended up losing in the tiebreak of the last set. In the bronze medal match, against compatriot Thiago Monteiro, he also lost in the last set tiebreak. In doubles, Heide, playing with Marcelo Demoliner, overcame the pro-Chilean crowd and took gold.

At the Montevideo Challenger, Heide reached the semifinals, losing again to Acosta. At the end of 2023, For winning the IV Maria Esther Bueno Cup, Heide earned an invitation to compete in the ATP 500 in Rio de Janeiro, in February 2024.

=== 2024: ATP, Major and top 150 debuts, Challenger singles title ===
Heide participated in the tie between Brazil and Sweden for the Davis Cup World Qualifier, in February 2024.

At the ATP 500 tournament in Rio de Janeiro, he made his ATP debut as a wildcard, where he faced Chilean Tomás Barrios Vera but lost in the first round.

In March, Heide reached the semifinals of the Challenger in Santiago and soon after, at the inaugural Challenger in Asunción, Paraguay, he reached the final, defeating world No. 95 and top seed Juan Pablo Varillas. He won the championship match, lifting his maiden title by defeating his compatriot João Fonseca and made his top 200 debut at world No. 159 on 10 June 2024, moving more than 50 positions up in the rankings.

Ranked No. 174 at the time, Heide qualified for his first Grand Slam at the 2024 French Open after defeating Lukáš Klein, Bu Yunchaokete, and Matteo Gigante in the qualifying competition.

== ATP Challenger Tour finals ==
=== Singles: 7 (4 titles, 3 runner-ups) ===
Finals by surface
Hard (–)
Clay (4–3)

Result	W–L	Date	Tournament	Tier	Surface	Opponent	Score
Loss	0–1	Sep 2023	Open de Bogotá, Colombia	Challenger	Clay	(Argentina) Thiago Agustín Tirante	walkover
Win	1–1	Mar 2024	Paraguay Open, Paraguay	Challenger	Clay	(Brazil) João Fonseca	7–5, 6–7^{(6–8)}, 6–1
Win	2–1	Nov 2025	Engie Open Florianópolis, Brazil	Challenger	Clay	(Argentina) Andrea Collarini	6–2, 6–3
Win	3–1	Apr 2026	Internacional de Campinas, Brazil	Challenger	Clay	(Peru) Gonzalo Bueno	6–2, 7-5
Loss	3–2	May 2026	Abruzzo Open Francavilla al Mare, Italy	Challenger	Clay	(Argentina) Facundo Díaz Acosta	7–5 1–6 2–6
Win	4–2	Jun 2026	Poznań Open, Poland	Challenger	Clay	(Argentina) Facundo Díaz Acosta	6–2, 6–2
Loss	4–3	Sep 2026	Curitiba, Brazil	Challenger	Clay	(Argentina) Guido Iván Justo	1–6, 4–6

=== Doubles: 6 (5 titles, 1 runner-up) ===
Finals by surface
Hard (–)
Clay (5–1)

Result	W–L	Date	Tournament	Tier	Surface	Partner	Opponents	Score
Win	1–0	Nov 2021	Aberto da República, Brazil	Challenger	Clay	(Brazil) Mateus Alves	(Italy) Luciano Darderi (Argentina) Genaro Alberto Olivieri	6–3, 6–3
Win	2–0	Apr 2023	Florianópolis Challenger, Brazil	Challenger	Clay	(Brazil) Pedro Boscardin Dias	(Brazil) Christian Oliveira (Brazil) Pedro Sakamoto	6–2, 7–5
Win	3–0	Aug 2023	RD Open, Dominican Republic	Challenger	Clay	(Brazil) Pedro Boscardin Dias	(Ecuador) Diego Hidalgo (Colombia) Cristian Rodríguez	6–4, 7–5
Loss	3–1	Nov 2024	Lima Challenger II, Peru	Challenger	Clay	(Brazil) Luís Britto	(Poland) Karol Drzewiecki (Poland) Piotr Matuszewski	5–7, 4–6
Win	4–1	Jan 2025	Punta Open, Uruguay	Challenger	Clay	(Brazil) João Lucas Reis da Silva	(Argentina) Facundo Mena (Argentina) Marco Trungelliti	6–2, 6–3
Win	5–1	Mar 2026	LA Open, Brazil	Challenger	Clay	(Brazil) Guto Miguel	(Brazil) Felipe Meligeni Alves (Brazil) João Lucas Reis da Silva	6–4, 6–2

== ITF Tour finals ==
=== Singles: 11 (7 titles, 4 runner-ups) ===
Finals by surface
Hard (0–1)
Clay (7–3)

Result	W–L	Date	Tournament	Tier	Surface	Opponent	Score
Win	1–0	Sep 2021	M15 Ibagué, Colombia	WTT	Clay	(Colombia) Alejandro Gómez	7–6^{(10–8)}, 7–5
Win	2–0	Sep 2021	M15 Recife, Brazil	WTT	Clay (i)	(Brazil) José Pereira	6–4, 6–2
Loss	2–1	Oct 2021	M25 Rio do Sul, Brazil	WTT	Clay	(Brazil) Pedro Boscardin Dias	6–7^{(4–7)}, 4–6
Win	3–1	Nov 2021	M15 Brasília, Brazil	WTT	Clay	(Brazil) Oscar José Gutierrez	2–6, 6–0, 6–4
Win	4–1	Oct 2022	M25 Ibagué, Colombia	WTT	Clay	(Chile) Gonzalo Lama	6–3, 7–5
Loss	4–2	Oct 2022	M15 Manizales, Colombia	WTT	Clay	(Peru) Jorge Panta	1–6, 6–3, 6–7^{(3–7)}
Win	5–2	Nov 2022	M25 Salta, Argentina	WTT	Clay	(Chile) Gonzalo Lama	6–4, 6–4
Win	6–2	Aug 2023	M25 Trujillo, Peru	WTT	Clay	(Argentina) Juan Pablo Ficovich	6–3, 6–0
Loss	6–3	Sep 2025	M25 Londrina, Brazil	WTT	Clay	(Paraguay) Daniel Vallejo	4–6, 6–4, 3–6
Loss	6–4	Sep 2025	M25 Barueri, Brazil	WTT	Hard	(Ecuador) Andrés Andrade	4–6, 3–6
Win	7–4	Nov 2025	M25 Lajeado, Brazil	WTT	Clay	(Argentina) Santiago Rodríguez Taverna	6–1, 6–4

=== Doubles: 7 (3 titles, 4 runner-ups) ===
Finals by surface
Hard (–)
Clay (3–4)

Result	W–L	Date	Tournament	Tier	Surface	Partner	Opponents	Score
Loss	0–1	Sep 2021	M25 Medellín, Colombia	WTT	Clay	(Brazil) Pedro Boscardin Dias	(Brazil) Gilbert Klier Jr. (Brazil) João Lucas Reis da Silva	4–6, 6–4, [8–10]
Win	1–1	Sep 2021	M15 Recife, Brazil	WTT	Clay (i)	(Brazil) Pedro Boscardin Dias	(Brazil) Daniel Dutra da Silva (Brazil) Marcelo Zormann	7–6^{(7–1)}, 3–6, [10–8]
Loss	1–2	Oct 2021	M25 Rio do Sul, Brazil	WTT	Clay	(Brazil) Pedro Boscardin Dias	(Brazil) Daniel Dutra da Silva (Brazil) Igor Marcondes	4–6, 3–6
Win	2–2	Nov 2021	M25 Aparecida de Goiânia, Brazil	WTT	Clay	(Brazil) Daniel Dutra da Silva	(Colombia) Alejandro González (Argentina) Matías Zukas	6–3, 6–3
Loss	2–3	Oct 2022	M25 Ibagué, Colombia	WTT	Clay	(Brazil) João Victor Couto Loureiro	(Peru) Arklon Huertas del Pino (Peru) Conner Huertas del Pino	2–6, 6–7^{(6–8)}
Loss	2–4	Nov 2022	M25 Lajeado, Brazil	WTT	Clay	(Brazil) João Victor Couto Loureiro	(Brazil) Marcelo Zormann (Brazil) Orlando Luz	3–6, 2–6
Win	3–4	Dec 2022	M25 Vacaria, Brazil	WTT	Clay	(Brazil) João Victor Couto Loureiro	(Brazil) Igor Gimenez (Kazakhstan) Grigoriy Lomakin	3–6, 7–6^{(7–5)}, [10–5]
