= Igor Marcondes =

Brazilian tennis player

- Full name: Igor Ribeiro Marcondes
- Country (sports): Brazil
- Residence: Itajaí, Brazil
- Born: 16 June 1997 (age 29) Caraguatatuba, Brazil
- Height: 1.83 m (6 ft 0 in)
- Plays: Left-handed (two-handed backhand)
- Coach: Patrício Arnold, Luiz Peniza
- Prize money: US $141,484

Singles
- Career record: 0–1 (at ATP Tour level, Grand Slam level, and in Davis Cup)
- Career titles: 2 Challenger
- Highest ranking: No. 258 (21 March 2022)
- Current ranking: No. 292 (16 November 2026)

Doubles
- Career record: 0–1 (at ATP Tour level, Grand Slam level, and in Davis Cup)
- Career titles: 6 ITF
- Highest ranking: No. 206 (14 September 2026)
- Current ranking: No. 227 (5 October 2026)
- Last updated on: 20 November 2026.

Igor Ribeiro Marcondes (born 16 June 1997) is a Brazilian tennis player. He has a career high ATP singles ranking of world No. 258 achieved on 21 March 2022 and a doubles ranking of No. 206 achieved on 14 September 2026.

== Career ==
Marcondes made his ATP main draw debut at the 2019 Brasil Open in the doubles draw partnering Rafael Matos.

In 2018, Mercondes served a nine-month ban for unintentional use of hydrochlorothiazide.

In 2022, he won his second ATP Challenger title at home in Blumenau, Brazil. Following the title, he was issued with a three-year ban for missing three anti-doping tests between 2021 and 2022, returning to competition in March 2025. In October the same year, he won back-to-back M15 ITF titles in Hua Hin. As a result he returned to the top 500 in the singles rankings on 10 November 2025.

== ATP Challenger and ITF Tour finals ==
=== Singles: 10 (5–5) ===
Legend (singles) ATP Challenger Tour (2–1) ITF Futures Tour (3–4)	Titles by surface Hard (3–3) Clay (2–2)

Result	W–L	Date	Tournament	Tier	Surface	Opponent	Score
Loss	0–1	Apr 2021	Tunisia M15, Monastir	Futures	Hard	(Germany) Christoph Negritu	2–6, 2–6
Loss	0–2	Jun 2021	Dominican Republic M25, Santo Domingo	Futures	Hard	(Argentina) Nicolás Kicker	7–6^{(7–5)}, 1–6, 6–7^{(2–7)}
Win	1–2	Dec 2021	Florianópolis, Brazil	Challenger	Clay	(Bolivia) Hugo Dellien	6–2, 6–4
Win	2–2	Jan 2022	Blumenau, Brazil	Challenger	Clay	(Argentina) Juan Bautista Torres	3–6, 7–5, 6–1
Win	3–2	May 2025	M15 Monastir, Tunisia	WTT	Hard	Maxim Zhukov	6–3, 6–1
Loss	3–3	Jun 2025	M15 Kuršumlijska Banja, Serbia	WTT	Clay	(Serbia) Stefan Popovic	1–6, 1–6
Loss	3–4	Sep 2025	M25 Cuiaba, Brazil	WTT	Clay	(Brazil) Mateus Alves	6–4, 1–6, 3–6
Win	4–4	Oct 2025	M15 Hua Hin, Thailand	WTT	Hard	(France) Arthur Weber	7–5, 7–5
Win	5–4	Nov 2025	M15 Hua Hin, Thailand	WTT	Hard	(France) Arthur Weber	6–1, 6–1
Loss	5–5	Sep 2026	San Diego, United States	Challenger	Hard	(United States) Nishesh Basavareddy	5–7, 4–6
