= 2023 Antofagasta Challenger – Doubles =

Doubles
- 2023 Antofagasta Challenger

Final
- Champions: (Bolivia) Boris Arias (Bolivia) Federico Zeballos
- Runners-up: (Italy) Luciano Darderi (Bolivia) Murkel Dellien
- Score: 5–7, 6–4, [10–8]

Events
Singles	Doubles
Antofagasta Challenger	· 2024 →

This was the first edition of the tournament.

Boris Arias and Federico Zeballos won the title after defeating Luciano Darderi and Murkel Dellien 5–7, 6–4, [10–8] in the final.

== Seeds ==
1. (Ecuador) Diego Hidalgo / (Colombia) Cristian Rodríguez (first round)
2. (Bolivia) Boris Arias / (Bolivia) Federico Zeballos (champions)
3. (Brazil) Fernando Romboli / (Brazil) Marcelo Zormann (semifinals)
4. (Argentina) Guillermo Durán / (Brazil) Orlando Luz (semifinals)

== Draw ==
=== Key ===
- Q = Qualifier
- WC = Wild card
- LL = Lucky loser
- Alt = Alternate
- SE = Special exempt
- PR = Protected ranking
- ITF = ITF entry
- JE = Junior exempt
- w/o = Walkover
- r = Retired
- d = Defaulted
- SR = Special ranking

First round
1	(Ecuador) D Hidalgo (Colombia) C Rodríguez	6	4	[3]
(Italy) L Darderi (Bolivia) M Dellien	2	6	[10]
(Brazil) P Boscardin Dias (Brazil) G Heide	6	6
(Switzerland) L Margaroli (Argentina) S Rodríguez Taverna	4	4
4	(Argentina) G Durán (Brazil) O Luz	3	7	[10]
(Argentina) Ignacio Monzón (Argentina) G Villanueva	6	5	[6]
(Argentina) Leonardo Aboian (Argentina) Tomás Farjat	6	6
WC	(Chile) Ignacio Becerra (Chile) Miguel Ángel Cabrera	2	2
Alt	(Brazil) M Alves (Brazil) E Ribeiro	3	4
(Norway) V Durasovic (Spain) D Jordà Sanchis	6	6
WC	(Chile) M Soto (Paraguay) AD Vallejo	4	1
3	(Brazil) F Romboli (Brazil) M Zormann	6	6
(Brazil) M Pucinelli de Almeida (Brazil) JL Reis da Silva	6	6
(Argentina) A Collarini (Argentina) R Olivo	1	2
(Argentina) Juan Bautista Otegui (Argentina) C Ugo Carabelli	5	4
2	(Bolivia) B Arias (Bolivia) F Zeballos	7	6

Quarterfinals
(Italy) L Darderi (Bolivia) M Dellien	w/o
(Brazil) P Boscardin Dias (Brazil) G Heide
4	(Argentina) G Durán (Brazil) O Luz	6	6
(Argentina) L Aboian (Argentina) T Farjat	2	2
(Norway) V Durasovic (Spain) D Jordà Sanchis	7^{7}	3	[4]
3	(Brazil) F Romboli (Brazil) M Zormann	6^{4}	6	[10]
(Brazil) M Pucinelli de Almeida (Brazil) JL Reis da Silva	3	2
2	(Bolivia) B Arias (Bolivia) F Zeballos	6	6

Semifinals
(Italy) L Darderi (Bolivia) M Dellien	6	6
4	(Argentina) G Durán (Brazil) O Luz	4	3
3	(Brazil) F Romboli (Brazil) M Zormann	6	6^{4}	[8]
2	(Bolivia) B Arias (Bolivia) F Zeballos	3	7^{7}	[10]

Final
(Italy) L Darderi (Bolivia) M Dellien	7	4	[8]
2	(Bolivia) B Arias (Bolivia) F Zeballos	5	6	[10]
