= 2023 Antofagasta Challenger – Singles =

Singles
- 2023 Antofagasta Challenger

Final
- Champion: (Argentina) Camilo Ugo Carabelli
- Runner-up: (United States) Tristan Boyer
- Score: 3–6, 6–1, 7–5

Events
Singles	Doubles
Antofagasta Challenger	· 2024 →

This was the first edition of the tournament.

Camilo Ugo Carabelli won the title after defeating Tristan Boyer 3–6, 6–1, 7–5 in the final.

== Seeds ==
1. (Argentina) Juan Manuel Cerúndolo (second round)
2. (Chile) Tomás Barrios Vera (first round)
3. (Chile) Alejandro Tabilo (first round)
4. (Argentina) Genaro Alberto Olivieri (first round)
5. (Bolivia) Hugo Dellien (second round)
6. (Argentina) Facundo Bagnis (second round, retired)
7. (Argentina) Francisco Comesaña (quarterfinals)
8. (Italy) Luciano Darderi (semifinals)

== Draw ==
=== Key ===
- Q = Qualifier
- WC = Wild card
- LL = Lucky loser
- Alt = Alternate
- SE = Special exempt
- PR = Protected ranking
- ITF = ITF entry
- JE = Junior exempt
- w/o = Walkover
- r = Retired
- d = Defaulted
- SR = Special ranking

=== Finals ===
Semifinals
(Argentina) Camilo Ugo Carabelli	6	6
(Argentina) Román Andrés Burruchaga	4	4
Alt	(United States) Tristan Boyer	6	7
8	(Italy) Luciano Darderi	3	5

Final
(Argentina) Camilo Ugo Carabelli	3	6	7
Alt	(United States) Tristan Boyer	6	1	5

=== Top half ===
First round
1	(Argentina) JM Cerúndolo	6	6
Alt	(Norway) V Durasovic	3	3
Q	(Argentina) Tomás Farjat	1	0
(Argentina) C Ugo Carabelli	6	6
(Brazil) M Pucinelli de Almeida	6	2	6
(Paraguay) AD Vallejo	2	6	1
Q	(Argentina) Ignacio Monzón	6	1	3
6	(Argentina) F Bagnis	4	6	6
4	(Argentina) GA Olivieri	7^{8}	4	4
Q	(Argentina) F Mena	6^{6}	6	6
(Argentina) RA Burruchaga	1	6	4
(Argentina) S Rodríguez Taverna	6	4	1^{r}
(Bolivia) M Dellien	6	6
(Argentina) R Olivo	3	3
Q	(Brazil) P Sakamoto	6	5	4
7	(Argentina) F Comesaña	0	7	6

Second round
1	(Argentina) JM Cerúndolo	6^{5}	6	2
(Argentina) C Ugo Carabelli	7^{7}	3	6
(Brazil) M Pucinelli de Almeida	4	6	2
6	(Argentina) F Bagnis	6	0	0^{r}
Q	(Argentina) F Mena	4	6	3
(Argentina) RA Burruchaga	6	1	6
(Bolivia) M Dellien	4	6^{3}
7	(Argentina) F Comesaña	6	7^{7}

Quarterfinals
(Argentina) C Ugo Carabelli	7^{7}	6
(Brazil) M Pucinelli de Almeida	6^{5}	2
(Argentina) RA Burruchaga	6	6
7	(Argentina) F Comesaña	3	4

Semifinals
(Argentina) C Ugo Carabelli	6	6
(Argentina) RA Burruchaga	4	4

=== Bottom half ===
First round
5	(Bolivia) H Dellien	6	6
Q	(Brazil) Gilbert Klier Júnior	2	0
(Argentina) A Collarini	6^{5}	2
(Brazil) JL Reis da Silva	7^{7}	6
(Argentina) M Navone	3	6^{5}
(Brazil) G Heide	6	7^{7}
Alt	(United States) T Boyer	6	1	7^{11}
3	(Chile) A Tabilo	3	6	6^{9}
8	(Italy) L Darderi	6	7^{7}
WC	(Chile) M Soto	3	6^{4}
Alt	(Brazil) E Ribeiro	6	6
WC	(Bolivia) JC Prado Ángelo	3	4
(France) M Janvier	4	6	6^{6}
WC	(Chile) G Lama	6	1	7^{8}
Q	(Brazil) P Boscardin Dias	6	6
2	(Chile) T Barrios Vera	1	1

Second round
5	(Bolivia) H Dellien	6	6^{4}	5
(Brazil) JL Reis da Silva	3	7^{7}	7
(Brazil) G Heide	4	6	4
Alt	(United States) T Boyer	6	3	6
8	(Italy) L Darderi	6	6
Alt	(Brazil) E Ribeiro	3	2
WC	(Chile) G Lama	6	7^{7}
Q	(Brazil) P Boscardin Dias	1	6^{3}

Quarterfinals
(Brazil) JL Reis da Silva	6^{6}	2
Alt	(United States) T Boyer	7^{8}	6
8	(Italy) L Darderi	6	6
WC	(Chile) G Lama	1	3

Semifinals
Alt	(United States) T Boyer	6	7
8	(Italy) L Darderi	3	5
