= 2026 Antofagasta Challenger – Doubles =

Doubles
- 2026 Antofagasta Challenger

Final
- Champions: (Brazil) Eduardo Ribeiro (Brazil) Marcelo Zormann
- Runners-up: (Mexico) Alan Magadán (Peru) Alexander Merino
- Score: 6–1, 6–3

Events
Singles	Doubles
- Antofagasta Challenger

Gonzalo Escobar and Miguel Ángel Reyes-Varela were the defending champions but chose not to defend their title.

Eduardo Ribeiro and Marcelo Zormann won the title after deafeting Alan Magadán and Alexander Merino 6–1, 6–3 in the final.

== Seeds ==
1. (Brazil) Eduardo Ribeiro / (Brazil) Marcelo Zormann (champions)
2. (Bolivia) Boris Arias / (Uruguay) Ignacio Carou (first round)
3. (Mexico) Alan Magadán / (Peru) Alexander Merino (final)
4. (Brazil) João Victor Couto Loureiro / (Argentina) Franco Ribero (semifinals)

== Draw ==
Key

- Q = Qualifier
- WC = Wild card
- LL = Lucky loser
- Alt = Alternate
- ITF = ITF entry
- PR = Protected ranking
- SR = Special ranking
- SE = Special exempt
- JE = Junior exempt
- JR = Junior Accelerator Programme entrant
- CO = College Accelerator Programme entrant
- NG = Next Gen Accelerator Program entrant
- w/o = Walkover
- r = Retired
- d = Defaulted

First round
1	(Brazil) E Ribeiro (Brazil) M Zormann	4	6	[10]
WC	(Chile) Anders Matta (Argentina) Lorenzo Joaquín Rodríguez	6	0	[8]
PR	(Brazil) F Meligeni Alves (Brazil) M Pucinelli de Almeida	6	6
WC	(United States) Milledge Cossu (Chile) Bautista de la Peña	1	2
4	(Brazil) JVC Loureiro (Argentina) F Ribero	6	6
Alt	(Brazil) Wilson Leite (Brazil) J Pereira	2	2
(Argentina) V Aboian (Peru) A Huertas del Pino	6	3	[4]
(Argentina) H Casanova (Argentina) G Villanueva	3	6	[10]
(Bolivia) M Dellien (Uruguay) F Roncadelli	6	6
(Argentina) Juan Estévez (Argentina) Lucio Ratti	3	2
(Brazil) M Alves (Brazil) L Britto	4	5
3	(Mexico) A Magadán (Peru) A Merino	6	7
(Brazil) Bruno Oliveira (Brazil) Natan Rodrigues	4	4
(Uruguay) J Aguilar Cardozo (Argentina) A Barrena	6	6
Alt	(Argentina) Thiago Cigarrán (Argentina) S de la Fuente	6	6
2	(Bolivia) B Arias (Uruguay) I Carou	4	2

Quarterfinals
1	(Brazil) E Ribeiro (Brazil) M Zormann	w/o
PR	(Brazil) F Meligeni Alves (Brazil) M Pucinelli de Almeida
4	(Brazil) JVC Loureiro (Argentina) F Ribero	7^{7}	6
(Argentina) H Casanova (Argentina) G Villanueva	6^{4}	4
(Bolivia) M Dellien (Uruguay) F Roncadelli	3	6^{7}
3	(Mexico) A Magadán (Peru) A Merino	6	7^{9}
(Uruguay) J Aguilar Cardozo (Argentina) A Barrena
Alt	(Argentina) T Cigarrán (Argentina) S de la Fuente	w/o

Semifinals
1	(Brazil) E Ribeiro (Brazil) M Zormann	7^{7}	6
4	(Brazil) JVC Loureiro (Argentina) F Ribero	6^{5}	3
3	(Mexico) A Magadán (Peru) A Merino	6	7^{8}
Alt	(Argentina) T Cigarrán (Argentina) S de la Fuente	3	6^{6}

Final
1	(Brazil) E Ribeiro (Brazil) M Zormann	6	6
3	(Mexico) A Magadán (Peru) A Merino	1	3
