= 2026 Itajaí Open – Singles =

Singles
- 2026 Itajaí Open

Final
- Champion: (Paraguay) Daniel Vallejo
- Runner-up: (Brazil) Thiago Seyboth Wild
- Score: 7–5, 4–6, 6–2

Events
Singles	Doubles
- Itajaí Open

This was the first edition of the tournament.

Daniel Vallejo won the title after defeating Thiago Seyboth Wild 7–5, 4–6, 6–2 in the final.

== Seeds ==
1. (Bolivia) Hugo Dellien (second round)
2. (Paraguay) Daniel Vallejo (champion)
3. (Argentina) Alex Barrena (semifinals)
4. (Ecuador) Álvaro Guillén Meza (second round)
5. (Brazil) Thiago Monteiro (quarterfinals)
6. (Brazil) João Lucas Reis da Silva (first round)
7. (Peru) Gonzalo Bueno (quarterfinals)
8. (Brazil) Thiago Seyboth Wild (final)

== Draw ==
Key

- Q = Qualifier
- WC = Wild card
- LL = Lucky loser
- Alt = Alternate
- ITF = ITF entry
- PR = Protected ranking
- SR = Special ranking
- SE = Special exempt
- JE = Junior exempt
- JR = Junior Accelerator Programme entrant
- CO = College Accelerator Programme entrant
- NG = Next Gen Accelerator Program entrant
- w/o = Walkover
- r = Retired
- d = Defaulted

=== Finals ===
Semifinals
8	(Brazil) Thiago Seyboth Wild	6	6
3	(Argentina) Alex Barrena	1	0
(Spain) Nikolás Sánchez Izquierdo	4	1
2	(Paraguay) Daniel Vallejo	6	6

Final
8	(Brazil) Thiago Seyboth Wild	5	6	2
2	(Paraguay) Daniel Vallejo	7	4	6

=== Top half ===
First round
1	(Bolivia) H Dellien	6	4	7^{9}
(Brazil) M Pucinelli de Almeida	4	6	6^{7}
WC	(Brazil) I Marcondes	6	6
(Brazil) F Meligeni Alves	1	2
(Brazil) P Boscardin Dias	6^{2}	2
(Argentina) GA Olivieri	7^{7}	6
(Argentina) L Midón	3	4
8	(Brazil) T Seyboth Wild	6	6
3	(Argentina) A Barrena	6	6
(Argentina) G Villanueva	4	2
(Romania) GA Boitan	1	6	6
(Argentina) A Collarini	6	2	3
Q	(Argentina) GI Justo	7^{7}	6
Q	(Argentina) JB Torres	6^{4}	2
Q	(Brazil) M Alves	6	2	2
7	(Peru) G Bueno	4	6	6

Second round
1	(Bolivia) H Dellien	4	2
WC	(Brazil) I Marcondes	6	6
(Argentina) GA Olivieri	5	2
8	(Brazil) T Seyboth Wild	7	6
3	(Argentina) A Barrena	6	7
(Romania) GA Boitan	4	5
Q	(Argentina) GI Justo	3	6	2
7	(Peru) G Bueno	6	0	6

Quarterfinals
WC	(Brazil) I Marcondes	2	4
8	(Brazil) T Seyboth Wild	6	6
3	(Argentina) A Barrena	6	6
7	(Peru) G Bueno	4	3

Semifinals
8	(Brazil) T Seyboth Wild	6	6
3	(Argentina) A Barrena	1	0

=== Bottom half ===
First round
6	(Brazil) JL Reis da Silva	4	2
(Spain) N Sánchez Izquierdo	6	6
Q	(Argentina) JM La Serna	6	7
(Brazil) D Dutra da Silva	0	5
Q	(Romania) Ștefan Paloși	6	2	6
(Bolivia) M Dellien	2	6	4
(Argentina) N Kicker	3	2
4	(Ecuador) Á Guillén Meza	6	6
5	(Brazil) T Monteiro	6	6
WC	(Brazil) João Eduardo Schiessl	2	2
(Peru) JP Varillas	6^{5}	2
(Italy) F Agamenone	7^{7}	6
WC	(Brazil) E Ribeiro	7	6
Q	(Argentina) Juan Estévez	5	2
(Italy) M Cecchinato	1	0
2	(Paraguay) AD Vallejo	6	6

Second round
(Spain) N Sánchez Izquierdo	6	6
Q	(Argentina) JM La Serna	4	1
Q	(Romania) Ș Paloși	6	7^{7}
4	(Ecuador) Á Guillén Meza	2	6^{3}
5	(Brazil) T Monteiro	6	6
(Italy) F Agamenone	2	4
WC	(Brazil) E Ribeiro	3	2
2	(Paraguay) AD Vallejo	6	6

Quarterfinals
(Spain) N Sánchez Izquierdo	6	6
Q	(Romania) Ș Paloși	2	3
5	(Brazil) T Monteiro	2	6	3
2	(Paraguay) AD Vallejo	6	4	6

Semifinals
(Spain) N Sánchez Izquierdo	4	1
2	(Paraguay) AD Vallejo	6	6
