= 2026 Antofagasta Challenger – Singles =

Singles
- 2026 Antofagasta Challenger

Final
- Champion: (Brazil) João Lucas Reis da Silva
- Runner-up: (Brazil) Thiago Seyboth Wild
- Score: 7–6^{(7–2)}, 1–6, 6–2

Events
Singles	Doubles
- Antofagasta Challenger

Cristian Garín was the defending champion but chose not to defend his title.

João Lucas Reis da Silva won the title after defeating Thiago Seyboth Wild 7–6^{(7–2)}, 1–6, 6–2 in the final.

== Seeds ==
1. (Brazil) Gustavo Heide (second round)
2. (Argentina) Francisco Comesaña (first round)
3. (Chile) Tomás Barrios Vera (second round)
4. (Brazil) Thiago Seyboth Wild (final)
5. (Bolivia) Juan Carlos Prado Ángelo (semifinals)
6. (Peru) Juan Pablo Varillas (first round)
7. (Argentina) Lautaro Midón (semifinals)
8. (Argentina) Alex Barrena (first round)

== Draw ==
Key

- Q = Qualifier
- WC = Wild card
- LL = Lucky loser
- Alt = Alternate
- ITF = ITF entry
- PR = Protected ranking
- SR = Special ranking
- SE = Special exempt
- JE = Junior exempt
- JR = Junior Accelerator Programme entrant
- CO = College Accelerator Programme entrant
- NG = Next Gen Accelerator Program entrant
- w/o = Walkover
- r = Retired
- d = Defaulted

=== Finals ===
Semifinals
7	(Argentina) Lautaro Midón	4	1
4	(Brazil) Thiago Seyboth Wild	6	6
5	(Bolivia) Juan Carlos Prado Ángelo	3	4
(Brazil) João Lucas Reis da Silva	6	6

Final
4	(Brazil) Thiago Seyboth Wild	6^{2}	6	2
(Brazil) João Lucas Reis da Silva	7^{7}	1	6

=== Top half ===
First round
1	(Brazil) G Heide	6	1	6
Q	(Argentina) Máximo Zeitune	3	6	4
WC	(Colombia) Samuel Heredia	3	4
Alt	(Brazil) E Ribeiro	6	6
Q	(Uruguay) J Aguilar Cardozo	6	7
WC	(Chile) Nicolás Villalón	2	5
Q	(Brazil) J Pereira	3	6	0
7	(Argentina) L Midón	6	4	6
4	(Brazil) T Seyboth Wild	6	6
(Chile) M Soto	3	4
Alt	(Bolivia) M Dellien	6	6
(Argentina) Juan Estévez	2	0
(Argentina) G Villanueva	5	6	5
(Dominican Republic) N Hardt	7	3	7
PR	(Brazil) F Meligeni Alves	6	6
6	(Peru) JP Varillas	3	1

Second round
1	(Brazil) G Heide	6	3	4
Alt	(Brazil) E Ribeiro	3	6	6
Q	(Uruguay) J Aguilar Cardozo	6^{1}	6	6^{9}
7	(Argentina) L Midón	7^{7}	2	7^{11}
4	(Brazil) T Seyboth Wild	6	6
Alt	(Bolivia) M Dellien	1	2
(Dominican Republic) N Hardt	3	3
PR	(Brazil) F Meligeni Alves	6	6

Quarterfinals
Alt	(Brazil) E Ribeiro	2	1
7	(Argentina) L Midón	6	6
4	(Brazil) T Seyboth Wild	6	6
PR	(Brazil) F Meligeni Alves	1	4

Semifinals
7	(Argentina) L Midón	4	1
4	(Brazil) T Seyboth Wild	6	6

=== Bottom half ===
First round
5	(Bolivia) JC Prado Ángelo	6	6
Q	(Brazil) João Eduardo Schiessl	2	2
(Argentina) JB Torres	2	6^{2}
(Brazil) P Boscardin Dias	6	7^{7}
WC	(Colombia) Miguel Tobón	4	6	6
Q	(Argentina) Thiago Cigarrán	6	4	1
(Uruguay) F Roncadelli	4	2
3	(Chile) T Barrios Vera	6	6
8	(Argentina) A Barrena	5	3
(Brazil) M Pucinelli de Almeida	7	6
(Argentina) GA Olivieri	6	6
(Argentina) V Aboian	1	4
Q	(Spain) Bernardo Munk Mesa	2	2
(Brazil) JL Reis da Silva	6	6
(Argentina) GI Justo	6^{6}	7^{7}	6
2	(Argentina) F Comesaña	7^{8}	6^{4}	1

Second round
5	(Bolivia) JC Prado Ángelo	6	6
(Brazil) P Boscardin Dias	2	3
WC	(Colombia) M Tobón	3	7^{7}	7^{7}
3	(Chile) T Barrios Vera	6	6^{3}	6^{2}
(Brazil) M Pucinelli de Almeida	6	6
(Argentina) GA Olivieri	3	3
(Brazil) JL Reis da Silva	7	0
(Argentina) GI Justo	5	0^{r}

Quarterfinals
5	(Bolivia) JC Prado Ángelo	6	6
WC	(Colombia) M Tobón	2	2
(Brazil) M Pucinelli de Almeida	4	6^{1}
(Brazil) JL Reis da Silva	6	7^{7}

Semifinals
5	(Bolivia) JC Prado Ángelo	3	4
(Brazil) JL Reis da Silva	6	6
