= 2026 Open Bogotá – Singles =

Singles
- 2026 Open Bogotá

Final
- Champion: (Colombia) Nicolás Mejía
- Runner-up: (Chile) Matías Soto
- Score: 6–1, 7–5

Events
Singles	Doubles
- Open Bogotá

Patrick Kypson was the defending champion but chose not to defend his title.

Nicolás Mejía won the title after defeating Matías Soto 6–1, 7–5 in the final.

== Seeds ==
1. (Colombia) Nicolás Mejía (champion)
2. (Dominican Republic) Nick Hardt (second round)
3. (Chile) Matías Soto (final)
4. (Peru) Juan Pablo Varillas (semifinals)
5. (Argentina) Luciano Emanuel Ambrogi (second round)
6. (Mexico) Rodrigo Pacheco Méndez (first round)
7. (Argentina) Facundo Mena (quarterfinals)
8. (Brazil) Eduardo Ribeiro (second round)

== Draw ==
Key

- Q = Qualifier
- WC = Wild card
- LL = Lucky loser
- Alt = Alternate
- ITF = ITF entry
- PR = Protected ranking
- SR = Special ranking
- SE = Special exempt
- JE = Junior exempt
- JR = Junior Accelerator Programme entrant
- CO = College Accelerator Programme entrant
- NG = Next Gen Accelerator Program entrant
- w/o = Walkover
- r = Retired
- d = Defaulted

=== Finals ===
Semifinals
1	(Colombia) Nicolás Mejía	6	5	6
4	(Peru) Juan Pablo Varillas	4	7	1
3	(Chile) Matías Soto	7	7
Q	(Italy) Lorenzo Claverie	5	5

Final
1	(Colombia) Nicolás Mejía	6	7
3	(Chile) Matías Soto	1	5

=== Top half ===
First round
1	(Colombia) N Mejía	6	6
Q	(Argentina) Fermín Tenti	3	2
(Argentina) S Rodríguez Taverna	7^{7}	6
Alt	(Colombia) Samuel Alejandro Linde Palacios	6^{1}	3
(Argentina) H Casanova	7	7
Q	(Argentina) Ignacio Monzón	5	5
WC	(Colombia) Sergio Luis Hernández Ramírez	5	4
5	(Argentina) LE Ambrogi	7	6
4	(Peru) JP Varillas	2	6	6
(Brazil) Bruno Fernandez	6	3	4
(Argentina) V Aboian	5	7^{11}	5
(Mexico) LC Álvarez	7	6^{9}	7
Q	(Kazakhstan) D Popko	3	6	5
(Brazil) M Pucinelli de Almeida	6	4	7
(Colombia) JS Gómez	2	5
8	(Brazil) E Ribeiro	6	7

Second round
1	(Colombia) N Mejía	7^{7}	6^{3}	6
(Argentina) S Rodríguez Taverna	6^{2}	7^{7}	2
(Argentina) H Casanova	7^{7}	6
5	(Argentina) LE Ambrogi	6^{2}	2
4	(Peru) JP Varillas	7^{7}	6^{4}	6
(Mexico) LC Álvarez	6^{4}	7^{7}	1
(Brazil) M Pucinelli de Almeida	6	6
8	(Brazil) E Ribeiro	1	4

Quarterfinals
1	(Colombia) N Mejía	6	6
(Argentina) H Casanova	3	2
4	(Peru) JP Varillas	6	7^{7}
(Brazil) M Pucinelli de Almeida	3	6^{4}

Semifinals
1	(Colombia) N Mejía	6	5	6
4	(Peru) JP Varillas	4	7	1

=== Bottom half ===
First round
6	(Mexico) R Pacheco Méndez	4	3
Q	(Brazil) F Meligeni Alves	6	6
(Argentina) Lorenzo Joaquín Rodríguez	4	6^{1}
Q	(Brazil) Lucas Andrade da Silva	6	7^{7}
Alt	(Mexico) A Magadán	7	7
(Colombia) Johan Alexander Rodríguez	5	5
WC	(Colombia) Juan Sebastián Osorio	2	6	2
3	(Chile) M Soto	6	3	6
7	(Argentina) F Mena	3	6	7
(United States) A Ayeni	6	3	5
(United States) Tristan McCormick	7^{7}	0
(Brazil) P Sakamoto	6^{2}	0^{r}
Q	(Italy) Lorenzo Claverie	7^{7}	6^{5}	6
WC	(Colombia) Samuel Heredia	6^{3}	7^{7}	1
(Mexico) A Hernández	6^{5}	6	2
2	(Dominican Republic) N Hardt	7^{7}	4	6

Second round
Q	(Brazil) F Meligeni Alves	6	4	6^{0}
Q	(Brazil) L Andrade da Silva	4	6	7^{7}
Alt	(Mexico) A Magadán	6^{5}	3
3	(Chile) M Soto	7^{7}	6
7	(Argentina) F Mena	5	6	6
(United States) T McCormick	7	4	4
Q	(Italy) L Claverie	7^{7}	7^{7}
2	(Dominican Republic) N Hardt	6^{3}	6^{5}

Quarterfinals
Q	(Brazil) L Andrade da Silva	4	7^{7}	1
3	(Chile) M Soto	6	6^{5}	6
7	(Argentina) F Mena	6^{5}	6^{6}
Q	(Italy) L Claverie	7^{7}	7^{8}

Semifinals
3	(Chile) M Soto	7	7
Q	(Italy) L Claverie	5	5
