= 2025 Antofagasta Challenger – Singles =

Singles
- 2025 Antofagasta Challenger

Final
- Champion: (Chile) Cristian Garín
- Runner-up: (Argentina) Facundo Díaz Acosta
- Score: 2–6, 6–3, 6–3

Events
Singles	Doubles
- Antofagasta Challenger

Juan Manuel Cerúndolo was the defending champion but chose not to defend his title.

Cristian Garín won the title after defeating Facundo Díaz Acosta 2–6, 6–3, 6–3 in the final.

== Seeds ==
1. (United States) Emilio Nava (second round)
2. (Chile) Cristian Garín (champion)
3. (Bolivia) Hugo Dellien (first round)
4. (Chile) Tomás Barrios Vera (quarterfinals)
5. (Italy) Francesco Maestrelli (first round)
6. (Lebanon) Hady Habib (quarterfinals)
7. (Austria) Lukas Neumayer (second round)
8. (Argentina) Alex Barrena (withdrew)

== Draw ==
Key

- Q = Qualifier
- WC = Wild card
- LL = Lucky loser
- Alt = Alternate
- ITF = ITF entry
- PR = Protected ranking
- SR = Special ranking
- SE = Special exempt
- JE = Junior exempt
- JR = Junior Accelerator Programme entrant
- CO = College Accelerator Programme entrant
- NG = Next Gen Accelerator Program entrant
- w/o = Walkover
- r = Retired
- d = Defaulted

=== Finals ===
Semifinals
(Brazil) João Lucas Reis da Silva	6	1	4
Alt	(Argentina) Facundo Díaz Acosta	4	6	6
(Paraguay) Daniel Vallejo	6^{5}	2
2	(Chile) Cristian Garín	7^{7}	6

Final
Alt	(Argentina) Facundo Díaz Acosta	6	3	3
2	(Chile) Cristian Garín	2	6	6

=== Top half ===
First round
1	(United States) E Nava	6	6
(Brazil) M Pucinelli de Almeida	3	4
(Argentina) FA Gómez	7	6
Q	(Uruguay) J Aguilar Cardozo	5	2
(Chile) M Soto	3	3
(Brazil) JL Reis da Silva	6	6
WC	(Argentina) F Bagnis	6	3	6
5	(Italy) F Maestrelli	3	6	2
3	(Bolivia) H Dellien	6	6^{0}	4
(Ecuador) Á Guillén Meza	3	7^{7}	6
(Mexico) R Pacheco Méndez	6	6
Alt	(Brazil) P Boscardin Dias	3	1
(Argentina) N Kicker	6^{2}	4
Alt	(Argentina) F Díaz Acosta	7^{7}	6
Q	(Argentina) JB Torres	1	0
7	(Austria) L Neumayer	6	6

Second round
1	(United States) E Nava	6	4	4
(Argentina) FA Gómez	4	6	6
(Brazil) JL Reis da Silva	w/o
WC	(Argentina) F Bagnis
(Ecuador) Á Guillén Meza	6	6
(Mexico) R Pacheco Méndez	3	2
Alt	(Argentina) F Díaz Acosta	6	6
7	(Austria) L Neumayer	4	3

Quarterfinals
(Argentina) FA Gómez	2	2
(Brazil) JL Reis da Silva	6	6
(Ecuador) Á Guillén Meza	7^{7}	2	2
Alt	(Argentina) F Díaz Acosta	6^{4}	6	6

Semifinals
(Brazil) JL Reis da Silva	6	1	4
Alt	(Argentina) F Díaz Acosta	4	6	6

=== Bottom half ===
First round
LL	(Greece) A Thanos	7	6
(Bolivia) M Dellien	5	0
(Argentina) A Collarini	6	1	2
(Paraguay) AD Vallejo	1	6	6
Q	(Argentina) LE Ambrogi	4	6	4
(Argentina) L Midón	6	4	6
(Argentina) GA Olivieri	2	4
4	(Chile) T Barrios Vera	6	6
6	(Lebanon) H Habib	6	4	6
(Spain) N Sánchez Izquierdo	3	6	2
WC	(Chile) Daniel Antonio Núñez	2	5
Q	(Argentina) Carlos María Zárate	6	7
Q	(Argentina) G Villanueva	3	0
Q	(Uruguay) F Roncadelli	6	6
WC	(Chile) Benjamín Torrealba	3	2
2	(Chile) C Garín	6	6

Second round
LL	(Greece) A Thanos	3	3
(Paraguay) AD Vallejo	6	6
(Argentina) L Midón	2	2
4	(Chile) T Barrios Vera	6	6
6	(Lebanon) H Habib	3	7^{7}	6
Q	(Argentina) CM Zárate	6	6^{4}	4
Q	(Uruguay) F Roncadelli	6	1	1
2	(Chile) C Garín	2	6	6

Quarterfinals
(Paraguay) AD Vallejo	6	6
4	(Chile) T Barrios Vera	3	2
6	(Lebanon) H Habib	6^{11}	6	3
2	(Chile) C Garín	7^{13}	1	6

Semifinals
(Paraguay) AD Vallejo	6^{5}	2
2	(Chile) C Garín	7^{7}	6
