= 2026 Open Bogotá – Doubles =

Doubles
- 2026 Open Bogotá

Final
- Champions: (Chile) Matías Soto (Bolivia) Federico Zeballos
- Runners-up: (Ecuador) Gonzalo Escobar (Argentina) Facundo Mena
- Score: 6–4, 2–6, [11–9]

Events
Singles	Doubles
- Open Bogotá

Luís Britto and Zdeněk Kolář were the defending champions but only Britto chose to defend his title, partnering Juan Sebastián Gómez. They lost in the quarterfinals to Gonzalo Escobar and Facundo Mena.

Matías Soto and Federico Zeballos won the title after defeating Escobar and Mena 6–4, 2–6, [11–9] in the final.

== Seeds ==
1. (Ecuador) Gonzalo Escobar / (Argentina) Facundo Mena (final)
2. (Brazil) Eduardo Ribeiro / (Argentina) Santiago Rodríguez Taverna (quarterfinals)
3. (Chile) Matías Soto / (Bolivia) Federico Zeballos (champions)
4. (Mexico) Alex Hernández / (Mexico) Rodrigo Pacheco Méndez (semifinals)

== Draw ==
Key

- Q = Qualifier
- WC = Wild card
- LL = Lucky loser
- Alt = Alternate
- ITF = ITF entry
- PR = Protected ranking
- SR = Special ranking
- SE = Special exempt
- JE = Junior exempt
- JR = Junior Accelerator Programme entrant
- CO = College Accelerator Programme entrant
- NG = Next Gen Accelerator Program entrant
- w/o = Walkover
- r = Retired
- d = Defaulted

First round
1	(Ecuador) G Escobar (Argentina) F Mena	6	6
WC	(Colombia) Samuel Heredia (Colombia) Samuel Alejandro Linde Palacios	1	2
WC	(Colombia) Sergio Luis Hernández Ramírez (Colombia) Juan Sebastián Osorio	2	7^{8}	[8]
(Brazil) L Britto (Colombia) JS Gómez	6	6^{6}	[10]
4	(Mexico) A Hernández (Mexico) R Pacheco Méndez	6	7^{7}
(United States) A Ayeni (Venezuela) B Pérez	4	6^{4}
(Mexico) A Magadán (Colombia) Johan Alexander Rodríguez	3	6	[10]
(Brazil) JVC Loureiro (United States) C Papa	6	3	[8]
(Argentina) Lorenzo Joaquín Rodríguez (Argentina) Fermín Tenti	2	4
Alt	(Mexico) LC Álvarez (Hong Kong) Wong Tsz-fu	6	6
(Argentina) LE Ambrogi (Argentina) H Casanova	5	3
3	(Chile) M Soto (Bolivia) F Zeballos	7	6
(Brazil) Bruno Oliveira (Brazil) Natan Rodrigues	7^{7}	7
(Peru) A Huertas del Pino (Peru) C Huertas del Pino	6^{1}	5
(Colombia) C Rodríguez (Colombia) A Urrea	6	6^{1}	[8]
2	(Brazil) E Ribeiro (Argentina) S Rodríguez Taverna	2	7^{7}	[10]

Quarterfinals
1	(Ecuador) G Escobar (Argentina) F Mena	6	6
(Brazil) L Britto (Colombia) JS Gómez	1	2
4	(Mexico) A Hernández (Mexico) R Pacheco Méndez	6^{5}	6	[10]
(Mexico) A Magadán (Colombia) JA Rodríguez	7^{7}	3	[8]
Alt	(Mexico) LC Álvarez (Hong Kong) T-f Wong	2	3
3	(Chile) M Soto (Bolivia) F Zeballos	6	6
(Brazil) B Oliveira (Brazil) N Rodrigues	4	6	[10]
2	(Brazil) E Ribeiro (Argentina) S Rodríguez Taverna	6	4	[7]

Semifinals
1	(Ecuador) G Escobar (Argentina) F Mena	7^{7}	6
4	(Mexico) A Hernández (Mexico) R Pacheco Méndez	6^{5}	2
3	(Chile) M Soto (Bolivia) F Zeballos	3	6	[10]
(Brazil) B Oliveira (Brazil) N Rodrigues	6	3	[8]

Final
1	(Ecuador) G Escobar (Argentina) F Mena	4	6	[9]
3	(Chile) M Soto (Bolivia) F Zeballos	6	2	[11]
