= 2024 Antofagasta Challenger – Singles =

Singles
- 2024 Antofagasta Challenger

Final
- Champion: (Argentina) Juan Manuel Cerúndolo
- Runner-up: (Paraguay) Daniel Vallejo
- Score: 3–6, 6–2, 6–4

Events
Singles	Doubles
- Antofagasta Challenger

Camilo Ugo Carabelli was the defending champion but lost in the second round to Juan Ignacio Londero.

Juan Manuel Cerúndolo won the title after defeating Daniel Vallejo 3–6, 6–2, 6–4 in the final.

== Seeds ==
1. (Argentina) Camilo Ugo Carabelli (second round)
2. (Bolivia) Hugo Dellien (second round)
3. (Netherlands) Jesper de Jong (semifinals)
4. (Brazil) Gustavo Heide (quarterfinals)
5. (Brazil) Felipe Meligeni Alves (withdrew)
6. (Bolivia) Murkel Dellien (quarterfinals)
7. (Argentina) Facundo Mena (second round)
8. (Argentina) Juan Manuel Cerúndolo (champion)

== Draw ==
Key

- Q = Qualifier
- WC = Wild card
- LL = Lucky loser
- Alt = Alternate
- ITF = ITF entry
- PR = Protected ranking
- SR = Special ranking
- SE = Special exempt
- JE = Junior exempt
- JR = Junior Accelerator Programme entrant
- CO = College Accelerator Programme entrant
- NG = Next Gen Accelerator Program entrant
- w/o = Walkover
- r = Retired
- d = Defaulted

=== Finals ===
Semifinals
8	(Argentina) Juan Manuel Cerúndolo	6	6
(Argentina) Andrea Collarini	3	2
3	(Netherlands) Jesper de Jong	2	4
(Paraguay) Daniel Vallejo	6	6

Final
8	(Argentina) Juan Manuel Cerúndolo	3	6	6
(Paraguay) Daniel Vallejo	6	2	4

=== Top half ===
First round
1	(Argentina) C Ugo Carabelli	7^{7}	6^{5}	7^{7}
(Ecuador) Á Guillén Meza	6^{4}	7^{7}	6^{1}
Q	(Argentina) Leonardo Aboian	3	5
WC	(Argentina) JI Londero	6	7
(Argentina) JP Ficovich	0	3
(Chile) M Soto	6	6
Q	(Brazil) J Pereira	4	4
8	(Argentina) JM Cerúndolo	6	6
4	(Brazil) G Heide	6	6
Q	(Argentina) V Aboian	1	4
Q	(Argentina) A Barrena	6^{3}	7^{7}	1
Alt	(Brazil) O Luz	7^{7}	6^{5}	6
(Brazil) M Pucinelli de Almeida	6	6
WC	(Chile) Daniel Antonio Núñez	2	0
(Argentina) A Collarini	6	6
LL	(Brazil) Wilson Leite	2	3

Second round
1	(Argentina) C Ugo Carabelli	4	6	3
WC	(Argentina) JI Londero	6	2	6
(Chile) M Soto	6^{5}	4
8	(Argentina) JM Cerúndolo	7^{7}	6
4	(Brazil) G Heide	6	6
Alt	(Brazil) O Luz	2	1
(Brazil) M Pucinelli de Almeida	6	3	3
(Argentina) A Collarini	3	6	6

Quarterfinals
WC	(Argentina) JI Londero	2	4
8	(Argentina) JM Cerúndolo	6	6
4	(Brazil) G Heide	3	6	1
(Argentina) A Collarini	6	1	6

Semifinals
8	(Argentina) JM Cerúndolo	6	6
(Argentina) A Collarini	3	2

=== Bottom half ===
First round
6	(Bolivia) M Dellien	5	6	2
LL	(Italy) Edoardo Lavagno	7	3	0^{r}
(Brazil) JL Reis da Silva	5	1
(Uruguay) F Roncadelli	7	6
Q	(Argentina) Tomás Farjat	1	2
(Brazil) K Sell	6	6
(France) E Couacaud	1	5
3	(Netherlands) J de Jong	6	7
7	(Argentina) F Mena	6	6
Alt	(Brazil) D Dutra da Silva	2	1
Q	(Argentina) LE Ambrogi	6	6
WC	(Chile) Ignacio Becerra	3	1
(Paraguay) AD Vallejo	6	6
Alt	(Argentina) G Villanueva	2	4
(Brazil) M Alves	3	4
2	(Bolivia) H Dellien	6	6

Second round
6	(Bolivia) M Dellien	7	6
(Uruguay) F Roncadelli	5	2
(Brazil) K Sell	3	3
3	(Netherlands) J de Jong	6	6
7	(Argentina) F Mena	6^{5}	4
Q	(Argentina) LE Ambrogi	7^{7}	6
(Paraguay) AD Vallejo	6	6
2	(Bolivia) H Dellien	3	2

Quarterfinals
6	(Bolivia) M Dellien	4	2
3	(Netherlands) J de Jong	6	6
Q	(Argentina) LE Ambrogi	4	6	1
(Paraguay) AD Vallejo	6	2	6

Semifinals
3	(Netherlands) J de Jong	2	4
(Paraguay) AD Vallejo	6	6
