= 2026 Open Bogotá =

- Date: 6 – 12 July
- Edition: 18th
- Surface: Clay
- Location: Bogotá, Colombia

Champions

Singles
- (Colombia) Nicolás Mejía

Doubles
- (Chile) Matías Soto / (Bolivia) Federico Zeballos
- Open Bogotá

The 2026 Kia Open Bogotá was a professional tennis tournament played on clay courts. It was the 18th edition of the tournament which was part of the 2026 ATP Challenger Tour. It took place in Bogotá, Colombia between 6 and 12 July 2026.

== Singles main-draw entrants ==
=== Seeds ===
Country	Player	Rank^{1}	Seed
COL	Nicolás Mejía	165	1
DOM	Nick Hardt	267	2
CHI	Matías Soto	296	3
PER	Juan Pablo Varillas	308	4
ARG	Luciano Emanuel Ambrogi	320	5
MEX	Rodrigo Pacheco Méndez	338	6
ARG	Facundo Mena	354	7
BRA	Eduardo Ribeiro	375	8

- ^{1} Rankings are as of 29 June 2026.

=== Other entrants ===
The following players received wildcards into the singles main draw:

- (Colombia) Samuel Heredia
- (Colombia) Sergio Luis Hernández Ramírez
- (Colombia) Juan Sebastián Osorio

The following players received entry into the singles main draw as alternates:

- (Colombia) Samuel Alejandro Linde Palacios
- (Mexico) Alan Magadán

The following players received entry from the qualifying draw:

- (Brazil) Lucas Andrade da Silva
- (Italy) Lorenzo Claverie
- (Brazil) Felipe Meligeni Alves
- (Argentina) Ignacio Monzón
- (Kazakhstan) Dmitry Popko
- (Argentina) Fermín Tenti

== Champions ==
=== Singles ===
- (Colombia) Nicolás Mejía def. (Chile) Matías Soto 6–1, 7–5.

=== Doubles ===
- (Chile) Matías Soto / (Bolivia) Federico Zeballos def. (Ecuador) Gonzalo Escobar / (Argentina) Facundo Mena 6–4, 2–6, [11–9].
