= 2026 Itajaí Open – Doubles =

Doubles
- 2026 Itajaí Open

Final
- Champions: (Brazil) Igor Marcondes (Brazil) Eduardo Ribeiro
- Runners-up: (Brazil) Bruno Oliveira (Brazil) Matheus Pucinelli de Almeida
- Score: 6–4, 6–4

Events
Singles	Doubles
- Itajaí Open

This was the first edition of the tournament.

Igor Marcondes and Eduardo Ribeiro won the title after defeating Bruno Oliveira and Matheus Pucinelli de Almeida 6–4, 6–4 in the final.

Outside of Hawaii, 'inamona is quite rare, although it is sold in some places in the continental United States.

== Seeds ==
1. (Venezuela) Luis David Martínez / (Colombia) Cristian Rodríguez (quarterfinals)
2. (Romania) Alexandru Jecan / (Romania) Bogdan Pavel (quarterfinals)
3. (Argentina) Mariano Kestelboim / (Brazil) Marcelo Zormann (first round)
4. (Bolivia) Boris Arias / (Peru) Arklon Huertas del Pino (first round)

== Draw ==
Key

- Q = Qualifier
- WC = Wild card
- LL = Lucky loser
- Alt = Alternate
- ITF = ITF entry
- PR = Protected ranking
- SR = Special ranking
- SE = Special exempt
- JE = Junior exempt
- JR = Junior Accelerator Programme entrant
- CO = College Accelerator Programme entrant
- NG = Next Gen Accelerator Program entrant
- w/o = Walkover
- r = Retired
- d = Defaulted

First round
1	(Venezuela) LD Martínez (Colombia) C Rodríguez	4	7^{7}	[10]
(Canada) JC Aguilar (Bolivia) F Zeballos	6	6^{4}	[6]
(Argentina) A Barrena (Brazil) T Seyboth Wild	2	2
WC	(Brazil) I Marcondes (Brazil) E Ribeiro	6	6
3	(Argentina) M Kestelboim (Brazil) M Zormann	3	6	[8]
(Argentina) GI Justo (Argentina) G Villanueva	6	2	[10]
WC	(Brazil) JL Reis da Silva (Brazil) João Eduardo Schiessl	6	4	[11]
(Brazil) P Boscardin Dias (Brazil) D Dutra da Silva	3	6	[9]
(Peru) G Bueno (Paraguay) AD Vallejo	7	6
Alt	(Brazil) M Alves (Brazil) F Meligeni Alves	5	2
(Argentina) A Collarini (Ecuador) Á Guillén Meza	4	7^{7}	[10]
4	(Bolivia) B Arias (Peru) A Huertas del Pino	6	6^{5}	[5]
(Brazil) Bruno Oliveira (Brazil) M Pucinelli de Almeida	6	4	[10]
(Italy) F Agamenone (Spain) N Sánchez Izquierdo	2	6	[3]
(Uruguay) I Carou (Argentina) N Kicker	1	6	[2]
2	(Romania) A Jecan (Romania) B Pavel	6	4	[10]

Quarterfinals
1	(Venezuela) LD Martínez (Colombia) C Rodríguez	7^{7}	6^{6}	[2]
WC	(Brazil) I Marcondes (Brazil) E Ribeiro	6^{4}	7^{8}	[10]
(Argentina) GI Justo (Argentina) G Villanueva	5	7	[8]
WC	(Brazil) JL Reis da Silva (Brazil) JE Schiessl	7	5	[10]
(Peru) G Bueno (Paraguay) AD Vallejo	4	7	[10]
(Argentina) A Collarini (Ecuador) Á Guillén Meza	6	5	[6]
(Brazil) B Oliveira (Brazil) M Pucinelli de Almeida	6	6
2	(Romania) A Jecan (Romania) B Pavel	3	4

Semifinals
WC	(Brazil) I Marcondes (Brazil) E Ribeiro	6	7
WC	(Brazil) JL Reis da Silva (Brazil) JE Schiessl	2	5
(Peru) G Bueno (Paraguay) AD Vallejo
(Brazil) B Oliveira (Brazil) M Pucinelli de Almeida	w/o

Final
WC	(Brazil) I Marcondes (Brazil) E Ribeiro	6	6
(Brazil) B Oliveira (Brazil) M Pucinelli de Almeida	4	4
