= 2023 Antofagasta Challenger =

- Date: 18–24 September
- Edition: 1st
- Surface: Clay
- Location: Antofagasta, Chile

Champions

Singles
- (Argentina) Camilo Ugo Carabelli

Doubles
- (Bolivia) Boris Arias / (Bolivia) Federico Zeballos
Antofagasta Challenger	· 2024 →

The 2023 Antofagasta Challenger was a professional tennis tournament played on clay courts. It was the 1st edition of the tournament which was part of the 2023 ATP Challenger Tour. It took place in Antofagasta, Chile between 18 and 24 September 2023.

== Singles main-draw entrants ==
=== Seeds ===
Country	Player	Rank^{1}	Seed
ARG	Juan Manuel Cerúndolo	91	1
CHI	Tomás Barrios Vera	114	2
CHI	Alejandro Tabilo	124	3
ARG	Genaro Alberto Olivieri	138	4
BOL	Hugo Dellien	141	5
ARG	Facundo Bagnis	144	6
ARG	Francisco Comesaña	150	7
ITA	Luciano Darderi	177	8

^{1} Rankings are as of 11 September 2023.

=== Other entrants ===
The following players received wildcards into the singles main draw:

- (Chile) Gonzalo Lama
- (Bolivia) Juan Carlos Prado Ángelo
- (Chile) Matías Soto

The following players received entry into the singles main draw as alternates:

- (United States) Tristan Boyer
- (Norway) Viktor Durasovic
- (Brazil) Eduardo Ribeiro

The following players received entry from the qualifying draw:

- (Brazil) Pedro Boscardin Dias
- (Argentina) Tomás Farjat
- (Brazil) Gilbert Klier Júnior
- (Argentina) Facundo Mena
- (Argentina) Ignacio Monzón
- (Brazil) Pedro Sakamoto

== Champions ==
=== Singles ===
- (Argentina) Camilo Ugo Carabelli def. (United States) Tristan Boyer 3–6, 6–1, 7–5.

=== Doubles ===
- (Bolivia) Boris Arias / (Bolivia) Federico Zeballos def. (Italy) Luciano Darderi / (Bolivia) Murkel Dellien 5–7, 6–4, [10–8].
