= 2025 Antofagasta Challenger – Doubles =

Doubles
- 2025 Antofagasta Challenger

Final
- Champions: (Ecuador) Gonzalo Escobar (Mexico) Miguel Ángel Reyes-Varela
- Runners-up: (Brazil) Luís Britto (Brazil) Matheus Pucinelli de Almeida
- Score: 6–3, 4–6, [10–6]

Events
Singles	Doubles
- Antofagasta Challenger

Mateus Alves and Matías Soto were the defending champions but only Soto chose to defend his title, partnering Gonzalo Villanueva. They lost in the first round to Hady Habib and Mariano Kestelboim.

Gonzalo Escobar and Miguel Ángel Reyes-Varela won the title after deafeting Luís Britto and Matheus Pucinelli de Almeida 6–3, 4–6, [10–6] in the final.

== Seeds ==
1. (Ecuador) Gonzalo Escobar / (Mexico) Miguel Ángel Reyes-Varela (champions)
2. (Chile) Matías Soto / (Argentina) Gonzalo Villanueva (first round)
3. (Colombia) Cristian Rodríguez / (Bolivia) Federico Zeballos (quarterfinals)
4. (Bolivia) Boris Arias / (Bolivia) Murkel Dellien (first round)

== Draw ==
Key

- Q = Qualifier
- WC = Wild card
- LL = Lucky loser
- Alt = Alternate
- ITF = ITF entry
- PR = Protected ranking
- SR = Special ranking
- SE = Special exempt
- JE = Junior exempt
- JR = Junior Accelerator Programme entrant
- CO = College Accelerator Programme entrant
- NG = Next Gen Accelerator Program entrant
- w/o = Walkover
- r = Retired
- d = Defaulted

=== Draw ===
First round
1	(Ecuador) G Escobar (Mexico) M Reyes-Varela	6	6
WC	(United States) Milledge Cossu (Chile) Bastián Malla	4	0
(Argentina) L Midón (Spain) N Sánchez Izquierdo	7	6
WC	(Argentina) F Bagnis (Chile) Bautista de la Peña	5	3
4	(Bolivia) B Arias (Bolivia) M Dellien	6^{3}	4
(Argentina) FA Gómez (Argentina) N Kicker	7^{7}	6
(Ecuador) Á Guillén Meza (Paraguay) AD Vallejo	6	6
Alt	(Uruguay) J Aguilar Cardozo (Argentina) LE Ambrogi	4	1
(Brazil) Bruno Oliveira (Argentina) JB Torres	0	2
(Brazil) L Britto (Brazil) M Pucinelli de Almeida	6	6
(Uruguay) I Carou (Uruguay) F Roncadelli	5	6^{5}
3	(Colombia) C Rodríguez (Bolivia) F Zeballos	7	7^{7}
(Argentina) Valentín Basel (Argentina) F Ribero	1	6	[10]
(Argentina) S de la Fuente (Argentina) GA Olivieri	6	2	[7]
(Lebanon) H Habib (Argentina) M Kestelboim	6	2	[10]
2	(Chile) M Soto (Argentina) G Villanueva	3	6	[8]

Quarterfinals
1	(Ecuador) G Escobar (Mexico) M Reyes-Varela	7	6
(Argentina) L Midón (Spain) N Sánchez Izquierdo	5	2
(Argentina) FA Gómez (Argentina) N Kicker	6	6
(Ecuador) Á Guillén Meza (Paraguay) AD Vallejo	2	4
(Brazil) L Britto (Brazil) M Pucinelli de Almeida	6^{3}	6	[10]
3	(Colombia) C Rodríguez (Bolivia) F Zeballos	7^{7}	3	[7]
(Argentina) V Basel (Argentina) F Ribero	4	6^{6}
(Lebanon) H Habib (Argentina) M Kestelboim	6	7^{8}

Semifinals
1	(Ecuador) G Escobar (Mexico) M Reyes-Varela	4	6	[10]
(Argentina) FA Gómez (Argentina) N Kicker	6	4	[5]
(Brazil) L Britto (Brazil) M Pucinelli de Almeida	5	6	[10]
(Lebanon) H Habib (Argentina) M Kestelboim	7	0	[4]

Final
1	(Ecuador) G Escobar (Mexico) M Reyes-Varela	6	4	[10]
(Brazil) L Britto (Brazil) M Pucinelli de Almeida	3	6	[6]
