= 2026 Antofagasta Challenger =

- Date: 5 – 11 October
- Edition: 4th
- Surface: Clay
- Location: Antofagasta, Chile

Champions

Singles
- (Brazil) João Lucas Reis da Silva

Doubles
- (Brazil) Eduardo Ribeiro / (Brazil) Marcelo Zormann
- Antofagasta Challenger

The 2026 Antofagasta Challenger was a professional tennis tournament played on clay courts. It was the fourth edition of the tournament which was part of the 2026 ATP Challenger Tour. It took place in Antofagasta, Chile between 5 and 11 October 2026.

== Singles main-draw entrants ==
=== Seeds ===
Country	Player	Rank^{1}	Seed
BRA	Gustavo Heide	122	1
ARG	Francisco Comesaña	123	2
CHI	Tomás Barrios Vera	135	3
BRA	Thiago Seyboth Wild	136	4
BOL	Juan Carlos Prado Ángelo	159	5
PER	Juan Pablo Varillas	193	6
ARG	Lautaro Midón	200	7
ARG	Alex Barrena	220	8

^{1} Rankings are as of 28 September 2026.

=== Other entrants ===
The following players received wildcards into the singles main draw:

- (Colombia) Samuel Heredia
- (Colombia) Miguel Tobón
- (Chile) Nicolás Villalón

The following player received entry into the singles main draw using a protected ranking:

- (Brazil) Felipe Meligeni Alves

The following players received entry into the singles main draw as alternates:

- (Bolivia) Murkel Dellien
- (Brazil) Eduardo Ribeiro

The following players received entry from the qualifying draw:

- (Uruguay) Joaquín Aguilar Cardozo
- (Argentina) Thiago Cigarrán
- (Spain) Bernardo Munk Mesa
- (Brazil) José Pereira
- (Brazil) João Eduardo Schiessl
- (Argentina) Máximo Zeitune

== Champions ==
=== Singles ===
- (Brazil) João Lucas Reis da Silva def. (Brazil) Thiago Seyboth Wild 7–6^{(7–2)}, 1–6, 6–2.

=== Doubles ===
- (Brazil) Eduardo Ribeiro / (Brazil) Marcelo Zormann def. (Mexico) Alan Magadán / (Peru) Alexander Merino 6–1, 6–3.
