= 2026 Itajaí Open =

- Date: 19–25 January
- Edition: 1st
- Surface: Clay
- Location: Itajaí, Brazil

Champions

Singles
- (Paraguay) Daniel Vallejo

Doubles
- (Brazil) Igor Marcondes / (Brazil) Eduardo Ribeiro
- Itajaí Open

The 2026 Itajaí Open was a professional tennis tournament played on clay courts. It was the first edition of the tournament which was part of the 2026 ATP Challenger Tour. It took place in Itajaí, Brazil between 19 and 25 January 2026.

== Singles main draw entrants ==
=== Seeds ===
Country	Player	Rank^{1}	Seed
BOL	Hugo Dellien	137	1
PAR	Daniel Vallejo	146	2
ARG	Alex Barrena	188	3
ECU	Álvaro Guillén Meza	193	4
BRA	Thiago Monteiro	194	5
BRA	João Lucas Reis da Silva	206	6
PER	Gonzalo Bueno	214	7
BRA	Thiago Seyboth Wild	216	8

- ^{1} Rankings as of 12 January 2026.

=== Other entrants ===
The following players received wildcards into the singles main draw:

- (Brazil) Igor Marcondes
- (Brazil) Eduardo Ribeiro
- (Brazil) João Eduardo Schiessl

The following players received entry from the qualifying draw:

- (Brazil) Mateus Alves
- (Argentina) Juan Estévez
- (Argentina) Guido Iván Justo
- (Argentina) Juan Manuel La Serna
- (Romania) Ștefan Paloși
- (Argentina) Juan Bautista Torres

== Champions ==
=== Singles ===
- (Paraguay) Daniel Vallejo def. (Brazil) Thiago Seyboth Wild 7–5, 4–6, 6–2.

=== Doubles ===
- (Brazil) Igor Marcondes / (Brazil) Eduardo Ribeiro def. (Brazil) Bruno Oliveira / (Brazil) Matheus Pucinelli de Almeida 6–4, 6–4.
