= 2024 Antofagasta Challenger =

- Date: 23–29 September
- Edition: 2nd
- Surface: Clay
- Location: Antofagasta, Chile

Champions

Singles
- (Argentina) Juan Manuel Cerúndolo

Doubles
- (Brazil) Mateus Alves / (Chile) Matías Soto
← 2023 ·	Antofagasta Challenger	· 2025 →

The 2024 Antofagasta Challenger was a professional tennis tournament played on clay courts. It was the second edition of the tournament which was part of the 2024 ATP Challenger Tour. It took place in Antofagasta, Chile between 23 and 29 September 2024.

== Singles main-draw entrants ==
=== Seeds ===
Country	Player	Rank^{1}	Seed
ARG	Camilo Ugo Carabelli	91	1
BOL	Hugo Dellien	109	2
NED	Jesper de Jong	131	3
BRA	Gustavo Heide	150	4
~~BRA~~	~~Felipe Meligeni Alves~~	~~166~~	~~5~~
BOL	Murkel Dellien	184	6
ARG	Facundo Mena	199	7
ARG	Juan Manuel Cerúndolo	203	8

^{1} Rankings are as of 16 September 2024.

=== Other entrants ===
The following players received wildcards into the singles main draw:

- (Chile) Ignacio Becerra
- (Argentina) Juan Ignacio Londero
- (Chile) Daniel Antonio Núñez

The following players received entry into the singles main draw as alternates:

- (Brazil) Daniel Dutra da Silva
- (Brazil) Orlando Luz
- (Argentina) Gonzalo Villanueva

The following players received entry from the qualifying draw:

- (Argentina) Leonardo Aboian
- (Argentina) Valerio Aboian
- (Argentina) Lucian Emanuel Ambrogi
- (Argentina) Alex Barrena
- (Argentina) Tomás Farjat
- (Brazil) José Pereira

The following players received entry as lucky losers:

- (Italy) Edoardo Lavagno
- (Brazil) Wilson Leite

== Champions ==
=== Singles ===
- (Argentina) Juan Manuel Cerúndolo def. (Paraguay) Daniel Vallejo 3–6, 6–2, 6–4.

=== Doubles ===
- (Brazil) Mateus Alves / (Chile) Matías Soto def. (Argentina) Leonardo Aboian / (Argentina) Valerio Aboian 6–1, 6–4.
