= 2024 Antofagasta Challenger – Doubles =

Doubles
- 2024 Antofagasta Challenger

Final
- Champions: (Brazil) Mateus Alves (Chile) Matías Soto
- Runners-up: (Argentina) Leonardo Aboian (Argentina) Valerio Aboian
- Score: 6–1, 6–4

Events
Singles	Doubles
- Antofagasta Challenger

Boris Arias and Federico Zeballos were the defending champions but lost in the first round to Enzo Couacaud and Jesper de Jong.

Mateus Alves and Matías Soto won the title after defeating Leonardo and Valerio Aboian 6–1, 6–4 in the final.

== Seeds ==
1. (Brazil) Orlando Luz / (Brazil) Marcelo Zormann (semifinals)
2. (Bolivia) Boris Arias / (Bolivia) Federico Zeballos (first round)
3. (Argentina) Guillermo Durán / (Argentina) Mariano Kestelboim (withdrew)
4. (United Kingdom) Scott Duncan / (United States) Hunter Reese (first round)
5. (Brazil) Mateus Alves / (Chile) Matías Soto (champions)

== Draw ==
Key

- Q = Qualifier
- WC = Wild card
- LL = Lucky loser
- Alt = Alternate
- ITF = ITF entry
- PR = Protected ranking
- SR = Special ranking
- SE = Special exempt
- JE = Junior exempt
- JR = Junior Accelerator Programme entrant
- CO = College Accelerator Programme entrant
- NG = Next Gen Accelerator Program entrant
- w/o = Walkover
- r = Retired
- d = Defaulted

=== Draw ===
First round
1	(Brazil) O Luz (Brazil) M Zormann	6	6
WC	(Chile) Ignacio Becerra (Chile) Daniel Antonio Núñez	2	3
(Brazil) G Heide (Brazil) JL Reis da Silva	7	6
(Brazil) L Britto (Brazil) PA Saraiva dos Santos	5	2
4	(United Kingdom) S Duncan (United States) H Reese	3	6	[8]
(Ecuador) Á Guillén Meza (Paraguay) AD Vallejo	6	4	[10]
Alt	(Argentina) Leonardo Aboian (Argentina) V Aboian	6	6
(Argentina) A Collarini (Argentina) JP Ficovich	1	4
WC	(United States) Anders Matta (Brazil) F Meligeni Alves
Alt	(Argentina) LE Ambrogi (Chile) Benjamín Zuñiga García	w/o
(Argentina) F Mena (Uruguay) F Roncadelli	6^{5}	6	[5]
5	(Brazil) M Alves (Chile) M Soto	7^{7}	4	[10]
Alt	(Brazil) Breno Braga (Brazil) Victor Braga	w/o
(Bolivia) H Dellien (Bolivia) M Dellien
(France) E Couacaud (Netherlands) J de Jong	6	6
2	(Bolivia) B Arias (Bolivia) F Zeballos	3	4

Quarterfinals
1	(Brazil) O Luz (Brazil) M Zormann	6	2	[10]
(Brazil) G Heide (Brazil) JL Reis da Silva	3	6	[4]
(Ecuador) Á Guillén Meza (Paraguay) AD Vallejo
Alt	(Argentina) L Aboian (Argentina) V Aboian	w/o
Alt	(Argentina) LE Ambrogi (Chile) B Zuñiga García	1	2
5	(Brazil) M Alves (Chile) M Soto	6	6
Alt	(Brazil) B Braga (Brazil) V Braga	3	2
(France) E Couacaud (Netherlands) J de Jong	6	6

Semifinals
1	(Brazil) O Luz (Brazil) M Zormann	6	5	[7]
Alt	(Argentina) L Aboian (Argentina) V Aboian	3	7	[10]
5	(Brazil) M Alves (Chile) M Soto	4	6	[10]
(France) E Couacaud (Netherlands) J de Jong	6	4	[6]

Final
Alt	(Argentina) L Aboian (Argentina) V Aboian	1	4
5	(Brazil) M Alves (Chile) M Soto	6	6
