= Itajaí Open =

- 2026 Itajaí Open

ATP Challenger Tour
- Location: Itajaí, Brazil
- Category: ATP Challenger Tour
- Surface: Clay

The Itajaí Open is a professional tennis tournament played on clay courts. It is currently part of the ATP Challenger Tour. It was first held in Itajaí, Brazil in 2026.

== Past finals ==
=== Singles ===
Year	Champion	Runner-up	Score
2026	(Paraguay) Daniel Vallejo	(Brazil) Thiago Seyboth Wild	7–5, 4–6, 6–2

=== Doubles ===
Year	Champions	Runners-up	Score
2026	(Brazil) Igor Marcondes (Brazil) Eduardo Ribeiro	(Brazil) Bruno Oliveira (Brazil) Matheus Pucinelli de Almeida	6–4, 6–4
