= 2026 Lexington Open =

- Date: 27 July–9 August
- Edition: 31st (men); 29th (women)
- Category: ATP Challenger Tour; ITF Women's World Tennis Tour
- Surface: Hard / Outdoor
- Location: Lexington, United States

Champions

Men's singles
- (Lithuania) Edas Butvilas

Women's singles
- (Finland) Anastasia Kulikova

Men's doubles
- (Ecuador) Gonzalo Escobar / (India) Niki Kaliyanda Poonacha

Women's doubles
- (United States) Ayana Akli / (United States) Fiona Crawley
- Lexington Open

The 2026 Lexington Open was a professional tennis tournament played on outdoor hard courts. It was the 31st edition of the tournament for men, which was part of the 2026 ATP Challenger Tour, and the 29th edition for women, which was part of the 2026 ITF Women's World Tennis Tour. It took place in Lexington, Kentucky, United States, between 27 July and 9 August 2026.

== Champions ==
=== Men's singles ===
- (Lithuania) Edas Butvilas def. (United States) Andre Ilagan 6–2, 1–6, 7–6^{(8–6)}.

=== Women's singles ===
- (Finland) Anastasia Kulikova def. (United States) Ayana Akli 7–5, 6–4

=== Men's doubles ===
- (Ecuador) Gonzalo Escobar / (India) Niki Kaliyanda Poonacha def. (United States) Andre Ilagan / (United States) Karl Poling 6–7^{(1–7)}, 6–3, [11–9].

=== Women's doubles ===
- (United States) Ayana Akli / (United States) Fiona Crawley def. (United States) Savannah Broadus / (United States) Kylie Collins 2–6, 7–6^{(7–3)}, [12–10]

== Men's singles main draw entrants ==
=== Seeds ===
Country	Player	Rank^{1}	Seed
TUN	Moez Echargui	151	1
SRB	Dušan Lajović	152	2
AUS	Tristan Schoolkate	161	3
USA	Tristan Boyer	162	4
CRO	Borna Gojo	164	5
JPN	Rei Sakamoto	166	6
AUS	Alex Bolt	168	7
GBR	Jack Pinnington Jones	172	8

- ^{1} Rankings as of 27 July 2026.

=== Other entrants ===
The following players received a wildcard into the singles main draw:

- (Canada) Nicolas Arseneault
- (United States) Ozan Baris
- (United States) Tristan Boyer

The following players received entry into the singles main draw through the College Accelerator programme:

- (Japan) Jay Friend
- (United States) Sebastian Gorzny

The following players received entry into the singles main draw as alternates:

- (Ecuador) Andy Andrade
- (United States) Andre Ilagan
- (Australia) James McCabe

The following players received entry from the qualifying draw:

- (United Kingdom) Millen Hurrion
- (United States) Spencer Johnson
- (South Korea) Kwon Soon-woo
- (United States) Andres Martin
- (United States) Aidan Mayo
- (Jordan) Abdullah Shelbayh
