= 2026 Lexington Open – Men's singles =

Men's singles
- 2026 Lexington Open

Final
- Champion: (Lithuania) Edas Butvilas
- Runner-up: (United States) Andre Ilagan
- Score: 6–2, 1–6, 7–6^{(8–6)}

Events
Singles	men	women
Doubles	men	women
- Lexington Open

Zachary Svajda was the defending champion but chose not to defend his title.

Edas Butvilas won the title after defeating Andre Ilagan 6–2, 1–6, 7–6^{(8–6)} in the final.

== Seeds ==
1. (Tunisia) Moez Echargui (first round)
2. (Serbia) Dušan Lajović (semifinals)
3. (Australia) Tristan Schoolkate (first round, retired)
4. (United States) Tristan Boyer (first round)
5. (Croatia) Borna Gojo (second round)
6. (Japan) Rei Sakamoto (quarterfinals)
7. (Australia) Alex Bolt (first round)
8. (United Kingdom) Jack Pinnington Jones (first round)

== Draw ==
Key

- Q = Qualifier
- WC = Wild card
- LL = Lucky loser
- Alt = Alternate
- ITF = ITF entry
- PR = Protected ranking
- SR = Special ranking
- SE = Special exempt
- JE = Junior exempt
- JR = Junior Accelerator Programme entrant
- CO = College Accelerator Programme entrant
- NG = Next Gen Accelerator Program entrant
- w/o = Walkover
- r = Retired
- d = Defaulted

=== Finals ===
Semifinals
Q	(United States) Spencer Johnson	4	4
Alt	(United States) Andre Ilagan	6	6
(Lithuania) Edas Butvilas	6	6^{5}	6
2	(Serbia) Dušan Lajović	2	7^{7}	2

Final
Alt	(United States) Andre Ilagan	2	6	6^{6}
(Lithuania) Edas Butvilas	6	1	7^{8}

=== Top half ===
First round
1	(Tunisia) M Echargui	4	3
Q	(United States) Spencer Johnson	6	6
CO	(Japan) J Friend	5	7^{7}	6
(United States) C Smith	7	6^{4}	3
WC	(Canada) N Arseneault	2	2
Q	(United States) A Martin	6	6
Q	(United Kingdom) Millen Hurrion	7^{7}	6
8	(United Kingdom) J Pinnington Jones	6^{5}	4
3	(Australia) T Schoolkate	6	1^{r}
Q	(South Korea) S-w Kwon	3	5
Alt	(Ecuador) A Andrade	3	4
Alt	(United States) Andre Ilagan	6	6
(Chinese Taipei) Y-h Hsu	6	1	2
CO	(United States) S Gorzny	3	6	6
(United Kingdom) F Gill	4	6	4
5	(Croatia) B Gojo	6	4	6

Second round
Q	(United States) S Johnson	6	6
CO	(Japan) J Friend	3	0
Q	(United States) A Martin	6	4	6
Q	(United Kingdom) M Hurrion	3	6	2
Q	(South Korea) S-w Kwon	6	6^{4}	4
Alt	(United States) A Ilagan	3	7^{7}	6
CO	(United States) S Gorzny	6	2	7^{7}
5	(Croatia) B Gojo	4	6	6^{3}

Quarterfinals
Q	(United States) S Johnson	4	7^{7}	6
Q	(United States) A Martin	6	6^{3}	3
Alt	(United States) A Ilagan	7^{7}	6
CO	(United States) S Gorzny	6^{5}	4

Semifinals
Q	(United States) S Johnson	4	4
Alt	(United States) A Ilagan	6	6

=== Bottom half ===
First round
6	(Japan) R Sakamoto	7^{7}	7
Q	(United States) A Mayo	6^{3}	5
(United Kingdom) H Wendelken	4	2
(United States) M Mmoh	6	6
WC	(United States) O Baris	6	7
(United Kingdom) L Broady	4	5
(Lithuania) E Butvilas	6	3	6
4/WC	(United States) T Boyer	3	6	3
7	(Australia) A Bolt	2	3
Q	(Jordan) A Shelbayh	6	6
(Italy) F Cinà	6	7
(Sweden) E Ymer	3	5
(United Kingdom) H Searle	5	6	3
(South Africa) L Harris	7	2	6
Alt	(Australia) J McCabe	3	7^{7}	3
2	(Serbia) D Lajović	6	6^{5}	6

Second round
6	(Japan) R Sakamoto	6	6
(United States) M Mmoh	4	4
WC	(United States) O Baris	0	2
(Lithuania) E Butvilas	6	6
Q	(Jordan) A Shelbayh	7^{7}	6
(Italy) F Cinà	6^{3}	2
(South Africa) L Harris	6	3	4
2	(Serbia) D Lajović	0	6	6

Quarterfinals
6	(Japan) R Sakamoto	6^{5}	6	5
(Lithuania) E Butvilas	7^{7}	3	7
Q	(Jordan) A Shelbayh	6^{4}	6	4
2	(Serbia) D Lajović	7^{7}	2	6

Semifinals
(Lithuania) E Butvilas	6	6^{5}	6
2	(Serbia) D Lajović	2	7^{7}	2
