= 2026 Lexington Open – Men's doubles =

Men's doubles
- 2026 Lexington Open

Final
- Champions: (Ecuador) Gonzalo Escobar (India) Niki Kaliyanda Poonacha
- Runners-up: (United States) Andre Ilagan (United States) Karl Poling
- Score: 6–7^{(1–7)}, 6–3, [11–9]

Events
Singles	men	women
Doubles	men	women
- Lexington Open

Anirudh Chandrasekar and Ramkumar Ramanathan were the defending champions but only Chandrasekar chose to defend his title, partnering Takeru Yuzuki. They lost in the first round to Calum Puttergill and Joshua Sheehy.

Gonzalo Escobar and Niki Kaliyanda Poonacha won the title after defeating Andre Ilagan and Karl Poling 6–7^{(1–7)}, 6–3, [11–9] in the final.

== Seeds ==
1. (Chinese Taipei) Ray Ho / Ivan Liutarevich (semifinals)
2. (United States) Benjamin Kittay / (Brazil) Fernando Romboli (first round)
3. (Ecuador) Gonzalo Esocbar / (India) Niki Kaliyanda Poonacha (champions)
4. (United States) George Goldhoff / (United States) Trey Hilderbrand (first round)

== Draw ==
Key

- Q = Qualifier
- WC = Wild card
- LL = Lucky loser
- Alt = Alternate
- ITF = ITF entry
- PR = Protected ranking
- SR = Special ranking
- SE = Special exempt
- JE = Junior exempt
- JR = Junior Accelerator Programme entrant
- CO = College Accelerator Programme entrant
- NG = Next Gen Accelerator Program entrant
- w/o = Walkover
- r = Retired
- d = Defaulted

First round
1	(Chinese Taipei) R Ho; I Liutarevich	6	6
(Chinese Taipei) Y-h Hsu (Japan) S Watanabe	3	3
(Thailand) P Isaro (India) S Myneni	4	6	[8]
(New Zealand) A Rai (New Zealand) F Reynolds	6	3	[10]
3	(Ecuador) G Escobar (India) N Kaliyanda Poonacha	7^{7}	7^{8}
(Uruguay) A Behar (United Kingdom) J Paris	6^{2}	6^{6}
(Australia) C Puttergill (United States) J Sheehy	7^{7}	6^{4}	[10]
(India) A Chandrasekar (Japan) T Yuzuki	6^{1}	7^{7}	[8]
(Ecuador) A Andrade (Antigua and Barbuda) J Maginley	3	4
WC	(Canada) Mikael Arseneault (Canada) N Arseneault	6	6
Alt	(United States) Andre Ilagan (United States) K Poling	7^{7}	7^{8}
4	(United States) G Goldhoff (United States) T Hilderbrand	6^{5}	6^{6}
(South Korea) J-s Nam (United States) R Stalder	6	6
WC	(New Zealand) Jack Loutit (United States) Eli Stephenson	2	2
(Australia) B Bayldon (Australia) P Harper	7^{7}	6
2	(United States) B Kittay (Brazil) F Romboli	6^{3}	4

Quarterfinals
1	(Chinese Taipei) R Ho; I Liutarevich	7^{7}	4	[10]
(New Zealand) A Rai (New Zealand) F Reynolds	6^{5}	6	[6]
3	(Ecuador) G Escobar (India) N Kaliyanda Poonacha	6	6
(Australia) C Puttergill (United States) J Sheehy	1	2
WC	(Canada) M Arseneault (Canada) N Arseneault	4	2
Alt	(United States) A Ilagan (United States) K Poling	6	6
(South Korea) J-s Nam (United States) R Stalder	6	6
(Australia) B Bayldon (Australia) P Harper	4	2

Semifinals
1	(Chinese Taipei) R Ho; I Liutarevich	6	5	[6]
3	(Ecuador) G Escobar (India) N Kaliyanda Poonacha	4	7	[10]
Alt	(United States) A Ilagan (United States) K Poling	6	3	[10]
(South Korea) J-s Nam (United States) R Stalder	3	6	[7]

Final
3	(Ecuador) G Escobar (India) N Kaliyanda Poonacha	6^{1}	6	[11]
Alt	(United States) A Ilagan (United States) K Poling	7^{7}	3	[9]
