= 2025 Antofagasta Challenger =

- Date: 29 September – 5 October
- Edition: 3rd
- Surface: Clay
- Location: Antofagasta, Chile

Champions

Singles
- (Chile) Cristian Garín

Doubles
- (Ecuador) Gonzalo Escobar / (Mexico) Miguel Ángel Reyes-Varela
- Antofagasta Challenger

The 2025 Antofagasta Challenger was a professional tennis tournament played on clay courts. It was the third edition of the tournament which was part of the 2025 ATP Challenger Tour. It took place in Antofagasta, Chile between 29 September and 5 October 2025.

== Singles main-draw entrants ==
=== Seeds ===
| Country | Player | Rank^{1} | Seed |
|---|---|---|---|
| USA | Emilio Nava | 90 | 1 |
| CHI | Cristian Garín | 124 | 2 |
| BOL | Hugo Dellien | 126 | 3 |
| CHI | Tomás Barrios Vera | 133 | 4 |
| ITA | Francesco Maestrelli | 154 | 5 |
| LBN | Hady Habib | 172 | 6 |
| AUT | Lukas Neumayer | 175 | 7 |
| ~~ARG~~ | ~~Alex Barrena~~ | ~~188~~ | ~~8~~ |

^{1} Rankings are as of 22 September 2025.

=== Other entrants ===
The following players received wildcards into the singles main draw:

- (Argentina) Facundo Bagnis
- (Chile) Daniel Antonio Núñez
- (Chile) Benjamín Torrealba

The following players received entry into the singles main draw as alternates:

- (Brazil) Pedro Boscardin Dias
- (Argentina) Facundo Díaz Acosta

The following players received entry from the qualifying draw:

- (Uruguay) Joaquín Aguilar Cardozo
- (Argentina) Luciano Emanuel Ambrogi
- (Uruguay) Franco Roncadelli
- (Argentina) Juan Bautista Torres
- (Argentina) Gonzalo Villanueva
- (Argentina) Carlos María Zárate

The following player received entry as a lucky loser:

- (Greece) Aristotelis Thanos

== Champions ==
=== Singles ===
- (Chile) Cristian Garín def. (Argentina) Facundo Díaz Acosta 2–6, 6–3, 6–3.

=== Doubles ===
- (Ecuador) Gonzalo Escobar / (Mexico) Miguel Ángel Reyes-Varela def. (Brazil) Luís Britto / (Brazil) Matheus Pucinelli de Almeida 6–3, 4–6, [10–6].
