= Gonzalo Escobar (tennis) =

Ecuadorian tennis player (born 1989)

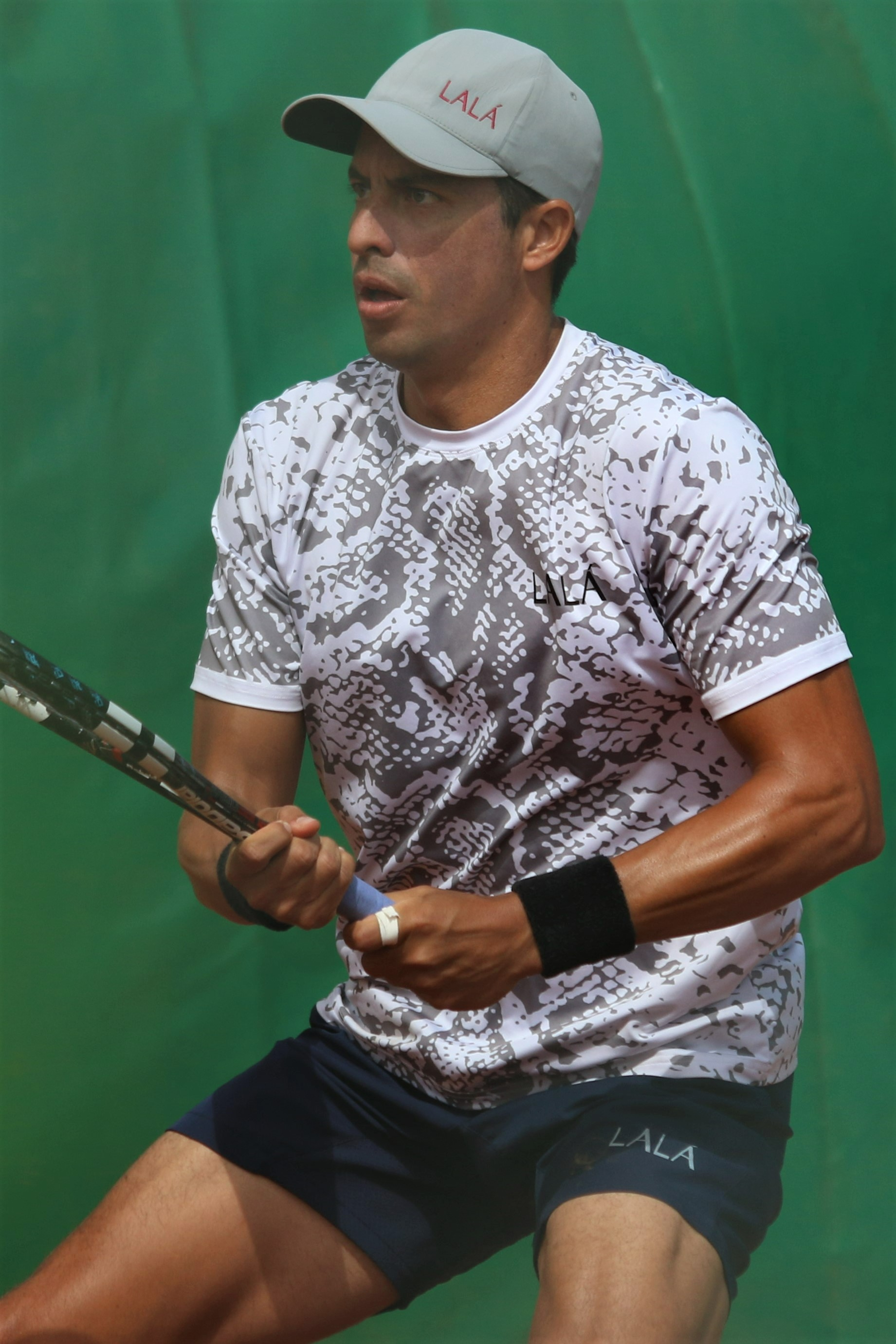
- Escobar at the 2022 Monte-Carlo Masters
- Full name: Gonzalo Escobar
- Country (sports): Ecuador
- Residence: Manta, Ecuador
- Born: 20 January 1989 (age 37) Manta, Ecuador
- Height: 1.78 m (5 ft 10 in)
- Plays: Left-handed (two–handed backhand)
- College: Texas Tech University
- Prize money: $ 1,071,488

Singles
- Career record: 5 - 5 (at ATP Tour level, Grand Slam level, and in Davis Cup)
- Career titles: 0
- Highest ranking: No. 281 (15 June 2015)

Doubles
- Career record: 127–114
- Career titles: 6
- Highest ranking: No. 38 (15 November 2021)
- Current ranking: No. 84 (10 November 2025)

Grand Slam doubles results
- Australian Open: 3R (2022, 2023)
- French Open: 2R (2022, 2024)
- Wimbledon: 3R (2021)
- US Open: 3R (2022)

Grand Slam mixed doubles results
- Australian Open: SF (2022)
- French Open: QF (2022)
- Wimbledon: 2R (2021)
Medal record
Representing Ecuador
Men's tennis
Pan American Games
Gold medal – first place	2019 Lima	Men's doubles
Bronze medal – third place	2015 Toronto	Men's doubles
- Last updated on: 16 June 2025.

Gonzalo Escobar (Latin American Spanish: [ɡonˈsalo eskoˈβaɾ]; born 20 January 1989, in Manta) is an Ecuadorian tennis player. His career-high doubles ranking is World No. 38, achieved on 15 November 2021. He has won three ATP doubles titles with Uruguayan Ariel Behar and three with Kazakhstani Aleksandr Nedovyesov. Escobar also has a career high ATP singles ranking of No. 281 achieved on 15 June 2015.

Playing for Ecuador in Davis Cup, Escobar has a W/L record of 8–9.

== Career ==
=== 2021–2022: Three ATP doubles titles and top 50 ===
Partnering with Uruguayan Ariel Behar, Escobar won two ATP titles at the 2021 Delray Beach Open and the 2021 Andalucía Open and reached three other finals on the ATP tour in 2021 after winning two ATP Challenger Tour titles together in 2020. He entered the top 50 following the final at the 2021 Serbia Open on 26 April 2021. He reached the third round of a Major for the first time at the 2021 Wimbledon Championships. Escobar finished the year 2021 ranked No. 38, a career-high doubles ranking.

In 2022, he reached a fourth final and won his third ATP 250 title with Behar at the 2022 Serbia Open defeating top seeds Mate Pavić and Nikola Mektić. The pair reached two Major third rounds at the 2022 Australian Open and the 2022 US Open (tennis). Escobar finished the year 2022 ranked No. 40, a second best career-high doubles ranking.

=== 2023: Fourth and fifth ATP titles ===
He reached the third round at the 2023 Australian Open with Tomislav Brkić.

He reached his ninth ATP final at the 2023 Libéma Open with Kazakhstani Aleksandr Nedovyesov, losing to Wesley Koolhof and Neal Skupski.

He won his fourth title at the 2023 Swedish Open with Nedovyesov. He won his fifth title at the 2023 Sofia Open with Nedovyesov.

== ATP career finals ==
=== Doubles: 14 (6 titles, 8 runner-ups) ===
Legend Grand Slam tournaments (0–0) ATP World Tour Finals (0–0) ATP World Tour Masters 1000 (0–0) ATP World Tour 500 Series (0–0) ATP World Tour 250 Series (6–8)	Titles by surface Hard (2–2) Clay (4–3) Grass (0–3)	Titles by setting Outdoor (5–8) Indoor (1–0)

Result	W–L	Date	Tournament	Tier	Surface	Partner	Opponents	Score
Win	1–0	Jan 2021	Delray Beach Open, United States	250 Series	Hard	(Uruguay) Ariel Behar	(United States) Christian Harrison (United States) Ryan Harrison	6–7^{(5–7)}, 7–6^{(7–4)}, [10–4]
Loss	1–1	Mar 2021	Argentina Open, Argentina	250 Series	Clay	(Uruguay) Ariel Behar	(Bosnia and Herzegovina) Tomislav Brkić (Serbia) Nikola Ćaćić	3–6, 5–7
Win	2–1	Apr 2021	Andalucía Open, Spain	250 Series	Clay	(Uruguay) Ariel Behar	(Bosnia and Herzegovina) Tomislav Brkić (Serbia) Nikola Ćaćić	6–2, 6–4
Loss	2–2	Apr 2021	Serbia Open, Serbia	250 Series	Clay	(Uruguay) Ariel Behar	(Croatia) Ivan Sabanov (Croatia) Matej Sabanov	3–6, 6–7^{(5–7)}
Loss	2–3	Jun 2021	Stuttgart Open, Germany	250 Series	Grass	(Uruguay) Ariel Behar	(Brazil) Marcelo Demoliner (Mexico) Santiago González	6–4, 3–6, [8–10]
Loss	2–4	Jan 2022	Adelaide International, Australia	250 Series	Hard	(Uruguay) Ariel Behar	(Netherlands) Wesley Koolhof (United Kingdom) Neal Skupski	6–7^{(5–7)}, 4–6
Win	3–4	Apr 2022	Serbia Open, Serbia	250 Series	Clay	(Uruguay) Ariel Behar	(Croatia) Nikola Mektić (Croatia) Mate Pavić	6–2, 3–6, [10–7]
Loss	3–5	Jun 2022	Mallorca Championships, Spain	250 Series	Grass	(Uruguay) Ariel Behar	(Brazil) Rafael Matos (Spain) David Vega Hernández	6–7^{(5–7)}, 7–6^{(8–6)}, [1–10]
Loss	3–6	Jun 2023	Rosmalen Championships, Netherlands	250 Series	Grass	(Kazakhstan) Aleksandr Nedovyesov	(Netherlands) Wesley Koolhof (United Kingdom) Neal Skupski	6–7^{(1–7)}, 2–6
Win	4–6	Jul 2023	Swedish Open, Sweden	250 Series	Clay	(Kazakhstan) Aleksandr Nedovyesov	(Portugal) Francisco Cabral (Brazil) Rafael Matos	6–2, 6–2
Loss	4–7	Aug 2023	Austrian Open Kitzbühel, Austria	250 Series	Clay	(Kazakhstan) Aleksandr Nedovyesov	(Austria) Alexander Erler (Austria) Lucas Miedler	4–6, 4–6
Win	5–7	Nov 2023	Sofia Open, Bulgaria	250 Series	Hard (i)	(Kazakhstan) Aleksandr Nedovyesov	(United Kingdom) Julian Cash (Croatia) Nikola Mektić	6–3, 3–6, [13–11]
Loss	5–8	Feb 2024	Los Cabos Open, Mexico	250 Series	Hard	(Kazakhstan) Aleksandr Nedovyesov	(Australia) Max Purcell (Australia) Jordan Thompson	5–7, 6–7^{(2–7)}
Win	6–8	Apr 2024	Estoril Open, Portugal	250 Series	Clay	(Kazakhstan) Aleksandr Nedovyesov	(France) Sadio Doumbia (France) Fabien Reboul	7–5, 6–2

== Challenger and Futures finals ==
=== Singles: 14 (6–8) ===
Legend (singles) ATP Challenger Tour (0–1) ITF Futures Tour (6–7)	Titles by surface Hard (2–5) Clay (4–3) Grass (0–0) Carpet (0–0)

Result	W–L	Date	Tournament	Tier	Surface	Opponent	Score
Loss	0–1	Aug 2009	Ecuador F1, Guayaquil	Futures	Hard	(Ecuador) Emilio Gómez	3–6, 2–6
Loss	0–2	Aug 2013	Ecuador F1, Guayaquil	Futures	Clay	(Ecuador) Emilio Gómez	5–7, 6–7^{(3–7)}
Win	1–2	Aug 2014	Ecuador F1, Guayaquil	Futures	Clay	(Ecuador) Roberto Quiroz	6–2, 6–2
Win	2–2	Aug 2014	Ecuador F2, Guayaquil	Futures	Hard	(Ecuador) Iván Endara	6–3, 7–5
Win	3–2	Aug 2014	Ecuador F3, Quito	Futures	Clay	(United States) Jean-Yves Aubone	4–6, 7–6^{(7–5)}, 6–3
Win	4–2	Sep 2014	Ecuador F5, Quito	Futures	Clay	(Peru) Mauricio Echazú	6–2, 6–1
Loss	4–3	Oct 2014	Peru F8, Lima	Futures	Clay	(Peru) Duilio Beretta	0–6, 4–6
Win	5–3	Aug 2015	Canada F7, Winnipeg	Futures	Hard	(South Africa) Fritz Wolmarans	7–6^{(7–4)}, 6–0
Loss	5–4	Sep 2015	Canada F8, Calgary	Futures	Hard	(Canada) Frank Dancevic	4–6, 3–6
Win	6–4	May 2017	Italy F14, Frascati	Futures	Clay	(Croatia) Viktor Galović	6–1, 6–2
Loss	6–5	Sep 2017	Bolivia F1, La Paz	Futures	Clay	(Argentina) Juan Ignacio Galarza	6–6 ret.
Loss	6–6	Dec 2017	Mexico F7, Metepec	Futures	Hard	(Switzerland) Marc-Andrea Hüsler	3–6, 4–6
Loss	6–7	Dec 2017	Mexico F8, Cancún	Futures	Hard	(Monaco) Lucas Catarina	4–6, 6–7^{(2–7)}
Loss	6–8	Feb 2019	Morelos, Mexico	Challenger	Hard	(Argentina) Matías Franco Descotte	1–6, 4–6

=== Doubles: 53 (30–23) ===
Legend (doubles) ATP Challenger Tour (22–17) ITF Futures Tour (8–6)	Titles by surface Hard (13–8) Clay (16–15) Grass (1–0) Carpet (0–0)

Result	W–L	Date	Tournament	Tier	Surface	Partner	Opponents	Score
Loss	0–1	Jun 2014	USA F17, Oklahoma City	Futures	Hard	(Venezuela) Jesús Bandrés	(United States) Mackenzie McDonald (United States) Martin Redlicki	6–4, 6–7^{(3–7)}, [8–10]
Win	1–1	Aug 2014	Ecuador F1, Guayaquil	Futures	Clay	(United States) Jean-Yves Aubone	(Ecuador) Iván Endara (Brazil) Caio Silva	7–6^{(8–6)}, 6–2
Win	2–1	Aug 2014	Ecuador F3, Quito	Futures	Clay	(Peru) Rodrigo Sánchez	(Brazil) Caio Silva (Brazil) Thales Turini	6–1, 6–0
Win	3–1	Oct 2014	Peru F8, Lima	Futures	Clay	(Ecuador) Emilio Gómez	(Brazil) Eduardo Dischinger (Brazil) Tiago Lopes	6–3, 6–2
Loss	3–2	Aug 2015	Canada F7, Winnipeg	Futures	Hard	(Japan) Sora Fukuda	(Venezuela) Luis David Martínez (Mexico) Luis Patiño	4–6, 3–6
Win	4–2	May 2016	USA F16, Tampa	Futures	Clay	(Ecuador) Roberto Quiroz	(Serbia) Miomir Kecmanović (Germany) Jonas Lütjen	6–4, 7–6^{(7–4)}
Loss	4–3	Sep 2016	Barranquilla, Colombia	Challenger	Clay	(Ecuador) Roberto Quiroz	(Colombia) Alejandro Falla (Colombia) Eduardo Struvay	4–6, 5–7
Loss	4–4	Nov 2016	Bogotá, Colombia	Challenger	Clay	(Uruguay) Ariel Behar	(El Salvador) Marcelo Arévalo (Peru) Sergio Galdós	4–6, 1–6
Loss	4–5	Jan 2017	USA F5, Weston	Futures	Clay	(Venezuela) Luis David Martínez	(Argentina) Facundo Argüello (Argentina) Juan Ignacio Londero	4–6, 7–6^{(7–1)}, [12–14]
Loss	4–6	Jun 2017	Italy F15, Reggio Emilia	Futures	Clay	(United States) Alexander Centenari	(Poland) Grzegorz Panfil (Croatia) Ante Pavić	1–6, 6–7^{(4–7)}
Loss	4–7	Nov 2017	Mexico F6, Monterrey	Futures	Hard	(Bolivia) Federico Zeballos	(Switzerland) Marc-Andrea Hüsler (Switzerland) Jessy Kalambay	6–7^{(5–7)}, 4–6
Win	5–7	Dec 2017	Mexico F7, Metepec	Futures	Hard	(Mexico) Manuel Sánchez	(United States) John Paul Fruttero (United States) Thai-Son Kwiatkowski	6–3, 6–3
Win	6–7	Dec 2017	Mexico F8, Cancún	Futures	Hard	(Brazil) Bruno Sant'Anna	(Bolivia) Boris Arias (Bolivia) Federico Zeballos	1–6, 6–3, [10–4]
Win	7–7	Mar 2018	Croatia F2, Poreč	Futures	Clay	(Brazil) Bruno Sant'Anna	(Croatia) Ivan Sabanov (Croatia) Matej Sabanov	6–4, 5–7, [11–9]
Win	8–7	Apr 2018	León, Mexico	Challenger	Hard	(Mexico) Manuel Sánchez	(Australia) Bradley Mousley (Australia) John-Patrick Smith	6–4, 6–4
Loss	8–8	Jun 2018	Romania F2, Bacău	Futures	Clay	(Hungary) Gábor Borsos	(Argentina) Franco Agamenone (Argentina) Hernán Casanova	2–6, 3–6
Loss	8–9	Jul 2018	Milan, Italy	Challenger	Clay	(Brazil) Fernando Romboli	(Italy) Julian Ocleppo (Italy) Andrea Vavassori	6–4, 1–6, [9–11]
Loss	8–10	Jul 2018	Recanati, Italy	Challenger	Hard	(Brazil) Fernando Romboli	(China) Gong Maoxin (China) Zhang Ze	6–2, 6–7^{(5–7)}, [8–10]
Win	9–10	Aug 2018	Italy F21, Bolzano	Futures	Clay	(Argentina) Hernán Casanova	(Brazil) Wilson Leite (Brazil) Bruno Sant'Anna	7–5, 6–2
Loss	9–11	Sep 2018	Columbus, USA	Challenger	Hard (i)	(Ecuador) Roberto Quiroz	(Canada) Peter Polansky (United States) Tommy Paul	3–6, 3–6
Loss	9–12	Oct 2018	Lima, Peru	Challenger	Clay	(Uruguay) Ariel Behar	(Argentina) Guido Andreozzi (Argentina) Guillermo Durán	6–2, 6–7^{(5–7)}, [5–10]
Loss	9–13	Feb 2019	Morelos, Mexico	Challenger	Hard	(Venezuela) Luis David Martínez	(Sweden) André Göransson (Switzerland) Marc-Andrea Hüsler	3–6, 6–3, [9–11]
Loss	9–14	May 2019	Puerto Vallarta, Mexico	Challenger	Hard	(Venezuela) Luis David Martínez	(Australia) Matt Reid (Australia) John-Patrick Smith	6–7^{(10–12)}, 3–6
Win	10–14	May 2019	Jerusalem, Israel	Challenger	Hard	(Uruguay) Ariel Behar	(United States) Evan King (Italy) Julian Ocleppo	6–4, 7–6^{(7–5)}
Loss	10–15	Jun 2019	Parma, Italy	Challenger	Clay	(Uruguay) Ariel Behar	(Lithuania) Laurynas Grigelis (Italy) Andrea Pellegrino	6–1, 3–6, [7–10]
Win	11–15	Jul 2019	Prague, Czech Republic	Challenger	Clay	(Uruguay) Ariel Behar	(Kazakhstan) Andrey Golubev (Kazakhstan) Aleksandr Nedovyesov	6–7^{(4–7)}, 7–5, [10–8]
Win	12–15	Sep 2019	Genoa, Italy	Challenger	Clay	(Uruguay) Ariel Behar	(Argentina) Guido Andreozzi (Argentina) Andrés Molteni	3–6, 6–4, [10–3]
Win	13–15	Oct 2019	Santo Domingo, Dominican Republic	Challenger	Clay	(Uruguay) Ariel Behar	(Brazil) Orlando Luz (Venezuela) Luis David Martínez	6–7^{(5–7)}, 6–4, [12–10]
Win	14–15	Oct 2019	Lima, Peru	Challenger	Clay	(Uruguay) Ariel Behar	(Brazil) Felipe Meligeni Alves (Venezuela) Luis David Martínez	2–6, 6–2, [3–10]
Win	15–15	Nov 2019	Guayaquil, Ecuador	Challenger	Clay	(Uruguay) Ariel Behar	(Brazil) Pedro Sakamoto (Brazil) Thiago Seyboth Wild	7–6^{(7–4)}, 7–6^{(7–5)}
Loss	15–16	Nov 2019	Houston, USA	Challenger	Hard	(Uruguay) Ariel Behar	(Israel) Jonathan Erlich (Mexico) Santiago González	3–6, 6–7^{(4–7)}
Win	16–16	Jan 2020	Bangkok, Thailand	Challenger	Hard	(Mexico) Miguel Ángel Reyes-Varela	(China) Zhang Ze (China) Gong Maoxin	6-3, 6–3
Win	17–16	Jan 2020	Newport Beach, USA	Challenger	Hard	(Uruguay) Ariel Behar	(Croatia) Antonio Šančić (Austria) Tristan-Samuel Weissborn	6–2, 6–4
Loss	17–17	Sep 2020	Aix-en-Provence, France	Challenger	Clay	(Uruguay) Ariel Behar	(Argentina) Andrés Molteni (Monaco) Hugo Nys	4–6, 6–7^{(4–7)}
Loss	17–18	Oct 2020	Parma, Italy	Challenger	Clay	(Uruguay) Ariel Behar	(El Salvador) Marcelo Arévalo (Bosnia and Herzegovina) Tomislav Brkić	4–6, 4–6
Win	18–18	Oct 2020	Istanbul, Turkey	Challenger	Hard	(Uruguay) Ariel Behar	(United States) Robert Galloway (United States) Nathaniel Lammons	4–6, 6–3, [10–7]
Win	19–18	June 2023	Ilkley, UK	Challenger	Grass	(Kazakhstan) Aleksandr Nedovyesov	(United States) Robert Galloway (Australia) John-Patrick Smith	2–6, 7–5, [11–9]
Win	20–18	Mar 2024	Girona, Spain	Challenger	Clay	(Kazakhstan) Aleksandr Nedovyesov	(France) Jonathan Eysseric (France) Albano Olivetti	7–6^{(7–1)}, 6–4
Loss	20–19	Jul 2024	Braunschweig, Germany	Challenger	Clay	(India) Sriram Balaji	(Netherlands) Sander Arends (Netherlands) Robin Haase	6–4, 4–6, [8–10]
Win	21–19	Mar 2025	Punta Cana, Dominican Republic	Challenger	Hard	(Ecuador) Diego Hidalgo	(Czech Republic) Petr Nouza (Czech Republic) Patrik Rikl	7–6^{(7–5)}, 6–4
Win	22–19	Mar 2025	Morelia, Mexico	Challenger	Hard	(Ecuador) Diego Hidalgo	(Switzerland) Marc-Andrea Hüsler (Italy) Stefano Napolitano	6–4, 4–6, [10–3]
Win	23–19	Oct 2025	Antofagasta, Chile	Challenger	Clay	(Mexico) Miguel Ángel Reyes-Varela	(Brazil) Luís Britto (Brazil) Matheus Pucinelli de Almeida	6–3, 4–6, [10–6]
Loss	23–20	Oct 2025	Curitiba, Brazil	Challenger	Clay	(Mexico) Miguel Ángel Reyes-Varela	(Chile) Matías Soto (Bolivia) Federico Zeballos	4–6, 5–7
Loss	23–21	Oct 2025	Sauipe, Brazil	Challenger	Clay	(Mexico) Miguel Ángel Reyes-Varela	(Brazil) Luís Miguel (Brazil) Eduardo Ribeiro	6–7^{(4–7)}, 6–4, [5–10]
Win	24–21	Oct 2025	Lima, Peru	Challenger	Clay	(Mexico) Miguel Ángel Reyes-Varela	(Argentina) Federico Agustín Gómez (Venezuela) Luis David Martínez	6–4, 6–4
Loss	24–22	Nov 2025	Montevideo, Uruguay	Challenger	Clay	(Mexico) Miguel Ángel Reyes-Varela	(Argentina) Facundo Mena (Mexico) Rodrigo Pacheco Méndez	6–3, 3–6, [9–11]
Win	25–22	Jan 2026	Concepción, Chile	Challenger	Clay	(Brazil) Eduardo Ribeiro	(Argentina) Mariano Kestelboim (Brazil) Marcelo Zormann	7–6^{(7–4)}, 6–4
Win	26–22	Mar 2026	Zadar, Croatia	Challenger	Clay	(Croatia) Nino Serdarušić	(Italy) Simone Agostini (Czech Republic) Jonáš Forejtek	6–1, 6–2
Loss	26–23	Jul 2026	Bogotá, Colombia	Challenger	Clay	(Argentina) Facundo Mena	(Chile) Matías Soto (Bolivia) Federico Zeballos	4–6, 6–2, [9–11]
Win	27–23	Aug 2026	Lexington, USA	Challenger	Hard	(India) Niki Kaliyanda Poonacha	(United States) Andre Ilagan (United States) Karl Poling	6–7^{(1–7)}, 6–3, [11–9]
Win	28–23	Aug 2026	Brownsburg, USA	Challenger	Hard	(India) Niki Kaliyanda Poonacha	(United States) Robert Cash (Netherlands) Bart Stevens	6–4, 6–1
Win	29–23	Sep 2026	Jingshan, China	Challenger	Hard	(India) Niki Kaliyanda Poonacha	(Mexico) Miguel Ángel Reyes-Varela (United States) Reese Stalder	7–5, 6–2
Win	30–23	Oct 2026	Brest, France	Challenger	Hard (i)	(India) Niki Kaliyanda Poonacha	(India) Sriram Balaji (United States) Evan King	7–6^{(7–4)}, 6–7^{(4–7)}, [10–7]
