= Antofagasta Challenger =

- 2025 Antofagasta Challenger

ATP Challenger Tour
- Event name: Challenger Dove Men+Care Antofagasta
- Location: Antofagasta, Chile
- Category: ATP Challenger Tour (2025-), Challenger 100 (2023-2024)
- Surface: Clay

Current champions (2024)
- Singles: (Argentina) Juan Manuel Cerúndolo
- Doubles: (Brazil) Mateus Alves (Chile) Matías Soto

The Challenger Dove Men+Care Antofagasta is a professional tennis tournament played on clay courts. It is currently part of the ATP Challenger Tour. It is held in Antofagasta, Chile since 2023.

== Past finals ==
=== Singles ===
Year	Champion	Runner-up	Score
2026	(Brazil) João Lucas Reis da Silva	(Brazil) Thiago Seyboth Wild	7–6^{(7–2)}, 1–6, 6–2
2025	(Chile) Cristian Garín	(Argentina) Facundo Díaz Acosta	2–6, 6–3, 6–3
2024	(Argentina) Juan Manuel Cerúndolo	(Paraguay) Daniel Vallejo	3–6, 6–2, 6–4
2023	(Argentina) Camilo Ugo Carabelli	(United States) Tristan Boyer	3–6, 6–1, 7–5

=== Doubles ===
Year	Champions	Runners-up	Score
2026	(Brazil) Eduardo Ribeiro (Brazil) Marcelo Zormann	(Mexico) Alan Magadán (Peru) Alexander Merino	6–1, 6–3
2025	(Ecuador) Gonzalo Escobar (Mexico) Miguel Ángel Reyes-Varela	(Brazil) Luís Britto (Brazil) Matheus Pucinelli de Almeida	6–3, 4–6, [10–6]
2024	(Brazil) Mateus Alves (Chile) Matías Soto	(Argentina) Leonardo Aboian (Argentina) Valerio Aboian	6–1, 6–4
2023	(Bolivia) Boris Arias (Bolivia) Federico Zeballos	(Italy) Luciano Darderi (Bolivia) Murkel Dellien	5–7, 6–4, [10–8]
