= Alan Magadán =

Mexican tennis player (born 2001)

- Country (sports): Mexico
- Born: 26 May 2001 (age 25) Zacatecas, Mexico
- Height: 1.83 m (6 ft 0 in)
- Plays: Right-handed (two-handed backhand)
- College: UTSA; Texas A&M; Oklahoma
- Coach: Eduardo Magadan
- Prize money: US $96,633

Singles
- Career record: 0–2 (at ATP Tour level, Grand Slam level, and in Davis Cup)
- Career titles: 0
- Highest ranking: No. 452 (16 November 2026)
- Current ranking: No. 452 (16 November 2026)

Doubles
- Career record: 0–2 (at ATP Tour level, Grand Slam level, and in Davis Cup)
- Career titles: 0
- Highest ranking: No. 178 (9 November 2026)
- Current ranking: No. 198 (16 November 2026)
- Last updated on: 16 November 2026.

Alan Magadán (born 26 May 2001) is a Mexican tennis player. He has a career high ATP singles ranking of world No. 452 achieved on 16 November 2026 and a career high ATP doubles ranking of No. 178 achieved on 9 November 2026.

== College career ==
Magadán played college tennis at UTSA before transferring to Texas A&M. He later transferred to Oklahoma.

== Career ==
=== 2025: ATP debut ===
Magadán made his ATP Tour debut at the 2025 Los Cabos Open after qualifying for the main draw, having entered the tournament as an alternate. He became the first Mexican in 26 years to qualify for an ATP event and for the first time in the nine editions of the tournament in Los Cabos there were four Mexicans in the singles main draw. He lost in the first round to sixth seed Yunchaokete Bu.
