= João Lucas Reis da Silva =

Brazilian tennis player (born 2000)

- Reis da Silva at the 2026 Wimbledon Championships
- Country (sports): Brazil
- Born: 26 March 2000 (age 26) Recife, Brazil
- Height: 1.78 m (5 ft 10 in)
- Plays: Right-handed (two-handed backhand)
- Coach: João Zwetsch
- Prize money: US $515,568

Singles
- Career record: 0–2
- Career titles: 2 Challenger
- Highest ranking: No. 177 (2 November 2026)
- Current ranking: No. 177 (2 November 2026)

Grand Slam singles results
- Australian Open: Q1 (2026)
- French Open: Q2 (2026)
- Wimbledon: Q1 (2026)
- US Open: Q1 (2025)

Doubles
- Career record: 0–0
- Career titles: 2 Challenger
- Highest ranking: No. 204 (13 November 2023)
- Current ranking: No. 493 (2 November 2026)
- Last updated on: 2 November 2026.

João Lucas Reis da Silva (born 26 March 2000) is a Brazilian professional tennis player. He has a career-high ATP singles ranking of No. 177 achieved on 2 November 2026 and a doubles ranking of No. 204 reached on 13 November 2023. He is currently the No. 4 singles player from Brazil.

== Early life ==
João Lucas Reis da Silva was born on March 26, 2000, in Recife, Pernambuco, Brazil. He began playing tennis at the age of three, inspired by his older brother, who also competed at the junior level. At the age of 10, he started competing in national tournaments. At 13, Reis da Silva relocated to São Paulo to advance his training, where he lived and trained for seven years before eventually moving to Rio de Janeiro.

== Career ==
Reis da Silva competed in junior Grand Slam events. He had good results on the ITF junior circuit, maintaining a 104–68 singles win-loss record and reached an ITF junior combined ranking of No. 30 on 1 January 2018.

In 2023, Reis da Silva won his first ATP Challenger doubles title at the 2023 Challenger de Santiago with Pedro Boscardin Dias.

In December 2024, Reis da Silva won the Procopio Cup in São Paulo by defeating Daniel Dutra da Silva, securing a spot in the 2025 Rio Open qualifying rounds. This was his first tournament win in four years, following a period marked by injuries.

He also played in the 2026 Rio Open, which made him the first openly gay man to compete in a main draw of an ATP match.

In April 2026, Reis da Silva reached his sixth Challenger final in Tallahassee, but lost to Clément Tabur.

In September 2026, he reached another Challenger final at the NÖ Open and lost to Mika Brunold, in the first match in tennis history to pit two openly gay male professional players against each other.

In October 2026, Reis da Silva won the biggest title of his career, defeating fellow countryman Thiago Seyboth Wild in the final of the 2026 Antofagasta Challenger.

== Personal life ==
Reis da Silva came out to his family and friends as gay five years before publicly sharing his identity in December 2024; publicly coming out made him the first out gay active professional male tennis player. He is in a relationship with Brazilian actor and model Gui Sampaio Ricardo. Reis da Silva stated that accepting his identity improved his relationships with those around him, including his coaches and parents.

Reis da Silva considers his return of serve and backhand as his strengths.

== Performance timeline ==
Key
W	F	SF	QF	#R	RR	Q#	DNQ	A	NH

(W) winner; (F) finalist; (SF) semifinalist; (QF) quarterfinalist; (#R) rounds 4, 3, 2, 1; (RR) round-robin stage; (Q#) qualification round; (DNQ) did not qualify; (A) absent; (NH) not held; (SR) strike rate (events won / competed); (W–L) win–loss record.
To avoid confusion and double counting, these charts are updated at the conclusion of a tournament or when the player's participation has ended.

=== Singles ===
Tournament	2025	2026	SR	W–L	Win %
Grand Slam tournaments
Australian Open	A	Q1	0 / 0	0–0	–
French Open	A	Q2	0 / 0	0–0	–
Wimbledon	A	Q1	0 / 0	0–0	–
US Open	Q1	A	0 / 0	0–0	–
Win–loss	0–0	0–0	0 / 0	0–0	–
ATP Masters 1000
Indian Wells Open	A	A	0 / 0	0–0	–
Miami Open	A	A	0 / 0	0–0	–
Monte-Carlo Masters	A	A	0 / 0	0–0	–
Madrid Open	A	A	0 / 0	0-0	–
Italian Open	A	A	0 / 0	0–0	–
Canadian Open	A	A	0 / 0	0–0	–
Cincinnati Open	A	A	0 / 0	0–0	–
Shanghai Masters	A		0 / 0	0–0	–
Paris Masters	A		0 / 0	0–0	–
Win–loss	0–0	0–0	0 / 0	0–0	–

== ATP Challenger Tour finals ==
=== Singles: 8 (2 titles, 6 runner-ups) ===
Legend ATP Challenger Tour (2–6)	Finals by surface Clay (2–6)

Result	W–L	Date	Tournament	Tier	Surface	Opponent	Score
Loss	0–1	Oct 2022	Ambato La Gran Ciudad, Ecuador	Challenger	Clay	(Argentina) Facundo Bagnis	6–7^{(7–9)}, 4–6
Loss	0–2	May 2023	Challenger Coquimbo, Chile	Challenger	Clay	(Brazil) Matheus Pucinelli de Almeida	6–7^{(1–7)}, 7–6^{(7–4)}, 4–6
Loss	0–3	Apr 2024	Engie Open Florianópolis, Brazil	Challenger	Clay	(France) Enzo Couacaud	6–3, 4–6, 6–7^{(1–7)}
Win	1–3	Jun 2025	Challenger Santa Fe, Argentina	Challenger	Clay	(Argentina) Lautaro Midón	6–4, 6–3
Loss	1–4	Nov 2025	IGMA Open, Peru	Challenger	Clay	(Chile) Tomás Barrios Vera	6–7^{(5–7)}, 6–7^{(3–7)}
Loss	1–5	Apr 2026	Tallahassee Tennis Challenger, US	Challenger	Clay	(France) Clément Tabur	4–6, 0–1 ret.
Loss	1–6	Sep 2026	NÖ Open, Austria	Challenger	Clay	(Switzerland) Mika Brunold	4–6, 3–6
Win	2–6	Oct 2026	Antofagasta Challenger, Chile	Challenger	Clay	(Brazil) Thiago Seyboth Wild	7–6^{(7–2)}, 1–6, 6–2

=== Doubles: 6 (2 titles, 4 runner-ups) ===
Legend ATP Challenger Tour (2–4)	Finals by surface Hard (–) Clay (2–4)

Result	W–L	Date	Tournament	Tier	Surface	Partner	Opponents	Score
Loss	0–1	Nov 2022	São Léo Open, Brazil	Challenger	Clay	(Brazil) Felipe Meligeni Alves	(Argentina) Guido Andreozzi (Argentina) Guillermo Durán	1–5 ret.
Win	1–1	Mar 2023	Challenger de Santiago, Chile	Challenger	Clay	(Brazil) Pedro Boscardin Dias	(Ecuador) Diego Hidalgo (Colombia) Cristian Rodríguez	6–4, 3–6, [10–7]
Loss	1–2	Aug 2024	Open Bogotá, Colombia	Challenger	Clay	(Zimbabwe) Benjamin Lock	(New Zealand) Finn Reynolds (Chile) Matías Soto	3–6, 4–6
Win	2–2	Jan 2025	Punta Open, Uruguay	Challenger	Clay	(Brazil) Gustavo Heide	(Argentina) Facundo Mena (Argentina) Marco Trungelliti	6–2, 6–3
Loss	2–3	Sep 2025	Buenos Aires Challenger, Argentina	Challenger	Clay	(Brazil) Pedro Boscardin Dias	(Argentina) Guillermo Durán (Argentina) Mariano Kestelboim	6–7^{(3–7)}, 1–6
Loss	2–4	Mar 2026	LA Open, Brazil	Challenger	Clay	(Brazil) Felipe Meligeni Alves	(Brazil) Gustavo Heide (Brazil) Guto Miguel	4–6, 2–6

== ITF Tour finals ==
=== Singles: 9 (4 titles, 5 runner-ups) ===
Legend ITF Futures/WTT (4–5)	Finals by surface Hard (2–1) Clay (2–4)

Result	W–L	Date	Tournament	Tier	Surface	Opponent	Score
Win	1–0	May 2018	Brazil F4, Curitiba	Futures	Clay	(Brazil) Thiago Seyboth Wild	6–7^{(1–7)}, 6–3, 6–2
Loss	1–1	Aug 2019	M15 Lambaré, Paraguay	WTT	Clay	(Argentina) Gonzalo Villanueva	1–6, 3–6
Win	2–1	Nov 2019	M15 Cancún, Mexico	WTT	Hard	(Northern Mariana Islands) Colin Sinclair	6–2, 6–4
Loss	2–2	Nov 2019	M15 Cancún, Mexico	WTT	Hard	(United Kingdom) Paul Jubb	6–7^{(3–7)}, 0–6
Win	3–2	Feb 2020	M15 Cancún, Mexico	WTT	Hard	(Argentina) Maximiliano Estévez	7–6^{(13–11)}, 6–1
Loss	3–3	Sep 2021	M25 Medellín, Colombia	WTT	Clay	(Brazil) Gilbert Klier Jr.	2–6, 2–6
Loss	3–4	Aug 2022	M25 Guayaquil, Ecuador	WTT	Clay	(Chile) Gonzalo Lama	4–6, 6–2, 2–6
Loss	3–5	Aug 2022	M15 Recife, Brazil	WTT	Clay (i)	(Brazil) Eduardo Ribeiro	6–3, 3–6, 4–6
Win	4–5	May 2025	M25 Coquimbo, Chile	WTT	Clay	(Argentina) Luciano Emanuel Ambrogi	6–2, 7–6^{(8–6)}

=== Doubles: 11 (7 titles, 4 runner-ups) ===
Legend ITF Futures/WTT (7–4)	Finals by surface Hard (2–0) Clay (5–4)

Result	W–L	Date	Tournament	Tier	Surface	Partner	Opponents	Score
Win	1–0	Jul 2018	Lithuania F1, Vilnius	Futures	Clay	(Brazil) Matheus Pucinelli de Almeida	(Netherlands) Marc Dijkhuizen (Netherlands) Bart Stevens	6–2, 6–2
Win	2–0	Jun 2019	M15 Balatonalmadi, Hungary	WTT	Clay	(Brazil) Matheus Pucinelli de Almeida	(Austria) Lenny Hampel (Austria) Neil Oberleitner	6–4, 7–6^{(7–1)}
Loss	2–1	Jul 2019	M15 The Hague, Netherlands	WTT	Clay	(Netherlands) Michiel de Krom	(Netherlands) Ryan Nijboer (Netherlands) Jesper de Jong	1–6, 4–6
Win	3–1	Nov 2020	M15 Quinta do Lago, Portugal	WTT	Hard	(Brazil) Matheus Pucinelli de Almeida	(United Kingdom) Jonathan Binding (Poland) Yann Wojcik	7–6^{(7–3)}, 6–1
Loss	3–2	Mar 2021	M15 Antalya, Turkey	WTT	Clay	(Brazil) Matheus Pucinelli de Almeida	(Argentina) Matias Zukas (Italy) Raúl Brancaccio	5–7, 5–7
Loss	3–3	Apr 2021	M15 Villa María, Argentina	WTT	Clay	(Brazil) Matheus Pucinelli de Almeida	(Argentina) Mateo Nicolás Martínez (Argentina) Gonzalo Villanueva	3–6, 3–6
Win	4–3	May 2021	M15 Brčko, Bosnia and Herzegovina	WTT	Clay	(Brazil) Gilbert Klier Jr.	(Switzerland) Rémy Bertola (Austria) Maximilian Neuchrist	walkover
Win	5–3	May 2021	M25 Kiseljak, Bosnia and Herzegovina	WTT	Clay	(Netherlands) Jelle Sels	(Brazil) Gilbert Klier Jr. (Brazil) Matheus Pucinelli de Almeida	4–6, 6–4, [10–4]
Loss	5–4	May 2021	M15 Sarajevo, Bosnia and Herzegovina	WTT	Clay	(Brazil) Gilbert Klier Jr.	(Croatia) Domagoj Bilješko (Croatia) Frane Ninčević	2–6, 6–3, [4–10]
Win	6–4	Sep 2021	M25 Medellín, Colombia	WTT	Clay	(Brazil) Gilbert Klier Jr.	(Brazil) Pedro Boscardin Dias (Brazil) Gustavo Heide	6–4, 4–6, [10–8]
Win	7–4	Jun 2022	M25 Santo Domingo, Dominican Republic	WTT	Hard	(France) Dan Added	(United States) Jake Bhangdia (United States) Gabriel Evans	6–4, 6–3
