= Eduardo Ribeiro (tennis) =

Brazilian tennis player (born 1998)

- Country (sports): Brazil
- Born: 17 March 1998 (age 28) Santa Cruz do Sul, Brazil
- Height: 1.78 m (5 ft 10 in)
- Plays: Right-handed (two-handed backhand)
- Coach: Patricio Arnold
- Prize money: US $190,749

Singles
- Career record: 0–0
- Career titles: 6 ITF
- Highest ranking: No. 316 (17 July 2023)
- Current ranking: No. 355 (19 October 2026)

Doubles
- Career record: 0–0
- Career titles: 4 Challenger, 7 ITF
- Highest ranking: No. 112 (19 October 2026)
- Current ranking: No. 112 (19 October 2026)
- Last updated on: 19 October 2026.

Eduardo Ribeiro (born 17 March 1998) is a Brazilian tennis player. Ribeiro has a career high ATP singles ranking of No. 316 achieved on 17 July 2023 and a career high ATP doubles ranking of No. 112 achieved on 19 October 2026.

Ribeiro has won 1 ATP Challenger doubles title at the 2023 Lima Challenger II with Mateus Alves.

== ATP Challenger Tour finals ==
=== Doubles: 9 (6 titles, 3 runner-ups) ===
Legend ATP Challenger Tour (6–3)

Result	W–L	Date	Tournament	Tier	Surface	Partner	Opponents	Score
Win	1–0	Nov 2023	Lima, Peru	Challenger	Clay	(Brazil) Mateus Alves	(Colombia) Nicolás Barrientos (Brazil) Orlando Luz	3–6, 7–5, [10–8]
Win	2–0	Oct 2025	Sauípe, Brazil	Challenger	Clay	(Brazil) Guto Miguel	(Ecuador) Gonzalo Escobar (Mexico) Miguel Ángel Reyes-Varela	7–6^{(7–4)}, 4–6, [10–5]
Win	3–0	Jan 2026	Itajaí, Brazil	Challenger	Clay	(Brazil) Igor Marcondes	(Brazil) Bruno Oliveira (Brazil) Matheus Pucinelli de Almeida	6–4, 6–4
Win	4–0	Jan 2026	Concepción, Chile	Challenger	Clay	(Ecuador) Gonzalo Escobar	(Argentina) Mariano Kestelboim (Brazil) Marcelo Zormann	7–6^{(7–4)}, 6–4
Win	5–0	Aug 2026	Plovdiv, Bulgaria	Challenger	Clay	(Brazil) João Victor Couto Loureiro	(Serbia) Tadija Radovanović (France) Cosme Rolland de Ravel	6–4, 6–2
Loss	5–1	Aug 2026	Augsburg, Germany	Challenger	Clay	(Argentina) Juan Manuel La Serna	(Czech Republic) Dominik Reček (Czech Republic) Daniel Siniakov	2–6, 3–6
Loss	5–2	Sep 2026	Curitiba, Brazil	Challenger	Clay	(Brazil) Guto Miguel	(Brazil) Marcelo Zormann (Argentina) Mariano Kestelboim	7–5, 6–7^{(3–7)}, [7–10]
Win	6–2	Oct 2026	Antofagasta, Chile	Challenger	Clay	(Brazil) Marcelo Zormann	(Mexico) Alan Magadán (Peru) Alexander Merino	6–1, 6–3
Loss	6–3	Oct 2026	Santa Cruz, Bolivia	Challenger	Clay	(Brazil) Guto Miguel	(Ecuador) Diego Hidalgo (Argentina) Mariano Kestelboim	6–1, 4–6, [8–10]

== ITF Futures/World Tennis Tour finals ==
=== Singles: 10 (6 titles, 4 runner-ups) ===
Legend ITF Futures/WTT (6–4)	Finals by surface Hard (0–2) Clay (6–2)

Result	W–L	Date	Tournament	Tier	Surface	Opponent	Score
Win	1–0	Aug 2022	M25 Recife, Brazil	WTT	Clay	(Brazil) João Lucas Reis da Silva	3–6, 6–3, 6–4
Win	2–0	Aug 2022	M15 Brasília, Brazil	WTT	Clay	(Italy) Lorenzo Gagliardo	6–2, 6–2
Win	3–0	Nov 2022	M25 Lajeado, Brazil	WTT	Clay	(Brazil) Marcelo Zormann	6–2, 6–2
Win	4–0	Aug 2023	M15 São Paulo, Brazil	WTT	Clay	(Chile) Daniel Antonio Núñez	6–4, 7–6^{(8–6)}
Loss	4–1	Aug 2024	M15 Huamantla, Mexico	WTT	Hard	(Dominican Republic) Peter Bertran	3–6, 5–7
Loss	4–2	Aug 2024	M25 Belém, Brazil	WTT	Hard	(Bolivia) Juan Carlos Prado Ángelo	4–6, 3–6
Loss	4–3	Nov 2024	M15 Recife, Brazil	WTT	Clay (i)	(Chile) Matías Soto	4–6, 2–6
Loss	4–4	Jul 2025	M15 Bucaramanga, Colombia	WTT	Clay	(Colombia) Johan Alexander Rodríguez	4–6, 6–4, 4-6
Win	5–4	Oct 2025	M15 Rio de Janeiro, Brazil	WTT	Clay	(Bolivia) Murkel Dellien	5–7, 6–2, 6-1
Win	6–4	Nov 2025	M15 Criciúma, Brazil	WTT	Clay	(Brazil) José Pereira	6–4, 6–3

=== Doubles: 8 (2 titles, 6 runner-ups) ===
Legend ITF Futures/WTT (2–6)	Finals by surface Hard (0–1) Clay (2–5)

Result	W–L	Date	Tournament	Tier	Surface	Partner	Opponents	Score
Win	1–0	Feb 2024	M25 Punta del Este, Uruguay	WTT	Clay	(Brazil) Daniel Dutra da Silva	(Argentina) Juan Bautista Otegui (Switzerland) Nicolás Parizzia	7–5, 3–6, [11–9]
Win	2–0	Aug 2024	M25 Londrina, Brazil	WTT	Clay	(Brazil) Gabriel Roveri Sidney	(Brazil) Fernando Yamacita (Brazil) Igor Gimenez	6–4, 6–3
Loss	2–1	Aug 2024	M25 Belém, Brazil	WTT	Hard	(Brazil) Gabriel Roveri Sidney	(Argentina) Ignacio Monzón (Argentina) Mateo del Pino	0–6, 6–3, [11–13]
Loss	2–2	Sep 2024	M25 Luque, Paraguay	WTT	Clay	(Brazil) Fernando Yamacita	(Brazil) Paulo A. Saraiva dos Santos (Brazil) Luís Britto	walkover
Loss	2–3	Nov 2024	M15 Recife, Brazil	WTT	Clay (i)	(Brazil) Kaue Noatto	(Brazil) João Victor Couto Loureiro (Brazil) Gilbert Klier Jr.	3–6, 4–6
Loss	2–4	Jul 2025	M25 Villavicencio, Colombia	WTT	Clay	(Brazil) João Victor Couto Loureiro	(Brazil) José Pereira (Brazil) Paulo André Saraiva dos Santos	3–6, 6–7^{(5–7)}
Loss	2–5	Oct 2025	M25 Lajeado, Brazil	WTT	Clay	(Brazil) Mateus Alves	(United States) Bruno Kuzuhara (Brazil) João Eduardo Schiessl	4–6, 7–6^{(7–4)}, [8–10]
Loss	2–6	Nov 2025	M25 Santa Cruz do Sul, Brazil	WTT	Clay	(Brazil) Mateus Alves	(Brazil) João Victor Couto Loureiro (Brazil) João Eduardo Schiessl	2–6, 3–6
