= Matheus Pucinelli de Almeida =

Brazilian tennis player

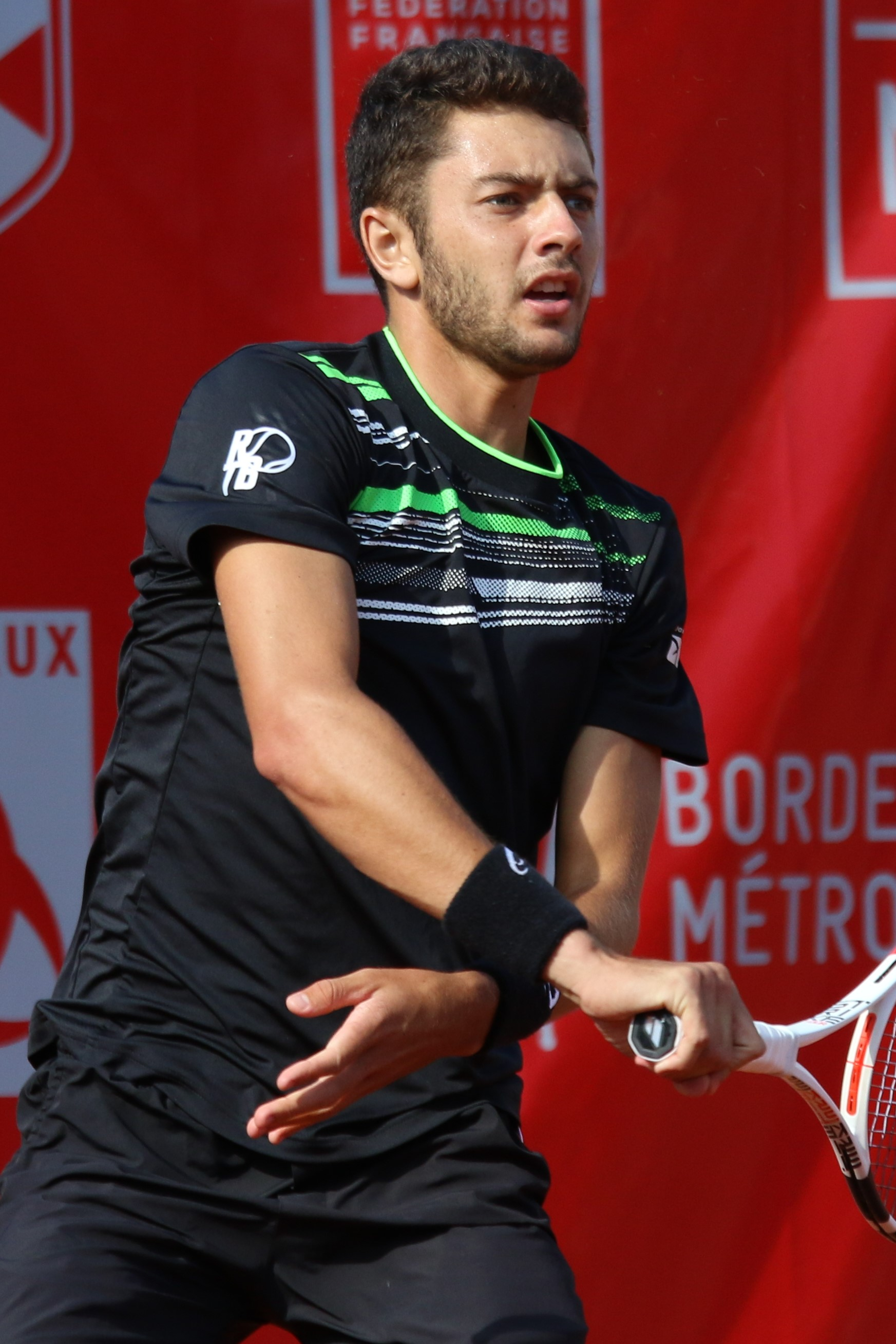
- Pucinelli de Almeida at the 2022 BNP Paribas Primrose Bordeaux
- Country (sports): Brazil
- Residence: Barueri, Brazil
- Born: 1 April 2001 (age 25) Campinas, Brazil
- Height: 1.83 m (6 ft 0 in)
- Plays: Right-Handed (two-handed backhand)
- Coach: Rafael Pacioaroni, João Zwetsch
- Prize money: US $379,262

Singles
- Career record: 3–4 (at ATP Tour level, Grand Slam level, and in Davis Cup)
- Career titles: 0
- Highest ranking: No. 190 (26 September 2022)
- Current ranking: No. 255 (5 October 2026)

Grand Slam singles results
- Australian Open: Q1 (2023)
- French Open: Q1 (2022)
- Wimbledon: Q2 (2022)
- US Open: Q1 (2022)

Doubles
- Career record: 0–0 (at ATP Tour level, Grand Slam level, and in Davis Cup)
- Career titles: 0
- Highest ranking: No. 251 (9 May 2022)
- Current ranking: No. 386 (5 October 2026)

Grand Slam doubles results
- French Open Junior: W (2019)
- Last updated on: 7 October 2026.

Matheus Pucinelli de Almeida (born 1 April 2001) is a Brazilian tennis player. He has a career high ATP singles ranking of World No. 190 achieved on 26 September 2022 and a career high ATP doubles ranking of World No. 251 achieved on 9 May 2022.

Pucinelli de Almeida won the 2019 French Open – Boys' doubles title.

== Career ==
Pucinelli de Almeida made his ATP main draw debut at the 2022 Chile Open after receiving entry from the qualifying draw.

== National representation ==
=== Davis Cup ===
Puccinelli was first nominated to play for Brazil in Davis Cup in September 2021 against Lebanon. Pucinelli made his debut in Davis Cup against Roey Tabet and won in straight sets which allowed the Brazilian team to confirm the 4–0 tie and advance into the 2022 Davis Cup qualifying round. Currently, Puccinelli sports a 1–0 record in Davis Cup matches. He has played only singles matches thus far.

All Davis Cup Matches: 1–0 (Singles: 1–0)
2020 Davis Cup World Group I
Round	Date	Opponent	Final match score	Location	Surface	Match	Opponent	Rubber Score
WGI	September 18–19, 2021	Lebanon	2–0	Jounieh	Clay	Singles 4	Roey Tabet	6–0, 6–1

== ATP Challenger Tour finals ==
=== Singles: 4 (3 titles, 1 runner-up) ===
Legend ATP Challenger Tour (3–1)	Finals by surface Hard (–) Clay (3–1)

Result	W–L	Date	Tournament	Tier	Surface	Opponent	Score
Loss	0–1	Sep 2022	Braga Open, Portugal	Challenger	Clay	(United States) Nicolas Moreno de Alboran	2–6, 4–6
Win	1–1	May 2023	Challenger de Coquimbo, Chile	Challenger	Clay	(Brazil) João Lucas Reis da Silva	7–6^{(7–1)}, 6–7^{(4–7)}, 6–4
Win	2–1	Jun 2026	Quito Challenger, Ecuador	Challenger	Clay	(Argentina) Hernán Casanova	5–7, 6–3, 6–2
Win	3–1	Oct 2026	Cali Open, Colombia	Challenger	Clay	(Argentina) Valerio Aboian	7–6^{(7–1)}, 6–3

=== Doubles: 4 (1 title, 3 runner-ups) ===
Legend ATP Challenger Tour (1–3)	Finals by surface Hard (–) Clay (1–3)

Result	W–L	Date	Tournament	Tier	Surface	Partner	Opponents	Score
Loss	0–1	Nov 2021	Internacional de Campinas, Brazil	Challenger	Clay	(Brazil) Gilbert Klier Jr.	(Brazil) Rafael Matos (Brazil) Felipe Meligeni Alves	3–6, 1–6
Win	1–1	Apr 2022	Mexico City Open, Mexico	Challenger	Clay	(Chile) Nicolás Jarry	(France) Jonathan Eysseric (New Zealand) Artem Sitak	6–2, 6–3
Loss	1–2	Sep 2025	Antofagasta Challenger, Chile	Challenger	Clay	(Brazil) Luís Britto	(Ecuador) Gonzalo Escobar (Mexico) Miguel Ángel Reyes-Varela	3–6, 6–4, [6–10]
Loss	1–3	Jan 2026	Itajaí Open, Brazil	Challenger	Clay	(Brazil) Bruno Oliveira	(Brazil) Igor Marcondes (Brazil) Eduardo Ribeiro	4–6, 4–6

== ITF Tour finals ==
=== Singles: 7 (5 titles, 2 runner-ups) ===
Legend ITF WTT (5–2)	Finals by surface Hard (–) Clay (5–2)

Result	W–L	Date	Tournament	Tier	Surface	Opponent	Score
Win	1–0	Mar 2021	M15 Antalya, Turkey	WTT	Clay	(Serbia) Miljan Zekić	6–4, 6–4
Loss	1–1	Mar 2021	M15 Antalya, Turkey	WTT	Clay	(Serbia) Miljan Zekić	1–6, 6–3, 4–6
Win	2–1	May 2021	M15 Cairo, Egypt	WTT	Clay	(Bulgaria) Simon Anthony Ivanov	7–5, 1–0 ret.
Win	3–1	May 2021	M25 Kiseljak, Bosnia and Herzegovina	WTT	Clay	(Italy) Francesco Forti	6–4, 2–6, 6–4
Loss	3–2	May 2021	M15 Sarajevo, Bosnia and Herzegovina	WTT	Clay	(Argentina) Hernán Casanova	2–6, 0–6
Win	4–2	Oct 2024	M25 Lajeado, Brazil	WTT	Clay	(Brazil) Daniel Dutra da Silva	6–2, 7–5
Win	5–2	Nov 2025	M25 Santa Cruz do Sul, Brazil	WTT	Clay	(Brazil) Pedro Boscardin Dias	7–6^{(7–2)}, 6–2

=== Doubles: 8 (3 titles, 5 runner-ups) ===
Legend ITF Futures/WTT (3–5)	Finals by surface Hard (1–1) Clay (2–4)

Result	W–L	Date	Tournament	Tier	Surface	Partner	Opponents	Score
Win	1–0	Jul 2018	Lithuania F1, Vilnius	Futures	Clay	(Brazil) João Lucas Reis da Silva	(Netherlands) Marc Dijkhuizen (Netherlands) Bart Stevens	6–2, 6–2
Win	2–0	Jun 2019	M15 Balatonalmadi, Hungary	WTT	Clay	(Brazil) João Lucas Reis da Silva	(Austria) Lenny Hampel (Austria) Neil Oberleitner	6–4, 7–6^{(7–1)}
Loss	2–1	Sep 2019	M15 Champaign, US	WTT	Hard	(Brazil) Alex Blumenberg	(United States) Zachary Svajda (Syria) Kareem Al Allaf	5–7, 6–7^{(3–7)}
Win	3–1	Nov 2020	M15 Quinta do Lago, Portugal	WTT	Hard	(Brazil) João Lucas Reis da Silva	(United Kingdom) Jonathan Binding (Poland) Yann Wojcik	7–6^{(7–3)}, 6–1
Loss	3–2	Mar 2021	M15 Antalya, Turkey	WTT	Clay	(Brazil) João Lucas Reis da Silva	(Argentina) Matias Zukas (Italy) Raúl Brancaccio	5–7, 5–7
Loss	3–3	Apr 2021	M15 Villa María, Argentina	WTT	Clay	(Brazil) João Lucas Reis da Silva	(Argentina) Mateo Nicolás Martínez (Argentina) Gonzalo Villanueva	3–6, 3–6
Loss	3–4	May 2021	M25 Kiseljak, Bosnia and Herzegovina	WTT	Clay	(Brazil) Gilbert Klier Jr.	(Brazil) João Lucas Reis da Silva (Netherlands) Jelle Sels	6–4, 4–6, [4–10]
Loss	3–5	Jul 2021	M25 Casinalbo, Italy	WTT	Clay	(Brazil) Pedro Sakamoto	(Italy) Alessandro Motti (Italy) Julian Ocleppo	3–6, 2–6

== Junior Grand Slam Finals ==
=== Doubles: 1 (title) ===
Result	Year	Tournament	Surface	Partner	Opponents	Score
Win	2019	French Open	Clay	(Argentina) Thiago Agustín Tirante	(Italy) Flavio Cobolli (Switzerland) Dominic Stricker	7–6^{(7–3)}, 6–4
