= 2023 Bratislava Open – Doubles =

Doubles
- 2023 Bratislava Open

Final
- Champions: (Uruguay) Ariel Behar (Czech Republic) Adam Pavlásek
- Runners-up: (Austria) Neil Oberleitner (Germany) Tim Sandkaulen
- Score: 6–4, 6–4

Events
Singles	Doubles
- Bratislava Open

Sriram Balaji and Jeevan Nedunchezhiyan were the defending champions but chose not to defend their title.

Ariel Behar and Adam Pavlásek won the title after defeating Neil Oberleitner and Tim Sandkaulen 6–4, 6–4 in the final.

== Seeds ==
1. (Uruguay) Ariel Behar / (Czech Republic) Adam Pavlásek (champions)
2. (Czech Republic) Roman Jebavý / (Venezuela) Luis David Martínez (first round)
3. (Ukraine) Vladyslav Manafov / (Poland) Szymon Walków (quarterfinals)
4. (Serbia) Ivan Sabanov / (Serbia) Matej Sabanov (semifinals)

== Draw ==
Key

- Q = Qualifier
- WC = Wild card
- LL = Lucky loser
- Alt = Alternate
- ITF = ITF entry
- PR = Protected ranking
- SR = Special ranking
- SE = Special exempt
- JE = Junior exempt
- JR = Junior Accelerator Programme entrant
- CO = College Accelerator Programme entrant
- NG = Next Gen Accelerator Program entrant
- w/o = Walkover
- r = Retired
- d = Defaulted

First round
1	(Uruguay) A Behar (Czech Republic) A Pavlásek	6	6
WC	(Slovakia) M Karol (Slovakia) L Pokorný	2	2
(Czech Republic) T Macháč (Czech Republic) D Svrčina	6	4	[7]
I Liutarevich; A Shevchenko	3	6	[10]
3	(Ukraine) V Manafov (Poland) S Walków	6	6
(Poland) P Matuszewski (Germany) K Wehnelt	1	0
(Poland) K Drzewiecki (Czech Republic) P Nouza	7^{7}	7^{7}
(Belgium) K Coppejans (India) S Nagal	6^{4}	6^{5}
Alt	(Brazil) D Dutra da Silva (Ukraine) V Sachko	5	6	[1]
(Australia) MC Romios (Australia) B Walkin	7	4	[10]
WC	(Slovakia) Peter Naď (Slovakia) Peter Benjamín Privara	2	2
4	(Serbia) I Sabanov (Serbia) M Sabanov	6	6
(Italy) R Bonadio (Italy) G Fonio	3	4
(Austria) N Oberleitner (Germany) T Sandkaulen	6	6
(Czech Republic) Z Kolář (Slovakia) I Zelenay	5	7	[10]
2	(Czech Republic) R Jebavý (Venezuela) LD Martínez	7	5	[6]

Quarterfinals
1	(Uruguay) A Behar (Czech Republic) A Pavlásek	6	6
I Liutarevich; A Shevchenko	2	4
3	(Ukraine) V Manafov (Poland) S Walków	4	2
(Poland) K Drzewiecki (Czech Republic) P Nouza	6	6
(Australia) MC Romios (Australia) B Walkin	3	2
4	(Serbia) I Sabanov (Serbia) M Sabanov	6	6
(Austria) N Oberleitner (Germany) T Sandkaulen	3	7	[10]
(Czech Republic) Z Kolář (Slovakia) I Zelenay	6	5	[6]

Semifinals
1	(Uruguay) A Behar (Czech Republic) A Pavlásek	3	6	[12]
(Poland) K Drzewiecki (Czech Republic) P Nouza	6	3	[10]
4	(Serbia) I Sabanov (Serbia) M Sabanov	6	4	[4]
(Austria) N Oberleitner (Germany) T Sandkaulen	3	6	[10]

Final
1	(Uruguay) A Behar (Czech Republic) A Pavlásek	6	6
(Austria) N Oberleitner (Germany) T Sandkaulen	4	4
