= 2026 Bratislava Open – Singles =

Singles
- 2026 Bratislava Open

Final
- Champion: (Japan) Taro Daniel
- Runner-up: (Kazakhstan) Alexander Shevchenko
- Score: 3–6, 6–0, 7–6^{(7–2)}

Events
| Singles | Doubles |
- Bratislava Open

Dino Prižmić was the defending champion but chose not to defend his title.

Taro Daniel won the title after defeating Alexander Shevchenko 3–6, 6–0, 7–6^{(7–2)} in the final.

== Seeds ==
1. (Kazakhstan) Alexander Shevchenko (final)
2. (United States) Emilio Nava (second round)
3. (United Kingdom) Jan Choinski (second round)
4. (Slovakia) Alex Molčan (withdrew)
5. (Chile) Tomás Barrios Vera (first round)
6. (Czech Republic) Zdeněk Kolář (quarterfinals)
7. (Hungary) Zsombor Piros (quarterfinals)
8. (Chinese Taipei) Tseng Chun-hsin (second round)

== Draw ==
Key

- Q = Qualifier
- WC = Wild card
- LL = Lucky loser
- Alt = Alternate
- ITF = ITF entry
- PR = Protected ranking
- SR = Special ranking
- SE = Special exempt
- JE = Junior exempt
- JR = Junior Accelerator Programme entrant
- CO = College Accelerator Programme entrant
- NG = Next Gen Accelerator Program entrant
- w/o = Walkover
- r = Retired
- d = Defaulted

=== Finals ===
Semifinals
1 | (Kazakhstan) Alexander Shevchenko | 6 | 6
(Ukraine) Vitaliy Sachko | 4 | 3
(Italy) Federico Cinà | 6^{6} | 6 | 2
Q | (Japan) Taro Daniel | 7^{8} | 0 | 6

Final
1 | (Kazakhstan) Alexander Shevchenko | 6 | 0 | 6^{2}
Q | (Japan) Taro Daniel | 3 | 6 | 7^{7}

=== Top half ===
First round
1 | (Kazakhstan) A Shevchenko | 6 | 3
(Romania) FC Jianu | 4 | 0^{r}
Q | (Czech Republic) H Bartoň | 4 | 7^{7} | 6
Q | (Belgium) B Gadamauri | 6 | 6^{2} | 1
Q | (Czech Republic) M Krumich | 6^{3} | 4
NG | (Czech Republic) M Mrva | 7^{7} | 6
LL | (Bulgaria) D Kuzmanov | 6^{8} | 1
8 | (Chinese Taipei) C-h Tseng | 7^{10} | 6
Q | (Jordan) A Shelbayh | 6^{2} | 2
NG | (Czech Republic) Petr Brunclík | 7^{7} | 6
(Portugal) T Pereira | 7 | 3 | 4
Q | (Slovakia) A Martin | 5 | 6 | 6
(Ukraine) V Sachko | 6 | 7^{7}
(Japan) Y Watanuki | 2 | 6^{4}
WC | (Australia) T Kokkinakis | 6 | 6
5 | (Chile) T Barrios Vera | 4 | 4

Second round
1 | (Kazakhstan) A Shevchenko | 4 | 6 | 7
Q | (Czech Republic) H Bartoň | 6 | 3 | 5
NG | (Czech Republic) M Mrva | 6 | 6
8 | (Chinese Taipei) C-h Tseng | 3 | 4
NG | (Czech Republic) P Brunclík | 6 | 7^{7}
Q | (Slovakia) A Martin | 4 | 6^{5}
(Ukraine) V Sachko | 5
WC | (Australia) T Kokkinakis | 2^{r}

Quarterfinals
1 | (Kazakhstan) A Shevchenko | 7^{11} | 6
NG | (Czech Republic) M Mrva | 6^{9} | 0
NG | (Czech Republic) P Brunclík | 6 | 3 | 2
(Ukraine) V Sachko | 3 | 6 | 6

Semifinals
1 | (Kazakhstan) A Shevchenko | 6 | 6
(Ukraine) V Sachko | 4 | 3

=== Bottom half ===
First round
6 | (Czech Republic) Z Kolář | 6 | 6
PR | (Chinese Taipei) J Jung | 3 | 1
WC | (Slovakia) L Pokorný | 6 | 6
(Argentina) A Barrena | 1 | 4
(Italy) F Cinà | 6 | 6
Alt | (Germany) M Topo | 3 | 2
WC | (Slovakia) N Gombos | 3 | 4
3 | (United Kingdom) J Choinski | 6 | 6
7 | (Hungary) Z Piros | 7^{7} | 7
LL | (Japan) A Santillan | 6^{5} | 5
(Brazil) JL Reis da Silva | 6 | 6
SE | (Bulgaria) A Donski | 2 | 4
Q | (Japan) T Daniel | 6 | 6
(Kazakhstan) T Skatov | 3 | 3
(Brazil) P Boscardin Dias | 5 | 6 | 1
2 | (United States) E Nava | 7 | 3 | 6

Second round
6 | (Czech Republic) Z Kolář | 6 | 6
WC | (Slovakia) L Pokorný | 4 | 4
(Italy) F Cinà | 6 | 7
3 | (United Kingdom) J Choinski | 1 | 5
7 | (Hungary) Z Piros | 6 | 6
(Brazil) JL Reis da Silva | 2 | 4
Q | (Japan) T Daniel | 6 | 6
2 | (United States) E Nava | 1 | 3

Quarterfinals
6 | (Czech Republic) Z Kolář | 6 | 4 | 3
(Italy) F Cinà | 4 | 6 | 6
7 | (Hungary) Z Piros | 3 | 3
Q | (Japan) T Daniel | 6 | 6

Semifinals
(Italy) F Cinà | 6^{6} | 6 | 2
Q | (Japan) T Daniel | 7^{8} | 0 | 6
