= 2024 Bratislava Open – Doubles =

Doubles
- 2024 Bratislava Open

Final
- Champions: (Germany) Jakob Schnaitter (Germany) Mark Wallner
- Runners-up: (Slovakia) Miloš Karol (Slovakia) Tomáš Lánik
- Score: 6–4, 6–4

Events
Singles	Doubles
- Bratislava Open

Ariel Behar and Adam Pavlásek were the defending champions but chose not to defend their title.

Jakob Schnaitter and Mark Wallner won the title after defeating Miloš Karol and Tomáš Lánik 6–4, 6–4 in the final.

== Seeds ==
1. (Ukraine) Denys Molchanov / (Austria) Philipp Oswald (semifinals)
2. (South Korea) Nam Ji-sung / (Finland) Patrik Niklas-Salminen (semifinals)
3. (Czech Republic) Petr Nouza / (Czech Republic) Patrik Rikl (quarterfinals)
4. Ivan Liutarevich / (Spain) Sergio Martos Gornés (quarterfinals)

== Draw ==
Key

- Q = Qualifier
- WC = Wild card
- LL = Lucky loser
- Alt = Alternate
- ITF = ITF entry
- PR = Protected ranking
- SR = Special ranking
- SE = Special exempt
- JE = Junior exempt
- JR = Junior Accelerator Programme entrant
- CO = College Accelerator Programme entrant
- NG = Next Gen Accelerator Program entrant
- w/o = Walkover
- r = Retired
- d = Defaulted

=== Draw ===
First round
1	(Ukraine) D Molchanov (Austria) P Oswald	7^{7}	7^{10}
(Kazakhstan) D Popko (Ukraine) V Sachko	6^{1}	6^{8}
(Turkey) E Kırkın (Ukraine) I Marchenko	6^{4}	2
(Poland) K Drzewiecki (Poland) P Matuszewski	7^{7}	6
3	(Czech Republic) P Nouza (Czech Republic) P Rikl	6	6
(Czech Republic) R Jebavý (Czech Republic) D Svrčina	4	3
WC	(Slovakia) M Karol (Slovakia) Tomáš Lánik	7	6
(Spain) Í Cervantes (Spain) O Roca Batalla	5	2
(Sweden) S Freund (Denmark) J Ingildsen	6	4	[6]
(Germany) J Schnaitter (Germany) M Wallner	4	6	[10]
(Argentina) P Cachín (Argentina) GA Olivieri	6	3	[7]
4	I Liutarevich (Spain) S Martos Gornés	3	6	[10]
WC	(Slovakia) L Pokorný (Slovakia) I Zelenay	6	5	[7]
(Serbia) I Sabanov (Serbia) M Sabanov	4	7	[10]
(Brazil) M Alves (Israel) D Cukierman	6^{5}	6	[7]
2	(South Korea) J-s Nam (Finland) P Niklas-Salminen	7^{7}	4	[10]

Quarterfinals
1	(Ukraine) D Molchanov (Austria) P Oswald	3	7^{7}	[10]
(Poland) K Drzewiecki (Poland) P Matuszewski	6	6^{5}	[7]
3	(Czech Republic) P Nouza (Czech Republic) P Rikl	3	4
WC	(Slovakia) M Karol (Slovakia) T Lánik	6	6
(Germany) J Schnaitter (Germany) M Wallner	6	3	[11]
4	I Liutarevich (Spain) S Martos Gornés	1	6	[9]
(Serbia) I Sabanov (Serbia) M Sabanov	4	4
2	(South Korea) J-s Nam (Finland) P Niklas-Salminen	6	6

Semifinals
1	(Ukraine) D Molchanov (Austria) P Oswald	2	3
WC	(Slovakia) M Karol (Slovakia) T Lánik	6	6
(Germany) J Schnaitter (Germany) M Wallner	5	6	[10]
2	(South Korea) J-s Nam (Finland) P Niklas-Salminen	7	3	[1]

Final
WC	(Slovakia) M Karol (Slovakia) T Lánik	4	4
(Germany) J Schnaitter (Germany) M Wallner	6	6
