= 2025 Bratislava Open – Doubles =

Doubles
- 2025 Bratislava Open

Final
- Champions: (Czech Republic) Andrew Paulson (Czech Republic) Matěj Vocel
- Runners-up: (Czech Republic) Jiří Barnat (Czech Republic) Filip Duda
- Score: 6–1, 6–4

Events
Singles	Doubles
- Bratislava Open

Jakob Schnaitter and Mark Wallner were the defending champions but chose not to defend their title.

Andrew Paulson and Matěj Vocel won the title after defeating Jiří Barnat and Filip Duda 6–1, 6–4 in the final.

== Seeds ==
1. (Romania) Victor Vlad Cornea / (Poland) Karol Drzewiecki (first round)
2. (Israel) Daniel Cukierman / (Poland) Piotr Matuszewski (quarterfinals)
3. (Peru) Alexander Merino / (Germany) Christoph Negritu (first round)
4. (Serbia) Ivan Sabanov / (Poland) Szymon Walków (first round)

== Draw ==
Key

- Q = Qualifier
- WC = Wild card
- LL = Lucky loser
- Alt = Alternate
- ITF = ITF entry
- PR = Protected ranking
- SR = Special ranking
- SE = Special exempt
- JE = Junior exempt
- JR = Junior Accelerator Programme entrant
- CO = College Accelerator Programme entrant
- NG = Next Gen Accelerator Program entrant
- w/o = Walkover
- r = Retired
- d = Defaulted

=== Draw ===
First round
1	(Romania) V Cornea (Poland) K Drzewiecki	2	7^{10}	[9]
(Czech Republic) H Bartoň (Ukraine) D Molchanov	6	6^{8}	[11]
(Czech Republic) A Paulson (Czech Republic) M Vocel	3	6	[10]
(Venezuela) LD Martínez (Argentina) F Mena	6	4	[7]
4	(Serbia) I Sabanov (Poland) S Walków	1	4
(Brazil) M Alves (Slovakia) L Pokorný	6	6
WC	(Slovakia) A Martin (Austria) M Neuchrist	6	4	[10]
(Slovakia) M Karol (Slovakia) Tomáš Lánik	4	6	[5]
WC	(Slovakia) Michal Krajčí (Slovakia) Radovan Michalik	6	3	[5]
(Czech Republic) J Jermář (Serbia) S Latinović	4	6	[10]
(Bulgaria) A Donski (Spain) B Pujol Navarro	6	6
3	(Peru) A Merino (Germany) C Negritu	2	1
(Austria) D Pichler (Austria) J Rodionov	2	4
(Czech Republic) Jiří Barnat (Czech Republic) F Duda	6	6
I Liutarevich (Ukraine) O Prihodko	4	4
2	(Israel) D Cukierman (Poland) P Matuszewski	6	6

Quarterfinals
(Czech Republic) H Bartoň (Ukraine) D Molchanov	3	2
(Czech Republic) A Paulson (Czech Republic) M Vocel	6	6
(Brazil) M Alves (Slovakia) L Pokorný	6	6
WC	(Slovakia) A Martin (Austria) M Neuchrist	3	4
(Czech Republic) J Jermář (Serbia) S Latinović	6	6
(Bulgaria) A Donski (Spain) B Pujol Navarro	3	2
(Czech Republic) J Barnat (Czech Republic) F Duda	7	6
2	(Israel) D Cukierman (Poland) P Matuszewski	5	3

Semifinals
(Czech Republic) A Paulson (Czech Republic) M Vocel	6	6
(Brazil) M Alves (Slovakia) L Pokorný	2	4
(Czech Republic) J Jermář (Serbia) S Latinović	3	5
(Czech Republic) J Barnat (Czech Republic) F Duda	6	7

Final
(Czech Republic) A Paulson (Czech Republic) M Vocel	6	6
(Czech Republic) J Barnat (Czech Republic) F Duda	1	4
