= 2025 Bratislava Open – Singles =

Singles
- 2025 Bratislava Open

Final
- Champion: (Croatia) Dino Prižmić
- Runner-up: (France) Valentin Royer
- Score: 6–4, 7–6^{(8–6)}

Events
Singles	Doubles
- Bratislava Open

Kamil Majchrzak was the defending champion but chose not to defend his title.

Dino Prižmić won the title after defeating Valentin Royer 6–4, 7–6^{(8–6)} in the final.

== Seeds ==
1. (Kazakhstan) Alexander Shevchenko (semifinals)
2. (Chile) Tomás Barrios Vera (second round)
3. (Portugal) Jaime Faria (first round, retired)
4. (France) Valentin Royer (final)
5. (Chile) Cristian Garín (semifinals)
6. (United States) Emilio Nava (second round)
7. (Hungary) Zsombor Piros (withdrew)
8. (Slovakia) Lukáš Klein (first round)

== Draw ==
Key

- Q = Qualifier
- WC = Wild card
- LL = Lucky loser
- Alt = Alternate
- ITF = ITF entry
- PR = Protected ranking
- SR = Special ranking
- SE = Special exempt
- JE = Junior exempt
- JR = Junior Accelerator Programme entrant
- CO = College Accelerator Programme entrant
- NG = Next Gen Accelerator Program entrant
- w/o = Walkover
- r = Retired
- d = Defaulted

=== Finals ===
Semifinals
1	(Kazakhstan) Alexander Shevchenko	5	6	2
4	(France) Valentin Royer	7	4	6
5	(Chile) Cristian Garín	3	2
(Croatia) Dino Prižmić	6	6

Final
4	(France) Valentin Royer	4	6^{6}
(Croatia) Dino Prižmić	6	7^{8}

=== Top half ===
First round
1	(Kazakhstan) A Shevchenko	6	6
(Germany) C Negritu	4	1
(United Kingdom) J Choinski	6	6
(Slovakia) J Kovalík	3	4
Q	(Czech Republic) H Bartoň	6^{5}	3
NG	(Italy) F Cinà	7^{7}	6
Alt	(Slovakia) A Martin	1	1
6	(United States) E Nava	6	6
4	(France) V Royer	4	6	6
LL	(Ukraine) O Prihodko	6	2	1
(Monaco) V Vacherot	6	3	6
WC	(Slovakia) A Molčan	3	6	3
(Czech Republic) M Gengel	2	2
(Argentina) F Mena	6	6
Q	(Germany) M Topo	7^{7}	3	7^{9}
Q	(Slovakia) N Gombos	6^{2}	6	6^{7}

Second round
1	(Kazakhstan) A Shevchenko	6	6
(United Kingdom) J Choinski	3	2
NG	(Italy) F Cinà	7^{7}	6
6	(United States) E Nava	6^{3}	3
4	(France) V Royer	1	6	6
(Monaco) V Vacherot	6	3	4
(Argentina) F Mena	3	4
Q	(Germany) M Topo	6	6

Quarterfinals
1	(Kazakhstan) A Shevchenko	7^{7}	6
NG	(Italy) F Cinà	6^{4}	4
4	(France) V Royer	5	6	6
Q	(Germany) M Topo	7	3	3

Semifinals
1	(Kazakhstan) A Shevchenko	5	6	2
4	(France) V Royer	7	4	6

=== Bottom half ===
First round
5	(Chile) C Garín	6	7^{7}
(Jordan) A Shelbayh	1	6^{3}
(Croatia) L Mikrut	2	7^{7}	1
(Romania) FC Jianu	6	6^{3}	6
WC	(Slovakia) L Pokorný	3	6	6^{2}
Q	(United States) T Kodat	6	4	7^{7}
Q	(Croatia) M Dodig	7	2
3	(Portugal) J Faria	5	0^{r}
8	(Slovakia) L Klein	2	4
WC	(Slovakia) M Karol	6	6
(Croatia) D Prižmić	6	6
(Austria) J Rodionov	1	4
Q	(Poland) D Michalski	2	1
(Portugal) H Rocha	6	6
A Vatutin	3	2
2	(Chile) T Barrios Vera	6	6

Second round
5	(Chile) C Garín	7^{7}	6
(Romania) FC Jianu	6^{3}	1
Q	(United States) T Kodat	6^{2}	3
Q	(Croatia) M Dodig	7^{7}	6
WC	(Slovakia) M Karol	3	2
(Croatia) D Prižmić	6	6
(Portugal) H Rocha	6	7
2	(Chile) T Barrios Vera	2	5

Quarterfinals
5	(Chile) C Garín	6	6
Q	(Croatia) M Dodig	4	3
(Croatia) D Prižmić	6	6
(Portugal) H Rocha	4	1

Semifinals
5	(Chile) C Garín	3	2
(Croatia) D Prižmić	6	6
