= 2022 Bratislava Open – Singles =

Singles
- 2022 Bratislava Open

Final
- Champion: Alexander Shevchenko
- Runner-up: (Italy) Riccardo Bonadio
- Score: 6–3, 7–5

Events
Singles	Doubles
← 2021 ·	Bratislava Open	· 2023 →

Tallon Griekspoor was the defending champion but chose not to defend his title.

Alexander Shevchenko won the title after defeating Riccardo Bonadio 6–3, 7–5 in the final.

== Seeds ==
1. (Switzerland) Henri Laaksonen (withdrew)
2. (Chinese Taipei) Tseng Chun-hsin (semifinals)
3. (Slovakia) Norbert Gombos (semifinals)
4. (Slovakia) Andrej Martin (first round)
5. (Czech Republic) Zdeněk Kolář (first round)
6. (Austria) Dennis Novak (second round)
7. (Czech Republic) Vít Kopřiva (quarterfinals)
8. (Kazakhstan) Dmitry Popko (second round)

== Draw ==
=== Key ===
- Q = Qualifier
- WC = Wild card
- LL = Lucky loser
- Alt = Alternate
- SE = Special exempt
- PR = Protected ranking
- ITF = ITF entry
- JE = Junior exempt
- w/o = Walkover
- r = Retired
- d = Defaulted
- SR = Special ranking

=== Finals ===
Semifinals
Alexander Shevchenko	7^{7}	7^{7}
3	(Slovakia) Norbert Gombos	6^{5}	6^{4}
(Italy) Riccardo Bonadio	1	6	6
2	(Chinese Taipei) Tseng Chun-hsin	6	1	4

Final
Alexander Shevchenko	6	7
(Italy) Riccardo Bonadio	3	5

=== Top half ===
First round
LL	(Germany) L Wessels	6^{0}	6	7^{7}
(Brazil) M Pucinelli de Almeida	7^{7}	4	6^{5}
A Kuznetsov	7^{7}	7^{7}
WC	(Slovakia) M Karol	6^{3}	6^{3}
(Slovakia) F Horanský	2	4
A Shevchenko	6	6
(United States) N Moreno de Alboran	1	3
6	(Austria) D Novak	6	6
3	(Slovakia) N Gombos	6	3	6
WC	(Slovakia) Peter Benjamín Privara	1	6	4
(Bosnia and Herzegovina) M Bašić	3	3
Q	E Karlovskiy	6	6
(Slovakia) J Kovalík	6^{5}	6	6
E Donskoy	7^{7}	2	2
Q	(Ukraine) O Prihodko	6	1	2
8	(Kazakhstan) D Popko	4	6	6

Second round
LL	(Germany) L Wessels	1	4
A Kuznetsov	6	6
A Shevchenko	6	6
6	(Austria) D Novak	3	2
3	(Slovakia) N Gombos	6	7
Q	E Karlovskiy	0	5
(Slovakia) J Kovalík	6^{3}	6	6
8	(Kazakhstan) D Popko	7^{7}	0	1

Quarterfinals
A Kuznetsov	4	2
A Shevchenko	6	6
3	(Slovakia) N Gombos	6	7^{7}
(Slovakia) J Kovalík	3	6^{4}

Semifinals
A Shevchenko	7^{7}	7^{7}
3	(Slovakia) N Gombos	6^{5}	6^{4}

=== Bottom half ===
First round
5	(Czech Republic) Z Kolář	2	2
(Italy) R Bonadio	6	6
WC	(Slovakia) L Klein	4	4
Q	(Hungary) F Marozsán	6	6
Q	(Spain) A Moro Cañas	6	2	5
Q	(Ukraine) O Krutykh	2	6	7
(Czech Republic) D Svrčina	6	6
4	(Slovakia) A Martin	3	4
7	(Czech Republic) V Kopřiva	7^{9}	7^{7}
Alt	(Brazil) D Dutra da Silva	6^{7}	6^{4}
(Ukraine) V Sachko	6	3	4
Q	(Switzerland) J Nikles	3	6	6
(Ukraine) I Marchenko	7^{7}	2	6^{2}
LL	(Romania) FC Jianu	6^{4}	6	7^{7}
(Czech Republic) L Rosol	4	4
2	(Chinese Taipei) C-h Tseng	6	6

Second round
(Italy) R Bonadio	7	5	6
Q	(Hungary) F Marozsán	5	7	2
Q	(Ukraine) O Krutykh	6	6
(Czech Republic) D Svrčina	4	4
7	(Czech Republic) V Kopřiva	6	6
Q	(Switzerland) J Nikles	1	4
LL	(Romania) FC Jianu	3^{r}
2	(Chinese Taipei) C-h Tseng	5

Quarterfinals
(Italy) R Bonadio	6	1	7
Q	(Ukraine) O Krutykh	4	6	5
7	(Czech Republic) V Kopřiva	5	7	5
2	(Chinese Taipei) C-h Tseng	7	5	7

Semifinals
(Italy) R Bonadio	1	6	6
2	(Chinese Taipei) C-h Tseng	6	1	4
