= 2022 Bratislava Open – Doubles =

Doubles
- 2022 Bratislava Open

Final
- Champions: (India) Sriram Balaji (India) Jeevan Nedunchezhiyan
- Runners-up: (Ukraine) Vladyslav Manafov (Ukraine) Oleg Prihodko
- Score: 7–6^{(8–6)}, 6–4

Events
Singles	Doubles
- Bratislava Open

Denys Molchanov and Aleksandr Nedovyesov were the defending champions but chose not to defend their title.

Sriram Balaji and Jeevan Nedunchezhiyan won the title after defeating Vladyslav Manafov and Oleg Prihodko 7–6^{(8–6)}, 6–4 in the final.

== Seeds ==
1. (Austria) Alexander Erler / (Austria) Lucas Miedler (semifinals)
2. (Slovakia) Andrej Martin / (Austria) Tristan-Samuel Weissborn (first round)
3. (Switzerland) Luca Margaroli / (Ukraine) Vitaliy Sachko (first round)
4. (India) Sriram Balaji / (India) Jeevan Nedunchezhiyan (champions)

== Draw ==
Key

- Q = Qualifier
- WC = Wild card
- LL = Lucky loser
- Alt = Alternate
- ITF = ITF entry
- PR = Protected ranking
- SR = Special ranking
- SE = Special exempt
- JE = Junior exempt
- JR = Junior Accelerator Programme entrant
- CO = College Accelerator Programme entrant
- NG = Next Gen Accelerator Program entrant
- w/o = Walkover
- r = Retired
- d = Defaulted

First round
1	(Austria) A Erler (Austria) L Miedler	6	3	[10]
E Karlovskiy (India) S Myneni	3	6	[4]
(Ukraine) O Krutykh (Switzerland) J Nikles	6	3	[7]
(Czech Republic) V Kopřiva (Czech Republic) J Pospíšil	1	6	[10]
4	(India) S Balaji (India) J Nedunchezhiyan	6	7^{9}
(Brazil) D Dutra da Silva (Zimbabwe) CJ Lock	3	6^{7}
E Donskoy; A Kuznetsov	3	4
WC	(Slovakia) Peter Naď (Slovakia) Peter Benjamín Privara	6	6
PR	(Czech Republic) P Nouza (Australia) L Tu	6	6
(Romania) VV Cornea (Romania) ND Ionel	4	4
(Czech Republic) A Pavlásek (Slovakia) I Zelenay	6	6
3	(Switzerland) L Margaroli (Ukraine) V Sachko	2	3
(Uzbekistan) S Fayziev (Greece) M Kalovelonis	6	3	[10]
WC	(Slovakia) M Karol (Slovakia) L Pokorný	2	6	[8]
(Ukraine) V Manafov (Ukraine) O Prihodko	7^{7}	7^{7}
2	(Slovakia) A Martin (Austria) T-S Weissborn	6^{5}	6^{5}

Quarterfinals
1	(Austria) A Erler (Austria) L Miedler	6	6
(Czech Republic) V Kopřiva (Czech Republic) J Pospíšil	2	4
4	(India) S Balaji (India) J Nedunchezhiyan	7^{7}	6
WC	(Slovakia) P Naď (Slovakia) PB Privara	6^{2}	1
PR	(Czech Republic) P Nouza (Australia) L Tu	6	6^{2}	[9]
(Czech Republic) A Pavlásek (Slovakia) I Zelenay	3	7^{7}	[11]
(Uzbekistan) S Fayziev (Greece) M Kalovelonis	3	2
(Ukraine) V Manafov (Ukraine) O Prihodko	6	6

Semifinals
1	(Austria) A Erler (Austria) L Miedler	7	5	[4]
4	(India) S Balaji (India) J Nedunchezhiyan	5	7	[10]
(Czech Republic) A Pavlásek (Slovakia) I Zelenay	6	3	[8]
(Ukraine) V Manafov (Ukraine) O Prihodko	2	6	[10]

Final
4	(India) S Balaji (India) J Nedunchezhiyan	7^{8}	6
(Ukraine) V Manafov (Ukraine) O Prihodko	6^{6}	4
