= 2023 Bratislava Open – Singles =

Singles
- 2023 Bratislava Open

Final
- Champion: (Ukraine) Vitaliy Sachko
- Runner-up: (Bulgaria) Dimitar Kuzmanov
- Score: 2–6, 6–2, 7–6^{(7–2)}

Events
Singles	Doubles
- Bratislava Open

Alexander Shevchenko was the defending champion but lost in the first round to Jakub Menšík.

Vitaliy Sachko won the title after defeating Dimitar Kuzmanov 2–6, 6–2, 7–6^{(7–2)} in the final.

== Seeds ==
1. (Slovakia) Alex Molčan (semifinals)
2. Alexander Shevchenko (first round)
3. (Argentina) Federico Coria (quarterfinals)
4. (Hungary) Zsombor Piros (second round)
5. (Czech Republic) Tomáš Macháč (quarterfinals)
6. (Slovakia) Norbert Gombos (second round)
7. (Slovakia) Lukáš Klein (first round)
8. (Slovakia) Jozef Kovalík (first round)

== Draw ==
Key

- Q = Qualifier
- WC = Wild card
- LL = Lucky loser
- Alt = Alternate
- ITF = ITF entry
- PR = Protected ranking
- SR = Special ranking
- SE = Special exempt
- JE = Junior exempt
- JR = Junior Accelerator Programme entrant
- CO = College Accelerator Programme entrant
- NG = Next Gen Accelerator Program entrant
- w/o = Walkover
- r = Retired
- d = Defaulted

=== Finals ===
Semifinals
1	(Slovakia) Alex Molčan	0	1
(Bulgaria) Dimitar Kuzmanov	6	6
Q	(Ukraine) Vitaliy Sachko	6	7
(Chile) Tomás Barrios Vera	4	5

Final
(Bulgaria) Dimitar Kuzmanov	6	2	6^{2}
Q	(Ukraine) Vitaliy Sachko	2	6	7^{7}

=== Top half ===
First round
1	(Slovakia) A Molčan	4	6	6
(Argentina) RA Burruchaga	6	2	3
WC	(Slovakia) Peter Benjamín Privara	6	6^{4}	1
(Belgium) K Coppejans	1	7^{7}	6
Alt	(Poland) K Żuk	6	5	2
(Czech Republic) Z Kolář	4	7	6
(Italy) R Bonadio	4	7^{8}	2
5	(Czech Republic) T Macháč	6	6^{6}	6
4	(Hungary) Z Piros	6	7
(India) S Nagal	2	5
Q	(Austria) G Melzer	2	3
(Bulgaria) D Kuzmanov	6	6
Q	(Switzerland) J Kym	6	7^{7}
(Switzerland) H Laaksonen	2	6^{3}
(Czech Republic) D Svrčina	3	6	4
6	(Slovakia) N Gombos	6	3	6

Second round
1	(Slovakia) A Molčan	6	7
(Belgium) K Coppejans	4	5
(Czech Republic) Z Kolář	4	0
5	(Czech Republic) T Macháč	6	6
4	(Hungary) Z Piros	3	6	4
(Bulgaria) D Kuzmanov	6	2	6
Q	(Switzerland) J Kym	6	6^{6}	7^{9}
6	(Slovakia) N Gombos	3	7^{8}	6^{7}

Quarterfinals
1	(Slovakia) A Molčan	7^{7}	3	6
5	(Czech Republic) T Macháč	6^{5}	6	1
(Bulgaria) D Kuzmanov	7	6
Q	(Switzerland) J Kym	5	4

Semifinals
1	(Slovakia) A Molčan	0	1
(Bulgaria) D Kuzmanov	6	6

=== Bottom half ===
First round
8	(Slovakia) J Kovalík	6^{1}	7	0
Q	(Ukraine) V Sachko	7^{7}	5	6
(Croatia) D Prižmić	2	4
Q	(Ukraine) I Marchenko	6	6
Q	(Egypt) M Safwat	2	7^{8}	6
WC	(Slovakia) L Pokorný	6	6^{6}	4
(Poland) D Michalski	0	2
3	(Argentina) F Coria	6	6
7	(Slovakia) L Klein	6	5	0
(Chile) T Barrios Vera	1	7	6
(Bosnia and Herzegovina) D Džumhur	7^{8}	1	4
Q	(Austria) L Neumayer	6^{6}	6	6
WC	(Spain) F Verdasco	7	6
(Turkey) C İlkel	5	4
(Czech Republic) J Menšík	6	3	6
2	A Shevchenko	4	6	1

Second round
Q	(Ukraine) V Sachko	7	6
Q	(Ukraine) I Marchenko	5	1
Q	(Egypt) M Safwat	7^{7}	2	4
3	(Argentina) F Coria	6^{3}	6	6
(Chile) T Barrios Vera	5	6	6
Q	(Austria) L Neumayer	7	3	3
WC	(Spain) F Verdasco	1	4
(Czech Republic) J Menšík	6	6

Quarterfinals
Q	(Ukraine) V Sachko	4	7	6
3	(Argentina) F Coria	6	5	3
(Chile) T Barrios Vera	4	6	6
(Czech Republic) J Menšík	6	1	3

Semifinals
Q	(Ukraine) V Sachko	6	7
(Chile) T Barrios Vera	4	5
