= 2023 Bratislava Open =

Slovak tennis tournament

- Date: 12–18 June
- Edition: 4th
- Category: ATP Challenger Tour
- Surface: Clay
- Location: Bratislava, Slovakia

Champions

Singles
- (Ukraine) Vitaliy Sachko

Doubles
- (Uruguay) Ariel Behar / (Czech Republic) Adam Pavlásek
- Bratislava Open

The 2023 Bratislava Open was a professional tennis tournament played on clay courts. It was the 4th edition of the tournament which was part of the 2023 ATP Challenger Tour. It took place in Bratislava, Slovakia between 12 and 18 June 2023.

== Singles main-draw entrants ==
=== Seeds ===
Country	Player	Rank^{1}	Seed
SVK	Alex Molčan	86	1
	Alexander Shevchenko	87	2
ARG	Federico Coria	96	3
HUN	Zsombor Piros	125	4
CZE	Tomáš Macháč	127	5
SVK	Norbert Gombos	132	6
SVK	Lukáš Klein	133	7
SVK	Jozef Kovalík	143	8

- ^{1} Rankings are as of 29 May 2023.

=== Other entrants ===
The following players received wildcards into the singles main draw:

- (Slovakia) Lukáš Pokorný
- (Slovakia) Peter Benjamín Privara
- (Spain) Fernando Verdasco

The following player received entry into the singles main draw as an alternate:

- (Poland) Kacper Żuk

The following players received entry from the qualifying draw:

- (Switzerland) Jérôme Kym
- (Ukraine) Illya Marchenko
- (Austria) Gerald Melzer
- (Austria) Lukas Neumayer
- (Ukraine) Vitaliy Sachko
- (Egypt) Mohamed Safwat

== Champions ==
=== Singles ===
- (Ukraine) Vitaliy Sachko def. (Bulgaria) Dimitar Kuzmanov 2–6, 6–2, 7–6^{(7–2)}.

=== Doubles ===
- (Uruguay) Ariel Behar / (Czech Republic) Adam Pavlásek def. (Austria) Neil Oberleitner / (Germany) Tim Sandkaulen 6–4, 6–4.
