= 2021 Bratislava Open – Doubles =

Doubles
- 2021 Bratislava Open

Final
- Champions: (Ukraine) Denys Molchanov (Kazakhstan) Aleksandr Nedovyesov
- Runners-up: (Netherlands) Sander Arends (Venezuela) Luis David Martínez
- Score: 7–6^{(7–5)}, 6–1

Events
Singles	Doubles
- Bratislava Open

Sander Gillé and Joran Vliegen were the defending champions but chose not to defend their title.

Denys Molchanov and Aleksandr Nedovyesov won the title after defeating Sander Arends and Luis David Martínez 7–6^{(7–5)}, 6–1 in the final.

== Seeds ==
1. (Ukraine) Denys Molchanov / (Kazakhstan) Aleksandr Nedovyesov (champions)
2. (Netherlands) Sander Arends / (Venezuela) Luis David Martínez (final)
3. (Brazil) Orlando Luz / (Brazil) Rafael Matos (semifinals)
4. (Czech Republic) Roman Jebavý / (Czech Republic) Zdeněk Kolář (first round)

== Draw ==
Key

- Q = Qualifier
- WC = Wild card
- LL = Lucky loser
- Alt = Alternate
- ITF = ITF entry
- PR = Protected ranking
- SR = Special ranking
- SE = Special exempt
- JE = Junior exempt
- JR = Junior Accelerator Programme entrant
- CO = College Accelerator Programme entrant
- NG = Next Gen Accelerator Program entrant
- w/o = Walkover
- r = Retired
- d = Defaulted

First round
1	(Ukraine) D Molchanov (Kazakhstan) A Nedovyesov	6	7
(Argentina) F Coria (Argentina) R Olivo	3	5
(Germany) M Bachinger (Germany) T Kamke	3	7^{7}	[3]
(India) S Balaji (Switzerland) L Margaroli	6	6^{5}	[10]
3	(Brazil) O Luz (Brazil) R Matos	6	7^{7}
(Austria) L Miedler (Germany) M Moraing	1	6^{5}
WC	(Slovakia) Lukáš Palovič (Slovakia) L Pokorný	2	5
(Croatia) I Sabanov (Croatia) M Sabanov	6	7
(Tunisia) M Jaziri (Slovenia) B Rola	6	7
(United States) M Schnur (Netherlands) S Verbeek	3	5
(Slovakia) L Klein (Slovakia) A Molčan	7^{7}	6
4	(Czech Republic) R Jebavý (Czech Republic) Z Kolář	6^{4}	4
(Turkey) C İlkel (Czech Republic) V Kopřiva	6^{2}	2
WC	(Slovakia) F Horanský (Slovakia) M Karol	7^{7}	6
WC	(Slovakia) M Mečíř (Slovakia) Michal Novanský	2	1
2	(Netherlands) S Arends (Venezuela) LD Martínez	6	6

Quarterfinals
1	(Ukraine) D Molchanov (Kazakhstan) A Nedovyesov	2	7	[10]
(India) S Balaji (Switzerland) L Margaroli	6	5	[8]
3	(Brazil) O Luz (Brazil) R Matos	6	6
(Croatia) I Sabanov (Croatia) M Sabanov	2	3
(Tunisia) M Jaziri (Slovenia) B Rola	6	4	[10]
(Slovakia) L Klein (Slovakia) A Molčan	1	6	[7]
WC	(Slovakia) F Horanský (Slovakia) M Karol	2	6^{6}
2	(Netherlands) S Arends (Venezuela) LD Martínez	6	7^{8}

Semifinals
1	(Ukraine) D Molchanov (Kazakhstan) A Nedovyesov	6	6
3	(Brazil) O Luz (Brazil) R Matos	4	4
(Tunisia) M Jaziri (Slovenia) B Rola	4	1
2	(Netherlands) S Arends (Venezuela) LD Martínez	6	6

Final
1	(Ukraine) D Molchanov (Kazakhstan) A Nedovyesov	7^{7}	6
2	(Netherlands) S Arends (Venezuela) LD Martínez	6^{5}	1
