= 2025 Bratislava Open =

Slovak tennis tournament

- Date: 9–15 June
- Edition: 6th
- Category: ATP Challenger Tour
- Surface: Clay
- Location: Bratislava, Slovakia

Champions

Singles
- (Croatia) Dino Prižmić

Doubles
- (Czech Republic) Andrew Paulson / (Czech Republic) Matěj Vocel
- Bratislava Open

The 2025 Bratislava Open was a professional tennis tournament played on clay courts. It was the sixth edition of the tournament which was part of the 2025 ATP Challenger Tour. It took place in Bratislava, Slovakia between 9 and 15 June 2025.

== Singles main-draw entrants ==
=== Seeds ===
Country	Player	Rank^{1}	Seed
KAZ	Alexander Shevchenko	103	1
CHI	Tomás Barrios Vera	110	2
POR	Jaime Faria	115	3
FRA	Valentin Royer	120	4
CHI	Cristian Garín	123	5
USA	Emilio Nava	137	6
~~HUN~~	~~Zsombor Piros~~	~~160~~	~~7~~
SVK	Lukáš Klein	190	8

- ^{1} Rankings are as of 26 May 2025.

=== Other entrants ===
The following players received wildcards into the singles main draw:

- (Slovakia) Miloš Karol
- (Slovakia) Alex Molčan
- (Slovakia) Lukáš Pokorný

The following player received entry into the singles main draw through the Next Gen Accelerator programme:

- (Italy) Federico Cinà

The following player received entry into the singles main draw as an alternate:

- (Slovakia) Andrej Martin

The following players received entry from the qualifying draw:

- (Czech Republic) Hynek Bartoň
- (Croatia) Matej Dodig
- (Slovakia) Norbert Gombos
- (United States) Toby Kodat
- (Poland) Daniel Michalski
- (Germany) Marko Topo

The following player received entry as a lucky loser:

- (Ukraine) Oleg Prihodko

== Champions ==
=== Singles ===
- (Croatia) Dino Prižmić def. (France) Valentin Royer 6–4, 7–6^{(8–6)}.

=== Doubles ===
- (Czech Republic) Andrew Paulson / (Czech Republic) Matěj Vocel def. (Czech Republic) Jiří Barnat / (Czech Republic) Filip Duda 6–1, 6–4.
