= 2024 Bratislava Open – Singles =

Singles
- 2024 Bratislava Open

Final
- Champion: (Poland) Kamil Majchrzak
- Runner-up: (Portugal) Henrique Rocha
- Score: 6–0, 2–6, 6–3

Events
Singles	Doubles
- Bratislava Open

Vitaliy Sachko was the defending champion but lost in the first round to Martin Krumich.

Kamil Majchrzak won the title after defeating Henrique Rocha 6–0, 2–6, 6–3 in the final.

== Seeds ==
1. (Argentina) Pedro Cachín (quarterfinals)
2. (Spain) Albert Ramos Viñolas (second round)
3. (Moldova) Radu Albot (first round)
4. (Slovakia) Jozef Kovalík (semifinals)
5. (Hungary) Zsombor Piros (first round)
6. (Spain) Oriol Roca Batalla (first round)
7. (Argentina) Marco Trungelliti (second round)
8. (Portugal) Jaime Faria (first round)

== Draw ==
Key

- Q = Qualifier
- WC = Wild card
- LL = Lucky loser
- Alt = Alternate
- ITF = ITF entry
- PR = Protected ranking
- SR = Special ranking
- SE = Special exempt
- JE = Junior exempt
- JR = Junior Accelerator Programme entrant
- CO = College Accelerator Programme entrant
- NG = Next Gen Accelerator Program entrant
- w/o = Walkover
- r = Retired
- d = Defaulted

=== Finals ===
Semifinals
Q	(Switzerland) Jérôme Kym	4	7	3
Q	(Poland) Kamil Majchrzak	6	5	6
4/WC	(Slovakia) Jozef Kovalík	3	4
(Portugal) Henrique Rocha	6	6

Final
Q	(Poland) Kamil Majchrzak	6	2	6
(Portugal) Henrique Rocha	0	6	3

=== Top half ===
First round
1	(Argentina) P Cachín	6	6^{3}	7
(Czech Republic) J Veselý	3	7^{7}	5
(Ukraine) I Marchenko	6	6^{5}	6^{5}
(Austria) L Neumayer	4	7^{7}	7^{7}
Q	(Switzerland) J Kym	6^{5}	7^{7}	6
(France) V Royer	7^{7}	6^{2}	4
Alt	I Gakhov	4	1
7	(Argentina) M Trungelliti	6	6
3	(Moldova) R Albot	6	6^{5}	5
LL	(Croatia) M Dodig	4	7^{7}	7
Q	(Turkey) Y Erel	6^{2}	7^{7}	4
(Kazakhstan) D Popko	7^{7}	6^{5}	6
Q	(Poland) K Majchrzak	6	6
(Turkey) E Kırkın	3	1
SE	(Croatia) L Mikrut	6	6
8	(Portugal) J Faria	3	2

Second round
1	(Argentina) P Cachín	7^{7}	7^{7}
(Austria) L Neumayer	6^{5}	6^{4}
Q	(Switzerland) J Kym	1	7^{7}	7^{7}
7	(Argentina) M Trungelliti	6	6^{4}	6^{4}
LL	(Croatia) M Dodig	1	4
(Kazakhstan) D Popko	6	6
Q	(Poland) K Majchrzak	6	6
SE	(Croatia) L Mikrut	0	4

Quarterfinals
1	(Argentina) P Cachín	7^{7}	1	2
Q	(Switzerland) J Kym	6^{5}	6	6
(Kazakhstan) D Popko	1	3
Q	(Poland) K Majchrzak	6	6

Semifinals
Q	(Switzerland) J Kym	4	7	3
Q	(Poland) K Majchrzak	6	5	6

=== Bottom half ===
First round
6	(Spain) O Roca Batalla	4	4
(Spain) M Landaluce	6	6
Q	(Czech Republic) M Krumich	6	6
(Ukraine) V Sachko	3	3
(Czech Republic) D Svrčina	4	0
WC	(Slovakia) M Kližan	6	6
Q	(Romania) Sebastian Gima	3	5
4/WC	(Slovakia) J Kovalík	6	7
5	(Hungary) Z Piros	6^{1}	1
Q	A Zakharov	7^{7}	6
WC	(Slovakia) N Gombos	6	5	6
(South Korea) G Campaña Lee	2	7	4
(Argentina) GA Olivieri	4	4
(Portugal) H Rocha	6	6
(Slovakia) A Molčan	2	6	1
2	(Spain) A Ramos Viñolas	6	4	6

Second round
(Spain) M Landaluce	6	7^{9}
Q	(Czech Republic) M Krumich	3	6^{7}
WC	(Slovakia) M Kližan	6	4	2
4/WC	(Slovakia) J Kovalík	4	6	6
Q	A Zakharov	6^{5}	6^{5}
WC	(Slovakia) N Gombos	7^{7}	7^{7}
(Portugal) H Rocha	7^{8}	5	6
2	(Spain) A Ramos Viñolas	6^{6}	7	1

Quarterfinals
(Spain) M Landaluce	3	4
4/WC	(Slovakia) J Kovalík	6	6
WC	(Slovakia) N Gombos	3	1
(Portugal) H Rocha	6	6

Semifinals
4/WC	(Slovakia) J Kovalík	3	4
(Portugal) H Rocha	6	6
