= 2026 Bratislava Open – Doubles =

Doubles
- 2026 Bratislava Open

Final
- Champions: (Poland) Karol Drzewiecki (Poland) Piotr Matuszewski
- Runners-up: (Slovakia) Lukáš Pokorný (Ukraine) Vitaliy Sachko
- Score: 6–4, 7–5

Events
Singles	Doubles
- Bratislava Open

Andrew Paulson and Matěj Vocel were the defending champions but chose to defend their title with different partners. Paulson partnered Alexander Donski but lost in the first round to Lukáš Pokorný and Vitaliy Sachko. Vocel partnered Theodore Winegar but lost in the first round to Miloš Karol and Nino Serdarušić.

Karol Drzewiecki and Piotr Matuszewski won the title after defeating Pokorný and Sachko 6–4, 7–5 in the final.

== Seeds ==
1. (Czech Republic) Matěj Vocel / (United States) Theodore Winegar (first round)
2. Ivan Liutarevich / (Poland) Filip Pieczonka (first round)
3. (Bulgaria) Alexander Donski / (Czech Republic) Andrew Paulson (first round)
4. (United States) Nathaniel Lammons / (United States) Jackson Withrow (quarterfinals)

== Draw ==
Key

- Q = Qualifier
- WC = Wild card
- LL = Lucky loser
- Alt = Alternate
- ITF = ITF entry
- PR = Protected ranking
- SR = Special ranking
- SE = Special exempt
- JE = Junior exempt
- JR = Junior Accelerator Programme entrant
- CO = College Accelerator Programme entrant
- NG = Next Gen Accelerator Program entrant
- w/o = Walkover
- r = Retired
- d = Defaulted

First round
1	(Czech Republic) M Vocel (United States) T Winegar	3	2
(Slovakia) M Karol (Croatia) N Serdarušić	6	6
WC	(Slovakia) J Kovalík (Slovakia) A Martin	4	6	[10]
WC	(Slovakia) Michal Krajčí (Slovakia) Tomáš Lánik	6	1	[4]
3	(Bulgaria) A Donski (Czech Republic) A Paulson	7^{7}	3	[8]
(Slovakia) L Pokorný (Ukraine) V Sachko	6^{4}	6	[10]
(Brazil) P Boscardin Dias (Brazil) JL Reis da Silva	6	6
(Chinese Taipei) J Jung (Japan) K Uesugi	0	2
(Czech Republic) Z Kolář (Czech Republic) D Poljak	4	2
(Spain) Í Cervantes (Ukraine) D Molchanov	6	6
(Belgium) B Gadamauri (Portugal) T Pereira	3	6^{5}
4	(United States) N Lammons (United States) J Withrow	6	7^{7}
(Poland) K Drzewiecki (Poland) P Matuszewski	6	3	[10]
Alt	(Norway) V Durasovic (Ukraine) Vadym Ursu	2	6	[7]
(Czech Republic) H Bartoň (Czech Republic) F Duda	6	6
2	I Liutarevich (Poland) F Pieczonka	3	4

Quarterfinals
(Slovakia) M Karol (Croatia) N Serdarušić	6	6
WC	(Slovakia) J Kovalík (Slovakia) A Martin	2	2
(Slovakia) L Pokorný (Ukraine) V Sachko	6	6
(Brazil) P Boscardin Dias (Brazil) JL Reis da Silva	3	4
(Spain) Í Cervantes (Ukraine) D Molchanov	7	6
4	(United States) N Lammons (United States) J Withrow	5	4
(Poland) K Drzewiecki (Poland) P Matuszewski	7^{7}	7^{12}
(Czech Republic) H Bartoň (Czech Republic) F Duda	6^{5}	6^{10}

Semifinals
(Slovakia) M Karol (Croatia) N Serdarušić	6	2	[7]
(Slovakia) L Pokorný (Ukraine) V Sachko	3	6	[10]
(Spain) Í Cervantes (Ukraine) D Molchanov	3	6	[4]
(Poland) K Drzewiecki (Poland) P Matuszewski	6	2	[10]

Final
(Slovakia) L Pokorný (Ukraine) V Sachko	4	5
(Poland) K Drzewiecki (Poland) P Matuszewski	6	7
