= 2021 Bratislava Open – Singles =

Singles
- 2021 Bratislava Open

Final
- Champion: (Netherlands) Tallon Griekspoor
- Runner-up: (Argentina) Sebastián Báez
- Score: 7–6^{(8–6)}, 6–3

Events
| Singles | Doubles |
| ← 2019 · | Bratislava Open | · 2022 → |

Norbert Gombos was the defending champion but lost in the second round to Filip Horanský.

Tallon Griekspoor won the title after defeating Sebastián Báez 7–6^{(8–6)}, 6–3 in the final.

== Seeds ==
1. (Slovakia) Norbert Gombos (second round)
2. (Argentina) Federico Coria (second round)
3. (Bolivia) Hugo Dellien (first round)
4. (Slovakia) Jozef Kovalík (second round)
5. (Netherlands) Tallon Griekspoor (champion)
6. (Argentina) Juan Manuel Cerúndolo (second round)
7. (Slovenia) Blaž Rola (first round)
8. (Portugal) Frederico Ferreira Silva (second round)

== Draw ==
=== Key ===
- Q = Qualifier
- WC = Wild card
- LL = Lucky loser
- Alt = Alternate
- SE = Special exempt
- PR = Protected ranking
- ITF = ITF entry
- JE = Junior exempt
- w/o = Walkover
- r = Retired
- d = Defaulted
- SR = Special ranking

=== Finals ===
Semifinals
(Slovakia) Filip Horanský | 7^{8} | 4 | 6^{7}
(Argentina) Sebastián Báez | 6^{6} | 6 | 7^{9}
(Slovakia) Martin Kližan | 4 | 7 | 4
5 | (Netherlands) Tallon Griekspoor | 6 | 5 | 6

Final
(Argentina) Sebastián Báez | 6^{6} | 3
5 | (Netherlands) Tallon Griekspoor | 7^{8} | 6

=== Top half ===
First round
1 | (Slovakia) N Gombos | 6 | 6
(Germany) Y Maden | 3 | 3
(Germany) M Marterer | 2 | 4
(Slovakia) F Horanský | 6 | 6
(Morocco) E Benchetrit | 5 | 2
(Turkey) C İlkel | 7 | 6
(Argentina) F Mena | 6 | 6
7 | (Slovenia) B Rola | 4 | 2
4 | (Slovakia) J Kovalík | 6 | 6
Q | (Czech Republic) V Kopřiva | 4 | 2
(France) Q Halys | 6^{3} | 2
(Germany) M Bachinger | 7^{7} | 6
(Argentina) S Báez | 1 | 6 | 6
(Argentina) R Olivo | 6 | 1 | 3
(Germany) T Kamke | 4 | 4
8 | (Portugal) F Ferreira Silva | 6 | 6

Second round
1 | (Slovakia) N Gombos | 2 | 2
(Slovakia) F Horanský | 6 | 6
(Turkey) C İlkel | 6 | 6
(Argentina) F Mena | 3 | 4
4 | (Slovakia) J Kovalík | 7^{7} | 1 | 4
(Germany) M Bachinger | 6^{1} | 6 | 6
(Argentina) S Báez | 6 | 5 | 6
8 | (Portugal) F Ferreira Silva | 3 | 7 | 4

Quarterfinals
(Slovakia) F Horanský | 6 | 6
(Turkey) C İlkel | 3 | 4
(Germany) M Bachinger | 6^{6} | 6^{0}
(Argentina) S Báez | 7^{8} | 7^{7}

Semifinals
(Slovakia) F Horanský | 7^{8} | 4 | 6^{7}
(Argentina) S Báez | 6^{6} | 6 | 7^{9}

=== Bottom half ===
First round
6 | (Argentina) JM Cerúndolo | 6 | 6
WC | (Slovakia) M Karol | 4 | 2
(Germany) M Moraing | 6^{2} | 7^{7} | 5
(Slovakia) M Kližan | 7^{7} | 6^{3} | 7
WC | (Slovakia) A Molčan | 7^{8} | 6
Q | (Croatia) D Ajduković | 6^{6} | 4
PR | (Russia) A Kuznetsov | 6 | 4 | 6
3 | (Bolivia) H Dellien | 2 | 6 | 3
5 | (Netherlands) T Griekspoor | 7^{7} | 7^{7}
Q | (Belarus) U Ignatik | 6^{1} | 6^{2}
LL | (Austria) L Miedler | 2 | 4
(Canada) S Diez | 6 | 6
WC | (Slovakia) L Klein | 6 | 3 | 6^{4}
Q | (Czech Republic) J Lehečka | 4 | 6 | 7^{7}
(Czech Republic) Z Kolář | 7^{8} | 0 | 5
2 | (Argentina) F Coria | 6^{6} | 6 | 7

Second round
6 | (Argentina) JM Cerúndolo | 7^{7} | 3 | 5
(Slovakia) M Kližan | 6^{0} | 6 | 7
WC | (Slovakia) A Molčan | 4 | 4
PR | (Russia) A Kuznetsov | 6 | 6
5 | (Netherlands) T Griekspoor | 6 | 3 | 6
(Canada) S Diez | 4 | 6 | 4
Q | (Czech Republic) J Lehečka | 7^{7} | 7^{8}
2 | (Argentina) F Coria | 6^{5} | 6^{6}

Quarterfinals
(Slovakia) M Kližan | 7^{7} | 6
PR | (Russia) A Kuznetsov | 6^{4} | 2
5 | (Netherlands) T Griekspoor | 2 | 6 | 6
Q | (Czech Republic) J Lehečka | 6 | 3 | 2

Semifinals
(Slovakia) M Kližan | 4 | 7 | 4
5 | (Netherlands) T Griekspoor | 6 | 5 | 6
