= 2021 Bratislava Open =

Slovak tennis tournament

- Date: 7–13 June
- Edition: 2nd
- Category: ATP Challenger Tour
- Surface: Clay
- Location: Bratislava, Slovakia

Champions

Singles
- (Netherlands) Tallon Griekspoor

Doubles
- (Ukraine) Denys Molchanov / (Kazakhstan) Aleksandr Nedovyesov
← 2019 ·	Bratislava Open	· 2022 →

The 2021 Bratislava Open was a professional tennis tournament played on clay courts. It was the 2nd edition of the tournament which was part of the 2021 ATP Challenger Tour. It took place in Bratislava, Slovakia between 7 and 13 June 2021.

== Singles main-draw entrants ==
=== Seeds ===
Country	Player	Rank^{1}	Seed
SVK	Norbert Gombos	81	1
ARG	Federico Coria	94	2
BOL	Hugo Dellien	124	3
SVK	Jozef Kovalík	127	4
NED	Tallon Griekspoor	131	5
ARG	Juan Manuel Cerúndolo	147	6
SLO	Blaž Rola	155	7
POR	Frederico Ferreira Silva	168	8

- ^{1} Rankings are as of 31 May 2021.

=== Other entrants ===
The following players received wildcards into the singles main draw:

- (Slovakia) Miloš Karol
- (Slovakia) Lukáš Klein
- (Slovakia) Alex Molčan

The following player received entry into the singles main draw using a protected ranking:

- (Russia) Andrey Kuznetsov

The following players received entry from the qualifying draw:

- (Croatia) Duje Ajduković
- (Belarus) Uladzimir Ignatik
- (Czech Republic) Vít Kopřiva
- (Czech Republic) Jiří Lehečka

The following player received entry as a lucky loser:

- (Austria) Lucas Miedler

== Champions ==
=== Singles ===
- (Netherlands) Tallon Griekspoor def. (Argentina) Sebastián Báez 7–6^{(8–6)}, 6–3.

=== Doubles ===
- (Ukraine) Denys Molchanov / (Kazakhstan) Aleksandr Nedovyesov def. (Netherlands) Sander Arends / (Venezuela) Luis David Martínez 7–6^{(7–5)}, 6–1.
