= 2026 Bratislava Open =

Slovak tennis tournament

- Date: 8–14 June
- Edition: 7th
- Category: ATP Challenger Tour
- Surface: Clay
- Location: Bratislava, Slovakia

Champions

Singles
- (Japan) Taro Daniel

Doubles
- (Poland) Karol Drzewiecki / (Poland) Piotr Matuszewski
- Bratislava Open

The 2026 Bratislava Open was a professional tennis tournament played on clay courts. It was the seventh edition of the tournament which was part of the 2026 ATP Challenger Tour. It took place in Bratislava, Slovakia between 8 and 14 June 2026.

== Singles main-draw entrants ==
=== Seeds ===
Country	Player	Rank^{1}	Seed
KAZ	Alexander Shevchenko	88	1
USA	Emilio Nava	94	2
GBR	Jan Choinski	101	3
~~SVK~~	~~Alex Molčan~~	~~110~~	~~4~~
CHI	Tomás Barrios Vera	136	5
CZE	Zdeněk Kolář	162	6
HUN	Zsombor Piros	173	7
TPE	Tseng Chun-hsin	181	8

- ^{1} Rankings are as of 25 May 2026.

=== Other entrants ===
The following players received wildcards into the singles main draw:

- (Slovakia) Norbert Gombos
- (Australia) Thanasi Kokkinakis
- (Slovakia) Lukáš Pokorný

The following player received entry into the singles main draw using a protected ranking:

- (Chinese Taipei) Jason Jung

The following player received entry into the singles main draw as a special exempt:

- (Bulgaria) Alexander Donski

The following players received entry into the singles main draw through the Next Gen Accelerator programme:

- (Czech Republic) Petr Brunclík
- (Czech Republic) Maxim Mrva

The following player received entry into the singles main draw as an alternate:

- (Germany) Marko Topo

The following players received entry from the qualifying draw:

- (Czech Republic) Hynek Bartoň
- (Japan) Taro Daniel
- (Belgium) Buvaysar Gadamauri
- (Czech Republic) Martin Krumich
- (Slovakia) Andrej Martin
- (Jordan) Abdullah Shelbayh

The following players received entry as lucky losers:

- (Bulgaria) Dimitar Kuzmanov
- (Japan) Akira Santillan

== Champions ==
=== Singles ===
- (Japan) Taro Daniel def. (Kazakhstan) Alexander Shevchenko 3–6, 6–0, 7–6^{(7–2)}.

=== Doubles ===
- (Poland) Karol Drzewiecki / (Poland) Piotr Matuszewski def. (Slovakia) Lukáš Pokorný / (Ukraine) Vitaliy Sachko 6–4, 7–5.
