= 2024 Bratislava Open =

Slovak tennis tournament

- Date: 10–16 June
- Edition: 5th
- Category: ATP Challenger Tour
- Surface: Clay
- Location: Bratislava, Slovakia

Champions

Singles
- (Poland) Kamil Majchrzak

Doubles
- (Germany) Jakob Schnaitter / (Germany) Mark Wallner
- Bratislava Open

The 2024 Bratislava Open was a professional tennis tournament played on clay courts. It was the fifth edition of the tournament which was part of the 2024 ATP Challenger Tour. It took place in Bratislava, Slovakia between 10 and 16 June 2024.

== Singles main-draw entrants ==
=== Seeds ===
Country	Player	Rank^{1}	Seed
ARG	Pedro Cachín	108	1
ESP	Albert Ramos Viñolas	111	2
MDA	Radu Albot	140	3
SVK	Jozef Kovalík	145	4
HUN	Zsombor Piros	154	5
ESP	Oriol Roca Batalla	164	6
ARG	Marco Trungelliti	169	7
POR	Jaime Faria	183	8

- ^{1} Rankings are as of 27 May 2024.

=== Other entrants ===
The following players received wildcards into the singles main draw:

- (Slovakia) Norbert Gombos
- (Slovakia) Martin Kližan
- (Slovakia) Jozef Kovalík

The following player received entry into the singles main draw as a special exempt:

- (Croatia) Luka Mikrut

The following player received entry into the singles main draw as an alternate:

- Ivan Gakhov

The following players received entry from the qualifying draw:

- (Turkey) Yankı Erel
- (Romania) Sebastian Gima
- (Czech Republic) Martin Krumich
- (Switzerland) Jérôme Kym
- (Poland) Kamil Majchrzak
- Alexey Zakharov

The following player received entry as a lucky loser:

- (Croatia) Matej Dodig

== Champions ==
=== Singles ===
- (Poland) Kamil Majchrzak def. (Portugal) Henrique Rocha 6–0, 2–6, 6–3.

=== Doubles ===
- (Germany) Jakob Schnaitter / (Germany) Mark Wallner def. (Slovakia) Miloš Karol / (Slovakia) Tomáš Lánik 6–4, 6–4.
