= 2022 Bratislava Open =

Slovak tennis tournament

- Date: 6–12 June
- Edition: 3rd
- Category: ATP Challenger Tour
- Surface: Clay
- Location: Bratislava, Slovakia

Champions

Singles
- Alexander Shevchenko

Doubles
- (India) Sriram Balaji / (India) Jeevan Nedunchezhiyan
- Bratislava Open

The 2022 Kooperativa Bratislava Open was a professional tennis tournament played on clay courts. It was the 3rd edition of the tournament which was part of the 2022 ATP Challenger Tour. It took place in Bratislava, Slovakia between 6 and 12 June 2022.

== Singles main-draw entrants ==
=== Seeds ===
| Country | Player | Rank^{1} | Seed |
|---|---|---|---|
| ~~SUI~~ | ~~Henri Laaksonen~~ | ~~96~~ | ~~1~~ |
| TPE | Tseng Chun-hsin | 108 | 2 |
| SVK | Norbert Gombos | 111 | 3 |
| SVK | Andrej Martin | 127 | 4 |
| CZE | Zdeněk Kolář | 133 | 5 |
| AUT | Dennis Novak | 149 | 6 |
| CZE | Vít Kopřiva | 167 | 7 |
| KAZ | Dmitry Popko | 176 | 8 |

- ^{1} Rankings are as of 23 May 2022.

=== Other entrants ===
The following players received wildcards into the singles main draw:

- (Slovakia) Miloš Karol
- (Slovakia) Lukáš Klein
- (Slovakia) Peter Benjamín Privara

The following player received entry into the singles main draw using a protected ranking:

- (Hungary) ~~Attila Balázs~~

The following player received entry into the singles main draw as an alternate:

- (Brazil) Daniel Dutra da Silva

The following players received entry from the qualifying draw:

- Evgeny Karlovskiy
- (Ukraine) Oleksii Krutykh
- (Hungary) Fábián Marozsán
- (Spain) Alejandro Moro Cañas
- (Switzerland) Johan Nikles
- (Ukraine) Oleg Prihodko

The following players received entry as lucky losers:

- (Romania) Filip Jianu
- (Germany) Louis Wessels

== Champions ==
=== Singles ===
- Alexander Shevchenko def. (Italy) Riccardo Bonadio 6–3, 7–5.

=== Doubles ===
- (India) Sriram Balaji / (India) Jeevan Nedunchezhiyan def. (Ukraine) Vladyslav Manafov / (Ukraine) Oleg Prihodko 7–6^{(8–6)}, 6–4.
