= Dino Prižmić =

Croatian tennis player (born 2005)

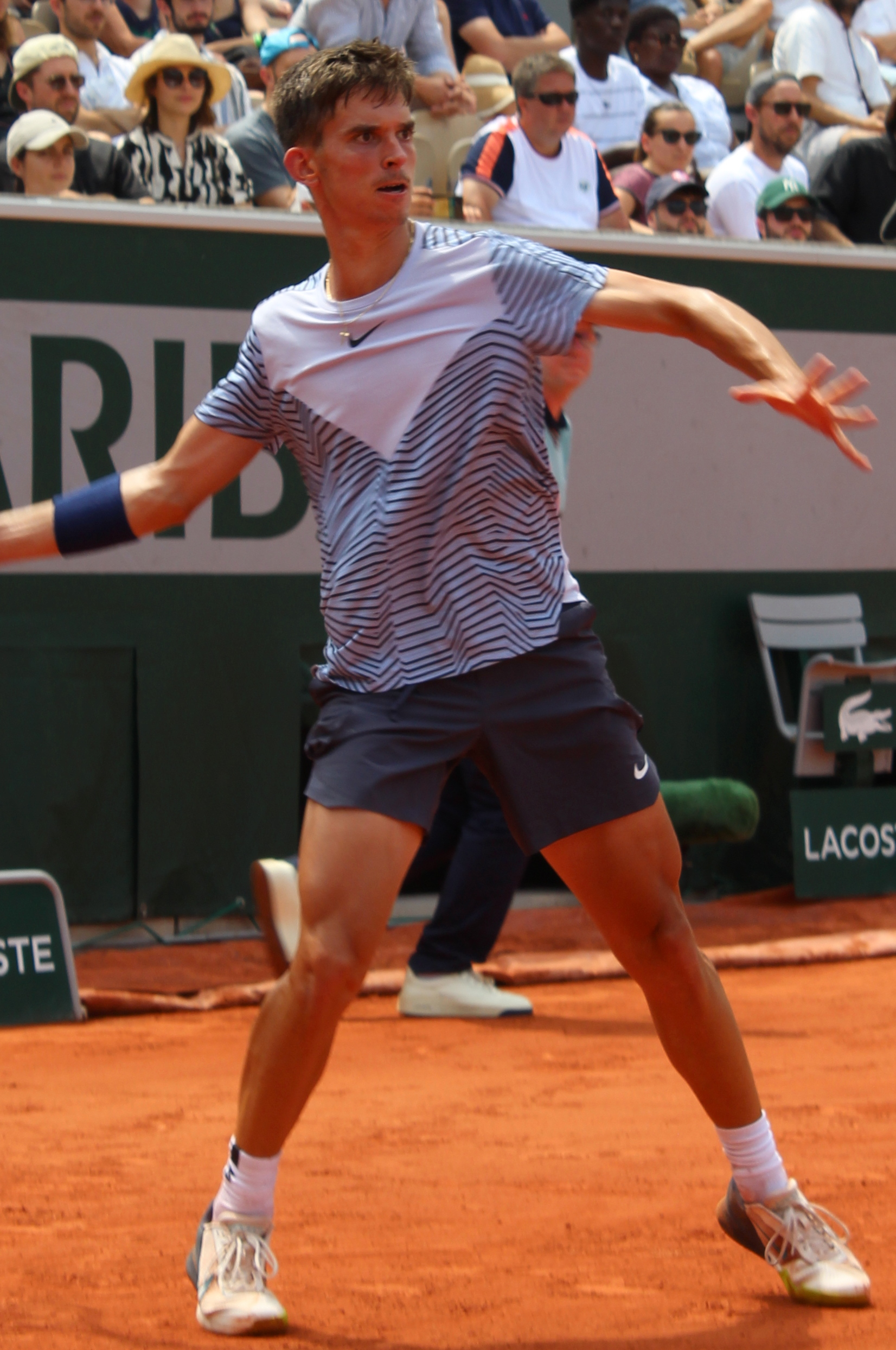
- Prižmić at the 2023 French Open boys' singles
- Country (sports): Croatia
- Born: 5 August 2005 (age 21) Split, Croatia
- Height: 1.88 m (6 ft 2 in)
- Plays: Right-handed (two-handed backhand)
- Coach: Luka Kutanjac, Miro Hrvatin (2023-2025)
- Prize money: US $1,293,400

Singles
- Career record: 19–22 (at ATP Tour level, Grand Slam level, and in Davis Cup)
- Career titles: 0
- Highest ranking: No. 70 (8 June 2026)
- Current ranking: No. 89 (9 November 2026)

Grand Slam singles results
- Australian Open: 1R (2024, 2026)
- French Open: 2R (2026)
- Wimbledon: 2R (2026)
- US Open: 2R (2026)

Doubles
- Career record: 0–0 (at ATP Tour level, Grand Slam level, and in Davis Cup)
- Career titles: 0
- Highest ranking: No. 1,444 (16 January 2023)

Grand Slam doubles results
- Wimbledon: 1R (2026)
- US Open: 1R (2026)

Team competitions
- Davis Cup: 0–2
- Last updated on: 8 June 2026.

Dino Prižmić (born 5 August 2005) is a Croatian professional tennis player. He has a career-high ATP singles ranking of world No. 70 achieved on 8 June 2026 and a doubles ranking of No. 1,444 reached on 16 January 2023. He is currently the No. 2 singles player from Croatia.

Prižmić has won three singles titles on the ATP Challenger Tour. He represents Croatia at the Davis Cup.

== Junior career ==
Prižmić reached two finals in the European Junior Championships, the first in 2019 in the under 14s and then in 2022 in the under 18s, but lost both of them.

He won the boys' singles title at the 2023 French Open, defeating eighth seed Juan Carlos Prado Ángelo in the final.

He had good results on the ITF junior circuit, maintaining a 91–27 singles win-loss record, and reached an ITF junior combined ranking of world No. 8 on 2 January 2023.

== Professional career ==
=== 2022: ATP debut ===
In April 2022, Prižmić reached his first ITF final at a clay-court tournament in Dubrovnik, Croatia, where he lost to Gergely Madarász in straight sets.

Prižmić made his ATP debut in the singles draw of the 2022 Croatia Open Umag as a wildcard, where he lost to Bernabé Zapata Miralles in the first round by retirement.

=== 2023: First ATP win & Challenger title, Davis Cup, top 155 debuts ===
With his fifth ITF title in Poreč, Croatia, Prižmić became the best under-18 player in the world at No. 381 on 20 March 2023.

In April, Prižmić then qualified for the Banja Luka Open in Bosnia and Herzegovina, but fell to Richard Gasquet in the first round. A few months later, he received a wildcard into the Croatia Open and defeated Duje Ajduković in the first round to record his first ATP victory. He then defeated Zsombor Piros to reach his maiden ATP quarterfinal, losing to eventual champion Alexei Popyrin.

In August, Prižmić competed at the Banja Luka Challenger and won his maiden Challenger title. Shortly after he was appointed by coach Vedran Martić to the Croatia Davis Cup team, alongside Borna Ćorić, Borna Gojo, Ivan Dodig and Mate Pavić.

In October, Prižmić qualified for the main draw of the Stockholm Open where he defeated sixth seed and world No. 30 Jiří Lehečka in the first round, his first-ever win over a Top 50 player. He reached a career-high singles ranking of No. 155 on 23 October 2023.

=== 2024-2025: Major, Top 125 debuts, NextGen Finals ===
At the Australian Open, Prižmić defeated Mariano Navone, Duje Ajduković and Aziz Dougaz to qualify for his first Grand Slam. In his Grand Slam main-draw debut, Prižmić faced defending champion and world No. 1 Novak Djokovic, winning 16 games and saving 6 match points before losing in four sets in a four-hour match; it was the longest first-round match in Djokovic's Grand Slam career. He received a special main-draw entry at the 2024 BMW Open in Munich under the NextGen programme for players under 20 ranked in the top 250 but later withdrew.

Following back-to-back Challenger titles at the 2025 Zagreb Open and the 2025 Bratislava Open, Prižmić returned to the top 175 on 16 June 2026, moving 77 spots up in the singles rankings on 16 June 2025. He became just the second Croatian, with Mario Ančić, to win three Challenger titles as a teenager. Ranked at a career high of world No. 124, Prižmić qualified for the main draw of a major for the second time at the 2025 US Open.

Ranked No. 122 at the 2025 Chengdu Open where Prižmić also received a NextGen special main draw entry, Prižmić defeated Térence Atmane.

In November, the Croatian officially qualified for the 2025 Next Gen ATP Finals.

=== 2026: Masters debut & first top 10 wins, top 100 ===
Prižmić qualified for his first Masters main draw at the 2026 BNP Paribas Open and defeated Tristan Schoolkate for his first Masters win.

In Madrid, playing through qualifications, Prižmić upset fourth seed Ben Shelton in the second round to record his first top-10 win, before losing to Tomas Martin Etcheverry in the next round. Ranked No. 79, he also qualified for Rome, where he defeated Marton Fucsovics. In his second-round meeting with third seed Novak Djokovic, he recorded his first top-5 win. He reached the round of 16 of a Masters 1000 for the first time with a win over 31st seed Ugo Humbert. As a result, he reached a new career-high ranking of No. 68.

== Performance timeline ==
Key
W	F	SF	QF	#R	RR	Q#	DNQ	A	NH

(W) winner; (F) finalist; (SF) semifinalist; (QF) quarterfinalist; (#R) rounds 4, 3, 2, 1; (RR) round-robin stage; (Q#) qualification round; (DNQ) did not qualify; (A) absent; (NH) not held; (SR) strike rate (events won / competed); (W–L) win–loss record.

=== Singles ===
Current through the 2026 Cincinnati Open.

Tournament	2023	2024	2025	2026	SR	W–L	Win%
Grand Slam tournaments
Australian Open	A	1R	A	1R	0 / 2	0–2	0%
French Open	A	Q1	A	2R	0 / 1	1–1	50%
Wimbledon	A	Q2	A	2R	0 / 1	1–1	50%
US Open	A	Q1	1R		0 / 1	0–1	0%
Win–loss	0–0	0–1	0–1	2–3	0 / 5	2–5	29%
National representation
Davis Cup	RR	A	2R		0 / 3	3–3	50%
ATP 1000 tournaments
Indian Wells Open	A	A	A	2R	0 / 1	1–1	50%
Miami Open	A	A	A	A	0 / 0	0–0	–
Monte-Carlo Masters	A	A	A	A	0 / 0	0–0	–
Madrid Open	A	A	A	3R	0 / 1	2–1	67%
Italian Open	A	A	A	4R	0 / 1	3–1	75%
Canadian Open	A	A	A	A	0 / 0	0–0	–
Cincinnati Open	A	A	A	1R	0 / 1	0–1	0%
Shanghai Masters	A	A	A		0 / 0	0–0	–
Paris Masters	A	A	A		0 / 0	0–0	–
Win–loss	0–0	0–0	0–0	6–4	0 / 4	6–4	60%
Career statistics
Tournaments (Note: 2022 ATP Tournaments: 1)	3	2	3	11	Career total: 20		
Titles	0	0	0	1	Career total: 1		
Finals	0	0	0	1	Career total: 1		
Overall win–loss	3–5	0–2	5–6	13–11	21–25		
Win Percentage	38%	0%	45%	54%	46%		
Year-end ranking (Note: 2022: ATP ranking–475)	178	292	127		$1,490,452		

== ATP Challenger Tour finals ==
=== Singles: 7 (3 titles, 4 runner-ups) ===
Legend ATP Challenger Tour (3–4)	Finals by surface Hard (0–1) Clay (3–3)

Result	W–L	Date	Tournament	Tier	Surface	Opponent	Score
Win	1–0	Aug 2023	Banja Luka Challenger, Bosnia and Herzegovina	Challenger	Clay	(Belgium) Kimmer Coppejans	6–2, 6–3
Win	2–0	May 2025	Zagreb Open, Croatia	Challenger	Clay	(France) Luca Van Assche	6–2, ret.
Win	3–0	Jun 2025	Bratislava Open, Slovakia	Challenger	Clay	(France) Valentin Royer	6–4, 7–6^{(8–6)}
Loss	3–1	Jun 2025	Aspria Tennis Cup, Italy	Challenger	Clay	(Italy) Marco Cecchinato	2–6, 3–6
Loss	3–2	Jul 2025	San Marino Open, San Marino	Challenger	Clay	(Slovakia) Lukáš Klein	3–6, 4–6
Loss	3–3	Aug 2025	Kozerki Open, Poland	Challenger	Hard	(Poland) Kamil Majchrzak	4–6, 3–6
Loss	3–4	Apr 2026	Monza Open, Italy	Challenger	Clay	(Belgium) Raphaël Collignon	6–7^{(2–7)}, 3–6

== ITF World Tennis Tour finals ==
=== Singles: 6 (5 titles, 1 runner-up) ===
Legend ITF WTT (5–1)	Finals by surface Hard (4–0) Clay (1–1)

Result	W–L	Date	Tournament	Tier	Surface	Opponent	Score
Loss	0–1	Apr 2022	M15 Dubrovnik, Croatia	WTT	Clay	(Hungary) Gergely Madarász	2–6, 0–6
Win	1–1	Oct 2022	M15 Heraklion, Greece	WTT	Hard	(Spain) Mario González Fernández	6–2, 6–1
Win	2–1	Dec 2022	M15 Monastir, Tunisia	WTT	Hard	(France) Alexis Gautier	7–6^{(7–4)}, 3–6, 6–3
Win	3–1	Dec 2022	M15 Monastir, Tunisia	WTT	Hard	(France) Constantin Bittoun Kouzmine	6–2, 7–5
Win	4–1	Dec 2022	M15 Monastir, Tunisia	WTT	Hard	(United States) Omni Kumar	6–3, 7–5
Win	5–1	Mar 2023	M15 Poreč, Croatia	WTT	Clay	(Switzerland) Mirko Martinez	6–3, 6–2

== National and international representation ==
=== Davis Cup: 2 (2 defeats) ===
Group membership Finals (0–2) Qualifying Round (0–0)	Matches by surface Hard (0–2) Clay (0–0) Grass (0–0)	Matches by type Singles (0–2) Doubles (0–0)	Matches by venue Home (0–2) Away (0–0) Neutral (0–0)

- ▲ ▼ indicates the outcome of the Davis Cup match followed by the score, date, place of event, the zonal classification and its phase, and the court surface.

Result	No.	Rubber	Match type (partner if any)	Opponent nation	Opponent player(s)	Score
▼1–2; 13 September 2023; Arena Gripe, Split, Croatia; Davis Cup Final Group D round robin; hard (indoor) surface
Defeat	1	I	Singles	United States	Mackenzie McDonald	2–6, 4–6
▼1–2; 15 September 2023; Arena Gripe, Split, Croatia; Davis Cup Final Group D round robin; hard (indoor) surface
Defeat	2	I	Singles	Finland	Otto Virtanen	4–6, 6–3, 3–6

== Junior Grand Slam finals ==
=== Singles: 1 (title) ===
Result	Year	Tournament	Surface	Opponent	Score
Win	2023	French Open	Clay	(Bolivia) Juan Carlos Prado Ángelo	6–1, 6–4

== Wins over top-10 players ==
- Prižmić has a 2–2 (50%) match record against players who were, at the time the match was played, ranked in the top 10.

Season	2026	Total
Wins	2	2

#	Player	Rk	Event	Surface	Rd	Score	Rk	Ref
2026
1.	(United States) Ben Shelton	6	Madrid Open, Spain	Clay	2R	6–4, 6–7^{(4–7)}, 7–6^{(7–5)}	87	
2.	(Serbia) Novak Djokovic	4	Italian Open, Italy	Clay	2R	2–6, 6–2, 6–4	79	

- Key: (Rk) first use, opponent rank; (Rd) round; (Rk) 2nd use, player rank; (Ref) reference; (F) final; (SF) semifinal; (QF) quarterfinal; (#R) rounds 4, 3, 2, 1; (RR) round-robin stage; (Q#) qualifying rounds or stages (3), 2, 1.

*As of 8 May 2026
