= Piotr Matuszewski =

Polish tennis player

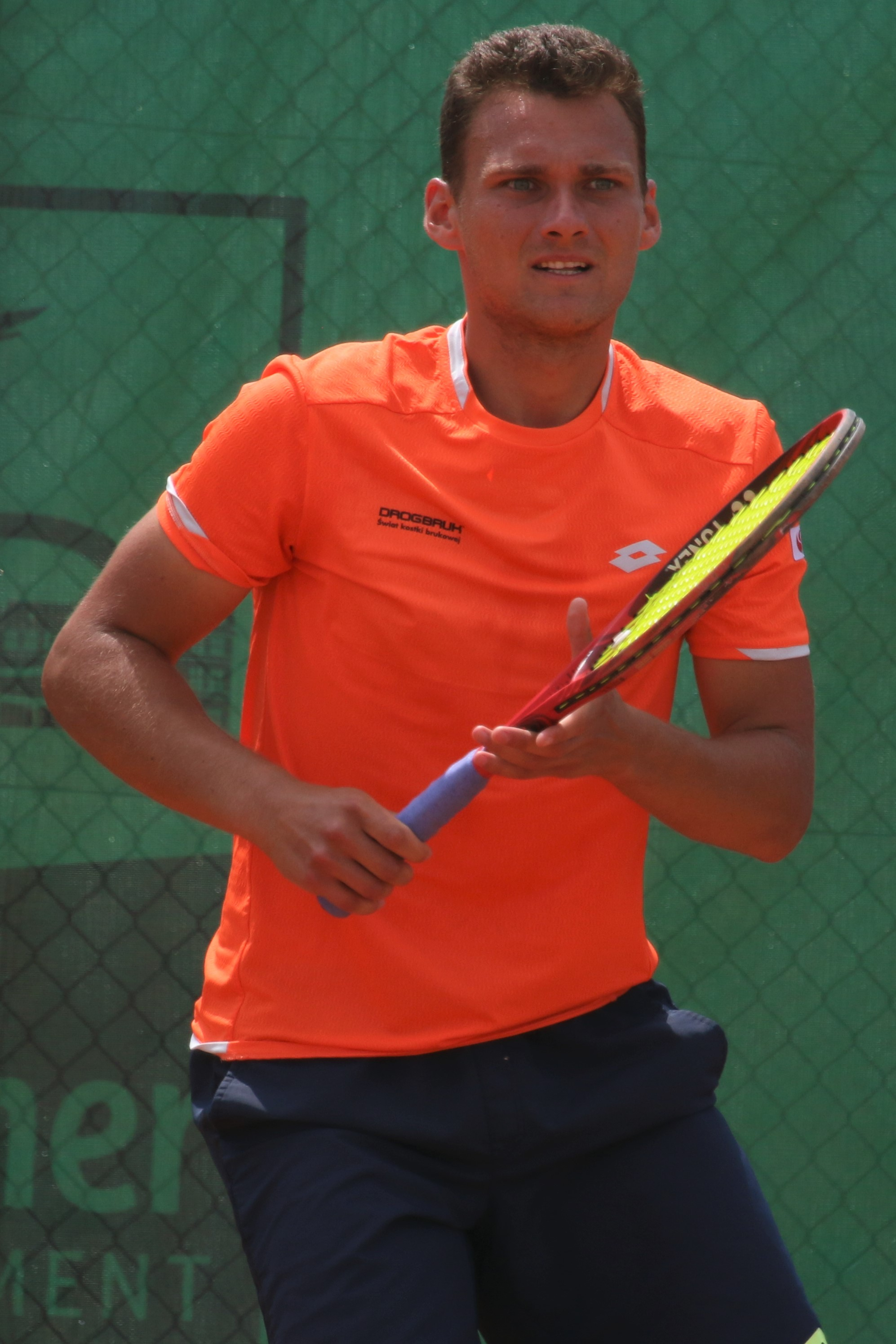
- Matuszewski at the 2022 Internationaux de Tennis de Blois
- Country (sports): Poland
- Born: 22 April 1998 (age 28) Ostrów Wielkopolski, Poland
- Height: 1.88 m (6 ft 2 in)
- Plays: Right-handed (two-handed backhand)
- Coach: Michal Matuszewski
- Prize money: US $218,840

Singles
- Highest ranking: No. 763 (2 October 2017)

Doubles
- Career record: 2–6
- Career titles: 10 Challenger, 17 Futures
- Highest ranking: No. 77 (24 February 2025)
- Current ranking: No. 117 (14 September 2026)

Grand Slam doubles results
- French Open: 1R (2025)
- Wimbledon: 1R (2025)
- Last updated on: 16 September 2026.

Piotr Matuszewski (born 22 April 1998) is a Polish tennis player who specializes in doubles. He has a career high ATP doubles ranking of world No. 77 achieved on 24 February 2025 and a singles ranking of No. 763 achieved on 2 October 2017. Matuszewski has won eight ATP Challenger doubles titles.

== ATP Challenger and ITF Tour finals ==
=== Doubles: 59 (30–29) ===
Legend ATP Challenger (11–21) ITF Futures (19–8)	Finals by surface Hard (8–8) Clay (21–21) Carpet (1–0)

Result	W–L	Date	Category	Tournament	Surface	Partner	Opponents	Score
Win	1–0	Jun 2016	Futures	Poland F3, Sopot	Clay	(Poland) Kacper Żuk	(Poland) Andriej Kapaś (Poland) Adam Majchrowicz	7–6^{(7–5)}, 6–3
Win	2–0	Oct 2016	Futures	Egypt F27, Sharm El Sheikh	Hard	(Poland) Kacper Żuk	(Italy) Antonio Massara (Italy) Andrea Vavassori	6–3, 6–2
Win	3–0	Oct 2016	Futures	Czech Republic F9, Opava	Carpet	(Poland) Grzegorz Panfil	(Slovakia) Lukáš Klein (Slovakia) Patrik Nema	6–1, 6–3
Win	4–0	Nov 2016	Futures	Egypt F34, Sharm El Sheikh	Hard	(Poland) Kacper Żuk	(Poland) Kamil Gajewski (Poland) Szymon Walków	3–6, 6–2, [10–7]
Loss	4–1	Apr 2017	Futures	Egypt F11, Sharm El Sheikh	Hard	(Poland) Kacper Żuk	(Netherlands) Gijs Brouwer (Netherlands) Jelle Sels	5–7, 1–6
Win	5–1	Oct 2017	Futures	Egypt F27, Sharm El Sheikh	Hard	(Poland) Kacper Żuk	(Czech Republic) Marek Gengel (Czech Republic) Tomas Papik	6–2, 6–2
Loss	5–2	May 2019	World Tennis Tour	M15 Irpin, Ukraine	Clay	(United States) Michael Zhu	(Ukraine) Georgii Kravchenko (Ukraine) Oleg Prihodko	3–6, 2–6
Win	6–2	Aug 2019	World Tennis Tour	M25 Poznań, Poland	Clay	(Poland) Mateusz Kowalczyk	(Ecuador) Diego Hidalgo (Brazil) Pedro Sakamoto	6–3, 6–4
Win	7–2	Sep 2019	World Tennis Tour	M25 Varna, Bulgaria	Clay	(France) Quentin Folliot	(Argentina) Juan Ignacio Galarza (Argentina) Dante Gennaro	6–1, 6–2
Loss	7–3	Oct 2019	World Tennis Tour	M15 Sharm El Sheikh, Egypt	Hard	(Poland) Daniel Michalski	(United Kingdom) Julian Cash (Poland) Jan Zieliński	6–7^{(2–7)}, 6–7^{(3–7)}
Loss	7–4	Nov 2019	World Tennis Tour	M15 Sharm El Sheikh, Egypt	Hard	(Poland) Kacper Żuk	(Kazakhstan) Sagadat Ayap (Germany) Kai Lemstra	1–6, 6–7^{(2–7)}
Win	8–4	Nov 2019	World Tennis Tour	M15 Sharm El Sheikh, Egypt	Hard	(Poland) Maciej Smoła	(Ukraine) Volodymyr Uzhylovskyi; Alexey Zakharov	6–2, 6–1
Loss	8–5	Nov 2019	World Tennis Tour	M15 Cairo, Egypt	Clay	(Poland) Daniel Michalski	(Italy) Fabrizio Ornago (Argentina) Matias Zukas	2–3 RET
Win	9–5	Feb 2020	World Tennis Tour	M15 Sharm El Sheikh, Egypt	Hard	(Czech Republic) David Poljak	(Spain) Jose Fco Vidal Azorin (Spain) Pablo Vivero Gonzalez	6–4, 7–6^{(8–6)}
Win	10–5	Jan 2021	World Tennis Tour	M15 Cairo, Egypt	Clay	(Italy) Franco Agamenone	(Japan) Naoki Tajima (Spain) Jose Fco Vidal Azorin	4–6, 7–6^{(7–5)}, [10–7]
Loss	10–6	Apr 2021	World Tennis Tour	M15 Monastir, Tunisia	Hard	(Italy) Franco Agamenone	(Tunisia) Aziz Dougaz (Zimbabwe) Benjamin Lock	6–7^{(2–7)}, 6–3, [9–11]
Win	11–6	Apr 2021	World Tennis Tour	M15 Monastir, Tunisia	Hard	(Italy) Franco Agamenone	(Brazil) Mateus Alves (Brazil) Igor Marcondes	7–6^{(9–7)}, 7–5
Win	12–6	May 2021	World Tennis Tour	M25 Prague, Czech Republic	Clay	(Italy) Franco Agamenone	(Czech Republic) Andrew Paulson (Czech Republic) Patrik Rikl	6–4, 6–3
Win	13–6	May 2021	World Tennis Tour	M25 Most, Czech Republic	Clay	(Italy) Franco Agamenone	(Netherlands) Gijs Brouwer (Netherlands) Mats Hermans	6–1, 7–5
Loss	13–7	Jun 2021	World Tennis Tour	M25 Grasse, France	Clay	(Italy) Franco Agamenone	(France) Dan Added (Switzerland) Leandro Riedi	1–6, 4–6
Win	14–7	Aug 2021	World Tennis Tour	M25 Grodzisk Mazowiecki, Poland	Clay	(Netherlands) Mats Hermans	(Brazil) Gilbert Klier Junior (Brazil) Pedro Sakamoto	6–4, 7–5
Loss	14–8	Aug 2021	Challenger	Warsaw, Poland	Clay	(Ukraine) Vladyslav Manafov	(Mexico) Hans Hach Verdugo (Mexico) Miguel Ángel Reyes-Varela	4–6, 4–6
Loss	14–9	Dec 2021	Challenger	Maia, Portugal	Clay	(Austria) David Pichler	(Portugal) Nuno Borges (Portugal) Francisco Cabral	4–6, 5–7
Loss	14–10	May 2022	Challenger	Troisdorf, Germany	Clay	(Germany) Hendrik Jebens	(Jamaica) Dustin Brown (United States) Evan King	4–6, 5–7
Win	15–10	Nov 2022	Challenger	Montevideo, Uruguay	Clay	(Poland) Karol Drzewiecki	(Argentina) Facundo Díaz Acosta (Venezuela) Luis David Martínez	6–4, 6–4
Win	16–10	Apr 2023	World Tennis Tour	M25 Split, Croatia	Clay	(Ukraine) Oleg Prihodko	(Poland) Maks Kaśnikowski (Switzerland) Jerome Kym	6–2, 7–6^{(8–6)}
Win	17–10	May 2023	World Tennis Tour	M25 Santa Margherita di Pula, Italy	Clay	(Germany) Kai Wehnelt	Mikalai Haliak (Italy) Augusto Virgili	7–6^{(7–1)}, 7–6^{(8–6)}
Loss	17–11	May 2023	World Tennis Tour	M25 Reggio Emilia, Italy	Clay	(Germany) Kai Wehnelt	(Italy) Francesco Forti (Italy) Julian Ocleppo	3–6, 7–6^{(7–2)}, [7–10]
Win	18–11	Jul 2023	Challenger	Tampere, Finland	Clay	(Poland) Szymon Kielan	(Ukraine) Vladyslav Orlov (Australia) Adam Taylor	6–4, 7–6^{(9–7)}
Win	19–11	Aug 2023	World Tennis Tour	M25 Poznań, Poland	Clay	(Germany) Kai Wehnelt	(Netherlands) Sander Jong (Netherlands) Jesse Timmermans	3–6, 7–6^{(7–3)}, [10–4]
Loss	19–12	Sep 2023	Challenger	Tulln, Austria	Clay	(Germany) Kai Wehnelt	(Czech Republic) Zdeněk Kolář (Slovenia) Blaž Rola	4–6, 6–4, [6–10]
Loss	19–13	Sep 2023	Challenger	Sibiu, Romania	Clay	(Germany) Kai Wehnelt	(Czech Republic) Andrew Paulson (Czech Republic) Michael Vrbenský	2–6, 2–6
Loss	19–14	Oct 2023	Challenger	Shenzhen, Romania	Hard	(Australia) Matthew Romios	(Austria) Alexander Erler (Austria) Lucas Miedler	3–6, 4–6
Win	20–14	Jan 2024	Challenger	Oeiras, Portugal	Hard	(Poland) Karol Drzewiecki	(India) Arjun Kadhe (United Kingdom) Marcus Willis	6–3, 6–4
Loss	20–15	Jan 2024	Challenger	Tenerife, Spain	Hard	(Poland) Karol Drzewiecki	(United States) Vasil Kirkov (Venezuela) Luis David Martínez	6–3, 4–6, [3–10]
Win	21–15	Mar 2024	Challenger	New Delhi, India	Hard	(Australia) Matthew Christopher Romios	(Germany) Jakob Schnaitter (Germany) Mark Wallner	6–4, 6–4
Loss	21–16	Apr 2024	Challenger	Cuernavaca, Mexico	Hard	(Australia) Matthew Christopher Romios	(India) Arjun Kadhe (India) Jeevan Nedunchezhiyan	6–7^{(5–7)}, 4–6
Loss	21–17	Jul 2024	Challenger	Brașov, Romania	Clay	(Poland) Karol Drzewiecki	(Spain) Javier Barranco Cosano (United States) Nicolas Moreno de Alboran	6–3, 1–6, [15–17]
Loss	21–18	Jul 2024	Challenger	Iași, Romania	Clay	(Poland) Karol Drzewiecki	(Romania) Cezar Crețu (Romania) Bogdan Pavel	6–2, 2–6, [4–10]
Win	22–18	Aug 2024	Challenger	Porto, Portugal	Clay	(Israel) Daniel Cukierman	(Monaco) Romain Arneodo (France) Théo Arribagé	6–4, 6–0
Loss	22–19	Sep 2024	Challenger	Tulln, Austria	Clay	(Poland) Karol Drzewiecki	(Slovakia) Miloš Karol (Ukraine) Vitaliy Sachko	4–6, 6–2, [9–11]
Loss	22–20	Oct 2024	Challenger	Valencia, Spain	Clay	(Poland) Karol Drzewiecki	(Peru) Alexander Merino (Germany) Christoph Negritu	3–6, 4–6
Loss	22–21	Oct 2024	Challenger	Curitiba, Brazil	Clay	(Poland) Karol Drzewiecki	(Brazil) Fernando Romboli (Chile) Matías Soto	6–7 ^{(5–7)}, 6–7 ^{(4–7)}
Win	23–21	Oct 2024	Challenger	Guayaquil, Ecuador	Clay	(Poland) Karol Drzewiecki	(Brazil) Luís Britto (Brazil) Marcelo Zormann	6–4, 7–6 ^{(7–2)}
Win	24–21	Nov 2024	Challenger	Lima II, Peru	Clay	(Poland) Karol Drzewiecki	(Brazil) Luís Britto (Brazil) Gustavo Heide	7–5, 6–4
Win	25–21	Nov 2024	Challenger	Montemar, Spain	Clay	(Poland) Karol Drzewiecki	(Spain) Daniel Rincón (Jordan) Abdullah Shelbayh	6–3, 6–4
Loss	25–22	Feb 2025	Challenger	Lille, France	Hard (i)	(Poland) Karol Drzewiecki	(Switzerland) Jakub Paul (Netherlands) David Pel	3–6, 4–6
Win	26–22	Mar 2025	Challenger	Córdoba, Argentina	Clay	(Poland) Karol Drzewiecki	(Brazil) Fernando Romboli (Chile) Matías Soto	6–4, 6–4
Win	27–22	Apr 2025	Challenger	Oeiras, Portugal	Clay	(Poland) Karol Drzewiecki	(Portugal) Francisco Cabral (Austria) Lucas Miedler	6–4, 3–6, [10–8]
Loss	27–23	Mar 2026	Challenger	Murcia, Spain	Clay	(Poland) Karol Drzewiecki	(Lebanon) Benjamin Hassan (Austria) Sebastian Ofner	3–6, 4–6
Loss	27–24	Apr 2026	Challenger	Ostrava, Czech Republic	Clay	(Poland) Karol Drzewiecki	(Spain) Sergio Martos Gornés (Poland) Szymon Walków	7–6^{(7–3)}, 5–7, [8–10]
Win	28–24	May 2026	World Tennis Tour	M25 Santa Margherita di Pula, Italy	Clay	(Poland) Jan Werbliński	(Italy) Alessandro Spadola (Italy) Matteo Vavassori	6–4, 6–3
Win	29–24	Jun 2026	Challenger	Bratislava, Slovakia	Clay	(Poland) Karol Drzewiecki	(Slovakia) Lukáš Pokorný (Ukraine) Vitaliy Sachko	6–4, 7–5
Loss	29–25	Jun 2026	Challenger	Poznań, Poland	Clay	(Poland) Karol Drzewiecki	(Spain) Sergio Martos Gornés (Poland) Szymon Walków	3–6, 5–7
Win	30–25	Aug 2026	World Tennis Tour	M25 Poznań, Poland	Clay	(Poland) Jan Werbliński	(Argentina) Valentín Basel (Argentina) Franco Ribero	6–4, 1–6, [10–8]
Loss	30–26	Aug 2026	Challenger	Como, Italy	Clay	(Poland) Karol Drzewiecki	(Croatia) Admir Kalender (Croatia) Nino Serdarušić	3–6, 4–6
Loss	30–27	Oct 2026	Challenger	Lisbon, Portugal	Clay	(Poland) Karol Drzewiecki	(Portugal) Tiago Pereira (Spain) Benjamín Winter López	6–4, 3–6, [5–10]
Loss	30–28	Oct 2026	Challenger	Guayaquil, Ecuador	Clay	(Poland) Karol Drzewiecki	(Ecuador) Diego Hidalgo (Argentina) Mariano Kestelboim	5–7, 7–6^{(7–4)}, [7–10]
Loss	30–29	Nov 2026	Challenger	Lima, Peru	Clay	(Poland) Karol Drzewiecki	(Argentina) Facundo Bagnis (Argentina) Facundo Mena	6–4, 4–6, [3–10]
