= Alexander Shevchenko (tennis) =

Kazakhstani tennis player (born 2000)

Aleksandr Shevchenko
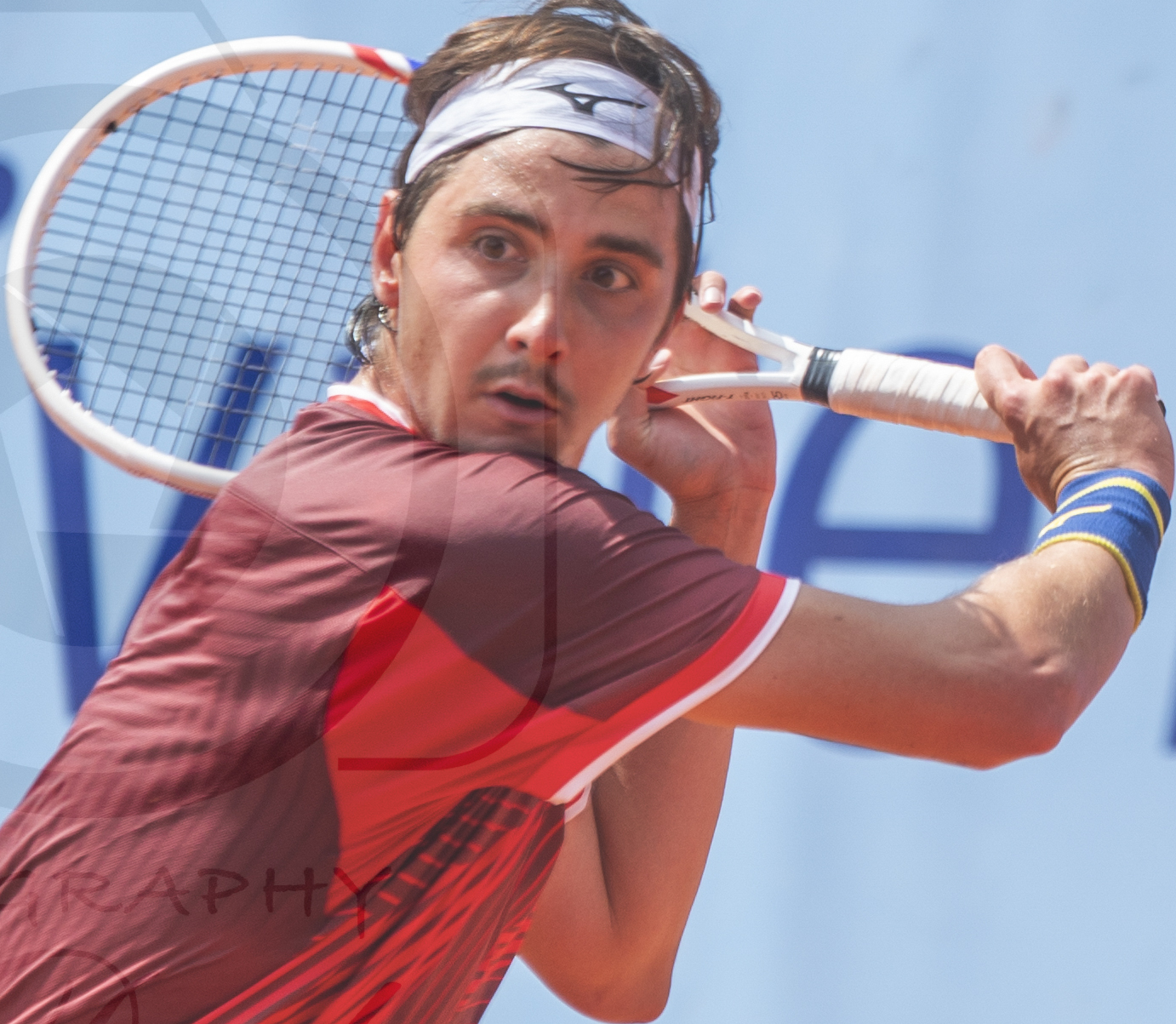
- Aleksandr Shevchenko at the 2026 Swiss Open Gstaad
- Country (sports): Kazakhstan (2024–); Russia (2018–2024)
- Born: 29 November 2000 (age 25) Rostov-on-Don, Russia
- Height: 1.88 m (6 ft 2 in)
- Turned pro: 2018
- Plays: Right-handed (two handed-backhand)
- Coach: Ernests Gulbis (Nov 2026-), Aleksandr Chermoshentsev, Günter Bresnik (−2023)
- Prize money: US$4,341,585

Singles
- Career record: 62–82
- Career titles: 0
- Highest ranking: No. 45 (19 February 2024)
- Current ranking: No. 100 (16 November 2026)

Grand Slam singles results
- Australian Open: 2R (2026)
- French Open: 2R (2023, 2024, 2025)
- Wimbledon: 1R (2023, 2024, 2025, 2026)
- US Open: 2R (2024)

Other tournaments
- Olympic Games: 1R (2024)

Doubles
- Career record: 5–16
- Career titles: 0
- Highest ranking: No. 406 (20 February 2023)

Grand Slam doubles results
- Australian Open: 1R (2025, 2026)
- French Open: 2R (2024)
- Wimbledon: 1R (2024)
- US Open: 1R (2024)
- Last updated on: 30 November 2026.

Aleksandr Aleksandrovich Shevchenko (Russian: Алекса́ндр Алекса́ндрович Шевче́нко; Russian pronunciation: [ɐlʲɪˈksandr ʂɨfˈtɕenkə]; born 29 November 2000) is a Kazakhstani professional tennis player. He has a career-high ATP singles ranking of world No. 45, achieved on 19 February 2024 and a doubles ranking of No. 406, achieved on 20 February 2023. He is currently the No. 2 Kazakhstani player.

== Career ==
=== 2022: Challenger title, ATP Tour & top 150 debuts ===
Ranked No. 234 he reached a back to back quarterfinal at the 2022 Poznań Open in June. Next he won his maiden Challenger at the 2022 Bratislava Open.

Shevchenko made his ATP debut at the 2022 Generali Open Kitzbühel as a lucky loser where he lost to Dominic Thiem. He qualified into the main draw at the ATP 500 2022 Astana Open. He made his top 150 debut on 26 September 2022.

=== 2023–24: Major & Masters debuts, ATP final & Top 10 win, top 50 ===
In February, he qualified at the ATP 500 in Dubai as a lucky loser. As a result, he reached a new career high of No. 113 on 6 February 2023. In March, he reached his second Challenger final of the season as a qualifier in Phoenix, Arizona defeating Gaël Monfils, sixth seed Marc-Andrea Hüsler, top seed Matteo Berrettini and Quentin Halys before losing to Nuno Borges in the final. As a result, he moved to a new career high, one position shy of the top 100 on 20 March 2023. Following another final showing and a title at the Madrid Challenger he reached the top 100 at No. 98 on 17 April 2023.

Ranked No. 96, he qualified for his first Masters 1000 at the Madrid Open and defeated J. J. Wolf in the first round. Next he defeated 31st seed Jiří Lehečka to reach the third round for the first time in his career. He then lost to second seed and compatriot Daniil Medvedev in the third round. He entered the next Masters 1000, the Italian Open on his debut, as a lucky loser directly into the second round of the main draw replacing 29th seed Tallon Griekspoor after his late withdrawal. He won his second round match defeating Sebastián Báez.

He made his Grand Slam debut at the 2023 French Open and defeated Oscar Otte for the first major win in his career. He also made his debut ate Wimbledon, at the Cincinnati Open as a qualifier, and at the US Open.

He received a wildcard for the 2023 Astana Open where he defeated Botic van de Zandschulp in straight sets but lost to eventual semifinalist wildcard Hamad Medjedovic. At the Swiss Indoors, he reached the quarterfinals as a qualifier, defeating home favorite Stan Wawrinka, and then fifth seed Taylor Fritz, his biggest and first top 10 win, saving 15 break and two match points in a close to 3 hours match with three tiebreaks. He lost to defending champion Félix Auger-Aliassime in three sets with two tiebreaks. As a result, he moved 20 positions up into the top 65 in the rankings on 30 October 2023. At the next indoors tournament in Metz he reached his first ATP semifinal, defeating top 15 player, third seed and compatriot Karen Khachanov, his second top-20 career win and of the season. He reached his first final defeating wildcard Pierre-Hugues Herbert and became the youngest Metz finalist since Lucas Pouille aged 22, in 2016. As a result, he moved into the top 50. He lost in the final to Ugo Humbert.

=== 2025–26: Masters third round, Three ATP quarterfinals ===
In November 2026, Schevchenko hired a new coach, former professional player and world No. 10 Ernest Gulbis. Following the team change, he reached his third quarterfinal of the season, as a qualifier, at the 2026 Stockholm Open defeating defending champion Casper Ruud. It was his second top-20 victory of the season, following his win over Ben Shelton at the 2026 Miami Open. As a result he returned to the top 100 in the singles rankings on 16 November 2026.

== Nationality change ==
In January 2024, Shevchenko changed his citizenship from that of his home country of Russia to Kazakhstan effective starting at the tournament in Montpellier. Shevchenko has lived in Vienna since age nine.

== Personal life ==
From the end of 2022, he was in a relationship with fellow tennis player Anastasia Potapova of Russia. On 24 September 2023 they announced their engagement. They got married on 1 December 2023. It was reported that as of 20 September 2024, following the US Open, the couple had divorced after less than a year of marriage.

== Performance timeline ==
Key
W	F	SF	QF	#R	RR	Q#	DNQ	A	NH

(W) winner; (F) finalist; (SF) semifinalist; (QF) quarterfinalist; (#R) rounds 4, 3, 2, 1; (RR) round-robin stage; (Q#) qualification round; (DNQ) did not qualify; (A) absent; (NH) not held; (SR) strike rate (events won / competed); (W–L) win–loss record.
To avoid confusion and double counting, these charts are updated at the conclusion of a tournament or when the player's participation has ended.

=== Singles ===
Current through the 2026 ATP Tour.

Tournament	2022	2023	2024	2025	2026	SR	W–L	Win %
Grand Slam tournaments
Australian Open	A	Q1	1R	1R	2R	0 / 3	1–3	25%
French Open	A	2R	2R	2R	1R	0 / 4	3–4	43%
Wimbledon	A	1R	1R	1R	1R	0 / 4	0–4	0%
US Open	Q1	1R	2R	1R	1R	0 / 4	1–4	25%
Win–loss	0–0	1–3	2–4	1–4	1–4	0 / 15	5–15	25%
National representation
Summer Olympics	NH		1R	NH		0 / 1	0–1	0%
ATP Tour Masters 1000
Indian Wells Masters	A	Q1	2R	1R	2R	0 / 3	2–3	40%
Miami Open	A	Q1	2R	Q2	3R	0 / 2	3–2	60%
Monte-Carlo Masters	A	A	Q1	A	1R	0 / 1	0–1	0%
Madrid Open	A	3R	2R	Q1	1R	0 / 3	3–3	50%
Italian Open	A	3R	2R	1R	2R	0 / 4	3–4	43%
Canadian Open	A	A	A	A		0 / 0	0–0	–
Cincinnati Open	A	1R	Q1	Q2	1R	0 / 2	0–2	0%
Shanghai Masters	NH	1R	3R	1R	Q1	0 / 3	2–3	40%
Paris Masters	A	A	Q1	A		0 / 0	0–0	–
Win–loss	0–0	3-4	6–5	0–3	4–6	0 / 18	13–18	42%
Career statistics
	2022	2023	2024	2025	2026	Career		
Tournaments	3	17	27	18	17	total: 82		
Titles	0	0	0	0		total: 0		
Finals	0	1	0	0		total: 1		
Overall win–loss	0–3	16–17	21–28	14–19	14–19	0 / 82	65–86	43%
Win (%)	0%	48%	43%	42%	42%	43%		
Year-end ranking	154	48	78	97	102	$4,341,585		

== ATP Tour finals ==
=== Singles: 1 (1 runner-up) ===
Legend Grand Slam (0–0) ATP Masters 1000 (0–0) ATP 500 (0–0) ATP 250 (0–1)	Finals by surface Hard (0–1) Clay (0–0) Grass (0–0)	Finals by setting Outdoor (0–0) Indoor (0–1)

Result	W–L	Date	Tournament	Tier	Surface	Opponent	Score
Loss	0–1	Nov 2023	Moselle Open, France	ATP 250	Hard (i)	(France) Ugo Humbert	3–6, 3–6

== ATP Challenger Tour finals ==
=== Singles: 6 (3 titles, 3 runner-ups) ===
Legend ATP Challenger Tour (3–3)	Finals by surface Hard (1–2) Clay (2–1)

Result	W–L	Date	Tournament	Tier	Surface	Opponent	Score
Win	1–0	Jun 2022	Bratislava, Slovakia	Challenger	Clay	(Italy) Riccardo Bonadio	6–3, 7–5
Win	2–0	Jan 2023	Tenerife, Spain	Challenger	Hard	(Austria) Sebastian Ofner	7–5, 6–2
Loss	2–1	Mar 2023	Phoenix, US	Challenger 175	Hard	(Portugal) Nuno Borges	6–4, 2–6, 1–6
Win	3–1	Apr 2023	Madrid, Spain	Challenger	Clay	(Argentina) Pedro Cachín	6–4, 6–3
Loss	3–2	Aug 2025	Sumter, US	Challenger 125	Hard	(Italy) Mattia Bellucci	6–7^{(5–7)}, 1–3 ret.
Loss	3–3	Jun 2026	Bratislava, Slovakia	Challenger	Clay	(Japan) Taro Daniel	6–3, 0–6, 6–7^{(2–7)}

== ITF World Tennis Tour finals ==
=== Singles: 8 (4 titles, 4 runner-ups) ===
Legend ITF WTT (4–4)	Finals by surface Hard (1–0) Clay (3–4)

Result	W–L	Date	Tournament	Tier	Surface	Opponent	Score
Loss	0–1	Nov 2019	M15 Antalya, Turkey	WTT	Clay	(Romania) Alexandru Jecan	6–1, 4–6, 2–6
Win	1–1	Sep 2020	M15 Monastir, Tunisia	WTT	Clay	(Austria) David Pichler	6–3, 6–4
Loss	1–2	Sep 2020	M15 Monastir, Tunisia	WTT	Clay	(Italy) Luca Potenza	6–2, 4–6, 3–6
Loss	1–3	Jan 2021	M15 Antalya, Turkey	WTT	Clay	(Bulgaria) Adrian Andreev	1–6, 6–7^{(1–7)}
Win	2–3	May 2021	M15 Tbilisi, Georgia	WTT	Hard	(Italy) Alessandro Bega	4–6, 7–6^{(7–5)}, 6–3
Loss	2–4	May 2021	M15 Shymkent, Kazakhstan	WTT	Clay	(Italy) Edoardo Lavagno	3–6, 0–6
Win	3–4	Jul 2021	M25 Velenje, Slovenia	WTT	Clay	(Czech Republic) Patrik Rikl	6–1, 6–2
Win	4–4	Feb 2022	M25 Antalya, Turkey	WTT	Clay	(Uruguay) Martín Cuevas	6–2, 6–1

=== Doubles: 5 (2 titles, 3 runner-ups) ===
Legend ITF WTT (2–3)	Finals by surface Hard (0–0) Clay (2–3)

Result	W–L	Date	Tournament	Tier	Surface	Partner	Opponents	Score
Win	1–0	Apr 2019	M15 Antalya, Turkey	WTT	Clay	(Russia) Maxim Ratniuk	(Germany) Luca Gelhardt (United States) Neel Rajesh	6–4, 6–3
Win	2–0	Aug 2019	M15 Moscow, Russia	WTT	Clay	(Russia) Maxim Ratniuk	(Russia) Timur Kiyamov (Russia) Anton Chekhov	0–6, 7–6^{(7–3)}, [10–6]
Loss	2–1	Oct 2019	M15 Antalya, Turkey	WTT	Clay	(Russia) Alexander Ovcharov	(Sweden) Jonathan Mridha (Sweden) Gustav Hansson	3–6, 4–6
Loss	2–2	Jan 2020	M15 Cairo, Egypt	WTT	Clay	(Ukraine) Eric Vanshelboim	(Argentina) Fermín Tenti (Argentina) Juan Pablo Paz	0–6, 1–6
Loss	2–3	Jul 2021	M25 Kottingbrunn, Austria	WTT	Clay	(Czech Republic) David Poljak	(Latvia) Mārtiņš Podžus (Greece) Petros Tsitsipas	3–6, 3–6

== Wins over top 10 players ==
- Shevchenko has a 3–11 record against players who were, at the time the match was played, ranked in the top 10.

Season	2023	2024	2025	2026	Total
Wins	1	1	0	1	3

#	Player	Rk	Event	Surface	Rd	Score	ASR
2023
1.	(United States) Taylor Fritz	9	Swiss Indoors, Switzerland	Hard (i)	2R	6–7^{(7–9)}, 7–6^{(8–6)}, 7–6^{(7–5)}	83
2024
2.	(Denmark) Holger Rune	7	Rotterdam Open, Netherlands	Hard (i)	2R	6–4, 1–6, 6–3	57
2026
3.	(United States) Ben Shelton	9	Miami Open, United States	Hard	2R	6–7^{(3–7)}, 7–6^{(7–3)}, 6–3	84
