= Bratislava Open =

Professional tennis tournament in Slovakia

- 2026 Bratislava Open

ATP Challenger Tour
- Event name: Bratislava Open
- Location: Bratislava, Slovakia
- Venue: TK Slovan Bratislava
- Category: ATP Challenger Tour 100 (2023-)
- Surface: Clay
- Website: website

The Bratislava Open is a professional tennis tournament played on clay courts. The tournament is part of the ATP Challenger Tour. It is held in Bratislava, Slovakia, since 2019. The tournament replaced the Poprad-Tatry Challenger.

== Past finals ==
=== Singles ===
Year	Champion	Runner-up	Score
2026	(Japan) Taro Daniel	(Kazakhstan) Alexander Shevchenko	3–6, 6–0, 7–6^{(7–2)}
2025	(Croatia) Dino Prižmić	(France) Valentin Royer	6–4, 7–6^{(8–6)}
2024	(Poland) Kamil Majchrzak	(Portugal) Henrique Rocha	6–0, 2–6, 6–3
2023	(Ukraine) Vitaliy Sachko	(Bulgaria) Dimitar Kuzmanov	2–6, 6–2, 7–6^{(7–2)}
2022	Alexander Shevchenko	(Italy) Riccardo Bonadio	6–3, 7–5
2021	(Netherlands) Tallon Griekspoor	(Argentina) Sebastián Báez	7–6^{(8–6)}, 6–3
2020	Not held		
2019	(Slovakia) Norbert Gombos	(Hungary) Attila Balázs	6–3, 3–6, 6–2

=== Doubles ===
Year	Champions	Runners-up	Score
2026	(Poland) Karol Drzewiecki (Poland) Piotr Matuszewski	(Slovakia) Lukáš Pokorný (Ukraine) Vitaliy Sachko	6–4, 7–5
2025	(Czech Republic) Andrew Paulson (Czech Republic) Matěj Vocel	(Czech Republic) Jiří Barnat (Czech Republic) Filip Duda	6–1, 6–4
2024	(Germany) Jakob Schnaitter (Germany) Mark Wallner	(Slovakia) Miloš Karol (Slovakia) Tomáš Lánik	6–4, 6–4
2023	(Uruguay) Ariel Behar (Czech Republic) Adam Pavlásek	(Austria) Neil Oberleitner (Germany) Tim Sandkaulen	6–4, 6–4
2022	(India) Sriram Balaji (India) Jeevan Nedunchezhiyan	(Ukraine) Vladyslav Manafov (Ukraine) Oleg Prihodko	7–6^{(8–6)}, 6–4
2021	(Ukraine) Denys Molchanov (Kazakhstan) Aleksandr Nedovyesov	(Netherlands) Sander Arends (Venezuela) Luis David Martínez	7–6^{(7–5)}, 6–1
2020	Not held		
2019	(Belgium) Sander Gillé (Belgium) Joran Vliegen	(Slovakia) Lukáš Klein (Slovakia) Alex Molčan	6–2, 7–5
