= Vitaliy Sachko =

Ukrainian tennis player (born 1997)

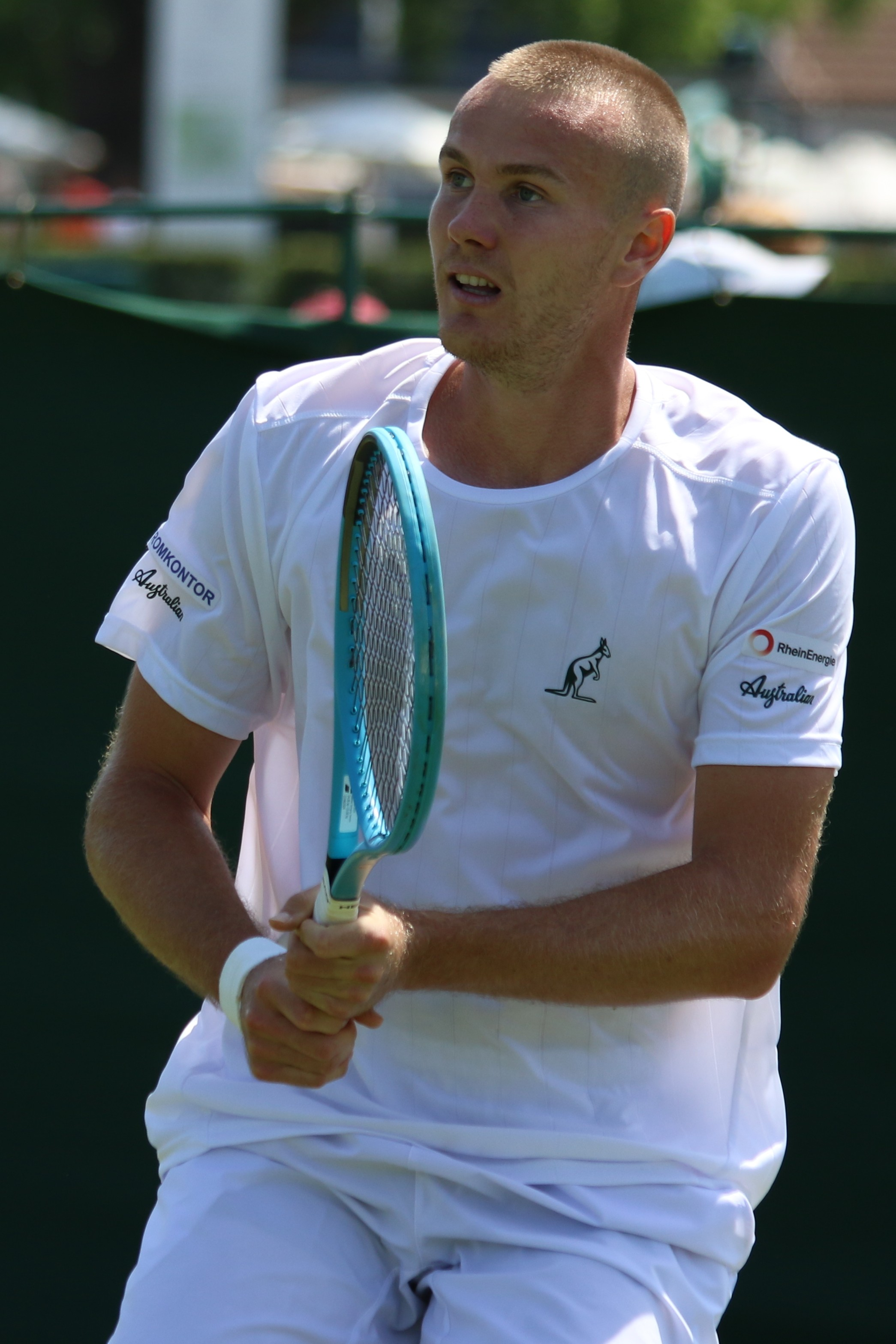
- Sachko at the 2026 Wimbledon Championships
- Native name: Віталій Сачко
- Country (sports): Ukraine
- Residence: Prostějov, Czech Republic
- Born: 14 July 1997 (age 29) Kremenchuk, Ukraine
- Height: 1.88 m (6 ft 2 in)
- Turned pro: 2013
- Plays: Right-handed (two-handed backhand)
- Prize money: US $1,077,558

Singles
- Career record: 3–10
- Career titles: 1 Challenger
- Highest ranking: No. 156 (31 July 2023)
- Current ranking: No. 248 (16 November 2026)

Grand Slam singles results
- Australian Open: Q2 (2022, 2024, 2026)
- French Open: Q2 (2026)
- Wimbledon: Q1 (2022, 2024, 2025, 2026)
- US Open: Q2 (2026)

Doubles
- Career record: 0–0
- Career titles: 9 Challengers
- Highest ranking: No. 122 (28 July 2025)
- Current ranking: No. 255 (16 November 2026)
- Last updated on: 15 November 2026.

Vitaliy Sachko (Ukrainian: Віталій Дмитрович Сачко; born 14 July 1997) is a Ukrainian professional tennis player. He has a career-high singles ranking of world No. 156 achieved on 31 July 2023 and a doubles ranking of No. 122 achieved on 28 July 2025. He is currently the No. 1 player from Ukraine.

== Professional career ==
=== 2020: ATP debut ===
He made his ATP main draw debut at the 2020 Erste Bank Open in the singles draw as lucky loser, where he was defeated by Dominic Thiem, 4–6, 5–7.

=== 2021: Challenger Tour success, Top 250 debut ===
In March, ranked No. 389 in the world, he made it to the final of the Challenger Tour event in Lugano, Switzerland, where he lost to Dominic Stephan Stricker. In July, he made another Challenger final in Perugia, Italy losing to Tomas Martin Etcheverry in singles. At the same tournament, he took his revenge, winning his third Challenger doubles title for 2021 by defeating the Argentinian pair Tomas Etcheverry/Renzo Olivo, partnering Dominic Stricker. As a result, he reached a career-high ranking of No. 269 in singles and No. 220 in doubles on 12 July 2021.

=== 2022-2024: First Challenger title, top 200 ===
Ranked No. 265, in July, he qualified for his second ATP singles main draw at the 2022 Generali Open Kitzbühel as a lucky loser where he lost to Dusan Lajovic.

Ranked No. 286, in May, he qualified for the 2023 Geneva Open but lost to Bernabe Zapata Miralles. He won his first singles Challenger at the 2023 Bratislava Open defeating Dimitar Kuzmanov. As a result he moved close to 80 positions into the top 200 at world No. 187 on 19 June 2023. Ranked No. 166, he also qualified for the 2023 Sofia Open but lost to Sebastian Ofner.

=== 2025: First ATP wins and semifinal ===
At the 2025 Moselle Open, as a lucky loser, he recorded his first match wins at the tour-level to reach his first ATP Tour quarterfinal, defeating third seed Alexander Bublik in the round of 16. As a result he moved back up 36 spots to world No. 186 in the ATP singles rankings and became the first Ukrainian to reach a tour-level quarterfinal since Sergiy Stakhovsky in 2019 Marseille, who also reached the last eight as a lucky loser. Sashko reached his first ATP semifinal getting his revenge over qualifier Clément Tabur, having previously lost to him in the last qualifying round.

== ATP Challenger Tour finals ==
=== Singles: 6 (1 title, 5 runner-ups) ===
Legend ATP Challenger Tour (1–5)	Finals by surface Hard (0–1) Clay (1–4)

Result	W–L	Date	Tournament	Tier	Surface	Opponent	Score
Loss	0–1	Mar 2021	Challenger Città di Lugano, Switzerland	Challenger	Hard (i)	(Switzerland) Dominic Stricker	4–6, 2–6
Loss	0–2	Jul 2021	Internazionali Città di Perugia, Italy	Challenger	Clay	(Argentina) Tomás Martín Etcheverry	5–7, 2–6
Win	1–2	Jun 2023	Bratislava Open, Slovakia	Challenger	Clay	(Bulgaria) Dimitar Kuzmanov	2–6, 6–2, 7–6^{(7–2)}
Loss	1–3	Jul 2023	Internazionali Città di Verona, Italy	Challenger	Clay	(Czech Republic) Vít Kopřiva	6–1, 6–7^{(3–7)}, 2–6
Loss	1–4	Apr 2025	Open Città della Disfida, Italy	Challenger	Clay	(Czech Republic) Dalibor Svrčina	5–7, 3–6
Loss	1–5	Apr 2025	Atkinsons Monza Open, Italy	Challenger	Clay	(Belgium) Raphaël Collignon	3–6, 5–7

=== Doubles: 16 (10 titles, 6 runner-ups) ===
Legend ATP Challenger Tour (10–6)	Finals by surface Hard (5–2) Clay (5–4)

Result	W–L	Date	Tournament	Tier	Surface	Partner	Opponents	Score
Loss	0–1	Nov 2020	Lima Challenger, Peru	Challenger	Hard	(United States) Collin Altamirano	(Spain) Íñigo Cervantes (Spain) Oriol Roca Batalla	3–6, 4–6
Win	1–1	Jun 2021	Almaty Challenger, Kazakhstan	Challenger	Clay	(Netherlands) Jesper de Jong	(Ukraine) Vladyslav Manafov (Russia) Evgenii Tiurnev	7–6^{(7–4)}, 6–1
Win	2–1	Jun 2021	Almaty Challenger II, Kazakhstan	Challenger	Clay	(Ukraine) Vladyslav Manafov	(France) Corentin Denolly (Spain) Adrián Menéndez Maceiras	6–1, 6–4
Win	3–1	Jul 2021	Internazionali Città di Perugia, Italy	Challenger	Clay	(Switzerland) Dominic Stricker	(Argentina) Tomás Martín Etcheverry (Argentina) Renzo Olivo	6–3, 5–7, [10–8]
Loss	3–2	Dec 2021	Città di Forlì II, Italy	Challenger	Hard (i)	(Czech Republic) Lukáš Rosol	(Croatia) Antonio Šančić (Austria) Tristan-Samuel Weissborn	6-7^{(4-7)}, 6-4, [7-10]
Win	4–2	Feb 2022	Città di Forlì V, Italy	Challenger	Hard (i)	(Italy) Marco Bortolotti	(Romania) Victor Vlad Cornea (Germany) Fabian Fallert	7–6^{(7–5)}, 3–6, [10–5]
Win	5–2	Sep 2023	Szczecin Open, Poland	Challenger	Clay	(Czech Republic) Andrew Paulson	(Czech Republic) Zdeněk Kolář (Spain) Sergio Martos Gornés	6–1, 7–6 ^{(8–6)}
Win	6–2	Sep 2024	NÖ Open, Austria	Challenger	Clay	(Slovakia) Miloš Karol	(Poland) Piotr Matuszewski (Poland) Karol Drzewiecki	6–4, 2–6, [11–9]
Win	7–2	Oct 2024	Olbia Challenger, Italy	Challenger	Hard	(Ukraine) Oleksii Krutykh	(Spain) Íñigo Cervantes (Austria) David Pichler	4–6, 6–1, [10–5]
Win	8–2	Feb 2025	Bahrain Challenger, Bahrain	Challenger	Hard	(Kazakhstan) Beibit Zhukayev	Ivan Liutarevich (France) Luca Sanchez	6–4, 6–0
Win	9–2	Mar 2025	Challenger La Manche, France	Challenger	Hard (i)	(Ukraine) Oleg Prihodko	(Slovakia) Lukáš Pokorný (Italy) Giorgio Ricca	6–2, 6–2
Loss	9–3	Jul 2025	San Marino Open, San Marino	Challenger	Clay	(Slovakia) Miloš Karol	(Poland) Karol Drzewiecki (Chinese Taipei) Ray Ho	5–7, 6–7^{(3–7)}
Loss	9–4	Sep 2025	NÖ Open, Austria	Challenger	Clay	(Ukraine) Oleg Prihodko	(Austria) Neil Oberleitner (Austria) Joel Schwärzler	7–5, 3–6, [7–10]
Win	10–4	Feb 2026	Lugano Challenger, Switzerland	Challenger	Hard (i)	(Serbia) Stefan Latinović	(Bosnia and Herzegovina) Mirza Bašić (Bosnia and Herzegovina) Nerman Fatić	6–3, 6–4
Loss	10–5	Mar 2026	Open Città della Disfida, Italy	Challenger	Clay	(Slovakia) Miloš Karol	(Czech Republic) Filip Duda (Serbia) Stefan Latinović	6–7^{(4–7)}, 7–6^{(8–6)}, [11–13]
Loss	10–6	May 2026	Bratislava Open, Slovakia	Challenger	Clay	(Slovakia) Lukáš Pokorný	(Poland) Karol Drzewiecki (Poland) Piotr Matuszewski	4–6, 5–7

== ITF Futures/World Tennis Tour finals ==
=== Singles: 4 (2 titles, 2 runner-ups) ===
Legend ITF WTT (2–2)	Finals by surface Hard (1–1) Clay (1–1)

Result	W–L	Date	Tournament	Tier	Surface	Opponent	Score
Win	1–0	Sep 2019	M15 Chornomorsk, Ukraine	WTT	Clay	(Italy) Marco Bortolotti	7–5, 4–6, 6–1
Loss	1–1	Dec 2019	M15 Heraklion, Greece	WTT	Hard	(Austria) David Pichler	1–6, ret.
Win	2–1	Mar 2021	M15 Bratislava, Slovakia	WTT	Hard (i)	(France) Jurgen Briand	6–1, 2–6, 7–6^{(7–3)}
Loss	2–2	May 2021	M25 Jablonec nad Nisou, Czech Republic	WTT	Clay	(Czech Republic) Jiří Lehečka	3–6, 2–6

=== Doubles: 13 (5 titles, 8 runner-ups) ===
Legend ITF Futures/WTT (5–8)	Finals by surface Hard (3–4) Clay (2–4)

Result	W–L	Date	Tournament	Tier	Surface	Partner	Opponents	Score
Loss	0–1	Oct 2015	Ukraine F6, Cherkassy	Futures	Clay	(Ukraine) Vitalii Shcherba	(Czech Republic) Libor Salaba (Ukraine) Marat Deviatiarov	4–6, 3–6
Loss	0–2	Apr 2018	Turkey F16, Antalya	Futures	Clay	(Ukraine) Artem Smirnov	(Russia) Alexander Boborykin (Russia) Timur Kiyamov	3–6, 6–4, [8–10]
Loss	0–3	Mar 2019	M15 Sharm El Sheikh, Egypt	WTT	Hard	(Ukraine) Vitalii Shcherba	(Spain) Pablo Vivero González (Spain) Andrés Artuñedo	5–7, 7–5, [9–11]
Win	1–3	Jul 2019	M15 Telfs, Austria	WTT	Clay	(Czech Republic) Michal Konečný	(Czech Republic) Vít Kopřiva (Austria) David Pichler	6–2, 6–3
Win	2–3	Nov 2019	M15 Mishref, Kuwait	WTT	Hard	(Austria) David Pichler	(India) Adil Kalyanpur (Germany) Kai Wehnelt	6–4, 6–1
Loss	2–4	Nov 2019	M15 Mishref, Kuwait	WTT	Hard	(Hungary) Mátyás Füle	(Japan) Soichiro Moritani (Japan) Kento Takeuchi	6–7^{(1–7)}, 4–6
Win	3–4	Nov 2019	M15 Heraklion, Greece	WTT	Hard	(Austria) David Pichler	(Switzerland) Rémy Bertola (Germany) Daniel Masur	7–6^{(7–2)}, 6–4
Loss	3–5	Dec 2019	M15 Heraklion, Greece	WTT	Hard	(Austria) David Pichler	(Greece) Eleftherios Theodorou (Greece) Aristotelis Thanos	walkover
Win	4–5	Sep 2020	M15 Curtea de Argeș, Romania	WTT	Clay	(Poland) Michał Dembek	(Romania) Adrian Barbu (Romania) Stefan Palosi	6–4, 6–3
Win	5–5	Oct 2020	M15 Sharm El Sheikh, Egypt	WTT	Hard	(Ukraine) Vladyslav Manafov	(Ukraine) Yurii Dzhavakian (Latvia) Mārtiņš Podžus	6–3, 6–3
Loss	5–6	Mar 2021	M15 Bratislava, Slovakia	WTT	Hard (i)	(Poland) Michał Dembek	(Poland) Michał Mikuła (Austria) Neil Oberleitner	7–6^{(7–2)}, 3–6, [5–10]
Loss	5–7	May 2021	M25 Jablonec nad Nisou, Czech Republic	WTT	Clay	(Belarus) Uladzimir Ignatik	(Czech Republic) Andrew Paulson (Czech Republic) Patrik Rikl	6–0, 2–6, [7–10]
Loss	5–8	Oct 2024	M25 Trnava, Slovakia	Futures	Hard (i)	(Slovakia) Miloš Karol	(Switzerland) Rémy Bertola (Italy) Filippo Romano	3–6, 3–6

== Record against top 10 players ==
Sachko's record against players who have been ranked in the top 10 (as of 27 October 2020):

Player	Record	Win%	Hard	Clay	Grass	Last Match
No. 3 ranked players						
(Austria) Dominic Thiem	0–1	0%	0–1	0–0	0–0	Lost (4–6, 5–7) at 2020 Vienna
Total	0–1	0%	0–1 (0%)	0–0 ( – )	0–0 ( – )	
