= Lukáš Pokorný (tennis) =

Slovak tennis player (born 2002)

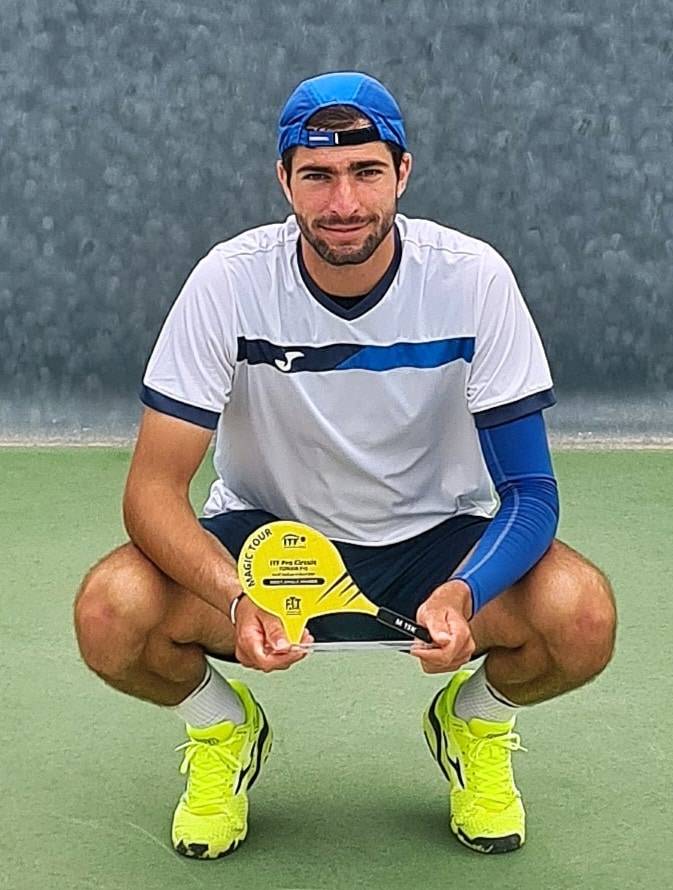
- Pokorný in 2024
- Country (sports): Slovakia
- Born: 28 February 2002 (age 24) Bratislava, Slovakia
- Height: 1.91 m (6 ft 3 in)
- Plays: Right-handed (two-handed backhand)
- Coach: Ladislav Simon, Ľubomír Kurhajec
- Prize money: US $148,431

Singles
- Career record: 1–0
- Career titles: 0 Challenger, 4 ITF
- Highest ranking: No. 383 (9 June 2025)
- Current ranking: No. 558 (19 October 2026)

Doubles
- Career record: 1–0
- Career titles: 0 Challenger, 17 ITF
- Highest ranking: No. 141 (4 August 2025)
- Current ranking: No. 248 (19 October 2026)

Team competitions
- Davis Cup: Singles: 1–0; Doubles: 1–0
- Last updated on: 19 October 2026.

Lukáš Pokorný (born 28 February 2002) is a Slovak professional tennis player. He has a career-high ATP singles ranking of world No. 383 achieved on 9 June 2025 and a doubles ranking of No. 141 achieved on 4 August 2025.

He represents Slovakia at the Davis Cup, where he has a win-loss record of 2–0.

== Early life ==
Pokorný was born in Bratislava, Slovakia. He played for Tennis Club Slávia Agrofert in Bratislava and TK Precheza Přerov in the Czech Extraliga.

== Professional career ==
In November 2020, he made his ATP Challenger Tour debut with a wildcard into the doubles main draw of the Slovak Open with Filip Horanský.

In February 2024, he made his Davis Cup debut in its qualifier against Serbia. He won his singles match after an early retirement by Laslo Djere, allowing Slovakia to advance to the Davis Cup Finals.

In March 2025, he reached his first Challenger doubles final at the Challenger La Manche with Giorgio Ricca, but lost to Oleg Prihodko and Vitaliy Sachko. He was also a runner-up in doubles at the Moldova Open and Czech Open, partnering Ilia Simakin and Dalibor Svrčina, respectively.

In 2026 he reached the final of the 2026 Bratislava Open with Vitaliy Sachko.

== ATP Challenger and ITF Tour finals ==
=== Singles: 11 (4 titles, 7 runner-ups) ===
Legend
ITF World Tennis Tour (4–7)

Titles by surface
Hard (4–6)
Clay (0–1)

Result	W–L	Date	Tournament	Tier	Surface	Opponent	Score
Loss	0–1	Aug 2022	M15 Bad Waltersdorf, Austria	WTT	Clay	(Germany) Timo Stodder	2–6, 3–6
Loss	0–2	Oct 2022	M15 Sharm El Sheikh, Egypt	WTT	Hard	Ilia Simakin	6–7^{(2–7)}, 6–2, 3–6
Loss	0–3	Mar 2023	M15 Sharm El Sheikh, Egypt	WTT	Hard	(United States) Joshua Sheehy	6–7^{(6–8)}, 4–6
Loss	0–4	Aug 2023	M15 Monastir, Tunisia	WTT	Hard	(United States) Garrett Johns	7–6^{(7–3)}, 2–6, 3–6
Loss	0–5	Aug 2023	M15 Monastir, Tunisia	WTT	Hard	(Senegal) Seydina André	6–3, 2–6, 6–7^{(6–8)}
Loss	0–6	Nov 2023	M25 Trnava, Slovakia	WTT	Hard	(Sweden) Karl Friberg	4–6, 4–6
Loss	0–7	Apr 2024	M15 Monastir, Tunisia	WTT	Hard	(United Kingdom) Giles Hussey	6–0, 4–6, 4–6
Win	1–7	Apr 2024	M15 Monastir, Tunisia	WTT	Hard	(United Kingdom) Stuart Parker	7–5, 6–1
Win	2–7	Sep 2024	M15 Trnava, Slovakia	WTT	Hard	(Slovakia) Miloš Karol	7–6^{(7–2)}, 6–2
Win	3–7	Mar 2025	M15 Monastir, Tunisia	WTT	Hard	(Italy) Luca Potenza	5–7, 6–1, 6–1
Win	4–7	Jan 2026	M25 Monastir, Tunisia	WTT	Hard	(Germany) Florian Broska	6–3, 6–4

=== Doubles: 38 (17 titles, 21 runner-ups) ===
Legend
ATP Challenger Tour (0–5)
ITF World Tennis Tour (17–16)

Titles by surface
Hard (12–12)
Clay (5–9)

Result	W–L	Date	Tournament	Tier	Surface	Partner	Opponents	Score
Loss	0–1	Nov 2020	M15 Bratislava, Slovakia	ITF WTT	Hard	(Slovakia) Lukáš Palovič	(Russia) Artem Dubrivnyy (Ukraine) Vadym Ursu	2–6, 0–6
Win	1–1	Jul 2021	M15 Doboj, Bosnia and Herzegovina	ITF WTT	Clay	(Slovakia) Krištof Minárik	(United Kingdom) Felix Gill (Ukraine) Oleksandr Ovcharenko	7–6^{(7–5)}, 6–4
Loss	1–2	Nov 2021	M15 Ostrava, Czech Republic	ITF WTT	Hard	(Slovakia) Miloš Karol	(Czech Republic) Filip Duda (Czech Republic) Adam Pavlásek	4–6, 4–6
Loss	1–3	May 2022	M15 Doboj, Bosnia and Herzegovina	ITF WTT	Clay	(Slovakia) Miloš Karol	(Ukraine) Oleksandr Bielinskyi (Japan) Rimpei Kawakami	6–3, 6–7^{(3–7)}, [6–10]
Win	2–3	May 2022	M25 Osijek, Croatia	ITF WTT	Clay	(India) Dev Javia	(Croatia) Luka Mikrut (Croatia) Mili Poljičak	7–6^{(7–3)}, 3–6, [10–8]
Loss	2–4	Jun 2022	M25 Poprad, Slovakia	ITF WTT	Clay	(Slovakia) Miloš Karol	(Sweden) Simon Freund (Denmark) Johannes Ingildsen	4–6, 2–6
Loss	2–5	July 2022	M15 Metzingen, Germany	ITF WTT	Clay	(United States) Alfredo Perez	(Croatia) Admir Kalender (Croatia) Antonio Šančić	6–7^{(5–7)}, 3–6
Loss	2–6	July 2022	M15 Łódź, Poland	ITF WTT	Clay	(Slovakia) Miloš Karol	(Poland) Szymon Kielan (Czech Republic) Petr Nouza	5–7, 4–6
Win	3–6	Aug 2022	M15 Bad Waltersdorf, Austria	ITF WTT	Clay	(Germany) Timo Stodder	(Slovenia) Jan Dimitrijevič (Slovenia) Maj Premzl	6–4, 6–2
Loss	3–7	Sep 2022	M15 Sharm El Sheikh, Egypt	ITF WTT	Hard	(Georgia (country)) Saba Purtseladze	Aliaksandr Liaonenka; Alexander Zgirovsky	5–7, 4–6
Win	4–7	Oct 2022	M15 Sharm El Sheikh, Egypt	ITF WTT	Hard	(Georgia (country)) Saba Purtseladze	(Slovakia) Peter Benjamin Privara (Poland) Borys Zgoła	6–7^{(2–7)}, 6–3, [10–4]
Win	5–7	Feb 2023	M15 Sharm El Sheikh, Egypt	ITF WTT	Hard	(Georgia (country)) Saba Purtseladze	(Luxembourg) Alex Knaff (Germany) Jakob Schnaitter	6–3, 6–4
Loss	5–8	May 2023	M15 Krško, Slovenia	ITF WTT	Clay	(Slovakia) Tomáš Lánik	(Ecuador) Álvaro Guillén Meza (Argentina) Ignacio Monzón	6–3, 6–7^{(3–7)}, [4–10]
Loss	5–9	May 2023	M15 Brčko, Bosnia and Herzegovina	ITF WTT	Clay	(Austria) David Pichler	(United States) George Goldhoff (Australia) Brandon Walkin	6–7^{(4–7)}, 3–6
Win	6–9	Jul 2023	M25 Marburg, Germany	ITF WTT	Clay	(Germany) Timo Stodder	(Czech Republic) Dominik Reček (Czech Republic) Daniel Siniakov	6–4, 6–1
Win	7–9	Aug 2023	M15 Monastir, Tunisia	ITF WTT	Hard	(Italy) Stefano Reitano	(Mexico) Daniel Moreno (Mexico) Alan Fernando Rubio Fierros	6–3, 6–4
Loss	7–10	Aug 2023	M15 Monastir, Tunisia	ITF WTT	Hard	(South Africa) Kris van Wyk	(United States) Ryan Seggerman (United States) Patrik Trhac	4–6, 5–7
Loss	7–11	Jan 2024	M15 Bressuire, France	ITF WTT	Hard	(Slovakia) Igor Zelenay	(Ivory Coast) Eliakim Coulibaly (Finland) Eero Vasa	4–6, 7–6^{(8–6)}, [8–10]
Win	8–11	Sep 2024	M15 Trnava, Slovakia	ITF WTT	Hard	(Germany) Kai Wehnelt	(Ukraine) Aleksandr Braynin (Czech Republic) Matyáš Černý	6–2, 6–4
Win	9–11	Nov 2024	M15 Monastir, Tunisia	ITF WTT	Hard	Svyatoslav Gulin	(Senegal) Seydina André (France) Luc Fomba	6–3, 6–4
Win	10–11	Nov 2024	M25 Monastir, Tunisia	ITF WTT	Hard	Marat Sharipov	(Turkey) Yankı Erel (Croatia) Admir Kalender	w/o
Loss	10–12	Nov 2024	M25 Monastir, Tunisia	ITF WTT	Hard	(Tunisia) Aziz Ouakaa	(Bulgaria) Alexander Donski (Spain) Bruno Pujol Navarro	6–7^{(4–7)}, 6–4, [5–10]
Loss	10–13	Jan 2025	M25 Glasgow, United Kingdom	ITF WTT	Hard	(Belgium) Romain Faucon	(United Kingdom) Finn Bass (United Kingdom) James Story	2–6, 6–3, [7–10]
Loss	10–14	Mar 2025	Challenger La Manche, France	Challenger	Hard	(Italy) Giorgio Ricca	(Ukraine) Oleg Prihodko (Ukraine) Vitaliy Sachko	2–6, 2–6
Win	11–14	Mar 2025	M15 Monastir, Tunisia	ITF WTT	Hard	(France) Florent Bax	(Czech Republic) Matthew William Donald (Greece) Dimitris Sakellaridis	6–4, 6–4
Win	12–14	Mar 2025	M15 Monastir, Tunisia	ITF WTT	Hard	(Tunisia) Aziz Ouakaa	(Portugal) João Graça (Portugal) Diogo Marques	5–7, 6–3, [10–5]
Loss	12–15	Apr 2025	M15 Monastir, Tunisia	ITF WTT	Hard	(Germany) Robert Strombachs	(Belgium) Buvaysar Gadamauri (Greece) Dimitris Sakellaridis	3–6, 3–6
Win	13–15	May 2025	M25 Tbilisi, Georgia	ITF WTT	Hard	(Georgia (country)) Aleksandre Bakshi	(New Zealand) Ajeet Rai (Japan) Kaichi Uchida	6–2, 6–4
Loss	13–16	May 2025	Moldova Open, Moldova	Challenger	Hard	Ilia Simakin	(Poland) Szymon Kielan (Poland) Filip Pieczonka	4–6, 0–6
Loss	13–17	Jun 2025	Czech Open, Czech Republic	Challenger	Clay	(Czech Republic) Dalibor Svrčina	(Czech Republic) Petr Nouza (Czech Republic) Patrik Rikl	6–4, 3–6, [4–10]
Win	14–17	Aug 2025	M25 Monastir, Tunisia	ITF WTT	Hard	(France) Dan Added	(United States) Sekou Bangoura (Ghana) Isaac Nortey	6–2, 7–5
Win	15–17	Jan 2026	M25 Monastir, Tunisia	ITF WTT	Hard	(United States) Garrett Johns	(Turkey) Mert Alkaya (Sweden) Oliver Johansson	6–7^{(6–8)}, 6–2, [12–10]
Loss	15–18	Jan 2026	M25 Monastir, Tunisia	ITF WTT	Hard	Egor Agafonov	(Luxembourg) Louis Van Herck (Germany) Marlon Vankan	4–6, 7–5, [6–10]
Win	16–18	Apr 2026	M25 Sharm El Sheikh, Egypt	ITF WTT	Hard	(Germany) Niklas Schell	(Cyprus) Eleftherios Neos; Semen Pankin	7–6^{(7–4)}, 6–4
Loss	16–19	Apr 2026	M25 Sharm El Sheikh, Egypt	ITF WTT	Hard	(Germany) Niklas Schell	(New Zealand) Ajeet Rai (Australia) Thomas Fancutt	6–7^{(3–7)}, 1–6
Loss	16–20	May 2026	Košice Open, Slovakia	Challenger	Clay	(Czech Republic) David Poljak	(Slovakia) Miloš Karol (Croatia) Nino Serdarušić	7–5, 6–7^{(4–7)}, [5–10]
Loss	16–21	May 2026	Bratislava Open, Slovakia	Challenger	Clay	(Ukraine) Vitaliy Sachko	(Poland) Karol Drzewiecki (Poland) Piotr Matuszewski	4–6, 5–7
Win	17–21	Sep 2026	M25 Pardubice, Czech Republic	ITF WTT	Clay	(Greece) Petros Tsitsipas	(Czech Republic) Štěpán Baum (Czech Republic) Matyáš Černý	6–3, 7–6^{(7–5)}
