= 2024 Ion Țiriac Challenger – Doubles =

Doubles
- 2024 Ion Țiriac Challenger

Final
- Champions: (Spain) Javier Barranco Cosano (United States) Nicolas Moreno de Alboran
- Runners-up: (Poland) Karol Drzewiecki (Poland) Piotr Matuszewski
- Score: 3–6, 6–1, [17–15]

Events
Singles	Doubles
- Ion Țiriac Challenger

This was the first edition of the tournament.

Javier Barranco Cosano and Nicolas Moreno de Alboran won the title after defeating Karol Drzewiecki and Piotr Matuszewski 3–6, 6–1, [17–15] in the final.

== Seeds ==
1. (Brazil) Orlando Luz / (Brazil) Marcelo Zormann (first round)
2. (Poland) Karol Drzewiecki / (Poland) Piotr Matuszewski (final)
3. (Sweden) Simon Freund / (Denmark) Johannes Ingildsen (semifinals)
4. (Romania) Alexandru Jecan / (Poland) Szymon Walków (semifinals)

== Draw ==
Key

- Q = Qualifier
- WC = Wild card
- LL = Lucky loser
- Alt = Alternate
- ITF = ITF entry
- PR = Protected ranking
- SR = Special ranking
- SE = Special exempt
- JE = Junior exempt
- JR = Junior Accelerator Programme entrant
- CO = College Accelerator Programme entrant
- NG = Next Gen Accelerator Program entrant
- w/o = Walkover
- r = Retired
- d = Defaulted

=== Draw ===
First round
1	(Brazil) O Luz (Brazil) M Zormann	6^{4}	6^{4}
(Spain) J Barranco Cosano (United States) N Moreno de Alboran	7^{7}	7^{7}
4	(Romania) A Jecan (Poland) S Walków	6	6
(Czech Republic) F Duda (Ukraine) V Sachko	3	2
WC	(Romania) Ioan Alexandru Chiriță (Romania) Mihai Alexandru Coman	3	4
3	(Sweden) S Freund (Denmark) J Ingildsen	6	6
Alt	(Czech Republic) H Bartoň (Czech Republic) D Svrčina	3	3
(Turkey) E Kırkın (Kazakhstan) D Popko	6	6

Quarterfinals
(Spain) J Barranco Cosano (United States) N Moreno de Alboran	7^{7}	6
(Israel) R Stepanov (United States) Tennyson Whiting	6^{0}	3
4	(Romania) A Jecan (Poland) S Walków	3	6	[10]
(United Kingdom) S Duncan (United States) H Reese	6	3	[2]
(Bolivia) M Dellien (Argentina) GA Olivieri
3	(Sweden) S Freund (Denmark) J Ingildsen	w/o
(Turkey) E Kırkın (Kazakhstan) D Popko	3	6^{3}
2	(Poland) K Drzewiecki (Poland) P Matuszewski	6	7^{7}

Semifinals
(Spain) J Barranco Cosano (United States) N Moreno de Alboran	6	6
4	(Romania) A Jecan (Poland) S Walków	4	1
3	(Sweden) S Freund (Denmark) J Ingildsen	2	4
2	(Poland) K Drzewiecki (Poland) P Matuszewski	6	6

Final
(Spain) J Barranco Cosano (United States) N Moreno de Alboran	3	6	[17]
2	(Poland) K Drzewiecki (Poland) P Matuszewski	6	1	[15]
