= 2026 Ion Țiriac Challenger – Doubles =

Doubles
- 2026 Ion Țiriac Challenger

Final
- Champions: (Austria) Maximilian Neuchrist (Czech Republic) Michael Vrbenský
- Runners-up: (Spain) Íñigo Cervantes (Ukraine) Denys Molchanov
- Score: 6–3, 3–6, [10–4]

Events
Singles	Doubles
- Ion Țiriac Challenger

Vladyslav Orlov and Santiago Rodríguez Taverna were the defending champions but chose not to defend their title.

Maximilian Neuchrist and Michael Vrbenský won the title after defeating Íñigo Cervantes and Denys Molchanov 6–3, 3–6, [10–4] in the final.

== Seeds ==
1. (Czech Republic) Filip Duda / (Serbia) Stefan Latinović (quarterfinals)
2. (Romania) Alexandru Jecan / (Romania) Bogdan Pavel (quarterfinals)
3. (Sweden) Erik Grevelius / (Czech Republic) David Poljak (semifinals)
4. (Romania) Victor Vlad Cornea / (Israel) Daniel Cukierman (first round)

== Draw ==
Key

- Q = Qualifier
- WC = Wild card
- LL = Lucky loser
- Alt = Alternate
- ITF = ITF entry
- PR = Protected ranking
- SR = Special ranking
- SE = Special exempt
- JE = Junior exempt
- JR = Junior Accelerator Programme entrant
- CO = College Accelerator Programme entrant
- NG = Next Gen Accelerator Program entrant
- w/o = Walkover
- r = Retired
- d = Defaulted

First round
1	(Czech Republic) F Duda (Serbia) S Latinović	6	4	[10]
S Betov; I Simakin	2	6	[6]
(Spain) Í Cervantes (Ukraine) D Molchanov	6	7
PR	(Romania) C Crețu (Australia) J Taylor	2	5
3	(Sweden) E Grevelius (Czech Republic) D Poljak	6	6
WC	(Germany) Dominic Ducariu (Romania) Ștefan Paloși	0	2
(France) S Gueymard Wayenburg (Poland) M Kaśnikowski	1	6^{5}
Alt	(Switzerland) L Castelnuovo (Japan) A Santillan	6	7^{7}
(Serbia) I Sabanov (Serbia) M Sabanov	5	6	[7]
(Austria) M Neuchrist (Czech Republic) M Vrbenský	7	4	[10]
(India) SDP Dev (India) Nitin Kumar Sinha	1	6	[10]
4	(Romania) V Cornea (Israel) D Cukierman	6	4	[8]
(India) VS Prashanth (India) R Ramanathan	7^{8}	6
WC	(Romania) Ștefan Horia Haita (Romania) RD Țurcanu	6^{6}	3
(Serbia) O Milić (France) L Pavlovic	1	6^{5}
2	(Romania) A Jecan (Romania) B Pavel	6	7^{7}

Quarterfinals
1	(Czech Republic) F Duda (Serbia) S Latinović	6^{5}	3
(Spain) Í Cervantes (Ukraine) D Molchanov	7^{7}	6
3	(Sweden) E Grevelius (Czech Republic) D Poljak	6	6
Alt	(Switzerland) L Castelnuovo (Japan) A Santillan	4	3
(Austria) M Neuchrist (Czech Republic) M Vrbenský	6	6
(India) SDP Dev (India) NK Sinha	3	4
(India) VS Prashanth (India) R Ramanathan	6	2	[11]
2	(Romania) A Jecan (Romania) B Pavel	3	6	[9]

Semifinals
(Spain) Í Cervantes (Ukraine) D Molchanov	6	6
3	(Sweden) E Grevelius (Czech Republic) D Poljak	4	4
(Austria) M Neuchrist (Czech Republic) M Vrbenský	7	6
(India) VS Prashanth (India) R Ramanathan	5	4

Final
(Spain) Í Cervantes (Ukraine) D Molchanov	3	6	[4]
(Austria) M Neuchrist (Czech Republic) M Vrbenský	6	3	[10]
