= 2026 Open de Sion – Singles =

Singles
- 2026 Open de Sion

Final
- Champion: (Switzerland) Dominic Stricker
- Runner-up: (Lebanon) Benjamin Hassan
- Score: 6–1, 2–6, 6–2

Events
| Singles | Doubles |
- Open de Sion

This was the first edition of the tournament.

Dominic Stricker won the title after defeating Benjamin Hassan 6–1, 2–6, 6–2 in the final.

== Seeds ==
1. (Italy) Lorenzo Giustino (semifinals, retired)
2. (Argentina) Juan Manuel La Serna (quarterfinals)
3. (Austria) Sandro Kopp (second round)
4. (France) Calvin Hemery (second round)
5. (Germany) Marvin Möller (first round)
6. (Switzerland) Dominic Stricker (champion)
7. (Bolivia) Murkel Dellien (first round)
8. (Argentina) Juan Estévez (first round)

== Draw ==
Key

- Q = Qualifier
- WC = Wild card
- LL = Lucky loser
- Alt = Alternate
- ITF = ITF entry
- PR = Protected ranking
- SR = Special ranking
- SE = Special exempt
- JE = Junior exempt
- JR = Junior Accelerator Programme entrant
- CO = College Accelerator Programme entrant
- NG = Next Gen Accelerator Program entrant
- w/o = Walkover
- r = Retired
- d = Defaulted

=== Finals ===
Semifinals
1 | (Italy) Lorenzo Giustino | 6 | 2^{r}
Q | (Lebanon) Benjamin Hassan | 3 | 3
6/WC | (Switzerland) Dominic Stricker | 6 | 6
(Italy) Tommaso Compagnucci | 2 | 2

Final
Q | (Lebanon) Benjamin Hassan | 1 | 6 | 2
6/WC | (Switzerland) Dominic Stricker | 6 | 2 | 6

=== Top half ===
First round
1 | (Italy) L Giustino | 6 | 6
Q | (Argentina) Thiago Cigarrán | 4 | 3
(Switzerland) J Nikles | 3 | 0
(Switzerland) H Bernet | 6 | 6
Q | (South Korea) G Campaña Lee | 6^{2} | 3
Q | (Spain) Àlex Martí Pujolràs | 7^{7} | 6
(Bulgaria) D Kuzmanov | 6 | 6
5 | (Germany) M Möller | 3 | 4
3 | (Austria) S Kopp | 6 | 6
LL | (Germany) Luca Wiedenmann | 4 | 1
Q | (Lebanon) B Hassan | 7^{7} | 6
Q | (Ukraine) O Ovcharenko | 6^{4} | 3
(Ukraine) G Kravchenko | 4 | 3
WC | (Switzerland) Jeffrey von der Schulenburg | 6 | 6
(France) G Blancaneaux | 6 | 3 | 7
8 | (Argentina) Juan Estévez | 1 | 6 | 5

Second round
1 | (Italy) L Giustino | 6 | 3 | 7^{7}
(Switzerland) H Bernet | 4 | 6 | 6^{3}
Q | (Spain) À Martí Pujolràs | 1 | 6 | 1
(Bulgaria) D Kuzmanov | 6 | 3 | 6
3 | (Austria) S Kopp | 6 | 1 | 4
Q | (Lebanon) B Hassan | 3 | 6 | 6
WC | (Switzerland) J von der Schulenburg | 3 | 4
(France) G Blancaneaux | 6 | 6

Quarterfinals
1 | (Italy) L Giustino | 6 | 5 | 6
(Bulgaria) D Kuzmanov | 3 | 7 | 1
Q | (Lebanon) B Hassan | 7^{7} | 4 | 7^{7}
(France) G Blancaneaux | 6^{4} | 6 | 6^{2}

Semifinals
1 | (Italy) L Giustino | 6 | 2^{r}
Q | (Lebanon) B Hassan | 3 | 3

=== Bottom half ===
First round
6/WC | (Switzerland) D Stricker | 7 | 6
(France) Raphael Perot | 5 | 3
(Serbia) O Milić | 2 | 6 | 5
(Argentina) Lucio Ratti | 6 | 4 | 7
(Switzerland) M Brunold | 7^{7} | 6
(Germany) P Zahraj | 6^{4} | 1
Q | (Germany) K Wehnelt | 2 | 6 | 5
4 | (France) C Hemery | 6 | 3 | 7
7 | (Bolivia) M Dellien | 2 | 1
Alt | (Netherlands) Ryan Nijboer | 6 | 6
(Italy) Tommaso Compagnucci | 7 | 6
CO | (Sweden) M Dahlin | 5 | 3
WC | (Switzerland) Luca Stäheli | 6 | 6
Andrey Chepelev | 3 | 1
(Argentina) F Mena | 3 | 3
2 | (Argentina) JM La Serna | 6 | 6

Second round
6/WC | (Switzerland) D Stricker | 6 | 6
(Argentina) L Ratti | 4 | 4
(Switzerland) M Brunold | 6 | 3 | 6
4 | (France) C Hemery | 3 | 6 | 3
Alt | (Netherlands) R Nijboer | 3 | 2
(Italy) T Compagnucci | 6 | 6
WC | (Switzerland) L Stäheli | 3 | 1^{r}
2 | (Argentina) JM La Serna | 6 | 1

Quarterfinals
6/WC | (Switzerland) D Stricker | 6 | 7^{7}
(Switzerland) M Brunold | 4 | 6^{3}
(Italy) T Compagnucci | 6 | 6^{1} | 6
2 | (Argentina) JM La Serna | 3 | 7^{7} | 4

Semifinals
6/WC | (Switzerland) D Stricker | 6 | 6
(Italy) T Compagnucci | 2 | 2
