= 2025 Ion Țiriac Challenger – Doubles =

Doubles
- 2025 Ion Țiriac Challenger

Final
- Champions: (Ukraine) Vladyslav Orlov (Argentina) Santiago Rodríguez Taverna
- Runners-up: (Romania) Alexandru Jecan (Romania) Bogdan Pavel
- Score: 4–6, 7–6^{(7–5)}, [10–7]

Events
Singles	Doubles
- Ion Țiriac Challenger

Javier Barranco Cosano and Nicolas Moreno de Alboran were the defending champions but chose not to defend their title.

Vladyslav Orlov and Santiago Rodríguez Taverna won the title after defeating Alexandru Jecan and Bogdan Pavel 4–6, 7–6^{(7–5)}, [10–7] in the final.

== Seeds ==
1. (United States) George Goldhoff / (Chile) Matías Soto (first round)
2. (Peru) Alexander Merino / (Germany) Christoph Negritu (semifinals)
3. (France) Luca Sanchez / (Poland) Szymon Walków (first round)
4. (India) Siddhant Banthia / (Bulgaria) Alexander Donski (semifinals)

== Draw ==
Key

- Q = Qualifier
- WC = Wild card
- LL = Lucky loser
- Alt = Alternate
- ITF = ITF entry
- PR = Protected ranking
- SR = Special ranking
- SE = Special exempt
- JE = Junior exempt
- JR = Junior Accelerator Programme entrant
- CO = College Accelerator Programme entrant
- NG = Next Gen Accelerator Program entrant
- w/o = Walkover
- r = Retired
- d = Defaulted

=== Draw ===
First round
1	(United States) G Goldhoff (Chile) M Soto	3	6	[8]
(Ukraine) V Orlov (Argentina) S Rodríguez Taverna	6	4	[10]
Alt	(Italy) Tommaso Compagnucci (Italy) A Guerrieri	4	3
(Belgium) K Coppejans (Spain) O Roca Batalla	6	6
4	(India) S Banthia (Bulgaria) A Donski	5	6	[10]
(India) SDP Dev (India) Nitin Kumar Sinha	7	2	[7]
(Czech Republic) A Paulson (Czech Republic) M Vrbenský	6	6
(Moldova) R Albot (Romania) V Cornea	4	4
(Zimbabwe) CJ Lock (Netherlands) T Loof	5	2
(Romania) A Jecan (Romania) B Pavel	7	6
(Bolivia) M Dellien (Ecuador) Á Guillén Meza	6	6
3	(France) L Sanchez (Poland) S Walków	0	1
(Finland) Patrick Kaukovalta (Finland) P Niklas-Salminen	6	7^{7}
WC	(Romania) Gabriel Ghețu (Romania) RD Țurcanu	4	6^{1}
WC	(Romania) FC Jianu (Romania) L Preda	2	2
2	(Peru) A Merino (Germany) C Negritu	6	6

Quarterfinals
(Ukraine) V Orlov (Argentina) S Rodríguez Taverna	6	6
(Belgium) K Coppejans (Spain) O Roca Batalla	4	3
4	(India) S Banthia (Bulgaria) A Donski	6	7
(Czech Republic) A Paulson (Czech Republic) M Vrbenský	4	5
(Romania) A Jecan (Romania) B Pavel	7^{7}	6
(Bolivia) M Dellien (Ecuador) Á Guillén Meza	6^{4}	3
(Finland) P Kaukovalta (Finland) P Niklas-Salminen	7^{7}	4	[4]
2	(Peru) A Merino (Germany) C Negritu	6^{2}	6	[10]

Semifinals
(Ukraine) V Orlov (Argentina) S Rodríguez Taverna	5	6	[10]
4	(India) S Banthia (Bulgaria) A Donski	7	4	[8]
(Romania) A Jecan (Romania) B Pavel	6	7
2	(Peru) A Merino (Germany) C Negritu	2	5

Final
(Ukraine) V Orlov (Argentina) S Rodríguez Taverna	4	7^{7}	[10]
(Romania) A Jecan (Romania) B Pavel	6	6^{5}	[7]
