= 2025 Ion Țiriac Challenger – Singles =

Singles
- 2025 Ion Țiriac Challenger

Final
- Champion: (Italy) Francesco Maestrelli
- Runner-up: (France) Luka Pavlovic
- Score: 7–6^{(9–7)}, 6–4

Events
Singles	Doubles
- Ion Țiriac Challenger

Murkel Dellien was the defending champion but lost in the second round to Radu Mihai Papoe.

Francesco Maestrelli won the title after defeating Luka Pavlovic 7–6^{(9–7)}, 6–4 in the final.

== Seeds ==
1. (Brazil) Felipe Meligeni Alves (first round)
2. (Argentina) Juan Pablo Ficovich (semifinals)
3. (Hungary) Zsombor Piros (withdrew)
4. (Ecuador) Álvaro Guillén Meza (second round)
5. (Argentina) Santiago Rodríguez Taverna (first round)
6. (Spain) Pol Martín Tiffon (first round)
7. (Bolivia) Murkel Dellien (second round)
8. (Bulgaria) Dimitar Kuzmanov (first round)

== Draw ==
Key

- Q = Qualifier
- WC = Wild card
- LL = Lucky loser
- Alt = Alternate
- ITF = ITF entry
- PR = Protected ranking
- SR = Special ranking
- SE = Special exempt
- JE = Junior exempt
- JR = Junior Accelerator Programme entrant
- CO = College Accelerator Programme entrant
- NG = Next Gen Accelerator Program entrant
- w/o = Walkover
- r = Retired
- d = Defaulted

=== Finals ===
Semifinals
(Italy) Francesco Maestrelli	6	6
LL	(France) Tom Paris	0	2
(France) Luka Pavlovic	7^{7}	6
2	(Argentina) Juan Pablo Ficovich	6^{5}	3

Final
(Italy) Francesco Maestrelli	7^{9}	6
(France) Luka Pavlovic	6^{7}	4

=== Top half ===
First round
1	(Brazil) F Meligeni Alves	6	3	4
(Italy) F Maestrelli	4	6	6
(Belgium) K Coppejans	6	4	4
Q	(Bulgaria) A Donski	2	6	6
Alt	(Germany) M Topo	6	6
WC	(Romania) Gabriel Ghețu	3	0
(France) S Gueymard Wayenburg	6	3	6
5	(Argentina) S Rodríguez Taverna	3	6	3
LL	(Italy) Tommaso Compagnucci	4	6	3
LL	(France) T Paris	6	4	6
WC	(India) M Dhamne	2	6	7^{7}
(Germany) C Negritu	6	4	6^{3}
NG	(Switzerland) K Feldbausch	5	3
Q	(Romania) Radu Mihai Papoe	7	6
Q	(Moldova) R Albot	4	4
7	(Bolivia) M Dellien	6	6

Second round
(Italy) F Maestrelli	6	6
Q	(Bulgaria) A Donski	2	4
Alt	(Germany) M Topo	6	7
(France) S Gueymard Wayenburg	2	5
LL	(France) T Paris	6	6
WC	(India) M Dhamne	1	4
Q	(Romania) RM Papoe	6	6
7	(Bolivia) M Dellien	4	1

Quarterfinals
(Italy) F Maestrelli	2	6	7
Alt	(Germany) M Topo	6	4	5
LL	(France) T Paris	6	5	7^{7}
Q	(Romania) RM Papoe	2	7	6^{5}

Semifinals
(Italy) F Maestrelli	6	6
LL	(France) T Paris	0	2

=== Bottom half ===
First round
6	(Spain) P Martín Tiffon	4	4
(Romania) FC Jianu	6	6
(France) L Pavlovic	6	6
WC	(Romania) L Preda	0	0
Q	(Romania) GA Boitan	6	7
Q	(Italy) A Guerrieri	4	5
(Georgia (country)) S Purtseladze	6	4	2
4	(Ecuador) Á Guillén Meza	4	6	6
8	(Bulgaria) D Kuzmanov	6	4	2
(Lithuania) E Butvilas	3	6	6
(Portugal) F Ferreira Silva	6	6
(Chile) M Soto	4	4
JR	(Czech Republic) M Mrva	4	5
Q	(Spain) O Roca Batalla	6	7
I Gakhov	5	2
2	(Argentina) JP Ficovich	7	6

Second round
(Romania) FC Jianu	1	6^{4}
(France) L Pavlovic	6	7^{7}
Q	(Romania) GA Boitan	6	6
4	(Ecuador) Á Guillén Meza	2	1
(Lithuania) E Butvilas	4	3
(Portugal) F Ferreira Silva	6	6
Q	(Spain) O Roca Batalla	6^{3}	2
2	(Argentina) JP Ficovich	7^{7}	6

Quarterfinals
(France) L Pavlovic	6	6
Q	(Romania) GA Boitan	3	1
(Portugal) F Ferreira Silva	6^{2}	4
2	(Argentina) JP Ficovich	7^{7}	6

Semifinals
(France) L Pavlovic	7^{7}	6
2	(Argentina) JP Ficovich	6^{5}	3
