= 2015 Corrientes Challenger – Doubles =

Doubles
- 2015 Corrientes Challenger

Final
- Champions: (Chile) Julio Peralta; (Argentina) Horacio Zeballos
- Runners-up: (Argentina) Guillermo Durán; (Argentina) Máximo González
- Score: 6–2, 6–3

Events
Singles	Doubles
Corrientes Challenger	· 2022 →

This was the first edition of the tournament, Julio Peralta and Horacio Zeballos won the title defeating Guillermo Durán and Máximo González in the final 6–2, 6–3.

== Seeds ==
1. (Argentina) Guillermo Durán / (Argentina) Máximo González (final)
2. (Chile) Julio Peralta / (Argentina) Horacio Zeballos (champions)
3. (Argentina) Guido Andreozzi / (Peru) Sergio Galdós (semifinals)
4. (Portugal) Gastão Elias / (Argentina) Renzo Olivo (quarterfinals)

== Draw ==
=== Key ===
- Q = Qualifier
- WC = Wild card
- LL = Lucky loser
- Alt = Alternate
- SE = Special exempt
- PR = Protected ranking
- ITF = ITF entry
- JE = Junior exempt
- w/o = Walkover
- r = Retired
- d = Defaulted
- SR = Special ranking

First round

Quarterfinals

Semifinals

Final

1
- (Argentina) G Durán
- (Argentina) M González
7^{7}
7^{7}

- (Argentina) F Bagnis
- (Argentina) M Trungelliti
6^{3}
6^{1}

1
- (Argentina) G Durán
- (Argentina) M González
7^{7}
6

WC
(Argentina) Franco Capalbo
(Argentina) Geronimo Espin Busleiman
6
5
[12]

(Argentina) F Capalbo
(Argentina) G Espin Busleiman
6^{5}
2

- (France) A Michon
- (Brazil) F Romboli
1
7
[10]

1
- (Argentina) G Durán
- (Argentina) M González
6
7

4
- (Portugal) G Elias
- (Argentina) R Olivo
6
6

- (Bolivia) H Dellien
- (Dominican Republic) J Hernández
4
5

PR
- (Portugal) P Sousa
- (Portugal) L Tavares
3
1

4
- (Portugal) G Elias
- (Argentina) R Olivo
3
4

- (Bolivia) H Dellien
- (Dominican Republic) J Hernández
6
6

- (Bolivia) H Dellien
- (Dominican Republic) J Hernández
6
6

- (Argentina) F Argüello
- (Argentina) A Velotti
0
3

1
- (Argentina) G Durán
- (Argentina) M González
3
3

- (Uruguay) M Cuevas
- (Argentina) N Kicker
7^{7}
6^{6}
[10]

2
- (Chile) J Peralta
- (Argentina) H Zeballos
6
6

WC
- (Argentina) JP Ficovich
- (Argentina) M Peña López
6^{5}
7^{8}
[7]

- (Uruguay) M Cuevas
- (Argentina) N Kicker

WC
(Argentina) Matias Castro
(Japan) Ryusei Makiguchi
3
2

3
- (Argentina) G Andreozzi
- (Peru) S Galdós
w/o

3
- (Argentina) G Andreozzi
- (Peru) S Galdós
6
6

3
- (Argentina) G Andreozzi
- (Peru) S Galdós
3
2^{r}

- (Austria) M Linzer
- (Argentina) T Lipovšek Puches
3
0

2
- (Chile) J Peralta
- (Argentina) H Zeballos
6
2

(Argentina) F Coria
(Argentina) Juan Ignacio Galarza
6
6

(Argentina) F Coria
(Argentina) JI Galarza
2
1

(Argentina) H Casanova
(Argentina) M Kestelboim
1
4

2
- (Chile) J Peralta
- (Argentina) H Zeballos
6
6

2
- (Chile) J Peralta
- (Argentina) H Zeballos
6
6
