= 2015 Corrientes Challenger – Singles =

Singles
- 2015 Corrientes Challenger

Final
- Champion: (Argentina) Máximo González
- Runner-up: (Argentina) Diego Schwartzman
- Score: 3–6, 7–5, 6–4

Events
| Singles | Doubles |
| Corrientes Challenger | · 2022 → |

This was the first edition of the tournament, Máximo González won the title defeating Diego Schwartzman in the final 3–6, 7–5, 6–4.

== Seeds ==
1. (Argentina) Diego Schwartzman (final)
2. (Argentina) Guido Pella (quarterfinals)
3. (Argentina) Facundo Argüello (semifinals)
4. (Belgium) Kimmer Coppejans (quarterfinals)
5. (Argentina) Facundo Bagnis (semifinals)
6. (Argentina) Horacio Zeballos (second round)
7. (Argentina) Carlos Berlocq (first round)
8. (Argentina) Máximo González (champion)

== Draw ==
=== Key ===
- Q = Qualifier
- WC = Wild card
- LL = Lucky loser
- Alt = Alternate
- ITF = ITF entry
- PR = Protected ranking
- SR = Special ranking
- SE = Special exempt
- JE = Junior exempt
- JR = Junior Accelerator Programme entrant
- CO = College Accelerator Programme entrant
- NG = Next Gen Accelerator Program entrant
- w/o = Walkover
- r = Retired
- d = Defaulted

=== Finals ===
Semifinals
1 | (Argentina) Diego Schwartzman | 6 | 6
3 | (Argentina) Facundo Argüello | 2 | 2
8 | (Argentina) Máximo González | 7^{7} | 6
5 | (Argentina) Facundo Bagnis | 6^{5} | 3

Final
1 | (Argentina) Diego Schwartzman | 6 | 5 | 4
8 | (Argentina) Máximo González | 3 | 7 | 6

=== Top half ===
First round
1 | (Argentina) D Schwartzman | 6 | 6
(Brazil) F Romboli | 3 | 4
(Argentina) Juan Ignacio Galarza | 4 | 2
(Bolivia) H Dellien | 6 | 6
(Argentina) A Molteni | 6^{5} | 6 | 5
WC | (Argentina) A Velotti | 7^{7} | 3 | 7
(Austria) M Linzer | 7^{7} | 3 | 6
7 | (Argentina) C Berlocq | 6^{5} | 6 | 3
3 | (Argentina) F Argüello | 6 | 6
Q | (Japan) Ryusei Makiguchi | 2 | 0
Q | (Argentina) F Agamenone | 3 | 1
(Argentina) G Andreozzi | 6 | 6
(Portugal) G Elias | 6 | 6
(Argentina) R Olivo | 3 | 2
Q | (Belgium) J De Loore | 3 | 1
6 | (Argentina) H Zeballos | 6 | 6

Second round
1 | (Argentina) D Schwartzman | 7 | 6
(Bolivia) H Dellien | 5 | 0
WC | (Argentina) A Velotti | 3 | 4
(Austria) M Linzer | 6 | 6
3 | (Argentina) F Argüello | 6 | 1 | 6
(Argentina) G Andreozzi | 3 | 6 | 3
(Portugal) G Elias | 7^{7} | 6
6 | (Argentina) H Zeballos | 6^{4} | 2

Quarterfinals
1 | (Argentina) D Schwartzman | 7^{7} | 6
(Austria) M Linzer | 6^{3} | 2
3 | (Argentina) F Argüello | 6^{6} | 6 | 6
(Portugal) G Elias | 7^{8} | 1 | 0

Semifinals
1 | (Argentina) D Schwartzman | 6 | 6
3 | (Argentina) F Argüello | 2 | 2

=== Bottom half ===
First round
8 | (Argentina) M González | 7^{7} | 6
WC | (Argentina) JP Paz | 6^{3} | 2
WC | (Argentina) M Peña López | 0 | 0
(Argentina) F Coria | 6 | 6
(Argentina) T Lipovšek Puches | 3 | 4
(Argentina) M Trungelliti | 6 | 6
(Brazil) R Dutra Silva | 4 | 2
4 | (Belgium) K Coppejans | 6 | 6
5 | (Argentina) F Bagnis | 7^{7} | 6
(Portugal) P Sousa | 6^{3} | 4
Q | (Uruguay) M Cuevas | 6 | 6
WC | (Argentina) H Casanova | 1 | 2
(Argentina) N Kicker | 7 | 2 | 6
(France) A Michon | 5 | 6 | 4
(Dominican Republic) J Hernández | 2 | 4
2 | (Argentina) G Pella | 6 | 6

Second round
8 | (Argentina) M González | 6 | 6
(Argentina) F Coria | 2 | 4
(Argentina) M Trungelliti | 7 | 6^{0} | 2
4 | (Belgium) K Coppejans | 5 | 7^{7} | 6
5 | (Argentina) F Bagnis | 7^{7} | 6
Q | (Uruguay) M Cuevas | 6^{5} | 2
(Argentina) N Kicker | 6^{1} | 2
2 | (Argentina) G Pella | 7^{7} | 6

Quarterfinals
8 | (Argentina) M González | 6 | 6
4 | (Belgium) K Coppejans | 2 | 2
5 | (Argentina) F Bagnis | 7^{7} | 6
2 | (Argentina) G Pella | 6^{4} | 2

Semifinals
8 | (Argentina) M González | 7^{7} | 6
5 | (Argentina) F Bagnis | 6^{5} | 3
