= 2022 Corrientes Challenger – Singles =

Singles
- 2022 Corrientes Challenger

Final
- Champion: (Argentina) Francisco Comesaña
- Runner-up: (Argentina) Mariano Navone
- Score: 6–0, 6–3

Events
Singles	Doubles
- Corrientes Challenger

Máximo González was the defending champion when the event was last held in 2015, but he chose not to defend his title.

Francisco Comesaña won the title after defeating Mariano Navone 6–0, 6–3 in the final.

== Seeds ==
1. (Argentina) Juan Pablo Ficovich (semifinals)
2. (Argentina) Francisco Comesaña (champion)
3. (Colombia) Nicolás Mejía (first round)
4. (Argentina) Gonzalo Villanueva (first round)
5. (Dominican Republic) Nick Hardt (quarterfinals)
6. (Tunisia) Malek Jaziri (first round)
7. (Argentina) Facundo Juárez (second round)
8. (Peru) Nicolás Álvarez (first round)

== Draw ==
Key

- Q = Qualifier
- WC = Wild card
- LL = Lucky loser
- Alt = Alternate
- ITF = ITF entry
- PR = Protected ranking
- SR = Special ranking
- SE = Special exempt
- JE = Junior exempt
- JR = Junior Accelerator Programme entrant
- CO = College Accelerator Programme entrant
- NG = Next Gen Accelerator Program entrant
- w/o = Walkover
- r = Retired
- d = Defaulted

=== Finals ===
Semifinals
1	(Argentina) Juan Pablo Ficovich	2	6	4
(Argentina) Mariano Navone	6	3	6
(Argentina) Román Andrés Burruchaga	6	2	3
2	(Argentina) Francisco Comesaña	4	6	6

Final
(Argentina) Mariano Navone	0	3
2	(Argentina) Francisco Comesaña	6	6

=== Top half ===
First round
1	(Argentina) JP Ficovich	6	6
Q	(Argentina) Tomás Farjat	1	4
(Argentina) V Aboian	6	6
Q	(Argentina) Francisco Tomás Geschwind	3	1
(Brazil) G Heide	6	6
Alt	(Peru) J Panta	3	4
Alt	(Argentina) Fermín Tenti	2	5
5	(Dominican Republic) N Hardt	6	7
4	(Argentina) G Villanueva	5	4
(Argentina) M Navone	7	6
Alt	(Argentina) Ignacio Monzón	3	7^{7}	7
(Brazil) Wilson Leite	6	6^{3}	5
Q	(Argentina) Mateo Nicolás Martínez	4	2
(Spain) C Gómez-Herrera	6	6
WC	(Argentina) A Barrena	6	6
8	(Peru) N Álvarez	2	4

Second round
1	(Argentina) JP Ficovich	6	6
(Argentina) V Aboian	4	2
(Brazil) G Heide	1	2^{r}
5	(Dominican Republic) N Hardt	6	3
(Argentina) M Navone	6	6
Alt	(Argentina) I Monzón	2	4
(Spain) C Gómez-Herrera	4	6	6
WC	(Argentina) A Barrena	6	4	4

Quarterfinals
1	(Argentina) JP Ficovich	7^{7}	6
5	(Dominican Republic) N Hardt	6^{4}	4
(Argentina) M Navone	7^{7}	7^{7}
(Spain) C Gómez-Herrera	6^{4}	6^{1}

Semifinals
1	(Argentina) JP Ficovich	2	6	4
(Argentina) M Navone	6	3	6

=== Bottom half ===
First round
7	(Argentina) Facundo Juárez	6	6
(Bolivia) M Dellien	4	1
(Peru) A Huertas del Pino	1	1
(Argentina) AL Lingua Lavallén	6	6
Q	(Argentina) Leonardo Aboian	6	3	6^{2}
Q	(Argentina) G Andreozzi	1	6	7^{7}
(Argentina) RA Burruchaga	6	6
3	(Colombia) N Mejía	2	1
6	(Tunisia) M Jaziri	6^{2}	3
WC	(Argentina) L Midón	7^{7}	6
WC	(Argentina) Luciano Tacchi	3	3
(Brazil) JL Reis da Silva	6	6
(Argentina) MF Descotte	6	2	6
(Peru) C Huertas del Pino	4	6	4
Q	(Japan) N Nakagawa	2	2
2	(Argentina) F Comesaña	6	6

Second round
7	(Argentina) F Juárez	7^{8}	6^{5}	5
(Argentina) AL Lingua Lavallén	6^{6}	7^{7}	7
Q	(Argentina) G Andreozzi	2^{r}
(Argentina) RA Burruchaga	4
WC	(Argentina) L Midón	6	1	5
(Brazil) JL Reis da Silva	3	6	7
(Argentina) MF Descotte	7	2	4
2	(Argentina) F Comesaña	5	6	6

Quarterfinals
(Argentina) AL Lingua Lavallén	3	4
(Argentina) RA Burruchaga	6	6
(Brazil) JL Reis da Silva	1	2
2	(Argentina) F Comesaña	6	6

Semifinals
(Argentina) RA Burruchaga	6	2	3
2	(Argentina) F Comesaña	4	6	6
