= 2025 Ion Țiriac Challenger =

- Date: 30 June – 6 July
- Edition: 2nd
- Surface: Clay
- Location: Brașov, Romania

Champions

Singles
- (Italy) Francesco Maestrelli

Doubles
- (Ukraine) Vladyslav Orlov / (Argentina) Santiago Rodríguez Taverna
- Ion Țiriac Challenger

The 2025 Ion Țiriac Challenger was a professional tennis tournament played on clay courts. It was the second edition of the tournament which was part of the 2025 ATP Challenger Tour. It took place in Brașov, Romania between 30 June and 6 July 2025.

== Singles main-draw entrants ==
=== Seeds ===
| Country | Player | Rank^{1} | Seed |
|---|---|---|---|
| BRA | Felipe Meligeni Alves | 147 | 1 |
| ARG | Juan Pablo Ficovich | 156 | 2 |
| ~~HUN~~ | ~~Zsombor Piros~~ | ~~160~~ | ~~3~~ |
| ECU | Álvaro Guillén Meza | 192 | 4 |
| ARG | Santiago Rodríguez Taverna | 194 | 5 |
| ESP | Pol Martín Tiffon | 207 | 6 |
| BOL | Murkel Dellien | 223 | 7 |
| BUL | Dimitar Kuzmanov | 225 | 8 |

- ^{1} Rankings are as of 23 June 2025.

=== Other entrants ===
The following players received wildcards into the singles main draw:

- (India) Manas Dhamne
- (Romania) Gabriel Ghețu
- (Romania) Luca Preda

The following player received entry into the singles main draw through the Junior Accelerator programme:

- (Czech Republic) Maxim Mrva

The following player received entry into the singles main draw through the Next Gen Accelerator programme:

- (Switzerland) Kilian Feldbausch

The following player received entry into the singles main draw as an alternate:

- (Germany) Marko Topo

The following players received entry from the qualifying draw:

- (Moldova) Radu Albot
- (Romania) Gabi Adrian Boitan
- (Bulgaria) Alexander Donski
- (Italy) Andrea Guerrieri
- (Romania) Radu Mihai Papoe
- (Spain) Oriol Roca Batalla

The following players received entry as lucky losers:

- (Italy) Tommaso Compagnucci
- (France) Tom Paris

== Champions ==
=== Singles ===
- (Italy) Francesco Maestrelli def. (France) Luka Pavlovic 7–6^{(9–7)}, 6–4.

=== Doubles ===
- (Ukraine) Vladyslav Orlov / (Argentina) Santiago Rodríguez Taverna def. (Romania) Alexandru Jecan / (Romania) Bogdan Pavel 4–6, 7–6^{(7–5)}, [10–7].
