= 2024 Challenger Ciudad de Guayaquil – Doubles =

Doubles
- 2024 Challenger Ciudad de Guayaquil

Final
- Champions: (Poland) Karol Drzewiecki (Poland) Piotr Matuszewski
- Runners-up: (Brazil) Luís Britto (Brazil) Marcelo Zormann
- Score: 6–4, 7–6^{(7–2)}

Events
Singles	Doubles
← 2023 ·	Challenger Ciudad de Guayaquil	· 2025 →

Arklon and Conner Huertas del Pino were the defending champions but lost in the quarterfinals to Karol Drzewiecki and Piotr Matuszewski.

Drzewiecki and Matuszewski won the title after defeating Luís Britto and Marcelo Zormann 6–4, 7–6^{(7–2)} in the final.

== Seeds ==
1. (Poland) Karol Drzewiecki / (Poland) Piotr Matuszewski (champions)
2. (Bolivia) Boris Arias / (Bolivia) Federico Zeballos (first round)
3. (Argentina) Federico Agustín Gómez / (Venezuela) Luis David Martínez (semifinals)
4. (Brazil) Luís Britto / (Brazil) Marcelo Zormann (final)

== Draw ==
=== Key ===
- Q = Qualifier
- WC = Wild card
- LL = Lucky loser
- Alt = Alternate
- ITF = ITF entry
- PR = Protected ranking
- SR = Special ranking
- SE = Special exempt
- JE = Junior exempt
- JR = Junior Accelerator Programme entrant
- CO = College Accelerator Programme entrant
- NG = Next Gen Accelerator Program entrant
- w/o = Walkover
- r = Retired
- d = Defaulted

=== Draw ===
First round
1	(Poland) K Drzewiecki (Poland) P Matuszewski	6	6
Alt	(Argentina) A Barrena (Argentina) R Olivo	3	3
(Peru) A Huertas del Pino (Peru) C Huertas del Pino	6	0	[10]
(Spain) O Roca Batalla (Brazil) PA Saraiva dos Santos	3	6	[5]
3	(Argentina) FA Gómez (Venezuela) LD Martínez	6	6
WC	(Ecuador) Ángel Véliz (Ecuador) Lucas Yúnez	2	4
(Ecuador) A Andrade (Brazil) F Romboli	6^{8}	6	[10]
(Bolivia) M Dellien (Uruguay) F Roncadelli	7^{10}	2	[5]
(Uruguay) I Carou (Argentina) M Kestelboim	3	6	[3]
(Denmark) E Møller (Netherlands) Ryan Nijboer	6	3	[10]
WC	(Ecuador) Francisco Castro (Ecuador) Marcos Lee Chan Baratau	1	1
4	(Brazil) L Britto (Brazil) M Zormann	6	6
(Netherlands) Michiel de Krom (Czech Republic) V Kopřiva	6	6
(Argentina) Leonardo Aboian (Argentina) RA Burruchaga	1	3
(United Kingdom) S Duncan (United States) H Reese	6	6
2	(Bolivia) B Arias (Bolivia) F Zeballos	3	2

Quarterfinals
1	(Poland) K Drzewiecki (Poland) P Matuszewski	6^{7}	6	[10]
(Peru) A Huertas del Pino (Peru) C Huertas del Pino	7^{9}	4	[8]
3	(Argentina) FA Gómez (Venezuela) LD Martínez	6	6
(Ecuador) A Andrade (Brazil) F Romboli	4	2
(Denmark) E Møller (Netherlands) R Nijboer	3	6	[7]
4	(Brazil) L Britto (Brazil) M Zormann	6	1	[10]
(Netherlands) M de Krom (Czech Republic) V Kopřiva	6	6
(United Kingdom) S Duncan (United States) H Reese	1	3

Semifinals
1	(Poland) K Drzewiecki (Poland) P Matuszewski	6	7^{9}
3	(Argentina) FA Gómez (Venezuela) LD Martínez	3	6^{7}
4	(Brazil) L Britto (Brazil) M Zormann	2	6	[10]
(Netherlands) M de Krom (Czech Republic) V Kopřiva	6	3	[7]

Final
1	(Poland) K Drzewiecki (Poland) P Matuszewski	6	7^{7}
4	(Brazil) L Britto (Brazil) M Zormann	4	6^{2}
