= 2026 Open de Sion – Doubles =

Doubles
- 2026 Open de Sion

Final
- Champions: (Austria) Maximilian Neuchrist (Czech Republic) David Poljak
- Runners-up: (Bolivia) Murkel Dellien (Argentina) Facundo Mena
- Score: 6–4, 6–4

Events
Singles	Doubles
- Open de Sion

This was the first edition of the tournament.

Maximilian Neuchrist and David Poljak won the title after defeating Murkel Dellien and Facundo Mena 6–4, 6–4 in the final.

== Seeds ==
1. (Austria) Maximilian Neuchrist / (Czech Republic) David Poljak (champions)
2. (Bulgaria) Anthony Genov / (Germany) Kai Wehnelt (first round)
3. (Argentina) Valentín Basel / (Argentina) Franco Ribero (quarterfinals)
4. (Bolivia) Murkel Dellien / (Argentina) Facundo Mena (final)

== Draw ==
Key

- Q = Qualifier
- WC = Wild card
- LL = Lucky loser
- Alt = Alternate
- ITF = ITF entry
- PR = Protected ranking
- SR = Special ranking
- SE = Special exempt
- JE = Junior exempt
- JR = Junior Accelerator Programme entrant
- CO = College Accelerator Programme entrant
- NG = Next Gen Accelerator Program entrant
- w/o = Walkover
- r = Retired
- d = Defaulted

First round
1	(Austria) M Neuchrist (Czech Republic) D Poljak	7^{7}	6
Alt	(Argentina) Thiago Cigarrán (Argentina) Lucio Ratti	6^{4}	4
WC	(Switzerland) H Bernet (Switzerland) D Stricker	6	7
(India) A Kalyanpur (India) J Nedunchezhiyan	2	5
3	(Argentina) Valentín Basel (Argentina) F Ribero	w/o
Andrey Chepelev (Bulgaria) D Kuzmanov
(Japan) Yamato Sueoka (Japan) N Tajima	6^{6}	7^{11}	[4]
(Peru) A Merino (United States) Michael Zhu	7^{8}	6^{9}	[10]
(France) G Blancaneaux (Netherlands) M Hermans	6	2	[11]
(Argentina) Juan Estévez (Argentina) JM La Serna	2	6	[9]
(United States) Zachary Fuchs (Venezuela) B Pérez	7^{7}	5	[7]
4	(Bolivia) M Dellien (Argentina) F Mena	6^{4}	7	[10]
(Bulgaria) P Nesterov (Ukraine) O Ovcharenko	7^{7}	4	[10]
(Italy) Tommaso Compagnucci (Italy) G Ricca	6^{5}	6	[8]
(United States) C Papa (China) B Zheng	2	6	[10]
2	(Bulgaria) A Genov (Germany) K Wehnelt	6	4	[5]

Quarterfinals
1	(Austria) M Neuchrist (Czech Republic) D Poljak	w/o
WC	(Switzerland) H Bernet (Switzerland) D Stricker
3	(Argentina) V Basel (Argentina) F Ribero	6^{7}	6	[10]
(Peru) A Merino (United States) M Zhu	7^{9}	3	[12]
(France) G Blancaneaux (Netherlands) M Hermans	5	5
4	(Bolivia) M Dellien (Argentina) F Mena	7	7
(Bulgaria) P Nesterov (Ukraine) O Ovcharenko	6	6
(United States) C Papa (China) B Zheng	3	1

Semifinals
1	(Austria) M Neuchrist (Czech Republic) D Poljak	6	6
(Peru) A Merino (United States) M Zhu	2	2
4	(Bolivia) M Dellien (Argentina) F Mena	7^{7}	6
(Bulgaria) P Nesterov (Ukraine) O Ovcharenko	6^{3}	2

Final
1	(Austria) M Neuchrist (Czech Republic) D Poljak	6	6
4	(Bolivia) M Dellien (Argentina) F Mena	4	4
