= 2026 Ion Țiriac Challenger – Singles =

Singles
- 2026 Ion Țiriac Challenger

Final
- Champion: (Hungary) Zsombor Piros
- Runner-up: (United States) Keegan Smith
- Score: 6–4, 6–4

Events
Singles	Doubles
- Ion Țiriac Challenger

Francesco Maestrelli was the defending champion but lost in the first round to Ognjen Milić.

Zsombor Piros won the title after defeating Keegan Smith 6–4, 6–4 in the final.

== Seeds ==
1. (Italy) Francesco Maestrelli (first round)
2. (Hungary) Zsombor Piros (champion)
3. (Italy) Federico Cinà (first round)
4. (France) Harold Mayot (first round)
5. (Belgium) Gilles-Arnaud Bailly (first round)
6. (France) Luka Pavlovic (second round)
7. (Lithuania) Edas Butvilas (first round)
8. (Argentina) Lautaro Midón (second round)

== Draw ==
Key

- Q = Qualifier
- WC = Wild card
- LL = Lucky loser
- Alt = Alternate
- ITF = ITF entry
- PR = Protected ranking
- SR = Special ranking
- SE = Special exempt
- JE = Junior exempt
- JR = Junior Accelerator Programme entrant
- CO = College Accelerator Programme entrant
- NG = Next Gen Accelerator Program entrant
- w/o = Walkover
- r = Retired
- d = Defaulted

=== Finals ===
Semifinals
(Argentina) Guido Iván Justo	6^{4}	2
(United States) Keegan Smith	7^{7}	6
Alt	(Poland) Maks Kaśnikowski	6	3	2
2	(Hungary) Zsombor Piros	4	6	6

Final
(United States) Keegan Smith	4	4
2	(Hungary) Zsombor Piros	6	6

=== Top half ===
First round
1	(Italy) F Maestrelli	3	7^{10}	3
NG	(Serbia) O Milić	6	6^{8}	6
(Argentina) GI Justo	6	6
LL	(Romania) Sebastian Gima	2	1
WC	(Romania) C Crețu	5	1
Q	(Sweden) O Wallin	7	6
(Portugal) F Ferreira Silva	6	6
7	(Lithuania) E Butvilas	3	3
4	(France) H Mayot	2	0
(Bosnia and Herzegovina) A Nedić	6	6
(Ecuador) Á Guillén Meza	6	2	4
(Uruguay) F Roncadelli	4	6	6
(United States) K Smith	4	7^{8}	6
Q	(Romania) Gabriel Ghețu	6	6^{6}	4
(Germany) H Squire	6	3	6
5	(Belgium) GA Bailly	3	6	4

Second round
NG	(Serbia) O Milić	4	6	2
(Argentina) GI Justo	6	3	6
Q	(Sweden) O Wallin	6	6
(Portugal) F Ferreira Silva	4	3
(Bosnia and Herzegovina) A Nedić	6	6
(Uruguay) F Roncadelli	3	4
(United States) K Smith	7^{7}	6
(Germany) H Squire	6^{5}	2

Quarterfinals
(Argentina) GI Justo	6	6
Q	(Sweden) O Wallin	1	4
(Bosnia and Herzegovina) A Nedić	1	6^{3}
(United States) K Smith	6	7^{7}

Semifinals
(Argentina) GI Justo	6^{4}	2
(United States) K Smith	7^{7}	6

=== Bottom half ===
First round
8	(Argentina) L Midón	6^{3}	7	6
WC	(Romania) Ștefan Horia Haita	7^{7}	5	0
(Spain) M Alcalá Gurri	6^{5}	6	3
(France) S Gueymard Wayenburg	7^{7}	3	6
Alt	(Poland) M Kaśnikowski	7^{7}	6
(Ecuador) A Andrade	6^{4}	1
JR	(Spain) A Santamarta Roig	6	6
3	(Italy) F Cinà	4	3
6	(France) L Pavlovic	7^{7}	6
Q	(Japan) A Santillan	6^{2}	3
Q	I Simakin	6	4	2
Q	(Bulgaria) D Kuzmanov	3	6	6
WC	(Romania) Ștefan Paloși	6	6^{5}	7
LL	(Kazakhstan) D Yevseyev	4	7^{7}	5
Q	(Moldova) R Albot	1	4
2	(Hungary) Z Piros	6	6

Second round
8	(Argentina) L Midón	6	3	4
(France) S Gueymard Wayenburg	4	6	6
Alt	(Poland) M Kaśnikowski	6	6
JR	(Spain) A Santamarta Roig	3	2
6	(France) L Pavlovic	6	2	6^{5}
Q	(Bulgaria) D Kuzmanov	4	6	7^{7}
WC	(Romania) Ș Paloși	3	6	1
2	(Hungary) Z Piros	6	3	6

Quarterfinals
(France) S Gueymard Wayenburg	4	2
Alt	(Poland) M Kaśnikowski	6	6
Q	(Bulgaria) D Kuzmanov	2	3
2	(Hungary) Z Piros	6	6

Semifinals
Alt	(Poland) M Kaśnikowski	6	3	2
2	(Hungary) Z Piros	4	6	6
