= 2024 Ion Țiriac Challenger – Singles =

Singles
- 2024 Ion Țiriac Challenger

Final
- Champion: (Bolivia) Murkel Dellien
- Runner-up: (Kazakhstan) Dmitry Popko
- Score: 6–3, 7–5

Events
Singles	Doubles
- Ion Țiriac Challenger

This was the first edition of the tournament.

Murkel Dellien won the title after defeating Dmitry Popko 6–3, 7–5 in the final.

== Seeds ==
1. (Argentina) Román Andrés Burruchaga (first round)
2. (United States) Nicolas Moreno de Alboran (semifinals)
3. (Brazil) Gustavo Heide (second round)
4. (France) Valentin Royer (second round)
5. (Bolivia) Murkel Dellien (champion)
6. (Bosnia and Herzegovina) Nerman Fatić (semifinals)
7. (Argentina) Juan Pablo Ficovich (first round)
8. (Kazakhstan) Dmitry Popko (final)

== Draw ==
Key

- Q = Qualifier
- WC = Wild card
- LL = Lucky loser
- Alt = Alternate
- ITF = ITF entry
- PR = Protected ranking
- SR = Special ranking
- SE = Special exempt
- JE = Junior exempt
- JR = Junior Accelerator Programme entrant
- CO = College Accelerator Programme entrant
- NG = Next Gen Accelerator Program entrant
- w/o = Walkover
- r = Retired
- d = Defaulted

=== Finals ===
Semifinals
5	(Bolivia) Murkel Dellien	6	6
6	(Bosnia and Herzegovina) Nerman Fatić	3	2
8	(Kazakhstan) Dmitry Popko	6^{2}	6	6
2	(United States) Nicolas Moreno de Alboran	7^{7}	2	2

Final
5	(Bolivia) Murkel Dellien	6	7
8	(Kazakhstan) Dmitry Popko	3	5

=== Top half ===
First round
1	(Argentina) RA Burruchaga	4	6	3
(Czech Republic) D Svrčina	6	0	6
Q	(Romania) Radu Mihai Papoe	6	6^{5}	7
Q	(Ukraine) V Orlov	3	7^{7}	5
(Argentina) GA Olivieri	7^{7}	6
Q	(Romania) Vlad Andrei Dancu	6^{4}	1
WC	(Romania) GA Boitan	3	3
5	(Bolivia) M Dellien	6	6
4	(France) V Royer	6	6
(Czech Republic) M Krumich	3	4
WC	(Romania) C Crețu	7	4	6
(Croatia) L Mikrut	5	6	2
Alt	(Romania) ND Ionel	6^{5}	4
(Ukraine) V Sachko	7^{7}	6
(Paraguay) AD Vallejo	4	6^{4}
6	(Bosnia and Herzegovina) N Fatić	6	7^{7}

Second round
(Czech Republic) D Svrčina	5	2
Q	(Romania) RM Papoe	7	6
(Argentina) GA Olivieri	2^{r}
5	(Bolivia) M Dellien	4
4	(France) V Royer	4	6^{4}
WC	(Romania) C Crețu	6	7^{7}
(Ukraine) V Sachko	4	4
6	(Bosnia and Herzegovina) N Fatić	6	6

Quarterfinals
Q	(Romania) RM Papoe	4	4
5	(Bolivia) M Dellien	6	6
WC	(Romania) C Crețu	6^{4}	4
6	(Bosnia and Herzegovina) N Fatić	7^{7}	6

Semifinals
5	(Bolivia) M Dellien	6	6
6	(Bosnia and Herzegovina) N Fatić	3	2

=== Bottom half ===
First round
8	(Kazakhstan) D Popko	6	6
Q	(Czech Republic) H Bartoň	4	3
Q	(Romania) Ștefan Paloși	6^{4}	6	6
(Italy) Alexander Weis	7^{7}	4	4
(Tunisia) M Echargui	6	5	1
(Romania) FC Jianu	4	7	6
(Brazil) O Luz	5	4
3	(Brazil) G Heide	7	6
7	(Argentina) JP Ficovich	6	6^{5}	3
(Turkey) E Kırkın	2	7^{7}	6
(Croatia) M Dodig	3	7^{7}	6
Q	(Netherlands) J Sels	6	6^{3}	2
(Portugal) G Elias	6^{6}	2
(Spain) J Barranco Cosano	7^{8}	6
WC	(Romania) Ioan Alexandru Chiriță	2	1
2	(United States) N Moreno de Alboran	6	6

Second round
8	(Kazakhstan) D Popko	7	7
Q	(Romania) Ș Paloși	5	5
(Romania) FC Jianu	6	3	6
3	(Brazil) G Heide	3	6	2
(Turkey) E Kırkın	1	3
(Croatia) M Dodig	6	6
(Spain) J Barranco Cosano	3	1
2	(United States) N Moreno de Alboran	6	6

Quarterfinals
8	(Kazakhstan) D Popko	1	7	6
(Romania) FC Jianu	6	5	4
(Croatia) M Dodig	4	4
2	(United States) N Moreno de Alboran	6	6

Semifinals
8	(Kazakhstan) D Popko	6^{2}	6	6
2	(United States) N Moreno de Alboran	7^{7}	2	2
