= 2024 Ion Țiriac Challenger =

- Date: 1 – 7 July
- Edition: 1st
- Surface: Clay
- Location: Brașov, Romania

Champions

Singles
- (Bolivia) Murkel Dellien

Doubles
- (Spain) Javier Barranco Cosano / (United States) Nicolas Moreno de Alboran
Ion Țiriac Challenger	· 2025 →

The 2024 Ion Țiriac Challenger was a professional tennis tournament played on clay courts. It was the first edition of the tournament which was part of the 2024 ATP Challenger Tour. It took place in Brașov, Romania between 1 and 7 July 2024.

== Singles main-draw entrants ==
=== Seeds ===
Country	Player	Rank^{1}	Seed
ARG	Román Andrés Burruchaga	144	1
USA	Nicolas Moreno de Alboran	148	2
BRA	Gustavo Heide	187	3
FRA	Valentin Royer	205	4
BOL	Murkel Dellien	214	5
BIH	Nerman Fatić	219	6
ARG	Juan Pablo Ficovich	222	7
KAZ	Dmitry Popko	224	8

- ^{1} Rankings are as of 24 June 2024.

=== Other entrants ===
The following players received wildcards into the singles main draw:

- (Romania) Gabi Adrian Boitan
- (Romania) Ioan Alexandru Chiriță
- (Romania) Cezar Crețu

The following player received entry into the singles main draw as an alternate:

- (Romania) Nicholas David Ionel

The following players received entry from the qualifying draw:

- (Czech Republic) Hynek Bartoň
- (Romania) Vlad Andrei Dancu
- (Ukraine) Vladyslav Orlov
- (Romania) Ștefan Paloși
- (Romania) Radu Mihai Papoe
- (Netherlands) Jelle Sels

== Champions ==
=== Singles ===
- (Bolivia) Murkel Dellien def. (Kazakhstan) Dmitry Popko 6–3, 7–5.

=== Doubles ===
- (Spain) Javier Barranco Cosano / (United States) Nicolas Moreno de Alboran def. (Poland) Karol Drzewiecki / (Poland) Piotr Matuszewski 3–6, 6–1, [17–15].
