= 2024 Challenger Ciudad de Guayaquil – Singles =

Singles
- 2024 Challenger Ciudad de Guayaquil

Final
- Champion: (Argentina) Federico Agustín Gómez
- Runner-up: (Chile) Tomás Barrios Vera
- Score: 6–1, 6–4

Events
Singles	Doubles
- Challenger Ciudad de Guayaquil

Alejandro Tabilo was the defending champion but chose not to defend his title.

Federico Agustín Gómez won the title after defeating Tomás Barrios Vera 6–1, 6–4 in the final.

== Seeds ==
1. (Argentina) Francisco Comesaña (second round)
2. (Argentina) Federico Coria (semifinals)
3. (Colombia) Daniel Elahi Galán (first round)
4. (Argentina) Román Andrés Burruchaga (semifinals)
5. (Argentina) Marco Trungelliti (first round)
6. (Argentina) Juan Manuel Cerúndolo (second round, retired)
7. (Czech Republic) Vít Kopřiva (second round)
8. (Argentina) Federico Agustín Gómez (champion)

== Draw ==
Key

- Q = Qualifier
- WC = Wild card
- LL = Lucky loser
- Alt = Alternate
- ITF = ITF entry
- PR = Protected ranking
- SR = Special ranking
- SE = Special exempt
- JE = Junior exempt
- JR = Junior Accelerator Programme entrant
- CO = College Accelerator Programme entrant
- NG = Next Gen Accelerator Program entrant
- w/o = Walkover
- r = Retired
- d = Defaulted

=== Finals ===
Semifinals
8	(Argentina) Federico Agustín Gómez	6	6
4	(Argentina) Román Andrés Burruchaga	3	0
(Chile) Tomás Barrios Vera	4	7	6
2	(Argentina) Federico Coria	6	5	1

Final
8	(Argentina) Federico Agustín Gómez	6	6
(Chile) Tomás Barrios Vera	1	4

=== Top half ===
First round
1	(Argentina) F Comesaña	6	6
WC	(Ecuador) Francisco Castro	1	0
(Lithuania) V Gaubas	4	6	3
Q	(Argentina) A Barrena	6	3	6
WC	(Ecuador) Ángel Véliz	0	1
Q	(Netherlands) Ryan Nijboer	6	6
Q	(France) Mathys Erhard	4	6	4
8	(Argentina) FA Gómez	6	4	6
4	(Argentina) RA Burruchaga	7^{7}	0
(Brazil) P Sakamoto	6^{1}	0^{r}
(Bolivia) M Dellien	6	6
WC	(Ecuador) Marcos Lee Chan Baratau	1	0
Alt	(Portugal) G Elias	1	1
(Spain) O Roca Batalla	6	6
Q	(United States) G Johns	3	1
7	(Czech Republic) V Kopřiva	6	6

Second round
1	(Argentina) F Comesaña	3	4
Q	(Argentina) A Barrena	6	6
Q	(Netherlands) R Nijboer	6	3	0
8	(Argentina) FA Gómez	3	6	6
4	(Argentina) RA Burruchaga	1	6	7
(Bolivia) M Dellien	6	4	5
(Spain) O Roca Batalla	6	6
7	(Czech Republic) V Kopřiva	3	4

Quarterfinals
Q	(Argentina) A Barrena	3	2
8	(Argentina) FA Gómez	6	6
4	(Argentina) RA Burruchaga	4	6	6
(Spain) O Roca Batalla	6	2	4

Semifinals
8	(Argentina) FA Gómez	6	6
4	(Argentina) RA Burruchaga	3	0

=== Bottom half ===
First round
6	(Argentina) JM Cerúndolo	6	6
Alt	(Argentina) R Olivo	2	3
(Portugal) H Rocha	4	6	6
Q	(South Korea) G Campaña Lee	6	2	2
(Denmark) E Møller	6	5	4
(Peru) G Bueno	4	7	6
(Chile) T Barrios Vera	6	7
3	(Colombia) DE Galán	4	5
5	(Argentina) M Trungelliti	7	3	6^{3}
(Ecuador) A Andrade	5	6	7^{7}
(Peru) JP Varillas	5	6	6
(Peru) I Buse	7	4	1
Alt	(Uruguay) F Roncadelli	0	2
Q	(Argentina) M Kestelboim	6	6
PR	(Argentina) N Kicker	6^{5}	4
2	(Argentina) F Coria	7^{7}	6

Second round
6	(Argentina) JM Cerúndolo	5	7^{7}	3^{r}
(Portugal) H Rocha	7	6^{5}	3
(Peru) G Bueno	6^{4}	2
(Chile) T Barrios Vera	7^{7}	6
(Ecuador) A Andrade	7^{7}	6
(Peru) JP Varillas	6^{3}	2
Q	(Argentina) M Kestelboim	5	2
2	(Argentina) F Coria	7	6

Quarterfinals
(Portugal) H Rocha	1	2
(Chile) T Barrios Vera	6	6
(Ecuador) A Andrade	2	0^{r}
2	(Argentina) F Coria	6	1

Semifinals
(Chile) T Barrios Vera	4	7	6
2	(Argentina) F Coria	6	5	1
