= 2026 Challenger de Buenos Aires – Singles =

Singles
- 2026 Challenger de Buenos Aires

Final
- Champion: (Argentina) Alex Barrena
- Runner-up: (Argentina) Facundo Mena
- Score: 6–4, 6–0

Events
Singles	Doubles
- Challenger de Buenos Aires

Román Andrés Burruchaga was the defending champion but chose not to defend his title.

Alex Barrena won the title after defeating Facundo Mena 6–4, 6–0 in the final.

== Seeds ==
1. (Argentina) Francisco Comesaña (second round)
2. (Bolivia) Hugo Dellien (second round)
3. (Spain) Pedro Martínez (first round)
4. (Bolivia) Juan Carlos Prado Ángelo (quarterfinals)
5. (Peru) Gonzalo Bueno (withdrew)
6. (Peru) Juan Pablo Varillas (quarterfinals)
7. (Argentina) Alex Barrena (champion)
8. (Argentina) Facundo Mena (final)

== Draw ==
Key

- Q = Qualifier
- WC = Wild card
- LL = Lucky loser
- Alt = Alternate
- ITF = ITF entry
- PR = Protected ranking
- SR = Special ranking
- SE = Special exempt
- JE = Junior exempt
- JR = Junior Accelerator Programme entrant
- CO = College Accelerator Programme entrant
- NG = Next Gen Accelerator Program entrant
- w/o = Walkover
- r = Retired
- d = Defaulted

=== Finals ===
Semifinals
Q	(Uruguay) Joaquín Aguilar Cardozo	4	3
7	(Argentina) Alex Barrena	6	6
(Brazil) Pedro Boscardin Dias	5	0
8	(Argentina) Facundo Mena	7	6

Final
7	(Argentina) Alex Barrena	6	6
8	(Argentina) Facundo Mena	4	0

=== Top half ===
First round
1	(Argentina) F Comesaña	6	4	6
(Argentina) Juan Estévez	1	6	2
WC	(Argentina) Carlos María Zárate	2	1
Q	(Uruguay) J Aguilar Cardozo	6	6
(Bolivia) M Dellien	6	6
(Argentina) H Casanova	3	4
Q	(Argentina) Tomás Farjat	6	2	6^{2}
6	(Peru) JP Varillas	3	6	7^{7}
4	(Bolivia) JC Prado Ángelo	7^{7}	7^{11}
Q	(Argentina) Lorenzo Joaquín Rodríguez	6^{5}	6^{9}
(Argentina) GA Olivieri	6	2	3
Q	(Argentina) V Aboian	1	6	6
(Argentina) JB Torres	3	4
Alt	(Argentina) JP Ficovich	6	6
WC	(Argentina) Valentín Garay	2	2
7	(Argentina) A Barrena	6	6

Second round
1	(Argentina) F Comesaña	5	7^{7}	4
Q	(Uruguay) J Aguilar Cardozo	7	6^{5}	6
(Bolivia) M Dellien	6	5	4
6	(Peru) JP Varillas	4	7	6
4	(Bolivia) JC Prado Ángelo	6	6
Q	(Argentina) V Aboian	2	1
Alt	(Argentina) JP Ficovich	3	5
7	(Argentina) A Barrena	6	7

Quarterfinals
Q	(Uruguay) J Aguilar Cardozo	6	6
6	(Peru) JP Varillas	2	4
4	(Bolivia) JC Prado Ángelo	4	4
7	(Argentina) A Barrena	6	6

Semifinals
Q	(Uruguay) J Aguilar Cardozo	4	3
7	(Argentina) A Barrena	6	6

=== Bottom half ===
First round
LL	(Brazil) Bruno Fernandez	2	0
(Uruguay) F Roncadelli	6	6
Q	(Argentina) S Rodríguez Taverna	3	1
(Brazil) P Boscardin Dias	6	6
Alt	(Argentina) Lucio Ratti	7^{7}	3	5
WC	(Argentina) F Coria	6^{3}	6	7
(Brazil) E Ribeiro	7^{7}	6
3	(Spain) P Martínez	6^{4}	3
8	(Argentina) F Mena	6	6
PR	(Argentina) R Olivo	2	1
(Argentina) G Villanueva	4	6	1
(Argentina) GI Justo	6	3	6
Q	(Argentina) Tomás Martínez	6	2	0
(Argentina) N Kicker	1	6	6
(Brazil) M Pucinelli de Almeida	7	4	4
2	(Bolivia) H Dellien	5	6	6

Second round
(Uruguay) F Roncadelli	6	6^{5}	3
(Brazil) P Boscardin Dias	0	7^{7}	6
WC	(Argentina) F Coria	4	5
(Brazil) E Ribeiro	6	7
8	(Argentina) F Mena	6	7^{7}
(Argentina) GI Justo	4	6^{0}
(Argentina) N Kicker	4	7	6
2	(Bolivia) H Dellien	6	5	0

Quarterfinals
(Brazil) P Boscardin Dias	6	6
(Brazil) E Ribeiro	4	4
8	(Argentina) F Mena	6	6
(Argentina) N Kicker	4	4

Semifinals
(Brazil) P Boscardin Dias	5	0
8	(Argentina) F Mena	7	6
