= 2025 Open de Oeiras – Doubles =

Doubles
- 2025 Open de Oeiras

Final
- Champions: (Poland) Karol Drzewiecki (Poland) Piotr Matuszewski
- Runners-up: (Portugal) Francisco Cabral (Austria) Lucas Miedler
- Score: 6–4, 3–6, [10–8]

Events
Singles	Doubles
← 2024 ·	Open de Oeiras	· 2025 →

Anirudh Chandrasekar and Arjun Kadhe were the defending champions but only Chandrasekar chose to defend his title, partnering David Vega Hernández. They lost in the first round to Francisco Cabral and Lucas Miedler.

Karol Drzewiecki and Piotr Matuszewski won the title after defeating Cabral and Miedler 6–4, 3–6, [10–8] in the final.

== Seeds ==
1. (Portugal) Francisco Cabral / (Austria) Lucas Miedler (final)
2. (Poland) Karol Drzewiecki / (Poland) Piotr Matuszewski (champions)
3. (France) Jonathan Eysseric / (Brazil) Orlando Luz (first round)
4. (Brazil) Marcelo Demoliner / (Netherlands) Matwé Middelkoop (first round)

== Draw ==
Key

- Q = Qualifier
- WC = Wild card
- LL = Lucky loser
- Alt = Alternate
- ITF = ITF entry
- PR = Protected ranking
- SR = Special ranking
- SE = Special exempt
- JE = Junior exempt
- JR = Junior Accelerator Programme entrant
- CO = College Accelerator Programme entrant
- NG = Next Gen Accelerator Program entrant
- w/o = Walkover
- r = Retired
- d = Defaulted

=== Draw ===
First round
1	(Portugal) F Cabral (Austria) L Miedler	6	6
(India) A Chandrasekar (Spain) D Vega Hernández	3	4
WC	(Portugal) G Elias (Portugal) T Pereira	3	6	[10]
(India) S Banthia (United States) T Boyer	6	1	[6]
3	(France) J Eysseric (Brazil) O Luz	2	4
(Italy) M Bortolotti (Romania) V Cornea	6	6
(India) J Nedunchezhiyan (India) VS Prashanth	w/o
(Switzerland) J Kym (Spain) C Taberner
(Brazil) T Monteiro (Brazil) T Seyboth Wild
(India) N Kaliyanda Poonacha (Spain) S Martos Gornés	w/o
WC	(Portugal) Francisco Rocha (Portugal) H Rocha	6	3	[10]
4	(Brazil) M Demoliner (Netherlands) M Middelkoop	4	6	[8]
(Finland) P Niklas-Salminen (Poland) S Walków	6	6^{5}	[13]
(Ukraine) D Molchanov (Netherlands) M Veldheer	3	7^{7}	[11]
(Switzerland) J Paul (Netherlands) D Pel	4	4
2	(Poland) K Drzewiecki (Poland) P Matuszewski	6	6

Quarterfinals
1	(Portugal) F Cabral (Austria) L Miedler	6	6
WC	(Portugal) G Elias (Portugal) T Pereira	1	4
(Italy) M Bortolotti (Romania) V Cornea	5	3
(India) J Nedunchezhiyan (India) VS Prashanth	7	1^{r}
(India) N Kaliyanda Poonacha (Spain) S Martos Gornés	6	6
WC	(Portugal) F Rocha (Portugal) H Rocha	2	4
(Finland) P Niklas-Salminen (Poland) S Walków	2	4
2	(Poland) K Drzewiecki (Poland) P Matuszewski	6	6

Semifinals
1	(Portugal) F Cabral (Austria) L Miedler	6	6
(Italy) M Bortolotti (Romania) V Cornea	4	4
(India) N Kaliyanda Poonacha (Spain) S Martos Gornés	6^{2}	6	[2]
2	(Poland) K Drzewiecki (Poland) P Matuszewski	7^{7}	2	[10]

Final
1	(Portugal) F Cabral (Austria) L Miedler	4	6	[8]
2	(Poland) K Drzewiecki (Poland) P Matuszewski	6	3	[10]
