= 2026 Challenger de Buenos Aires =

- Date: 21 – 27 September
- Edition: 15th
- Surface: Clay
- Location: Buenos Aires, Argentina

Champions

Singles
- (Argentina) Alex Barrena

Doubles
- (Argentina) Mariano Kestelboim / (Argentina) Santiago Rodríguez Taverna
- Challenger de Buenos Aires

The 2026 Buenos Aires Challenger was a professional tennis tournament played on clay courts. It was the 15th edition of the tournament which was part of the 2026 ATP Challenger Tour. It took place in Buenos Aires, Argentina between 21 and 27 September 2026.

== Singles main-draw entrants ==
=== Seeds ===
Country	Player	Rank^{1}	Seed
ARG	Francisco Comesaña	127	1
BOL	Hugo Dellien	129	2
ESP	Pedro Martínez	132	3
BOL	Juan Carlos Prado Ángelo	153	4
~~PER~~	~~Gonzalo Bueno~~	~~172~~	~~5~~
PER	Juan Pablo Varillas	190	6
ARG	Alex Barrena	216	7
ARG	Facundo Mena	218	8

- ^{1} Rankings are as of 14 September 2026.

=== Other entrants ===
The following players received wildcards into the singles main draw:

- (Argentina) Federico Coria
- (Argentina) Valentín Garay
- (Argentina) Carlos María Zárate

The following player received entry into the singles main draw using a protected ranking:

- (Argentina) Renzo Olivo

The following players received entry into the singles main draw as alternates:

- (Argentina) Juan Pablo Ficovich
- (Argentina) Lucio Ratti

The following players received entry from the qualifying draw:

- (Argentina) Valerio Aboian
- (Uruguay) Joaquín Aguilar Cardozo
- (Argentina) Tomás Farjat
- (Argentina) Tomás Martínez
- (Argentina) Lorenzo Joaquín Rodríguez
- (Argentina) Santiago Rodríguez Taverna

The following player received entry as a lucky loser:

- (Brazil) Bruno Fernandez

== Champions ==
=== Singles ===
- (Argentina) Alex Barrena def. (Argentina) Facundo Mena 6–4, 6–0.

=== Doubles ===
- (Argentina) Mariano Kestelboim / (Argentina) Santiago Rodríguez Taverna def. (Bolivia) Murkel Dellien / (Bolivia) Federico Zeballos 6–4, 4–6, [10–5].
