= 2024 Challenger Ciudad de Guayaquil =

- Date: 28 October – 3 November
- Edition: 20th
- Surface: Clay
- Location: Guayaquil, Ecuador

Champions

Singles
- (Argentina) Federico Agustín Gómez

Doubles
- (Poland) Karol Drzewiecki / (Poland) Piotr Matuszewski
- Challenger Ciudad de Guayaquil

The 2024 Challenger Ciudad de Guayaquil was a professional tennis tournament played on clay courts. It was the 20th edition of the tournament which was part of the 2024 ATP Challenger Tour. It took place in Guayaquil, Ecuador between 28 October and 3 November 2024.

== Singles main-draw entrants ==
=== Seeds ===
Country	Player	Rank^{1}	Seed
ARG	Francisco Comesaña	97	1
ARG	Federico Coria	101	2
COL	Daniel Elahi Galán	113	3
ARG	Román Andrés Burruchaga	129	4
ARG	Marco Trungelliti	135	5
ARG	Juan Manuel Cerúndolo	149	6
CZE	Vít Kopřiva	150	7
ARG	Federico Agustín Gómez	157	8

- ^{1} Rankings are as of 21 October 2024.

=== Other entrants ===
The following players received wildcards into the singles main draw:

- (Ecuador) Francisco Castro
- (Ecuador) Marcos Lee Chan Baratau
- (Ecuador) Ángel Véliz

The following player received entry into the singles main draw using a protected ranking:

- (Argentina) Nicolás Kicker

The following players received entry into the singles main draw as alternates:

- (Portugal) Gastão Elias
- (Argentina) Renzo Olivo
- (Uruguay) Franco Roncadelli

The following players received entry from the qualifying draw:

- (Argentina) Alex Barrena
- (South Korea) Gerard Campaña Lee
- (France) Mathys Erhard
- (United States) Garrett Johns
- (Argentina) Mariano Kestelboim
- (Netherlands) Ryan Nijboer

== Champions ==
=== Singles ===
- (Argentina) Federico Agustín Gómez def. (Chile) Tomás Barrios Vera 6–1, 6–4.

=== Doubles ===
- (Poland) Karol Drzewiecki / (Poland) Piotr Matuszewski def. (Brazil) Luís Britto / (Brazil) Marcelo Zormann 6–4, 7–6^{(7–2)}.
