= 2022 Corrientes Challenger =

- Date: 13–19 June
- Edition: 2nd
- Surface: Clay
- Location: Corrientes, Argentina

Champions

Singles
- (Argentina) Francisco Comesaña

Doubles
- (Argentina) Guido Andreozzi / (Argentina) Guillermo Durán
← 2015 ·	Corrientes Challenger	· 2023 →

The 2022 Corrientes Challenger was a professional tennis tournament played on clay courts. It was the second edition of the tournament which was part of the 2022 ATP Challenger Tour. It took place in Corrientes, Argentina between 13 and 19 June 2022.

== Singles main-draw entrants ==
=== Seeds ===
Country	Player	Rank^{1}	Seed
ARG	Juan Pablo Ficovich	185	1
ARG	Francisco Comesaña	290	2
COL	Nicolás Mejía	292	3
ARG	Gonzalo Villanueva	302	4
DOM	Nick Hardt	339	5
TUN	Malek Jaziri	341	6
ARG	Facundo Juárez	358	7
PER	Nicolás Álvarez	369	8

- ^{1} Rankings are as of 6 June 2022.

=== Other entrants ===
The following players received wildcards into the singles main draw:

- (Argentina) Alex Barrena
- (Argentina) Lautaro Midón
- (Argentina) Luciano Tacchi

The following players received entry into the singles main draw as alternates:

- (Argentina) Ignacio Monzón
- (Peru) Jorge Panta
- (Argentina) Fermín Tenti

The following players received entry from the qualifying draw:

- (Argentina) Leonardo Aboian
- (Argentina) Guido Andreozzi
- (Argentina) Tomás Farjat
- (Argentina) Francisco Tomás Geschwind
- (Argentina) Mateo Nicolás Martínez
- (Japan) Naoki Nakagawa

== Champions ==
=== Singles ===
- (Argentina) Francisco Comesaña def. (Argentina) Mariano Navone 6–0, 6–3.

=== Doubles ===
- (Argentina) Guido Andreozzi / (Argentina) Guillermo Durán def. (Peru) Nicolás Álvarez / (Bolivia) Murkel Dellien 7–5, 6–2.
