= 2026 Open de Sion =

- Date: 17–22 August
- Edition: 1st
- Surface: Clay
- Location: Sion, Switzerland

Champions

Singles
- (Switzerland) Dominic Stricker

Doubles
- (Austria) Maximilian Neuchrist / (Czech Republic) David Poljak
- Open de Sion

The 2026 Open de Sion was a professional tennis tournament played on clay courts. It was the first edition of the tournament which was part of the 2026 ATP Challenger Tour. It took place in Sion, Switzerland between 17 and 22 August 2026.

== Singles main draw entrants ==
=== Seeds ===
Country	Player	Rank^{1}	Seed
ITA	Lorenzo Giustino	198	1
ARG	Juan Manuel La Serna	286	2
AUT	Sandro Kopp	289	3
FRA	Calvin Hemery	318	4
GER	Marvin Möller	319	5
SUI	Dominic Stricker	327	6
BOL	Murkel Dellien	328	7
ARG	Juan Estévez	329	8

- ^{1} Rankings as of 3 August 2026.

=== Other entrants ===
The following players received wildcards into the singles main draw:

- (Switzerland) Luca Stäheli
- (Switzerland) Dominic Stricker
- (Switzerland) Jeffrey von der Schulenburg

The following player received entry into the singles main draw through the College Accelerator programme:

- (Sweden) Max Dahlin

The following player received entry into the singles main draw as an alternate:

- (Netherlands) Ryan Nijboer

The following players received entry from the qualifying draw:

- (South Korea) Gerard Campaña Lee
- (Argentina) Thiago Cigarrán
- (Lebanon) Benjamin Hassan
- (Spain) Àlex Martí Pujolràs
- (Ukraine) Oleksandr Ovcharenko
- (Germany) Kai Wehnelt

The following player received entry as a lucky loser:

- (Germany) Luca Wiedenmann

== Champions ==
=== Singles ===
- (Switzerland) Dominic Stricker def. (Lebanon) Benjamin Hassan 6–1, 2–6, 6–2.

=== Doubles ===
- (Austria) Maximilian Neuchrist / (Czech Republic) David Poljak def. (Bolivia) Murkel Dellien / (Argentina) Facundo Mena 6–4, 6–4.
