= 2025 Open de Oeiras =

- Date: 14–20 April
- Edition: 12th
- Surface: Clay
- Location: Oeiras, Portugal

Champions

Singles
- (Denmark) Elmer Møller

Doubles
- (Poland) Karol Drzewiecki / (Poland) Piotr Matuszewski
← 2024 ·	Open de Oeiras	· 2025 →

The 2025 Open de Oeiras was a professional tennis tournament played on clay courts. It was the 12th edition of the tournament which was part of the 2025 ATP Challenger Tour. It took place in Oeiras, Portugal between 14 and 20 April 2025.

== Singles main-draw entrants ==
=== Seeds ===
Country	Player	Rank^{1}	Seed
ARG	Francisco Comesaña	61	1
	Roman Safiullin	68	2
BEL	Raphaël Collignon	91	3
BRA	Thiago Monteiro	94	4
~~USA~~	~~Nishesh Basavareddy~~	~~108~~	~~5~~
SRB	Dušan Lajović	109	6
BRA	Thiago Seyboth Wild	111	7
FRA	Valentin Royer	116	8

- ^{1} Rankings are as of 7 April 2025.

=== Other entrants ===
The following players received wildcards into the singles main draw:

- (Portugal) Pedro Araújo
- (Portugal) Gastão Elias
- (Portugal) Tiago Pereira

The following players received entry into the singles main draw as alternates:

- (United Kingdom) Jan Choinski
- (Italy) Matteo Gigante

The following players received entry from the qualifying draw:

- (Switzerland) Rémy Bertola
- (Argentina) Juan Manuel Cerúndolo
- (Netherlands) Guy den Ouden
- (Italy) Stefano Travaglia
- (Kazakhstan) Denis Yevseyev
- (Spain) Bernabé Zapata Miralles

The following player received entry as a lucky loser:

- (Spain) Alejandro Moro Cañas

== Champions ==
=== Singles ===
- (Denmark) Elmer Møller def. (Argentina) Francisco Comesaña 6–0, 6–4.

=== Doubles ===
- (Poland) Karol Drzewiecki / (Poland) Piotr Matuszewski def. (Portugal) Francisco Cabral / (Austria) Lucas Miedler 6–4, 3–6, [10–8].
