= 2026 Challenger de Buenos Aires – Doubles =

Doubles
- 2026 Challenger de Buenos Aires

Final
- Champions: (Argentina) Mariano Kestelboim (Argentina) Santiago Rodríguez Taverna
- Runners-up: (Bolivia) Murkel Dellien (Bolivia) Federico Zeballos
- Score: 6–4, 4–6, [10–5]

Events
Singles	Doubles
- Challenger de Buenos Aires

Guillermo Durán and Mariano Kestelboim were the defending champions but only Kestelboim chose to defend his title, partnering Santiago Rodríguez Taverna. He successfully defended his title after defeating Murkel Dellien and Federico Zeballos 6–4, 4–6, [10–5] in the final.

== Seeds ==
1. (Brazil) Eduardo Ribeiro / (Brazil) Marcelo Zormann (first round)
2. (Argentina) Mariano Kestelboim / (Argentina) Santiago Rodríguez Taverna (champions)
3. (Uruguay) Ignacio Carou / (Argentina) Facundo Mena (first round)
4. (Bolivia) Boris Arias / (Peru) Arklon Huertas del Pino (semifinals)

== Draw ==
Key

- Q = Qualifier
- WC = Wild card
- LL = Lucky loser
- Alt = Alternate
- ITF = ITF entry
- PR = Protected ranking
- SR = Special ranking
- SE = Special exempt
- JE = Junior exempt
- JR = Junior Accelerator Programme entrant
- CO = College Accelerator Programme entrant
- NG = Next Gen Accelerator Program entrant
- w/o = Walkover
- r = Retired
- d = Defaulted

First round
1	(Brazil) E Ribeiro (Brazil) M Zormann	6	5	[9]
(Uruguay) J Aguilar Cardozo (Argentina) S de la Fuente	4	7	[11]
WC	(Argentina) Tomás Martínez (Argentina) Ezequiel Monferrer	4	1
(Bolivia) M Dellien (Bolivia) F Zeballos	6	6
3	(Uruguay) I Carou (Argentina) F Mena	5	6	[7]
(Uruguay) F Roncadelli (Argentina) Carlos María Zárate	7	4	[10]
(Argentina) Mateo del Pino (Argentina) Lucio Ratti	4	6	[10]
(Argentina) Tomás Farjat (Argentina) Fermín Tenti	6	3	[6]
(Brazil) P Boscardin Dias (Argentina) G Villanueva	4	4
(Argentina) Nicolás Hollender (Argentina) Tadeo Meneo	6	6
WC	(Argentina) Valentín Garay (Argentina) Dante Pagani	4	2
4	(Bolivia) B Arias (Peru) A Huertas del Pino	6	6
Alt	(Chile) Nicolás Bruna (Italy) Lorenzo Gagliardo	1	1
(Brazil) Bruno Oliveira (Brazil) Natan Rodrigues	6	6
(Turkey) A Azkara (United States) Ryan Dickerson	7	4	[10]
2	(Argentina) M Kestelboim (Argentina) S Rodríguez Taverna	5	6	[12]

Quarterfinals
(Uruguay) J Aguilar Cardozo (Argentina) S de la Fuente
(Bolivia) M Dellien (Bolivia) F Zeballos	w/o
(Uruguay) F Roncadelli (Argentina) CM Zárate
(Argentina) M del Pino (Argentina) L Ratti	w/o
(Argentina) N Hollender (Argentina) T Meneo	6	5	[3]
4	(Bolivia) B Arias (Peru) A Huertas del Pino	4	7	[10]
(Brazil) B Oliveira (Brazil) N Rodrigues	6	1	[4]
2	(Argentina) M Kestelboim (Argentina) S Rodríguez Taverna	3	6	[10]

Semifinals
(Bolivia) M Dellien (Bolivia) F Zeballos	6	6
(Argentina) M del Pino (Argentina) L Ratti	2	3
4	(Bolivia) B Arias (Peru) A Huertas del Pino	6	2	[7]
2	(Argentina) M Kestelboim (Argentina) S Rodríguez Taverna	4	6	[10]

Final
(Bolivia) M Dellien (Bolivia) F Zeballos	4	6	[5]
2	(Argentina) M Kestelboim (Argentina) S Rodríguez Taverna	6	4	[10]
