= 2015 Corrientes Challenger =

Argentinian tennis tournament

- Date: 12–18 October
- Edition: 1st
- Surface: Clay
- Location: Corrientes, Argentina

Champions

Singles
- (Argentina) Máximo González

Doubles
- (Chile) Julio Peralta / (Argentina) Horacio Zeballos
Corrientes Challenger	· 2022 →

The 2015 Corrientes Challenger was a professional tennis tournament played on clay courts. It was the inaugural edition of the tournament which was part of the 2015 ATP Challenger Tour. It took place in Corrientes, Argentina between 12 and 18 October 2015.

== Singles main-draw entrants ==
=== Seeds ===
Country	Player	Rank^{1}	Seed
ARG	Diego Schwartzman	77	1
ARG	Guido Pella	77	2
ARG	Facundo Argüello	119	3
BEL	Kimmer Coppejans	136	4
ARG	Facundo Bagnis	147	5
ARG	Horacio Zeballos	149	6
ARG	Carlos Berlocq	151	7
ARG	Máximo González	154	8

- ^{1} Rankings are as of October 12, 2015.

=== Other entrants ===
The following players received wildcards into the singles main draw:

- (Argentina) Hernán Casanova
- (Argentina) Juan Pablo Paz
- (Argentina) Manuel Peña López
- (Argentina) Agustín Velotti

The following player received entry into the singles main draw with a protected ranking:

- (Portugal) Pedro Sousa

The following players received entry from the qualifying draw:

- (Argentina) Franco Agamenone
- (Uruguay) Martín Cuevas
- (Belgium) Joris De Loore
- (Japan) Ryusei Makiguchi

== Champions ==
=== Singles ===
- (Argentina) Máximo González def. (Argentina) Diego Schwartzman 3–6, 7–5, 6–4

=== Doubles ===
- (Chile) Julio Peralta / (Argentina) Horacio Zeballos def. (Argentina) Guillermo Durán / (Argentina) Máximo González 6–3, 6–3.
