= 2022 Corrientes Challenger – Doubles =

Doubles
- 2022 Corrientes Challenger

Final
- Champions: (Argentina) Guido Andreozzi (Argentina) Guillermo Durán
- Runners-up: (Peru) Nicolás Álvarez (Bolivia) Murkel Dellien
- Score: 7–5, 6–2

Events
| Singles | Doubles |
- Corrientes Challenger

Julio Peralta and Horacio Zeballos were the defending champions when the event was last held in 2015, but they chose not to defend their title.

Guido Andreozzi and Guillermo Durán won the title after defeating Nicolás Álvarez and Murkel Dellien 7–5, 6–2 in the final.

== Seeds ==
1. (Argentina) Guido Andreozzi / (Argentina) Guillermo Durán (champions)
2. (Peru) Arklon Huertas del Pino / (Peru) Conner Huertas del Pino (semifinals)
3. (Argentina) Román Andrés Burruchaga / (Argentina) Francisco Comesaña (semifinals)
4. (Brazil) Gustavo Heide / (Brazil) João Lucas Reis da Silva (withdrew)

== Draw ==
Key

- Q = Qualifier
- WC = Wild card
- LL = Lucky loser
- Alt = Alternate
- ITF = ITF entry
- PR = Protected ranking
- SR = Special ranking
- SE = Special exempt
- JE = Junior exempt
- JR = Junior Accelerator Programme entrant
- CO = College Accelerator Programme entrant
- NG = Next Gen Accelerator Program entrant
- w/o = Walkover
- r = Retired
- d = Defaulted

First round
(United Kingdom) Blu Baker (Colombia) N Mejía | 6 | 3 | [11]
(Argentina) M Navone (Argentina) Fermín Tenti | 3 | 6 | [9]
3 | (Argentina) RA Burruchaga (Argentina) F Comesaña | 5 | 6 | [10]
(Argentina) A Barrena (Brazil) Wilson Leite | 7 | 4 | [5]
(Argentina) Mateo Nicolás Martínez (Peru) J Panta | 6 | 3 | [8]
(Argentina) MF Descotte (Argentina) G Villanueva | 3 | 6 | [10]
(Peru) N Álvarez (Bolivia) M Dellien | 6 | 6
(Argentina) AL Lingua Lavallén (Argentina) Luciano Tacchi | 3 | 4
(Argentina) Leonardo Aboian (Argentina) V Aboian | 6 | 5 | [6]
Alt | (Spain) C Gómez-Herrera (Tunisia) M Jaziri | 2 | 7 | [10]
WC | (Dominican Republic) N Hardt (Argentina) Valentín Velázquez | 4 | 2
WC | (Argentina) L Mayer (Argentina) Ignacio Monzón | 6 | 6
(Argentina) S de la Fuente (Argentina) Facundo Juárez | 4 | 6 | [5]
2 | (Peru) A Huertas del Pino (Peru) C Huertas del Pino | 6 | 4 | [10]

Quarterfinals
1 | (Argentina) G Andreozzi (Argentina) G Durán | 6 | 6
(United Kingdom) B Baker (Colombia) N Mejía | 3 | 3
3 | (Argentina) RA Burruchaga (Argentina) F Comesaña | 6 | 6
(Argentina) MF Descotte (Argentina) G Villanueva | 3 | 0
(Peru) N Álvarez (Bolivia) M Dellien | 6 | 6
Alt | (Spain) C Gómez-Herrera (Tunisia) M Jaziri | 1 | 2
WC | (Argentina) L Mayer (Argentina) I Monzón | 1 | 6^{5}
2 | (Peru) A Huertas del Pino (Peru) C Huertas del Pino | 6 | 7^{7}

Semifinals
1 | (Argentina) G Andreozzi (Argentina) G Durán | 6 | 6
3 | (Argentina) RA Burruchaga (Argentina) F Comesaña | 4 | 0
(Peru) N Álvarez (Bolivia) M Dellien | 7^{7} | 6
2 | (Peru) A Huertas del Pino (Peru) C Huertas del Pino | 6^{4} | 1

Final
1 | (Argentina) G Andreozzi (Argentina) G Durán | 7 | 6
(Peru) N Álvarez (Bolivia) M Dellien | 5 | 2
