= 2024 Challenger de Buenos Aires – Doubles =

Doubles
- 2024 Challenger de Buenos Aires

Final
- Champions: (Bolivia) Murkel Dellien (Argentina) Facundo Mena
- Runners-up: (Brazil) Felipe Meligeni Alves (Brazil) Marcelo Zormann
- Score: 1–6, 6–2, [12–10]

Events
| Singles | Doubles |
- Challenger de Buenos Aires

Diego Hidalgo and Cristian Rodríguez were the defending champions but chose not to defend their title.

Murkel Dellien and Facundo Mena won the title after defeating Felipe Meligeni Alves and Marcelo Zormann 1–6, 6–2, [12–10] in the final.

== Seeds ==
1. (Bolivia) Boris Arias / (Bolivia) Federico Zeballos (first round)
2. (Argentina) Guido Andreozzi / (Argentina) Mariano Kestelboim (quarterfinals)
3. (Argentina) Federico Agustín Gómez / (Venezuela) Luis David Martínez (quarterfinals)
4. (Brazil) Mateus Alves / (Brazil) Orlando Luz (first round)

== Draw ==
Key

- Q = Qualifier
- WC = Wild card
- LL = Lucky loser
- Alt = Alternate
- ITF = ITF entry
- PR = Protected ranking
- SR = Special ranking
- SE = Special exempt
- JE = Junior exempt
- JR = Junior Accelerator Programme entrant
- CO = College Accelerator Programme entrant
- NG = Next Gen Accelerator Program entrant
- w/o = Walkover
- r = Retired
- d = Defaulted

=== Draw ===
First round
1 | (Bolivia) B Arias (Bolivia) F Zeballos | 1 | 6^{7}
(Argentina) GA Olivieri (Argentina) C Ugo Carabelli | 6 | 7^{9}
(Lebanon) H Habib (Kazakhstan) D Popko | 7^{7} | 4 | [8]
(United Kingdom) S Duncan (United States) H Reese | 6^{4} | 6 | [10]
3 | (Argentina) FA Gómez (Venezuela) LD Martínez | 6 | 6
WC | (Argentina) LE Ambrogi (Argentina) Mateo del Pino | 1 | 2
(Brazil) G Heide (Brazil) JL Reis da Silva | 3 | 2
(Bolivia) M Dellien (Argentina) F Mena | 6 | 6
WC | (Argentina) Leonardo Aboian (Argentina) V Aboian | 7 | 6
(Peru) G Bueno (Ecuador) Á Guillén Meza | 5 | 1
(Brazil) F Meligeni Alves (Brazil) M Zormann | 3 | 6 | [11]
4 | (Brazil) M Alves (Brazil) O Luz | 6 | 1 | [9]
PR | (Peru) A Huertas del Pino (Peru) C Huertas del Pino | 4 | 6 | [6]
(Uruguay) I Carou (Bolivia) H Dellien | 6 | 3 | [10]
(Argentina) A Collarini (Argentina) R Olivo | 4 | 4
2 | (Argentina) G Andreozzi (Argentina) M Kestelboim | 6 | 6

Quarterfinals
(Argentina) GA Olivieri (Argentina) C Ugo Carabelli | 5 | 6 | [10]
(United Kingdom) S Duncan (United States) H Reese | 7 | 4 | [4]
3 | (Argentina) FA Gómez (Venezuela) LD Martínez | 3 | 2
(Bolivia) M Dellien (Argentina) F Mena | 6 | 6
WC | (Argentina) L Aboian (Argentina) V Aboian | 4 | 1
(Brazil) F Meligeni Alves (Brazil) M Zormann | 6 | 6
(Uruguay) I Carou (Bolivia) H Dellien | 6 | 2 | [10]
2 | (Argentina) G Andreozzi (Argentina) M Kestelboim | 3 | 6 | [7]

Semifinals
(Argentina) GA Olivieri (Argentina) C Ugo Carabelli | 3 | 6^{7}
(Bolivia) M Dellien (Argentina) F Mena | 6 | 7^{9}
(Brazil) F Meligeni Alves (Brazil) M Zormann | 6 | 6
(Uruguay) I Carou (Bolivia) H Dellien | 1 | 2

Final
(Bolivia) M Dellien (Argentina) F Mena | 1 | 6 | [12]
(Brazil) F Meligeni Alves (Brazil) M Zormann | 6 | 2 | [10]
