= 2026 Ion Țiriac Challenger =

- Date: 29 June – 5 July
- Edition: 3rd
- Surface: Clay
- Location: Brașov, Romania

Champions

Singles
- (Hungary) Zsombor Piros

Doubles
- (Austria) Maximilian Neuchrist / (Czech Republic) Michael Vrbenský
- Ion Țiriac Challenger

The 2026 Ion Țiriac Challenger was a professional tennis tournament played on clay courts. It was the third edition of the tournament which was part of the 2026 ATP Challenger Tour. It took place in Brașov, Romania between 29 June and 5 July 2026.

== Singles main-draw entrants ==
=== Seeds ===
Country	Player	Rank^{1}	Seed
ITA	Francesco Maestrelli	128	1
HUN	Zsombor Piros	172	2
ITA	Federico Cinà	180	3
FRA	Harold Mayot	201	4
BEL	Gilles-Arnaud Bailly	208	5
FRA	Luka Pavlovic	218	6
LTU	Edas Butvilas	226	7
ARG	Lautaro Midón	227	8

- ^{1} Rankings are as of 22 June 2026.

=== Other entrants ===
The following players received wildcards into the singles main draw:

- (Romania) Cezar Crețu
- (Romania) Ștefan Horia Haita
- (Romania) Ștefan Paloși

The following player received entry into the singles main draw through the Junior Accelerator programme:

- (Spain) Andrés Santamarta Roig

The following player received entry into the singles main draw through the Next Gen Accelerator programme:

- (Serbia) Ognjen Milić

The following player received entry into the singles main draw as an alternate:

- (Poland) Maks Kaśnikowski

The following players received entry from the qualifying draw:

- (Moldova) Radu Albot
- (Romania) Gabriel Ghețu
- (Bulgaria) Dimitar Kuzmanov
- (Japan) Akira Santillan
- Ilia Simakin
- (Sweden) Olle Wallin

The following players received entry as lucky losers:

- (Romania) Sebastian Gima
- (Kazakhstan) Denis Yevseyev

== Champions ==
=== Singles ===
- (Hungary) Zsombor Piros def. (United States) Keegan Smith 6–4, 6–4.

=== Doubles ===
- (Austria) Maximilian Neuchrist / (Czech Republic) Michael Vrbenský def. (Spain) Íñigo Cervantes / (Ukraine) Denys Molchanov 6–3, 3–6, [10–4].
