= 2025 Open de Oeiras – Singles =

Singles
- 2025 Open de Oeiras

Final
- Champion: (Denmark) Elmer Møller
- Runner-up: (Argentina) Francisco Comesaña
- Score: 6–0, 6–4

Events
Singles	Doubles
← 2024 ·	Open de Oeiras	· 2025 →

Jaime Faria was the defending champion but chose not to defend his title.

Elmer Møller won the title after defeating Francisco Comesaña 6–0, 6–4 in the final.

== Seeds ==
1. (Argentina) Francisco Comesaña (final)
2. Roman Safiullin (semifinals)
3. (Belgium) Raphaël Collignon (quarterfinals)
4. (Brazil) Thiago Monteiro (first round)
5. (United States) Nishesh Basavareddy (withdrew)
6. (Serbia) Dušan Lajović (quarterfinals, retired)
7. (Brazil) Thiago Seyboth Wild (first round)
8. (France) Valentin Royer (second round)

== Draw ==
Key

- Q = Qualifier
- WC = Wild card
- LL = Lucky loser
- Alt = Alternate
- ITF = ITF entry
- PR = Protected ranking
- SR = Special ranking
- SE = Special exempt
- JE = Junior exempt
- JR = Junior Accelerator Programme entrant
- CO = College Accelerator Programme entrant
- NG = Next Gen Accelerator Program entrant
- w/o = Walkover
- r = Retired
- d = Defaulted

=== Finals ===
Semifinals
1	(Argentina) Francisco Comesaña	6	6
(Spain) Carlos Taberner	1	2
(Denmark) Elmer Møller	6	6
2	Roman Safiullin	2	4

Final
1	(Argentina) Francisco Comesaña	0	4
(Denmark) Elmer Møller	6	6

=== Top half ===
First round
1	(Argentina) F Comesaña	4	6	6
WC	(Portugal) G Elias	6	3	2
(United States) T Boyer	6	1	6
Q	(Kazakhstan) D Yevseyev	1	6	4
(France) G Barrère	6	7
(France) L Van Assche	4	5
(Slovakia) L Klein	4	2
Q	(Italy) S Travaglia	6	6
3	(Belgium) R Collignon	6	6
(Switzerland) J Kym	2	2
Q	(Netherlands) G den Ouden	7	4	7^{7}
Q	(Spain) B Zapata Miralles	5	6	6^{5}
(Spain) C Taberner	6	7^{7}
(Norway) N Budkov Kjær	3	6^{4}
(Japan) S Mochizuki	2	6	7
7	(Brazil) T Seyboth Wild	6	1	5

Second round
1	(Argentina) F Comesaña	7	7^{7}
(United States) T Boyer	5	6^{4}
(France) G Barrère	6	7^{14}
Q	(Italy) S Travaglia	4	6^{12}
3	(Belgium) R Collignon	6	7^{7}
Q	(Netherlands) G den Ouden	4	6^{2}
(Spain) C Taberner	7	6
(Japan) S Mochizuki	5	3

Quarterfinals
1	(Argentina) F Comesaña	7	6
(France) G Barrère	5	4
3	(Belgium) R Collignon	6^{4}	6^{5}
(Spain) C Taberner	7^{7}	7^{7}

Semifinals
1	(Argentina) F Comesaña	6	6
(Spain) C Taberner	1	2

=== Bottom half ===
First round
8	(France) V Royer	0	7^{7}	6
Q	(Argentina) JM Cerúndolo	6	6^{5}	2
WC	(Portugal) Pedro Araújo	3	1
Q	(Switzerland) R Bertola	6	6
(Kazakhstan) M Kukushkin	6	6
Alt	(Italy) M Gigante	4	4
(Denmark) E Møller	6	6^{2}	6
4	(Brazil) T Monteiro	3	7^{7}	1
6	(Serbia) D Lajović	6	7^{7}
WC	(Portugal) T Pereira	2	6^{0}
(France) U Blanchet	6	6
Alt	(United Kingdom) J Choinski	1	3
LL	(Spain) A Moro Cañas	6	7^{10}
(Portugal) H Rocha	4	6^{8}
(Belgium) A Blockx	4	3
2	R Safiullin	6	6

Second round
8	(France) V Royer	6^{3}	3
Q	(Switzerland) R Bertola	7^{7}	6
(Kazakhstan) M Kukushkin
(Denmark) E Møller	w/o
6	(Serbia) D Lajović	6	6
(France) U Blanchet	4	2
LL	(Spain) A Moro Cañas	7	5	6^{8}
2	R Safiullin	5	7	7^{10}

Quarterfinals
Q	(Switzerland) R Bertola	1	6^{5}
(Denmark) E Møller	6	7^{7}
6	(Serbia) D Lajović	4	0^{r}
2	R Safiullin	6	3

Semifinals
(Denmark) E Møller	6	6
2	R Safiullin	2	4
