= Karol Drzewiecki =

Polish tennis player

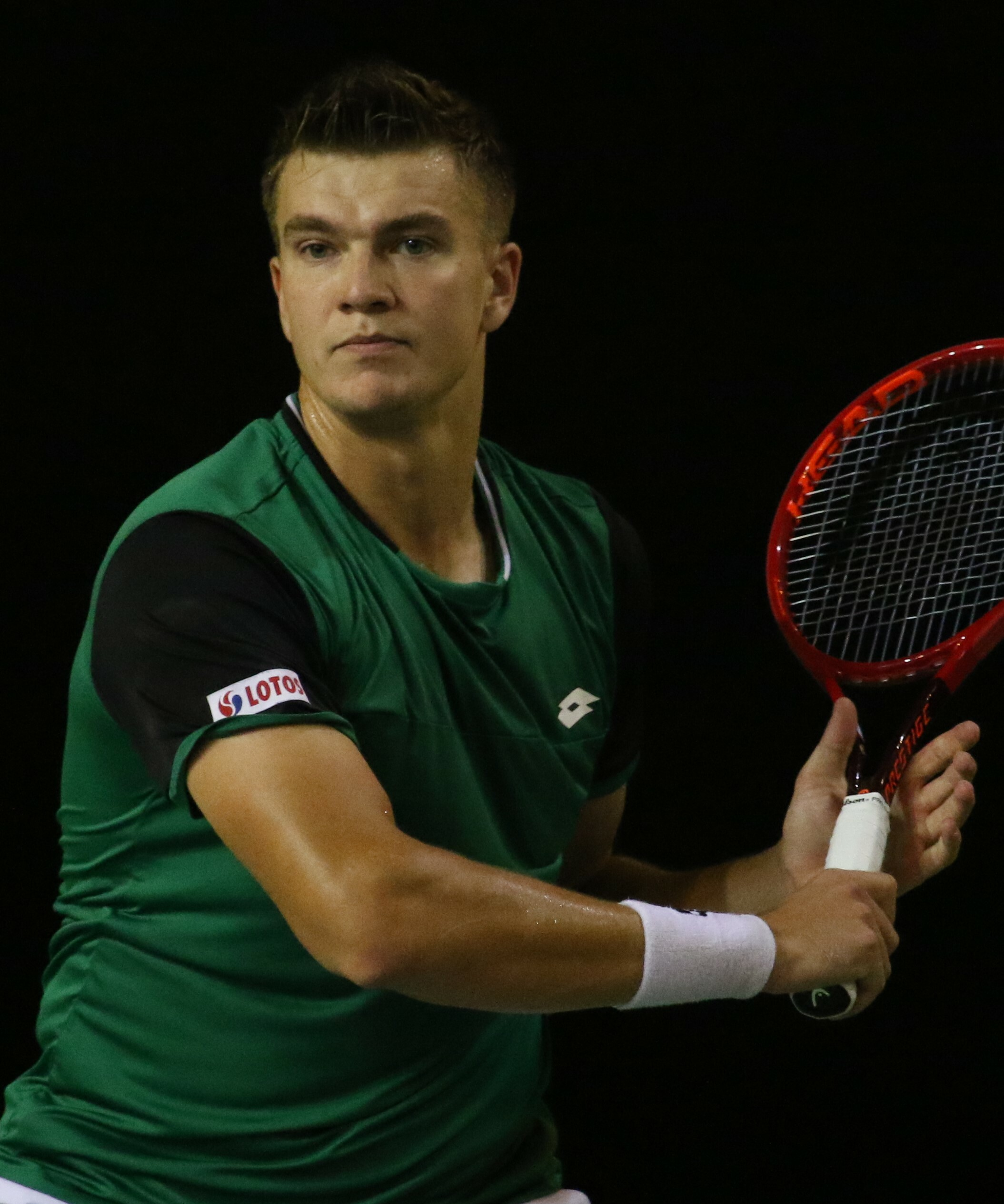
- Drzewiecki at the 2021 Internationaux de Tennis de Vendée
- Country (sports): Poland
- Residence: Poznań, Poland
- Born: 1 November 1995 (age 31) Gorzów Wielkopolski, Poland
- Height: 1.91 m (6 ft 3 in)
- Plays: Right-handed (two-handed backhand)
- Coach: Wojciech Owsiak
- Prize money: US $305,162

Singles
- Career record: 0-0
- Career titles: 0
- Highest ranking: No. 820 (3 December 2018)

Doubles
- Career record: 9–13
- Career titles: 15 Challenger, 11 Futures
- Highest ranking: No. 74 (8 September 2025)
- Current ranking: No. 94 (29 June 2026)

Grand Slam doubles results
- Australian Open: 1R (2025)
- French Open: 1R (2025)
- Wimbledon: 1R (2025, 2026)
- US Open: 3R (2025)
- Last updated on: 30 June 2026.

Karol Drzewiecki (Polish pronunciation: [ˈkarɔl dʐɛˈvjɛtskʲi]; born 1 November 1995) is a Polish professional tennis player who specializes in doubles. He has a career-high ATP singles ranking of No. 820 achieved on 3 December 2018 and a doubles ranking of world No. 74 on 8 September 2025. Drzewiecki has won 12 ATP Challenger doubles titles.

== ATP Challenger and ITF Tour finals ==
=== Singles: 1 (1–0) ===
Legend ATP Challenger (0–0) ITF Futures (1–0)	Finals by surface Hard (1–0) Clay (0–0)

Result	W–L	Date	Tournament	Tier	Surface	Opponent	Score
Win	1–0	Nov 2018	Czech Republic F9, Valašské Meziříčí	Futures	Hard	(Czech Republic) Jonáš Forejtek	6–3, 6–4

=== Doubles: 66 (27–39) ===
Legend ATP Challenger (16–29) ITF Futures (11–10)	Finals by surface Hard (11–13) Clay (13–25) Carpet (3–1)

Result	W–L	Date	Category	Tournament	Surface	Partner	Opponents	Score
Win	1–0	Mar 2015	Futures	Egypt F9, Sharm El Sheikh	Hard	(Poland) Maciej Smoła	(Spain) Íñigo Cervantes (Netherlands) Mark Vervoort	6–3, 4–6, [10–4]
Loss	1–1	Jun 2015	Futures	Georgia F5, Pantiani	Clay	(Poland) Jan Zieliński	(Italy) Marco Bortolotti (Italy) Francesco Moncagatto	3–6, 2–6
Win	2–1	Aug 2015	Futures	Poland F2, Bydgoszcz	Clay	(Poland) Maciej Smoła	(Brazil) Eduardo Dischinger (Brazil) Bruno Sant'Anna	7–6^{(7–4)}, 5–7, [10–8]
Win	3–1	Sep 2015	Futures	Poland F5, Wrocław	Hard	(Poland) Maciej Smoła	(United States) Tim Kopinski (United States) Konrad Zieba	6–2, 6–7^{(3–7)}, [10–5]
Loss	3–2	Oct 2015	Futures	Egypt F34, Sharm El Sheikh	Hard	(Poland) Maciej Smoła	(United Kingdom) Scott Clayton (United Kingdom) Jonny O'mara	6–7^{(8–10)}, 1–6
Loss	3–3	Nov 2015	Futures	Egypt F41, Sharm El Sheikh	Hard	(Poland) Maciej Smoła	(Ukraine) Vladyslav Manafov (Georgia (country)) George Tsivadze	2–6, 3–6
Win	4–3	Nov 2015	Futures	Egypt F42, Sharm El Sheikh	Hard	(Poland) Maciej Smoła	(Poland) Kamil Gajewski (Poland) Mikołaj Jędruszczak	7–5, 6–1
Win	5–3	Apr 2016	Futures	Greece F5, Heraklion	Hard	(Brazil) Bruno Sant'Anna	(Ukraine) Vladyslav Manafov (Australia) Bradley Mousley	7–6^{(7–3)}, 2–6, [10–7]
Loss	5–4	Oct 2016	Futures	Nigeria F6, Lagos	Hard	(Poland) Maciej Smoła	(Spain) Alejandro Davidovich Fokina (Benin) Alexis Klegou	4–6, 1–6
Loss	5–5	Dec 2016	Futures	Indonesia F6, Jakarta	Hard	(Poland) Maciej Smoła	(Indonesia) Justin Barki (Indonesia) Christopher Rungkat	4–6, 4–6
Loss	5–6	Jul 2017	Futures	Poland F3, Mrągowo	Clay	(Poland) Maciej Smoła	(Italy) Antonio Massara (Czech Republic) David Poljak	2–6, 4–6
Loss	5–7	Aug 2017	Futures	Poland F9, Bydgoszcz	Clay	(Poland) Maciej Smoła	(Poland) Michał Dembek (Poland) Hubert Hurkacz	2–6, 7–6^{(11–9)}, [6–10]
Win	6–7	Nov 2017	Futures	Czech Republic F8, Opava	Carpet	(Poland) Maciej Smoła	(Poland) Mateusz Kowalczyk (Poland) Szymon Walków	7–6^{(7–4)},6–7^{(4–7)}, [10–8]
Win	7–7	Nov 2017	Futures	Czech Republic F10, Říčany	Hard	(Poland) Szymon Walków	(Czech Republic) Matěj Vocel (Czech Republic) Michael Vrbenský	3–6, 6–2, [10–8]
Loss	7–8	Nov 2017	Futures	Egypt F36, Cairo	Hard	(Poland) Szymon Walków	(Brazil) Jordan Correia (Spain) Mario Vilella Martinez	6–7^{(11–13)}, 6–7^{(4–7)}
Win	8–8	Aug 2018	Futures	Poland F7, Bydgoszcz	Clay	(Poland) Mateusz Kowalczyk	(Poland) Michał Mikuła (Poland) Yann Wojcik	7–6^{(7–3)}, 6–4
Loss	8–9	Aug 2018	Futures	Poland F8, Poznań	Clay	(Poland) Mateusz Kowalczyk	(Poland) Tomasz Bednarek (Poland) Szymon Walków	4–6, 3–6
Win	9–9	Sep 2018	Challenger	Szczecin, Poland	Clay	(Slovakia) Filip Polášek	(Argentina) Guido Andreozzi (Argentina) Guillermo Durán	6–3, 6–4
Loss	9–10	Oct 2018	Futures	Czech Republic F8, Opava	Carpet	(Poland) Szymon Walków	(Czech Republic) Vít Kopřiva (Czech Republic) Jaroslav Pospíšil	6–7^{(5–7)}, 4–6
Win	10–10	Nov 2018	Futures	Czech Republic F9, Valašské Meziříčí	Hard	(Czech Republic) Petr Nouza	(Netherlands) Niels Lootsma (Netherlands) Glenn Smits	6–2, 6–1
Win	11–10	Nov 2018	Futures	Czech Republic F10, Milovice	Hard	(Poland) Szymon Walków	(Czech Republic) Dominik Langmajer (Czech Republic) Daniel Lustig	5–7, 7–6^{(9–7)}, [15–13]
Win	12–10	Nov 2018	Challenger	Andria, Italy	Carpet	(Poland) Szymon Walków	(Switzerland) Marc-Andrea Hüsler (Netherlands) David Pel	7–6^{(12–10)}, 2–6, [11–9]
Win	13–10	Jan 2019	World Tennis Tour	M25 Nussloch, Germany	Carpet	(Poland) Szymon Walków	(Czech Republic) Marek Gengel (Ukraine) Danylo Kalenichenko	7–5, 6–3
Loss	13–11	Jul 2019	Challenger	Sopot, Poland	Clay	(Poland) Mateusz Kowalczyk	(Germany) Andre Begemann (Romania) Florin Mergea	1–6, 6–3, [8–10]
Loss	13–12	Sep 2019	Challenger	Mallorca, Spain	Hard	(Poland) Szymon Walków	(Netherlands) Sander Arends (Netherlands) David Pel	5–7, 4–6
Loss	13–13	Sep 2019	Challenger	Nur-Sultan, Kazakhstan	Hard (i)	(Poland) Szymon Walków	(Finland) Harri Heliövaara (Ukraine) Illya Marchenko	4–6, 4–6
Win	14–13	Mar 2020	Challenger	Monterrey, Mexico	Hard	(Portugal) Gonçalo Oliveira	(Brazil) Orlando Luz (Brazil) Rafael Matos	6–7^{(5–7)}, 6–4, [11–9]
Loss	14–14	Aug 2020	Challenger	Ostrava, Czech Republic	Clay	(Poland) Szymon Walków	(New Zealand) Artem Sitak (Slovakia) Igor Zelenay	5–7, 4–6
Loss	14–15	May 2021	Challenger	Biella, Italy	Clay	(Spain) Sergio Martos Gornés	(United States) Evan King (Germany) Julian Lenz	6–3, 3–6, [9–11]
Loss	14–16	Jul 2021	Challenger	Poznań, Poland	Clay	(Australia) Aleksandar Vukic	(Czech Republic) Zdeněk Kolář (Czech Republic) Jiří Lehečka	4–6, 6–3, [5–10]
Win	15–16	Sep 2021	Challenger	Mallorca, Spain	Hard	(Spain) Sergio Martos Gornés	(Brazil) Fernando Romboli (Poland) Jan Zieliński	6–4, 4–6, [10–3]
Loss	15–17	Feb 2022	Challenger	Tampere, Finland	Hard (i)	(Poland) Kacper Żuk	(France) Albano Olivetti (Spain) David Vega Hernández	walkover
Loss	15–18	Jul 2022	Challenger	Tampere, Finland	Clay	(Finland) Patrik Niklas-Salminen	(Austria) Alexander Erler (Austria) Lucas Miedler	6–7^{(3–7)}, 1–6
Loss	15–19	Jul 2022	Challenger	Zug, Switzerland	Clay	(Finland) Patrik Niklas-Salminen	(Czech Republic) Zdeněk Kolář (Czech Republic) Adam Pavlásek	3–6, 5–7
Loss	15–20	Oct 2022	Challenger	Rio de Janeiro, Brazil	Clay	(Switzerland) Jakub Paul	(Argentina) Guido Andreozzi (Argentina) Guillermo Durán	3–6, 2–6
Loss	15–21	Oct 2022	Challenger	Coquimbo, Chile	Clay	(Switzerland) Jakub Paul	(Italy) Franco Agamenone (Argentina) Hernán Casanova	3–6, 4–6
Win	16–21	Nov 2022	Challenger	Montevideo, Uruguay	Clay	(Poland) Piotr Matuszewski	(Argentina) Facundo Díaz Acosta (Venezuela) Luis David Martínez	6–4, 6–4
Loss	16–22	Feb 2023	Challenger	Cherbourg-Octeville, France	Hard (i)	(Poland) Kacper Żuk	Ivan Liutarevich (Ukraine) Vladyslav Manafov	6–7^{(10–12)}, 6–7^{(7–9)}
Win	17–22	Jun 2023	Challenger	Poznań, Poland	Clay	(Czech Republic) Petr Nouza	(Uruguay) Ariel Behar (Czech Republic) Adam Pavlásek	7–6^{(7–2)}, 7–6^{(7–2)}
Win	18–22	Oct 2023	Challenger	Lisbon, Portugal	Clay	(Czech Republic) Zdenek Kolar	(Portugal) Jaime Faria (Portugal) Henrique Rocha	6–2, 7–6 ^{(7–5)}
Win	19–22	Nov 2023	Challenger	Matsuyama, Japan	Hard	(Czech Republic) Zdenek Kolar	(Japan) Toshihide Matsui (Japan) Kaito Uesugi	6–3, 6–2
Win	20–22	Jan 2024	Challenger	Oeiras, Portugal	Hard (i)	(Poland) Piotr Matuszewski	(India) Arjun Kadhe (United Kingdom) Marcus Willis	6–3, 6–4
Loss	20–23	Jan 2024	Challenger	Tenerife, Spain	Hard	(Poland) Piotr Matuszewski	(United States) Vasil Kirkov (Venezuela) Luis David Martínez	6–3, 4–6, [3–10]
Loss	20–24	Mar 2024	Challenger	Hamburg, Germany	Hard	(Finland) Patrik Niklas-Salminen	(Switzerland) Rémy Bertola (Italy) Mattia Bellucci	4–6, 5–7
Loss	20–25	Jul 2024	Challenger	Brașov, Romania	Clay	(Poland) Piotr Matuszewski	(Spain) Javier Barranco Cosano (United States) Nicolas Moreno de Alboran	6–3, 1–6, [15–17]
Loss	20–26	Jul 2024	Challenger	Iași, Romania	Clay	(Poland) Piotr Matuszewski	(Romania) Cezar Crețu (Romania) Bogdan Pavel	6–2, 2–6, [4–10]
Loss	20–27	Sep 2024	Challenger	Tulln, Austria	Clay	(Poland) Piotr Matuszewski	(Slovakia) Miloš Karol (Ukraine) Vitaliy Sachko	4–6, 6–2, [9–11]
Loss	20–28	Oct 2024	Challenger	Valencia, Spain	Clay	(Poland) Piotr Matuszewski	(Peru) Alexander Merino (Germany) Christoph Negritu	3–6, 4–6
Loss	20–29	Oct 2024	Challenger	Curitiba, Brazil	Clay	(Poland) Piotr Matuszewski	(Brazil) Fernando Romboli (Chile) Matías Soto	6–7 ^{(5–7)}, 6–7 ^{(4–7)}
Win	21–29	Oct 2024	Challenger	Guayaquil, Ecuador	Clay	(Poland) Piotr Matuszewski	(Brazil) Luís Britto (Brazil) Marcelo Zormann	6–4, 7–6 ^{(7–2)}
Win	22–29	Nov 2024	Challenger	Lima II, Peru	Clay	(Poland) Piotr Matuszewski	(Brazil) Luís Britto (Brazil) Gustavo Heide	7–5, 6–4
Win	23–29	Nov 2024	Challenger	Montemar, Spain	Clay	(Poland) Piotr Matuszewski	(Spain) Daniel Rincón (Jordan) Abdullah Shelbayh	6–3, 6–4
Loss	23–30	Feb 2025	Challenger	Lille, France	Hard (i)	(Poland) Piotr Matuszewski	(Switzerland) Jakub Paul (Netherlands) David Pel	3–6, 4–6
Win	24–30	Mar 2025	Challenger	Córdoba, Argentina	Clay	(Poland) Piotr Matuszewski	(Brazil) Fernando Romboli (Chile) Matías Soto	6–4, 6–4
Win	25–30	Apr 2025	Challenger	Oeiras, Portugal	Clay	(Poland) Piotr Matuszewski	(Portugal) Francisco Cabral (Austria) Lucas Miedler	6–4, 3–6, [10–8]
Win	26–30	Jul 2025	Challenger	City of San Marino, San Marino	Clay	(Chinese Taipei) Ray Ho	(Slovakia) Miloš Karol (Ukraine) Vitaliy Sachko	7–5, 7–6^{(7–3)}
Loss	26–31	Mar 2026	Challenger	Cherbourg-en-Cotentin, France	Hard (i)	(Poland) Szymon Walków	(Canada) Cleeve Harper (United Kingdom) David Stevenson	6–4, 3–6, [8–10]
Loss	26–32	Mar 2026	Challenger	Murcia, Spain	Clay	(Poland) Piotr Matuszewski	(Lebanon) Benjamin Hassan (Austria) Sebastian Ofner	3–6, 4–6
Loss	26–33	Apr 2026	Challenger	Ostrava, Czech Republic	Clay	(Poland) Piotr Matuszewski	(Spain) Sergio Martos Gornés (Poland) Szymon Walków	7–6^{(7–3)}, 5–7, [8–10]
Win	27–33	Jun 2026	Challenger	Bratislava, Slovakia	Clay	(Poland) Piotr Matuszewski	(Slovakia) Lukáš Pokorný (Ukraine) Vitaliy Sachko	6–4, 7–5
Loss	27–34	Jun 2026	Challenger	Poznań, Poland	Clay	(Poland) Piotr Matuszewski	(Spain) Sergio Martos Gornés (Poland) Szymon Walków	3–6, 5–7
Loss	27–35	Aug 2026	Challenger	Como, Italy	Clay	(Poland) Piotr Matuszewski	(Croatia) Admir Kalender (Croatia) Nino Serdarušić	3–6, 4–6
Loss	27–36	Oct 2026	Challenger	Braga, Portugal	Clay	(Croatia) Admir Kalender	(Morocco) Younes Lalami (Spain) Mario Mansilla Díez	3–6, 6–2, [14–16]
Loss	27–37	Oct 2026	Challenger	Lisbon, Portugal	Clay	(Poland) Piotr Matuszewski	(Portugal) Tiago Pereira (Spain) Benjamín Winter López	6–4, 3–6, [5–10]
Loss	27–38	Oct 2026	Challenger	Guayaquil, Ecuador	Clay	(Poland) Piotr Matuszewski	(Ecuador) Diego Hidalgo (Argentina) Mariano Kestelboim	5–7, 7–6^{(7–4)}, [7–10]
Loss	27–39	Nov 2026	Challenger	Lima, Peru	Clay	(Poland) Piotr Matuszewski	(Argentina) Facundo Bagnis (Argentina) Facundo Mena	6–4, 4–6, [3–10]
