= Open de Sion =

- 2026 Open de Sion

ATP Challenger Tour
- Location: Sion, Switzerland
- Category: ATP Challenger Tour
- Surface: Clay

The Open de Sion is a professional tennis tournament played on clay courts. It is currently part of the ATP Challenger Tour. It was first held in Sion, Switzerland in 2026.

== Past finals ==
=== Singles ===
Year	Champion	Runner-up	Score
2026	(Switzerland) Dominic Stricker	(Lebanon) Benjamin Hassan	6–1, 2–6, 6–2

=== Doubles ===
Year	Champions	Runners-up	Score
2026	(Austria) Maximilian Neuchrist (Czech Republic) David Poljak	(Bolivia) Murkel Dellien (Argentina) Facundo Mena	6–4, 6–4
