= Bogdan Pavel =

Romanian tennis player (born 1999)

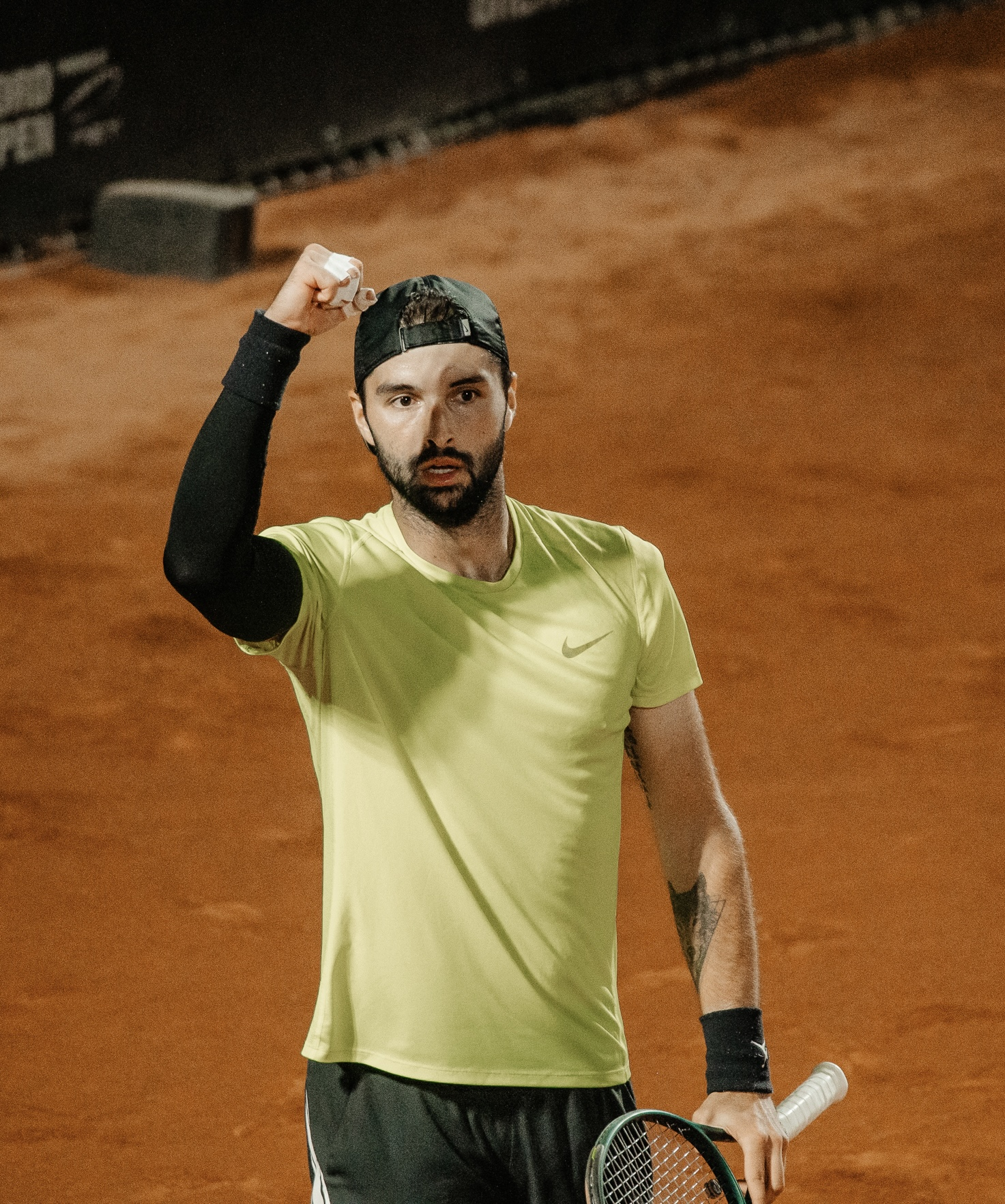
- Bogdan Pavel at the 2024 Iași Open
- Country (sports): Romania
- Born: 11 June 1999 (age 27) Pitești, Romania
- Height: 1.94 m (6 ft 4 in)
- Plays: Right-handed (two-handed backhand)
- Prize money: US $83,207

Singles
- Career record: 0–0
- Career titles: 2 ITF
- Highest ranking: No. 704 (1 July 2024)

Doubles
- Career record: 0–6
- Career titles: 1 Challenger, 9 ITF
- Highest ranking: No. 118 (15 June 2026)
- Current ranking: No. 118 (15 June 2026)
- Last updated on: 15 June 2026.

Bogdan Pavel (born 11 June 1999) is a Romanian tennis player. He has a career high ATP doubles ranking of world No. 118 achieved on 15 June 2026 and a career high ATP singles ranking of No. 704 achieved on 1 July 2024.

== Career ==
Pavel has won one ATP Challenger doubles title at the 2024 Iași Open with Cezar Crețu.

Pavel made his ATP main draw debut at the 2024 Țiriac Open after receiving a wildcard into the doubles main draw with Marius Copil. At the same tournament he also made his ATP main draw singles qualifying debut after entering into the singles qualifying draw as an alternate.

== ATP Challenger Tour finals ==
=== Doubles: 9 (2 titles, 7 runner-ups) ===
Legend ATP Challenger Tour (2–7)	Titles by surface Hard (0–1) Clay (2–6)

Result	W–L	Date	Tournament	Tier	Surface	Partner	Opponents	Score
Win	1–0	Jul 2024	Iași, Romania	Challenger	Clay	(Romania) Cezar Crețu	(Poland) Karol Drzewiecki (Poland) Piotr Matuszewski	2–6, 6–2, [10–4]
Loss	1–1	Jun 2025	Poznań, Poland	Challenger	Clay	(Romania) Alexandru Jecan	(Spain) Sergio Martos Gornés (India) Vijay Sundar Prashanth	6–2, 5–7, [8–10]
Loss	1–2	Jun 2025	Brașov, România	Challenger	Clay	(Romania) Alexandru Jecan	(Ukraine) Vladyslav Orlov (Argentina) Santiago Rodríguez Taverna	6–4, 6–7^{(5–7)}, [7–10]
Loss	1–3	Aug 2025	Sofia, Bulgaria	Challenger	Clay	(Romania) Alexandru Jecan	(Austria) David Pichler (Croatia) Nino Serdarušić	6–4, 6–7^{(2–7)}, [7–10]
Loss	1–4	Sep 2025	Lisbon, Portugal	Challenger	Clay	(Romania) Alexandru Jecan	(Spain) Pablo Llamas Ruiz (Spain) Sergio Martos Gornés	6–7^{(5–7)}, 4–6
Loss	1–5	Nov 2025	Helsinki, Finland	Challenger	Hard (i)	(Romania) Alexandru Jecan	(Germany) Jakob Schnaitter (Germany) Mark Wallner	2–6, 6–4, [6–10]
Loss	1–6	Jan 2026	Buenos Aires, Argentina	Challenger	Clay	(Romania) Alexandru Jecan	(Argentina) Mariano Kestelboim (Brazil) Marcelo Zormann	2–6, 4–6
Win	2–6	Jun 2026	Cattolica, Italy	Challenger	Clay	(Romania) Alexandru Jecan	(Sweden) Erik Grevelius (Sweden) Adam Heinonen	7–6^{(12–10)}, 6–4
Loss	2–7	Sep 2026	Plovdiv, Bulgaria	Challenger	Clay	(Spain) Benjamín Winter López	(Slovakia) Miloš Karol (Czech Republic) Andrew Paulson	3–6, 4–6
