= Corrientes Challenger =

Tennis tournament in Argentina

Defunct tennis tournament
- Event name: Corrientes Challenger
- Location: Corrientes, Argentina
- Venue: Corrientes Tennis Club
- Category: ATP Challenger Tour
- Surface: Clay

The Corrientes Challenger is a professional tennis tournament played on clay courts. It is currently part of the Association of Tennis Professionals (ATP) Challenger Tour. It is held in Corrientes, Argentina. It was held initially in 2015 but then took a six-year hiatus before returning in 2022.

== Past finals ==
=== Singles ===
Year	Champion	Runner-up	Score
2015	(Argentina) Máximo González	(Argentina) Diego Schwartzman	3–6, 7–5, 6–4
2016–2021	Not held		
2022	(Argentina) Francisco Comesaña	(Argentina) Mariano Navone	6–0, 6–3

=== Doubles ===
Year	Champions	Runners-up	Score
2015	(Chile) Julio Peralta (Argentina) Horacio Zeballos	(Argentina) Guillermo Durán (Argentina) Máximo González	6–3, 6–3
2016–2021	Not held		
2022	(Argentina) Guido Andreozzi (Argentina) Guillermo Durán	(Peru) Nicolás Álvarez (Bolivia) Murkel Dellien	7–5, 6–2
