= Ion Țiriac Challenger =

- 2025 Ion Țiriac Challenger

ATP Challenger Tour
- Location: Brașov, România
- Category: ATP Challenger Tour
- Surface: Clay

The Ion Țiriac Challenger is a professional tennis tournament played on clay courts. It is currently part of the ATP Challenger Tour. It was first held in Brașov, Romania in 2024.

== Past finals ==
=== Singles ===
Year	Champion	Runner-up	Score
2026	(Hungary) Zsombor Piros	(United States) Keegan Smith	6–4, 6–4
2025	(Italy) Francesco Maestrelli	(France) Luka Pavlovic	7–6^{(9–7)}, 6–4
2024	(Bolivia) Murkel Dellien	(Kazakhstan) Dmitry Popko	6–3, 7–5

=== Doubles ===
Year	Champions	Runners-up	Score
2026	(Austria) Maximilian Neuchrist (Czech Republic) Michael Vrbenský	(Spain) Íñigo Cervantes (Ukraine) Denys Molchanov	6–3, 3–6, [10–4]
2025	(Ukraine) Vladyslav Orlov (Argentina) Santiago Rodríguez Taverna	(Romania) Alexandru Jecan (Romania) Bogdan Pavel	4–6, 7–6^{(7–5)}, [10–7]
2024	(Spain) Javier Barranco Cosano (United States) Nicolas Moreno de Alboran	(Poland) Karol Drzewiecki (Poland) Piotr Matuszewski	3–6, 6–1, [17–15]
