= Murkel Dellien =

Bolivian tennis player (born 1997)

- Country (sports): Bolivia
- Born: 16 September 1997 (age 29) Trinidad, Bolivia
- Height: 1.93 m (6 ft 4 in)
- Plays: Right-handed (two-handed backhand)
- College: Wichita State
- Coach: Walter Grinovero
- Prize money: US $428,927

Singles
- Career record: 3–6
- Career titles: 4 ITF
- Highest ranking: No. 168 (15 July 2024)
- Current ranking: No. 307 (29 June 2026)

Grand Slam singles results
- Australian Open: Q1 (2025)
- French Open: Q1 (2024, 2025)
- Wimbledon: Q1 (2024, 2025)
- US Open: Q2 (2024)

Doubles
- Career record: 1–0
- Career titles: 2 ITF
- Highest ranking: No. 174 (1 April 2024)
- Current ranking: No. 308 (29 June 2026)
- Last updated on: 3 July 2026.

Murkel Alejandro Dellien Velasco (born 16 September 1997) is a Bolivian tennis player. He has a career-high ATP singles ranking of No. 168 achieved on 15 July 2024 and a career-high ATP doubles ranking of No. 174 achieved on 1 April 2024. He is the current No. 2 Bolivian tennis player. Dellien represents Bolivia at the Davis Cup, where he has a W/L record of 2–4.

== College career ==
Dellien played college tennis at Wichita State.

== Professional career ==
In 2021 Dellien defeated Zizou Bergs in his first Davis Cup rubber.

In July 2024, he won his maiden Challenger title at the 2024 Ion Țiriac Challenger in Brașov, Romania with a win over Dmitry Popko in the final. With his brother Hugo winning the title at the 2024 Iași Open, also in Romania, the Delliens became the first brothers to win a Challenger title in the same season since the Cerúndolos in 2022.

== Personal life ==
He is the younger brother of fellow tennis player Hugo Dellien. Their father, Hugo Eduardo Dellien, represented Beni Department as a substitute member of the Chamber of Deputies for the Social Democratic Power alliance from 2006 to 2010.

== ATP Challenger Tour finals ==
=== Singles: 4 (1 title, 3 runner-up) ===
Legend ATP Challenger Tour (1–3)

Result	W–L	Date	Tournament	Tier	Surface	Opponent	Score
Loss	0–1	Jan 2023	Tigre, Argentina	Challenger	Clay	(Argentina) Juan Manuel Cerúndolo	6–4, 4–6, 2–6
Loss	0–2	Mar 2024	Santa Cruz de la Sierra, Bolivia	Challenger	Clay	(Argentina) Camilo Ugo Carabelli	4–6, 2–6
Win	1–2	Jul 2024	Brașov, Romania	Challenger	Clay	(Kazakhstan) Dmitry Popko	6–3, 7–5
Loss	1–3	Aug 2025	Sofia, Bulgaria	Challenger	Clay	(Czech Republic) Zdeněk Kolář	2–6, 2–6

=== Doubles: 10 (3 titles, 7 runner-ups) ===
Legend ATP Challenger Tour (3–7)

Result	W–L	Date	Tournament	Tier	Surface	Partner	Opponents	Score
Loss	0–1	Jun 2022	Corrientes, Argentina	Challenger	Clay	(Peru) Nicolás Álvarez	(Argentina) Guido Andreozzi (Argentina) Guillermo Durán	5–7, 2–6
Loss	0–2	Aug 2022	Prague, Czech Republic	Challenger	Clay	(Bulgaria) Adrian Andreev	(Romania) Victor Vlad Cornea (Czech Republic) Andrew Paulson	3–6, 1–6
Win	1–2	May 2023	Coquimbo, Chile	Challenger	Clay	(Argentina) Valerio Aboian	(Argentina) Tomás Farjat (Italy) Facundo Juárez	7–6^{(7–4)}, 6–0
Loss	1–3	Sep 2023	Antofagasta, Chile	Challenger	Clay	(Italy) Luciano Darderi	(Bolivia) Boris Arias (Bolivia) Federico Zeballos	7–5, 4–6, [8–10]
Win	2–3	Jan 2024	Punta del Este, Uruguay	Challenger	Clay	(Argentina) Federico Agustín Gómez	(Argentina) Guido Andreozzi (Argentina) Guillermo Durán	6–3, 6–2
Loss	2–4	Mar 2024	Santa Cruz de la Sierra, Bolivia	Challenger	Clay	(Bolivia) Hugo Dellien	(Argentina) Andrea Collarini (Argentina) Renzo Olivo	7–5, 4–6, [8–10]
Win	3–4	Sep 2024	Buenos Aires, Argentina	Challenger	Clay	(Argentina) Facundo Mena	(Brazil) Felipe Meligeni Alves (Brazil) Marcelo Zormann	1–6, 6–2, [12–10]
Loss	3–5	Aug 2025	Cordenons, Italy	Challenger	Clay	(Bolivia) Boris Arias	(Czech Republic) Andrew Paulson (Czech Republic) Michael Vrbenský	4–6, 2–6
Loss	3–6	Aug 2026	Sion, Switzerland	Challenger	Clay	(Argentina) Facundo Mena	(Austria) Maximilian Neuchrist (Czech Republic) David Poljak	4–6, 4–6
Loss	3–7	Sep 2026	Buenos Aires, Argentina	Challenger	Clay	(Bolivia) Federico Zeballos	(Argentina) Mariano Kestelboim (Argentina) Santiago Rodríguez Taverna	4–6, 6–4, [5–10]

== ITF Futures/World Tennis Tour finals ==
=== Singles: 10 (6 titles, 4 runner-ups) ===
Legend ITF WTT (6–4)

Result	W–L	Date	Tournament	Tier	Surface	Opponent	Score
Loss	0–1	Feb 2022	M15 Naples, USA	WTT	Clay	(Brazil) Pedro Boscardin Dias	3–6, 6–7^{(5–7)}
Win	1–1	May 2022	M15 Quito, Ecuador	WTT	Clay	(Peru) Arklon Huertas del Pino	7–6^{(7–1)}, 6–3
Win	2–1	Jun 2022	M15 Quito, Ecuador	WTT	Clay	(Argentina) Juan Bautista Otegui	6–3, 6–2
Loss	2–2	Sep 2022	M25 Maribor, Slovenia	WTT	Clay	(Argentina) Hernán Casanova	4–6, 3–6
Win	3–2	Oct 2022	M15 Santa Cruz de la Sierra, Bolivia	WTT	Clay	(Peru) Conner Huertas del Pino	6–0, 6–2
Win	4–2	Nov 2022	M15 Santa Cruz de la Sierra, Bolivia	WTT	Clay	(Uruguay) Franco Roncadelli	7–6^{(7–5)}, 6–3
Loss	4–3	Mar 2023	M25 Río Cuarto, Argentina	WTT	Clay	(Spain) Pol Martín Tiffon	6–7^{(7–9)}, 6–3, 5–7
Win	5–3	Feb 2024	M25 Punta del Este, Uruguay	WTT	Clay	(Peru) Gonzalo Bueno	6–4, 3–6, 7–5
Win	6–3	Feb 2024	M25 Punta del Este, Uruguay	WTT	Clay	(Ecuador) Álvaro Guillén Meza	6–1, 6–0
Loss	6–4	Oct 2025	M25 Rio de Janeiro, Brazil	WTT	Clay	(Brazil) Eduardo Ribeiro	7–5, 2–6, 1–6

=== Doubles: 18 (12 titles, 6 runner-ups) ===
Legend ITF Futures/WTT (12–6)	Finals by surface Hard (1–0) Clay (11–6) Grass (0–0) Carpet (0–0)

Result	W–L	Date	Tournament	Tier	Surface	Partner	Opponents	Score
Loss	0–1	Sep 2012	Bolivia F2, Bolivia	Futures	Clay	(Bolivia) Hugo Dellien	(Argentina) Facundo Mena (Colombia) Sebastián Serrano	3–6, 5–7
Loss	0–2	Sep 2013	Bolivia F3, Bolivia	Futures	Clay	(Bolivia) Hugo Dellien	(Argentina) Franco Feitt (Argentina) José María Páez	3–6, 3–6
Win	1–2	Jun 2021	M25 Wichita, USA	WTT	Hard	(Chile) Nicolás Acevedo	(United States) John McNally (Canada) Benjamin Sigouin	6–4, 2–6, [12–10]
Win	2–2	Sep 2021	M15 Ibagué, Colombia	WTT	Clay	(Bolivia) Boris Arias	(Colombia) Alejandro Gómez (Colombia) Alejandro Hoyos	6–4, 3–6, [10–4]
Win	3–2	Oct 2021	M25 Lima, Peru	WTT	Clay	(Peru) Jorge Panta	(Ecuador) Cayetano March (Spain) Pol Martín Tiffon	7–6^{(7–4)}, 7–6^{(7–3)}
Loss	3–3	Nov 2021	M15 Córdoba, Argentina	WTT	Clay	(Bolivia) Boris Arias	(Uruguay) Ignacio Carou (Argentina) Alejo Lorenzo Lingua Lavallén	4–6, 7–5, [4–10]
Win	4–3	Apr 2022	M25 Rosario, Argentina	WTT	Clay	(Peru) Arklon Huertas del Pino	(Argentina) Tomás Farjat (Argentina) Ignacio Monzón	6–3, 6–3
Win	5–3	Apr 2022	M25 Rosario, Argentina	WTT	Clay	(Peru) Arklon Huertas del Pino	(Argentina) Román Andrés Burruchaga (Argentina) Juan Ignacio Galarza	6–3, 7–5
Loss	5–4	May 2022	M15 Quito, Ecuador	WTT	Clay	(Peru) Arklon Huertas del Pino	(Brazil) Igor Gimenez (Brazil) Nicolas Zanellato	2–6, 6–7^{(5–7)}
Win	6–4	Jun 2022	M15 Quito, Ecuador	WTT	Clay	(Peru) Arklon Huertas del Pino	(Bolivia) Alejandro Mendoza (Peru) Jorge Panta	6–3, 7–5
Win	7–4	Aug 2022	M25 Koksijde, Belgium	WTT	Clay	(Argentina) Hernán Casanova	(Croatia) Zvonimir Babić (Sweden) Simon Freund	6–1, 4–6, [10–5]
Win	8–4	Mar 2023	M25 San Miguel de Tucumán, Argentina	WTT	Clay	(Argentina) Valerio Aboian	(Argentina) Franco Emanuel Egea (Argentina) Gabriel Alejandro Hidalgo	6–7^{(5–7)}, 7–5, [10–7]
Loss	8–5	Jun 2023	M25 Jablonec nad Nisou, Czech Republic	WTT	Clay	(Brazil) Pedro Sakamoto	(Germany) Sebastian Fanselow (Czech Republic) Dominik Kellovský	2–6, 4–6
Win	9–5	Jun 2023	M25 Córdoba, Spain	WTT	Clay	(Argentina) Valerio Aboian	(Spain) Imanol López Morillo (Spain) Benjamín Winter López	6–3, 6–7^{(4–7)}, [11–9]
Loss	9–6	Jul 2023	M25 Kassel, Germany	WTT	Clay	(Serbia) Stefan Latinović	(Czech Republic) Jiří Barnat (Czech Republic) Patrik Rikl	4–6, 4–6
Win	10–6	Oct 2025	M25 Rio de Janeiro, Brazil	WTT	Clay	(Uruguay) Ignacio Carou	(Brazil) Christian Oliveira (Brazil) Paulo André Saraiva dos Santos	Walkover
Win	11–6	Jul 2026	M15 Villa Constitución, Argentina	WTT	Clay	(Argentina) Lorenzo Joaquín Rodríguez	(Argentina) Segundo Goity Zapico (Argentina) Tadeo Meneo	7–6^{(7–1)}, 6–2
Win	12–6	Jul 2026	M25 Wetzlar, Germany	WTT	Clay	(Argentina) Tomás Farjat	(Germany) Edison Ambarzumjan (India) Madhwin Kamath	6–2, 6–4
