= 2025 Brasil Tennis Open – Doubles =

Doubles
- 2025 Brasil Tennis Open

Final
- Champions: (Bolivia) Juan Carlos Prado Ángelo (Bolivia) Federico Zeballos
- Runners-up: (Argentina) Lautaro Midón (Argentina) Gonzalo Villanueva
- Score: 7–5, 7–5

Events
Singles	Doubles
← 2024 ·	Brasil Tennis Open	· 2026 →

Roberto Cid Subervi and Kaichi Uchida were the defending champions but chose not to defend their title.

Juan Carlos Prado Ángelo and Federico Zeballos won the title after defeating Lautaro Midón and Gonzalo Villanueva 7–5, 7–5 in the final.

== Seeds ==
1. (Brazil) Mateus Alves / (Brazil) Luís Britto (first round)
2. (Argentina) Leonardo Aboian / (Argentina) Valerio Aboian (first round)
3. (Peru) Arklon Huertas del Pino / (Peru) Conner Huertas del Pino (first round)
4. (Brazil) Mateo Barreiros Reyes / (Zimbabwe) Courtney John Lock (semifinals)

== Draw ==
=== Key ===
- Q = Qualifier
- WC = Wild card
- LL = Lucky loser
- Alt = Alternate
- ITF = ITF entry
- PR = Protected ranking
- SR = Special ranking
- SE = Special exempt
- JE = Junior exempt
- JR = Junior Accelerator Programme entrant
- CO = College Accelerator Programme entrant
- NG = Next Gen Accelerator Program entrant
- w/o = Walkover
- r = Retired
- d = Defaulted

=== Draw ===
First round
1	(Brazil) M Alves (Brazil) L Britto	6	4	[8]
(Argentina) L Midón (Argentina) G Villanueva	2	6	[10]
(Uruguay) F Roncadelli (Brazil) PA Saraiva dos Santos	3	3^{r}
(Brazil) M Pucinelli de Almeida (Brazil) P Sakamoto	6	2
4	(Brazil) M Barreiros Reyes (Zimbabwe) CJ Lock	7^{7}	6
Alt	(Argentina) N Kicker (Argentina) Fermín Tenti	6^{5}	4
Alt	(Argentina) Ignacio Monzón (Argentina) Lorenzo Joaquín Rodríguez	0	6	[9]
(Spain) N Álvarez Varona (Brazil) D Dutra da Silva	6	2	[11]
(Bolivia) JC Prado Ángelo (Bolivia) F Zeballos	6	7
WC	(Brazil) P Boscardin Dias (Brazil) João Eduardo Schiessl	2	5
(Uruguay) I Carou (Ecuador) Á Guillén Meza	4	6	[10]
3	(Peru) A Huertas del Pino (Peru) C Huertas del Pino	6	3	[6]
WC	(Brazil) E Ribeiro (Brazil) Gabriel Roveri Sidney	6^{2}	6	[9]
(Argentina) R Olivo (Spain) N Sánchez Izquierdo	7^{7}	1	[11]
(Argentina) H Casanova (Argentina) S Rodríguez Taverna	6^{4}	6	[10]
2	(Argentina) Leonardo Aboian (Argentina) V Aboian	7^{7}	3	[8]

Quarterfinals
(Argentina) L Midón (Argentina) G Villanueva	w/o
(Brazil) M Pucinelli de Almeida (Brazil) P Sakamoto
4	(Brazil) M Barreiros Reyes (Zimbabwe) CJ Lock	7^{7}	4	[10]
(Spain) N Álvarez Varona (Brazil) D Dutra da Silva	6^{5}	6	[8]
(Bolivia) JC Prado Ángelo (Bolivia) F Zeballos	6	6
(Uruguay) I Carou (Ecuador) Á Guillén Meza	4	0
(Argentina) R Olivo (Spain) N Sánchez Izquierdo	5	4
(Argentina) H Casanova (Argentina) S Rodríguez Taverna	7	6

Semifinals
(Argentina) L Midón (Argentina) G Villanueva	6	6
4	(Brazil) M Barreiros Reyes (Zimbabwe) CJ Lock	3	3
(Bolivia) JC Prado Ángelo (Bolivia) F Zeballos	6	3	[10]
(Argentina) H Casanova (Argentina) S Rodríguez Taverna	3	6	[7]

Final
(Argentina) L Midón (Argentina) G Villanueva	5	5
(Bolivia) JC Prado Ángelo (Bolivia) F Zeballos	7	7
