= 2024 Poznań Open – Singles =

Singles
- 2024 Poznań Open

Final
- Champion: (Poland) Maks Kaśnikowski
- Runner-up: (Argentina) Camilo Ugo Carabelli
- Score: 3–6, 6–4, 6–3

Events
Singles	Doubles
← 2023 ·	Poznań Open	· 2025 →

Mariano Navone was the defending champion but chose not to defend his title.

Maks Kaśnikowski won the title after defeating Camilo Ugo Carabelli 3–6, 6–4, 6–3 in the final.

== Seeds ==
1. (Spain) Albert Ramos Viñolas (first round)
2. (Argentina) Camilo Ugo Carabelli (final)
3. (Spain) Oriol Roca Batalla (first round)
4. (Germany) Rudolf Molleker (first round)
5. (Ukraine) Vitaliy Sachko (second round)
6. (Dominican Republic) Nick Hardt (quarterfinals)
7. (Italy) Franco Agamenone (withdrew)
8. (Kazakhstan) Dmitry Popko (first round)
9. (Kazakhstan) Timofey Skatov (first round)

== Draw ==
=== Key ===
- Q = Qualifier
- WC = Wild card
- LL = Lucky loser
- Alt = Alternate
- ITF = ITF entry
- PR = Protected ranking
- SR = Special ranking
- SE = Special exempt
- JE = Junior exempt
- JR = Junior Accelerator Programme entrant
- CO = College Accelerator Programme entrant
- NG = Next Gen Accelerator Program entrant
- w/o = Walkover
- r = Retired
- d = Defaulted

=== Finals ===
Semifinals
(Poland) Maks Kaśnikowski	3	6	6
(Poland) Kamil Majchrzak	6	3	4
(Argentina) Genaro Alberto Olivieri	4	4
2	(Argentina) Camilo Ugo Carabelli	6	6

Final
(Poland) Maks Kaśnikowski	3	6	6
2	(Argentina) Camilo Ugo Carabelli	6	4	3

=== Top half ===
First round
1	(Spain) A Ramos Viñolas	3	6^{7}
(Poland) M Kaśnikowski	6	7^{9}
Alt	(Italy) G Fonio	6	6
Alt	(United States) T Kodat	3	4
Alt	(Brazil) O Luz	5	6^{1}
(Italy) G Mager	7	7^{7}
(Czech Republic) D Svrčina	6	6^{3}	7^{7}
9	(Kazakhstan) T Skatov	2	7^{7}	6^{4}
4	(Germany) R Molleker	4	2
(Romania) FC Jianu	6	6
(Italy) Samuel Vincent Ruggeri	6	6
Alt	(Japan) R Noguchi	1	4
WC	(Ukraine) Viacheslav Bielinskyi	3	4
(Poland) K Majchrzak	6	6
WC	(Spain) P Carreño Busta	7^{7}	7^{7}
8	(Kazakhstan) D Popko	6^{5}	6^{4}

Second round
(Poland) M Kaśnikowski	6	7^{7}
Alt	(Italy) G Fonio	3	6^{0}
(Italy) G Mager	3	4
(Czech Republic) D Svrčina	6	6
(Romania) FC Jianu	6	4	4
(Italy) S Vincent Ruggeri	3	6	6
(Poland) K Majchrzak	7	4	7^{7}
WC	(Spain) P Carreño Busta	5	6	6^{2}

Quarterfinals
(Poland) M Kaśnikowski	6	6
(Czech Republic) D Svrčina	4	3
(Italy) S Vincent Ruggeri	6	1	3
(Poland) K Majchrzak	4	6	6

Semifinals
(Poland) M Kaśnikowski	3	6	6
(Poland) K Majchrzak	6	3	4

=== Bottom half ===
First round
6	(Dominican Republic) N Hardt	6	6
I Gakhov	1	4
Q	(Czech Republic) H Bartoň	7	6
WC	(Poland) Olaf Pieczkowski	5	0
Q	(Australia) Matthew Dellavedova	1	5
(Argentina) GA Olivieri	6	7
(Italy) E Dalla Valle	6	6
3	(Spain) O Roca Batalla	1	3
5	(Ukraine) V Sachko	6	6
Q	(Croatia) M Dodig	4	4
Q	(Portugal) G Elias	3	6	6
Q	(Poland) D Michalski	6	4	3
Q	(Brazil) D Dutra da Silva	6	6
LL	(Australia) J McCabe	3	2
(Spain) N Sánchez Izquierdo	4	2
2	(Argentina) C Ugo Carabelli	6	6

Second round
6	(Dominican Republic) N Hardt	6	6
Q	(Czech Republic) H Bartoň	2	1
(Argentina) GA Olivieri	1	6	6
(Italy) E Dalla Valle	6	3	4
5	(Ukraine) V Sachko	2	6	1
Q	(Portugal) G Elias	6	4	6
Q	(Brazil) D Dutra da Silva	4	5
2	(Argentina) C Ugo Carabelli	6	7

Quarterfinals
6	(Dominican Republic) N Hardt	5	2
(Argentina) GA Olivieri	7	6
Q	(Portugal) G Elias	7	5	3
2	(Argentina) C Ugo Carabelli	5	7	6

Semifinals
(Argentina) GA Olivieri	4	4
2	(Argentina) C Ugo Carabelli	6	6
