= 2024 Poznań Open – Doubles =

Doubles
- 2024 Poznań Open

Final
- Champions: (Brazil) Orlando Luz (Brazil) Marcelo Zormann
- Runners-up: (Germany) Jakob Schnaitter (Germany) Mark Wallner
- Score: 5–7, 6–2, [10–6]

Events
Singles	Doubles
← 2023 ·	Poznań Open	· 2025 →

Karol Drzewiecki and Petr Nouza were the defending champions but only Drzewiecki chose to defend his title, partnering Piotr Matuszewski. They lost in the quarterfinals to Orlando Luz and Marcelo Zormann.

Luz and Zormann won the title after defeating Jakob Schnaitter and Mark Wallner 5–7, 6–2, [10–6] in the final.

== Seeds ==
1. (Brazil) Orlando Luz / (Brazil) Marcelo Zormann (champions)
2. (South Korea) Nam Ji-sung / (Finland) Patrik Niklas-Salminen (semifinals)
3. (Ukraine) Vladyslav Manafov / (France) Luca Sanchez (semifinals)
4. (Germany) Jakob Schnaitter / (Germany) Mark Wallner (final)

== Draw ==
=== Key ===
- Q = Qualifier
- WC = Wild card
- LL = Lucky loser
- Alt = Alternate
- ITF = ITF entry
- PR = Protected ranking
- SR = Special ranking
- SE = Special exempt
- JE = Junior exempt
- JR = Junior Accelerator Programme entrant
- CO = College Accelerator Programme entrant
- NG = Next Gen Accelerator Program entrant
- w/o = Walkover
- r = Retired
- d = Defaulted

=== Draw ===
First round
1	(Brazil) O Luz (Brazil) M Zormann	7^{7}	2	[10]
(Romania) A Jecan (Austria) D Pichler	6^{5}	6	[7]
(Poland) K Drzewiecki (Poland) P Matuszewski	7	5	[10]
(United States) G Goldhoff (Poland) S Walków	5	7	[5]
3	(Ukraine) V Manafov (France) L Sanchez	4	6	[10]
WC	(Ukraine) O Krutykh (Poland) Fryderyk Lechno-Wasiutyński	6	3	[6]
(Greece) M Kalovelonis (Greece) Pe Tsitsipas	w/o
(Poland) M Kaśnikowski (Poland) K Majchrzak
(Brazil) M Alves (Brazil) D Dutra da Silva	w/o
(Argentina) GA Olivieri (Argentina) C Ugo Carabelli
(United Kingdom) S Duncan (United States) H Reese	5	6	[7]
4	(Germany) J Schnaitter (Germany) M Wallner	7	3	[10]
WC	(Poland) Aleksander Błuś (Poland) Martyn Pawelski	2	5
(Spain) O Roca Batalla (Spain) N Sánchez Izquierdo	6	7
(Spain) Í Cervantes (Spain) D Vega Hernández	2	1
2	(South Korea) J-s Nam (Finland) P Niklas-Salminen	6	6

Quarterfinals
1	(Brazil) O Luz (Brazil) M Zormann	7^{9}	6
(Poland) K Drzewiecki (Poland) P Matuszewski	6^{7}	4
3	(Ukraine) V Manafov (France) L Sanchez	6	6
(Greece) M Kalovelonis (Greece) Pe Tsitsipas	3	2
(Brazil) M Alves (Brazil) D Dutra da Silva	2	1
4	(Germany) J Schnaitter (Germany) M Wallner	6	6
(Spain) O Roca Batalla (Spain) N Sánchez Izquierdo
2	(South Korea) J-s Nam (Finland) P Niklas-Salminen	w/o

Semifinals
1	(Brazil) O Luz (Brazil) M Zormann	7^{7}	7^{7}
3	(Ukraine) V Manafov (France) L Sanchez	6^{3}	6^{3}
4	(Germany) J Schnaitter (Germany) M Wallner	6	6
2	(South Korea) J-s Nam (Finland) P Niklas-Salminen	3	4

Final
1	(Brazil) O Luz (Brazil) M Zormann	5	6	[10]
4	(Germany) J Schnaitter (Germany) M Wallner	7	2	[6]
