= 2025 Brasil Tennis Open – Singles =

Singles
- 2025 Brasil Tennis Open

Final
- Champion: (Argentina) Santiago Rodríguez Taverna
- Runner-up: (Spain) Nikolás Sánchez Izquierdo
- Score: 4–6, 6–4, 7–6^{(8–6)}

Events
Singles	Doubles
- Brasil Tennis Open

Ergi Kırkın was the defending champion but chose not to defend his title.

Santiago Rodríguez Taverna won the title after defeating Nikolás Sánchez Izquierdo 4–6, 6–4, 7–6^{(8–6)} in the final.

== Seeds ==
1. (Ecuador) Álvaro Guillén Meza (first round)
2. (Bolivia) Murkel Dellien (second round)
3. (Argentina) Santiago Rodríguez Taverna (champion)
4. (Argentina) Juan Bautista Torres (second round)
5. (Bolivia) Juan Carlos Prado Ángelo (second round)
6. (Argentina) Genaro Alberto Olivieri (first round)
7. (Brazil) Daniel Dutra da Silva (second round)
8. (Spain) Nicolás Álvarez Varona (first round)

== Draw ==
Key

- Q = Qualifier
- WC = Wild card
- LL = Lucky loser
- Alt = Alternate
- ITF = ITF entry
- PR = Protected ranking
- SR = Special ranking
- SE = Special exempt
- JE = Junior exempt
- JR = Junior Accelerator Programme entrant
- CO = College Accelerator Programme entrant
- NG = Next Gen Accelerator Program entrant
- w/o = Walkover
- r = Retired
- d = Defaulted

=== Finals ===
Semifinals
(Brazil) Matheus Pucinelli de Almeida	3	7^{7}	2
3	(Argentina) Santiago Rodríguez Taverna	6	6^{4}	6
(Spain) Nikolás Sánchez Izquierdo	1	7	6
SE	(Argentina) Alex Barrena	6	5	4

Final
3	(Argentina) Santiago Rodríguez Taverna	4	6	7^{8}
(Spain) Nikolás Sánchez Izquierdo	6	4	6^{6}

=== Top half ===
First round
1	(Ecuador) Á Guillén Meza	1	6	0
(Brazil) M Pucinelli de Almeida	6	3	6
Q	(Peru) C Huertas del Pino	6	5	6
Q	(Argentina) N Kicker	3	7	4
(Brazil) M Alves	6^{1}	7^{7}	4
(Argentina) L Midón	7^{7}	6^{3}	6
Q	(Argentina) LE Ambrogi	4	2
5	(Bolivia) JC Prado Ángelo	6	6
3	(Argentina) S Rodríguez Taverna	6	7
(Czech Republic) Z Kolář	4	5
Q	(Argentina) V Aboian	6	0
(Argentina) AL Lingua Lavallén	3	0^{r}
(Argentina) GI Justo	7^{8}	7
(Argentina) G Villanueva	6^{6}	5
Q	(Argentina) H Casanova	6	7^{7}
6	(Argentina) GA Olivieri	4	6^{5}

Second round
(Brazil) M Pucinelli de Almeida	7	6
Q	(Peru) C Huertas del Pino	5	1
(Argentina) L Midón	3	6	6
5	(Bolivia) JC Prado Ángelo	6	4	1
3	(Argentina) S Rodríguez Taverna	5
Q	(Argentina) V Aboian	3^{r}
(Argentina) GI Justo	6	6
Q	(Argentina) H Casanova	3	1

Quarterfinals
(Brazil) M Pucinelli de Almeida	6	6
(Argentina) L Midón	1	2
3	(Argentina) S Rodríguez Taverna	6	6^{4}	6
(Argentina) GI Justo	4	7^{7}	3

Semifinals
(Brazil) M Pucinelli de Almeida	3	7^{7}	2
3	(Argentina) S Rodríguez Taverna	6	6^{4}	6

=== Bottom half ===
First round
8	(Spain) N Álvarez Varona	4	6	4
(Brazil) P Boscardin Dias	6	3	6
Q	(Argentina) Leonardo Aboian	4	4
WC	(Brazil) E Ribeiro	6	6
(Spain) N Sánchez Izquierdo	6	6
(Brazil) P Sakamoto	2	0
PR	(Jamaica) B Bicknell	3	6^{1}
4	(Argentina) JB Torres	6	7^{7}
7	(Brazil) D Dutra da Silva	6	6
(Argentina) R Olivo	2	3
LL	(United States) B Kuzuhara	2	1
SE	(Argentina) A Barrena	6	6
WC	(Brazil) Vicente Freda	2	0
Alt	(Brazil) JL Reis da Silva	6	6
WC	(Brazil) L Miguel	2	6	3
2	(Bolivia) M Dellien	6	3	6

Second round
(Brazil) P Boscardin Dias	0	6	5
WC	(Brazil) E Ribeiro	6	0	7
(Spain) N Sánchez Izquierdo	6	1	6
4	(Argentina) JB Torres	3	6	1
7	(Brazil) D Dutra da Silva	4	3
SE	(Argentina) A Barrena	6	6
Alt	(Brazil) JL Reis da Silva	6	6
2	(Bolivia) M Dellien	2	1

Quarterfinals
WC	(Brazil) E Ribeiro	5	5
(Spain) N Sánchez Izquierdo	7	7
SE	(Argentina) A Barrena	4	6	6
Alt	(Brazil) JL Reis da Silva	6	3	3

Semifinals
(Spain) N Sánchez Izquierdo	1	7	6
SE	(Argentina) A Barrena	6	5	4
