= 2024 Poznań Open =

Professional tennis tournament

- Date: 17 – 22 June
- Edition: 20th
- Surface: Clay
- Location: Poznań, Poland
- Venue: Park Tenisowy Olimpia

Champions

Singles
- (Poland) Maks Kaśnikowski

Doubles
- (Brazil) Orlando Luz / (Brazil) Marcelo Zormann
← 2023 ·	Poznań Open	· 2025 →

The 2024 Enea Poznań Open was a professional tennis tournament played on clay courts. It was the 20th edition of the tournament which was part of the 2024 ATP Challenger Tour. It took place at the Park Tenisowy Olimpia in Poznań, Poland from 17 to 22 June 2024.

== Singles main-draw entrants ==
=== Seeds ===
Country	Player	Rank^{1}	Seed
ESP	Albert Ramos Viñolas	110	1
ARG	Camilo Ugo Carabelli	114	2
ESP	Oriol Roca Batalla	158	3
GER	Rudolf Molleker	196	4
UKR	Vitaliy Sachko	203	5
DOM	Nick Hardt	210	6
~~ITA~~	~~Franco Agamenone~~	~~226~~	~~7~~
KAZ	Dmitry Popko	231	8
KAZ	Timofey Skatov	234	9

- ^{1} Rankings are as of 10 June 2024.

=== Other entrants ===
The following players received wildcards into the singles main draw:

- (Ukraine) Viacheslav Bielinskyi
- (Spain) Pablo Carreño Busta
- (Poland) Olaf Pieczkowski

The following players received entry into the singles main draw as alternates:

- (Italy) Giovanni Fonio
- (United States) Toby Kodat
- (Brazil) Orlando Luz
- (Japan) Rio Noguchi

The following players received entry from the qualifying draw:

- (Czech Republic) Hynek Bartoň
- (Australia) Matthew Dellavedova
- (Croatia) Matej Dodig
- (Brazil) Daniel Dutra da Silva
- (Portugal) Gastão Elias
- (Poland) Daniel Michalski

The following player received entry as a lucky loser:

- (Australia) James McCabe

== Champions ==
=== Singles ===
- (Poland) Maks Kaśnikowski def. (Argentina) Camilo Ugo Carabelli 3–6, 6–4, 6–3.

=== Doubles ===
- (Brazil) Orlando Luz / (Brazil) Marcelo Zormann def. (Germany) Jakob Schnaitter / (Germany) Mark Wallner 5–7, 6–2, [10–6].
