= 2026 Szczecin Open – Singles =

Singles
- 2026 Szczecin Open

Final
- Champion: (Spain) Nikolás Sánchez Izquierdo
- Runner-up: (Brazil) Thiago Monteiro
- Score: 4–6, 6–3, 7–6^{(8–6)}

Events
Singles	Doubles
- Szczecin Open

Thiago Agustín Tirante was the defending champion but chose not to defend his title.

Nikolás Sánchez Izquierdo won the title after defeating Thiago Monteiro 4–6, 6–3, 7–6^{(8–6)} in the final.

== Seeds ==
1. (Argentina) Facundo Díaz Acosta (first round)
2. (Argentina) Marco Trungelliti (semifinals)
3. (Germany) Tom Gentzsch (quarterfinals)
4. (Italy) Stefano Travaglia (first round)
5. (Italy) Marco Cecchinato (quarterfinals)
6. (Serbia) Dušan Lajović (first round, retired)
7. (Czech Republic) Zdeněk Kolář (quarterfinals)
8. (Croatia) Luka Mikrut (semifinals)

== Draw ==
Key

- Q = Qualifier
- WC = Wild card
- LL = Lucky loser
- Alt = Alternate
- ITF = ITF entry
- PR = Protected ranking
- SR = Special ranking
- SE = Special exempt
- JE = Junior exempt
- JR = Junior Accelerator Programme entrant
- CO = College Accelerator Programme entrant
- NG = Next Gen Accelerator Program entrant
- w/o = Walkover
- r = Retired
- d = Defaulted

=== Finals ===
Semifinals
(Spain) Nikolás Sánchez Izquierdo	6	6
8	(Croatia) Luka Mikrut	3	4
Alt	(Brazil) Thiago Monteiro	6	3	6
2	(Argentina) Marco Trungelliti	4	6	3

Final
(Spain) Nikolás Sánchez Izquierdo	4	6	7^{8}
Alt	(Brazil) Thiago Monteiro	6	3	6^{6}

=== Top half ===
First round
1	(Argentina) F Díaz Acosta	7	2	3
Alt	(Colombia) DE Galán	5	6	6
LL	(United States) Dali Blanch	2	2
(Spain) N Sánchez Izquierdo	6	6
(Czech Republic) H Bartoň	4	6	6
(Italy) R Brancaccio	6	2	1
Q	I Gakhov	6	2	2
7	(Czech Republic) Z Kolář	4	6	6
3	(Germany) T Gentzsch	7	6^{3}	6
WC	(Poland) A Ważny	5	7^{7}	0
WC	(Poland) Kacper Knitter	2	2
(Czech Republic) M Krumich	6	6
Q	(Switzerland) J Nikles	7^{8}	3	0
(Serbia) L Djere	6^{6}	6	6
Q	(Latvia) R Strombachs	6	4	0
8	(Croatia) L Mikrut	4	6	6

Second round
Alt	(Colombia) DE Galán	0	3
(Spain) N Sánchez Izquierdo	6	6
(Czech Republic) H Bartoň	4	4
7	(Czech Republic) Z Kolář	6	6
3	(Germany) T Gentzsch	6	6
(Czech Republic) M Krumich	3	4
(Serbia) L Djere	3	2^{r}
8	(Croatia) L Mikrut	6	2

Quarterfinals
(Spain) N Sánchez Izquierdo	6	6
7	(Czech Republic) Z Kolář	1	3
3	(Germany) T Gentzsch	3	6	3
8	(Croatia) L Mikrut	6	4	6

Semifinals
(Spain) N Sánchez Izquierdo	6	6
8	(Croatia) L Mikrut	3	4

=== Bottom half ===
First round
6	(Serbia) D Lajović	1^{r}
(Germany) D Dedura	5
(Switzerland) K Feldbausch	6	6
Q	(Germany) K Wehnelt	2	2
(Ukraine) V Sachko	6	6
(Romania) FC Jianu	3	1
Alt	(Brazil) T Monteiro	6	7^{7}
4	(Italy) S Travaglia	3	6^{3}
5	(Italy) M Cecchinato	7	6
(Germany) H Squire	5	3
(Germany) M Möller	6	6
WC	(Poland) D Michalski	2	4
Q	(Portugal) T Pereira	7	4	5
Q	(Poland) F Pieczonka	5	6	7
(France) Sean Cuenin	6^{4}	2
2	(Argentina) M Trungelliti	7^{7}	6

Second round
(Germany) D Dedura	7^{7}	4	7^{7}
(Switzerland) K Feldbausch	6^{4}	6	6^{4}
(Ukraine) V Sachko	7^{7}	4	6^{3}
Alt	(Brazil) T Monteiro	6^{3}	6	7^{7}
5	(Italy) M Cecchinato	7^{7}	6^{4}	6
(Germany) M Möller	6^{5}	7^{7}	2
Q	(Poland) F Pieczonka	7^{7}	5	4
2	(Argentina) M Trungelliti	6^{3}	7	6

Quarterfinals
(Germany) D Dedura	4	2
Alt	(Brazil) T Monteiro	6	6
5	(Italy) M Cecchinato	6^{6}	5
2	(Argentina) M Trungelliti	7^{8}	7

Semifinals
Alt	(Brazil) T Monteiro	6	3	6
2	(Argentina) M Trungelliti	4	6	3
