= 2024 Brasil Tennis Open – Singles =

Singles
- 2024 Brasil Tennis Open

Final
- Champion: (Turkey) Ergi Kırkın
- Runner-up: (Brazil) Daniel Dutra da Silva
- Score: 6–3, 7–5

Events
Singles	Doubles
- Brasil Tennis Open

This was the first edition of the tournament.

Ergi Kırkın won the title after defeating Daniel Dutra da Silva 6–3, 7–5 in the final.

== Seeds ==
1. (France) Calvin Hemery (first round)
2. (Bolivia) Murkel Dellien (first round)
3. (Kazakhstan) Dmitry Popko (first round)
4. (Venezuela) Gonzalo Oliveira (first round)
5. (Brazil) João Lucas Reis da Silva (first round, retired)
6. (Lebanon) Hady Habib (first round)
7. (Ecuador) Álvaro Guillén Meza (first round)
8. (Turkey) Ergi Kırkın (champion)

== Draw ==
Key

- Q = Qualifier
- WC = Wild card
- LL = Lucky loser
- Alt = Alternate
- ITF = ITF entry
- PR = Protected ranking
- SR = Special ranking
- SE = Special exempt
- JE = Junior exempt
- JR = Junior Accelerator Programme entrant
- CO = College Accelerator Programme entrant
- NG = Next Gen Accelerator Program entrant
- w/o = Walkover
- r = Retired
- d = Defaulted

=== Finals ===
Semifinals
(Argentina) Facundo Mena	3	4
LL	(Brazil) Daniel Dutra da Silva	6	6
(Peru) Gonzalo Bueno	6^{5}	6	3
8	(Turkey) Ergi Kırkın	7^{7}	3	6

Final
LL	(Brazil) Daniel Dutra da Silva	3	5
8	(Turkey) Ergi Kırkın	6	7

=== Top half ===
First round
1	(France) C Hemery	2	1
Q	(Brazil) K Sell	6	6
(Brazil) P Boscardin Dias	3	6	6
(Argentina) V Aboian	6	4	4
(Argentina) F Mena	3	6	6
Q	(Argentina) Leonardo Aboian	6	1	1
Q	(Japan) K Uchida	6	4	1
5	(Brazil) JL Reis da Silva	3	6	0^{r}
4	(Venezuela) G Oliveira	5	6	5
LL	(Brazil) D Dutra da Silva	7	4	7
WC	(Brazil) L Miguel	2	0
(Argentina) G Villanueva	6	6
Q	(Argentina) GI Justo	6	2	6
(Brazil) P Sakamoto	2	6	3
(Dominican Republic) R Cid Subervi	7	6
6	(Lebanon) H Habib	5	1

Second round
Q	(Brazil) K Sell	6	6
(Brazil) P Boscardin Dias	3	0
(Argentina) F Mena	7	6
Q	(Japan) K Uchida	5	2
LL	(Brazil) D Dutra da Silva	6	6
(Argentina) G Villanueva	1	3
Q	(Argentina) GI Justo	6	6
(Dominican Republic) R Cid Subervi	2	4

Quarterfinals
Q	(Brazil) K Sell	7^{9}	4	1
(Argentina) F Mena	6^{7}	6	6
LL	(Brazil) D Dutra da Silva	2	6	6
Q	(Argentina) GI Justo	6	3	2

Semifinals
(Argentina) F Mena	3	4
LL	(Brazil) D Dutra da Silva	6	6

=== Bottom half ===
First round
7	(Ecuador) Á Guillén Meza	6^{5}	6	1
(Peru) G Bueno	7^{7}	3	6
(Brazil) Nicolas Zanellato	6	6^{6}	7^{7}
(Greece) S Sakellaridis	3	7^{8}	6^{5}
WC	(Brazil) Gustavo Ribeiro de Almeida	6^{1}	0
(Brazil) M Alves	7^{7}	6
Q	(Bolivia) JC Prado Ángelo	7^{7}	7^{10}
3	(Kazakhstan) D Popko	6^{5}	6^{8}
8	(Turkey) E Kırkın	6	7^{7}
(Paraguay) AD Vallejo	1	6^{3}
Q	(Brazil) Igor Gimenez	6^{5}	5
Alt	(United States) B Kuzuhara	7^{7}	7
Alt	(Argentina) JB Torres	6	6
WC	(Brazil) G Clezar	2	0
(Argentina) LE Ambrogi	7^{7}	7
2	(Bolivia) M Dellien	6^{3}	5

Second round
(Peru) G Bueno	6	2	6
(Brazil) N Zanellato	1	6	4
(Brazil) M Alves	1^{r}
Q	(Bolivia) JC Prado Ángelo	5
8	(Turkey) E Kırkın	3	6	6
Alt	(United States) B Kuzuhara	6	4	2
Alt	(Argentina) JB Torres	7	6
(Argentina) LE Ambrogi	5	0

Quarterfinals
(Peru) G Bueno	6	6
Q	(Bolivia) JC Prado Ángelo	3	1
8	(Turkey) E Kırkın	6	6^{3}	7
Alt	(Argentina) JB Torres	3	7^{7}	5

Semifinals
(Peru) G Bueno	6^{5}	6	3
8	(Turkey) E Kırkın	7^{7}	3	6
