= 2026 Szczecin Open – Doubles =

Doubles
- 2026 Szczecin Open

Final
- Champions: (Czech Republic) Andrew Paulson (Portugal) Tiago Pereira
- Runners-up: (Spain) Íñigo Cervantes (Ukraine) Denys Molchanov
- Score: 6–2, 6–0

Events
Singles	Doubles
- Szczecin Open

Denys Molchanov and David Pichler were the defending champions but only Molchanov chose to defend his title, partnering Íñigo Cervantes. They lost in the final to Andrew Paulson and Tiago Pereira.

Paulson and Pereira won the title after defeating Cervantes and Molchanov 6–2, 6–0 in the final.

== Seeds ==
1. (Argentina) Mariano Kestelboim / (Brazil) Fernando Romboli (quarterfinals)
2. (Poland) Piotr Matuszewski / (Poland) Filip Pieczonka (quarterfinals)
3. (Croatia) Admir Kalender / (Croatia) Nino Serdarušić (first round)
4. (Spain) Íñigo Cervantes / (Ukraine) Denys Molchanov (final)

== Draw ==
Key

- Q = Qualifier
- WC = Wild card
- LL = Lucky loser
- Alt = Alternate
- ITF = ITF entry
- PR = Protected ranking
- SR = Special ranking
- SE = Special exempt
- JE = Junior exempt
- JR = Junior Accelerator Programme entrant
- CO = College Accelerator Programme entrant
- NG = Next Gen Accelerator Program entrant
- w/o = Walkover
- r = Retired
- d = Defaulted

First round
1	(Argentina) M Kestelboim (Brazil) F Romboli	6	6^{10}	[10]
Alt	(Czech Republic) H Bartoň (Spain) N Sánchez Izquierdo	1	7^{12}	[8]
(Czech Republic) A Paulson (Portugal) T Pereira	6	6
(Spain) S Martos Gornés (Poland) S Walków	4	2
3	(Croatia) A Kalender (Croatia) N Serdarušić	4	4
(Italy) S Travaglia (Germany) K Wehnelt	6	6
(Poland) S Kielan (Czech Republic) Z Kolář	3	4
(Spain) M Mansilla Díez (Spain) B Winter López	6	6
(Ukraine) V Sachko (Czech Republic) M Vrbenský	6	6
WC	(Poland) Jan Chłodnicki (Greece) Pa Tsitsipas	2	2
WC	(Poland) Kacper Knitter (Poland) Oliwier Sterniczuk	1	3
4	(Spain) Í Cervantes (Ukraine) D Molchanov	6	6
(Romania) A Jecan (Romania) B Pavel	7^{7}	7^{7}
(Czech Republic) D Poljak (Germany) T Rühl	6^{0}	6^{3}
(Romania) V Cornea (Netherlands) J Jans	4	4
2	(Poland) P Matuszewski (Poland) F Pieczonka	6	6

Quarterfinals
1	(Argentina) M Kestelboim (Brazil) F Romboli	1	2
(Czech Republic) A Paulson (Portugal) T Pereira	6	6
(Italy) S Travaglia (Germany) K Wehnelt	3	2
(Spain) M Mansilla Díez (Spain) B Winter López	6	6
(Ukraine) V Sachko (Czech Republic) M Vrbenský	1	4
4	(Spain) Í Cervantes (Ukraine) D Molchanov	6	6
(Romania) A Jecan (Romania) B Pavel	6	3	[10]
2	(Poland) P Matuszewski (Poland) F Pieczonka	1	6	[6]

Semifinals
(Czech Republic) A Paulson (Portugal) T Pereira	6	7^{7}
(Spain) M Mansilla Díez (Spain) B Winter López	1	6^{4}
4	(Spain) Í Cervantes (Ukraine) D Molchanov	3	6	[10]
(Romania) A Jecan (Romania) B Pavel	6	3	[6]

Final
(Czech Republic) A Paulson (Portugal) T Pereira	6	6
4	(Spain) Í Cervantes (Ukraine) D Molchanov	2	0
