= 2024 Brasil Tennis Open – Doubles =

Doubles
- 2024 Brasil Tennis Open

Final
- Champions: (Dominican Republic) Roberto Cid Subervi (Japan) Kaichi Uchida
- Runners-up: (Australia) Patrick Harper (United Kingdom) David Stevenson
- Score: 5–7, 7–6^{(7–1)}, [10–6]

Events
Singles	Doubles
- Brasil Tennis Open

This was the first edition of the tournament.

Roberto Cid Subervi and Kaichi Uchida won the title after defeating Patrick Harper and David Stevenson 5–7, 7–6^{(7–1)}, [10–6] in the final.

== Seeds ==
1. (Brazil) Mateus Alves / (Brazil) Daniel Dutra da Silva (quarterfinals, withdrew)
2. (Brazil) Luís Britto / (Argentina) Gonzalo Villanueva (quarterfinals)
3. (Brazil) Pedro Boscardin Dias / (Ecuador) Álvaro Guillén Meza (first round)
4. (Australia) Patrick Harper / (United Kingdom) David Stevenson (final)

== Draw ==
Key

- Q = Qualifier
- WC = Wild card
- LL = Lucky loser
- Alt = Alternate
- ITF = ITF entry
- PR = Protected ranking
- SR = Special ranking
- SE = Special exempt
- JE = Junior exempt
- JR = Junior Accelerator Programme entrant
- CO = College Accelerator Programme entrant
- NG = Next Gen Accelerator Program entrant
- w/o = Walkover
- r = Retired
- d = Defaulted

=== Draw ===
First round
1	(Brazil) M Alves (Brazil) D Dutra da Silva	7^{7}	6^{2}	[10]
(Japan) S Watanabe (Japan) T Yuzuki	6^{2}	7^{7}	[2]
(France) C Hemery (Tunisia) A Ouakaa	7^{12}	6
Alt	(Brazil) Wilson Leite (Brazil) P Sakamoto	6^{10}	3
4	(Australia) P Harper (United Kingdom) D Stevenson	6	6
(Argentina) LE Ambrogi (Uruguay) I Carou	2	2
Alt	(Brazil) Enrique Bogo (Paraguay) Hernando José Escurra Isnardi	6^{5}	4
(Argentina) F Mena (Greece) S Sakellaridis	7^{7}	6
(Dominican Republic) R Cid Subervi (Japan) K Uchida	6	6
WC	(Brazil) G Clezar (Brazil) F Neis	3	2
WC	(Brazil) L Miguel (Brazil) K Sell	6	6
3	(Brazil) P Boscardin Dias (Ecuador) Á Guillén Meza	3	4
(Israel) R Stepanov (Colombia) A Urrea	4	4
Alt	(Argentina) Leonardo Aboian (Argentina) V Aboian	6	6
Alt	(Argentina) F Ribero (Bulgaria) Leonid Sheyngezikht	0	2
2	(Brazil) L Britto (Argentina) G Villanueva	6	6

Quarterfinals
1	(Brazil) M Alves (Brazil) D Dutra da Silva
(France) C Hemery (Tunisia) A Ouakaa	w/o
4	(Australia) P Harper (United Kingdom) D Stevenson	w/o
(Argentina) F Mena (Greece) S Sakellaridis
(Dominican Republic) R Cid Subervi (Japan) K Uchida	7^{7}	6
WC	(Brazil) L Miguel (Brazil) K Sell	6^{2}	3
Alt	(Argentina) L Aboian (Argentina) V Aboian	6	6
2	(Brazil) L Britto (Argentina) G Villanueva	3	4

Semifinals
(France) C Hemery (Tunisia) A Ouakaa	3	6^{1}
4	(Australia) P Harper (United Kingdom) D Stevenson	6	7^{7}
(Dominican Republic) R Cid Subervi (Japan) K Uchida	6	6
Alt	(Argentina) L Aboian (Argentina) V Aboian	4	3

Final
4	(Australia) P Harper (United Kingdom) D Stevenson	7	6^{1}	[6]
(Dominican Republic) R Cid Subervi (Japan) K Uchida	5	7^{7}	[10]
