= 2025 Poznań Open – Singles =

Singles
- 2025 Poznań Open

Final
- Champion: (Austria) Filip Misolic
- Runner-up: (Czech Republic) Dalibor Svrčina
- Score: 6–2, 6–0

Events
| Singles | Doubles |
- Poznań Open

Maks Kaśnikowski was the defending champion but lost in the first round to Filip Misolic.

Misolic won the title after defeating Dalibor Svrčina 6–2, 6–0 in the final.

== Seeds ==
1. (Chile) Cristian Garín (semifinals)
2. (Argentina) Thiago Agustín Tirante (semifinals)
3. (Czech Republic) Dalibor Svrčina (final)
4. (Austria) Filip Misolic (champion)
5. (Portugal) Henrique Rocha (withdrew)
6. (Italy) Andrea Pellegrino (withdrew)
7. (Austria) Jurij Rodionov (quarterfinals)
8. (Argentina) Facundo Mena (first round, retired)
9. (Kazakhstan) Timofey Skatov (second round)

== Draw ==
Key

- Q = Qualifier
- WC = Wild card
- LL = Lucky loser
- Alt = Alternate
- ITF = ITF entry
- PR = Protected ranking
- SR = Special ranking
- SE = Special exempt
- JE = Junior exempt
- JR = Junior Accelerator Programme entrant
- CO = College Accelerator Programme entrant
- NG = Next Gen Accelerator Program entrant
- w/o = Walkover
- r = Retired
- d = Defaulted

=== Finals ===
Semifinals
1 | (Chile) Cristian Garín | 3 | 4
4 | (Austria) Filip Misolic | 6 | 6
3 | (Czech Republic) Dalibor Svrčina | 6 | 6
2 | (Argentina) Thiago Agustín Tirante | 3 | 4

Final
4 | (Austria) Filip Misolic | 6 | 6
3 | (Czech Republic) Dalibor Svrčina | 2 | 0

=== Top half ===
First round
1 | (Chile) C Garín | 6 | 6
Alt | A Vatutin | 1 | 0
WC | (Poland) A Ważny | 2 | 6 | 4
(India) S Nagal | 6 | 4 | 6
Q | (Czech Republic) M Mrva | 6 | 6
Q | (Germany) R Molleker | 3 | 2
WC | (Egypt) Fares Zakaria | 1 | 6^{6}
Q | (Czech Republic) M Krumich | 6 | 7^{8}
4 | (Austria) F Misolic | 6 | 6
(Poland) M Kaśnikowski | 3 | 0
(Croatia) M Poljičak | 4 | 3
Q | (Czech Republic) Z Kolář | 6 | 6
WC | (Poland) T Berkieta | 4 | 6^{2}
Alt | (Poland) D Michalski | 6 | 7^{7}
LL | (Spain) N Álvarez Varona | 6 | 3 | 2
7 | (Austria) J Rodionov | 3 | 6 | 6

Second round
1 | (Chile) C Garín | 6 | 3 | 6
(India) S Nagal | 4 | 6 | 4
Q | (Czech Republic) M Mrva | 5 | 7^{7} | 1
Q | (Czech Republic) M Krumich | 7 | 6^{5} | 6
4 | (Austria) F Misolic | 6 | 6
Q | (Czech Republic) Z Kolář | 2 | 2
Alt | (Poland) D Michalski | 5 | 2
7 | (Austria) J Rodionov | 7 | 6

Quarterfinals
1 | (Chile) C Garín | 6 | 6
Q | (Czech Republic) M Krumich | 2 | 0
4 | (Austria) F Misolic | 6 | 6
7 | (Austria) J Rodionov | 3 | 2

Semifinals
1 | (Chile) C Garín | 3 | 4
4 | (Austria) F Misolic | 6 | 6

=== Bottom half ===
First round
9 | (Kazakhstan) T Skatov | 6 | 6
(Moldova) R Albot | 2 | 4
LL | (Czech Republic) H Bartoň | 6 | 6
Q | (United States) T Kodat | 1 | 3
Q | (Germany) D Dedura | 3 | 2
(France) M Martineau | 6 | 6
(Germany) H Squire | 4 | 6^{6}
3 | (Czech Republic) D Svrčina | 6 | 7^{8}
8 | (Argentina) F Mena | 3 | 1^{r}
(Paraguay) AD Vallejo | 6 | 3
(Monaco) V Vacherot | 2 | 4
(Italy) L Giustino | 6 | 6
(Norway) V Durasovic | 6 | 6
(Portugal) F Ferreira Silva | 1 | 4
(Kazakhstan) D Yevseyev | 4 | 1
2 | (Argentina) TA Tirante | 6 | 6

Second round
9 | (Kazakhstan) T Skatov | 6^{5} | 5
LL | (Czech Republic) H Bartoň | 7^{7} | 7
(France) M Martineau | 4 | 3
3 | (Czech Republic) D Svrčina | 6 | 6
(Paraguay) AD Vallejo | 3 | 6 | 3
(Italy) L Giustino | 6 | 3 | 6
(Norway) V Durasovic | 6^{4} | 1
2 | (Argentina) TA Tirante | 7^{7} | 6

Quarterfinals
LL | (Czech Republic) H Bartoň | 5 | 3
3 | (Czech Republic) D Svrčina | 7 | 6
(Italy) L Giustino | 1 | 1
2 | (Argentina) TA Tirante | 6 | 6

Semifinals
3 | (Czech Republic) D Svrčina | 6 | 6
2 | (Argentina) TA Tirante | 3 | 4
