= 2025 Poznań Open – Doubles =

Doubles
- 2025 Poznań Open

Final
- Champions: (Spain) Sergio Martos Gornés (India) Vijay Sundar Prashanth
- Runners-up: (Romania) Alexandru Jecan (Romania) Bogdan Pavel
- Score: 2–6, 7–5, [10–8]

Events
Singles	Doubles
← 2024 ·	Poznań Open	· 2026 →

Orlando Luz and Marcelo Zormann were the defending champions but only Zormann chose to defend his title, partnering Mateus Alves. They lost in the quarterfinals to Sergio Martos Gornés and Vijay Sundar Prashanth.

Martos Gornés and Prashanth won the title after defeating Alexandru Jecan and Bogdan Pavel 2–6, 7–5, [10–8] in the final.

== Seeds ==
1. (Netherlands) Matwé Middelkoop / (Netherlands) Jean-Julien Rojer (semifinals)
2. (Romania) Victor Vlad Cornea / (Poland) Karol Drzewiecki (quarterfinals)
3. (Israel) Daniel Cukierman / (Poland) Piotr Matuszewski (first round)
4. (India) Anirudh Chandrasekar / (India) Ramkumar Ramanathan (first round)

== Draw ==
Key

- Q = Qualifier
- WC = Wild card
- LL = Lucky loser
- Alt = Alternate
- ITF = ITF entry
- PR = Protected ranking
- SR = Special ranking
- SE = Special exempt
- JE = Junior exempt
- JR = Junior Accelerator Programme entrant
- CO = College Accelerator Programme entrant
- NG = Next Gen Accelerator Program entrant
- w/o = Walkover
- r = Retired
- d = Defaulted

=== Draw ===
First round
1	(Netherlands) M Middelkoop (Netherlands) J-J Rojer	6	7^{7}
(Austria) D Pichler (Poland) S Walków	4	6^{4}
(Slovakia) M Karol (Czech Republic) M Vrbenský	4	3
(Denmark) J Ingildsen (Portugal) T Pereira	6	6
4	(India) A Chandrasekar (India) R Ramanathan	6^{5}	4
(Brazil) M Alves (Brazil) M Zormann	7^{7}	6
(Spain) S Martos Gornés (India) VS Prashanth	6	6
(France) L Sanchez (Japan) S Watanabe	3	2
WC	(Poland) S Kielan (Poland) F Pieczonka	6	5	[7]
(Venezuela) LD Martínez (Argentina) F Mena	3	7	[10]
(Bulgaria) A Donski (Spain) B Pujol Navarro	6	6
3	(Israel) D Cukierman (Poland) P Matuszewski	3	4
(Romania) A Jecan (Romania) B Pavel	6	6
WC	(Finland) O Paldanius (Poland) A Ważny	4	4
PR	(Czech Republic) A Paulson (Czech Republic) M Vocel	4	6^{5}
2	(Romania) V Cornea (Poland) K Drzewiecki	6	7^{7}

Quarterfinals
1	(Netherlands) M Middelkoop (Netherlands) J-J Rojer	3	7^{7}	[11]
(Denmark) J Ingildsen (Portugal) T Pereira	6	6^{1}	[9]
(Brazil) M Alves (Brazil) M Zormann	0	7^{7}	[6]
(Spain) S Martos Gornés (India) VS Prashanth	6	6^{3}	[10]
(Venezuela) LD Martínez (Argentina) F Mena	6	6
(Bulgaria) A Donski (Spain) B Pujol Navarro	2	2
(Romania) A Jecan (Romania) B Pavel	7^{7}	4	[10]
2	(Romania) V Cornea (Poland) K Drzewiecki	6^{4}	6	[7]

Semifinals
1	(Netherlands) M Middelkoop (Netherlands) J-J Rojer	7^{7}	6^{6}	[7]
(Spain) S Martos Gornés (India) VS Prashanth	6^{3}	7^{8}	[10]
(Venezuela) LD Martínez (Argentina) F Mena	4	2
(Romania) A Jecan (Romania) B Pavel	6	6

Final
(Spain) S Martos Gornés (India) VS Prashanth	2	7	[10]
(Romania) A Jecan (Romania) B Pavel	6	5	[8]
