= 2026 Lima Challenger – Doubles =

Doubles
- 2026 Lima Challenger

Final
- Champions: (Argentina) Facundo Bagnis (Argentina) Facundo Mena
- Runners-up: (Poland) Karol Drzewiecki (Poland) Piotr Matuszewski
- Score: 4–6, 6–4, [10–3]

Events
Singles	Doubles
- Lima Challenger

Marcelo Demoliner and Orlando Luz were the defending champions but chose not to defend their title.

Facundo Bagnis and Facundo Mena won the title after defeating Karol Drzewiecki and Piotr Matuszewski 4–6, 6–4, [10–3] in the final.

== Seeds ==
1. (Ecuador) Diego Hidalgo / (Argentina) Andrés Molteni (quarterfinals)
2. (Poland) Karol Drzewiecki / (Poland) Piotr Matuszewski (final)
3. (Mexico) Alan Magadán / (Bolivia) Federico Zeballos (first round)
4. (Bolivia) Boris Arias / (Uruguay) Ignacio Carou (quarterfinals)

== Draw ==
Key

- Q = Qualifier
- WC = Wild card
- LL = Lucky loser
- Alt = Alternate
- ITF = ITF entry
- PR = Protected ranking
- SR = Special ranking
- SE = Special exempt
- JE = Junior exempt
- JR = Junior Accelerator Programme entrant
- CO = College Accelerator Programme entrant
- NG = Next Gen Accelerator Program entrant
- w/o = Walkover
- r = Retired
- d = Defaulted

First round
1	(Ecuador) D Hidalgo (Argentina) A Molteni	w/o
(Peru) A Huertas del Pino (Peru) A Merino
(Brazil) JL Reis da Silva (Uruguay) F Roncadelli	2	3
(Spain) D Rincón (Spain) O Roca Batalla	6	6
3	(Mexico) A Magadán (Bolivia) F Zeballos	4	6^{4}
Alt	(Switzerland) J Nikles (Spain) C Sánchez Jover	6	7^{7}
(Argentina) S de la Fuente (Argentina) GA Olivieri	6	4	[4]
WC	(Argentina) F Bagnis (Argentina) F Mena	3	6	[10]
(Colombia) N Barrientos (Colombia) JS Gómez	w/o
(Spain) M Alcalá Gurri (Spain) N Sánchez Izquierdo
WC	(Peru) Franco Dávila Blotte (Peru) Diego Gómez	2	4
4	(Bolivia) B Arias (Uruguay) I Carou	6	6
(United States) T Boyer (Netherlands) Ryan Nijboer	4	5
(Brazil) Bruno Oliveira (Brazil) Natan Rodrigues	6	7
(Czech Republic) Z Kolář (Brazil) M Zormann	4	3
2	(Poland) K Drzewiecki (Poland) P Matuszewski	6	6

Quarterfinals
1	(Ecuador) D Hidalgo (Argentina) A Molteni	7^{9}	4	[9]
(Spain) D Rincón (Spain) O Roca Batalla	6^{7}	6	[11]
Alt	(Switzerland) J Nikles (Spain) C Sánchez Jover	3	2
WC	(Argentina) F Bagnis (Argentina) F Mena	6	6
(Colombia) N Barrientos (Colombia) JS Gómez	6	4	[10]
4	(Bolivia) B Arias (Uruguay) I Carou	4	6	[7]
(Brazil) B Oliveira (Brazil) N Rodrigues	3	6	[4]
2	(Poland) K Drzewiecki (Poland) P Matuszewski	6	4	[10]

Semifinals
(Spain) D Rincón (Spain) O Roca Batalla	2	2
WC	(Argentina) F Bagnis (Argentina) F Mena	6	6
(Colombia) N Barrientos (Colombia) JS Gómez	7^{7}	3	[7]
2	(Poland) K Drzewiecki (Poland) P Matuszewski	6^{1}	6	[10]

Final
WC	(Argentina) F Bagnis (Argentina) F Mena	4	6	[10]
2	(Poland) K Drzewiecki (Poland) P Matuszewski	6	4	[3]
