= 2025 Brasil Tennis Open =

- Date: 28 April – 4 May
- Edition: 2nd
- Surface: Clay
- Location: Porto Alegre, Brazil

Champions

Singles
- (Argentina) Santiago Rodríguez Taverna

Doubles
- (Bolivia) Juan Carlos Prado Ángelo / (Bolivia) Federico Zeballos
- Brasil Tennis Open

The 2025 Brasil Tennis Open was a professional tennis tournament played on clay courts. It was the second edition of the tournament which was part of the 2025 ATP Challenger Tour. It took place in Porto Alegre, Brazil between 28 April and 4 May 2025.

== Singles main-draw entrants ==
=== Seeds ===
Country	Player	Rank^{1}	Seed
ECU	Álvaro Guillén Meza	205	1
BOL	Murkel Dellien	222	2
ARG	Santiago Rodríguez Taverna	261	3
ARG	Juan Bautista Torres	273	4
BOL	Juan Carlos Prado Ángelo	291	5
ARG	Genaro Alberto Olivieri	302	6
BRA	Daniel Dutra da Silva	304	7
ESP	Nicolás Álvarez Varona	309	8

^{1} Rankings are as of 21 April 2025.

=== Other entrants ===
The following players received wildcards into the singles main draw:

- (Brazil) Vicente Freda
- (Brazil) Luís Miguel
- (Brazil) Eduardo Ribeiro

The following player received entry into the singles main draw using a protected ranking:

- (Jamaica) Blaise Bicknell

The following player received entry into the singles main draw as a special exempt:

- (Argentina) Alex Barrena

The following player received entry into the singles main draw as an alternate:

- (Brazil) João Lucas Reis da Silva

The following players received entry from the qualifying draw:

- (Argentina) Leonardo Aboian
- (Argentina) Valerio Aboian
- (Argentina) Luciano Emanuel Ambrogi
- (Argentina) Hernán Casanova
- (Peru) Conner Huertas del Pino
- (Argentina) Nicolás Kicker

The following player received entry as a lucky loser:

- (United States) Bruno Kuzuhara

== Champions ==
=== Singles ===
- (Argentina) Santiago Rodríguez Taverna def. (Spain) Nikolás Sánchez Izquierdo 4–6, 6–4, 7–6^{(8–6)}.

=== Doubles ===
- (Bolivia) Juan Carlos Prado Ángelo / (Bolivia) Federico Zeballos def. (Argentina) Lautaro Midón / (Argentina) Gonzalo Villanueva 7–5, 7–5.
