= 2026 Szczecin Open =

- Date: 14–20 September
- Edition: 33rd
- Surface: Clay
- Location: Szczecin, Poland

Champions

Singles
- (Spain) Nikolás Sánchez Izquierdo

Doubles
- (Czech Republic) Andrew Paulson / (Portugal) Tiago Pereira
- Szczecin Open

The 2026 Invest in Szczecin Open was a professional tennis tournament played on clay courts. It was the 33rd edition of the tournament which was part of the 2026 ATP Challenger Tour. It took place in Szczecin, Poland between 14 and 20 September 2026.

== Singles main-draw entrants ==
=== Seeds ===
Country	Player	Rank^{1}	Seed
ARG	Facundo Díaz Acosta	82	1
ARG	Marco Trungelliti	83	2
GER	Tom Gentzsch	145	3
ITA	Stefano Travaglia	147	4
ITA	Marco Cecchinato	166	5
SRB	Dušan Lajović	167	6
CZE	Zdeněk Kolář	175	7
CRO	Luka Mikrut	176	8

^{1} Rankings are as of 31 August 2026.

=== Other entrants ===
The following players received wildcards into the singles main draw:

- (Poland) Kacper Knitter
- (Poland) Daniel Michalski
- (Poland) Alan Ważny

The following players received entry into the singles main draw as alternates:

- (Colombia) Daniel Elahi Galán
- (Brazil) Thiago Monteiro

The following players received entry from the qualifying draw:

- Ivan Gakhov
- (Switzerland) Johan Nikles
- (Portugal) Tiago Pereira
- (Poland) Filip Pieczonka
- (Latvia) Robert Strombachs
- (Germany) Kai Wehnelt

The following player received entry as a lucky loser:

- (United States) Dali Blanch

== Champions ==
=== Singles ===
- (Spain) Nikolás Sánchez Izquierdo def. (Brazil) Thiago Monteiro 4–6, 6–3, 7–6^{(8–6)}.

=== Doubles ===
- (Czech Republic) Andrew Paulson / (Portugal) Tiago Pereira def. (Spain) Íñigo Cervantes / (Ukraine) Denys Molchanov 6–2, 6–0.
