= 2023 Poznań Open =

Professional tennis tournament

- Date: 19 – 24 June
- Edition: 19th
- Surface: Clay
- Location: Poznań, Poland
- Venue: Park Tenisowy Olimpia

Champions

Singles
- (Argentina) Mariano Navone

Doubles
- (Poland) Karol Drzewiecki / (Czech Republic) Petr Nouza
| ← 2022 · | Poznań Open | · 2024 → |

The 2023 Enea Poznań Open was a professional tennis tournament played on clay courts. It was the 19th edition of the tournament which was part of the 2023 ATP Challenger Tour. It took place at the Park Tenisowy Olimpia in Poznań, Poland from 19 to 24 June 2023.

== Singles main-draw entrants ==
=== Seeds ===
| Country | Player | Rank^{1} | Seed |
|---|---|---|---|
| | Alexander Shevchenko | 92 | 1 |
| ARG | Federico Coria | 93 | 2 |
| CZE | Tomáš Macháč | 110 | 3 |
| ARG | Facundo Díaz Acosta | 115 | 4 |
| CHI | Tomás Barrios Vera | 161 | 5 |
| FRA | Geoffrey Blancaneaux | 166 | 6 |
| BIH | Damir Džumhur | 167 | 7 |
| CZE | Dalibor Svrčina | 192 | 8 |

- ^{1} Rankings are as of 12 June 2023.

=== Other entrants ===
The following players received wildcards into the singles main draw:

- (United States) Dali Blanch
- (Sweden) Leo Borg
- (Poland) Maks Kaśnikowski

The following players received entry into the singles main draw as alternates:

- (Netherlands) Max Houkes
- (Germany) Timo Stodder

The following players received entry from the qualifying draw:

- (United States) Ulises Blanch
- (France) Manuel Guinard
- (Spain) David Jordà Sanchis
- (Switzerland) Jérôme Kym
- (Germany) Rudolf Molleker
- (Austria) Neil Oberleitner

The following player received entry as a lucky loser:

- (Spain) Carlos Taberner

== Champions ==
=== Singles ===
- (Argentina) Mariano Navone def. (Chile) Tomás Barrios Vera 7–5, 6–3.

=== Doubles ===
- (Poland) Karol Drzewiecki / (Czech Republic) Petr Nouza def. (Uruguay) Ariel Behar / (Czech Republic) Adam Pavlásek 7–6^{(7–2)}, 7–6^{(7–2)}.
