= 2026 Lima Challenger =

- Date: 9 – 15 November
- Edition: 25th
- Surface: Clay
- Location: Lima, Peru

Champions

Singles
- (Spain) Nikolás Sánchez Izquierdo

Doubles
- (Argentina) Facundo Bagnis / (Argentina) Facundo Mena
- Lima Challenger

The 2026 Lima Challenger was a professional tennis tournament played on clay courts. It was the 25th edition of the tournament which was part of the 2026 ATP Challenger Tour. It took place in Lima, Peru at the Club Terrazas Miraflores between 9 and 15 November 2026.

== Singles main-draw entrants ==
=== Seeds ===
Country	Player	Rank^{1}	Seed
~~ARG~~	~~Camilo Ugo Carabelli~~	~~81~~	~~1~~
POR	Henrique Rocha	99	2
BOL	Hugo Dellien	107	3
~~BRA~~	~~Thiago Seyboth Wild~~	~~110~~	~~4~~
ESP	Max Alcalá Gurri	130	5
ARG	Francisco Comesaña	135	6
DEN	Elmer Møller	150	7
ESP	Nikolás Sánchez Izquierdo	151	8

- ^{1} Rankings are as of 2 November 2026.

=== Other entrants ===
The following players received wildcards into the singles main draw:

- (Peru) Arklon Huertas del Pino
- (Peru) Alessandro Rubini
- (Peru) Fabio Manuel Zavalaga Uculmana

The following player received entry into the singles main draw as a special exempt:

- (Argentina) Genaro Alberto Olivieri

The following player received entry into the singles main draw through the Next Gen Accelerator programme:

- (Colombia) Miguel Tobón

The following player received entry into the singles main draw as an alternate:

- (Brazil) Thiago Monteiro

The following players received entry from the qualifying draw:

- (Argentina) Santiago de la Fuente
- (Chile) Nicolas Jarry
- (Austria) Filip Misolic
- (Spain) Oriol Roca Batalla
- (Uruguay) Franco Roncadelli
- (Japan) Ryo Tabata

The following players received entry as lucky losers:

- (Mexico) Alan Magadán
- (Spain) Carlos Sánchez Jover

== Champions ==
=== Singles ===
- (Spain) Nikolás Sánchez Izquierdo def. (Uruguay) Franco Roncadelli 7–6^{(7–4)}, 7–5.

=== Doubles ===
- (Argentina) Facundo Bagnis / (Argentina) Facundo Mena def. (Poland) Karol Drzewiecki / (Poland) Piotr Matuszewski 4–6, 6–4, [10–3].
