= 2026 Ostra Group Open – Doubles =

Doubles
- 2026 Ostra Group Open

Final
- Champions: (Spain) Sergio Martos Gornés (Poland) Szymon Walków
- Runners-up: (Poland) Karol Drzewiecki (Poland) Piotr Matuszewski
- Score: 6–7^{(3–7)}, 7–5, [10–8]

Events
Singles	Doubles
- Ostra Group Open

Jan Jermář and Stefan Latinović were the defending champions but only Jermář chose to defend his title, partnering Jan Hrazdil. They lost in the first round to Siddhant Banthia and Alexander Donski.

Sergio Martos Gornés and Szymon Walków won the title after defeating Karol Drzewiecki and Piotr Matuszewski 6–7^{(3–7)}, 7–5, [10–8] in the final.

== Seeds ==
1. (India) Siddhant Banthia / (Bulgaria) Alexander Donski (quarterfinals)
2. (Poland) Karol Drzewiecki / (Poland) Piotr Matuszewski (final)
3. (Czech Republic) Filip Duda / (Czech Republic) David Poljak (first round)
4. (Spain) Sergio Martos Gornés / (Poland) Szymon Walków (champions)

== Draw ==
Key

- Q = Qualifier
- WC = Wild card
- LL = Lucky loser
- Alt = Alternate
- ITF = ITF entry
- PR = Protected ranking
- SR = Special ranking
- SE = Special exempt
- JE = Junior exempt
- JR = Junior Accelerator Programme entrant
- CO = College Accelerator Programme entrant
- NG = Next Gen Accelerator Program entrant
- w/o = Walkover
- r = Retired
- d = Defaulted

First round
1	(India) S Banthia (Bulgaria) A Donski	6	7
WC	(Czech Republic) Jan Hrazdil (Czech Republic) J Jermář	2	5
(Bosnia and Herzegovina) M Bašić (Bosnia and Herzegovina) N Fatić	7^{7}	4	[5]
(Netherlands) J Jans (United Kingdom) M Whitehouse	6^{1}	6	[10]
4	(Spain) S Martos Gornés (Poland) S Walków	1	6	[10]
(Serbia) I Sabanov (Serbia) M Sabanov	6	3	[8]
(United Kingdom) F Bass (Bulgaria) A Genov	7^{7}	6
(United Kingdom) J Clarke (Poland) D Michalski	6^{5}	3
(Netherlands) M Hermans (Czech Republic) Jakub Nicod	6	6
WC	(Czech Republic) Jan Klimas (Czech Republic) Denis Peták	4	4
(Czech Republic) Z Kolář (Czech Republic) M Mrva	6	6
3	(Czech Republic) F Duda (Czech Republic) D Poljak	2	3
(Italy) R Brancaccio (Spain) C Sánchez Jover	1	2^{r}
(Czech Republic) H Bartoň (United States) G Johns	6	5
(Czech Republic) D Reček (Czech Republic) D Siniakov	2	3
2	(Poland) K Drzewiecki (Poland) P Matuszewski	6	6

Quarterfinals
1	(India) S Banthia (Bulgaria) A Donski	6^{5}	6	[11]
(Netherlands) J Jans (United Kingdom) M Whitehouse	7^{7}	3	[13]
4	(Spain) S Martos Gornés (Poland) S Walków	6	6
(United Kingdom) F Bass (Bulgaria) A Genov	2	2
(Netherlands) M Hermans (Czech Republic) J Nicod	4	6	[11]
(Czech Republic) Z Kolář (Czech Republic) M Mrva	6	4	[9]
(Czech Republic) H Bartoň (United States) G Johns	3	6	[7]
2	(Poland) K Drzewiecki (Poland) P Matuszewski	6	3	[10]

Semifinals
(Netherlands) J Jans (United Kingdom) M Whitehouse	4	7	[8]
4	(Spain) S Martos Gornés (Poland) S Walków	6	5	[10]
(Netherlands) M Hermans (Czech Republic) J Nicod	3	7^{10}	[7]
2	(Poland) K Drzewiecki (Poland) P Matuszewski	6	6^{8}	[10]

Final
4	(Spain) S Martos Gornés (Poland) S Walków	6^{3}	7	[10]
2	(Poland) K Drzewiecki (Poland) P Matuszewski	7^{7}	5	[8]
