= 2026 Ostra Group Open =

- Date: 27 April – 3 May
- Edition: 23rd
- Surface: Clay
- Location: Ostrava, Czech Republic

Champions

Singles
- (Spain) Nikolás Sánchez Izquierdo

Doubles
- (Spain) Sergio Martos Gornés / (Poland) Szymon Walków
- Ostra Group Open

The 2026 Ostra Group Open was a professional tennis tournament played on clay courts. It was the 23rd edition of the tournament which was part of the 2026 ATP Challenger Tour. It took place in Ostrava, Czech Republic between 27 April and 3 May 2026.

== Singles main-draw entrants ==
=== Seeds ===
Country	Player	Rank^{1}	Seed
CZE	Dalibor Svrčina	127	1
GBR	Jack Pinnington Jones	135	2
HUN	Zsombor Piros	148	3
GBR	Toby Samuel	163	4
FRA	Ugo Blanchet	166	5
CZE	Zdeněk Kolář	182	6
ITA	Marco Cecchinato	188	7
UKR	Vitaliy Sachko	191	8

- ^{1} Rankings are as of 20 April 2026.

=== Other entrants ===
The following players received wildcards into the singles main draw:

- (Czech Republic) Hynek Bartoň
- (Czech Republic) Jan Jermář
- (Czech Republic) Maxim Mrva

The following player received entry into the singles main draw through the Junior Accelerator programme:

- (Germany) Max Schönhaus

The following players received entry into the singles main draw as alternates:

- (Romania) Filip Cristian Jianu
- (Poland) Daniel Michalski
- (Spain) Nikolás Sánchez Izquierdo

The following players received entry from the qualifying draw:

- (Czech Republic) Jonáš Forejtek
- (Slovakia) Norbert Gombos
- (United States) Garrett Johns
- (Germany) Rudolf Molleker
- (Spain) Carlos Sánchez Jover
- (Czech Republic) Daniel Siniakov

== Champions ==
=== Singles ===
- (Spain) Nikolás Sánchez Izquierdo def. (Czech Republic) Zdeněk Kolář 6–4, 7–6^{(7–4)}.

=== Doubles ===
- (Spain) Sergio Martos Gornés / (Poland) Szymon Walków def. (Poland) Karol Drzewiecki / (Poland) Piotr Matuszewski 6–7^{(3–7)}, 7–5, [10–8].
