= 2024 Brasil Tennis Open =

- Date: 29 April – 5 May
- Edition: 1st
- Surface: Clay
- Location: Porto Alegre, Brazil

Champions

Singles
- (Turkey) Ergi Kırkın

Doubles
- (Dominican Republic) Roberto Cid Subervi / (Japan) Kaichi Uchida
- Brasil Tennis Open

The 2024 Brasil Tennis Open was a professional tennis tournament played on clay courts. It was the 1st edition of the tournament which was part of the 2024 ATP Challenger Tour. It took place in Porto Alegre, Brazil between 29 April and 5 May 2024.

== Singles main-draw entrants ==
=== Seeds ===
Country	Player	Rank^{1}	Seed
FRA	Calvin Hemery	194	1
BOL	Murkel Dellien	222	2
KAZ	Dmitry Popko	234	3
VEN	Gonzalo Oliveira	243	4
BRA	João Lucas Reis da Silva	282	5
LIB	Hady Habib	290	6
ECU	Álvaro Guillén Meza	294	7
TUR	Ergi Kırkın	299	8

^{1} Rankings are as of 22 April 2024.

=== Other entrants ===
The following players received wildcards into the singles main draw:

- (Brazil) Guilherme Clezar
- (Brazil) Gustavo Ribeiro de Almeida
- (Brazil) Luís Miguel

The following players received entry into the singles main draw as alternates:

- (United States) Bruno Kuzuhara
- (Argentina) Juan Bautista Torres

The following players received entry from the qualifying draw:

- (Argentina) Leonardo Aboian
- (Brazil) Igor Gimenez
- (Argentina) Guido Iván Justo
- (Bolivia) Juan Carlos Prado Ángelo
- (Brazil) Karue Sell
- (Japan) Kaichi Uchida

The following player received entry as a lucky loser:

- (Brazil) Daniel Dutra da Silva

== Champions ==
=== Singles ===
- (Turkey) Ergi Kırkın def. (Brazil) Daniel Dutra da Silva 6–3, 7–5.

=== Doubles ===
- (Dominican Republic) Roberto Cid Subervi / (Japan) Kaichi Uchida def. (Australia) Patrick Harper / (United Kingdom) David Stevenson 5–7, 7–6^{(7–1)}, [10–6].
