= 2026 Lima Challenger – Singles =

Singles
- 2026 Lima Challenger

Final
- Champion: (Spain) Nikolás Sánchez Izquierdo
- Runner-up: (Uruguay) Franco Roncadelli
- Score: 7–6^{(7–4)}, 7–5

Events
Singles	Doubles
- Lima Challenger

Tomás Barrios Vera was the defending champion but lost in the first round to Juan Pablo Varillas.

Nikolás Sánchez Izquierdo won the title after defeating Franco Roncadelli 7–6^{(7–4)}, 7–5 in the final.

== Seeds ==
1. (Argentina) Camilo Ugo Carabelli (withdrew)
2. (Portugal) Henrique Rocha (first round)
3. (Bolivia) Hugo Dellien (first round)
4. (Brazil) Thiago Seyboth Wild (withdrew)
5. (Spain) Max Alcalá Gurri (semifinals)
6. (Argentina) Francisco Comesaña (second round, retired)
7. (Denmark) Elmer Møller (first round)
8. (Spain) Nikolás Sánchez Izquierdo (champion)

== Draw ==
Key

- Q = Qualifier
- WC = Wild card
- LL = Lucky loser
- Alt = Alternate
- ITF = ITF entry
- PR = Protected ranking
- SR = Special ranking
- SE = Special exempt
- JE = Junior exempt
- JR = Junior Accelerator Programme entrant
- CO = College Accelerator Programme entrant
- NG = Next Gen Accelerator Program entrant
- w/o = Walkover
- r = Retired
- d = Defaulted

=== Finals ===
Semifinals
Q	(Uruguay) Franco Roncadelli	6	6
5	(Spain) Max Alcalá Gurri	1	2
(Brazil) João Lucas Reis da Silva
8	(Spain) Nikolás Sánchez Izquierdo	w/o

Final
Q	(Uruguay) Franco Roncadelli	6^{4}	5
8	(Spain) Nikolás Sánchez Izquierdo	7^{7}	7

=== Top half ===
First round
LL	(Mexico) A Magadán	3	6	6
Q	(Spain) O Roca Batalla	6	3	4
WC	(Peru) Fabio Manuel Zavalaga Uculmana	0	2
(Argentina) A Barrena	6	6
WC	(Peru) Alessandro Rubini	0	0
Q	(Uruguay) F Roncadelli	6	6
(Italy) M Cecchinato	6	1	4
6	(Argentina) F Comesaña	4	6	6
3	(Bolivia) H Dellien	4	4
(United States) T Boyer	6	6
(Bolivia) JC Prado Ángelo	3	6^{3}
Q	(Japan) Ryo Tabata	6	7^{7}
(Spain) D Rincón	6^{3}	6	6^{5}
Q	(Argentina) S de la Fuente	7^{7}	3	7^{7}
(Argentina) F Mena	6	2	1
5	(Spain) M Alcalá Gurri	3	6	6

Second round
LL	(Mexico) A Magadán	3	7^{7}	4
(Argentina) A Barrena	6	6^{5}	0^{r}
Q	(Uruguay) F Roncadelli	6^{5}	6	4
6	(Argentina) F Comesaña	7^{7}	4	1^{r}
(United States) T Boyer	7	6
Q	(Japan) R Tabata	5	2
Q	(Argentina) S de la Fuente	1	3
5	(Spain) M Alcalá Gurri	6	6

Quarterfinals
LL	(Mexico) A Magadán	6	4	0
Q	(Uruguay) F Roncadelli	1	6	6
(United States) T Boyer	6	6^{0}	2
5	(Spain) M Alcalá Gurri	3	7^{7}	6

Semifinals
Q	(Uruguay) F Roncadelli	6	6
5	(Spain) M Alcalá Gurri	1	2

=== Bottom half ===
First round
7	(Denmark) E Møller	4	6	4
SE	(Argentina) GA Olivieri	6	2	6
(Peru) JP Varillas	4	6	6
(Chile) T Barrios Vera	6	3	4
(Czech Republic) Z Kolář	5	3
(Brazil) JL Reis da Silva	7	6
(Peru) G Bueno	6	2	6
LL	(Spain) C Sánchez Jover	0	6	4
8	(Spain) N Sánchez Izquierdo	7^{7}	4	7
Q	(Chile) N Jarry	6^{2}	6	5
Alt	(Brazil) T Monteiro	6^{2}	3
Q	(Austria) F Misolic	7^{7}	6
WC	(Peru) A Huertas del Pino	4	6	2
(Argentina) L Midón	6	3	6
NG	(Colombia) Miguel Tobón	7^{8}	6
2	(Portugal) H Rocha	6^{6}	1

Second round
SE	(Argentina) GA Olivieri	4	6	6
(Peru) JP Varillas	6	3	3
(Brazil) JL Reis da Silva	7	7^{7}
(Peru) G Bueno	5	6^{3}
8	(Spain) N Sánchez Izquierdo	2	7^{7}	7
Q	(Austria) F Misolic	6	6^{3}	5
(Argentina) L Midón	3	1^{r}
NG	(Colombia) M Tobón	6	1

Quarterfinals
SE	(Argentina) GA Olivieri	2	3
(Brazil) JL Reis da Silva	6	6
8	(Spain) N Sánchez Izquierdo	6^{7}	6	6
NG	(Colombia) M Tobón	7^{9}	4	2

Semifinals
(Brazil) JL Reis da Silva
8	(Spain) N Sánchez Izquierdo	w/o
