= 2026 Ostra Group Open – Singles =

Singles
- 2026 Ostra Group Open

Final
- Champion: (Spain) Nikolás Sánchez Izquierdo
- Runner-up: (Czech Republic) Zdeněk Kolář
- Score: 6–4, 7–6^{(7–4)}

Events
Singles	Doubles
- Ostra Group Open

Zsombor Piros was the defending champion but lost in the second round to Tom Gentzsch.

Nikolás Sánchez Izquierdo won the title after defeating Zdeněk Kolář 6–4, 7–6^{(7–4)} in the final.

== Seeds ==
1. (Czech Republic) Dalibor Svrčina (quarterfinals)
2. (United Kingdom) Jack Pinnington Jones (first round)
3. (Hungary) Zsombor Piros (second round)
4. (United Kingdom) Toby Samuel (first round)
5. (France) Ugo Blanchet (first round)
6. (Czech Republic) Zdeněk Kolář (final)
7. (Italy) Marco Cecchinato (quarterfinals)
8. (Ukraine) Vitaliy Sachko (second round)

== Draw ==
Key

- Q = Qualifier
- WC = Wild card
- LL = Lucky loser
- Alt = Alternate
- ITF = ITF entry
- PR = Protected ranking
- SR = Special ranking
- SE = Special exempt
- JE = Junior exempt
- JR = Junior Accelerator Programme entrant
- CO = College Accelerator Programme entrant
- NG = Next Gen Accelerator Program entrant
- w/o = Walkover
- r = Retired
- d = Defaulted

=== Finals ===
Semifinals
Alt	(Spain) Nikolás Sánchez Izquierdo	3	6	6
(Germany) Tom Gentzsch	6	4	1
(Italy) Raúl Brancaccio	3	5
6	(Czech Republic) Zdeněk Kolář	6	7

Final
Alt	(Spain) Nikolás Sánchez Izquierdo	6	7^{7}
6	(Czech Republic) Zdeněk Kolář	4	6^{4}

=== Top half ===
First round
1	(Czech Republic) D Svrčina	6^{6}	6	6
(United Kingdom) F Gill	7^{8}	1	3
Q	(Spain) C Sánchez Jover	2	7^{7}	6^{5}
(Portugal) F Ferreira Silva	6	6^{5}	7^{7}
Alt	(Spain) N Sánchez Izquierdo	7^{7}	6
WC	(Czech Republic) M Mrva	6^{3}	3
(France) L Pavlovic	4	6	4
8	(Ukraine) V Sachko	6	2	6
3	(Hungary) Z Piros	6	6
(Netherlands) M Houkes	4	3
(Germany) T Gentzsch	6	6
(United Kingdom) G Loffhagen	3	2
Q	(Germany) R Molleker	7^{7}	6
Q	(Czech Republic) D Siniakov	6^{4}	0
(Germany) H Squire	6	6
5	(France) U Blanchet	2	4

Second round
1	(Czech Republic) D Svrčina	6	6
(Portugal) F Ferreira Silva	3	4
Alt	(Spain) N Sánchez Izquierdo	6^{7}	7	6
8	(Ukraine) V Sachko	7^{9}	5	4
3	(Hungary) Z Piros	4	7^{9}	5
(Germany) T Gentzsch	6	6^{7}	7
Q	(Germany) R Molleker	6	4	6
(Germany) H Squire	4	6	3

Quarterfinals
1	(Czech Republic) D Svrčina	4	7	2
Alt	(Spain) N Sánchez Izquierdo	6	5	6
(Germany) T Gentzsch	6	4	6
Q	(Germany) R Molleker	1	6	3

Semifinals
Alt	(Spain) N Sánchez Izquierdo	3	6	6
(Germany) T Gentzsch	6	4	1

=== Bottom half ===
First round
7	(Italy) M Cecchinato	6	6
Alt	(Poland) D Michalski	3	2
WC	(Czech Republic) J Jermář	1	3
Q	(United States) G Johns	6	6
JR	(Germany) M Schönhaus	6	3	5
(United Kingdom) J Clarke	3	6	7
(Italy) R Brancaccio	5	6	6
4	(United Kingdom) T Samuel	7	1	4
6	(Czech Republic) Z Kolář	6	2	6
Alt	(Romania) FC Jianu	3	6	3
Q	(Czech Republic) J Forejtek	6^{4}	6	7^{7}
WC	(Czech Republic) H Bartoň	7^{7}	1	6^{5}
(Brazil) T Seyboth Wild	6	6^{5}	6
Q	(Slovakia) N Gombos	3	7^{7}	1
(Bosnia and Herzegovina) N Fatić	6	7
2	(United Kingdom) J Pinnington Jones	2	5

Second round
7	(Italy) M Cecchinato	6	7^{7}
Q	(United States) G Johns	3	6^{3}
(United Kingdom) J Clarke	3	4
(Italy) R Brancaccio	6	6
6	(Czech Republic) Z Kolář	6	6
Q	(Czech Republic) J Forejtek	4	3
(Brazil) T Seyboth Wild	7	5	4
(Bosnia and Herzegovina) N Fatić	5	7	6

Quarterfinals
7	(Italy) M Cecchinato	6	4	4
(Italy) R Brancaccio	4	6	6
6	(Czech Republic) Z Kolář	6	6
(Bosnia and Herzegovina) N Fatić	2	3

Semifinals
(Italy) R Brancaccio	3	5
6	(Czech Republic) Z Kolář	6	7
