= 2023 Poznań Open – Singles =

Singles
- 2023 Poznań Open

Final
- Champion: (Argentina) Mariano Navone
- Runner-up: (Chile) Tomás Barrios Vera
- Score: 7–5, 6–3

Events
| Singles | Doubles |
- Poznań Open

Arthur Rinderknech was the defending champion but chose not to defend his title.

Mariano Navone won the title after defeating Tomás Barrios Vera 7–5, 6–3 in the final.

== Seeds ==
1. Alexander Shevchenko (first round)
2. (Argentina) Federico Coria (first round)
3. (Czech Republic) Tomáš Macháč (first round)
4. (Argentina) Facundo Díaz Acosta (quarterfinals)
5. (Chile) Tomás Barrios Vera (final)
6. (France) Geoffrey Blancaneaux (first round, retired)
7. (Bosnia and Herzegovina) Damir Džumhur (first round)
8. (Czech Republic) Dalibor Svrčina (first round)

== Draw ==
Key

- Q = Qualifier
- WC = Wild card
- LL = Lucky loser
- Alt = Alternate
- ITF = ITF entry
- PR = Protected ranking
- SR = Special ranking
- SE = Special exempt
- JE = Junior exempt
- JR = Junior Accelerator Programme entrant
- CO = College Accelerator Programme entrant
- NG = Next Gen Accelerator Program entrant
- w/o = Walkover
- r = Retired
- d = Defaulted

=== Finals ===
Semifinals
5 | (Chile) Tomás Barrios Vera | 6 | 1 | 6
(Czech Republic) Zdeněk Kolář | 4 | 6 | 3
Alt | (Germany) Timo Stodder | 2 | 0
(Argentina) Mariano Navone | 6 | 6

Final
5 | (Chile) Tomás Barrios Vera | 5 | 3
(Argentina) Mariano Navone | 7 | 6

=== Top half ===
First round
1 | A Shevchenko | 3 | 2
WC | (United States) Dali Blanch | 6 | 6
Q | (United States) U Blanch | 7^{7} | 0
(Ukraine) V Sachko | 6^{5} | 0^{r}
(France) G Mpetshi Perricard | 7^{10} | 3 | 7^{13}
(Czech Republic) J Menšík | 6^{8} | 6 | 6^{11}
Alt | (Netherlands) M Houkes | 1 | 6^{2}
5 | (Chile) T Barrios Vera | 6 | 7^{7}
4 | (Argentina) F Díaz Acosta | 3 | 6 | 6
(Italy) L Giustino | 6 | 2 | 4
(India) S Nagal | 6 | 6
WC | (Sweden) L Borg | 2 | 3
LL | (Spain) C Taberner | 6 | 7^{7}
(Poland) K Żuk | 4 | 6^{3}
(Czech Republic) Z Kolář | 6 | 6
7 | (Bosnia and Herzegovina) D Džumhur | 2 | 2

Second round
WC | (United States) Dal Blanch | 6 | 3 | 4
Q | (United States) U Blanch | 1 | 6 | 6
(France) G Mpetshi Perricard | 6^{2} | 3
5 | (Chile) T Barrios Vera | 7^{7} | 6
4 | (Argentina) F Díaz Acosta | 6 | 2 | 6
(India) S Nagal | 1 | 6 | 4
LL | (Spain) C Taberner | 4 | 1
(Czech Republic) Z Kolář | 6 | 6

Quarterfinals
Q | (United States) U Blanch | 3 | 7 | 5
5 | (Chile) T Barrios Vera | 6 | 5 | 7
4 | (Argentina) F Díaz Acosta | 3 | 1
(Czech Republic) Z Kolář | 6 | 6

Semifinals
5 | (Chile) T Barrios Vera | 6 | 1 | 6
(Czech Republic) Z Kolář | 4 | 6 | 3

=== Bottom half ===
First round
8 | (Czech Republic) D Svrčina | 5 | 6^{4}
(Spain) P Martín Tiffon | 7 | 7^{7}
Q | (Spain) D Jordà Sanchis | 6^{2} | 3
Alt | (Germany) Timo Stodder | 7^{7} | 6
(Poland) D Michalski | 5 | 6 | 6
(Hungary) M Valkusz | 7 | 4 | 1
Q | (Germany) R Molleker | 7 | 7^{7}
3 | (Czech Republic) T Macháč | 5 | 6^{1}
6 | (France) G Blancaneaux | 2 | 3^{r}
Q | (France) M Guinard | 6 | 4
Q | (Switzerland) J Kym | 6 | 6
Q | (Austria) N Oberleitner | 1 | 2
WC | (Poland) M Kaśnikowski | 6 | 2 | 7^{7}
(Switzerland) H Laaksonen | 1 | 6 | 6^{4}
(Argentina) M Navone | 3 | 6 | 6
2 | (Argentina) F Coria | 6 | 3 | 1

Second round
(Spain) P Martín Tiffon | 4 | 6 | 0
Alt | (Germany) T Stodder | 6 | 3 | 6
(Poland) D Michalski | 6 | 6
Q | (Germany) R Molleker | 4 | 2
Q | (France) M Guinard | 6 | 6
Q | (Switzerland) J Kym | 3 | 4
WC | (Poland) M Kaśnikowski | 4 | 6^{4}
(Argentina) M Navone | 6 | 7^{7}

Quarterfinals
Alt | (Germany) T Stodder | 6 | 6
(Poland) D Michalski | 1 | 4
Q | (France) M Guinard | 5 | 7^{7} | 2
(Argentina) M Navone | 7 | 6^{3} | 6

Semifinals
Alt | (Germany) T Stodder | 2 | 0
(Argentina) M Navone | 6 | 6
