= 2023 Poznań Open – Doubles =

Doubles
- 2023 Poznań Open

Final
- Champions: (Poland) Karol Drzewiecki (Czech Republic) Petr Nouza
- Runners-up: (Uruguay) Ariel Behar (Czech Republic) Adam Pavlásek
- Score: 7–6^{(7–2)}, 7–6^{(7–2)}

Events
Singles	Doubles
- Poznań Open

Hunter Reese and Szymon Walków were the defending champions but only Walków chose to defend his title, partnering Łukasz Kubot. Walków lost in the first round to Lorenzo Giustino and Sumit Nagal.

Karol Drzewiecki and Petr Nouza won the title after defeating Ariel Behar and Adam Pavlásek 7–6^{(7–2)}, 7–6^{(7–2)} in the final.

== Seeds ==
1. (Uruguay) Ariel Behar / (Czech Republic) Adam Pavlásek (final)
2. (Greece) Petros Tsitsipas / (Netherlands) Sem Verbeek (semifinals)
3. Ivan Liutarevich / (Ukraine) Vladyslav Manafov (semifinals)
4. (Poland) Karol Drzewiecki / (Czech Republic) Petr Nouza (champions)

== Draw ==
Key

- Q = Qualifier
- WC = Wild card
- LL = Lucky loser
- Alt = Alternate
- ITF = ITF entry
- PR = Protected ranking
- SR = Special ranking
- SE = Special exempt
- JE = Junior exempt
- JR = Junior Accelerator Programme entrant
- CO = College Accelerator Programme entrant
- NG = Next Gen Accelerator Program entrant
- w/o = Walkover
- r = Retired
- d = Defaulted

First round
1	(Uruguay) A Behar (Czech Republic) A Pavlásek	6	6
(Philippines) R Gonzales (Slovakia) I Zelenay	4	0
(Poland) Ł Kubot (Poland) S Walków	6^{3}	7^{7}	[6]
(Italy) L Giustino (India) S Nagal	7^{7}	6^{2}	[10]
3	I Liutarevich (Ukraine) V Manafov	6	6
(Austria) N Oberleitner (Germany) T Sandkaulen	3	4
(Argentina) M Navone (Spain) C Sánchez Jover	0	6	[14]
Alt	(Netherlands) M Hermans (Netherlands) M Houkes	6	4	[12]
(Poland) D Michalski (Poland) K Żuk	w/o
(Austria) D Pichler (Ukraine) V Sachko
WC	(United States) Dali Blanch (United States) U Blanch	4	7	[8]
4	(Poland) K Drzewiecki (Czech Republic) P Nouza	6	5	[10]
(Poland) P Matuszewski (Germany) K Wehnelt	6	6
WC	(Sweden) L Borg (Poland) Borys Zgoła	2	2
(Peru) A Merino (Germany) C Negritu	7^{8}	3	[8]
2	(Greece) Pe Tsitsipas (Netherlands) S Verbeek	6^{6}	6	[10]

Quarterfinals
1	(Uruguay) A Behar (Czech Republic) A Pavlásek	6	6
(Italy) L Giustino (India) S Nagal	3	3
3	I Liutarevich (Ukraine) V Manafov	7^{7}	6
(Argentina) M Navone (Spain) C Sánchez Jover	6^{3}	4
(Poland) D Michalski (Poland) K Żuk	3	4
4	(Poland) K Drzewiecki (Czech Republic) P Nouza	6	6
(Poland) P Matuszewski (Germany) K Wehnelt	6	3	[7]
2	(Greece) Pe Tsitsipas (Netherlands) S Verbeek	4	6	[10]

Semifinals
1	(Uruguay) A Behar (Czech Republic) A Pavlásek	3	7	[11]
3	I Liutarevich (Ukraine) V Manafov	6	5	[9]
4	(Poland) K Drzewiecki (Czech Republic) P Nouza	6^{1}	6	[10]
2	(Greece) Pe Tsitsipas (Netherlands) S Verbeek	7^{7}	2	[5]

Final
1	(Uruguay) A Behar (Czech Republic) A Pavlásek	6^{2}	6^{2}
4	(Poland) K Drzewiecki (Czech Republic) P Nouza	7^{7}	7^{7}
