= 2025 Poznań Open =

Professional tennis tournament

- Date: 16 – 21 June
- Edition: 21st
- Surface: Clay
- Location: Poznań, Poland
- Venue: Park Tenisowy Olimpia

Champions

Singles
- (Austria) Filip Misolic

Doubles
- (Spain) Sergio Martos Gornés / (India) Vijay Sundar Prashanth
- Poznań Open

The 2025 Enea Poznań Open was a professional tennis tournament played on clay courts. It was the 21st edition of the tournament, which was part of the 2025 ATP Challenger Tour. It took place at Park Tenisowy Olimpia in Poznań, Poland, from 16 to 21 June 2025.

== Singles main-draw entrants ==
=== Seeds ===
Country	Player	Rank^{1}	Seed
CHI	Cristian Garín	122	1
ARG	Thiago Agustín Tirante	125	2
CZE	Dalibor Svrčina	126	3
AUT	Filip Misolic	140	4
~~POR~~	~~Henrique Rocha~~	~~149~~	~~5~~
~~ITA~~	~~Andrea Pellegrino~~	~~173~~	~~6~~
AUT	Jurij Rodionov	201	7
ARG	Facundo Mena	208	8
KAZ	Timofey Skatov	214	9

- ^{1} Rankings are as of 9 June 2025.

=== Other entrants ===
The following players received wildcards into the singles main draw:

- (Poland) Tomasz Berkieta
- (Poland) Alan Ważny
- (Egypt) Fares Zakaria

The following players received entry into the singles main draw as alternates:

- (Poland) Daniel Michalski
- Alexey Vatutin

The following players received entry from the qualifying draw:

- (Germany) Diego Dedura
- (United States) Toby Kodat
- (Czech Republic) Zdeněk Kolář
- (Czech Republic) Martin Krumich
- (Germany) Rudolf Molleker
- (Czech Republic) Maxim Mrva

The following players received entry as lucky losers:

- (Spain) Nicolás Álvarez Varona
- (Czech Republic) Hynek Bartoň

== Champions ==
=== Singles ===
- (Austria) Filip Misolic def. (Czech Republic) Dalibor Svrčina 6–2, 6–0.

=== Doubles ===
- (Spain) Sergio Martos Gornés / (India) Vijay Sundar Prashanth def. (Romania) Alexandru Jecan / (Romania) Bogdan Pavel 2–6, 7–5, [10–8].
