= Brasil Tennis Open =

- 2025 Brasil Tennis Open

ATP Challenger Tour
- Event name: Brasil Tennis Open
- Location: Porto Alegre, Brazil
- Venue: Associação Leopoldina Juvenil
- Category: ATP Challenger Tour
- Surface: Clay
- Website: Website

The Brasil Tennis Open is a professional tennis tournament played on clay courts. It is currently part of the ATP Challenger Tour. It was first held in Porto Alegre, Brazil in 2024.

== Past finals ==
=== Singles ===
Year	Champion	Runner-up	Score
2026	Not held		
2025	(Argentina) Santiago Rodríguez Taverna	(Spain) Nikolás Sánchez Izquierdo	4–6, 6–4, 7–6^{(8–6)}
2024	(Turkey) Ergi Kırkın	(Brazil) Daniel Dutra da Silva	6–3, 7–5

=== Doubles ===
Year	Champions	Runners-up	Score
2026	Not held		
2025	(Bolivia) Juan Carlos Prado Ángelo (Bolivia) Federico Zeballos	(Argentina) Lautaro Midón (Argentina) Gonzalo Villanueva	7–5, 7–5
2024	(Dominican Republic) Roberto Cid Subervi (Japan) Kaichi Uchida	(Australia) Patrick Harper (United Kingdom) David Stevenson	5–7, 7–6^{(7–1)}, [10–6]
