= Ergi Kırkın =

Turkish tennis player (born 1999)

- Country (sports): Turkey
- Residence: Ankara, Turkey
- Born: 27 January 1999 (age 27) Ankara, Turkey
- Height: 1.80 m (5 ft 11 in)
- Plays: Right-handed (two-handed backhand)
- Prize money: US $235,019

Singles
- Career record: 3–4 (at ATP Tour level, Grand Slam level, and in Davis Cup)
- Career titles: 0
- Highest ranking: No. 251 (6 May 2024)
- Current ranking: No. 646 (19 October 2026)

Doubles
- Career record: 3–3 (at ATP Tour level, Grand Slam level, and in Davis Cup)
- Career titles: 0
- Highest ranking: No. 300 (26 February 2024)
- Current ranking: No. 1,019 (19 October 2026)
- Last updated on: 19 October 2026.

Ergi Kırkın (born 27 January 1999) is a Turkish tennis player. He has a career high ATP singles ranking of world No. 251 achieved on 6 May 2024 and a career high ATP doubles ranking No. 300 achieved on 26 February 2024.. He has won 9 ITF singles titles.

== Professional career ==
=== 2018: ATP debut in doubles ===
Kırkın made his ATP main draw debut at the 2018 Antalya Open in the doubles draw partnering Koray Kırcı.

=== 2024: Maiden ATP Challenger title ===
He won his maiden ATP Challenger title at 2024 Brasil Tennis Open, after defeating Lucky Loser and local player Daniel Dutra da Silva in the final. With lifting his maiden title, he became the fourth Turkish Challenger champion joining Altug Celikbilek, Cem Ilkel and Marsel Ilhan.

== ATP Challenger Tour finals ==
=== Singles: 1 (1 title) ===
Legend ATP Challenger Tour (1–0)

Result	W–L	Date	Tournament	Tier	Surface	Opponent	Score
Win	1–0	May 2024	Porto Alegre, Brazil	Challenger	Clay	(Brazil) Daniel Dutra da Silva	6–3, 7–5

=== Doubles: 5 (5 runner-ups) ===
Legend ATP Challenger Tour (0–5)

Result	W–L	Date	Tournament	Tier	Surface	Partner	Opponents	Score
Loss	0–1	Oct 2021	Lošinj, Croatia	Challenger	Clay	(Romania) Victor Vlad Cornea	(Slovakia) Andrej Martin (Austria) Sam Weissborn	1–6, 6–7^{(5–7)}
Loss	0–2	Mar 2023	Antalya, Turkey	Challenger	Clay	(Turkey) Sarp Ağabigün	(Sweden) Filip Bergevi (Greece) Petros Tsitsipas	2–6, 4–6
Loss	0–3	Mar 2023	Székesfehérvár, Hungary	Challenger	Clay (i)	(Turkey) Sarp Ağabigün	Bogdan Bobrov (Uzbekistan) Sergey Fomin	2–6, 7–5, [9–11]
Loss	0–4	Jul 2023	Zug, Switzerland	Challenger	Clay	(Czech Republic) Dalibor Svrčina	(France) Théo Arribagé (France) Luca Sanchez	3–6, 5–7
Loss	0–5	Aug 2024	Dobrich, Bulgaria	Challenger	Clay	(Romania) Victor Vlad Cornea	(Peru) Alexander Merino (Germany) Christoph Negritu	4–6, 2–6

== ITF Futures/World Tennis Tour finals ==
=== Singles: 21 (15 titles, 6 runner-ups) ===
Legend ITF Futures/WTT (15–6)	Finals by surface Hard (6–2) Clay (9–4) Grass (0–0) Carpet (0–0)

Result	W–L	Date	Tournament	Tier	Surface	Opponent	Score
Loss	0–1	Aug 2018	Serbia F2, Novi Sad	Futures	Clay	(France) Arthur Rinderknech	2–6, 4–6
Win	1–1	Feb 2019	M15 Antalya, Turkey	WTT	Clay	(Russia) Kirill Kivattsev	4–6, 7–5, 6–2
Loss	1–2	May 2019	M15 Antalya, Turkey	WTT	Clay	(Russia) Ivan Nedelko	3–6, 3–6
Win	2–2	May 2019	M15 Antalya, Turkey	WTT	Clay	(Russia) Denis Klok	6–3, 3–6, 6–4
Loss	2–3	May 2019	M15 Antalya, Turkey	WTT	Clay	(Belgium) Christopher Heyman	4-6, 3-6
Loss	2–4	Dec 2019	M15 Monastir, Tunisia	WTT	Hard	(Tunisia) Skander Mansouri	2-6, 0-6
Win	3–4	Nov 2020	M15 Monastir, Tunisia	WTT	Hard	(Estonia) Kenneth Raisma	1-6, 6-4, 6-1
Win	4–4	Dec 2020	M15 Monastir, Tunisia	WTT	Hard	(France) Titouan Droguet	6-3, 6-1
Win	5–4	Aug 2021	M15 Vejle, Denmark	WTT	Clay	(Denmark) August Holmgren	7-6^{(7–4)}, 6-4
Win	6–4	Aug 2021	M15 Pärnu, Estonia	WTT	Clay	(Estonia) Mattias Siimar	5-7, 6–3, 6-3
Win	7–4	Aug 2021	M25 Überlingen, Germany	WTT	Clay	(Germany) Henri Squire	6-3, 4–6, 6-4
Win	8–4	Jul 2022	M25 Telfs, Austria	WTT	Clay	(United States) Oliver Crawford	6-4, 7–5
Win	9–4	May 2023	M15 Doboj, Bosnia and Herzegovina	WTT	Clay	(Austria) Sebastian Sorger	7-6^{(7–5)}, 7–5
Win	10-4	Jul 2023	M15 Belgrade, Serbia	WTT	Clay	(Serbia) Miljan Zekić	3-6, 7–5, 6–3
Win	11-4	Aug 2023	M25 Tainan, Chinese Taipei	WTT	Clay	(Japan) Makoto Ochi	6–0, 6–2
Win	12–4	Jan 2024	M15 Doha, Qatar	WTT	Hard	(Uzbekistan) Khumoyun Sultanov	3–6, 6–1, 7–5
Win	13–4	Mar 2024	M15 Torelló, Spain	WTT	Hard	(Colombia) Adrià Soriano Barrera	7–6^{(10–8)}, 2–6, 7–5
Win	14–4	Nov 2024	M15 Monastir, Tunisia	WTT	Hard	(Germany) Lasse Pörtner	5–7, 6–4, 6–2
Loss	14–5	Aug 2025	M25 Montesilvano, Italy	WTT	Clay	(Italy) Andrea Picchione	0–6, 5–7
Loss	14–6	Jun 2026	M15 Monastir, Tunisia	WTT	Hard	(Tunisia) Aziz Ouakaa	4–6, 3–6
Win	15–6	Oct 2026	M15 Singapore, Singapore	WTT	Hard	(France) Maxime Janvier	6–3, 7–6^{(7–3)}

=== Doubles: 5 (2 titles, 3 runner-ups) ===
Legend ITF Futures/WTT (2–3)

Result	W–L	Date	Tournament	Tier	Surface	Partner	Opponents	Score
Loss	0–1	Apr 2018	Turkey F17, Antalya	Futures	Clay	(Netherlands) Gijs Brouwer	(Turkey) Cengiz Aksu (Turkey) Mert Naci Türker	6–7^{(5–7)}, 3–6
Loss	0–2	Jul 2018	Austria F2, Kramsach	Futures	Clay	(Czech Republic) Filip Duda	(Germany) Peter Heller (Germany) Johannes Härteis	3–6, 4–6
Loss	0–3	Mar 2022	M25 Poreč, Croatia	WTT	Clay	(France) Titouan Droguet	(Greece) Aristotelis Thanos (Greece) Petros Tsitsipas	6–7^{(4–7)}, 6–4, [7–10]
Win	1–3	May 2023	M15 Doboj, Bosnia and Herzegovina	WTT	Clay	(Netherlands) Ryan Nijboer	(Australia) Matt Hulme (Australia) Zaharije-Zak Talic	7–5, 6–4
Win	2–3	Jan 2024	M15 Doha, Qatar	WTT	Hard	(Turkey) Yankı Erel	(Japan) Naoki Tajima (Japan) Masamichi Imamura	4–6, 6–3, [10–2]
