= Alan Ważny =

Polish tennis player (born 2007)

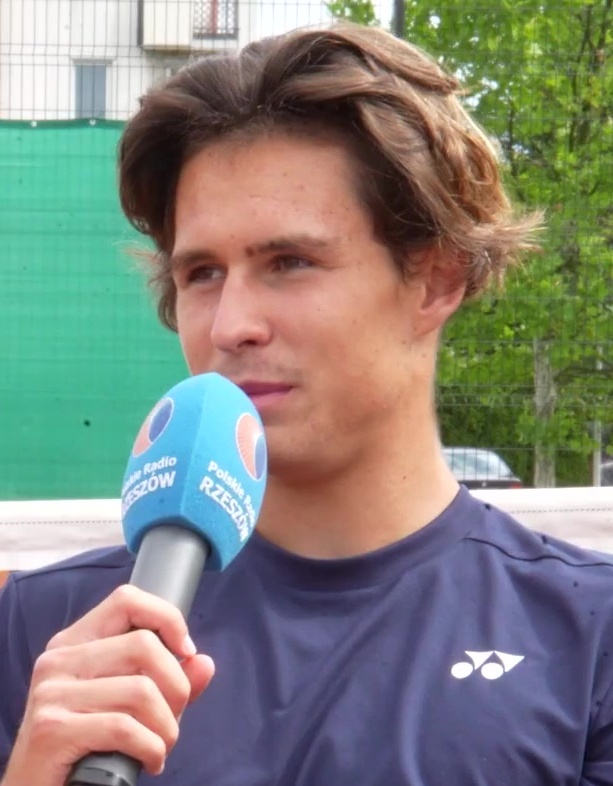
- Ważny in 2025
- Country (sports): Poland
- Born: 4 June 2007 (age 19) Rzeszów, Poland
- Height: 1.83 m (6 ft 0 in)
- Plays: Right-handed (two-handed backhand)
- Coach: Robert Raguz
- Prize money: US $25,293
- Official website: https://alanwazny.com/

Singles
- Career record: 0–0 (at ATP Tour level, Grand Slam level, and in Davis Cup)
- Career titles: 0
- Highest ranking: No. 724 (16 November 2026)
- Current ranking: No. 724 (16 November 2026)

Grand Slam singles results
- Australian Open Junior: 1R (2025)
- French Open Junior: 1R (2025)
- Wimbledon Junior: QF (2025)
- US Open Junior: 2R (2025)

Doubles
- Career record: 0–0 (at ATP Tour level, Grand Slam level, and in Davis Cup)
- Career titles: 0
- Highest ranking: No. 922 (26 October 2026)
- Current ranking: No. 984 (16 November 2026)

Grand Slam doubles results
- Australian Open Junior: 1R (2025)
- French Open Junior: W (2025)
- Wimbledon Junior: W (2025)
- US Open Junior: 1R (2025)
- Last updated on: 16 November 2026.

Alan Ważny (born 4 June 2007) is a Polish tennis player. He has a career-high ATP singles ranking of No. 724 achieved on 16 November 2026 and a doubles ranking of No. 922 achieved on 26 October 2026.

Partnering with Oskari Paldanius, he won two major junior Grand Slam tournaments; 2025 French Open and 2025 Wimbledon Championships.

== Junior career ==
Ważny made his junior Grand Slam debut at the 2025 Australian Open where he was seeded 15th in the boys' singles, but lost to American Benjamin Willwerth in the opening round. He also played the boys' doubles at the championships, partnering Oskari Paldanius of Finland, also losing in the first round.

At the 2025 French Open, he won the boys' doubles title alongside Paldanius, reaching the semi-finals after a straight sets win against Thijs Boogaard and Ivan Ivanov, before beating Keaton Hance and Jack Kennedy of the United States in the semi-finals, and then another American pairing of Noah Johnston and Benjamin Willwerth in the final.

== Professional career ==
Ważny scored his first ATP ranking point in March 2025, reaching the quarterfinals of the ITF M15 tournament in Alaminos, Cyprus. He reached his first pro final in June 2026 in his hometown, Rzeszów. In October, he made another final in Bol, Croatia. In his third attempt, Ważny won his first title in Antalya, Turkey.

== Personal life ==
He is from Rzeszów, where he is a member of Czarni Rzeszów tennis club.

== Junior Grand Slam finals ==
=== Doubles: 2 (2 titles) ===
Result	Year	Tournament	Surface	Partner	Opponents	Score
Winner	2025	French Open	Clay	(Finland) Oskari Paldanius	(United States) Noah Johnston (United States) Benjamin Willwerth	6–2, 6–3
Winner	2025	Wimbledon	Grass	(Finland) Oskari Paldanius	(United Kingdom) Oliver Bonding (United States) Jagger Leach	5–7, 7–6^{(8–6)}, [10–5]

== ITF World Tennis Tour Finals ==
=== Singles: 3 (1 title) ===
Result	Tier	Date	Tournament	Surface	Opponent	Score
Finalist	M15	28.06.2026	(Poland) Rzeszów Open	Clay	(Norway) Herman Hoeyeraal	6:4, 4:6, 2:6
Finalist	M15	18.10.2026	(Croatia) Bluesun Bol Open	Clay	(Serbia) Kristijan Juhas	1:6, 4:6
Winner	M15	15.11.2026	(Turkey) Antalya Series	Clay	(Sweden) Dragos Nicolae Madaras	6:0, 3:0 ret.
