= Nikolás Sánchez Izquierdo =

Spanish tennis player (born 1999)

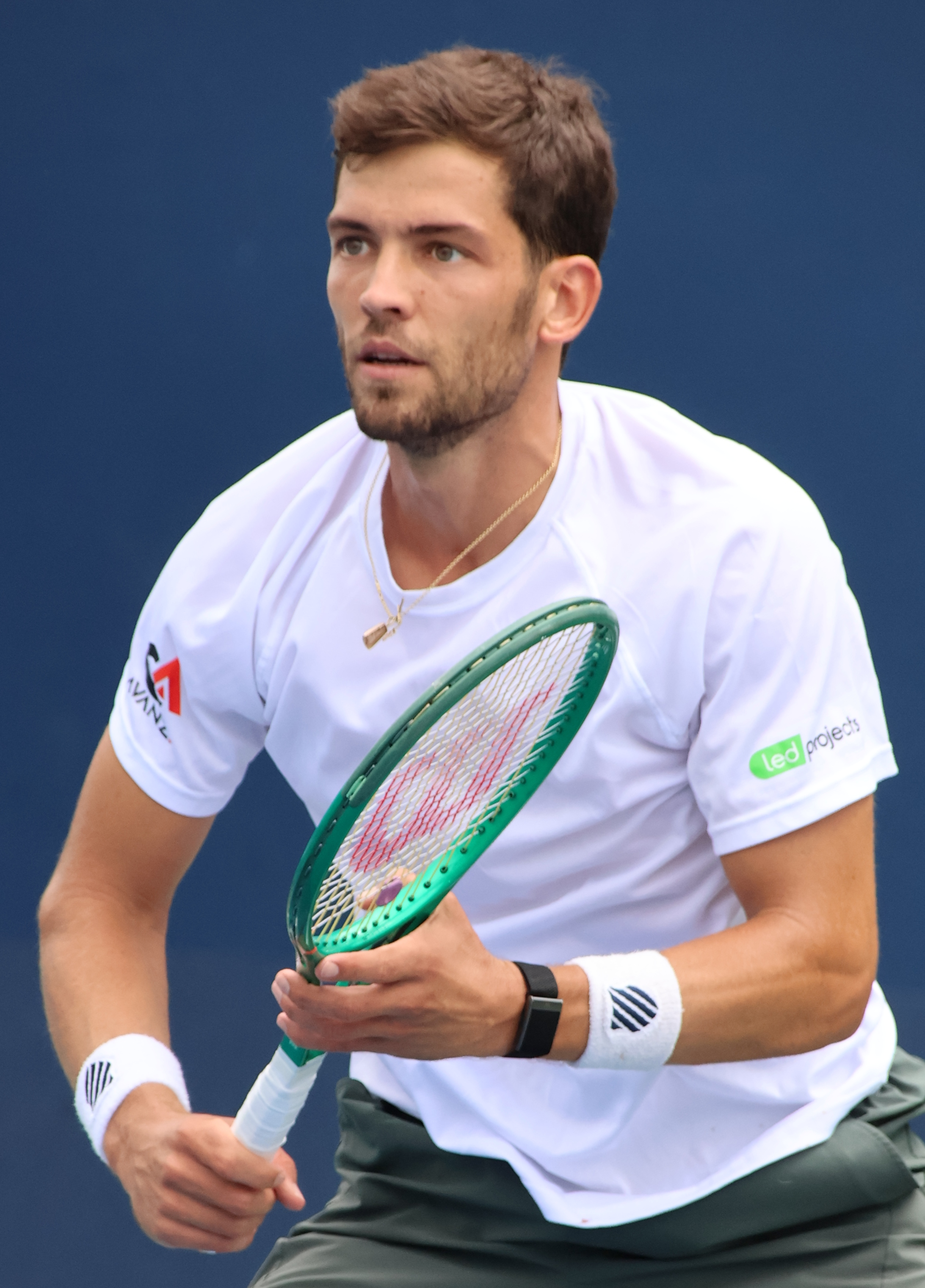
- Sánchez Izquierdo at the 2026 US Open
- Country (sports): Spain
- Residence: Sant Andreu de Llavaneres, Spain
- Born: 15 March 1999 (age 27) Barcelona, Spain
- Height: 1.85 m (6 ft 1 in)
- Plays: Right-handed (two handed-backhand)
- Prize money: US $464,704

Singles
- Career record: 0–1 (at ATP Tour level, Grand Slam level, and in Davis Cup)
- Career titles: 2 Challenger
- Highest ranking: No. 132 (16 November 2026)
- Current ranking: No. 132 (16 November 2026)

Grand Slam singles results
- Wimbledon: Q1 (2026)
- US Open: Q1 (2026)

Doubles
- Career record: 0–0 (at ATP Tour level, Grand Slam level, and in Davis Cup)
- Career titles: 0
- Highest ranking: No. 423 (30 June 2025)
- Current ranking: No. 491 (16 November 2026)
- Last updated on: 16 November 2026.

Nikolás Sánchez Izquierdo (born 17 March 1999) is a Spanish tennis player. He has a career high ATP singles ranking of world No. 132 achieved on 16 November 2026 and a doubles ranking of No. 423 achieved on 30 June 2025.

== Career ==
=== 2024: ATP debut ===
Sánchez Izquierdo made his debut on the ATP Tour as a qualifier at the 2024 ATP Lyon Open, losing to sixth seed Tomás Martín Etcheverry in the first round.

=== 2025: First Challenger final ===
Sánchez Izquierdo reached his first Challenger final at the Brasil Tennis Open, losing to Santiago Rodríguez Taverna in the final.

=== 2026: Maiden Challenger title ===
In April, Sánchez Izquierdo won his maiden Challenger title at the Ostra Open, defeating Zdeněk Kolář in the final. In September, he won his second Challenger title at the Szczecin Open, defeating Thiago Monteiro in the final.

== ATP Challenger Tour finals ==
=== Singles: 4 (3 titles, 1 runner-ups) ===
Legend (singles) ATP Challenger Tour (3–1)	Titles by surface Hard (0–0) Clay (3–1)

Result	W–L	Date	Tournament	Tier	Surface	Opponent	Score
Loss	0–1	Apr 2025	Brasil Tennis Open, Brazil	Challenger	Clay	(Argentina) Santiago Rodríguez Taverna	6–4, 4–6, 6–7^{(6–8)}
Win	1–1	Apr 2026	Ostrava Open, Czech Republic	Challenger	Clay	(Czech Republic) Zdeněk Kolář	6–4, 7–6^{(7–4)}
Win	2–1	Sep 2026	Szczecin Open, Poland	Challenger	Clay	(Brazil) Thiago Monteiro	4–6, 6–3, 7–6^{(8–6)}
Win	3–1	Nov 2026	Lima Challenger, Peru	Challenger	Clay	(Uruguay) Franco Roncadelli	7–6^{(7–4)}, 7–5

== ITF World Tennis Tour finals ==
=== Singles: 20 (12 titles, 8 runner-ups) ===
Legend (singles) Futures/ITF World Tennis Tour (12–8)	Titles by surface Hard (1–1) Clay (11–7)

Result	W–L	Date	Tournament	Tier	Surface	Opponent	Score
Loss	0–1	Oct 2018	Spain F31 Riba-roja de Túria	Futures	Clay	(Belgium) Germain Gigounon	7–6^{(7–4)}, 2–6, 1–6
Loss	0–2	Mar 2019	M15, Tabarka, Tunisia	World Tennis Tour	Clay	(France) Geoffrey Blancaneaux	2–6, 5–7
Win	1–2	Apr 2019	M25, Angers, France	World Tennis Tour	Clay	(Belgium) Jeroen Vanneste	6–3, 7–6^{(7–2)}
Win	2–2	Jun 2019	M15, Tabarka, Tunisia	World Tennis Tour	Clay	(Argentina) Genaro Alberto Olivieri	3–6, 6–4, 6–4
Loss	2–3	Jan 2020	M15, Cairo, Egypt	World Tennis Tour	Hard	(Spain) Javier Martí	2–6, 6–2, 6–7^{(5–7)}
Win	3–3	Jan 2020	M15, Cairo, Egypt	World Tennis Tour	Clay	(France) Matthieu Perchicot	7–6^{(7–4)}, 7–6^{(7–3)}
Win	4–3	Feb 2020	M15 Palma Nova, Spain	World Tennis Tour	Clay	(France) Jules Okala	4–6, 6–2, 6–2
Loss	4–4	Feb 2020	M15 Antalya, Turkey	World Tennis Tour	Clay	(Czech Republic) Jonáš Forejtek	4–6, 3–6
Loss	4–5	Mar 2021	M15 La Nucia, Spain	World Tennis Tour	Clay	(United States) Emilio Nava	6–7^{(8–10)}, 5–7
Win	5–5	Aug 2021	M25 Prostějov, Czech Republic	World Tennis Tour	Clay	(Argentina) Facundo Díaz Acosta	6–4, 1–6, 6–4
Win	6–5	Feb 2022	M15, Villena, Spain	World Tennis Tour	Hard	(Spain) Alejandro Moro Cañas	7–6^{(7–3)}, 6–3
Win	7–5	May 2023	M25, Valldoreix, Spain	World Tennis Tour	Clay	(Spain) Àlex Martí Pujolràs	6–2, 6–0
Win	8–5	May 2023	M25, Mataró, Spain	World Tennis Tour	Clay	(Greece) Stefanos Sakellaridis	6–1, 6–4
Win	9–5	Jul 2023	M25, Esch/Alzette, Luxembourg	World Tennis Tour	Clay	(Germany) Marlon Vankan	1–6, 6–3, 6–2
Win	10–5	Oct 2023	M25, Santa Margherita di Pula, Italy	World Tennis Tour	Clay	(Italy) Gabriele Piraino	6–0, 6–4
Win	11–5	May 2024	M25, Sabadell, Spain	World Tennis Tour	Clay	(Spain) Miguel Damas	6–4, 4–6, 6–3
Win	12–5	Mar 2025	M25, Tarragona, Spain	World Tennis Tour	Clay	(Italy) Raul Brancaccio	6–1, 6–3
Loss	12–6	Apr 2025	M25, Reus, Spain	World Tennis Tour	Clay	(France) Clement Tabur	4–6, 4–6
Loss	12–7	May 2025	M25, Mataró, Spainvv	World Tennis Tour	Clay	(Spain) Bernabé Zapata Miralles	5–7, 4–6
Loss	12–8	Jun 2025	M25, Montauban, France	World Tennis Tour	Clay	(Spain) Miguel Damas	1–6, 6–7^{(7–9)}

=== Doubles: 2 (1–1) ===
Legend (singles) ATP Challenger Tour (0–0) Futures/ITF World Tennis Tour (1–1)	Titles by surface Hard (0–0) Clay (1–1)

Result	W–L	Date	Tournament	Tier	Surface	Partner	Opponent	Score
Loss	0–1	Jun 2019	M15 Tabarka, Tunisia	World Tennis Tour	Clay	(Argentina) Sebastian Baez	(Argentina) Nicolas Bianchi (Argentina) Genaro Alberto Olivieri	4–6, 7–5, 5–10
Win	1–1	Feb 2020	M15 Palma Nova, Spain	World Tennis Tour	Clay	(Spain) Álvaro López San Martín	(France) Maxime Mora (France) Jonathan Eysseric	6–4, 7–6^{(7–4)}
