= Daniel Dutra da Silva =

Brazilian tennis player

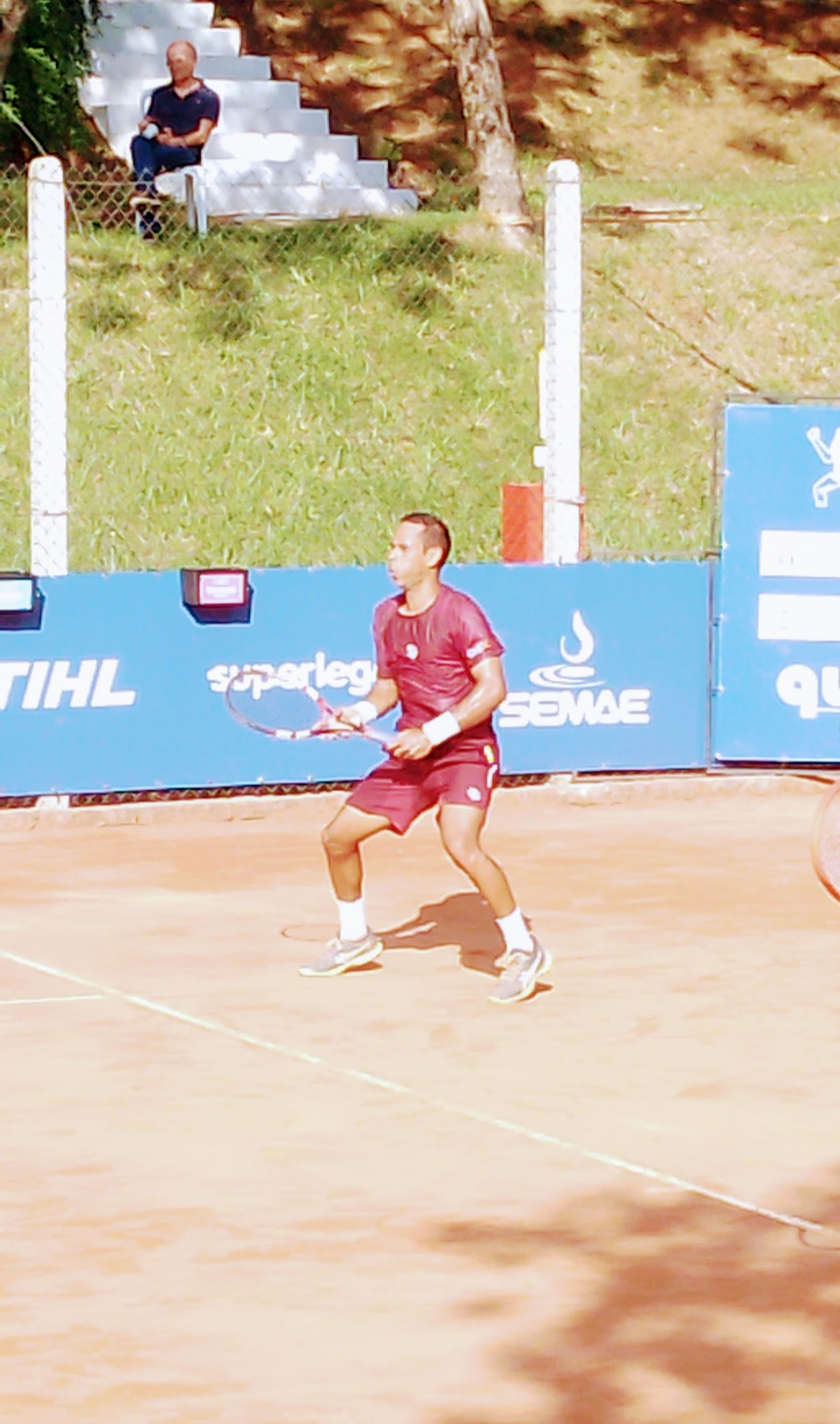
- Dutra da Silva at the 2026 São Léo Open
- Country (sports): Brazil
- Residence: São Paulo, Brazil
- Born: 5 July 1988 (age 37) São Paulo, Brazil
- Height: 1.75 m (5 ft 9 in)
- Turned pro: 2007
- Plays: Left-handed (two-handed backhand)
- Coach: Luiz Peniza; Patricio Arnold; Caio Martins Claudino
- Prize money: US$ 464,534

Singles
- Career record: 0–2
- Career titles: 0
- Highest ranking: No. 207 (15 August 2022)
- Current ranking: No. 382 (20 April 2026)

Grand Slam singles results
- US Open: Q1 (2022)

Doubles
- Career record: 0–0
- Career titles: 0
- Highest ranking: No. 191 (31 July 2023)
- Current ranking: No. 212 (20 April 2026)
- Last updated on: 17 April 2026.

Daniel Dutra da Silva (Brazilian Portuguese: [ˌdɐniˈɛw ˈdutɾɐ dɐ ˈsiwvɐ, dɐˈnjɛw-]; born 5 July 1988) is a Brazilian professional tennis player. He has a career high ATP singles ranking of No. 207, achieved on 15 August 2022 and a doubles ranking of No. 191, achieved on 31 July 2023.

Dutra da Silva competes on the ITF Men's Circuit where he has won 26 singles and 28 doubles Futures titles in his career to date.

== Biography ==
Daniel Dutra da Silva was born in São Paulo, Brazil. He is currently resides in Balneário Camboriú.

He is the brother of Brazilian former tennis player Rogério Dutra Silva.

== Professional career ==
In February 2009 he made his ATP debut at the 2009 Brasil Open in Costa do Sauipe as a qualifier.

In 2022, he reached two Challengers semifinals in Santa Cruz and Vicenza. Ranked No. 215, he qualified for his second ATP singles main draw at the 2022 Generali Open Kitzbühel as a lucky loser where he lost to wildcard Filip Misolic. Subsequently, he reached a new career high singles ranking of No. 207 on 15 August 2022.

=== 2024: First ATP Challenger Tour final at 35 years old ===
At 2024 Brasil Tennis Open, Dutra da Silva became the oldest player to reach a maiden final in Challenger Tour history, at 35 years old. He lost to Ergi Kırkın in the final.

== ATP Challenger Tour finals ==
=== Singles: 1 (runner-up) ===
| Legend ATP Challenger Tour (0–1) |

| Result | W–L | Date | Tournament | Tier | Surface | Opponent | Score |
|---|---|---|---|---|---|---|---|
| Loss | 0–1 | May 2024 | Brasil Tennis Open, Brazil | Challenger | Clay | (Turkey) Ergi Kırkın | 3–6, 5–7 |

=== Doubles: 4 (1 title, 3 runner-ups) ===
| Legend ATP Challenger Tour (1–3) | Finals by surface Hard (0–0) Clay (1–3) |

| Result | W–L | Date | Tournament | Tier | Surface | Partner | Opponents | Score |
|---|---|---|---|---|---|---|---|---|
| Win | 1–0 | Jan 2023 | Challenger de Tigre II, Argentina | Challenger | Clay | (Ukraine) Oleg Prihodko | (United States) Christian Langmo (South Korea) Chung Yun-seong | 6–2, 6–2 |
| Loss | 1–1 | Jul 2023 | Internazionali Città di Verona, Italy | Challenger | Clay | (Dominican Republic) Nick Hardt | (Italy) Federico Gaio (Italy) Andrea Pellegrino | 6–7^{(6–8)}, 2–6 |
| Loss | 1–2 | Jan 2024 | Brasil Tennis Challenger, Brazil | Challenger | Clay | (Brazil) Pedro Sakamoto | (Argentina) Guido Andreozzi (Argentina) Guillermo Durán | 2–6, 6–7^{(5–7)} |
| Loss | 1–3 | Jul 2024 | Internazionali Città di Trieste, Italy | Challenger | Clay | (Zimbabwe) Courtney John Lock | (Italy) Marco Bortolotti (Australia) Matthew Romios | 2–6, 6–7^{(6–8)} |

== ITF Tour finals ==
=== Singles: 28 (26 titles, 2 runner-ups) ===
| Legend ITF Futures/WTT (26–2) | Finals by surface Hard (3–0) Clay (23–2) |

| Result | W–L | Date | Tournament | Tier | Surface | Opponent | Score |
|---|---|---|---|---|---|---|---|
| Win | 1–0 | Aug 2007 | Argentina F13 | Futures | Clay | (Argentina) Alejandro Fabbri | 6–4, 6–2 |
| Win | 2–0 | Sep 2007 | Brazil F15 | Futures | Clay | (Colombia) Alejandro González | 7–6^{(7–1)}, 7–5 |
| Win | 3–0 | Nov 2007 | Brazil F21 | Futures | Clay | (Ukraine) Artem Smirnov | 3–6, 7–5, 6–3 |
| Win | 4–0 | Nov 2007 | Brazil F23 | Futures | Clay | (Brazil) Gabriel Pitta | 6–2, 6–2 |
| Win | 5–0 | May 2008 | Italy F14 | Futures | Clay | (Argentina) Diego Veronelli | 6–3, 6–4 |
| Win | 6–0 | Oct 2008 | Brazil F26 | Futures | Clay | (Brazil) Rodrigo Guidolin | 6–2, 7–6^{(7–1)} |
| Win | 7–0 | Dec 2008 | Brazil F35 | Futures | Clay | (Germany) Lars Poerschke | 7–6^{(7–2)}, 5–7, 6–4 |
| Win | 8–0 | Mar 2009 | Spain F8 | Futures | Clay | (Italy) Francesco Aldi | 7–5, 6–3 |
| Win | 9–0 | May 2010 | Brazil F9 | Futures | Clay | (Brazil) Eladio Ribeiro Neto | 6–3, 1–6, 6–1 |
| Win | 10–0 | Sep 2010 | Brazil F24 | Futures | Clay | (Argentina) Juan-Pablo Villar | 6–3, 1–6, 6–4 |
| Win | 11–0 | Oct 2010 | Brazil F27 | Futures | Hard | (Brazil) Fernando Romboli | 7–6^{(7–3)}, 3–6, 6–4 |
| Win | 12–0 | Oct 2010 | Brazil F30 | Futures | Clay | (Brazil) Rodrigo Guidolin | 7–6^{(7–5)}, 5–7, 6–2 |
| Win | 13–0 | Nov 2010 | Brazil F32 | Futures | Hard | (Portugal) Gastão Elias | 6–7^{(0–7)}, 7–6^{(7–3)}, 7–6^{(7–5)} |
| Win | 14–0 | Jul 2012 | Brazil F18 | Futures | Clay | (Argentina) Maximiliano Estévez | 6–3, 2–6, 6–3 |
| Win | 15–0 | Sep 2012 | Brazil F26 | Futures | Clay | (Brazil) Eduardo Dischinger | 6–7^{(4–7)}, 6–2, 6–2 |
| Win | 16–0 | Nov 2012 | Brazil F33 | Futures | Clay | (Brazil) André Miele | 6–3, 3–6, 6–3 |
| Win | 17–0 | Oct 2013 | Brazil F11 | Futures | Clay | (Brazil) Fabrício Neis | 6–3, 6–4 |
| Win | 18–0 | May 2016 | Argentina F8 | Futures | Clay | (Argentina) Gonzalo Villanueva | 4–6, 6–2, 6–3 |
| Win | 19–0 | Jun 2016 | Argentina F9 | Futures | Clay | (Chile) Juan Carlos Sáez | 1–6, 6–2, 6–3 |
| Win | 20–0 | Jul 2016 | Brazil F1 | Futures | Clay | (Brazil) Bruno Sant'Anna | 7–5, 6–3 |
| Win | 21–0 | Apr 2017 | Portugal F6 | Futures | Clay | (Portugal) João Domingues | 6–2, 3–6, 6–4 |
| Win | 22–0 | Sep 2017 | Argentina F6 | Futures | Clay | (Argentina) Facundo Argüello | 6–3, 7–6^{(7–4)} |
| Win | 23–0 | Nov 2017 | Argentina F8 | Futures | Clay | (Argentina) Agustín Velotti | 6–4, 7–6^{(7–3)} |
| Win | 24–0 | Oct 2021 | M25 Lima, Peru | WTT | Clay | (Spain) Eduard Esteve Lobato | 7–6^{(8–6)}, 6–4 |
| Win | 25–0 | Feb 2023 | M25 Santo Domingo, Dominican Republic | WTT | Hard | (United States) Kyle Seelig | 7–6^{(7–4)}, 7–5 |
| Win | 26–0 | Mar 2024 | M25 Maceió, Brazil | WTT | Clay (i) | (Brazil) Mateus Alves | 4–6, 7–5, 6–3 |
| Loss | 26–1 | Sep 2024 | M25 Luque, Paraguay | WTT | Clay | (Bolivia) Juan Carlos Prado Ángelo | 2–6, 6–2, 6–7^{(6–8)} |
| Loss | 26–2 | Oct 2024 | M25 Lajeado, Brazil | WTT | Clay | (Brazil) Matheus Pucinelli de Almeida | 2–6, 5–7 |
