= 2019 Ludwigshafen Challenger – Singles =

Singles
- 2019 Ludwigshafen Challenger

Final
- Champion: (Germany) Yannick Hanfmann
- Runner-up: (Slovakia) Filip Horanský
- Score: 6–3, 6–1

Events
Singles	Doubles
Ludwigshafen Challenger	· 2020 →

This was the first edition of the tournament.

Yannick Hanfmann won the title after defeating Filip Horanský 6–3, 6–1 in the final.

== Seeds ==
The top eight seeds receive a bye into the second round.

1. (Switzerland) Henri Laaksonen (third round)
2. (Italy) Stefano Travaglia (semifinals)
3. (Portugal) Pedro Sousa (second round)
4. (Sweden) Elias Ymer (quarterfinals)
5. (Slovakia) Andrej Martin (third round)
6. (Italy) Gianluca Mager (third round)
7. (Germany) Dustin Brown (third round)
8. (Germany) Oscar Otte (third round, retired)
9. (Argentina) Facundo Bagnis (quarterfinals)
10. (Argentina) Marco Trungelliti (first round)
11. (Portugal) João Domingues (first round)
12. (Slovakia) Filip Horanský (final)
13. (Argentina) Carlos Berlocq (first round)
14. (Kazakhstan) Aleksandr Nedovyesov (first round)
15. (Colombia) Daniel Elahi Galán (third round)
16. (France) Constant Lestienne (quarterfinals)

== Draw ==
=== Key ===
- Q = Qualifier
- WC = Wild card
- LL = Lucky loser
- Alt = Alternate
- SE = Special exempt
- PR = Protected ranking
- ITF = ITF entry
- JE = Junior exempt
- w/o = Walkover
- r = Retired
- d = Defaulted
- SR = Special ranking

=== Finals ===
Quarterfinals
16	(France) Constant Lestienne	4	6	5
12	(Slovakia) Filip Horanský	6	3	7
Alt	(Slovakia) Alex Molčan	6	6
9	(Argentina) Facundo Bagnis	4	3
(Germany) Yannick Hanfmann	6	6
4	(Sweden) Elias Ymer	4	4
(Spain) Bernabé Zapata Miralles	5	6^{4}
2	(Italy) Stefano Travaglia	7	7^{7}

Semifinals
12	(Slovakia) Filip Horanský	6	6
Alt	(Slovakia) Alex Molčan	4	4
(Germany) Yannick Hanfmann	4	6	6
2	(Italy) Stefano Travaglia	6	3	3

Final
12	(Slovakia) Filip Horanský	3	1
(Germany) Yannick Hanfmann	6	6

=== Top half ===
==== Section 1 ====
First round
(Austria) L Miedler	6	6
(Germany) T Kamke	4	4
ITF	(Switzerland) S Ehrat	4	4
(Netherlands) T de Bakker	6	6
ITF	(Spain) J Barranco Cosano	2	4
16	(France) C Lestienne	6	6
12	(Slovakia) F Horanský	5	6	7
ITF	(Italy) R Bonadio	7	3	5
WC	(Germany) D Altmaier	6	7^{7}
(United Kingdom) J Choinski	4	6^{4}
Q	(Georgia (country)) A Metreveli	7	7^{7}
Q	(Argentina) R Olivo	5	6^{4}

Second round
1	(Switzerland) H Laaksonen	6	7^{7}
(Austria) L Miedler	4	6^{4}
(Netherlands) T de Bakker	3	4
16	(France) C Lestienne	6	6
12	(Slovakia) F Horanský	6	7
WC	(Germany) D Altmaier	2	5
Q	(Georgia (country)) A Metreveli	3	3
8	(Germany) O Otte	6	6

Third round
1	(Switzerland) H Laaksonen	6^{1}	6^{6}
16	(France) C Lestienne	7^{7}	7^{8}
12	(Slovakia) F Horanský	6^{2}	1
8	(Germany) O Otte	7^{7}	0^{r}

Quarterfinals
16	(France) C Lestienne	4	6	5
12	(Slovakia) F Horanský	6	3	7

==== Section 2 ====
First round
(Germany) B Hassan	6	6
(France) S Robert	3	2
Alt	(Slovakia) A Molčan	6	6
WC	(Germany) Vincent Thierry Schneider	3	2
ITF	(Netherlands) T van Rijthoven	6	6^{4}	7
13	(Argentina) C Berlocq	3	7^{7}	5
9	(Argentina) F Bagnis	6	6
(Lithuania) L Grigelis	4	1
WC	(Hungary) Z Piros	6	7^{7}
(Czech Republic) Z Kolář	3	6^{3}
(Italy) G Quinzi	6	6^{5}	3
(Spain) N Kuhn	3	7^{7}	6

Second round
3	(Portugal) P Sousa	2	2
(Germany) B Hassan	6	6
Alt	(Slovakia) A Molčan	6^{4}	6	6
ITF	(Netherlands) T van Rijthoven	7^{7}	2	4
9	(Argentina) F Bagnis	6	4	6
WC	(Hungary) Z Piros	4	6	1
(Spain) N Kuhn	5	6	3
5	(Slovakia) A Martin	7	4	6

Third round
(Germany) B Hassan	3	2
Alt	(Slovakia) A Molčan	6	6
9	(Argentina) F Bagnis	6	6
5	(Slovakia) A Martin	1	3

Quarterfinals
Alt	(Slovakia) A Molčan	6	6
9	(Argentina) F Bagnis	4	3

=== Bottom half ===
==== Section 3 ====
First round
(Netherlands) S Griekspoor	3	3
(Argentina) P Cachin	6	6
WC	(Germany) J Härteis	3	7^{7}	7^{7}
WC	(Germany) J Lenz	6	6^{3}	6^{4}
(Germany) Y Hanfmann	6	3	6
11	(Portugal) J Domingues	3	6	1
15	(Colombia) DE Galán	6	6
ITF	(Belgium) Christopher Heyman	1	2
ITF	(Germany) Peter Heller	6	6
ITF	(France) C Denolly	2	3
(Italy) GM Moroni	6	3	7
(Brazil) G Clezar	3	6	5

Second round
6	(Italy) G Mager	6	5	6
(Argentina) P Cachin	3	7	1
WC	(Germany) J Härteis	3	3
(Germany) Y Hanfmann	6	6
15	(Colombia) DE Galán	6	7^{7}
ITF	(Germany) P Heller	3	6^{5}
(Italy) GM Moroni	4	4
4	(Sweden) E Ymer	6	6

Third round
6	(Italy) G Mager	1	2
(Germany) Y Hanfmann	6	6
15	(Colombia) DE Galán	4	4
4	(Sweden) E Ymer	6	6

Quarterfinals
(Germany) Y Hanfmann	6	6
4	(Sweden) E Ymer	4	4

==== Section 4 ====
First round
(Russia) A Vatutin	7	2	6^{7}
(Germany) S Fanselow	5	6	7^{9}
(France) A Müller	7	2	4
(Spain) B Zapata Miralles	5	6	6
(Germany) D Masur	5	7	6
10	(Argentina) M Trungelliti	7	5	4
14	(Kazakhstan) A Nedovyesov	6	3	6^{5}
(Brazil) R Dutra Silva	4	6	7^{7}
(Spain) D Gimeno Traver	6	6
WC	(Czech Republic) M Gengel	4	4
(France) B Bonzi	7^{7}	3	0^{r}
(Colombia) S Giraldo	6^{5}	6	3

Second round
7	(Germany) D Brown	6	6
(Germany) S Fanselow	3	2
(Spain) B Zapata Miralles	0	6	6
(Germany) D Masur	6	1	0
(Brazil) R Dutra Silva	6	6^{5}	0
(Spain) D Gimeno Traver	3	7^{7}	6
(Colombia) S Giraldo	1	6^{6}
2	(Italy) S Travaglia	6	7^{8}

Third round
7	(Germany) D Brown	3	4
(Spain) B Zapata Miralles	6	6
(Spain) D Gimeno Traver	4	2
2	(Italy) S Travaglia	6	6

Quarterfinals
(Spain) B Zapata Miralles	5	6^{4}
2	(Italy) S Travaglia	7	7^{7}
