= 2025 Rosario Challenger – Doubles =

Doubles
- 2025 Rosario Challenger

Final
- Champions: (Brazil) Marcelo Demoliner (Brazil) Fernando Romboli
- Runners-up: (Argentina) Guido Andreozzi (France) Théo Arribagé
- Score: 7–5, 6–3

Events
Singles	Doubles
- Rosario Challenger

This was the first edition of the tournament.

Marcelo Demoliner and Fernando Romboli won the title after defeating Guido Andreozzi and Théo Arribagé 7–5, 6–3 in the final.

== Seeds ==
1. (Argentina) Guido Andreozzi / (France) Théo Arribagé (final)
2. (Ecuador) Diego Hidalgo / (Brazil) Orlando Luz (quarterfinals)
3. (Brazil) Marcelo Demoliner / (Brazil) Fernando Romboli (champions)
4. (Bolivia) Boris Arias / (Bolivia) Federico Zeballos (semifinals)

== Draw ==
Key

- Q = Qualifier
- WC = Wild card
- LL = Lucky loser
- Alt = Alternate
- ITF = ITF entry
- PR = Protected ranking
- SR = Special ranking
- SE = Special exempt
- JE = Junior exempt
- JR = Junior Accelerator Programme entrant
- CO = College Accelerator Programme entrant
- NG = Next Gen Accelerator Program entrant
- w/o = Walkover
- r = Retired
- d = Defaulted

=== Draw ===
First round
1	(Argentina) G Andreozzi (France) T Arribagé	w/o
(Argentina) F Coria (Bolivia) H Dellien
WC	(Argentina) G Durán (Argentina) R Olivo	6	6
(Brazil) M Alves (Brazil) F Meligeni Alves	2	2
4	(Bolivia) B Arias (Bolivia) F Zeballos	6	7
(Brazil) L Britto (Brazil) M Zormann	2	5
(Argentina) RA Burruchaga (Italy) A Pellegrino
(Bosnia and Herzegovina) D Džumhur (United States) Em Nava	w/o
Alt	(Kazakhstan) D Popko (Spain) N Sánchez Izquierdo	w/o
(Argentina) A Collarini (Argentina) C Ugo Carabelli
WC	(Argentina) V Aboian (Argentina) LE Ambrogi	7^{7}	4	[4]
3	(Brazil) M Demoliner (Brazil) F Romboli	6^{4}	6	[10]
(Argentina) M Kestelboim (Paraguay) AD Vallejo	6	6
Alt	(Argentina) H Casanova (Argentina) S Rodríguez Taverna	2	4
Alt	(Bolivia) M Dellien (Argentina) F Mena
2	(Ecuador) D Hidalgo (Brazil) O Luz	w/o

Quarterfinals
1	(Argentina) G Andreozzi (France) T Arribagé	6	5	[15]
WC	(Argentina) G Durán (Argentina) R Olivo	3	7	[13]
4	(Bolivia) B Arias (Bolivia) F Zeballos	6	6
(Bosnia and Herzegovina) D Džumhur (United States) Em Nava	2	4
Alt	(Kazakhstan) D Popko (Spain) N Sánchez Izquierdo
3	(Brazil) M Demoliner (Brazil) F Romboli	w/o
(Argentina) M Kestelboim (Paraguay) AD Vallejo	6	4	[10]
2	(Ecuador) D Hidalgo (Brazil) O Luz	3	6	[7]

Semifinals
1	(Argentina) G Andreozzi (France) T Arribagé	7	6
4	(Bolivia) B Arias (Bolivia) F Zeballos	5	4
3	(Brazil) M Demoliner (Brazil) F Romboli	6	6
(Argentina) M Kestelboim (Paraguay) AD Vallejo	3	4

Final
1	(Argentina) G Andreozzi (France) T Arribagé	5	3
3	(Brazil) M Demoliner (Brazil) F Romboli	7	6
