= 2025 Challenger Córdoba – Singles =

Singles
- 2025 Challenger Córdoba

Final
- Champion: (Argentina) Thiago Agustín Tirante
- Runner-up: (Argentina) Juan Pablo Ficovich
- Score: 6–4, 6–0

Events
Singles	Doubles
- Challenger Córdoba

This was the first edition of the tournament.

Thiago Agustín Tirante won the title after defeating Juan Pablo Ficovich 6–4, 6–0 in the final.

== Seeds ==
1. (Brazil) Thiago Monteiro (quarterfinals)
2. (Argentina) Juan Manuel Cerúndolo (semifinals, retired)
3. (Colombia) Daniel Elahi Galán (quarterfinals)
4. (Argentina) Thiago Agustín Tirante (champion)
5. (Argentina) Román Andrés Burruchaga (first round)
6. (Argentina) Federico Coria (semifinals)
7. (Argentina) Juan Pablo Ficovich (final)
8. (Peru) Juan Pablo Varillas (quarterfinals)

== Draw ==
Key

- Q = Qualifier
- WC = Wild card
- LL = Lucky loser
- Alt = Alternate
- ITF = ITF entry
- PR = Protected ranking
- SR = Special ranking
- SE = Special exempt
- JE = Junior exempt
- JR = Junior Accelerator Programme entrant
- CO = College Accelerator Programme entrant
- NG = Next Gen Accelerator Program entrant
- w/o = Walkover
- r = Retired
- d = Defaulted

=== Finals ===
Semifinals
7	(Argentina) Juan Pablo Ficovich	7^{7}	6
6	(Argentina) Federico Coria	6^{2}	3
4/WC	(Argentina) Thiago Agustín Tirante	6	4
2	(Argentina) Juan Manuel Cerúndolo	4	3^{r}

Final
7	(Argentina) Juan Pablo Ficovich	4	0
4/WC	(Argentina) Thiago Agustín Tirante	6	6

=== Top half ===
First round
1	(Brazil) T Monteiro	6	7^{7}
Q	(Brazil) Wilson Leite	2	6^{4}
(Peru) G Bueno	6	7
(Spain) P Martín Tiffon	1	5
Alt	(Argentina) L Midón	3	6	6
Q	(Brazil) JL Reis da Silva	6	4	1
(Peru) I Buse	4	1
7	(Argentina) JP Ficovich	6	6
3	(Colombia) DE Galán	6	6
Q	(Argentina) GI Justo	2	2
(Paraguay) AD Vallejo	6	6
(Brazil) D Dutra da Silva	4	1
(Argentina) A Collarini	6	4	4^{r}
Q	(Brazil) P Boscardin Dias	3	6	5
(Brazil) P Sakamoto	7	3	3
6	(Argentina) F Coria	5	6	6

Second round
1	(Brazil) T Monteiro	6	7^{7}
(Peru) G Bueno	4	6^{1}
Alt	(Argentina) L Midón	4	3
7	(Argentina) JP Ficovich	6	6
3	(Colombia) DE Galán	4	7^{7}	7
(Paraguay) AD Vallejo	6	6^{5}	5
Q	(Brazil) P Boscardin Dias	3	3
6	(Argentina) F Coria	6	6

Quarterfinals
1	(Brazil) T Monteiro	3	6	3
7	(Argentina) JP Ficovich	6	3	6
3	(Colombia) DE Galán	1	6	2
6	(Argentina) F Coria	6	0	6

Semifinals
7	(Argentina) JP Ficovich	7^{7}	6
6	(Argentina) F Coria	6^{2}	3

=== Bottom half ===
First round
5	(Argentina) RA Burruchaga	5	3
(United States) Em Nava	7	6
Q	(Argentina) G Villanueva	3	6	6
(Brazil) M Pucinelli de Almeida	6	4	1
WC	(Argentina) M Kestelboim	2	6	0
Alt	(Argentina) R Olivo	6	4	6
(Argentina) JB Torres	4	7	6^{7}
4/WC	(Argentina) TA Tirante	6	5	7^{9}
8	(Peru) JP Varillas	6	7^{7}
(Argentina) GA Olivieri	0	6^{1}
Q	(Argentina) S de la Fuente	6	6
WC	(Argentina) Juan Estévez	4	1
(Bolivia) M Dellien	6	7
Alt	(Argentina) AL Lingua Lavallén	4	5
(Ecuador) Á Guillén Meza	6	5	2
2	(Argentina) JM Cerúndolo	4	7	6

Second round
(United States) Em Nava	6	6^{6}	3
Q	(Argentina) G Villanueva	2	7^{8}	6
Alt	(Argentina) R Olivo	6^{5}	0^{r}
4/WC	(Argentina) TA Tirante	7^{7}	3
8	(Peru) JP Varillas	6	6
Q	(Argentina) S de la Fuente	3	1
(Bolivia) M Dellien	4	3
2	(Argentina) JM Cerúndolo	6	6

Quarterfinals
Q	(Argentina) G Villanueva	4	4
4/WC	(Argentina) TA Tirante	6	6
8	(Peru) JP Varillas	4	2
2	(Argentina) JM Cerúndolo	6	6

Semifinals
4/WC	(Argentina) TA Tirante	6	4
2	(Argentina) JM Cerúndolo	4	3^{r}
