= 2026 Rosario Challenger – Singles =

Singles
- 2026 Rosario Challenger

Final
- Champion: (Argentina) Camilo Ugo Carabelli
- Runner-up: (Argentina) Román Andrés Burruchaga
- Score: 6–2, 6–3

Events
Singles	Doubles
- Rosario Challenger

Camilo Ugo Carabelli was the defending champion and successfully defended his title after defeating Román Andrés Burruchaga 6–2, 6–3 in the final.

== Seeds ==
1. (Argentina) Camilo Ugo Carabelli (champion)
2. (Argentina) Francisco Comesaña (second round)
3. (Argentina) Mariano Navone (withdrew)
4. (Argentina) Juan Manuel Cerúndolo (semifinals)
5. (Argentina) Román Andrés Burruchaga (final)
6. (Chinese Taipei) Tseng Chun-hsin (semifinals)
7. (Bolivia) Hugo Dellien (quarterfinals)
8. (Italy) Andrea Pellegrino (quarterfinals)

== Draw ==
Key

- Q = Qualifier
- WC = Wild card
- LL = Lucky loser
- Alt = Alternate
- ITF = ITF entry
- PR = Protected ranking
- SR = Special ranking
- SE = Special exempt
- JE = Junior exempt
- JR = Junior Accelerator Programme entrant
- CO = College Accelerator Programme entrant
- NG = Next Gen Accelerator Program entrant
- w/o = Walkover
- r = Retired
- d = Defaulted

=== Finals ===
Semifinals
1/WC	(Argentina) Camilo Ugo Carabelli	7	6
4	(Argentina) Juan Manuel Cerúndolo	5	1
6	(Chinese Taipei) Tseng Chun-hsin	3	3
5	(Argentina) Román Andrés Burruchaga	6	6

Final
1/WC	(Argentina) Camilo Ugo Carabelli	6	6
5	(Argentina) Román Andrés Burruchaga	2	3

=== Top half ===
First round
1/WC	(Argentina) C Ugo Carabelli	6	6
Q	(Argentina) GI Justo	1	0
(Argentina) F Díaz Acosta	7^{7}	6
Q	(Brazil) I Marcondes	6^{3}	0
Q	(Argentina) JM La Serna	6	2	6
WC	(Argentina) R Olivo	4	6	3
Alt	(Italy) F Agamenone	2	3
7	(Bolivia) H Dellien	6	6
4	(Argentina) JM Cerúndolo	6	6
Alt	(Argentina) G Villanueva	1	0
(Argentina) A Barrena	3	1
WC	(Argentina) JB Torres	6	6
(Argentina) S Rodríguez Taverna	4	6^{4}
Q	(Argentina) LE Ambrogi	6	7^{7}
Q	(Argentina) Juan Estévez	4	6	4
8	(Italy) A Pellegrino	6	2	6

Second round
1/WC	(Argentina) C Ugo Carabelli	5	6	7^{7}
(Argentina) F Díaz Acosta	7	4	6^{4}
Q	(Argentina) JM La Serna	3	2
7	(Bolivia) H Dellien	6	6
4	(Argentina) JM Cerúndolo	3	6	6
WC	(Argentina) JB Torres	6	4	3
Q	(Argentina) LE Ambrogi	6	4	2
8	(Italy) A Pellegrino	1	6	6

Quarterfinals
1/WC	(Argentina) C Ugo Carabelli	6	6
7	(Bolivia) H Dellien	4	2
4	(Argentina) JM Cerúndolo	6	6
8	(Italy) A Pellegrino	4	3

Semifinals
1/WC	(Argentina) C Ugo Carabelli	7	6
4	(Argentina) JM Cerúndolo	5	1

=== Bottom half ===
First round
6	(Chinese Taipei) C-h Tseng	6	2
Q	(Argentina) H Casanova	1	0^{r}
(Argentina) F Mena	7	7^{7}
(Brazil) T Monteiro	5	6^{3}
(Spain) N Sánchez Izquierdo	3	6	6
(Argentina) A Collarini	6	2	1
(Brazil) T Seyboth Wild	4	6	4
LL	(Argentina) V Aboian	6	2	6
5	(Argentina) RA Burruchaga	6	6
(Argentina) L Midón	1	1
(Brazil) F Meligeni Alves	3	1
(Argentina) GA Olivieri	6	6
(Brazil) P Boscardin Dias	6^{3}	6	7
(Italy) M Cecchinato	7^{7}	3	5
(Argentina) N Kicker	5	3
2	(Argentina) F Comesaña	7	6

Second round
6	(Chinese Taipei) C-h Tseng	6	7
(Argentina) F Mena	3	5
(Spain) N Sánchez Izquierdo	5	4
LL	(Argentina) V Aboian	7	6
5	(Argentina) RA Burruchaga	6	6
(Argentina) GA Olivieri	3	1
(Brazil) P Boscardin Dias	6	3	6
2	(Argentina) F Comesaña	4	6	3

Quarterfinals
6	(Chinese Taipei) C-h Tseng	6	6
LL	(Argentina) V Aboian	2	1
5	(Argentina) RA Burruchaga	7^{7}	6
(Brazil) P Boscardin Dias	6^{3}	3

Semifinals
6	(Chinese Taipei) C-h Tseng	3	3
5	(Argentina) RA Burruchaga	6	6
