= 2026 Challenger Córdoba – Singles =

Singles
- 2026 Challenger Córdoba

Final
- Champion: (Argentina) Juan Manuel La Serna
- Runner-up: (Uruguay) Franco Roncadelli
- Score: 7–5, 2–6, 6–3

Events
Singles	Doubles
- Challenger Córdoba

Thiago Agustín Tirante was the defending champion but chose not to defend his title.

Juan Manuel La Serna won the title after defeating Franco Roncadelli 7–5, 2–6, 6–3 in the final.

== Seeds ==
1. (Argentina) Guido Iván Justo (semifinals)
2. (Argentina) Andrea Collarini (second round)
3. (Uruguay) Franco Roncadelli (final)
4. (Peru) Juan Pablo Varillas (first round, retired)
5. (Bolivia) Murkel Dellien (second round)
6. (Argentina) Juan Bautista Torres (semifinals)
7. (Argentina) Nicolás Kicker (quarterfinals)
8. (Argentina) Juan Manuel La Serna (champion)

== Draw ==
Key

- Q = Qualifier
- WC = Wild card
- LL = Lucky loser
- Alt = Alternate
- ITF = ITF entry
- PR = Protected ranking
- SR = Special ranking
- SE = Special exempt
- JE = Junior exempt
- JR = Junior Accelerator Programme entrant
- CO = College Accelerator Programme entrant
- NG = Next Gen Accelerator Program entrant
- w/o = Walkover
- r = Retired
- d = Defaulted

=== Finals ===
Semifinals
1	(Argentina) Guido Iván Justo	1	4
3	(Uruguay) Franco Roncadelli	6	6
8	(Argentina) Juan Manuel La Serna	6	6
6	(Argentina) Juan Bautista Torres	4	2

Final
3	(Uruguay) Franco Roncadelli	5	6	3
8	(Argentina) Juan Manuel La Serna	7	2	6

=== Top half ===
First round
1	(Argentina) GI Justo	6	0
(Argentina) Lorenzo Joaquín Rodríguez	3	0^{r}
(Argentina) LE Ambrogi	6	6
PR	(Argentina) R Olivo	4	2
WC	(Argentina) Fernando Cavallo	3	6^{1}
(Brazil) E Ribeiro	6	7^{7}
Alt	(Argentina) S de la Fuente	1	3
5	(Bolivia) M Dellien	6	6
3	(Uruguay) F Roncadelli	7^{7}	6
(Brazil) P Sakamoto	6^{5}	4
(Brazil) M Pucinelli de Almeida	6	4
(Argentina) H Casanova	3	2^{r}
WC	(Argentina) Juan Ignacio Gallego	6^{4}	0
Alt	(United States) Ryan Dickerson	7^{7}	6
Q	(Argentina) Ignacio Monzón	2	2
7	(Argentina) N Kicker	6	6

Second round
1	(Argentina) GI Justo	6	6
(Argentina) LE Ambrogi	4	1
(Brazil) E Ribeiro	6	6
5	(Bolivia) M Dellien	4	4
3	(Uruguay) F Roncadelli	6	7^{7}
(Brazil) M Pucinelli de Almeida	0	6^{2}
Alt	(United States) R Dickerson	0	1
7	(Argentina) N Kicker	6	6

Quarterfinals
1	(Argentina) GI Justo	7^{11}	7
(Brazil) E Ribeiro	6^{9}	5
3	(Uruguay) F Roncadelli	2	7^{7}	7
7	(Argentina) N Kicker	6	6^{3}	5

Semifinals
1	(Argentina) GI Justo	1	4
3	(Uruguay) F Roncadelli	6	6

=== Bottom half ===
First round
8	(Argentina) JM La Serna	6	6
WC	(Argentina) Máximo Zeitune	3	4
Q	(Argentina) Thiago Cigarrán	2	6^{4}
(Argentina) G Villanueva	6	7^{7}
(Argentina) V Aboian	6	6
Alt	(Argentina) Carlos María Zárate	4	1
Q	(Peru) A Huertas del Pino	4
4	(Peru) JP Varillas	3^{r}
6	(Argentina) JB Torres	7	6
Alt	(Brazil) Bruno Fernandez	5	4
Q	(Colombia) Samuel Alejandro Linde Palacios	4	6	4
Q	(Argentina) Tomás Farjat	6	2	3^{r}
Q	(Argentina) Segundo Goity Zapico	0	3
Alt	(Colombia) Miguel Tobón	6	6
(Argentina) Juan Estévez	5	4
2	(Argentina) A Collarini	7	6

Second round
8	(Argentina) JM La Serna	6	6
(Argentina) G Villanueva	3	4
(Argentina) V Aboian	6	6
Q	(Peru) A Huertas del Pino	4	3
6	(Argentina) JB Torres	6	6
Q	(Colombia) SA Linde Palacios	0	2
Alt	(Colombia) M Tobón	4	7^{7}	6
2	(Argentina) A Collarini	6	6^{5}	3

Quarterfinals
8	(Argentina) JM La Serna	4	6	6
(Argentina) V Aboian	6	1	0
6	(Argentina) JB Torres	6^{4}	6	6
Alt	(Colombia) M Tobón	7^{7}	4	1

Semifinals
8	(Argentina) JM La Serna	6	6
6	(Argentina) JB Torres	4	2
