= 2025 Rosario Challenger – Singles =

Singles
- 2025 Rosario Challenger

Final
- Champion: (Argentina) Camilo Ugo Carabelli
- Runner-up: (Bolivia) Hugo Dellien
- Score: 3–6, 6–3, 6–2

Events
Singles	Doubles
- Rosario Challenger

This was the first edition of the tournament.

Camilo Ugo Carabelli won the title after defeating Hugo Dellien 3–6, 6–3, 6–2 in the final.

== Seeds ==
1. (Argentina) Sebastián Báez (semifinals)
2. (France) Alexandre Müller (first round)
3. (Argentina) Francisco Comesaña (quarterfinals)
4. (Bosnia and Herzegovina) Damir Džumhur (second round)
5. (Italy) Francesco Passaro (quarterfinals)
6. (Argentina) Camilo Ugo Carabelli (champion)
7. (Argentina) Federico Coria (second round)
8. (India) Sumit Nagal (second round)

== Draw ==
Key

- Q = Qualifier
- WC = Wild card
- LL = Lucky loser
- Alt = Alternate
- ITF = ITF entry
- PR = Protected ranking
- SR = Special ranking
- SE = Special exempt
- JE = Junior exempt
- JR = Junior Accelerator Programme entrant
- CO = College Accelerator Programme entrant
- NG = Next Gen Accelerator Program entrant
- w/o = Walkover
- r = Retired
- d = Defaulted

=== Finals ===
Semifinals
1/WC	(Argentina) Sebastián Báez	3	7^{15}	2
(Bolivia) Hugo Dellien	6	6^{13}	6
6	(Argentina) Camilo Ugo Carabelli	6	3	6
(Bolivia) Murkel Dellien	3	6	3

Final
(Bolivia) Hugo Dellien	6	3	2
6	(Argentina) Camilo Ugo Carabelli	3	6	6

=== Top half ===
First round
1/WC	(Argentina) S Báez	6	6
Q	(United States) Em Nava	3	3
SE	(Argentina) F Mena	2	1^{r}
(Brazil) G Heide	6	3
(Kazakhstan) D Popko	1	4
Alt	(Argentina) A Collarini	6	6
(Colombia) DE Galán	6	3	3
5	(Italy) F Passaro	2	6	6
3	(Argentina) F Comesaña	2	6	6
Q	(Argentina) JB Torres	6	4	3
LL	(Paraguay) AD Vallejo	4	2
Q	(Italy) A Pellegrino	6	6
(Bolivia) H Dellien	4	6	4
(Chinese Taipei) C-h Tseng	6	4	1^{r}
WC	(Argentina) R Olivo	7	1	0
8	(India) S Nagal	5	6	6

Second round
1/WC	(Argentina) S Báez	7^{7}	7^{7}
(Brazil) G Heide	6^{1}	6^{5}
Alt	(Argentina) A Collarini	6^{4}	3
5	(Italy) F Passaro	7^{7}	6
3	(Argentina) F Comesaña	7	7
Q	(Italy) A Pellegrino	5	5
(Bolivia) H Dellien	6	6
8	(India) S Nagal	1	4

Quarterfinals
1/WC	(Argentina) S Báez	6	6
5	(Italy) F Passaro	1	2
3	(Argentina) F Comesaña	6^{7}	6	3
(Bolivia) H Dellien	7^{9}	3	6

Semifinals
1/WC	(Argentina) S Báez	3	7^{15}	2
(Bolivia) H Dellien	6	6^{13}	6

=== Bottom half ===
First round
6	(Argentina) C Ugo Carabelli	4	6	6
WC	(Argentina) D Schwartzman	6	3	4
(Argentina) TA Tirante	6	1	2
Q	(Argentina) GI Justo	3	6	6
(Argentina) JP Ficovich	6	6
(Argentina) RA Burruchaga	3	4
(Argentina) M Trungelliti	4	4
4	(Bosnia and Herzegovina) D Džumhur	6	6
7	(Argentina) F Coria	4	6	6
Q	(Austria) J Schwärzler	6	3	4
(Bolivia) JC Prado Ángelo	4	5
(Argentina) JM Cerúndolo	6	7
(Bolivia) M Dellien	7	3	6
Q	(Brazil) M Alves	5	6	1
(Brazil) F Meligeni Alves	6	6
2	(France) A Müller	4	4

Second round
6	(Argentina) C Ugo Carabelli	7	2	7
Q	(Argentina) GI Justo	5	6	5
(Argentina) JP Ficovich	6	7^{7}
4	(Bosnia and Herzegovina) D Džumhur	2	6^{4}
7	(Argentina) F Coria	5	6	3
(Argentina) JM Cerúndolo	7	2	6
(Bolivia) M Dellien	4	7^{7}	6
(Brazil) F Meligeni Alves	6	6^{2}	3

Quarterfinals
6	(Argentina) C Ugo Carabelli	3	6	6
(Argentina) JP Ficovich	6	1	0
(Argentina) JM Cerúndolo	6^{6}	6	5
(Bolivia) M Dellien	7^{8}	4	7

Semifinals
6	(Argentina) C Ugo Carabelli	6	3	6
(Bolivia) M Dellien	3	6	3
