= 2026 Rosario Challenger =

- Date: 2 – 8 February
- Edition: 2nd
- Surface: Clay
- Location: Rosario, Argentina

Champions

Singles
- (Argentina) Camilo Ugo Carabelli

Doubles
- (Uruguay) Ignacio Carou / (Argentina) Facundo Mena
- Rosario Challenger

The 2026 Rosario Challenger was a professional tennis tournament played on clay courts. It was the second edition of the tournament, which was part of the 2026 ATP Challenger Tour. It took place in Rosario, Argentina, between 2 and 8 February 2026.

== Singles main-draw entrants ==
=== Seeds ===
Country	Player	Rank^{1}	Seed
ARG	Camilo Ugo Carabelli	49	1
ARG	Francisco Comesaña	68	2
~~ARG~~	~~Mariano Navone~~	~~74~~	~~3~~
ARG	Juan Manuel Cerúndolo	87	4
ARG	Román Andrés Burruchaga	104	5
TPE	Tseng Chun-hsin	122	6
BOL	Hugo Dellien	137	7
ITA	Andrea Pellegrino	138	8

- ^{1} Rankings are as of 19 January 2026.

=== Other entrants ===
The following players received wildcards into the singles main draw:

- (Argentina) Renzo Olivo
- (Argentina) Juan Bautista Torres
- (Argentina) Camilo Ugo Carabelli

The following players received entry into the singles main draw as alternates:

- (Italy) Franco Agamenone
- (Argentina) Gonzalo Villanueva

The following players received entry from the qualifying draw:

- (Argentina) Luciano Emanuel Ambrogi
- (Argentina) Hernán Casanova
- (Argentina) Juan Estévez
- (Argentina) Guido Iván Justo
- (Argentina) Juan Manuel La Serna
- (Brazil) Igor Marcondes

The following player received entry as a lucky loser:

- (Argentina) Valerio Aboian

== Champions ==
=== Singles ===
- (Argentina) Camilo Ugo Carabelli def. (Argentina) Román Andrés Burruchaga 6–2, 6–3.

=== Doubles ===
- (Uruguay) Ignacio Carou / (Argentina) Facundo Mena def. (Mexico) Miguel Ángel Reyes-Varela / (Brazil) Fernando Romboli 6–1, 6–4.
