= 2025 Challenger Córdoba =

- Date: 3 – 9 March
- Edition: 1st
- Surface: Clay
- Location: Córdoba, Argentina

Champions

Singles
- (Argentina) Thiago Agustín Tirante

Doubles
- (Poland) Karol Drzewiecki / (Poland) Piotr Matuszewski
- Challenger Córdoba

The 2025 Challenger Córdoba, known as AAT Challenger Santander edición Córdoba, was a professional tennis tournament played on clay courts. It was the first edition of the tournament which was part of the 2025 ATP Challenger Tour. It took place in Córdoba, Argentina between 3 and 9 March 2025.

== Singles main-draw entrants ==
=== Seeds ===
Country	Player	Rank^{1}	Seed
BRA	Thiago Monteiro	108	1
ARG	Juan Manuel Cerúndolo	123	2
COL	Daniel Elahi Galán	125	3
ARG	Thiago Agustín Tirante	128	4
ARG	Román Andrés Burruchaga	134	5
ARG	Federico Coria	136	6
ARG	Juan Pablo Ficovich	175	7
PER	Juan Pablo Varillas	187	8

- ^{1} Rankings are as of 24 February 2025.

=== Other entrants ===
The following players received wildcards into the singles main draw:

- (Argentina) Juan Estévez
- (Argentina) Mariano Kestelboim
- (Argentina) Thiago Agustín Tirante

The following players received entry into the singles main draw as alternates:

- (Argentina) Alejo Lorenzo Lingua Lavallén
- (Argentina) Lautaro Midón
- (Argentina) Renzo Olivo

The following players received entry from the qualifying draw:

- (Brazil) Pedro Boscardin Dias
- (Argentina) Santiago de la Fuente
- (Argentina) Guido Iván Justo
- (Brazil) Wilson Leite
- (Brazil) João Lucas Reis da Silva
- (Argentina) Gonzalo Villanueva

== Champions ==
=== Singles ===
- (Argentina) Thiago Agustín Tirante def. (Argentina) Juan Pablo Ficovich 6–4, 6–0.

=== Doubles ===
- (Poland) Karol Drzewiecki / (Poland) Piotr Matuszewski def. (Brazil) Fernando Romboli / (Chile) Matías Soto 6–4, 6–4.
