= 2025 Rosario Challenger =

- Date: 3 – 9 February
- Edition: 1st
- Surface: Clay
- Location: Rosario, Argentina

Champions

Singles
- (Argentina) Camilo Ugo Carabelli

Doubles
- (Brazil) Marcelo Demoliner / (Brazil) Fernando Romboli
- Rosario Challenger

The 2025 Rosario Challenger, known as the YPF Rosario Challenger, was a professional tennis tournament played on clay courts. It was the first edition of the tournament, which was part of the 2025 ATP Challenger Tour. It took place in Rosario, Argentina, between 3 and 9 February 2025.

== Singles main-draw entrants ==
=== Seeds ===
Country	Player	Rank^{1}	Seed
ARG	Sebastián Báez	31	1
FRA	Alexandre Müller	57	2
ARG	Francisco Comesaña	86	3
BIH	Damir Džumhur	88	4
ITA	Francesco Passaro	90	5
ARG	Camilo Ugo Carabelli	93	6
ARG	Federico Coria	95	7
IND	Sumit Nagal	106	8

- ^{1} Rankings are as of 27 January 2025.

=== Other entrants ===
The following players received wildcards into the singles main draw:

- (Argentina) Sebastián Báez
- (Argentina) Renzo Olivo
- (Argentina) Diego Schwartzman

The following player received entry into the singles main draw as a special exempt:

- (Argentina) Facundo Mena

The following player received entry into the singles main draw as an alternate:

- (Argentina) Andrea Collarini

The following players received entry from the qualifying draw:

- (Brazil) Mateus Alves
- (Argentina) Guido Iván Justo
- (United States) Emilio Nava
- (Italy) Andrea Pellegrino
- (Austria) Joel Schwärzler
- (Argentina) Juan Bautista Torres

The following player received entry as a lucky loser:

- (Paraguay) Daniel Vallejo

== Champions ==
=== Singles ===
- (Argentina) Camilo Ugo Carabelli def. (Bolivia) Hugo Dellien 3–6, 6–3, 6–2.

=== Doubles ===
- (Brazil) Marcelo Demoliner / (Brazil) Fernando Romboli def. (Argentina) Guido Andreozzi / (France) Théo Arribagé 7–5, 6–3.
