= 2019 Ludwigshafen Challenger – Doubles =

Doubles
- 2019 Ludwigshafen Challenger

Final
- Champions: (United States) Nathaniel Lammons (Brazil) Fernando Romboli
- Runners-up: (Portugal) João Domingues (Portugal) Pedro Sousa
- Score: 7–6^{(7–4)}, 6–1

Events
Singles	Doubles
Ludwigshafen Challenger	· 2020 →

This was the first edition of the tournament.

Nathaniel Lammons and Fernando Romboli won the title after defeating João Domingues and Pedro Sousa 7–6^{(7–4)}, 6–1 in the final.

== Seeds ==
1. (United States) Nathaniel Lammons / (Brazil) Fernando Romboli (champions)
2. (Australia) Rameez Junaid / (Netherlands) David Pel (first round)
3. (Germany) Dustin Brown / (Mexico) Hans Hach Verdugo (semifinals)
4. (Brazil) Rogério Dutra Silva / (Brazil) Fabrício Neis (first round)

== Draw ==
=== Key ===
- Q = Qualifier
- WC = Wild card
- LL = Lucky loser
- Alt = Alternate
- SE = Special exempt
- PR = Protected ranking
- ITF = ITF entry
- JE = Junior exempt
- w/o = Walkover
- r = Retired
- d = Defaulted
- SR = Special ranking

First round
1	(United States) N Lammons (Brazil) F Romboli	6	6^{3}	[10]
WC	(Germany) J Härteis (Germany) B Hassan	2	7^{7}	[3]
(Lithuania) L Grigelis (Czech Republic) Z Kolář	6	6
ITF	(Spain) J Barranco Cosano (France) C Denolly	1	0
4	(Brazil) R Dutra Silva (Brazil) F Neis	2	6^{7}
(United States) H Reese (Canada) A Shamasdin	6	7^{9}
(Slovakia) F Horanský (Austria) L Miedler	7	7
(Poland) K Drzewiecki (Poland) S Walków	5	5
(Sweden) A Siljeström (Sweden) E Ymer	w/o
(Germany) A Begemann (Germany) T Kamke
WC	(Czech Republic) M Gengel (Germany) Vincent Thierry Schneider	4	6^{1}
3	(Germany) D Brown (Mexico) H Hach Verdugo	6	7^{7}
WC	(Germany) D Altmaier (Germany) D Masur	4	4
(Portugal) J Domingues (Portugal) P Sousa	6	6
ITF	(Germany) Peter Heller (Australia) S Puodziunas	6	6
2	(Australia) R Junaid (Netherlands) D Pel	3	4

Quarterfinals
1	(United States) N Lammons (Brazil) F Romboli	6	6
(Lithuania) L Grigelis (Czech Republic) Z Kolář	4	4
(United States) H Reese (Canada) A Shamasdin	5	4
(Slovakia) F Horanský (Austria) L Miedler	7	6
(Sweden) A Siljeström (Sweden) E Ymer	7^{8}	4	[9]
3	(Germany) D Brown (Mexico) H Hach Verdugo	6^{6}	6	[11]
(Portugal) J Domingues (Portugal) P Sousa	6	6
ITF	(Germany) P Heller (Australia) S Puodziunas	4	3

Semifinals
1	(United States) N Lammons (Brazil) F Romboli	7	6
(Slovakia) F Horanský (Austria) L Miedler	5	1
3	(Germany) D Brown (Mexico) H Hach Verdugo	4	6	[11]
(Portugal) J Domingues (Portugal) P Sousa	6	3	[13]

Final
1	(United States) N Lammons (Brazil) F Romboli	7^{7}	6
(Portugal) J Domingues (Portugal) P Sousa	6^{4}	1
