= 2019 Ludwigshafen Challenger =

- Date: 1 July – 7 July
- Edition: 1st
- Draw: 56S / 16D
- Surface: Clay
- Location: Ludwigshafen, Germany

Champions

Singles
- (Germany) Yannick Hanfmann

Doubles
- (United States) Nathaniel Lammons / (Brazil) Fernando Romboli
Ludwigshafen Challenger	· 2020 →

The 2019 Ludwigshafen Challenger is a professional tennis tournament played on clay courts. It is the 1st edition of the tournament which is part of the 2019 ATP Challenger Tour. It takes place in Ludwigshafen, Germany between 1 and 7 July 2019.

== Singles main-draw entrants ==
=== Seeds ===
Country	Player	Rank^{1}	Seed
SUI	Henri Laaksonen	95	1
ITA	Stefano Travaglia	100	2
POR	Pedro Sousa	106	3
SWE	Elias Ymer	120	4
SVK	Andrej Martin	122	5
ITA	Gianluca Mager	131	6
GER	Dustin Brown	150	7
GER	Oscar Otte	153	8
ARG	Facundo Bagnis	164	9
ARG	Marco Trungelliti	165	10
POR	João Domingues	168	11
SVK	Filip Horanský	178	12
ARG	Carlos Berlocq	186	13
KAZ	Aleksandr Nedovyesov	194	14
COL	Daniel Elahi Galán	198	15
FRA	Constant Lestienne	202	16

- ^{1} Rankings are as of 24 June 2019.

=== Other entrants ===
The following players received wildcards into the singles main draw:

- (Germany) Daniel Altmaier
- (Czech Republic) Marek Gengel
- (Germany) Johannes Härteis
- (Germany) Julian Lenz
- (Hungary) Zsombor Piros
- (Germany) Vincent Thierry Schneider

The following player received entry into the singles main draw as an alternate:

- (Slovakia) Alex Molčan

The following players received entry into the singles main draw using their ITF World Tennis Ranking:

- (Spain) Javier Barranco Cosano
- (Italy) Riccardo Bonadio
- (France) Corentin Denolly
- (Switzerland) Sandro Ehrat
- (Germany) Peter Heller
- (Belgium) Christopher Heyman
- (Netherlands) Tim van Rijthoven

The following players received entry from the qualifying draw:

- (Georgia (country)) Aleksandre Metreveli
- (Argentina) Renzo Olivo

== Champions ==
=== Singles ===
- (Germany) Yannick Hanfmann def. (Slovakia) Filip Horanský 6–3, 6–1.

=== Doubles ===
- (United States) Nathaniel Lammons / (Brazil) Fernando Romboli def. (Portugal) João Domingues / (Portugal) Pedro Sousa 7–6^{(7–4)}, 6–1.
