= 2026 Rosario Challenger – Doubles =

Doubles
- 2026 Rosario Challenger

Final
- Champions: (Uruguay) Ignacio Carou (Argentina) Facundo Mena
- Runners-up: (Mexico) Miguel Ángel Reyes-Varela (Brazil) Fernando Romboli
- Score: 6–1, 6–4

Events
Singles	Doubles
- Rosario Challenger

Marcelo Demoliner and Fernando Romboli were the defending champions but only Romboli chose to defend his title, partnering Miguel Ángel Reyes-Varela. They lost in the final to Ignacio Carou and Facundo Mena.

Carou and Mena won the title after defeating Reyes-Varela and Romboli 6–1, 6–4 in the final.

== Seeds ==
1. (Mexico) Miguel Ángel Reyes-Varela / (Brazil) Fernando Romboli (final)
2. (Argentina) Mariano Kestelboim / (Brazil) Marcelo Zormann (withdrew)
3. (Brazil) Paulo André Saraiva dos Santos / (Argentina) Gonzalo Villanueva (first round)
4. (Uruguay) Ignacio Carou / (Argentina) Facundo Mena (champions)

== Draw ==
Key

- Q = Qualifier
- WC = Wild card
- LL = Lucky loser
- Alt = Alternate
- ITF = ITF entry
- PR = Protected ranking
- SR = Special ranking
- SE = Special exempt
- JE = Junior exempt
- JR = Junior Accelerator Programme entrant
- CO = College Accelerator Programme entrant
- NG = Next Gen Accelerator Program entrant
- w/o = Walkover
- r = Retired
- d = Defaulted

First round
1	(Mexico) M Reyes-Varela (Brazil) F Romboli	6	7
WC	(Argentina) LE Ambrogi (Argentina) Mateo del Pino	2	5
(Italy) F Agamenone (Argentina) S Rodríguez Taverna	7	6
(Brazil) Bruno Fernandez (Argentina) Carlos María Zárate	5	3
3	(Brazil) PA Saraiva dos Santos (Argentina) G Villanueva	4	6	[8]
WC	(Argentina) A Collarini (Argentina) R Olivo	6	2	[10]
(Argentina) S de la Fuente (Argentina) JB Torres
(Brazil) P Boscardin Dias (Argentina) GI Justo	w/o
(Peru) C Huertas del Pino (Brazil) Bruno Oliveira	3	6	[6]
4	(Uruguay) I Carou (Argentina) F Mena	6	2	[10]
(Italy) M Cecchinato (Italy) A Pellegrino	3^{r}
(Argentina) V Aboian (Argentina) Tomás Farjat	2
(Argentina) GA Olivieri (Spain) N Sánchez Izquierdo
Alt	(Argentina) Juan Estévez (Argentina) Lucio Ratti	w/o

Quarterfinals
1	(Mexico) M Reyes-Varela (Brazil) F Romboli	w/o
(Italy) F Agamenone (Argentina) S Rodríguez Taverna
WC	(Argentina) A Collarini (Argentina) R Olivo
(Brazil) I Marcondes (Brazil) E Ribeiro	w/o
(Brazil) P Boscardin Dias (Argentina) GI Justo
4	(Uruguay) I Carou (Argentina) F Mena	w/o
(Argentina) V Aboian (Argentina) T Farjat	2	6	[6]
Alt	(Argentina) J Estévez (Argentina) L Ratti	6	4	[10]

Semifinals
1	(Mexico) M Reyes-Varela (Brazil) F Romboli	6^{3}	6	[10]
(Brazil) I Marcondes (Brazil) E Ribeiro	7^{7}	3	[6]
4	(Uruguay) I Carou (Argentina) F Mena	6	6
Alt	(Argentina) J Estévez (Argentina) L Ratti	2	4

Final
1	(Mexico) M Reyes-Varela (Brazil) F Romboli	1	4
4	(Uruguay) I Carou (Argentina) F Mena	6	6
