= 2026 Challenger Córdoba – Doubles =

Doubles
- 2026 Challenger Córdoba

Final
- Champions: (Peru) Arklon Huertas del Pino (Peru) Conner Huertas del Pino
- Runners-up: (Argentina) Ignacio Monzón (Chile) Nicolás Villalón
- Score: 6–3, 6–4

Events
Singles	Doubles
- Challenger Córdoba

Karol Drzewiecki and Piotr Matuszewski were the defending champions but chose not to defend their title.

Arklon and Conner Huertas del Pino won the title after defeating Ignacio Monzón and Nicolás Villalón 6–3, 6–4 in the final.

== Seeds ==
1. (Peru) Alexander Merino / (Bolivia) Federico Zeballos (first round)
2. (Brazil) Bruno Oliveira / (Argentina) Gonzalo Villanueva (first round)
3. (Argentina) Andrea Collarini / (Argentina) Nicolás Kicker (first round)
4. (Argentina) Valentín Basel / (Argentina) Santiago de la Fuente (quarterfinals)

== Draw ==
Key

- Q = Qualifier
- WC = Wild card
- LL = Lucky loser
- Alt = Alternate
- ITF = ITF entry
- PR = Protected ranking
- SR = Special ranking
- SE = Special exempt
- JE = Junior exempt
- JR = Junior Accelerator Programme entrant
- CO = College Accelerator Programme entrant
- NG = Next Gen Accelerator Program entrant
- w/o = Walkover
- r = Retired
- d = Defaulted

First round
1	(Peru) A Merino (Bolivia) F Zeballos	6	5	[9]
WC	(Argentina) Juan Ignacio Gallego (Argentina) Agustín Libre	2	7	[11]
3	(Argentina) A Collarini (Argentina) N Kicker	3	6	[7]
WC	(Argentina) Segundo Goity Zapico (Argentina) Tadeo Meneo	6	3	[10]
(Peru) A Huertas del Pino (Peru) C Huertas del Pino	w/o
(Argentina) Thiago Cigarrán (Argentina) Lorenzo Joaquín Rodríguez
(Brazil) M Pucinelli de Almeida (Brazil) Nicolas Zanellato	4	4
(Argentina) Ignacio Monzón (Chile) Nicolás Villalón	6	6
(Argentina) H Casanova (Brazil) E Ribeiro
4	(Argentina) Valentín Basel (Argentina) S de la Fuente	w/o
Alt	(Brazil) Bruno Fernandez (Argentina) Valentín Garay	6	6^{3}	[9]
(Argentina) JM La Serna (Colombia) Miguel Tobón	3	7^{7}	[11]
(Argentina) LE Ambrogi (Argentina) Máximo Zeitune	7^{8}	6
2	(Brazil) Bruno Oliveira (Argentina) G Villanueva	6^{6}	2

Quarterfinals
WC	(Argentina) JI Gallego (Argentina) A Libre	7^{7}	6
(Argentina) Juan Estévez (Argentina) Tomás Farjat	6^{5}	4
WC	(Argentina) S Goity Zapico (Argentina) T Meneo	1	4
(Peru) A Huertas del Pino (Peru) C Huertas del Pino	6	6
(Argentina) I Monzón (Chile) N Villalón	0	7	[11]
4	(Argentina) V Basel (Argentina) S de la Fuente	6	5	[9]
(Argentina) JM La Serna (Colombia) M Tobón	6	4	[15]
(Argentina) LE Ambrogi (Argentina) M Zeitune	3	6	[17]

Semifinals
WC	(Argentina) JI Gallego (Argentina) A Libre	2	2
(Peru) A Huertas del Pino (Peru) C Huertas del Pino	6	6
(Argentina) I Monzón (Chile) N Villalón	4	7	[10]
(Argentina) LE Ambrogi (Argentina) M Zeitune	6	5	[7]

Final
(Peru) A Huertas del Pino (Peru) C Huertas del Pino	6	6
(Argentina) I Monzón (Chile) N Villalón	3	4
