= 2025 Challenger Córdoba – Doubles =

Doubles
- 2025 Challenger Córdoba

Final
- Champions: (Poland) Karol Drzewiecki (Poland) Piotr Matuszewski
- Runners-up: (Brazil) Fernando Romboli (Chile) Matías Soto
- Score: 6–4, 6–4

Events
Singles	Doubles
- Challenger Córdoba

This was the first edition of the tournament.

Karol Drzewiecki and Piotr Matuszewski won the title after defeating Fernando Romboli and Matías Soto 6–4, 6–4 in the final.

== Seeds ==
1. (Germany) Jakob Schnaitter / (Germany) Mark Wallner (quarterfinals)
2. (Brazil) Marcelo Demoliner / (Ecuador) Gonzalo Escobar (semifinals)
3. (Poland) Karol Drzewiecki / (Poland) Piotr Matuszewski (champions)
4. (Brazil) Fernando Romboli / (Chile) Matías Soto (final)

== Draw ==
Key

- Q = Qualifier
- WC = Wild card
- LL = Lucky loser
- Alt = Alternate
- ITF = ITF entry
- PR = Protected ranking
- SR = Special ranking
- SE = Special exempt
- JE = Junior exempt
- JR = Junior Accelerator Programme entrant
- CO = College Accelerator Programme entrant
- NG = Next Gen Accelerator Program entrant
- w/o = Walkover
- r = Retired
- d = Defaulted

=== Draw ===
First round
1	(Germany) J Schnaitter (Germany) M Wallner	6	7^{7}
(Bolivia) B Arias (Bolivia) F Zeballos	3	6^{4}
(Brazil) L Britto (Brazil) D Dutra da Silva	3	3
(Uruguay) I Carou (Argentina) JM Cerúndolo	6	6
3	(Poland) K Drzewiecki (Poland) P Matuszewski	6	6
WC	(Argentina) Valentín Basel (Argentina) F Ribero	3	4
WC	(Argentina) Sean Hess (Argentina) AL Lingua Lavallén	4	7^{10}	[7]
PR	(Peru) A Huertas del Pino (Peru) C Huertas del Pino	6	6^{8}	[10]
(Argentina) A Collarini (Argentina) R Olivo	3	6	[10]
(Argentina) G Durán (Argentina) M Kestelboim	6	3	[6]
Alt	(Peru) G Bueno (Peru) I Buse	6	6^{2}	[8]
4	(Brazil) F Romboli (Chile) M Soto	4	7^{7}	[10]
(Ecuador) Á Guillén Meza (Kazakhstan) D Popko	6^{6}	4
(Argentina) Leonardo Aboian (Argentina) V Aboian	7^{8}	6
(Colombia) C Rodríguez (Brazil) M Zormann	4	4
2	(Brazil) M Demoliner (Ecuador) G Escobar	6	6

Quarterfinals
1	(Germany) J Schnaitter (Germany) M Wallner	5	4
(Uruguay) I Carou (Argentina) JM Cerúndolo	7	6
3	(Poland) K Drzewiecki (Poland) P Matuszewski	7^{7}	6
PR	(Peru) A Huertas del Pino (Peru) C Huertas del Pino	6^{1}	3
(Argentina) A Collarini (Argentina) R Olivo	5	2
4	(Brazil) F Romboli (Chile) M Soto	7	6
(Argentina) L Aboian (Argentina) V Aboian	4	6^{10}
2	(Brazil) M Demoliner (Ecuador) G Escobar	6	7^{12}

Semifinals
(Uruguay) I Carou (Argentina) JM Cerúndolo	3	4
3	(Poland) K Drzewiecki (Poland) P Matuszewski	6	6
4	(Brazil) F Romboli (Chile) M Soto	6^{5}	7^{7}	[10]
2	(Brazil) M Demoliner (Ecuador) G Escobar	7^{7}	6^{5}	[3]

Final
3	(Poland) K Drzewiecki (Poland) P Matuszewski	6	6
4	(Brazil) F Romboli (Chile) M Soto	4	4
