= 2026 Challenger Córdoba =

- Date: 11 – 16 May
- Edition: 2nd
- Surface: Clay
- Location: Córdoba, Argentina

Champions

Singles
- (Argentina) Juan Manuel La Serna

Doubles
- (Peru) Arklon Huertas del Pino / (Peru) Conner Huertas del Pino
- Challenger Córdoba

The 2026 Challenger Córdoba was a professional tennis tournament played on clay courts. It was the second edition of the tournament which was part of the 2026 ATP Challenger Tour. It took place in Córdoba, Argentina between 11 and 16 May 2026.

== Singles main-draw entrants ==
=== Seeds ===
Country	Player	Rank^{1}	Seed
ARG	Guido Iván Justo	263	1
ARG	Andrea Collarini	268	2
URU	Franco Roncadelli	274	3
PER	Juan Pablo Varillas	300	4
BOL	Murkel Dellien	317	5
ARG	Juan Bautista Torres	325	6
ARG	Nicolás Kicker	348	7
ARG	Juan Manuel La Serna	367	8

- ^{1} Rankings are as of 4 May 2026.

=== Other entrants ===
The following players received wildcards into the singles main draw:

- (Argentina) Fernando Cavallo
- (Argentina) Juan Ignacio Gallego
- (Argentina) Máximo Zeitune

The following player received entry into the singles main draw using a protected ranking:

- (Argentina) Renzo Olivo

The following players received entry into the singles main draw as alternates:

- (Argentina) Santiago de la Fuente
- (United States) Ryan Dickerson
- (Brazil) Bruno Fernandez
- (Colombia) Miguel Tobón
- (Argentina) Carlos María Zárate

The following players received entry from the qualifying draw:

- (Argentina) Thiago Cigarrán
- (Argentina) Tomás Farjat
- (Argentina) Segundo Goity Zapico
- (Peru) Arklon Huertas del Pino
- (Colombia) Samuel Alejandro Linde Palacios
- (Argentina) Ignacio Monzón

== Champions ==
=== Singles ===
- (Argentina) Juan Manuel La Serna def. (Uruguay) Franco Roncadelli 7–5, 2–6, 6–3.

=== Doubles ===
- (Peru) Arklon Huertas del Pino / (Peru) Conner Huertas del Pino def. (Argentina) Ignacio Monzón / (Chile) Nicolás Villalón 6–3, 6–4.
