= Ludwigshafen Challenger =

- 2019 Ludwigshafen Challenger

ATP Challenger Tour
- Event name: Ludwigshafen Challenger
- Location: Ludwigshafen, Germany
- Venue: BASF Tennisclub
- Category: ATP Challenger Tour
- Surface: Clay
- Draw: 56S / 4Q / 16D
- Prize money: €46,600

The Ludwigshafen Challenger is a professional tennis tournament played on clay courts. It is currently part of the ATP Challenger Tour. It is held annually in Ludwigshafen, Germany since 2019.

== Past finals ==
=== Singles ===
Year	Champion	Runner-up	Score
2019	(Germany) Yannick Hanfmann	(Slovakia) Filip Horanský	6–3, 6–1

=== Doubles ===
Year	Champions	Runner-ups	Score
2019	(United States) Nathaniel Lammons (Brazil) Fernando Romboli	(Portugal) João Domingues (Portugal) Pedro Sousa	7–6^{(7–4)}, 6–1
