= Fernando Romboli =

Brazilian tennis player

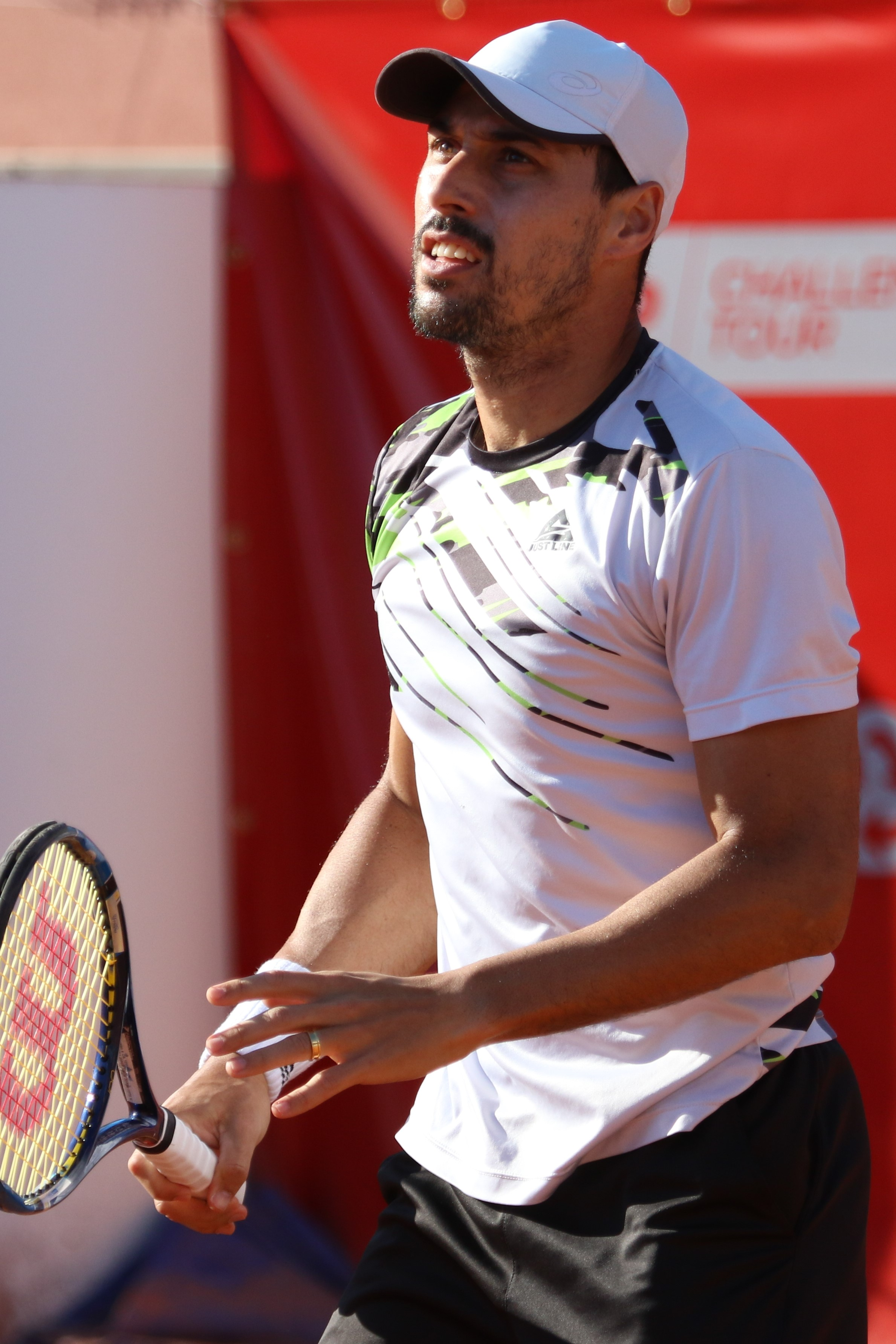
- Romboli at the 2022 BNP Paribas Primrose Bordeaux
- Country (sports): Brazil
- Residence: Guaruja, Brazil
- Born: 4 January 1989 (age 37) Santos, São Paulo, Brazil
- Height: 1.80 m (5 ft 11 in)
- Turned pro: 2006
- Plays: Right-handed (one-handed backhand)
- Coach: Tiago Leivas
- Prize money: US $ 774,047

Singles
- Career record: 0–1
- Career titles: 0
- Highest ranking: No. 236 (20 June 2011)

Grand Slam singles results
- French Open: Q1 (2011)
- Wimbledon: Q1 (2011)
- US Open: Q1 (2011)

Doubles
- Career record: 34–47
- Career titles: 2
- Highest ranking: No. 40 (8 September 2025)
- Current ranking: No. 40 (8 September 2025)

Grand Slam doubles results
- Australian Open: 1R (2025, 2026)
- French Open: 3R (2025)
- Wimbledon: 2R (2025, 2026)
- US Open: 3R (2025)
- Last updated on: 16 September 2025.

Fernando Romboli de Souza (born 4 January 1989) is a Brazilian professional tennis player who specializes in doubles. He has a career-high ATP doubles ranking of world No. 40, achieved on 8 September 2025. He also reached a singles ranking of No. 236 on 20 June 2011. Romboli has won two ATP Tour titles in doubles.

== Career ==
=== 2011 ===
In 2011 Romboli began his season at the Brazil Futures 1, losing in the second round to Ricardo Hocevar 4–6, 6–4, 1–6. He then participated in the São Paulo Challengers tournament, again losing in the round of 16, 6–3, 1–6, 1–6 to Thomas Fabbiano. Participating in the Seguros Bolívar Open Bucaramanga next, he had to enter the draw through the Qualifiers. Despite this setback, he easily beat his two qualifier opponents in straight sets to cement his spot in the main draw. He then produced the best tournament of his career, winning every match he played, dropping only three sets, and recording his first Challenger Circuit title. He then got a wildcard to enter his first ATP World Tour event, the Brasil Open, where he lost his first round to Rubén Ramírez Hidalgo in straight sets.

=== 2012: Ban for positive test ===
After testing positive to diuretics furosemide and hydrochlorothiazide, Romboli was banned for eight-and-a-half months.

=== 2021: First ATP doubles title ===
Romboli won his first ATP doubles title at the 2021 Croatia Open Umag partnering David Vega Hernández defeating top seeds Tomislav Brkić from Bosnia and Herzegovina and Nikola Ćaćić from Serbia.

=== 2025: Masters semifinal, ATP 500 final, top 50 ===
In March 2025, at the age of 36, he had the best campaign of his career at the 2025 BNP Paribas Open, where, entering as an alternate along with John-Patrick Smith, he defeated Austin Krajicek / Rajeev Ram (former world No. 1 and silver medalists in Paris 2024), sixth seeds Cash / Glasspool and the duo Bhambri / Göransson, reaching the semifinals of the tournament.

In April, he won his second ATP title in Houston with Smith.

In May, Romboli reached his biggest final at the ATP 500, the 2025 Hamburg Open with Andrés Molteni but lost to top seeds Simone Bolelli and Andrea Vavassori.

In June, he reached his first grass final at the 2025 Nottingham Open with Smith, defeating top seeds Argentine Guido Andreozzi and French Théo Arribagé. As a result, Romboli reached the top 50 on 30 June 2025 in the doubles rankings, before the 2025 Wimbledon Championships.

== Performance timeline ==
Key
W	F	SF	QF	#R	RR	Q#	DNQ	A	NH

(W) winner; (F) finalist; (SF) semifinalist; (QF) quarterfinalist; (#R) rounds 4, 3, 2, 1; (RR) round-robin stage; (Q#) qualification round; (DNQ) did not qualify; (A) absent; (NH) not held; (SR) strike rate (events won / competed); (W–L) win–loss record.
To avoid confusion and double counting, these charts are updated at the conclusion of a tournament or when the player's participation has ended.

=== Doubles ===
Tournament	2024	2025	2026	W–L	Win %	
Grand Slam tournaments
Australian Open	A	1R	1R	0 / 2	0–2	0%
French Open	1R	3R	1R	0 / 3	2–3	50%
Wimbledon	1R	2R	2R	0 / 3	2–3	33%
US Open	1R	3R	0 / 2	2–2	50%	
Win–loss	0–3	5–4	0 / 10	6–10	42%	
ATP Masters 1000
Indian Wells Masters	A	SF	0 / 1	3–1	75%	
Miami Open	A	A	0 / 0	0–0	–	
Monte Carlo Masters	A	A	0 / 0	0–0	–	
Madrid Open	A	1R	0 / 1	0–1	0%	
Italian Open	A	1R	0 / 1	0–1	0%	
Canadian Open	A	QF	0 / 1	2–1	67%	
Cincinnati Masters	A	1R	0 / 1	0–1	0%	
Shanghai Masters	A	1R	0 / 1	0–1	0%	
Paris Masters	A	1R	0 / 1	0–1	0%	
Win–loss	0–0	5–7	0 / 7	5–7	42%	

== ATP Tour finals ==
=== Doubles: 3 (2 titles, 1 runner-up) ===
Legend Grand Slam (0–0) ATP Masters 1000 (0–0) ATP 500 (0–1) ATP 250 (2–0)	Finals by surface Hard (0–0) Clay (2–1) Grass (0–0)	Finals by setting Outdoor (2–1) Indoor (0–0)

Result	W–L	Date	Tournament	Tier	Surface	Partner	Opponents	Score
Win	1–0	Jul 2021	Croatia Open, Croatia	ATP 250	Clay	(Spain) David Vega Hernández	(Bosnia and Herzegovina) Tomislav Brkić (Serbia) Nikola Ćaćić	6–3, 7–5
Win	2–0	Apr 2025	U.S. Men's Clay Court Championships, United States	ATP 250	Clay	(Australia) John-Patrick Smith	(Argentina) Federico Agustín Gómez (Mexico) Santiago González	6–1, 6–4
Loss	2–1	May 2025	Hamburg Open, Germany	ATP 500	Clay	(Argentina) Andrés Molteni	(Italy) Simone Bolelli (Italy) Andrea Vavassori	4–6, 0–6

== ATP Challenger and ITF Tour finals ==
=== Singles: 23 (14 titles, 9 runner-ups) ===
Legend ATP Challenger Tour (1–1) ITF Futures/WTT (13–8)	Finals by surface Hard (0–3) Clay (14–6)

Result	W–L	Date	Tournament	Tier	Surface	Opponent	Score
Win	1–0	May 2009	Brazil F4, Ribeirão Preto	Futures	Clay	(Brazil) Júlio Silva	6–4, 3–6, 6–4
Win	2–0	Jun 2009	Brazil F8, Divinópolis	Futures	Clay	(Brazil) Rodrigo Guidolin	6–7^{(3–7)}, 7–6^{(7–4)} ret.
Win	3–0	Sep 2009	Brazil F18, Fortaleza	Futures	Clay	(Brazil) Tiago Lopes	3–6, 6–3, 7–5
Loss	3–1	Jul 2010	Brazil F16, Jundiaí	Futures	Clay	(Brazil) Rogério Dutra Silva	3–6, 5–7
Win	4–1	Oct 2010	Brazil F26, Itu	Futures	Clay	(Sweden) Christian Lindell	6–4, 7–5
Loss	4–2	Oct 2010	Brazil F27, Salvador	Futures	Hard	(Brazil) Daniel Dutra da Silva	6–7^{(3–7)}, 6–3, 4–6
Win	5–2	Nov 2010	Brazil F33, Belo Horizonte	Futures	Clay	(Brazil) Thales Turini	6–3, 6–2
Win	6–2	Dec 2010	Brazil F37, Guarulhos	Futures	Clay	(Brazil) Leonardo Kirche	6–1, 6–0
Win	7–2	Dec 2010	Brazil F38, Sorocaba	Futures	Clay	(Brazil) Thales Turini	6–2, 6–1
Loss	7–3	Jan 2011	Bucaramanga, Colombia	Challenger	Clay	(France) Éric Prodon	3–6, 6–4, 1–6
Loss	7–4	Oct 2011	Brazil F34, Fernandópolis	Futures	Clay	(Brazil) Thiago Alves	2–6, 1–6
Win	8–4	Oct 2011	Brazil F35, Lins	Futures	Clay	(Brazil) André Miele	6–1, 6–2
Win	9–4	May 2012	Brazil F10, Manaus	Futures	Clay (i)	(Brazil) João Pedro Sorgi	6–3, 6–4
Win	10–4	Jun 2012	Brazil F13, Lins	Futures	Clay	(Brazil) Bruno Semenzato	6–2, 6–4
Loss	10–5	Jun 2013	USA F14, Innisbrook	Futures	Clay	(El Salvador) Marcelo Arévalo	3–6, 6–7^{(5–7)}
Loss	10–6	Aug 2013	Brazil F4, Manaus	Futures	Clay (i)	(Brazil) Pedro Sakamoto	6–7^{(4–7)}, 5–7
Win	11–6	Aug 2013	Brazil F5, Natal	Futures	Clay	(Brazil) José Pereira	7–6^{(7–4)}, 6–2
Loss	11–7	Sep 2013	Brazil F9, Belém	Futures	Hard	(Brazil) Bruno Sant'Anna	4–6, 5–7
Loss	11–8	Dec 2013	Brazil F19, Porto Alegre	Futures	Clay	(Argentina) Andrea Collarini	6–7^{(2–7)}, 1–6
Win	12–8	Dec 2014	Brazil F16, São José dos Campos	Futures	Clay	(Brazil) Tiago Lopes	4–6, 6–1, 6–2
Win	13–8	May 2015	Cali, Colombia	Challenger	Clay	(Ecuador) Giovanni Lapentti	4–6, 6–3, 6–2
Loss	13–9	Nov 2015	Brazil F8, Campos do Jordão	Futures	Hard	(Brazil) Caio Zampieri	6–1, 4–6, 5–7
Win	14–9	Jul 2016	Brazil F2, São José do Rio Preto	Futures	Clay	(Brazil) Oscar José Gutierrez	6–4, 6–3

=== Doubles: 100 (54–46) ===
Legend ATP Challenger Tour (22–25) ITF Futures/WTT (32–21)	Finals by surface Hard (9–13) Clay (44–31) Grass (1–2)

Result	W–L	Date	Tournament	Tier	Surface	Partner	Opponents	Score
Win	1–0	Sep 2007	Brazil F14, Sorocaba	Futures	Clay	(Brazil) Nicolas Santos	(Brazil) Raony Carvalho (Brazil) Rodrigo-Antonio Grilli	6–2, 0–6, [10–4]
Loss	1–1	Sep 2007	Brazil F15, Recife	Futures	Clay (i)	(Brazil) Nicolas Santos	(Spain) César Ferrer-Victoria (Spain) Adolfo Gómez-Pintér	2–6, 4–6
Loss	1–2	Dec 2007	Brazil F24, Santos	Futures	Clay	(Brazil) André Pinheiro	(Brazil) Ricardo Hocevar (Brazil) Alexandre Simoni	2–6, 4–6
Win	2–2	Apr 2008	Italy F9, Francavilla	Futures	Clay	(Brazil) André Pinheiro	(Serbia) David Savić (Croatia) Vilim Višak	6–4, 6–2
Loss	2–3	Jul 2008	Brazil F12, Brasília	Futures	Clay	(Brazil) Tiago Lopes	(Brazil) Marcelo Demoliner (Brazil) André Miele	5–7, 4–6
Win	3–3	Sep 2008	Brazil F20, Recife	Futures	Clay (i)	(Brazil) André Pinheiro	(France) Marc Auradou (Brazil) Rodrigo-Antonio Grilli	6–3, 3–6, [11–9]
Loss	3–4	Sep 2008	Brazil F21, Aracaju	Futures	Clay (i)	(Brazil) André Pinheiro	(France) Marc Auradou (Brazil) Rodrigo-Antonio Grilli	4–6, 4–6
Loss	3–5	Oct 2008	Brazil F22, Itu	Futures	Hard	(Brazil) Nicolas Santos	(Brazil) Diego Matos (Argentina) Joaquín-Jesús Monteferrario	6–4, 3–6, [8–10]
Win	4–5	Oct 2008	Brazil F23, Uberaba	Futures	Clay	(Brazil) André Pinheiro	(Brazil) Carlos Oliveira (Brazil) Edesio Semencato	6–4, 7–5
Win	5–5	Oct 2008	Brazil F24, São Leopoldo	Futures	Clay	(Brazil) Renato Silveira	(Brazil) Eric Gomes (Brazil) Caio Zampieri	6–3, 6–4
Win	6–5	May 2009	Brazil F1, Campinas	Futures	Clay	(Brazil) André Miele	(Brazil) Marcelo Demoliner (Brazil) Rodrigo Guidolin	7–6^{(7–5)}, 5–7, [10–8]
Win	7–5	May 2009	Brazil F2, Caldas Novas	Futures	Hard	(Brazil) Nicolas Santos	(Brazil) Leonardo Kirche (Argentina) Juan-Manuel Valverde	6–7^{(5–7)}, 6–4, [10–7]
Win	8–5	May 2009	Brazil F3, Uberlândia	Futures	Clay	(Brazil) Júlio Silva	(Brazil) Marcelo Demoliner (Brazil) Rodrigo Guidolin	6–1, 6–4
Win	9–5	May 2009	Brazil F4, Ribeirão Preto	Futures	Clay	(Brazil) Júlio Silva	(Brazil) Pedro Feitosa (Brazil) André Pinheiro	6–3, 6–3
Win	10–5	Jun 2009	Brazil F6, Araguari	Futures	Clay	(Brazil) Eric Gomes	(Brazil) Carlos Oliveira (Brazil) Edesio Semencato	6–4, 6–4
Win	11–5	Jun 2009	Brazil F7, Brasília	Futures	Clay	(Brazil) Alexandre Bonatto	(Peru) Álvaro Raposo de Oliveira (Bolivia) Marco Antonio Rojas	6–3, 6–1
Win	12–5	Aug 2009	Brazil F16, São José do Rio Preto	Futures	Clay	(Brazil) André Miele	(France) Marc Auradou (Brazil) Rodrigo-Antonio Grilli	7–6^{(7–3)}, 6–1
Win	13–5	Sep 2009	Brazil F19, Recife	Futures	Clay	(Brazil) André Miele	(Brazil) Alexandre Bonatto (Brazil) Leonardo Kirche	6–3, 6–0
Win	14–5	Sep 2009	Brazil F20, Cuiabá	Futures	Clay	(Brazil) Alexandre Bonatto	(Brazil) Rodrigo-Antonio Grilli (Brazil) Tiago Lopes	6–4, 6–4
Loss	14–6	May 2010	Brazil F4, Fortaleza	Futures	Clay	(Brazil) Franco Ferreiro	(Mexico) Luis Díaz Barriga (Mexico) Miguel Ángel Reyes-Varela	7–6^{(7–5)}, 6–7^{(2–7)}, [6–10]
Loss	14–7	Jul 2010	Brazil F13, Araçatuba	Futures	Clay	(Brazil) Carlos Oliveira	(Brazil) Rogério Dutra Silva (Brazil) Caio Zampieri	6–7^{(7–9)}, 4–6
Loss	14–8	Jul 2010	Brazil F12, Sorocaba	Futures	Clay	(Brazil) Rodrigo-Antonio Grilli	(Brazil) Alexandre Bonatto (Brazil) Rodrigo Guidolin	6–1, 2–6, [9–11]
Win	15–8	Sep 2010	Brazil F23, Fortaleza	Futures	Clay	(Uruguay) Marcel Felder	(Brazil) Diego Matos (Brazil) André Miele	7–6^{(7–4)}, 4–6, [10–4]
Win	16–8	Oct 2010	Brazil F26, Itu	Futures	Clay	(Brazil) Rodrigo-Antonio Grilli	(Brazil) Diego Matos (Brazil) Daniel Dutra da Silva	6–2, 6–3
Loss	16–9	Oct 2010	Brazil F27, Salvador	Futures	Hard	(Brazil) Fabrício Neis	(Greece) Theodoros Angelinos (Brazil) Diego Matos	3–6, 6–7^{(5–7)}
Win	17–9	Oct 2010	Brazil F29, São Leopoldo	Futures	Clay	(Brazil) Nicolas Santos	(Brazil) Fabrício Neis (Brazil) José Pereira	6–4, 6–2
Loss	17–10	Oct 2010	Brazil F30, Porto Alegre	Futures	Clay	(Brazil) Nicolas Santos	(Italy) Giorgio Portaluri (Argentina) Juan-Pablo Villar	3–6, 5–7
Loss	17–11	Nov 2010	Brazil F32, Barueri	Futures	Hard	(Brazil) Rodrigo-Antonio Grilli	(Brazil) Victor Maynard (Brazil) Nicolas Santos	3–6, 3–6
Win	18–11	Dec 2010	Brazil F36, Araçatuba	Futures	Clay	(Brazil) Marcelo Demoliner	(Brazil) Fabiano de Paula (Brazil) Daniel Dutra da Silva	6–3, 7–6^{(7–3)}
Win	19–11	Apr 2011	Recife, Brazil	Challenger	Hard	(Ecuador) Giovanni Lapentti	(Brazil) André Ghem (Brazil) Rodrigo Guidolin	6–2, 6–1
Loss	19–12	Jun 2011	Netherlands F1, Almere	Futures	Clay	(Argentina) Pablo Galdón	(Netherlands) Antal van der Duim (Netherlands) Tim van Terheijden	4–6, 3–6
Loss	19–13	Oct 2011	Portugal F5, Porto	Futures	Clay	(Germany) Richard Becker	(Russia) Richard Muzaev (Russia) Alexander Rumyantsev	6–2, 6–7^{(3–7)}, [8–10]
Win	20–13	Oct 2011	Brazil F33, São Paulo	Futures	Clay	(Brazil) Marcelo Demoliner	(Brazil) Daniel Dutra da Silva (Brazil) Caio Zampieri	6–1, 4–6, [10–4]
Win	21–13	Oct 2011	Brazil F35, Lins	Futures	Clay	(Brazil) Victor Maynard	(Ecuador) Diego Hidalgo (Brazil) Ricardo Siggia	2–6, 6–2, [10–0]
Win	22–13	Dec 2011	Brazil F44, Brasília	Futures	Clay	(Ecuador) Diego Hidalgo	(Argentina) Maximiliano Estévez (Argentina) Agustín Picco	6–2, 6–4
Win	23–13	Jan 2012	São Paulo, Brazil	Challenger	Hard	(Brazil) Júlio Silva	(Slovakia) Jozef Kovalík (Brazil) José Pereira	7–5, 6–2
Loss	23–14	Feb 2012	Brazil F8, Itajaí	Futures	Clay	(France) Jonathan Eysseric	(Portugal) Leonardo Tavares (Montenegro) Goran Tošić	6–1, 3–6, [8–10]
Loss	23–15	Jun 2012	Peru F2, Lima	Futures	Clay	(Brazil) Victor Maynard	(Brazil) Marcelo Demoliner (Argentina) Renzo Olivo	6–2, 5–7, [5–10]
Win	24–15	Jun 2013	USA F17, Rochester	Futures	Clay	(United States) Chase Buchanan	(United States) Marcos Giron (United States) Dennis Novikov	6–2, 6–3
Win	25–15	Aug 2013	São Paulo, Brazil	Challenger	Clay	(Argentina) Eduardo Schwank	(El Salvador) Marcelo Arévalo (Colombia) Nicolás Barrientos	6–7^{(6–8)}, 6–4, [10–8]
Loss	25–16	Sep 2013	Brazil F9, Belém	Futures	Hard	(Brazil) Rafael Camilo	(Brazil) José Pereira (Brazil) Alexandre Tsuchiya	6–7^{(5–7)}, 6–7^{(9–11)}
Win	26–16	Oct 2013	Brazil F13, Belém	Futures	Hard	(Argentina) Pablo Albano	(Brazil) Wilson Leite (Brazil) Victor Maynard	4–6, 6–1, [10–8]
Win	27–16	Nov 2013	Lima, Peru	Challenger	Clay	(Argentina) Andrés Molteni	(Brazil) Marcelo Demoliner (Peru) Sergio Galdós	6–4, 6–4
Win	28–16	Mar 2014	Salinas, Ecuador	Challenger	Clay	(Venezuela) Roberto Maytín	(Bolivia) Hugo Dellien (Argentina) Eduardo Schwank	6–3, 6–4
Win	29–16	Oct 2014	Brazil F10, Belém	Futures	Hard	(Brazil) Caio Zampieri	(Brazil) Daniel Dutra da Silva (Brazil) Pedro Sakamoto	6–3, 6–1
Win	30–16	Nov 2014	Brazil F11, Porto Alegre	Futures	Clay	(Brazil) Caio Zampieri	(Brazil) Wilson Leite (Brazil) Fabrício Neis	4–6, 6–3, [10–3]
Win	31–16	Nov 2014	Brazil F12, São Paulo	Futures	Clay	(Brazil) Orlando Luz	(Brazil) Daniel Dutra da Silva (Brazil) Pedro Sakamoto	6–7^{(3–7)}, 6–2, [11–9]
Win	32–16	Nov 2014	Brazil F15, Foz do Iguaçu	Futures	Clay	(Brazil) Fabrício Neis	(Argentina) Matías Rodolfo Buchhass (Argentina) Tomás Iriarte	7–6^{(7–3)}, 6–3
Loss	32–17	Feb 2015	Chile F1, Viña del Mar	Futures	Clay	(Brazil) Caio Silva	(Brazil) Ricardo Hocevar (Brazil) Tiago Lopes	2–6, 3–6
Loss	32–18	May 2015	Colombia F2, Pereira	Futures	Clay	(Brazil) Caio Zampieri	(Brazil) Wilson Leite (Brazil) João Pedro Sorgi	6–1, 1–6, [8–10]
Loss	32–19	Jun 2015	Brazil F1, Itajaí	Futures	Clay	(Brazil) Caio Zampieri	(Brazil) Daniel Dutra da Silva (Brazil) Bruno Sant'Anna	4–6, 6–3, [7–10]
Win	33–19	Oct 2015	Pereira, Colombia	Challenger	Clay	(Argentina) Andrés Molteni	(El Salvador) Marcelo Arévalo (Colombia) Juan Sebastián Gómez	6–4, 7–6^{(14–12)}
Loss	33–20	Oct 2015	Monterrey, Mexico	Challenger	Hard	(Italy) Paolo Lorenzi	(Netherlands) Thiemo de Bakker (Netherlands) Mark Vervoort	w/o
Win	34–20	Feb 2016	USA F8, Plantation	Futures	Clay	(Brazil) Caio Zampieri	(United States) Evan Zhu (United States) Michael Zhu	w/o
Win	35–20	Jul 2016	France F15, Troyes	Futures	Clay	(France) Jonathan Eysseric	(Ukraine) Vadim Alekseenko (France) Maxime Mora	6–4, 6–1
Loss	35–21	Oct 2016	Buenos Aires, Argentina	Challenger	Clay	(Peru) Sergio Galdós	(Chile) Julio Peralta (Argentina) Horacio Zeballos	6–7^{(5–7)}, 6–7^{(1–7)}
Win	36–21	Dec 2016	Dominican Republic F2, Santo Domingo	Futures	Clay	(Argentina) Juan Ignacio Galarza	(United States) Hunter Callahan (United States) Nicholas S. Hu	7–6^{(7–4)}, 6–4
Win	37–21	May 2017	Nigeria F1, Abuja	Futures	Hard	(Brazil) Fabiano de Paula	(Italy) Alessandro Bega (Norway) Viktor Durasovic	6–4, 6–7^{(5–7)}, [10–7]
Win	38–21	May 2017	Nigeria F3, Abuja	Futures	Hard	(Brazil) Fabiano de Paula	(Tunisia) Moez Echargui (Zimbabwe) Mark Fynn	3–6, 6–3, [16–14]
Loss	38–22	Jun 2017	Italy F17, Bergamo	Futures	Clay	(Argentina) Franco Agamenone	(Italy) Walter Trusendi (Italy) Andrea Vavassori	1–6, 6–3, [11–13]
Loss	38–23	Sep 2017	Egypt F24, Cairo	Futures	Clay	(Italy) Fabrizio Ornago	(France) Fabien Reboul (France) Johan Sébastien Tatlot	4–6, 4–6
Win	39–23	Nov 2017	Montevideo, Uruguay	Challenger	Clay	(Monaco) Romain Arneodo	(Uruguay) Ariel Behar (Brazil) Fabiano de Paula	2–6, 6–4, [10–8]
Win	40–23	Feb 2018	Morelos, Mexico	Challenger	Hard	(Venezuela) Roberto Maytín	(United States) Evan King (United States) Nathan Pasha	7–5, 6–3
Loss	40–24	May 2018	Puerto Vallarta, Mexico	Challenger	Hard	(Zimbabwe) Benjamin Lock	(Croatia) Ante Pavić (Serbia) Danilo Petrović	7–6^{(7–2)}, 4–6, [5–10]
Loss	40–25	Jul 2018	Milan, Italy	Challenger	Clay	(Ecuador) Gonzalo Escobar	(Italy) Julian Ocleppo (Italy) Andrea Vavassori	6–4, 1–6, [9–11]
Loss	40–26	Jul 2018	Recanati, Italy	Challenger	Hard	(Ecuador) Gonzalo Escobar	(China) Gong Maoxin (China) Zhang Ze	6–2, 6–7^{(5–7)}, [8–10]
Loss	40–27	Jul 2018	Prague, Czech Republic	Challenger	Clay	(Spain) David Vega Hernández	(Belgium) Sander Gillé (Belgium) Joran Vliegen	4–6, 2–6
Loss	40–28	Oct 2018	Campinas, Brazil	Challenger	Clay	(Argentina) Franco Agamenone	(Bolivia) Hugo Dellien (Argentina) Guillermo Durán	5–7, 4–6
Win	41–28	Mar 2019	Santiago, Chile	Challenger	Clay	(Argentina) Franco Agamenone	(Argentina) Facundo Argüello (Uruguay) Martín Cuevas	7–6^{(7–5)}, 1–6, [10–6]
Win	42–28	Apr 2019	Tallahassee, USA	Challenger	Clay	(Venezuela) Roberto Maytín	(United States) Thai-Son Kwiatkowski (United States) Noah Rubin	6–2, 4–6, [10–7]
Win	43–28	May 2019	Savannah, USA	Challenger	Clay	(Venezuela) Roberto Maytín	(France) Manuel Guinard (France) Arthur Rinderknech	6–7^{(5–7)}, 6–4, [11–9]
Loss	43–29	Jun 2019	Vicenza, Italy	Challenger	Clay	(Brazil) Fabrício Neis	(Portugal) Gonçalo Oliveira (Belarus) Andrei Vasilevski	3–6, 4–6
Win	44–29	Jul 2019	Ludwigshafen, Germany	Challenger	Clay	(United States) Nathaniel Lammons	(Portugal) Pedro Sousa (Portugal) João Domingues	7–6^{(7–4)}, 6–1
Win	45–29	Aug 2019	Manerbio, Italy	Challenger	Clay	(Brazil) Fabricio Neis	(France) Sadio Doumbia (France) Fabien Reboul	6–4, 7–6^{(7–4)}
Loss	45–30	Oct 2019	Campinas, Brazil	Challenger	Clay	(Mexico) Miguel Ángel Reyes-Varela	(Brazil) Orlando Luz (Brazil) Rafael Matos	7–6^{(7–2)}, 4–6, [8–10]
Loss	45–31	Oct 2020	Marbella, Spain	Challenger	Clay	(Venezuela) Luis David Martinez	(Spain) Gerard Granollers (Spain) Pedro Martínez	3–6, 4–6
Loss	45–32	Nov 2020	Marbella, Spain	Challenger	Clay	(Brazil) Rogerio Dutra Silva	(Venezuela) Luis David Martinez (Brazil) Felipe Meligeni Alves	3–6, 3–6
Win	46–32	Apr 2021	Salinas, Ecuador	Challenger	Hard	(Mexico) Miguel Ángel Reyes-Varela	(Ecuador) Diego Hidalgo (Tunisia) Skander Mansouri	7–5, 4–6, [10–2]
Loss	46–33	Aug 2021	Mallorca, Spain	Challenger	Hard	(Poland) Jan Zieliński	(Poland) Karol Drzewiecki (Spain) Sergio Martos Gornés	4–6, 6–4, [3–10]
Loss	46–34	Oct 2021	Lima, Peru	Challenger	Clay	(Colombia) Nicolás Barrientos	(Germany) Julian Lenz (Austria) Gerald Melzer	6–7^{(4–7)}, 6–7^{(3–7)}
Loss	46–35	Dec 2021	Rio de Janeiro, Brazil	Challenger	Hard	(United States) James Cerretani	(Brazil) Orlando Luz (Brazil) Rafael Matos	3–6, 6–7^{(2–7)}
Win	47–35	June 2022	Parma, Italy	Challenger	Clay	(Italy) Luciano Darderi	(Ukraine) Denys Molchanov (Slovakia) Igor Zelenay	6–2, 6–3
Win	48–35	June 2022	Milan, Italy	Challenger	Clay	(Italy) Luciano Darderi	(Ecuador) Diego Hidalgo (Colombia) Cristian Rodríguez	6–4, 2–6, [10–5]
Loss	48–36	Sep 2022	Istanbul, Turkey	Challenger	Hard	(India) Arjun Kadhe	(India) Purav Raja (India) Divij Sharan	4–6, 6–3, [8–10]
Loss	48–37	Feb 2023	Manama, Bahrain	Challenger	Hard	(Philippines) Ruben Gonzales	(Finland) Patrik Niklas-Salminen (Netherlands) Bart Stevens	3–6, 4–6
Loss	48–38	Jun 2023	Vicenza, Italy	Challenger	Clay	(Brazil) Marcelo Zormann	(India) Anirudh Chandrasekar (India) Vijay Sundar Prashanth	3–6, 2–6
Win	49–38	Jul 2023	San Benedetto del Tronto, Italy	Challenger	Clay	(Brazil) Marcelo Zormann	(Ecuador) Diego Hidalgo (Colombia) Cristian Rodriguez	6–3, 6–4
Loss	49–39	Aug 2023	Meerbusch, Germany	Challenger	Clay	(Brazil) Marcelo Zormann	(France) Manuel Guinard (France) Grégoire Jacq	5–7, 6–7^{(3–7)}
Win	50–39	Aug 2023	Todi, Italy	Challenger	Clay	(Brazil) Marcelo Zormann	(Argentina) Román Andrés Burruchaga (Brazil) Orlando Luz	6–7^{(13–15)}, 6–4, [10–5]
Win	51–39	Mar 2024	Santiago, Chile	Challenger	Clay	(Brazil) Marcelo Zormann	(Bolivia) Federico Zeballos (Bolivia) Boris Arias	7–6^{(7–5)}, 6–4
Win	52–39	Oct 2024	Curitiba, Brazil	Challenger	Clay	(Chile) Matías Soto	(Poland) Karol Drzewiecki (Poland) Piotr Matuszewski	7–6 ^{(7–5)}, 7–6 ^{(7–4)}
Loss	52–40	Jan 2025	Piracicaba, Brazil	Challenger	Clay	(Brazil) Marcelo Demoliner	(Argentina) Guido Andreozzi (Brazil) Orlando Luz	7–6^{(7–4)}, 2–6, [9–11]
Win	53–40	Feb 2025	Rosario, Argentina	Challenger	Clay	(Brazil) Marcelo Demoliner	(Argentina) Guido Andreozzi (France) Théo Arribagé	7–5, 6–3
Loss	53–41	Mar 2025	Córdoba, Argentina	Challenger	Clay	(Chile) Matías Soto	(Poland) Karol Drzewiecki (Poland) Piotr Matuszewski	4–6, 4–6
Loss	53–42	Jun 2025	Nottingham, United Kingdom	Challenger	Grass	(Australia) John-Patrick Smith	(Mexico) Santiago González (United States) Austin Krajicek	6–7^{(2–7)}, 4–6
Loss	53–43	Feb 2026	Rosario, Argentina	Challenger	Clay	(Mexico) Miguel Ángel Reyes-Varela	(Uruguay) Ignacio Carou (Argentina) Facundo Mena	1–6, 4–6
Win	54–43	Jun 2026	Nottingham, United Kingdom	Challenger	Grass	(United States) Theodore Winegar	(United States) Mac Kiger (United States) Reese Stalder	6–3, 6–4
Loss	54–44	Jul 2026	Newport, United States	Challenger	Grass	(Australia) John-Patrick Smith	(New Zealand) Finn Reynolds (New Zealand) James Watt	1–6, 7–6^{(7–2)}, [6–10]
Loss	54-45	Oct 2026	Villena, Spain	Challenger	Hard	(Israel) Daniel Cukierman	(United States) Benjamin Kittay (Japan) Takeru Yuzuki	4–6, 7–5, [7–10]
Loss	54–46	Oct 2026	Olbia, Italy	Challenger	Hard	(Israel) Daniel Cukierman	(Netherlands) Jarno Jans (Belgium) Joran Vliegen	3–6, 4–6
