= Rosario Challenger =

- 2025 Rosario Challenger

ATP Challenger Tour
- Location: Rosario, Argentina
- Category: ATP Challenger Tour 125
- Surface: Clay
- Prize money: $225,000
- Website: Website

The YPF Rosario Challenger is a professional tennis tournament played on clay courts. It is currently part of the ATP Challenger Tour 125. It was first held in Rosario, Argentina in 2025 and was guaranteed to run for at least three years.

== Past finals ==
=== Singles ===
| Year | Champion | Runner-up | Score |
|---|---|---|---|
| 2026 | (Argentina) Camilo Ugo Carabelli | (Argentina) Román Andrés Burruchaga | 6–2, 6–3 |
| 2025 | (Argentina) Camilo Ugo Carabelli | (Bolivia) Hugo Dellien | 3–6, 6–3, 6–2 |

=== Doubles ===
| Year | Champions | Runners-up | Score |
|---|---|---|---|
| 2026 | (Uruguay) Ignacio Carou (Argentina) Facundo Mena | (Mexico) Miguel Ángel Reyes-Varela (Brazil) Fernando Romboli | 6–1, 6–4 |
| 2025 | (Brazil) Marcelo Demoliner (Brazil) Fernando Romboli | (Argentina) Guido Andreozzi (France) Théo Arribagé | 7–5, 6–3 |
