= Challenger Córdoba =

Tennis tournament in Argentina

- 2025 Challenger Córdoba

ATP Challenger Tour
- Event name: AAT Challenger Santander Córdoba
- Location: Córdoba, Argentina
- Venue: Córdoba Lawn Tenis Club
- Category: ATP Challenger Tour
- Surface: Clay
- Prize money: $100,000
- Website: Website

The AAT Challenger Santander Córdoba is a professional tennis tournament played on clay courts. It is currently part of the ATP Challenger Tour. It was first held in Córdoba, Argentina, in 2025 when it replaced the ATP 250 Córdoba Open event.

== Past finals ==
=== Singles ===
Year	Champion	Runner-up	Score
2025	(Argentina) Thiago Agustín Tirante	(Argentina) Juan Pablo Ficovich	6–4, 6–0
2026	(Argentina) Juan Manuel La Serna	(Uruguay) Franco Roncadelli	7–5, 2–6, 6–3

=== Doubles ===
Year	Champions	Runners-up	Score
2025	(Poland) Karol Drzewiecki (Poland) Piotr Matuszewski	(Brazil) Fernando Romboli (Chile) Matías Soto	6–4, 6–4
2026	(Peru) Arklon Huertas del Pino (Peru) Conner Huertas del Pino	(Argentina) Ignacio Monzón (Chile) Nicolás Villalón	6–3, 6–4
